= 2026 FC Supra du Québec season =

Canadian soccer club's season of play

FC Supra du Québec
2026 season
- President: Rocco Placentino
- Head coach: Nicholas Razzaghi (until September 28); Kyt Selaidopoulos (from September 28)
- Stadium: Stade Boréale
- Canadian Premier League: 4th
- CPL playoffs: Semi-finals
- Canadian Championship: Semi-finals
- Top goalscorer: League: Loïc Kwemi (15); All: Loïc Kwemi (16)
| Home colours | Away colours |

The 2026 FC Supra du Québec season was the first season in the history of FC Supra. In addition to the Canadian Premier League, the club also competed in the Canadian Championship.

For their inaugural season, FC Supra appointed Nicholas Razzaghi as the club's first head coach, on October 30, 2025.

== Squad ==
As of September 18, 2026

| No. | Player | Nationality | Position(s) | Date of birth (age) | Previous club | Notes |
Goalkeepers
| 16 | Jolan Faury | (Canada) | GK | January 1, 2010 (age 16) | (Canada) CS Saint-Laurent | DEV, U21 |
| 32 | Joakim Milli | (Canada) | GK | April 27, 2000 (age 26) | (Canada) CS Saint-Laurent | |
| 80 | Makhoudia Diop | (Senegal) | GK | March 15, 1997 (age 29) | (Canada) CS Longueuil | |
Defenders
| 3 | Thomas Lebeuf | (Canada) | DF | February 11, 2006 (age 20) | (United States) UNLV Rebels | U21 |
| 4 | Matisse Chrétien | (Canada) | CB | September 18, 2003 (age 23) | (United States) RKC Third Coast | |
| 5 | Keesean Ferdinand | (Canada) | RB / CB | August 17, 2003 (age 23) | (United States) Columbus Crew 2 | |
| 11 | Diyaeddine Abzi | (Canada) | LB | November 23, 1998 (age 27) | (France) Pau FC | |
| 15 | Zachary Brault-Guillard | (Canada) | RB | December 30, 1998 (age 27) | (Switzerland) Lugano | |
| 23 | Zachary Fernandez | (Canada) | RB | September 24, 2001 (age 25) | (Canada) Valour FC | |
| 29 | Ismaël Yeo | (Ivory Coast) (Canada) | DF | January 31, 2005 (age 21) | (Canada) CF Montréal U23 | IL |
| 37 | Sasha Deslandes | (Canada) | CB | June 11, 2006 (age 20) | (Canada) CS Saint-Laurent | U21 |
| 49 | Eliakim Awonongbadje | (Togo) | CB | November 7, 2008 (age 18) | (Canada) CS Saint-Laurent | DEV, U21 |
| | Isaiah Byer | (Canada) | CB | August 2, 2009 (age 17) | (Canada) CS Saint-Laurent | DEV, U21 |
Midfielders
| 2 | Charles Auguste | (Haiti) (Canada) | CM / DM | November 25, 1999 (age 26) | (Canada) CS Saint-Laurent | |
| 6 | Alessandro Biello | (Canada) | CM | July 20, 2005 (age 21) | (Canada) CF Montréal | U21 |
| 8 | Omar Elkalkouli | (Canada) | AM | May 19, 2004 (age 22) | (Canada) CS Mont-Royal Outremont | |
| 12 | Clément Bayiha | (Canada) | RW / RB | March 8, 1999 (age 27) | (Iceland) Þór Akureyri | |
| 20 | Oussama Boughanmi | (Tunisia) | CM / DM / RB | January 5, 1990 (age 36) | (Canada) Lakeshore SC | |
| 21 | Olivier Correa | (Canada) | AM | March 19, 2002 (age 24) | (Canada) CS Saint-Laurent | |
| 24 | Safwane Mlah | (Canada) | AM | December 8, 2001 (age 24) | (Canada) Valour FC | |
| 33 | Aboubacar Sissoko | (Mali) | CM | October 9, 1995 (age 31) | (Canada) Atlético Ottawa | |
| 64 | Wesley Wandje | (Cameroon) | RM | May 7, 2000 (age 26) | (Canada) Valour FC | |
Forwards
| 7 | David Choinière | (Canada) | LW / RW / AM | February 7, 1997 (age 29) | (Canada) Forge FC | |
| 9 | Loïc Kwemi | (Canada) (Cameroon) | CF | March 2, 1997 (age 29) | (Canada) CS LaSalle | |
| 10 | Sean Rea | (Canada) | CF / CM | May 15, 2002 (age 24) | (Canada) HFX Wanderers FC | |
| 13 | Alexander Makarova | (Canada) | LW / ST | August 11, 2009 (age 17) | (Canada) Lakeshore SC | DEV, U21 |
| 19 | Jack McInerney | (United States) | CF | August 5, 1992 (age 34) | (Canada) CS Saint-Laurent | INT |
| 77 | Riad Bey | (Algeria) (Canada) | RW / ST | August 9, 2001 (age 25) | (Canada) CS Saint-Laurent | |
| 92 | Noah dos Santos | (Canada) (Portugal) | LW / CF | February 12, 2002 (age 24) | (Portugal) Leça | |
| 99 | Ibrahim Conde | (Canada) | CF | July 10, 2001 (age 25) | (Canada) FC Laval | |

== Transfers ==
=== In ===
==== Transferred in ====
| No. | Pos. | Player | From club | Fee/notes | Date | Source |
|---|---|---|---|---|---|---|
| | FW | (Canada) David Choinière | (Canada) Forge FC | Free | December 10, 2025 | |
| | FW | (Canada) Sean Rea | (Canada) Halifax Wanderers | Free | December 10, 2025 | |
| | FW | (Canada) Loïc Kwemi | (Canada) CS LaSalle | Free | December 10, 2025 | |
| | GK | (Canada) Joakim Milli | (Canada) CS Saint-Laurent | Free | December 19, 2025 | |
| | MF | (Haiti) Charles Auguste | (Canada) CS Saint-Laurent | Free | December 19, 2025 | |
| | MF | (Tunisia) Oussama Boughanmi | (Canada) Lakeshore SC | Free | December 19, 2025 | |
| | MF | (Mali) Aboubacar Sissoko | (Canada) Atlético Ottawa | Free | January 8, 2026 | |
| | MF | (Cameroon) Wesley Wandje | (Canada) Valour FC | Free | January 8, 2026 | |
| | DF | (Canada) Matisse Chrétien | (United States) RKC Third Coast | Free | January 15, 2026 | |
| | DF | (Canada) Thomas Lebeuf | (United States) UNLV Rebels | Free | January 15, 2026 | |
| | DF | (Ivory Coast) Ismaël Yeo | (Canada) CF Montréal U23 | Free | January 15, 2026 | |
| | MF | (Canada) Omar Elkalkouli | (Canada) CS Mont-Royal Outremont | Free | January 15, 2026 | |
| | DF | (Canada) Keesean Ferdinand | (United States) Columbus Crew 2 | Free | January 19, 2026 | |
| | MF | (Canada) Clément Bayiha | (Iceland) Þór Akureyri | Free | January 19, 2026 | |
| | MF | (France) Bakary Kaboré | (Canada) CS Saint-Laurent | Free | January 19, 2026 | |
| | MF | (Canada) Alessandro Biello | (Canada) CF Montréal | Free | January 21, 2026 | |
| | DF | (Canada) Diyaeddine Abzi | Free Agent | Free | February 13, 2026 | |
| | MF | (Canada) Safwane Mlah | (Canada) Valour FC | Free | March 17, 2026 | |
| | MF | (Canada) Olivier Correa | (Canada) CS Saint-Laurent | Free | March 17, 2026 | |
| | MF | (Moldova) Călin Calaidjoglu | (Canada) FC Laval | Selected 1st in the 2026 CPL–U Sports Draft, U Sports contract | March 25, 2026 | |
| | FW | (Canada) Alexandre Marcoux | (Canada) CS Saint-Laurent | Selected 2nd in the 2026 CPL–U Sports Draft, U Sports contract | March 25, 2026 | |
| | DF | (Togo) Eliakim Awonongbadje | (Canada) CS Saint-Laurent | Signed to a development contract | March 25, 2026 | |
| | DF | (Canada) Isaiah Byer | (Canada) CS Saint-Laurent | Signed to a development contract | March 25, 2026 | |
| | GK | (Canada) Jolan Faury | (Canada) CS Saint-Laurent | Signed to a development contract | March 25, 2026 | |
| | FW | (Canada) Alexander Makarova George | (Canada) Lakeshore SC | Signed to a development contract | March 25, 2026 | |
| | GK | (Senegal) Makhoudia Diop | (Canada) CS Longueuil | Free | March 31, 2026 | |
| | FW | (Algeria) Riad Bey | (Canada) CS Saint-Laurent | Free | March 31, 2026 | |
| | FW | (Canada) Ibrahim Conde | (Canada) FC Laval | Free | March 31, 2026 | |
| | DF | (Canada) Sasha Deslandes | (Canada) CS Saint-Laurent | Free | May 13, 2026 | |
| | DF | (Canada) Zachary Fernandez | Free Agent | Free | June 6, 2026 | |
| | FW | (Canada) Noah dos Santos | (Portugal) Leça | Undisclosed fee | August 21, 2026 | |
| | DF | (Canada) Zachary Brault-Guillard | (Switzerland) FC Lugano | Free | September 4, 2026 | |
| | FW | (United States) Jack McInerney | (Canada) CS Saint-Laurent | Free | September 18, 2026 | |

==== Draft picks ====
FC Supra selected the following players in the 2026 CPL–U Sports Draft. Draft picks are not automatically signed to the team roster. Only those who are signed to a contract will be listed as transfers in.

| Round | Selection | Pos. | Player | Nationality | University |
|---|---|---|---|---|---|
| 1 | 1 | MF | Călin Calaidjoglu | Moldova | Montréal |
| 1 | 2 | FW | Alexandre Marcoux | Canada | UQTR |

=== Out ===
| No. | Pos. | Player | To club | Fee/notes | Date | Source |
|---|---|---|---|---|---|---|
| 19 | MF | (France) Bakary Kaboré | | Contract terminated by mutual consent | August 6, 2026 | |

== Competitions ==
=== Overall record ===
| Competition | First match | Last match | Starting round | Final position | Record | | | | | | | |
| Competition | First match | Last match | Starting round | Final position | Pld | W | D | L | GF | GA | GD | Win % |
|---|---|---|---|---|---|---|---|---|---|---|---|---|
| Canadian Premier League | April 11 | October 25 | Matchday 1 | 4th | 28 | 11 | 5 | 12 | 47 | 50 | −3 | 39.29 |
| Canadian Premier League playoffs | November 1 | November 7 | Semi-finals | Semi-finals | 2 | 1 | 0 | 1 | 2 | 3 | −1 | 50.00 |
| Canadian Championship | May 8 | September 15 | Preliminary round | Semi-finals | 5 | 2 | 2 | 1 | 10 | 7 | +3 | 40.00 |
| Total | | | | | 35 | 14 | 7 | 14 | 59 | 60 | −1 | 40.00 |

Source: Flashscore

=== Canadian Premier League ===
==== League table ====
| Pos | Team | Pld | W | D | L | GF | GA | GD | Pts | Qualification |
|---|---|---|---|---|---|---|---|---|---|---|
| 1 | Cavalry FC (S) | 28 | 18 | 6 | 4 | 58 | 23 | +35 | 60 | Playoffs and 2027 CONCACAF Champions Cup |
| 2 | Forge FC (V) | 28 | 17 | 7 | 4 | 49 | 22 | +27 | 58 | Playoffs and 2027 CONCACAF Champions Cup (Note: As winners of Canadian Championship) |
| 3 | Atlético Ottawa | 28 | 13 | 4 | 11 | 42 | 45 | −3 | 43 | Playoffs and 2027 CONCACAF Champions Cup (Note: As either winners of the CPL Shield or the highest-ranked team not already qualified) |
| 4 | Supra du Québec | 28 | 11 | 5 | 12 | 47 | 50 | −3 | 38 | Playoffs |
| 5 | Vancouver FC | 28 | 10 | 7 | 11 | 39 | 37 | +2 | 37 | |
| 6 | Inter Toronto | 28 | 7 | 9 | 12 | 42 | 65 | −23 | 30 | |
| 7 | HFX Wanderers | 28 | 7 | 7 | 14 | 44 | 50 | −6 | 28 | |
| 8 | Pacific FC | 28 | 2 | 9 | 17 | 33 | 62 | −29 | 15 | |

Source: CPL
Rules for classification: 1) Points; 2) Total wins; 3) Head-to-head; 4) Goal differential; 5) Goals for; 6) Away goal differential; 7) Away goals for; 8) Home goal differential; 9) Home goals for; 10) Fewest disciplinary points; 11) Most under-21 domestic player minutes; 12) Drawing of lots.
(S) CPL Shield winner; (V) Canadian Championship winners

=== Results summary ===
| Overall | | | | | | | | Home | | | | | | Away | | | | | |
| Pld | W | D | L | GF | GA | GD | Pts | W | D | L | GF | GA | GD | W | D | L | GF | GA | GD |
|---|---|---|---|---|---|---|---|---|---|---|---|---|---|---|---|---|---|---|---|
| 28 | 11 | 5 | 12 | 47 | 50 | −3 | 38 | 5 | 3 | 6 | 21 | 19 | +2 | 6 | 2 | 6 | 26 | 31 | −5 |

Source: Canadian Premier League

==== Results by round ====
| Round | 1 | 2 | 3 | 4 | 5 | 6 | 7 | 8 | 9 | 10 | 11 | 12 | 13 | 14 | 15 | 16 | 17 | 18 | 19 | 20 | 21 | 22 | 23 | 24 | 25 | 26 | 27 | 28 |
|---|---|---|---|---|---|---|---|---|---|---|---|---|---|---|---|---|---|---|---|---|---|---|---|---|---|---|---|---|
| Ground | A | H | H | H | A | A | H | H | A | A | H | H | A | A | H | H | A | A | H | A | H | A | A | H | A | H | H | A |
| Result | W | L | W | L | L | D | W | D | L | L | L | W | L | W | D | L | L | D | W | L | L | W | L | W | W | D | W | W |
| Position | 4 | 5 | 3 | 4 | 4 | 5 | 5 | 5 | 7 | 7 | 5 | 6 | 7 | 5 | 5 | 5 | 5 | 6 | 5 | 5 | 6 | 5 | 5 | 5 | 5 | 5 | 5 | 4 |

Updated to match(es) played on July 5, 2026. Source: Canadian Premier League
A = Away; H = Home; W = Win; D = Draw; L = Loss

==== Matches ====
| April 11 1 | Pacific FC | 2–3 | FC Supra | Langford, British Columbia |
| 15:00 PT (UTC-07:00) | Baldisimo (yellow card) 49'; Bustos 53'; Heard 69'; Belluz (yellow card) 90+1' (yellow-red card) 90+5' | Report | Auguste (yellow card) 30'; Kwemi 34'; Sissoko (yellow card) 45+2'; Rea 58'; Marcoux 90+7' | Stadium: Starlight Stadium; Attendance: 2,151; Referee: Alain Ruch |

| April 19 2 | FC Supra | 0–1 | Atlético Ottawa | Montreal, Quebec |
| 14:00 EDT (UTC-04:00) | Chrétien (yellow card) 36'; Sissoko (yellow card) 78' | Report | Kozlovskiy (yellow card) 48'; Walker 90+3' | Stadium: Stade du CEPSUM; Attendance: 4,965; Referee: Mario Alayass |

| April 24 3 | FC Supra | 2–1 | HFX Wanderers FC | Montreal, Quebec |
| 19:00 EDT (UTC-04:00) | Chrétien 26'; Abzi (yellow card) 48'; Biello (yellow card) 57'; Mlah 77', (yellow card) 86' | Report | Johnston 12' (pen.), (yellow card) 45+5'; Zitman (yellow card) 17' | Stadium: Stade du CEPSUM; Attendance: 3,803; Referee: Michael Venne |

| May 3 4 | FC Supra | 0–1 | Cavalry FC | Laval, Quebec |
| 15:00 EDT (UTC-04:00) | Ferdinand (yellow card) 12'; Chrétien (yellow card) 45'; Mlah (yellow card) 50'; Abzi (yellow card) 67'; Rea (yellow card) 81'; El Kalkouli (yellow card) 90+5'; Biello (red card) 90+13' | Report | Ntignee (yellow card) 84'; Warschewski 88' (pen.) | Stadium: Stade Boréale; Attendance: 4,008; Referee: Fabrizio Stasolla |

| May 13 5 | Forge FC | 1–0 | FC Supra | Hamilton, Ontario |
| 11:00 EDT (UTC-04:00) | Nimick 56'; Rama (yellow card) 90+1' | Report | Abzi (yellow card) 86' | Stadium: Hamilton Stadium; Attendance: 15,122; Referee: Sebastian Noshinravani |

| May 23 6 | Vancouver FC | 1–1 | FC Supra | Langley, British Columbia |
| 15:00 PT (UTC-07:00) | Polisi (yellow card) 16'; Field (yellow card) 78'; Amissi 87' | Report | Boughanmi (yellow card) 34'; Kaboré (yellow card) 41'; Chrétien 90+5' | Stadium: Willoughby Stadium; Referee: Roberto D'Alesio |

| May 29 7 | FC Supra | 3–1 | Inter Toronto FC | Laval, Quebec |
| 19:00 EDT (UTC-04:00) | Boughanmi (yellow card) 29' (yellow-red card) 90+3'; Mlah 66'; Kwemi 69'; Abzi (yellow card) 75'; Rea 86' | Report | Skublak 71' | Stadium: Stade Boréale; Attendance: 1,718; Referee: Scott Bowman |

| June 6 8 | FC Supra | 1–1 | Pacific FC | Quebec City, Quebec |
| 19:00 EDT (UTC-04:00) | Rea 54'; Mlah (yellow card) 62'; Sissoko (yellow card) 78'; Abzi (yellow card) 85' | Report | Lajeunesse (yellow card) 20'; Greco-Taylor (yellow card) 39'; Díaz 43'; Toualy (yellow card) 45+1' | Stadium: Stade TELUS; Referee: Carly Shaw-Maclaren |

| June 9 9 | Atlético Ottawa | 5–3 | FC Supra | Ottawa, Ontario |
| 19:00 EDT (UTC-04:00) | Assi 3'; Aparicio 38'; Tabla 44'; García 79', 90+8' | Report | Rea 3'; Boughanmi 38'; Kwemi 44' | Stadium: TD Place Stadium; Referee: Ben Hoskins |

| July 5 11 | FC Supra | 1–2 | Forge FC | Laval, Quebec |
| 13:00 EDT (UTC-04:00) | Auguste (yellow card) 42'; Kwemi 56'; Bey (yellow card) 69' | Report | Nimick (yellow card) 12' (goal) 43'; Borges (yellow card) 65'; Filion 66'; Aromatario (yellow card) 76'; Ampomah (yellow card) 89' | Stadium: Stade Boréale; Referee: Ben Hoskins |

| July 17 12 | FC Supra | 1–5 | Vancouver FC | Laval, Quebec |
| 19:00 EDT (UTC-04:00) | Biello (yellow card) 12'; Bayiha 46'; Bey (red card) 90' | Report | Pecile (yellow card) 11', (goal) 21'; Campagna 32'; Mousset 53' (pen.); Campbell 82'; Traore 86' | Stadium: Stade Boréale; Referee: Michael Venne |

| July 24 13 | HFX Wanderers FC | 2–3 | FC Supra | Halifax, Nova Scotia |
| 19:00 ADT (UTC-03:00) | Kachwele 28'; Linder 45'; Meilleur-Giguère (yellow card) 76' | Report | Chrétien (yellow card) 40'; Kwemi 65', 67', 77' (pen.) | Stadium: Wanderers Grounds; Referee: Fabrizio Stasolla |

| July 28 10 (Postponed) | Cavalry FC | 2–1 | FC Supra | Foothills County, Alberta |
| 19:00 MDT (UTC-06:00) | Edwards 3'; Laing (yellow card) 43'; Camargo (yellow card) 53'; Đidić 90+3', (yellow card) 90+4'; Antoniuk (yellow card) 90+8' | Report | Abzi (yellow card) 39'; Ferdinand 55', (yellow card) 90+8' | Stadium: ATCO Field; Referee: Ben Hoskins |

| July 31 14 | Pacific FC | 1–2 | FC Supra | Langford, British Columbia |
| 19:00 PT (UTC-07:00) | Bustos 30', (red card) 80'; Heard (red card) 42' | Report | Kwemi 45'; Mlah 84' | Stadium: Starlight Stadium; Referee: Iwan-Nikita Jecanski |

| August 8 15 | FC Supra | 1–1 | Cavalry FC | Montreal, Quebec |
| | | Report | | Stadium: Complexe Sportif Claude-Robillard |

| August 16 16 | FC Supra | 1–2 | Atlético Ottawa | Montreal, Quebec |
| | | Report | | Stadium: Complexe Sportif Claude-Robillard |

| August 19 17 | Forge FC | 3–2 | FC Supra | Hamilton, Ontario |
| | | Report | | Stadium: Hamilton Stadium |

| August 23 18 | Inter Toronto FC | 1–1 | FC Supra | Toronto, Ontario |
| | | Report | | Stadium: York Lions Stadium |

| August 29 19 | FC Supra | 1–0 | Forge FC | Laval, Quebec |
| | | Report | | Stadium: Stade Boréale |

| September 6 20 | Vancouver FC | 3–2 | FC Supra | Langley, British Columbia |
| | | Report | | Stadium: Willoughby Stadium |

| September 11 21 | FC Supra | 0–2 | HFX Wanderers FC | Laval, Quebec |
| | | Report | | Stadium: Stade Boréale |

| September 20 22 | Atlético Ottawa | 0–2 | FC Supra | Ottawa, Ontario |
| | | Report | | Stadium: TD Place Stadium |

| September 25 23 | Cavalry FC | 6–0 | FC Supra | Foothills County, Alberta |
| | | Report | | Stadium: ATCO Field |

| October 3 24 | FC Supra | 5–0 | Pacific FC | Laval, Quebec |
| | | Report | | Stadium: Stade Boréale |

| October 7 25 | Inter Toronto FC | 1–2 | FC Supra | Toronto, Ontario |
| | | Report | | Stadium: York Lions Stadium |

| October 10 26 | FC Supra | 2–2 | Vancouver FC | Laval, Quebec |
| | | Report | | Stadium: Stade Boréale |

| October 17 27 | FC Supra | 3–0 | Inter Toronto FC | Laval, Quebec |
| | | Report | | Stadium: Stade Boréale |

| October 25 28 | HFX Wanderers FC | 3–4 | FC Supra | Halifax, Nova Scotia |
| | | Report | | Stadium: Wanderers Grounds |

==== Playoffs ====
| November 1 SF leg 1 | FC Supra | 2–1 | Cavalry FC | Laval, Quebec |
| 16:00 EDT (UTC-04:00) | Brault-Guillard 4'; Kobza 9' (o.g.); Biello (yellow card) 40' | Report | Baldisimo (yellow card) 14'; Warschewski 45+1'; Paton (yellow card) 77' | Stadium: Stade Boréale; Attendance: 4,432; Referee: Yusri Rudolf |

| November 7 SF leg 2 | Cavalry FC | 2–0 (3–2 agg.) | FC Supra | Foothills County, Alberta |
| 16:00 EDT (UTC-04:00) | Elva 25'; Kamdem (yellow card) 38'; Musse 60'; Baldisimo (yellow card) 74' | Report | Biello (yellow card) 65', (red card) 90+9'; Kwemi (yellow card) 70', (yellow card) 90+10' (red card) | Stadium: ATCO Field; Attendance: 5,199; Referee: Michael Venne |

=== Canadian Championship ===
Supra du Québec begin their first Canadian Championship campaign with a preliminary round tie round tie against Woodbridge Strikers of the Ontario Premier League.

==== Preliminary round ====
Win Draw Loss

| May 8 Preliminary round | FC Supra | 3–1 | Woodbridge Strikers | Laval, QC |
| 18:00 EDT (UTC-04:00) | Abzi 16' (pen.); Sissoko 41'; Rea (yellow card) 42'; Choinière 78' | Report | Tareke (yellow card) 16'; Spizzirri 29'; Crocco (yellow card) 83' | Stadium: Stade Boréale; Attendance: 1,300; Referee: Mathieu Souaré |

==== Quarter-finals ====
| July 8 First leg | FC Supra | 3–1 | Atlético Ottawa | Laval, QC |
| 19:00 EDT (UTC-04:00) | Choinière 29'; Rea 50'; Bey (yellow card) 77'; Condé 83', (yellow card) 90+6'; Auguste (yellow card) 88' | Report | Aparicio (yellow card) 75'; Timóteo 86'; Kozlovskiy (yellow card) 90+6' | Stadium: Stade Boréale; Attendance: 1,718; Referee: Sebastian Noshinravani |

| August 11 Second leg | Atlético Ottawa | – (– agg.) | FC Supra | Ottawa, ON |
| --:-- PM EDT | | | | Stadium: TD Place Stadium |
