= 2025 Valour FC season =

Valour FC
2025 season
- President: Wade Miller
- Head coach: Phillip Dos Santos
- Stadium: Princess Auto Stadium
- Canadian Premier League: 6th
- CPL playoffs: DNQ
- Canadian Championship: Quarter-finals
Home colours	Away colours

The 2025 Valour FC season was the seventh and final season in the history of Valour FC. In addition to the Canadian Premier League, the club competed in the Canadian Championship.

== Current squad ==
As of August 26, 2025.

No.	Name	Nationality	Position(s)	Date of birth (age)	Previous club	Notes
Goalkeepers
1	Eleias Himaras	(Canada)	GK	March 8, 2002 (aged 23)	(Canada) York United	
50	Jonathan Viscosi	(Canada)	GK	March 18, 1991 (aged 34)	(Finland) VPS	
99	Emil Gazdov	(Canada)	GK	September 11, 2003 (aged 22)	(Canada) CF Montréal	Loan
Defenders
2	Roberto Alarcón	(Spain)	RB	April 21, 1998 (aged 27)	(Canada) Cavalry FC	
3	Rocco Romeo	(Canada)	CB	March 25, 2000 (aged 25)	(Canada) Vancouver FC	
4	Diego Konincks	(Netherlands)	CB	November 30, 2000 (aged 25)	(United States) Chicago Fire FC II	INT, Loan
5	Kelsey Egwu	(Canada)	FB	February 1, 2004 (aged 21)	(Estonia) Narva Trans	Loan
13	Zachary Fernandez	(Canada)	RB	September 24, 2001 (aged 24)	(Canada) HFX Wanderers	
23	Gianfranco Facchineri	(Canada)	CB	April 27, 2002 (aged 23)	(Canada) Windsor City FC	
30	Themi Antonoglou	(Canada)	LB / LW	June 2, 2001 (aged 24)	(Canada) Toronto FC	
Midfielders
6	Dante Campbell	(Canada)	DM / CB	May 22, 1999 (aged 26)	(United States) LA Galaxy II	
8	Diogo Ressurreição	(Portugal)	MF	August 15, 2000 (aged 25)	(Portugal) Vitória Guimarães B	INT
11	Kris Twardek	(Canada)	RW	March 8, 1997 (aged 28)	(Canada) Atlético Ottawa	
17	Jordan Faria	(Canada)	CM	June 13, 2000 (aged 25)	(Canada) Toronto FC II	
18	Markiyan Voytsekhovskyy	(Ukraine) / (Canada)	AM / LW / RW	November 27, 2003 (aged 22)	(Canada) York United	
20	Xavier Venâncio	(Portugal)	CM / DM	May 29, 1999 (aged 26)	(Italy) Chieri	INT
21	Myles Morgan	(Canada)	CM	June 20, 2005 (aged 20)	(Canada) Whitecaps FC 2	U21
27	Raphael Ohin	(Ghana)	CM	May 25, 1995 (aged 30)	(Canada) WSA Winnipeg	
28	Bruno Figueiredo	(Portugal)	CM	July 9, 1999 (aged 26)	(Portugal) União de Santarém	INT
64	Safwane Mlah	(Canada)	AM	December 8, 2001 (aged 24)	(Canada) CS Saint-Laurent	
80	Kianz Froese	(Canada)	AM / CF	April 16, 1996 (aged 29)	(Germany) SV Wehen Wiesbaden	
Forwards
7	Kian Williams	(England)	CF / AM	January 7, 2000 (aged 25)	(Iceland) Keflavík	INT
9	Erik Pop	(Romania) (Canada)	CF	January 30, 2006 (aged 19)	(Germany) Karlsruher U19	U21
19	Jevontae Layne	(Canada)	CF	September 21, 2001 (aged 24)	(Canada) TMU Bold	U-S
	Oskar van Hattum	(New Zealand)	CF / LW / RW	April 14, 2002 (aged 23)	(Republic of Ireland) Sligo Rovers	INT

== Transfers ==
=== In ===
==== Transferred in ====
No.	Pos.	Player	From club	Fee/notes	Date	Source
23	DF	(Canada) Gianfranco Facchineri		U-Sports contract retained; signed pro contract	December 11, 2024	
	GK	(Canada) Eleias Himaras	(Canada) York United	Free	January 7, 2025	
	MF	(Canada) Kris Twardek	(Canada) Atlético Ottawa	Undisclosed fee	January 10, 2025	
	DF	(Canada) Rocco Romeo	(Canada) Vancouver FC	Free	January 14, 2025	
	FW	(Romania) Erik Pop	(Germany) Karlsruher U19	Free	January 31, 2025	
	MF	(Portugal) Xavier Venâncio	(Italy) Chieri	Free	February 4, 2025	
	MF	(Portugal) Bruno Figueiredo	(Portugal) União de Santarém	Free	February 13, 2025	
	DF	(Canada) Zachary Fernandez	(Canada) HFX Wanderers	Free	February 25, 2025	
	MF	(Canada) Myles Morgan	(Canada) Whitecaps FC 2	Free	March 5, 2025	
	FW	(Canada) Jevontae Layne	(Canada) TMU Bold	Selected 1st in the 2025 CPL–U Sports Draft, U-Sports contract	April 1, 2025	
	MF	(Cameroon) Wesley Wandje	(Canada) Montreal Carabins	U-Sports contract	April 10, 2025	
	MF	(Canada) Kianz Froese	(Germany) SV Wehen Wiesbaden	Free	June 18, 2025	
	MF	(Ukraine) Markiyan Voytsekhovskyy	(Canada) York United	Free	July 17, 2025	
	FW	(New Zealand) Oskar van Hattum	(Republic of Ireland) Sligo Rovers	Free	August 26, 2025	

==== Loans in ====
No.	Pos.	Player	Loaned from	Fee/notes	Date	Source
	DF	(Canada) Kelsey Egwu	(Estonia) Narva Trans	Season-long loan	February 11, 2025	
	GK	(Canada) Emil Gazdov	(Canada) CF Montréal	Loaned until the end of the season	August 16, 2025	
	DF	(Netherlands) Diego Konincks	(United States) Chicago Fire FC II	Loaned until the end of the season	August 19, 2025	

==== Draft picks ====
Valour FC selected the following players in the 2025 CPL–U Sports Draft. Draft picks are not automatically signed to the team roster. Only those who are signed to a contract will be listed as transfers in.

Round	Selection	Pos.	Player	Nationality	University
1	1	FW	Jevontae Layne	Canada	Toronto Metropolitan
2	9	DF	Ibrahim Chami	Lebanon	McGill

=== Out ===
==== Transferred out ====
No.	Pos.	Player	To club	Fee/notes	Date	Source
11	MF	(Canada) Noah Verhoeven	(Canada) Atlético Ottawa	Loan expired	November 10, 2024	
1	GK	(Zimbabwe) Darlington Murasiranwa		Contract expired	December 31, 2024	
13	DF	(Australia) Tass Mourdoukoutas	(Australia) Perth Glory	Contract expired	December 31, 2024	
8	MF	(United States) Juan Pablo Sanchez		Contract expired	December 31, 2024	
21	MF	(Canada) Marcello Polisi	(United States) Detroit City FC	Contract expired	December 31, 2024	
3	DF	(Canada) Jordan Haynes		Option declined	December 31, 2024	
4	DF	(Germany) Charalampos Chantzopoulos		Option declined	December 31, 2024	
16	FW	(Canada) Joe Hanson	(Republic of Ireland) Treaty United F.C.	Option declined	December 31, 2024	
9	FW	(Australia) Jordan Swibel		Option declined	December 31, 2024	
19	FW	(Canada) Abdul Binate		Option declined	December 31, 2024	
25	FW	(Canada) Loïc Kwemi	(Canada) CS LaSalle	Option declined	December 31, 2024	
24	MF	(Canada) Zachary Sukunda	(Estonia) Tallinna Kalev	Contract terminated by mutual consent	January 16, 2025	
10	FW	(Canada) Shaan Hundal	(Canada) York United	Contract terminated by mutual consent	July 17, 2025	

== Competitions ==
=== Canadian Premier League ===
==== Table ====
Pos	Team	Pld	W	D	L	GF	GA	GD	Pts	Qualification
1	Forge (S)	28	16	10	2	51	22	+29	58	First semifinal and 2026 CONCACAF Champions Cup
2	Atlético Ottawa (C)	28	15	11	2	54	28	+26	56	First semifinal
3	Cavalry	28	11	9	8	47	36	+11	42	Quarterfinal
4	HFX Wanderers	28	11	6	11	41	34	+7	39	Play-in round
5	York United	28	10	8	10	43	38	+5	38	Play-in round
6	Valour	28	7	5	16	35	62	−27	26	
7	Pacific	28	5	8	15	30	59	−29	23	
8	Vancouver	28	4	9	15	35	57	−22	21	2026 CONCACAF Champions Cup (Note: Vancouver FC qualified for the Champions Cup as the runners-up of the 2025 Canadian Championship, due to the winners, Vancouver Whitecaps FC, qualifying through Major League Soccer.)

Source: CanPL
Rules for classification: 1) Points; 2) Total number of wins; 3) Head-to-head; 4) Goal differential; 5) Goals for; 6) Away goals differential; 7) Away goals for; 8) Home goals differential; 9) Home goals for; 10) Fewest disciplinary points; 11) Most under-21 domestic player minutes; 12) Drawing of lots.
(C) Champion (qualified to Champions Cup Round one); (S) CPL Shield winner (qualified to Champions Cup Round one)
