= Ismaël Yeo =

Canadian soccer player (born 2005)

Personal information
- Full name: Tenena Ismaël Yeo
- Date of birth: January 31, 2005 (age 21)
- Place of birth: Montréal, Québec, Canada
- Height: 6 ft 1 in (1.85 m)
- Position: Defender

Team information
- Current team: FC Supra du Québec
- Number: 29

Youth career
- FS Salaberry
- CS Saint-Laurent
- CF Montréal

College career
Years	Team	Apps	(Gls)
2025	Seattle Redhawks	13	(1)

Senior career*
Years	Team	Apps	(Gls)
2023	CF Montréal U23		
2025	CS St-Laurent	12	(0)
2026–	FC Supra du Québec	3	(0)
- * Club domestic league appearances and goals as of April 24, 2026

Tenena Ismaël Yeo (born January 31, 2005) is a Canadian soccer player who plays for FC Supra du Québec in the Canadian Premier League.

== Early life ==
Yeo played youth soccer with FS Salaberry, later joining CS Saint-Laurent at the age of 16, helping them win the U17 national championship in 2022. He later joined the CF Montréal Academy.

== College career ==
In 2025, Yeo began attending Seattle University, where he played for the men's soccer team. On September 13, 2025, he scored his first goal in a 4–0 victory over the UC Davis Aggies. At the end of the season, he was named to the WCC All-Rookie Team.

== Club career ==
Yeo began his senior career in Ligue1 Québec with CF Montréal U23 and CS St-Laurent.

In January 2026, he signed with FC Supra du Québec in the Canadian Premier League on a two-year contract with an option for 2028. On April 24, 2026, he suffered an ACL injury during the match against HFX Wanderers FC, causing him to miss the remainder of the 2026 season.
