= Riad Bey =

Algerian footballer (born 2001)

Personal information
- Date of birth: August 9, 2001 (age 25)
- Place of birth: Algiers, Algeria
- Height: 1.84 m (6 ft 0 in)
- Position: Forward

Team information
- Current team: FC Supra du Québec
- Number: 77

Youth career
- CS Braves d'Ahuntsic

Senior career*
Years	Team	Apps	(Gls)
2019–2023	FC Laval (Note: CS Fabrose became FC Laval in 2021)	36+	(14+)
2023–2024	CS St-Laurent		
2024–2025	CD Almodôvar	2	(0)
2025	CS St-Laurent	7	(0)
2026–	FC Supra du Québec	11	(0)
- * Club domestic league appearances and goals as of August 17, 2026

Riad Bey (born August 9, 2001) is an Algerian footballer who plays as a forward for FC Supra du Québec in the Canadian Premier League.

== Early life ==
Bey played youth soccer in Canada with CS Braves d'Ahuntsic.

== Career ==
In 2019, Bey began playing with CS Fabrose (later re-branded as FC Laval) in the PLSQ. He helped them win the league cup in 2019, scoring in the final in their 2-0 victory over CS Mont-Royal Outremont. In 2023, Bey was selected as part of the PLSQ all-stars to face CF Montreal in a friendly match.

Midway through the 2023 season, he moved to CS St-Laurent. In 2024, he began the season with CS St-Laurent in Ligue1 Québec, before joining, in June 2024, Portuguese club CD Almodôvar. In 2025, he returned to CS St-Laurent.

In March 2026, Bey signed with FC Supra du Québec in the Canadian Premier League.

== Career statistics ==
As of October 27, 2025

Appearances and goals by club, season and competition
Club	Season	League			Playoffs		National cup		League cup		Total	
Club	Season	Division	Apps	Goals	Apps	Goals	Apps	Goals	Apps	Goals	Apps	Goals
FC Laval	2019	Première ligue de soccer du Québec	2	0	—		—		3	1	5	1
FC Laval	2020	Première ligue de soccer du Québec	4	2	—		—		—		4	2
FC Laval	2021	Première ligue de soccer du Québec	11	4	—		—		—		11	4
FC Laval	2022	Première ligue de soccer du Québec	19	8	—		—		2	1	5	1
FC Laval	2023	Ligue1 Québec	?	?	—		1	0	—		1+	0+
FC Laval	Total		36+	14+	0	0	1	0	5+	2+	42+	16+
CS St-Laurent	2023	Ligue1 Québec	?	?	—		—		—		1+	0+
CS St-Laurent	2024	Ligue1 Québec	?	?	—		3	0	1	1	4+	1+
CD Almodôvar	2024-25	AF Beja 1ª divisão	2	0	—		—		—		2	0
CS St-Laurent	2025	Ligue1 Québec	7	0	—		—		3	1	10	1
FC Supra du Québec	2026	Canadian Premier League	5	0	0	0	1	0	—		6	0
Career total			50+	14+	0	0	5	0	9	4	64+	18+
