= Oussama Boughanmi =

Oussama Boughanmi may refer to:

- Oussama Boughanmi (handballer) (born 1990), Tunisian handball player
- Oussama Boughanmi (footballer) (born 1990), Tunisian footballer
