= Bakary Kaboré =

French footballer (born 2000)

Personal information
- Full name: Bakary Stephane Leonard Kaboré
- Date of birth: November 19, 2000 (age 25)
- Place of birth: Nogent-sur-Marne, France
- Position: Forward

Youth career
- –2018: ES Nanterre
- 2018–2020: Le Havre

Senior career*
Years	Team	Apps	(Gls)
2020–2021	RM Hamm Benfica		
2022–2023	AS Quetigny		
2025	CS St-Laurent	15	(7)
2026	FC Supra du Québec	7	(0)
- * Club domestic league appearances and goals as of August 7, 2026

Bakary Stephane Leonard Kaboré (born November 19, 2000) is a French footballer who plays as a forward.

== Early life ==
Kaboré played youth football with ES Nanterre, before joining the youth system of Le Havre in 2018.

== Club career ==
In August 2020, Kaboré signed with RM Hamm Benfica in the Luxembourg Division of Honour. Despite signing a two-year contract, he opted to leave the club after one season. He then went to Germany to trial with 1. FC Nürnberg II, but was not offered a contract.

In July 2022, he signed with French club AS Quetigny in the Championnat National 3.

In 2025, he played with CS St-Laurent in Ligue1 Québec.

In January 2026, he signed with FC Supra du Québec in the Canadian Premier League, on a one-year contract with an option for 2027. In August 2026, he agreed to a mutual termination of the remainder of his contract.
