= 2022 Première ligue de soccer du Québec season =

Première ligue de soccer du Québec Men's Division
- Season: 2022
- Dates: 7 May – 2 October
- Champions: FC Laval
- Coupe PLSQ: AS Blainville
- Matches: 132
- Goals: 427 (3.23 per match)
- Top goalscorer: Loïc Kwemi (19 goals)

The 2022 Première ligue de soccer du Québec season was the eleventh season of play for the Première ligue de soccer du Québec, a Division 3 semi-professional soccer league in the Canadian soccer pyramid and the highest level of soccer based in the Canadian province of Québec.

FC Laval won their first league title and qualified for the 2023 Canadian Championship, while AS Blainville won the Coupe PLSQ for the third time. CS Mont-Royal Outremont competed in the 2022 Canadian Championship as the league's representative as 2021 league champions.

== Changes from 2021 ==
The 2022 season will have its greatest number of participating teams with 12 teams. CS Saint-Laurent and the CF Montréal U23 join as expansion franchises. CS Lanaudière-Nord (who previously competed in the PLSQ until 2015 as FC L'Assomption-Lanaudière prior to their merger with ARS Laser) returns to the league, replacing the district team FC Lanaudière. CS Monteuil became AS Laval following a merger with another non-PLSQ club. Ottawa South United will return to the league full-time after being forced to withdraw midway through the 2021 season due to the COVID-19 pandemic.

Each team will play each other home and away for a 22 match season. The league champion will qualify for the 2023 Canadian Championship and the top four teams will qualify for the Coupe PLSQ.

== Main Division ==
=== Teams ===
Twelve teams will participate in the 2022 season. The league champion will earn a place in the 2023 Canadian Championship.

Team	City	Stadium
A.S. Blainville	Blainville, Laurentides	Parc Blainville
Celtix du Haut-Richelieu	Saint-Jean-sur-Richelieu, Montérégie	Stade Alphonse-Desjardins
CS Lanaudière-Nord	Joliette, Lanaudière	André-Courcelles Stadium & École secondaire Barthélemy-Joliette
AS Laval	Laval, Laval	Parc de Lausanne
FC Laval	Laval, Laval	Collège Montmorency
CS Longueuil	Longueuil, Montérégie	Parc Laurier
CF Montréal U23	Montréal, Montréal	Centre Nutrilait
CS Mont-Royal Outremont	Mount Royal, Montréal	Parc Recreatif de TMR
CS Saint-Laurent	Saint-Laurent, Montreal	Vanier College Stadium
CS St-Hubert	Saint-Hubert, Montérégie	Centre Sportif Roseanne-Laflamme
Ottawa South United	Ottawa, Ontario	Quinn's Point Field & Richcraft Recreation Complex
Royal-Sélect de Beauport	Quebec City, Capitale-Nationale	Stade Beauport

=== Standings ===
Pos	Team	Pld	W	D	L	GF	GA	GD	Pts	Qualification
1	FC Laval (C)	22	16	5	1	52	13	+39	53	2022 Coupe PLSQ and 2023 Canadian Championship
2	CS Saint-Laurent	22	16	1	5	58	26	+32	49	2022 Coupe PLSQ
3	A.S. Blainville	22	14	2	6	51	23	+28	44	2022 Coupe PLSQ
4	CS Mont-Royal Outremont	22	12	5	5	36	19	+17	41	2022 Coupe PLSQ
5	CS Longueuil	22	12	2	8	31	37	−6	38 (Note: CS Longueil beat CF Montreal U23 on head-to-head points (6-0))	
6	CF Montréal U23	22	12	2	8	47	32	+15	38	
7	CS St-Hubert	22	8	4	10	28	30	−2	28	
8	Royal-Sélect de Beauport	22	7	5	10	32	27	+5	26	
9	AS Laval	22	7	4	11	25	33	−8	25	
10	Celtix du Haut-Richelieu	22	3	7	12	25	47	−22	16	
11	CS Lanaudière-Nord	22	3	3	16	19	61	−42	12	
12	Ottawa South United	22	1	2	19	23	79	−56	5	

Source: PLSQ
Rules for classification: 1) points; 2) total wins; 3) head-to-head points; 4) goal differential; 5) most goals
(C) Champions
Notes:

Note: The match on October 1 between CS Mont-Royal Outremont and CS Saint-Laurent was abandoned before completion and initially recorded as a double forfeit (CSMRO had been leading 2-1 at the time of abandonment). After an appeal, the match was changed to a 3-0 forfeit victory for CS Mont-Royal Outremont.

==== Top scorers ====
Rank	Player	Club	Goals
1	Loïc Adrien Kwemi	CS Saint-Laurent	19
2	Yann Régis Toualy	CS Saint-Laurent	15
3	Pierre-Rudolph Mayard	AS Blainville	14
3	Adama Makan Sissoko	FC Laval	14
5	Arthur Lionel Polla Phudje	Ottawa South United	9
6	Joseph Greguy Saint Simon	CS Mont-Royal Outremont	8
6	Riad Bey	FC Laval	8
8	Josué Desire Youta	FC Laval	7
8	Babacar Thiaw Laye Diop	CS St-Hubert	7
8	Yves Wesley Wandje Djomze	CS Saint-Laurent	7

==== Awards ====
Award	Player (club)	Ref
Ballon d'or (Best Player)	Loïc Adrien Kwemi (CS Saint-Laurent)	
Ballon d'argent (2nd Best Player)	Renan Dias Manini (CS Mont-Royal Outremont)	
Ballon de bronze (3rd Best Player)	Kevin Lenours (CS Longueuil)	
Golden Boot (Top Scorer - 19 goals)	Loïc Adrien Kwemi (CS Saint-Laurent)	
Coach of the Year	Boubacar Coulibaly (FC Laval)	

=== Coupe PLSQ ===
Semi-finals
1	FC Laval	2
4	CS Mont-Royal Outremont	1
2	CS Saint-Laurent	1
3	AS Blainville	2

Final
1	FC Laval	1
3	AS Blainville	3

Semi-finals

October 15, 2022	FC Laval	2–1	CS Mont-Royal Outremont	Laval, Quebec
7:00 PM	Bey; Keita		Oliveri	Stadium: Centre Sportif Bois-de-Boulogne; Referee: Robert D'Alesio

October 15, 2022	CS Saint-Laurent	1–2	AS Blainville	Blainville, Quebec
8:00 PM	Boughanmi		Bruce; Cobuzzi	Stadium: Parc Blainville; Attendance: 0 Referee: Renzo Paolo Villanueva Tanaka

Final

October 22, 2022	FC Laval	1–3	AS Blainville	Laval, Quebec
8:00 PM	Sissoko 12'	Report	Syla 22'; El Harchali 27'; Khenoussi 38'	Stadium: Centre Sportif Bois-de-Boulogne; Referee: Michael Venne

=== Friendlies ===
In July and August, HFX Wanderers U23, the U23 side of Canadian Premier League club HFX Wanderers FC, and Sunderland U21, the U21 side of English Championship side Sunderland each played two friendly matches against PLSQ opposition.

July 27, 2022	HFX Wanderers U23	2–3	CS St-Hubert	Halifax, Nova Scotia
6:30 PM	Robinson 55'; Green 62'	Report	Amla 18', 37'; Ghamraoui 45'	Stadium: Wanderers Grounds

August 3, 2022	HFX Wanderers U23	1–0	CS Saint-Laurent	Halifax, Nova Scotia
5:30 PM	Elomrani 13'	Report		Stadium: Wanderers Grounds

August 5, 2022	(England) Sunderland U21	2–1	CF Montréal U23	Moncton, New Brunswick
7:00 PM	Goal	Report	Ngogang 81'	Stadium: Croix-Bleue Medavie Stadium; Attendance: 3,000

August 7, 2022	(England) Sunderland U21	2–1	CF Montréal U23	Charlottetown, Prince Edward Island
1:00 PM	Goal	Report	Marinaro 89'	Stadium: University of Prince Edward Island

== Reserve Division ==
The league will operate a reserve division. Each team, apart from the CF Montréal Academy, will operate a reserve team, playing each other home-and-away. CS St-Hubert, RS Beauport, and Celtix du Haut-Richelieu withdrew from the division in September, with their final matches awarded as forfeit losses.

Pos	Team	Pld	W	D	L	GF	GA	GD	Pts
1	CS Saint-Laurent Reserves (C)	19	15	3	1	44	19	+25	48
2	AS Laval Reserves	20	13	5	2	54	24	+30	44
3	A.S. Blainville Reserves	20	13	4	3	45	26	+19	43
4	FC Laval Reserves	20	13	2	5	55	32	+23	41
5	CS St-Hubert Reserves	19	7	2	10	27	41	−14	23
6	Royal-Sélect de Beauport Reserves	19	7	2	10	35	40	−5	23
7	CS Longueuil Reserves	19	5	4	10	30	35	−5	19
8	CS Lanaudière-Nord Reserves	20	5	3	12	25	32	−7	18
9	CS Mont-Royal Outremont Reserves	19	5	2	12	25	37	−12	17
10	Celtix du Haut-Richelieu Reserves	20	4	3	13	26	47	−21	15
11	Ottawa South United Reserves	19	2	4	13	22	55	−33	10

Source: TSI Sports
Rules for classification: 1) points; 2) total wins; 3) head-to-head points; 4) goal differential; 5) most goals
(C) Champions

Note:The match on September 3 between CS St-Hubert and Celtix du Haut-Richelieu resulted in a double forfeit.

=== Awards ===
Award	Player (club)	Ref
Ballon d'or (Best Player)	Ryan Moteng Kamsu (FC Laval Reserves)	
Ballon d'argent (2nd Best Player)	Zineddine Bey (AS Laval Reserves)	
Ballon de bronze (3rd Best Player)	Mahdi Djellab (CS St-Laurent Reserves)	
Golden Boot (Top Scorer - 14 goals)	Zineddine Bey (AS Laval Reserves)	
