= Montreal Impact =

Montreal Impact may refer to:

- CF Montréal, current MLS team, formerly known as Montreal Impact from 2012 to 2020
- Montreal Impact (1993–2011), the former team that played in the second-tier before becoming the above MLS team

== Reserve teams of the club ==
- Montreal Impact Academy, the academy of the above clubs
- Montreal Impact U23, the top team of the academy that previously played in the Premier Development League in 2014
- FC Montreal, the former reserve team of the above MLS team in 2015 and 2016
