= Alessandro Biello =

Canadian soccer player (born 2006)

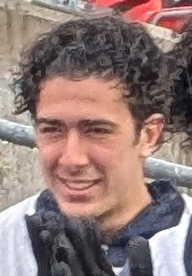
- Biello in 2025

Personal information
- Full name: Alessandro Simone Biello
- Date of birth: April 7, 2006 (age 20)
- Place of birth: Montreal, Quebec, Canada
- Height: 6 ft 1 in (1.85 m)
- Position: Midfielder

Team information
- Current team: FC Supra du Québec
- Number: 6

Youth career
- FC St-Léonard
- 2014–2024: CF Montréal

Senior career*
Years	Team	Apps	(Gls)
2022–2023	CF Montréal U23	10	(0)
2024–2025	CF Montréal	2	(0)
2024	→ CF Montréal U23	3	(1)
2025	→ HFX Wanderers (loan)	21	(0)
2026–	FC Supra du Québec	12	(0)

International career^{‡}
2023	Canada U17	6	(1)
2024	Canada U20	6	(1)
- * Club domestic league appearances and goals as of August 17, 2026 ‡ National team caps and goals as of July 30, 2024

Alessandro Simone Biello (born April 7, 2006) is a Canadian professional soccer player who plays as a midfielder for FC Supra du Québec in the Canadian Premier League.

== Early life ==
Biello began playing youth soccer at age four with FC St-Léonard. In 2014, he joined the Montreal Impact Academy (later renamed the CF Montréal Academy) at U8 level. In December 2023, he went on a three-week training stint with the academy of Italian club Bologna.

== Club career ==
In 2023, he played with CF Montréal U23 in the Ligue1 Québec, making nine appearances.

In March 2024, he signed a two-year homegrown player contract with options for 2026 to 2028 with CF Montréal in Major League Soccer. On May 7, 2024, he made his first team debut in a substitute appearance against Forge FC in the 2024 Canadian Championship. He made his league debut on May 15 against the Columbus Crew.

In February 2025, he went on loan with Canadian Premier League side HFX Wanderers for the 2025 season. Several CPL sides were interested in adding him on loan, but the presence of head coach Patrice Gheisar convinced him to join HFX. He made his debut on April 13 against York United FC. At the end of the 2025 season, CF Montréal declined his contract option for 2026, but announced he would be invited to their 2026 training camp.

In January 2026, he signed with Canadian Premier League club FC Supra du Québec.

== International career ==
In October 2022, Biello made his debut with the Canadian program, attending a camp with the Canadian U17 team. He later represented the U17s at the 2023 CONCACAF U-17 Championship and the 2023 FIFA U-17 World Cup.

In February 2024, Biello was named to the Canada U20 team for the 2024 CONCACAF U-20 Championship qualifying tournament. In July 2024, he was named to the final roster for the tournament.

In November 2024, he was called up to the Canada senior team for the first time, for a training camp.

== Personal life ==
Biello is the son of Mauro Biello and the nephew of Nick De Santis, both former Canadian national team players. He is of Italian descent.

== Career statistics ==
As of October 27, 2025

Club statistics
Club	Season	League			Playoffs		Domestic Cup		Other		Total	
Club	Season	Division	Apps	Goals	Apps	Goals	Apps	Goals	Apps	Goals	Apps	Goals
CF Montréal U23	2022	PLSQ	1	0	—		—		—		1	0
CF Montréal U23	2023	Ligue1 Québec	9	0	—		—		0	0	9	0
CF Montréal U23	Total		10	0	0	0	0	0	0	0	10	0
CF Montréal	2024	Major League Soccer	2	0	—		2	0	0	0	4	0
CF Montréal U23 (loan)	2024	Ligue1 Québec	3	1	—		—		0	0	3	1
HFX Wanderers (loan)	2025	Canadian Premier League	21	0	0	0	1	0	—		22	0
Career total			36	1	0	0	3	0	0	0	39	1
