= Olivier Correa =

Canadian soccer player (born 2002)

Personal information
- Full name: Olivier Andres Correa
- Date of birth: March 19, 2002 (age 24)
- Place of birth: Montréal, Québec, Canada
- Height: 1.78 m (5 ft 10 in)
- Position: Midfielder

Team information
- Current team: FC Supra du Québec

Youth career
- AS Pierrefonds

College career
| Years | Team | Apps | (Gls) |
| 2020–2024 | Jacksonville Dolphins | 65 | (19) |

Senior career*
| Years | Team | Apps | (Gls) |
| 2024 | West Texas FC | 10 | (7) |
| 2025 | CS St-Laurent | 17 | (8) |
| 2026– | FC Supra du Québec | 2 | (0) |
- * Club domestic league appearances and goals as of August 17, 2026

Olivier Andres Correa (born March 19, 2002) is a Canadian soccer player who plays for FC Supra du Québec in the Canadian Premier League.

== Early life ==
Correa played youth soccer with AS Pierrefonds in Quebec, before later attending high school at Montverde Academy in the United States.

== College career ==
In the fall of 2020, Correa began attending Jacksonville University, where he played for the men's soccer team. In March 2021, he was named the ASUN Player of the Week. At the end of his freshman season, he was named to the ASUN All-Freshman Team, the All-ASUN First Team, and the ASUN All-Tournament Team. He was named to the ASUN All-Preseason team in 2021 and 2022. At the end of the 2023 season, he was named to the All-ASUN Second Team.

== Club career ==
In 2024, Correa played with West Texas FC in the National Premier Soccer League. He scored eight goals and added eight assists in 12 games, being named the Lone Star Conference MVP and the NPSL Golden Ball winner as the league's top player.

In 2025, he played with CS St-Laurent in Ligue1 Québec.

In March 2026, he signed with FC Supra du Québec in the Canadian Premier League.

== Career statistics ==
As of October 27, 2025

| Club | Season | League | | | Playoffs | | National Cup | | League Cup | | Total | |
| Club | Season | Division | Apps | Goals | Apps | Goals | Apps | Goals | Apps | Goals | Apps | Goals |
|---|---|---|---|---|---|---|---|---|---|---|---|---|
| West Texas FC | 2024 | National Premier Soccer League | 10 | 7 | 2 | 1 | — | | — | | 12 | 8 |
| CS St-Laurent | 2025 | Ligue1 Québec | 17 | 8 | — | | — | | 3 | 1 | 20 | 9 |
| Career total | | | 27 | 15 | 2 | 1 | 0 | 0 | 3 | 1 | 32 | 17 |
