= Alexandre Marcoux =

Canadian soccer player (born 2004)

Personal information
- Date of birth: May 18, 2004 (age 22)
- Place of birth: Plessisville, Québec, Canada
- Height: 6 ft 0 in (1.83 m)
- Position: Forward

Team information
- Current team: FC Supra du Québec
- Number: 18

Youth career
- Optimum de Victoriaville
- 2020: AS Brossard
- 2021: CS Monteuil

College career
Years	Team	Apps	(Gls)
2024	Simon Fraser Red Leafs	18	(1)
2025–	UQTR Patriotes	10	(7)

Senior career*
Years	Team	Apps	(Gls)
2022–2024	AS Blainville		
2025	CS St-Laurent	15	(4)
2026–	FC Supra du Québec	5	(1)
- * Club domestic league appearances and goals as of August 17, 2026

Alexandre Marcoux (born May 18, 2004) is a Canadian soccer player who plays for FC Supra du Québec in the Canadian Premier League.

== Early life ==
Marcoux played youth soccer with Optimum de Victoriaville, later joining AS Brossard and CS Monteuil. In 2022, he played with Quebec at the 2022 Canada Summer Games winning gold.

== University career ==
In 2024, Marcoux began attending Simon Fraser University, where he played for the men's soccer team.

In 2025, he moved to the Université du Québec à Trois-Rivières, joining the men's soccer team. In 2025, he was named the RSEQ Player of the Year, an RSEQ First-Team All-Star, and a U Sports First Team All-Canadian.

== Club career ==
In 2022, Marcoux joined AS Blainville in the Première ligue de soccer du Québec.

In 2025, Marcoux played with CS St-Laurent in Ligue1 Québec.

At the 2026 CPL-U Sports Draft, Marcoux was selected in the first round (second overall) by FC Supra du Québec. In April 2025, he signed a U Sports contract with the club, enabling him to maintain his university eligibility.On April 12, 2026, he scored the winning goal in a 3-2 victory over Pacific FC, to give Supra its first-ever victory in its inaugural match.
