= Omar El Kalkouli =

Canadian soccer player (born 2004)

Personal information
- Date of birth: May 19, 2004 (age 22)
- Place of birth: Montréal, Québec, Canada
- Height: 6 ft 0 in (1.83 m)
- Position: Midfielder

Team information
- Current team: FC Supra du Québec
- Number: 8

Youth career
- AS Brossard
- CS Mont-Royal Outremont
- CF Montréal
- 2022–2023: Lank Vilaverdense

College career
Years	Team	Apps	(Gls)
2024	Nomades du Collège Montmorency		
2025–	Montreal Carabins		

Senior career*
Years	Team	Apps	(Gls)
2022	CS Mont-Royal Outremont	6	(0)
2025	CS Mont-Royal Outremont	13	(6)
2026–	FC Supra du Québec	11	(0)
- * Club domestic league appearances and goals as of August 17, 2026

Omar El Kalkouli (born May 19, 2004) is a Canadian soccer player who plays for FC Supra du Québec in the Canadian Premier League.

== Early life ==
El Kakouli played youth soccer with AS Brossard, CS Mont-Royal Outremont, and the CF Montreal Academy, also spending a year in Portugal with the Lank Vilaverdense U19 team.

== University career ==
El Kakouli attended Collège Montmorency, playing for the soccer team. In September 2024, he was the RSEQ student-athlete of the week. He was named a First Team All-Star at the end of the season.

In 2025, he began attending the Université de Montréal, where he played for the men's soccer team.

== Club career ==
El Kakouli began his senior career with CS Mont-Royal Outremont in Ligue1 Québec.

In January 2026, he signed with FC Supra du Québec in the Canadian Premier League on a one-year contract with an option for 2027.
