= 2026 CPL–U Sports Draft =

Eighth annual Canadian Premier League sports draft

General information
- Sport: Soccer
- Date: November 28, 2025
- Time: 1:00 PM ET
- Networks: OneSoccer; YouTube

Overview
- 16 total selections in 2 rounds
- League: Canadian Premier League
- Teams: 8
- First selection: Călin Calaidjoglu (FC Supra du Québec)
- Most selections: Vancouver FC (3)

The 2026 CPL–U Sports Draft was the eighth annual CPL–U Sports Draft. Canadian Premier League (CPL) teams selected 16 eligible U Sports soccer players to be invited to their respective preseason camps with the opportunity to earn development contracts for the 2026 Canadian Premier League season.

== Format ==
Players could be selected if they had one to four years of U Sports eligibility remaining, were in good academic standing, were planning to return to school the following year, and completed the CPL's draft declaration form. Players who were selected can sign a full professional contract or a U Sports development contract, which allows them to return to university for the following season, without losing their eligibility.

Players interested in being selected were required to declare for the draft by November 13, 2025. A total of 201 players declared for the draft and were eligible for selection.

Each CPL team was awarded two selections in the draft. Consistent with the 2023 CPL-U Sports Draft, expansion club FC Supra du Québec would receive both the first and second overall selections in the first round (with no second round selection). The remainder of the selections were awarded in reverse order of the previous season's standings, including playoffs and final standings. Valour FC folded following the 2025 season, and were thus not included. In addition, Inter Toronto FC's first round selection (5th overall) was traded to Vancouver FC during the 2025 season, in a transaction involving Gabriel Bitar.

== Broadcasting ==
On November 24, the CPL confirmed the draft order and announced that the draft would be broadcast on OneSoccer and YouTube on November 28, 2025, at 1:00 pm ET.

== Player selection ==
^{*}	Denotes player who has signed a professional contract for the 2026 season
^{^}	Denotes player who has signed a developmental contract for the 2026 season

The following players were selected:

=== Round 1 ===
Pick #	CPL team	Player	Position	Nationality	University	Last team/academy
1	FC Supra du Québec	Călin Calaidjoglu	MF	Moldova (Note: Also holds Canadian citizenship)	Université de Montréal	FC Laval (L1Q)
2	FC Supra du Québec	Alexandre Marcoux	FW	Canada	Université du Québec à Trois-Rivières	CS St-Laurent (L1Q)
3	Vancouver FC	Joseph Green	DF	Canada	Mount Royal University	
4	Pacific FC	Archie Tugwell	DF	Canada	University of Victoria	
5	Vancouver FC (Note: Inter Toronto FC's first round pick (5th overall) went to Vancouver FC as a result of a trade on January 13, 2025 in exchange for Gabriel Bitar.)	Matheus De Souza	GK	Canada	University of the Fraser Valley	Langley United (L1BC) & Vancouver FC (CPL)
6	HFX Wanderers FC	Harvey Hughes	DF	England	Cape Breton University	Calgary Foothills FC (L1A)
7	Cavalry FC	Emmanuel Dan-Adokiene	FW	Canada	Trinity Western University	Calgary Foothills FC (L1A)
8	Forge FC	Noah Bickford	DF	Canada	Toronto Metropolitan University	Simcoe County Rovers FC (L1O)
9	Atlético Ottawa	Gabriel Tardif	MF	Canada	Brock University	Ottawa South United (L1Q)

=== Round 2 ===
Pick #	CPL team	Player	Position	Nationality	University	Last team/academy
10	Vancouver FC	Nicolas Nadeau	DF	Canada	University of British Columbia	Valour FC (CPL)
11	Pacific FC	Luke Norman	MF	Canada	University of British Columbia	Burnaby FC (L1BC)
12	Inter Toronto FC	Michael Williams	GK	Canada	York University	York United FC Academy (L1O) & York United FC (CPL)
13	HFX Wanderers FC	Kautchy Andji-Yapi	FW	Canada	Université de Moncton	
14	Cavalry FC	Luc Ihama	DF	Canada	Toronto Metropolitan University	Simcoe County Rovers FC (L1O)
15	Forge FC	Maxime Bourgeois	MF	Canada	Université de Sherbrooke	Celtix du Haut-Richelieu (L1Q)
16	Atlético Ottawa	Joseph Daher	MF	Canada	Carleton University	

== Selection statistics ==
=== Draftees by nationality ===
Rank	Country	Selections
1	Canada	14
2	England	1
2	Moldova	1
