= Rocco Placentino =

Canadian soccer player

Personal information
- Date of birth: 25 February 1982 (age 44)
- Place of birth: Montreal, Quebec, Canada
- Height: 1.74 m (5 ft 8 1/2 in)
- Position: Midfielder

Senior career*
Years	Team	Apps	(Gls)
1999–2000	Foggia		
2002–2003	Montreal Impact	30	(2)
2003	Avellino	1	(0)
2003–2004	Teramo	10	(0)
2004–2005	Cavese	30	(7)
2005–2006	Gualdo	28	(10)
2006–2007	Massese	18	(3)
2007–2008	Gubbio	24	(7)
2008–2010	Montreal Impact	65	(7)
2010–2011	Perugia	15	(2)
2012–2013	FC Saint-Léonard	21	(9)
2014	ACP Montréal-Nord	4	(1)
Total		246	(48)

International career
2002	Canada U20	1	(0)
2002–2004	Canada U23	7	(2)
2005	Canada	1	(0)
- * Club domestic league appearances and goals

Rocco Placentino (born 25 February 1982) is a Canadian former soccer player. He currently serves as the President of Canadian Premier League club FC Supra du Québec.

== Club career ==
Placentino began his senior career with Italian club Foggia, with whom he made two appearances.

He then joined the Montreal Impact in 2002.

In the summer of 2003, Placentino joined Avellino in the Serie B, however, he only made two appearances with the club before departing. He subsequently joined Teramo in Serie C1, during the winter transfer window.

In the summer of 2004 he joined Cavese in Serie C2. He subsequently played with Gualdo, Massese, and Gubbio over the next few years.

In May 2008, Placentino returned to the Montreal Impact in the USL First Division, signing a two-year contract, with an option for an additional season. In November 2009, he signed an extension for an additional two seasons.

In July 2010, he returned to Italy, signing with A.C. Perugia Calcio in the Serie C2, who he would join on August 8, upon the expiry of his contract with the Impact.

He ended his playing career, playing at the semi-professional level back home in Canada in the Première ligue de soccer du Québec with FC Saint-Léonard and ACP Montréal-Nord.

== International career ==
Placentino represented Canada at youth level with the Canada U20 and Canada U23 teams. He was named to the squad for the 2004 CONCACAF Men's Pre-Olympic Tournament.

In August 2005, Placentino was called up to the Canada senior team for the first time, ahead of a friendly against Spain on September 3. He made his debut (and only senior appearance) in the match, which ended in a 2-1 loss.

== Post-playing career ==
After spending 13 years as the Technical Director of CS Saint-Laurent, in September 2025, he was named President of the newly established Canadian Premier League club FC Supra du Québec, a club he co-founded.

== Personal life ==
In 2019, Placentino was named an Ambassador for Physical Literacy with the English Montreal School Board.
