= Nicholas Razzaghi =

Canadian soccer coach

Nick Razzaghi
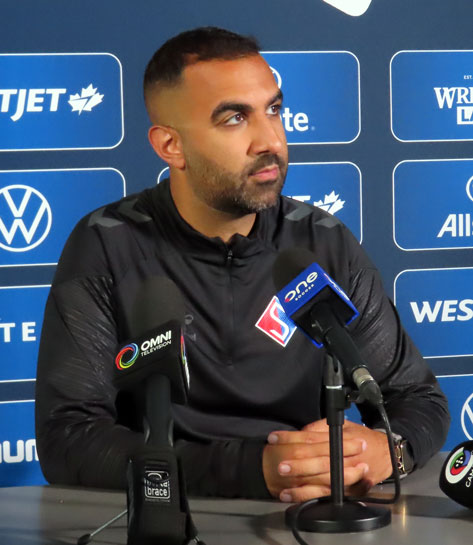
- Razzaghi in 2026

Personal information
- Full name: Nicholas Razzaghi
- Date of birth: January 10, 1992 (age 34)
- Place of birth: Montreal, Quebec, Canada

Managerial career
- Years: Team
- 2016–2018: Vanier College (assistant)
- 2019–2021: Vanier College (women)
- 2022–2024: Vanier College
- 2022–2025: CS St-Laurent
- 2025–2026: FC Supra du Québec

Nicholas Razzaghi (born January 10, 1992) is a Canadian soccer coach.

== Coaching career ==
Razzaghi began coaching at age 17, with various youth and futsal clubs in Quebec.

In 2016, he became the assistant coach of the men's soccer team at Vanier College until 2018. In 2019, he became the head coach of the women's team, before becoming the men's head coach in 2022. In 2024, he was named the RSEQ Coach of the Year.

In November 2021, he was revealed as the head coach of CS St-Laurent, ahead of their first season in Ligue1 Québec in 2022. With St-Laurent, he won the league and cup double in 2023, also earning Coach of the Year honours, and participated in the 2024 Canadian Championship, which included a victory over Canadian Premier League club HFX Wanderers FC and a match-up with Toronto FC of Major League Soccer. They repeated as league cup champions in 2024, before winning their second league title in 2025. He was also named the Coach of the Year in 2025.

In October 2025, he was named the first-ever head coach for expansion club FC Supra du Québec, who are scheduled to begin play in the Canadian Premier League in 2026.
