= Safwane Mlah =

Canadian soccer player (born 2001)

Personal information
- Date of birth: December 8, 2001 (age 24)
- Place of birth: New Jersey, United States
- Height: 1.75 m (5 ft 9 in)
- Position: Forward

Team information
- Current team: FC Supra du Québec
- Number: 24

Youth career
- –2018: FS Salaberry
- 2019: CS St-Hubert

College career
Years	Team	Apps	(Gls)
- Aigles du Collège Ahuntsic

Senior career*
Years	Team	Apps	(Gls)
2020–2021	CS St-Hubert	18	(6)
2022	AS Blainville	22	(3)
2023–2024	CS St-Laurent	24	(10)
2024–2025	Valour FC	37	(1)
2026–	FC Supra du Québec	14	(4)

International career^{‡}
2021–	Canada (futsal)	6	(4)
- * Club domestic league appearances and goals as of August 17, 2026 ‡ National team caps and goals as of April 17, 2024

Safwane Mlah (born December 8, 2001) is a soccer player who plays for FC Supra du Québec in the Canadian Premier League. Born in the United States, he represents Canada at international level in futsal.

== Early life ==
Mlah played youth soccer with FS Salaberry. He later attended Collège Ahuntsic, where he played for the men's soccer team.

He has also regularly played futsal, into his adulthood.

== Club career ==
In 2020, he began playing at the senior level with CS St-Hubert in the Première ligue de soccer du Québec. In 2022, he played with AS Blainville and was named to the PLSQ All-Star team for a pre-season match against Major League Soccer club CF Montréal in January 2022. In 2023, he helped CS St-Laurent win the 2023 title. He was also named the Ballon D'or winner as the league's best player. In January 2024, he went on trial with Swedish Superettan club Trelleborgs FF. He then continued playing with CS St-Laurent for the 2024 season.

In June 2024, he signed with Valour FC of the Canadian Premier League. He made his debut on July 18, in a substitute appearance, against the HFX Wanderers. On July 21, 2024, he scored his first professional goal, in his first professional start, against Atlético Ottawa.

In March 2026, he signed with FC Supra du Québec in the Canadian Premier League for the 2026 season, with an option for 2027.

== International career ==
Mlah began playing with the Canada national futsal team in 2021, where he was named to the roster for the 2021 CONCACAF Futsal Championship. He scored his first international futsal goal for Canada on May 4, 2021 at the CONCACAF championships. In December 2023, he was named the Canadian Soccer Association Futsal Player of the Year.

== Career statistics ==
=== Club ===
As of October 27, 2025

Club	Season	League			Playoffs		National Cup		League Cup		Total	
Club	Season	Division	Apps	Goals	Apps	Goals	Apps	Goals	Apps	Goals	Apps	Goals
CS St-Hubert	2020	Première ligue de soccer du Québec	7	2	—		—		—		7	2
CS St-Hubert	2021	Première ligue de soccer du Québec	11	4	—		—		—		11	4
CS St-Hubert	Total		18	6	0	0	0	0	0	0	18	6
AS Blainville	2022	Première ligue de soccer du Québec	22	3	—		—		2	0	24	3
CS St-Laurent	2023	Ligue1 Québec	19	8	—		—		3	4	22	12
CS St-Laurent	2024	Ligue1 Québec	5	2	—		3	0	0	0	8	2
CS St-Laurent	Total		24	10	0	0	3	0	3	4	30	14
Valour FC	2024	Canadian Premier League	14	1	—		0	0	—		14	1
Valour FC	2025	Canadian Premier League	23	0	—		2	0	—		25	0
Valour FC	Total		37	1	0	0	2	0	0	0	39	1
Career total			101	20	0	0	5	0	5	4	111	24

=== International ===
As of match played December 17, 2024

Appearances and goals by national team and year
National team	Year	Apps	Goals
Canada Futsal	2021	1	1
Canada Futsal	2024	5	3
Total		6	4

== Honours ==
Individual

- Ligue1 Québec Ballon D'or: 2023
- Canada Soccer Futsal Player of the Year: 2023
