= Sean Rea =

Canadian soccer player (born 2002)

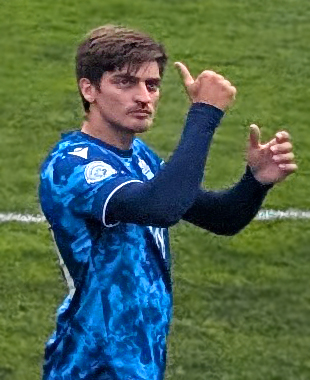
- Rea in 2025 with HFX Wanderers FC

Personal information
- Date of birth: May 15, 2002 (age 24)
- Place of birth: Montreal, Quebec, Canada
- Height: 1.70 m (5 ft 7 in)
- Position: Forward

Team information
- Current team: FC Supra du Québec
- Number: 10

Youth career
- 2006–2013: FC Saint-Léonard
- 2014–2020: Montreal Impact

Senior career*
Years	Team	Apps	(Gls)
2020–2023	CF Montréal	15	(0)
2021–2022	→ Valour FC (loan)	50	(6)
2023	→ CF Montréal U23 (loan)	1	(0)
2024	Castellón B	4	(0)
2024–2025	HFX Wanderers	42	(3)
2026–	FC Supra du Québec	15	(4)

International career^{‡}
2017	Canada U15	4	(1)
2019	Canada U17	2	(0)
- * Club domestic league appearances and goals as of August 17, 2026 ‡ National team caps and goals as of June 27, 2021

Sean Rea (born May 15, 2002) is a Canadian professional soccer player who plays for FC Supra du Québec in the Canadian Premier League.

== Early life ==
Rea began playing soccer at age four with Saint-Léonard. In 2014, he joined the Montreal Impact Academy. In January 2020, he traveled to Italy to train with Pescara, and Germany where he spent almost two weeks with Schalke.

== Club career ==
=== CF Montréal ===
In December 2020, he signed his first professional contract with the Montreal Impact (later re-named CF Montreal) of Major League Soccer. He served as an unused substitute in their CONCACAF Champions League match against C.D. Olimpia on December 15, 2020.

==== Loans to Valour FC ====
In April 2021, he went on loan with Valour FC of the Canadian Premier League, after turning down an opportunity to join an Italian Serie C club on loan. On June 27, 2021, Rea made his professional debut for Valour as a starter in the opening match of the season against Forge FC. He scored his first professional goal on August 21, 2021 in a Canadian Championship match against Atlético Ottawa. After the 2021 season, CF Montreal picked up his club option for 2022.

In March 2022, he returned to Valour FC on a new loan. He was named the CPL Player of the Month for August 2022 and was named to the CPL Team of the Week six times, over the course of the season. In his second season with the club, he led the team in minutes played, doubling his amount from the previous season, and set a CPL record with 9 assists. He also led the league in chances created (71) and in completed crosses and corners (62). After the season, he was named the 2022 CPL U21 Player of the Year and was nominated for the league Player of the Year and the Players' Player Award.

==== Return from loan ====
Rea made his competitive debut for Montreal in their 2023 season-opener against Inter Miami on February 25, entering as a substitute in an eventual 2-0 defeat. He scored his first goal for Montreal on April 18, 2023, in a 2-0 victory over Vaughan Azzurri in the first round of the 2023 Canadian Championship. Upon completion of the 2023 Season, CF Montréal would announce that they would not pick up Rea's contract for 2024, ending his time with the club.

=== Castellón B ===
Ahead of the 2024 season, he went on trial with the Portland Timbers. In March 2024, he began training with Spanish club CD Castellón of the Primera Federación, arranging a pre-contract coniditonal upon the club's promotion to the second tier for the next season. He then signed with the second team CD Castellón B in the Tercera Federación for the remainder of the season. He made his debut for the second team on March 8 against CF Gandía. However, the club did not adhere to the terms of the original pre-contract to join the first team for the 2024-25 season, so he chose to depart the club.

=== Canadian Premier League ===
On July 31, 2024, Rea returned to the Canadian Premier League, signing a contract through 2025 with HFX Wanderers. There were reports he had a deal in principle with fellow CPL club Atlético Ottawa, however, salary cap constraints prevented the deal from being finalized. He made his debut on August 5 against Vancouver FC. On September 14, 2024, he scored his first goal in a 3-0 victory over Forge FC.

In December 2025, he signed with expansion club FC Supra du Québec, as one of the team's three inaugural signings, ahead of their debut season in 2026.

== International career ==
At international level, Rea is eligible to represent both the Canadian and Italian national teams.

In November 2016, he debuted in the Canadian national program, attending a national U14 camp. In 2017, he was named to the Canada U15 team for the 2017 CONCACAF Boys' Under-15 Championship. He scored his first international goal on August 14 against Costa Rica U15. In 2017, Rea was named to the Canada U17 team for the 2019 FIFA U-17 World Cup.

In May 2023, Rea was listed on the Canada preliminary rosters for the 2023 CONCACAF Nations League Finals.

== Personal life ==
Rea has Italian heritage and is a fan of Serie A club Napoli.

He holds an Italian passport through his grandfather, who emigrated from Italy to Canada.

== Career statistics ==
As of match played October 27, 2025

Club	Season	League			Playoffs		Domestic Cup		Continental		Total		
Club	Season	Division	Apps	Goals	Apps	Goals	Apps	Goals	Apps	Goals	Apps	Goals	
CF Montréal	2023	Major League Soccer	15	0	0	0	3	1	0	0	18	1	
Valour FC (loan)	2021	Canadian Premier League	23	1	–		2	1	–		25	2	
Valour FC (loan)	2022	Canadian Premier League	27	5	–		1	0	–		28	5	
Valour FC (loan)	Total		50	6	0	0	3	1	0	0	53	7	
CF Montréal U23 (loan)	2023	Ligue1 Québec	1	0	—		—		—		1	0	
CD Castellón B	2023–24	Tercera Federación	4	0	—		—		—		4	0	
HFX Wanderers	2024	Canadian Premier League	14	1	—		0	0	—		14	1	
HFX Wanderers	2024	Canadian Premier League	Canadian Premier League	28	2	1	0	1	0	—		30	2
HFX Wanderers	Total		Canadian Premier League	42	3	1	0	1	0	0	0	44	2
Career total			112	9	1	0	7	2	0	0	120	11	

== Honours ==
Individual

- Canadian Premier League Best Under 21 Canadian Player of the Year: 2022
