= Keesean Ferdinand =

Canadian soccer player (born 2003)

Personal information
- Full name: Keesean Ferdinand
- Date of birth: 17 August 2003 (age 23)
- Place of birth: Montreal, Quebec, Canada
- Height: 1.85 m (6 ft 1 in)
- Position: Defender

Team information
- Current team: FC Supra du Québec
- Number: 5

Youth career
- 2007–2013: CS Rivière-des-Prairies
- 2014–2020: Montreal Impact

Senior career*
Years	Team	Apps	(Gls)
2020–2022	CF Montréal (Note: Montreal Impact changed its name to CF Montréal in 2021)	0	(0)
2021	→ Atlético Ottawa (loan)	17	(0)
2022	→ CF Montreal U23 (loan)	17	(4)
2023–2024	Portland Timbers 2	55	(1)
2025	Columbus Crew 2	12	(1)
2026–	FC Supra du Québec	20	(1)

International career^{‡}
2019	Canada U17	5	(0)
2022	Canada U20	4	(0)
- * Club domestic league appearances and goals as of October 24, 2026 ‡ National team caps and goals as of 26 June 2022

Keesean Ferdinand (born 17 August 2003) is a Canadian professional soccer player who plays as a defender for Canadian Premier League side FC Supra du Québec.

== Early life ==
Ferdinand began playing youth soccer in 2007, at age four, with CS Rivière-des-Prairies, who he played with until 2013. He then played for CS Panellinios. In 2014, he joined the Montreal Impact Academy, initially starting in the pre-academy program.

== Club career ==
On 17 June 2020, he became the youngest player to sign professionally with the Montreal Impact, at the age of 16, as well as the first player to progress through Montreal's pre-academy system to sign with the first team, signing a two-year contract with a club option for 2022. He first appeared on a match-day squad with Montreal in a CONCACAF Champions League match against Honduran club CD Olimpia on December 16, 2020, but was an unused substitute.

In February 2021, Ferdinand went on loan to Canadian Premier League side Atlético Ottawa. With Ottawa, he had the opportunity to train with players from the Atlético Madrid academy and play exhibition games against youth teams from La Liga clubs and Spanish fourth division teams, during Ottawa's pre-season. Upon completion of the 2021 MLS season, CF Montréal would announce that they would exercise the option on Ferdinand's contract for 2022. In 2022, he went on loan with the second team, CF Montréal U23, in the Première ligue de soccer du Québec. After the 2022 season, his option was declined and he departed the club.

In March 2023, he signed with Portland Timbers 2 in MLS Next Pro. He made his debut on March 26 against Whitecaps FC 2. Ferdinand's contract expired following the 2024 season.

In February 2025, Ferdinand joined Columbus Crew 2 in MLS Next Pro.

In January 2026, he signed with FC Supra du Québec in the Canadian Premier League on a two-year contract with an option for 2028.

== International career ==
Ferdinand is eligible to represent Canada and Haiti, where his mother was born.

In March 2019, he debuted in the Canadian youth system, attending a camp with the Canadian U17 team. He was then named to the roster for the 2019 FIFA U-17 World Cup.

In June 2022, Ferdinand was named to the Canadian U20 team for the 2022 CONCACAF U-20 Championship.
