= Eliakim Awonongbadje =

Canadian soccer player

Personal information
- Full name: Eliakim Mathieu Awonongbadje
- Date of birth: July 11, 2008 (age 18)
- Place of birth: Lomé, Togo
- Position: Defender

Team information
- Current team: FC Supra du Québec

Youth career
- CS Lanaudière-Nord
- CS St-Laurent

Senior career*
Years	Team	Apps	(Gls)
2024–2025	CS St-Laurent	10+	(1+)
2026–	FC Supra du Québec	4	(0)
2026	→ CS St-Laurent (loan)	7	(0)
- * Club domestic league appearances and goals as of September 30, 2026

Eliakim Mathieu Awonongbadje (born November 7, 2008) is a Togolese footballer who plays for FC Supra du Québec in the Canadian Premier League.

== Early life ==
Awonongbadje played youth soccer with CS St-Laurent. He once trialled with Olympique Lyonnais in France and won gold with Team Quebec at the 2025 Canada Summer Games. In May 2025, he participated in the Canadian Premier League U19 Showcase.

== Club career ==
In 2024, Awonongbadje began playing with CS St-Laurent in Ligue1 Québec. He became the youngest goalscorer in league history in 2024.

In March 2026, he signed a developmental contract with FC Supra du Québec in the Canadian Premier League. On August 28, 2026, he made his professional debut, in a match against Forge FC. In September 2026, he upgraded his contract to a fully professional Exceptional Young Talent contract, through the 2028 season, with club options for 2029 and 2030.
