= Sasha Deslandes =

Canadian soccer player

Personal information
- Date of birth: June 11, 2006 (age 20)
- Place of birth: Montreal, Québec, Canada
- Position: Defender

Team information
- Current team: FC Supra du Québec
- Number: 37

Youth career
- CS Mont-Royal Outremont

College career
Years	Team	Apps	(Gls)
2025	Montreal Carabins		

Senior career*
Years	Team	Apps	(Gls)
2025–2026	CS St-Laurent	15	(0)
2026–	FC Supra du Québec	6	(0)
- * Club domestic league appearances and goals as of September 30, 2026

Sasha Deslandes (born June 11, 2006) is a Canadian soccer player who plays for FC Supra du Québec in the Canadian Premier League.

== Early life ==
Deslandes played youth soccer with CS Mont-Royal Outremont.

== University career ==
Deslandes played with the Montreal Carabins.

== Club career ==
Deslandes began his senior career with CS St-Laurent in Ligue1 Québec.

In May 2026, he signed with FC Supra du Québec in the Canadian Premier League. On May 13, 2026, he made his professional debut, starting and playing all 90 minutes against Forge FC.
