= Wesley Wandje =

Cameroonian footballer (born 2000)

Personal information
- Full name: Yves Wesley Wandje Djomze
- Date of birth: May 7, 2000 (age 26)
- Place of birth: Douala, Cameroon
- Height: 1.73 m (5 ft 8 in)
- Position: Forward

Team information
- Current team: FC Supra du Québec
- Number: 64

Youth career
- 2015–2018: CS St-Laurent

College career
Years	Team	Apps	(Gls)
2024–2025	Montreal Carabins		

Senior career*
Years	Team	Apps	(Gls)
2019–2021	CS St-Hubert	30	(10)
2022	FC Podillya Khmelnytskyi	0	(0)
2022–2024	CS St-Laurent	59	(14)
2025	Valour FC	2	(0)
2026–	FC Supra du Québec	7	(0)
- * Club domestic league appearances and goals as of August 17, 2026

Yves Wesley Wandje Djomze (born May 7, 2000) is a Cameroonian footballer who plays for FC Supra du Québec in the Canadian Premier League.

== Early life ==
Wandje was born in Douala, Cameroon, before moving to Sainte-Marthe-sur-le-lac, Quebec in Canada in 2014.

== University career ==
In 2024, Wandje began attending the Université de Montréal, where he played for the men's soccer team. On October 13, 2024, he scored his first goal in a 2-2 draw with the Laval Rouge et Or. At the end of the 2024 season, he was named an RSEQ First Team All-Star and a U Sports Second Team All-Star.

== Club career ==
From 2019 to 2021, Wandje played with CS St-Hubert in the Première ligue de soccer du Québec.

In February 2022, he signed with FC Podillya Khmelnytskyi in the Ukrainian second tier, however, he did not play for the side, having to return to Canada due to the Russian invasion of Ukraine.

After returning from Ukraine, he joined CS St-Laurent, where he was named team captain. He continued to serve as team captain, through the 2024 season, leading the club to a 2023 league title and an appearance in the 2024 Canadian Championship.

In April 2025, he signed a U Sports contract with Valour FC of the Canadian Premier League. In August 2025, he departed the club in order to return to university.

In January 2026, he signed with FC Supra du Québec in the Canadian Premier League.

== Career statistics ==
As of October 25, 2025

Club	Season	League			Playoffs		National Cup		League Cup		Total	
Club	Season	Division	Apps	Goals	Apps	Goals	Apps	Goals	Apps	Goals	Apps	Goals
CS St-Hubert	2019	Première ligue de soccer du Québec	8	2	—		—		3	2	11	4
CS St-Hubert	2020	Première ligue de soccer du Québec	7	1	—		—		—		7	1
CS St-Hubert	2021	Première ligue de soccer du Québec	15	7	—		—		—		15	7
CS St-Hubert	Total		30	10	0	0	0	0	3	2	33	12
CS St-Laurent	2022	Première ligue de soccer du Québec	21	7	—		—		0	0	21	7
CS St-Laurent	2023	Ligue1 Québec	21	5	—		—		3	2	24	7
CS St-Laurent	2024	Ligue1 Québec	17	2	—		3	0	2	2	22	4
CS St-Laurent	Total		59	14	0	0	3	0	5	4	67	18
Valour FC	2025	Canadian Premier League	2	0	—		1	0	—		3	0
Career total			91	24	0	0	4	0	8	6	103	30
