= Joakim Milli =

Canadian soccer player (born 2000)

Personal information
- Date of birth: April 27, 2000 (age 26)
- Place of birth: Montreal, Quebec, Canada
- Height: 1.87 m (6 ft 1 1/2 in)
- Position: Goalkeeper

Team information
- Current team: FC Supra du Québec
- Number: 32

Youth career
- –2012: AS Rosemont Petite Patrie
- 2013: Panellinios St Michel FC
- 2014–2016: CS Repentigny
- 2016–2017: Bari
- 2017–2018: Casarano
- 2018–2019: Lecce

College career
Years	Team	Apps	(Gls)
2024–2025	Montreal Carabins	18	(0)

Senior career*
Years	Team	Apps	(Gls)
2018–2020	Lecce	0	(0)
2019–2020	→ Monopoli (loan)	0	(0)
2020	Nardò	6	(0)
2020–2021	Lecce	0	(0)
2020–2021	→ Nardò (loan)	31	(0)
2021–2023	Virtus Francavilla	2	(0)
2025	CS St-Laurent	16	(0)
2026–	FC Supra du Québec	7	(0)
- * Club domestic league appearances and goals as of June 29, 2026

Joakim Milli (born April 27, 2000) is a Canadian soccer player who plays for Canadian Premier League club FC Supra du Québec.

== Early life ==
Milli played youth soccer with AS Rosemont Petite Patrie, Panellinios St Michel FC, and CS Repentigny. He later moved to Italy and joined the youth system of Bari, later joining Casarano.

== University career ==
In 2024, Milli began attending the Université de Montréal, where he played for the men's soccer team. In 2024, he was named an RSEQ First Team All-Star and a U Sports First Team All-Canadian.

== Club career ==
In July 2018, Milli signed with Lecce in Serie B, serving as the third goalkeeper. In August 2019, following the club's promotion to Serie A, he signed his first professional contract — a four-year extension — with the club.

In September 2019, he was loaned to Monopoli in Serie C. In mid-January 2020, he returned to Lecce from his loan, after it was terminated early without having made any appearances. Upon returning to Lecce, his contract with Lecce was terminated by mutual consent.

On January 18, 2020, he signed with Serie D side Nardò.

In September 2020, he returned to Lecce. In October 2020, he returned to Nardò on loan. He finished the season with the most clean sheets in Group H of Serie D.

In June 2021, he signed with Virtus Francavilla in Serie C on a two-year contract through June 2023.

In 2025, he played with CS St-Laurent in Ligue1 Québec. He won the league's Golden Glove as the Top Goalkeeper.

In December 2025, he signed with Canadian Premier League club FC Supra du Québec.

== Career statistics ==
As of 27 October 2025

Appearances and goals by club, season and competition
Club	Season	League			National cup		League cup		Total	
Club	Season	Division	Apps	Goals	Apps	Goals	Apps	Goals	Apps	Goals
Lecce	2018–19	Serie B	0	0	0	0	—		0	0
Lecce	2019–20	Serie A	0	0	0	0	—		0	0
Lecce	Total		0	0	0	0	0	0	0	0
Monopoli (loan)	2019–20	Serie C	0	0	0	0	0	0	0	0
Nardò	2019–20	Serie D	6	0	—		0	0	6	0
Lecce	2020–21	Serie B	0	0	0	0	—		0	0
Nardò (loan)	2019–21	Serie D	31	0	—		—		31	0
Virtus Francavilla	2021–22	Serie C	1	0	—		1	0	2	0
Virtus Francavilla	2022–23	Serie C	1	0	—		0	0	1	0
Virtus Francavilla	Total		2	0	0	0	1	0	3	0
CS St-Laurent	2025	Ligue1 Québec	16	0	—		0	0	16	0
Career total			55	0	0	0	1	0	56	0
