= Noah dos Santos =

Canadian soccer player (born 2008)

Personal information
- Full name: Noah Lauren Trudel dos Santos
- Date of birth: February 12, 2002 (age 24)
- Place of birth: Montréal, Québec, Canada
- Height: 1.87 m (6 ft 1 1/2 in)
- Position: Forward

Team information
- Current team: FC Supra du Québec
- Number: 92

Youth career
- AS St-Léonard
- FC Anjou
- Panellinios St Michel FC
- Pierrefonds FC
- CS Étoiles de L'Est

Senior career*
Years	Team	Apps	(Gls)
2021–2022	Varzim B	21	(0)
2022–2023	Cerveira	29	(9)
2024–2025	Rio Ave	0	(0)
2024–2025	→ Académica de Coimbra (loan)	14	(2)
2025	→ Leça (loan)	10	(2)
2025–2026	Leça	21	(2)
2026–	FC Supra du Québec	9	(2)
- * Club domestic league appearances and goals as of October 14, 2026

Noah Lauren Trudel dos Santos (born February 12, 2002) is a Canadian soccer player who plays for Canadian Premier League club FC Supra du Québec.

== Early life ==
Dos Santos played youth soccer with AS St-Léonard, FC Anjou, Panellinios St Michel FC, and CS Étoiles de L'Est. He is a dual Canadian and Portuguese citizen.

== Club career ==
In 2021, dos Santos went to Portugal, joining Varzim B.

In 2022, he joined Cerveira.

In January 2024, dos Santos signed with Rio Ave, joining their U23 team. In March 2024, he signed a first-team contract, with options through 2027. In July 2024, he was loaned to Académica de Coimbra in the third tier Liga 3. In January 2025, he was recalled from his loan and subsequently loaned to Leça in the fourth tier Campeonato de Portugal through June 2025, which would be when his contract with Rio Ave would expire.

After the end of his loan, he signed a permanent contract with Leça. In May 2026, he scored the winning goal in stoppage time in a 4-3 victory over Vianense to secure promotion to Liga 3.

In August 2026, dos Santos signed with Canadian Premier League club FC Supra du Québec for the remainder of the 2026 season, with options for 2027 and 2028. As part of the transfer, Leça would retain a 50% sell-on clause in a future transfer. On October 4, 2026, he scored his first goal for the club, in a 5-0 victory over Pacific FC.

== Career statistics ==
As of September 16, 2026

Club	Season	League			Domestic Cup		Other		Total	
Club	Season	Division	Apps	Goals	Apps	Goals	Apps	Goals	Apps	Goals
Varzim B	2021–22	AF Porto Elite	21	0	—		—		21	0
Cerveira	2022–23	AF Viana do Castelo 1ª Divisão	29	9	—		1 (Note: Appearances in the AF Viana do Castelo Taça)	1	30	10
Rio Ave	2023–24	Primeira Liga	0	0	0	0	0	0	0	0
Académica de Coimbra (loan)	2023–24	Liga 3	14	2	2	1	—		16	3
Leça (loan)	2024–25	Campeonato de Portugal	10	2	0	0	5 (Note: Appearances in the Campeonato de Portugal promotion playoffs)	0	15	2
Leça	2025–26	Campeonato de Portugal	21	2	1	0	6 (Note: 5 appearances and one goal in the Campeonato de Portugal promotion playoffs; 1 appearance in the Campeonato de Portugal championship final)	1	26	0
Leça	Total		31	4	1	0	11	1	43	5
FC Supra du Québec	2026	Canadian Premier League	3	0	2	0	—		5	0
Career total			79	15	3	0	11	1	93	16
