= David Choinière =

Canadian soccer player (born 1997)

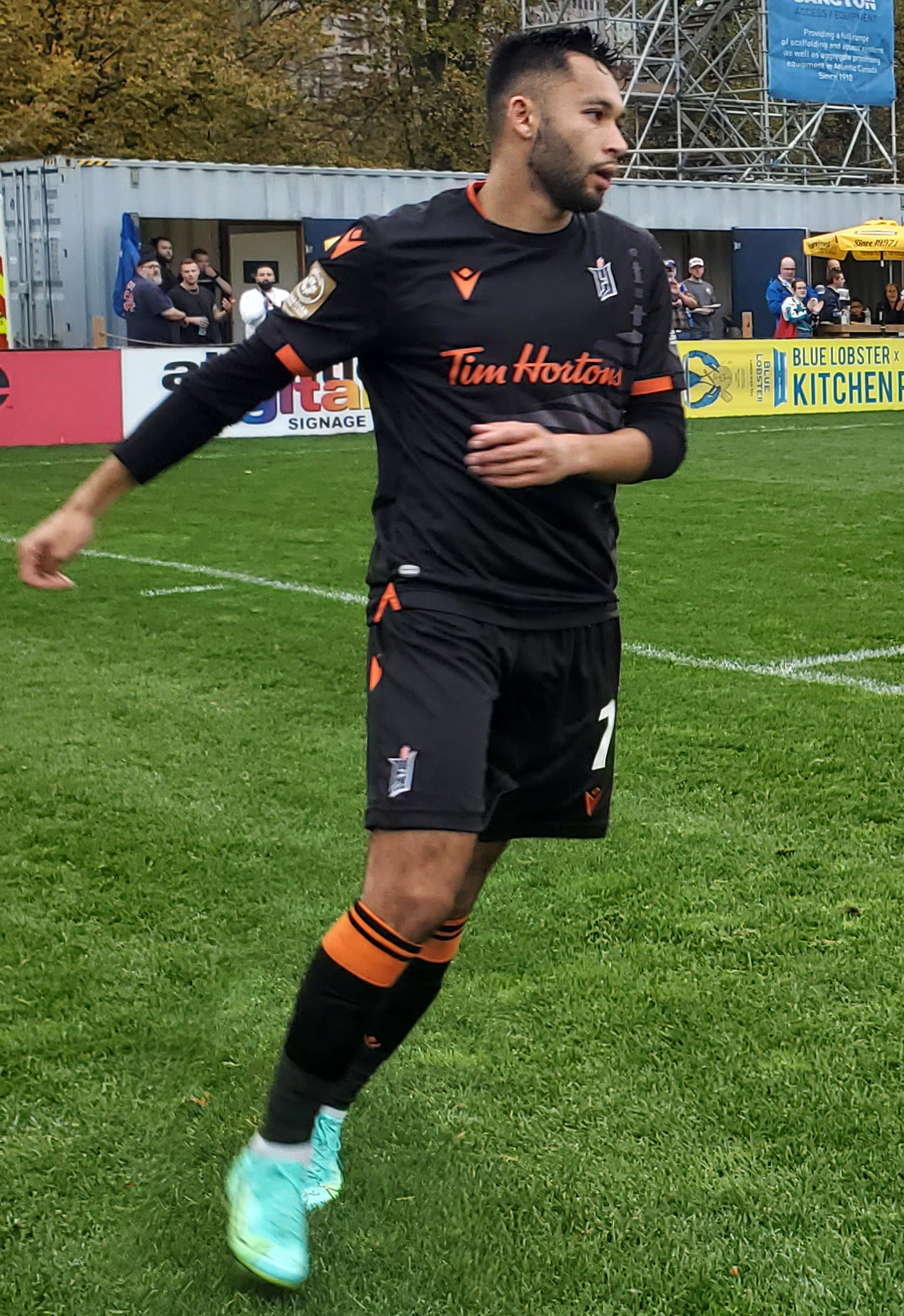
- Choinière with Forge FC in 2021

Personal information
- Date of birth: February 7, 1997 (age 29)
- Place of birth: Saint-Jean-sur-Richelieu, Quebec, Canada
- Height: 1.73 m (5 ft 8 in)
- Position: Midfielder

Team information
- Current team: FC Supra du Québec
- Number: 7

Youth career
- Celtix du Haut-Richelieu
- 2011–2016: Montreal Impact

Senior career*
Years	Team	Apps	(Gls)
2016	FC Montreal	15	(1)
2016–2018	Montreal Impact	5	(0)
2019–2025	Forge FC	137	(19)
2026–	FC Supra du Québec	23	(0)

International career^{‡}
2012	Canada U15		
2014	Canada U18		
- * Club domestic league appearances and goals as of November 9, 2026 ‡ National team caps and goals as of April 2, 2018

David Choinière (born February 7, 1997) is a Canadian soccer player who plays for FC Supra du Québec in the Canadian Premier League.

== Early life ==
Choinière began playing soccer at age five with Celtix du Haut-Richelieu. In 2011, he joined the Montreal Impact Academy. In 2016, he won the Federation de Soccer du Quebec (FSQ) Male Senior Player of Excellence award.

== Club career ==
In January 2016, Choinière joined FC Montreal, the second team of the Montreal Impact, in the USL. He made his professional debut on April 10, 2016, in a 2–1 defeat to Toronto FC II. A month later, he scored his professional goal against Bethlehem Steel FC on May 15.

On June 8, 2016, he made his debut for the Montreal Impact in a 2016 Canadian Championship match against Toronto FC. On June 28, 2016, he officially signed a professional contract with the Impact. He became the first player to sign a first team contract, after having played for the second team. In October 2016, Choinière made his MLS debut against the New England Revolution. In January 2017, he suffered an ankle injury, which caused him to miss the beginning of the season, returning in April. He scored his first goal for the Impact on May 30, 2017, in a Canadian Championship semi-final match. After making one appearance in the 2018 season, he would miss 6 months after having surgery on his ankle in April 2018, after having only played three game the previous season due to the same injury. After the 2018 season, Choinière declined a one-year contract extension and departed the club.

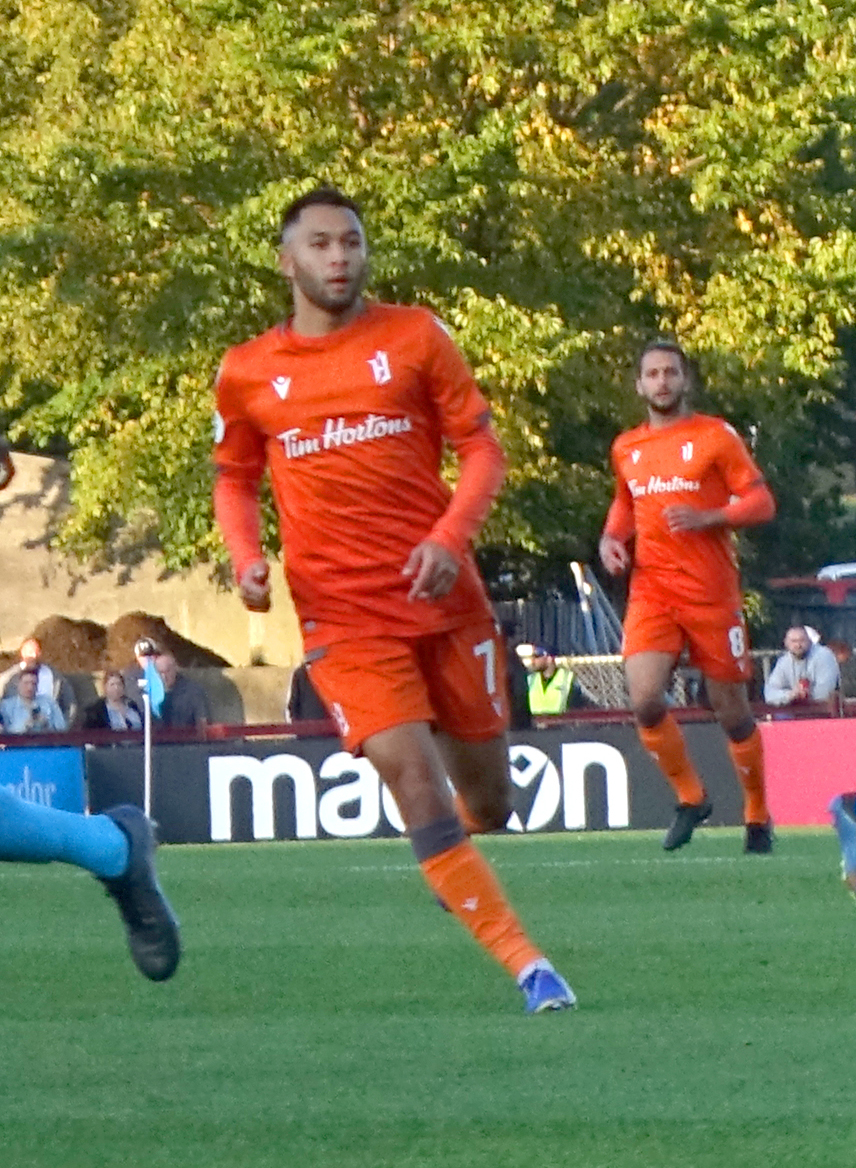
David Choinière in 2019 with Forge FC

In March 2019, he joined Forge FC in the Canadian Premier League. Choinière scored his first goal for Forge on August 1, 2019, a late winner to make the score 2–1 at home in the preliminary round of the 2019 CONCACAF League against Guatemalan club Antigua GFC, which made Forge the first CPL club to ever win a match in a CONCACAF competition. He helped Forge win the CPL title in 2019, scoring the only goal in the second leg on November 2, 2019, against Cavalry FC. In February 2021, he signed an extension with the club. He was named CPL Player of the Month for October 2022. In 2022, he won his third CPL title with the club, scoring the second goal in a 2–0 victory in the championship match. In January 2023, Choinière signed a new multi-year deal to remain with Forge. In October of the same year, he helped Forge win their fourth league title, following a 2–1 win over Cavalry FC in the play-off final. After the 2025 season, he departed the club, following a seven-year stint.

In December 2025, he signed with expansion club FC Supra du Québec, as one of the team's three inaugural signings, ahead of their debut season in 2026.

== International career ==
He made his debut in the Canadian youth program in 2012 with the Canada U15 team at the Copa de México de Naciones.

In 2014, he played for the Canada U18 team at the 2014 Tournoi de Limoges. From 2015 until 2017 he attended several Canada U20 preparation camps, but ultimately missed the 2017 CONCACAF U-20 Championship due to injury. He was named to the Canada U23 preliminary squad for the 2020 CONCACAF Men's Olympic Qualifying Championship.

In September 2017, Choinière received his first Canadian senior team call-up for a friendly against Jamaica, but did not feature in the match.

== Personal life ==
Choinière's younger brother Mathieu is also a soccer player. They faced each other for the first time in a 2022 Canadian Championship match between Forge and CF Montreal, and subsequently played against each other in the 2023 and 2024 editions as well. He is of Filipino descent through his mother.

== Career statistics ==
As of November 3, 2025

Club	League	Season	League		Playoffs		National Cup		Continental		Total	
Club	League	Season	Apps	Goals	Apps	Goals	Apps	Goals	Apps	Goals	Apps	Goals
FC Montreal	USL	2016	15	1	—		—		—		15	1
Montreal Impact	Major League Soccer	2016	1	0	0	0	1	0	—		2	0
Montreal Impact	Major League Soccer	2017	3	0	—		1	1	—		4	1
Montreal Impact	Major League Soccer	2018	1	0	—		0	0	—		1	0
Montreal Impact	Total		5	0	0	0	2	1	0	0	7	1
Forge FC	Canadian Premier League	2019	16	1	2	1	2	0	3	2	23	4
Forge FC	Canadian Premier League	2020	10	1	1	0	—		4	1	15	2
Forge FC	Canadian Premier League	2021	21	4	2	0	2	1	8	1	33	6
Forge FC	Canadian Premier League	2022	26	4	3	2	3 (Note: Includes appearance in the 2020 Canadian Championship final (played in 2022))	0	2	1	34	7
Forge FC	Canadian Premier League	2023	15	2	2	0	2	0	—		19	2
Forge FC	Canadian Premier League	2024	27	5	3	0	5	2	2	0	37	7
Forge FC	Canadian Premier League	2025	22	2	2	1	4	0	2	0	30	3
Forge FC	Total		137	19	15	4	18	3	21	5	191	31
Career total			157	20	15	4	20	4	21	5	213	33

== Honours ==
Club

Forge FC

- Canadian Premier League: 2019, 2020, 2022, 2023

== Furthur reading ==
- Milton, Steve (March 13, 2019). "David Choinière bets on himself and the CPL's Forge FC". The Hamilton Spectator. Archived from the original on September 11, 2023.
- Parisis, Quentin (August 16, 2023). "Une année pleine de défis pour David Choinière et le Forge FC" [A year full of challenges for David Choinière and Forge FC]. Canadian Premier League (in French). Archived from the original on September 11, 2023.
