= Loïc Kwemi =

Canadian soccer player (born 1997)

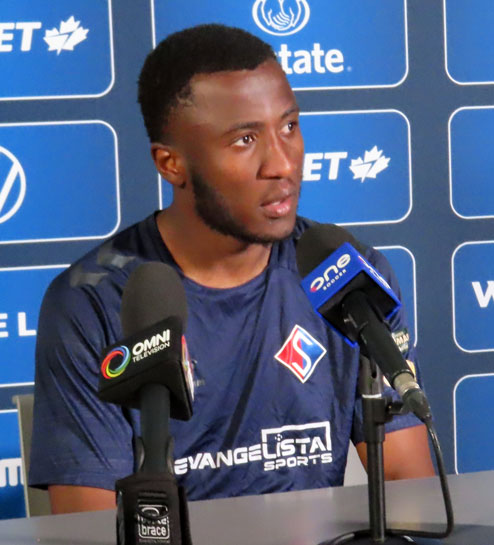
- Kwemi in 2026

Personal information
- Full name: Loïc Adrien Kwemi
- Date of birth: March 2, 1997 (age 29)
- Place of birth: Douala, Cameroon
- Height: 1.83 m (6 ft 0 in)
- Position: Forward

Team information
- Current team: FC Supra du Québec
- Number: 9

Senior career*
Years	Team	Apps	(Gls)
2022–2024	CS St-Laurent	40	(38)
2024	Valour FC	14	(0)
2025	CS LaSalle	19	(23)
2026–	FC Supra du Québec	26	(15)

International career^{‡}
2024–	Canada (futsal)	3	(6)
- * Club domestic league appearances and goals as of October 26, 2026 ‡ National team caps and goals as of April 15, 2024

Loïc Adrien Kwemi (born March 2, 1997) is a soccer player who plays for FC Supra du Québec in the Canadian Premier League. Born in Cameroon, he represents Canada at international level in futsal.

== Early life ==
Kwemi was born in Cameroon. At the age of 11, he moved to Canada, settling in LaSalle, Quebec. As a teenager, he played high school soccer with École secondaire Cavelier-De LaSalle, but did not play with any youth club outside of school. He had two trials with the Montreal Impact Academy in his youth, but was not selected to join either time.

In his early adulthood, he played in lower amateur leagues in Quebec as well as playing futsal. In his early twenties, he had trials with USL Championship clubs San Antonio FC and Reno 1868 FC, being offered a contract with the latter, but declined it due to the club's financial issues, and the uncertainty of whether he would be paid. He later went to France to seek a club, but ultimately returned to Canada, where he was set to go on trial with Canadian Premier League club Cavalry FC in 2018, but suffered an injury prior to the trial and could not participate.

== Club career ==
In 2022, he began playing with CS St-Laurent in the Première ligue de soccer du Québec (later re-named Ligue1 Québec). In 2022 he scored 19 goals, followed by 17 in 2023, helping them win the 2023 league title. He was named the league's Ballon D'or winner in 2022 as the league's best player, also claiming the Golden Boot as Top scorer.

In June 2024, he signed with Valour FC of the Canadian Premier League. He made his debut on July 7 against Cavalry FC.

In February 2025, he signed with his hometown team, CS LaSalle in Ligue2 Québec. He won the Ballon D'or as the Ligue2 top player in 2025.

In December 2025, he signed with Canadian Premier League expansion club FC Supra du Québec, as one of the team's three inaugural signings, ahead of their debut season in 2026. On April 11, 2026, he scored the first goal in club history, in a 3-2 victory over Pacific FC, in the club's inaugural match. He won the league's Golden Boot, as top scorer, in 2026 with 15 goals in the regular season.

== International career ==
Kwemi was called up to the Canada national futsal team for a camp for the first time in December 2022. He was named the 2022 Canadian Futsal Male Futsal Player Of The Year by Futsal Canada . He was named to the squad for the 2024 CONCACAF Futsal Championship. He had been the tournament's second-top goalscorer in the group stages with six goals and helped Canada reach the quarter-finals. He was named Canada Soccer's 2024 Futsal Player of the Year.

== Career statistics ==
=== Club ===
As of October 26, 2026

Club	Season	League			Playoffs		National Cup		League Cup		Total	
Club	Season	Division	Apps	Goals	Apps	Goals	Apps	Goals	Apps	Goals	Apps	Goals
CS St-Laurent	2022	Première ligue de soccer du Québec	18	19	—		—		0	0	18	19
CS St-Laurent	2023	Ligue1 Québec	17	17	—		—		3	1	20	18
CS St-Laurent	2024	Ligue1 Québec	5	2	—		3	1	0	0	8	3
CS St-Laurent	Total		40	38	0	0	3	1	3	1	46	40
Valour FC	2024	Canadian Premier League	14	0	—		0	0	—		14	0
CS LaSalle	2025	Ligue2 Québec	19	23	—		—		—		19	23
FC Supra du Québec	2026	Canadian Premier League	26	15	0	0	5	1	—		31	16
Career total			99	76	0	0	6	1	3	1	110	79

=== International ===
As of match played December 17, 2024

Appearances and goals by national team and year
National team	Year	Apps	Goals
Canada (futsal)	2024	3	6
Total		3	6

== Honours ==
Club

- Ligue1 Québec: 2023
- Ligue2 Québec: 2025
- Coupe Ligue1 Québec: 2023

Individual

- Canadian Premier League Golden Boot: 2026
- Ligue1 Québec Golden Boot: 2022
- Ligue1 Québec Ballon d'or: 2022
- Ligue2 Québec Ballon d'or: 2025
- Futsal Canada Player of the Year: 2022
- Canada Soccer Futsal Player of the Year: 2024
