= Richcraft Recreation Complex =

Recreational facility in Kanata, Ottawa, Ontario

Coordinates: 45.34054°N 75.93048°W

Richcraft Recreation Complex is a major recreational facility that is located in the Kanata district of Ottawa, Ontario, Canada.

Groundbreaking on the complex took place back in December 2011; the official grand opening took place in November 2013. The $43.14-million recreation complex has an eight-lane swimming pool, a leisure and therapeutic pool, two full gymnasiums, a fitness and cardio centre, multi-purpose rooms, a lighted sports field with artificial turf and an outdoor skate park. The complex owned by the City of Ottawa is located at 4101 Innovation Drive, in the Kanata North Business Park.

In 2011 Richcraft Homes agreed to pay $500,000 for a 15-year naming rights agreement for the recreation complex. The complex is also an access point to the Trillium Woods, a 15-kilometre multi-use trail network for hiking and mountain biking.

== Amenities ==
The complex's amenities include the following:

- Free public Wi-Fi
- Indoor eight-lane, 25-meter pool
- Separate male and female change rooms
- Alternate needs/Family change room
- Multi-purpose programming rooms
- Two full gymnasiums
- Weight and cardio centre
- Sports turf field
- Basketball court
- Play structures and splash pad
- Skateboard park
- Youth room
