= Ibrahim Condé =

Canadian soccer player (born 2001)

Personal information
- Date of birth: July 20, 2001 (age 25)
- Place of birth: Montreal, Québec, Canada
- Height: 6 ft 2 in (1.88 m)
- Position: Forward

Team information
- Current team: FC Supra du Québec
- Number: 99

Youth career
- –2018: CS Braves d'Ahuntsic

College career
Years	Team	Apps	(Gls)
2020–2022	Iowa Western Reivers	59	(32)
2023–2024	New Hampshire Wildcats	24	(8)
2025	NC State Wolfpack	13	(0)

Senior career*
Years	Team	Apps	(Gls)
2019	CS Monteuil	7	(0)
2021	CS St-Hubert	4	(3)
2022	AS Blainville	12	(5)
2024	Seacoast United Phantoms	12	(9)
2025	FC Laval	12	(7)
2026–	FC Supra du Québec	19	(6)
- * Club domestic league appearances and goals as of November 13, 2026

Ibrahim Condé (born July 10, 2001) is a Canadian soccer player who plays for FC Supra du Québec in the Canadian Premier League.

== Early life ==
Condé played youth soccer with CS Braves d'Ahuntsic.

== College career ==
In 2020, Condé began attending Iowa Western Community College, where he played for the men's soccer team. In 2021, he helped them win the NJCAA Division I title, being named Offensive Player of the Tournament. He also earned First Team All-Region honours all three seasons.

In 2023, he transferred to the University of New Hampshire to play for the men's soccer team at the NCAA Division I level. On October 26, 2023, he scored his first goal in a 5–0 victory over the UMass Lowell River Hawks. In 2024, he was named the America East Conference Offensive Player of the Week on two occasions. At the end of the season, he was named to the All-America East First Team and invited to the MLS College Showcase.

In 2025, he began attending North Carolina State University, where he joined the men's soccer team. He made his debut on August 21, 2025, against the Queens Royals.

== Club career ==
Condé began his senior career in the PLSQ in 2019 with CS Monteuil. In 2021, he played with CS St-Hubert, followed by joining AS Blainville in 2022.

In 2024, he played with the Seacoast United Phantoms in USL League Two, with whom he won the USL League Two title.

In 2025, he played with FC Laval in Ligue1 Québec.

In March 2026, he signed with FC Supra du Québec in the Canadian Premier League on a one-year contract with an option for 2027.
