= Thomas Lebeuf =

Canadian soccer player (born 2006)

Personal information
- Date of birth: February 11, 2006 (age 20)
- Place of birth: Verdun, Québec, Canada
- Height: 1.78 m (5 ft 10 in)
- Position: Defender

Team information
- Current team: FC Supra du Québec
- Number: 3

Youth career
- CS Rebelles de l'Est
- CS Mont-Royal Outremont

College career
| Years | Team | Apps | (Gls) |
| 2024–2025 | UNLV Rebels | 19 | (0) |

Senior career*
| Years | Team | Apps | (Gls) |
- CS Mont-Royal Outremont
| 2026– | FC Supra du Québec | 4 | (0) |
- * Club domestic league appearances and goals as of August 17, 2026

Thomas Lebeuf (born February 11, 2006) is a Canadian soccer player who plays for FC Supra du Québec in the Canadian Premier League.

== Early life ==
Lebeuf played youth soccer with CS Rebelles de l'Est. He later played with CS Mont-Royal Outremont. In July 2025, he had a trial with Canadian Premier League club Forge FC.

== College career ==
In 2024, Lebeuf began attending the University of Nevada, Las Vegas, where he played for the men's soccer team. He was named to the WAC All-Academic Team in his sophomore season.

== Club career ==
Lebeuf began his senior career with CS Mont-Royal Outremont in Ligue1 Québec.

In January 2026, he signed with FC Supra du Québec in the Canadian Premier League on a two-year contract with an option for 2028.
