= Călin Calaidjoglu =

Moldovan footballer (born 2001)

Personal information
- Date of birth: 18 January 2001 (age 25)
- Place of birth: Chișinău, Moldova
- Height: 1.72 m (5 ft 7 1/2 in)
- Position: Midfielder

Team information
- Current team: FC Supra du Québec
- Number: 17

Youth career
- CS LaSalle
- Marcet Academy
- 2015–2019: Montreal Impact
- 2019: → Bologna (loan)

College career
Years	Team	Apps	(Gls)
2025–	Montreal Carabins		

Senior career*
Years	Team	Apps	(Gls)
2019–2020	Cholet B		
2020–2021	Béziers	0	(0)
2022–2023	Sfîntul Gheorghe	28	(2)
2023	Petrocub Hîncești	6	(0)
2024–2025	FC Laval	34	(7)
2026–	FC Supra du Québec	2	(0)
- * Club domestic league appearances and goals as of August 17, 2026

Călin Calaidjoglu (born 18 January 2001) is a Moldovan footballer who plays as a midfielder for FC Supra du Québec in the Canadian Premier League.

== Early life ==
Born in Moldova, Calaidjoglu moved with his family to LaSalle, Quebec in Canada at the age of two. He began playing youth soccer at age five with CS LaSalle. He later spent three years playing with the Marcet Academy in Spain. In 2015, he joined the Montreal Impact Academy. In March 2019, he went on loan with the academy of Italian club Bologna.

== University career ==
In 2025, Calaidjoglu began attending the Université de Montréal, where he played for the men's soccer team. In 2025, he was named a U Sports Second Team All-Canadian.

== Club career ==
In June 2019, he signed for French side Cholet on a three-year contract. He had come on trial with the club for two weeks with both the second and first teams prior to signing.

In September 2020, he signed with Béziers in the French fourth tier.

In February 2022, he signed for Moldovan club Sfîntul Gheorghe.

In July 2023, he signed with Petrocub Hîncești in the Moldovan Super Liga. During the 23-24 winter break, he departed the club.

He then played with FC Laval in Ligue1 Québec.

At the 2026 CPL-U Sports Draft, he was selected first overall by FC Supra du Québec. In March 2026, he signed a U Sports contract with the club, allowing him to maintain his university eligibility.

== International career ==
Calaidjoglu is eligible to represent Moldova, Turkey, and Canada at international level.

In December 2015, he was called up to a camp with the Canada U15 team for the first time. In October 2018, he was called up to the Canada U20 team to a pre-tournament camp for the 2018 CONCACAF U-20 Championship, but did not make the final squad.

In February 2022, he was called up to the Moldova U21.
