= Matisse Chrétien =

Canadian soccer player (born 2003)

Personal information
- Date of birth: September 18, 2003 (age 23)
- Place of birth: Contrecœur, Québec, Canada
- Height: 1.93 m (6 ft 4 in)
- Position: Defender

Team information
- Current team: FC Supra du Québec
- Number: 4

Youth career
- CS Bas-Richelieu
- CS St-Hubert

College career
Years	Team	Apps	(Gls)
2023	McGill Redbirds	10	(1)
2024	Green Bay Phoenix	18	(1)
2025	San Francisco Dons	17	(0)

Senior career*
Years	Team	Apps	(Gls)
2021–2024	CS St-Hubert		
2025	RKC Third Coast	10	(0)
2026–	FC Supra du Québec	16	(2)
- * Club domestic league appearances and goals as of August 17, 2026

Matisse Chrétien (born September 18, 2003) is a Canadian soccer player who plays for FC Supra du Québec in the Canadian Premier League.

== Early life ==
Chrétien played youth soccer with CS Bas-Richelieu, later joining CS St-Hubert. In 2023, he had a two-week trial with FC Lorient in France.

== College career ==
In 2023, he began attending McGill University, where he played for the men's soccer team. On October 13, 2023, he scored his first goal in a 1-1 draw against the Laval Rouge et Or. At the end of the season, he was named team MVP, an RSEQ First Team All-Star, RSEQ All-Rookie Team, and the U Sports All-Rookie Team.

In 2024, he moved to the United States to attend the University of Wisconsin–Green Bay, where he joined the men's soccer team. On November 5, 2024, he scored his first goal in a 1-1 draw against the Milwaukee Panthers.

In 2025, he transferred to the University of San Francisco, joining the men's soccer team. On August 21, 2025, he made his debut in a match against the UC Davis Aggies.

== Club career ==
Chrétien began playing at the senior level with CS St-Hubert in Ligue1 Quebec.

In 2025, he played with RKC Third Coast in USL League Two.

In January 2026, he signed with FC Supra du Québec in the Canadian Premier League on a one-year contract with an option for 2027. On April 24, 2026, he scored his first goal, which was also the club's first-ever home goal, in a 2-1 victory over HFX Wanderers FC.
