= Oussama Boughanmi (footballer) =

Tunisian footballer

Personal information
- Date of birth: 5 January 1990 (age 36)
- Place of birth: Tunis, Tunisia
- Height: 1.86 m (6 ft 1 in)
- Position: Midfielder

Youth career
- 1998–2008: Stade Tunisien
- 2008–2009: EA Guingamp

Senior career*
Years	Team	Apps	(Gls)
2009	EA Guingamp B	3	(0)
2009–2013	Espérance de Tunis	18	(0)
2013	ES Sahel	2	(0)
2013–2014	Al-Madina		
2014–2015	Al Ittihad Alexandria	22	(0)
2015–2016	Stade Tunisien	20	(1)
2016–2017	Al-Ahli Manama		
2017–2019	Al-Riffa		
2019–2020	Al-Ahli Tripol		
2020	ES Métlaoui	12	(5)
2020–2021	Hajer	29	(3)
2021	Chebba		
2021	Najran	15	(1)
2023	CS Saint-Laurent	8	(2)
2023–2024	Mudhar		
2024	Al-Entesar		
2024	CS Saint-Laurent	8	(0)
2025	Lakeshore SC	9	(1)
2026	FC Supra du Québec	9	(1)

International career^{‡}
2007	Tunisia U17	3	(1)

Managerial career
- 2026–: FC Supra du Québec (assistant)
- * Club domestic league appearances and goals as of 11 August 2026 ‡ National team caps and goals as of December 31, 2007

Oussama Boughanmi (Arabic: أسامة بوغانمي; born 5 January 1990) is a Tunisian former footballer, who serves as an assistant coach with FC Supra du Québec in the Canadian Premier League.

== Early life ==
Boughanmi began playing with Stade Tunisien at age eight. After playing in the 2007 FIFA U17 World Cup, he joined the youth system of French club En Avant Guingamp. He had previously had trials with Paris Saint-Germain and FC Metz.

== Club career ==
=== Early career in France and Tunisia ===
In 2009, Boughanmi made three appearances for Guingamp B in the fourth tier Championnat de France Amateur.

In July 2009, Boughanmi joined Espérance de Tunis on a five-year contract. Initially his agent attempted to block the deal, due to having a previous disagreement with the club over the transfer of another one of his clients (Henri Bienvenu), however, the issues were resolved and he joined the club shortly afterwards. After initially being mainly a substitute, he would make his first start on 29 October 2009, in the first leg of the semi-finals of the 2009 North African Cup of Champions against Al Ittihad Tripoli of Libya. In December 2012, it was announced that he would depart the club.

In January 2013, he signed a three-and-a-half year contract with ES Sahel.

=== Time in Libya, Egypt, Tunisia, and Bahrain ===
Later in 2013, he joined Al-Madina SC in Libya.

In September 2014, he joined Al Ittihad Alexandria Club in Egypt.

In 2015, he returned to Tunisia with Stade Tunisien.

In 2016, he joined Bahraini club Al Ahli Manama.

In January 2017, he signed an initial one-and-a-half year contract with Bahraini side Al-Riffa SC. In June 2018, he terminated the remainder of his contract which was due to expire in June 2020.

In January 2019, he joined Al Ahli Tripoli in Libya.

In January 2020, he signed with Tunisian club ES Métlaoui on a one-and-a-half year contract. On 1 March 2020, he scored the winning goal in a 1-0 victory over Avenir d'Oued Ellil in the Round of 32 in the 2019–20 Tunisian Cup to advance to the next round.

=== Saudi Arabia, Tunisia, and Canada ===
In September 2020, he signed a one-year contract with Saudi Arabia club Hajer FC in the Saudi First Division League.

In August 2021, he signed with CS Chebba in Tunisia.

Later in 2021, he joined Najran in Saudi Arabia.

In April 2023, he signed a deal with CS Saint-Laurent of Ligue1 Quebec on a one-year contract.

On 2 July 2023, Boughanmi joined Saudi club Mudhar. In 2024, he signed with Al-Entesar Club in Saudi Arabia.

Later in 2024, he returned to Canada with CS St-Laurent. The following year, he joined Lakeshore SC in Ligue2 Quebec.

In December 2025, he signed with FC Supra du Québec in the Canadian Premier League for the 2026 season. In September 2026, he agreed to a mutual termination of the remainder of his contract, before being named an assistant coach with the team.

== International career ==
In 2007, Boughanmi was named to the Tunisia U17 squad for the 2007 FIFA U-17 World Cup, scoring in the match against Belgium U17.

== Coaching career ==
In October 2026, he was named an assistant coach with FC Supra du Québec in the Canadian Premier League.

== Honours ==
Espérance de Tunis

- Tunisian Ligue Professionnelle 1: 2010-11, 2011–12
- Tunisian Cup: 2011
- CAF Champions League: 2011
