= Centre Sportif Bois-de-Boulogne =

Soccer centre in Laval, Canada

Coordinates: 45°34′27″N 73°42′19″W

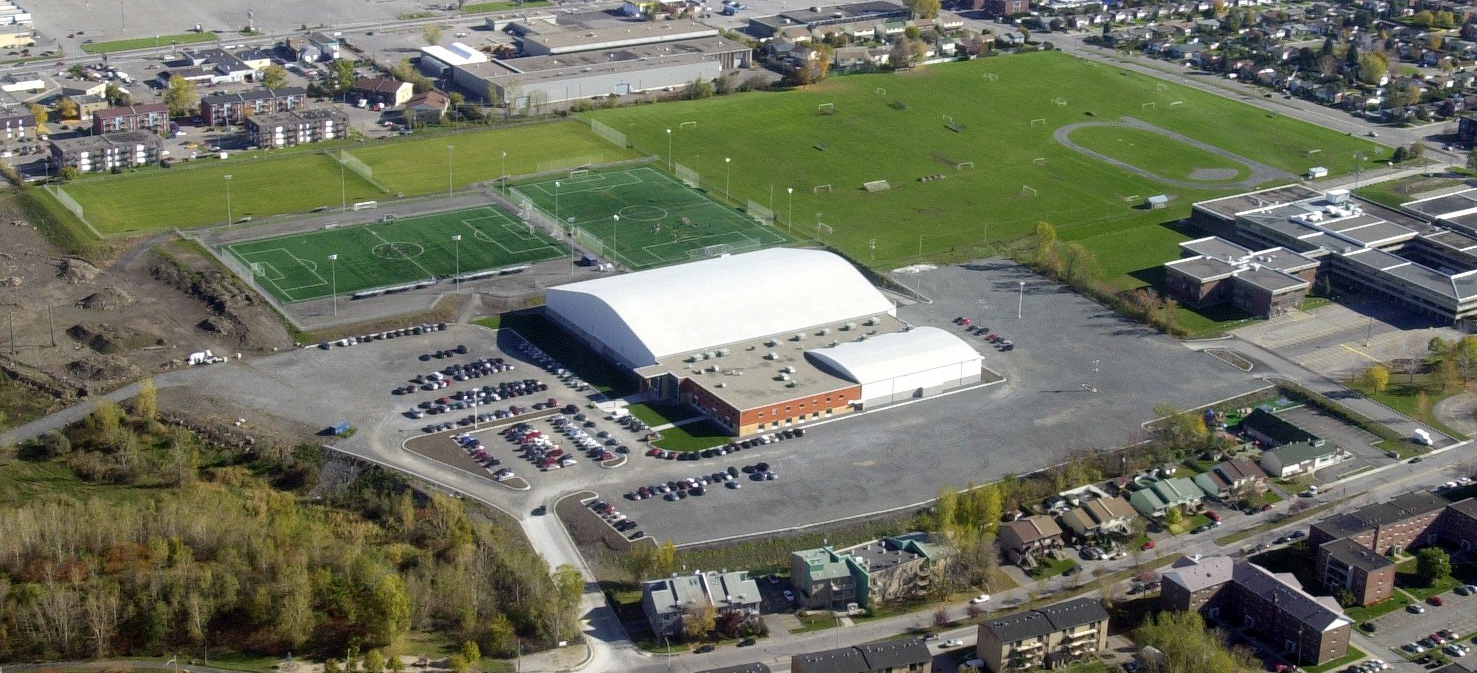
- The centre and its outdoor grounds
- Interactive map of Centre Sportif Bois-de-Boulogne
- Address: 955 Ave de Bois-de-Boulogne; Laval, Quebec H4N 1L3; Canada
- Capacity: 1,000 (expands to 6,000)
- Current use: Soccer

Tenants
- Montreal Roses FC (NSL) 2025–present FC Supra du Québec (CPL) 2026–present Laval Comets (W-League) 2006–2015

Website
- https://www.complexesportif.bdeb.qc.ca/

The Centre sportif Bois-de-Boulogne is a soccer centre situated in the city of Laval, a suburb of Montreal, in the province of Quebec in Canada.

Stade Boréale is the primary field in the complex and seats more than 5,000 spectators. It is home to two professional soccer teams, Montreal Roses FC of the Northern Super League and FC Supra du Québec of the Canadian Premier League.

== Outdoor soccer fields ==
The centre has six outdoor grounds within FIFA's official dimensions, two of which are synthetic turf fields. One of its grounds possesses terraces that can accommodate 1,000 supporters.

On January 30, 2025, the Montreal Roses FC announced they would play their inaugural season in the NSL at Centre Sportif Bois-de-Boulogne. The venue has a capacity of 5,581 spectators and serves as the primary home of the Montréal Roses. It will also be available for other events. This is the first stadium in Canada specifically designed to meet the needs of a women's professional soccer team.

Beginning in 2026, the stadium will also be the home of FC Supra du Québec of the Canadian Premier League.

== Indoor soccer fields ==
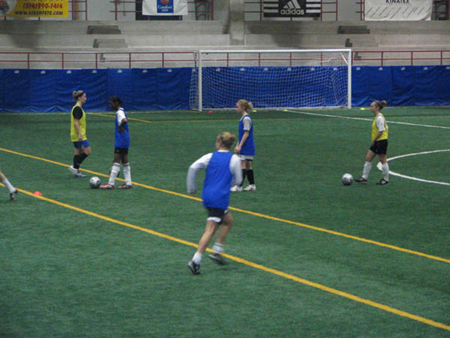
Indoor grounds in the Centre Sportif Bois-de-Boulogne

The building is completely made out of wood, with nine immense wooden arcs that establish the main part of the structure offer an immense free space. These arcs have a reach of 72 metres and rise up to 20 metres off the ground and represent an architectural feature. During the winter, with the permanent indoor ground, an outside synthetic ground near the building is covered with a heated air-supported dome.

The Centre Sportif Bois-de-Boulogne possesses the other installations, some of which are a physical conditioning room and two indoor gymnasiums. Volleyball and badminton can be practiced in them. The staff of the centre include athletes and trainers. Several other services are offered including sports therapy, physiotherapy, and sports camps for young boys and girls. It was one of the first major sports facilities in Quebec to integrate geothermal heating for energy efficiency.

== Tournaments ==
The sports complex welcomes several tournaments of provincial and national level, besides being the permanent residence of the now defunct Laval Comets in the W-League.

The Centre Sportif Bois-de-Boulogne of Laval also contains the offices of various local soccer associations, and those of Soccer Québec.
