= Collège Montmorency =

Public college in Laval, Quebec

Coordinates: 45.5602°N 73.7189°W

- Motto: L'être humain d'abord.
- Motto in English: Achieve
- Type: public college
- Established: November 5th, 1969
- Academic affiliations: ACCC, CCAA, QSSF, CBIE
- Principal: Benoit Lessard
- Students: 8,800 regular students; full time (September 2nd, 2024)
- Location: 475 de l'Avenir boulevard Laval (Chomedey), Quebec H7N 5H9, Laval, Quebec, Canada
- Campus: Urban
- Colours: Blue & white
- Nickname: Les Nomades Montmorency
- Mascot: Les Nomades
- Website: www.cmontmorency.qc.ca

Collège Montmorency (French pronunciation: [kɔlɛʒ mɔ̃mɔʁɑ̃si]) is a public college in Chomedey, Laval, Quebec, Canada, near the Montmorency Metro station. As of 2024, there were over 8,800 full-time students enrolled.

== History ==
In 1967, several institutions were merged and became public ones, when the Quebec system of public colleges was created. Despite Laval being the third largest city of Quebec with a population of nearly 400,000 inhabitants, Montmorency is its only college. It was founded on November 5, 1969 and named after François de Laval, Bishop of Quebec also known as Francis-Xavier de Montmorency-Laval.

== Programs ==
The college offers two types of programs: pre-university and technical. The pre-university programs, which take two years to complete, cover the subject matters which roughly correspond to the additional year of high school given elsewhere in Canada in preparation for a chosen field in university plus a first year of university. (Thus why undergraduates degrees in Quebec are three years rather than four, except for engineering) The technical programs, which take three-years to complete, applies to students who wish to pursue a skill trade. In addition Continuing education and services to business are provided.

=== Pre-university programs ===
- Science
  - Health science
  - Pure and applied science
- Social science
  - Organisation administration
  - World and society: the major challenges (optional mathematics)
  - Glance at the individual
- Arts and letters
  - Communication
  - Cinema
  - Literature
  - Languages, culture, and traduction
- Dance
- Visual arts

Usually, pre-university programs require four semesters (two years) to complete. Students can then pursue further studies at university in a field related to their DEC.

=== Double diploma programs ===
- Health science and World and society: the major challenges (optional mathematics)
- Pure and applied science and World and society: the major challenges (optional mathematics)
- Health science and visual arts
- Pure and applied science and visual arts
- Health science and dance
- Pure and applied science and dance
- Visual arts and Organization administration
- Visual arts and Glance at the individual
- Visual arts and World and society: the major challenges (optional mathematics)
- Dance and Organization administration
- Dance and Glance at the individual
- Dance and World and society: the major challenges (optional mathematics)

Usually, double diploma programs require six semesters (three years) to complete.

=== Technical/Career programs ===
- Biological programs
  - Nursing
  - Nutrition technology
  - Physical rehabilitation technology
  - Orthotic and orthopedic prosthesis technology
- Agribusiness programs:
  - Marketing landscape and ornamental horticulture technology
- Physics programs:
  - Architectural technology
  - Civil engineering technology
  - Building assessment and evaluation technology
  - Electronics technology
  - Industrial electronics technology
- Human programs:
  - Firefighting technology
  - Children education technology
- Administration programs:
  - Administration and accounting technology
  - Insurance and financial service council
  - Business administration
  - Desktop publishing and hypermedia
  - Tourism technology
  - Computer science technology
  - Managing a food service establishment
- Arts programs:
  - Museology techniques

Usually, technical and career programs require six semesters (three years) to complete. Following the completion of their diploma, students can go on the job market or pursue further studies in university in a field related to their diploma.

== Athletics ==
Montmorency's basketball team is among the best in all Canada. The men and women team won many medals in the national championship. In 2006, both teams won the gold medal in the national championship, the boys team winning after trailing by 19 points at the half against the home team of the tournament.

== Drama ==
It is also known for its improvisation league, the MIM (Mouvement d'Improvisation de Montmorency - Montmorency Improvisation Movement), founded in the seventies, from which emerged a number of largely known (in Quebec) comedians and humorists such as Michel Courtemanche, Réal Bossé or Claude Legault.

== See also ==
- List of colleges in Quebec
- Higher education in Quebec
- Canadian Interuniversity Sport
- Canadian government scientific research organizations
- Canadian university scientific research organizations
- Canadian industrial research and development organizations
