= FC Supra du Québec =

Men's soccer club in Laval, Quebec

- Full name: Football Club Supra du Québec
- Short name: Supra
- Founded: September 24, 2025; 13 months ago
- Stadium: Stade Boréale; Laval, Quebec
- Capacity: 5,581
- Owners: Matt Rizzetta; Angelo Pasto; Stéphane Tétrault; Jean-François Chenail
- President: Rocco Placentino
- Head coach: Kyt Selaidopoulos
- League: Canadian Premier League
- 2026: Regular season: 4th Playoffs: Semifinals
- Website: https://www.cplsoccer.com/fcsupra
Home colours	Away colours

FC Supra du Québec is a Canadian professional soccer club based in Laval, Quebec, that competes in the Canadian Premier League, the top tier of the Canadian soccer league system. The club plays their home matches at Stade Boréale. The club was founded in September 2025 and played its first match on April 11, 2026.

== History ==
Since 2021, there had been interest in forming an expansion franchise in the Canadian Premier League in the province of Quebec. In 2025, the Canadian Premier League began hosting events in the province of Quebec, beginning with a league match between York United FC and HFX Wanderers FC, hosted in Quebec City on May 31, 2025. In addition, they held a CPL U19 Showcase match that day.

On September 24, 2025, the Canadian Premier League officially announced that an expansion club would be awarded, based in Laval, Quebec and would begin play in the 2026 season as the league's ninth club. The ownership group includes Matt Rizzetta and Angelo Pasto, who both hold ownership shares in Italian clubs Campobasso and SSD Res Roma, American club Brooklyn FC, and Italian basketball team Napoli Basket, as well as Stephane Tetrault, owner of GameStop Canada, and Jean-Francois Chenail. Former Canada national team player Rocco Placentino would serve as the club's inaugural President. The club would begin play out of Stade Boréale, sharing the ground with women's Northern Super League club Montreal Roses FC. The club's name, logo, and colours were selected to pay homage to former club Montreal Supra, who played in the original Canadian Soccer League from 1988 to 1992. The club chose to use the province's name of Quebec, rather than a city name, as they aim to have a roster made entirely of Québécois players, similar to the roster construction of Spanish club Athletic Bilbao, who use players exclusively from the Basque Country.

On October 30, 2025, FC Supra announced that Nick Razzaghi and Mateo Cabanettes, who had both worked with club president Placentino at Ligue1 Québec side CS Saint-Laurent, would serve as the club's first head coach and sporting director, respectively. On November 28, FC Supra took part in their first CPL–U Sports Draft, selecting Călin Calaidjoglu and Alexandre Marcoux with the first two overall picks. On December 10, the club officially announced Québécois players David Choinière, Loïc Kwemi and Sean Rea as their inaugural signings. FC Supra defeated Pacific FC 3–2 in their inaugural match on April 11, 2026.

=== Kit suppliers and shirt sponsors ===
FC Supra kits
Period	Kit manufacturer	Shirt sponsor (chest)	Shirt sponsor (sleeve)
2026–present	Hummel	EB Games	Moneris

== Players and staff ==
=== Roster ===
As of September 18, 2026

Note: Flags indicate national team as defined under FIFA eligibility rules; some limited exceptions apply. Players may hold more than one non-FIFA nationality.

No.	Pos.	Nation	Player
2	MF	HAI	Charles Auguste
3	DF	CAN	Thomas Lebeuf
4	DF	CAN	Matisse Chrétien
5	DF	CAN	Keesean Ferdinand
6	MF	CAN	Alessandro Biello
7	FW	CAN	David Choinière
8	MF	CAN	Omar Elkalkouli
9	FW	CAN	Loïc Kwemi
10	MF	CAN	Sean Rea
11	DF	CAN	Diyaeddine Abzi
12	FW	CAN	Clément Bayiha
13	FW	CAN	Alexander Makarova
15	DF	CAN	Isaiah Byer
16	GK	CAN	Jolan Faury
17	MF	MDA	Călin Calaidjoglu

No.	Pos.	Nation	Player
18	FW	CAN	Alexandre Marcoux
19	MF	USA	Jack McInerney
20	MF	TUN	Oussama Boughanmi
21	MF	CAN	Olivier Correa
23	DF	CAN	Zachary Fernandez
24	MF	CAN	Safwane Mlah
32	GK	ITA	Joakim Milli
33	MF	MLI	Aboubacar Sissoko
37	DF	CAN	Sasha Deslandes
49	DF	CAN	Eliakim Awonongbadje
64	MF	CAN	Wesley Wandje
77	FW	CAN	Riad Bey
80	GK	SEN	Makhoudia Diop
92	FW	CAN	Noah dos Santos
99	FW	CAN	Ibrahim Condé

=== Management ===
As of November 12, 2025

Ownership
Owner	(United States) Matt Rizzetta
Owner	(Canada) Angelo Pasto
Owner	(Canada) Stéphane Tétrault
Owner	(Canada) Jean-François Chenail
Executive
President	(Canada) Rocco Placentino
Executive advisor	(Canada) Nick De Santis
Sporting director	(Canada) Kyt Selaidopoulos
Coaching staff
Head coach	(Canada) Kyt Selaidopoulos
Assistant coach	Anthony Corneli
Goalkeepers coach	Rino Angelillo

=== Head coaches ===
As of November 8, 2026

Coach	Nation	Tenure	Record				
Coach	Nation	Tenure	Pld	W	D	L	Win %
Nicholas Razzaghi	Canada	October 30, 2025 – September 28, 2026	28	9	6	13	32.14
Kyt Selaidopoulos	Canada	September 28, 2026 – present	7	5	1	1	71.43

=== Club captains ===
Years	Player	Nation
2026–	David Choinière	Canada

== Player records ==
=== Most career goals ===
As of November 9, 2026

#	Pos.	Name	Nation	Career at club	Goals scored			
#	Pos.	Name	Nation	Career at club	CPL	CC	Int'l	Total
1	Forward	**Loïc Kwemi**	Canada	2026–	15	1	0	**16**
2	Forward	**Ibrahim Condé**	Canada	2026–	6	3	0	**9**
2	Midfielder	**Sean Rea**	Canada	2026–	7	2	0	**9**
4	Midfielder	**Safwane Mlah**	Canada	2026–	5	0	0	**5**
5	Defender	**Matisse Chrétien**	Canada	2026–	4	0	0	**4**

Note: Bold indicates active player

=== Most career assists ===
As of November 9, 2026

#	Pos.	Name	Nation	Career at club	Goals assisted			
#	Pos.	Name	Nation	Career at club	CPL	CC	Int'l	Total
1	Midfielder	**Sean Rea**	Canada	2026–	6	0	0	**6**
1	Forward	**David Choinière**	Canada	2026–	5	1	0	**6**
1	Defender	**Diyaeddine Abzi**	Canada	2026–	5	1	0	**6**
1	Forward	**Loïc Kwemi**	Canada	2026–	4	2	0	**6**
5	Forward	**Ibrahim Condé**	Canada	2026–	2	1	0	**3**

Note: Bold indicates active player
