= CF Montréal U23 =

Canadian soccer team

- Full name: CF Montréal U23
- Founded: 2014; 2020 (re-founded)
- Dissolved: September 8, 2024
- Stadium: Centre Nutrilait
- Owner: Joey Saputo
- Head coach: Patrick Viollat
- League: Ligue1 Québec
- 2024: L1Q, 6th
- Website: https://en.cfmontreal.com/academy/
Home colours	Away colours

CF Montréal U23, formerly Montreal Impact U23, was a Canadian soccer team based in Montreal, Quebec, Canada that played in Ligue1 Québec. They were the reserve club of Major League Soccer club CF Montréal and represented the highest team of the CF Montréal Academy. Previously known as Montreal Impact U23, in 2014, they played in the Premier Development League, the fourth tier. The team was replaced the following year with FC Montreal in the professional second-tier USL Pro. In 2020, it was announced that the U23 team would be re-started for the 2021 season.

== History ==
From 2010 to 2012, the Montreal Impact Academy fielded their U21 team in the Canadian Soccer League, which was recognized as a tier 3 league in the Canadian soccer league system. However, the team withdrew from the league prior to the 2013 season, as the Canadian Soccer Association de-sanctioned the league as the CSA board of directors adopted a new soccer structure in Canada and also due to allegations of a match-fixing scandal.

In 2014, the club decided to re-brand the team as a U23 team and entered the team into the Premier Development League, in the fourth tier of the United States soccer league system. They played their first match on 17 May against the Westchester Flames, which they won by a score of 4–0. They finished the season in fourth place in the Northeast Division.

In 2015, the Impact decided to form a reserve professional team in the second tier USL Pro called FC Montreal. As a result, the PDL team was disbanded with most of the players moving to the new pro reserve team.

The club announced that they would reform a U23 team for the 2021 season. with Patrice Bernier serving as post-formation supervisor, where he will work primarily with the first team players in the U23 team. Throughout the 2021 season, the U23s played friendlies against the teams in the Première ligue de soccer du Québec. They joined the PLSQ as formal members in 2022. In July 2024, they announced they would disband the team and depart Ligue1 Quebec (the re-branded name of the PLSQ) at the end of the 2024 season.

== Record ==
Year by year

Year	Tier	League	Record	Rank	Playoffs	League Cup
2014	4	Premier Development League	7–2–5	4th, Northeast	Did not qualify	—
2015-21	On hiatus					
2022	3	Première ligue de soccer du Québec	12–2–8	6th	—	Did not qualify
2023	3	Ligue1 Québec	12–4–6	5th	—	First Round
2024	3	Ligue1 Québec	7–5–8	6th	—	Semi-finals

== Players and staff ==
=== Coaching staff ===
As of May 1, 2023

- (France) Patrick Viollat – Head Coach
- (France) Sylvain Hascoët – Assistant Coach
- (Canada) Christopher Cinelli-Faia – Goalkeepers Coach
- (France) Anthony Hostalier – Fitness Coach

=== Players with multiple nationalities ===
- (Haiti) (Canada) Judewellin Michel
- (Canada) (Haiti) Jaylen Vilsaint
- (Canada) (Switzerland) Thomas Bouffard
- (Canada) (Serbia) Nikola Markovic
- (Ivory Coast) (Canada) Ismaël Yeo
- (Algeria) (Canada) Rayane Tchemmoun
- (Cameroon) (Canada) Loïc Sany Kong
- (Jordan) (Canada) Abdallah Habush
- (France) (United States) Emilio Rossi-Levin
- (Canada) (Italy) Vasilios Tiniakos
- (Canada) (Greece) Costa Iliadis
- (Canada) (Algeria) Yanis Abaiche
- (Canada) (France) Noah Nseke

== Notable former players ==
The following players have either played at the professional or international level, either before or after playing for the CF Montreal U23 team:

- (Canada) Louis Béland-Goyette
- (Canada) Jérémy Gagnon-Laparé
- (Canada) Anthony Jackson-Hamel
- (Canada) Nathan Saliba
- (Canada) Rida Zouhir
