= CS Saint-Laurent =

Canadian soccer club

- Full name: Club de soccer Saint-Laurent
- Nicknames: STL, Saint-Lau
- Founded: 1982
- Head Coach: Chakib Hocine
- League: Ligue1 Québec
- 2025: L1Q, 1st (men); L2Q, 5th - promoted (women)
- Website: https://soccerstlpro.ca/
Home colours	Away colours

Club de Soccer Saint-Laurent is a Canadian soccer club based in the Montreal borough of Saint-Laurent. Founded in 1982 as a youth club, it has played in Ligue1 Québec, a semi-professional league, since 2022.

== History ==
Established as a youth soccer club, the club was founded in 1982. As part of their 40th anniversary in 2022, the club unveiled a new logo, incorporating several elements of their arrondissement's coat of arms and logo while preserving the shape of its old coat of arms – the crown at the top symbolizing the coat of arms of Saint-Laurent, the three points of the latter refer to the three spheres of the Borough's emblem, representing the three main cultural communities at the time of its creation (the French, English and Jewish populations), and the triangular shape in the centre representing mountain peaks.

It was announced that they would enter the men's division of Première Ligue de soccer du Québec starting in 2022. Their desire to join the PLSQ had begun five years earlier, but they delayed their entry as they waited for some of their youth players to age, as well as due to the COVID-19 pandemic. Their debut match occurred on May 7 against Ottawa South United, which they won 6–0. They finished in second place in their inaugural season.

In 2023, the club won the Ligue1 Québec (re-branded from the PLSQ) title, qualifying the club to compete in the 2024 Canadian Championship. In addition, they also won the 2023 Coupe L1QC, completing the league and cup double. In their Canadian Championship debut, they were drawn against the HFX Wanderers of the Canadian Premier League in the first round, whom they defeated in penalty kicks, becoming the first semi-pro side from Québec to defeat a professional club, to advance to the quarter-final round against Major League Soccer club Toronto FC. In the 2024 season, they won the League Cup title for the second consecutive season, while finishing second in the league season. During the 2025 season, they played a friendly match against Moroccan club Wydad AC, as part of their preparations for the 2025 Club World Cup. At the end 2025, they once again finished as league champions.

== Players ==
Note: Flags indicate national team as defined under FIFA eligibility rules; some limited exceptions apply. Players may hold more than one non-FIFA nationality.

No.	Pos.	Nation	Player
1	GK	FRA	Martin Cantona
2	DF	ALG	Samir Morsli-Mahiddine
3	MF	HAI	Cédric Toussaint (captain)
5	DF	MAR	Mohamed Saad Mersadi
6	DF	CAN	Nathan Goulet
7	DF	CAN	Abdelmouhaimen Nboucha
8	MF	CAN	Saad Chaouki
11	FW	CAN	Étienne Tremblay
13	GK	CAN	Jérémy Sanon
15	MF	CAN	Sasha Zelisko
16	FW	CAN	Chimnosoh Okeke
17	FW	CAN	Hansly Felix-Malonga

No.	Pos.	Nation	Player
19	DF	CAN	Obeng Tabi
22	MF	MAR	Rayan Mlah
23	DF	CAN	Tarek Ghamraoui
29	MF	CAN	Nadji Rebai
37	DF	CAN	Sasha Deslandes
41	MF	CAN	Ryan Abou Eid
50	FW	CAN	Zakaria Aggad
64	DF	CAN	Kouassi Cédrick Adamou
68	MF	CAN	Aylan Khenoussi
70	MF	CAN	Matthew Catavolo
88	MF	CAN	Zackarya Oumamass
99	FW	CAN	Younesse El Mehdi Chibane

== Seasons ==
Men

Season	League	Teams	Record	Rank	League Cup	Canadian Championship	Ref
2022	Première Ligue de soccer du Québec	12	16–1–5	2nd	Semi-Finals	did not qualify	
2023	Ligue1 Québec	12	18–1–3	Champions	Champions	did not qualify	
2024	Ligue1 Québec	11	10–7–3	2nd	Champions	Quarter-finals	
2025	Ligue1 Québec	10	13–4–1	Champions	Finalists	did not qualify	

Women

Season	League	Teams	Record	Rank	Playoffs	League Cup	Ref
2025	Ligue2 Québec	19	10–3–5	5th (promoted)	–	–	

== Notable former players ==
The following players have either played at the professional or international level, either before or after playing for the L1Q team:

- (Canada) Jefferson Alphonse
- (Tunisia) Oussema Boughanmi
- (Canada) Mamadou Kane
- (Canada) Ismaël Koné
- (Canada) Loïc Kwemi
- (Canada) Safwane Mlah
- (Canada) Obeng Tabi
- (Ivory Coast) Yann Toualy
