= 2022 in Canadian soccer =

Soccer in Canada
- Season: 2022

Men's soccer
- Canadian Premier League: Forge FC
- MLS Cup: (United States) Los Angeles FC (Note: CF Montréal was the best Canadian club, reaching the Conference Semi-finals of the MLS Cup Playoffs.)
- Supporters' Shield: Los Angeles FC (Note: CF Montréal was the best Canadian club, placing 3rd in the Supporters' Shield standings.)
- League1 Ontario: Vaughan Azzurri
- PLSQ: FC Laval
- League1 BC: TSS FC Rovers
- MLS Next Pro: (United States) Columbus Crew 2 (Note: Toronto FC II was the best Canadian club, reaching the Conference Finals of the MLS Next Pro Playoffs.)
- Canadian Championship: Vancouver Whitecaps FC

Women's soccer
- League1 Ontario: NDC Ontario
- PLSQ: A.S. Blainville
- League1 BC: Whitecaps FC Girls Elite
- Interprovincial Championship: A.S. Blainville

The following are events related to Canadian soccer in the year 2022.

== National teams ==
=== Men’s ===
==== Senior ====
As of November 17, 2022.

Wins	Losses	Draws
7	4	1

===== Friendlies =====
January 22	Guatemala	Cancelled	Canada

June 5	Canada	Cancelled	Iran	Vancouver, British Columbia
16:00 UTC−7		Report		Stadium: BC Place
Note: The match was cancelled amid criticism over concerns related to having Iran as the opposing team. The friendly against Panama was scheduled as a replacement, before it too was cancelled.

June 5	Canada	Cancelled	Panama	Vancouver, British Columbia
16:00 UTC−7		Report		Stadium: BC Place
Note: The match was cancelled due to a pay dispute between the team's players and its governing body, the Canadian Soccer Association.

September 23	Canada	2–0	Qatar	Vienna, Austria
19:00 UTC+2	Larin 4'; David 13'	Report		Stadium: Franz Horr Stadium; Referee: Manuel Schüttengruber (Austria)

September 27	Canada	0–2	Uruguay	Bratislava, Slovakia
18:00 UTC+2		Report	De la Cruz 6'; Núñez 34'	Stadium: Tehelné pole Referee: Peter Kralovic (Slovakia)

November 11	Bahrain	2–2	Canada	Isa Town, Bahrain
15:30 UTC+3	Al-Humaidan 13'; Helal 65' (pen.)	Report	Koné 6'; Haram 81' (o.g.)	Stadium: Khalifa Sports City Stadium; Attendance: 1,000; Referee: Abdullah Jamali (Kuwait)

November 17	Canada	2–1	Japan	Dubai, United Arab Emirates
TBD		Source		Stadium: Al Maktoum Stadium

===== World Cup Qualification =====
====== CONCACAF third round ======
Pos	Team	Pld	W	D	L	GF	GA	GD	Pts	Qualification	Canada	Mexico	United States	Costa Rica	Panama	Jamaica	El Salvador	Honduras
1	Canada	14	8	4	2	23	7	+16	28	2022 FIFA World Cup	—	2–1	2–0	1–0	4–1	4–0	3–0	1–1
2	Mexico	14	8	4	2	17	8	+9	28	2022 FIFA World Cup	1–1	—	0–0	0–0	1–0	2–1	2–0	3–0
3	United States	14	7	4	3	21	10	+11	25	2022 FIFA World Cup	1–1	2–0	—	2–1	5–1	2–0	1–0	3–0
4	Costa Rica	14	7	4	3	13	8	+5	25	Inter-confederation play-offs	1–0	0–1	2–0	—	1–0	1–1	2–1	2–1
5	Panama	14	6	3	5	17	19	−2	21		1–0	1–1	1–0	0–0	—	3–2	2–1	1–1
6	Jamaica	14	2	5	7	12	22	−10	11		0–0	1–2	1–1	0–1	0–3	—	1–1	2–1
7	El Salvador	14	2	4	8	8	18	−10	10		0–2	0–2	0–0	1–2	1–0	1–1	—	0–0
8	Honduras	14	0	4	10	7	26	−19	4		0–2	0–1	1–4	0–0	2–3	0–2	0–2	—

Source: FIFA, CONCACAF
Rules for classification: Tiebreakers

January 27	Honduras	0–2	Canada	San Pedro Sula, Honduras
19:05 UTC−6		Report	Maldonado 10' (o.g.); David 73'	Stadium: Estadio Olímpico Metropolitano; Attendance: 10,000; Referee: Daneon Parchment (Jamaica)

January 30	Canada	2–0	United States	Hamilton, Canada
15:05 UTC−5	Larin 7'; Adekugbe 90+5'	Report		Stadium: Tim Hortons Field; Attendance: 12,000; Referee: Cesar Ramos (Mexico)

February 2	El Salvador	0–2	Canada	San Salvador, El Salvador
20:00 UTC−6		Report	Hutchinson 66'; David 90+3'	Stadium: Estadio Cuscatlán; Attendance: 9,000; Referee: Armando Villarreal (United States)

March 24	Costa Rica	1–0	Canada	San José, Costa Rica
20:05 UTC−6	Borges 45+1'	Report		Stadium: Estadio Nacional; Attendance: 34,000; Referee: Said Martínez (Honduras)

March 27	Canada	4–0	Jamaica	Toronto, Canada
16:05 UTC−4	Larin 13'; Buchanan 44'; Hoilett 83'; Mariappa 88' (o.g.)	Report		Stadium: BMO Field; Attendance: 29,122; Referee: Fernando Guerrero (Mexico)

March 30	Panama	1–0	Canada	Panama City, Panama
20:05 UTC−5	Torres 49'	Report		Stadium: Estadio Rommel Fernández; Attendance: 8,000; Referee: Jair Marrufo (United States)

===== CONCACAF Nations League =====
====== Group C ======
Pos	Team	Pld	W	D	L	GF	GA	GD	Pts	Qualification	(Canada)	(Honduras)	(Curaçao)
1	Canada	4	3	0	1	11	3	+8	9	Qualification for Finals and Gold Cup	—	4–1	4–0
2	Honduras	4	2	0	2	5	7	−2	6	Qualification for Gold Cup	2–1	—	1–2
3	Curaçao	4	1	0	3	2	8	−6	3	Advance to Gold Cup prelims	0–2	0–1	—

Source: CONCACAF

June 9	Canada	4–0	Curaçao	Vancouver, Canada
19:30 UTC−7	Davies 27' (pen.), 71'; Vitória 42'; Cavallini 85'	Report		Stadium: BC Place; Attendance: 17,216; Referee: Nima Saghafi (United States)

June 13	Honduras	2–1	Canada	San Pedro Sula, Honduras
20:00 UTC−6	K. López 13'; Arriaga 78'	Report	David 86'	Stadium: Estadio Olímpico Metropolitano; Referee: Mario Escobar (Guatemala)

===== 2022 FIFA World Cup =====
The final draw was held at the Doha Exhibition and Convention Center in Doha, Qatar, on 1 April 2022, 19:00 AST, prior to the completion of qualification.

Pos	Team	Pld	W	D	L	GF	GA	GD	Pts	Qualification
1	Morocco	3	2	1	0	4	1	+3	7	Advance to knockout stage
2	Croatia	3	1	2	0	4	1	+3	5	Advance to knockout stage
3	Belgium	3	1	1	1	1	2	−1	4	
4	Canada	3	0	0	3	2	7	−5	0	

Source: FIFA
Rules for classification: Group stage tiebreakers

====== Group F ======
November 23	Belgium	1–0	Canada	Al Rayyan, Qatar
22:00 AST (UTC+03:00)	Batshuayi 44'	Report		Stadium: Ahmad bin Ali Stadium; Attendance: 40,432; Referee: Janny Sikazwe (Zambia)

November 27	Croatia	4–1	Canada	Al Rayyan, Qatar
19:00 AST (UTC+03:00)	Kramarić 36', 70'; Livaja 44'; Majer 90+4'	Report	Davies 2'	Stadium: Khalifa International Stadium; Attendance: 44,374; Referee: Andrés Matonte (Uruguay)

December 1	Canada	1–2	Morocco	Doha, Qatar
18:00 AST (UTC+03:00)	Aguerd 40' (o.g.)	Report	Ziyech 4'; En-Nesyri 23'	Stadium: Al Thumama Stadium; Attendance: 43,102; Referee: Raphael Claus (Brazil)

==== U-20 ====
As of April 21, 2022.

Wins	Losses	Draws
1	1	0

===== Friendlies =====
April 15 Friendly	Costa Rica	0–3	Canada	Alajuela Province; Costa Rica
1:00 PM EDT		Report	Habibullah 20'; Jesse Costa 46'; Catavolo 86'	Stadium: Complejo Deportivo FCRF-Plycem

April 21 Friendly	Costa Rica	1–0	Canada	Alajuela Province; Costa Rica
1:00 PM EDT	J. Bennette 15'	Report		Stadium: Complejo Deportivo FCRF-Plycem

===== CONCACAF U-20 Championship =====
Pos	Team	Pld	W	D	L	GF	GA	GD	Pts	Qualification
1	United States	3	2	1	0	15	2	+13	7	Knockout stage
2	Cuba	3	2	0	1	7	3	+4	6	Knockout stage
3	Canada	3	1	1	1	6	3	+3	4	Knockout stage
4	Saint Kitts and Nevis	3	0	0	3	0	20	−20	0	

Source: CONCACAF
Rules for classification: Group stage tiebreakers

====== Group E ======
June 18	Cuba	1–0	Canada	Tegucigalpa, Honduras
18:30 ET	Martín 42'	Report		Stadium: Estadio Nacional; Referee: Said Martínez (Honduras)

June 20	Canada	2–2	United States	Tegucigalpa, Honduras
18:30 ET	Wright 15'; Halliday 69' (o.g.)	Report	McGlynn 53'; Cowell 72'	Stadium: Estadio Nacional; Referee: Marco Ortíz (Mexico)

June 22	Canada	4–0	Saint Kitts and Nevis	Tegucigalpa, Honduras
14:00 ET	Coimbra 60'; Catavolo 65'; Wright 78'; Henry 80'	Report		Stadium: Estadio Nacional; Referee: Oshane Nation (Jamaica)

====== Knockout stage ======
June 26 Round of 16	Guatemala	1–1 (4–3 p)	Canada	Tegucigalpa, Honduras
	Villagrán 119'	Report	Habibullah 100' (pen.)	Stadium: Estadio Nacional; Referee: Daneon Parchment (Jamaica)
	Penalties
	Cabrera (penalty scored); Urizar (penalty scored); Franco (penalty scored); Bantes (penalty missed); Villagrán (penalty scored)		(penalty scored) Pellegrino; (penalty missed) Poku; (penalty scored) Ferdinand; (penalty missed) Smith; (penalty scored) Habibullah

==== U-17 ====
Wins	Losses	Draws
1	1	0

===== Copa México de Naciones Sub-17 =====
December 15	Costa Rica	1–2	Canada	Mexico City; Mexico
5:00 PM EST	Goal	Report	12' (o.g.); Mackenzie	Stadium: Centro de Alto Rendimiento de la Federación Mexicana de Fútbol
Note: Conflicting reports show the result as 0–2 with both goals scored by Liam Mackenzie.

December 19	Mexico	3–0	Canada	Mexico City; Mexico
10:30 AM CST	Carrillo 19', 37'; Moxica 63'	Report		Stadium: Cancha 1 - Centro de Alto Rendimiento de la Federación Mexicana de Fútbol; Referee: Luis López (Mexico)

=== Women’s ===
==== Senior ====
As of November 15, 2022.

Wins	Losses	Draws
11	3	3

===== Friendlies =====
April 8	Canada	2–0	Nigeria	Vancouver
19:30 UTC−7	Fleming 51'; Gilles 72'	Report		Stadium: BC Place; Referee: Lizzet Amairany García Olvera (Mexico)

April 11	Canada	2–2	Nigeria	Langford
19:30 UTC−7		Report		Stadium: Starlight Stadium

June 26	Canada	0–0	South Korea	Toronto, Ontario
15:00 UTC−1				Stadium: BMO Field

September 2	Australia	0–1	Canada	Brisbane, Australia
--:-- UTC+10				Stadium: Suncorp Stadium

September 6	Australia	1–2	Canada	Sydney, Australia
--:-- UTC+10		Report		Stadium: Sydney Football Stadium

October 6	Canada	2–0	Argentina	Jerez, Spain
--:--				Stadium: Estadio Municipal de Chapín

October 10	Canada	4–0	Morocco	Jerez, Spain
--:--				Stadium: Estadio Municipal de Chapín

November 11	Brazil	1–2	Canada	Santos, Brazil
1:15 PM	Debinha 33'	Report	Zadorsky 21'; Leon 29'	Stadium: Vila Belmiro; Attendance: 3768

November 15	Brazil	2–1	Canada	São Paulo, Brazil
				Stadium: Neo Química Arena

===== CONCACAF W Championship =====
====== Group B ======
Pos	Team	Pld	W	D	L	GF	GA	GD	Pts	Qualification
1	Canada	3	3	0	0	9	0	+9	9	Qualification for Women's World Cup and advance to knockout stage
2	Costa Rica	3	2	0	1	7	2	+5	6	Qualification for Women's World Cup and advance to knockout stage
3	Panama	3	1	0	2	1	4	−3	3	Advance to inter-confederation play-offs
4	Trinidad and Tobago	3	0	0	3	0	11	−11	0	

Source: CONCACAF
Rules for classification: Tiebreakers

July 5	Canada	6–0	Trinidad and Tobago	Guadalupe, Mexico
22:00 ET	Sinclair 27'; Grosso 67', 79'; Fleming 84'; Beckie 86'; Huitema 90+1'	Report		Stadium: Estadio BBVA; Referee: Katia García (Mexico)

July 8	Panama	0–1	Canada	San Nicolás de los Garza, Mexico
22:00 ET		Report	Grosso 64'	Stadium: Estadio Universitario; Referee: Tori Penso United States

July 11	Canada	2–0	Costa Rica	Guadalupe, Mexico
19:00 ET	Fleming 5'; Schmidt 69'	Report		Stadium: Estadio BBVA; Referee: Odette Hamilton (Jamaica)

====== Knockout stage ======
July 14 SF	Canada	3–0	Jamaica	San Nicolás de los Garza, Mexico
	Fleming 18'; Chapman 64'; Leon 76'	Report		Stadium: Estadio Universitario; Referee: Melissa Borjas (Honduras)

Final

18 July 2022
21:00

United States	1–0	Canada
Morgan 78' (pen.)	Report (FIFA); Report (CONCACAF)

Estadio BBVA, Guadalupe
Attendance: 17,247
Referee: Katia García (Mexico)

2022 CONCACAF W Championship winners

United States
9th title

===== Arnold Clark Cup =====
Pos	Team	Pld	W	D	L	GF	GA	GD	Pts
1	England (H, C)	3	1	2	0	4	2	+2	5
2	Spain	3	1	2	0	2	1	+1	5
3	Canada	3	1	1	1	2	2	0	4
4	Germany	3	0	1	2	2	5	−3	1

Source: BBC
Rules for classification: 1) points; 2) goal difference; 3) goals scored; 4) head-to-head result; 5) fair play ranking.
(C) Champions; (H) Hosts

February 17	England	1–1	Canada	Middlesbrough, England
19:30 UTC+0	Bright 22'	Report	Beckie 55'	Stadium: Riverside Stadium; Attendance: 8,769; Referee: Lina Lehtovaara (Finland)

February 20	Canada	1–0	Germany	Norwich, England
20:15 UTC+0	Gilles 7'	Report		Stadium: Carrow Road; Referee: Emikar Caldera (Venezuela)

February 23	Spain	1–0	Canada	Wolverhampton, England
14:30 UTC+0	Putellas 21'	Report		Stadium: Molineux Stadium; Referee: Cheryl Foster (Wales)

==== U-20 ====
As of March 12, 2022.

Wins	Losses	Draws
6	1	0

===== CONCACAF Women's U-20 Championship =====
The tournament is taking place from February 25 to March 12, 2022, in the Dominican Republic. Canada qualified directly to the group stage as one of the 16 highest-ranked entrants based on the Concacaf Women’s Under-20 Ranking.

Pos	Team	Pld	W	D	L	GF	GA	GD	Pts	Qualification
1	Canada	3	3	0	0	16	0	+16	9	Knockout stage
2	El Salvador	3	2	0	1	8	4	+4	6	Knockout stage
3	Saint Kitts and Nevis	3	1	0	2	7	14	−7	3	Knockout stage
4	Trinidad and Tobago	3	0	0	3	2	15	−13	0	

Source: CONCACAF
Rules for classification: Group stage tiebreakers

====== Group G ======
February 25	Canada	7–0	Saint Kitts and Nevis	San Cristóbal, Dominican Republic
		Report	Small 9', 33'; Smith 17', 30'; Ward 21', 44'; Courtnall 89'	Stadium: Estadio Panamericano; Referee: Tori Penso (United States)

February 27	El Salvador	0–4	Canada	San Cristóbal, Dominican Republic
		Report	Grant-Clavijo 26'; Smith 53'; Thurton 63', 77'	Stadium: Estadio Panamericano; Referee: Odette Hamilton (Jamaica)

March 1	Canada	5–0	Trinidad and Tobago	San Cristóbal, Dominican Republic
	Ward 37'; Thurton 49'; Melenhorst 58'; Jourde 64'; Novak 90'	Report		Stadium: Estadio Panamericano; Referee: Tatiana Guzmán (Nicaragua)

====== Knockout stage ======
March 4 Round of 16	Canada	13–0	Cayman Islands	Santo Domingo, Dominican Republic
	Novak 5', 51'; Smith 7', 15', 45+2', 47'; Grant-Clavijo 39', 73'; Burns 60'; Courtnall 69'; Pante 74'; Melenhorst 76'; Jourde 85'	Report		Stadium: Estadio Olímpico Félix Sánchez; Referee: Diana Pérez (Mexico)

March 8 Quarter-finals	Canada	1–0	Panama	Santo Domingo, Dominican Republic
	Ward 29' (pen.)	Report		Stadium: Estadio Olímpico Félix Sánchez; Referee: Katja Koroleva (United States)

March 10 Semi-finals	Canada	0–1	Mexico	Santo Domingo, Dominican Republic
		Report	Vázquez 27'	Stadium: Estadio Olímpico Félix Sánchez; Referee: Astrid Gramajo (Guatemala)

March 12 3rd	Puerto Rico	0–2	Canada	Santo Domingo, Dominican Republic
		Report	Burns 38' (pen.); Jourde 39'	Stadium: Estadio Olímpico Félix Sánchez; Referee: Katia García (Mexico)

===== 2022 FIFA U-20 Women's World Cup =====
Pos	Team	Pld	W	D	L	GF	GA	GD	Pts	Qualification
1	Nigeria (A)	2	2	0	0	2	0	+2	6	Knockout stage
2	France	2	1	0	1	3	2	+1	3	Knockout stage
3	South Korea	2	1	0	1	2	1	+1	3	
4	Canada (E)	2	0	0	2	1	5	−4	0	

Updated to match(es) played on 14 August 2022. Source: FIFA
Rules for classification: Group stage tiebreakers
(A) Advance to a further round; (E) Eliminated

====== Group C ======
August 11	Canada	0–2	South Korea	San José, Costa Rica
21:00 ET		Report	Courtnall 53' (o.g.); Mun Ha-yeon 62'	Stadium: Estadio Nacional de Costa Rica; Attendance: 839; Referee: Lina Lehtovaara (Finland)

August 14	France	3–1	Canada	San José, Costa Rica
21:00 ET	Folquet 51', 66'; Mbakem-Niaro 89'	Report	Smith 90+6'	Stadium: Estadio Nacional de Costa Rica; Attendance: 1,327; Referee: Anna-Marie Keighley (New Zealand)

August 17	Nigeria	3–1	Canada	Alajuela, Costa Rica
21:00 ET	Onyenezide 24' (pen.), 32' (pen.); Olise 90+1'	Report	Novak 2'	Stadium: Estadio Alejandro Morera Soto, Alajuela; Attendance: 973; Referee: Lara Lee (Australia)

==== U-17 ====
As of October 18, 2022.

Wins	Losses	Draws
5	2	3

===== CONCACAF U-17 Championship =====
Pos	Team	Pld	W	D	L	GF	GA	GD	Pts	Qualification
1	Canada	3	2	1	0	16	1	+15	7	Knockout stage
2	Jamaica	3	2	1	0	11	2	+9	7	Knockout stage
3	Dominican Republic (H)	3	1	0	2	6	13	−7	3	Knockout stage
4	Bermuda	3	0	0	3	0	17	−17	0	

Source: CONCACAF
Rules for classification: Group stage tiebreakers
(H) Hosts

====== Group E ======
April 24	Canada	10–0	Dominican Republic	Santo Domingo, Dominican Republic
	Adames 25' (o.g.); Maalouf 39' (pen.), 43', 46', 57'; Watson 67', 69'; Allen 85', 89'; Hauer 90+4'	Report		Stadium: Estadio Olímpico Félix Sánchez; Referee: Cecile Hinds (Trinidad and Tobago)

April 26	Bermuda	0–5	Canada	Santo Domingo, Dominican Republic
		Report	Logan 15'; Bordeleau 39'; Hauer 43'; Maalouf 70', 86'	Stadium: Estadio Olímpico Félix Sánchez; Referee: Mayary Cartagena (Guatemala)

April 28	Canada	1–1	Jamaica	San Cristóbal, Dominican Republic
	Watson 50'	Report	Atkinson 38'	Stadium: Estadio Panamericano; Referee: Saphire Stockman (Costa Rica)

====== Knockout stage ======
May 1 Round of 16	Canada	4–1	Honduras	Santo Domingo, Dominican Republic
	Maalouf 34' (pen.), 49', 82'; Allen 88'	Report	Henríquez 28'	Stadium: Estadio Olímpico Félix Sánchez; Referee: Alyssa Nichols (United States)

May 4 QF	Costa Rica	0–3	Canada	San Cristóbal, Dominican Republic
		Report		Stadium: Estadio Panamericano; Referee: Karitza Guerra (Honduras)

May 6 SF	United States	3–0	Canada	Santo Domingo, Dominican Republic
	Rebimbas 18', 58'; Gamero 78'	Report		Stadium: Estadio Olímpico Félix Sánchez; Referee: Sandra Benítez (El Salvador)

May 8 3rd	Puerto Rico	0–3	Canada	Santo Domingo, Dominican Republic
		Report	Hauer 51'; Allen 53'; Maalouf 86'	Stadium: Estadio Olímpico Félix Sánchez; Referee: Amairany García (Mexico)

===== FIFA U-17 Women's World Cup =====
Pos	Team	Pld	W	D	L	GF	GA	GD	Pts	Qualification
1	Japan	3	3	0	0	10	0	+10	9	Knockout stage
2	Tanzania	3	1	1	1	3	6	−3	4	Knockout stage
3	Canada	3	0	2	1	2	6	−4	2	
4	France	3	0	1	2	2	5	−3	1	

Source: FIFA
Rules for classification: Group stage tiebreakers

====== Group D ======
October 12	Canada	1–1	France	Margao, India
	Chukwu 67'	Report	Calba 73'	Stadium: Pandit Jawaharlal Nehru Stadium; Attendance: 3,499; Referee: Bouchra Karboubi (Morocco)

October 15	Japan	4–0	Canada	Margao, India
	Kubota 9'; Shiragaki 37'; Tanikawa 52'; Takaoka 90+2'	Report		Stadium: Pandit Jawaharlal Nehru Stadium; Attendance: 5,492; Referee: María Victoria Daza (Colombia)

October 18	Tanzania	1–1	Canada	Navi Mumbai, India
	Mapunda 35'	Report	Allen 14' (pen.)	Stadium: DY Patil Stadium; Attendance: 3,728; Referee: Pansa Chaisanit (Thailand)

== Club competitions ==
=== Men’s ===
==== Domestic leagues ====
===== Canadian Premier League =====
Eight teams play in the Canadian Premier League, all of which are based in Canada. It is considered a Division 1 men's league in the Canadian soccer league system.

====== Regular season ======
Pos	Team	Pld	W	D	L	GF	GA	GD	Pts	Qualification
1	Atlético Ottawa (S)	28	13	10	5	36	29	+7	49	Advance to playoffs
2	Forge (C)	28	14	5	9	47	25	+22	47	Advance to playoffs
3	Cavalry	28	14	5	9	39	33	+6	47	Advance to playoffs
4	Pacific	28	13	7	8	36	33	+3	46	Advance to playoffs
5	Valour	28	10	7	11	36	34	+2	37	
6	York United	28	9	7	12	31	37	−6	34	
7	HFX Wanderers	28	8	5	15	24	38	−14	29	
8	FC Edmonton	28	4	8	16	31	51	−20	20	

Source: CanPL.ca
Rules for classification: 1) points; 2) total wins; 3) goal differential; 4) goals for; 5) away goals differential; 6) away goals for; 7) home goals differential; 8) home goals for; 9) U-21 minutes; 10) coin toss or drawing of lots.
(C) Champion; (S) Regular season winner

====== Playoffs ======
Semifinals; October 15 & 23
4	Pacific FC	0	1	1
1	Atlético Ottawa	2	1	3
3	Cavalry FC	1	1	2
2	Forge FC	1	2	3

Final; October 30
1	Atlético Ottawa	0
2	Forge FC	2

Semifinal results

Team 1	Agg.	Team 2	1st leg	2nd leg
Pacific FC	1–3	Atlético Ottawa	0–2	1–1
Cavalry FC	2–3	Forge FC	1–1	1–2

Final

October 30, 2022
6:00 pm ET

Atlético Ottawa	0–2	Forge FC
	Recap; Report	Hojabrpour 28'; Choinière 78'

TD Place Stadium, Ottawa, Ontario
Attendance: 14,992
Referee: Filip Dujic

==== Domestic cups ====
===== 2020 Canadian Championship =====
The 2020 Canadian Championship Final was delayed nearly two years due to the COVID-19 pandemic.

June 4, 2022
7:00 pm EDT

Forge FC	1–1	Toronto FC
Borges 60'	Report	Pozuelo 57'
Penalties
Achinioti-Jönsson (penalty scored); Campbell (penalty scored); Pacius (penalty scored); Bekker (penalty missed); Choinière (penalty scored); Poku (penalty missed)	4–5	(penalty scored) Jiménez; (penalty scored) Salcedo; (penalty missed) Kerr; (penalty scored) Pozuelo; (penalty scored) Perruzza; (penalty scored) Thompson

Tim Hortons Field, Hamilton, Ontario
Attendance: 13,715
Referee: Silviu Petrescu

===== 2022 Canadian Championship =====
Preliminary round May 10–11
Cavalry FC	2
FC Edmonton	1
Vancouver Whitecaps FC	2
Valour FC	0
Atlético Ottawa	1 (6)
York United (p)	1 (7)
Guelph United	0
HFX Wanderers	2
Forge FC	2
Mont-Royal Outremont	0

Quarter-finals; May 24–26
Cavalry FC	1 (3)
Vancouver Whitecaps FC (p)	1 (5)
Pacific FC	2 (3)
York United (p)	2 (4)
HFX Wanderers	1
Toronto FC	2
CF Montréal	3
Forge FC	0

Semi-finals; June 22
Vancouver Whitecaps FC	2
York United	1
Toronto FC	4
CF Montréal	0

Final; July 26
Vancouver Whitecaps FC (p)	1 (5)
Toronto FC	1 (3)

====== Final ======
July 26, 2022
7:30 pm PDT
(10:30 pm UTC−4)

Vancouver Whitecaps FC	1–1	Toronto FC
White 19'	Report	MacNaughton 75'
Penalties
Gauld (penalty scored); White (penalty scored); Gressel (penalty scored); Cubas (penalty scored); Blackmon (penalty scored)	5–3	(penalty scored) Criscito; (penalty scored) Perruzza; (penalty missed) Osorio; (penalty scored) Bernardeschi

BC Place, Vancouver, British Columbia
Attendance: 24,307
Referee: Pierre-Luc Lauzière

==== International leagues ====
===== Major League Soccer =====
====== Eastern Conference ======
Pos	Team	Pld	W	L	T	GF	GA	GD	Pts	Qualification
1	Philadelphia Union	34	19	5	10	72	26	+46	67	Qualification for the conference semifinals and the CONCACAF Champions League
2	Montreal Impact (Note: Canadian clubs could not qualify for the 2023 CONCACAF Champions League through the MLS regular season or playoffs.)	34	20	9	5	63	50	+13	65	Qualification for the first round
3	New York City FC	34	16	11	7	57	41	+16	55	Qualification for the first round
4	New York Red Bulls	34	15	11	8	50	41	+9	53	Qualification for the first round
5	FC Cincinnati	34	12	9	13	64	56	+8	49	Qualification for the first round
6	Inter Miami CF	34	14	14	6	47	56	−9	48	Qualification for the first round
7	Orlando City SC	34	14	14	6	44	53	−9	48	Qualification for the first round and the CONCACAF Champions League (Note: as 2022 U.S. Open Cup champions)
8	Columbus Crew	34	10	8	16	46	41	+5	46	
9	Charlotte FC	34	13	18	3	44	52	−8	42	
10	New England Revolution	34	10	12	12	47	50	−3	42	
11	Atlanta United FC	34	10	14	10	48	54	−6	40	
12	Chicago Fire FC	34	10	15	9	39	48	−9	39	
13	Toronto FC	34	9	18	7	49	66	−17	34	
14	D.C. United	34	7	21	6	36	71	−35	27	

Source: MLS
Rules for classification: 1) points; 2) total wins; 3) total goal differential; 4) total goals scored; 5) fewer disciplinary points; 6) away goal differential; 7) away goals scored; 8) home goals differential; 9) home goals scored; 10) coin toss (2 clubs tied) or drawing of lots (≥3 clubs tied)

====== Western Conference ======
Pos	Team	Pld	W	L	T	GF	GA	GD	Pts	Qualification
1	Los Angeles FC	34	21	9	4	66	38	+28	67	Qualification for the conference semifinals and the CONCACAF Champions League
2	Austin FC	34	16	10	8	65	49	+16	56	Qualification for the first round and the CONCACAF Champions League
3	FC Dallas	34	14	9	11	48	37	+11	53	Qualification for the first round
4	LA Galaxy	34	14	12	8	58	51	+7	50	Qualification for the first round
5	Nashville SC	34	13	10	11	52	41	+11	50	Qualification for the first round
6	Minnesota United FC	34	14	14	6	48	51	−3	48	Qualification for the first round
7	Real Salt Lake	34	12	11	11	43	45	−2	47	Qualification for the first round
8	Portland Timbers	34	11	10	13	53	53	0	46	
9	Vancouver Whitecaps FC (Note: Canadian clubs could not qualify for the 2023 CONCACAF Champions League through the MLS regular season or playoffs.)	34	12	15	7	40	57	−17	43	Qualification for the CONCACAF Champions League (Note: as 2022 Canadian Championship winners.)
10	Colorado Rapids	34	11	13	10	46	57	−11	43	
11	Seattle Sounders FC	34	12	17	5	47	46	+1	41	
12	Sporting Kansas City	34	11	16	7	42	54	−12	40	
13	Houston Dynamo FC	34	10	18	6	43	56	−13	36	
14	San Jose Earthquakes	34	8	15	11	52	69	−17	35	

Source: MLS
Rules for classification: 1) points; 2) total wins; 3) total goal differential; 4) total goals scored; 5) fewer disciplinary points; 6) away goal differential; 7) away goals scored; 8) home goals differential; 9) home goals scored; 10) coin toss (2 clubs tied) or drawing of lots (≥3 clubs tied)

===== MLS Next Pro =====
Toronto FC II and Whitecaps FC 2 play in MLS Next Pro. It is considered a Division 3 men's league in the United States soccer league system.

====== Eastern Conference ======
Pos	Div	Team	Pld	W	SOW	SOL	L	GF	GA	GD	Pts	Qualification
1	CT	Columbus Crew 2	24	16	2	3	3	62	22	+40	55	Qualification for the 2022 MLS Next Pro Playoffs
2	NE	Toronto FC II	24	12	2	1	9	44	38	+6	41	Qualification for the 2022 MLS Next Pro Playoffs
3	NE	Philadelphia Union II	24	11	3	1	9	42	39	+3	40	Qualification for the 2022 MLS Next Pro Playoffs
4	NE	Rochester New York FC	24	10	4	2	8	37	30	+7	40	Qualification for the 2022 MLS Next Pro Playoffs
5	NE	New York City FC II	24	9	4	2	9	49	35	+14	37	
6	CT	Inter Miami CF II	24	10	1	4	9	40	49	−9	36	
7	NE	New England Revolution II	24	9	1	4	10	27	42	−15	33	
8	CT	Chicago Fire FC II	24	8	2	3	11	41	44	−3	31	
9	CT	Orlando City B	24	6	2	3	13	40	53	−13	25	
10	CT	FC Cincinnati 2	24	4	2	1	17	27	65	−38	17	

Source: MLSNP Eastern Conference
Rules for classification: 1) points; 2) total wins; 3) total goal differential; 4) total goals scored; 5) fewer disciplinary points; 6) away goal differential; 7) away goals scored; 8) home goals differential; 9) home goals scored; 10) coin toss (2 clubs tied) or drawing of lots (≥3 clubs tied)

====== Western Conference ======
Pos	Div	Team	Pld	W	SOW	SOL	L	GF	GA	GD	Pts	Qualification
1	FR	St. Louis City 2	24	15	1	2	6	51	34	+17	49	Qualification for the 2022 MLS Next Pro Playoffs
2	PC	Tacoma Defiance	24	14	3	1	6	57	25	+32	49	Qualification for the 2022 MLS Next Pro Playoffs
3	FR	Houston Dynamo 2	24	14	2	3	5	38	22	+16	49	Qualification for the 2022 MLS Next Pro Playoffs
4	FR	North Texas SC	24	13	2	3	6	48	31	+17	46	Qualification for the 2022 MLS Next Pro Playoffs
5	PC	San Jose Earthquakes II	24	12	1	3	8	48	37	+11	41	
6	FR	Minnesota United FC 2	24	9	4	1	10	43	39	+4	36	
7	PC	Whitecaps FC 2	24	7	3	5	9	40	40	0	32	
8	FR	Sporting Kansas City II	24	9	1	2	12	31	38	−7	31	
9	FR	Colorado Rapids 2	24	7	4	2	11	33	56	−23	31	
10	PC	Real Monarchs	24	6	1	3	14	28	50	−22	23	
11	PC	Portland Timbers 2	24	2	4	0	18	29	66	−37	14	

Source: MLSNP Western Conference
Rules for classification: 1) points; 2) total wins; 3) total goal differential; 4) total goals scored; 5) fewer disciplinary points; 6) away goal differential; 7) away goals scored; 8) home goals differential; 9) home goals scored; 10) coin toss (2 clubs tied) or drawing of lots (≥3 clubs tied)

==== International competitions ====
Club	Competition	Final round
CF Montréal	2022 CONCACAF Champions League	Quarter-finals
Forge FC	2022 CONCACAF Champions League	Round of 16
Pacific FC	2022 CONCACAF League	Round of 16

===== CONCACAF Champions League =====
====== Round of 16 ======
Team 1	Agg.	Team 2	1st leg	2nd leg
Santos Laguna (Mexico)	1–3	(Canada) CF Montréal	1–0	0–3
Forge FC (Canada)	1–4	(Mexico) Cruz Azul	0–1	1–3

====== Quarter-finals ======
Team 1	Agg.	Team 2	1st leg	2nd leg
Cruz Azul (Mexico)	2–1	(Canada) CF Montréal	1–0	1–1

===== CONCACAF League =====
====== Preliminary round ======
Team 1	Agg.	Team 2	1st leg	2nd leg
Waterhouse (Jamaica)	0–6	(Canada) Pacific FC	0–0	0–6

====== Round of 16 ======
Team 1	Agg.	Team 2	1st leg	2nd leg
Pacific FC (Canada)	1–1 (5–6 p)	(Costa Rica) Herediano	0–1	1–0

===== Leagues Cup =====
Replaced with the Leagues Cup Showcase. No Canadian teams qualified.

===== Campeones Cup =====
No Canadian teams qualified for the Campeones Cup.

=== Women’s ===
==== Domestic leagues ====
===== Interprovincial Championship =====
Semifinals
L1BC	Varsity FC	0
PLSQ-1	A.S. Blainville	2
L1O	Alliance United FC	1 (5)
PLSQ-2	AS Laval	1 (6)

Championship Game
PLSQ-1	A.S. Blainville	3
PLSQ-2	AS Laval	0
Third place
L1BC	Varsity FC	2 (1)
L1O	Alliance United FC	2 (4)

==== International leagues ====
===== National Women's Soccer League =====
No Canadian teams play in the National Women's Soccer League, though players from the Canada women's national soccer team are allocated to its teams by the Canadian Soccer Association. It is considered a Division 1 women's league in the United States soccer league system.

===== United Women's Soccer =====
Two Canadian teams (Calgary Foothills WFC and SASA Impact FC) play in the United Women's Soccer. It is considered a Division 2 women's league in the United States soccer league system.

=== Youth ===
Youth National Championships
Competition	Host city	Boys champion	Girls champion
U–15 Cup	Charlottetown, PEI	(Quebec) CS Longueuil	(Manitoba) Winnipeg 1v1 Futbol
U–17 Cup	Surrey, British Columbia	(Quebec) CS Saint-Laurent	(Quebec) Union Lanaudière
