= 2023 in Canadian soccer =

Soccer in Canada
- Season: 2023

Men's soccer
- CPL championship: Forge FC
- CPL Shield: Cavalry FC
- MLS Cup: (United States) Columbus Crew (Note: Vancouver Whitecaps FC was the best Canadian club in the MLS Cup Playoffs.)
- Supporters' Shield: (United States) FC Cincinnati (Note: Vancouver Whitecaps FC was the best Canadian club in the Supporters' Shield standings.)
- League1 Ontario: Simcoe County Rovers FC
- Ligue1 Québec: CS Saint-Laurent
- League1 BC: Whitecaps FC Academy
- Canadian Championship: Vancouver Whitecaps FC
- Challenge Trophy: West Ottawa Warriors

Women's soccer
- League1 Ontario: Alliance United FC
- Ligue1 Québec: PEF Québec
- League1 BC: Whitecaps FC Girls Elite
- Inter-provincial Championship: Whitecaps FC Girls Elite

The following are events related to Canadian soccer in the year 2023.

== National teams ==
=== Men's ===
==== Senior ====
As of October 13, 2023:

| Wins | Losses | Draws |
|---|---|---|
| 4 | 2 | 3 |

===== Friendlies =====
| October 13 | Japan | 4–1 | Canada | Niigata, Japan |
| 19:35 JST (UTC+09:00) | Tanaka 2', 49'; Davies 40' (o.g.); Nakamura 42' | Report | Hoilett 89' | Stadium: Denka Big Swan Stadium; Attendance: 37,125; Referee: Alex King (Australia) |

===== 2022–23 CONCACAF Nations League =====
====== Group C ======
| Pos | Team | Pld | W | D | L | GF | GA | GD | Pts | Qualification | (Canada) | (Honduras) | (Curaçao) |
|---|---|---|---|---|---|---|---|---|---|---|---|---|---|
| 1 | Canada | 4 | 3 | 0 | 1 | 11 | 3 | +8 | 9 | Qualification for Finals and Gold Cup | — | 4–1 | 4–0 |
| 2 | Honduras | 4 | 2 | 0 | 2 | 5 | 7 | −2 | 6 | Qualification for Gold Cup | 2–1 | — | 1–2 |
| 3 | Curaçao | 4 | 1 | 0 | 3 | 2 | 8 | −6 | 3 | Advance to Gold Cup prelims | 0–2 | 0–1 | — |

Source: CONCACAF

| March 25 | Curaçao | 0–2 | Canada | Willemstad, Curaçao |
| 21:00 AST (UTC−04:00) | | Report | David 23'; Larin 43' | Stadium: Ergilio Hato Stadium; Referee: Juan Gabriel Calderón (Costa Rica) |

| March 28 | Canada | 4–1 | Honduras | Toronto, Ontario |
| 20:00 EDT (UTC−04:00) | Larin 9', 12'; David 50'; Osorio 80' | Report | Benguché 73' | Stadium: BMO Field; Attendance: 13,626; Referee: Iván Barton (El Salvador) |

====== Finals ======
| June 15 SF | Panama | 0–2 | Canada | Paradise, United States |
| 16:00 PDT (UTC−07:00) | | Report | David 25'; Davies 70' | Stadium: Allegiant Stadium; Attendance: 65,000; Referee: Juan Gabriel Calderón (Costa Rica) |

| June 18 F | Canada | 0–2 | United States | Paradise, United States |
| 17:30 PDT (UTC−07:00) | | Report | Richards 12'; Balogun 34' | Stadium: Allegiant Stadium; Attendance: 35,000; Referee: Saíd Martínez (Honduras) |

Source: CONCACAF

===== 2023–24 CONCACAF Nations League =====
====== Quarter-finals ======
| Team 1 | Agg. | Team 2 | 1st leg | 2nd leg |
|---|---|---|---|---|
| Jamaica | 4–4 (a) | Canada | 1–2 | 3–2 |

| November 18 QF 1st Leg | Jamaica | 1–2 | Canada | Kingston, Jamaica |
| | Nicholson 56' | Report | David 45+1'; Eustáquio 86' | Stadium: Independence Park; Referee: Tori Penso (United States) |

| November 21 QF 2nd Leg | Canada | 2–3 (4–4 agg.) | Jamaica | Toronto, Ontario |
| 19:30 EDT (UTC−04:00) | Davies 25'; Koné 69' | Report | Nicholson 63', 66'; De Cordova-Reid 78' (pen.) | Stadium: BMO Field; Referee: César Ramos (Mexico) |
Note: Tied 4–4 on aggregate. Jamaica won on away goals, advanced to the Finals and qualified for the 2024 Copa América. Canada advanced to the play-in.

===== Gold Cup =====
====== Group D ======
| Pos | Team | Pld | W | D | L | GF | GA | GD | Pts | Qualification |
|---|---|---|---|---|---|---|---|---|---|---|
| 1 | Guatemala | 3 | 2 | 1 | 0 | 4 | 2 | +2 | 7 | Advance to knockout stage |
| 2 | Canada (H) | 3 | 1 | 2 | 0 | 6 | 4 | +2 | 5 | Advance to knockout stage |
| 3 | Guadeloupe | 3 | 1 | 1 | 1 | 8 | 6 | +2 | 4 | |
| 4 | Cuba | 3 | 0 | 0 | 3 | 3 | 9 | −6 | 0 | |

Source: CONCACAF
Rules for classification: Tiebreakers
(H) Co-host

| June 27 | Canada | 2–2 | Guadeloupe | Toronto, Ontario |
| 19:00 EDT (UTC−04:00) | Cavallini 49'; Lina 70' (o.g.) | Report | Ambrose 23'; Russell-Rowe 90+3' (o.g.) | Stadium: BMO Field; Attendance: 15,301; Referee: Rubiel Vazquez (United States) |

| July 1 | Guatemala | 0–0 | Canada | Houston, United States |
| 20:30 CDT (UTC−05:00) | | Report | | Stadium: Shell Energy Stadium; Attendance: 19,766; Referee: Marco Ortiz (Mexico) |

| July 4 | Canada | 4–2 | Cuba | Houston, United States |
| 17:30 CDT (UTC−05:00) | Hoilett 21' (pen.); Osorio 27'; Nelson 47'; Millar 62' | Report | Paradela 45+4' (pen.); Reyes 89' (pen.) | Stadium: Shell Energy Stadium; Referee: Keylor Herrera (Costa Rica) |

====== Knock out ======
| July 9 QF | United States | 2–2 (a.e.t.) (3–2 p) | Canada | Cincinnati, United States |
| 19:30 EDT (UTC−04:00) | Vázquez 88'; Kennedy 114' (o.g.) | Report | Vitória 90+3' (pen.); Shaffelburg 109' | Stadium: TQL Stadium; Attendance: 24,979; Referee: Marco Ortiz (Mexico) |
| | Penalties |
| | Vázquez (penalty missed); Cowell (penalty scored); Busio (penalty scored); Ferreira (penalty scored) | | (penalty missed) Vitória; (penalty missed) Fraser; (penalty scored) Miller; (penalty scored) Russell-Rowe; (penalty missed) Brym |

==== U-17 ====
As of February 24, 2023.

| Wins | Losses | Draws |
|---|---|---|
| 4 | 2 | 0 |

===== Friendlies =====
| September 29 | Brazil | 3–1 | Canada | Sorocaba, Brazil |
| | | | | Stadium: Estádio Municipal Walter Ribeiro |

| October 1 | Brazil | 5–0 | Canada | Sorocaba, Brazil |
| | | | | Stadium: Estádio Municipal Walter Ribeiro |

===== 2023 CONCACAF U-17 Championship =====
====== Group F ======
| Pos | Team | Pld | W | D | L | GF | GA | GD | Pts | Qualification |
|---|---|---|---|---|---|---|---|---|---|---|
| 1 | United States | 3 | 3 | 0 | 0 | 9 | 1 | +8 | 9 | Round of 16 |
| 2 | Canada | 3 | 2 | 0 | 1 | 5 | 3 | +2 | 6 | Round of 16 |
| 3 | Trinidad and Tobago | 3 | 0 | 1 | 2 | 4 | 7 | −3 | 1 | Round of 16 |
| 4 | Barbados | 3 | 0 | 1 | 2 | 1 | 8 | −7 | 1 | |

Source: CONCACAF
Rules for classification: Tie-breakers

| February 11 | Canada | 3–2 | Trinidad and Tobago | Antigua Guatemala, Guatemala |
| | Vojvodic 27', 68'; Omeze 61' | Report | Webb 67'; Sween 81' | Stadium: Estadio Pensativo; Referee: José Fuentes (Guatemala) |

| February 13 | Barbados | 0–2 | Canada | Antigua Guatemala, Guatemala |
| | | Report | MacKenzie 21'; Biello 28' (pen.) | Stadium: Estadio Pensativo; Referee: Sanchez Bass (Saint Kitts and Nevis) |

| February 15 | United States | 1–0 | Canada | Antigua Guatemala, Guatemala |
| | Figueroa 64' | Report | | Stadium: Estadio Pensativo; Referee: Fernando Morón (Panama) |

====== Knockout stage ======
| February 18 R16 | Canada | 3–0 | Haiti | Antigua Guatemala, Guatemala |
| 20:00 ET | N’Diaye 4'; Ozimec 16'; Pop 88' | Report | | Stadium: Estadio Pensativo; Referee: Víctor Cáceres (Mexico) |

| February 22 QF | Puerto Rico | 0–3 | Canada | Guatemala City, Guatemala |
| 17:00 ET | | Report | Vojvodic 8'; N’Diaye 36'; Stefanovic 55' | Stadium: Estadio Doroteo Guamuch Flores; Referee: Kwinsi Williams (Trinidad and Tobago) |

| February 24 SF | Canada | 0–2 | United States | Guatemala City, Guatemala |
| 20:00 ET | | Report | Burton 36'; Figueroa 90+4' | Stadium: Estadio Doroteo Guamuch Flores; Referee: Christopher Mason (Jamaica) |

===== 2023 FIFA U-17 World Cup =====
The 2023 FIFA U-17 World Cup will be hosted by Indonesia. Canada qualified for the tournament on February 22, 2023 by defeating Puerto Rico in the quarter-finals of the 2023 CONCACAF U-17 Championship. On September 15, 2023, Canada were drawn into Group B with Spain, Mali, and Uzbekistan.

====== Group B ======
| Pos | Team | Pld | W | D | L | GF | GA | GD | Pts | Qualification |
|---|---|---|---|---|---|---|---|---|---|---|
| 1 | Spain | 3 | 2 | 1 | 0 | 5 | 2 | +3 | 7 | Knockout stage |
| 2 | Mali | 3 | 2 | 0 | 1 | 8 | 2 | +6 | 6 | Knockout stage |
| 3 | Uzbekistan | 3 | 1 | 1 | 1 | 5 | 5 | 0 | 4 | Knockout stage |
| 4 | Canada | 3 | 0 | 0 | 3 | 1 | 10 | −9 | 0 | |

Source: FIFA

| November 10 | Spain | 2–0 | Canada | Surakarta, Indonesia |
| 7:00 ET | Guiu 21'; Junyent 76' | Report | | Stadium: Manahan Stadium; Attendance: 6,613; Referee: Roberto Pérez (Peru) |

| November 13 | Uzbekistan | 3–0 | Canada | Surakarta, Indonesia |
| 7:00 ET | Chukwu 22' (o.g.); Saidov 24', 81' | Report | | Stadium: Manahan Stadium; Attendance: 6,919; Referee: Ivo Méndez (Bolivia) |

| November 16 | Canada | 1–5 | Mali | Surabaya, Indonesia |
| 4:00 ET | Chukwu 45' | Report | I. Diarra 14'; Barry 26'; Kanaté 73'; Makalou 77'; Thiero 90+1' | Stadium: Gelora Bung Tomo Stadium; Referee: Espen Eskås (Norway) |

=== Women's ===
==== Senior ====
As of December 31, 2023.

| Wins | Losses | Draws |
|---|---|---|
| 7 | 5 | 1 |

===== Friendlies =====
| April 11 | France | 2–1 | Canada | Le Mans, France |
| | Geyoro 51'; Le Garrec 64' | Report | Huitema 71' | Stadium: Stade Marie-Marvingt; Attendance: 14,200; Referee: Sandra Bastos |

| October 28 | Canada | 0–1 | Brazil | Montréal, Quebec |
| 14:30 ET | | Report | Debinha 90+4' | Stadium: Stade Saputo |

| October 31 | Canada | 2–0 | Brazil | Halifax, Nova Scotia |
| 18:30 ET | | Report | | Stadium: Wanderers Grounds |

| December 1 | Canada | 5–0 | Australia | Langford, British Columbia |
| 19:30 PT | | Report | | Stadium: Starlight Stadium |

| December 5 | Canada | 1–0 | Australia | Vancouver, British Columbia |
| 19:00 PT | | Report | | Stadium: BC Place |

===== SheBelieves Cup =====
| Pos | Team | Pld | W | D | L | GF | GA | GD | Pts |
|---|---|---|---|---|---|---|---|---|---|
| 1st place, gold medalist(s) | United States (H, C) | 3 | 3 | 0 | 0 | 5 | 1 | +4 | 9 |
| 2nd place, silver medalist(s) | Japan | 3 | 1 | 0 | 2 | 3 | 2 | +1 | 3 |
| 3rd place, bronze medalist(s) | Brazil | 3 | 1 | 0 | 2 | 2 | 4 | −2 | 3 |
| 4 | Canada | 3 | 1 | 0 | 2 | 2 | 5 | −3 | 3 |

Source: Soccerway
Rules for classification: 1) points; 2) goal difference; 3) goals scored; 4) head-to-head result; 5) fair play ranking.
(C) Champions; (H) Hosts

| February 16 | United States | 2–0 | Canada | Orlando, United States |
| 19:00 ET | Swanson 7', 34' | Report | | Stadium: Exploria Stadium; Attendance: 14,697; Referee: Katia Garcia (Mexico) |

| February 19 | Brazil | 0–2 | Canada | Nashville, United States |
| 18:30 ET | | Report | Gilles 31'; Viens 71' | Stadium: Geodis Park; Attendance: 6,502; Referee: Ekaterina Koroleva (United States) |

| February 22 | Canada | 0–3 | Japan | Frisco, United States |
| 16:00 ET | | Report | Seike 26'; Hasegawa 41' (pen.); Endo 77' | Stadium: Toyota Stadium; Attendance: 6,975; Referee: Danielle Chesky (United States) |

===== 2023 FIFA Women's World Cup =====
====== Group B ======
| Pos | Team | Pld | W | D | L | GF | GA | GD | Pts | Qualification |
|---|---|---|---|---|---|---|---|---|---|---|
| 1 | Australia (H) | 3 | 2 | 0 | 1 | 7 | 3 | +4 | 6 | Advance to knockout stage |
| 2 | Nigeria | 3 | 1 | 2 | 0 | 3 | 2 | +1 | 5 | Advance to knockout stage |
| 3 | Canada | 3 | 1 | 1 | 1 | 2 | 5 | −3 | 4 | |
| 4 | Republic of Ireland | 3 | 0 | 1 | 2 | 1 | 3 | −2 | 1 | |

Source: FIFA
(H) Hosts

| July 20 | Nigeria | 0–0 | Canada | Melbourne, Australia |
| 22:30 ET | | Report | | Stadium: Melbourne Rectangular Stadium; Attendance: 21,410; Referee: Lina Lehtovaara (Finland) |

| July 26 | Canada | 2–1 | Republic of Ireland | Perth, Australia |
| 8:00 ET | Connolly 45+5' (o.g.); Leon 53' | Report | McCabe 4' | Stadium: Perth Rectangular Stadium; Attendance: 17,065; Referee: Laura Fortunato (Argentina) |

| July 31 | Canada | 0–4 | Australia | Melbourne, Australia |
| 6:00 ET | | Report | Raso 9', 39'; Fowler 58'; Catley 90+4' (pen.) | Stadium: Melbourne Rectangular Stadium; Attendance: 27,706; Referee: Stéphanie Frappart (France) |

===== 2024 Summer Olympics – Women's qualification (CONCACAF play-off) =====
| September 22 1st Leg | Jamaica | 0–2 | Canada | Kingston, Jamaica |
| 8:00 PM | | Report | Prince 18'; Leon 90+3' | Stadium: Independence Park; Attendance: 9,000; Referee: Katja Koroleva (United States) |

| September 26 2nd Leg | Canada | 2–1 (4–1 agg.) | Jamaica | Toronto, Ontario |
| | Lacasse 40'; Huitema 50' | Report | Spence 33' | Stadium: BMO Field; Attendance: 29,212; Referee: Katia Itzel García (Mexico) |

==== U–20 ====
===== CONCACAF Women's U-20 Championship qualification =====
====== Group A ======
| Pos | Team | Pld | W | D | L | GF | GA | GD | Pts | Qualification |
|---|---|---|---|---|---|---|---|---|---|---|
| 1 | Canada | 4 | 4 | 0 | 0 | 40 | 1 | +39 | 12 | Qualification to Final tournament |
| 2 | El Salvador | 4 | 3 | 0 | 1 | 16 | 11 | +5 | 9 | |
| 3 | Cuba | 4 | 2 | 0 | 2 | 6 | 6 | 0 | 6 | |
| 4 | Martinique | 4 | 0 | 1 | 3 | 2 | 21 | −19 | 1 | |
| 5 | Saint Vincent and the Grenadines | 4 | 0 | 1 | 3 | 1 | 26 | −25 | 1 | |
| 6 | U.S. Virgin Islands | 0 | 0 | 0 | 0 | 0 | 0 | 0 | 0 | Withdrew |

Source: CONCACAF
Rules for classification: Tiebreakers

| April 14 | Canada | 15–0 | Martinique | San Cristóbal, Dominican Republic |
| | Mouratidis 4'; Jourde 6'; Ottey 11'; Hernandez-Gray 21'; Markesini 35'; Maalouf 37'; Perrault 40'; Chukwu 45', 54'; Smith 50', 65'; Rose 64', 68', 76' (pen.) | Report | | Stadium: Estadio Panamericano |

| April 16 | Saint Vincent and the Grenadines | 0–12 | Canada | San Cristóbal, Dominican Republic |
| | | | Smith 20' (pen.), 25' (pen.), 45+1'; Rose 31'; Briggs 38'; Collin 55'; Maalouf 56', 89'; Chukwu 70'; Hernandez-Gray 72'; McBride 81', 87' | Stadium: Estadio Panamericano; Referee: Shandor Wilkinson (Saint Kitts and Nevis) |

| April 20 | Cuba | 0–4 | Canada | San Cristóbal, Dominican Republic |
| | | | Jourde 12', 44'; Briggs 67', 81' | Stadium: Estadio Panamericano; Referee: Kedeen Foster (Cayman Islands) |

| April 22 | Canada | 9–1 | El Salvador | San Cristóbal, Dominican Republic |
| | Jourde 8'; Smith 14', 19' (pen.); Chukwu 43', 47'; Allen 55', 73'; Briggs 85', 87' | | Johannes 34' | Stadium: Estadio Panamericano; Referee: Karitza Guerra (Honduras) |

===== CONCACAF Women's U-20 Championship =====
====== Group A ======
| Pos | Team | Pld | W | D | L | GF | GA | GD | Pts | Qualification |
|---|---|---|---|---|---|---|---|---|---|---|
| 1 | United States | 3 | 3 | 0 | 0 | 15 | 2 | +13 | 9 | Knockout stage |
| 2 | Canada | 3 | 2 | 0 | 1 | 11 | 5 | +6 | 6 | Knockout stage |
| 3 | Jamaica | 3 | 1 | 0 | 2 | 4 | 9 | −5 | 3 | |
| 4 | Panama | 3 | 0 | 0 | 3 | 1 | 15 | −14 | 0 | |

Source: CONCACAF
Rules for classification: Group stage tiebreakers

| May 26 | Canada | 4–0 | Jamaica | Santo Domingo, Dominican Republic |
| | Chukwu 39', 45'; Smith 56'; Watson 90+4' | Report | | Stadium: Félix Sánchez Olympic Stadium; Referee: Marianela Araya (Costa Rica) |

| May 28 | Panama | 0–5 | Canada | Santo Domingo, Dominican Republic |
| | | Report | Markesini 22'; Garay 25' (o.g.); Smith 29', 41'; Allen 51' | Stadium: Félix Sánchez Olympic Stadium; Referee: Sandra Benítez (El Salvador) |

| May 30 | United States | 5–2 | Canada | Santo Domingo, Dominican Republic |
| | Dahlien 3'; Sentnor 11', 55'; Thompson 45+1' (pen.); Gamero 61' | Report | Allen 54' (pen.); Rose 67' | Stadium: Félix Sánchez Olympic Stadium; Referee: Katia García (Mexico) |

====== Knockout stage ======
| June 2 SF | Mexico | 2–1 | Canada | Santo Domingo, Dominican Republic |
| | M. Orozco 77'; A. Soto 90' | Report | K. Briggs 65' | Stadium: Félix Sánchez Olympic Stadium; Referee: Astrid Gramajo (Guatemala) |

| June 4 3rd | Canada | 5–3 (a.e.t.) | Costa Rica | Santo Domingo, Dominican Republic |
| | Ottey 16'; Jourde 27'; Smith 75'; Chukwu 101', 120+1' | Report | Solano 24'; Scott 45+1'; Briceño 45+6' | Stadium: Félix Sánchez Olympic Stadium; Referee: Odette Hamilton (Jamaica) |

== Club competitions ==
=== Men's ===
==== Domestic leagues ====
===== Canadian Premier League =====
====== Regular season ======
| Pos | Team | Pld | W | D | L | GF | GA | GD | Pts | Playoff qualification |
|---|---|---|---|---|---|---|---|---|---|---|
| 1 | Cavalry (S) | 28 | 16 | 7 | 5 | 46 | 27 | +19 | 55 | First semifinal |
| 2 | Forge (C) | 28 | 11 | 9 | 8 | 39 | 32 | +7 | 42 (Note: Tie resolved by away goal differential; Forge: +4, Wanderers: −2) | First semifinal |
| 3 | HFX Wanderers | 28 | 11 | 9 | 8 | 39 | 32 | +7 | 42 | Quarterfinal |
| 4 | Pacific | 28 | 11 | 7 | 10 | 42 | 35 | +7 | 40 | Play-in round |
| 5 | York United | 28 | 11 | 5 | 12 | 35 | 44 | −9 | 38 | Play-in round |
| 6 | Atlético Ottawa | 28 | 10 | 6 | 12 | 38 | 34 | +4 | 36 | |
| 7 | Vancouver | 28 | 8 | 5 | 15 | 28 | 50 | −22 | 29 | |
| 8 | Valour | 28 | 6 | 8 | 14 | 25 | 38 | −13 | 26 | |

Source: CanPL
Rules for classification: 1) Points; 2) Total wins; 3) Goal difference; 4) Goals scored; 5) Away goal differential; 6) Away goals scored; 7) Home goal differential; 8) Home goals scored; 9) Total minutes played by U-21 players; 10) Coin toss (2 teams tied) or drawing of lots (3+ teams tied).
(C) Champion (qualified to Champions Cup); (S) CPL Shield winner (qualified to Champions Cup)

====== Playoffs ======
Bracket

Play-in round
October 11
4 | Pacific FC | 1
5 | York United FC | 0

First semifinal
October 14
1 | Cavalry FC | 1
2 | Forge FC | 2
Quarterfinal
October 14
3 | HFX Wanderers FC | 0
4 | Pacific FC | 1

Second semifinal
October 21
1 | Cavalry FC | 2
4 | Pacific FC | 1

Final
October 28
2 | Forge FC | 2
1 | Cavalry FC | 1

Final

October 28, 2023
6:00 pm ET

| Forge FC | 2–1 (a.e.t.) | Cavalry FC |
|---|---|---|
| Badibanga 105+2'; Borges 111' | Recap; Report | Musse 101' |

Tim Hortons Field, Hamilton, Ontario
Attendance: 13,925
Referee: Marie-Soleil Beaudoin

===== League1 Canada =====
| League | Playoff champion | Playoff runner-up | Regular season winner | Regular season runner-up |
|---|---|---|---|---|
| British Columbia | Whitecaps FC Academy | Victoria Highlanders FC | Victoria Highlanders FC | TSS FC Rovers |
| Ontario | Simcoe County Rovers FC | Scrosoppi FC | Scrosoppi FC | Simcoe County Rovers FC |
| Quebec | N/A (league championship decided by regular season) | | CS Saint-Laurent | Royal-Sélect de Beauport |

===== Canadian Soccer League =====
| Regular season winner | Regular season runner-up |
|---|---|
| Scarborough SC | Serbian White Eagles |

==== Domestic cups ====
===== Canadian Championship =====
====== Bracket ======
Preliminary round April 18–20
Langford, BC
CPL | Pacific FC (p) | 1 (5)
CPL | Cavalry FC | 1 (3)
Burnaby, BC
L1BC | TSS FC Rovers | 3
CPL | Valour FC | 1
Toronto (York Lions), ON
CPL | York United FC | 1
CPL | Vancouver FC | 0
Montreal, QC
MLS | CF Montréal | 2
L1O | Vaughan Azzurri | 0
Hamilton, ON
CPL | Forge FC | 3
PLSQ | FC Laval | 0
Toronto (York Lions), ON
CPL | HFX Wanderers FC | 1
CPL | Atlético Ottawa | 3

Quarter-finals; May 9–10
Langford, BC
CPL | Pacific FC | 2
L1BC | TSS FC Rovers | 0
Toronto (York Lions), ON
CPL | York United FC | 1
MLS | Vancouver Whitecaps FC | 4
Toronto (BMO), ON
MLS | Toronto FC | 1
MLS | CF Montréal | 2
Hamilton, ON
CPL | Forge FC (p) | 1 (3)
CPL | Atlético Ottawa | 1 (2)

Semi-finals; May 24
Langford, BC
CPL | Pacific FC | 0
MLS | Vancouver Whitecaps FC | 3
Montreal, QC
MLS | CF Montréal | 2
CPL | Forge FC | 0

Final; June 7
Vancouver, BC
MLS | Vancouver Whitecaps FC | 2
MLS | CF Montréal | 1

====== Final ======
June 7, 2023
7:00 pm PDT

| Vancouver Whitecaps FC | 2–1 | CF Montréal |
|---|---|---|
| White 57'; Gauld 65' (pen.) | Report | Ibrahim 83' |

BC Place, Vancouver, British Columbia
Attendance: 20,072
Referee: Filip Dujic

===== Challenge Trophy =====
Group A
| Pos | Team | Pld | Pts |
|---|---|---|---|
| 1 | (Ontario Soccer Association) West Ottawa Warriors | 4 | 9 |
| 2 | (Soccer Quebec) Rapides de Chaudière-Ouest | 4 | 9 |
| 3 | (British Columbia Soccer Association) Surrey BB5 United | 4 | 6 |
| 4 | (Manitoba Soccer Association) FC Winnipeg Lions | 4 | 6 |
| 5 | (Soccer New Brunswick) Fredericton Picaroons Reds | 4 | 0 |

Source: Canada Soccer

Group B
| Pos | Team | Pld | Pts |
|---|---|---|---|
| 1 | (Soccer Nova Scotia) Western Halifax FC (H) | 4 | 10 |
| 2 | (Soccer Nova Scotia) Suburban FC of Fall River (H) | 4 | 7 |
| 3 | (Alberta Soccer Association) Edmonton Scottish | 4 | 7 |
| 4 | (Newfoundland and Labrador Soccer Association) Feildians AA of St. John's | 4 | 4 |
| 5 | (PEI Soccer Association) Winsloe-Charlottetown Royals | 4 | 0 |

Source: Canada Soccer
(H) Hosts

Final

| Team 1 | Score | Team 2 |
|---|---|---|
| West Ottawa Warriors (Ontario) | 1–0 | (Nova Scotia) Western Halifax FC |

==== USSF domestic leagues ====
===== Major League Soccer =====
====== Regular season ======
Overall MLS standings table
| Pos | Team | Pld | W | L | T | GF | GA | GD | Pts | Qualification |
|---|---|---|---|---|---|---|---|---|---|---|
| 1 | FC Cincinnati (S) | 34 | 20 | 5 | 9 | 57 | 39 | +18 | 69 | Qualification for the CONCACAF Champions Cup round one (Note: As 2023 MLS Supporters' Shield champions) |
| 2 | Orlando City SC | 34 | 18 | 7 | 9 | 55 | 39 | +16 | 63 | Qualification for the CONCACAF Champions Cup round one (Note: As highest-ranked club in 2023 MLS Supporters' Shield not already qualified) |
| 3 | Columbus Crew (C) | 34 | 16 | 9 | 9 | 67 | 46 | +21 | 57 | Qualification for the CONCACAF Champions Cup round of 16 (Note: As MLS Cup 2023 champions) |
| 4 | St. Louis City SC | 34 | 17 | 12 | 5 | 62 | 45 | +17 | 56 | Qualification for the CONCACAF Champions Cup round one (Note: As 2023 Western Conference regular season champions) |
| 5 | Philadelphia Union | 34 | 15 | 9 | 10 | 57 | 41 | +16 | 55 | Qualification for the CONCACAF Champions Cup round one (Note: As 2023 Leagues Cup third place) |
| 6 | New England Revolution | 34 | 15 | 9 | 10 | 58 | 46 | +12 | 55 | Qualification for the CONCACAF Champions Cup round one (Note: As second highest-ranked club in 2023 MLS Supporters' Shield not already qualified) |
| 7 | Seattle Sounders FC | 34 | 14 | 9 | 11 | 41 | 32 | +9 | 53 | Qualification for the U.S. Open Cup round of 32 (Note: As one of the top seven teams in the overall table to not qualify for the 2024 CONCACAF Champions Cup) |
| 8 | Los Angeles FC | 34 | 14 | 10 | 10 | 54 | 39 | +15 | 52 | Qualification for the U.S. Open Cup round of 32 |
| 9 | Houston Dynamo FC (U) | 34 | 14 | 11 | 9 | 51 | 38 | +13 | 51 | Qualification for the CONCACAF Champions Cup round one and the U.S. Open Cup round of 32 (Note: Qualified for both the Champions Cup and U.S. Open Cup as 2023 U.S. Open Cup champions) |
| 10 | Atlanta United FC | 34 | 13 | 9 | 12 | 66 | 53 | +13 | 51 | Qualification for the U.S. Open Cup round of 32 |
| 11 | Real Salt Lake | 34 | 14 | 12 | 8 | 48 | 50 | −2 | 50 | Qualification for the U.S. Open Cup round of 32 |
| 12 | Nashville SC | 34 | 13 | 11 | 10 | 39 | 32 | +7 | 49 | Qualification for the CONCACAF Champions Cup round one (Note: As 2023 Leagues Cup runners-up) |
| 13 | Vancouver Whitecaps FC (V) | 34 | 12 | 10 | 12 | 55 | 48 | +7 | 48 | Qualification for the CONCACAF Champions Cup round one (Note: As 2023 Canadian Championship winners) |
| 14 | FC Dallas | 34 | 11 | 10 | 13 | 41 | 37 | +4 | 46 | Qualification for the U.S. Open Cup round of 32 |
| 15 | Sporting Kansas City | 34 | 12 | 14 | 8 | 48 | 51 | −3 | 44 | Qualification for the U.S. Open Cup round of 32 |
| 16 | San Jose Earthquakes | 34 | 10 | 10 | 14 | 39 | 43 | −4 | 44 | Qualification for the U.S. Open Cup round of 32 |
| 17 | New York Red Bulls | 34 | 11 | 13 | 10 | 36 | 39 | −3 | 43 | |
| 18 | Portland Timbers | 34 | 11 | 13 | 10 | 46 | 58 | −12 | 43 | |
| 19 | Charlotte FC | 34 | 10 | 11 | 13 | 45 | 52 | −7 | 43 | |
| 20 | CF Montréal | 34 | 12 | 17 | 5 | 36 | 52 | −16 | 41 | |
| 21 | Minnesota United FC | 34 | 10 | 13 | 11 | 46 | 51 | −5 | 41 | |
| 22 | New York City FC | 34 | 9 | 11 | 14 | 35 | 39 | −4 | 41 | |
| 23 | D.C. United | 34 | 10 | 14 | 10 | 45 | 49 | −4 | 40 | |
| 24 | Chicago Fire FC | 34 | 10 | 14 | 10 | 39 | 51 | −12 | 40 | |
| 25 | Austin FC | 34 | 10 | 15 | 9 | 49 | 55 | −6 | 39 | |
| 26 | LA Galaxy | 34 | 8 | 14 | 12 | 51 | 67 | −16 | 36 | |
| 27 | Inter Miami CF (L) | 34 | 9 | 18 | 7 | 41 | 54 | −13 | 34 | Qualification for the CONCACAF Champions Cup round of 16 (Note: As 2023 Leagues Cup champions) |
| 28 | Colorado Rapids | 34 | 5 | 17 | 12 | 26 | 54 | −28 | 27 | |
| 29 | Toronto FC | 34 | 4 | 20 | 10 | 26 | 59 | −33 | 22 | |

Source: MLS
Rules for classification: 1) points; 2) total wins; 3) total goal differential; 4) total goals scored; 5) fewer disciplinary points; 6) away goal differential; 7) away goals scored; 8) home goals differential; 9) home goals scored; 10) coin toss (2 clubs tied) or drawing of lots (≥3 clubs tied)
(C) MLS Cup champion; (L) Leagues Cup winner; (S) Supporters' Shield winner; (U) U.S. Open Cup winner; (V) Canadian Championship winner

==== Round One ====
| Team 1 | Series | Team 2 | Game 1 | Game 2 | Game 3 |
|---|---|---|---|---|---|
| Los Angeles FC | 2–0 | Vancouver Whitecaps FC | 5–2 | 1–0 | — |

==== International leagues/cups ====
===== CONCACAF Champions League =====
====== Round of 16 ======
| Team 1 | Agg. | Team 2 | 1st leg | 2nd leg |
|---|---|---|---|---|
| Vancouver Whitecaps FC (Canada) | 7–3 (Note: Order of legs were reversed after original draw) | (Honduras) Real España | 5–0 | 2–3 |

====== Quarter-finals ======
| Team 1 | Agg. | Team 2 | 1st leg | 2nd leg |
|---|---|---|---|---|
| Vancouver Whitecaps FC (Canada) | 0–6 | (United States) Los Angeles FC | 0–3 | 0–3 |

===== Leagues Cup =====
====== Group stage ======
West 3
| Pos | Team | Pld | Pts | LEO | VAN | LAX |
|---|---|---|---|---|---|---|
| 1 | (Mexico) León | 2 | 5 | — | — | — |
| 2 | (Canada) Vancouver Whitecaps FC | 2 | 4 | 2–2 | — | — |
| 3 | (United States) LA Galaxy | 2 | 0 | 0–1 | 1–2 | — |

Source: Leagues Cup

East 2
| Pos | Team | Pld | Pts | UNM | DCU | MTL |
|---|---|---|---|---|---|---|
| 1 | (Mexico) Pumas UNAM | 2 | 4 | — | 3–0 | — |
| 2 | (United States) D.C. United | 2 | 3 | — | — | — |
| 3 | (Canada) CF Montréal | 2 | 2 | 2–2 | 0–1 | — |

Source: Leagues Cup

East 3
| Pos | Team | Pld | Pts | ATL | NYC | TOR |
|---|---|---|---|---|---|---|
| 1 | (Mexico) Atlas | 2 | 6 | — | — | 1–0 |
| 2 | (United States) New York City FC | 2 | 3 | 0–1 | — | 5–0 |
| 3 | (Canada) Toronto FC | 2 | 0 | — | — | — |

Source: Leagues Cup

====== Knockout stage ======
Round of 32

| Team 1 | Score | Team 2 |
|---|---|---|
| UANL (Mexico) | 1–1 (5–3 p) | (Canada) Vancouver Whitecaps FC |

=== Women's ===
==== Domestic leagues ====
===== League1 Canada =====
| League | Playoff champion | Playoff runner-up | Regular season winner | Regular season runner-up |
|---|---|---|---|---|
| British Columbia | Whitecaps FC Girls Elite | Unity FC | Whitecaps FC Girls Elite | Nautsa’mawt FC |
| Ontario | Alliance United FC | NDC Ontario | NDC Ontario | Vaughan Azzurri |
| Quebec | N/A (league championship decided by regular season) | | PEF Québec | Rapides de Chaudière-Ouest |

==== Domestic cups ====
===== L1C Inter-provincial Championship =====
Semifinals
(Quebec) PEF Québec | 6
(British Columbia) Unity FC | 4
(Ontario) Alliance United FC | 1
(British Columbia) Whitecaps FC Girls Elite | 2

Championship Game
(Quebec) PEF Québec | 0
(British Columbia) Whitecaps FC Girls Elite | 5
Third place
(Ontario) Alliance United FC | 0
(British Columbia) Unity FC | 2

=== Youth ===
Youth National Championships
| Competition | Host city | Boys champion | Girls champion |
|---|---|---|---|
| U–15 Cup | Waterloo, Ontario | (Alberta) Edmonton BTB SC | (Quebec) CS Longueuil |
| U–17 Cup | Moncton, New Brunswick | (British Columbia) Burnaby FC | (British Columbia) Burnaby FC |

== Furthur reading ==
- Davidson, Neil (December 18, 2023). "Canadian soccer endures a year of change, disruption and disappointment". TSN. The Canadian Press. Archived from the original on December 18, 2023.
