= 2022 League1 Canada season =

Soccer league season

League1 Canada
- Season: 2022

Men's soccer
- League1 BC: TSS FC Rovers
- League1 Ontario: Vaughan Azzurri
- PLSQ: FC Laval

Women's soccer
- League1 BC: Whitecaps FC Girls Elite Academy
- League1 Ontario: NDC Ontario
- PLSQ: A.S. Blainville
- Interprovincial Championship: A.S. Blainville

The 2022 League1 Canada season was the first edition of League1 Canada, the third division of men's and women's soccer in Canada. The 2022 season included regional leagues and playoffs, as well as the inaugural Women's Interprovincial Championship. A men's interprovincial tournament will not debut until the 2023 season.

== Men's competitions ==
=== Provincial leagues ===
League1 BC

Pos	Team	Pld	Pts
1	Varsity FC	12	28
2	TSS FC Rovers (C)	12	22
3	Whitecaps FC Academy	12	16
4	Altitude FC	12	14
5	Rivers FC	12	13
6	Unity FC	12	12
7	Victoria Highlanders FC	12	11

Source: Standings
(C) Champions
League1 Ontario

Pos	Team	Pld	Pts
1	Vaughan Azzurri (C)	21	57
2	Blue Devils FC	21	47
3	Alliance United FC	21	45
4	North Toronto Nitros	21	44
5	Simcoe County Rovers FC	21	44
6	ProStars FC	21	43
7	Guelph United F.C.	21	42
8	Hamilton United	21	31
9	Sigma FC	21	31
10	Electric City FC	21	30
11	Woodbridge Strikers	21	29
12	Scrosoppi FC	21	28
13	Darby FC	21	25
14	Pickering FC	21	23
15	BVB IA Waterloo	21	22
16	St. Catharines Roma Wolves	21	20
17	Burlington SC	21	19
18	Windsor TFC	21	18
19	Master's FA	21	17
20	Unionville Milliken SC	21	14
21	North Mississauga SC	21	14
22	FC London	21	10

Source: League1 Ontario
(C) Champions
See also: Reserve and U19 Reserve Divisions
Première ligue de soccer du Québec

Pos	Team	Pld	Pts
1	FC Laval (C)	22	53
2	CS Saint-Laurent	22	49
3	A.S. Blainville	22	44
4	CS Mont-Royal Outremont	22	41
5	CS Longueuil	22	38
6	CF Montréal U23	22	38
7	CS St-Hubert	22	28
8	Royal-Sélect de Beauport	22	26
9	AS Laval	22	25
10	Celtix du Haut-Richelieu	22	16
11	CS Lanaudière-Nord	22	12
12	Ottawa South United	22	5

Source: PLSQ
(C) Champions
See also: Reserve Division

=== Provincial playoffs ===
League1 BC Championship Final

Final
1	Varsity FC	1(4)
2	TSS FC Rovers	1(5)

League1 Ontario playoffs

Quarterfinals
4	North Toronto Nitros	0
5	Simcoe County Rovers FC	2
3	Alliance United FC	4
6	ProStars FC	0

Semifinals
1	Vaughan Azzurri	2
5	Simcoe County Rovers FC	1
2	Blue Devils FC	3
3	Alliance United FC	2

Finals
1	Vaughan Azzurri	5
2	Blue Devils FC	1

=== Provincial league cups ===
Coupe PLSQ

Semi-finals
1	FC Laval	2
4	CS Mont-Royal Outremont	1
2	CS Saint-Laurent	1
3	AS Blainville	2

Final
1	FC Laval	1
3	AS Blainville	3

== Women's competitions ==
=== Provincial leagues ===
League1 BC

Pos	Team	Pld	Pts
1	Varsity FC	12	33
2	Whitecaps FC Girls Elite Academy (C)	12	25
3	Unity FC	12	24
4	TSS FC Rovers	12	21
5	Victoria Highlanders FC	12	10
6	Altitude FC	12	5
7	Rivers FC	12	4

Source: Standings
(C) Champions
League1 Ontario

Pos	Team	Pld	Pts
1	Vaughan Azzurri	19	48
2	NDC Ontario (C)	19	46
3	Woodbridge Strikers	19	42
4	FC London	19	41
5	Simcoe County Rovers FC	19	41
6	Alliance United FC	19	37
7	North Toronto Nitros	19	36
8	Electric City FC	19	32
9	North Mississauga SC	19	28
10	Darby FC	18	27
11	St Catharines Roma Wolves	19	25
12	Tecumseh SC	19	25
13	Guelph Union	19	24
14	Unionville Milliken SC	18	22
15	Blue Devils FC	19	19
16	BVB IA Waterloo	19	15
17	Pickering FC	19	12
18	Hamilton United	19	10
19	ProStars FC	19	6
20	Burlington SC	19	3

Updated to match(es) played on August 7, 2022. Source: League1 Ontario
(C) Champions
See also: Reserve Division and Fall Reserve Division
Première ligue de soccer du Québec

Pos	Team	Pld	Pts
1	A.S. Blainville (C, L)	11	27
2	AS Laval	11	26
3	Rapides de Chaudière-Ouest	11	24
4	FC Laval	11	22
5	CS Mont-Royal Outremont	11	15
6	Pierrefonds FC	11	14
7	PEF Québec	11	14
8	Ottawa South United	11	13
9	CS Longueuil	11	13
10	Celtix du Haut-Richelieu	11	8
11	Royal-Sélect de Beauport	11	7
12	CS St-Hubert	11	4

Source: PLSQ
(C) Champions; (L) Coupe PLSQ winner

=== Provincial playoffs ===
League1 BC Championship Final

Finals
1	Varsity FC	1
2	Vancouver Whitecaps Girls Elite	2

League1 Ontario playoffs

Quarterfinals
3	Woodbridge Strikers	0
6	Alliance United	1
4	FC London	4
5	Simcoe County Rovers	3

Semifinals
1	Vaughan Azzurri	1
6	Alliance United	2
2	NDC Ontario	2
4	FC London	0

Finals
6	Alliance United	1
2	NDC Ontario	3

=== Provincial league cups ===
Coupe PLSQ

Semi-finals
1	A.S. Blainville	2 (4)
4	FC Laval	2 (3)
2	AS Laval	1
3	Rapides de Chaudière-Ouest	4

Final
1	A.S. Blainville	2
3	Rapides de Chaudière-Ouest	0

=== Inter-Provincial Championship ===
==== Details ====
Qualified teams
Team	Method
(British Columbia) Varsity FC	L1BC regular season winners (Note: Due to scheduling issues, ahead of the conclusion of the L1BC season, L1BC confirmed that Varsity FC would be the league representative, regardless of the playoff results of the season.)
(Ontario) Alliance United FC	L1O runner-up (Note: After the final it was announced that due to scheduling conflicts, champions NDC Ontario could not participate.)
(Quebec) A.S. Blainville	PLSQ champions
(Quebec) AS Laval	PLSQ runner-up

Host
Soccer Quebec
City	Stadium(s)	Capacity
Laval	Centre Sportif Bois-de-Boulogne	~1000

==== Bracket ====
Semifinals
L1BC	Varsity FC	0
PLSQ-1	A.S. Blainville	2
L1O	Alliance United FC	1 (5)
PLSQ-2	AS Laval	1 (6)

Championship Game
PLSQ-1	A.S. Blainville	3
PLSQ-2	AS Laval	0
Third place
L1BC	Varsity FC	2 (1)
L1O	Alliance United FC	2 (4)

==== Matches ====
Semi-finals

August 12	Alliance United FC (Ontario)	1–1 (5–6 p)	(Quebec) AS Laval	Laval, Quebec
4:00 PM	Badovinac 66'	Report	Feola 83'	Stadium: Centre Sportif Bois-de-Boulogne; Referee: Sheila Couture
	Penalties
	Penalty scored Penalty missed		(penalty scored) (penalty scored) (penalty scored) (penalty scored) (penalty scored) (penalty missed); (penalty scored) Santarossa

August 12	Varsity FC (British Columbia)	0–2	(Quebec) A.S. Blainville	Laval, Quebec
6:30 PM		Report	Bellerose 2'; Asselin 58'	Stadium: Centre Sportif Bois-de-Boulogne; Referee: Isabelle Duclo

Third place match

August 14	Varsity FC (British Columbia)	2–2 (1–4 p)	(Ontario) Alliance United FC	Laval, Quebec
11:30 a.m.	Baxter 13'; Tolnai 26'		Cheung 43'; Mariani 60'	Stadium: Centre Sportif Bois-de-Boulogne; Referee: Amanda Kwan
	Penalties
	Baxter (penalty scored); Davie (penalty missed); Ferreira (penalty missed)		(penalty scored) Cheung; (penalty scored) Mariani; (penalty scored) Whelan; (penalty scored) Chown

Final

August 14	A.S. Blainville (Quebec)	3–0	(Quebec) AS Laval	Laval, Quebec
1:30 PM	Sauvé 30'; Thibault 54'; Cardinal 55'			Stadium: Centre Sportif Bois-de-Boulogne; Referee: Myriam Marcotte
