= Mégane Sauvé =

Canadian soccer player (born 1998)

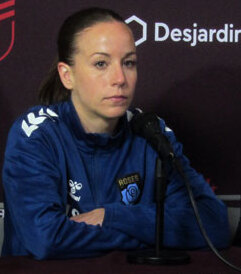
- Sauvé in 2025

Personal information
- Date of birth: April 6, 1998 (age 28)
- Place of birth: Saint-Hyacinthe, Quebec, Canada
- Height: 1.66 m (5 ft 5 in)
- Position: Defender

Team information
- Current team: Montreal Roses
- Number: 20

Youth career
- FC St-Hyacinthe
- 2016–2017: Lakeshore SC

College career
Years	Team	Apps	(Gls)
2018–2022	Montreal Carabins		

Senior career*
Years	Team	Apps	(Gls)
2018–2023	AS Blainville	41+	(20+)
2023–2024	Valadares Gaia	21	(1)
2024–2025	Sporting CP	5	(0)
2025–	Montreal Roses	25	(1)

International career
2019	Canada Universiade	5	(0)
- * Club domestic league appearances and goals as of October 20, 2025

Mégane Sauvé (born April 6, 1998) is a Canadian soccer player who plays for Montreal Roses FC in the Northern Super League.

== Early life ==
Sauvé played youth soccer with FC St-Hyacinthe until 2015, then joined Lakeshore SC. She also played ice hockey throughout her youth, before eventually committing to soccer.

== University career ==
In 2017, Sauvé began attending the Université de Montréal, where she played for the women's soccer team. In her first season, she won the national title and was named to the U Sports All-Rookie team and the RSEQ Second Team All-Star. In 2018, 2019, and 2021, she was named an RSEQ First Team All-Star and a U Sports First Team All-Star. In 2022, she won another national title was named the school's Athlete of the Year, an RSEQ First Team All-Star, a U Sports First Team All-Star, U SPORTS Championship All-Star Team and was named the tournament's Most Valuable Player, and was named the RSEQ Athlète par excellence.

== Club career ==
In 2018, Sauvé began playing with AS Blainville in the Première ligue de soccer du Québec. In 2018, she won the Ballon d'argent as the league's second best player. In 2021, she helped them win the league and cup double and was named the best player of the league cup. In 2022, she won the Ballon d'or as the league's league player. In 2023, she won the Ballon d'argent as the league's second best player.

In August 2023, she signed with Valadares Gaia in the Portuguese Campeonato Nacional Feminino. On April 13, 2024, she scored in a 1–0 victory over Albergaria, earning player of the match honours. During the season, she scored one goal and added one assist in 30 matches, across all competitions.

In July 2024, she signed with Sporting CP on a two-year contract. There had been interest from French clubs, however, she chose Sporting for the opportunity to play in the UEFA Women's Champions League. She suffered an injury in training in August, delaying her debut. On December 8, 2024, she scored her first goal for the club in a Taça de Portugal Feminina match against Guia. In January 2025, she departed the club to return to Canada.

In January 2025, she signed with Montreal Roses FC of the Northern Super League on a transfer for an undisclosed fee. She was named the team's co-captain for the inaugural season, alongside Tanya Boychuk. On July 18, 2025, she scored her first goal, in a 2-1 victory over AFC Toronto.

== International career ==
In 2019, she was named to the Canada Universiade team for the 2019 Summer Universiade.

== Career statistics ==
As of November 10, 2025

Appearances and goals by club, season and competition
Club	Season	League			Playoffs		National cup		League cup		Other		Total	
Club	Season	League	Apps	Goals	Apps	Goals	Apps	Goals	Apps	Goals	Apps	Goals	Apps	Goals
AS Blainville	2018	Première ligue de soccer du Québec	11	6	–		—		—		—		11	6
AS Blainville	2019	Première ligue de soccer du Québec	7	6	–		—		—		—		7	6
AS Blainville	2020	Première ligue de soccer du Québec	3	1	1	0	—		–		—		4	1
AS Blainville	2021	Première ligue de soccer du Québec	9	3	–		—		2	2	—		11	5
AS Blainville	2022	Première ligue de soccer du Québec	11	4	–		—		2	1	2	1	15	6
AS Blainville	2023	Ligue1 Québec	?	?	–		—		0	0	—		?	?
AS Blainville	Total		41+	20+	1	0	0	0	4	3	2	1	48+	24+
Valadares Gaia	2023–24	Campeonato Nacional Feminino	21	1	–		3	0	6	0	—		30	1
Sporting CP	2024–25	Campeonato Nacional Feminino	5	0	–		1	1	0	0	0	0	6	1
Montreal Roses	2025	Northern Super League	25	1	2	0	–		–		–		27	1
Career total			92+	22+	3	0	4	1	10	3	2	1	111+	27+

== Honours ==
AS Blainville

- PLSQ: 2020, 2021, 2022
- Coupe PLSQ: 2021, 2022
- Women's Inter-Provincial Championship: 2022

Sporting CP

- Supertaça de Portugal Feminina: 2024
