= LS Pro Féminin =

Semi-pro soccer league in Ontario, Canada

LS Pro
- Organising body: Soccer Quebec
- Founded: 2018
- First season: 2018
- Country: Canada
- Confederation: CONCACAF
- Number of clubs: 12
- Level on pyramid: 3
- League cup: Coupe de Québec
- Current champions: CS Mont-Royal Outremont (2025)
- Most championships: A.S. Blainville (3 titles)
- Most Couple PLSQs: A.S. Blainville (2 titles)
- Website: https://ligue1quebec.ca
- Current: 2026 LS Pro féminine season

The Ligues senior provinciales (LS Pro; formerly the Première ligue de soccer du Québec féminine) is a semi-professional soccer league created in 2018, organized by the Soccer Quebec, which operates at the pro-am tier of the Canadian soccer league system. In 2025, the league expanded and introduced two new divisions Ligue2 Québec and Ligue3 Québec, following the ending of the amateur Ligue de soccer élite du Québec, with the teams being folded into L1Q. The L1QC women's division is below the Northern Super League and equal to the Ontario Premier League, British Columbia Premier League, and Alberta Premier League.

== History ==
In 2011, the men's Première ligue de soccer du Québec was established to begin play in 2012, marking the return of a semi-professional soccer league to the province for the first time in 20 years.

In 2018, a women's division was added, starting with five teams: AS Blainville, Dynamo de Québec, FC Sélect Rive-Sud, CS Monteuil, and Lakers du Lac Saint-Louis. Dynamo de Québec won the first league championship.

Beginning in the 2020 season, League1 Ontario and the PLSQ had planned to hold a Final Four end-of-season tournament for their women's divisions, from August 14 to 16, pitting the top two sides from each league in an inter-provincial playoff. However, due to restrictions associated with the COVID-19 pandemic, League1 Ontario cancelled their 2020 season, cancelling this tournament indefinitely, although the PLSQ did manage to complete a delayed shortened season, although some teams did opt out of playing for the season. In 2021, the league introduced the Coupe PLSQ as the league cup tournament. AS Blainville won the inaugural Coupe PLSQ.

Over the course of its history, various clubs have joined and departed the league. AS Blainville is the only club to have participated in every season since the league's inception.

In 2022, the PLSQ joined League1 Canada along with League1 Ontario and League1 British Columbia (and later League1 Alberta), with the various leagues sending their champions to the year-end Women's Inter-Provincial Championship. On April 19, 2023, the league rebranded to Ligue1 Québec to align with its partner leagues.

== Competition format ==
The league typically runs from May to August with teams playing each other team 1-3 times (depending on the number of teams). In 2021, the league cup was introduced.

=== Yearly results ===
L1QC Women's trophy winners
Season	Teams	L1QC Champions League winners	Coupe L1QC Cup winners
2018	5	Dynamo de Québec	—
2019	6	CS Monteuil	—
2020	4 (Note: Originally 8 clubs were set to participate, however, due to the COVID-19 pandemic, four clubs withdrew from the season)	A.S. Blainville	—
2021	10	A.S. Blainville	A.S. Blainville
2022	12	A.S. Blainville	A.S. Blainville
2023	12	PEF Québec	PEF Québec
2024	12	CS Mont-Royal Outremont	—

L1QC Women's trophy winners
Season	Ligue1 division	Ligue2 division
2025	CS Mont-Royal Outremont	Lakeshore SC

== Clubs ==
=== Current clubs ===
==== Ligue 1 Québec ====
The following twelve teams are members of the league for the 2024 season:

Team	City	Stadium	Joined
Current teams
A.S. Blainville	Blainville, Laurentides	Parc Blainville	2018
AS Chaudière-Ouest	Lévis	Parc Renaud-Maillette	2022
Celtix du Haut-Richelieu	Saint-Jean-sur-Richelieu, Montérégie	Parc Pierre-Benoît	2021
AS Laval (Note: AS Laval was known as CS Monteuil until the 2021 season)	Laval, Laval	Parc de Lausanne	2018
FC Laval (Note: FC Laval was known as CS Fabrose until the 2020 season)	Laval, Laval	Parc Roseval & Parc Raymond-Millar	2019
CS Longueuil	Longueuil, Montérégie	Parc Laurier	2020
CS Mont-Royal Outremont	Mount Royal, Montréal	Parc Recreatif de TMR	2019
CS St-Hubert	Saint-Hubert, Montérégie	Centre Sportif Roseanne-Laflamme	2020
Ottawa South United	Ottawa, Ontario	TAAG Park (Carleton University)	2020
CF Montréal Academy	Laval, Laval	Centre Sportif Bois-de-Boulogne	2022
Royal-Sélect de Beauport	Beauport, Quebec City	Stade Beauport	2021

Locations of current (red) and future (green) clubs.

==== Ligue 2 Québec ====
The following teams are members of the league for the 2025 season:

Team	City	Stadium	Joined
Current teams
AS Brossard	Brossard, Montérégie		2025
AS Gatineau	Gatineau, Outaouais		2025
CF L'International de Québec	Quebec City		2025
CS Boucherville	Boucherville		2025
CS du Bas-Richelieu	Sorel-Tracy		2025
CS Fury de Rimouski	Rimouski		2025
CS LaSalle	Montréal		2025
CS Roussilion	Saint-Constant		2025
CS Saint-Laurent	Saint-Laurent, Montreal	Vanier College Stadium	2025
CS Trident	Quebec City		2025
CS Trois-Rivières	Trois-Rivières		2025
FC Anjou	Anjou		2025
Lakeshore SC	Kirkland, Montréal		2025
CS Lanaudière-Nord	Joliette, Lanaudière		2025
CS Lévis-Est	Lévis		2025
CS Mistral de Sherbrooke	Sherbrooke		2025
CS Phénix des Rivières	Quebec City		2025
Revolution FC	Saint-Eustache		2025
CS Union Lanaudière Sud	Repentigny		2025

=== Former clubs ===
Club	City	Stadium	Joined	Left
Former teams
Dynamo de Quebec	Quebec City, Capitale-Nationale	ESLE	2018	2019
FC Sélect Rive-Sud	Longueuil, Montérégie	Centre Multi Sport	2018	2019
Lakers du Lac Saint-Louis	Lachine, Montréal	Dollard 2	2018	2018
Pierrefonds FC	Lac St-Louis, Montreal	Pierrefonds Community High School	2020	2024

== Players who earned national team caps while in the L1QC ==
The following players have earned a senior national team cap while playing in the L1QC (the year of their first cap while playing in the league is listed). Players who earned caps before or after playing in the L1QC are not included, unless they also earned caps while in the league. This section also does not include youth caps (U23 or below).

Player	Country	Year	Ref
Stefani Kouzas	Guyana	2022	

== L1QC clubs in other competitions ==
Season	Women's division			
Season	Club	Competition	Result	Record
2018	No competition held			
2019	No competition held			
2020	No competition held			
2021	No competition held			
2022	A.S. Blainville	Inter-Provincial Championship	Champions	2–0–0
2022	AS Laval	Inter-Provincial Championship	Runner-up	1–0–1
2023	PEF Québec	Inter-Provincial Championship	Runner-up	1–0–1
2024	CS Mont-Royal Outremont	Inter-Provincial Championship	Runner-up	1–0–1
2025	CS Mont-Royal Outremont	Inter-Provincial Championship	Runner-up	1–0–1

== See also ==
- Canadian soccer league system
- League1 Ontario (women)
- League1 British Columbia
- United Women's Soccer
