= Hugo Chambon =

French footballer (born 1996)

Personal information
- Date of birth: 10 August 1996 (age 30)
- Place of birth: France
- Height: 1.87 m (6 ft 2 in)
- Position: Striker

Team information
- Current team: Progrès Niederkorn
- Number: 9

College career
Years	Team	Apps	(Gls)
2016–2019	Montreal Carabins		

Senior career*
Years	Team	Apps	(Gls)
2019–2020	AS Blainville		
2020–2021	US Lusitanos Saint-Maur		
2021–2022	FC Grandvillars	20	(14)
2022–2023	Olympique Saint-Quentin	27	(16)
2023–2024	Amiens	0	(0)
2024	→ SAS Épinal (loan)	8	(4)
2024–2025	Cannes	7	(0)
2025–	Progrès Niederkorn	19	(1)
- * Club domestic league appearances and goals as of 13 June 2026

Hugo Chambon (born 10 August 1996) is a French footballer who plays as a striker for Luxembourg National Division club Progrès Niederkorn.

== Early life ==
Chambon is a native of Lyon, France.

== Career ==
Chambon started his career in Canada. He was the top scorer of Group E of the 2021–22 Championnat National 3 with fifteen goals. In 2022, he signed for French side Olympique Saint-Quentin, where he was regarded as one of the club's most important players.

Before the 2023–24 season, Chambon moved to Amiens in Ligue 2.

== Style of play ==
Chambon mainly operates as a striker and has been described as an "attacking player with a very complete profile".
