= AS Laval =

Semi-professional soccer club

- Full name: Alliance Soccer Laval
- Founded: 1966 (as CS Monteuil); 2021 (as AS Laval)
- Stadium: Lausanne Park
- Head Coach: Karim Ziani
- League: Ligue1 Québec
- 2025: L1Q, 2nd (men); L1Q, 9th (women)
- Website: https://www.aslaval.com/
Home colours

Alliance Soccer Laval (formerly CS Monteuil) is a Canadian semi-professional soccer club based in Laval, Quebec that plays in Ligue1 Québec. In 2021, CS Monteuil merged with youth club CS Étoiles de l’Est to form AS Laval.

== History ==
=== CS Monteuil ===
CS Monteuil logo

The club was originally formed in 1966 under the name l’Association sportive Monteuil de Laval.

In 2018, they entered a team in the women's division of the Première Ligue de soccer du Québec (today Ligue1 Québec (women)). In 2019, the women won the league, earning 33 points through 15 games to come in first place. In 2021, the club finished in second place in both the league season and the league cup.

In 2019, a year after the women's team, the club entered a team in the men's division the Première Ligue de soccer du Québec (today Ligue1 Québec) a Division III league in the Canadian pyramid, with Sandro Grande becoming the men's head coach. They played their first match on May 4 against FC Gatineau winning 3–2. They finished in sixth place out of nine teams in their inaugural season In 2020, Antoine Katako, formerly the coach of CS Fabrose took over as head coach, replacing interim coach David Cerasuolo, who took over following the departure of head coach Sandro Grande as well as technical director Marco Masucci late in the season, who took a position with the Quebec Soccer Federation. In 2021, Vassilios "Billy" Zagakos succeeded Antoine Katako as head coach. Following the conclusion of the 2024 season, Zagakos was replaced by Karim Ziani, who was appointed as the club’s new head coach.

=== AS Laval ===
In late 2021, CS Monteuil merged with CS Étoiles de l’Est to form a new club in later 2021 known as AS Laval (initially a third club, CS Centre-Sud, was to be part of the merger, but they later pulled out). In 2022, the women's team finished second in the league, qualifying them for the inaugural League1 Canada Interprovincial Championship, where they finished in second place, after defeating League1 Ontario side Alliance United FC in a penalty shootout in the semi-finals, before losing to PLSQ champions AS Blainville in the finals.

== Seasons ==
=== Men ===
as CS Monteuil

Season	League	Teams	Record	Rank	League Cup	Ref
2019	Première Ligue de soccer du Québec	9	6–6–4	6th	Group Stage	
2020	on hiatus – COVID-19					
2021	Première Ligue de soccer du Québec	10 (Note: Ottawa South United withdrew from the 2021 league mid-way through due to government restrictions, with their matches removed from the standings. Thus, Monteuil's two victories against Ottawa were not included in their record.)	4–2–10	7th	–	

as AS Laval

Season	League	Teams	Record	Rank	League Cup	Ref
2022	Première Ligue de soccer du Québec	12	7–4–11	9th	did not qualify	
2023	Ligue1 Québec	12	7–3–12	9th	Quarter-finals	
2024	Ligue1 Québec	11	4–8–8	11th	did not qualify	
2025	Ligue1 Québec	10	11–1–6	2nd	Semi-finals	

=== Women ===
as CS Monteuil

Season	League	Teams	Record	Rank	League Cup	Interprovincial Championship	Ref
2018	Première Ligue de soccer du Québec	5	5–2–5	2nd	–	–	
2019	Première Ligue de soccer du Québec	6	10–3–2	1st	–	–	
2020	Première Ligue de soccer du Québec	on hiatus – COVID-19					
2021	Première Ligue de soccer du Québec	10	6–3–0	2nd	Finalists	–	

as AS Laval

Season	League	Teams	Record	Rank	Playoffs	League Cup	Interprovincial Championship	Ref
2022	Première Ligue de soccer du Québec	12	8–2–1	2nd	–	Semi-finals	Finalists	
2023	Ligue1 Québec	12	3–4–4	7th	–	Quarter-finals	did not qualify	
2024	Ligue1 Québec	12	5–2–9	5th, Group B (10th overall)	did not qualify	–	did not qualify	
2025	Ligue1 Québec	10	1–0–12	5th, Group B (9th overall)	did not qualify	–	did not qualify	

== Notable former players ==
The following players have either played at the professional or international level, either before or after playing for the PLSQ/L1Q team:

Men

- (Canada) Mouhamadou Kane
- (Canada) Ndzemdzela Langwa
- (Guinea) Mohamed Kourouma
- (Cameroon) Armand Ken Ella
- (Iran) Nima Moazeni Zadeh

Women

- (Canada) Latifah Abdu
- (Canada) Jessica De Filippo
- (Canada) Marika Guay
- (Canada) Stéphanie Hill
- (Guyana) (Canada) Stefani Kouzas
- (Canada) Karima Lemire
- (Canada) Chloe Minas
- (Haiti) (Canada) Laurie-Ann Moïse
- (Canada) Noémi Paquin
- (Canada) Amy Pietrangelo
