= 2024 Ligue1 Québec féminine season =

Ligue1 Québec Women's Division
- Season: 2024
- Dates: April 20 – August 3

The 2024 Ligue1 Québec féminine season will be the seventh season of play for Ligue1 Québec (and the second since rebranding from the Première ligue de soccer du Québec), a Division 3 women's soccer league in the Canadian soccer pyramid and the highest level of soccer based in the Canadian province of Québec.

== Changes from 2023 ==
The teams will be split into two divisions based on geography, rather than hosting a single division as in previous seasons. The league champion will be decided through a playoff system, instead of the team with the highest point total. The Coupe L1Q will not be held in 2024.

== Teams ==
Twelve teams will participate in the 2024 season. The teams will be divided into two divisions of six teams, with each team playing the other teams in their division twice, as well as the teams in the other division once, for a total of 16 matches. The top two teams will advance to a Final Four tournament, with the winner advancing to the League1 Canada Interprovincial final.

Team	City	Stadium	Head coach
A.S. Blainville	Blainville, Laurentides	Parc Blainville	
AS Chaudière-Ouest	Lévis, Quebec	Parc Renaud-Maillette	
Pierrefonds FC	Pierrefonds, Quebec	Pierrefonds Community High School	
Celtix du Haut-Richelieu	Saint-Jean-sur-Richelieu, Montérégie	Parc Pierre-Benoît	
AS Laval	Laval, Laval	Parc de Lausanne	
FC Laval	Laval, Laval	Parc Roseval & Parc Raymond-Millar	
CS Longueuil	Longueuil, Montérégie	Parc Laurier	
CS Mont-Royal Outremont	Mount Royal, Montréal	Parc Recreatif de TMR	
CS St-Hubert	Saint-Hubert, Montérégie	Centre Sportif Roseanne-Laflamme	
Ottawa South United	Ottawa, Ontario	TAAG Park (Carleton University)	
CF Montréal Academy	Montreal, Montréal	Centre Sportif Bois-de-Boulogne	
Royal-Sélect de Beauport	Beauport, Quebec City	Stade Beauport	

== Standings ==
=== Group A ===
Pos	Team	Pld	W	D	L	GF	GA	GD	Pts	Qualification
1	CF Montréal Academy	16	10	1	5	38	13	+25	31	Advance to Final Four playoffs
2	CS Mont-Royal Outremont (C)	16	8	5	3	21	12	+9	29	Advance to Final Four playoffs
3	FC Laval	16	8	4	4	25	20	+5	28	
4	Ottawa South United	16	7	3	6	30	22	+8	24	
5	AS Pierrefonds	16	7	2	7	22	24	−2	23	
6	CS St-Hubert	16	0	4	12	5	34	−29	4	

Source: Spordle
Rules for classification: 1) points; 2) total wins; 3) head-to-head points; 4) goal differential; 5) most goals
(C) Champions

=== Group B ===
Pos	Team	Pld	W	D	L	GF	GA	GD	Pts	Qualification
1	A.S. Blainville	16	10	4	2	26	13	+13	34	Advance to Final Four playoffs
2	Royal-Sélect de Beauport	16	9	2	5	21	14	+7	29	Advance to Final Four playoffs
3	Celtix du Haut-Richelieu	16	8	2	6	22	21	+1	26	
4	CS Longueuil	16	6	1	9	17	20	−3	19	
5	AS Laval	16	5	2	9	21	33	−12	17	
6	Rapides de Chaudière-Ouest	16	2	2	12	12	34	−22	8	

Source: Spordle
Rules for classification: 1) points; 2) total wins; 3) head-to-head points; 4) goal differential; 5) most goals

=== Playoffs ===
The top two teams in each division will avance to the playoffs. The winner will advance to the League1 Canada Interprovincial Championship.

Semi-Finals; July 27-28
A1	CF Montréal Academy	1
B2	Royal-Sélect de Beauport	0
B1	AS Blainville	2
A2	CS Mont-Royal Outremont	5

Final; August 3
A1	CF Montréal Academy	1
A2	CS Mont-Royal Outremont	2

Source: Spordle

=== Statistics ===
Top goalscorers
(does not include playoffs)

Rank	Player	Club	Goals
1	(Canada) Esther Brossard	CF Montréal Academy	16
2	(Canada) Rosa Maalouf	Ottawa South United	9
3	(Canada) Amélia Bouchard	Royal-Sélect de Beauport	7
4	(Canada) Chloe Renaud	CS Longueuil	6
4	(Canada) Erika Bastien	AS Blainville	6
4	(Canada) Eva Vespa	FC Laval	6
7	6 players tied		5

Source: Spordle

==== Awards ====
Award	Player (club)	Ref
Ballon d'or (Best Player)	Esther Brossard (CF Montréal Academy)	
Ballon d'argent (2nd Best Player)	Mégane Gagnon (AS Blainville)	
Ballon de bronze (3rd Best Player)	Shayla He (CS Mont-Royal Outremont)	
Soulier D'Or (Golden Boot - Top Scorer)	Esther Brossard (CF Montréal Academy)	
Gant D'Or (Golden Glove - Top Goalkeeper)	Léa Palacio-Tellier (CS Mont-Royal Outremont)	
Coach of the Year	Sidi Mohamed Farah (CS Mont-Royal Outremont)	

== Friendlies ==
June 22, 2024	(United States) Vermont Green FC	1–1 (5–4 SO)	FC Laval	Burlington, Vermont, United States
	Renwick 63'	Report	Moise 90'	Stadium: Virtue Field; Attendance: 3000+
	Shootout
	Micheels (penalty missed); Bankert (penalty scored); O'Malley (penalty scored); Dionicio (penalty scored); Renwick (penalty scored); Purcell (penalty scored)		Mi. Marolly (penalty scored); Vespa (penalty scored); Anes-Guerber (penalty missed); Moise (penalty scored); Even (penalty scored); Ma. Marolly (penalty missed)
