= 2021 Première ligue de soccer du Québec féminine season =

Première ligue de soccer du Québec Women's Division
- Season: 2021
- Dates: June 26 – August 8 (League); August 13–15 (Cup)
- Champions: A.S. Blainville
- Cup champions: A.S. Blainville
- Matches: 45
- Goals: 149 (3.31 per match)
- Top goalscorer: Latifa Abdu (8) (CS Mont-Royal Outremont)

The 2021 Première ligue de soccer du Québec féminine season was the fourth season of play for the Première ligue de soccer du Québec, a Division 3 women's soccer league in the Canadian soccer pyramid and the highest level of soccer based in the Canadian province of Québec.

A.S. Blainville was the defending champions from 2021. A.S. Blainville defended their title in the women's division and also won the inaugural women's League Cup.

== Changes from 2020 and Changes due to pandemic ==
The 2021 season will have its greatest number of participating teams with 10 teams in the female division. As with the 2020 PLSQ season, the start of the season was delayed due to the pandemic. In the women's division, Royal-Sélect de Beauport and Celtix du Haut-Richelieu join as new entries in the division. Pierrefonds FC will also debut for the first time, after their entry in 2020 was withdrawn due to the pandemic. In addition, CS Mont-Royal Outremont, CS Monteuil, and CS St-Hubert will also return from hiatus, after not playing in 2020 due to the COVID-19 pandemic. CS Fabrose became FC Laval following a merger with two other local clubs. The women's division will run from June 26 to August 8. The ten women's teams will play each team once, for a total of nine games. The top four teams in the standings will then take part in the PLSQ Cup for the first time, which will take place on August 13 and 15, at the Desjardins stadium in Laval.

== Teams ==
Ten teams participated in the 2021 season. Each team played against every other team once. At the end of the season, the top four teams will qualify for the first edition of the League Cup (Coupe PLSQ).

Team	City	Stadium
A.S. Blainville	Blainville, Laurentides	Parc Blainville
Pierrefonds FC	Pierrefonds, Quebec	Pierrefonds Community High School
Celtix du Haut-Richelieu	Saint-Jean-sur-Richelieu, Montérégie	Stade Alphonse-Desjardins
FC Laval	Laval, Laval	Collège Montmorency
CS Longueuil	Longueuil, Montérégie	Parc Laurier
CS Mont-Royal Outremont	Mount Royal, Montréal	Parc Recreatif de TMR
CS Monteuil	Laval, Laval	Parc de Lausanne
CS St-Hubert	Saint-Hubert, Montérégie	Centre Sportif Roseanne-Laflamme
Ottawa South United	Ottawa, Ontario	George Nelms Sports Park
Royal-Sélect de Beauport	Beauport, Quebec City	Stade Beauport

== Standings ==
Pos	Team	Pld	W	D	L	GF	GA	GD	Pts	Qualification
1	A.S. Blainville (C, L)	9	7	1	1	25	4	+21	22	Coupe PLSQ
2	CS Monteuil	9	6	3	0	23	6	+17	21 (Note: CS Monteuil had a better goal differential than Royal-Sélect de Beauport.)	Coupe PLSQ
3	Royal-Sélect de Beauport	9	6	3	0	22	7	+15	21	Coupe PLSQ
4	Pierrefonds FC	9	6	1	2	23	14	+9	19	Coupe PLSQ
5	Celtix du Haut-Richelieu	9	3	2	4	16	19	−3	11 (Note: Celtix du Haut-Richelieu beat CS Mont-Royal Outremont and Ottawa South United on head-to-head points (6–1–1).)	
6	CS Mont-Royal Outremont	9	3	2	4	10	11	−1	11 (Note: CS Mont-Royal Outremont had a better goal differential than Ottawa South United.)	
7	Ottawa South United	9	3	2	4	15	18	−3	11	
8	CS St-Hubert	9	1	2	6	5	24	−19	5	
9	FC Laval	9	1	0	8	9	28	−19	3	
10	CS Longueuil	9	0	2	7	7	24	−17	2	

Source: PLSQ
Rules for classification: 1) points; 2) total wins; 3) head-to-head points; 4) goal differential; 5) most goals
(C) Champions; (L) Coupe PLSQ winner

=== Top scorers ===
Rank	Player	Club	Goals
1	Latifah Abdu	CS Mont-Royal Outremont	8
2	Laurie-Ann Moise	CS Monteuil	7
3	Julia Mulhern	Pierrefonds FC	6
3	Claudia Asselin	AS Blainville	6
5	Naya Marcil	Celtix du Haut-Richelieu	5
5	Sarah Humes	AS Blainville	5
5	Joelle Mercier	Royal Sélect Beauport	5
5	Nathalie Brunelle	AS Blainville	5

=== Awards ===
Award	Player (club)	Ref
Ballon d'or (Best Player)	Donya Salomon Ali (FC Laval)	
Ballon d'argent (2nd Best Player)	Maya Smith (Ottawa South United)	
Ballon de bronze (3rd Best Player)	Latifah Abdu (CS Mont-Royal Outremont)	
Golden Boot (Top Scorer)	Latifah Abdu (CS Mont-Royal Outremont)	
Coach of the Year	Jean-Lou Gosselin (AS Blainville)	

== Coupe PLSQ ==
Semi-finals
1	AS Blainville	3
4	Pierrefonds FC	0
2	CS Monteuil	3
3	Royal-Sélect de Beauport	1

Final
1	AS Blainville	1
2	CS Monteuil	0

Semi-finals

August 13, 2021	AS Blainville	3–0	Pierrefonds FC	Laval, Quebec
6:00 pm	V.Sanderson; C.Asselin; Sauvé			Stadium: Desjardins Stadium; Referee: Salma Flores Desrochers

August 13, 2021	CS Monteuil	3–1	Royal-Sélect de Beauport	Laval, Quebec
8:30 pm	K.Fournier 40'; A.François 86' (pen.); L.Portelance 89'		K.Tremblay 50'	Stadium: Desjardins Stadium; Referee: Isabelle Duclos

Final

August 15, 2021	AS Blainville	1–0	CS Monteuil	Laval, Quebec
1:30 pm	Sauvé 41'	Report		Stadium: Desjardins Stadium; Referee: Sheila Couture
