= 2023 Ligue1 Québec féminine season =

Ligue1 Québec Women's Division
- Season: 2023
- Dates: 6 May – 15 July
- Champions: PEF Québec
- Coupe L1Q: PEF Québec
- Matches: 66
- Goals: 208 (3.15 per match)
- Top goalscorer: Esther Brossard (14 goals)

The 2023 Ligue1 Québec féminine season will be the sixth season of play for Ligue1 Québec (and the first since rebranding from the Première ligue de soccer du Québec), a Division 3 women's soccer league in the Canadian soccer pyramid and the highest level of soccer based in the Canadian province of Québec.

PEF Québec won the league and league cup double and qualified for the League1 Canada Interprovincial championship.

== Teams ==
Twelve teams will participate in the 2023 season.

Team	City	Stadium	Head coach
A.S. Blainville	Blainville, Laurentides	Parc Blainville	Gilles Grego
AS Chaudière-Ouest	Lévis, Quebec	Parc Renaud-Maillette	Benoit Carbonneau
Pierrefonds FC	Pierrefonds, Quebec	Pierrefonds Community High School	Carlos Carvalho
Celtix du Haut-Richelieu	Saint-Jean-sur-Richelieu, Montérégie	Parc Pierre-Benoît	William Lawson
AS Laval	Laval, Laval	Parc de Lausanne	David Cerasuolo
FC Laval	Laval, Laval	Parc Roseval & Parc Raymond-Millar	Amro Radwan
CS Longueuil	Longueuil, Montérégie	Parc Laurier	Vincent Tuffier
CS Mont-Royal Outremont	Mount Royal, Montréal	Parc Recreatif de TMR	Phillip Estacio
CS St-Hubert	Saint-Hubert, Montérégie	Centre Sportif Roseanne-Laflamme	Jean-Marie Theosmy
Ottawa South United	Ottawa, Ontario	TAAG Park (Carleton University)	Peter Mapendere
PEF Québec	Montreal, Montréal	Centre Sportif Bois-de-Boulogne	Julie Casselman
Royal-Sélect de Beauport	Beauport, Quebec City	Stade Beauport	Michel Fischer

== Standings ==
Pos	Team	Pld	W	D	L	GF	GA	GD	Pts	Qualification
1	PEF Québec (C)	11	8	2	1	28	7	+21	26	Interprovincial Championship
2	Rapides de Chaudière-Ouest	11	7	2	2	23	12	+11	23	
3	A.S. Blainville	11	6	3	2	21	8	+13	21	
4	Pierrefonds FC	11	6	3	2	18	10	+8	21	
5	Ottawa South United	11	5	1	5	23	18	+5	16	
6	Royal-Sélect de Beauport	11	4	3	4	18	17	+1	15	
7	AS Laval	11	3	4	4	17	14	+3	13	
8	FC Laval	11	3	3	5	17	20	−3	12	
9	CS Mont-Royal Outremont	11	2	6	3	9	12	−3	12	
10	Celtix du Haut-Richelieu	11	1	6	4	17	27	−10	9	
11	CS Longueuil	11	1	4	6	11	26	−15	7	
12	CS St-Hubert	11	1	1	9	6	37	−31	4	

Source: Spordle
Rules for classification: 1) points; 2) total wins; 3) head-to-head points; 4) goal differential; 5) most goals
(C) Champions

=== Top scorers ===
Rank	Player	Club	Goals
1	Esther Brossard	PEF Québec	14
2	Léa-Jeanne Fortier	Rapides de Chaudière-Ouest	8
2	Victoria Dupont	Celtix du Haut-Richelieu	8
4	Flavie Dube	Ottawa South United	7
4	Fatou N'Diaye	Pierrefonds FC	7
6	Florianne Jourde	AS Laval	5
6	Daphnée Blouin	FC Laval	5
6	Léa Larouche	PEF Québec	5

==== Awards ====
Award	Player (club)
Ballon d'or (Best Player)	Esther Brossard (PEF Québec)
Ballon d'argent (2nd Best Player)	Mégane Sauvé (AS Blainville)
Ballon de bronze (3rd Best Player)	Léa-Jeanne Fortiera (AS Chaudière-Ouest)
Soulier D'Or (Golden Boot - Top Scorer)	Esther Brossard (PEF Québec)
Gant D'Or (Golden Glove - Top Goalkeeper)	Anaïs van Doesburg (PEF Québec)
Coach of the Year	Julie Casselman (PEF Québec)

== Coupe L1QC ==
The two Coupe PLSQ finalists from the previous season (AS Blainville and Rapides de Chaudière-Ouest) advanced directly to the Quarter-Final round. Two additional clubs (FC Laval and RS Beauport) were selected by a random draw to also advance directly to the Quarter-Final round.

First Round; July 4–6
AS Laval	2
Celtix du Haut-Richelieu	1
CS Mont-Royal Outremont	3
CS Longueuil	0
Ottawa South United	1
Pierrefonds FC	3
PEF Québec	2
CS St-Hubert	0

Quarter-Finals; July 20–22
AS Blainville	1(4)
AS Laval	1(2)
FC Laval	2
CS Mont-Royal Outremont	0
Rapides de Chaudière-Ouest	6
Pierrefonds FC	2
Royal-Sélect de Beauport	2
PEF Québec	4

Semi-Finals; July 29–30
AS Blainville	0
FC Laval	3
Rapides de Chaudière-Ouest	0
PEF Québec	1

Final; August 6
FC Laval	0
PEF Québec	2

Source: Spordle
