= Ottawa South United =

Canadian semi-professional soccer club

- Full name: Ottawa South United Soccer Association
- Nicknames: OSU Force, OSU Atlético
- Founded: 2003 (club); 2017 (semi-professional team)
- Stadium: George Nelms Sports Park
- League: Ligue1 Québec
- 2025: L1Q, 9th (men); L1Q, 7th (women)
- Website: https://www.osu.ca
Home colours	Away colours

Ottawa South United is a Canadian semi-professional soccer team based in Manotick, Ontario, a community in the rural south part of Ottawa that plays in Ligue1 Québec. The club previously competed in League1 Ontario. The club formed a partnership with Canadian Premier League club Atlético Ottawa and as part of the partnership, their PLSQ teams will be known as OSU Atlético. The team is part of the larger Ottawa South United youth soccer club organization.

== History ==
Former club crest

The club was founded as a youth soccer club in 2003 through a merger between Osgoode – Rideau Soccer Association (founded in 1972) and South Nepean United (founded in 1980). The club offers recreational and competitive in the Greater Ottawa Region. The Force Academy program draws players from across Eastern Ontario and Western Quebec. OSU was recognized by Ontario Soccer with the Gold Award for Club Excellence, was a founding member of the Ontario Player Development League (OPDL) and one of the first 39 clubs in Canada to be granted a National Youth Club License.

In 2016, OSU partnered with American youth club Dallas Texans SC and Nike, which made it a part of the Dallas Texans' affiliation with Spanish La Liga club Atlético Madrid. Soon after, Atlético, with OSU, hosted a soccer camp in the city, a precursor to the Spanish club ultimately forming Atlético Ottawa to play in the Canadian Premier League in 2020. In 2016, they also partnered with Major League Soccer club Vancouver Whitecaps FC to launch a new Whitecaps FC Ottawa Academy Centre, in partnership with the Whitecaps FC Residency program where players could proceed in the next stage of their development. In 2020, they partnered with Canadian Premier League club Atlético Ottawa becoming the first club to join Atlético's ‘Community Partnership Soccer Program.’ Through this, OSU will have access to coaching development, player development, Atlético player appearances, and open practices, while their male and female semi-pro teams will wear a “Powered by Atlético” crest on their sleeve. As part of the partnership, the club announced that their PLSQ teams will be known as OSU Atlético and the teams wearing Atlético's red-and-white striped kits, which was formalized in 2023.

== Semi-professional team ==
In 2017, the club joined League1 Ontario, a Division III league, fielding a team in the men's division, using the club's nickname, OSU Force. They defeated Aurora FC in their inaugural match on April 29, 2017 by a score of 3–1. In 2019, they added a team in the League1 Ontario women's division.

For the 2020 season, the club moved both its male and female teams to the Première Ligue de soccer du Québec, a league on the same pyramid level as L1O, but located in the province of Quebec, in a move sanctioned by the Canadian Soccer Association, Ontario Soccer Association, and Soccer Quebec. While previously, the Ontario-based Ottawa Fury Academy had played in the Quebec-based league, this move represented the first time League1 Ontario and PLSQ have transferred a club between organizations. The move to play in a different province was approved to ease travel for both OSU and the other League1 Ontario clubs, as Ottawa was located closer to the Quebec clubs than any of the other Ontario teams. Due to restrictions put in place by the Government of Ontario as a result of the COVID-19 pandemic, OSU had to play home games in Quebec during the 2020 PLSQ season and required an exemption from the Ontario Soccer Association to be eligible to participate making them the only Ontario-based club who was able to play competitive fixtures in 2020. OSU was able to strengthen their roster for 2020 due to travel restrictions put in place as a result of the pandemic. Several players who were to play for teams in the United States instead joined Ottawa's team, resulting in only two players returning from the 2019 team that finished last in L1O. Their first season in the PLSQ was interrupted by the pandemic and cancelled before its conclusion, with standings to be determined based on points per game earned in matches up to that date. The male team ultimately finished in second place behind AS Blainville, following a 3–2 loss to Blainville, which was their only loss of the season, in the final match of the season before the cancellation, in which Blainville scored the winning goal in the final minute of the match. Midway through the 2021 season, the men's team was forced to withdraw from the league due to government restrictions and cross-border difficulties (the women had already completed their season), with their played matches removed from the rankings (they had a record of 1-2-7 at the time, sitting in 9th place). In recent years, the team has focused more on player development, with the club featuring the youngest average age in 2022 at 19 years old, several years younger than the rest of the teams in the league.

== Seasons ==
=== Men ===
Season	League	Teams	Record	Rank	Playoffs	League Cup	Ref
2017	League1 Ontario	16	6–1–14	6th, East (12th)	did not qualify	Quarter-finals	
2018	League1 Ontario	17	3–4–9	14th	did not qualify	Round of 16	
2019	League1 Ontario	16	0–1–14	16th	did not qualify	–	
2020 (Note: The 2020 season was cancelled before its conclusion, with the final standings determined on a points earned per game basis)	Première Ligue de soccer du Québec	6	4–2–1	2nd	–	–	
2021 (Note: OSU withdrew from the league mid-way through due to government restrictions, with their stats removed for the standings, making their official record 0–0–0)	Première Ligue de soccer du Québec	10	1–2–7	Withdrew	–	–	
2022	Première Ligue de soccer du Québec	12	1–2–19	12th	–	did not qualify	
2023	Ligue1 Québec (Note: Ligue1 Québec was known as the Première Ligue de soccer du Québec until 2022)	12	5–4–13	11th	–	First Round	
2024	Ligue1 Québec	11	6–5–9	9th	–	did not qualify	
2025	Ligue1 Québec	10	4–5–9	9th	–	did not qualify	

=== Women ===
Season	League	Teams	Record	Rank	Playoffs	League Cup	Ref
2019	League1 Ontario	14	6–2–5	5th	Quarter-finals	–	
2020	Première Ligue de soccer du Québec	4	0–0–3	4th	4th	–	
2021	Première Ligue de soccer du Québec	10	3–2–4	7th	–	did not qualify	
2022	Première Ligue de soccer du Québec	12	4–1–6	8th	–	did not qualify	
2023	Ligue1 Québec (Note: Ligue1 Québec was known as the Première Ligue de soccer du Québec until 2022)	12	5–1–5	5th	–	First Round	
2024	Ligue1 Québec	12	7–3–6	4th, Group A (7th overall)	did not qualify	–	
2025	Ligue1 Québec	10	5–2–6	4th, Group A (7th overall)	did not qualify	–	

== Notable former players ==
The following players have either played at the professional or international level, either before or after playing for the semi-professional team:

Men

- (Lebanon) Gabriel Bitar
- (Canada) Loïc Cloutier
- (Canada) Dario Conte
- (Canada) Myles Cornwall
- (Canada) Matteo de Brienne
- (Canada) Emad Houache
- (Canada) Stefan Karajovanovic
- (Lebanon) Ralph Khoury
- (Canada) Ronan Kratt
- (United States) Anthony Legendre
- (Canada) Jaeden Mercure
- (Lebanon) Tony Mikhael
- (South Sudan) Nevello Yoseke

Women

- (Canada) Emily Amano
- (Canada) Florence Belzile
- (Canada) Annabelle Chukwu
- (Canada) Clarissa Larisey
- (Canada) Naomi Lofthouse
- (Canada) Miranda Smith
- (Canada) Mia Ugarte
