= Pierrefonds FC =

Semi-professional soccer club

- Full name: Association de Soccer de Pierrefonds
- Head Coach: Carlos Carvalho
- League: Ligue1 Québec
- 2024: L1Q-Female, 8th
- Website: http://soccerpierrefonds.ca/

Association de Soccer de Pierrefonds is a Canadian soccer club based in Pierrefonds, Quebec that plays in women's division of Ligue1 Québec. Their L1QC team operates under the name Pierrefonds FC.

== History ==
Established as a youth soccer club, the club had an established program for many years, including a senior team in the Ligue de Soccer Elite Quebec, Quebec's top amateur division.

The club announced that they would enter a team in the women's division of the semi-professional Première Ligue de soccer du Québec. They had originally planned to enter the team into the league a couple of years earlier, however, floods had damaged their fields, requiring them to delay their entry. However, the COVID-19 pandemic interrupted the 2020 season and upon the league's re-start, the club decided to not participate in 2020.

The club has a working arrangement with top-tier Spanish club Valencia CF. In 2020, Pierrefonds received their national license recognition from the Canadian Soccer Association. In 2020, the club decided to merge with Club de Soccer Dollard to form Force FC, although the PLSQ club is still expected to be under the name Pierrefonds.

In their first season in 2021, they began the year winning their first five games, ultimately finishing fourth in the division.

== Seasons ==
Women

Season	League	Teams	Record	Rank	Playoffs	League Cup	Ref
2021	Première Ligue de soccer du Québec	10	6–1–2	4th	–	Semi-finals	
2022	Première Ligue de soccer du Québec	12	4–2–5	6th	–	did not qualify	
2023	Ligue1 Québec	12	6–3–2	4th	–	Quarter-finals	
2024	Ligue1 Québec	12	7–2–7	5th, Group A (8th overall)	did not qualify	–	

== Notable former players ==
- (Canada) Melissa Dagenais
- (Canada) Stéphanie Hill
