= AS Chaudière-Ouest =

Semi-professional soccer club

Rapides de Chaudière-Ouest
- Full name: Association de Soccer de Chaudière-Ouest
- Nickname: Les Rapides
- Short name: ASCO
- Founded: 2002
- League: Ligue1 Québec
- 2025: L2Q, 7th (men); L1Q, 10th (women)
- Website: https://www.assco.ca/

Association de Soccer de Chaudière-Ouest is a Canadian semi-professional soccer club based in Lévis, Quebec that plays in the women's and men's division of Ligue1 Québec. Their L1QC women's team operates under the name Rapides de Chaudière-Ouest.

== History ==

Established as a youth soccer club, the club was founded in 2002. In December 2020, they were awarded the Canadian Soccer Association national license for their excellence.

It was announced that they would enter the women's division of Première Ligue de soccer du Québec starting in 2022, becoming the second team from the Quebec City area in the league (Royal-Sélect de Beauport is the other). Their men's team, however, was not selected to join for the 2022 season, as they had been playing at the AA level in the Ligue de soccer élite du Québec in 2021, rather than the AAA (as the women were). The men joined the AAA level for 2022, with the hope of joining the PLSQ the following year.

The women played their first PLSQ match on May 7, 2022, defeating CS Longueuil by a score of 1-0. They finished third place in the league in their inaugural season, qualifying them for the Coupe PLSQ, where they finished in second place, after being defeated by AS Blainville in the final.

== Year-by-year ==
Men

Season	League	Teams	Record	Rank	League Cup	Ref
2025	Ligue2 Québec	24	13–4–6	7th	–	

Women

Season	League	Teams	Record	Rank	Playoffs	League Cup	Ref
2022	Première Ligue de soccer du Québec	12	7–3–1	3rd	–	Finalists	
2023	Ligue1 Québec	12	7–2–2	2nd	–	Semi-finals	
2024	Ligue1 Québec	12	2–2–12	6th, Group B (11th overall)	did not qualify	–	
2025	Ligue1 Québec	10	1–0–12	5th, Group B (10th overall)	did not qualify	–	
