= 2022 Première ligue de soccer du Québec féminine season =

Première ligue de soccer du Québec Women's Division
- Season: 2022
- Dates: 7 May – 16 July
- Champions: A.S. Blainville
- Coupe PLSQ: A.S. Blainville
- Matches: 66
- Goals: 201 (3.05 per match)

The 2022 Première ligue de soccer du Québec féminine season will be the fifth season of play for the Première ligue de soccer du Québec, a Division 3 women's soccer league in the Canadian soccer pyramid and the highest level of soccer based in the Canadian province of Québec.

A.S. Blainville won their third consecutive league title, as well as their second consecutive Coupe PLSQ. AS Blainville and AS Laval qualified for the League1 Canada Interprovincial Championship with Blainville winning the title and Laval finishing as runner-ups.

== Changes from 2021 ==
The 2022 season will have its greatest number of participating teams with 12 teams. AS Chaudière-Ouest and the Québec girls EXCEL program join as expansion franchises. CS Monteuil became AS Laval following a merger with another non-PLSQ club.

Each team will play each other once, with the top four clubs qualifying for the Coupe PLSQ. After the season, there will be a Final Four tournament, hosted in Laval, featuring two PLSQ teams and the champions of League1 Ontario and League1 British Columbia to decide the champion of League1 Canada.

== Teams ==
Twelve teams will participate in the 2022 season.

Team	City	Stadium
A.S. Blainville	Blainville, Laurentides	Parc Blainville
AS Chaudière-Ouest	Lévis, Quebec	Parc Renaud-Maillette & École secondaire les Etchemins
Pierrefonds FC	Pierrefonds, Quebec	Pierrefonds Community High School
Celtix du Haut-Richelieu	Saint-Jean-sur-Richelieu, Montérégie	Stade Alphonse-Desjardins
AS Laval	Laval, Laval	Parc de Lausanne
FC Laval	Laval, Laval	Collège Montmorency
CS Longueuil	Longueuil, Montérégie	Parc Laurier
CS Mont-Royal Outremont	Mount Royal, Montréal	Parc Recreatif de TMR
CS St-Hubert	Saint-Hubert, Montérégie	Centre Sportif Roseanne-Laflamme
Ottawa South United	Ottawa, Ontario	Quinn's Point Field
CSA PEF Québec	Montreal, Montréal	Centre Sportif Bois-de-Boulogne
Royal-Sélect de Beauport	Beauport, Quebec City	Stade Beauport

== Standings ==
Pos	Team	Pld	W	D	L	GF	GA	GD	Pts	Qualification
1	A.S. Blainville (C, L)	11	8	3	0	26	8	+18	27	Coupe PLSQ & Interprovincial Championship
2	AS Laval	11	8	2	1	22	5	+17	26	Coupe PLSQ & Interprovincial Championship
3	Rapides de Chaudière-Ouest	11	7	3	1	25	10	+15	24	Coupe PLSQ
4	FC Laval	11	7	1	3	18	13	+5	22	Coupe PLSQ
5	CS Mont-Royal Outremont	11	5	0	6	13	13	0	15	
6	Pierrefonds FC	11	4	2	5	15	13	+2	14 (Note: Pierrefonds FC finished ahead of PEF Québec on head-to-head points)	
7	PEF Québec	11	4	2	5	19	16	+3	14	
8	Ottawa South United	11	4	1	6	17	29	−12	13 (Note: Ottawa South United finished ahead of CS Longueuil on total wins and/or head-to-head points)	
9	CS Longueuil	11	3	4	4	9	8	+1	13	
10	Celtix du Haut-Richelieu	11	2	2	7	12	30	−18	8	
11	Royal-Sélect de Beauport	11	2	1	8	18	23	−5	7	
12	CS St-Hubert	11	1	1	9	7	33	−26	4	

Source: PLSQ
Rules for classification: 1) points; 2) total wins; 3) head-to-head points; 4) goal differential; 5) most goals
(C) Champions; (L) Coupe PLSQ winner

=== Top scorers ===
Rank	Player	Club	Goals
1	Cassandra Provost	AS Laval	8
2	Victoria Dupont	Celtix du Haut-Richelieu	6
3	Lea-Jeanne Fortier	Rapides de Chaudière-Ouest	5
3	Jessica Bunker	Rapides de Chaudière-Ouest	5
3	Alexie Bellerose	AS Blainville	5
3	Camille Raymond	Rapides de Chaudière-Ouest	5
7	9 players tied		4

=== Awards ===
Award	Player (club)	Ref
Ballon d'or (Best Player)	Mégane Sauvé (AS Blainville)	
Ballon d'argent (2nd Best Player)	Mara Bouchard (CS Longueuil)	
Ballon de bronze (3rd Best Player)	Sophie Therien (FC Laval)	
Golden Boot (Top Scorer - 8 goals)	Cassandra Provost (AS Laval)	
Coach of the Year	Robert Rositoiu (AS Blainville)	

== Coupe PLSQ ==
Semi-finals
1	A.S. Blainville	2 (4)
4	FC Laval	2 (3)
2	AS Laval	1
3	Rapides de Chaudière-Ouest	4

Final
1	A.S. Blainville	2
3	Rapides de Chaudière-Ouest	0

Semi-finals

July 31	A.S. Blainville	2–2 (4–3 p)	FC Laval	Blainville
6:00 PM	Bernard O'Breham; Gosselin		Blouin	Stadium: Parc Blainville; Referee: Salima-Djoher Djerroud

July 30	AS Laval	1–4	Rapides de Chaudière-Ouest	Laval
7:00 PM	Mallais		Bunker; Deschenes	Stadium: Parc de Lausanne; Referee: Salma Flores Desrochers

Final

August 7	A.S. Blainville	2–0	Rapides de Chaudière-Ouest	Laval
4:00 PM	Sauvé 9'; N.Brunelle 76'			Stadium: Centre Sportif Bois-de-Boulogne; Referee: Sheila Couture
