= A.S. Blainville =

Canadian football club

Coordinates: 45.6848°N 73.8730°W

- Full name: Association de Soccer de Blainville
- Founded: 1986; 40 years ago
- Stadium: Parc Blainville
- President: Sylvain Pereira
- Head Coach: Boubacar Coulibaly; Vincent Perret
- League: Ligue1 Québec
- 2025: L1Q, 6th (men); L1Q, 8th (women)
- Website: www.asblainville.com
Home colours	Away colours

Association de Soccer de Blainville, commonly referred to as A.S. Blainville, is a Canadian semi-professional soccer club based in the Montreal suburb of Blainville, Quebec, that plays in Ligue1 Québec. They are the only club to have participated in every season of the PLSQ.

== History ==
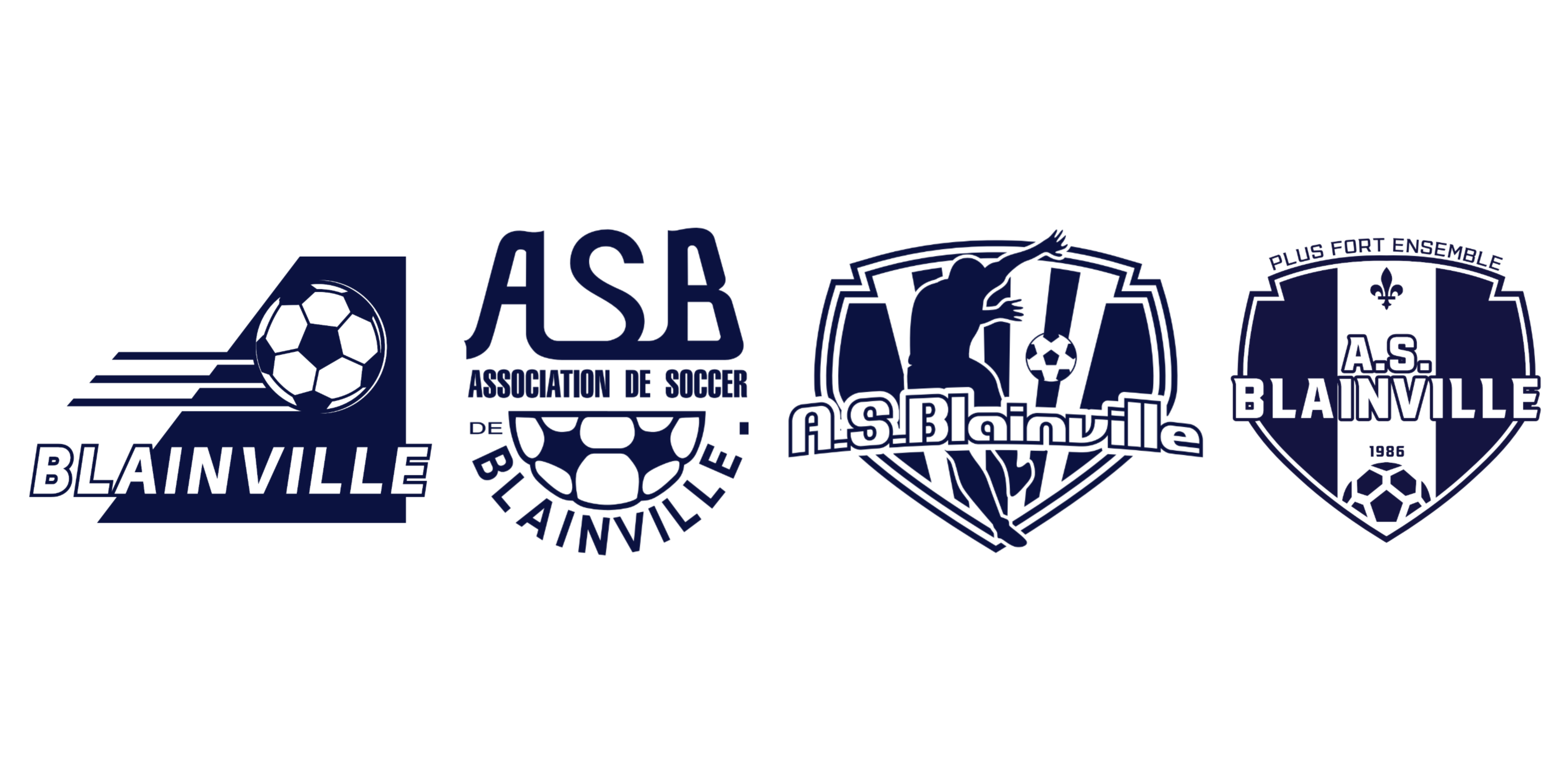
A.S. Blainville logo evolution from 1986 to the current 2026 identity.

The club was founded in 1986.

=== Men ===
In 2012, the semi-professional club was established to play in the newly formed Première ligue de soccer du Québec, a Division III league, as one of the founding members. They had a rivalry with FC Boisbriand, with both clubs being from the Laurentides region, although Boisbriand departed the league after the 2013 season, leaving Blainville as the only team from the region.

In 2016, they captured their first trophy, winning the League Cup by defeating FC Gatineau in the finals. In 2017, they won the league championship and they also defended their League Cup title, winning it for the second consecutive year. They repeated as league champions in 2018 and 2019, thereby being three-time defending champions. On September 30, 2017, AS Blainville clinched a spot in the 2018 Canadian Championship after securing first place in the 2017 Première Ligue de Soccer du Québec and became the first club from the PLSQ to be invited to take part in the Canadian Championship, Canada's highest level domestic soccer competition.

Beginning in 2018, the defending league champion would have the opportunity to participate in the Canadian Championship. In the 2018 Canadian Championship, they defeated League1 Ontario champion Oakville Blue Devils in the first qualifying round. In the second qualifying round, they lost to USL club Ottawa Fury FC. In the 2019 Canadian Championship, they were defeated by Canadian Premier League club York9 FC in the first qualifying round. Due to the COVID-19 pandemic, they were unable to participate in the 2020 edition, with their participation instead shifted to the following year's tournament. They won their fourth consecutive league championship in 2020, after defeating Ottawa South United in the final game of the season before the season was cut short due to the COVID-19 pandemic. In 2022, after a third place finish in the league, AS Blainville won the league cup, Coupe PLSQ, for the third time. In 2025, the club captured its fourth LS Pro Cup title, establishing A.S. Blainville as the most successful team in the tournament history.

=== Women ===
In 2018, they entered a team in the newly formed women's division of the Première Ligue de soccer du Québec. They won their first women's title during the 2020 season, which was shortened due to the COVID-19 pandemic, coming in first place with a perfect 3-0-0 record, in which they did not concede any goals, and defeating CS Fabrose in the championship final. The women defended their league title in 2021, which was played once again played in a shortened season (this year nine matches), contested by a full ten-team league, while also winning the inaugural women's Coupe PLSQ. They won their third consecutive women's league title in 2022, qualifying them for the first ever League1 Canada women's interprovincial championship, and also repeated as Coupe PLSQ champions. The women's team won the inaugural interprovincial title after defeating League1 British Columbia side Varsity FC in the semi-finals, and PLSQ runner-up AS Laval in the final. As champions, they earned automatic qualification to the 2023 edition of the tournament.

== Seasons ==
=== Men ===
Season	League	Teams	Record	Rank	League Cup	Canadian Championship	Ref
2012	Première ligue de soccer du Québec	5	6–2–8	3rd	–	Not eligible	
2013	Première ligue de soccer du Québec	7	5–5–8	6th	Group stage	Not eligible	
2014	Première ligue de soccer du Québec	6	4–3–13	5th	Semi-finals	Not eligible	
2015	Première ligue de soccer du Québec	7	8–6–4	3rd	Semi-finals	Not eligible	
2016	Première ligue de soccer du Québec	7	11–4–3	2nd	Champions	Not eligible	
2017	Première ligue de soccer du Québec	7	13–2–3	Champions	Champions	Not eligible	
2018	Première ligue de soccer du Québec	8	16–3–2	Champions	Quarter-finals	2nd Qualifying Round	
2019	Première ligue de soccer du Québec	9	11–4–1	Champions	Semi-finals	1st Qualifying Round	
2020 (Note: The 2020 season was cancelled before its conclusion, with the final standings determined on a points earned per game basis)	Première ligue de soccer du Québec	6	6–1–1	Champions	–	Moved to 2021	
2021	Première ligue de soccer du Québec	10 (Note: Ottawa South United withdrew from the 2021 league mid-way through due to government restrictions, with their matches removed from the standings. Thus, AS Blainville's victory against Ottawa is not included in their record.)	11–3–2	2nd	–	Preliminary round	
2022	Première ligue de soccer du Québec	12	14–2–6	3rd	Champions	did not qualify	
2023	Ligue1 Québec	12	9–3–10	7th	Quarter-finals	did not qualify	
2024	Ligue1 Québec	11	8–6–6	3rd	Quarter-finals	did not qualify	
2025	Ligue1 Québec	10	6–5–7	6th	Champions	did not qualify	

=== Women ===
Season	League	Teams	Record	Rank	Playoffs	League Cup	Interprovincial Championship	Ref
2018	Première ligue de soccer du Québec	5	4–3–5	3rd	–	–	–	
2019	Première ligue de soccer du Québec	6	7–4–4	3rd	–	–	–	
2020	Première ligue de soccer du Québec	4	3–0–0	1st	Champions	–	–	
2021	Première ligue de soccer du Québec	10	7–1–1	Champions	–	Champions	–	
2022	Première ligue de soccer du Québec	12	8–3–0	Champions	–	Champions	Champions	
2023	Ligue1 Québec	12	6–3–2	3rd	–	Semi-finals	did not qualify	
2024	Ligue1 Québec	12	10–4–2	1st, Group B (1st overall)	Semi-finals	–	did not qualify	
2025	Ligue1 Québec	10	4–3–6	4th, Group A (8th overall)	did not qualify	–	did not qualify	

== Notable former players ==
The following players have either played at the professional or international level, either before or after playing for the PLSQ team:

Men

- (Canada) Diyaeddine Abzi
- (Afghanistan) Zohib Islam Amiri
- (Canada) Gabriel Balbinotti
- (Cameroon) (Canada) Clément Bayiha
- (Canada) Nazim Belguendouz
- (France) Hugo Chambon
- (Lebanon) (Canada) Ibrahim Chami
- (Canada) Kevin Cossette
- (Mauritius) Kevin Chan-Yu-Tin
- (France) Alexandre Cuvillier
- (Burundi) (Canada) Armel Dagrou
- (Canada) Mohamed Farsi
- (Canada) Zachary Fernandez
- (Canada) Stefan Karajovanovic
- (Morocco) Omar Kreim
- (Canada) Pierre Lamothe
- (Canada) Yohan Le Bourhis
- (Canada) Wandrille Lefèvre
- (United States) (Canada) Anthony Legendre
- (Canada) Pierre-Rudolph Mayard
- (Haiti) (Canada) Garven Metusala
- (Canada) Cristian Nuñez
- (Canada) Samuel Salter
- (Ivory Coast) (Canada) Abdul Binate
- (Algeria) (Canada) Rayane Yesli

Women

- (Canada) Savannah Chenail
- (Italy) (Canada) Kelly Chiavaro
- (Haiti) Roseline Éloissaint
- (Canada) Vanessa Grégoire
- (Canada) Sophie Guilmette
- (Canada) Nyota Katembo
- (France) Lisa Lebrun
- (Haiti) Jennyfer Limage
- (Canada) Mégane Sauvé
- (Armenia) (Canada) Natasha Tcheki-Jamgotchian
- (Canada) Lorie Thibault
- (Canada) Julianne Vallerand

=== Youth academy players ===
The following players transitioned from the A.S. Blainville youth system into the CF Montréal Academy:

- (Canada) Justin Auger
- (Canada) Dominik Lessard
- (Canada) Mikael Williams-Claudio
- (Canada) Zachary Fernandez
- (Canada) Zackiel Brault
- (Canada) Clément Bahiya
- (Canada) Samuel Pierre Lamarre
- (Canada) Tim Arnaud
- (Canada) Charles-Étienne Volcy
- (Canada) Sami Hamitouche
- (Canada) Loïc Provost
- (Canada) Maxine Lambert
- (Canada) David Seka
- (Canada) Savannah Chenail
- (Canada) Rose Proteau
- (Canada) Sandrine Brault
- (Canada) Alyssun Jeanzen
- (Canada) Odelya Belezamo
- (Canada) Mahely Caron
- (Canada) Yannick Laurent
- (Canada) Jesse Reda

== Notable former coaches ==
The following coaches have either played at the professional or international level, either before or after playing for the PLSQ team:

- (Romania) Robert Rositoiu: Led A.S. Blainville to multiple league titles and the League1 Canada Inter-Provincial Championship. In 2024, he was named the first head coach of the Northern Super League's Montreal franchise.
- (France) Maxime Leconte: Served as a long-time coach with the club before transitioning to professional academies and joining the first-team coaching staff at CF Montréal as an assistant coach in 2025.

== Honours ==
Men

- PLSQ Championship: 2017, 2018, 2019, 2020
- Coupe PLSQ: 2016, 2017, 2022, 2025

Women

- PLSQ Championship: 2020, 2021, 2022
- Coupe PLSQ: 2021, 2022
- Interprovincial Championship: 2022
