= FC Laval =

Semi-professional soccer club

- Full name: FC Laval Club de Soccer
- Founded: 1971/74 (as CS Fabrose); 2021 (as FC Laval)
- Stadium: Parc du Tremblay
- Head Coach: Amro Radwan
- League: Ligue1 Québec
- 2025: L1Q, 4th (men); L1Q, 2th; Playoffs: F (women)
- Website: www.fclaval.com
Home colours

FC Laval (formerly CS Fabrose) is a Canadian semi-professional soccer club based in Laval, Quebec that plays in Ligue1 Québec. In 2021, CS Fabrose merged with youth clubs CS Chomedey and Delta Laval to form FC Laval.

== History ==
=== CS Fabrose ===

The club was originally formed in 1971 following a merger of a few area clubs and adopted the name CS Fabrose, in 1974.

In 2018, the club joined the Première Ligue de soccer du Québec, a Division III league, fielding a team in the men's division. They played their first match on May 5 against CS Mont-Royal Outremont. They finished in seventh place out of eight teams in their inaugural season, but improved to 4th place in the 2019 season with Felipe Costa de Souza leading the league in goals scored with 13. However, despite only finishing fourth in the league, the club won the PLSQ League Cup, earning their first title, defeating CS Mont-Royal Outremont 2–0 in the final.

In 2019, they added a team in the women's division of the Première Ligue de soccer du Québec. While the 2020 season was initially interrupted due to the COVID-19 pandemic, the club was one of the teams that committed to fielding teams in both the male and female divisions for the shortened season, with the players agreeing to play without compensation. The women's team finished in second place after losing in the finals to AS Blainville in penalty kicks.

=== FC Laval ===
In 2021, CS Fabrose merged with youth clubs CS Chomedey and Delta Laval to form FC Laval (originally the name was set to be CS Laval-Ouest). The club completely overhauled their roster from the Fabrose side in 2020, with nearly a completely new roster, featuring many young players. In their first game as a new club, on July 4, 2021, they drew 2–2 against four-time defending champions AS Blainville. Ultimately they finished fourth in their maiden season as a new club.

In September 2021, they became the first club to partner and join CF Montréal's Scouting and Development Centre, where they will work in tandem on development of Laval's players.

In 2022, the club won the men's PLSQ, winning sixteen matches and losing only once in 22 matches, qualifying them to compete in the 2023 Canadian Championship. In 2024, they again won the league title to qualify for the 2025 Canadian Championship.

== Seasons ==
=== Men ===
as CS Fabrose

Season	League	Teams	Record	Rank	League Cup	Canadian Championship	Ref
2018	Première Ligue de soccer du Québec	8	7–5–4	7th	Quarter-finals	did not qualify	
2019	Première Ligue de soccer du Québec	9	3–4–9	4th	Champions	did not qualify	
2020 (Note: The 2020 season was cancelled before its conclusion, with the final standings determined on a points earned per game basis)	Première Ligue de soccer du Québec	6	1–0–5	6th	–	did not qualify	

as FC Laval

Season	League	Teams	Record	Rank	League Cup	Canadian Championship	Ref
2021	Première Ligue de soccer du Québec	10 (Note: Ottawa South United withdrew from the 2021 league mid-way through due to government restrictions, with their matches removed from the standings. Thus, Laval's draw against Ottawa is not included in their record.)	7–5–4	4th	–	did not qualify	
2022	Première Ligue de soccer du Québec	12	16–5–1	1st	Finalists	did not qualify	
2023	Ligue1 Québec	12	12–4–4	4th	Quarter-Finals	Preliminary round	
2024	Ligue1 Québec	11	12–3–5	1st	Quarter-finals	did not qualify	
2025	Ligue1 Québec	10	8–4–6	4th	Semi-finals	Preliminary round	

=== Women ===
as CS Fabrose

Season	League	Teams	Record	Rank	Playoffs	Ref
2019	Première Ligue de soccer du Québec	6	3–4–8	4th	–	
2020	Première Ligue de soccer du Québec	4	2–0–1	2nd	2nd	

as FC Laval

Season	League	Teams	Record	Rank	Playoffs	League Cup	Ref
2021	Première Ligue de soccer du Québec	10	1–0–8	9th	–	did not qualify	
2022	Première Ligue de soccer du Québec	12	7–1–3	4th	–	Semi-finals	
2023	Ligue1 Québec	12	3–3–5	8th	–	Finalists	
2024	Ligue1 Québec	12	8–4–4	3rd, Group A (5th overall)	did not qualify	–	
2025	Ligue1 Québec	10	8–1–4	1st, Group A (2nd overall)	Finalists	–	

== Notable former players ==
The following players have either played at the professional or international level, either before or after playing for the PLSQ team:

Men

- (Canada) Zakaria Bahous
- (Moldova) (Canada) Călin Calaidjoglu
- (Canada) Wandrille Lefèvre
- (Haiti) (Canada) Garven Metusala
- (Cameroon) Ernest Tchoupe

Women

- (Canada) Daphnée Blouin
- (Canada) Nyota Katembo
- (Canada) Karima Lemire
- (Haiti) (Canada) Laurie-Ann Moïse
- (Canada) Lysianne Proulx

== Honours ==
- PLSQ Champions (1): 2022
- Coupe PLSQ Winners (1): 2019
