= 2026 LS Pro Féminin season =

Women's football league season in Quebec, Canada

LS Pro Women's Division
- Season: 2026

The 2026 LS Pro season is the ninth season of play for LS Pro Féminin. It is the second season with multiple tiered divisions, and first with new branding for each division. LS Pro is a division three semi-professional soccer league in the Canadian soccer league system and the highest level of soccer based in the Canadian province of Québec.

== Changes from 2025 ==
Three new clubs have joined for the 2026 season (West Ottawa SC, Optimum de Victoriaville, and Cosmos de Granby) - all who will join in Ligue 3. CS Lanaudière-Nord, and FC Anjou departed the league. This season, the third tier, Ligue 3 will debut for the first time.

A LS Pro league cup will be introduced this season, to replace the Coupe L1Q, which featured only teams from the first division who qualified via league standings and was last held in 2023.

== Ligue 1 ==
Ligue 1
- Season: 2026

Ligue 1 Québec Féminin (also known as Ligue 1 QC Féminin) will increase to 12 clubs this season (ten from 2025, plus two promoted clubs - Lakeshore SC and CS St-Laurent, CS St-Hubert was relegated to Ligue 2 after being removed from the league mid-season in 2025). They will play each other once each for a total of 11 matches, before being split into two groups - Championship Group and Relegation Group. They will play each team in their new group once, with points from the first half carrying over. The bottom two teams from the Relegation Group will be relegated to Ligue 2 for 2027.

=== Teams ===
Team	City	Stadium	Head coach
A.S. Blainville	Blainville, Laurentides	Parc Blainville	Vincent Perret
AS Chaudière-Ouest	Lévis, Quebec	Parc Renaud-Maillette	Pierre Vereecke
Celtix du Haut-Richelieu	Saint-Jean-sur-Richelieu, Montérégie	Parc Pierre-Benoît	Simon Tchahou
AS Laval	Laval, Laval	Parc de Lausanne	Sean Rosa
FC Laval	Laval, Laval	Parc Berthiaume-du-Tremblay	Amro Radwan
CS Longueuil	Longueuil, Montérégie	Parc Laurier	Gilbert Bayiha
CS Mont-Royal Outremont	Mount Royal, Montréal	Parc Recreatif de TMR	Sid Mohamed Farah
CS Saint-Laurent	Saint-Laurent, Montreal	Vanier College Stadium	Peter Eustache
Lakeshore SC	Kirkland, Montréal	Parc des Bénévoles	Noureddine Lachhab
Ottawa South United	Ottawa, Ontario	George-Nelms Park	Vlad Vrsecky
CF Montréal Academy	Montreal, Montréal	Centre Nutrilait	Julie Casselman
Royal-Sélect de Beauport	Beauport, Quebec City	Stade Beauport	Michel Fischer

=== Standings ===
Pos	Team	Pld	W	D	L	GF	GA	GD	Pts	Relegation
1	A.S. Blainville (C)	16	11	4	1	29	11	+18	37	
2	CS Mont-Royal Outremont	16	10	2	4	35	12	+23	32	
3	Royal-Sélect de Beauport	16	8	6	2	20	7	+13	30	
4	CF Montréal Academy	16	6	5	5	24	23	+1	23	
5	AS Chaudière-Ouest	16	5	6	5	22	22	0	21	
6	Celtix du Haut-Richelieu	16	4	7	5	22	28	−6	19	
7	CS Longueuil	16	6	6	4	18	12	+6	24	
8	FC Laval	16	4	7	5	12	17	−5	19	
9	Ottawa South United	16	5	4	7	21	19	+2	18	
10	Lakeshore SC	16	3	5	8	13	23	−10	14	
11	CS Saint-Laurent (R)	16	3	2	11	10	33	−23	11	Relegation to 2027 Ligue2
12	AS Laval (R)	16	3	2	11	9	28	−19	11	Relegation to 2027 Ligue2

Source: LS Pro
(C) Champions; (R) Relegated

==== Statistics ====
Top goalscorers
(does not include Coupe du Québec)

Rank	Player	Club	Goals
1	Victoria Dupont	Celtix du Haut-Richelieu	11
2	Aaliyah Picquet	CF Montréal Academy	9
3	Celine Deraedt Sfyrogiannakis	AS Chaudière-Ouest	8
4	Mégane Gagnon	AS Blainville	6
4	Mélodie Lavigueur	Royal-Sélect de Beauport	6
6	Clémence Brunelle	CS Longueuil	5
6	Laurie-Ann Moïse	CS Mont-Royal Outremont	5
6	Magali Gagné	CS Mont-Royal Outremont	5
6	Maïka-Kim Guerrier	CF Montréal Academy	5
6	Rafaëlle Robitaille Bourgeois	AS Blainville	5
6	Rosa Maalouf	Ottawa South United	5

Source: Spordle

==== Awards ====
Award	Player (club)	Ref
Ballon d'or (Best Player)	Magali Gagné (CS Mont-Royal Outremont)	
Soulier D'Or (Golden Boot - Top Scorer)	Victoria Dupont (Celtix du Haut-Richelieu)	
Gant D'Or (Golden Glove - Top Goalkeeper)	Anaïs Marie-Luce (AS Blainville)	
Coach of the Year	Vincent Perret (AS Blainville)	

== Ligue 2 ==
Ligue 2
- Season: 2026

Ligue 2 Québec Féminin (also known as Ligue 2 QC Féminin) will feature 10 sides (a decrease from 19 last season), with the clubs who finished second to eleventh last year (excluding CS St-Laurent, who qualified for promotion), in addition to CS St-Hubert who were relegated from Ligue 1 after departing mid-season. They will play each other home and away for a total of 18 matches. The Champion will earn promotion to Ligue 1 and qualify for the Jubilee Trophy as Quebec's representative for the amateur national championships. The teams finishing second through fifth will qualify for the promotion playoffs. The bottom two teams will be relegated to Ligue 3 for 2027.

=== Teams ===
Team	City	2025 Result
Group A
CS St-Hubert	Saint-Hubert, Montérégie	Did not finish season, Ligue 1
CS Trident	Quebec City	2nd
AS Brossard	Brossard, Montérégie	3rd
CS Trois-Rivières	Trois-Rivières	4th
CS Boucherville	Boucherville	6th
CS LaSalle	Montréal	7th
CS Lévis-Est	Lévis	8th
Revolution FC	Saint-Eustache	9th
AS Gatineau	Gatineau, Outaouais	10th
CS Fury de Rimouski	Rimouski	11th

=== Standings ===
Pos	Team	Pld	W	D	L	GF	GA	GD	Pts	Qualification
1	CS LaSalle (C, P)	18	13	3	2	41	16	+25	42	Jubilee Trophy, Promoted to Ligue1
2	CS Trident (P)	18	13	1	4	33	16	+17	40	Qualified for Promotion Playoffs
3	CS St-Hubert (Note: Two matches played by AS Brossard (CS Boucherville 1–0 AS Brossard, CS St-Hubert 2–0 AS Brossard) were declared 3–0 forfeits due to AS Brossard's fielding of an ineligible player.)	18	10	3	5	26	14	+12	33	Qualified for Promotion Playoffs
4	CS Boucherville	18	8	5	5	28	15	+13	29	Qualified for Promotion Playoffs
5	CS Lévis-Est	18	8	2	8	24	31	−7	26	Qualified for Promotion Playoffs
6	AS Brossard	18	9	0	9	28	31	−3	25 (Note: AS Brossard were deducted two points for forfeits.)	
7	Revolution FC	18	6	4	8	20	22	−2	22	
8	AS Gatineau	18	4	4	10	14	23	−9	16	
9	CS Fury de Rimouski (R)	18	4	2	12	17	31	−14	14	Relegated to 2027 Ligue3
10	CS Trois-Rivières (R)	18	2	2	14	16	48	−32	8	Relegated to 2027 Ligue3

Source: Spordle
(C) Champions; (P) Promoted; (R) Relegated

=== Playoffs ===
- Semifinals
- August 23

- Final
- September 5

CS Trident
2

CS Lévis-Est
0

CS Trident (p)
2 (5)

CS St-Hubert
2 (4)

CS St-Hubert
2

CS Boucherville
0

=== Statistics ===
Top goalscorers
(includes playoffs; does not include Coupe du Québec)

Rank	Player	Club	Goals
1	Allie Martin	CS LaSalle	9
1	Ashley Burdick	CS LaSalle	9
1	Skye Cuscuna	AS Brossard	9
4	Émy Desharnais	CS Trident	8
5	Arielle Boudreau	CS Trois-Rivières	7
5	Elizabeth Viel	CS Trident	7
5	Florence Delisle	CS Trident	7
8	Emma Donovan	CS Lévis-Est	6
9	8 players		5

Source: PPL

==== Awards ====
Award	Player (club)	Ref
Ballon d'or (Best Player)	Emma Liagridonis (CS LaSalle)	
Soulier D'Or (Golden Boot - Top Scorer)	Allie Martin (CS LaSalle)	
Gant D'Or (Golden Glove - Top Goalkeeper)	Kelly Cantin (CS Boucherville)	

== Ligue 3 ==
Ligue 3
- Season: 2026

Ligue 3 Québec Féminin (also known as Ligue 3 QC Féminin) will operate for the first time this season. It will feature nine clubs (the clubs who finished 12th through 17th last season, plus three new entrants - Optimum de Victoriaville, Cosmos de Granby, and West Ottawa SC. The 18th and 19th place finishers - FC Anjou and CS Lanaudière-Nord did not return from last season.

=== Teams ===
Team	City	2025 Result
Current teams
CS Union Lanaudière Sud	Repentigny	12th, Ligue 2
CS du Bas-Richelieu	Sorel-Tracy	13th, Ligue 2
CS Mistral de Sherbrooke	Sherbrooke	14th, Ligue 2
CS Roussillon	Saint-Constant	15th, Ligue 2
CF L'International de Québec	Quebec City	16th, Ligue 2
CS Phénix des Rivières	Quebec City	17th, Ligue 2
CS les Cosmos de Granby	Granby	New team
CS Optimum de Victoriaville	Victoriaville	New team
West Ottawa SC	Ottawa, Ontario	New team

=== Standings ===
Pos	Team	Pld	W	D	L	GF	GA	GD	Pts	Qualification
1	West Ottawa SC (C, P)	16	14	1	1	67	5	+62	43	Promoted to Ligue2
2	CS Optimum de Victoriaville (P)	16	11	3	2	47	25	+22	36	Qualified for Promotion Playoffs
3	CS Mistral de Sherbrooke	16	9	1	6	26	25	+1	28	Qualified for Promotion Playoffs
4	CS Roussillon	16	7	3	6	35	29	+6	24	Qualified for Promotion Playoffs
5	CS du Bas-Richelieu	16	6	4	6	17	27	−10	22	Qualified for Promotion Playoffs
6	CF L'International de Québec	16	4	3	9	26	36	−10	15 (Note: CF L'International de Québec finished ahead of CS les Cosmos de Granby on head-to head points: CS les Cosmos de Granby 0–6 CF L'International de Québec, CF L'International de Québec 0–0 CS les Cosmos de Granby.)	
7	CS les Cosmos de Granby	16	3	6	7	15	29	−14	15	
8	CS Union Lanaudière Sud	16	2	6	8	20	34	−14	12	
9	CS Phénix des Rivières (R)	16	1	3	12	10	53	−43	6	Relegated to Interregional division

Source: Spordle
(C) Champions; (P) Promoted; (R) Relegated

=== Playoffs ===
- Semifinals
- August 23

- Final
- September 5

CS Optimum de Victoriaville
3

CS du Bas-Richelieu
2

CS Optimum de Victoriaville (a.e.t.)
3

CS Roussillon
2

CS Mistral de Sherbrooke
2

CS Roussillon
3

=== Statistics ===
Top goalscorers
(includes playoffs; does not include Coupe du Québec)

Rank	Player	Club	Goals
1	Seema Sakran	West Ottawa SC	20
2	Gracie Somers	West Ottawa SC	14
3	Aurélie Champagne	CS Roussillon	12
4	Alexane Beaudin	CS Roussillon	9
4	Kelly-Ann Labrie	CS Optimum de Victoriaville	9
4	Laurie Theriault	CS Optimum de Victoriaville	9
7	Audrey-Anne Desbiens	CS Mistral de Sherbrooke	8
7	Ève-Marie Giroux	CF L'International de Québec	8
9	Rafaelle Emond	CS Roussillon	7
9	Sandrine Blanchette	CS Optimum de Victoriaville	7

Source: LS Pro

==== Awards ====
Award	Player (club)	Ref
Ballon d'or (Best Player)	Seema Sakran (West Ottawa SC)	
Soulier D'Or (Golden Boot - Top Scorer)	Seema Sakran (West Ottawa SC)	
Gant D'Or (Golden Glove - Top Goalkeeper)	Chloe Lachance-Soulard (West Ottawa SC)	

== Coupe du Québec Senior ==
Soccer Quebec will be running the Coupe du Québec Senior to replace the Coupe L1Q. The cup will feature all teams from Ligue 1, Ligue 2, and Ligue 3 (except CF Montreal Academy) as well as two clubs from the lower level Interregional division (CS Lanaudière-Nord and CS Arsenal de Chambly). The 32 teams will be divided into 8 groups of four teams. The top two teams in each group advance to the round of 16.

=== Group Stage ===
Group A

Pos	Team	Pld	W	D	L	GF	GA	GD	Pts	Qualification
1	Royal-Sélect de Beauport (L1Q)	3	3	0	0	9	1	+8	9	Advance to knockout stage
2	CS Trois-Rivières (L2Q)	3	2	0	1	10	8	+2	6	Advance to knockout stage
3	CF L'International de Québec (L3Q)	3	1	0	2	7	10	−3	3	
4	CS Lévis-Est (L2Q)	3	0	0	3	4	11	−7	0	

Source: Spordle

Group B

Pos	Team	Pld	W	D	L	GF	GA	GD	Pts	Qualification
1	Ottawa South United (L1Q)	3	2	1	0	9	0	+9	7	Advance to knockout stage
2	West Ottawa SC (L3Q)	3	1	2	0	2	1	+1	5	Advance to knockout stage
3	Lakeshore SC (L1Q)	3	1	1	1	7	5	+2	4	
4	AS Gatineau (L2Q)	3	0	0	3	1	13	−12	0	

Source: Spordle

Group C

Pos	Team	Pld	W	D	L	GF	GA	GD	Pts	Qualification
1	FC Laval (L1Q)	3	3	0	0	20	0	+20	9	Advance to knockout stage
2	AS Laval (L1Q)	3	2	0	1	11	4	+7	6	Advance to knockout stage
3	CS Union Lanaudière Sud (L3Q)	3	1	0	2	7	8	−1	3	
4	CS Lanaudière-Nord (LDIR)	3	0	0	3	0	26	−26	0	

Source: Spordle

Group D

Pos	Team	Pld	W	D	L	GF	GA	GD	Pts	Qualification
1	CS Boucherville (L2Q)	3	2	1	0	4	1	+3	7	Advance to knockout stage
2	CS Longueuil (L1Q)	3	2	0	1	5	1	+4	6	Advance to knockout stage
3	CS du Bas-Richelieu (L3Q)	3	1	1	1	4	5	−1	4	
4	CS Optimum de Victoriaville (L3Q)	3	0	0	3	1	7	−6	0	

Source: Spordle

Group E

Pos	Team	Pld	W	D	L	GF	GA	GD	Pts	Qualification
1	CS Mont-Royal Outremont (L1Q)	3	3	0	0	12	3	+9	9	Advance to knockout stage
2	CS St-Hubert (L2Q)	3	1	1	1	4	6	−2	4	Advance to knockout stage
3	CS LaSalle (L2Q)	3	1	1	1	4	6	−2	4	
4	CS Roussilion (L3Q)	3	0	0	3	2	7	−5	0	

Source: Spordle

Group F

Pos	Team	Pld	W	D	L	GF	GA	GD	Pts	Qualification
1	AS Blainville (L1Q)	3	3	0	0	15	2	+13	9	Advance to knockout stage
2	Revolution FC (L2Q)	3	2	0	1	5	5	0	6	Advance to knockout stage
3	CS Saint-Laurent (L1Q)	3	1	0	2	3	4	−1	3	
4	CS Arsenal de Chambly (LDIR)	3	0	0	3	1	13	−12	0	

Source: Spordle

Group G

Pos	Team	Pld	W	D	L	GF	GA	GD	Pts	Qualification
1	CS Trident (L2Q)	3	3	0	0	12	2	+10	9	Advance to knockout stage
2	AS Chaudière-Ouest (L1Q)	3	2	0	1	9	3	+6	6	Advance to knockout stage
3	CS Fury de Rimouski (L2Q)	3	1	0	2	5	7	−2	3	
4	CS Phénix des Rivières (L3Q)	3	0	0	3	2	16	−14	0	

Source: Spordle

Group H

Pos	Team	Pld	W	D	L	GF	GA	GD	Pts	Qualification
1	Celtix du Haut-Richelieu (L1Q)	3	3	0	0	20	1	+19	9	Advance to knockout stage
2	CS Mistral de Sherbrooke (L3Q)	3	2	0	1	8	12	−4	6	Advance to knockout stage
3	AS Brossard (L2Q)	3	1	0	2	9	8	+1	3	
4	CS les Cosmos de Granby (L3Q)	3	0	0	3	1	17	−16	0	

Source: Spordle

=== Knockout Stage ===
- Round of 16
- July 22 – August 5

- Quarterfinals
- August 11–15

- Semifinals
- August 25–26

- Final
- September 5

L1Q
Royal-Sélect de Beauport
3

L2Q
CS St-Hubert
0

L1Q
Royal-Sélect de Beauport (w/o)
3

L1Q
Ottawa South United
0

L1Q
Ottawa South United (p)
0 (5)

L2Q
Revolution FC
0 (4)

L1Q
Royal-Sélect de Beauport
4

L1Q
AS Chaudière-Ouest
0

L1Q
FC Laval
0

L1Q
AS Chaudière-Ouest
2

L1Q
AS Chaudière-Ouest
3

L2Q
CS Boucherville
1

L2Q
CS Boucherville
3

L3Q
CS Mistral de Sherbrooke
1

L1Q
Royal-Sélect de Beauport (p)
2 (3)

L1Q
CS Mont-Royal Outremont
2 (2)

L1Q
CS Mont-Royal Outremont
5

L2Q
CS Trois-Rivières
0

L1Q
CS Mont-Royal Outremont (a.e.t.)
5

L1Q
AS Blainville
3

L1Q
AS Blainville
4

L3Q
West Ottawa SC
2

L1Q
CS Mont-Royal Outremont
4

L1Q
Celtix du Haut-Richelieu
0

L2Q
CS Trident
2

L1Q
AS Laval
1

L2Q
CS Trident
2

L1Q
Celtix du Haut-Richelieu
3

L1Q
Celtix du Haut-Richelieu
1

L1Q
CS Longueuil
0

== Ligue Espoirs (U21) ==
LS Pro will again run a reserve division. There will be two divisions. Division 1 will feature U21 sides from all Ligue 1 clubs. Division 2 will feature U21 clubs from seven of the ten Ligue 2 clubs.

=== Division 1 ===
Pos	Team	Pld	W	D	L	GF	GA	GD	Pts
1	Royal-Sélect de Beauport U21	16	12	3	1	50	9	+41	39
2	CF Montréal Academy	16	11	3	2	60	10	+50	36
3	AS Blainville U21	16	11	2	3	47	17	+30	35
4	CS Longueuil U21	16	10	1	5	37	21	+16	31
5	Lakeshore SC U21	16	8	4	4	35	22	+13	28
6	Celtix du Haut-Richelieu U21	16	7	4	5	33	35	−2	25
7	CS Saint-Laurent U21	16	7	3	6	33	34	−1	24
8	Ottawa South United U21	16	5	2	9	21	32	−11	15 (Note: 2 points deducted due to forfeits of games vs Royal-Sélect de Beauport and Lakeshore SC. The matches were not played and awarded as 3-0 victories.)
9	FC Laval U21	16	4	1	11	17	39	−22	13
10	AS Laval U21	16	4	1	11	17	47	−30	12 (Note: 1 point deducted due to forfeit of game vs AS Chaudière-Ouest)
11	AS Chaudière-Ouest U21	16	2	3	11	9	54	−45	9
12	CS Mont-Royal Outremont U21	16	1	1	14	13	52	−39	3 (Note: 1 point deducted due to forfeit of game vs CF Montreal due to the fielding of an ineligible player. The match ended in a 4-0 victory for CF Montreal)

Source: Spordle

=== Division 2 ===
Pos	Team	Pld	W	D	L	GF	GA	GD	Pts
1	Revolution FC U21 (Note: The game between CS St-Hubert and Revolution FC initially ended in a 2–0 victory for Revolution but was later turned into a 3–0 forfeit win in favour of Revolution due to the fielding of an ineligible player)	18	13	3	2	42	11	+31	42
2	CS St-Hubert U21	18	12	2	4	44	19	+25	37 (Note: 1 point deducted due to forfeit of game vs Revolution FC)
3	CS Boucherville U21	18	9	5	4	34	20	+14	32
4	CS Trident U21	18	7	4	7	23	25	−2	25
5	CS LaSalle U21	18	6	5	7	28	23	+5	23
6	CS Trois-Rivières U21	18	4	3	11	20	53	−33	15
7	CS Lévis-Est U21	18	1	0	17	16	56	−40	3

Source: Spordle

=== Awards ===
Award	D1	D2	Ref
Ballon d'or (Best Player)	Nelly Béliveau (RS Beauport)	Alexiane Simard (Revolution FC)	
Soulier D'Or (Golden Boot - Top Scorer)	Samuelle Hebert (CS St-Laurent)	Alexiane Simard (Revolution FC)	
Gant D'Or (Golden Glove - Top Goalkeeper)	Béatrice Forcier (CF Montreal Academy)	Éloise Lamontagne (CS Trident)	
