= 2026 LS Pro season =

Football league season in Quebec, Canada

LS Pro Men's Division
- Season: 2026

The 2026 LS Pro season was the fifteenth season of play for LS Pro. It was the second season with multiple tiered divisions, and first with new branding for each division. LS Pro is a division three semi-professional soccer league in the Canadian soccer league system and the highest level of soccer based in the Canadian province of Québec.

CS Saint-Laurent competed in the 2026 Canadian Championship as the league's representative as 2025 league champions.

== Changes from 2025 ==
Six new clubs joined Ligue3 for the 2026 season (West Ottawa SC, Optimum de Victoriaville, Cosmos de Granby, Soccer Pointe Claire, AS Saint Lambert, and Dollard SC). CS Lanaudière-Nord, CS Braves d'Ahuntsic, and FC Anjou, as well as the four B teams (AS Laval B, Celtix du Haut-Richelieu B, CS Mont-Royal Outremont B, and CS Longueuil B) departed the league.

The Coupe L1Q was replaced by the Coupe du Quebec, open to all clubs in LS Pro, which was previously open to clubs from Ligue2 and below, and included clubs from the lower interregional divisions as well.

== Ligue1 ==
Ligue1
- Season: 2026

Ligue 1 Québec Masculin (also known as Ligue 1 QC Masculin) increased to 12 clubs from ten last season (ten from 2025, plus two promoted clubs — CS LaSalle and AS Gatineau). Teams played each other home and away for a total of 22 matches. The league winner, FC Laval, qualified for the 2027 Canadian Championship, while the bottom two sides were relegated to Ligue2.

=== Teams ===
Team	City	Stadium	2025 result
A.S. Blainville	Blainville, Laurentides	Parc Blainville	6th
Celtix du Haut-Richelieu	Saint-Jean-sur-Richelieu, Montérégie	Parc Pierre-Benoît	7th
AS Gatineau	Gatineau, Outaouais		2nd, Ligue2 (Promoted)
CS LaSalle	Montréal, Montréal		1st, Ligue2 (Promoted)
AS Laval	Laval, Laval	Parc de Lausanne	2nd
FC Laval	Laval, Laval	Parc Berthiaume-Du Tremblay Stade	4th
CS Longueuil	Longueuil, Montérégie	Parc Laurier	10th
CS Mont-Royal Outremont	Mount Royal, Montréal	Parc Recreatif de TMR	5th
CS Saint-Laurent	Montréal, Montréal	Vanier College Stadium	1st
CS St-Hubert	Longueuil, Montérégie	Centre Sportif Roseanne-Laflamme	8th
Ottawa South United	Ottawa, Ontario	George Nelms Sports Park	9th
Royal-Sélect de Beauport	Québec, Capitale-Nationale	Stade Beauport	3rd

=== Standings ===
Pos	Team	Pld	W	D	L	GF	GA	GD	Pts	Qualification
1	FC Laval (C)	22	14	5	3	40	22	+18	47	2027 Canadian Championship
2	CS Saint-Laurent	22	13	6	3	48	27	+21	45	
3	Ottawa South United	22	11	2	9	34	33	+1	35	
4	AS Laval	22	10	4	8	30	34	−4	34	
5	Royal-Sélect de Beauport	22	9	6	7	46	44	+2	33	
6	AS Gatineau	22	9	4	9	36	26	+10	31	
7	AS Blainville	22	8	5	9	17	17	0	29	
8	CS LaSalle	22	6	7	9	27	31	−4	25	
9	Celtix du Haut-Richelieu	22	6	6	10	34	38	−4	24	
10	CS St-Hubert	22	6	5	11	34	40	−6	23 (Note: Tied on head-to-head results (CS Longueuil 1–2 CS St-Hubert, CS St-Hubert 3–4 CS Longueuil). Overall goal difference was used as the tiebreaker.)	
11	CS Longueuil (R)	22	6	5	11	23	30	−7	23	Relegated to 2027 Ligue2
12	CS Mont-Royal Outremont (R)	22	4	5	13	22	49	−27	17	Relegated to 2027 Ligue2

Source: LS Pro
(C) Champions; (R) Relegated

==== Statistics ====
Top goalscorers
(does not include Coupe Ligue1 Québec)

Rank	Player	Club	Goals
1	Abdulazeez Hammood Lazam	Ottawa South United	17
2	Arthur Polla	AS Gatineau	14
2	Marc-Alexandre Happi Emaga	FC Laval	11
4	Lukumbi Tshindaye	Royal-Sélect de Beauport	9
4	Gabriel Wiethaeuper-Balbinotti	CS Longueuil / CS St-Laurent (Note: Balbinotti scored 3 goals in 8 matches for CS Longueuil, before joining CS St-Laurent, scoring 6 goals in 8 matches)	9
6	Cleberson Dormevil	CS LaSalle	7
6	Marco Marinaro	CS St-Hubert	7
6	Matthew Catavolo	CS St-Laurent	7
6	Montacer El Harchali	FC Laval	7
6	Mujtaba Mirhasan	CS St-Hubert	7
6	Olivier Sylvain	CS St-Hubert	7
6	Younesse El Mehdi Chibane	CS St-Laurent	7
6	Zakaria Bahous	CS St-Laurent	7

Source: Spordle

==== Awards ====
Award	Player (club)	Ref
Ballon d'or (Best Player)	Abdulazeez Hammood Lazam (Ottawa South United)	
Soulier D'Or (Golden Boot – Top Scorer)	Abdulazeez Hammood Lazam (Ottawa South United)	
Gant D'Or (Golden Glove – Top Goalkeeper)	Aydan Kancel-Marie (FC Laval)	

== Ligue2 ==
Ligue2
- Season: 2026

Ligue 2 Québec Masculin (also known as Ligue 2 QC Masculin) featured 12 sides (a decrease from 24 last season), with the clubs who finished third to fourteenth last year returning for the 2026 season. Teams were divided into two groups of six, where they faced each team in their group home and away, as well as the six teams from the other group once each, for a total of 16 matches. Both group winners were promoted to Ligue1 for 2027 and faced each other for the Ligue2 title, with the winner qualifying for the Challenge Trophy national amateur championship. The bottom finisher of each group was relegated to Ligue3.

=== Teams ===
Team	City	2025 Result
Group A
Lakeshore SC	Kirkland, Montréal	3rd
CS Rivière-des-Prairies	Montréal, Montréal	6th
AS Chaudière-Ouest	Lévis, Chaudière-Appalaches	7th
CS Trident	Québec, Capitale-Nationale	10th
CS Mistral de Sherbrooke	Sherbrooke, Estrie	11th
CS Roussilion	Saint-Constant, Montérégie	14th
Group B
CS Montréal Centre	Montréal, Montréal	4th
Revolution FC	Saint-Eustache, Laurentides	5th
CS Saint-Lazare/Hudson	Saint-Lazare, Montérégie	8th
CS Union Lanaudière Sud	Repentigny, Lanaudière	9th
CF L'International de Québec	Québec, Capitale-Nationale	12th
Panellinios St Michel FC	Montréal, Montréal	13th

=== Standings ===
==== Group A ====
Pos	Team	Pld	W	D	L	GF	GA	GD	Pts	Qualification
1	CS Trident (C, P)	16	11	0	5	29	21	+8	33	Advance to Final, Promoted to 2027 Ligue1
2	Lakeshore SC	16	9	4	3	34	19	+15	31	
3	AS Chaudière-Ouest	16	7	1	8	22	21	+1	22	
4	CS Roussilion (Note: The game between CS Roussillon and Mistral de Sherbrooke initially ended in a 1–0 victory for Roussillon but was later turned into a 3–0 forfeit win in favour of Roussillon due to the fielding of an ineligible player)	16	5	2	9	18	28	−10	17	
5	CS Rivière-des-Prairies	16	3	5	8	27	33	−6	14	
6	CS Mistral de Sherbrooke (R)	16	4	0	12	13	34	−21	11 (Note: 1 point deducted due to forfeit of game vs CS Roussilion)	Relegated to 2027 Ligue3

Source: Spordle
(C) Champions; (P) Promoted; (R) Relegated

==== Group B ====
Pos	Team	Pld	W	D	L	GF	GA	GD	Pts	Qualification
1	CF L'International de Québec (P)	16	10	3	3	20	12	+8	33	Advance to Final, Promoted to 2027 Ligue1
2	Revolution FC	16	7	5	4	28	15	+13	26	
3	CS Saint-Lazare/Hudson	16	7	2	7	19	24	−5	23 (Note: CS Saint-Lazare/Hudson finished ahead of CS Union Lanaudière Sud on head-to-head points: CS Saint-Lazare/Hudson 3–2 CS Union Lanaudière Sud, CS Union Lanaudière Sud 0–1 CS Saint-Lazare/Hudson.)	
4	CS Union Lanaudière Sud	16	7	2	7	22	23	−1	23	
5	Panellinios St Michel FC	16	7	1	8	28	19	+9	22	
6	CS Montréal Centre (R)	16	4	5	7	22	33	−11	17	Relegated to 2027 Ligue3

Source: Spordle
(P) Promoted; (R) Relegated

==== Championship Final ====
August 22
19:00 EDT

CF L'International de Québec	1–2	CS Trident
Bonneau Desmeules 16'	Report	Rwagasana 40'; Saenz Ospina 79'

Patro de Charlesbourg, Quebec City
Referee: Andrew Buciora

==== Statistics ====
Top goalscorers
(Include Ligue2 Championship Final; does not include Coupe du Québec)

Rank	Player	Club	Goals
1	Elliot Lachance	CS Trident	12
2	Abderaouf Belkhaoui	Panellinios St Michel FC	9
2	Adam Libera	Lakeshore SC	9
2	Samuel Valade	CS Mistral de Sherbrooke	9
5	Doudou Alfred Rwagasana	CS Trident	7
6	Alex Fleury	Lakeshore SC	6
6	Mahdi Abbassi	CS Rivière-des-Prairies	6
6	Marc-Olivier Kouo Dibongue	CF L'International de Québec	6
9	9 players		5

Source: Spordle

==== Awards ====
Award	Player (club)	Ref
Ballon d'or (Best Player)	Yann Le Roy (CF L'International de Québec)	
Soulier D'Or (Golden Boot – Top Scorer)	Elliot Lachance (CS Trident)	
Gant D'Or (Golden Glove – Top Goalkeeper)	Manuel Gaouette (CS Trident)	
Coach of the Year	Nicolas Possetti (CS Trident)	

== Ligue3 ==
Ligue3
- Season: 2026

Ligue 3 Québec Masculin (also known as Ligue 3 QC Masculin) featured 25 sides (the relegated clubs from Ligue2, all remaining Ligue3 sides from 2025, and the new entrants). The teams were split into two conferences, with each conference divided into two divisions. All divisions had six clubs, except for one which had have seven. Each club faced their division home and away, plus the teams in the other division in their conference once, resulting in 16, 17, or 18 matches depending on the division. The top two sides of each division qualified for the playoffs, with the champion and runner-up earning promotion to Ligue2. The last place team in each division was demoted to their interregional group, with the aim of having 24 teams in the coming years.

=== Teams ===
Team	City	2025 Result
Group A
North division
CS Les Ambassadeurs de Saint-Jérôme	Saint-Jérôme, Laurentides	18th, Ligue2 (relegated)
FC Boréal	Prévost, Laurentides	22nd, Ligue2 (relegated)
CS Titans	Bois-des-Filion, Laurentides	8th, Ligue3
CS Blizz'Or (Vallée de l'Or)	Val-d'Or, Abitibi-Témiscamingue	14th, Ligue3
Soccer Pointe-Claire	Pointe-Claire, Montréal	New team
Dollard SC	Dollard-des-Ormeaux, Montréal	New team
Centre division
AS St-Léonard	Montréal, Montréal	19th, Ligue2 (relegated)
AS Brossard	Brossard, Montérégie	24th, Ligue2 (relegated)
FS Salaberry	Montréal, Montréal	9th, Ligue3
Notre-Dame-de-Grâce SA	Montréal, Montréal	16th, Ligue3
AS Saint Lambert	Saint-Lambert, Montérégie	New team
West Ottawa SC	Ottawa, Ontario	New team
Group B
South division
CS Trois-Rivières	Trois-Rivières, Mauricie	16th, Ligue2 (relegated)
AS Montis	Saint-Bruno-de-Montarville, Montérégie	20th, Ligue2 (relegated)
CS Boucherville	Boucherville, Montérégie	23rd, Ligue2 (relegated)
Chevaliers NDMC	Notre-Dame-du-Mont-Carmel, Mauricie	7th, Ligue3
CS les Cosmos de Granby	Granby, Estrie	New team
CS Optimum de Victoriaville	Victoriaville, Centre-du-Québec	New team
East division
CS Phénix des Rivières	Québec, Capitale-Nationale	15th, Ligue2 (relegated)
CS Lévis-Est	Lévis, Chaudière-Appalaches	17th, Ligue2 (relegated)
CS Fury de Rimouski	Rimouski, Bas-Saint-Laurent	2nd, Ligue3
CS Boréal d'Alma	Alma, Saguenay–Lac-Saint-Jean	3rd, Ligue3
CS Venturi de Saguenay	Saguenay, Saguenay–Lac-Saint-Jean	4th, Ligue3
CS Mondial de Rivière-du-Loup	Rivière-du-Loup, Bas-Saint-Laurent	6th, Ligue3
CS Haute-Saint-Charles	Québec, Capitale-Nationale	10th, Ligue3

=== Standings ===
==== Group A ====
===== Northwest Division =====
Pos	Team	Pld	W	D	L	GF	GA	GD	Pts	Qualification
1	CS Les Ambassadeurs de Saint-Jérôme (P)	16	11	2	3	42	18	+24	35	Advance to playoffs
2	CS Titans	16	7	4	5	25	28	−3	25	Advance to playoffs
3	Soccer Pointe-Claire	16	5	4	7	19	30	−11	19	
4	FC Boréal	16	5	2	9	17	31	−14	17	
5	Dollard SC	16	2	3	11	11	39	−28	9	
6	CS Blizz'Or (R)	16	2	2	12	10	33	−23	7 (Note: CS Blizz'Or were deducted one point for a forfeit.)	Relegated to Interregional divisions

Source: Spordle
(P) Promoted; (R) Relegated

===== Centre Division =====
Pos	Team	Pld	W	D	L	GF	GA	GD	Pts	Qualification
1	West Ottawa SC (P)	16	12	2	2	66	11	+55	38	Advance to playoffs
2	AS St-Léonard	16	9	6	1	37	15	+22	33	Advance to playoffs
3	Notre-Dame-de-Grâce SA	16	7	4	5	17	27	−10	25	
4	FS Salaberry	16	6	4	6	28	25	+3	22	
5	AS Brossard	16	4	6	6	16	26	−10	18 (Note: AS Brossard finished ahead of AS Saint-Lambert on head-to-head points: AS Brossard 1–1 AS Saint-Lambert, AS Saint-Lambert 0–1 AS Brossard.)	
6	AS Saint-Lambert (R)	16	5	3	8	29	34	−5	18	Relegated to Interregional divisions

Source: Spordle
(P) Promoted; (R) Relegated

==== Group B ====
===== South Division =====
Pos	Team	Pld	W	D	L	GF	GA	GD	Pts	Qualification
1	CS Optimum de Victoriaville	17	11	3	3	51	22	+29	36	Advance to playoffs
2	CS les Cosmos de Granby	17	8	4	5	32	21	+11	28	Advance to playoffs
3	AS Montis	17	7	1	9	32	43	−11	22	
4	CS Trois-Rivières	17	5	4	8	22	31	−9	19	
5	CS Boucherville	17	4	6	7	26	36	−10	18	
6	Chevaliers NDMC (R)	17	4	4	9	32	49	−17	16	Relegated to Interregional divisions

Source: Spordle
(R) Relegated

===== East Division =====
Pos	Team	Pld	W	D	L	GF	GA	GD	Pts	Qualification
1	CS Phénix des Rivières	18	11	5	2	45	18	+27	38	Advance to playoffs
2	CS Lévis-Est	18	11	2	5	48	29	+19	35	Advance to playoffs
3	CS Boréal d'Alma	18	9	4	5	41	25	+16	31	
4	CS Venturi de Saguenay	18	8	5	5	38	34	+4	29	
5	CS Mondial de Rivière-du-Loup	18	7	1	10	30	46	−16	22	
6	CS Fury de Rimouski	18	4	6	8	28	36	−8	18	
7	CS Haute-Saint-Charles (R)	18	2	1	15	23	58	−35	6 (Note: CS Haute-Saint-Charles were deducted one point for a forfeit.)	Relegated to Interregional divisions

Source: Spordle
(R) Relegated

=== Playoffs ===
==== Path A ====
- Semifinals
- August 23

- Final
- September 7

CS Les Ambassadeurs de Saint-Jérôme
3

AS St-Léonard
2

CS Les Ambassadeurs de Saint-Jérôme (p)
2 (4)

CS Optimum de Victoriaville
2 (2)

CS Optimum de Victoriaville (a.e.t.)
2

CS Lévis-Est
0

==== Path B ====
- Semifinals
- August 23

- Final
- September 7

West Ottawa SC (w/o)
4

CS Titans
0

West Ottawa SC (a.e.t.)
2

CS les Cosmos de Granby
1

CS Phénix des Rivières
1

CS les Cosmos de Granby (a.e.t.)
2

==== Statistics ====
Top goalscorers
(Include Ligue3 Playoffs; does not include Coupe du Québec)

Rank	Player	Club	Goals
1	Florent Dubois-Levesque	AS Montis	17
2	Yann-Cedric Foka-Tatache	CS Les Ambassadeurs de Saint-Jérôme	16
3	Philippe Larocque	CS Phénix des Rivières	15
4	Damiano Totten	West Ottawa SC	14
5	Cameron Shaw	West Ottawa SC	11
5	Mohamed Bouzidi	West Ottawa SC	11
7	Alexander Saad	FS Salaberry	10
7	Zachary Binette	CS Optimum de Victoriaville	10
9	Antony Adam Côté	CS Optimum de Victoriaville	9
9	Jorgen Ulloa-Aguilar	AS St-Léonard	9
9	Mathiel Dufour	FC Boréal	9

Source: Spordle

==== Awards ====
Award	Group A	Group B	Ref
Ballon d'or (Best Player)	Yann-Cedric Foka-Tatache (CS Les Ambassadeurs de Saint-Jérôme)	Antony Adam Côté (CS Optimum de Victoriaville)	
Soulier D'Or (Golden Boot – Top Scorer)	Yann-Cedric Foka-Tatache (CS Les Ambassadeurs de Saint-Jérôme)	Florent Dubois-Levesque (AS Montis)	
Gant D'Or (Golden Glove – Top Goalkeeper)	Benjamin Audet (CS Les Ambassadeurs de Saint-Jérôme)	Nicolas Sierra Acosta (CS Optimum de Victoriaville)	

== Coupe du Québec Senior ==
Soccer Quebec ran the Coupe du Québec Senior to replace the Coupe L1Q. The cup featured all teams from Ligue1, Ligue2, and Ligue3 (except CS Montreal Centre) as well as four clubs from the lower level Interregional division (CS Mercier-Hochelaga-Maisonneuve, Inter Montréal FC, FC Loro, and FC Gatineau). The 52 teams were divided into 13 groups of four teams. The top two teams in each group and the six best third-placed teams advanced to the round of 32.

=== Group Stage ===
Group A

Pos	Team	Pld	W	D	L	GF	GA	GD	Pts	Qualification
1	AS Laval (L1Q)	3	3	0	0	13	1	+12	9	Advance to knockout stage
2	CS Mercier-Hochelaga-Maisonneuve (LDIR)	3	1	1	1	6	5	+1	4	Advance to knockout stage
3	Notre-Dame-de-Grâce SA (L3Q)	3	1	0	2	3	7	−4	3	
4	CS Rivière-des-Prairies (L2Q)	3	0	1	2	2	11	−9	1	

Source: Spordle

Group B

Pos	Team	Pld	W	D	L	GF	GA	GD	Pts	Qualification
1	AS Brossard (L3Q)	3	2	0	1	7	4	+3	6 (Note: Head-to-head result: AS Brossard 1–0 CS St-Hubert.)	Advance to knockout stage
2	CS St-Hubert (L1Q)	3	2	0	1	6	1	+5	6	Advance to knockout stage
3	AS Saint Lambert (L3Q)	3	1	1	1	4	5	−1	4	Advance to knockout stage
4	CS Boucherville (L3Q)	3	0	1	2	6	13	−7	1	

Source: Spordle
Notes:

Group C

Pos	Team	Pld	W	D	L	GF	GA	GD	Pts	Qualification
1	Royal-Sélect de Beauport (L1Q)	3	3	0	0	14	1	+13	9	Advance to knockout stage
2	CS Optimum de Victoriaville (L3Q)	3	1	1	1	5	3	+2	4 (Note: Tied on head-to-head result (CF L'International de Québec 1–1 CS Optimum de Victoriaville). Overall goal difference was used as the tiebreaker.)	Advance to knockout stage
3	CF L'International de Québec (L2Q)	3	1	1	1	6	6	0	4	Advance to knockout stage
4	CS Haute-Saint-Charles (L3Q)	3	0	0	3	1	16	−15	0	

Source: Spordle
Notes:

Group D

Pos	Team	Pld	W	D	L	GF	GA	GD	Pts	Qualification
1	CS Trident (L2Q)	3	2	1	0	7	4	+3	7	Advance to knockout stage
2	CS Venturi de Saguenay (L3Q)	3	1	1	1	7	7	0	4	Advance to knockout stage
3	CS Boréal d'Alma (L3Q)	3	1	0	2	6	6	0	3 (Note: Head-to-head result: CS Boréal d'Alma 3–0 CS Phénix des Rivières.)	Advance to knockout stage
4	CS Phénix des Rivières (L3Q)	3	1	0	2	4	7	−3	3	

Source: Spordle
Notes:

Group E

Pos	Team	Pld	W	D	L	GF	GA	GD	Pts	Qualification
1	AS Blainville (L1Q)	3	3	0	0	9	1	+8	9	Advance to knockout stage
2	CS Union Lanaudière Sud (L2Q)	3	2	0	1	7	4	+3	6	Advance to knockout stage
3	FC Boréal (L3Q)	3	0	1	2	2	7	−5	1 (Note: Tied on head-to-head result (FC Boréal 1–1 CS Titans). Overall goal difference was used as the tiebreaker.)	
4	CS Titans (L3Q)	3	0	1	2	1	7	−6	1	

Source: Spordle
Notes:

Group F

Pos	Team	Pld	W	D	L	GF	GA	GD	Pts	Qualification
1	CS Longueuil (L1Q)	3	3	0	0	13	1	+12	9	Advance to knockout stage
2	CS Trois-Rivières (L3Q)	3	1	0	2	2	5	−3	3 (Note: Head-to-head result: CS Trois-Rivières 2–0 CS Roussillon.)	Advance to knockout stage
3	CS Roussillon (L2Q)	3	1	0	2	3	11	−8	3	
4	Chevaliers NDMC (L3Q)	3	1	0	2	4	5	−1	2 (Note: Chevaliers NDMC were deducted one point for a forfeit.)	

Source: Spordle
Notes:

Group G

Pos	Team	Pld	W	D	L	GF	GA	GD	Pts	Qualification
1	CS Saint-Laurent (L1Q)	3	3	0	0	9	2	+7	9	Advance to knockout stage
2	Lakeshore SC (L2Q)	3	2	0	1	7	3	+4	6	Advance to knockout stage
3	Dollard SC (L3Q)	3	1	0	2	2	6	−4	3	
4	FS Salaberry (L3Q)	3	0	0	3	0	7	−7	−1 (Note: FS Salaberry were deducted one point for a forfeit.)	

Source: Spordle
Notes:

Group H

Pos	Team	Pld	W	D	L	GF	GA	GD	Pts	Qualification
1	FC Laval (L1Q)	3	2	0	1	16	2	+14	6 (Note: Tied on head-to-head points. Head-to-head goal difference: FC Laval +4, AS St-Léonard –1, Panellinios St Michel FC –3.)	Advance to knockout stage
2	AS St-Léonard (L3Q)	3	2	0	1	9	9	0	6	Advance to knockout stage
3	Panellinios St Michel FC (L2Q)	3	2	0	1	6	6	0	6	Advance to knockout stage
4	FC Loro (LDIR)	3	0	0	3	3	17	−14	−1 (Note: FC Loro were deducted one point for a forfeit.)	

Source: Spordle
Notes:

Group I

Pos	Team	Pld	W	D	L	GF	GA	GD	Pts	Qualification
1	CS Lévis-Est (L3Q)	3	3	0	0	9	3	+6	9	Advance to knockout stage
2	AS Chaudière-Ouest (L2Q)	3	2	0	1	10	3	+7	6	Advance to knockout stage
3	CS Fury de Rimouski (L3Q)	3	1	0	2	6	5	+1	3	Advance to knockout stage
4	CS Mondial de Rivière-du-Loup (L3Q)	3	0	0	3	3	17	−14	0	

Source: Spordle

Group J

Pos	Team	Pld	W	D	L	GF	GA	GD	Pts	Qualification
1	CS Mistral de Sherbrooke (L2Q)	3	2	1	0	10	2	+8	7	Advance to knockout stage
2	Celtix du Haut-Richelieu (L1Q)	3	1	1	1	9	4	+5	4	Advance to knockout stage
3	AS Montis (L3Q)	3	1	0	2	3	15	−12	3 (Note: Head-to-head result: AS Montis 2–0 CS les Cosmos de Granby.)	
4	CS les Cosmos de Granby (L3Q)	3	1	0	2	5	6	−1	3	

Source: Spordle
Notes:

Group K

Pos	Team	Pld	W	D	L	GF	GA	GD	Pts	Qualification
1	CS LaSalle (L1Q)	3	3	0	0	14	2	+12	9	Advance to knockout stage
2	Revolution FC (L2Q)	3	2	0	1	6	3	+3	6	Advance to knockout stage
3	CS Les Ambassadeurs de Saint-Jérôme (L3Q)	3	1	0	2	6	10	−4	3	
4	CS Blizz'Or (L3Q)	3	0	0	3	2	13	−11	0	

Source: Spordle

Group L

Pos	Team	Pld	W	D	L	GF	GA	GD	Pts	Qualification
1	CS Mont-Royal Outremont (L1Q)	3	2	0	1	5	2	+3	6 (Note: Head-to-head result: CS Mont-Royal Outremont 2–0 CS Saint-Lazare/Hudson.)	Advance to knockout stage
2	CS Saint-Lazare/Hudson (L2Q)	3	2	0	1	10	5	+5	6	Advance to knockout stage
3	Soccer Pointe-Claire (L3Q)	3	1	0	2	5	5	0	3 (Note: Head-to-head result: Soccer Pointe-Claire 3–0 Inter Montréal FC.)	
4	Inter Montréal FC (LDIR)	3	1	0	2	3	11	−8	3	

Source: Spordle
Notes:

Group M

Pos	Team	Pld	W	D	L	GF	GA	GD	Pts	Qualification
1	Ottawa South United (L1Q)	3	2	1	0	7	4	+3	7	Advance to knockout stage
2	AS Gatineau (L1Q)	3	2	0	1	8	4	+4	6	Advance to knockout stage
3	West Ottawa SC (L3Q)	3	1	1	1	4	4	0	4	Advance to knockout stage
4	FC Gatineau Likam Sporting (LDIR)	3	0	0	3	0	7	−7	0	

Source: Spordle

Ranking of third-place teams

Pos	Grp	Team	Pld	W	D	L	GF	GA	GD	Pts	Qualification
1	H	Panellinios St Michel FC (L2Q)	3	2	0	1	6	6	0	6	Advance to knockout stage
2	C	CF L'International de Québec (L2Q)	3	1	1	1	6	6	0	4	Advance to knockout stage
3	M	West Ottawa SC (L3Q)	3	1	1	1	4	4	0	4	Advance to knockout stage
4	B	AS Saint Lambert (L3Q)	3	1	1	1	4	5	−1	4	Advance to knockout stage
5	I	CS Fury de Rimouski (L3Q)	3	1	0	2	6	5	+1	3	Advance to knockout stage
6	D	CS Boréal d'Alma (L3Q)	3	1	0	2	6	6	0	3	Advance to knockout stage
7	L	Soccer Pointe-Claire (L3Q)	3	1	0	2	5	5	0	3	
8	K	CS Les Ambassadeurs de Saint-Jérôme (L3Q)	3	1	0	2	6	10	−4	3	
9	A	Notre-Dame-de-Grâce SA (L3Q)	3	1	0	2	3	7	−4	3	
10	G	Dollard SC (L3Q)	3	1	0	2	2	6	−4	3	
11	F	CS Roussillon (L2Q)	3	1	0	2	3	11	−8	3	
12	J	AS Montis (L3Q)	3	1	0	2	3	15	−12	3	
13	E	FC Boréal (L3Q)	3	0	1	2	2	7	−5	1	

Source: Spordle

=== Knockout Stage ===
- Round of 32
- July 29 – August 11

- Round of 16
- August 13–26

- Quarterfinals
- September 2–10

- Semifinals
- September 15–22

- Final
- September 26

L1Q
AS Laval
1

L2Q
Lakeshore SC
0

L1Q
AS Laval
3

L3Q
AS St-Léonard
0

L3Q
AS Brossard
0

L3Q
AS St-Léonard
1

L1Q
AS Laval
2

L1Q
Royal-Sélect de Beauport
1

L1Q
Royal-Sélect de Beauport
5

L3Q
CS Fury de Rimouski
0

L1Q
Royal-Sélect de Beauport
3

L2Q
AS Chaudière-Ouest
2

L2Q
AS Chaudière-Ouest (p)
2 (4)

L1Q
Celtix du Haut-Richelieu
2 (3)

L1Q
AS Laval
2

L2Q
Revolution FC
3

L2Q
CS Trident
0

L2Q
Revolution FC (a.e.t.)
1

L2Q
Revolution FC
1

L1Q
AS Blainville
0

L1Q
AS Blainville
2

L3Q
West Ottawa SC
0

L2Q
Revolution FC
3

L2Q
CS Saint-Lazare/Hudson
1

L1Q
CS Longueuil
2

L2Q
Panellinios St Michel FC (a.e.t.)
3

L2Q
Panellinios St Michel FC
0

L2Q
CS Saint-Lazare/Hudson
2

L1Q
AS Gatineau
1

L2Q
CS Saint-Lazare/Hudson
5

L2Q
Revolution FC
1

L1Q
FC Laval
0

L1Q
CS Saint-Laurent
6

LDIR
CS Mercier-Hochelaga-Maisonneuve
0

L1Q
CS Saint-Laurent
1

L1Q
FC Laval
2

L1Q
FC Laval
3

L1Q
CS St-Hubert
2

L1Q
FC Laval
2

L3Q
CS Optimum de Victoriaville
1

L3Q
CS Lévis-Est
3

L3Q
CS Boréal d'Alma
0

L3Q
CS Lévis-Est
1

L3Q
CS Optimum de Victoriaville
3

L3Q
CS Optimum de Victoriaville
2

L3Q
CS Venturi de Saguenay
0

L1Q
FC Laval (p) (Note: The match on September 15 was abandoned at half-time of extra time due to insufficient light, with a score of FC Laval 2–1 CS LaSalle. The entirety of extra time was replayed behind closed doors on September 22.)
1 (4)

L1Q
CS LaSalle
1 (3)

L2Q
CS Mistral de Sherbrooke
1

L2Q
CS Union Lanaudière Sud
0

L2Q
CS Mistral de Sherbrooke
0

L1Q
CS LaSalle
1

L1Q
CS LaSalle
2

L2Q
CF L'International de Québec
0

L1Q
CS LaSalle
4

L1Q
Ottawa South United
0

L1Q
CS Mont-Royal Outremont
2

L3Q
CS Trois-Rivières
1

L1Q
CS Mont-Royal Outremont
2

L1Q
Ottawa South United (a.e.t.)
3

L1Q
Ottawa South United
4

L3Q
AS Saint Lambert
0

== Ligue Espoirs (U19) ==
LS Pro again ran a reserve division. There were two divisions. Division 1 featured U19 sides from all Ligue1 clubs, while Division 2 featured U19 clubs from Ligue2.

=== Division 1 ===
Pos	Team	Pld	W	D	L	GF	GA	GD	Pts
1	CS Saint-Laurent U19	22	15	1	6	77	48	+29	46
2	Royal-Sélect de Beauport U19	22	14	3	5	57	31	+26	45
3	AS Laval U19	22	13	6	3	55	30	+25	45
4	Ottawa South United U19 (Note: The game between Ottawa South United and Celtix du Haut-Richelieu, originally ended 5–2 in favour of Ottawa, but was overturned and awarded as a victory for Celtix, due to Ottawa having a coach on the bench who was to be serving a suspension.)	22	10	4	8	54	41	+13	33 (Note: 1 point deducted due to forfeit of game vs Celtix du Haut-Richelieu)
5	FC Laval U19	22	9	6	7	47	43	+4	33
6	Celtix du Haut-Richelieu U19	22	9	4	9	48	53	−5	31
7	CS Longueuil U19	22	9	2	11	63	61	+2	29
8	CS LaSalle U19	22	8	4	10	41	48	−7	28
9	AS Gatineau U19	22	8	3	11	34	39	−5	27
10	AS Blainville U19	22	5	5	12	40	53	−13	20
11	CS St-Hubert U19	22	4	7	11	33	51	−18	18 (Note: 1 point deducted due to forfeit of game vs Royal-Sélect de Beauport. The match was won by Beauport 8–0.)
12	CS Mont-Royal Outremont U19	22	5	1	16	31	82	−51	15 (Note: 1 point deducted due to forfeit of game vs Royal-Sélect de Beauport. The match was not played.)

Source: Spordle

=== Division 2 ===
Pos	Team	Pld	W	D	L	GF	GA	GD	Pts
1	Lakeshore SC U19	16	15	1	0	48	9	+39	46
2	CS Trident U19	16	10	2	4	30	21	+9	32
3	Revolution FC U19 (Note: The game between Panellinios St Michel FC and Revolution FC was overturned into a 3–0 forfeit win in favour of Revolution FC due to the fielding of an ineligible player by Panellinios)	16	8	2	6	40	27	+13	26
4	CS Montréal Centre U19	16	6	6	4	29	28	+1	24
5	CS Saint-Lazare/Hudson U19	16	5	8	3	25	15	+10	23
6	Panellinios St Michel FC U19	16	8	0	8	24	22	+2	23 (Note: 1 point deducted due to forfeit of game vs Revolution FC)
7	AS Chaudière-Ouest U19	16	6	3	7	25	35	−10	21
8	CF L'International de Québec U19	16	4	4	8	32	34	−2	16
9	CS Union Lanaudière Sud U19	16	4	4	8	27	37	−10	16
10	CS Roussilion U19	16	4	3	9	23	38	−15	15
11	CS Mistral de Sherbrooke U19	16	3	4	9	18	35	−17	13
12	CS Rivière-des-Prairies U19	16	3	3	10	27	47	−20	12

Source: Spordle

=== Awards ===
Award	D1	D2	Ref
Ballon d'or (Best Player)	Lucas Ibanez Rojas (CS St-Laurent)	William Woodruff (Lakeshore SC)	
Soulier D'Or (Golden Boot – Top Scorer)	Lucas Ibanez Rojas (CS St-Laurent)	Enzo Dorigueto (Lakeshore SC)	
Gant D'Or (Golden Glove – Top Goalkeeper)	Austin Wood (Ottawa South United)	Daniel Kashala (Lakeshore SC)	
