= 2020 Première ligue de soccer du Québec féminine season =

Première ligue de soccer du Québec Women's Division
- Season: 2020
- Champions: AS Blainville
- Matches: 6+2
- Top goalscorer: Valerie Sanderson (5) (AS Blainville)

The 2020 Première ligue de soccer du Québec féminine season was the third season of play for the Première ligue de soccer du Québec, a Division 3 women's soccer league in the Canadian soccer pyramid and the highest level of soccer based in the Canadian province of Québec.

CS Monteuil was the defending champion for the female division, although they did not participate due to the pandemic. AS Blainville won their first women's division title.

== Changes from 2019 and Changes due to pandemic ==
On the women's side, eight teams were set to compete, up from six the previous year. Dynamo de Québec and FC Sélect Rive-Sud withdrew from the league following the 2018 season, while four new clubs - CS Longueuil, CS St-Hubert, AS Pierrefonds and Ottawa South United - joined the league. League1 Ontario and the PLSQ had planned to hold a Final Four end-of-season tournament for the women's divisions, from August 14 to 16, pitting the top two sides from each league in an inter-provincial playoff. However, like the male division, the female division was impacted by the pandemic. Initially, the women's season was set to be cancelled as only two of the eight clubs had announced their participation, however, two other clubs ultimately joined bringing the total to four participating clubs with four clubs opting out of the restart (CS Mont-Royal Outremont, AS Pierrefonds, CS St-Hubert, and the defending champions CS Monteuil). A shortened season ran from 25 July until 8 August, with a 3-game season, which was followed by a champions playoff weekend on 15 August where the first and second place teams played a championship match, while a consolation match was held between the third and fourth place teams.

== Teams ==
Eight teams were set to initially participate, however, four teams withdrew due to the COVID-19 pandemic. The remaining four teams played a short season from late July until mid-August, with each team playing each other once, for a total of 3 games. Following this, there were matches for 1st and 3rd place. After the season, the league planned to organize some exhibition matches between the participating and non-participating teams. Matches in the women's division were played at centralized locations rather than at the home fields of the teams.

Team	City	2020 Status
A.S. Blainville	Blainville, Laurentides	Participating
CS Fabrose	Laval, Laval	Participating
CS Longueuil	Longueuil, Montérégie	Participating
CS Monteuil	Laval, Laval	Withdrew
CS Mont-Royal Outremont	Mount Royal, Montréal	Withdrew
Ottawa South United	Ottawa, Ontario	Participating
AS Pierrefonds	Lac St-Louis, Montreal	Withdrew
CS St-Hubert	Saint-Hubert, Montérégie	Withdrew

== Standings ==
Pos	Team	Pld	W	D	L	GF	GA	GD	Pts	
1	A.S. Blainville (C)	3	3	0	0	11	0	+11	9	Championship Match
2	CS Fabrose	3	2	0	1	5	8	−3	6	Championship Match
3	CS Longueuil (T)	3	1	0	2	5	5	0	3	3rd-place match
4	Ottawa South United	3	0	0	3	1	9	−8	0	3rd-place match

Source: PLSQ
(C) Champion; (T) Third-place match winner

=== Classification matches ===
Championship Match

15 August 2020	A.S. Blainville	0–0 (4–2 p)	CS Fabrose	Laval, Quebec
2:00 p.m.				Stadium: Desjardins Stadium; Referee: Marie-Han Gagnon-Chretien

Third-place match

15 August 2020	CS Longueuil	4–0	Ottawa South United	Laval, Quebec
11:30 a.m.	T.Ibarz 18'; K.Lemire 56'; C.Sedki 75'; C.Achille 81'	Report		Stadium: Desjardins Stadium; Referee: Sheila Couture

== Top scorers ==
Includes goals in classification matches

Rank	Player	Club	Goals
1	Valerie Sanderson	AS Blainville	5
2	Sarah Humes	AS Blainville	3
3	Marie-Eve Bernard O'Breham	CS Fabrose	2
3	Vanessa Gregoire	AS Blainville	2
3	Charlene Achille	CS Longueuil	2
3	Karima Lemire	CS Longueuil	2
