= Mario Gerges =

Canadian soccer player (born 1995)

Personal information
- Date of birth: November 20, 1995 (age 30)
- Place of birth: Montreal, Quebec, Canada
- Height: 1.90 m (6 ft 3 in)
- Position: Goalkeeper

Youth career
- CS St-Hubert
- AS Saint-Lambert
- Coquitlam Metro-Ford SC

College career
Years	Team	Apps	(Gls)
2014	Montreal Carabins		
2016	Laval Rouge et Or		

Senior career*
Years	Team	Apps	(Gls)
2015	CS Longueuil	14	(0)
2017	Dynamo de Québec	18	(0)
2018	TSS FC Rovers	5	(0)
2018	CS St-Hubert	1	(0)
2020	CS Longueuil	6	(0)
2020–2022	Al Ittifaq		
2025–2026	AS Gatineau	10	(0)
2026	FC Supra du Québec	2	(0)
- * Club domestic league appearances and goals as of June 11, 2026

Mario Gerges (born November 20, 1995) is a Canadian soccer player.

== Early life ==
Gerges began playing youth soccer with CS St-Hubert, before later joining AS Saint-Lambert. When he was 16, he traveled to the United States to try-out with the Portland Timbers Academy, where he initially earned a spot, however, as his family did not live there, they arranged for him to join the Vancouver Whitecaps FC Academy. However, the Whitecaps Academy did not have a roster spot for him, but allowed him to remain and train with the program. He joined Coquitlam Metro-Ford SC and was named to Team British Columbia for the 2013 Canada Summer Games, where he was named to the tournament All-Star team.

== University career ==
In 2014, Gerges began attending the Université de Montréal, where he played for the men's soccer team.

In 2016, he began attending the Université Laval, joining the men's soccer team.

== Club career ==
In 2015, Gerges began playing with CS Longueuil in the Première ligue de soccer du Québec. Later in 2015 and in early 2016, he trained with USL club FC Montreal, the second team of the Montreal Impact, but ultimately did not sign with the club. In 2017, he played with Dynamo de Québec. In 2018, he joined the TSS FC Rovers in the Premier Development League. After the end of the season, he returned to the PLSQ with CS St-Hubert.

In late 2018, he went to Spain, as he was told there was a Spanish fourth tier side interested in signing him, but it turned out to not be the case, and he returned to Quebec a month later. In early 2019, he went to Egypt to trial with Egyptian Premier League side Al Ittihad Alexandria Club, signing a contract, however, shortly before the start of the next season, the coaching staff was replaced and they chose to not honour his contract.

In 2020, he played with CS Longueuil in the PLSQ. In November 2020, he signed with Al Ittifaq in the Bahraini Second Division.

In 2025, he joined AS Gatineau in Ligue2 Québec, where he helped the side win promotion and earned the league's Golden Glove award.

In April 2026, he signed a short-term contract with Canadian Premier League club FC Supra du Québec. He made his debut on June 6, in a draw against Pacific FC.

== International career ==
In October 2013, Gerges was called up to a training camp with the Canada U18.

== Career statistics ==
As of October 27, 2026

Appearances and goals by club, season and competition
Club	Season	League			National cup		League cup		Other		Total	
Club	Season	Division	Apps	Goals	Apps	Goals	Apps	Goals	Apps	Goals		
CS Longueuil	2015	Première ligue de soccer du Québec	14	0	—		2	0	—		16	0
Dynamo de Québec	2017	Première ligue de soccer du Québec	18	0	—		1	0	—		19	0
TSS FC Rovers	2018	Premier Development League	5	0	—		—		—		5	0
CS St-Hubert	2018	Première ligue de soccer du Québec	1	0	—		2	0	—		3	0
CS Longueuil	2020	Première ligue de soccer du Québec	6	0	—		—		—		6	0
AS Gatineau	2025	Ligue2 Québec	9	0	—		—		?	?	9	0
AS Gatineau	2026	Ligue1 Québec	1	0	—		—		—		1	0
AS Gatineau	Total		10	0	0	0	0	0	0	0	0	0
FC Supra du Québec	2026	Canada Premier League	2	0	0	0	—		0	0	2	0
Career total			56	0	0	0	5	0	0	0	61	0
