= Mathilde Lachance =

Canadian soccer player

Personal information
- Date of birth: July 2, 2002 (age 24)
- Place of birth: L'Ancienne-Lorette, Québec, Canada
- Height: 5 ft 4 in (1.63 m)
- Position: Defender

Youth career
- AS Mistral Laurentien
- 2018: Royal-Sélect de Beauport

College career
Years	Team	Apps	(Gls)
2024	Laval Rouge et Or	11	(0)

Senior career*
Years	Team	Apps	(Gls)
2019	Dynamo de Québec	14	(1)
2024	Royal-Sélect de Beauport	16	(0)
2025	Montreal Roses FC	10	(0)
- * Club domestic league appearances and goals as of October 20, 2025

Mathilde Lachance (born July 2, 2002) is a Canadian soccer player.

== Early life ==
Lachance played youth soccer with AS Mistral Laurentien before joining Royal-Sélect de Beauport at U16 level.

== College career ==
After high school, Lachance attended Cégep Garneau and played for their soccer team. During her final year, she suffered a series of repeated heart attacks, that forced her to undergo surgery and pause her soccer career for a year and a half.

In 2024, she began attending Université Laval, where she played for the women's soccer team. At the 2024 U Sports women's soccer championship, she was named to the All-Tournament Team.

== Club career ==
In 2019, Lachance played with Dynamo de Québec in the Première ligue de soccer du Québec. In 2024, she played with Royal-Sélect de Beauport.

In February 2025, she signed with Montreal Roses FC in the Northern Super League. After one season, she departed the club.

== Career statistics ==
As of October 20, 2025

Club	Season	League			Playoffs		National Cup		Other		Total	
Club	Season	League	Apps	Goals	Apps	Goals	Apps	Goals	Apps	Goals	Apps	Goals
Dynamo de Québec	2019	Première ligue de soccer du Québec	14	1	—		—		—		14	1
Royal-Sélect de Beauport	2024	Ligue1 Québec	16	0	1	0	—		—		17	0
Montreal Roses FC	2025	Northern Super League	10	0	0	0	—		—		10	0
Career total			40	1	1	0	0	0	0	0	41	1
