= 2025 Ligue1 Québec season =

Football league season in Quebec, Canada

Ligue1 Québec Men's Division
- Season: 2025
- Dates: April 11 - September 13

The 2025 Ligue1 Québec season is the fourteenth season of play for the Ligue1 Québec (and the third since rebranding from the Première ligue de soccer du Québec). It is the first season with multiple tiered divisions, with Ligue2 Québec and Ligue3 Québec being introduced this season. L1Q is a division three semi-professional soccer league in the Canadian soccer league system and the highest level of soccer based in the Canadian province of Québec.

FC Laval will compete in the 2025 Canadian Championship as the league's representative as 2024 league champions.

== Changes from 2024 ==
CF Montréal U23 withdrew from the league after the 2024 season. Two new tiered divisions were formed following the dissolution of the amateur Ligue de soccer élite du Québec.

== Format ==
In Ligue1 Québec, the ten teams will play each other twice, home and away. There will be no relegation at the end of the season. The winner will qualify for the 2026 Canadian Championship.

In Ligue2 Québec, the 24 teams will play each other each once. At the end of the season, the top team will be promoted to Ligue1 Québec for the 2026 season, while the teams finishing second through fifth will participate in a promotion playoff for the second promotion spot. The clubs finishing 15th through 24th will be relegated to Ligue3 Québec.

In Ligue3 Québec, 16 teams (including 4 reserve sides) will each play each other once. The top four teams will compete for the league title in a playoff, however, there will be no promotion for this season.

== Ligue1 Québec ==
Ligue1 Québec
- Season: 2025
- Dates: April 25 – August 24
- Champions: CS Saint-Laurent (2nd title)
- Coupe L1QC: AS Blainville (4th title)
- Relegated: None
- Matches: 90
- Goals: 309 (3.43 per match)
- Top goalscorer: Mouhamadou Kane (12 goals)

=== Teams ===
Ten teams will participate in the 2024 season, with each team playing each other twice for a total of 18 matches. The league champion will earn a place in the 2026 Canadian Championship.

Team	City	Stadium	Head coach
A.S. Blainville	Blainville, Laurentides	Parc Blainville	
Celtix du Haut-Richelieu	Saint-Jean-sur-Richelieu, Montérégie	Parc Pierre-Benoît	
AS Laval	Laval, Laval	Parc de Lausanne	
FC Laval	Laval, Laval	Parc Berthiaume-Du Tremblay Stade	
CS Longueuil	Longueuil, Montérégie	Parc Laurier	
CS Mont-Royal Outremont	Mount Royal, Montréal	Parc Recreatif de TMR	
CS Saint-Laurent	Saint-Laurent, Montreal	Vanier College Stadium	
CS St-Hubert	Saint-Hubert, Montérégie	Centre Sportif Roseanne-Laflamme	
Ottawa South United	Ottawa, Ontario	George Nelms Sports Park	
Royal-Sélect de Beauport	Quebec City, Capitale-Nationale	Stade Beauport	

=== Standings ===
Pos	Team	Pld	W	D	L	GF	GA	GD	Pts	Qualification
1	CS Saint-Laurent (C)	18	13	4	1	43	18	+25	43	2026 Canadian Championship and Coupe L1QC
2	AS Laval (Note: The game on May 31 between AS Laval and CS Longueuil initially ended 2–0 in favour of AS Laval but was later deemed a 3–0 forfeit win in favour of AS Laval.)	18	11	1	6	39	24	+15	34	Coupe L1QC
3	Royal-Sélect de Beauport	18	9	2	7	37	35	+2	29	Coupe L1QC
4	FC Laval	18	8	4	6	35	34	+1	28	Coupe L1QC
5	CS Mont-Royal Outremont	18	8	0	10	30	37	−7	24	Coupe L1QC
6	AS Blainville	18	6	5	7	27	21	+6	23	Coupe L1QC
7	Celtix du Haut-Richelieu	18	6	3	9	30	38	−8	21	Coupe L1QC
8	CS St-Hubert	18	5	4	9	19	30	−11	19	Coupe L1QC
9	Ottawa South United	18	4	5	9	30	34	−4	17	
10	CS Longueuil	18	4	4	10	19	38	−19	15 (Note: Deducted 1 point due to forfeit of game on May 31 vs AS Laval.)	

Source: Spordle
(C) Champions

==== Statistics ====
Top goalscorers
(does not include Coupe Ligue1 Québec)

Rank	Player	Club	Goals
1	Mouhamadou Kane	AS Laval	12
2	Étienne Tremblay	Celtix du Haut-Richelieu	10
3	David Martins Jorge	CS Longueuil	9
3	Abdulazeez Hammood Lazam	Ottawa South United	9
5	Olivier Andres Correa	CS St-Laurent	8
5	Mohamed Kourouma	AS Laval	8
7	Ibrahim Condé	FC Laval	7
7	Samir-Mohamed Djeha	CS St-Laurent	7
7	Abdul Binate	AS Blainville	7
7	Bakary Stephane Leonard Kaboré	CS St-Laurent	7

Source: Spordle

==== Awards ====
Award	Player (club)	Ref
Ballon d'or (Best Player)	Abdul Binate (AS Blainville)	
Soulier D'Or (Golden Boot - Top Scorer)	Mouhamadou Kane (AS Laval)	
Gant D'Or (Golden Glove - Top Goalkeeper)	Joakim Milli (CS St-Laurent)	
Coach of the Year	Nicholas Razzaghi (CS St-Laurent)	

=== Coupe L1QC ===
The league cup occurred after the season, with the top-eight clubs from the season advancing to the cup.

Quarterfinals; August 31
1	CS Saint-Laurent	2
8	CS St-Hubert	0
4	FC Laval	4 (a.e.t.)
5	CS Mont-Royal Outremont	2
2	AS Laval	1 (a.e.t.)
7	Celtix du Haut-Richelieu	0
3	Royal-Sélect de Beauport	2 (2)
6	AS Blainville	2 (4)

Semifinals; September 13
1	CS Saint-Laurent	3
4	FC Laval	1
2	AS Laval	2(1)
6	AS Blainville	2(3)

Final; September 27
1	CS Saint-Laurent	1
6	AS Blainville	2

Source: Spordle

=== Friendlies ===
May 24, 2025 Maple Cup	(United States) Vermont Green FC	4–2	FC Laval	Burlington, Vermont, United States
	Costabile 34'; Picotto 46'; Njike 54'; Tattevin 90'	Report	Condé 21'; Frimpong 79'	Stadium: Virtue Field; Attendance: 2500; Referee: Jason Weischedel

June 12, 2025	(Morocco) Wydad AC	7–0	CS St-Laurent	Washington, D.C., United States
	Obeng; Aziz Ki; Mwalimu; Rahyi; Zemraoui	Report

== Ligue2 Québec ==
Ligue2 Québec
- Season: 2025
- Dates: April 11 – September 20
- Champions: CS LaSalle
- Promoted: CS LaSalle; AS Gatineau
- Relegated: CS Phénix des Rivières; CS Lévis-Est; CS Les Ambassadeurs de Saint-Jérôme; CS Trois-Rivières; AS St-Léonard; AS Montis; CS Braves d'Ahuntsic; FC Boréal; CS Boucherville; AS Brossard
- Matches: 276
- Goals: 1,053 (3.82 per match)
- Top goalscorer: Bastien Aussems (24)

=== Teams ===
Twenty-four teams will participate in the division. Each team will play each other once for a 23-match season. At the end of the season, the first-place team will be promoted to Ligue1 Québec for the 2026 season. The teams finishing second through fifth will participate in the promotion playoffs to earn the second promotion berth. The teams finishing 15th through 24th will be relegated to Ligue3 Québec.

Team	City	Stadium
Current teams
AS Brossard	Brossard, Montérégie	
AS Gatineau	Gatineau, Outaouais	
AS St-Léonard	St Leonard, Montreal	
FC Boréal	Prévost	
CS Braves d'Ahuntsic	Montréal	
CF L'International de Québec	Quebec City	
AS Chaudière-Ouest	Lévis	
CS Boucherville	Boucherville	
CS LaSalle	Montréal	
CS Montréal Centre	Montréal	
CS Roussilion	Saint-Constant	
CS Saint-Lazare/Hudson	Saint-Lazare	
CS Trident	Quebec City	
CS Trois-Rivières	Trois-Rivières	
CS Rivière-des-Prairies	Rivière-des-Prairies–Pointe-aux-Trembles	
Lakeshore SC	Kirkland, Montréal	
CS Lévis-Est	Lévis	
CS Mistral de Sherbrooke	Sherbrooke	
AS Montis	Saint-Bruno-de-Montarville	
Panellinios St Michel FC	Montréal	
CS Phénix des Rivières	Quebec City	
Revolution FC	Saint-Eustache	
CS Les Ambassadeurs de Saint-Jérôme	Saint-Jérôme	
CS Union Lanaudière Sud	Repentigny	

=== Standings ===
Pos	Team	Pld	W	D	L	GF	GA	GD	Pts	Qualification
1	CS LaSalle (C, P)	23	18	5	0	70	21	+49	59	Promoted to 2026 Ligue1 Québec
2	AS Gatineau (P)	23	16	5	2	55	15	+40	53	Advance to Promotion Playoffs
3	Lakeshore SC	23	16	4	3	64	26	+38	52	Advance to Promotion Playoffs
4	CS Montréal Centre (Note: The game between Revolution FC and CS Montréal Centre initially ended in a 1–1 but was later turned into a 3–0 forfeit win in favour of Revolution)	23	15	5	3	64	21	+43	49 (Note: 1 point deducted due to forfeit of game vs Revolution FC)	Advance to Promotion Playoffs
5	Revolution FC	23	14	4	5	51	25	+26	46	Advance to Promotion Playoffs
6	CS Rivière-des-Prairies	23	13	4	6	60	32	+28	43	
7	AS Chaudière-Ouest	23	13	4	6	42	31	+11	43	
8	CS Saint-Lazare/Hudson	23	12	4	7	46	35	+11	40	
9	CS Union Lanaudière Sud	23	12	2	9	42	27	+15	38	
10	CS Trident (Note: The game between CS Roussillon and CS Trident initially ended in a 0–1 but was later turned into a 3–0 forfeit win in favour of Trident)	23	11	5	7	56	28	+28	38	
11	CS Mistral de Sherbrooke	23	11	3	9	68	44	+24	36	
12	CF L'International de Québec	23	11	2	10	47	35	+12	35	
13	Panellinios St Michel FC	23	11	2	10	44	49	−5	35	
14	CS Roussilion	23	11	3	9	48	39	+9	35 (Note: 1 point deducted due to forfeit of game vs CS Trident)	
15	CS Phénix des Rivières (R)	23	8	6	9	45	44	+1	30	Relegated to 2026 Ligue3 Québec
16	CS Trois-Rivières (R)	23	8	1	14	46	73	−27	24 (Note: 1 point deducted due to game ending early due to insufficient players vs CF L'International de Québec)	Relegated to 2026 Ligue3 Québec
17	CS Lévis-Est (R)	23	6	5	12	41	59	−18	23	Relegated to 2026 Ligue3 Québec
18	CS Les Ambassadeurs de Saint-Jérôme (R)	23	6	5	12	34	46	−12	22 (Note: 1 point deducted due to forfeit of game vs CS Phénix des Rivières)	Relegated to 2026 Ligue3 Québec
19	AS St-Léonard (R)	23	6	3	14	30	56	−26	21	Relegated to 2026 Ligue3 Québec
20	AS Montis (R)	23	4	3	16	28	58	−30	15	Relegated to 2026 Ligue3 Québec
21	CS Braves d'Ahuntsic (R)	23	4	3	16	21	61	−40	15	Left league after season
22	FC Boréal (R)	23	2	6	15	14	56	−42	12	Relegated to 2026 Ligue3 Québec
23	CS Boucherville (R)	23	3	4	16	26	67	−41	11 (Note: 2 points deducted due to forfeit of games vs CS Phénix des Rivières and CS Union Lanaudière Sud)	Relegated to 2026 Ligue3 Québec
24	AS Brossard (R)	23	1	0	22	11	105	−94	2 (Note: 1 point deducted due to forfeit of game vs CS Rivière-des-Prairies)	Relegated to 2026 Ligue3 Québec

Source: Spordle
(C) Champions; (P) Promoted; (R) Relegated

==== Promotion playoffs ====
The second through fifth place teams advanced to the promotion playoffs.

Semifinals; September 20
2	AS Gatineau	3
5	Revolution FC	1
3	Lakeshore SC (a.e.t.)	3
4	CS Montréal Centre	1

Championship Game; September 27
2	AS Gatineau	1(5)
3	Lakeshore SC	1(4)

Source: Spordle

==== Statistics ====
Top goalscorers
(does not include Promotion Playoffs)

Rank	Player	Club	Goals
1	Bastien Aussems	CS Trident	24
2	Loïc Kwemi	CS LaSalle	23
3	Pedro Gulli	Lakeshore SC	21
4	Marc-Olivier Kouo Dibongue	CF L'International de Québec	17
5	Jeremy Morin	AS Chaudière-Ouest	15
6	Prince-Ivan Nginyu	CS LaSalle	14
7	Martial Ange Mietchop	CS Trois-Rivières	13
8	David Martins Jorge	CS Rivière-des-Prairies	12
8	Chimnosoh Okeke	CS Rivière-des-Prairies	12
8	Mahdi Abbassi	CS Montréal Centre	12
8	Paymon Kabiri	Lakeshore SC	12
8	Samuel Valade	CS Mistral de Sherbrooke	12
8	Amine Khettal	Revolution FC	12

Source: Spordle

==== Awards ====
Award	Player (club)	Ref
Ballon d'or (Best Player)	Loïc Kwemi (CS LaSalle)	
Soulier D'Or (Golden Boot - Top Scorer)	Bastien Aussems (CS Trident)	
Gant D'Or (Golden Glove - Top Goalkeeper)	Mario Gerges (AS Gatineau)	

== Ligue3 Québec ==
Ligue3 Québec
- Season: 2025
- Dates: May 7 – September 6 (regular season); September 13 – 27 (play-offs)
- Champions: CS Longueuil B
- Matches: 120
- Goals: 470 (3.92 per match)
- Top goalscorer: Kékoro Konaté (20)

=== Teams ===
Sixteen teams will participate in the division. Each team will place each other once for a 15 match season. At the end of the season, the top four teams will compete in the playoffs for the league title. There will be no promotion this season. At the end of the season, the four Reserve teams will be removed from the league.

Team	City	Stadium
Current teams
AS Laval B	Laval	
CS Blizz'Or (Vallée de l'Or)	Val-d'Or	Polyvalente Le Carrefour (1)
CS Boréal d'Alma	Alma	
CS Lanaudière-Nord	Joliette, Lanaudière	
Celtix du Haut-Richelieu B	Saint-Jean-sur-Richelieu, Montérégie	
Chevaliers NDMC	Notre-Dame-du-Mont-Carmel	
CS Mondial de Rivière-du-Loup	Rivière-du-Loup	Cégep de Rivière-du-Loup (1)
CS Fury de Rimouski	Rimouski	Complexe Sportif Guillaume-Leblanc (Synthétique)
CS Haute-Saint-Charles	Quebec City	
CS Mont-Royal Outremont B	Mount Royal, Montréal	
CS Titans	Bois-des-Filion	Parc André-Guérard (Synthétique)
FC Anjou	Anjou	
FS Salaberry	Montréal	
CS Longueuil B	Longueuil, Montérégie	
Notre-Dame-de-Grâce SA	Notre-Dame-de-Grâce	
CS Venturi de Saguenay	Saguenay	

=== Standings ===
Pos	Team	Pld	W	D	L	GF	GA	GD	Pts	Qualification
1	CS Longueuil B (C)	15	13	1	1	51	18	+33	40	Advance to Playoffs; Ineligible for next season
2	CS Fury de Rimouski	15	12	0	3	38	12	+26	36	Advance to Playoffs
3	CS Boréal d'Alma	15	10	3	2	48	16	+32	33	Advance to Playoffs
4	CS Venturi de Saguenay	15	10	3	2	43	24	+19	33	Advance to Playoffs
5	AS Laval B	15	9	1	5	40	27	+13	28	Ineligible for next season
6	CS Mondial de Rivière-du-Loup	15	8	2	5	31	28	+3	26	
7	Chevaliers NDMC	15	7	3	5	40	31	+9	24	
8	CS Titans	15	6	2	7	16	25	−9	20	
9	FS Salaberry	15	5	5	5	29	26	+3	19 (Note: 1 point deducted due to forfeit of game vs CS Launadière-Nord)	
10	CS Haute-Saint-Charles	15	5	2	8	21	28	−7	17	
11	CS Lanaudière-Nord	15	4	1	10	26	36	−10	12 (Note: 1 point deducted due to forfeit of game vs CS Fury de Rimouski)	Departed league after season
12	Celtix du Haut-Richelieu B	15	3	3	9	24	42	−18	12	Ineligible for next season
13	CS Mont-Royal Outremont B	15	4	1	10	15	38	−23	11 (Note: 2 points deducted due to forfeit of games vs CS Longueuil B and CS Launadière-Nord)	Ineligible for next season
14	CS Blizz'Or	15	3	2	10	16	37	−21	11	
15	FC Anjou	15	3	2	10	19	42	−23	7 (Note: 4 points deducted due to forfeit of games vs CS Haute-Saint-Charles, CS Fury de Rimouski, CS Venturi de Saguenay and CS Longueuil B)	Departed league after season
16	Notre-Dame-de-Grâce SA	15	2	1	12	13	40	−27	7	

Source: Spordle
(C) Champions

==== Playoffs ====
The top four finishers advanced to the playoffs.

Semifinals; September 13 – 14
1	CS Longueuil B	6
4	CS Venturi de Saguenay	4
2	CS Fury de Rimouski	1
3	CS Boréal d'Alma	0

Championship Game; September 27
1	CS Longueuil B (a.e.t.)	6
2	CS Fury de Rimouski	3

Source: Spordle

==== Statistics ====
Top goalscorers
(does not include playoffs)

Rank	Player	Club	Goals
1	Kékoro Konaté	CS Fury de Rimouski	20
2	Mathiel Dufour	CS Boréal d'Alma	13
3	Kevin Briard	CS Venturi de Saguenay	12
4	Moussa Touré	Chevaliers NDMC	11
4	Thomas Bonneau-Desmeules	CS Boréal d'Alma	11
6	Julien Noiret	CS Longueuil B	10
7	Matis Boulanger	CS Titans	9
7	Mohamed Lamine Sylla	FS Salaberry	9
9	Patrick Harrison	CS Mondial de Rivière-du-Loup	8
10	Felix Turgeon	CS Boréal d'Alma	7
10	Mahamat Outman	Notre-Dame-de-Grâce SA	7
10	Rodensley Eloi Clervil	AS Laval B	7
10	Vincent Paré	CS Mondial de Rivière-du-Loup	7

Source: Spordle

==== Awards ====
Award	Player (club)	Ref
Ballon d'or (Best Player)	Kékoro Konaté (CS Fury de Rimouski)	
Soulier D'Or (Golden Boot - Top Scorer)	Kékoro Konaté (CS Fury de Rimouski)	
Gant D'Or (Golden Glove - Top Goalkeeper)	Mouhamed Seye (CS Venturi de Saguenay)	

== Ligue Espoirs Québec ==
The league operated a U19 reserve division this season. The winner of each division and the best second place team advanced to the playoffs.

=== Group A ===
Pos	Team	Pld	W	D	L	GF	GA	GD	Pts	
1	Celtix du Haut-Richelieu U19	18	15	2	1	82	20	+62	47	Advance to Final Four playoffs
2	Ottawa South United U19 (C)	18	15	1	2	67	20	+47	46	Advance to Final Four playoffs
3	AS Laval U19	18	13	0	5	54	25	+29	39	
4	CS Montréal Centre U19	18	12	1	5	56	28	+28	37	
5	CS Rivière-des-Prairies U19	18	8	2	8	52	39	+13	26	
6	CS Trois-Rivières U19	18	6	3	9	35	51	−16	21	
7	CS St-Hubert U19	18	6	2	10	35	48	−13	20	
8	CS Saint-Lazare/Hudson U19 (Note: CS Saint-Lazare/Hudson U19 were penalized 2 points for forfeiting their matches against Ottawa South United and CS Trois-Rivières)	18	7	0	11	34	44	−10	19	
9	CS Lévis-Est U19	18	2	0	16	17	75	−58	6	
10	Revolution FC U19 (Note: Revolution FC U19 were penalized 2 points for forfeiting their matches against CS Rivière-des-Prairies and CS Lévis-Est)	18	0	1	17	8	90	−82	−1	

Source: Spordle
(C) Champions

=== Group B ===
Pos	Team	Pld	W	D	L	GF	GA	GD	Pts	
1	AS Blainville U19	18	13	3	2	50	24	+26	42	Advance to Final Four playoffs
2	FC Laval U19	18	12	5	1	59	28	+31	41	
3	CS Mont-Royal Outremont U19	18	10	4	4	44	27	+17	34	
4	Lakeshore SC U19	18	8	6	4	34	27	+7	30	
5	CF L'International de Québec U19	18	8	5	5	35	21	+14	29	
6	AS Chaudière-Ouest U19	18	7	4	7	33	24	+9	25	
7	AS Gatineau U19	18	7	2	9	38	34	+4	23	
8	AS Montis U19	18	5	0	13	26	46	−20	15	
9	CS Braves d'Ahuntsic U19	18	2	3	13	25	68	−43	9	
10	CS Boucherville U19 (Note: CS Boucherville U19 were penalized 1 point for forfeiting their matches against CF L'International de Québec)	18	1	2	15	20	65	−45	4	

Source: Spordle

=== Group C ===
Pos	Team	Pld	W	D	L	GF	GA	GD	Pts	
1	CS Saint-Laurent U19	18	13	3	2	64	22	+42	42	Advance to Final Four playoffs
2	Royal-Sélect de Beauport U19	18	13	2	3	53	18	+35	41	
3	CS Longueuil U19	18	12	3	3	54	31	+23	39	
4	CS LaSalle U19	18	9	4	5	45	33	+12	31	
5	CS Mistral de Sherbrooke U19	18	8	3	7	35	42	−7	27	
6	CS Union Lanaudière Sud U19	18	6	4	8	39	48	−9	22	
7	CS Trident U19	18	7	1	10	24	32	−8	22	
8	AS Brossard U19	18	4	1	13	16	43	−27	13	
9	FC Boréal U19	18	3	3	12	31	45	−14	12	
10	CS Roussilion U19 (Note: CS Roussilion were penalized 1 point for forfeiting their match against CS Longueuil and Royal-Sélect de Beauport)	18	2	2	14	24	71	−47	7	

Source: Spordle

==== Playoffs ====
The winner of each division and the best second place finisher advanced to the playoffs.

Semifinals; August 23
A1	Celtix du Haut-Richelieu U19	1
WC	Ottawa South United U19	3
C1	CS St-Laurent U19	3
B1	AS Blainville U19	2

Championship Game; August 30
WC	Ottawa South United U19	5
C1	CS St-Laurent U19	2

Source: Spordle

==== Awards ====
Award	Player (club)	Ref
Ballon d'or (Best Player)	Éloi Kingsley (Celtix du Haut-Richelieu U19)	
Soulier D'Or (Golden Boot - Top Scorer)	Éloi Kingsley (Celtix du Haut-Richelieu U19)	
Gant D'Or (Golden Glove - Top Goalkeeper)	Alex Desmeules (Royal-Sélect de Beauport U19)	

== Coupe du Québec ==
Soccer Quebec hosted the Coupe du Québec to determine their entrant into the amateur national championship, the 2025 Challenge Trophy. It was open to clubs in Ligue2 Quebec and below. 14 Ligue2 Quebec clubs, 6 Ligue3 Quebec clubs, and 9 Ligue Espoirs clubs entered, in addition to clubs in the lower regional divisions. CS Rivière-des-Prairies won the Cup and represented the province where they finished in third.

=== Bracket ===
- First Round
- May 27 – June 6

- Second Round
- June 10–26

- Round of 16
- July 8–16

- Quarterfinals
- July 24 – August 12

- Semifinals
- August 26 – September 3

- Final
- September 6

L2Q
CF L'International de Québec
2

L2Q
CS Roussilion
3

L2Q
CS Roussilion
3

L2Q
CS Les Ambassadeurs de Saint-Jérôme
1

L2Q
CS Roussilion
0

L2Q
CS Rivière-des-Prairies
1

L2Q
CS Rivière-des-Prairies
5

L2Q
CS Phénix des Rivières
1

L2Q
CS Rivière-des-Prairies
3

L2Q
Panellinios St Michel FC
0

L2Q
CS LaSalle
3 (w/o)

ESP
CS Longueuil U19
0

L2Q
CS LaSalle
1

L2Q
Panellinios St Michel FC
4

L2Q
Panellinios St Michel FC
8

L3Q
CS Haute-Saint-Charles
0

REG
AS Dorval
0

L3Q
CS Haute-Saint-Charles
5

L2Q
CS Rivière-des-Prairies
2

ESP
CS Mont-Royal Outremont U19
1

L2Q
CS Montréal Centre
1

L2Q
CS Mistral de Sherbrooke
0

L3Q
Celtix du Haut-Richelieu B
2

L2Q
CS Mistral de Sherbrooke
3

L2Q
CS Montréal Centre
0

ESP
CS Mont-Royal Outremont U19
2

REG
AS Pointe-aux-Trembles Ultras FC
1

ESP
CS Mont-Royal Outremont U19
4

ESP
CS Mont-Royal Outremont U19
5

LDIR
CS Optimum de Victoriaville
1

ESP
AS Laval U19
4

L2Q
AS Brossard
0

L2Q
AS Brossard
4

LDIR U21
Westmount SC
1

ESP
AS Laval U19
1

LDIR
CS Optimum de Victoriaville
2

ESP
AS Chaudière-Ouest U19
0

LDIR
CS Optimum de Victoriaville
1

L2Q
CS Rivière-des-Prairies
2

L2Q
CS Union Lanaudière Sud
0

ESP
CS St-Hubert U19
3

LDIR
AS Greenfeld Park
1

ESP
CS St-Hubert U19
2

L2Q
CS Boucherville
1

L2Q
CS Boucherville
5

ESP
FC Laval U19
4

ESP
FC Laval U19
3

L2Q
CS Braves d'Ahuntsic
1

ESP
CS St-Hubert U19
1

L2Q
CS Union Lanaudière Sud
2

REG
CS Arsenal de Montreal
2

L2Q
CS Union Lanaudière Sud
3

L2Q
CS Union Lanaudière Sud
2

L2Q
Revolution FC
1

L3Q
CS Lanaudière-Nord
1

L2Q
Revolution FC
4

L2Q
Revolution FC
3

L2Q
AS Montis
2

L2Q
CS Union Lanaudière Sud
4

ESP
CS St-Laurent U19
1

L2Q
CS Trois-Rivières
1

ESP
Royal-Sélect de Beauport U19
2

L3Q
CS Venturi de Saguenay
3

ESP
Royal-Sélect de Beauport U19
4

ESP
Royal-Sélect de Beauport U19
0

ESP
CS St-Laurent U19
1

LDIR
CS les Cosmos de Granby
0

ESP
CS St Laurent U19
9

ESP
CS St-Laurent U19
4

ESP
AS Blainville U19
3

L3Q
FC Anjou
1

ESP
AS Blainville U19
2

ESP
AS Blainville U19
5

REG
Amarok du Plateau
0

ESP
AS Blainville U19
4

L2Q
CS Trident
3

L3Q
CS Boréal d'Alma
2

L2Q
FC Trident
4
