= 2023 Ligue1 Québec season =

Ligue1 Québec Men's Division
- Season: 2023
- Dates: May 6 – September 30
- Champions: CS St-Laurent
- Coupe L1QC: CS St-Laurent
- Matches: 132
- Goals: 431 (3.27 per match)
- Top goalscorer: Adama Sissoko (19 goals)

The 2023 Ligue1 Québec season is the twelfth season of play for the Ligue1 Québec (and the first since rebranding from the Première ligue de soccer du Québec). L1Q is a division three semi-professional soccer league in the Canadian soccer league system and the highest level of soccer based in the Canadian province of Québec.

FC Laval competed in the 2023 Canadian Championship as the league's representative as 2022 league champions.

CS St-Laurent won their first league title and qualified for the 2024 Canadian Championship.

== Main Division ==
=== Teams ===
Twelve teams will participate in the 2023 season. The league champion will earn a place in the 2024 Canadian Championship.

Team	City	Stadium	Head coach
A.S. Blainville	Blainville, Laurentides	Parc Blainville	Emmanuel Macagno
Celtix du Haut-Richelieu	Saint-Jean-sur-Richelieu, Montérégie	Parc Pierre-Benoît	Steve Francon
CS Lanaudière-Nord	Joliette, Lanaudière	École secondaire Barthélemy-Joliette	Sylvestre Rukondo
AS Laval	Laval, Laval	Parc de Lausanne	Billy Zagakos
FC Laval	Laval, Laval	Collège Montmorency & Parc Roseval	Boubacar Coulibaly
CS Longueuil	Longueuil, Montérégie	Parc Laurier	Seyni Camara
CF Montréal U23	Montréal, Montréal	Centre Nutrilait	Patrick Viollat
CS Mont-Royal Outremont	Mount Royal, Montréal	Parc Recreatif de TMR	Luc Brutus
CS Saint-Laurent	Saint-Laurent, Montreal	Vanier College Stadium	Nicolas Razzaghi
CS St-Hubert	Saint-Hubert, Montérégie	Centre Sportif Roseanne-Laflamme	Nasson Theosmy
Ottawa South United	Ottawa, Ontario	TAAG Park at Carleton University	Peter Mapendere
Royal-Sélect de Beauport	Quebec City, Capitale-Nationale	Stade Beauport	Samir Ghrib

=== Standings ===
Pos	Team	Pld	W	D	L	GF	GA	GD	Pts	Qualification
1	CS Saint-Laurent (C)	22	18	1	3	68	20	+48	55	2024 Canadian Championship
2	Royal-Sélect de Beauport	22	13	6	3	45	27	+18	45	
3	CS Mont-Royal Outremont	22	12	5	5	35	18	+17	41	
4	FC Laval	22	12	4	6	45	34	+11	40	
5	CF Montréal U23	22	12	4	6	29	23	+6	40	
6	CS St-Hubert	22	8	6	8	34	35	−1	30	
7	AS Blainville	22	9	3	10	36	35	+1	30	
8	CS Longueuil	22	7	5	10	31	33	−2	26	
9	AS Laval	22	7	3	12	30	36	−6	24	
10	Celtix du Haut-Richelieu	22	5	5	12	35	53	−18	20	
11	Ottawa South United	22	5	4	13	25	48	−23	18 (Note: Ottawa South United was deducted 1 point for defaulting one match.)	
12	CS Lanaudière-Nord	22	0	2	20	18	69	−51	2	

Source: Spordle
(C) Champions

==== Top scorers ====
Rank	Player	Club	Goals
1	Adama Makan Sissoko	FC Laval	19
2	Loïc Adrien Kwemi	CS Saint-Laurent	17
3	Yann Régis Toualy	CS Saint-Laurent	12
4	Evans Eze	AS Blainville	11
5	Dylan Ngono	Celtix du Haut-Richelieu	8
5	Rickson Aristilde	FC Laval	8
5	Safwane Mlah	CS Saint-Laurent	8
5	Alexandre Marcoux	AS Blainville	8
5	Josué Desire Youta	CS Saint-Laurent	8
10	Jordan Ogla Mbala	CS Longueuil	7
10	Bonano Beugré Gnenago	Royal-Sélect de Beauport	7
10	Guesly Alexandre	CF Montréal Academy	7

==== Awards ====
Award	Player (club)
Ballon d'or (Best Player)	Safwane Mlah (CS Saint-Laurent)
Ballon d'argent (2nd Best Player)	Adama Makan Sissoko (FC Laval)
Ballon de bronze (3rd Best Player)	Heikel Jarras (Royal-Sélect de Beauport)
Soulier D'Or (Golden Boot - Top Scorer)	Adama Makan Sissoko (FC Laval)
Gant D'Or (Golden Glove - Top Goalkeeper)	Kosta Maniatis (CS Saint-Laurent)
Coach of the Year	Nicholas Razzaghi (CS Saint-Laurent)

=== Coupe L1QC ===
The two Coupe PLSQ finalists from the previous season (AS Blainville and Celtix du Haut-Richelieu) advanced directly to the Quarter-Final round. Two additional clubs (FC Laval and RS Beauport) were selected by a random draw to also advance directly to the Quarter-Final round.

First Round; October 7–8
CS Longueuil	0
CS St-Laurent	6
CS St-Hubert	0
AS Laval	2
CS Lanaudière-Nord	4
Ottawa South United	2
CS Mont-Royal Outremont	3
CF Montréal U23	0

Quarter-Finals; October 14
AS Blainville	1
CS St-Laurent	4
Royal-Sélect de Beauport	5
AS Laval	0
FC Laval	2 (4)
CS Lanaudière-Nord	2 (5)
Celtix du Haut-Richelieu	0
CS Mont-Royal Outremont	2

Semi-Finals; October 21
CS St-Laurent	4
Royal-Sélect de Beauport	1
CS Lanaudière-Nord	0
CS Mont-Royal Outremont	3

Final; October 28
CS St-Laurent	2
CS Mont-Royal Outremont	0

Source: Spordle

=== Friendlies ===
May 31, 2023	Vermont Green FC	3–0	CS Mont-Royal Outremont	Burlington, Vermont, United States
7:00 PM	Martin 16'; Pope 47'; Krioutchenkov	Report		Stadium: Virtue Field

== Reserve Division ==
The league will operate a reserve division. Each team, apart from the CF Montréal Academy, will operate a reserve team, playing each other once. Pierrefonds FC, who play in the women's division but not the men's, will field a team in the division as well

=== First Phase ===
Pos	Team	Pld	W	D	L	GF	GA	GD	Pts
1	CS Saint-Laurent Reserves	11	9	1	1	29	16	+13	28
2	CS Longueuil Reserves	11	6	4	1	20	11	+9	22
3	AS Laval Reserves	11	6	2	3	31	17	+14	20
4	FC Laval Reserves	11	5	4	2	22	16	+6	19
5	CS St-Hubert Reserves	11	5	3	3	25	18	+7	18
6	Royal-Sélect de Beauport Reserves	11	5	1	5	22	20	+2	16
7	AS Blainville Reserves	11	4	4	3	22	17	+5	16
8	Pierrefonds FC	11	3	2	6	10	20	−10	11
9	Ottawa South United Reserves	11	3	2	6	17	23	−6	11
10	CS Mont-Royal Outremont Reserves	11	2	4	5	8	16	−8	10
11	Celtix du Haut-Richelieu Reserves	11	2	0	9	13	30	−17	6
12	CS Lanaudière-Nord Reserves	11	1	3	7	12	27	−15	6

Source: Spordle
Rules for classification: 1) points; 2) total wins; 3) head-to-head points; 4) goal differential; 5) most goals

=== Second phase ===
Upon the conclusion of the Reserve Division, the league ran a short second phase, divided into two groups, with all the teams returning except for Ottawa South United.

Group A

Pos	Team	Pld	W	D	L	GF	GA	GD	Pts	Qualification
1	CS Saint-Laurent Reserves	4	3	1	0	18	5	+13	10	Championship final
2	FC Laval Reserves	4	2	1	1	18	8	+10	7	
3	CS St-Hubert Reserves	3	2	0	1	8	5	+3	6	
4	CS Lanaudière-Nord Reserves	3	1	0	2	6	19	−13	3	
5	Pierrefonds FC	4	0	0	4	2	15	−13	0	

Source: Spordle
Rules for classification: 1) points; 2) total wins; 3) head-to-head points; 4) goal differential; 5) most goals

Group B

Pos	Team	Pld	W	D	L	GF	GA	GD	Pts	Qualification
1	CS Longueuil Reserves (C)	5	4	1	0	13	7	+6	13	Championship final
2	AS Laval Reserves	5	3	1	1	14	7	+7	10	
3	CS Mont-Royal Outremont Reserves	5	2	1	2	8	9	−1	7	
4	AS Blainville Reserves	5	2	1	2	11	10	+1	7	
5	Royal-Sélect de Beauport Reserves	5	1	1	3	7	11	−4	4	
6	Celtix du Haut-Richelieu Reserves	5	0	1	4	5	14	−9	1	

Source: Spordle
Rules for classification: 1) points; 2) total wins; 3) head-to-head points; 4) goal differential; 5) most goals
(C) Champions

Championship Final

Final; September 16
A1	CS Saint-Laurent Reserves	0
B1	CS Longueuil Reserves	1

==== Awards ====
Award	Player (club)
Ballon d'or (Best Player)	Djamel Mekallach Chellali (CS Longueuil Reserves)
Ballon d'argent (2nd Best Player)	Nicholas Minchillo (CS Saint-Laurent Reserves)
Ballon de bronze (3rd Best Player)	Zineddine Bey (AS Laval Reserves)
Soulier D'Or (Golden Boot - Top Scorer)	Zineddine Bey (AS Laval Reserves)
Gant D'Or (Golden Glove - Top Goalkeeper)	Alexis Desjardins (CS Longueuil Reserves)
