= 2025 Ligue1 Québec féminine season =

Football league season in Quebec, Canada

Ligue1 Québec Women's Division
- Season: 2025
- Dates: April 13 – July 26 (regular season)

The 2025 Ligue1 Québec féminine season was the eighth season of play for Ligue1 Québec (and the third since rebranding from the Première ligue de soccer du Québec), a Division 3 women's soccer league in the Canadian soccer pyramid and the highest level of soccer based in the Canadian province of Québec.

== Changes from 2024 ==
Pierrefonds FC withdrew from the league after the 2024 season. A new second tier division was formed following the dissolution of the amateur Ligue de soccer élite du Québec.

== Format ==
In Ligue1 Québec, the eleven teams will be split into two divisions (one of five and the other of six), playing each other team in their division home and away, as well as playing the teams in the other division once. The top two teams in each division will advance to the playoffs with the winner advancing to the Women's Inter-Provincial Championship. The bottom two teams (based on points per game) will be relegated to Ligue2 Québec.

In Ligue2 Québec, the 19 teams will play each other each once. At the end of the season, the top team will be promoted to Ligue1 Québec for the 2026 season, while the teams finishing 12th through 19th will be relegated to their respective interregional league. Upon CS St-Hubert's removal from Ligue1 during the season, an additional promotion spot was added for Ligue2, with the clubs finishing 2nd through 5th advancing to the promotion playoffs.

== Ligue1 Québec ==
=== Teams ===
Eleven teams will participate in the 2025 season.

| Team | City | Stadium | Head coach |
|---|---|---|---|
| A.S. Blainville | Blainville, Laurentides | Parc Blainville | |
| AS Chaudière-Ouest | Lévis, Quebec | Parc Renaud-Maillette | |
| Celtix du Haut-Richelieu | Saint-Jean-sur-Richelieu, Montérégie | Parc Pierre-Benoît | |
| AS Laval | Laval, Laval | Parc de Lausanne | |
| FC Laval | Laval, Laval | Parc Roseval & Parc Raymond-Millar | |
| CS Longueuil | Longueuil, Montérégie | Parc Laurier | |
| CS Mont-Royal Outremont | Mount Royal, Montréal | Parc Recreatif de TMR | |
| CS St-Hubert | Saint-Hubert, Montérégie | Centre Sportif Roseanne-Laflamme | |
| Ottawa South United | Ottawa, Ontario | TAAG Park (Carleton University) | |
| CF Montréal Academy | Montreal, Montréal | Centre Sportif Bois-de-Boulogne | |
| Royal-Sélect de Beauport | Beauport, Quebec City | Stade Beauport | |

=== Standings ===
==== Group A ====
| Pos | Team | Pld | W | D | L | GF | GA | GD | Pts | Qualification |
|---|---|---|---|---|---|---|---|---|---|---|
| 1 | FC Laval | 13 | 8 | 1 | 4 | 21 | 16 | +5 | 25 | Advance to Final Four playoffs |
| 2 | CS Mont-Royal Outremont (C) | 13 | 7 | 3 | 3 | 23 | 9 | +14 | 24 | Advance to Final Four playoffs |
| 3 | CS Longueuil | 13 | 7 | 1 | 5 | 17 | 10 | +7 | 22 | |
| 4 | AS Blainville | 13 | 4 | 3 | 6 | 17 | 20 | −3 | 15 | |
| 5 | AS Laval | 13 | 1 | 0 | 12 | 10 | 30 | −20 | 3 | |

Source: Spordle
Rules for classification: 1) points; 2) total wins; 3) head-to-head points; 4) goal differential; 5) most goals
(C) Champions

==== Group B ====
After the eighth match of the season, CS St-Hubert was removed from the league, with all match results vacated, following multiple forfeits.

| Pos | Team | Pld | W | D | L | GF | GA | GD | Pts | Qualification |
|---|---|---|---|---|---|---|---|---|---|---|
| 1 | CF Montréal Academy | 13 | 9 | 2 | 2 | 26 | 8 | +18 | 29 | Advance to Final Four playoffs |
| 2 | Royal-Sélect de Beauport | 13 | 8 | 1 | 4 | 19 | 14 | +5 | 25 | Advance to Final Four playoffs |
| 3 | Celtix du Haut-Richelieu | 13 | 8 | 1 | 4 | 22 | 13 | +9 | 25 | |
| 4 | Ottawa South United | 13 | 5 | 2 | 6 | 23 | 27 | −4 | 17 | |
| 5 | Rapides de Chaudière-Ouest | 13 | 1 | 0 | 12 | 7 | 38 | −31 | 3 | |
| 6 | CS St-Hubert (R) | 0 | – | – | – | – | – | — | 0 | Removed from league midseason, relegated to Ligue2 |

Source: Spordle
Rules for classification: 1) points; 2) total wins; 3) head-to-head points; 4) goal differential; 5) most goals
(R) Relegated

==== Playoffs ====
The top two teams in each division advanced to the playoffs. The winner advanced to the League1 Canada Interprovincial Championship.

Semifinals; July 29-30
A1 | FC Laval | 2
B2 | Royal-Sélect de Beauport | 1
B1 | CF Montréal Academy | 0
A2 | CS Mont-Royal Outremont | 1

Championship Game; August 3
A1 | FC Laval | 1
A2 | CS Mont-Royal Outremont | 3

Source: Spordle

=== Statistics ===
Top goalscorers
(does not include playoffs)

| Rank | Player | Club | Goals |
|---|---|---|---|
| 1 | (Canada) Hosane Soukou | CF Montréal Academy | 10 |
| 1 | (Canada) Cindy Yang | Ottawa South United | 10 |
| 3 | (Canada) Victoria Dupont | Celtix du Haut-Richelieu | 7 |
| 4 | (Haiti) Laurie-Ann Moïse | FC Laval | 6 |
| 4 | (Canada) Lea-Jeanne Fortier | Royal-Sélect de Beauport | 6 |
| 6 | (Canada) Rosa Maalouf | Ottawa South United | 5 |
| 7 | 6 players tied | | 4 |

Source: Spordle

==== Awards ====
| Award | Player (club) | Ref |
|---|---|---|
| Ballon d'or (Best Player) | Léa Palacio-Tellier (CS Mont-Royal Outremont) | |
| Soulier D'Or (Golden Boot - Top Scorer) | Hosane Soukou (CF Montréal Academy); Cindy Yang (Ottawa South United) | |
| Gant D'Or (Golden Glove - Top Goalkeeper) | Khadijah Cissé (CF Montréal Academy) | |
| Coach of the Year | Wilfried Emmanuel Monthe (CS Mont-Royal Outremont) | |

== Ligue2 Québec ==
=== Teams ===
Nineteen teams will participate in the division.

| Team | City | Stadium |
Current teams
| AS Brossard | Boisbriand, Laurentides | |
| AS Gatineau | Gatineau, Outaouais | |
| CF L'International de Québec | Quebec City | |
| CS Boucherville | Boucherville | |
| CS du Bas-Richelieu | Sorel-Tracy | |
| CS Fury de Rimouski | Rimouski | |
| CS LaSalle | Montréal | |
| CS Roussilion | Saint-Constant | |
| CS Saint-Laurent | Saint-Laurent, Montreal | Vanier College Stadium |
| CS Trident | Quebec City | |
| CS Trois-Rivières | Trois-Rivières | |
| FC Anjou | Anjou | |
| Lakeshore SC | Kirkland, Montréal | |
| CS Lanaudière-Nord | Joliette, Lanaudière | |
| CS Lévis-Est | Lévis | |
| CS Mistral de Sherbrooke | Sherbrooke | |
| CS Phénix des Rivières | Quebec City | |
| Revolution FC | Saint-Eustache | |
| CS Union Lanaudière Sud | Repentigny | |

=== Standings ===
| Pos | Team | Pld | W | D | L | GF | GA | GD | Pts | Qualification |
|---|---|---|---|---|---|---|---|---|---|---|
| 1 | Lakeshore SC (C, P) | 18 | 16 | 1 | 1 | 60 | 13 | +47 | 49 | Promoted to 2026 Ligue1 Québec |
| 2 | CS Trident | 18 | 15 | 2 | 1 | 70 | 15 | +55 | 47 | Qualified for Promotion Playoffs |
| 3 | AS Brossard | 18 | 12 | 3 | 3 | 48 | 16 | +32 | 39 | Qualified for Promotion Playoffs |
| 4 | CS Trois-Rivières | 18 | 12 | 1 | 5 | 48 | 23 | +25 | 37 | Qualified for Promotion Playoffs |
| 5 | CS St-Laurent (P) | 18 | 10 | 3 | 5 | 57 | 16 | +41 | 33 | Qualified for Promotion Playoffs |
| 6 | CS Boucherville | 18 | 8 | 7 | 3 | 41 | 16 | +25 | 31 | |
| 7 | CS LaSalle | 18 | 9 | 3 | 6 | 41 | 24 | +17 | 30 | |
| 8 | CS Lévis-Est | 18 | 9 | 3 | 6 | 34 | 21 | +13 | 30 | |
| 9 | Revolution FC | 18 | 8 | 4 | 6 | 29 | 14 | +15 | 28 | |
| 10 | AS Gatineau | 18 | 8 | 4 | 6 | 33 | 34 | −1 | 28 | |
| 11 | CS Fury de Rimouski | 18 | 8 | 4 | 6 | 29 | 35 | −6 | 28 | |
| 12 | CS Union Lanaudière Sud (R) | 18 | 6 | 8 | 4 | 31 | 19 | +12 | 26 | Relegated to 2026 Ligue3 Québec |
| 13 | CS du Bas-Richelieu (R) | 18 | 6 | 2 | 10 | 21 | 30 | −9 | 20 | Relegated to 2026 Ligue3 Québec |
| 14 | CS Mistral de Sherbrooke (R) | 18 | 6 | 2 | 10 | 32 | 40 | −8 | 20 | Relegated to 2026 Ligue3 Québec |
| 15 | CS Roussilion (R) | 18 | 5 | 0 | 13 | 15 | 30 | −15 | 15 | Relegated to 2026 Ligue3 Québec |
| 16 | CF L'International de Québec (R) | 18 | 4 | 2 | 12 | 23 | 62 | −39 | 14 | Relegated to 2026 Ligue3 Québec |
| 17 | CS Phénix des Rivières (R) | 18 | 2 | 0 | 16 | 12 | 84 | −72 | 6 | Relegated to 2026 Ligue3 Québec |
| 18 | FC Anjou (R) | 18 | 1 | 0 | 17 | 8 | 88 | −80 | 3 | Departed league after season |
| 19 | CS Lanaudière-Nord (R) | 18 | 0 | 3 | 15 | 10 | 62 | −52 | 3 | Departed league after season |

Source: Spordle
(C) Champions; (P) Promoted; (R) Relegated

==== Promotion playoffs ====
Initially there was not a promotion playoff scheduled. However, upon CS St-Hubert's removal from the top division mid-season, an additional promotion spot was added.

Semifinals; July 30-August 17
2 | CS Trident | 1
5 | CS St-Laurent | 3
3 | AS Brossard | 1(4)
4 | CS Trois-Rivières | 1(2)

Championship Game; September 1
5 | CS St-Laurent | 1
3 | AS Brossard | 0

Source: Spordle

=== Statistics ===
Top goalscorers
(does not include playoffs)

| Rank | Player | Club | Goals |
|---|---|---|---|
| 1 | (Canada) Leia Khairy | CS Saint-Laurent | 20 |
| 2 | (Canada) Kristina Syragakis | Lakeshore SC | 19 |
| 3 | (Canada) Kayla Adrianne Kamdem | Lakeshore SC | 16 |
| 4 | (Canada) Allie Martin | CS LaSalle | 15 |
| 4 | (Canada) Elianne Gervais | AS Gatineau | 15 |
| 4 | (Canada) Celine Deraedt Sfyrogiannakis | CS Trois-Rivières | 15 |
| 7 | (Canada) Andrea Roy | CS Boucherville | 13 |
| 8 | (Canada) Mathilde Beaudry | CS Trident | 12 |
| 8 | (Canada) Anaïs Bujold Samson | CS Trident | 12 |
| 10 | (Canada) Mahelie Barbeau | AS Brossard | 10 |
| 10 | (Canada) Sarah Roy | CS Boucherville | 10 |

Source: Spordle

==== Awards ====
| Award | Player (club) | Ref |
|---|---|---|
| Ballon d'or (Best Player) | Kristina Syragakis (Lakeshore SC) | |
| Soulier D'Or (Golden Boot - Top Scorer) | Leia Khairy (CS St-Laurent) | |
| Gant D'Or (Golden Glove - Top Goalkeeper) | Danica Watson (Lakeshore SC) | |

== Ligue Espoirs Québec ==
The league operated a U21 reserve division this season.

| Pos | Team | Pld | W | D | L | GF | GA | GD | Pts | |
|---|---|---|---|---|---|---|---|---|---|---|
| 1 | CF Montréal Academy | 16 | 13 | 1 | 2 | 61 | 8 | +53 | 40 | Advance to Final Four playoffs |
| 2 | Ottawa South United U21 (C) | 16 | 13 | 1 | 2 | 58 | 13 | +45 | 40 | Advance to Final Four playoffs |
| 3 | Royal-Sélect de Beauport U21 | 16 | 13 | 0 | 3 | 47 | 12 | +35 | 39 | Advance to Final Four playoffs |
| 4 | AS Blainville U21 | 16 | 11 | 3 | 2 | 56 | 24 | +32 | 36 | Advance to Final Four playoffs |
| 5 | CS Trois-Rivières U21 | 16 | 11 | 3 | 2 | 30 | 15 | +15 | 36 | |
| 6 | CS St-Laurent U21 | 16 | 11 | 1 | 4 | 38 | 21 | +17 | 34 | |
| 7 | FC Laval U21 | 16 | 7 | 3 | 6 | 36 | 28 | +8 | 24 | |
| 8 | CS Longueuil U21 | 16 | 7 | 3 | 6 | 33 | 24 | +9 | 24 | |
| 9 | Revolution FC U21 | 16 | 6 | 3 | 7 | 23 | 22 | +1 | 21 | |
| 10 | CS LaSalle U21 | 16 | 6 | 3 | 7 | 28 | 27 | +1 | 21 | |
| 11 | CS Boucherville U21 | 16 | 3 | 6 | 7 | 18 | 39 | −21 | 15 | |
| 12 | CS Mont-Royal Outremont U21 | 16 | 4 | 2 | 10 | 14 | 32 | −18 | 14 | |
| 13 | Rapides de Chaudière-Ouest U21 | 16 | 4 | 1 | 11 | 25 | 52 | −27 | 13 | |
| 14 | CS Lévis-Est U21 | 16 | 3 | 2 | 11 | 15 | 49 | −34 | 11 | |
| 15 | CS Trident U21 | 16 | 2 | 4 | 10 | 15 | 41 | −26 | 10 | |
| 16 | CS Roussilion U21 | 16 | 1 | 3 | 12 | 18 | 61 | −43 | 6 | |
| 17 | CS Mistral de Sherbrooke U21 | 16 | 1 | 1 | 14 | 9 | 56 | −47 | 4 | |

Source: Spordle
(C) Champions

=== Playoffs ===
The top four teams in each division will advance to the playoffs.

Semifinals; August 23
1 | CF Montréal Academy | 5
4 | AS Blainville U21 | 0
2 | Ottawa South United U21 | 4
3 | Royal-Sélect de Beauport U21 | 0

Championship Game; August 30
1 | CF Montréal Academy | 1(2)
2 | Ottawa South United U21 | 1(3)

Source: Spordle

==== Awards ====
| Award | Player (club) | Ref |
|---|---|---|
| Ballon d'or (Best Player) | Aaliyah Picquet (CF Montréal Academy) | |
| Soulier D'Or (Golden Boot - Top Scorer) | Aaliyah Picquet (CF Montréal Academy) | |
| Gant D'Or (Golden Glove - Top Goalkeeper) | Megan Lemieux (CF Montréal Academy) | |
