= Kevin Cossette =

Canadian soccer player

Personal information
- Full name: Kevin Cossette
- Date of birth: January 9, 1990 (age 36)
- Place of birth: Greenfield Park, Quebec, Canada
- Height: 1.73 m (5 ft 8 in)
- Position: Midfielder

Team information
- Current team: Royal-Sélect de Beauport

Youth career
- Inter St-Hyacinthe
- Cosmos de Granby
- FC Sélect Rive-Sud

College career
Years	Team	Apps	(Gls)
2011–2014	Laval Rouge et Or		

Senior career*
Years	Team	Apps	(Gls)
2009	Trois-Rivières Attak	18	(3)
2010–2011	Montreal Impact Academy	18	(2)
2010	→ Montreal Impact (loan)	3	(0)
2013–2015	Royal-Sélect de Beauport	41	(5)
2015	Louisville City FC	4	(0)
2016	Royal-Sélect de Beauport	21	(1)
2017–2019	Dynamo de Québec	51	(7)
2020–2021	AS Blainville	16	(1)
2022–	Royal-Sélect de Beauport	15	(0)

International career
2013	Québec		
- * Club domestic league appearances and goals as of October 2, 2022

Kevin Cossette (born January 9, 1990) is a Canadian soccer player who plays for Première Ligue de soccer du Québec club Royal-Sélect de Beauport.

== Early life ==
Cossette was born in Greenfield Park, Quebec and grew up in Saint-Hyacinthe, Quebec. He played for numerous amateur and youth teams between 2002 and 2007, including Inter St-Hyacinthe, Cosmos Granby AAA, FC Sélect Rive-Sud AAA and Champlain College AAA.

== Club career ==
He played for Montreal Impact's junior affiliate, Trois-Rivières Attak, in the Canadian Soccer League in 2009, scoring 3 goals in 18 games, prior to formally joining the Montreal Impact Academy in 2010.

Cossette was called up to the senior Montreal Impact squad in the summer of 2010, and made his debut for the team on July 3, 2010, in a game against the Rochester Rhinos. He attended preseason with the club in 2011, but was released at the very end of the camp, failing to make the 2011 roster.

In 2011, he decided to go to university attending Université Laval, where he played for the soccer team. Starting in 2013, he played with Royal-Sélect de Beauport in the Ligue de Soccer Elite Quebec, the top amateur division in Quebec.

After graduating in 2015, he attended tryouts with USL clubs Rochester Rhinos and Pittsburgh Riverhounds SC, before ultimately signing with Louisville City FC. He became the first Laval graduate to sign a professional soccer contract. After the season, he received a contract offer from Pittsburgh, however, due to the low salary, he instead returned to his home in Quebec and re-joined Beauport.

In 2017, he joined Dynamo de Quebec in the semi-professional Première Ligue de soccer du Québec. In 2020, after Dynamo left the PLSQ, he joined AS Blainville.

== Coaching career ==
Beginning in 2016, he worked as the technical director of the AS Mistral Laurentien, and in 2020, he joined the Richelieu Valley club in a similar capacity.
