= 2019 Première ligue de soccer du Québec féminine season =

Première ligue de soccer du Québec Women's Division
- Season: 2019
- Champions: CS Monteuil
- Matches: 45
- Goals: 167 (3.71 per match)
- Top goalscorer: Sarah Humes (14) (AS Blainville)

The 2019 Première ligue de soccer du Québec féminine season was the second season of play for the Première ligue de soccer du Québec, a Division 3 women's soccer league in the Canadian soccer pyramid and the highest level of soccer based in the Canadian province of Québec.

Dynamo de Quebec was the defending champion for the women's division. CS Fabrose won their first title this season.

== Changes from 2018 ==
The women's division moved up to six teams. Lakers du Lac Saint-Louis did not return for 2019 and transferred their team to CS Mont-Royal Outremont, and CS Fabrose launched a team.

== Teams ==
Six teams participated in the 2021 season. Each team played against every other team once. At the end of the season, the top four teams will qualify for the first edition of the League Cup (Coupe PLSQ).

Team	City	Stadium
A.S. Blainville	Blainville, Laurentides	Parc Blainville
CS Fabrose	Laval, Laval	Collège Montmorency
CS Mont-Royal Outremont	Mount Royal, Montréal	Parc Recreatif de TMR
CS Monteuil	Laval, Laval	Parc de Lausanne/Parc Bois-de-Boulogne
Dynamo de Québec	Quebec City, Capitale-Nationale	Various home stadiums
FC Sélect Rive-Sud	Longueuil, Montérégie	Various home stadiums

== Standings ==
Pos	Team	Pld	W	D	L	GF	GA	GD	Pts
1	CS Monteuil (C)	15	10	3	2	29	17	+12	33
2	Dynamo de Québec	15	9	4	2	46	18	+28	31
3	A.S. Blainville	15	7	4	4	46	30	+16	25
4	CS Fabrose	15	3	4	8	19	33	−14	13
5	FC Sélect Rive-Sud	15	3	3	9	14	35	−21	12
6	CS Mont-Royal Outremont	15	2	4	9	13	34	−21	10

Source: PLSQ
(C) Champions

=== Top scorers ===
Rank	Player	Club	Goals
1	Sarah Humes	AS Blainville	14
2	Évelyne Viens	Dynamo de Québec	13
3	Roseline Eloissaint	AS Blainville	11
4	Mireille Patry	Dynamo de Québec	10
5	Jessica Bunker	Dynamo de Québec	8
5	Dominique Fortin	Dynamo de Québec	8
5	Cassandra Provost	CS Monteuil	8

=== Awards ===
Award	Player (club)	Ref
Ballon d'or (Best Player)	Sophie Thérien (CS Monteuil)	
Ballon d'argent (2nd Best Player)	Sarah Humes (AS Blainville)	
Ballon de bronze (3rd Best Player)	Évelyne Viens (Dynamo de Québec)	
Golden Boot (Top Scorer)	Sarah Humes (AS Blainville)	
Coach of the Year	David Cerasuolo (CS Monteuil)	
