= Dynamo de Quebec =

Soccer team in Québec City

- Founded: 1991
- Stadium: Stade Honco de Lévis, Lévis, QC; Terrain des Athlétiques, l'Ancienne-Lorette, QC
- Owner: Association Regional de Soccer du Quebec
- Manager: (France) Edmond Foyé
- League: Première ligue de soccer du Québec
- 2019: PLSQ-M, 3rd PLSQ-F, 2nd
Home colours	Away colours

Dynamo de Québec was a professional Canadian soccer team based in Québec City. The team represented the Capitale-Nationale region in the PLSQ, which its men's side joined in 2017, and its women's side the year after until 2019. The team is affiliated to the Association Régionale de Soccer de Québec, and has its roots as the association's elite player-development program.

== Club history ==
=== Early years ===
Dynamo was founded in 1991 as an elite player-development program for young women in the Quebec City area, and the first U14 teams began play that year in the Ligue de Soccer Elite Quebec. Between 1991 and 2007, 19 Dynamo teams were Quebec champions and participated in the Canadian Championships, with four teams being crowned Canadian Champions.

=== Women's team ===
The women's team played in the United States-based W-League beginning in 2009. They were originally known as Quebec City Amiral or Quebec City Arsenal, but was renamed to Quebec Dynamo ARSQ in 2014 following a lawsuit by English club Arsenal F.C. who held that trademark in Canada. The team played in as the until the league disbanded in 2015. The club tried to join the United Women's Soccer but was unsuccessful and was thus rendered inactive in 2016.

=== Revival in PLSQ ===
In 2017, the Dynamo created a new men's team to play in the Première ligue de soccer du Québec. In preparation to their debut in PLSQ, the team started with 1–0 win over the Mistral de Sherbrooke. Confident from this first preseason win, the team went on to face AS Blainville (2nd in the standings in 2016) and tied them 1-1. The first game in the Dynamo's PLSQ history is on Sunday May 14, 2017 at home at Stade Honco in Charny. The visitors, Mont-Royal Outremont, proved to be a strong adversary and the Dynamo lost their first game in PLSQ. They departed the league after the 2019 season, due to a lack of funding.

For 2018, the PLSQ would start a new women's division, and Dynamo re-formed their women's side, which previously competed in the USL W-League as the Quebec Dynamo ARSQ, to participate, and headlined the squad with Canada WNT player and Quebec native Gabrielle Carle. The club would leave Charny for a number of different home venues around the Capitale-Nationale region, but the majority of their home games for both the men's and new women's sides would be played in the town of L'Ancienne-Lorette at the field of the local polyvalente (high school). On the men's side, star goalkeeper Mario Gerges departed the team during the preseason for TSS FC Rovers of the Premier Development League, but overall the squad saw the return of many important players from the previous season, and looked to improve on a surprise 2nd-place finish.

== Seasons ==
Men

Season	League	Teams	Record	Rank	League Cup	Ref
2017	Première Ligue de soccer du Québec	7	9–4–5	2nd	–	
2018	Première Ligue de soccer du Québec	8	7–6–8	5th	Semi-finals	
2019	Première Ligue de soccer du Québec	9	7–6–3	3rd	Group stage	

Women

Season	League	Division	Teams	Record	Rank	Playoffs	Ref
2009	USL W-League	Great Lakes Division	8 (37)	9–4–1	3rd, GLD	Did not qualify	
2010	USL W-League	Great Lakes Division	6 (29)	6–4–2	4th, GLD	Did not qualify	
2011	USL W-League	Great Lakes Division	7 (27)	6–5–1	3rd, GLD	Quarter-final	
2012	USL W-League	Great Lakes Division	7 (30)	8–2–2	2nd, GLD	4th	
2013	USL W-League	Central Conference	6 (25)	3–7–2	5th, CC	Did not qualify	
2014	USL W-League	Central Conference	6 (25)	1–8–3	5th, CC	Did not qualify	
2015	USL W-League	Northeastern Conference	6 (18)	8–2–2	2nd, NEC	4th	
2016	on hiatus						
2017	on hiatus						
2018	Première Ligue de soccer du Québec		5	9–2–1	Champions	–	
2019	Première Ligue de soccer du Québec		6	9–4–2	2nd	–	

== Notable former players ==
The following players have either played at the professional or international level, either before or after playing for the PLSQ team:

- (Canada) Kevin Cossette
- (Canada) Mathilde Lachance
- (Canada) Évelyne Viens

== Supporter groups ==
- Section Ludovica: Created in 2012, this independent supporter group has decided to support and cheer for the club in the spirit of solidarity and amiability. This group is growing and their cheers are an integral part of the Dynamo game-day experience. At the Stade Honco in Charny, Section Ludovica takes a prominent place in the eastern section of the stands, near the section where players come into the field.

== See also ==
- Première ligue de soccer du Québec
- Fédération de soccer du Québec
- Laval Rouge et Or
