= AS Gatineau =

Canadian semi-professional soccer club

- Full name: Association de Soccer de Gatineau
- League: Ligue2 Québec
- 2025: L2Q, 2nd - promoted (men); L2Q, 10th (women)
- Website: https://soccerasg.ca/

Association de Soccer de Gatineau is a Canadian semi-professional soccer club based in Gatineau, Quebec, that plays in Ligue2 Québec.

== History ==
Originally founded as CS Gatineau-Ouest. In 1991, the club merged with AS Gatineau-Est to form AS Gatineau. In June 2022, the club became a youth affiliate club of Canadian Premier League club Atlético Ottawa.

In November 2024, the club joined the men's and women's divisions of the newly formed semi-pro Ligue2 Québec division for the 2025 season. On April 12, 2025, they played their first match, where they were defeated 3-2 by Union Lanaudière Sud. In their next two matches, they recorded their first wins, defeating FC Boréal and Revolution FC, before recording their first draw against CS Montréal Centre.

== Year-by-year ==
Men

Season	League	Teams	Record	Rank	League Cup	Ref
2025	Ligue2 Québec	24	16–5–2	2nd (promoted)	–	

Women

Season	League	Teams	Record	Rank	Playoffs	League Cup	Ref
2025	Ligue2 Québec	19	8–4–6	10th	–	–	
