= CS LaSalle =

Canadian semi-professional soccer club

- Full name: Club Soccer de LaSalle
- Nickname: Les Rapides
- Founded: 1986
- League: Ligue2 Québec
- 2025: L2Q, 1st (men); L2Q, 7th (women)
- Website: https://www.lasallesoccer.ca/

Club Soccer de LaSalle is a Canadian semi-professional soccer club based in LaSalle, Quebec, that plays in Ligue2 Québec.

== History ==
CS LaSalle was founded as a youth soccer club in 1986. In 2025, despite not previously having a senior program, they entered semi-pro teams in the men's and women's divisions in the new Ligue2 Québec, the second tier of the Ligue1 Québec system. On April 12, 2025, they drew 1-1 with CS Montréal Centre, in the first-ever match in the division. At the end of the first season, the men's team won the inaugural Ligue2 title, earning promotion to Ligue1 Québec for the 2026 season.

== Year-by-year ==
Men

Season	League	Teams	Record	Rank	League Cup	Ref
2025	Ligue2 Québec	24	18–5–0	Champions	–	

Women

Season	League	Teams	Record	Rank	Playoffs	League Cup	Ref
2025	Ligue2 Québec	19	9–3–6	7th	–	–	

== Notable former players ==
The following players have either played at the professional or international level, either before or after playing for the L1Q team:

- (Canada) (Cameroon) Loïc Kwemi
