= Royal-Sélect de Beauport =

- Full name: Association de Soccer de Beauport
- Founded: 1974
- Stadium: Stade Beauport
- Head Coach: Samir Ghrib (men); Michel Fisher (women)
- League: Ligue1 Québec
- 2025: L1Q, 3rd (men); L1Q, 3rd; Playoffs, SF (women)
- Website: https://www.asbroyal.ca/
Home colours	Away colours

Royal-Sélect de Beauport is a Canadian soccer club that plays in the semi-professional Ligue1 Québec. They won the Canadian Challenge Trophy, a national amateur competition, in 2012.

== History ==
Royal-Sélect de Beauport was founded in 1974.

In 2009, the club reached the finals of the Challenge Trophy, which is a national amateur soccer cup in Canada contested by the champions of individual provincial soccer competitions, losing to SC Hellas from Winnipeg, Manitoba. They were the champions of the 2012 Challenge Trophy defeating Edmonton Scottish in the finals. They again reached the finals in 2016 in a re-match with Edmonton Scottish, but finished in 2nd.

The women's team won the Jubilee Trophy as Canadian amateur champions in both 2016 and 2019.

In 2012, the club was approached about joining the new semi-professional league, Première ligue de soccer du Québec, however, for financial reasons, they chose not to join and the PLSQ project was carried out in a regional framework. However, the situation has since changed and the club intends to join the PLSQ. They originally intended to join in both the male and female division for the 2021 season, however, following the COVID-19 pandemic they decided to delay it until 2022, as many of their sponsors were hit hard financially due to the pandemic. However, they reversed their decision and joined the PLSQ for the 2021 season for both the male and female divisions, after obtaining its national license in December and securing new sponsorship opportunities. The women debuted on 27 June 2021 against AS Blainville in a 0–0 draw. The men debuted on 4 July 2021 against CS Longueuil finishing with a 1–1 draw. The men earned their first victory on 29 July 2021 defeating FC Laval by a score of 2–1.

== Seasons ==
Men

Season	League	Teams	Record	Rank	League Cup	Ref
2021	Première ligue de soccer du Québec	10 (Note: Ottawa South United withdrew from the 2021 league mid-way through due to government restrictions, with their matches removed from the standings. Thus, Beauport's draw against Ottawa is not included in their record.)	3–1–12	8th	–	
2022	Première ligue de soccer du Québec	12	7–5–10	8th	did not qualify	
2023	Ligue1 Québec	12	13–6–3	2nd	Semi-finals	
2024	Ligue1 Québec	11	6–9–5	5th	Quarter-finals	
2025	Ligue1 Québec	10	9–2–7	3rd	Quarter-finals	

Women

Season	League	Teams	Record	Rank	Playoffs	League Cup	Ref
2021	Première ligue de soccer du Québec	10	6–3–0	3rd	–	Semi-finals	
2022	Première ligue de soccer du Québec	12	2–1–8	11th	–	Did not qualify	
2023	Ligue1 Québec	12	4–3–4	6th	–	Quarter-finals	
2024	Ligue1 Québec	12	6–2–5	2nd, Group B (3rd overall)	Semi-finals	–	
2025	Ligue1 Québec	10	8–1–4	2nd, Group B (3rd overall)	Semi-finals	–	

== Honours ==
- Challenge Trophy

Champions: 2012
Runner-up: 2009, 2016

== Notable former players ==
The following players have either played at the professional or international level, either before or after playing for the PLSQ team:

Men

- (Canada) Kevin Cossette
- (Canada) Jonathan Vallée

Women

- (Canada) Daphnée Blouin
- (Canada) Mathilde Lachance
