= Celtix du Haut-Richelieu =

Semi-professional soccer club

- Full name: Club de Soccer Celtix du Haut-Richelieu
- Nickname: Celtix
- Founded: 1969
- Stadium: Stade Alphonse-Desjardins
- League: Ligue1 Québec
- 2025: L1Q, 7th (men); L1Q, 4th (women)
- Website: https://www.celtix.ca/fr/index.html
Home colours

Celtix du Haut-Richelieu is a Canadian semi-professional soccer club based in Saint-Jean-sur-Richelieu, Quebec that plays in Ligue1 Québec in the third tier of Canadian soccer, since 2020.

== History ==
The club was originally formed in 1969, with the name being inspired by Scottish club Glasgow Celtic. Prior to joining the PLSQ, the club played in the Ligue de Soccer Elite Quebec, which is the top amateur division in Quebec. They were accepted into the PLSQ in 2016 for the 2017 season, but did not end up joining the league at that time because of administrative reasons.

In 2020, the club joined the Première Ligue de soccer du Québec, a Division III league, fielding a team in the men's division. However, the COVID-19 pandemic forced the start of their debut season to be delayed, although the season did eventually return August 1. The club had planned an exchange program with three amateur clubs in France in the Burgundy and Paris regions, who would each send a player to Celtix on loan for the season, however, this idea was postponed due to the pandemic. They played their first match on August 1 against defending champions A.S. Blainville, losing 2–0. They finished in 3rd place in their debut season, which was ended prior to its conclusion due to new regulations from the Government of Quebec as a result of the second wave of the pandemic.

They will be entering a women's team in the female division of the PLSQ for the 2021 season.

== Seasons ==
Men

Season	League	Teams	Record	Rank	League Cup	Ref
2020 (Note: The 2020 season was cancelled before its conclusion, with the final standings determined on a points earned per game basis)	Première Ligue de soccer du Québec	6	4–0–4	3rd	–	
2021	Première Ligue de soccer du Québec	10 (Note: Ottawa South United withdrew from the 2021 league mid-way through due to government restrictions, with their matches removed from the standings. Thus, Celtix's victory against Ottawa is not included in their record.)	8–3–5	3rd	–	
2022	Première Ligue de soccer du Québec	12	3–7–12	10th	did not qualify	
2023	Ligue1 Québec	12	5–5–12	10th	Quarter-finals	
2024	Ligue1 Québec	11	5–6–9	10th	did not qualify	
2025	Ligue1 Québec	10	6–3–9	7th	Quarter-finals	

Women

Season	League	Teams	Record	Rank	Playoffs	League Cup	Ref
2021	Première Ligue de soccer du Québec	10	3–2–4	5th	–	did not qualify	
2022	Première Ligue de soccer du Québec	12	2–2–7	10th	–	did not qualify	
2023	Ligue1 Québec	12	1–6–4	10th	–	First round	
2024	Ligue1 Québec	12	8–2–6	3rd, Group B (6th overall)	did not qualify	–	
2025	Ligue1 Québec	10	8–1–4	3rd, Group B (4th overall)	did not qualify	–	

== Notable former players ==
The following players have either played at the professional or international level, either before or after playing for the PLSQ team:

- (Canada) Gabriel Balbinotti
- (Guinea) (Canada) Mamadi Camara
- (Canada) Vincent Lamy
- (Canada) Karl Ouimette
