= CS Montréal Centre =

Canadian semi-professional soccer club

- Full name: Club de Soccer Montréal Centre
- Founded: 2022
- League: Ligue2 Québec
- 2025: L2Q, 4th
- Website: https://csmontrealcentre.com/

Club de Soccer Montréal Centre is a Canadian semi-professional soccer club based in Montréal, Quebec, that plays in Ligue2 Québec.

== History ==
The club was formed in 2022 following a merger between AS Rosemont Petite Patrie and CS Boucaniers. In March 2023, they became a partner club of Major League Soccer club CF Montréal, joining their Scouting and Development Centre program.

In 2025, they entered a semi-pro team in the men's division in the new Ligue2 Québec, the second tier of the Ligue1 Québec system. On April 12, 2025, they drew 1–1 with CS LaSalle, in the first-ever match in the division. Through their first nine matches in the division, they recorded six wins, two draws, and one loss, which was the result of a forfeit due to an unregistered bench staffer, with the match originally ending in a draw.

== Year-by-year ==
Men

Season	League	Teams	Record	Rank	League Cup	Ref
2025	Ligue2 Québec	24	15–5–3	4th	–	
