= Revolution FC =

Semi-professional soccer club

- Full name: Revolution Football Club
- Founded: 1977; 49 years ago as FC Boisbriand; 2019; 7 years ago as Revolution FC
- League: Ligue2 Québec
- 2025: L2Q, 9th (men); L2Q, 5th (women)
- Website: https://www.revolutionfc.ca/

Revolution FC is a Canadian soccer club based in Saint-Eustache, Quebec that plays in Ligue2 Québec. At the end of 2018, four clubs (FC Boisbriand, FC St-Eustache, Shamrocks TC and Phénix de Saint-Joseph-du-Lac) merged to form the club.

FC Boisbriand previously played in the Première Ligue de soccer du Québec (later re-named Ligue1 Québec) from 2012 to 2013.

== History ==
=== FC Boisbriand ===
FC Boisbriand logo

The club was originally formed in 1977.

In 2012, the semi-professional club was established to play in the newly formed Première Ligue de soccer du Québec, a Division III league, as one of the founding members. Their home field was located at Parc Régional 640. They played their first match on May 6, at home, against FC L'Assomption. They had a rivalry with A.S. Blainville, with both clubs being from the Laurentides region. After the 2013 season, they withdrew from the league, having failed to meet league regulations.

=== Merger ===
At the end of 2019, the club merged with three other local clubs - FC St-Eustache, Shamrocks TC and Phénix de Saint-Joseph-du-Lac - to form Revolution FC. In January 2024, they partnered with Major League Soccer club CF Montréal, joining their Centre d'identification et perfectionnement (scouting and development centre). In 2025, they joined the semi-professional LS Pro (formerly the PLSQ), entering teams in the second tier Ligue2 Québec, in both the men's and women's divisions. In 2026, they won the Coupe du Quebec, defeating Ligue1 Québec side FC Laval in the final.

== Seasons ==
=== Men ===
as FC Boisbriand

Season	League	Teams	Record	Rank	League Cup	Ref
2012	Première Ligue de soccer du Québec	5	4–6–6	5th	–	
2013	Première Ligue de soccer du Québec	7	2–1–15	7th	Did not qualify	

as Revolution FC

Season	League	Teams	Record	Rank	League Cup	Ref
2025	Ligue2 Québec	24	14–4–5	5th	–	

Women

Season	League	Teams	Record	Rank	Playoffs	League Cup	Ref
2025	Ligue2 Québec	19	8–4–6	9th	–	–	

== Notable former players ==
The following players have either played at the professional or international level, either before or after playing for the PLSQ team:

- (Canada) António Ribeiro
