= CS Trident =

Canadian semi-professional soccer club

- Full name: Club de Soccer Trident
- Founded: 2021
- League: Ligue2 Québec
- 2025: L2Q, 10th (men); L2Q, 2nd (women)
- Website: https://www.cstrident.ca/

Club de Soccer Trident is a Canadian semi-professional soccer club based in Quebec City, Quebec, that plays in Ligue2 Québec.

== History ==
In 2021, the club was founded following the merger of AS Mistral Laurentien, CS L'Olympique CRSA and CS Caravelles de Sainte-Foy/Sillery.

In August 2023, they became a partner club of CF Montréal's Scouting and Development Centre, where they will work in tandem on development of Trident's players. In December 2023, they received the Canadian Soccer Association National Youth License.

In 2024, their senior women's team won the Jubilee Trophy as Canada's women's national amateur champions.

In 2025, they entered semi-professional teams in the men's and women's divisions of the new Ligue2 Québec.

== Year-by-year ==
Men

Season	League	Teams	Record	Rank	League Cup	Ref
2025	Ligue2 Québec	24	11–5–7	10th	–	

Women

Season	League	Teams	Record	Rank	Playoffs	League Cup	Ref
2025	Ligue2 Québec	19	15–2–1	2nd	–	–	
