= CS St-Hubert =

Canadian semi-professional soccer club

- Full name: Club de Soccer Spatial de St-Hubert
- Founded: 1980
- Stadium: Centre Sportif Roseanne-Laflamme
- League: Ligue1 Québec
- 2025: L1Q, 8th (men)
- Website: http://soccerst-hubert.com/
Home colours

Club de Soccer Spatial de St-Hubert is a Canadian semi-professional soccer club based in Saint-Hubert, Quebec, that plays in Ligue1 Québec.

== History ==

The club was originally formed in 1980. Prior to joining the PLSQ, the club played in the Ligue de Soccer Elite Quebec, which is the top amateur division in Quebec.

In 2017, the club joined the Première Ligue de soccer du Québec, a Division III league, fielding a team in the men's division. They played their first match on May 6 against CS Longueuil. They finished in sixth place out of seven teams in their inaugural season, but that did not dissuade coach François Bourgeais, who continued to play a young squad with an average age of under 21 the following season. In 2019, they had 14 different players score goals, which led the league in number of unique goalscorers.

In 2020, they had decided to add a team in the women's division of the Première Ligue de soccer du Québec. Cindy Walsh was announced as the team's head coach, making them the first club in the PLSQ with a female head coach. However, the 2020 season was postponed due to the COVID-19 pandemic. When the league restarted, the club decided to delay their female team's entry in the league and chose not to participate in the 2020 season, although their male team did enter.

== Seasons ==
Season	League	Teams	Record	Rank	League Cup	Ref
2017	Première Ligue de soccer du Québec	7	5–2–11	6th	Semi-finals	
2018	Première Ligue de soccer du Québec	8	6–4–11	6th	Semi-finals	
2019	Première Ligue de soccer du Québec	9	7–3–6	5th	Semi-finals	
2020 (Note: The 2020 season was cancelled before its conclusion, with the final standings determined on a points earned per game basis)	Première Ligue de soccer du Québec	6	3–1–4	4th	–	
2021	Première Ligue de soccer du Québec	10 (Note: Ottawa South United withdrew from the 2021 league mid-way through due to government restrictions, with their matches removed from the standings. St-Hubert had not yet played Ottawa, so no matches were removed from their record)	8–2–6	5th	–	
2022	Première Ligue de soccer du Québec	12	8–4–10	7th	did not qualify	
2023	Ligue1 Québec	12	8–6–8	6th	First Round	
2024	Ligue1 Québec	11	8–3–9	4th	Semi-finals	
2025	Ligue1 Québec	10	5–4–9	8th	Quarter-finals	

Women

Season	League	Teams	Record	Rank	Playoffs	League Cup	Ref
2021	Première Ligue de soccer du Québec	10	1–2–6	8th	–	did not qualify	
2022	Première Ligue de soccer du Québec	12	1–1–9	12th	–	did not qualify	
2023	Ligue1 Québec	12	1–1–9	12th	–	First Round	
2024	Ligue1 Québec	12	0–4–12	6th, Group A (12th overall)	did not qualify	–	
2025	Ligue1 Québec	11	removed from league				

== Notable former players ==
The following players have either played at the professional or international level, either before or after playing for the PLSQ team:

=== Men ===
- (Denmark) Ludwig Kodjo Amla
- (Haiti) Charles Auguste
- (Canada) Moïse Bombito
- (Guinea) Mamadi Camara
- (Canada) Joaquim Coulanges
- (Canada) Michel Djaozandry
- (Bulgaria) Karamfil Ilchev
- (Haiti) (Canada) Garven Metusala
- (Senegal) Babacar Ndiour
- (Canada) Zachary Roy
- (Canada) Samuel Salter
- (Mali) Aboubacar Sissoko
- (Ivory Coast) Yann Toualy

=== Women ===
- (Canada) Florence Belzile
- (Guyana) Stefanie Kouzas
- (Canada) Cindy Walsh
