= Urban agglomeration of Montreal =

Montreal Montréal
- Urban agglomeration
- Coordinates: 45°30′N 73°34′W
- Country: Canada
- Province: Quebec

Government
  - Mayor: Soraya Martinez Ferrada
  - President of Executive Committee: Nancy Blanchet

Area
  - Land: 498.29 km^{2} (192.39 sq mi)

Population (2021)
  - Total: 2,004,265
  - Density: 4,022.3/km^{2} (10,418/sq mi)
- Demonym: Montrealer/Montréalais(e)
- Time zone: UTC-5 (EST)
  - Summer (DST): UTC-4 (EDT)
- Postal code: H
- Area code: 514 and 438
- Website: Agglomeration council

The urban agglomeration of Montreal (French: agglomération de Montréal, pronounced [aɡlɔmeʁɑsjɔ̃ də mɔ̃ʁeal]) is an urban agglomeration in Quebec, Canada. Coextensive with the administrative region of Montreal, it is a territory equivalent to a regional county municipality (TE) and a census division (CD), for both of which its geographical code is 66. Prior to the merger of the municipalities in Region 06 in 2002, the administrative region was co-extensive with the Montreal Urban Community.

Located in the southern part of the province, the territory includes several of the islands of the Hochelaga Archipelago in the Saint Lawrence River, including the Island of Montreal, Nuns' Island (Île des Sœurs), Île Bizard, Saint Helen's Island (Île Sainte-Hélène), Île Notre-Dame, Dorval Island (Île Dorval), and several others. Only the first three of these islands are inhabited.

The region is the second-smallest in area (498.29 km^{2} (192.39 mi^{2})) and most populous (2,004,265 as of the 2021 Canadian Census) of Quebec's seventeen administrative regions.

== Government ==
The administrative region consists of the 2002–2005 territory of the city of Montreal. Following merger of the municipalities of the agglomeration on January 1, 2002, sixteen of its municipalities were reconstituted on January 1, 2006.

The urban agglomeration is governed by the Montreal Agglomeration Council (French: Conseil d'agglomération de Montréal), which is composed of:

- the Mayor of Montreal as the ex-officio leader
- 15 members from the Montreal City Council designated by the mayor,
- the 14 mayors of the reconstituted cities,
- a member of the Dollard-des-Ormeaux City Council designated by that city's mayor.

The executive of the council is the Montreal Executive Committee, which can be headed by the Mayor of Montreal or a councillor the mayor appoints. The weighting of votes for the council breaks down to 87% for the City of Montreal, and 13% for the other municipalities of the Island of Montreal.

=== Powers ===
The agglomeration council is granted responsibility over:

- Municipal assessment
- public transportation
- Arterial road planning
- Local water resource management
- Water supply
- Public safety, including law enforcement, firefighting & paramedic services.
- Municipal courts
- Economic development
- Public housing

And any other local responsibilities under the Municipal Powers Act. However, the city of Montreal is not obligated to execute these powers, and may delegate powers to local municipalities or other governing bodies.

Powers delegated to the Montreal Metropolitan Community (French: Communauté métropolitaine de Montréal, CMM), the regional government of Greater Montreal, by the urban agglomeration include public housing, economic development, and water supply and water treatment. Responsibility for public transit is shared with the agglomeration directly appointing members to the RTM, the regional transportation authority, and indirectly appointing members to the ARTM, the regional public transport planning authority, via the Montreal Metropolitan Community.

== Subdivisions ==
Map of the subdivisions of the urban agglomeration of Montreal.

Cities

- Baie-d'Urfé
- Beaconsfield
- Côte Saint-Luc
- Dollard-des-Ormeaux
- Dorval
- Hampstead
- Kirkland
- L'Île-Dorval
- Montreal
  - Borough of Ahuntsic-Cartierville
  - Borough of Anjou
  - Borough of Côte-des-Neiges–Notre-Dame-de-Grâce
  - Borough of L'Île-Bizard–Sainte-Geneviève
  - Borough of LaSalle
  - Borough of Lachine
  - Borough of Le Plateau-Mont-Royal
  - Borough of Le Sud-Ouest
  - Borough of Mercier–Hochelaga-Maisonneuve
  - Borough of Montréal-Nord
  - Borough of Outremont
  - Borough of Pierrefonds-Roxboro
  - Borough of Rivière-des-Prairies–Pointe-aux-Trembles
  - Borough of Rosemont–La Petite-Patrie
  - Borough of Saint-Laurent
  - Borough of Saint-Léonard
  - Borough of Verdun
  - Borough of Ville-Marie
  - Borough of Villeray–Saint-Michel–Parc-Extension
- Montréal-Est
- Montreal West (Montréal-Ouest in French)
- Mount Royal (Mont-Royal in French)
- Pointe-Claire
- Sainte-Anne-de-Bellevue
- Westmount

Village

- Senneville

== See also ==
- Greater Montreal
- List of regional county municipalities and equivalent territories in Quebec
