= Pierre Lamothe =

Canadian soccer player (born 1997)

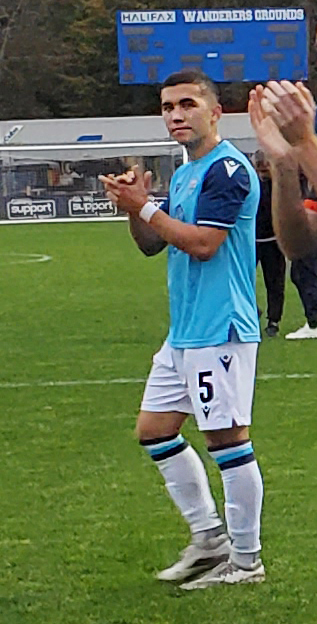
- Lamothe with HFX Wanderers in 2021

Personal information
- Date of birth: 18 September 1997 (age 29)
- Place of birth: Greenfield Park, Quebec, Canada
- Height: 1.73 m (5 ft 8 in)
- Position: Midfielder

Team information
- Current team: Bắc Ninh
- Number: 80

Youth career
- CS Longueuil
- 2011–2016: Montreal Impact

College career
| Years | Team | Apps | (Gls) |
| 2018–2019 | Montreal Carabins | | |

Senior career*
| Years | Team | Apps | (Gls) |
| 2016 | FC Montreal | 4 | (0) |
| 2017–2019 | CS Longueuil | 30 | (0) |
| 2020 | AS Blainville | 1 | (0) |
| 2021–2022 | HFX Wanderers | 45 | (3) |
| 2023–2024 | Pacific FC | 28 | (0) |
| 2023 | → Ho Chi Minh City (loan) | 0 | (0) |
| 2023–2024 | → Quảng Nam (loan) | 12 | (1) |
| 2025–2026 | Hà Nội | 12 | (0) |
| 2026 | → SHB Đà Nẵng (loan) | 4 | (0) |
| 2026– | Bắc Ninh | 0 | (0) |
- * Club domestic league appearances and goals as of June 7, 2026

Pierre Lamothe (born September 18, 1997) is a Canadian professional soccer player who plays as a midfielder for V.League 1 club Bắc Ninh.

== Early life ==
Pierre Lamothe was born in Greenfield Park, Quebec to a Canadian father and a Vietnamese mother from Huế. He began playing youth soccer at age four with local club CS Longueuil. In September 2011, he joined the Montreal Impact Academy, when it was founded. He played for Quebec provincial team at the U14 and U15 levels.

== University career ==
In 2018, he began attending the Université de Montréal, where he played for the men's soccer team. In December 2018, he received a scholarship from the Foundation for Athlete Excellence. He won the U Sports men's soccer championship in 2018, finishing as runner-ups in 2019. In the 2019 final of the national championship, he was named player of the game, in their loss to the UQTR Patriotes. In 2018, he was named RSEQ Rookie of the Year and was named to the All-Rookie Team, as well as being named to the U Sports national All-Rookie Team. He was named an RSEQ First Team All-Star in both 2018 and 2019. He was named to the U Sports All-Tournament Team in 2019.

== Club career ==
In July 2016, he joined the Impact's second team, FC Montreal in the USL, on an academy contract. After the season, he had a trial with the reserve side of French club FC Lorient.

In 2017, he returned to his former youth club CS Longueuil, joining the senior team in the Première ligue de soccer du Québec. In 2019, he was named team captain. During this time he also played club futsal with Longueuil and 2019 Canadian Futsal Championship finalists Sporting Montreal.

Ahead of the 2020 season, he sought to sign with a Canadian Premier League club, however, he ultimately joined fellow PLSQ side AS Blainville. He made only one appearance that season, which was cut short due to the COVID-19 pandemic, as he suffered an injury.

In January 2021, he joined HFX Wanderers FC in the Canadian Premier League on a one-year contract, with a club option for 2022. Lamothe scored his first goal for the Wanderers on July 24, 2021 against Valour FC, netting the only goal in a 1-0 victory. In January 2022, HFX announced they had exercised Lamothe's contract option, keeping him with the side through the 2022 season. In August 2022, he scored two goals in back-to-back games, including a highlight reel goal on August 20 to give the Wanderers a 1-0 victory over Pacific FC. After two seasons with the team, he departed the club after the 2022 season. Over his two seasons with the club, he scored three goals and added two assists in 48 appearances, across all competitions.

In November 2022, he signed a contract with Pacific FC for the 2023 season. In January 2023, he trained with Vietnamese V.League 1 club SHB Da Nang, playing in the 2023 Thien Long Cup Friendly Tournament. In September 2023, he was loaned to Vietnamese club Ho Chi Minh City of the V.League 1 until March 2024. However, Lamothe was released by Ho Chi Minh City before the season, as they filled their foreign player and Vietnamese origin player spots and had no remaining roster space. On October 6, 2023, Lamothe joined fellow V.League 1 club Quảng Nam. He then returned to Pacific for the 2024 season, after which he departed the club at the end of the season.

In January 2025, he returned to Vietnam and signed with V.League 1 club Hanoi FC on a two-year contract. In December 2025, it was announced that he would join SHB Đà Nẵng in the same division on loan for the remainder of the season, beginning in January.

In August 2026, Lamothe was transferred to the newly promoted V.League 1 side Bac Ninh.

== International career ==
In September 2015, Lamothe participated in a development camp for the Canadian U20 team led by Rob Gale.

In 2017, he was named to the Quebec U20 team for the 2017 Jeux de la Francophonie.

== Career statistics ==
As of October 25, 2024

Club statistics
| Club | Season | League | | | Playoffs | | National Cup | | League Cup | | Total | |
| Club | Season | Division | Apps | Goals | Apps | Goals | Apps | Goals | Apps | Goals | Apps | Goals |
|---|---|---|---|---|---|---|---|---|---|---|---|---|
| FC Montreal | 2016 | United Soccer League | 4 | 0 | — | | — | | — | | 4 | 0 |
| CS Longueuil | 2017 | Première Ligue de soccer du Québec | 10 | 0 | — | | — | | 1 | 0 | 11 | 0 |
| CS Longueuil | 2018 | Première Ligue de soccer du Québec | 11 | 0 | — | | — | | 0 | 0 | 11 | 0 |
| CS Longueuil | 2019 | Première Ligue de soccer du Québec | 9 | 0 | — | | — | | 0 | 0 | 9 | 0 |
| CS Longueuil | Total | | 30 | 0 | 0 | 0 | 0 | 0 | 1 | 0 | 31 | 0 |
| AS Blainville | 2020 | Première Ligue de soccer du Québec | 1 | 0 | — | | — | | — | | 1 | 0 |
| HFX Wanderers | 2021 | Canadian Premier League | 24 | 1 | — | | 2 | 0 | — | | 26 | 1 |
| HFX Wanderers | 2022 | Canadian Premier League | 21 | 2 | — | | 1 | 0 | — | | 22 | 2 |
| HFX Wanderers | Total | | 45 | 3 | 0 | 0 | 3 | 0 | 0 | 0 | 48 | 3 |
| Pacific FC | 2023 | Canadian Premier League | 6 | 0 | 0 | 0 | 1 | 0 | — | | 7 | 0 |
| Pacific FC | 2024 | Canadian Premier League | 22 | 0 | 0 | 0 | 3 | 0 | — | | 25 | 0 |
| Pacific FC | Total | | 28 | 0 | 0 | 0 | 4 | 0 | 0 | 0 | 32 | 0 |
| Quảng Nam (loan) | 2023–24 | V.League 1 | 12 | 1 | — | | 0 | 0 | — | | 12 | 1 |
| Career total | | | 120 | 4 | 0 | 0 | 7 | 0 | 1 | 0 | 128 | 4 |
