= Emad Houache =

Canadian soccer player (born 1994)

Personal information
- Date of birth: September 4, 1994 (age 32)
- Place of birth: Abu Dhabi, United Arab Emirates
- Height: 1.63 m (5 ft 4 in)
- Position: Midfielder

Team information
- Current team: Ottawa South United
- Number: 30

Youth career
- Ottawa Royals SC
- Ottawa Fury
- AS Hull
- Montreal Impact

College career
Years	Team	Apps	(Gls)
2017–2021	Carleton Ravens	49	(9)

Senior career*
Years	Team	Apps	(Gls)
2014	Montreal Impact U23	10	(0)
2015	FC Montreal	2	(0)
2015	Ottawa Fury FC Academy	10	(2)
2015	Ottawa Fury FC	0	(0)
2016	Kitsap Pumas	4	(0)
2017–2018	FC Gatineau	12	(0)
2020	Ottawa South United	5	(0)
2024–	Ottawa South United	26	(1)
- * Club domestic league appearances and goals as of September 8, 2025

Emad Houache (born September 4, 1994) is a soccer player who plays for Ottawa South United in Ligue1 Québec.

== Early life ==
Born in Abu Dhabi, United Arab Emirates, Houache is of Algerian descent, and grew up in Ghardaïa, Algeria, before moving to Ottawa, Canada with his family when he was ten years old. In Ottawa, he began playing youth soccer with Ottawa Royals SC, before joining the Ottawa Fury Academy. Afterwards, he played with SPA for a year and a half, before joining AS Hull. After being invited to trial with the Montreal Impact Academy, he joined their U18 team in January 2012.

== University career ==
In 2017, Houache began attending Carleton University, where he played for the men's soccer team. In 2020, he began serving as team captain. In 2018, he was named an OUA East Division First Team All-Star. In 2019, he won the OUA title with Carleton, scoring in the championship final. At the national tournament, they were defeated in the semi-finals by the eventual champions UQTR Patriotes. In 2021, he served as team captain.

== Club career ==
In 2014, he played with the Montreal Impact U23 in the Premier Development League.

In March 2015, he joined USL club FC Montreal, the second team of the Montreal Impact, on a professional contract. In July 2015, he was released by the club.

After being released by FC Montreal, Houache joined the Ottawa Fury FC Academy in the Première ligue de soccer du Québec. In October 2015, he signed with the Ottawa Fury FC first team in the North American Soccer League.

In 2016, he played with Premier Development League club Kitsap Pumas.

In 2017, he joined FC Gatineau of the Première ligue de soccer du Québec and was named to the PLSQ All-Star team in 2018.

In 2020 he played with Ottawa South United.

== Career statistics ==
As of match played on September 8, 2025

Club	Season	League			Playoffs		Domestic Cup		League Cup		Total	
Club	Season	Division	Apps	Goals	Apps	Goals	Apps	Goals	Apps	Goals	Apps	Goals
Montreal Impact U23	2014	Premier Development League	10	0	—		—		—		10	0
FC Montreal	2015	USL	2	0	—		—		—		2	0
Ottawa Fury Academy	2015	Première Ligue de soccer du Québec	10	2	—		—		0	0	10	2
Ottawa Fury FC	2015	North American Soccer League	0	0	0	0	0	0	—		0	0
Kitsap Pumas	2016	Premier Development League	4	0	—		0	0	—		4	0
FC Gatineau	2017	Première Ligue de soccer du Québec	1	0	—		—		2	1	3	1
FC Gatineau	2018	Première Ligue de soccer du Québec	11	0	—		—		0	0	11	0
FC Gatineau	Total		12	0	0	0	0	0	2	1	14	1
Ottawa South United	2020	Première Ligue de soccer du Québec	5	0	—		—		—		5	0
Ottawa South United	2024	Ligue1 Québec	15	0	—		—		—		15	0
Ottawa South United	2025	Ligue1 Québec	11	1	—		—		—		11	1
Ottawa South United	Total		31	1	0	0	0	0	0	0	31	1
Career total			69	3	0	0	0	0	2	1	71	4
