= 2017 Première ligue de soccer du Québec season =

Première ligue de soccer du Québec
- Season: 2017
- Champions: AS Blainville
- Cup champions: AS Blainville
- Matches: 63
- Goals: 203 (3.22 per match)
- Top goalscorer: Pierre-Rudolph Mayard (14 goals) (AS Blainville)
- Biggest home win: 5 goals: Blainville 5–0 Gatineau (2 September)
- Biggest away win: 8 goals: St-Hubert 1–9 Blainville (20 May)
- Highest scoring: 10 goals: St-Hubert 1–9 Blainville (20 May)

The 2017 Première ligue de soccer du Québec season is the sixth season of play for the Première ligue de soccer du Québec, a Division 3 semi-professional soccer league in the Canadian soccer pyramid and the highest level of soccer based in the Canadian province of Québec.

CS Mont-Royal Outremont was the defending champion from 2016.

AS Blainville won the league championship this season.

== Changes from 2016 ==
For the third season running, the league will feature a total of seven teams. Dynamo de Québec & CS St-Hubert will begin their first season in the league, while Lakeshore SC & Ottawa Fury FC Academy departed after the 2016 season.

Starting this year, the league champion was granted a place in the next year's Canadian Championship. As a result, the Inter-Provincial Cup was discontinued.

== Teams ==
The following seven teams will take part in the 2017 season:

Team	City	Stadium	Founded	Joined	Head coach
Current teams
AS Blainville	Blainville, Laurentides	Blainville Park	1986	2012	(France) Emmanuel Macagno
Dynamo de Quebec	Quebec City, Capitale-Nationale	ESLE	1991	2017	(France) Edmond Foyé
FC Gatineau	Gatineau, Outaouais	Mont-Bleu Field	2012	2013	(France) Sylver Castagnet
FC Lanaudière	Terrebonne, Lanaudière	Terrebonne Sports Complex	2016	2016	(Canada) Andrew Olivieri
CS Longueuil	Longueuil, Montérégie	Laurier Park	1970	2014	(France) Anthony Rimasson
CS Mont-Royal Outremont	Mount Royal, Montréal	TMR Recreation Centre	?	2013	(Canada) Luc Brutus
CS St-Hubert	Saint-Hubert, Montérégie	Rosanne-Laflamme	1980	2017	(France) François Bourgeais

Locations of teams for the 2017 PLSQ season.

== Standings ==
Each team played 18 matches as part of the season; three against every other team in the league. There are no playoffs; the first-place team is crowned as league champion at the end of the season and qualifies for the 2018 Canadian Championship.

Pos	Team	Pld	W	D	L	GF	GA	GD	Pts	Qualification
1	AS Blainville (C, Q)	18	13	2	3	45	14	+31	41	2018 Canadian Championship
2	Dynamo de Québec	18	9	4	5	28	25	+3	31	
3	CS Longueuil	18	6	9	3	30	24	+6	27	
4	CS Mont-Royal Outremont	18	6	6	6	30	29	+1	24	
5	FC Lanaudière	18	4	7	7	32	33	−1	19	
6	CS St-Hubert	18	5	2	11	23	44	−21	17	
7	FC Gatineau	18	3	4	11	15	34	−19	13	

Updated to match(es) played on October 22, 2017. Source: TSI Sports
(C) Champions; (Q) Qualified for the phase indicated

== Statistics ==
=== Top goalscorers ===
Rank	Player	Club	Goals
1	(Canada) Pierre-Rudolph Mayard	AS Blainville	14
2	(Canada) Berlin Jean-Gilles	FC Lanaudière	13
3	(Republic of the Congo) Dex Kaniki	CS Longueuil	11
3	(Canada) Frederico Moojen	CS Mont-Royal Outremont	11
5	(Morocco) Rida Aboulhamid	AS Blainville	9
6	(Canada) Mitchell Syla	FC Lanaudière	8
7	(Canada) Charles-David Martel	CS St-Hubert	7
8	(Canada) Nicolas Bertrand	AS Blainville	6
9	(Four players tied)		5

Updated to matches played on 22 October 2017. Source:

=== Top goalkeepers ===
Rank	Player	Club	Minutes	GAA
1	(Canada) Jean-Lou Gosselin	AS Blainville	450	0.60
2	(Republic of the Congo) Erwann Ofouya	AS Blainville	1170	0.69
3	(France) Nizar Houhou	CS Mont-Royal Outremont	720	0.75
4	(France) Valentin Lamoulie	CS Longueuil	709	0.76
5	(Canada) Mario Gerges	Dynamo de Québec	1215	0.96
6	(Haiti) Gabard Fénélon	FC Lanaudière	1440	1.31
7	(Cameroon) Horace Sobze Zemo	FC Gatineau	1260	1.57
8	(Canada) Francis Monongo	CS Longueuil	731	1.60
9	(Canada) Khalid Ismail	CS Mont-Royal Outremont	900	2.10
10	(Canada) Nicolas Milli	CS St-Hubert	1035	2.61

Updated to matches played on October 22, 2017. Minimum 450 minutes played. Source:

=== Awards ===
Award	Player (club)	Ref
Ballon d'or (Best Player)	Pierre-Rudolph Mayard (AS Blainville)	
Ballon d'argent (2nd Best Player)	Frederico Moojen (CS Mont-Royal Outremont)	
Ballon de bronze (3rd Best Player)	Berlin Jean-Gilles (FC Lanaudière)	
Golden Boot (Top Scorer)	Pierre-Rudolph Mayard (AS Blainville)	
Coach of the Year	Emmanuel Macagno (AS Blainville)	

== Cup ==
The cup tournament is a separate contest from the rest of the season, in which all seven teams from the league take part, and is unrelated to the season standings. It is not a form of playoffs at the end of the season (as is typically seen in North American sports), but is a competition running in parallel to the regular season (similar to the Canadian Championship or the FA Cup), albeit only for PLSQ teams. All matches are separate from the regular season, and are not reflected in the season standings.

The 2017 PLSQ Cup maintained the same format as the previous seasons, as a two-game aggregate knockout tournament with a single match final. As defending champion, AS Blainville were granted a bye for the first round.

First round
CS Longueuil	1	3	4
FC Lanaudière	1	0	1
CS Mont-Royal Outremont	1	0	1
FC Gatineau	1	1	2
Dynamo de Québec	1	2	3
CS St-Hubert (a)	1	2	3

Semifinals
AS Blainville (a)	1	0	1
CS Longueuil	1	0	1
FC Gatineau	3	1	4
CS St-Hubert	1	2	3

Final
AS Blainville	1
FC Gatineau	0

=== First round ===
July 15, 2017	FC Lanaudière	1 – 1	CS Longueuil	Terrebonne
3:00 pm	Syla 65'	Report	Bona 37'	Stadium: Multisports Terrebonne

July 22, 2017	CS Longueuil	3 – 0 (4 – 1 agg.)	FC Lanaudière	Longueuil
7:30 pm	Davies 13'; Oliveri 45', 68'	Report		Stadium: Laurier 1

July 16, 2017	FC Gatineau	1 – 1	CS Mont-Royal Outremont	Gatineau
5:00 pm	Dagnogo	Report	Rosa	Stadium: Mont-Bleu 4

July 23, 2017	CS Mont-Royal Outremont	0 – 1 (1 – 2 agg.)	FC Gatineau	Montreal
6:30 pm		Report	Gauthier-Lafrenière 15'	Stadium: TMR REC3

July 15, 2017	CS St-Hubert	1 – 1	Dynamo de Québec	Longueuil
5:00 pm	Martel 64'	Report	Cossette 29'	Stadium: Rosanne-Laflamme

July 22, 2017	Dynamo de Québec	2 – 2 (3 – 3 agg.)	CS St-Hubert (a)	Lévis
4:00 pm	Grant-Gignac 69' (o.g.); St-Maurice 89'; Aussems 90+3'	Report	Adiem 2'	Stadium: ESLE

=== Semifinals ===
July 29, 2017	CS Longueuil	1 – 1	AS Blainville	Longueuil
8:30 pm	Mira 47'	Report	Aboulhamid 2'	Stadium: Laurier 1

September 9, 2017	AS Blainville (a)	0 – 0 (1 – 1 agg.)	CS Longueuil	Blainville
6:00 pm				Stadium: Parc Blainville 1

July 29, 2017	CS St-Hubert	1 – 3	FC Gatineau	Longueuil
5:00 pm	Mersel 71'	Report	Lamontagne 48'; Karajovanovic 63'; Houache 82'	Stadium: Rosanne-Laflamme

September 9, 2017	FC Gatineau	1 – 2 (4 – 3 agg.)	CS St-Hubert	Gatineau
5:00 pm				Stadium: Mont-Bleu

=== Final ===
October 28, 2017	AS Blainville	1 – 0	FC Gatineau	Terrebonne
6:30 pm	Mayard 28'			Stadium: Multisports Terrebonne

== Reserve Division ==
The league operated a reserve division.

Pos	Team	Pld	W	D	L	GF	GA	GD	Pts
1	Dynamo de Quebec Reserves	12	8	2	2	27	13	+14	26
2	CS Longueuil Reserves	12	7	2	3	27	18	+9	23
3	CS Mont-Royal Outremont Reserves	12	6	3	3	26	17	+9	21
4	AS Blainville Reserves	12	6	2	4	27	13	+14	20
5	CS St-Hubert Reserves	12	3	5	4	27	33	−6	14
6	FC Lanaudière Reserves	12	2	1	9	17	39	−22	7
7	FC Gatineau Reserves	12	1	3	8	16	34	−18	6

Source: TSI Sports

=== Awards ===
Award	Player (club)	Ref
Ballon d'or (Best Player)	Laurent Palacio Tellier (CS Longueuil Reserves)	
Ballon d'argent (2nd Best Player)	Nacereddine Zenaini (FC Lanaudière Reserves)	
Ballon de bronze (3rd Best Player)	Wassim Chaouki (Dynamo de Québec Reserves)	
Golden Boot (Top Scorer)	Ekoe Wobuibe Dekpo (CS Longueuil Reserves)	
