= Garven Metusala =

Haitian footballer (born 1999)

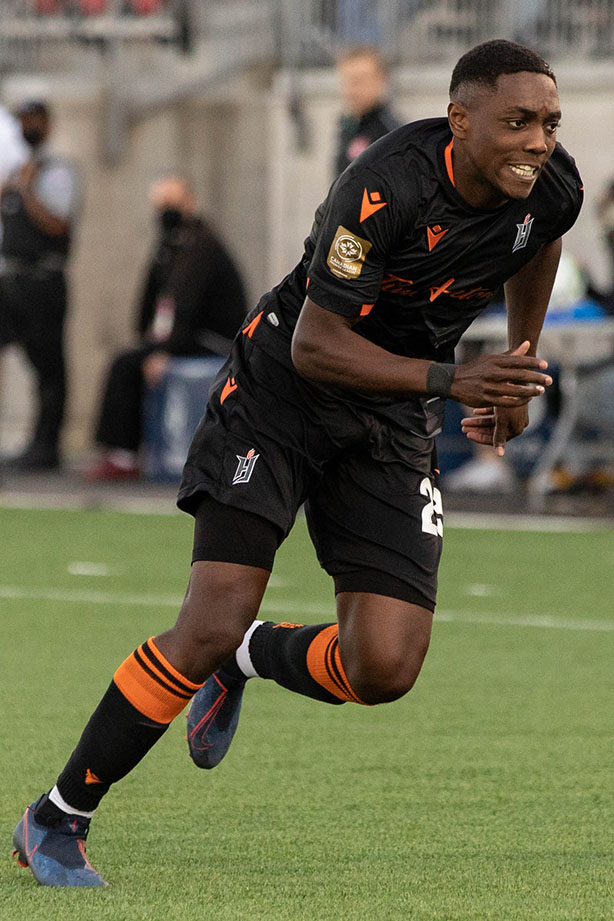
- Metusala playing for Forge FC in 2021

Personal information
- Full name: Garven-Michée Metusala
- Date of birth: 31 December 1999 (age 26)
- Place of birth: Terrebonne, Quebec, Canada
- Height: 1.85 m (6 ft 1 in)
- Positions: Centre-back; midfielder

Team information
- Current team: Colorado Springs Switchbacks
- Number: 23

Youth career
- Étoiles de L'Est
- 2013–2016: Montreal Impact
- 2017: Étoiles de L'Est

College career
Years	Team	Apps	(Gls)
2017–2018	Dawson Blues		
2020	Concordia Stingers	0	(0)

Senior career*
Years	Team	Apps	(Gls)
2018	CS St-Hubert	18	(0)
2019–2020	CS Fabrose	12	(0)
2020	AS Blainville	4	(0)
2021–2024	Forge FC	84	(2)
2025–	Colorado Springs Switchbacks	40	(2)

International career^{‡}
2022–	Haiti	17	(1)
- * Club domestic league appearances and goals as of October 31, 2026 ‡ National team caps and goals as of October 8, 2026

Garven-Michée Metusala (born 31 December 1999) is a professional footballer who plays as a centre-back for USL Championship club Colorado Springs Switchbacks. Born in Canada, he plays for the Haiti national team.

== Early life ==
Born in Terrebonne, Canada, to a Haitian mother and a Congolese father, Metusala began his youth career with Étoiles de L'Est. In 2013, he joined the Montreal Impact Academy, playing there until 2016. Afterwards, he returned to Étoiles de L'Est, where he also played at the senior amateur level with the club in the Ligue de soccer élite du Québec.

Metusala was an assistant captain with Team Quebec at the 2017 Canada Summer Games, where he won the bronze medal.

== College career ==
Metusala spent two years with Dawson College playing for the soccer team, winning the RSEQ bronze medal in 2017.

In 2019, Metusala committed to play for Concordia University. However, he ultimately never appeared for Concordia in a U Sports match, as the 2020 season was cancelled due to the COVID-19 pandemic, although he did participate in the indoor season.

== Club career ==
In 2018, Metusala played for PLSQ side CS St-Hubert. In 2019, he joined fellow PLSQ side CS Fabrose. He won the league cup with Fabrose in 2019. In 2020, after making a single appearance for Fabrose, he joined A.S. Blainville during the COVID-19 pandemic-shortened season, winning the league title.

At the 2021 CPL–U Sports Draft, Metusala was selected in the first round (8th overall) by Forge FC. On 23 June 2021, he signed his first professional contract with the club. On 27 June, Metusala made his debut, as a substitute, in a 2–0 loss to Valour FC. He started his first match on 4 July against Pacific FC. He scored his first goal on 9 August 2021 against Atlético Ottawa. He helped Forge advance to the Championship match in 2021, in which he started, but they were defeated by Pacific FC. In 2022, he won the CPL title with Forge. In October 2023, he helped the club win their fourth league title, following a 2–1 win over Cavalry FC in the play-off final. On July 27, 2024, he made his 100th appearance for the club. He departed the club after the 2024 season.

In January 2025, Metusala joined USL Championship side Colorado Springs Switchbacks.

== International career ==
In August 2021, Metusala was first contacted by the Haitian Football Federation about representing Haiti internationally, being eligible through his mother's origins. In March 2022, he received his first call-up by the Haiti senior national team for a friendly match against Guatemala. He made his international debut on March 28, starting the aforementioned game and playing 85 minutes in a 2–1 loss.

In June 2023, Metusala was named to Haiti's final squad for the 2023 CONCACAF Gold Cup: he featured in every minute, as Les Grenadiers eventually got eliminated after the group stage. On 11 June 2026, Metusala was called up to Haiti's squad for the 2026 FIFA World Cup, replacing the injured Leverton Pierre.

== Career statistics ==
=== Club ===
As of match played 25 October 2025

Appearances and goals by club, season and competition
Club	Season	League			Playoffs		National cup		League cup		Continental		Total	
Club	Season	Division	Apps	Goals	Apps	Goals	Apps	Goals	Apps	Goals	Apps	Goals	Apps	Goals
CS St-Hubert	2018	Première Ligue de soccer du Québec	18	0	—		—		0	0	—		18	0
CS Fabrose	2019	Première Ligue de soccer du Québec	11	0	—		—		3	0	—		14	0
CS Fabrose	2020	Première Ligue de soccer du Québec	1	0	—		—		—		—		1	0
CS Fabrose	Total		12	0	—		—		3	0	—		15	0
AS Blainville	2020	Première Ligue de soccer du Québec	4	0	—		—		—		—		4	0
Forge FC	2021	Canadian Premier League	23	2	2	0	1	0	—		6 (Note: Appearances in the CONCACAF League)	0	32	2
Forge FC	2022	Canadian Premier League	22	0	3	0	2	0	—		2 (Note: Appearances in the CONCACAF Champions League)	0	29	0
Forge FC	2023	Canadian Premier League	17	0	2	0	2	0	—		—		21	0
Forge FC	2024	Canadian Premier League	22	0	1	0	5	0	—		2	0	30	0
Forge FC	Total		84	2	8	0	10	0	—		10	0	112	2
Colorado Springs Switchbacks	2025	USL Championship	23	0	—		—		—		2	0	25	0
Career total			141	2	8	0	10	0	3	0	12	0	174	2

=== International ===
As of match played 13 October 2025

Appearances and goals by national team and year
National team	Year	Apps	Goals
Haiti	2022	1	0
Haiti	2023	7	0
Haiti	2024	4	0
Haiti	2025	4	0
Total		16	0

Scores and results list Haiti's goal tally first, score column indicates score after each Metusala goal.

List of international goals scored by Garven Metusala
No.	Date	Venue	Opponent	Score	Result	Competition
1	24 September 2026	Sabina Park, Kingston, Jamaica	Trinidad and Tobago	2–2	3–2	2026–27 CONCACAF Nations League A
