= Jason Beaulieu =

Canadian soccer player (born 1994)

Personal information
- Full name: Jason Beaulieu
- Date of birth: 12 February 1994 (age 32)
- Place of birth: Montreal, Quebec, Canada
- Height: 1.93 m (6 ft 4 in)
- Position: Goalkeeper

Youth career
- FC Boisbriand
- 2011–2013: Montreal Impact

College career
Years	Team	Apps	(Gls)
2014–2017	New Mexico Lobos	69	(0)

Senior career*
Years	Team	Apps	(Gls)
2014	ACP Montréal-Nord	4	(0)
2015	Mont-Royal Outremont	1	(0)
2017	Albuquerque Sol FC	4	(0)
2018–2019	Montreal Impact	0	(0)
2019	→ Ottawa Fury (loan)	0	(0)
2020	HFX Wanderers	4	(0)
Total		13	(0)
- * Club domestic league appearances and goals

Jason Beaulieu (born 12 February 1994) is a Canadian former professional soccer player who played as a goalkeeper.

== Early life ==
Beaulieu was born in Montreal, Quebec, and grew up in the off-island suburb of Boisbriand. He played youth soccer for FC Boisbriand until 2011 when he joined the Montreal Impact Academy. In 2011, he played with Montreal's senior academy team in the Canadian Soccer League's first division. In his debut season, he helped Montreal secure a playoff berth where they were eliminated in the first round by Capital City.

He re-signed with the academy team the following season. Beaulieu would receive the starting goalkeeper position as teammate Maxime Crépeau missed the majority of the season due to an injury. He would assist the club in securing another playoff berth by finishing second in the division. Their opponents in the preliminary round of the postseason were Toronto FC's academy where Montreal successfully advanced to the next round. In the next round, Montreal defeated the York Region Shooters to secure a spot in the championship final. Beaulieu would appear in the championship final match where the Impact was defeated by Toronto Croatia. Throughout the 2012 campaign, he recorded 11 clean sheets and was named the club's MVP and Defensive Player of the Year. He was also nominated for the league's top goalkeeper award.

== Club career ==
=== Early career ===
In 2014, Beaulieu played for Première Ligue de soccer du Québec side ACP Montréal-Nord, making four appearances. In the fall of that year, he began attending the University of New Mexico, where he made a total of 69 appearances in NCAA Division I over the following four years.

In 2015, Beaulieu played for PLSQ side CS Mont-Royal Outremont, making one appearance. In the summer of 2017, he played for USL PDL side Albuquerque Sol FC, making four appearances that season.

=== Montreal Impact ===
On 9 January 2018, Beaulieu returned to Montreal Impact, then playing in Major League Soccer. Ahead of the 2019 season, Beaulieu was slated to go on loan to USL Championship side Ottawa Fury but suffered a knee injury requiring surgery in January 2019. After missing six months while recovering from surgery, he was finally loaned to Ottawa Fury on 18 July 2019.

Beaulieu's contract option was declined by the Impact at the end of the 2019 season.

=== HFX Wanderers ===
On 5 February 2020, Beaulieu signed with Canadian Premier League side HFX Wanderers. He made his debut for HFX on August 15 against Pacific FC. On 3 November 2020, the club announced that Beaulieu had retired in order to pursue a career in engineering.

== Career statistics ==
As of 3 November 2020

Club statistics
Club	Season	League			National Cup		Other		Total	
Club	Season	Division	Apps	Goals	Apps	Goals	Apps	Goals	Apps	Goals
ACP Montréal-Nord	2014	PLSQ	4	0	—		0	0	4	0
Mont-Royal Outremont	2015	PLSQ	1	0	—		0	0	1	0
Albuquerque Sol FC	2017	USL PDL	4	0	—		0	0	4	0
HFX Wanderers	2020	Canadian Premier League	4	0	0	0	0	0	4	0
Career total			13	0	0	0	0	0	13	0

== Honours ==
HFX Wanderers

- Canadian Premier League Runners-up: 2020

Montreal Impact Academy

- CSL Championship Runners-up: 2012
