= Gabriel Balbinotti =

Canadian soccer player (born 1998)

Personal information
- Full name: Gabriel Wiethaeuper-Balbinotti
- Date of birth: April 12, 1998 (age 28)
- Place of birth: Montreal, Quebec, Canada
- Height: 1.85 m (6 ft 1 in)
- Position: Forward

Team information
- Current team: CS Longueuil

Youth career
- Hudson Saint-Lazare
- 2012–2018: Montreal Impact

College career
Years	Team	Apps	(Gls)
2019	UQTR Patriotes		

Senior career*
Years	Team	Apps	(Gls)
2018	Ottawa Fury FC	2	(0)
2019	FC Lanaudière	10	(6)
2020	Forge FC	6	(0)
2021	FC Lanaudière	5	(3)
2022	Celtix du Haut-Richelieu	8	(4)
2023	AS Blainville	13	(1)
2024	Celtix du Haut-Richelieu	11	(5)
2025	CS Trois-Rivières	10	(9)
2026–	CS Longueuil	3	(3)
- * Club domestic league appearances and goals as of April 20, 2026

Gabriel Wiethaeuper-Balbinotti (born April 12, 1998) is a Canadian professional soccer player who plays for CS Longueuil in Ligue1 Quebec.

== Early life ==
Born in Montreal, Quebec to Brazilian parents, Balbinotti spent the early years of his childhood in Porto Alegre, Brazil, where he attended Pan American School. He moved to Kirkland, Quebec when he was eight years old and played for the Hudson Saint-Lazare soccer club. He then moved to Trois-Rivières, Quebec four years later. He settled in Montreal to join the Montreal Impact Academy in 2012.

== College career ==
In 2019, he began attending the Université du Québec à Trois-Rivières, playing for the UQTR Patriotes men's soccer team. In 2019, he helped them to win the U Sports men's soccer championship, scoring three goals during the final tournament.

== Club career ==
Balbinotti progressed through the youth ranks of MLS club Montreal Impact. At the 2014 MLS All-Star Game, he played for the youth all-star team against the Bayern Munich U16s. In 2015, he joined the Under-18 squad competing in the U.S. Soccer Development Academy. He scored three goals in 21 games in his debut season, before adding 23 goals in as many games during the 2016–17 campaign.

On February 28, 2018, Balbinotti joined USL side Ottawa Fury. After the 2018 season, the Fury would announce that Balbinotti would not return to the Fury for the 2019 season.

In May 2019, Balbinotti joined PLSQ team FC Lanaudière. In his first season in the PLSQ, he scored six goals in 10 appearances.

In December 2019, Balbinotti was drafted seventh overall in the 2019 CPL–U Sports Draft by Forge FC. On July 31, 2020 he signed a deal with Forge FC.

He returned to the PLSQ and FC Lanaudière in 2021. For the 2022 season, he signed with Celtix du Haut-Richelieu.

In 2025, he played with Trois-Rivières in Ligue2 Québec. He scored a hat trick on April 19, 2025 against AS Chaudiere-Ouest.

== International career ==
In 2013, Balbinotti was called up to two camps with the Canadian U-15 national team. He was named to the U15 national team for the 2013 Copa de México de Naciones. In January 2018, he was called up to the Canadian U-23 national team camp in the United States for the first time.

In 2017, he was called up to a Quebec-Canada U20 team to play friendlies against Haiti U20, who were preparing for the 2017 Jeux de la Francophonie.

== Career statistics ==
As of September 25, 2025

Club	League	Season	League		Playoffs		Domestic Cup		League Cup		Continental		Total	
Club	League	Season	Apps	Goals	Apps	Goals	Apps	Goals	Apps	Goals	Apps	Goals	Apps	Goals
Ottawa Fury FC	USL	2018	2	0	0	0	0	0	—		—		2	0
FC Lanaudière	PLSQ	2019	10	6	—		—		2	0	—		12	6
Forge FC	Canadian Premier League	2020	6	0	0	0	0	0	—		0	0	6	0
FC Lanaudière	PLSQ	2021	5	3	—		—		—		—		5	3
Celtix du Haut-Richelieu	PLSQ	2022	8	4	—		—		—		—		8	4
AS Blainville	Ligue1 Québec	2023	13	1	—		—		0	0	—		13	1
Celtix du Haut-Richelieu	Ligue1 Québec	2024	11	5	—		—		0	0	—		11	5
CS Trois-Rivières	Ligue2 Québec	2025	10	9	—		—		—		—		10	9
Career total			65	28	0	0	0	0	2	0	0	0	67	28
