= ACP Montréal-Nord =

Semi-professional soccer club

- Full name: Académie Canadienne Prospective Montréal-Nord
- Founded: 2014
- Head Coach: Harry Makdessian
- League: Première Ligue de soccer du Québec
- 2014: PLSQ, 6th
- Website: http://www.acpmontrealnord.com

ACP Montréal-Nord was a Canadian semi-professional soccer club based in Montréal-Nord, Montreal, Quebec that played in the Première Ligue de soccer du Québec.

== History ==
The club was formed in 2014 as a joint venture between the Académie Canadienne Prospective and the Club de Soccer de Montréal-Nord. It runs a successful youth academy.

In 2014, the semi-professional club was established to play in the newly formed Première Ligue de soccer du Québec, a Division III league, with Harry Makdessian serving as head coach. Their home field was located at Parc St Laurent. The team was mostly made up of players who came over from the FC St-Léonard team that folded after the 2013 season. They played their first match on May 2, against FC Gatineau. They finished in last place in the 2014, after being deducted two points for forfeiting matches against CS Longueuil and AS Blainville, placing them below Blainville in the standings. Their license was not renewed for the following season by the league due to administrative issues that the team had.

== Season ==
Season	League	Teams	Record	Rank	League Cup	Ref
2014	Première Ligue de soccer du Québec	6	4–5–11	6th	Quarter-finals	

== Notable former players ==
The following players have either played at the professional or international level, either before or after playing for the PLSQ team:

- (Canada) Jason Beaulieu
- (Haiti) Gabard Fénélon
- (Canada) Rocco Placentino
- (Canada) Frantzly Zephirin
