= Dimitrios Anastasopoulos =

Greek footballer

Personal information
- Full name: Dimitrios Anastasopoulos
- Date of birth: 11 April 1990 (age 36)
- Place of birth: Athens, Greece
- Height: 1.78 m (5 ft 10 in)
- Position: Midfielder

Team information
- Current team: Fostiras Ilioupoli

Youth career
- Charavgiakos
- –2008: Athinaikos

Senior career*
Years	Team	Apps	(Gls)
2008–2012	Panionios	34	(0)
2012–2013	Kavala	13	(1)
2013	AEK Athens	3	(0)
2013–2014	Jahn Regensburg	4	(0)
2014	Anagennisi Karditsas	7	(0)
2015	Sourmena F.C.	15	(3)
2015	Mont-Royal Outremont	16	(3)
2016	Sourmena F.C.	10	(2)
2016–2018	Charavgiakos	36	(14)
2018–2019	A.O. Psyloritis		
2019–2024	Charavgiakos	52	(4)
2024–	Fostiras Ilioupoli	25	(0)

International career
	Greece U-17	5	(1)
- * Club domestic league appearances and goals as of 21 January 2020

Dimitrios Anastasopoulos (Greek: Δημήτριος Αναστασόπουλος; born 11 April 1990) is a Greek professional footballer who plays for Fostiras Ilioupoli as a midfielder.

== Career ==
Anastasopoulos began playing professional football with Panionios. He also played for Kavala and AEK Athens. In August 2013, Anastasopoulos signed a contract with German 3. Liga club SSV Jahn Regensburg. Anastasopoulos helped Mont-Royal Outremont win the 2015 PLSQ Championship missing only two matches due to yellow card limit bans. He scored three goals.

== Honours ==
Mont-Royal Outremont

- PLSQ Championship: 2015
