= Julien Edwards =

Guyanese former footballer

Personal information
- Full name: Julien Edwards
- Date of birth: 30 July 1988 (age 38)
- Place of birth: Toronto, Ontario, Canada
- Position: Defender

College career
Years	Team	Apps	(Gls)
2006–2009	Drake Bulldogs		

Senior career*
Years	Team	Apps	(Gls)
2008	Ottawa Fury	10	(0)
2009	Des Moines Menace	11	(1)
2011	Capital City	23	(1)
2011–2012	Alpha United FC		
2012	Kingston FC		
2013–2016	FC Gatineau	51	(0)
2017	Toronto Skillz FC	5	(0)

International career
2012	Guyana	6	(0)
- * Club domestic league appearances and goals

Julien Edwards (born July 30, 1988) is a former footballer. Born in Canada, he represented the Guyana national team.

== Playing career ==
Edwards began playing at the college level with Drake Bulldogs in 2006, where he appeared in a total of 50 matches, and earned All-Missouri Valley Conference first team and was selected for the NSCAA All-Region team in 2009. During the college off season he played in the USL Premier Development League originally with Ottawa Fury, and later with Des Moines Menace.

In 2011, he signed his first professional contract with expansion franchise Capital City F.C. in the Canadian Soccer League. During his tenure with Ottawa he reached the CSL Championship against Toronto Croatia, where the match concluded in a 1–0 victory for Croatia. He later played in the GFF Elite League with Alpha United FC. Throughout his tenure with Alpha he featured in the 2011 CFU Club Championship. In 2012, he returned to the Canadian Soccer League to play with Kingston FC.

In 2013, he played in the Première Ligue de soccer du Québec with FC Gatineau. In 2017, he played in League1 Ontario with Toronto Skillz FC.

== International career ==
In 2010, he was called to a Canada men's national under-23 soccer team camp organized by head coach Tony Fonseca. Edwards instead made his debut for the Guyana national football team on March 31, 2012, in a friendly match against French Guiana. He featured in the 2012 Caribbean Cup qualification match against Saint Vincent and the Grenadines. In total he has earned six caps for Guyana.

== Honors ==
Alpha United FC

- GFF National Super League: 2012
