= Kevin Luarca =

Canadian soccer player (born 1993)

Personal information
- Full name: Kevin Ouidio Luarca-Echeverria
- Date of birth: October 15, 1993 (age 33)
- Place of birth: Caracas, Venezuela
- Height: 1.72 m (5 ft 8 in)
- Position: Midfielder

Youth career
- 2010–2013: Montreal Impact

Senior career*
Years	Team	Apps	(Gls)
2014	Montreal Impact U23	10	(3)
2015	FC Montreal	1	(0)
2016	FC Lanaudière	8	(1)

International career
2012	Canada U20		
- * Club domestic league appearances and goals

Kevin Luarca (born December 10, 1993) is a former soccer player. Born in Venezuela, he represented Canada internationally.

== Club career ==
=== Early career ===
Luarca joined the Montreal Impact Academy for the 2010 season in the Canadian Soccer League's first division. He would re-sign with the team in 2011. Before the commencement of the CSL season, he was named to the gameday roster for the Montreal Impact match against the Tampa Bay Rowdies on April 9, 2011, where he was an unused substitute. In his debut season in the inter-provincial circuit, he helped Montreal secure a playoff berth. Luarca would contribute a goal in the second match of the quarterfinal series against Capital City where Montreal was eliminated from the tournament.

He re-signed with the academy the following season. Luarca scored his first goal of the season on August 26, 2012, against the North York Astros. He would assist the club in securing another playoff berth by finishing second in the division. In the first round of the postseason, Montreal would defeat Toronto FC's academy to advance to the next round. Montreal would face the York Region Shooters in the semifinal and the club would successfully advance to the championship final. He participated in the championship final match where Toronto Croatia defeated Montreal.

In 2013, he played with the senior team's reserve squad in the MLS Reserve League. He made his debut for the reserve team on March 24, 2013, against the New York Red Bulls reserve team and recorded a goal. His final run with the academy was during the 2014 season when the team competed in the American-based USL Premier Development League.

=== FC Montreal ===
On March 13, 2015, it was announced that Luarca would join FC Montreal, a USL affiliate club of the Montreal Impact for their inaugural season. He made his debut for the club on March 28 in a 2–0 defeat to Toronto FC II. In 2016, he played in the Première Ligue de soccer du Québec with FC Lanaudière.

== International career ==
Luarca was selected to represent the Canada men's national under-20 soccer team in the 2012 Marbella Cup. In the opening match of the tournament, the Canadians defeated the United States on October 10, 2012.

== Honors ==
Montreal Impact Academy

- CSL Championship Runners-up: 2012
