= Anthony Legendre =

American soccer player

Personal information
- Date of birth: October 28, 1996 (age 30)
- Place of birth: Jacksonville, Florida, United States
- Height: 5 ft 6 in (1.68 m)
- Position: Left-back

Youth career
- Ottawa Royals SC
- 2012–2015: Ottawa Fury FC

College career
| Years | Team | Apps | (Gls) |
| 2016–2017 | Algonquin Thunder | 19 | (3) |

Senior career*
| Years | Team | Apps | (Gls) |
| 2015 | Ottawa Fury FC Academy | 10 | (0) |
| 2016 | FC Gatineau | 11 | (0) |
| 2018 | Hamilton Wanderers | | |
| 2018 | South Hobart | 6 | (0) |
| 2019 | Tulsa Roughnecks | 9 | (0) |
| 2021 | South Bend Lions | 11 | (0) |
| 2021 | Stumptown AC | 6 | (0) |
| 2023 | AS Blainville | 7 | (0) |
| 2024– | Ottawa South United | 17 | (0) |
- * Club domestic league appearances and goals as of September 30, 2024

Anthony Legendre (born October 28, 1996) is an American soccer player who plays as a left-back who plays for Ottawa South United in Ligue1 Québec.

== Early life ==
Legendre was born in Jacksonville, Florida and grew up in Miami and Jacksonville, where he played soccer at the local YMCA. At age twelve, he and his family emigrated to Canada, where they settled in Ottawa and Legendre began playing for local club Ottawa Royals. At age 15, Legendre joined the Ottawa Fury Academy.

== College career ==
In 2016 and 2017, Legendre attended Algonquin College, where he played for the men's soccer team. He was named the team's Rookie of the Year that season and was named to the OCAA East Division All-Star Team.

== Club career ==
In 2015, he played with the Ottawa Fury FC Academy in the Première ligue de soccer du Québec. In 2016, he joined FC Gatineau.

In March 2018, Legendre signed with the Hamilton Wanderers in the New Zealand first tier ISPS Handa Premiership.

In July 2018, Legendre joined NPL Tasmania side South Hobart. He participated in their 2019 pre-season, before departing the club.

In February 2019, Legendre signed with the Tulsa Roughnecks in the USL Championship.

In 2021, he played with the South Bend Lions in USL League Two.

In August 2021, he signed with Stumptown AC the National Independent Soccer Association.

In 2023, he played with AS Blainville in Ligue1 Quebec. In 2024, he played with Ottawa South United.

== Personal life ==
Legendre operates a YouTube Channel in which he describes his training and gives an inside look at the life of a professional/semi-professional soccer player.
