= FC Lanaudière =

- Full name: Football Club Lanaudière
- Short name: FCL
- Founded: 2016
- Stadium: Centre de Soccer Multifonctionnel de Terrebonne
- Executive Director: John Bellini
- Head Coach: Marco Torrens
- League: Première Ligue de soccer du Québec
- 2021: PLSQ, 9th
- Website: http://soccer-lanaudiere.qc.ca/fc-lanaudiere/

Football Club Lanaudière was a Canadian semi-professional soccer club based in Lanaudière-Nord, Quebec that plays in the Première Ligue de soccer du Québec. The club was founded in 2016 by the Association Régionale de Soccer (ARS) Lanaudière to replace FC L'Assomption-Lanaudière after the latter's departure from the PLSQ. The club was supported by the region's 14 affiliated amateur soccer clubs, and is the first club in the PLSQ to use this regional model.

== History ==
The club was formed in 2016 by the Association Régionale de Soccer (ARS) Lanaudière to replace FC L'Assomption-Lanaudière, one of its member clubs, which was leaving the league, to ensure that the region still had a presence in the Première Ligue de soccer du Québec. For their inaugural season, about 40% of the players were from Lanaudière, with the team aiming to have 80% of the roster come from the region within five years. Andrew Olivieri was the club's original head coach. In 2018, the club finished in last place in the league standings, but managed to win the League Cup, defeating FC Gatineau in the final in penalty kicks.

In 2021, it was announced that the club would transfer its license to CS Lanaudière-Nord (a club formed from the merger of previous license holder FC L'Assomption-Lanaudière and AS Laser).

== Seasons ==
Season	League	Teams	Record	Rank	League Cup	Ref
2016	Première Ligue de soccer du Québec	7	4–3–11	6th	Quarter-finals	
2017	Première Ligue de soccer du Québec	7	4–7–7	5th	Quarter-finals	
2018	Première Ligue de soccer du Québec	8	2–5–14	8th	Champions	
2019	Première Ligue de soccer du Québec	9	3–2–11	7th	Group stage	
2020	on hiatus – COVID-19					
2021	Première Ligue de soccer du Québec	10 (Note: Ottawa South United withdrew from the 2021 league mid-way through due to government restrictions, with their matches removed from the standings. Thus, Lanaudière's victory and loss against Ottawa are not included in their record.)	1–1–14	9th	–	

== Notable former players ==
The following players have either played at the professional or international level, either before or after playing for the PLSQ team:

- (Morocco) Hicham Aâboubou
- (Haiti) Gabard Fénélon
- (Algeria) (Canada) Chakib Hocine
- (Venezuela) (Canada) Kevin Luarca
- (Canada) Protais Mutambala
- (Canada) Luca Ricci
- (Canada) Gabriel Wiethaeuper-Balbinotti

== Coaching history ==
- (Canada) Andrew Olivieri (2016-17)
- (Canada) Mike Vitulano (2017-18)
- (Canada) Giuseppe Cortese (2018-19)
- (Canada) (Portugal) Kevin Mendes Duarte (2020-2021)
- (Canada) (Costa Rica) Marco Antonio Torrens (2021)

== Honours ==
- Coupe PLSQ (1): 2018

== See also ==
- FC L'Assomption-Lanaudière
