= Frantzly Zephirin =

Canadian soccer player (born 1992)

Personal information
- Date of birth: August 14, 1992 (age 34)
- Place of birth: Montreal, Quebec, Canada
- Height: 1.72 m (5 ft 8 in)
- Positions: Right-back; midfielder

College career
Years	Team	Apps	(Gls)
2013–2014	Essex County Wolverines	22	(7)
2015–2016	MidAmerica Nazarene Pioneers	38	(1)

Senior career*
Years	Team	Apps	(Gls)
2014	ACP Montréal-Nord	10	(1)
2015	CS Mont-Royal Outremont	1	(0)
2017	Ocean City Nor'easters	8	(0)
2018	B71	12	(0)
2019	Tulsa Roughnecks	3	(0)
Total		34	(1)
- * Club domestic league appearances and goals as of 24 October 2019

Frantzly Zephirin (born August 14, 1992) is a Canadian former soccer player.

== College career ==
In 2013, Zephirin began attending Essex County College, where he played for the men's soccer team. In 2013, he was named to the NJCAA All-Region XIX First Team In 2014, he was named the All Region XIX Player of the Year. and the NJCAA All-American Second Team.

In 2015, he began attending MidAmerica Nazarene University, where he played for the men's soccer team. In 2016, he was named to the All-HAAC First Team and the HAAC Defensive MVP, the NSCAA All-Midwest Region First Team and the NAIA All-America Second Team. He helped them finish as national runner-ups in 2015 and HAAC Conference champions in 2016.

== Club career ==
In 2014, Zephirin played for Première Ligue de soccer du Québec side ACP Montréal-Nord. In 2015, Zephirin joined CS Mont-Royal Outremont.

In 2017, Zephirin played with Premier Development League side Ocean City Nor'easters.

In June 2018, he signed with Faroese 1. deild side B71.

In February 2019, Zephirin signed with the Tulsa Roughnecks in the USL Championship. He had limited playing time that season, making only three appearances.

== International career ==
In June 2013, Zephirin received a call-up to the Haitian national team for a preparation camp ahead of the 2013 CONCACAF Gold Cup.
