= Protais Mutambala =

Tanzanian-born Canadian soccer player

Personal information
- Full name: Protais-Hamza Bumbu-Mutambala
- Date of birth: February 8, 1999 (age 27)
- Place of birth: Nyarugusu, Tanzania
- Height: 1.64 m (5 ft 5 in)
- Position: Midfielder

Youth career
- 2009–2015: AS Sud-Ouest Montréal
- 2015–2018: Montreal Impact

Senior career*
Years	Team	Apps	(Gls)
2018	CS Longueuil	6	(2)
2019	Ottawa Fury	8	(0)
2021	FC Lanaudière	10	(2)
2022–	CS Mont-Royal Outremont	7	(0)

International career
2015	Canada U18	1+	(0)
- * Club domestic league appearances and goals as of October 2, 2022

Protais-Hamza Bumbu-Mutambala (born February 8, 1999) is a soccer player who plays for CS Mont-Royal Outremont. Born in Tanzania, he has represented Canada at youth level.

== Early life ==
Mutambala was born in a refugee camp in Nyarugusu, Tanzania, but grew up in Quebec City in Canada. He began playing youth soccer at age 10 with AS Sud-Ouest Montréal. Afterwards, he joined the Montreal Impact Academy, after being scouted playing in the Jeux de la rue.

== Club career ==
In 2018, Mutambala played with Première Ligue de soccer du Québec side CS Longueuil.

In April 2019, Mutambala joined USL Championship side Ottawa Fury FC. After one seasons with the Fury, the club would cease operations for the 2020 season, making Mutambala a free agent.

In 2021, he played with FC Lanaudière in the Première Ligue de soccer du Québec.

In 2022, he joined another PLSQ side CS Mont-Royal Outremont, where he got to compete in the 2022 Canadian Championship.

== International career ==
In 2015, he attended a youth camp with the Canadian U16 national team.

In October 2015, he played with the Canada U18 in a pair of friendlies against the United States U18.
