= Philippe Davies =

Canadian retired soccer player

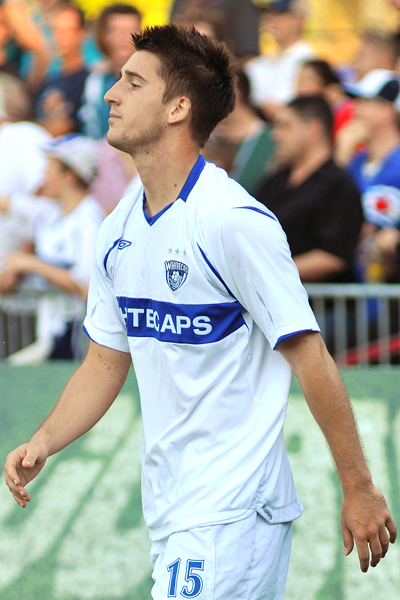

Personal information
- Date of birth: December 12, 1990 (age 35)
- Place of birth: Longueuil, Quebec, Canada
- Height: 6 ft 0 in (1.83 m)
- Positions: Midfielder; defender

Team information
- Current team: CS Longueuil
- Number: 15

Youth career
- 2003–2005: FC Sélect Rive-Sud
- 2006: Dijon
- 2006–2007: FC Sélect Rive-Sud

Senior career*
Years	Team	Apps	(Gls)
2008–2009	Vancouver Whitecaps	22	(3)
2009–2010	Vancouver Whitecaps	29	(1)
2011	Vancouver Whitecaps FC	0	(0)
2011	→ Vancouver Whitecaps FC U-23 (loan)	11	(3)
2012–2013	Richmond Kickers	25	(1)
2014–2015	Ottawa Fury FC	30	(1)
2016–2017	CS Longueuil	34	(6)

International career
2006–2007	Canada U17	11	(4)
2008–2009	Canada U20	10	(0)
2012	Canada U23	4	(0)
2013	Canada	1	(0)
- * Club domestic league appearances and goals as of October 25, 2017

Philippe Davies (born December 12, 1990) is a Canadian retired soccer player.

== Career ==
=== Youth and college ===
Born in Longueuil, Quebec, Davies attended Collège Français in his hometown. He played for the under-15 and under-16 sides of Ligue de soccer élite du Québec team FC Select South Shore AAA from 2003 to 2005. He spent a year in France in 2006, playing for the under-16 and reserve team of Ligue 2 team Dijon FCO, before playing for the FC Select South Shore AAA under-18 side in 2007.

He signed for the Vancouver Whitecaps Residency on October 10, 2007, playing for them in the USL Premier Development League in 2008 and 2009 season.

=== Professional ===
Davies made his debut for the senior Vancouver Whitecaps team in a 4–0 victory over Minnesota Thunder on July 9, 2009.

Vancouver declined its 2012 contract option on Davies on January 20, 2012.

After two seasons with the Richmond Kickers, Davies signed with the Ottawa Fury in their first North American Soccer League season in 2014.

Davies was re-signed by Ottawa for the 2015 season, but would only make 5 appearances after breaking his arm in pre-season. In August 2015, he announced his retirement at the age of 24 and his move to a coaching position with ARS Rive-Sud where he grew up. This was due to his father's battle with cancer and the resulting need to be close to his family. In December 2015 however, Davies signed with local PLSQ club CS Longueuil at the instigation of the club's then-head coach, Mathieu Rufié.

=== International ===
Davies is a former Canada under-17 and under-20 member and he played 17 games, scoring four goals for both teams. Davies made his senior team debut on January 26, 2013, in a friendly against Denmark as a second half sub for Terry Dunfield, the game ended as a 4–0 defeat.

== Personal life ==
His father Randolph is former professional Canadian baseball player who was born in Montreal, Quebec, and his mother was born in Saint-Jean d’Iberville, Quebec. Davies played hockey and soccer in his childhood.

== Club statistics ==
Season	Team	League	League		Playoffs		Domestic Cup		Total	
Season	Team	League	Apps	Goals	Apps	Goals	Apps	Goals	Apps	Goals
2009	Vancouver Whitecaps	USL-1	2	0	-	-	-	-	2	0
2010	Vancouver Whitecaps	USSF D-2	27	1	4	0	1	0	32	1
2011	Vancouver Whitecaps FC	MLS	0	0	-	-	-	-	0	0
Career Total			29	1	4	0	1	0	34	1

Updated: August 20, 2011
