= 2014 Première ligue de soccer du Québec season =

Première ligue de soccer du Québec
- Season: 2014
- Champions: CS Longueuil
- Cup champions: FC Gatineau
- Matches: 60
- Goals: 229 (3.82 per match)
- Top goalscorer: Frederico Moojen (15) (FC L'Assomption-Lanaudière)

The 2014 PLSQ season was the third season of existence for the Première ligue de soccer du Québec, a Division 3 men's semi-professional soccer league and the highest level of soccer fully contained within the province of Québec. It is below Major League Soccer and the North American Soccer League in the Canadian soccer league system, and on the same level as League1 Ontario.

CS Mont-Royal Outremont were the defending league and league cup champions from 2013.

CS Longueuil won the league championship this season, while FC Gatineau won the League cup.

== Teams ==
The 2014 season was contested between six teams - four teams returning from the previous season, with CS Longueuil and ACP Montréal-Nord joining the league while FC Boisbriand, FC Brossard, and the inaugural champion FC St-Léonard did not return. FC L'Assomption became known as FC L'Assomption-Lanaudière.

Team	City	Stadium	Head Coach
AS Blainville	Blainville, Laurentides	Stade du Parc Blainville	(France) Jean-Pierre Ceriani
FC Gatineau	Gatineau, Outaouais	Terrain Mont Bleu	(France) Josy Madelonet
FC L'Assomption-Lanaudière	L'Assomption, Lanaudière	Stade André-Courcelles	(Costa Rica) Marco Torrens
CS Longueuil	Longueuil, Montérégie	Centre Multi Sport	(France) Mathieu Rufié
ACP Montréal-Nord	Montréal-Nord, Montréal	Parc Saint-Laurent	(Canada) Harry Makdessian
CS Mont-Royal Outremont	Mont-Royal, Montréal	REC Mont-Royal	(Canada) Luc Brutus

== Season standings ==
Pos	Team	Pld	W	D	L	GF	GA	GD	Pts	Qualification
1	CS Longueuil	20	10	9	1	49	23	+26	39	League champion
2	FC Gatineau	20	8	9	3	34	23	+11	33	
3	CS Mont-Royal Outremont	20	9	5	6	48	34	+14	32	
4	FC L'Assomption-Lanaudière	20	8	3	9	35	42	−7	27	
5	AS Blainville	20	4	3	13	37	51	−14	15	
6	ACP Montréal-Nord	20	4	5	11	26	56	−30	15 (Note: ACP Montréal-Nord was deducted 2 points for forfeits against CS Longueuil and AS Blainville.)	

Source: Publication Sports

=== Top scorers ===
Rank	Player	Club	Goals
1	Frederico Moojen	FC L'Assomption-Lanaudière	15
2	Wassym Amara	CS Mont-Royal Outremont	14
3	Dex Kaniki	CS Longueuil	13
4	Maxime Daigle	FC Gatineau	8
4	Pascal Aoun	CS Mont-Royal Outremont	8

=== Awards ===
Award	Player (club)	Ref
Ballon d'or (Best Player)	Horace Patient Sobze Zemo (FC Gatineau)	
Ballon d'argent (2nd Best Player)	Nicolas Bertrand (AS Blainville)	
Ballon de bronze (3rd Best Player)	Gabard Fénélon (FC St-Léonard)	
Golden Boot (Top Scorer)	Frederico Moojen (FC L’Assomption-Lanaudière)	
Coach of the Year	Mathieu Rufié (CS Longueuil)	

== Cup ==
CS Mont-Royal Outremont (as 2013's champion) and AS Blainville (by random draw) received byes through to the semi-finals.

First Round
ACP Montréal-Nord	0	1	1
FC Gatineau	1	1	2
FC L'Assomption-Lanaudière	0	2	2
CS Longueuil	3	3	6

Semifinals
AS Blainville	0	0	0
FC Gatineau	3	2	5
CS Longueuil	2	3	5
CS Mont-Royal Outremont	3	1	4

Finals
FC Gatineau	1
CS Longueuil	0

=== First round ===
10 August 2014
1:30 pm

ACP Montréal-Nord	0 - 1	FC Gatineau

Stade Hébert, Montréal-Nord
29 August 2014
8:00 pm

FC Gatineau	1 - 1	ACP Montréal-Nord

Mont-Bleu, Gatineau

10 August 2014
5:00 pm

FC L'Assomption-Lanaudière	0 - 3	CS Longueuil

André Courcelles, L'Assomption
30 August 2014
7:00 pm

CS Longueuil	3 - 2	FC L'Assomption-Lanaudière

Centre Multi Sport, Longueuil

=== Semifinals ===
14 September 2014
2:00 pm

FC Gatineau	3 - 0	AS Blainville

Mont Bleu, Gatineau
28 September 2014
3:30 pm

AS Blainville	0 - 2	FC Gatineau

Parc Blainville, Blainville

14 September 2014
3:30 pm

CS Longueuil	2 - 3	CS Mont-Royal Outremont

Centre Multi Sport, Longueuil
28 September 2014
6:30 pm

CS Mont-Royal Outremont	1 - 3	CS Longueuil

TMR REC 3, Mont-Royal Outremont

=== Final ===
18 October 2014
3:00 pm

FC Gatineau	1 - 0	CS Longueuil

Bois de Boulogne, Laval

== Inter-Provincial Cup Championship ==
The Inter-Provincial Cup Championship was announced on October 14, 2014 as a two-legged home-and-away series between the league champions of League1 Ontario and the Première ligue de soccer du Québec - the only Division 3 men's semi-professional soccer leagues based fully within Canada.

November 01, 2014
8:00pm

CS Longueuil	0 - 4	Toronto FC Academy
	Report	Sacramento 2', 38'; Kaye 10'; Uccello 48'

Bell Sports Complex, Brossard
November 08, 2014
8:00pm

Toronto FC Academy	0 - 0	CS Longueuil
	Report

Pickering Soccer Complex, Pickering

Toronto FC Academy won 4-0 on aggregate
