= Gilbert Bayiha N'Djema =

French footballer (born 1979)

Gilbert Bayiha
Personal information
- Full name: Gilbert Bayiha-N'Djema
- Date of birth: 9 August 1979 (age 47)
- Place of birth: Les Ulis, France
- Height: 1.84 m (6 ft 0 in)
- Position: Goalkeeper

Youth career
- Red Star 93

Senior career*
Years	Team	Apps	(Gls)
2000–2001	Red Star 93	3	(0)
2001–2003	Sedan B	75	(0)
2003–2007	Grenoble	64	(0)
2007	→ Aris Limassol (loan)	8	(0)
2007–2012	Aris Limassol	67	(0)
2008–2009	→ PAEEK (loan)	24	(0)
2014–2017	CS Longueuil	21	(0)
Total		262	(0)

Managerial career
- 2016–: CS Longueuil (reserves)
- * Club domestic league appearances and goals as of 15 April 2016

Gilbert Bayiha-N'Djema (born 9 August 1979) is a French former footballer. He is currently the head coach of CS Longueuil's reserve team.

== Personal ==
N'Djema holds both Cameroonian and French nationalities.
