= 2021 Première ligue de soccer du Québec season =

Première ligue de soccer du Québec Men's Division
- Season: 2021
- Dates: July 3 – October 20
- Champions: CS Mont-Royal Outremont
- Matches: 72
- Goals: 238 (3.31 per match)
- Top goalscorer: Joseph Saint Simon (12) (CS Mont-Royal Outremont)

The 2021 Première ligue de soccer du Québec season was the tenth season of play for the Première ligue de soccer du Québec, a Division 3 semi-professional soccer league in the Canadian soccer pyramid and the highest level of soccer based in the Canadian province of Québec.

A.S. Blainville were the defending champions. CS Mont-Royal Outremont won their fourth men's title and first since 2016.

AS Blainville competed in the 2021 Canadian Championship, losing in the first round to Canadian Premier League club HFX Wanderers FC.

== Changes from 2020 and Changes due to pandemic ==
The 2021 will have its greatest number of participating teams with 10 teams. Royal-Sélect de Beauport will field a team in the male division for the first time, while FC Lanaudière, CS Mont-Royal Outremont, and CS Monteuil return from hiatus, after not playing in 2020 due to the COVID-19 pandemic. CS Fabrose became FC Laval following a merger with two other local clubs.

As with the 2020 PLSQ season, the start of the season was delayed due to the pandemic. The men's championship will run from July 3 to October 17, with each of the ten each opposing team twice for a total of 18 games, with the Coupe PLSQ being cancelled. The Reserve Division will once again operate with each team playing 16 matches.

== Teams ==
Ten teams participated in the 2021 season. The league champion will earn a place in the 2022 Canadian Championship.

Team	City	Stadium
A.S. Blainville	Blainville, Laurentides	Parc Blainville
Celtix du Haut-Richelieu	Saint-Jean-sur-Richelieu, Montérégie	Stade Alphonse-Desjardins
FC Laval	Laval, Laval	Collège Montmorency
FC Lanaudière	Terrebonne, Lanaudière	Parc André-Courcelles
CS Longueuil	Longueuil, Montérégie	Parc Laurier
CS Mont-Royal Outremont	Mount Royal, Montréal	Parc Recreatif de TMR
CS Monteuil	Laval, Laval	Parc de Lausanne
CS St-Hubert	Saint-Hubert, Montérégie	Centre Sportif Roseanne-Laflamme
Ottawa South United	Ottawa, Ontario	George Nelms Sports Park
Royal-Sélect de Beauport	Beauport, Quebec City	Stade Beauport

== Standings ==
On 16 September, Ottawa South United was forced to withdraw from the league due to government restrictions and cross-border difficulties, with their played matches removed from the rankings (their record was 1–2–7 at the time).

Pos	Team	Pld	W	D	L	GF	GA	GD	Pts	Qualification
1	CS Mont-Royal Outremont (C)	16	13	1	2	37	12	+25	40	2022 Canadian Championship
2	A.S. Blainville	16	11	3	2	39	15	+24	36	
3	Celtix du Haut-Richelieu	16	8	3	5	26	22	+4	27	
4	FC Laval	16	7	5	4	30	20	+10	26	
5	CS St-Hubert	16	8	2	6	31	29	+2	26	
6	CS Longueuil	16	7	2	7	21	25	−4	23	
7	CS Monteuil	16	4	2	10	16	26	−10	14	
8	Royal-Sélect de Beauport	16	3	1	12	18	44	−26	10	
9	FC Lanaudière	16	1	1	14	20	45	−25	4	
10	Ottawa South United	0	–	–	–	–	–	—	0	Removed due to border restrictions

Source: PLSQ
(C) Champions

Removed Matches vs OSU (H/A)
Mont-Royal Outremont	–	4–1
Blainville	2–1	–
Celtix du Haut-Richelieu	3–1	–
FC Laval	–	2–2
St-Hubert	–	–
Longueuil	5–1	–
Monteuil	4–1	2–0
RS Beauport	–	1–1
Lanaudière	1–3	2–0

Throughout the season, the PLSQ teams played friendly matches with CF Montréal U23, with the matches not counting to the overall standings.

Friendlies vs CF Montréal U23
	Home	@ MTL	@ MTL
CS Mont-Royal Outremont	0–6	1–0	1–2
A.S. Blainville	3–4	–	–
Celtix du Haut-Richelieu	2–2	–	–
CS St-Hubert	–	2–3	–
FC Laval	–	1–2	–
CS Longueuil	1–2	1–1	–
CS Monteuil	–	0–1	–
Royal-Sélect de Beauport	–	–	–
FC Lanaudière	–	1–5	–
Ottawa South United	–	–	–

=== Top scorers ===
Includes goals in matches against Ottawa South United

Rank	Player	Club	Goals
1	Joseph Greguy Saint Simon	CS Mont-Royal Outremont	12
2	Mamadi Camara	Celtix du Haut-Richelieu	11
3	Flavio Colasanti	CS Mont-Royal Outremont	8
3	Adama Sissoko	FC Laval	8
5	Mouad Ouzane	CS Mont-Royal Outremont	7
5	Yves Wesley Wandje Djomze	CS St-Hubert	7
7	Saad Chaouki	CS St-Hubert	6
7	Mitchell Syla	FC Lanaudière	6

=== Awards ===
Award	Player (club)	Ref
Ballon d'or (Best Player)	Adama Sissoko (FC Laval)	
Ballon d'argent (2nd Best Player)	Billal Qsiyer (CS Mont-Royal Outremont)	
Ballon de bronze (3rd Best Player)	Peter Scuccimarri (FC Lanaudière)	
Golden Boot (Top Scorer)	Joseph Greguy Saint-Simon (CS Mont-Royal Outremont)	
Coach of the Year	Luc Brutus (CS Mont-Royal Outremont)	

== Reserve Division ==
The league operated a reserve division. In early September, some teams (CS St-Hubert, FC Lanaudière, Ottawa South United, and Royal-Sélect de Beauport) opted out of the remaining matches in the reserve division, with their remaining matches not completed.

Pos	Team	Pld	W	D	L	GF	GA	GD	Pts	PPG
1	A.S. Blainville Reserves	12	10	0	2	35	15	+20	30	2.50
2	CS Monteuil Reserves	11	6	2	3	21	13	+8	20	1.82
3	FC Laval Reserves	13	6	2	5	23	23	0	20	1.54
4	CS St-Hubert Reserves	8	6	1	1	22	10	+12	19	2.38
5	Royal-Sélect de Beauport Reserves	10	5	2	3	20	16	+4	17	1.70
6	CS Mont-Royal Outremont Reserves	12	4	3	5	15	19	−4	15	1.25
7	Celtix du Haut-Richelieu Reserves	14	4	2	8	22	29	−7	14	1.00
8	Ottawa South United Reserves	7	2	1	4	8	15	−7	7	1.00
9	CS Longueuil Reserves	13	2	1	10	17	34	−17	7	0.54
10	FC Lanaudière Reserves	8	2	0	6	18	27	−9	6	0.75

Updated to match(es) played on 17 October 2021. Source: TSI Sports
