= 2015 Première ligue de soccer du Québec season =

Première ligue de soccer du Québec
- Season: 2015
- Champions: CS Mont-Royal Outremont
- Cup champions: Lakeshore SC
- Matches: 63
- Goals: 218 (3.46 per match)
- Top goalscorer: Frederico Moojen (18) (CS Mont-Royal Outremont)
- Biggest home win: L'Assomption-Lanaudière 4-0 Lakeshore (31 May 2015); L'Assomption-Lanaudière 4-0 Gatineau (18 October 2015)
- Biggest away win: Gatineau 1-7 Mont-Royal Outremont (20 Sept 2015)

The 2015 Première ligue de soccer du Québec season is the fourth season of play for the Première ligue de soccer du Québec; the highest level of soccer based in the Canadian province of Québec and one of two Division 3 semi-professional soccer leagues in the Canadian soccer pyramid (the other being League1 Ontario).

The season began on 2 May 2015 and ended on 18 October 2015, with the cup final taking place on 24 October 2015. CS Longueuil was the defending champion from 2014.

CS Mont-Royal Outremont won the League championship.

== Changes from 2014 ==
Two new teams joined the league for this season, while ACP Montréal-Nord did not return due to administrative difficulties. Joining the league are Lakeshore SC, which is based in the southwestern portion of the island of Montreal, while the other is an academy team of Ottawa Fury FC, whose primary team competes in the Division 2 North American Soccer League. This expansion into Ottawa marks the first time a team from outside Québec will take part in the PLSQ, with Fury FC citing the proximity of other teams as making the PLSQ a logical choice.

This season will also feature the arrival of a reserve division, which will allow PLSQ teams to establish a youth development pathway. In addition, the league commissioned Montreal composer Vincent Duhaime-Perreault to compose an anthem for the league, which will be played prior to all season and cup matches.

== Teams ==
Locations of teams within Greater Montreal for the 2015 PLSQ season.

Team	City	Stadium	Joined	Head coach
AS Blainville	Blainville, Laurentides	Stade du Parc Blainville	2012	(France) Jean-Pierre Ceriani
FC Gatineau	Gatineau, Outaouais	Terrain Mont Bleu	2013	(France) Josy Madelonet
Lakeshore SC	Kirkland, Montréal	Bénévoles Park	2015	(United States) Bill Sedgewick
FC L'Assomption-Lanaudière	L'Assomption, Lanaudière	Stade André-Courcelles	2012	(Costa Rica) Marco Torrens
CS Longueuil	Longueuil, Montérégie	Centre Multi Sport	2014	(France) Mathieu Rufié
CS Mont-Royal Outremont	Mont-Royal, Montréal	REC Mont-Royal	2013	(Canada) Luc Brutus
Ottawa Fury FC Academy	Ottawa, Ontario	Algonquin College	2015	(Canada) Phillip Dos Santos

== Standings ==
Each team will play 18 matches as part of the season; three matches against each other team in the league split home and away. There are no playoffs at the end of the season; the first-place team will be crowned as league champion and will face the L1O league champion in the Inter-Provincial Cup.

Pos	Team	Pld	W	D	L	GF	GA	GD	Pts	Qualification
1	CS Mont-Royal Outremont	18	11	3	4	44	24	+20	36	Inter-Provincial Cup vs L1O Champion
2	Lakeshore FC	18	10	5	3	36	21	+15	35	
3	AS Blainville	18	8	6	4	32	26	+6	30	
4	CS Longueuil	18	7	5	6	27	28	−1	26	
5	Ottawa Fury FC Academy	18	6	0	12	23	32	−9	18	
6	FC L'Assomption-Lanaudière	18	5	2	11	32	41	−9	17	
7	FC Gatineau	18	4	3	11	24	46	−22	15	

Source: Publication Sports

=== Top scorers ===
Rank	Player	Club	Goals
1	(Canada) Frederico Moojen	CS Mont-Royal Outremont	18
2	(Canada) Pierre-Rudolph Mayard	FC L'Assomption-Lanaudière	15
3	(Republic of the Congo) Dex Kaniki	Lakeshore SC	11
4	(Canada) Berlin Jean-Gilles	AS Blainville	8
4	(Canada) Cédric Carrié	Lakeshore SC	8
4	(Canada) Paymon Kabiri	Lakeshore SC	8
7	(Canada) Mohamed Dagnogo	Ottawa Fury FC Academy	6
7	(Canada) Pierre Rancy	AS Blainville	6
9	(Canada) Sean Rosa	CS Mont-Royal Outremont	5
9	(Canada) El Mehdi Ibn Brahim	CS Longueuil	5

=== Awards ===
Award	Player (club)	Ref
Ballon d'or (Best Player)	Dimitrios Anastasopoulos (CS Mont-Royal Outremont)	
Ballon d'argent (2nd Best Player)	Pierre-Rudolph Mayard (FC L’Assomption-Lanaudière)	
Ballon de bronze (3rd Best Player)	Mohamed Dagnogo (Ottawa Fury FC Academy)	
Golden Boot (Top Scorer)	Frederico Moojen (CS Mont-Royal Outremont)	
Coach of the Year	Emmanuel Macagno (AS Blainville)	

== Cup ==
2015 PLSQ Cup
Coupe PLSQ

Tournament details
- Country: Canada; Quebec
- Dates: June 14 - October 24, 2015
- Teams: 7

Final positions
- Champions: Lakeshore
- Runners-up: Mont-Royal Outremont

Tournament statistics
- Matches played: 11
- Goals scored: 31 (2.82 per match)
- Top goal scorer: Hicham Makhoukh (3)

The cup tournament is a separate contest from the rest of the season, in which all seven teams from the league take part, and is unrelated to the season standings. It is not a form of playoffs at the end of the season (as is typically seen in North American sports), but is a competition running in parallel to the regular season (similar to the Canadian Championship or the FA Cup), albeit only for PLSQ teams. All matches are separate from the regular season, and are not reflected in the season standings.

The 2015 PLSQ Cup will maintain the same format as the previous season, as a two-game aggregate knockout tournament with a single match final. As defending champion, FC Gatineau will obtain a bye for the first round.

First round
1	Gatineau
8	(BYE)
4	Lakeshore	2	1	3
5	Ottawa Fury Academy	1	0	1
2	Longueuil	1	0	1
7	Blainville	2	2	4
3	FC L'Assomption-Lanaudière	2	1	3
6	Mont-Royal Outremont	3	3	6

Semifinals
Gatineau	0	0	0 (3)
Lakeshore (pen.)	0	0	0 (5)
Blainville	0	1	1
Mont-Royal Outremont	4	2	6

Finals
Lakeshore (aet)	4
Mont-Royal Outremont	2

=== First round ===
14 June 2015	Ottawa Fury Academy	1 – 2	Lakeshore	Raven Road Field, Carleton University
3:30 pm	Schroeter 66'	Report	Saidi 7'; El Ali 36'	Attendance: 91; Referee: Timothy Wong

11 July 2015	Lakeshore	1 – 0	Ottawa Fury Academy	Bénévoles Park
7:00 pm	Kaniki 2'	Report		Referee: Gilmar Hernandez

14 June 2015	Blainville	2 – 1	Longueuil	Parc Blainville 1
4:00 pm	Makhoukh 83'; Sylla 87'	Report	Hasnat Kashem 4'	Referee: Pierre-Luc Lauziere

11 July 2015	Longueuil	0 – 2	Blainville	Centre Multi-sports 1
4:00 pm		Report	Makhoukh 36'; Sylla 46'	Referee: Marie-Han Gagnon-Chretien

14 June 2015	Mont-Royal Outremont	3 – 2	L'Assomption-Lanaudière	TMR REC 3
6:30 pm	Anastasopoulos 35'; Dagrou 69' de Souza 81' (pen.)	Report	Fournier 33' (pen.), 88' (pen.)	Attendance: 300; Referee: Okba Benbaka

12 July 2015	L'Assomption-Lanaudière	1 – 3	Mont-Royal Outremont	André Courcelles
1:00 pm	Romero 48'	Report	Dias 31'; Sissoko 67'; Rosa 73'	Referee: Mathieu Asselin

=== Semifinals ===
8 August 2015	Lakeshore	0 – 0	Gatineau	Bénévoles Park
8:00 pm		Report		Referee: Younes Cherid

6 September 2015	Gatineau	0 – 0 (a.e.t.) (3 – 5 p)	Lakeshore	Mont-Bleu 4
4:00 pm		Report		Referee: Christopher Grabas

8 August 2015	Mont-Royal Outremont	4 – 0	Blainville	TMR REC 3
5:00 pm	Moojen; Rosa; Téoli; Sissoko	Report		Attendance: 101; Referee: Taras Lesiuk Pokynboroda

5 September 2015	Blainville	1 – 2	Mont-Royal Outremont	Parc Blainville 1
7:00 pm	Makhoukh	Report	Dagrou; Djema	Referee: Francis LaTulippe

=== Final ===
24 October 2015	Lakeshore	4 – 2 (a.e.t.)	Mont-Royal Outremont	Bois-de-Boulogne, Laval
4:00 pm	Carrié 34'; Fénélon (yellow card) 59' (yellow-red card) 62'; Sisti 68'; Kaniki 91' (pen.); Antwi 117'	Report	Moojen 66' (pen.); Reale 85'	Referee: Christopher Grabas

== Inter-Provincial Cup Championship ==
The Inter-Provincial Cup Championship was a two-legged home-and-away series between the league champions of League1 Ontario and the Première ligue de soccer du Québec – the only Division 3 men's semi-professional soccer leagues based fully within Canada.

November 1, 2015
1:30pm

Oakville Blue Devils	3–1	CS Mont-Royal Outremont
Wason 3', 36'; Ellis 65'	Report	Dagrou 19'

Ontario Soccer Centre, Vaughan
November 14, 2014
6:00pm

CS Mont-Royal Outremont	2–2	Oakville Blue Devils
Sissoko 28'; Ritchie-Andy 36'	Report	Mitchell 55'; Novak 85'

Complexes Sportifs Terrebonne, Terrebonne

Oakville Blue Devils won 5–3 on aggregate

== Reserve Division ==
The league operated a reserve division.

Pos	Team	Pld	W	D	L	GF	GA	GD	Pts
1	CS Longueuil Reserves	18	11	3	4	41	25	+16	36
2	CS Mont-Royal Outremont Reserves	18	10	4	4	49	29	+20	34
3	AS Blainville Reserves	18	9	4	5	43	34	+9	31
4	FC L'Assomption-Lanaudière Reserves	18	10	1	7	42	43	−1	31
5	FC Gatineau Reserves	18	5	2	11	22	39	−17	17
6	Ottawa Fury FC Academy Reserves	18	4	4	10	21	32	−11	16
7	Lakeshore FC Reserves	18	5	0	13	29	45	−16	15

Source: http://www.tsisports.ca/soccer/archiveLigue/l_classam.aspx
