= Gabard Fénélon =

Haitian footballer (born 1981)

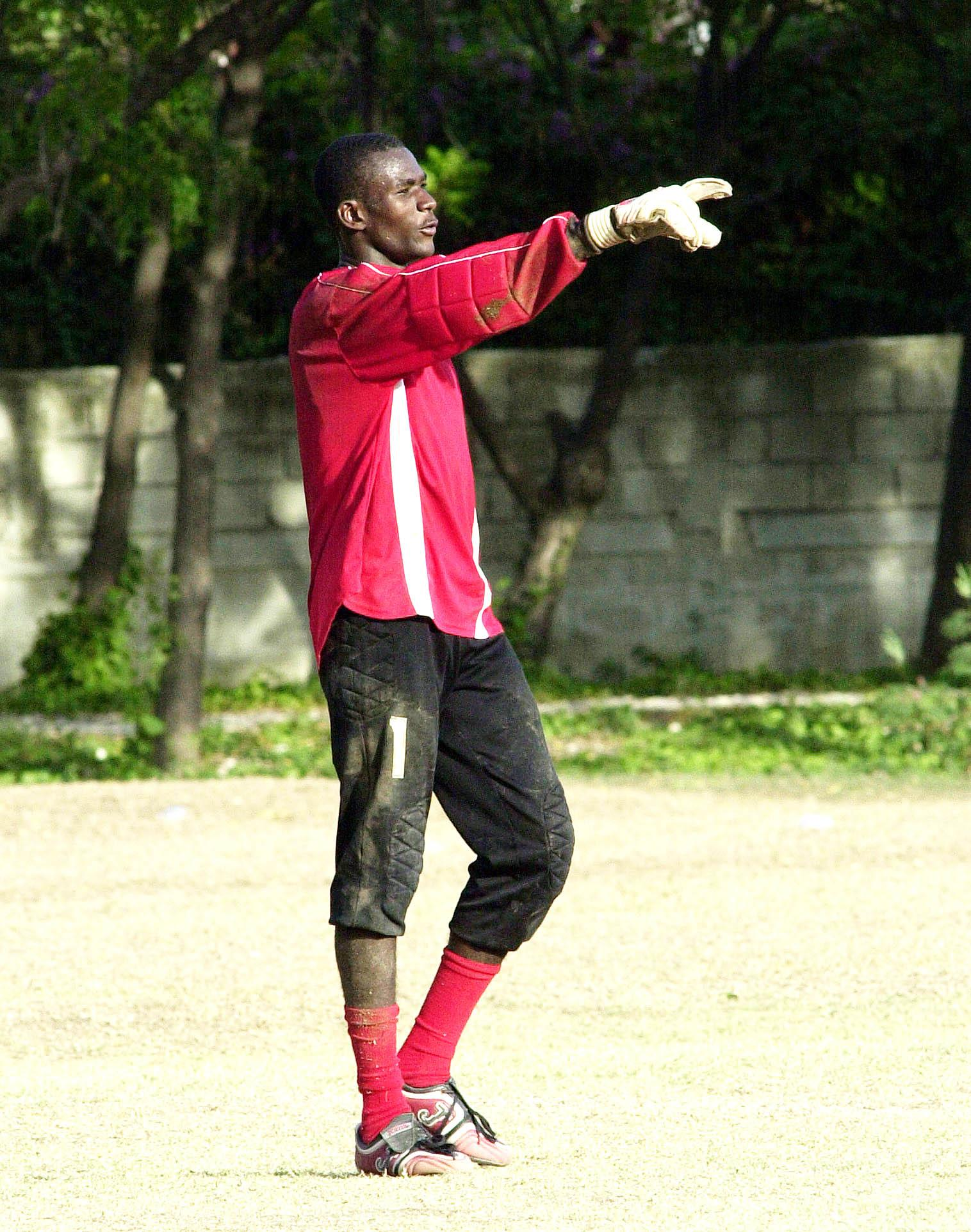
- Fénélon in August 2004

Personal information
- Full name: Gabard Fénélon
- Date of birth: 3 June 1981 (age 45)
- Place of birth: Tortuga, Haiti
- Height: 1.88 m (6 ft 2 in)
- Position: Goalkeeper

Team information
- Current team: CS Mont-Royal Outremont
- Number: 1

Senior career*
Years	Team	Apps	(Gls)
2002–2003	Racing Gonaïves		
2004–2006	Racing Club Haïtien		
2007	Miami FC	5	(0)
2008–2010	Racing Club Haïtien		
2011	Panellinios		
2012–2013	FC Saint-Léonard	32	(0)
2014	ACP Montréal-Nord	14	(1)
2015–2016	Lakeshore SC	30	(0)
2017	FC Lanaudière	16	(0)
2018–	CS Mont-Royal Outremont	100	(1)

International career^{‡}
2003–2008	Haiti	34	(0)
- * Club domestic league appearances and goals as of 30 September 2025 ‡ National team caps and goals as of 17 February 2008

Gabard Fénélon (born 3 June 1981) is a Haitian footballer who plays as a goalkeeper for Canadian Ligue1 Québec club CS Mont-Royal Outremont.

== Early years ==
Fénelon was born in Tortuga (Île de la Tortue), a small Haitian island in the northwest of the country. At the age of fourteen, his football talents led him to Port-de-Paix, a major city adjacent to Tortuga, inland of Haiti across the coast to develop his skills. Having been significantly better than his peers his own age, he was played against players who were older. Arriving as a striker, his position was changed to goalkeeper at age sixteen at the regional level.

== Club career ==
Fénelon played for Haitian League sides Racing Gonaïves and Racing Club Haïtien before moving to Miami FC at the start of the 2007 season. He returned to Haiti in 2008, Racing Club Haïtien. In 2011, Fenelon played with Panellinios in the Ligue de Soccer Elite Quebec and joined FC Saint-Léonard of the new Première Ligue de soccer du Québec in 2012 with notably ex-Serie A player Sandro Grande.

== International career ==
Fénélon made his debut for Haiti in a March 2003 Gold Cup qualifying match against Jamaica. He won the Caribbean Cup of Nations with Haiti in 2007. He was a squad member at the 2007 Gold Cup Finals Fénélon played for the Canada national futsal team at QCSL World Cup 2010.

== Honours ==
- Caribbean Nations Cup (1) : 2007
- PLSQ League Cup (1) : 2015
