= Lakeshore SC =

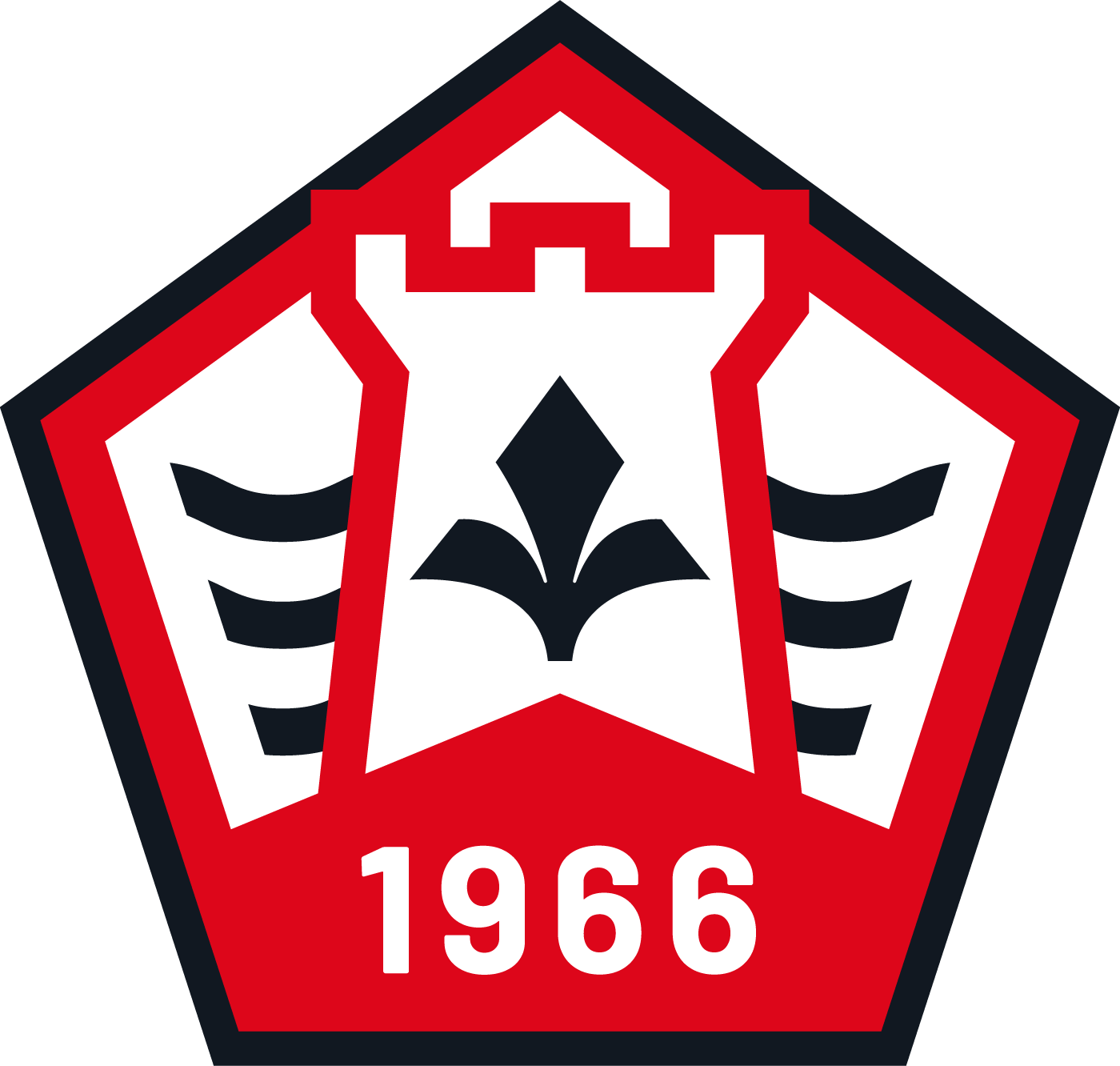
- Full name: Lakeshore Soccer Club
- Founded: 1966
- Stadium: Bénévoles Park
- President: Les Wiseman
- League: Ligue2 Quebec
- 2025: L2Q, 3rd (men); L2Q, 1st (women)
- Website: lakeshoresoccer.ca

Lakeshore Soccer Club is a Canadian semi-professional soccer club based in the Montreal suburb of Kirkland, Quebec. The club competes in the Ligue2 Quebec, returning to the semi-pro league system in 2025 after previously competing in the Première Ligue de soccer du Québec from 2015 to 2016.

== History ==
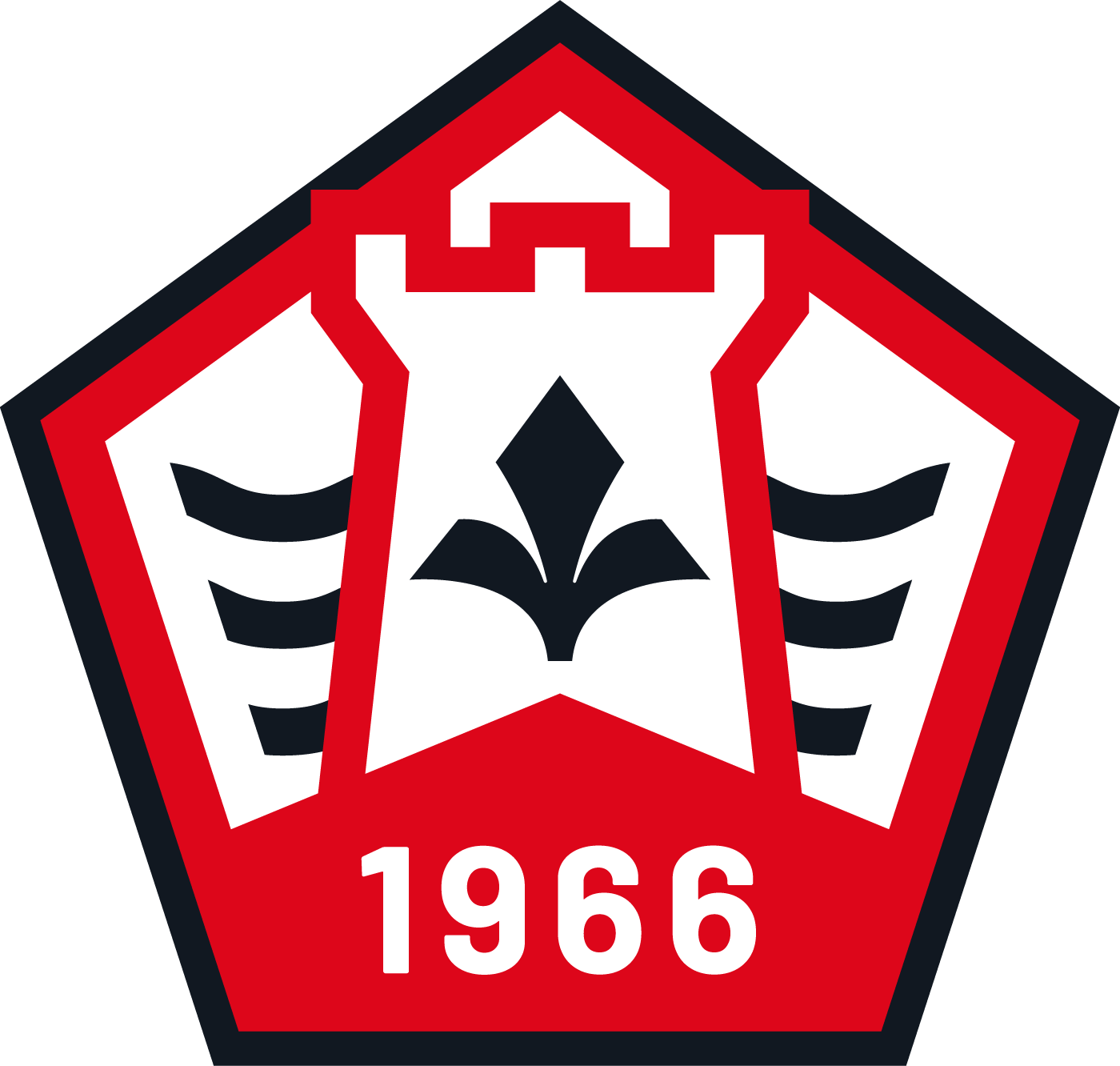
original club logo

The club was originally founded in 1966.

The club was originally set to join the Première Ligue de soccer du Québec for the 2012 season as one of the founding members, although that did not occur.

They eventually joined the PLSQ for the 2015 season. They had a successful inaugural season, finishing in second place in the league, one point behind champions CS Mont-Royal Outremont, while also winning the League Cup, defeating Mont-Royal 4–2 in extra time.

They did not return to the league for the 2017 season due to administrative constraints.

== Club culture ==
=== Club crest ===
Lakeshore Soccer Club commissioned a redesigned crest for 2025 to bring its five historic boroughs under a single, more contemporary visual identity. The designers sought to balance heritage with modern ambition, drawing on the coats of arms of Baie d'Urfé, Senneville, Sainte-Anne-de-Bellevue, Kirkland, and Beaconsfield. The final emblem features a pentagon shield to represent the five municipalities, three waves referencing the region's interconnected waterways, a castle tower reflecting shared heraldic elements and the strategic nature of football, the club's 1966 foundation date to signal longevity, and a fleur de lys to anchor the design in Quebec's cultural tradition. The result is presented as a unified symbol intended to express community pride and the club's forward momentum.

== Seasons ==
Season	League	Teams	Record	Rank	League Cup	Ref
2015	Première Ligue de soccer du Québec	7	10–5–3	2nd	Champions	
2016	Première Ligue de soccer du Québec	6	7–6–5	3rd	Semi-finals	
2017–2024	on hiatus					
2025	Ligue2 Québec	24	16–4–3	3rd	–	

Women

Season	League	Teams	Record	Rank	Playoffs	League Cup	Ref
2025	Ligue2 Québec	19	16–1–1	Champions	–	–	

== Notable former players ==
The following players have either played at the professional or international level, either before or after playing for the PLSQ team:

- (Canada) Jonathan Beaulieu-Bourgault
- (Mauritius) Kevin Chan-Yu-Tin
- (Haiti) Gabard Fénélon

== Honours ==
Première Ligue de soccer du Québec

- PLSQ League Cup (1): 2015
- L2FQC League (1): 2025
