= 2019 Première ligue de soccer du Québec season =

Première ligue de soccer du Québec Men's Division
- Season: 2019
- Champions: A.S. Blainville
- Cup champions: CS Fabrose
- Matches: 72
- Goals: 259 (3.6 per match)
- Top goalscorer: Felipe Costa de Souza (13) (CS Fabrose)

The 2019 Première ligue de soccer du Québec season was the eighth season of play for the Première ligue de soccer du Québec, a Division 3 semi-professional soccer league in the Canadian soccer pyramid and the highest level of soccer based in the Canadian province of Québec.

A.S. Blainville was the defending champion for the men's division from 2018 and once again won the title for the third consecutive season.

== Changes from 2018 ==
For the first time, the league will have nine teams in the men's division. CS Monteuil will begin their first season in the league, after previously having a female team the prior year.

== Teams ==
The following nine teams will take part in the 2019 season:

Team	City	Stadium	Founded	Joined	Head coach
Current teams
A.S. Blainville	Blainville, Laurentides	Parc Blainville	1986	2012	(France) Emmanuel Macagno
Dynamo de Quebec	Quebec City, Capitale-Nationale	Polyvalente L'Ancienne-Lorette	1991	2017	(France) Edmond Foyé
FC Gatineau	Gatineau, Outaouais	Terrain Mont-Bleu	2013	2013	(France) Sylver Castagnet
FC Lanaudière	Terrebonne, Lanaudière	Multiple venues	2016	2016	(Canada) Andrew Olivieri
CS Longueuil	Longueuil, Montérégie	Parc Laurier	1970	2014	(France) Anthony Rimasson
CS Mont-Royal Outremont	Mount Royal, Montréal	Parc Recreatif de TMR	?	2013	(Canada) Luc Brutus
CS Monteuil	Laval, Laval	Centre Sportif Bois-de-Boulogne	1968	2019	(Canada) David Cerasuolo
CS St-Hubert	Saint-Hubert, Montérégie	Centre Sportif Roseanne-Laflamme	1980	2017	(France) François Bourgeais
CS Fabrose	Laval, Laval	Parc Cartier	1971	2018	(France) Josy Madelonet

== Standings ==
Pos	Team	Pld	W	D	L	GF	GA	GD	Pts	Qualification
1	A.S. Blainville (C)	16	11	4	1	43	12	+31	37	2021 Canadian Championship (Note: Due to the revised format of the 2020 Canadian Championship due to the COVID-19 pandemic, the PLSQ champion would instead qualify for the 2021 edition.)
2	CS Mont-Royal Outremont	16	11	4	1	41	12	+29	37	
3	Dynamo de Québec	16	7	6	3	31	23	+8	27	
4	CS Fabrose	16	7	5	4	30	21	+9	26	
5	CS St-Hubert	16	7	3	6	25	25	0	24	
6	CS Monteuil	16	6	6	4	27	23	+4	24	
7	FC Lanaudière	16	3	2	11	27	51	−24	11	
8	CS Longueuil	16	2	4	10	23	45	−22	10	
9	FC Gatineau	16	0	2	14	12	47	−35	2	

Source: PLSQ
(C) Champions

=== Top scorers ===
Rank	Player	Club	Goals
1	Felipe Costa De Souza	CS Fabrose	13
2	Pierre-Rudolph Mayard	AS Blainville	11
2	Adama Sissoko	CS Mont-Royal Outremont	11
4	Mohamed Diallo	CS Monteuil	10
4	Bonano Beugre Gnenago	Dynamo de Québec	10
4	Mouad Ouzane	CS Mont-Royal Outremont	10
7	Samuel Georget	Dynamo de Québec	7
8	Gabriel Wiethaeuper-Balbinotti	FC Lanaudière	6
8	Nazim Belguendouz	CS Mont-Royal Outremont	6
8	Hugo Chambon	AS Blainville	6

=== Awards ===
Award	Player (club)	Ref
Ballon d'or (Best Player)	Bonano Gnenago (Dynamo de Québec)	
Ballon d'argent (2nd Best Player)	Yvenson André (CS Saint-Hubert)	
Ballon de bronze (3rd Best Player)	Pierre-Rudolph Mayard (AS Blainville)	
Golden Boot (Top Scorer)	Felipe Costa de Souza (CS Fabrose)	
Coach of the Year	Antoine Katako (CS Fabrose)	
Coupe PLSQ MVP	Nehemis Kenguena Sana (CS Fabrose)	

== League Cup ==
The cup tournament is a separate contest from the rest of the season, in which all nine teams from the league take part, and is unrelated to the season standings. It is not a form of playoffs at the end of the season (as is typically seen in North American sports), but is a competition running in parallel to the regular season (similar to the Canadian Championship or the FA Cup), albeit only for PLSQ teams. All matches are separate from the regular season, and are not reflected in the season standings.

In a change from previous seasons, it will begin with a group stage featuring three group of three teams each. The top team in each group, as well as the best second-place finisher will advance to the knockout round.

=== Group stage ===
Group A

Pos	Team	Pld	W	D	L	GF	GA	GD	Pts	Qualification
1	CS Mont-Royal Outremont	2	1	1	0	2	0	+2	4	Advance to knockout stage
2	CS Monteuil	2	1	0	1	3	2	+1	3	
3	FC Lanaudière	2	0	1	1	0	3	−3	1	

Source: PLSQ

Group B

Pos	Team	Pld	W	D	L	GF	GA	GD	Pts	Qualification
1	A.S. Blainville	2	1	1	0	3	2	+1	4	Advance to knockout stage
2	Dynamo de Québec	2	1	0	1	4	2	+2	3	
3	FC Gatineau	2	0	1	1	1	4	−3	1	

Source: PLSQ

Group C

Pos	Team	Pld	W	D	L	GF	GA	GD	Pts	Qualification
1	CS Fabrose	2	1	1	0	4	1	+3	4	Advance to knockout stage
2	CS Saint-Hubert	2	1	1	0	4	2	+2	4	Advance to knockout stage
3	CS Longueuil	2	0	0	2	1	6	−5	0	

Source: PLSQ

Ranking of second place teams

Pos	Team	Pld	W	D	L	GF	GA	GD	Pts	Qualification
1	CS Saint-Hubert	2	1	1	0	4	2	+2	4	Advance to knockout stage
2	Dynamo de Québec	2	1	0	1	4	2	+2	3	
3	CS Monteuil	2	1	0	1	3	2	+1	3	

=== Knockout Round ===
Semifinals
A.S. Blainville	1 (3)
CS Fabrose	1 (4)
CS Mont-Royal Outremont	6
CS Saint-Hubert	2

Final
CS Fabrose	2
CS Mont-Royal Outremont	0

== Reserve Division ==
The league operated a reserve division.

Pos	Team	Pld	W	D	L	GF	GA	GD	Pts
1	CS Monteuil Reserves	16	13	1	2	51	20	+31	40
2	A.S. Blainville Reserves	16	8	4	4	36	30	+6	28
3	CS Mont-Royal Outremont Reserves	16	9	1	6	37	30	+7	28
4	FC Lanaudière Reserves	16	8	2	6	33	35	−2	26
5	CS St-Hubert Reserves	16	8	2	6	57	41	+16	26
6	CS Fabrose Reserves	16	7	2	7	41	34	+7	23
7	CS Longueuil Reserves	16	7	1	8	38	40	−2	22
8	Dynamo de Quebec Reserves	16	3	1	12	18	54	−36	10
9	FC Gatineau Reserves	16	1	2	13	22	49	−27	5

Source: TSI Sports

=== Awards ===
Award	Player (club)	Ref
Ballon d'or (Best Player)	Charles-David Martel (CS St-Hubert Reserves)	
Ballon d'argent (2nd Best Player)	Jean de Dieu Mbuyi Ngoyi (CS Monteuil Reserves)	
Ballon de bronze (3rd Best Player)	Sidiki Kone (FC Gatineau Reserves)	
Golden Boot (Top Scorer)	Charles-David Martel (CS St-Hubert Reserves)	
