= Andrew Olivieri =

Canadian retired soccer player (born 1981)

- Olivieri in 2008

Personal information
- Full name: Andrew Olivieri
- Date of birth: March 27, 1981 (age 45)
- Place of birth: Montreal, Quebec, Canada
- Position: Goalkeeper

Youth career
- 1987–1995: Montreal-Nord
- 1995–1999: Jean-Talon Rosemont

College career
Years	Team	Apps	(Gls)
1999–2002	Southern Connecticut	73	(0)

Senior career*
Years	Team	Apps	(Gls)
2001–2003	Vermont Voltage	15	(0)
2003–2005	Montreal Impact	8	(0)
2006	Laval Dynamites	9	(0)
2007–2009	Trois-Rivières Attak	23	(0)

International career^{‡}
2002–2003	Canada U23	7	(0)

Managerial career
- 2004–2011: ARS Lac St-Louis (technical director)
- 2009: Lakers du Lac St-Louis
- 2007–2009: McGill University (assistant)
- 2010–2011: Canada (GK coach)
- 2011–2014: Canada (women) (assistant)
- 2012–2014: Canada (women's U20)
- 2016–2017: FC Lanaudière
- 2018–: Canada U20
- * Club domestic league appearances and goals as of November 6, 2018 ‡ National team caps and goals as of November 6, 2018

Andrew Olivieri (born March 27, 1981) is a Canadian professional football manager and former soccer player who is currently the head coach of the Canadian men's under-20 team. He played as a goalkeeper for several clubs in the United States and Canada, namely Vermont Voltage, Montreal Impact, Laval Dynamites and Trois-Rivieres Attack.

== Early life ==
Olivieri began playing amateur soccer with his home town of Montreal-Nord from 1987 to 1995. At which point he took his talent to Jean-Talon Rosemont in the Ligue de Soccer Elite Quebec, where he played from 1995 to 1999. During that period, he was a member of the Quebec teams. During his time with Jean-Talon Rosemont he was named into the LSEQ all-star team from 1996 to 1999 and was named the goalkeeper of the year in 1996 and 1998. He won numerous Canadian championships with the Quebec teams and conceded only 2 goals in five consecutive years of national championships from 1995 to 1999.

== College career ==
From 1999 he went on to play college soccer with Southern Connecticut State University, where he was a four-year starter and named into the conference and region all-star teams each year. His freshman year was the most memorable as he led SCSU to an NCAA National Championship and only the second ever perfect season recorded in NCAA history with a 20-0-0 record. To go with their 20 wins, Olivieri recorded 15 shutouts and led the nation with the best goals against average (0.25). His four-year total was an impressive 45 shut-outs in 73 games.

== Club career ==
=== Vermont Voltage ===
Between 2001 until 2003 he played for the Vermont Voltage of the PDL, with Vermont he won the PDL New England conference in 2002 and 2003.

=== Montreal Impact ===
In 2003, he was the first overall draft pick of the Montreal Impact of the USL A-League. With the Impact he won the regular-season title from 2003 to 2005, and the League Championship in 2004. He also won the Voyageurs Cup from 2003 to 2005.

=== Laval Dynamites ===
Throughout his time with Montreal he mostly played as a back-up for Greg Sutton, which led him to sign with the Laval Dynamites of the Canadian Soccer League. He featured in the postseason match against Toronto Croatia, where Laval were eliminated from the competition by a score of 1-0.

=== Trois-Rivières Attak ===
As his contract expired with the Impact, Olivieri signed with expansion team the Trois-Rivières Attak for the 2007 CSL season. He made his debut on May 3 against Toronto Croatia, where the game resulted in a 0-0 tie. Unfortunately he sustained a leg injury and was forced to miss out the remainder of the season. On April 24, 2008 Olivieri renewed his contract with the Attak. After fully recovering from his injury Olivieri played a career high season where he helped the Attak win the National Division, and allowed the fewest goals with only 12 goals conceded in 22 games. In the playoff run he recorded two shutouts in the quarter and semi-final games against St. Catharines Wolves and Portugal FC. On October 26, 2008 during the on-field awards ceremony before the CSL Championship final game against Serbian White Eagles, he was awarded the Goalkeeper of the Year award. But unfortunately the Attak were yet again defeated by the White Eagles where the game resulted in a 2-2 draw, but after extra time the game went into penalty kicks. During the kicks Olivieri saved three shots and even scored a goal, but teammate Davy Uwimana missed the final kick which resulted in 2-1 defeat on Penalty kicks.

== International career ==
Between September 2003 and March 2004, he enjoyed his best moments with the Canada's U23 national team while taking part in the 2004 CONCACAF Men's Pre-Olympic Tournament. As Canada's first choice goalkeeper, he helped the canucks through the preliminary rounds, beating the US Virgin Islands and El Salvador in a home and away series. The ladder requiring an exciting return leg where Canada won 1-0 to tie the aggregate score and then secured a trip to Guadalajara, Mexico through a shootout. Although Canada did not secure a spot in the 2004 Summer Olympics, Olivieri shined in the final round of qualifying and was honored on the tournament all-star team. His performances earned him a call-up to the senior team earlier that year for an international friendly in Barbados where Canada won 1-0.

== Managerial career ==
=== ARS Lac St-Louis ===
In 2004, Olivieri began his coaching career while still playing for the Montreal Impact of the USL. He was hired as the assistant to the technical director for the Lac St-Louis regional soccer association. A region, which encompasses 15 clubs, 28,000 players, within the greater Montreal area. Over time, Olivieri was promoted to Technical Director and led the development of the region's most promising players and coaches. In addition to coaching all aspects of the region's development programs, he led the region's flagship club in 2010, the Lakers du Lac Saint-Louis, to the U18M national championships during the club's last year of historical existence as Canada's all-time winningest club.

=== Provincial and National Teams ===
During his time with ARS Lac St-Louis, Olivieri also served on a number of Quebec Provincial Team staff's in a variety of technical roles from assistant to goalkeeper coach. Contributing to 3 gold medals, 2 silver and a bronze medal in the Canadian National All-Star Championships between 2005 and 2010.

In 2010-2011, Olivieri also served in a similar role for the Canadian National men's and men's Olympic team under Stephen Hart and Tony Fonseca.

=== McGill University ===
During the 2007 and 2008 seasons, Olivieri served on staff of the McGill University women's team under head coach Marc Mounicot.

=== Canadian Soccer Association ===
In January 2012, the Canadian Soccer Association officially hired Olivieri as the Women's Excel Director for national team players between the ages of 18 and 23. In this role, Olivieri collaborated in the restructuring of the development pathway for the countries elite players. He continues in the identifying, monitoring and developing process for elite players between the ages of 18-23 while also serving as head coach of the U20 Women's National Team and assistant coach of the Women's National team. As a member of the Women's Excel Program, Olivieri has led Canada during both the 2012 and 2014 FIFA Women's World Cups in Japan and Canada respectively. He has also contributed to Canada's Pan American Games gold medal in Guadalajara 2011 and Olympic bronze medal in London 2012.

=== FC Lanaudière ===
In February 2016, Olivieri was announced as the first head coach of FC Lanaudière in the PLSQ.

=== Canadian Soccer Association ===
In July 2018, the Canadian Soccer Association announced Olivieri as the Men’s EXCEL U-20 Program Director.
