= 2018 Première ligue de soccer du Québec season =

Première ligue de soccer du Québec Men's Division
- Season: 2018
- Champions: AS Blainville (men's)
- Cup champions: FC Lanaudière
- Matches: 84
- Goals: 205 (2.44 per match)
- Top goalscorer: Pierre-Rudolph Mayard (19) (AS Blainville)

The 2018 Première ligue de soccer du Québec season was the seventh season of play for the Première ligue de soccer du Québec, a Division 3 semi-professional soccer league in the Canadian soccer pyramid and the highest level of soccer based in the Canadian province of Québec.

AS Blainville was the defending champion and won the title again this season.

== Changes from 2017 ==
For the first time, the league had eight teams, with CS Fabrose beginning their first season in the league.

Also this year, a new women's division was started with their debut season.

== Teams ==
The following eight teams took part in the 2018 season:

| Team | City | Stadium | Founded | Joined | Head coach |
Current teams
| AS Blainville | Blainville, Laurentides | Parc Blainville | 1986 | 2012 | (France) Emmanuel Macagno |
| Dynamo de Quebec | Quebec City, Capitale-Nationale | Polyvalente L'Ancienne-Lorette | 1991 | 2017 | (France) Edmond Foyé |
| FC Gatineau | Gatineau, Outaouais | Terrain Mont-Bleu | 2013 | 2013 | (France) Sylver Castagnet |
| FC Lanaudière | Terrebonne, Lanaudière | Multiple venues | 2016 | 2016 | (Canada) Andrew Olivieri |
| CS Longueuil | Longueuil, Montérégie | Parc Laurier | 1970 | 2014 | (France) Anthony Rimasson |
| CS Mont-Royal Outremont | Mount Royal, Montréal | Parc Recreatif de TMR | ? | 2013 | (Canada) Luc Brutus |
| CS St-Hubert | Saint-Hubert, Montérégie | Centre Sportif Roseanne-Laflamme | 1980 | 2017 | (France) François Bourgeais |
| CS Fabrose | Laval, Laval | Parc Cartier | 1971 | 2018 | (France) Josy Madelonet |

Locations of teams for the 2018 PLSQ season.

== Standings ==
| Pos | Team | Pld | W | D | L | GF | GA | GD | Pts | Qualification |
|---|---|---|---|---|---|---|---|---|---|---|
| 1 | AS Blainville (C) | 21 | 16 | 3 | 2 | 42 | 14 | +28 | 51 | 2019 Canadian Championship |
| 2 | CS Mont-Royal Outremont | 21 | 14 | 3 | 4 | 33 | 15 | +18 | 45 | |
| 3 | FC Gatineau | 21 | 9 | 5 | 7 | 28 | 21 | +7 | 32 | |
| 4 | CS Longueuil | 21 | 7 | 8 | 6 | 20 | 22 | −2 | 29 | |
| 5 | Dynamo de Québec | 21 | 7 | 6 | 8 | 25 | 28 | −3 | 27 | |
| 6 | CS St-Hubert | 21 | 6 | 4 | 11 | 26 | 36 | −10 | 22 | |
| 7 | CS Fabrose | 21 | 3 | 6 | 12 | 19 | 31 | −12 | 15 | |
| 8 | FC Lanaudière | 21 | 2 | 5 | 14 | 12 | 38 | −26 | 11 | |

Source: TSI Sports
(C) Champions

=== Top scorers ===
| Rank | Player | Club | Goals |
|---|---|---|---|
| 1 | (Canada) Pierre-Rudolph Mayard | AS Blainville | 19 |
| 2 | (Canada) Stefan Karajovanovic | FC Gatineau | 14 |
| 3 | (Canada) Bastien Aussems | Dynamo de Québec | 6 |
| 3 | (Canada) Sean Rosa | CS Mont-Royal Outremont | 6 |
| 3 | (Canada) Ludwig Kodjo Amla | CS St-Hubert | 6 |

=== Awards ===
| Award | Player (club) | Ref |
|---|---|---|
| Ballon d'or (Best Player) | Pierre-Rudolph Mayard (AS Blainville) | |
| Ballon d'argent (2nd Best Player) | Yvenson André (CS Saint-Hubert) | |
| Ballon de bronze (3rd Best Player) | Stefan Karajovanovic (FC Gatineau) | |
| Golden Boot (Top Scorer) | Pierre-Rudolph Mayard (AS Blainville) | |
| Coach of the Year | Emmanuel Macagno (AS Blainville) | |

== League Cup ==
The cup tournament is a separate contest from the rest of the season, in which all eight teams from the league take part, and is unrelated to the season standings. It is not a form of playoffs at the end of the season (as is typically seen in North American sports), but is a competition running in parallel to the regular season (similar to the Canadian Championship or the FA Cup), albeit only for PLSQ teams. All matches are separate from the regular season, and are not reflected in the season standings.

In a change from previous seasons, all ties were played on a single match basis. Due to the expansion of the league to 8 teams, all clubs began in the first round.

Quarterfinals
AS Blainville | 0
FC Gatineau | 1
CS St-Hubert | 2
CS Mont-Royal Outremont | 1
FC Lanaudière | 1 (5)
CS Longueuil | 1 (4)
CS Fabrose | 0
Dynamo de Québec | 3

Semifinals
FC Gatineau | 1
CS St-Hubert | 0
FC Lanaudière | 3
Dynamo de Québec | 0

Final
FC Gatineau | 1 (3)
FC Lanaudière | 1 (4)

== Reserve Division ==
The league operated a reserve division.

| Pos | Team | Pld | W | D | L | GF | GA | GD | Pts |
|---|---|---|---|---|---|---|---|---|---|
| 1 | AS Blainville Reserves | 14 | 11 | 0 | 3 | 39 | 21 | +18 | 33 |
| 2 | CS Mont-Royal Outremont Reserves | 14 | 7 | 3 | 4 | 28 | 18 | +10 | 24 |
| 3 | FC Lanaudière Reserves | 14 | 7 | 3 | 4 | 35 | 24 | +11 | 24 |
| 4 | CS Fabrose Reserves | 14 | 6 | 2 | 6 | 22 | 27 | −5 | 20 |
| 5 | CS Longueuil Reserves | 14 | 6 | 1 | 7 | 28 | 28 | 0 | 19 |
| 6 | CS St-Hubert Reserves | 14 | 4 | 5 | 5 | 29 | 32 | −3 | 17 |
| 7 | Dynamo de Quebec Reserves | 14 | 3 | 3 | 8 | 18 | 41 | −23 | 12 |
| 8 | FC Gatineau Reserves | 14 | 2 | 3 | 9 | 23 | 31 | −8 | 9 |

Source: TSI Sports

=== Awards ===
| Award | Player (club) | Ref |
|---|---|---|
| Ballon d'or (Best Player) | Juan Pablo Munoz (CS Mont-Royal Outremont Reserves) | |
| Ballon d'argent (2nd Best Player) | Alexandre Proulx (FC Lanaudière Reserves) | |
| Ballon de bronze (3rd Best Player) | Alex Pierre Torchon (CS Longueuil Reserves) | |
| Golden Boot (Top Scorer) | Juan Pablo Munoz (CS Mont-Royal Outremont Reserves); Alexandre Proulx (FC Lanaudière Reserves) | |
