= CS Longueuil =

Canadian semi-professional soccer club

- Full name: Club Soccer Longueuil
- Founded: 1970
- Stadium: Centre Multi-Sport
- President: Stéphane Lamothe
- League: Ligue1 Québec
- 2025: L1Q, 10th (men); L1Q, 6th (women)
- Website: http://www.soccerlongueuil.com
Home colours

Club Soccer Longueuil is a Canadian semi-professional soccer club based in Longueuil, Quebec. Since 2014, the club has competed in Ligue1 Québec.

== History ==
The club was originally founded in 1970. In 2014, the club joined the Première Ligue de soccer du Québec, a Division III league, fielding a team in the men's division. They had a successful debut season, winning the league championship and advancing to the final of the League Cup, where they lost in the final to FC Gatineau. By winning the league title, they participated in the first Inter-Provincial Cup against the champion of League1 Ontario to determine the Canadian Division III champion, in 2014. In the Inter-Provincial Cup, in 2014, they faced League1 Ontario champions Toronto FC Academy, who defeated them over the two-legged fixture, losing the first leg at home 4-0 to TFCA and drawing the second leg away 0-0. By 2016, however, their budget was slashed in half, requiring them to field rosters with a greater number of young players.

In 2020, they had decided to add a team in the women's division of the Première Ligue de soccer du Québec. However, the 2020 season was postponed due to the COVID-19 pandemic. While some clubs opted out of the season upon the league restart, the club decided to remain part of the league and compete.

In 2025, they entered a B team in Ligue3 Quebec, capturing the league title in their sole season, as B teams were removed the following year.

== Seasons ==
Men

Season	League	Teams	Record	Rank	League Cup	Inter-Provincial Cup	Ref
2014	Première Ligue de soccer du Québec	6	10–9–1	Champions	Finalists	Lost	
2015	Première Ligue de soccer du Québec	7	7–5–6	4th	Quarter-final	did not qualify	
2016	Première Ligue de soccer du Québec	7	4–5–9	5th	Quarter-final	did not qualify	
2017	Première Ligue de soccer du Québec	7	6–9–3	3rd	Semi-final	–	
2018	Première Ligue de soccer du Québec	8	7–8–6	4th	Quarter-final	–	
2019	Première Ligue de soccer du Québec	9	2–4–10	8th	Group Stage	–	
2020 (Note: The 2020 season was cancelled before its conclusion, with the final standings determined on a points earned per game basis)	Première Ligue de soccer du Québec	6	2–0–5	5th	–	–	
2021	Première Ligue de soccer du Québec	10 (Note: Ottawa South United withdrew from the 2021 league mid-way through due to government restrictions, with their matches removed from the standings. Thus, Longueuil's victory against Ottawa is not included in their record.)	7–2–7	6th	–	–	
2022	Première Ligue de soccer du Québec	12	12–2–8	5th	did not qualify	–	
2023	Ligue1 Québec	12	7–5–10	8th	First Round	–	
2024	Ligue1 Québec	11	6–6–8	7th	Quarter-finals	–	
2025	Ligue1 Québec	10	4–4–10	10th	did not qualify	–	

Women

Season	League	Teams	Record	Rank	Playoffs	League Cup	Ref
2020	Première Ligue de soccer du Québec	4	1–0–2	3rd	3rd	–	
2021	Première Ligue de soccer du Québec	10	0–2–7	10th	–	did not qualify	
2022	Première Ligue de soccer du Québec	12	3–4–4	9th	–	did not qualify	
2023	Ligue1 Québec	12	1–4–5	11th	–	First Round	
2024	Ligue1 Québec	12	6–1–9	4th, Group B (9th overall)	did not qualify	–	
2025	Ligue1 Québec	10	7–1–5	3rd, Group A (6th overall)	did not qualify	–	

== Notable former players ==
The following players have either played at the professional or international level, either before or after playing for the PLSQ team:

=== Men ===
- (Canada) Zakaria Bahous
- (Cameroon) Gilbert Bayiha N'Djema
- (France) André Bona
- (Guinea) (Canada) Mamadi Camara
- (Saint Vincent and the Grenadines) Lemus Christopher
- (Canada) Philippe Davies
- (Canada) Mohamed Farsi
- (Cameroon) Armand Ken Ella
- (Canada) Pierre Lamothe
- (Canada) Frederico Moojen
- (Canada) Protais Mutambala
- (Mali) Aboubacar Sissoko

=== Women ===
- (Canada) Mara Bouchard
- (Canada) Marika Guay
- (Canada) Sophie Guilmette
- (Guyana) (Canada) Stefani Kouzas
- (Canada) Karima Lemire

== Honours ==
Première Ligue de soccer du Québec

- PLSQ Championship: 2014
