= Inter-Provincial Cup (soccer) =

Canadian soccer competition

- Organiser(s): Canadian Soccer Association
- Founded: 2014
- Abolished: 2016
- Region: Central Canada (Ontario, Quebec)
- Teams: 2
- Most championships: League1 Ontario champions (2 titles)

The Inter-Provincial Cup was a soccer super cup organized by the Canadian Soccer Association. It was contested between the men's champions of the Première ligue de soccer du Québec and League1 Ontario, Canada's only domestic Division 3 soccer leagues. The competition was held annually from 2014 to 2016.

The 2017 edition was cancelled when it was announced that the champions of the two leagues would play against each other in the 2018 Canadian Championship. From the 2019 Canadian Championship onward, a draw takes place in which the PLSQ and L1O entrant cannot be drawn against each other in the first round. However, it is possible that they could play each other in further rounds.

== Results ==
Year	PLSQ team	Aggregate	L1O team	Leg 1	Venue 1	Leg 2	Venue 2
2014	CS Longueuil	0–4	Toronto FC Academy	0–4	Bell Sports Complex; Brossard, Quebec	0–0	Pickering Soccer Complex; Pickering, Ontario
2015	CS Mont-Royal Outremont	3–5	Oakville Blue Devils	1–3	Ontario Soccer Centre; Vaughan, Ontario	2–2	Complexes Sportifs Terrebone; Quebec, Quebec
2016	CS Mont-Royal Outremont	3–2	Vaughan Azzurri	1–1	Complexes Sportifs Terrebone; Quebec, Quebec	2–1	Pickering Soccer Centre; Pickering, Ontario

=== Canadian Championship matchups ===
Year	PLSQ team	Aggregate	L1O team	Leg 1	Venue 1	Leg 2	Venue 2
2018	A.S. Blainville	3–1	Oakville Blue Devils	2–1	Stade Desjardins, Laval, Quebec	1–0	Ontario Soccer Centre, Vaughan, Ontario
