= FC Gatineau =

Sports club in Quebec, Canada

- Full name: Football Club Gatineau
- Founded: 1979
- Stadium: Mont-Bleu; Gatineau, Québec
- President: Stéphane Racine
- Technical Director: Antony Ramel
- Website: http://www.fcgatineau.ca
Home colours

Football Club Gatineau was a Canadian semi-professional soccer club based in Gatineau, Quebec that played in the Première Ligue de soccer du Québec until the 2019 season. It currently concentrates its activities on regional development of players.

== History ==
The club was founded in 1979 under the name Association de Soccer de Hull. Their home field is located at the Mont-Bleu Sports Complex.

Logo originally used when club began play in the PLSQ

In 2013, the club joined the Première Ligue de soccer du Québec, a Division III league, fielding a team in the men's division. In 2014, Gatineau won the League Cup, defeating CS Longueuil 1-0 in the final. They finished as the runner-up for the League Cup for three consecutive seasons in 2016, 2017, and 2018. After a strong 2018 season in which they finished third in the league, they had a disastrous 2019 season, finishing in last place and failing to record a single victory. They left the PLSQ after the 2019 season, after being unable to meet the financial requirements of the league. They instead decided to join the Ontario-based Ottawa-Carlton Soccer League.

In 2016, they became a partner club of the Montreal Impact and in 2017, control of FC Gatineau was transferred from the Outaouais Regional Soccer Association to local club AS Hull (now renamed FC Gatineau as a whole). In 2017, the club played a friendly against the Haiti U20 national team. In 2020, a potential merger between FC Gatineau and CS Aylmer was in the works.

In March 2025, the club became an affiliate club of Canadian Premier League side Atlético Ottawa.

== Seasons ==
Season	League	Teams	Record	Rank	League Cup	Ref
2013	Première Ligue de soccer du Québec	7	8–2–8	4th	Group Stage	
2014	Première Ligue de soccer du Québec	6	8–9–3	2nd	Champions	
2015	Première Ligue de soccer du Québec	7	4–3–11	7th	Semi-finals	
2016	Première Ligue de soccer du Québec	7	6–4–8	4th	Finalists	
2017	Première Ligue de soccer du Québec	7	3–4–11	7th	Finalists	
2018	Première Ligue de soccer du Québec	8	9–5–7	3rd	Finalists	
2019	Première Ligue de soccer du Québec	9	0–2–14	9th	Group Stage	

== Notable former players ==
The following players have either played at the professional or international level, either before or after playing for the PLSQ team:

- (Guyana) Julien Edwards
- (Canada) Emad Houache
- (Canada) Stefan Karajovanovic
- (United States) (Canada) Anthony Legendre
- (Ivory Coast) Kouamé Ouattara
- (Ivory Coast) Yann Toualy
- (Canada) Jonathan Vallée

== Honours ==
Première Ligue de soccer du Québec

- Coupe PLSQ: 2014
