= 2020 Première ligue de soccer du Québec season =

Première ligue de soccer du Québec Men's Division
- Season: 2020
- Champions: AS Blainville
- Cup champions: Not Held
- Matches: 22 of 30 completed
- Top goalscorer: Samuel Salter (8) (AS Blainville)

The 2020 Première ligue de soccer du Québec season is the ninth season of play for the Première ligue de soccer du Québec, a Division 3 semi-professional soccer league in the Canadian soccer pyramid and the highest level of soccer based in the Canadian province of Québec. The start date of the season was postponed due to the COVID-19 pandemic, resulting in a modified schedule and season.

On 29 September, following new directives from the Government of Quebec in regards to the second wave of the COVID-19 pandemic, the Quebec Soccer Federation announced that the remainder of the male PLSQ season was cancelled immediately with remaining matches not being played and the final standings to be determined based on points earned per game up to that date.

A.S. Blainville was the defending champion. A.S. Blainville won the men's division for the fourth consecutive season and also won their first women's division title.

== Changes from 2019 and Changes due to pandemic ==
The 2020 season was originally set to begin on 2 May 2020. The men's division was set to have nine teams for the second consecutive season. Dynamo de Québec and FC Gatineau withdrew from the league following the 2018 season, while Celtix du Haut-Richelieu and former League1 Ontario club Ottawa South United joined the league. However, the COVID-19 pandemic forced the start of the season to be delayed. Ultimately, a shortened season featuring six of the nine teams was announced to start on 1 August and end on 3 October (later changed to 11 October). FC Lanaudière, CS Mont-Royal Outremont, and CS Monteuil opted out of the restart. Due to the pandemic, clubs who opted out would not be penalized. The winner of this season will not earn a spot in the 2021 Canadian Championship as the 2019 champion, A.S. Blainville will participate due to their removal from the 2020 competition, due to the COVID-19 pandemic. Three matches (two senior and one reserve) were forced to be postponed on 20 September due to a COVID-19 situation. Another three matches (two senior and one reserve) were postponed the following week as well. The remainder of the male season was cancelled on 29 September, with the standings to be decided on points earned per game.

== Teams ==
Nine team were set to initially participate, however, three teams withdrew due to the COVID-19 pandemic. The six remaining teams were to play a shortened season from August until mid-October. Each team was to play each other twice (home and away) for a total of 10 games. However, effective 29 September, the remainder of the season was cancelled with immediate effect and remaining matches not to be played with the final standings to be determined based on points earned per game.

Team	City	Stadium	2020 Status	Reserve Division
A.S. Blainville	Blainville, Laurentides	Parc Blainville	Participating	Withdrew
Celtix du Haut-Richelieu	Saint-Jean-sur-Richelieu, Montérégie	Stade Alphonse-Desjardins	Participating	Participating
CS Fabrose	Laval, Laval	Parc Cartier	Participating	Withdrew
FC Lanaudière	Terrebonne, Lanaudière	Centre de Soccer Multifonctionnel de Terrebonne	Withdrew	Withdrew
CS Longueuil	Longueuil, Montérégie	Parc Laurier	Participating	Participating
CS Mont-Royal Outremont	Mount Royal, Montréal	Parc Recreatif de TMR	Withdrew	Withdrew
CS Monteuil	Laval, Laval	Centre Sportif Bois-de-Boulogne	Withdrew	Withdrew
CS St-Hubert	Saint-Hubert, Montérégie	Centre Sportif Roseanne-Laflamme	Participating	Participating
Ottawa South United	Ottawa, Ontario	George Nelms Sports Park (Note: Due to COVID-19 restrictions put in place by the Government of Ontario, Ottawa South United played all of their home games at various parks in Quebec rather than at George Nelms Park)	Participating	Participating

== Standings ==
At the end of September, the remainder of the season was cancelled with immediate effect due to the COVID-19 pandemic with remaining matches not to be played with the final standings to be determined based on points earned per game.

Pos	Team	Pld	W	D	L	GF	GA	GD	Pts	PPG
1	A.S. Blainville (C)	8	6	1	1	21	8	+13	19	2.38
2	Ottawa South United	7	4	2	1	17	9	+8	14	2.00
3	Celtix du Haut-Richelieu	8	4	0	4	10	14	−4	12	1.50
4	CS St-Hubert	8	3	1	4	16	22	−6	10	1.25
5	CS Longueuil	7	2	0	5	8	12	−4	6	0.86
6	CS Fabrose	6	1	0	5	8	15	−7	3	0.50

Source: PLSQ
(C) Champions

=== Top scorers ===
Rank	Player	Club	Goals
1	Samuel Salter	AS Blainville	8
2	Stefan Karajovanovic	Ottawa South United	7
3	Charles-David Martel	CS St-Hubert	5
4	Corentin Artaillou	Celtix du Haut-Richelieu	4
4	Gabriel Bitar	Ottawa South United	4
6	Daniel Assaf	Ottawa South United	3
6	Nicolas Bertrand	AS Blainville	3
6	Pierre-Rudolph Mayard	AS Blainville	3

== Reserve Division ==
The league operated a reserve division. Only four of the teams in the main division operated teams in the division, with A.S. Blainville and CS Fabrose choosing not to enter reserve sides. Each team was to play each other twice for a total of 6 matches. However, on 29 September, it was announced that the remainder of the season was cancelled and remaining matches would not be played.

Pos	Team	Pld	W	D	L	GF	GA	GD	Pts	PPG
1	CS Longueuil Reserves	4	3	1	0	17	6	+11	10	2.50
2	CS St-Hubert Reserves	6	3	1	2	23	13	+10	10	1.67
3	Ottawa South United Reserves	4	1	1	2	6	12	−6	4	1.00
4	Celtix du Haut-Richelieu Reserves	4	0	1	3	3	18	−15	1	0.25

Source: TSI Sports
