= LS Pro =

- Organising body: Soccer Quebec
- Founded: August 31, 2011; 15 years ago
- Country: Canada
- Provinces: Quebec (11 teams); Ontario (1 team)
- Confederation: CONCACAF
- Number of clubs: 12 (Ligue1); 12 (Ligue2); 25 (Ligue3)
- Level on pyramid: 3
- Domestic cup: Canadian Championship
- League cup: Coupe du Québec
- Current champions: CS Saint-Laurent (2nd title) (2025)
- Current league cup champions: AS Blainville (4th title) (2025)
- Broadcaster(s): RDS.ca (streaming)
- Website: www.lsproqc.com
- Current: 2026 LS Pro season

The LS Pro (Ligues senior provinciales) is a semi-professional men's soccer league in Quebec, Canada. The league is sanctioned by the Canadian Soccer Association and Soccer Quebec. Founded in 2011 as the Première ligue de soccer du Québec, it re-branded in 2023 to Ligue1 Québec, before eventually adopting the current name in 2025. In 2025, the league expanded and introduced two new divisions Ligue2 Québec and Ligue3 Québec, following the ending of the amateur Ligue de soccer élite du Québec, with the teams being folded into LS Pro. It currently consists of three tiers: Ligue 1, Ligue 2, and Ligue 3.

In the Canadian soccer league system, the men's division is behind the fully-professional Canadian Premier League. It is part of Premier Soccer Leagues Canada, the national third tier with regional divisions, along with four other leagues. The men's league champion qualifies for the Canadian Championship, Canada's domestic cup tournament.

== History ==
=== Background ===
The history of soccer in Quebec dates back to 1884, with the first league established in 1886. In 1911, the Province of Quebec Football Association, now known as the Quebec Soccer Federation was founded. In 1986, a semi-professional league called the Ligue nationale de soccer du Québec (LNSQ) was created, but it merged with different rival leagues to form the Ligue de soccer élite du Québec in 1992. In 1993, five of the former LNSQ clubs Corfinium St-Leonard, Cosmos de LaSalle, Luso Stars Mont-Royal, Montreal Croatia, and Montreal Ramblers joined the Canadian National Soccer League (CNSL) to form the league's Eastern Division. Following this, the amateur Ligue de soccer élite du Québec served as the top level of soccer in the province, although Quebec clubs did play in the United Soccer League (Montreal Impact) and the semi-professional Canadian Soccer League (Laval Dynamites/Trois-Rivières Attak and Montreal Impact Academy).

=== Foundation ===
Original league logo

In 2011, the Première ligue de soccer du Québec was established, marking the return of a semi-professional soccer league to the province for the first time in 20 years. The league was sanctioned by the Canadian Soccer Association as a level 3 league, below Major League Soccer (level 1) and the North American Soccer League and United Soccer League (level 2), which were American-based fully professional leagues featuring some Canadian teams, including the Montreal Impact of the MLS.

The league had its debut season in 2012 with a men's division featuring five teams – A.S. Blainville, FC Brossard, FC Boisbriand, FC L'Assomption, and FC Saint-Léonard. FC Saint-Léonard won the inaugural season. The following season, the league added a league cup to its schedule, the Coupe PLSQ, which would take place annually at the conclusion of the season, unrelated to the results of the regular season. In 2014, the province of Ontario created its own semi-professional level 3 league, League1 Ontario, and the Inter-Provincial Cup was established which would be contested between the champions of each league and ran for three years until 2016. In 2015, the league added its first club from outside of the province of Quebec, with the Ottawa Fury FC Academy joining the league.

Beginning in 2018, the league champion qualified to participate in the Canadian Championship for the following season. In 2018, a women's division was added, starting with five teams. The start of the 2020 season was delayed due to the COVID-19 pandemic, but it ultimately resumed with a shortened season, although some teams opted out of playing for the season. However, the remainder of the men's season was cancelled about three-quarters of the way through the season, due to a resurgence of the pandemic (the female season had already concluded).

In 2022, the PLSQ joined League1 Canada along with League1 Ontario and League1 British Columbia. On April 19, 2023, the league rebranded to Ligue1 Québec to align with its partner leagues. In 2024, it was announced that USL League Two club Vermont Green FC would host the reigning L1Q champion each year in a friendly each year, known as the Maple Cup.

== Competition format ==
Depending on the number of teams in the league, teams play every other team two to four times per season, for a total of between 15 and 20 games. The winner gets the regular season championship. Each team has a minimum of nine paid players and is subject to a salary cap.

=== Coupe L1QC ===
At the end of the year, there was a league cup, called the Coupe L1QC (formerly the Coupe PLSQ), which began in 2013. The format varies each season, depending on the number of teams in the league. The most recent cup competition featured the top eight teams from league play in a single-knockout tournament. In the past, the cup has also used a group stage and knockout format where three groups of three teams were formed, and the winner of each group along with the best second-place finisher advanced to the semi-finals.

=== Coupe du Québec ===
The 2026 season was the first edition of the Coupe du Québec with the teams from Ligue1. Before 2026, the Coupe du Québec was only for teams from Ligue2 and lower divisions. The format had a group phase (13 groups of 4 teams, mostly from same region to reduce the travel) followed by a 32-team knockout phase.

=== Yearly results ===
L1QC Men's trophy winners
Season	Teams	L1QC Champions League winners	Coupe PLSQ Cup winners
2012	5	FC St-Léonard (1)	—
2013	7	CS Mont-Royal Outremont (1)	CS Mont-Royal Outremont
2014	6	CS Longueuil (1)	FC Gatineau
2015	7	CS Mont-Royal Outremont (2)	Lakeshore SC
2016	7	CS Mont-Royal Outremont (3)	A.S. Blainville (1)
2017	7	A.S. Blainville (1)	A.S. Blainville (2)
2018	8	A.S. Blainville (2)	FC Lanaudière
2019	9	A.S. Blainville (3)	CS Fabrose
2020 (Note: The season was cancelled before its conclusion, with the final standings determined on a points earned per game basis)	6 (Note: Originally 9 clubs were set to participate, however, due to the COVID-19 pandemic, three clubs withdrew from the season)	A.S. Blainville (4)	—
2021	10 (Note: Ottawa South United withdrew midway through the season due to provincial government and cross-border restrictions caused by the COVID-19 pandemic, with 9 teams finishing the season)	CS Mont-Royal Outremont (4)	—
2022	12	FC Laval (1)	A.S. Blainville (3)
2023	12	CS St-Laurent (1)	CS St-Laurent (1)
2024	11	FC Laval (2)	CS St-Laurent (2)

LS Pro Men's trophy winners
Season	Ligue1	Coupe L1Q	Ligue2	Ligue3
2025	CS Saint-Laurent (2)	AS Blainville (4)	CS LaSalle	CS Longueuil B
2026				

== Clubs ==
Quebec Ligue1 Quebec Ligue2 Quebec; Ligue3 Quebec Greater Montreal or Quebec City

Montreal Ligue1 Quebec Ligue2 Quebec; Ligue3 Quebec

Quebec City Ligue1 Quebec Ligue2 Quebec; Ligue3 Quebec

Over the course of its history, various clubs have joined and departed the league. A.S. Blainville is the only club to have participated in every season since the league's inception. Blainville has been the most successful club, winning both the league championship and the league cup four times. CS Mont-Royal Outremont has been second-most successful with four league championships and one league cup title.

=== Current clubs ===
==== Ligue 1 Québec ====
The following twelve teams are members of the league for the 2026 season:

Team	City	Stadium	Joined
Current teams
A.S. Blainville	Blainville, Laurentides	Parc Blainville	2012
Celtix du Haut-Richelieu	Saint-Jean-sur-Richelieu, Montérégie	Parc Pierre-Benoît	2020
AS Laval (Note: AS Laval was known as CS Monteuil until the 2021 season)	Laval	Parc de Lausanne	2019
FC Laval (Note: FC Laval was known as CS Fabrose until the 2020 season)	Laval	Parc Berthiaume-Du Tremblay	2018
CS Longueuil	Longueuil, Montérégie	Parc Laurier	2014
CS Mont-Royal Outremont	Mount Royal, Montréal	Parc Recreatif de TMR	2013
CS Saint-Laurent	Montreal	Stade Claude-Robillard	2022
CS St-Hubert	Longueuil, Montérégie	Centre Sportif Roseanne-Laflamme	2017
Ottawa South United	Ottawa, Ontario	TAAG Park (Carleton University)	2020
Royal-Sélect de Beauport	Quebec City	Stade Beauport	2021
CS LaSalle	Montréal	Parc Riverside	2025
AS Gatineau	Gatineau, Outaouais	Parc Polyvalente le Carrefour	2025

==== Ligue 2 Québec ====
The following teams are members of the league for the 2026 season:

Team	City	Stadium	Joined
Current teams
CF L'International de Québec	Quebec City	Terrain Gérard-Chiquette	2025
AS Chaudière-Ouest	Lévis	Parc Renaud-Maillette	2025
CS Montréal Centre	Montréal	Complexe sportif Claude-Robillard	2025
CS Roussilion	Saint-Constant	Centre Municpal	2025
CS Saint-Lazare/Hudson	Saint-Lazare	Westwood Junior	2025
CS Trident	Quebec City	Complexe Sportif Bonair de L'Ancienne-Lorette	2025
CS Rivière-des-Prairies	Montreal	Terrain de Cégep Marie Victorin	2025
Lakeshore SC (Note: Lakeshore SC originally participated in the PLSQ from 2015 to 2016)	Kirkland	Parc de Bénévoles	2015
CS Mistral de Sherbrooke	Sherbrooke	Parc Sylvie-Daigle	2025
Panellinios St Michel FC	Montreal	Parc Jerry	2025
Revolution FC (Note: FC Boisbriand originally participated in the PLSQ from 2012 to 2013. In 2019 they merged with 3 youth clubs to form Revolution FC)	Saint-Eustache	Parc de l'école secondaire des Patriotes	2012
CS Union Lanaudière Sud	Repentigny	Parc Maurice-Richard	2025

==== Ligue 3 Québec ====
The following teams are members of the league for the 2026 season:

Team	City	Stadium	Joined
Current teams
CS Vallée de l'Or (Blizz'Or)	Val-d'Or	Terrain de soccer synthétique de Val-d'Or	2025
CS Boréal d'Alma	Alma	CEGEP d'Alma	2025
Chevaliers NDMC	Notre-Dame-du-Mont-Carmel	Saint Joseph Seminary Field	2025
CS Mondial de Rivière-du-Loup	Rivière-du-Loup	Cegep de Riviere-de-Loup	2025
CS Fury de Rimouski	Rimouski	Complexe sporift Guillaume-Leblanc	2025
CS Haute-Saint-Charles	Quebec City	Complexe sportif Phil Latulippe	2025
CS Titans	Bois-des-Filion	Parc Andre-Guerard	2025
FS Salaberry	Montréal	Parc Champdore	2025
Notre-Dame-de-Grâce SA	Notre-Dame-de-Grâce	Parc Martin-Luther-King	2025
CS Venturi de Saguenay	Saguenay	Terrain naturel de l'UQAC	2025
Cosmos de Granby	Granby	Parc Jean-Yves Phaneuf	2026
West Ottawa SC	Ottawa	Sir Guy Charleton Secondary School	2026
Soccer Pointe Clare	Pointe-Claire	Parc Terracotta	2026
AS Saint Lambart	Saint-Lambart	Parc de la Voie martime	2026
Dollard SC	Dollard-des-Ormeaux	Parc Dollard-des-Ormeaux	2026
CS Optimum de Victoriaville	Victoriaville	Cegep de Victoriaville	2026
AS Montis	Saint-Bruno-de-Montarville	Chalet Du Parc Marie-Victorin	2025
CS Les Ambassadeurs de Saint-Jérôme	Saint-Jérôme	Parc Multisport de Saint-Jérôme	2025
FC Boréal	Prévost	École secondaire Augustin-Norbert-Morin	2025
AS Brossard (Note: FC Brossard originally participated in the PLSQ from 2012 to 2013)	Brossard, Montérégie	Parc Illinois	2012
AS St-Léonard (Note: FC St-Léonard originally participated in the PLSQ from 2012 to 2013)	St Leonard, Montreal	Antoine de Saint-Exupéry High School	2012
CS Trois-Rivières	Trois-Rivières	Université du Québec à Trois-Rivières Stadium	2025
CS Boucherville	Boucherville	Parc Pierre-Laporte	2025
CS Lévis-Est	Lévis	School Secondary Les Etchemins	2025
CS Phénix des Rivières	Quebec City	Complexe de soccer Chauveau	2025

=== Former clubs ===
Club	City	Stadium	Joined	Final
Former teams
ACP Montréal-Nord	Montréal-Nord, Montreal	Parc Saint-Laurent	2014	2014
FC Lanaudière	Terrebonne, Lanaudière	Centre de Soccer Multifonctionnel de Terrebonne	2016	2021
Ottawa Fury FC Academy	Ottawa, Ontario	Algonquin College	2015	2016
FC Gatineau	Gatineau, Outaouais	Terrain Mont-Bleu	2013	2019
Dynamo de Quebec	Quebec City, Capitale-Nationale	Polyvalente L'Ancienne-Lorette	2017	2019
CF Montréal U23	Montréal	CF Montréal training grounds	2022	2024
FC Anjou	Anjou		2025	2025
CS Lanaudière-Nord (Note: CS Lanaudière-Nord was known as FC L'Assomption-Lanaudière from 2012 to 2015. They departed the league after 2015, returned in 2022, before again departing after 2023. They then joined L3QC in 2025.)	Joliette, Lanaudière		2012	2025
CS Braves d'Ahuntsic	Montréal		2025	2025

== Players who earned national team caps ==
The following players have earned a senior national team cap while playing in LS Pro (the year of their first cap while playing in the league is listed). Players who earned caps before or after playing in LS Pro are not included, unless they also earned caps while in the league. This section also does not include youth caps (U23 or below).

Player	Country	Year	Ref
Armel Dagrou	Burundi	2014	
Kevin Chan-Yu-Tin	Mauritius	2016	
Zohib Islam Amiri	Afghanistan	2019	
Lemus Christopher	Saint Vincent and the Grenadines	2022	

== LS Pro clubs in other competitions ==
Season	Club	Competition	Result	Record
2012	No competition held			
2013	No competition held			
2014	CS Longueuil	Inter-Provincial Cup	Runner-up	0–1–1
2015	CS Mont-Royal Outremont	Inter-Provincial Cup	Runner-up	0–1–1
2016	CS Mont-Royal Outremont	Inter-Provincial Cup	Champions	1–1–0
2017	No competition held			
2018	A.S. Blainville	Canadian Championship	Second qualifying round	2–0–2
2019	A.S. Blainville	Canadian Championship	First qualifying round	0–1–1
2020	No competition held			
2021	A.S. Blainville	Canadian Championship	Preliminary round	0–0–1
2022	CS Mont-Royal Outremont	Canadian Championship	Preliminary round	0–0–1
2023	FC Laval	Canadian Championship	Preliminary round	0–0–1
2024	CS Saint-Laurent	Canadian Championship	Quarterfinals	0–1–2
2025	FC Laval	Canadian Championship	Preliminary round	0–0–1
2026	CS Saint-Laurent	Canadian Championship	Quarterfinals	1–1–1

== See also ==
- Canadian soccer league system
- Premier Soccer Leagues Canada
