= List of Western United FC (women) players =

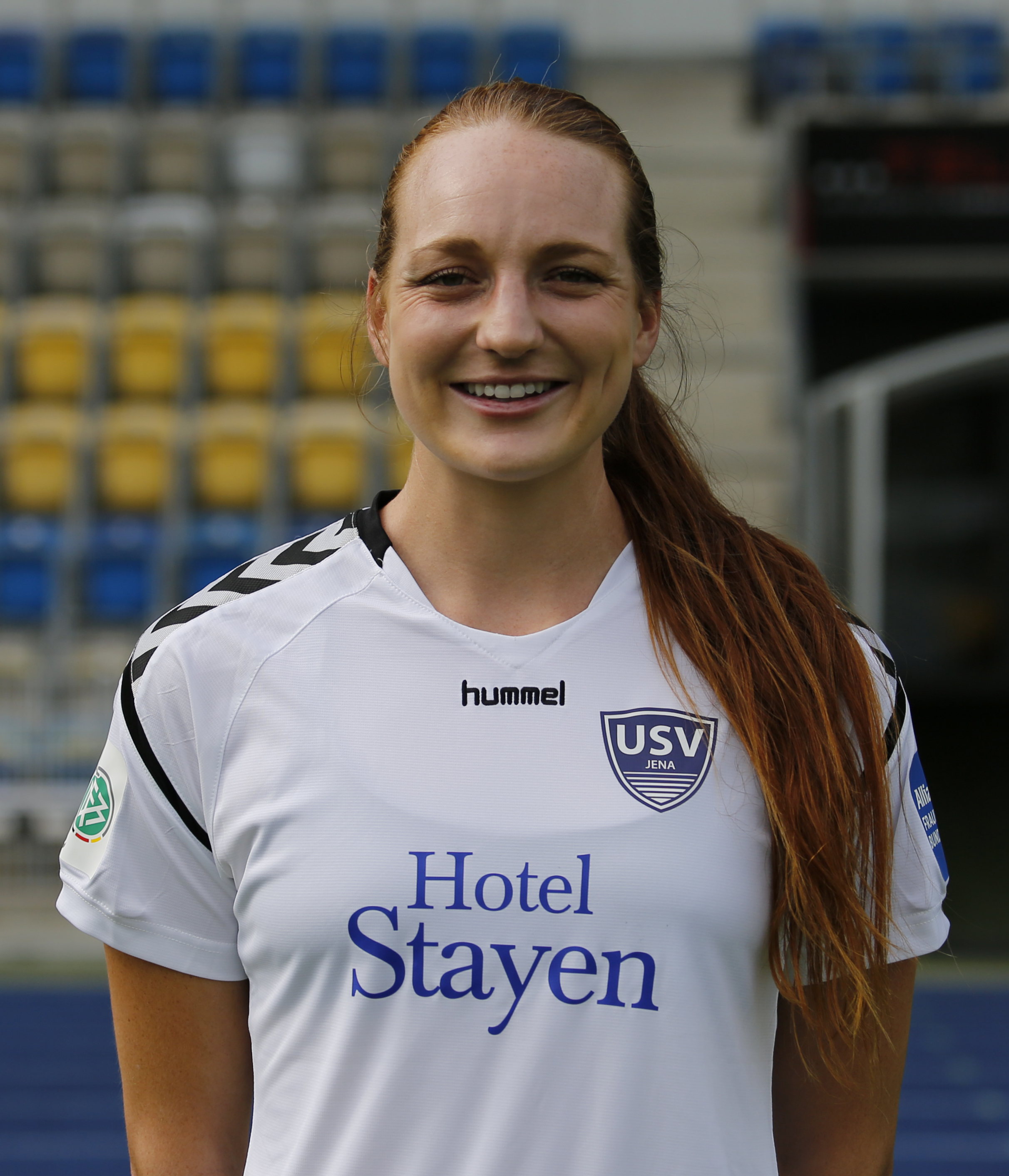
Hannah Keane is currently the top goalscorer for Western United (A-League Women) scoring 24 goals in total.

Western United Football Club (A-League Women), an association football club based in Truganina, Melbourne, was founded in 2022 after a successful bid to enter the A-League Women for the 2022–23 season. The club's first team has competed in the A-League Women, and all players who have played at least one match are listed below.

Alana Cerne currently holds the record for the greatest number of appearances for Western United (A-League Women) who has played 42 times for the club. The club's goalscoring record is held by Hannah Keane, who scored 24 goals.

== Key ==
- The list is ordered first by date of debut, and then if necessary in alphabetical order.
- Appearances as a substitute are included.
- Statistics are correct up to and including the match played on 13 April 2024. Where a player left the club permanently after this date, her statistics are updated to her date of leaving.

Positions key
GK	Goalkeeper
DF	Defender
MF	Midfielder
FW	Forward

Nationality
Unless otherwise noted, the nationality of a player is determined by the country/countries which he has played for, or if said person has not played international football, their country of birth.
Position
Playing positions are listed according to the tactical formations that were employed at the time.
Club career
Club career is defined as the first and last calendar years in which the player appeared for the club in any of the competitions listed below.
Total appearances and Total goals
Total appearances and goals comprise those in the A-League Women regular season and finals series.

== Players ==
Players highlighted in bold are still actively playing at Western United (A-League Women).

List of Western United FC (A-League Women) players
Player	Nationality	Pos	Club career	Starts	Subs	Total	Goals	Ref.
Player	Nationality	Pos	Club career	Appearances			Goals	Ref.
Hillary Beall	United States	GK	2022–2024	33	0	33	0	
**Alana Cerne**	Australia	DF	2022–	40	2	42	1	
Sydney Cummings	Guyana	DF	2022–2023	20	0	20	4	
Francesca Iermano	Australia	FW	2022–2023	3	6	9	0	
**Kahli Johnson**	Australia	FW	2022–	18	12	30	5	
**Hannah Keane**	United States	FW	2022–	38	2	40	24	
**Chloe Logarzo**	Australia	MF	2022–2023; 2023–	17	6	23	12	
Jessica McDonald	United States	FW	2022–2023	9	0	9	2	
**Emma Robers**	Australia	FW	2022–	25	10	35	2	
**Stacey Papadopoulos**	Australia	FW	2022–	31	4	35	1	
Aleksandra Sinclair	Australia	FW	2022–2023	1	7	8	0	
**Adriana Taranto**	Australia	MF	2022–	37	2	39	6	
**Melissa Taranto**	Australia	MF	2022–	39	2	41	2	
**Julia Sardo**	Australia	FW	2022–	14	13	27	0	
Jaclyn Sawicki	Philippines	MF	2022–2024	30	5	35	1	
**Tyla-Jay Vlajnic**	Serbia	DF	2022–	32	3	35	4	
**Natasha Dakic**	Australia	DF	2022–	4	11	15	0	
**Aimee Medwin**	Australia	DF	2022–2023; 2023–	14	3	17	1	
Danielle Steer	Canada	FW	2023	6	8	14	2	
Angela Beard	Australia	DF	2023	10	2	12	0	
Alyssa Dall'Oste	Australia	GK	2023–	8	1	9	0	
Tiana Jaber	Australia	MF	2023	0	3	3	0	
**Kiara De Domizio**	Australia	FW	2023–	0	4	4	1	
**Keiwa Hieda**	Japan	FW	2023–	12	11	23	3	
**Grace Maher**	Australia	MF	2023–	23	0	23	1	
**Avaani Prakash**	Australia	MF	2023–	3	11	14	0	
**Lucy Richards**	Australia	DF	2023–	1	6	7	0	
**Katherine Larsen**	Denmark	GK	2024–	2	0	2	0	
**Catherine Zimmerman**	Australia	FW	2024–	2	3	5	1	
