= 2023–24 Western United FC (women) season =

2nd season in existence of Western United FC (women)

Western United
2023–24 season
- Chairman: Jason Sourasis
- Manager: Mark Torcaso (until 1 December 2023); Kat Smith (from 1 December 2023)
- Stadium: City Vista Recreation Reserve; Wyndham Regional Football Facility
- A-League Women: 3rd
- A-League Women Finals: Elimination-finals
- Top goalscorer: League: Hannah Keane (10); All: Hannah Keane (10)
- Highest home attendance: 2,200 vs. Melbourne Victory (22 October 2023); A-League Women
- Lowest home attendance: 574 vs. Canberra United (1 March 2024); A-League Women
- Average home league attendance: 1,332
- Biggest win: 4–1 vs. Melbourne Victory (A) (6 January 2024); A-League Women; 3–0 vs. Wellington Phoenix (H) (18 February 2024); A-League Women
- Biggest defeat: 1–3 (4 times); 0–2 (twice); 2–4 (twice)

The 2023–24 season was Western United Football Club (women)'s second season, in the A-League Women. Western United finished 3rd in their A-League Women, finishing in the elimination-finals.

== Players ==
=== First-team squad ===
As of 22 February 2024

Note: Flags indicate national team as defined under FIFA eligibility rules; some limited exceptions apply. Players may hold more than one non-FIFA nationality.

No.	Pos.	Nation	Player
1	GK	AUS	Alyssa Dall'Oste
2	FW	AUS	Stacey Papadopoulos
3	DF	AUS	Silver Bell Morris
4	MF	PHI	Jaclyn Sawicki (co-captain)
5	DF	AUS	Aimee Medwin
6	MF	AUS	Chloe Logarzo (co-captain)
7	FW	AUS	Kiara De Domizio
9	FW	USA	Hannah Keane
10	FW	AUS	Kahli Johnson
11	MF	AUS	Emma Robers
12	MF	AUS	Lucy Richards
13	MF	AUS	Avaani Prakash

No.	Pos.	Nation	Player
14	DF	AUS	Natasha Dakic
15	MF	AUS	Adriana Taranto
16	MF	AUS	Melissa Taranto
17	FW	AUS	Raquel Deralas
18	DF	AUS	Grace Maher (vice-captain)
19	DF	SRB	Tyla-Jay Vlajnic
20	MF	JPN	Keiwa Hieda (scholarship)
22	DF	AUS	Alana Cerne
24	DF	AUS	Julia Sardo
26	GK	AUS	Natalie Picak (scholarship)
31	GK	DEN	Kathrine Larsen
34	FW	USA	Catherine Zimmerman

== Review and events ==
=== Background ===
In Western United's inaugural and previous season in 2022–23, they finished 2nd in the regular season and finished in the Grand Final as runners-up, losing 4–0 to Sydney FC.

=== Pre-season ===
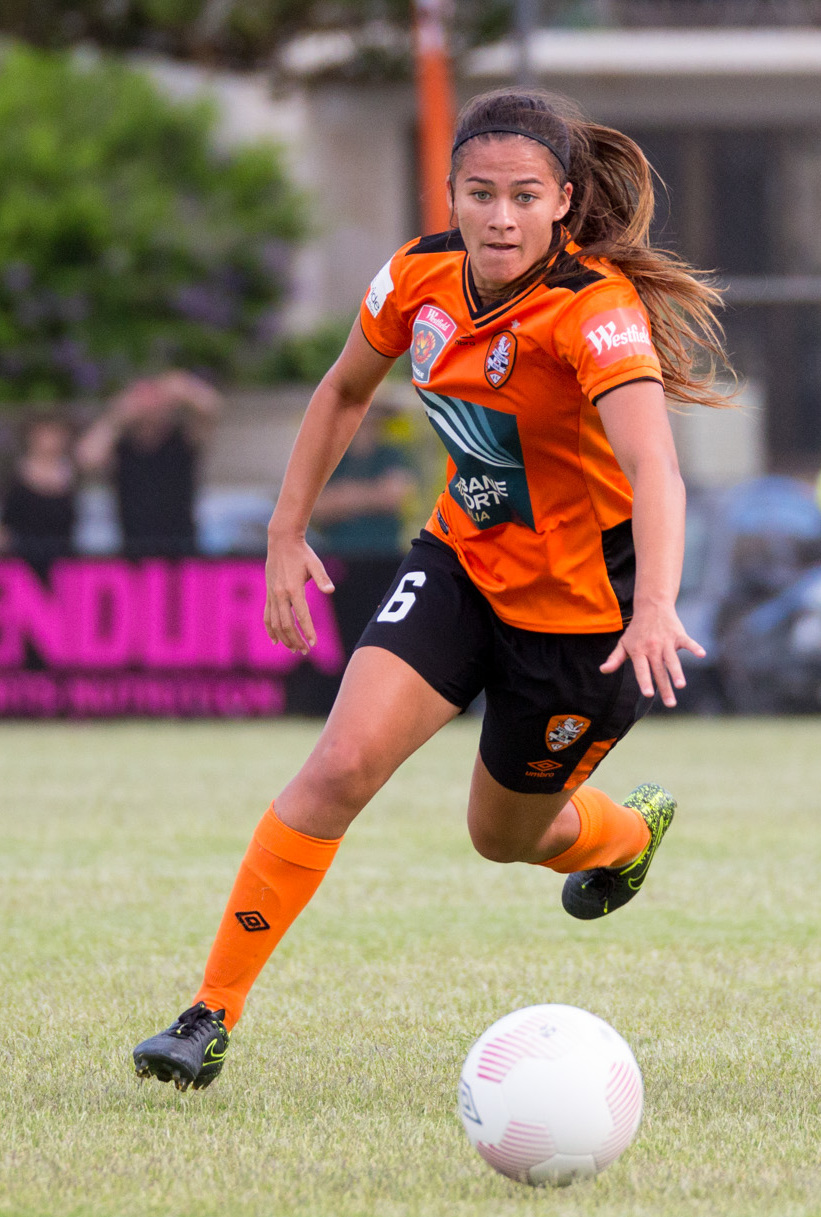
Philippines representatives Jaclyn Sawicki and Angela Beard played in the 2023 FIFA Women's World Cup during pre-season.

On 9 June, Kahli Johnson signed on for the season. During this off-season, Jaclyn Sawicki and Angela Beard were being represented with the Philippines in the 2023 FIFA Women's World Cup. On 26 July, American attacker Catherine Zimmerman signed ahead of the season from rivals Melbourne Victory. The next week saw the signing of Australian defender Grace Maher on a one-year deal from Canberra United. On 18 August, six players departed Western United; Francesca Iermano, Aleksandra Sinclair, Danielle Steer, Tiana Jaber, Sydney Cummings, and Hariet Withers. Three days later, Alana Cerne signed on for the season.

Kahli Johnson was called up to the Australia U20 squad on 22 August in a week-long training camp. The same day saw Adriana and Melissa Taranto sign on for the season. The day after, Mark Torcaso; remaining in his role as head coach for Western United had become the new head coach of the Philippines women's national team with assistant coach Andrew Durante. Within that, Natasha Dakic, Silver Bell Morris, and Alyssa Dall'Oste all signed on for the season. On 24 August, Japanese winger Keiwa Hieda signed for the season from affiliated club Calder United. Five days later, Emma Robers and Stacey Papadopoulos signed on for the season and Angela Beard made a permanent transfer to Swedish club Linköping FC. On 31 August, Julia Sardo and Tyla-Jay Vlajnic signed on for the season, as did Jaclyn Sawicki the day after. Calder United goalkeeper Natalie Picak signed a scholarship deal on 4 September, and midfielder Lucy Richards signed on 6 September; that day saw Alana Cerne and Kahli Johnson be called-up to the Australia U23 squad for two friendlies against Italian club AC Milan and Scotland U23. On 7 September, Raquel Deralas signed on for the season.

Western United played their first friendly of the season on 27 September against an FV State Team selection at The Home of the Matildas, winning 1–0 with Emma Robers scoring the goal. They revisited the venue on 7 October in a behind closed doors friendly against Melbourne Victory in a 2–0 loss. On 11 October, Australian attacker Kiara De Domizio signed for the season from Sydney Olympic.

=== October ===

Starting XI for A-League Women away match against Perth Glory on 14 October

Catherine Zimmerman was confirmed to be out due to a foot injury that occurred during pre-season ahead of the 2023–24 A-League Women round 1 clash against Perth Glory away. The match resulted in a 2–0 loss sending Western United to the bottom of the table after Round 1. On 16 October, the Wyndham City Council approved plans for home matches to be played at the Wyndham Regional Football Facility (later known as Ironbark Fields) in Tarneit. On 18 October, the APL Grand Final decision was reversed and replaced with Unite Round; a regular season round played in Sydney. This resulted in Western United's home match in Round 12 against Sydney FC change to play at Allianz Stadium.

Chloe Logarzo and Lucy Richards entered the squad ahead of Round 2 against rivals Melbourne Victory at home. Western United won 2–1 in a comeback win in the last minute thanks to goals from Melissa Taranto and Keiwa Hieda recording their first win of the season rising to eighth place. On 31 October, Australian youth international and AFF Women's Championship winner Avaani Prakish signed a professional contract ahead of the season.

=== November ===
On 1 November, American goalkeeper and previous season's winner of Western United's Player of the Season Hillary Beall returned on loan from American club Racing Louisville until the end of the season. Her, alongside Kiara De Domizio, Avaani Prakish, and Natasha Dakic entered the squad for Round 3 against Melbourne City at home. The match resulted in a 2–2 draw after taking the lead through Hannah Keane, going behind, and equalizing late on through Kahli Johnson rising into the top six at sixth place spot.

Jaclyn Sawicki and Tyla-Jay Vlajnic both returned from international duties ahead of Round 4 against Wellington Phoenix away as Western United fell to their second loss of the season, losing 3–1 with only Chloe Logarzo scoring a consolation goal in the 93rd minute falling outside the top six to seventh place. The next week had Melissa Taranto return from injury, and Natalie Picak enter the squad ahead of Round 5 against Brisbane Roar away. Western United returned to winning ways after 1–0 win through Kahli Johnson remaining unmoved in the ladder at seventh place.

Three days after the match against Brisbane Roar, Kahli Johnson and Avaani Prakish were called-up for the Australia under-20 team for 10 days in China. Tyla-Jay Vlajnic returned to the squad ahead of Round 6 against the Western Sydney Wanderers at home, as Western United fell to a 2–0 loss falling to eighth place.

=== December ===
On 1 December, Western United confirmed the departure of head coach Mark Torcaso for further progression in his stint with the Philippines women's national team, with assistant coach Helen Winterburn also departing after accepting a full-time position as football coach at the Central Coast Sports College. With this, Kat Smith was appointed as new coach, with Chelsea Noonan appointed as new assistant coach. With an unchanged squad for Round 7 against Adelaide United away, the match resulted in a 3–1 win via a brace from Adriana Taranto, and Hannah Keane sent them back into the top six at fifth place.

Kahli Johnson and Avaani Prakish both returned from their international duties ahead of Round 8 against the Newcastle Jets away as Western United fell to a 4–2 loss; reaching level terms twice through Chloe Logarzo and Stacey Papadopoulos before conceding the last two goals, falling to seventh place. In the lead-up to the following week, Kahli Johnson went out of the squad due to leg injury ahead of Round 9's clash against Perth Glory at home. The match resulted in a 1–0 win through Chloe Logarzo scoring the only goal in the 18th minute heading back up to fifth place. Kiara De Domizio and Lucy Richards entered the squad ahead of Round 10 against Canberra United away with Chloe Logarzo played her 100th A-League Women match; resulting in a 1–1 draw with Adriana Taranto equalizing after an Alana Cerne own goal; falling to sixth place.

== Transfers ==
=== Transfers in ===
No.	Position	Player	Transferred from	Type/fee	Contract length	Date	Ref.
34	FW	(United States) Catherine Zimmerman	Melbourne Victory	Free transfer	1 year	26 July 2023	
18	DF	Grace Maher	Canberra United	Free transfer	1 year	4 August 2023	
20	FW	(Japan) Keiwa Hieda	(Australia) Calder United	Scholarship	1 year	24 August 2023	
26	GK	Natalie Picak	(Australia) Calder United	Scholarship	1 year	24 August 2023	
12	MF	Lucy Richards	(Australia) Calder United	Free transfer	1 year	6 September 2023	
7	FW	Kiara De Domizio	(Australia) Sydney Olympic	Free transfer	1 year	11 October 2023	
13	MF	Avaani Prakash	(Australia) Macarthur FC	Free transfer	1 year	31 October 2023	
21	GK	(United States) Hillary Beall	(United States) Racing Louisville	Loan	9 months	1 November 2023	
5	DF	Aimee Medwin	Unattached	Free transfer	5 months	6 February 2024	
31	GK	(Denmark) Kathrine Larsen	(Denmark) Brøndby	Free transfer	4 months	22 February 2024	

=== Transfers out ===
No.	Position	Player	Transferred to	Type/fee	Date	Ref.
5	DF	Aimee Medwin	Unattached	End of contract	23 February 2023	
13	FW	(Canada) Danielle Steer	(Canada) Nautsa’mawt	End of contract	16 May 2023	
20	DF	(Guyana) Sydney Cummings	(United States) San Diego Wave	End of contract	27 June 2023	
21	GK	(United States) Hillary Beall	(United States) Racing Louisville	End of loan	29 June 2023	
7	DF	Francesca Iermano	Unattached	End of contract	18 August 2023	
25	DF	Tiana Jaber	Unattached	End of contract	18 August 2023	
18	FW	Aleksandra Sinclair	Unattached	End of contract	18 August 2023	
12	FW	Harriet Withers	Unattached	End of contract	18 August 2023	
23	DF	(Philippines) Angela Beard	(Sweden) Linköpings	Undisclosed	29 August 2023	
21	GK	(United States) Hillary Beall	(United States) Racing Louisville	End of loan	16 February 2024	

=== Contract extensions ===
No.	Player	Position	Duration	Date	Ref.
9	(United States) Hannah Keane	Forward	1 year	22 February 2023	
10	Kahli Johnson	Forward	1 year	9 June 2023	
15	Adriana Taranto	Midfielder	1 year	22 August 2023	
16	Melisa Taranto	Midfielder	1 year	22 August 2023	
2	Stacey Papadopoulos	Forward	1 year	28 August 2023	
11	Emma Robers	Midfielder	1 year	28 August 2023	
19	(Serbia) Tyla-Jay Vlajnic	Defender	1 year	31 August 2023	
24	Julia Sardo	Defender	1 year	31 August 2023	
4	(Philippines) Jaclyn Sawicki	Midfielder	1 year	1 September 2023	
17	Raquel Deralas	Forward	1 year	7 September 2023	

== Pre-season and friendlies ==
Win Draw Loss

26 September 2023	FV State Team (Victoria (state))	0–1	(Australia) Western United	Melbourne
19:00		Report	Robers 45'	Stadium: The Home of the Matildas
Note: Match was played over two halves of 35 minutes each

7 October 2023	Melbourne Victory (Australia)	2–0	(Australia) Western United	Melbourne
09:40 AEDT	Lowe 64'; Okino 90'	Report		Stadium: The Home of the Matildas; Attendance: 0 (behind closed doors)

== Competitions ==
=== Overall record ===
Competition	First match	Last match	Starting round	Final position	Record							
Competition	First match	Last match	Starting round	Final position	Pld	W	D	L	GF	GA	GD	Win %
A-League Women	14 October 2023	28 March 2024	Matchday 1	3rd	22	11	3	8	37	34	+3	50.00
A-League Women Finals	13 April 2024		Elimination-finals	Elimination-finals	1	0	0	1	2	4	−2	0.00
Total					23	11	3	9	39	38	+1	47.83

Source: Soccerway

=== A-League Women ===
==== League table ====
Pos	Team	Pld	W	D	L	GF	GA	GD	Pts	Qualification
1	Melbourne City	22	12	5	5	40	29	+11	41	Qualification to Finals series and 2024–25 AFC Women's Champions League
2	Sydney FC (C)	22	11	6	5	31	20	+11	39	Qualification to Finals series
3	Western United	22	11	3	8	37	34	+3	36	Qualification to Finals series
4	Melbourne Victory	22	10	6	6	44	29	+15	36	Qualification to Finals series
5	Central Coast Mariners	22	10	5	7	31	24	+7	35	Qualification to Finals series

Source: A-Leagues
Rules for classification: 1) points; 2) wins; 3) goal difference; 4) goals scored; 5) head-to-head results; 6) Fair Play points; 7) away head-to-head results; 8) home head-to-head results; 9) toss of a coin
(C) Champions

==== Results summary ====
Overall								Home						Away					
Pld	W	D	L	GF	GA	GD	Pts	W	D	L	GF	GA	GD	W	D	L	GF	GA	GD
21	11	3	7	37	33	+4	36	8	1	2	23	14	+9	3	2	5	14	19	−5

Source: KEEPUP

==== Results by round ====
Round	1	2	3	4	5	6	7	8	9	10	11	12	13	14	15	16	17	18	19	20	21	22
Ground	A	H	H	A	A	H	A	A	H	A	A	N	H	A	H	H	H	H	A	H	A	A
Result	L	W	D	L	W	L	W	L	W	D	W	L	W	W	W	W	W	W	L	L	L	D
Position	12	8	6	7	7	8	5	7	5	6	3	5	5	2	2	2	1	1	1	2	3	3
Points	0	3	4	4	7	7	10	10	13	14	17	17	20	23	26	29	32	35	35	35	35	36

Source: KEEPUP
A = Away; H = Home; N = Neutral; W = Win; D = Draw; L = Loss

==== Matches ====
The final league fixtures were announced on 24 August 2023.

Win Draw Loss

14 October 2023 1	Perth Glory	2–0	Western United	Perth
19:00 AWST	Phonsongkham 49'; Jale 79'	Report		Stadium: Macedonia Park; Attendance: 1,114; Referee: Isabella Blaess

22 October 2023 2	Western United	2–1	Melbourne Victory	Melbourne
16:00 AEDT	M. Taranto 66'; Hieda 90'	Report	Checker 15'	Stadium: City Vista Recreation Reserve; Attendance: 2,200; Referee: Georgia Ghirardello

5 November 2023 3	Western United	2–2	Melbourne City	Melbourne
16:00 AEDT	Keane 6'; Johnson 86'	Report	McNamara 49'; Wilkinson 75'	Stadium: City Vista Recreation Reserve; Attendance: 1,723; Referee: Bec Mackie

12 November 2023 4	Wellington Phoenix	3–1	Western United	Porirua
16:00 NZDT	Knott 31'; Fraser 41'; Hieda 76' (o.g.)	Report	Logarzo 90+3'	Stadium: Jerry Collins Stadium; Attendance: 1,746; Referee: Beth Rattray

19 November 2023 5	Brisbane Roar	0–1	Western United	Brisbane
15:00 AEST		Report	Johnson 12'	Stadium: Ballymore Stadium; Attendance: 2,486; Referee: Rebecca Durcau

25 November 2023 6	Western United	0–2	Western Sydney Wanderers	Melbourne
16:00 AEDT		Report	Harding 82'; Rue 90+3'	Stadium: City Vista Recreation Reserve; Attendance: 925; Referee: Azusa Sugino

9 December 2023 7	Adelaide United	1–3	Western United	Adelaide
15:30 ACDT	Dawber 71'	Report	A. Taranto 45', 66'; Keane 90+4'	Stadium: Marden Sports Complex; Attendance: 587; Referee: Isabella Blaess

17 December 2023 8	Newcastle Jets	4–2	Western United	Newcastle
17:00 AEDT	Allan 25', 74'; van Egmond 62'; Bolden 69'	Report	Logarzo 54' (pen.); Papadopoulos 64'	Stadium: Newcastle Number 2 Sports Ground; Attendance: 2,023; Referee: Isabella Libri

22 December 2023 9	Western United	1–0	Perth Glory	Melbourne
17:00 AEDT	Logarzo 18'	Report		Stadium: City Vista Recreation Reserve; Attendance: 1,900; Referee: Rebecca Durcau
Note: Match originally scheduled for 19:00 AEDT. It was rescheduled for 17:00 AEDT.

30 December 2023 10	Canberra United	1–1	Western United	Canberra
17:00 AEDT	Cerne 30' (o.g.)	Report	A. Taranto 76'	Stadium: McKellar Park; Attendance: 1,235; Referee: Isabella Blaess

6 January 2024 11	Melbourne Victory	1–4	Western United	Melbourne
18:00 AEDT	Lowe 78'	Report	Hieda 32'; A. Taranto 34'; Logarzo 60', 69'	Stadium: The Home of the Matildas; Attendance: 1,686; Referee: Beth Rattray

14 January 2024 12	Western United	0–1	Sydney FC	Sydney
17:00 AEDT		Report	Vine 70'	Stadium: Allianz Stadium; Attendance: 4,039; Referee: Casey Reibelt
Note: Originally scheduled for 13 January 2024, was moved due to Unite Round.

21 January 2024 13	Western United	1–0	Adelaide United	Melbourne
18:00 AEDT	Hieda 52'	Report		Stadium: City Vista Recreation Reserve; Attendance: 705; Referee: Bec Mackie

25 January 2024 14	Melbourne City	1–3	Western United	Melbourne
17:00 AEDT	Wilkinson 32'	Report	Keane 28', 53'; Johnson 79'	Stadium: AAMI Park; Attendance: 1,656; Referee: Rebecca Durcau
Note: Match originally scheduled for 28 January at City Football Academy.

3 February 2024 15	Western United	2–1	Central Coast Mariners	Hobart
14:15 AEDT	Sawicki 2'; Keane 28'	Report	Badawiya 6'	Stadium: North Hobart Oval; Attendance: 2,007; Referee: Isabella Blaess

11 February 2024 16	Western United	3–2	Brisbane Roar	Melbourne
17:00 AEDT	Logarzo 8', 90+2' (pen.); Taranto 79'	Report	Stephenson 29'; Corbin 31'	Stadium: City Vista Recreation Reserve; Attendance: 607; Referee: Bec Mackie

18 February 2024 17	Western United	3–0	Wellington Phoenix	Melbourne
17:00 AEDT	Logarzo 29'; Maher 72'; Keane 78'	Report		Stadium: City Vista Recreation Reserve; Attendance: 638; Referee: Casey Reibelt

1 March 2024 18	Western United	4–2	Canberra United	Melbourne
19:00 AEDT	Keane 1', 14', 64'; Logarzo 10' (pen.)	Report	Jackson 49'; Heyman 90+5'	Stadium: City Vista Recreation Reserve; Attendance: 574; Referee: Isabella Libri

9 March 2024 19	Sydney FC	3–1	Western United	Sydney
19:00 AEDT	Lemon 15'; Vine 70', 90+3'	Report	Zimmerman 77'	Stadium: Leichhardt Oval; Attendance: 3,442; Referee: Rebecca Durcau

17 March 2024 20	Western United	1–3	Newcastle Jets	Melbourne
16:00 AEDT	Medwin 20'	Report	Copus-Brown 4'; Allan 21'; Bolden 66'	Stadium: Wyndham Regional Football Facility; Attendance: 2,040; Referee: Georgia Ghirardello

23 March 2024 21	Western Sydney Wanderers	3–1	Western United	Sydney
18:00 AEDT	Buchanan 39'; Harding 61', 82'	Report	Keane 17'	Stadium: Wanderers Football Park; Attendance: 824; Referee: Casey Reibelt

28 March 2024 22	Central Coast Mariners	1–1	Western United	Gosford
19:00 AEDT	Rasmussen 71'	Report	De Domizio 82'	Stadium: Industree Group Stadium; Attendance: 1,529; Referee: Rebecca Durcau

==== Finals series ====
13 April 2024 Elimination-finals	Western United	2–4 (a.e.t.)	Newcastle Jets	Melbourne
18:30 AEST	Cerne 22'; Zimmerman 68' (pen.)	Report	Bolden 11', 45+1' (pen.); Ayres 101'; Haban 113'	Stadium: Wyndham Regional Football Facility; Attendance: 3,370; Referee: Georgia Ghirardello

== Statistics ==
=== Appearances and goals ===
Includes all competitions. Players with no appearances not included in the list.

No.	Pos.	Nat.	Name	A-League Women				Total	
No.	Pos.	Nat.	Name	Regular season		Finals series		Total	
No.	Pos.	Nat.	Name	Apps	Goals	Apps	Goals	Apps	Goals
1	GK	(Australia)	Alyssa Dall'Oste	7	0	1	0	8	0
2	DF	(Australia)	Stacey Papadopoulos	21+1	1	1	0	23	1
4	MF	(Philippines)	Jaclyn Sawicki	20	1	1	0	21	1
5	DF	(Australia)	Aimee Medwin	5+2	1	1	0	8	1
6	MF	(Australia)	Chloe Logarzo	17	9	0	0	17	9
7	FW	(Australia)	Kiara De Domizio	0+3	1	0+1	0	4	1
9	FW	(United States)	Hannah Keane	18+2	10	0	0	20	10
10	FW	(Australia)	Kahli Johnson	6+6	3	1	0	13	3
11	MF	(Australia)	Emma Robers	8+7	0	1	0	16	0
12	DF	(Australia)	Lucy Richards	1+6	0	0	0	7	0
13	MF	(Australia)	Avaani Prakash	3+10	0	0+1	0	14	0
14	DF	(Australia)	Natasha Dakic	2+2	0	0	0	4	0
15	MF	(Australia)	Adriana Taranto	18+1	5	0	0	19	5
16	MF	(Australia)	Melissa Taranto	21	1	1	0	22	1
18	MF	(Australia)	Grace Maher	22	1	1	0	23	1
19	DF	(Serbia)	Tyla-Jay Vlajnic	15+1	0	1	0	17	0
20	FW	(Japan)	Keiwa Hieda	12+10	3	0+1	0	23	3
22	FW	(Australia)	Alana Cerne	22	0	1	1	23	1
24	DF	(Australia)	Julia Sardo	8+7	0	0+1	0	16	0
31	GK	(Denmark)	Kathrine Larsen	2	0	0	0	2	0
34	FW	(United States)	Catherine Zimmerman	1+3	1	1	1	5	2
Player(s) transferred out but featured this season
21	GK	(United States)	Hillary Beall	13	0	0	0	13	0

=== Disciplinary record ===
Includes all competitions. The list is sorted by squad number when total cards are equal. Players with no cards not included in the list.

Rank	No.	Pos.	Nat.	Name	A-League Women						Total		
Rank	No.	Pos.	Nat.	Name	Regular season			Finals series			Total		
Rank	No.	Pos.	Nat.	Name	Booked	(yellow card) (yellow-red card)	Sent off (straight red)	Booked	(yellow card) (yellow-red card)	Sent off (straight red)	Booked	(yellow card) (yellow-red card)	Sent off (straight red)
1	2	DF	(Australia)	Stacey Papadopoulos	5	0	0	1	0	0	6	0	0
2	15	MF	(Australia)	Adriana Taranto	4	0	0	0	0	0	4	0	0
2	16	MF	(Australia)	Melissa Taranto	3	0	0	1	0	0	4	0	0
4	22	MF	(Australia)	Alana Cerne	3	0	0	0	0	0	3	0	0
5	7	FW	(Australia)	Kiara De Domizio	1	0	0	1	0	0	2	0	0
6	4	MF	(Philippines)	Jaclyn Sawicki	1	0	0	0	0	0	1	0	0
6	6	MF	(Australia)	Chloe Logarzo	1	0	0	0	0	0	1	0	0
6	9	FW	(United States)	Hannah Keane	1	0	0	0	0	0	1	0	0
6	18	MF	(Australia)	Grace Maher	1	0	0	0	0	0	1	0	0
6	34	FW	(United States)	Catherine Zimmerman	0	0	0	1	0	0	1	0	0
Total					20	0	0	4	0	0	24	0	0

=== Clean sheets ===
Includes all competitions. The list is sorted by squad number when total clean sheets are equal. Numbers in parentheses represent games where both goalkeepers participated and both kept a clean sheet; the number in parentheses is awarded to the goalkeeper who was substituted on, whilst a full clean sheet is awarded to the goalkeeper who was on the field at the start of play. Goalkeepers with no clean sheets not included in the list.

Rank	No.	Nat.	Goalkeeper	A-League Women		Total
Rank	No.	Nat.	Goalkeeper	Regular season	Finals series	Total
1	21	(United States)	Hillary Beall	4	0	4

== See also ==
- 2023–24 Western United FC season
