= 2024–25 Western United FC (women) season =

3rd season in existence of Western United FC (women)

Western United
2024–25 season
- Chairman: Jason Sourasis
- Manager: Kat Smith
- Stadium: Ironbark Fields
- A-League Women: 6th
- A-League Women Finals: Elimination-final
- Top goalscorer: League: Kahli Johnson (8); All: Kahli Johnson (8)
- Highest home attendance: 807 vs. Wellington Phoenix (1 November 2024); A-League Women
- Lowest home attendance: 515 vs. Sydney FC (7 December 2024); A-League Women
- Average home league attendance: 646
- Biggest win: 4–2 vs. Wellington Phoenix (1 November 2024); A-League Women
- Biggest defeat: 1–5 vs. Western Sydney Wanderers (A) (14 December 2024); A-League Women
- All statistics correct as of 15 December 2024.

The 2024–25 season was Western United Football Club (women)'s third season in the A-League Women.

== Players ==
=== First-team squad ===
As of 25 February 2025

Note: Flags indicate national team as defined under FIFA eligibility rules; some limited exceptions apply. Players may hold more than one non-FIFA nationality.

No.	Pos.	Nation	Player
1	GK	AUS	Alyssa Dall'Oste
2	MF	AUS	Emily Roach
4	DF	AUS	Claudia Mihocic
5	DF	AUS	Aimee Medwin
6	MF	AUS	Chloe Berryhill (co-captain)
7	FW	AUS	Kiara De Domizio
8	MF	AUS	Sasha Grove
9	MF	PHI	Sara Eggesvik
11	FW	COL	Sandra Ibarguen
13	MF	AUS	Avaani Prakash
15	MF	AUS	Adriana Taranto

No.	Pos.	Nation	Player
16	MF	AUS	Melissa Taranto
18	DF	AUS	Grace Maher (vice-captain)
19	FW	AUS	Alana Cortellino
20	MF	JPN	Keiwa Hieda
22	DF	AUS	Alana Cerne
24	DF	AUS	Julia Sardo
26	GK	AUS	Natalie Picak
28	DF	COL	Isabel Dehakiz
34	FW	USA	Catherine Zimmerman
36	GK	AUS	Chloe Lincoln

== Transfers ==
=== Transfers in ===
No.	Position	Player	From	Type/fee	Contract length	Date	Ref
36	GK	Chloe Lincoln	Canberra United	Free transfer	1 year	31 May 2024	
8	MF	Sasha Grove	Canberra United	Free transfer	2 years	5 June 2024	
19	FW	Alana Cortellino	(Australia) Bulleen Lions	Free transfer	2 years	16 August 2024	
9	MF	(Philippines) Sara Eggesvik	Unattached	Free transfer	1 year	21 August 2024	
28	DF	(Colombia) Isabel Dehakiz	(Australia) Bulleen Lions	Free transfer	1 year	17 September 2024	
4	DF	Claudia Mihocic	Perth Glory	Free transfer	1 year	17 September 2024	
2	MF	Emily Roach	(Australia) South Melbourne	Free transfer	1 year	26 September 2024	
11	FW	(Colombia) Sandra Ibarguen	(Colombia) Deportivo Pasto	Free transfer	1 year	2 October 2024	

=== Transfers out ===
No.	Position	Player	Transferred to	Type/fee	Date	Ref
31	GK	(Denmark) Kathrine Larsen	(Sweden) Malmö FF	End of contract	17 April 2024	
2	FW	Stacey Papadopoulos	(Scotland) Hibernian	End of contract	30 May 2024	
9	FW	(United States) Hannah Keane	(United States) Tampa Bay Sun	End of contract	30 May 2024	
4	MF	(Philippines) Jaclyn Sawicki	(Canada) Calgary Wild	End of contract	20 August 2024	
3	DF	Silver Bell Morris	Unattached	End of contract	6 September 2024	
11	MF	Emma Robers	Unattached	End of contract	6 September 2024	
12	MF	Lucy Richards	Unattached	End of contract	6 September 2024	
14	DF	Natasha Dakic	Unattached	End of contract	6 September 2024	
17	FW	Raquel Deralas	Unattached	End of contract	6 September 2024	
19	DF	(Serbia) Tyla-Jay Vlajnic	Unattached	End of contract	6 September 2024	
10	FW	Kahli Johnson	(Canada) Calgary Wild	Undisclosed	25 February 2025	

=== Contract extensions ===
No.	Player	Position	Duration	Date	Ref.
22	Alana Cerne	Defender	1 year	9 April 2024	
10	Kahli Johnson	Forward	1 year	29 May 2024	
15	Adriana Taranto	Midfielder	1 year	12 August 2024	
16	Melissa Taranto	Midfielder	1 year	12 August 2024	
24	Julia Sardo	Right-back	1 year	13 August 2024	
1	Alyssa Dall'Oste	Goalkeeper	1 year	14 August 2024	
26	Natalie Picak	Goalkeeper	1 year	14 August 2024	
5	Aimee Medwin	Left-back	1 year	15 August 2024	
18	Grace Maher	Defender	2 years	3 September 2024	
13	Avaani Prakash	Attacking midfielder	1 year	4 September 2024	
6	Chloe Berryhill	Midfielder	1 year	12 September 2024	
7	Kiara De Domizio	Forward	1 year	22 September 2024	
20	(Japan) Keiwa Hieda	Midfielder	1 year	22 September 2024	
34	(United States) Catherine Zimmerman	Forward	1 year	23 September 2024	

== Pre-season and friendlies ==
5 October 2024	Adelaide United (Australia)	2–0	(Australia) Western United	Mildura, Australia
14:00 AEST	Middleton; Grigg	Report		Stadium: Mildura Sporting Precinct

20 October 2024	Western United (Australia)	1–4	(Australia) Melbourne Victory	Ballarat, Australia
14:00 AEDT	? (?)	Report	Gielnik (?); Lowe (?); Flannery (?); Hussein (?)	Stadium: Morshead Park

26 October 2024	Western United (Australia)	1–0	(Australia) Melbourne City	Melbourne, Australia
14:00 AEDT	Medwin 72'	Report		Attendance: 0 (behind closed doors)

== Competitions ==
=== Overall record ===
Competition	First match	Last match	Final position	Record							
Competition	First match	Last match	Final position	Pld	W	D	L	GF	GA	GD	Win %
A-League Women	1 November 2024	20 April 2025	6th	23	9	6	8	39	46	−7	39.13
A-League Women Finals	27 April 2025	27 April 2025	Elimination-final	1	0	0	1	0	1	−1	0.00
Total				24	9	6	9	39	47	−8	37.50

Last updated: 27 April 2025
Source: Competitions

=== A-League Women ===
==== League table ====
Pos	Team	Pld	W	D	L	GF	GA	GD	Pts	Qualification
4	Central Coast Mariners (C)	23	9	7	7	31	25	+6	34	Qualification for Finals series
5	Canberra United	23	9	6	8	28	31	−3	33	Qualification for Finals series
6	Western United	23	9	6	8	39	46	−7	33	Qualification for Finals series
7	Brisbane Roar	23	8	2	13	46	42	+4	26	
8	Sydney FC	23	7	4	12	23	29	−6	25	

Source: A-Leagues
Rules for classification: 1) points; 2) goal difference; 3) goals scored; 4) wins; 5) head-to-head results; 5a) head-to-head points; 5b) head-to-head goal difference; 6) Fair Play points; 7) away goal difference; 8) away goals per match; 9) home goal difference; 10) home goals per match; 11) toss of a coin in an event of a tie of two clubs.
(C) Champions

==== Matches ====
Win Draw Loss

All times are in local time (AEST/AEDT).

1 November 2024 1	Western United	4–2	Wellington Phoenix	Melbourne
19:00	Logarzo 17', 40'; Medwin 19'; Johnson 39'	Report	Grove 15' (o.g.); Main 82' (pen.)	Stadium: Ironbark Fields; Attendance: 807; Referee: Georgia Ghirardello

8 November 2024 2	Western United	0–0	Central Coast Mariners	Melbourne
19:00		Report		Stadium: Ironbark Fields; Attendance: 617; Referee: Mikayla Ryan

17 November 2024 3	Melbourne Victory	4–1	Western United	Melbourne
16:00	Gielnik 1', 9', 41'; O'Grady 80'	Report	Zimmerman 20'	Stadium: Home of the Matildas; Attendance: 1,014; Referee: Rachel Mitchenson

23 November 2024 4	Newcastle Jets	1–1	Western United	Sydney
17:00	Cicco 71'	Report	Maher 80'	Stadium: Netstrata Jubilee Stadium (Note: Match moved from Leichhardt Oval following a pitch assessment.); Attendance: 1,494; Referee: Rebecca Durcau

8 December 2024 5	Western United	2–1	Sydney FC	Melbourne
17:00	Johnson 55'; De Domizio 88'	Report	Luchtmeijer 58'	Stadium: Ironbark Fields; Attendance: 515; Referee: Molly Godsell

14 December 2024 6	Western Sydney Wanderers	5–1	Western United	Sydney
16:50	Saveska 10', 24', 27'; Rue 38'; Matos 82'	Report	Logarzo 64' (pen.)	Stadium: CommBank Stadium; Attendance: 2,225; Referee: Casey Reibelt

22 December 2024 7	Central Coast Mariners	1–3	Western United	Gosford
17:00	Rasmussen 89'	Report	Johnson 57', 60'; Maher 87'	Stadium: Industree Group Stadium; Attendance: 965; Referee: Kelly Jones

29 December 2024 8	Western United	2–8	Brisbane Roar	Melbourne
19:45	Logarzo 30' (pen.); McQueen 73' (o.g.)	Report	S. Freier 9', 53'; Hayashi 17'; L. Freier 26', 48', 61'; Varley 32'; Yallop 70'	Stadium: Ironbark Fields; Attendance: 907; Referee: Caitlin Williams

3 January 2025 10	Western United	2–0	Newcastle Jets	Melbourne
19:00	Johnson 59', 78'	Report		Stadium: Ironbark Fields; Attendance: 531; Referee: Beth Rattray

11 January 2025 11	Canberra United	2–1	Western United	Canberra
17:00	Mihocic 21' (o.g.); Christopherson 50'	Report	Zimmerman 15'	Stadium: McKellar Park; Attendance: 1,766; Referee: Rebecca Durcau

17 January 2025 12	Western United	1–1	Melbourne City	Melbourne
19:35	Johnson 45'	Report	McNamara 83'	Stadium: Ironbark Fields; Attendance: 847; Referee: Caitlin Williams

21 January 2025 9	Western United	4–1	Perth Glory	Melbourne
19:00	Valletta 34' (o.g.); Maher 36'; M. Taranto 71'; Medwin 87'	Report	Hollar 81'	Stadium: Ironbark Fields; Attendance: 503; Referee: Molly Godsell

25 January 2025 13	Adelaide United	1–1	Western United	Adelaide
17:30	Healy 9'	Report	Zimmerman 61'	Stadium: Marden Sports Complex; Attendance: 786; Referee: Izzy Cooper

31 January 2025 14	Western United	4–1	Western Sydney Wanderers	Melbourne
19:00	Logarzo 3' (pen.); M. Taranto 7'; Eggesvik 35'; De Domizio 79'	Report	Saveska 39'	Stadium: Ironbark Fields; Attendance: 507; Referee: Izzy Cooper

5 February 2025 20	Melbourne City	5–1	Western United	Melbourne
17:00	McNamara 3', 36', 38'; Pollicina 59'; Bosch 71'	Report	Logarzo 26'	Stadium: ctrl:cyber Pitch; Attendance: 326; Referee: Rebecca Durcau
Note: Match originally scheduled for 23 March at 16:00 AEDT, but rescheduled for 4 February at 17:00 AEDT due to Melbourne City's participation in the 2024–25 AFC Women's Champions League. Match then rescheduled for 5 February, due to extreme heat forecast.

9 February 2025 15	Sydney FC	1–2	Western United	Sydney
17:00	Hawkesby 14'	Report	Logarzo 6'; Johnson 43'	Stadium: Leichhardt Oval; Attendance: 1,572; Referee: Rachael Mitchenson

16 February 2025 16	Brisbane Roar	0–0	Western United	Brisbane
18:00		Report		Stadium: Perry Park; Attendance: 2,356; Referee: Georgia Ghirardello

1 March 2025 17	Western United	1–2	Melbourne Victory	Melbourne
18:00	Gielnik 45' (o.g.)	Report	Furphy 10'; Morrison 47'	Stadium: Ironbark Fields; Attendance: 897; Referee: Izzy Cooper

7 March 2025 18	Perth Glory	3–0	Western United	Perth
22:00	Brown 14', 81'; Phonsongkham 86' (pen.)	Report		Stadium: Sam Kerr Football Centre; Attendance: 873; Referee: Georgia Ghirardello

14 March 2025 19	Western United	4–3	Canberra United	Melbourne
19:00	Hieda 50'; Zimmerman 63'; Ibarguen 82'; Ayson 89' (o.g.)	Report	Gordon 12'; Ayson 53'; Stanic-Floody 65'	Stadium: Ironbark Fields; Attendance: 503; Referee: Caitlin Williams

30 March 2025 21	Newcastle Jets	0–2	Western United	Newcastle
17:00		Report	Zimmerman 50'; Hieda 77'	Stadium: No.2 Sportsground; Attendance: 1,260; Referee: Rachael Mitchenson

12 April 2025 22	Western United	1–3	Adelaide United	Melbourne
16:00	Hieda 23'	Report	León 8', 55'; Morgan 14'	Stadium: Ironbark Fields; Attendance: 806; Referee: Georgia Ghirardello

20 April 2025 23	Wellington Phoenix	1–1	Western United	Wellington
14:00	Main 80'	Report	Eggesvik 75'	Stadium: Porirua Park; Referee: Beth Rattray

==== Finals series ====
27 April 2025 Elimination-final	Adelaide United	1–0	Western United	Adelaide
15:30	McNamara 24'	Report		Stadium: Coopers Stadium; Attendance: 3,143; Referee: Molly Godsell

== Statistics ==
=== Appearances and goals ===
Includes all competitions. Players with no appearances not included in the list.

As of match played 27 April 2025

No.	Pos	Nat	Player	Total		A-League Women		A-League Women Finals	
No.	Pos	Nat	Player	Apps	Goals	Apps	Goals	Apps	Goals
1	GK	(Australia) AUS	Alyssa Dall'Oste	9	0	8	0	1	0
2	MF	(Australia) AUS	Emily Roach	11	0	6+5	0	0	0
4	DF	(Australia) AUS	Claudia Mihocic	14	0	10+3	0	1	0
5	DF	(Australia) AUS	Aimee Medwin	23	2	18+4	2	0+1	0
6	MF	(Australia) AUS	Chloe Berryhill	22	7	21	7	1	0
7	FW	(Australia) AUS	Kiara De Domizio	19	2	0+18	2	0+1	0
8	MF	(Australia) AUS	Sasha Grove	24	0	23	0	1	0
9	MF	(Philippines) PHI	Sara Eggesvik	19	2	17+1	2	1	0
10	FW	(Australia) AUS	Kahli Johnson	18	8	18	8	0	0
11	FW	(Colombia) COL	Sandra Ibarguen	10	1	0+10	1	0	0
13	MF	(Australia) AUS	Avaani Prakash	11	0	1+9	0	0+1	0
15	MF	(Australia) AUS	Adriana Taranto	16	0	13+2	0	1	0
16	MF	(Australia) AUS	Melissa Taranto	20	2	14+5	2	1	0
18	DF	(Australia) AUS	Grace Maher	24	4	23	4	1	0
19	FW	(Australia) AUS	Alana Cortellino	5	0	0+5	0	0	0
20	MF	(Japan) JPN	Keiwa Hieda	17	3	10+6	3	0+1	0
22	DF	(Australia) AUS	Alana Cerne	11	0	8+3	0	0	0
24	DF	(Australia) AUS	Julia Sardo	20	0	16+3	0	1	0
28	DF	(Colombia) COL	Isabel Dehakiz	24	0	17+6	0	1	0
34	FW	(United States) USA	Catherine Zimmerman	17	5	15+1	5	1	0
36	GK	(Australia) AUS	Chloe Lincoln	15	0	15	0	0	0

=== Clean sheets ===
Includes all competitions. The list is sorted by squad number when total clean sheets are equal. Numbers in parentheses represent games where both goalkeepers participated and both kept a clean sheet; the number in parentheses is awarded to the goalkeeper who was substituted on, whilst a full clean sheet is awarded to the goalkeeper who was on the field at the start of play. Goalkeepers with no clean sheets not included in the list.

As of match played 27 April 2025

Rank	No.	Nat.	Goalkeeper	A-League Women	A-League Women Finals	Total
1	1	(Australia)	Alyssa Dall'Oste	2	0	2
2	36	(Australia)	Chloe Lincoln	2	0	2
Total				4	0	4

== See also ==
- 2024–25 Western United FC season
