= 2023 A-League Women grand final =

- Event: 2022–23 A-League Women
| Western United | Sydney FC |
| 0 | 4 |
- Date: 30 April 2023
- Venue: CommBank Stadium, Sydney
- Referee: Casey Reibelt
- Attendance: 9,519
- Weather: Cloudy

The 2023 A-League Women grand final was the 14th A-League Women Grand Final, the championship-deciding match of the Australian A-League Women, and the culmination of the 2022–23 season. The match was played between Western United and Sydney FC on 30 April 2023 at CommBank Stadium in Sydney.

The match was Western United's first A-League Women Grand Final in their inaugural season, and the ninth for Sydney FC, as well as six consecutive appearances in the A-League Women Grand Final. Sydney FC won 4–0 to claim their fourth championship in the A-League Women.

It was announced by the Australian Professional Leagues that the Grand Finals in 2023, 2024, and 2025 will be hosted in Sydney. The venue was confirmed on 20 February 2023 to take place at CommBank Stadium.

== Teams ==
| Team | Previous grand final appearances (bold indicates winners) |
|---|---|
| Western United | None |
| Sydney FC | 9 (**2009 (Dec.)**, 2011, **2013**, 2016, 2018, **2019**, 2020, 2021, 2022) |

== Route to the final ==
=== Western United ===
| Round | Western United | |
|---|---|---|
| Regular season | **2nd placed**: Pos / Team / Pld / Pts; 1 / Sydney FC (C) / 18 / **40**; **2** / Western United / **18** / **39**; 3 / Melbourne City / 18 / **30**; 4 / Melbourne Victory / 18 / **29**; 5 / Canberra United / 18 / **29**; Source: A-Leagues (C) Champions | |
| Semi-finals | Opponent | Score |
| Semi-finals | Sydney FC | 1–0 |

=== Sydney FC ===
| Round | Sydney FC | |
|---|---|---|
| Regular season | **1st placed / Premiers**: Pos / Team / Pld / Pts; **1** / Sydney FC (C) / **18** / **40**; 2 / Western United / 18 / **39**; 3 / Melbourne City / 18 / **30**; 4 / Melbourne Victory / 18 / **29**; 5 / Canberra United / 18 / **29**; Source: A-Leagues (C) Champions | |
| Semi-finals | Opponent | Score |
| Semi-finals | Western United | 0–1 |
| Preliminary Final | Opponent | Score |
| Preliminary Final | Melbourne Victory | 1–0 |

== Pre-match ==
=== Venue selection ===
The Grand Final will be held at CommBank Stadium in Sydney, coming from a move by the Australian Professional Leagues with a decision to give Sydney hosting rights to the 2023, 2024 and 2025 Grand Finals.

== Match ==
=== Details ===
30 April 2023
16:00 AEST (UTC+10:00)

| Western United | 0–4 | Sydney FC |
|---|---|---|
| | Report | Haley 4', 90+1'; Tobin 18'; Ibini 63' (pen.) |

CommBank Stadium, Sydney
Attendance: 9,519
Referee: Casey Reibelt

| **Western United** | **Sydney FC** |

| GK | 21 | (United States) Hillary Beall |
| RB | 2 | (Australia) Stacey Papadopoulos |
| CB | 20 | (Guyana) Sydney Cummings | (yellow card) 23' |
| CB | 22 | (Australia) Alana Cerne |
| LB | 19 | (Serbia) Tyla-Jay Vlajnic |
| CM | 11 | (Australia) Emma Robers |
| CM | 4 | (Philippines) Jaclyn Sawicki |
| CM | 15 | (Australia) Adriana Taranto |
| RW | 13 | (Canada) Danielle Steer | (substituted off) 55' |
| CF | 9 | (United States) Hannah Keane |
| LW | 10 | (Australia) Kahli Johnson | (substituted off) 81' |
Substitutes:
| GK | 1 | (Australia) Alyssa Dall'Oste |
| DF | 14 | (Australia) Natasha Dakic |
| DF | 24 | (Australia) Julia Sardo |
| DF | 25 | (Australia) Tiana Jaber | (substituted on) 81' |
| MF | 16 | (Australia) Melissa Taranto | (substituted on) 16' |
Head coach:
(Australia) Mark Torcaso

| GK | 1 | (Australia) Jada Whyman |
| RB | 19 | (Australia) Charlize Rule | (yellow card) 35' |
| CB | 3 | (Australia) Charlotte McLean |
| CB | 12 | (Australia) Natalie Tobin |
| LB | 5 | (Australia) Kirsty Fenton |
| CM | 8 | (Australia) Rachel Lowe |
| CM | 6 | (Australia) Sarah Hunter |
| CM | 15 | (Australia) Mackenzie Hawkesby |
| RW | 11 | (Australia) Cortnee Vine | (yellow card) 22' |
| CF | 9 | (United States) Madison Haley |
| LW | 20 | (Australia) Princess Ibini |
Substitutes:
| GK | 30 | (Australia) Katie Offer |
| DF | 16 | (Republic of Ireland) Deborah-Anne de la Harpe | (substituted on) 90+2' |
| FW | 21 | (Australia) Shay Hollman | (substituted on) 78' |
| FW | 22 | (Australia) Indiana Dos Santos | (substituted on) 88' |
| FW | 25 | (Australia) Rola Badawiya | (substituted on) 88' |
Head coach:
(Australia) Ante Juric

Assistant referees:
Park Mi-Suk
Maddie Allum
Fourth official:
Isabella Blaess

**Match rules**

- 90 minutes.
- 30 minutes of extra time if necessary.
- Penalty shoot-out if scores still level.
- Seven named substitutes.
- Maximum of four substitutions, with a fifth allowed in extra time.

== See also ==
- 2022–23 A-League Women
- 2022–23 Western United FC (A-League Women) season
