= 2022–23 Western United FC (women) season =

Western United (women)
2022–23 season
- Chairman: Jason Sourasis
- Head Coach: Mark Torcaso
- Stadium: City Vista Recreation Reserve
- A-League Women: 2nd
- A-League Women Finals: Runners-up
- Top goalscorer: League: Hannah Keane (13); All: Hannah Keane (14)
- Highest home attendance: 2,753 vs. Melbourne Victory (19 November 2022); A-League Women
- Lowest home attendance: 320 vs. Newcastle Jets (19 February 2023); A-League Women
- Average home league attendance: 995
- Biggest win: 5–0 vs. Canberra United (A) (28 January 2023); A-League Women
- Biggest defeat: 0–4 vs. Sydney FC (N) (30 April 2023); A-League Women Grand Final

The 2022–23 season was Western United Football Club (women)'s first season in the A-League Women.

City Vista Recreation Reserve was the home venue and training base for Western United during their inaugural season.

Coached by Mark Torcaso, Western United finished 2nd in the regular season and reached the Grand Final, losing 4–0 to Sydney FC.

== Review and events ==
=== Pre-season ===
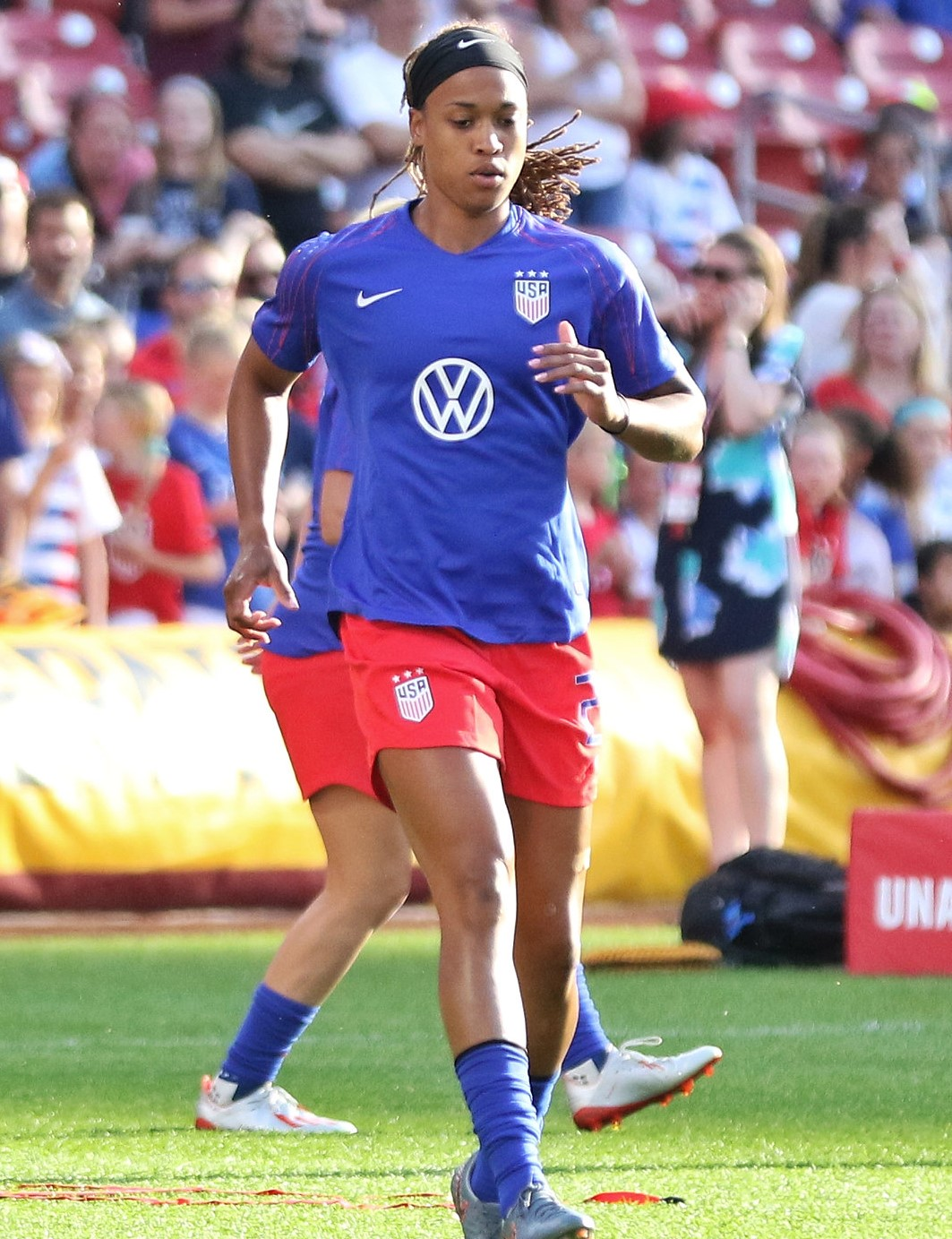
American international and FIFA Women's World Cup winner Jessica McDonald signed as a guest player in October 2022.

Mark Torcaso, previously the head coach of affiliated club Calder United, was appointed as the inaugural head coach for Western United on 29 June with Helen Winterburn appointed as assistant coach a month later.

The first player signing occurred on 4 August where Australian defender Alana Cerne signed for the season. Five days later, their first international signing was American striker Hannah Keane. Australian youth international Kahli Johnson signed on 10 August, Adriana and Melissa Taranto on 16 August, Filipino international Jaclyn Sawicki on 18 August, Emma Robers and Julia Sardo on 23 August Aleksandra Sinclair on 26 August, Francesca Iermano on 30 August, Alyssa Dall'Oste and Natasha Dakic on 1 September, Australian youth international Silver Bell Morris on 8 September, and Australian international Chloe Logarzo on 13 September.

Further key signings included Serbian international and four-time A-League Women champion Tyla-Jay Vlajnic, Harriet Withers, Raquel Deralas, and Stacey Papadopoulos. On 26 September, Kahli Johnson and Silver Bell Morris were called-up to an extended Australia under-20 squad.

American goalkeeper Hillary Beall signed for the season on loan from NWSL club Racing Louisville on 28 September, and Guyanese international Sydney Cummings signed ahead of the season from NWSL club San Diego Wave on 29 September. American international and FIFA Women's World Cup winner Jessica McDonald signed for Western United in a guest contract on 19 October.

On 3 November, Western United's first friendly was confirmed to play Melbourne Victory at Morshead Park Stadium in Ballarat in two days time. In the match, Western United won 1–0 through a late goal from Hannah Keane. Five days later, they played against Melbourne City in their last friendly before their first competitive match, winning 3–0 thanks to two goals from Hannah Keane, and one for Jessica McDonald.

=== November ===

Starting XI for A-League Women home match against Melbourne Victory on 19 November

Western United's first extended squad for the 2022–23 A-League Women opener against Melbourne Victory was confirmed two days prior with all but Harriet Withers and Nataska Dakic both injured. Jaclyn Sawicki was announced as captain. The match resulted in a 1–0 win for Western United with Jessica McDonald scoring the goal in front of 2,753 spectators; the highest home attendance for Western United (women). Four days later, Aimee Medwin signed a scholarship contract with Western United.

Ahead of Round 2's clash against Wellington Phoenix away, Natasha Dakic returned. During the week, Chloe Logarzo featured in episode 7 of the A-Leagues All Access docuseries of her return to club football after more than a year and behind-the-scenes of the previous week's match against Melbourne Victory. Western United won 4–1, heading to the top of the table after two rounds thanks to two goals by Hannah Keane, and one for Jessica McDonald and Sydney Cummings.

=== December ===
Aimee Medwin joined the squad heading into Round 3 against Adelaide United away; the match resulting in a 2–1 win, from a comeback of two late goals in stoppage time by Sydney Cummings in the 91st minute and Emma Robers in the 97th minute for three wins in three matches to start the campaign. Within this, Stacey Papadopoulos had suffered a concussion early in the match and was taken from the field by paramedics and taken to hospital for precautionary scans of which have all come back clear.

Western United were dropped to third place during their bye in Round 4. On 12 December, the Australian Professional Leagues (APL) announced that the 2023, 2024, and 2025 A-Leagues Grand Finals would be hosted in Sydney as part of a deal with Destination NSW in which the following day, the club issued a statement condemning the decision saying that they do not support it. Kahli Johnson made a return to the squad after a minor knee injury for Round 5's clash against Melbourne City away. Western United won 3–1, for their fourth consecutive win to start the campaign thanks to two goals from Chloe Logarzo and Adriana Taranto regaining top spot.

Round 7's match against the Newcastle Jets at home, originally scheduled for 28 December had been postponed to a later date due to extreme heat forecast in Victoria. An unchanged extended squad was confirmed heading to Round 8 against Perth Glory away.

=== January ===
Western United won 3–2 against Perth Glory away, with Hannah Keane, Chloe Logarzo, and a late own goal securing their fifth consecutive win of the first five matches to start the campaign. On 4 January, three fixture changes were confirmed:

The same day saw the signing of Canadian attacker Danielle Steer signing on for the remainder of the season. Ahead of Round 9's match against Wellington Phoenix at home, Tyla-Jay Vlajnic returned after missing out against Perth Glory the previous week. Western United won 1–0 for six consecutive wins to start the campaign with Tyla-Jay Vlajnic scoring the decisive goal. Two days later, Australian defender Angela Beard signed from Danish club Fortuna Hjørring on a two-year deal.

Danielle Steer entered the extended squad for Round 10 against Sydney FC, as Western United won 2–0 via a double from Hannah Keane moving back to the top of the table and extending the win streak to seven. On 12 January, Mark Torcaso was awarded the A-League Women Coach of the Month for December. Continuing in Round 10, their squad against the Western Sydney Wanderers away saw three major inclusions of Angela Beard, Jaclyn Sawicki, and Chloe Logarzo. The match resulted in a 2–1 loss; ending the run of seven consecutive wins to start the campaign with Hannah Keane scoring the goal.

Jessica McDonald was confirmed she would play her last match for Western United before the end of her guest stint from Racing Louisville, whilst Melissa Taranto returned to the squad to face Brisbane Roar at home after missing out in the previous match against Western Sydney Wanderers. Western United returning to winning ways in a 2–0 win over Brisbane Roar with Hannah Keane and Tyla-Jay Vlajnic scoring the goals.

On 24 January, a friendly was confirmed to take place in February against the Australia under-20 team as part of their training camp from 13–22 February in partnership with the Wyndham City Council. Western United won 5–0; their biggest win of the season with all goals scored in the first half by Hannah Keane scoring two, Danielle Steer, Melissa Taranto, and Sydney Cummings.

=== February ===
Julia Sardo and Francesca Iermano returned to the squad against Perth Glory at home at Morshead Park Stadium in Ballarat for the first time since the opening friendly of the season. It resulted in a 3–1 loss; their second of the season with Emma Robers scoring the goal. The squad remained unchanged ahead of the next fixture against the Newcastle Jets at home.

Kahli Johnson was called-up to the Australia under-20 squad on 8 February for a 10-day camp ahead of friendlies against Western United and Melbourne City. The squad remained unchanged ahead of the revised fixture against the Newcastle Jets at home, and fell to a second consecutive defeat in a 2–0 loss.

The squad was again unchanged heading into Round 14 against Melbourne City at home. Western United went back to winning ways in a comeback win after half-time; 2–1 over Melbourne City thanks to goals from Hannah Keane and Sydney Cummings. On 14 February, A-League Women awards for January were awarded to Mark Torcaso for Coach of the Month, and Hillary Beall for Player of the Month. On 22 February, Hannah Keane signed a contract extension on a further year. International representations occurred during the week with Jaclyn Sawicki playing for Philippines in the Pinatar Cup and Tyla-Jay Vlajnic playing for Serbia against Bosnia and Herzegovina and Slovakia, as both players returned without missing any Western United matches.

On 23 February, Aimee Medwin was confirmed an ACL injury in her knee during the friendly against the Australia under-20 team ruling her out in Round 15's squad to face the Newcastle Jets away whilst Silver Bell Morris, Natasha Dakic, and Aleksandra Sinclair entered the squad. In the lead-up to the match, Chloe Logarzo departed the club returning to parent club Kansas City Current after the end of her loan spell. Western United won 6–0 over the Newcastle Jets; setting their new biggest win record with Kahli Johnson and Tyla-Jay Vlajnic scoring two, and Danielle Steer and Hannah Keane scoring one. Two days later, Australian defender Tiana Jaber signed for the remainder of the season as an injury replacement deal for Aimee Medwin, whilst Kahli Johnson was again called up to the Australia under-20 squad.

=== March ===
The squad saw Silver Bell Morris, Francesca Iermano, and Tiana Jaber as Western United newest signing enter, whilst Kahli Johnson was out due to international duty for Round 16's top-of-the-table clash against Sydney FC away. The match resulted in a 3–0 loss as Sydney FC topped Western United on goal difference. Silver Bell Morris and Aleksandra Sinclair entered the squad in Round 17's clash against Brisbane Roar away, where Western United lost 2–0. This result was however overturned by the APL and was awarded a 3–0 win to Western United, due to Brisbane Roar fielding an ineligible player.

During the next week it was confirmed that Western United had qualified for the finals series and confirming a finish in the top two ensuring a double chance in the finals series. On 24 March, Chloe Logarzo returned to Western United exactly a month after her initial departure returning for the remainder of the 2022–23 season and the full 2023–24 season. Ahead of Round 19's clash against Canberra United at home, Stacey Papadopoulos returned from injury, Kahli Johnson returned from international duty, and Francesca Iermano entered as well. The match resulted in a 3–0 loss.

=== April ===

Starting XI for A-League Women Grand Final against Sydney FC on 30 April

The Round 20 final match against the Western Sydney Wanderers at home resulted in a 2–1 win via a double from Hannah Keane who she was confirmed the winner of the 2022–23 A-League Women Golden Boot as Western United finished the league season in second place to set up a semi-final match away against Sydney FC. The semi-final was confirmed to be played on 16 April at Allianz Stadium.

Ahead of the finals series, Jaclyn Sawicki and Kahli Johnson joined their national team camps with Sawicki for the Philippines in the 2024 AFC Women's Olympic Qualifying Tournament first round, and Johnson entering a week-long training camp with Australia U20. During the week of the semi-final, Chloe Logarzo returned to squad with Emma Robers returning from injury for the semi-final against Sydney FC. Western United won 1–0 through a first-half goal by Hannah Keane qualifying for the Grand Final on 30 April. to be held at CommBank Stadium as part of the Grand Final decision made back in December.

Five days after the semi-final match, Angela Beard who featured in the semi-final suffered a foot injury which confirmed her ruled out for the Grand Final. The extended squad was confirmed two days prior to the Grand Final, as Chloe Logarzo and Francesco Iermano entered, with Aleksandra Sinclair and Tiana Jaber promoted as Angela Beard was ruled out from her injury. Western United lost 4–0 in the Grand Final; their biggest defeat of the season, finishing the season as runners-up in both the regular season and finals series.

== Players ==
Note: Flags indicate national team as defined under FIFA eligibility rules; some limited exceptions apply. Players may hold more than one non-FIFA nationality.

No.	Pos.	Nation	Player
1	GK	AUS	Alyssa Dall'Oste
2	FW	AUS	Stacey Papadopoulos
3	DF	AUS	Silver Bell Morris (scholarship)
4	MF	PHI	Jaclyn Sawicki (captain)
5	DF	AUS	Aimee Medwin (scholarship)
7	FW	AUS	Francesca Iermano
9	FW	USA	Hannah Keane
10	FW	AUS	Kahli Johnson
11	MF	AUS	Emma Robers
12	FW	AUS	Harriet Withers
13	FW	CAN	Danielle Steer
14	DF	AUS	Natasha Dakic

No.	Pos.	Nation	Player
15	MF	AUS	Adriana Taranto
16	MF	AUS	Melissa Taranto
17	FW	AUS	Raquel Deralas (scholarship)
18	FW	AUS	Aleksandra Sinclair
19	DF	SRB	Tyla-Jay Vlajnic
20	DF	GUY	Sydney Cummings
21	GK	USA	Hillary Beall (vice-captain, on loan from Racing Louisville)
22	DF	AUS	Alana Cerne
23	DF	AUS	Angela Beard
24	DF	AUS	Julia Sardo
25	DF	AUS	Tiana Jaber (injury replacement)

== Transfers ==
=== Transfers in ===
No.	Position	Player	Transferred from	Type/fee	Contract length	Date	Ref
22	DF	Alana Cerne	(Australia) Calder United		2 years	4 August 2022	
9	FW	(United States) Hannah Keane	(Spain) Sporting de Huelva			9 August 2022	
10	FW	Kahli Johnson	Sydney FC			10 August 2022	
15	MF	Adriana Taranto	(Australia) Calder United		1 year	16 August 2022	
16	MF	Melissa Taranto	(Australia) Calder United		1 year	16 August 2022	
4	MF	(Philippines) Jaclyn Sawicki	Free agent			18 August 2022	
11	MF	Emma Robers	Melbourne Victory (Note: Off-season with Calder United.)			24 August 2022	
24	DF	Julia Sardo	(Australia) Calder United			24 August 2022	
18	FW	Aleksandra Sinclair	(Australia) Calder United		1 year	26 August 2022	
7	FW	Francesca Iermano	Melbourne Victory (Note: Off-season with South Melbourne.)		1 year	30 August 2022	
1	GK	Alyssa Dall'Oste	(Australia) Calder United		2 years	1 September 2022	
14	DF	Natasha Dakic	(Australia) Calder United		2 years	1 September 2022	
3	DF	Silver Bell Morris	(Australia) FV Emerging	Scholarship	2 years	8 September 2022	
6	MF	Chloe Logarzo	(United States) Kansas City Current	Loan		13 September 2022	
19	DF	(Serbia) Tyla-Jay Vlajnic	Melbourne City (Note: Off-season with Spartak Subotica.)		1 year	16 September 2022	
12	FW	Harriet Withers	Melbourne Victory			21 September 2022	
17	FW	Raquel Deralas	(Australia) Calder United	Scholarship		21 September 2022	
2	FW	Stacey Papadopoulos	(Australia) Calder United			21 September 2022	
21	GK	(United States) Hillary Beall	(United States) Racing Louisville	Loan	1 year	28 September 2022	
20	DF	(Guyana) Sydney Cummings	(United States) San Diego Wave		1 year	29 September 2022	
8	FW	(United States) Jessica McDonald	(United States) Racing Louisville	Loan (guest player)	3 months	19 October 2022	
5	DF	Aimee Medwin	(United States) Long Beach State Beach	Scholarship		23 November 2022	
13	FW	(Canada) Danielle Steer	(Canada) UBC Thunderbirds		4 months	4 January 2023	
23	DF	Angela Beard	(Denmark) Fortuna Hjørring		2 years	9 January 2023	
25	DF	Tiana Jaber	Unattached	Injury replacement (for Aimee Medwin)	4 months	28 February 2023	

=== Transfers out ===
No.	Position	Player	Transferred to	Type/fee	Date	Ref.
8	FW	(United States) Jessica McDonald	(United States) Racing Louisville	End of loan	22 January 2023	
6	MF	Chloe Logarzo	(United States) Kansas City Current	End of loan	24 February 2023	

== Pre-season and friendlies ==
5 November 2022	Western United (Australia)	1–0	(Australia) Melbourne Victory	Ballarat
	Keane 89'	Report		Stadium: Morshead Park Stadium

10 November 2022	Melbourne City (Australia)	0–3	(Australia) Western United	Melbourne
		Report	Keane 33', 49'; McDonald 35'	Stadium: Casey Fields

20 February 2023	Western United (Australia)	0–3	(Australia) Young Matildas	Melbourne
10:00 AEDT		Report	? (?); ? (?); ? (?)	Stadium: Galvin Park

== Competitions ==
Competition	First match	Last match	Starting round	Final position	Record							
Competition	First match	Last match	Starting round	Final position	Pld	W	D	L	GF	GA	GD	Win %
A-League Women	19 November 2022	1 April 2023	Matchday 1	2nd	18	12	0	6	35	22	+13	66.67
A-League Women Finals	16 April 2023	30 April 2023	Semi-finals	Runners-up	2	1	0	1	1	4	−3	50.00
Total					20	13	0	7	36	26	+10	65.00

Source: Soccerway

=== A-League Women ===
==== League table ====
Pos	Team	Pld	W	D	L	GF	GA	GD	Pts	Qualification
1	Sydney FC (C)	18	13	1	4	43	15	+28	40	Qualification to Finals series and 2023 AFC Women's Club Championship
2	Western United (Note: The APL awarded Western United a 3–0 win as a result of Brisbane Roar fielding an ineligible player, after the round 17 match had originally finished 2–0 for Brisbane.)	18	13	0	5	38	20	+18	39	Qualification to Finals series
3	Melbourne City	18	9	3	6	36	23	+13	30	Qualification to Finals series
4	Melbourne Victory	18	7	8	3	29	22	+7	29	Qualification to Finals series
5	Canberra United	18	8	5	5	35	30	+5	29	

Source: A-Leagues
Rules for classification: 1) points; 2) goal difference; 3) number of goals scored.
(C) Champions

==== Results summary ====
Overall								Home						Away					
Pld	W	D	L	GF	GA	GD	Pts	W	D	L	GF	GA	GD	W	D	L	GF	GA	GD
18	13	0	5	38	20	+18	39	6	0	3	11	10	+1	7	0	2	27	10	+17

Source: A-Leagues

==== Results by round ====
Round	1	2	3	4	5	6	8	9	10	10	11	12	13	7	14	15	16	17	18	19	20
Ground	H	A	A	B	A	B	A	H	H	A	H	A	H	H	H	A	A	A	B	H	H
Result	W	W	W	B	W	B	W	W	W	L	W	W	L	L	W	W	L	W	B	L	W
Position	3	1	1	3	1	3	3	2	1	1	1	1	1	1	1	1	2	2	1	1	2
Points	3	6	9	9	12	12	15	18	21	21	24	27	27	27	30	33	33	36	36	36	39

Source: A-Leagues
A = Away; H = Home; W = Win; D = Draw; L = Loss

==== Matches ====
Win Draw Loss

19 November 2022 1	Western United	1–0	Melbourne Victory	Melbourne
15:00 AEDT	McDonald 54'	Report		Stadium: City Vista Recreation Reserve; Attendance: 2,753; Referee: Lara Lee

26 November 2022 2	Wellington Phoenix	1–4	Western United	Wellington
15:00 NZDT	van der Meer 23'	Report	McDonald 16'; Cummings 71'; Keane 77', 82'	Stadium: Sky Stadium; Attendance: 1,541; Referee: Bec Mackie

4 December 2022 3	Adelaide United	1–2	Western United	Adelaide
15:30 ACDT	Dawber 56'	Report	Cummings 90+1'; Robers 90+7'	Stadium: ServiceFM Stadium; Attendance: 1,013; Referee: Lara Lee

17 December 2022 5	Melbourne City	1–3	Western United	Melbourne
17:10 AEDT	Ekic 28'	Report	A. Taranto 2'; Logarzo 64', 90+6' (pen.)	Stadium: AAMI Park; Attendance: 5,392; Referee: Kate Jacewicz

1 January 2023 8	Perth Glory	2–3	Western United	Perth
16:00 AWST	Baisden 7'; Lowry 53'	Report	Keane 17'; Logarzo 67'; Koulizakis 86' (o.g.)	Stadium: Macedonia Park; Attendance: 700; Referee: Caitlin Williams

7 January 2023 9	Western United	1–0	Wellington Phoenix	Melbourne
15:00 AEDT	Vlajnic 78'	Report		Stadium: City Vista Recreation Reserve; Attendance: 630; Referee: Rebecca Durcau

11 January 2023 10	Western United	2–0	Sydney FC	Melbourne
17:00 AEDT	Keane 18', 35'	Report		Stadium: City Vista Recreation Reserve; Attendance: 740; Referee: Kate Jacewicz

14 January 2023 10	Western Sydney Wanderers	2–1	Western United	Sydney
15:00 AEDT	Bolden 12'; Harrison 53'	Report	Keane 26'	Stadium: Wanderers Football Park; Attendance: 448; Referee: Kelly Jones

21 January 2023 11	Western United	2–0	Brisbane Roar	Hobart
14:20 AEDT	Keane 47'; Vlajnic 56'	Report		Stadium: North Hobart Oval; Attendance: 2,050; Referee: Georgia Ghirardello

28 January 2023 12	Canberra United	0–5	Western United	Canberra
15:00 AEDT		Report	Steer 5'; M. Taranto 13'; Keane 28', 39'; Cummings 42'	Stadium: McKellar Park; Attendance: 970; Referee: Rebecca Durcau

4 February 2023 13	Western United	1–3	Perth Glory	Ballarat
15:00 AEDT	Robers 22'	Report	Phonsongkham 11' (pen.); Jancevski 73'; Blake 90+6'	Stadium: Morshead Park Stadium; Attendance: 545; Referee: Caitlin Williams

8 February 2023 7	Western United	0–2	Newcastle Jets	Ballarat
17:30		Report	King 38'; Brodigan 47'	Stadium: Morshead Park Stadium; Attendance: 320; Referee: Isabella Libri

11 February 2023 14	Western United	2–1	Melbourne City	Melbourne
14:20 AEDT	Keane 48'; Cummings 86' (pen.)	Report	McKenna 40'	Stadium: AAMI Park; Attendance: 1,150; Referee: Anna-Marie Keighley

26 February 2023 15	Newcastle Jets	0–6	Western United	Newcastle
16:00 AEDT		Report	Johnson 6', 34'; Vlajnic 38', 44'; Steer 55'; Keane 78'	Stadium: Newcastle No.2 Sportsground; Attendance: 910; Referee: Bec Mackie

5 March 2023 16	Sydney FC	3–0	Western United	Sydney
16:00 AEDT	Lowe 51', 64'; Ibini 81'	Report		Stadium: Netstrata Jubilee Stadium; Attendance: 566; Referee: Lara Lee

11 March 2023 17	Brisbane Roar	0–3 (Note: The APL awarded Western United a 3–0 win as a result of Brisbane Roar fielding an ineligible player, after the match had originally finished 2–0 for Brisbane.)	Western United	Brisbane
15:00 AEDT	Connors 18', 90+2'	Report		Stadium: Perry Park; Attendance: 751; Referee: Georgia Ghirardello

25 March 2023 19	Western United	0–3	Canberra United	Melbourne
15:00 AEDT		Report	Milivojević 1', 65'; Wu 74'	Stadium: City Vista Recreation Reserve; Attendance: 404; Referee: Isabella Blaess

1 April 2023 20	Western United	2–1	Western Sydney Wanderers	Melbourne
15:00 AEDT	Keane 23', 55'	Report	Saveska 80'	Stadium: City Vista Recreation Reserve; Attendance: 361; Referee: Rebecca Durcau

==== Finals series ====
16 April 2023 Qualifying final	Sydney FC	0–1	Western United	Sydney
17:45 AEST		Report	Keane 26'	Stadium: Allianz Stadium; Attendance: 3,680; Referee: Georgia Ghirardello

30 April 2023 Grand final	Western United	0–4	Sydney FC	Sydney
16:00 AEST		Report	Haley 4', 90+1'; Tobin 18'; Ibini 63' (pen.)	Stadium: CommBank Stadium; Attendance: 9,519; Referee: Casey Reibelt

== Statistics ==
=== Appearances and goals ===
Includes all competitions. Players with no appearances not included in the list.

No.	Pos	Nat	Player	Total		A-League Women Regular season		A-League Women Finals series	
No.	Pos	Nat	Player	Apps	Goals	Apps	Goals	Apps	Goals
1	GK	(Australia) AUS	Alyssa Dall'Oste	1	0	0+1	0	0	0
2	DF	(Australia) AUS	Stacey Papadopoulos	12	0	8+2	0	2	0
4	DF	(Philippines) PHI	Jaclyn Sawicki	14	0	8+4	0	1+1	0
5	DF	(Australia) AUS	Aimee Medwin	9	0	7+2	0	0	0
6	MF	(Australia) AUS	Chloe Logarzo	6	3	0+6	3	0	0
7	DF	(Australia) AUS	Francesca Iermano	9	0	3+6	0	0	0
9	FW	(United States) USA	Hannah Keane	20	14	18	13	2	1
10	FW	(Australia) AUS	Kahli Johnson	17	2	9+6	2	2	0
11	MF	(Australia) AUS	Emma Robers	19	2	14+3	2	2	0
13	FW	(Canada) CAN	Danielle Steer	14	2	5+7	2	1+1	0
14	DF	(Australia) AUS	Natasha Dakic	11	0	2+8	0	0+1	0
15	MF	(Australia) AUS	Adriana Taranto	20	1	17+1	1	2	0
16	MF	(Australia) AUS	Melissa Taranto	19	1	16+1	1	1+1	0
18	FW	(Australia) AUS	Aleksandra Sinclair	8	0	1+7	0	0	0
19	DF	(Serbia) SRB	Tyla-Jay Vlajnic	18	4	14+2	4	2	0
20	DF	(Guyana) GUY	Sydney Cummings	20	4	18	4	2	0
21	GK	(Australia) AUS	Hillary Beall	20	0	18	0	2	0
22	DF	(Australia) AUS	Alana Cerne	19	0	16+1	0	2	0
23	DF	(Australia) AUS	Angela Beard	12	0	9+2	0	1	0
24	DF	(Australia) AUS	Julia Sardo	11	0	6+4	0	0+1	0
25	DF	(Australia) AUS	Tiana Jaber	3	0	0+2	0	0+1	0
Player(s) transferred out but featured this season
8	FW	(United States) USA	Jessica McDonald	9	0	9	0	0	0

=== Disciplinary record ===
Includes all competitions. The list is sorted by squad number when total cards are equal. Players with no cards not included in the list.

No.	Pos	Nat	Player	Total			A-League Women Regular season			A-League Women Finals series		
No.	Pos	Nat	Player	Yellow card	Second yellow card	Red card	Yellow card	Second yellow card	Red card	Yellow card	Second yellow card	Red card
11	MF	(Australia) AUS	Emma Robers	4	0	0	4	0	0	0	0	0
16	MF	(Australia) AUS	Melissa Taranto	3	0	0	2	0	0	1	0	0
20	DF	(Guyana) GUY	Sydney Cummings	3	0	0	2	0	0	1	0	0
22	MF	(Australia) AUS	Alana Cerne	3	0	0	3	0	0	0	0	0
2	DF	(Australia) AUS	Stacey Papadopoulos	2	0	0	2	0	0	0	0	0
5	DF	(Australia) AUS	Aimee Medwin	2	0	0	2	0	0	0	0	0
9	FW	(United States) USA	Hannah Keane	2	0	0	1	0	0	1	0	0
10	FW	(Australia) AUS	Kahli Johnson	2	0	0	2	0	0	0	0	0
23	DF	(Philippines) PHI	Angela Beard	2	0	0	2	0	0	0	0	0
24	DF	(Australia) AUS	Julia Sardo	2	0	0	2	0	0	0	0	0
6	MF	(Australia) AUS	Chloe Logarzo	1	0	0	1	0	0	0	0	0
7	DF	(Australia) AUS	Francesca Iermano	1	0	0	1	0	0	0	0	0
15	MF	(Australia) AUS	Adriana Taranto	1	0	0	1	0	0	0	0	0
18	FW	(Australia) AUS	Aleksandra Sinclair	1	0	0	1	0	0	0	0	0
19	DF	(Serbia) SRB	Tyla-Jay Vlajnic	1	0	0	1	0	0	0	0	0
21	GK	(United States) USA	Hillary Beall	1	0	0	1	0	0	0	0	0

- (yellow card) = Number of bookings; (second yellow card) = Number of sending offs after a second yellow card; (red card) = Number of sending offs by a direct red card.

== Awards ==
=== Western United ===
Award	Player	Ref.
2022–23 Player of the Season	(United States) Hillary Beall	

=== A-League Women ===
Award	Player	Ref.
2022–23 Coach of the Year	(Australia) Mark Torcaso	
2022–23 Goalkeeper of the Year	(United States) Hillary Beall	
2022–23 Save of the Year	(United States) Hillary Beall	
2022–23 Golden Boot	(United States) Hannah Keane	

=== Professional Footballers Australia ===
Award	Player	Ref.
2022–23 Team of the Season	(United States) Hillary Beall	
2022–23 Team of the Season	(United States) Hannah Keane	
