= Western United FC Player of the Season =

Award

Western United Player of the Season
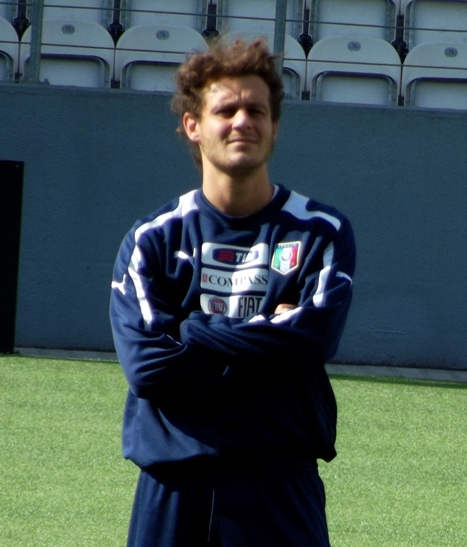
- Alessandro Diamanti was the first men's award winner.
- Sport: Association football
- Awarded for: being the best performing Western United player over the course of a season
- Presented by: Western United FC

History
- First award: 2020; 6 years ago (men's); 2023; 3 years ago (women's)
- Editions: 6 (men's) / 3 (women's) (as of 2026)
- First winner: (Italy) Alessandro Diamanti (men's) (United States) Hillary Beall (women's)
- Most recent: (Australia) Angus Thurgate (men's) (United States) Catherine Zimmerman (women's)

The Western United Player of the Season award is an official award given by Western United Football Club to the best performing player (men's and women's) from the club over the course of the season.

The inaugural men's award was handed to Alessandro Diamanti in 2020, and the inaugural women's award was handed to Hillary Beall in 2023.

Angus Thurgate is the most recent men's winner of the award, following the 2024–25 men's season and Catherine Zimmerman is the most recent women's winner of the award, following the 2024–25 women's season.

== Men's award recipients ==
Players in bold are still playing for Western United

Men's award recipients
Season	Player	Nationality	Position	Ref.
2019–20	Alessandro Diamanti	Italy	Midfielder	
2020–21	Tomoki Imai	Japan	Defender	
2021–22	Ben Garuccio	Australia	Defender	
2022–23	Josh Risdon	Australia	Defender	
2023–24	Daniel Penha	Brazil	Midfielder	
2024–25	Angus Thurgate	Australia	Midfielder	

=== Wins by nationality ===
Wins by nationality
Nationality	Wins
Australia	3
Brazil	1
Italy	1
Japan	1

=== Wins by playing position ===
Wins by playing position
Position	Wins
Goalkeeper	0
Defender	3
Midfielder	3
Forward	0

== Women's award recipients ==
Players in bold are still playing for Western United

Women's award recipients
Season	Player	Nationality	Position	Ref.
2022–23	Hillary Beall	United States	Goalkeeper	
2023–24	Chloe Logarzo	Australia	Midfielder	
2024–25	Catherine Zimmerman	United States	Forward	

=== Wins by nationality ===
Wins by nationality
Nationality	Wins
United States	2
Australia	1

=== Wins by playing position ===
Wins by playing position
Position	Wins
Goalkeeper	1
Defender	0
Midfielder	1
Forward	1

== See also ==
- List of Western United FC players
- List of Western United FC (A-League Women) players
