= Kathrine Larsen =

Danish footballer (born 1993)

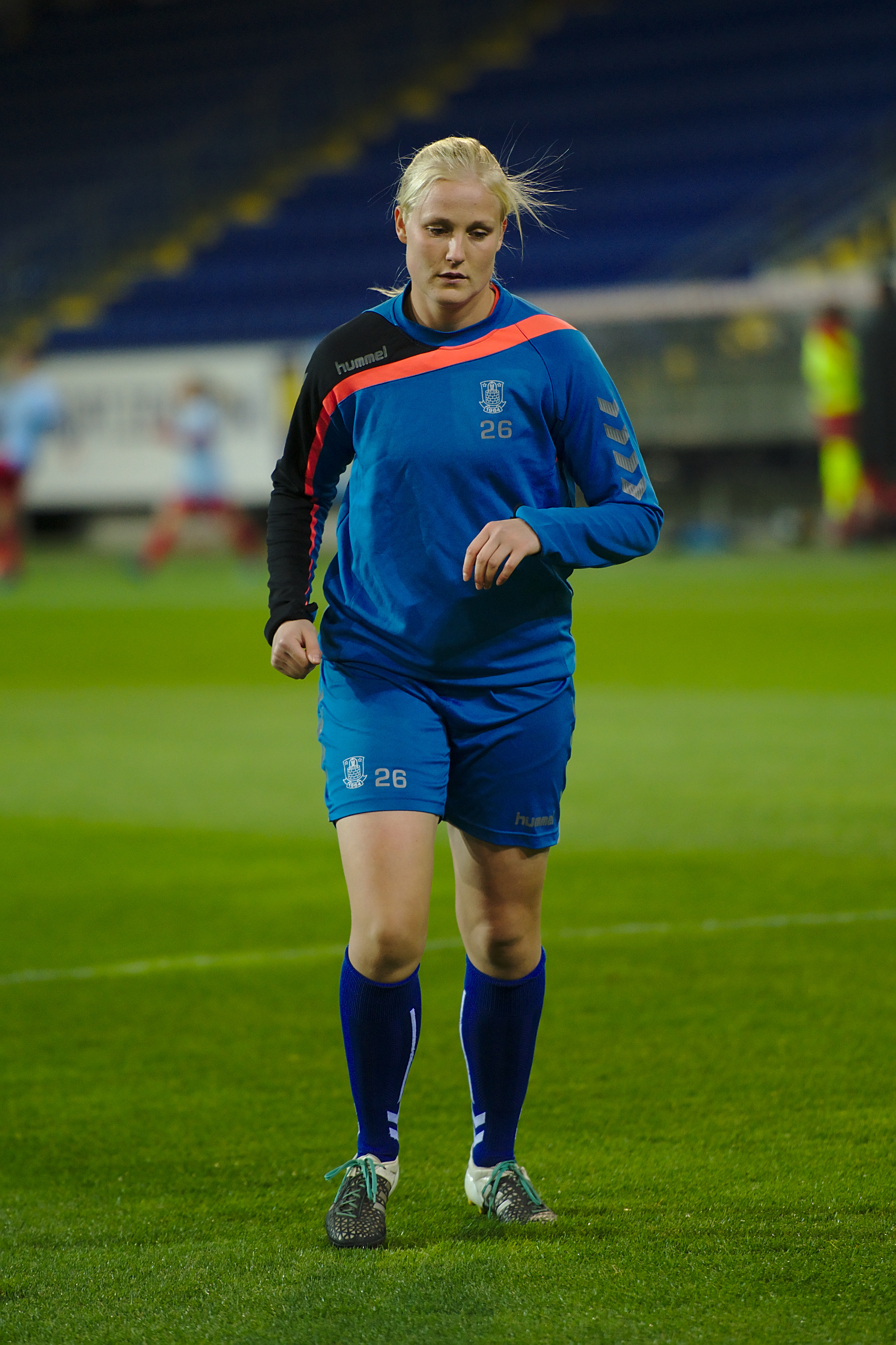
- Larsen with Brøndby IF in 2016

Personal information
- Full name: Kathrine Østergaard Larsen
- Date of birth: 5 May 1993 (age 33)
- Place of birth: Albertslund, Denmark
- Height: 1.81 m (5 ft 11 in)
- Position: Goalkeeper

Youth career
- 1999–2009: Herstedøster
- 2009–2012: BSF

College career
Years	Team	Apps	(Gls)
2012	Pacific Tigers	12	(0)

Senior career*
Years	Team	Apps	(Gls)
2011–2012	BSF	3	(0)
2013–2015	BSF		
2016–2018	Brøndby IF	12	(0)
2019–2020	FC Nordsjælland	23	(0)
2020	Djurgårdens IF	18	(0)
2021	Klepp IL	18	(0)
2022	Hammarby IF	5	(0)
2022–2023	Brøndby IF	23	(0)
2024	Western United	2	(0)
2024	Malmö FF	27	(0)
2025	Sampdoria	7	(0)

International career
2011–2012	Denmark U19	8	(0)
2015–2016	Denmark U23	2	(0)
2020–2025	Denmark	8	(0)
- * Club domestic league appearances and goals

Kathrine Østergaard Larsen (born 5 May 1993) is a Danish former professional footballer who played as a goalkeeper for the Denmark national team. Larsen had a versatile career, playing in her home country, and Scandinavian neighbours Sweden and Norway, as well as in Australia and Italy. She earned 8 caps and 5 clean sheets over 5 years with the national team from 2020 to 2025.

== Club career ==
During her teenage years, she played, among other things, for Ballerup-Skovlunde Fodbold. In 2015, she switched to Brøndby IF. In 2019 she played for FC Nordsjælland and in 2020 she played for Djurgårdens IF in Damallsvenskan. In 2021, she switched to the Norwegian club Klepp IL, who play in the Toppserien.

In February 2024, Larsen joined Australian club Western United until the end of the 2023–24 A-League Women season.

== International career ==
Larsen made her debut for Denmark in an Algarve Cup fixture against Sweden. She made a close-range save from a Lina Hurtig shot in a 2–1 victory for the Danes. She played her second international match on 21 October 2020, when Denmark beat Israel 4–0 at home.

== Career statistics ==
=== International ===
As of match played 4 April 2025

Appearances and goals by national team and year
National team	Year	Apps	Goals
Denmark	2020	2	0
Denmark	2021	1	0
Denmark	2022	3	0
Denmark	2023	2	0
Denmark	2024	0	0
Denmark	2025	0	0
Total		8	0
