= Silver Bell Morris =

Australian soccer player (born 2004)

Personal information
- Date of birth: 16 March 2004 (age 22)
- Place of birth: Myanmar
- Position: Defender

Youth career
- FV Emerging

Senior career*
| Years | Team | Apps | (Gls) |
| 2022–2024 | Western United | 0 | (0) |

International career
| 2022 | Australia U18 | | |
- * Club domestic league appearances and goals

Silver Bell Morris (born 16 March 2004) is a soccer player who last played as a defender for Western United. Born in Myanmar, she is an Australia youth international.

== Early life ==
Morris was born in Myanmar and moved to Australia in 2013.

== Education ==
Morris attended Kennington Primary School in Australia.

== Club career ==
Morris started her career with Australian side FV Emerging, helping the club reach the finals of the NPLW Victoria for the first time. She has been regarded as an Australian prospect.

== International career ==
Morris has represented Australia internationally at youth level, helping the under-18 team win the 2022 AFF U-18 Women's Championship.

== Style of play ==
Morris mainly operates as a defender and is known for her strength and aerial ability.

== Personal life ==
Morris has a brother.
