= Alana Černe =

Australian soccer player (born 2002)

Personal information
- Date of birth: 11 December 2002 (age 23)
- Place of birth: Melbourne, Victoria, Australia
- Positions: Defender; midfielder

Youth career
- Fawkner

Senior career*
Years	Team	Apps	(Gls)
2017–2018	FFV NTC		
2019, 2022	Calder United		
2022–2025	Western United	53	(1)
2025	Essendon Royals		
2025–2026	Western Sydney Wanderers	16	(0)

International career^{‡}
2024–	Australia U23	4	(1)
- * Club domestic league appearances and goals as of 29 March 2026 ‡ National team caps and goals as of 19 August 2025

Alana Černe (born 11 December 2002) is an Australian soccer player who last played as a defender or midfielder for A-League Women club Western Sydney Wanderers and the Australia women's national under-23 soccer team. She previously played for A-League Women club Western United.

== Early years ==
Černe was born in Melbourne in 2002; she grew up in the suburb of Fawkner with a sibling. She began playing soccer from the age of five or six. Her mother was unsuccessful in talking her into netball. At age seven Černe followed a primary school friend to training sessions. Her junior years were spent at Fawkner SC alongside boys, where she was "playing all kinds of position, including goalkeeper."

== Club career ==
Černe joined Football Federation Victoria National Training Centre (FFV NTC) in 2017, which competed in the National Premier Leagues Victoria Women (NPL Victoria). She transferred to Calder United in 2019 in the NPL Victoria, which won both the Premiership and Championship. The 2020 and 2021 seasons were cancelled due to the COVID-19 pandemic in Australia. Černe continued with Calder when the NPL Victoria resumed in 2022, once again the team were Premiers and Champions. She had kicked five goals during regular season and one more in the grand final. The defender was awarded the NPL Victoria Player of the Year Medal.

Černe was the first woman signed with newly established A-League Women's team, Western United on 4 August 2022 for their 2022–23 season. During the regular season she made 17 appearances, which helped her team to second place on the Premiership table and two finals appearances to become Championship runners-up.

During Western United's 2023–24 regular season, Černe appeared 22 times, her team finished in third place on the league table. She scored a goal in their elimination final 2–4 loss against Newcastle Jets during April 2024. After achieving 50 A-League appearances with Western United, Černe was unavailable due to injury for portions of the 2024–25 season resulting in 11 appearances. After A-League duties ended in the off-season she played in the NPL Victoria team, Essendon Royals. In October 2025 she signed with Western Sydney Wanderers ahead of the A-League's 2025–26 season. Černe appeared 16 times in her first season for the Wanderers. Cerne departed the club in August 2026, following the conclusion of her contract.

== International career ==
Australia women's national under-20 soccer team (Young Matildas) coach Leah Blayney offered Černe a scholarship with a Future Matildas program in 2023. She received additional training sessions after Western United's season ended. Coach Melissa Andreatta named Černe to the Australia women's national under-23 soccer team (U23 Matildas) squad for the U-23 Women's National Team Four Nations Tournament, held in Växjö, Sweden during 30 May–4 June 2024. She kicked a goal on debut against Poland U23. Australia U23 had come from 2–0 behind to draw 2–2 at full-time with Černe's goal followed by Anna Margraf's equaliser. In the resulting penalty shoot-out U23 Matildas won 5–3.

At the 2025 ASEAN Women's Championship in Vietnam in August, Černe returned to the Australia U23 squad under new coach, Joe Palatsides. They competed against senior national teams in Group B. She help defend Australia's goal for clean sheets in their victories against Philippines (1–0) and Timor Leste (9–0) to reach the semi-finals. Australia U23 were crowned champions after defeating Myanmar (1–0) in the final.
