= Adriana Taranto =

Australian soccer player

Personal information
- Full name: Adriana Taranto
- Date of birth: 22 March 1999 (age 27)
- Place of birth: Australia
- Position: Midfielder

Team information
- Current team: Adelaide United
- Number: 15

Senior career*
Years	Team	Apps	(Gls)
2015	FFV NTC		
2015–2016	Melbourne Victory	8	(0)
2016	Geelong Galaxy		
2016–2017	Melbourne Victory	10	(0)
2017–2018	Geelong Galaxy		
2019–2022	Calder United	13	(5)
2022–2025	Western United	39	(6)
2025–	Adelaide United	13	(0)

International career^{‡}
2014–2016	Australia U17	2	(1)
2025–	Australia	2	(0)
- * Club domestic league appearances and goals as of 2 February 2026 ‡ National team caps and goals as of 10 July 2025

Adriana Taranto (/ˌeɪdriˈɑːnə/, Italian: [adriˈaːna ˈtaːranto]; born 22 March 1999) is an Australian soccer player who plays for Adelaide United in the Australian A-League Women and for the Australia national team. She has also played for Geelong Galaxy United in the National Premier Leagues Victoria Women. Taranto has previously represented Australia on the Australia women's national under-17 soccer team.

== Early years ==
Adriana Taranto and her twin sister Melissa were born in Melbourne in 1999. Both undertook careers in soccer. Their older brother, Anthony played soccer for Northcote City FC in 2016. As a junior Taranto started playing for Moreland Wolves alongside her twin.

== Club career ==
Taranto and her twin sister played for Football Federation Victoria National Training Centre (FFV NTC) in the National Premier Leagues Victoria Women (NPL Victoria) during 2015.

=== Melbourne Victory (2015–2017) ===
Taranto signed with Melbourne Victory as a midfielder in 2015 in the W-League (later known as A-League Women). She made her debut on 17 October 2015 in a match against Perth Glory. She made eight appearances for the team during the 2015–16 W-League season. Victory finished in ninth place during the regular season with a 2–9–1 record. During the W-League off season, she played for Geelong Galaxy United in the NPL Victoria. Taranto returned to Victory for the 2016–17 W-League season with ten more appearances.

=== Geelong Galaxy, Calder United (2016–2022) ===
After leaving Melbourne Victory, Taranto continued with Geelong Galaxy into 2018. Subsequently, the midfielder played for Calder United in NPL Victoria from 2019 to 2022 before returning to the A-League Women by joining Western United.

=== Western United (2022–2025) ===
The midfielder was signed by Western United FC for 2022–23 season and provided 1 goal from 20 appearances. In her second season (2023–24) with that team, she scored five goals from 19 appearances. Taranto made 16 more appearances during 2024–25 despite being injured from April to July 2025.

=== Adelaide United (2025–) ===
In September 2025, Taranto joined Adelaide United on a one-year deal, together with her twin sister Melissa.

== International career ==
Taranto (and her sister) represented Australia in the Australia women's national under-17 soccer team (Junior Matildas). In October 2014, Taranto scored the first goal in their 6–0 win against Vietnam in a Group C game at the 2015 AFC U-16 Championship qualifiers, held in Malaysia. After their 0–1 defeat by South Korea they were eliminated.

The midfielder played for the Australia national team (Matildas) in two friendly matches against Panama in Bunbury, Western Australia and Perth in July 2025.

== Personal life ==
Taranto is the twin sister of fellow soccer midfielder, Melissa Taranto.
