= Jaclyn Sawicki =

Canadian-Filipino footballer (born 1992)

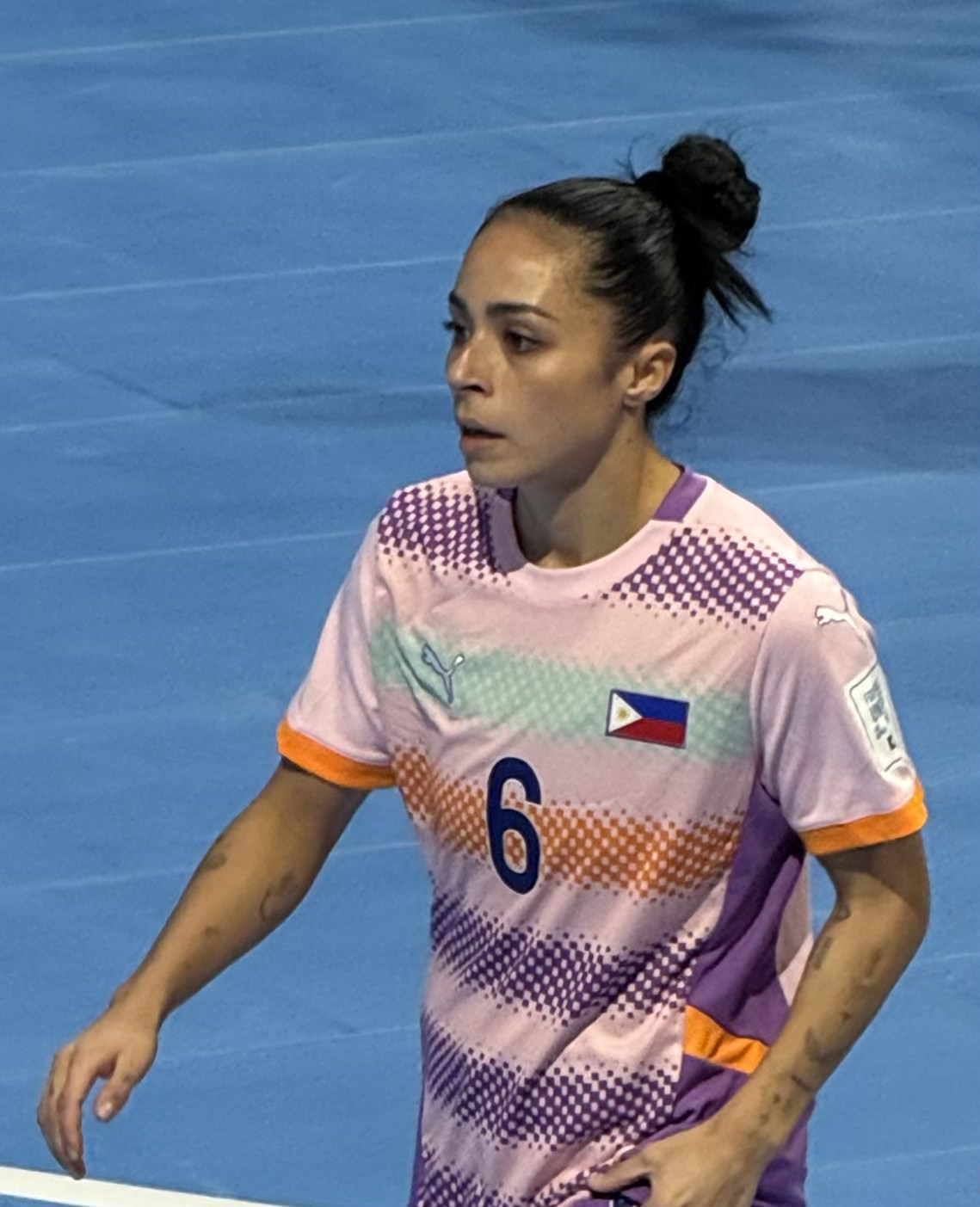
- Sawicki at the 2025 FIFA Futsal Women's World Cup

Personal information
- Full name: Jaclyn Katrina Demis Sawicki
- Date of birth: November 14, 1992 (age 34)
- Place of birth: Coquitlam, British Columbia, Canada
- Height: 5 ft 2 in (1.58 m)
- Position: Midfielder

Team information
- Current team: Calgary Wild
- Number: 6

Youth career
- Coquitlam Metro-Ford SC
- Vancouver Whitecaps

College career
Years	Team	Apps	(Gls)
2010–2014	Victoria Vikes	71	(16)

Senior career*
Years	Team	Apps	(Gls)
2011–2012	Vancouver Whitecaps	10	(2)
2016–2017	North Shore Girls SC	14	(2)
2017–2018	Chifure AS Elfen Saitama	3	(1)
2018–2019	Assi	49	(5)
2022–2024	Western United	32	(1)
2025–	Calgary Wild	35	(1)

International career^{‡}
2011–2013	Canada Universiade		
2012	Canada U20	6	(2)
2011	Canada	1	(0)
2022–	Philippines	52	(2)
2025–	Philippines (futsal)	4	(0)
Medal record
Women's football
Representing the Philippines
AFF Women's Championship
Winner	2022 Philippines	Team
Southeast Asian Games
Gold medal – first place	2025 Thailand	Team
Bronze medal – third place	2021 Vietnam	Team
- * Club domestic league appearances and goals as of October 28, 2026 ‡ National team caps and goals as of September 25, 2026

Jaclyn Katrina Demis Sawicki (born November 14, 1992) is a professional footballer who plays as a midfielder for Calgary Wild in the Northern Super League. Born and raised in Canada, she represents the Philippines at the international level, after previously representing Canada at both youth and senior level.

== Early life ==
Sawicki began playing youth soccer at age 7 with Coquitlam Metro-Ford SC. When she was in grade seven, she joined the BC provincial team. She later joined the Vancouver Whitecaps Academy. In 2009, she played for Team BC at the 2009 Canada Summer Games.

== University career ==
In 2010, Sawicki began attending the University of Victoria, where she played for the women's soccer team. She was named the school's Female Rookie of the Year in her first season. At the end of her second season, she was named a Canada West First Team All-Star and a CIS Second Team All-Canadian. In her third season, she helped them win the national bronze medal and was named a CIS Tournament All-Star and a Canada West First Team All-Star. In 2013, she was again named a Canada West First Team All-Star, as well as a CIS Second Team All-Canadian. In 2014, she was once again named a Canada West First Team All-Star.

== Club career ==
In 2011 and 2012, Sawicki played with the Vancouver Whitecaps in the USL W-League. She later spent a couple years playing with the Victoria Highlanders in the non-pyramid Pacific Coast Soccer League in 2013 and 2014.

In 2016, she played with North Shore Girls SC in the Women's Premier Soccer League.

In July 2017, Sawicki signed her first professional contract for Nadeshiko League Division 1 club Chifure AS Elfen Saitama.

In March 2018, Sawicki joined Swedish Elitettan club Assi IF. She subsequently re-signed with the club for the 2019 season.

In August 2022, Sawicki signed with A-League Women side Western United, ahead of their inaugural season. She was subsequently named the team captain for the 2022–23 season. In her first season, she helped lead the team to the Australian Grand Final. After the season, she re-signed with the club for another season, where she would serve as a co-captain. On February 3, 2024, she scored her first goal for the club in a victory over the Central Coast Mariners. After two seasons with the club, she chose to depart the club to pursue another playing opportunity. Over her time with the club, she scored one goal in 35 appearances.

In November 2024, she signed with Northern Super League club Calgary Wild FC for the 2025 season. On April 16, 2025, she started in the league's inaugural game, a 1–0 loss to Vancouver Rise FC. Sawicki scored for the Wild on August 9, 2025, earning the winner in a 1–0 victory over Ottawa Rapid.

== International career ==
Sawicki was born in Canada to a Polish father and a Filipina mother, which made her eligible to represent Canada, Poland, and the Philippines at the international level.

=== Canada ===
In May 2010, she made her debut in the Canada program, attending a camp with the Canada U18 team.

In 2011, Sawicki was named to the Canada roster for the 2011 Summer Universiade. She was again named to the team for the 2013 Summer Universiade.

In September 2011, she was called up to the Canada senior team for a pair of friendlies against the United States. She made her debut on September 17. At the end of the year, she was nominated for the Canada Soccer Female U20 Player of the Year, finishing as runner-up.

In February 2012, she was called up to the Canada U20 for the 2012 CONCACAF Women's U-20 Championship. In August 2012, she was named to the team for the 2012 FIFA U-20 Women's World Cup.

=== Philippines ===
Sawicki with the Philippines national football team in 2023

In 2013, Sawicki was invited to a training camp with the Poland national team, but she found the language barrier to be difficult.

In 2017, the Philippine Football Federation approached Sawicki about joining the program, but she turned down the opportunity to focus on her club career. In 2022, they approached her a second time, which she did not initially accept, as she had returned to Canada following a serious knee injury and the COVID-19 pandemic and was not playing professionally at the time, however, she ultimately accepted the invitation.

In April 2022, Sawicki made her debut for the Philippines in a friendly against Tonga. She then helped them qualify for the 2023 FIFA Women's World Cup, the first time the country participated in the tournament. Sawicki scored her first international goal for the Philippines in their 3–0 win against Saudi Arabia on June 29, 2025, at the 2026 AFC Women's Asian Cup qualifiers.

In November 2025, Sawicki was called up to the Philippines futsal team for the 2025 FIFA Futsal Women's World Cup.

== Career statistics ==
=== Club ===
As of October 28, 2026

Appearances and goals by club, season and competition
Club	Season	League			Playoffs (Note: Includes A-League Finals Series)		National Cup (Note: Includes Empress's Cup)		Total	
Club	Season	Division	Apps	Goals	Apps	Goals	Apps	Goals	Apps	Goals
North Shore Girls	2016	WPSL	10	2	—		—		10	2
North Shore Girls	2017	WPSL	4	0	—		—		4	0
North Shore Girls	Total		14	2	0	0	0	0	14	2
Elfen Saitama	2017	Nadeshiko League Division 1	3	1	—		2	0	5	1
Assi IF	2018	Elitettan	24	3	—		—		24	3
Assi IF	2019	Elitettan	25	2	—		—		25	2
Assi IF	Total		49	5	0	0	0	0	49	5
Western United	2022–23	A-League	12	0	2	0	—		14	0
Western United	2023–24	A-League	20	1	1	0	—		21	1
Western United	Total		32	1	3	0	0	0	35	1
Calgary Wild	2025	Northern Super League	21	1	—		—		21	1
Calgary Wild	2026	Northern Super League	14	0	0	0	1	0	15	0
Calgary Wild	Total		35	1	0	0	1	0	36	1
Career total			133	10	3	0	3	0	139	10

=== International ===
Scores and results list Philippine's goal tally first, score column indicates score after each Sawicki goal.

List of international goals scored by Jaclyn Sawicki
No.	Date	Venue	Opponent	Score	Result	Competition	Ref.
1.	June 29, 2025	Olympic Stadium, Phnom Penh, Cambodia	Saudi Arabia	1–0	3–0	2026 AFC Women's Asian Cup qualification	
2.	March 19, 2026	Gold Coast Stadium, Gold Coast, Australia	Uzbekistan	2–0	2–0	2026 AFC Women's Asian Cup	

== Honours ==
Western United

- A-League Women Championship runner-up: 2022–23

Canada U20

- CONCACAF Women's U-20 Championship runner-up: 2012

Philippines

- Southeast Asian Games: 2025
- AFF Women's Championship: 2022

== See also ==
- List of association footballers who have been capped for two senior national teams
- List of Canada women's international soccer players
- List of Vancouver Whitecaps Women players
