= Hillary Beall =

American soccer player (born 1999)

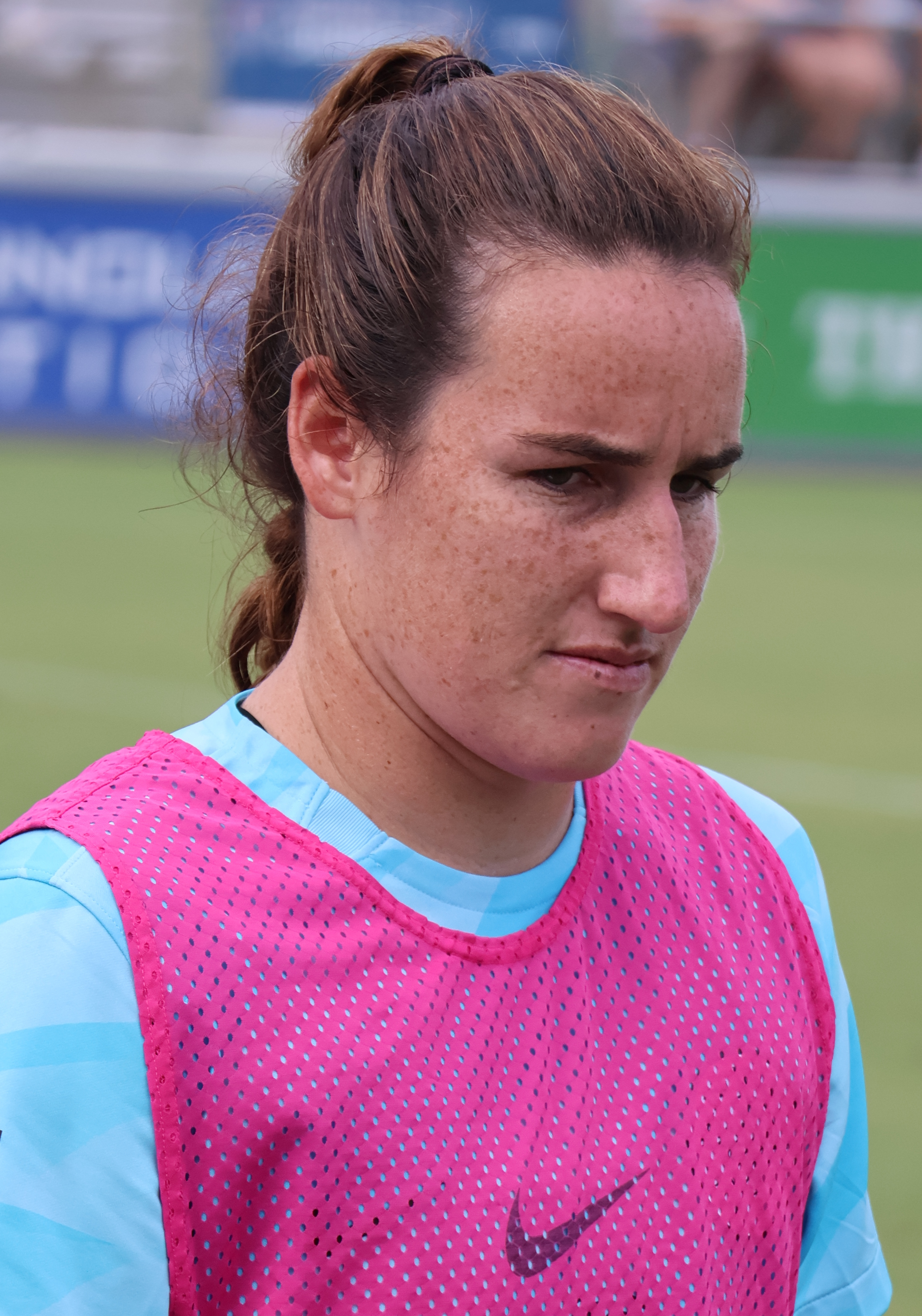
- Beall with Racing Louisville in 2023

Personal information
- Full name: Hillary Elizabeth Beall
- Date of birth: January 27, 1999 (age 27)
- Place of birth: Laguna Beach, California, U.S.
- Height: 5 ft 11 in (1.80 m)
- Position: Goalkeeper

Team information
- Current team: Houston Dash
- Number: 21

College career
Years	Team	Apps	(Gls)
2017–2021	Michigan Wolverines	76	(0)

Senior career*
Years	Team	Apps	(Gls)
2022–2023	Racing Louisville FC	0	(0)
2022–2024	→ Western United (loan)	31	(0)
2024–2025	San Diego Wave	2	(0)
2026–	Houston Dash	0	(0)

International career
2016	United States U17		
2018	United States U20		
- * Club domestic league appearances and goals as of 02:31, December 9, 2025 (UTC)

Hillary Elizabeth Beall (born January 27, 1999) is an American professional soccer player who plays as a goalkeeper for the Houston Dash of the National Women's Soccer League (NWSL). She played college soccer for the Michigan Wolverines.

Beall began her professional career at Racing Louisville FC and spent two seasons on loan from the club playing for Western United FC (A-League Women). She was named Player of the Year in her first professional season with Western United, which was also the club's inaugural season.

== Early life ==
A native of Laguna Beach, California, Beall started playing soccer at the age of eleven first as a striker before switching to goalkeeper. She played at the youth club level for the SoCal Blues.

Beall was ranked nationally as the number one goalkeeper in the class of 2017 and number 9 player overall. She received numerous honors, including being named as a NSCAA Youth All American and named to the Top Drawer Soccer ECNL Top XI for the ECNL Playoffs.

== College career ==
Beall attended the University of Michigan in the United States, where she was regarded as one of the soccer team's most important players. After being named the No. 1 goalkeeper in the class of 2017 by Top Drawer Soccer, Beall joined the University of Michigan Wolverines. There she numbered 285 saves and achieved a .797 save percentage. As a freshman for Michigan's 2017 season, Beall appeared in seven matches with six starts and achieved a .838 save percentage. She had a .756 save percentage, making 34 saves her sophomore year (2018), which was shortened due to injury and where she started the final 10 games and earned four wins in net, including three shutouts. Beall's junior year was one of distinction where she started all 24 games, achieved a save average of .762 and dropped her goals against average from 1.06 her sophomore year to .52. She earned 17 wins in net, including six shutouts. Her 17 wins rank second all-time in Michigan single season history.

In her senior year season, played in the spring of 2021 due to COVID-19, Beall started all 11 games and gave up just six goals. She made 52 saves - a .800 save average.

Beall played in the United Women's Soccer (UWS) Pro-Am league for SC Blue Heat in the summer of 2021. The club won the national championship and Beall was named Goalkeeper of the Year.

In her 5th year in the fall of 2021, Beall started 24 of 25 matches with a goal-against average of .74, 87 saves and nine clean sheets. Her regular season 75 saves ranked third in the Big Ten conference. The Wolverines won their first Big Ten tournament in 20 years, and the Michigan Daily identified her as the “lynchpin’ and ‘x-factor’ of the team. In the Big Ten final Beall stopped all three shots on net sending the Wolverines to their first NCAA tournament since 2019 and third in the program's history. The Wolverines eventually lost to the eventual National Champion Florida State in overtime.

== Club career ==
=== Racing Louisville FC ===
Beall was signed as a rookie to Racing Louisville FC, and towards the end of the 2022 season, she was sent on loan to play for Australian side Western United through early 2024. She returned to Racing Louisville after the loan and was traded to the San Diego Wave before the start of the 2024 season.

==== Western United FC (loan) ====
Beall spent two professional seasons on loan from Louisville Racing to Western United, an A-League Women's expansion club based in the suburbs of Melbourne, Australia. She was described as a "revelation for Western United... keeping seven clean sheets to help United to second place on the table and an appearance in the grand final." The 2022–23 season was one of firsts – Beall's first professional season and Western United's inaugural season in the A-League. Due to its successful challenges of more established clubs, Australian Broadcasting Corporation (ABC) deemed Western United's first year in top-flight play a ‘fairytale’ one, which included an upset 1–0 victory over Sydney FC to reach the grand final.

One of the squad's vice captains, Beall was named Western's Player of the Season and crowned Liberty A-League Goalkeeper of the Year, named in the Professional Footballers Australia's (PFA) team of the season and voted Player of the Month twice. She also garnered the ‘Save of the Year’ trophy at the Dolan Warren awards night.

Beall returned for her second season with Western United. According to its general manager Mal Impiombato, her return was an indicator of the club's commitment to be a contender in the A-League. “Hillary was the best goalkeeper in the competition last season and we are delighted to have her return and be a key part of our roster again,” he said. “Her accolades and awards spoke to the quality she brought on the pitch and it was important for us to bring that back into our squad as we continue to aim high in the Liberty A-League.”

=== San Diego Wave ===
Beall joined the San Diego Wave as a goalkeeper in the 2024 pre-season. She made her debut for San Diego on July 20, 2024, in the NWSL x Liga MX Femenil Summer Cup. During the club's 3–1 victory over Bay FC, Beall saved a penalty kick attempt from Deyna Castellanos near the end of the game. Beall was unable to participate in the Wave's next Summer Cup match due to a foot injury. After her first season in San Diego, Beall re-signed with the Wave for the 2025 season.

In her second year with the Wave, Beall did not make a competitive appearance. Although starting goalkeeper Kailen Sheridan missed two midseason matches due to parental leave, it was offseason acquisition DiDi Haračić who was the preferred backup in both games. Beall departed from San Diego as a free agent at the end of the season.

=== Houston Dash ===
On December 8, 2025, the Houston Dash signed Beall to a two-year contract.

== International career ==
Beall was selected to compete for the US Youth National Team (YNT) at the U14, U15, and U17, U19 and U20 levels. She was also named to the U17 and U20 NT rosters to compete in the Women's World Cup. She was part of the under-17 roster which won the CONCACAF Championship after defeating Costa Rica. She also made the national team roster for the U17 Women's World Cup in Amman, Jordan, and the U20 Women's World Cup in France.

== Career statistics ==
=== Club ===
As of December 8, 2025

Appearances and goals by club, season and competition
Club	Season	League			Cup (Note: Includes the NWSL Challenge Cup)		Playoffs (Note: Includes NWSL Playoffs and A-League Finals Series)		Continental (Note: Includes CONCACAF W Champions Cup)		Other		Total	
Club	Season	Division	Apps	Goals	Apps	Goals	Apps	Goals	Apps	Goals	Apps	Goals	Apps	Goals
Racing Louisville FC	2022	NWSL	0	0	0	0	—		—		—		0	0
Racing Louisville FC	2023	NWSL	0	0	0	0	—		—		—		0	0
Racing Louisville FC	Total		0	0	0	0	—		—		—		0	0
Western United FC (loan)	2022–23	A-League	18	0	—		2	0	—		—		20	0
Western United FC (loan)	2023–24	A-League	13	0	—		—		—		—		13	0
Western United FC (loan)	Total		31	0	—		2	0	—		—		33	0
San Diego Wave FC	2024	NWSL	2	0	0	0	—		2	0	1 (Note: Includes NWSL x Liga MX Femenil Summer Cup)	0	5	0
San Diego Wave FC	2025	NWSL	0	0	—		0	0	—		—		0	0
Career total			33	0	0	0	2	0	2	0	1	0	38	0

== Honors ==
San Diego Wave

- NWSL Challenge Cup: 2024

Individual

- Third-team All-Big Ten: 2019, 2020
- Big Ten tournament all-tournament team: 2021
