= Grace Maher =

Australian football player

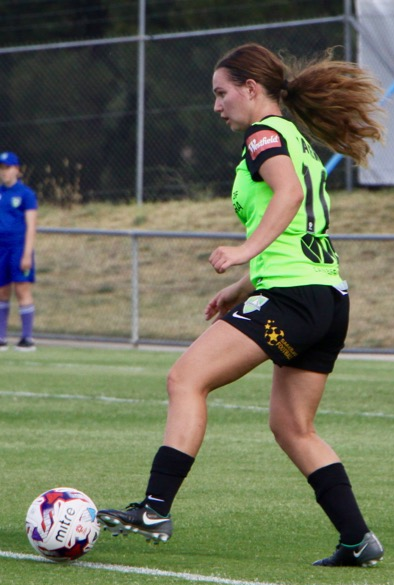

Personal information
- Full name: Grace Maher
- Date of birth: 18 April 1999 (age 27)
- Place of birth: Dubbo, New South Wales, Australia
- Position: Midfielder

Team information
- Current team: Melbourne Victory
- Number: 81

Senior career*
Years	Team	Apps	(Gls)
2015–2018	Canberra United	28	(5)
2018–2019	Melbourne Victory	8	(1)
2019	KR	17	(2)
2019–2020	Melbourne Victory	9	(0)
2020–2023	Canberra United	42	(8)
2023–2025	Western United	23	(1)
2025–	Melbourne Victory	0	(0)

International career^{‡}
2016–	Australia U20	13	(3)
- * Club domestic league appearances and goals as of 27 May 2024 ‡ National team caps and goals as of 29 October 2017

Grace Maher (/ˈmɑːɹ/; born 18 April 1999) is an Australian soccer player who currently plays for Melbourne Victory in the Australian A-League Women. She previously played for Canberra United and Western United in the A-League Women and for KR in the Úrvalsdeild kvenna.

== Early life ==
Maher was born on 18 April 1999 in Dubbo, New South Wales. As a junior she played for Majura FC, which competed in Capital Football's National Premier League. At 13-years-old she was a ball girl at a W-League match featuring Canberra United and broke her wrist stopping a ball.

== Club career ==
In October 2014, at the age of 15 years 184 days, Maher became the youngest Canberra United player ever in the W-League (later renamed A-League Women). She was in the starting line-up for the 2014 Grand Final, helping Canberra defeat Perth 3–1. In four seasons at Canberra, Maher made 28 appearances and scored 5 goals.

Maher signed with Melbourne Victory for the 2018–19 W-League season. In September 2020, after two seasons with Melbourne Victory, Maher returned to Canberra United.

In August 2023, Maher returned to Melbourne, joining Western United. Maher rejoined Melbourne Victory in September 2025, and by that time she had played 135 matches for A-League Women teams (Canberra United, Melbourne Victory, Western United).

== International ==
Maher has played for the Young Matildas, and was called up to the Australia women's national team for a training camp in Australia ahead of the 2017 Algarve Cup.

== Honors ==
Canberra United

- W-League Championship: 2014
- W-League Premiership: 2016–17
