= Stacey Papadopoulos =

Australian soccer player (born 1996)

Personal information
- Full name: Stacey Shopa Papadopoulos
- Date of birth: 17 December 1996 (age 29)
- Place of birth: Australia
- Position: Right back

Youth career
- 2008–2011: Heidelberg United

College career
Years	Team	Apps	(Gls)
2020–2021	AWC Matadors	8	(3)

Senior career*
Years	Team	Apps	(Gls)
2012	Heidelberg United	19	(14)
2013	Box Hill United	23	(10)
2014–2015	Bundoora United	18	(2)
2016–2017	Calder United		
2018	Old Xaverians		
2019	Calder United		
2020	Kelen	1	(0)
2022	Calder United	23	(5)
2022–2024	Western United	35	(1)
2024–2026	Hibernian	54	(3)

International career^{‡}
2025–	Greece	6	(0)
- * Club domestic league appearances and goals as of 25 May 2026 ‡ National team caps and goals as of 25 May 2026

Stacey Shopa Papadopoulos (Greek: Στέισι Σόπα Παπαδοπούλου; born 17 December 1996) is a professional soccer player who plays as a defender. Born in Australia, she represents Greece internationally.

== Early life ==
Papadopoulos was born on 17 December 1996 in Australia. Of Greek descent through her parents, she has two older brothers and attended Northcote High School in Australia.

== Career ==
As a youth player, Papadopolous joined the youth academy of Australian side Heidelberg United and was promoted to the club's senior team. Subsequently, she signed for Australian side Calder United, helping the club win the league title and the 2022 Football Victoria Women's State Knockout Cup.

In 2023, she signed for Australian side Western United, where she made thirty-five league appearances and scored zero goals and helped the club achieve second place in the league. Ahead of the 2024–25 season, she signed for Scottish side Hibs. On 11 August 2024, she debuted for the club during a 2–1 away win over Partick Thistle in the league.

== International career ==
Papadopoulos is eligible to represent either Australia (the country she was born, raised and developed in) or Greece (through her Greek heritage) internationally. Despite dreaming of playing for the Matildas, she was never called up for Australia on any level.

In November 2025, Papadopoulos received her first call-up for Greece, being selected by newly-appointed manager Vasilios Spertos for two friendly matches against Belarus on 29 November and Bosnia and Herzegovina on 2 December, both matches being hosted in Sarajevo.

== Style of play ==
Papadopoulos plays as a defender. While playing for Calder United, she played as a winger before switching to defender while playing for Western United.

== Career statistics ==
=== College ===
Team	Season	NJCAA Regular Season			ACCAC Tournament		NJCAA Tournament		Total	
Team	Season	Division	Apps	Goals	Apps	Goals	Apps	Goals	Apps	Goals
AWC Matadors	2020	Div. 1	7	3	1	0	—		8	3

=== Club ===
As of 15 June 2026

Club	Season	Division	League		Cup (Note: Includes FV State Knockout Cup, Hungarian Cup, Scottish Cup)		Continental (Note: Includes UEFA Women's Champions League and UEFA Women's Europa Cup)		Other (Note: Includes FV Community Shield and SWPL Cup)		Total	
Club	Season	Division	Apps	Goals	Apps	Goals	Apps	Goals	Apps	Goals	Apps	Goals
Heidelberg United	2012	Victorian Premier League	19	14	?	?	—		—		19+	14+
Box Hill United	2013	Victorian Premier League	23	10	?	?	—		—		23+	10+
Bundoora United	2014	Victorian Premier League	10	1	?	?	—		—		10+	1+
Bundoora United	2015	Victorian Premier League	8	1	?	?	—		—		8+	1+
Bundoora United	Total		18	2	?	?	—		—		18+	2+
Calder United	2016	NPL Victoria	26	3	2	0	—		—		28	3
Calder United	2017	NPL Victoria	?	1	3	0	—		1	0	4+	1
Calder United	Total		26+	4	5	0	–		1	0	32+	4
Old Xaverians	2018	Victorian State League 1 North-West	?	3	0	0	—		—		?	3
Calder United	2019	NPL Victoria	?	5	?	2	—		1	0	1+	7
Kelen	2019–20	Nemzeti Bajnokság I	1	0	1	0	—		—		2	0
Calder United	2022	NPL Victoria	23	5	?	0	—		—		23+	5
Western United	2022–23	A-League	12	0	—		—		—		12	0
Western United	2023–24	A-League	23	1	—		—		—		23	1
Western United	Total		35	1	—		—		—		35	1
Hibernian	2024–25	SWPL	28	2	1	0	—		4	0	33	2
Hibernian	2025–26	SWPL	26	1	0	0	4	0	3	0	33	1
Hibernian	Totsl		54	3	1	0	4	0	7	0	66	3
Total career			199+	47	7+	2+	4	0	9	0	219+	49+

== Honours ==
Calder United

- NPL Victoria (3): 2016, 2019, 2022
- FV State Knockout Cup (3): 2017, 2019, 2022
- FV Community Shield (2): 2017, 2019

Hibernian

- Scottish Women's Premier League (1): 2024–25
