= Melissa Taranto =

Australian soccer player

Personal information
- Full name: Melissa Taranto
- Date of birth: 22 March 1999 (age 27)
- Place of birth: Australia
- Position: Midfielder

Team information
- Current team: Adelaide United
- Number: 6

Senior career*
Years	Team	Apps	(Gls)
2015–2016	Melbourne Victory	11	(0)
2022–	Calder United	21	(4)
2022–2025	Western United	41	(2)
2025–	Adelaide United	13	(0)
- * Club domestic league appearances and goals as of 2 February 2026

Melissa Taranto (Italian: [meˈlissa ˈtaːranto]; born 1999) is an Australian soccer player, who plays for Adelaide United in the Australian A-League Women. She has also played for Galaxy United FC in the Victorian Women's Premier League. Taranto has represented Australia on the Australia women's national under-17 soccer team. She is the twin sister of Adriana Taranto.

== Playing career ==
- Club

Season	Team	Comp								
2023/2024	Western United	A-W	1658	20	20	0	5	0	1	2
2022/2023	Western United	A-W	1469	19	17	2	7	2	1	3
2022	Calder United	VNW	1618	21	20	1	8	1	4	2
2016/2017	Melbourne Victory	A-W	11	1	1	0	1	0	0	0
2015/2016	Melbourne Victory	A-W	581	10	6	4	5	5	0	1
Total			5337	71	64	7	26	8	6	8

=== International ===
Taranto has represented Australia on the Australia women's national under-17 soccer team.
