= Hannah Keane =

American soccer player (born 1993)

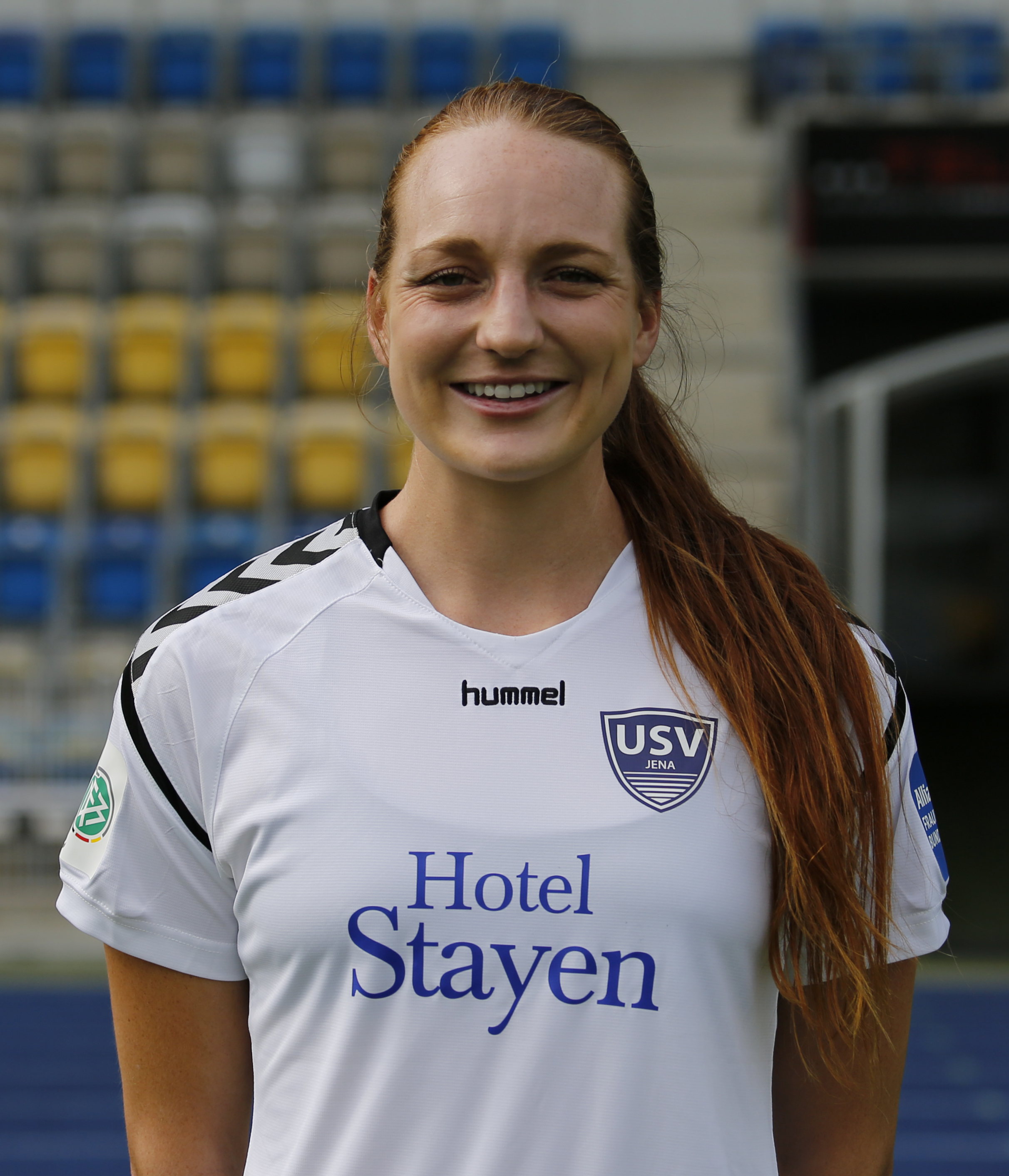
- Keane with USV Jena in 2017

Personal information
- Full name: Hannah Elizabeth Keane
- Date of birth: May 7, 1993 (age 33)
- Place of birth: Sacramento, California, United States
- Height: 5 ft 11 in (1.80 m)
- Position: Forward

Youth career
- California Rush
- 2007–2008: St. Francis Troubadours
- 2009–2010: McClatchy Lions

College career
Years	Team	Apps	(Gls)
2011–2014	San Diego State Aztecs	85	(29)

Senior career*
Years	Team	Apps	(Gls)
2014	San Diego SeaLions	5	(9)
2015	Newcastle United	5	(3)
2016	Alamein FC (NPL Victoria)	18	(15)
2017	Boston Breakers (reserve)	8	(6)
2017–2018	USV Jena	5	(0)
2017–2018	USV Jena II	15	(10)
2018–2021	Braga	67	(39)
2021–2022	Sporting de Huelva	29	(5)
2022–2024	Western United	40	(24)
2024–2026	Tampa Bay Sun	13	(2)
- * Club domestic league appearances and goals as of 03:44, May 18, 2026 (UTC)

Hannah Elizabeth Keane (born May 7, 1993) is an American professional soccer player who plays as a forward.

== Early life and college career ==
Keane began her career as a competitive player for Sacramento United FC, and later with Union Sacramento FC where she was selected to attend Adidas Elite Soccer Player Recruiting event in 2009.

In 2011 she joined the NCAA Division 1 San Diego State Aztecs, where she had five goals in 19 games in her inaugural season. Over her career with the Aztecs, Keane scored a total of 29 goals, ranking her fifth all time in the club's history.

== Club career ==
In her first senior role during the 2014 summer break, she played for the San Diego SeaLions in the Women's Premier Soccer League where she scored nine times in five games.

In the spring of 2015 Keane spent a semester in England where she tried out and secured a position with Newcastle United. She appeared in 5 matches and helped Newcastle obtain several league points.

After graduation from SDSU, Keane signed with NPL Victoria team Alamein in 2016. Although injured for half the season she still managed to score 15 goals in 18 appearances and garner Media Player of the year for the league.

She returned to the United States in early June 2017 and joined the reserve team for the Boston Breakers in the Women's Premier Soccer League.

On July 17, 2017, she signed for Frauen-Bundesliga club FF USV Jena, where she made her debut in September 2017. In addition to five games in the Bundesliga, Keane played 15 games in Jena’s second team in the Bundesliga North and was their top scorer.

After departing Jena, on August 21, 2018, Keane signed in Portugal with SC Braga. She played with Braga for three seasons and helped them to achieve several team trophies.

Keane signed with Sporting de Huelva in the Spanish Primera Iberdrola League, playing for a single season. She was an important contributor towards getting the team to the finals of the Copa de la Reina.

On August 9, 2022, Keane signed with the Australian A-League Women club Western United for their inaugural season, and was the team's first international signing. She was included in the A-League Women Team of the Season, after winning the A-League Women Golden Boot award.

In June 2024, Keane joined Tampa Bay Sun ahead of the inaugural USL Super League season. She made 13 appearances across two years for the Sun and contributed to Tampa Bay's inaugural Super League championship title in her first season. On June 15, 2026, Keane was announced to be departing from the Sun.

== Personal life ==
Keane attended St Francis High School for two years and then transferred to CK McClatchy for her junior and senior years. She earned a bachelor of science degree in Health Communications from San Diego State University.

== Honors ==
Braga

- Campeonato Nacional: 2018–19
- Taça de Portugal Feminina: 2019–20
- Supertaça de Portugal: 2018

Sporting de Huelva

- Copa de la Reina runner-up: 2021–22

Tampa Bay Sun

- USL Super League: 2024–25
