= Kahli Johnson =

Australian soccer player (born 2004)

Personal information
- Full name: Kahli Mary Johnson
- Date of birth: February 18, 2004 (age 22)
- Place of birth: Sydney, New South Wales, Australia
- Height: 1.68 m (5 ft 6 in)
- Position: Forward

Team information
- Current team: Calgary Wild FC
- Number: 15

Youth career
- Dee Why FC
- CC Strikers
- Manly United

Senior career*
| Years | Team | Apps | (Gls) |
| 2022 | Sydney FC | 5 | (0) |
| 2022 | → Manly United FC (loan) | 5 | (2) |
| 2022–2025 | Western United FC | 48 | (13) |
| 2023 | → Manly United FC (loan) | 8 | (3) |
| 2025– | Calgary Wild FC | 33 | (8) |

International career^{‡}
| 2022–2024 | Australia U20 | 10 | (0) |
| 2025– | Australia | 3 | (1) |
- * Club domestic league appearances and goals as of October 28, 2026 ‡ National team caps and goals as of 6 March 2026

Kahli Mary Johnson (born 18 February 2004) is an Australian soccer player who plays for Calgary Wild FC in the Northern Super League and the Australia national team.

== Early life ==
Johnson began playing youth soccer with Dee Why FC and CC Strikers. She later played youth soccer with Manly United.

== Club career ==
In 2022, Johnson began playing with Sydney FC in the A-League Women, also appearing for Manly United FC in the National Premier Leagues NSW Women's.

In August 2022, she signed with Western United FC of the A-League Women. On February 26, 2023, she scored her first goals, netting two goals in a 6–0 victory over the Newcastle Jets. In June 2023, she signed an extension with the club. In May 2024, she again extended her contract for another season. In February 2025, she departed the club, securing an overseas transfer, with Western United receiving their first ever transfer fee for a player sale. At the time of her departure, she was the leading scorer in the league.

In February 2025, she signed with Canadian Northern Super League club Calgary Wild FC. On 16 April 2025, she started in the league's inaugural game, a 1-0 loss to Vancouver Rise FC. On April 26, 2025, she scored a brace in a 4–1 victory over the Halifax Tides, to help the side record their first victory in franchise history.

== International career ==
In 2022, she was named to the Australia U20 squad for the 2022 FIFA U-20 Women's World Cup. In 2024, she was named to the squad for the 2024 AFC U-20 Women's Asian Cup and the 2024 FIFA U-20 Women's World Cup.

In May 2023, she was named to a camp with the Australia U23 team for the first time.

In May 2025, she received her first call-up for the Australia senior national team for two friendlies against Argentina, where she scored her first international goal on 30 May 2025, in her debut appearance.

== International goals ==
| No. | Date | Venue | Opponent | Score | Result | Competition |
|---|---|---|---|---|---|---|
| 1. | 30 May 2025 | Marvel Stadium, Melbourne, Australia | Argentina | 1–0 | 2–0 | Friendly |
