= Western United FC (women) =

Women's football club from Tarneit, Australia

Western United Women
- Full name: Western United Football Club (A-League Women)
- Founded: 2022
- Dissolved: 2026
- Owner(s): Western Melbourne Group, Sayers Road Investment Co, Jaszac Investments – Jason Sourasis, Theodore Andriopoulos, Steve Horvat, Levent Shevki and John Tripodi
- Website: https://wufc.com.au/

Western United Football Club (A-League Women) was an Australian professional women's soccer club based in the western Melbourne suburb of Truganina. The club was formed through a successful bid to enter the A-League Women, commencing in the 2022–23 season.

The club lost their licence to compete in the 2025–26 season, with the possibility of returning at a later date. On 10 August 2026, the Australian Professional Leagues had announced that it had terminated the club's A-Leagues Men and Womens' licenses. Two days later, Football Victoria withdrew the club from all state based competitions following the Federal Court's decision to order the club's owners to be wound up in insolvency.

== History ==
On 12 May 2022, it was announced that Western United had joined the A-League Women from the 2022–23 season. Mark Torcaso was appointed as the inaugural head coach on 29 June 2022. A month later, Helen Winterburn was appointed as the assistant coach. In August, Hannah Keane became the team's first international signing. In October 2022, the club confirmed the football department staff. In November 2022, the club held its first friendly, defeating defending champions Melbourne Victory with Keane scoring the only goal of the match.

=== Financial difficulties & Terminations ===
In August 2025, the club's license to compete in the A-League Men and A-League Women competitions was stripped by Football Australia's independent first instance board, which oversees club licensing. On 29 August, the club's owners WMG Holdings were placed in liquidation, after a Federal Court order. On 6 September 2025, the club's A-Leagues participation was paused for the 2025–26 season, with the possibility of returning at a later date. On 19 May 2026, Football Australia announced that Western United did not satisfy the mandatory licensing criteria for the upcoming 2026–27 season. On 10 August 2026, the Australian Professional Leagues had announced that it had terminated the club's A-Leagues Men & Womens' licenses.

== Season by season history ==
=== Key ===
2nd or RU	Runners-up
3rd	Third
EF	Elimination Finalist

=== Results ===
As of 28 August 2025

Season	Division	Pld	W	D	L	GF	GA	Pts	Pos	Finals	Name(s)	Goals
Season	League									Finals	Top goalscorer(s)	
2022–23	A-League Women	18	13	0	5	38	20	39	2nd	RU	Hannah Keane	14
2023–24	A-League Women	22	11	3	8	37	34	36	3rd	EF	Hannah Keane	10
2024–25	A-League Women	23	9	6	8	39	46	33	6th	EF	Kahli Johnson	8

== Players ==
Following the hibernation of the club's participation in the A-League Women ahead of the 2025–26 season, all senior players were released from their contracts. Therefore, the player list below represents the squad at the time of withdrawal of the club's licence.

As of 29 August 2025

Note: Flags indicate national team as defined under FIFA eligibility rules; some limited exceptions apply. Players may hold more than one non-FIFA nationality.

No.	Pos.	Nation	Player
1	GK	AUS	Alyssa Dall'Oste
2	MF	AUS	Emily Roach
4	DF	AUS	Claudia Mihocic
5	DF	AUS	Aimee Medwin
7	FW	AUS	Kiara De Domizio
8	MF	AUS	Sasha Grove
13	MF	AUS	Avaani Prakash
15	MF	AUS	Adriana Taranto

No.	Pos.	Nation	Player
16	MF	AUS	Melissa Taranto
18	DF	AUS	Grace Maher (vice-captain)
19	FW	AUS	Alana Cortellino
22	DF	AUS	Alana Cerne
24	DF	AUS	Julia Sardo
26	GK	AUS	Natalie Picak (scholarship)
28	DF	COL	Isabel Dehakiz

== Managers ==
Position	Name
Head coach	(Australia) Kat Smith
Assistant coach	

== Honours ==
- A-League Women Premiership

Runners-up (1): 2022–23

- A-League Women Championship

Runners-up (1): 2023

== See also ==
- Women's soccer in Australia
- List of women's association football clubs
- Western United FC
