= 2026 Calgary Wild FC season =

Canadian soccer club's season of play

Calgary Wild FC
2026 season
- Chair: Deanna Zumwalt
- Head Coach: Lydia Bedford (until 9 March); Sinead McSharry (interim from 9 March); Leah Blayney (from 6 July)
- Stadium: McMahon Stadium; Calgary, Alberta

The 2026 Calgary Wild FC season was the second in the club's history, as well as the second season in Northern Super League history.

== Summary ==
In the 2025 season, Calgary Wild finished 5th in the league.

On 13 February 2026, Calgary Wild added players Allie Hess and Molly Race, whilst adding Dave Odorico as a Goalkeeping Coach / Assistant Coach.

On 9 March 2026, Lydia Bedford left the club to become manager of the England women's national under-23 football team. Sinead McSharry was named as interim coach the same day. Caitlin Pavone was also appointed Director of Football Operations.

On 6 July 2026, Leah Blayney was confirmed as manager of the club.

== Team ==
=== Coaching staff ===
As of March 9, 2026.

Position	Name
Head coach	(Australia) Leah Blayney

=== Roster ===
As of 10 September, 2026.

No.	Nat.	Name	Date of birth (age)	Since	Previous club	Notes
Goalkeepers
1	(United States)	Katelin Talbert	October 9, 1998 (aged 27)	2026	Free agent	INT
26	(Canada)	Sarah Keilty-Dilling	July 15, 1993 (aged 32)	2025		
Defenders
2	(Canada)	Grace Stordy	January 21, 2002 (aged 24)	2025	(Canada) Calgary Foothills	
5	(New Zealand)	Meikayla Moore	June 4, 1996 (aged 29)	2025	(Scotland) Glasgow City	INT
11	(Canada)	Tilly James	June 13, 1998 (aged 27)	2025	(Canada) Trinity Western Spartans	
12	(Canada)	Frédérique St-Jean	June 6, 2000 (aged 25)	2026	(Canada) FC Laval	
41	(United States)	Madison Pogarch	November 5, 1997 (aged 28)	2026	(Sweden) Hammarby	INT
44	(Canada)	Talia White	October 16, 1998 (aged 27)	2025	(Republic of Ireland) Treaty United	
Midfielders
3	(United States)	Allie Hess	July 19, 1996 (aged 29)	2026	(Canada) Montreal Roses FC	INT
6	(Philippines)	Jaclyn Sawicki	November 14, 1992 (aged 33)	2025	(Australia) Western United	
7	(Canada)	Caleigh Boeckx	July 26, 2000 (aged 25)	2025	(Republic of Ireland) Treaty United	
8	(Venezuela)	Sonia O'Neill	August 19, 1994 (aged 31)	2025	(England) London City Lionesses	
10	(Afghanistan)	Farkhunda Muhtaj	November 15, 1997 (aged 28)	2025	(Netherlands) Fortuna Sittard	
16	(Canada)	Jenaya Robertson	April 8, 1997 (aged 28)	2025	(Canada) Unity FC	
19	(Wales)	Keelyn Stewart	October 10, 2007 (aged 18)	2025	(Canada) ASA High Performance	
22	(United States)	Hannah Boughton	December 15, 2003 (aged 22)	2026	(United States) Minnesota Aurora FC	INT
23	(United States)	Taylor Otto	October 23, 1999 (aged 26)	2026	(Australia) Melbourne City	INT
28	(United States)	Meggie Dougherty Howard	July 27, 1995 (aged 30)	2025	(United States) Angel City	INT
29	(Canada)	Andersen Williams	April 2, 2002 (aged 23)	2025	(United States) Texas A&M Aggies	
Forwards
4	(United States)	Jorian Baucom	August 4, 1996 (aged 29)	2025	(United States) Fort Lauderdale	INT
15	(Australia)	Kahli Johnson	February 18, 2004 (aged 22)	2025	(Australia) Western United	INT
18	(Canada)	Serita Thurton	January 16, 2002 (aged 24)	2025	(United States) South Florida Bulls	
30	(Canada)	Taegan Stewart	October 10, 2007 (aged 18)	2025	(Canada) ASA High Performance	
99	(Canada)	Mya Jones	August 1, 2001 (aged 24)	2026	Free agent	
Left during the season
9	(Canada)	Kathryn Harvey	June 9, 1997 (aged 28)	2025	(Australia) Melbourne City	
17	(Venezuela)	Michelle Romero	June 12, 1997 (aged 28)	2025	(Spain) Real Unión de Tenerife	INT
23	(Canada)	Molly Race	October 26, 2001 (aged 24)	2026	Transfer	

== Competitions ==
=== Northern Super League ===
==== Table ====
Pos	Team	Pld	W	D	L	GF	GA	GD	Pts	Playoff qualification
1	Montreal Roses (S, Q)	25	12	9	4	43	27	+16	45	Advance to playoffs
2	Ottawa Rapid (Q)	25	12	4	9	49	44	+5	40	Advance to playoffs
3	AFC Toronto (Q)	24	10	8	6	37	23	+14	38	Advance to playoffs
4	Vancouver Rise	25	9	4	12	47	55	−8	31	Advance to playoffs
5	Halifax Tides	24	7	7	10	23	23	0	28	
6	Calgary Wild (E)	25	5	6	14	28	55	−27	21	

Updated to match(es) played on October 23, 2026. Source: NSL
Rules for classification: 1) Points 2) Head-to-head points; 3) Head-to-head goal difference; 4) Goal difference; 5) Wins; 6) Goals scored; 7) Goals conceded; 8) Least red cards; 9) Least yellow cards; 10) Drawing of lots.
(E) Eliminated; (Q) Qualified for the phase indicated; (S) Supporters' Shield winner

==== Matches ====
===== April and May =====
April 25, 2026 1	Calgary Wild	0–2	Montreal Roses	Calgary, Alberta
	Boeckx (yellow card) 85'		Bennett 37', 49'; Hill (yellow card) 79'	Stadium: McMahon Stadium; Referee: Anne-Marie Canuel

May 2, 2026 2	Ottawa Rapid FC	5–2	Calgary Wild	Ottawa, Ontario
	Forbes 1'; Melenhorst 25', 33' (yellow card) 53'; Belzile 29'; Choo 63'		Dougherty Howard 11'; Stewart 12'	Stadium: TD Place Stadium; Referee: Isabelle Duclos

May 16, 2026 3	Calgary Wild	2–2	Montreal Roses	Calgary, Alberta
	Jones 85', 90+1'	Report	Pechersky 24' (yellow card) 83'; Monyard 90'	Stadium: McMahon Stadium; Referee: Fabrizio Stasolla

May 24, 2026 4	Calgary Wild	0–4	Halifax Tides FC	Calgary, Alberta
	Talbert (yellow card) 54'	Report	Miller 7', 25'; Vallerand 22', 78'	Stadium: McMahon Stadium; Attendance: 2,847; Referee: Angelina Baldino

May 31, 2026 5	Calgary Wild	0–4	AFC Toronto	Calgary, Alberta
	Johnson (yellow card) 52'	Report	Rowe 12'; Hunter 48'; Stratigakis (yellow card) 68' (goal) 74'; Chisholm (yellow card) 77'; Novak 90+1'	Stadium: McMahon Stadium; Referee: Roberto D'Alesio

===== June =====
June 13, 2026 6	Halifax Tides FC	2–0	Calgary Wild	Halifax, Nova Scotia
	Benati 29'; Moe (yellow card) 37' (red card) 48'; Miller 44'	Report	O'Neill (yellow card) 36'; Robertson (yellow card) 61'; Stordy (yellow card) 90+1'	Stadium: Wanderers Grounds; Attendance: 3,735; Referee: Carly Shaw-Maclaren

June 21, 2026 7	Montreal Roses FC	1–1	Calgary Wild	Laval, Quebec
	Badu 29'	Report	Johnson 10'	Stadium: Stade Boréale; Referee: Sheila Couture

June 27, 2026 8	Calgary Wild	0–1	Halifax Tides FC	Calgary, Alberta
		Report	Miller 81'; Weichers (yellow card) 90+4'	Stadium: McMahon Stadium; Attendance: 3,164; Referee: Alain Ruch

===== July =====
July 5, 2026 9	Ottawa Rapid FC	3–1	Calgary Wild	Ottawa, Ontario
	Melenhorst 17'; Fridlund 42'; Harris (yellow card) 60'; Wilkinson 90+2'	Report	Dougherty Howard 65'; Stordy (yellow card) 67'	Stadium: TD Place Stadium; Referee: Roberto D'Alesio

July 11, 2026 10	Calgary Wild	2–4	Vancouver Rise	Calgary, Alberta
16:00 PT	Dougherty Howard 18'; Baucom 25'; O'Neill (yellow card) 36'	Report	Pante 7'; Lee 37'; Longhurst 86'; López 90+3'	Stadium: McMahon Stadium; Referee: Sheila Couture

July 17, 2026 11	Calgary Wild	0–2	Montreal Roses	Calgary, Alberta
		Report	Cappadona 29'; Whitaker 33'	Stadium: McMahon Stadium; Referee: Carly Shaw-MacLaren

July 22, 2026 12	Calgary Wild	1–2	Ottawa Rapid FC	Calgary, Alberta
	Johnson 50'	Report	Melenhorst 36'; Fridlund 72'; Choo (yellow card) 90+2'	Stadium: McMahon Stadium; Attendance: 2,210; Referee: Anne-Marie Canuel

July 28, 2026 13	AFC Toronto	1–0	Calgary Wild	Toronto, Ontario
	Hunter 50'; Chisholm (yellow card) 77'	Report		Stadium: York Lions Stadium; Attendance: 2,682; Referee: Mario Alayass

===== August =====
August 1, 2026 14	Calgary Wild FC	0–6	AFC Toronto	Calgary, Alberta
	Stordy (red card) 33'	Report	Hunter 21', 33', (yellow card) 54'; Rowe 36'; Barnett 41'; Rollins 58'; Novak 90+1'	Stadium: McMahon Stadium; Attendance: 2,232; Referee: Isabelle Duclos

August 8, 2026 15	Vancouver Rise	2–3	Calgary Wild	Burnaby, British Columbia
16:00 PT	De Filippo 56', 65'; Tumeth (red card) 83'	Report	T. Stewart 47'; Baucom (yellow card) 73', (goal) 90'; Moore (yellow card) 75'; K. Stewart 90+6'	Stadium: Swangard Stadium; Attendance: 3,498; Referee: Anne-Marie Canuel

August 15, 2026 16	Calgary Wild FC	4–3	Ottawa Rapid	Calgary, Alberta
	Johnson 14'; Thurton 27', 45+3'; Baucom 76'	Report	Jung 37' (yellow card) 90+4'; Forbes 45'; Baie Pridham (yellow card) 55' (red card) 58'; Harris 85'	Stadium: McMahon Stadium; Attendance: 3,231; Referee: Isabelle Duclos

August 23, 2026 17	Montreal Roses	2–2	Calgary Wild FC	Laval, Quebec
15:00 EDT (UTC-04:00)	Pierre-Louis (yellow card) 45+3'; Alidou 45+3', (yellow card) 78'; Bennett 50'; Minas (yellow card) 82'	Report	Stewart 36' (pen.); Baucom 70'; Robertson (yellow card) 84'	Stadium: Stade Boréale; Referee: Myriam Marcotte

August 29, 2026 18	Vancouver Rise	2–2	Calgary Wild	Burnaby, British Columbia
15:00 PT	Quinn 39' (pen.); Tumeth (yellow card) 74'; De Filippo 90+4'	Report	Thurton 12'; Johnson 42', (yellow card) 67'	Stadium: Swangard Stadium; Referee: Salma Flores-Desrochers

===== September =====
September 6, 2026 19	AFC Toronto	0–0	Calgary Wild	Toronto, Ontario
		Report	Baucom (yellow card) 53'	Stadium: BMO Field; Referee: Mathieu Souaré

September 12, 2026 20	Calgary Wild	1–0	Halifax Tides FC	Calgary, Alberta
	Stewart 48'; Otto (yellow card) 58'; Baucom (yellow card) 90+1'	Report	Weichers (yellow card) 24'	Stadium: McMahon Stadium; Referee: Anne-Marie Canuel

September 20, 2026 21	Ottawa Rapid FC	3–1	Calgary Wild	Ottawa, Ontario
	Okobi-Okeoghene 4', 78'; Fridlund 25'	Report	St-Jean 77'	Stadium: TD Place Stadium; Referee: Thomas Noel

September 27, 2026 22	Calgary Wild	3–1	Vancouver Rise FC	Calgary, Alberta
	Dougherty Howard (yellow card) 42' (goal) 56'; Otto 47'; Baucom 64'	Report	Lamontagne 35'	Stadium: McMahon Stadium; Attendance: 3,530; Referee: Alain Ruch

===== October =====
October 3, 2026 23	Halifax Tides FC	0–0	Calgary Wild	Halifax, Nova Scotia
2:00 PM		Report	Johnson (yellow card) 54'; Baucom (yellow card) 70'; Jones (yellow card) 75'; Pogarch (yellow card) 90+2'	Stadium: Wanderers Grounds; Attendance: 3,903; Referee: Isabelle Duclos

October 18, 2026 24	AFC Toronto	0–1	Calgary Wild	Toronto, Ontario
	Milanović (yellow card) 79'	Report	Baucom 5'; Jones (yellow card) 16'; Moore (yellow card) 41'	Stadium: BMO Field; Referee: Myriam Marcotte

October 25, 2026 25	Vancouver Rise FC	3–2	Calgary Wild	Burnaby, British Columbia
	Pante 7', 34'; De Filippo 53'; Bout (yellow card) 56'	Report	Otto (yellow card) 43'; Aulicino 45+2'; Baucom 69'	Stadium: Swangard Stadium; Referee: Sheila Couture

=== W Canadian Championship ===
August 5, 2026 Quarter-finals	Calgary Wild	4–0	CS Mont-Royal Outremont	Foothills County, Alberta
7:00 pm MDT	Jones 30', 47'; Otto 54'; Thurton 85'	Report		Stadium: ATCO Field; Attendance: 1,124; Referee: Alain Ruch

April 2027 Semi-finals	TBD	v	TBD	TBD
				Stadium: TBD

== Statistics ==
=== Appearances and goals ===
As of match played

No.	Pos	Nat	Player	Total		Northern Super League	
No.	Pos	Nat	Player	Apps	Goals	Apps	Goals
2	DF	(Canada) CAN	Grace Stordy	0	0	0	0
5	DF	(New Zealand) NZL	Meikayla Moore	0	0	0	0
6	MF	(Philippines) PHI	Jaclyn Sawicki	0	0	0	0
7	DF	(Canada) CAN	Caleigh Boeckx	0	0	0	0
8	MF	(Venezuela) VEN	Sonia O'Neill	0	0	0	0
11	DF	(Canada) CAN	Tilly James	0	0	0	0
15	FW	(Australia) AUS	Kahli Johnson	0	0	0	0
16	MF	(Canada) CAN	Jenaya Robertson	0	0	0	0
18	FW	(Canada) CAN	Serita Thurton	0	0	0	0
19	MF	(Wales) WAL	Keelyn Stewart	0	0	0	0
23	FW	(Canada) CAN	Kathryn Harvey	0	0	0	0
28	MF	(United States) USA	Meggie Dougherty Howard	0	0	0	0
30	MF	(Wales) WAL	Taegan Stewart	0	0	0	0
44	DF	(Canada) CAN	Talia White	0	0	0	0

== Transfers ==
=== In ===
No.	Pos.	Player	From club	Fee/notes	Date	Source
1	GK	(United States) Katelin Talbert	Free agent		16 January 2026	
3	MF	(United States) Allie Hess	(Canada) Montreal Roses FC		February 13, 2026	
23	GK	(Canada) Molly Race	(Denmark) FC Nordsjælland		February 13, 2026	
99	FW	(Canada) Mya Jones	Free agent		February 20, 2026	
22	MF	(United States) Hannah Boughton	(United States) Minnesota Aurora FC		July 21, 2026	
23	MF	(United States) Taylor Otto	(Australia) Melbourne City		July 28, 2026	
12	DF	(Canada) Frédérique St-Jean	(Canada) FC Laval		July 28, 2026	
41	DF	(United States) Madison Pogarch	(Sweden) Hammarby		July 28, 2026	

=== Out ===
No.	Pos.	Player	To club	Fee/notes	Date	Source
1	GK	(Croatia) Stephanie Bukovec	(Canada) Woodbridge Strikers		3 December 2025	
3	DF	(New Zealand) Ally Green	(Denmark) F.C. Copenhagen		3 December 2025	
9	DF	(Netherlands) Mijke Roelfsema	(France) FC Nantes		3 December 2025	
12	FW	(Canada) Christie Gray	(Republic of Ireland) Wexford		3 December 2025	
14	MF	(Canada) Madison Wilson			3 December 2025	
17	FW	(Canada) Danielle Steer			3 December 2025	
25	GK	(Northern Ireland) Jackie Burns	(England) Bristol City		4 February 2026	
9	FW	(Canada) Kathryn Harvey			20 July 2026	
17	DF	(Venezuela) Michelle Romero	(Brazil) Cruzeiro		30 July 2026	
