= 2025 Calgary Wild FC season =

Canadian soccer club's season of play

Calgary Wild FC
2025 season
- Chair: Deanna Zumwalt
- Head Coach: Lydia Bedford
- Stadium: McMahon Stadium; Calgary, Alberta
- Northern Super League: 5th
- Playoffs: DNQ
- Top goalscorer: League: Meggie Dougherty Howard (6); All: Meggie Dougherty Howard (6)
- Highest home attendance: 8,552 vs. Ottawa Rapid (May 11th)
- Lowest home attendance: 1,803 vs. Ottawa Rapid (July 19th)

The 2025 Calgary Wild FC season was the first in the club's history, as well as first season in Northern Super League history.

== Team ==
=== Coaching staff ===
As of February 20, 2025.

Position	Name
Head coach	(England) Lydia Bedford
Assistant coach	(England) Sinead McSharry

=== Roster ===
As of April 16, 2025.

No.	Nat.	Name	Date of birth (age)	Since	Previous club	Notes
Goalkeepers
1	(Croatia)	Stephanie Bukovec	September 22, 1995 (aged 29)	2025	(Belgium) Standard Liège	
26	(Canada)	Sarah Keilty-Dilling	July 15, 1993 (aged 31)	2025	–	
–	(Northern Ireland)	Jackie Burns	March 6, 1997 (aged 28)	2025	(England) Bristol City	INT
Defenders
2	(Canada)	Grace Stordy	January 21, 2002 (aged 23)	2025	(Canada) Calgary Foothills	
3	(New Zealand)	Ally Green	August 17, 1998 (aged 26)	2025	(Denmark) AGF	INT
5	(New Zealand)	Meikayla Moore	June 4, 1996 (aged 28)	2025	(Scotland) Glasgow City	INT
7	(Canada)	Caleigh Boeckx	July 26, 2000 (aged 24)	2025	(Republic of Ireland) Treaty United	
9	(Netherlands)	Mijke Roelfsema	March 11, 1998 (aged 27)	2025	(Republic of Ireland) Treaty United	
11	(Canada)	Tilly James	June 13, 1998 (aged 26)	2025	(Canada) Trinity Western Spartans	
44	(Canada)	Talia White	October 16, 1998 (aged 26)	2025	(Republic of Ireland) Treaty United	
Midfielders
6	(Philippines)	Jaclyn Sawicki	November 14, 1992 (aged 32)	2025	(Australia) Western United	
8	(Venezuela)	Sonia O'Neill	August 19, 1994 (aged 30)	2025	(England) London City Lionesses	
10	(Afghanistan)	Farkhunda Muhtaj	November 15, 1997 (aged 27)	2025	(Netherlands) Fortuna Sittard	
14	(Canada)	Madison Wilson	January 31, 2001 (aged 24)	2025	(United States) Iowa Hawkeyes	
16	(Canada)	Jenaya Robertson	April 8, 1997 (aged 27)	2025	(Canada) Unity FC	
19	(Canada)	Taegan Stewart	October 10, 2007 (aged 17)	2025	(Canada) ASA High Performance	
20	(United States)	Sarah Griffith	April 30, 1999 (aged 25)	2025	(United States) Chicago Stars	INT
28	(United States)	Meggie Dougherty Howard	July 27, 1995 (aged 29)	2025	(United States) Angel City	INT
30	(Wales)	Keelyn Stewart	October 10, 2007 (aged 17)	2025	(Canada) ASA High Performance	
Forwards
4	(United States)	Jorian Baucom	August 4, 1996 (aged 28)	2025	(United States) Fort Lauderdale	INT
12	(Canada)	Christie Gray	April 26, 1999 (aged 25)	2025	(Republic of Ireland) Shelbourne	
15	(Australia)	Kahli Johnson	February 18, 2004 (aged 21)	2025	(Australia) Western United	INT
17	(Canada)	Danielle Steer	April 29, 1999 (aged 25)	2025	(Republic of Ireland) Treaty United	
18	(Canada)	Serita Thurton	January 16, 2002 (aged 23)	2025	(United States) South Florida Bulls	
23	(Canada)	Kathryn Harvey	June 9, 1997 (aged 27)	2025	(Australia) Melbourne City	

== Competitions ==
=== Northern Super League ===
==== Table ====
Pos	Team	Pld	W	D	L	GF	GA	GD	Pts	Qualification
1	AFC Toronto (S)	25	16	3	6	42	24	+18	51	Advance to playoffs
2	Ottawa Rapid	25	11	6	8	41	26	+15	39 (Note: Head-to-head points tied 7–7; head-to-head goal difference: Ottawa Rapid +3, Vancouver Rise –3)	Advance to playoffs
3	Vancouver Rise (C)	25	11	6	8	38	36	+2	39	Advance to playoffs
4	Montreal Roses	25	10	6	9	30	23	+7	36	Advance to playoffs
5	Calgary Wild	25	9	2	14	26	42	−16	29	
6	Halifax Tides	25	3	7	15	17	43	−26	16	

Source: NSL
Rules for classification: 1) Head-to-head points; 2) Head-to-head goal difference; 3) Overall goal difference; 4) Most wins; 5) Most goals scored; 6) Least goals conceded; 7) Least red cards; 8) Least yellow cards; 9) Drawing of lots.
(C) Champion; (S) Supporters' Shield winner

==== Results by match ====
Match	1	2	3	4	5	6	7	8	9	10	11	12	13	14	15	16	17	18	19	20	21	22	23	24	25
Ground	A	A	A	H	H	A	H	H	A	A	H	H	A	H	A	H	A	A	A	H	H	A	H	H	H
Result	L	W	L	D	W	D	W	L	L	L	W	L	L	L	W	W	L	L	L	L	L	W	L	W	W
Position (Note: Positions show the situation at the end of the week the match was played, not the position at the conclusion of matches or game days.)	6	2	3	3	3	5	3	4	5	5	4	5	5	5	5	5	5	5	5	5	5	5	5	5	5
Points	0	3	3	4	7	8	11	11	11	11	14	14	14	14	17	20	20	20	20	20	20	23	23	26	29

Source: #Matches, , NSL on Instagram
H = Home; N = Neutral; A = Away; W = Win; D = Draw; L = Loss; = Playoffs

==== Matches ====
April 16 1	Vancouver Rise	1–0	Calgary Wild	Vancouver, British Columbia
20:00 MT	Quinn 22' (pen.); Spencer (yellow card) 23'; Sawan (yellow card) 87'	Report	Moore (yellow card) 14'; Dougherty Howard (yellow card) 39'	Stadium: BC Place; Attendance: 14,018; Referee: Marie-Soleil Beaudoin

April 26 2	Halifax Tides	1–4	Calgary Wild	Halifax, Nova Scotia
15:00 MT	Jónsdóttir (yellow card) 38'; Guay 60'; Olai (yellow card) 77'	Report	Moore 2'; Dougherty Howard 7'; Johnson 25', 81'	Stadium: Wanderers Grounds; Attendance: 5,508; Referee: Marie-Soleil Beaudoin

May 1 3	AFC Toronto	2–1	Calgary Wild	Toronto, Ontario
17:00 MT	Okoronkwo 25', 53'; Okoronkwo (yellow card) 71'; Hong (yellow card) 75'	Report	Stordy (yellow card) 13'; Moore (yellow card) 80'; Moore 85'	Stadium: York Lions Stadium; Attendance: 1,319; Referee: Salma Flores-Desrochers

May 11 4	Calgary Wild	0–0	Ottawa Rapid	Calgary, Alberta
17:00 MT		Report	Scott (yellow card) 39'; Hyo-joo (yellow card) 85'	Stadium: McMahon Stadium; Attendance: 8,552; Referee: Sheila Couture

May 18 5	Calgary Wild	1–0	Montreal Roses	Calgary, Alberta
15:00 MT	Robertson 85'; Dougherty Howard (yellow card) 90+2'; Moore (yellow card) 90+5'	Report	Schenk (yellow card) 11'; Leas (yellow card) 16'; Smith (yellow card) 83'; Whitaker (yellow card) 90+2'	Stadium: McMahon Stadium; Attendance: 3,502; Referee: Marie-Soleil Beaudoin

May 24 6	Vancouver Rise	1–1	Calgary Wild	Burnaby, British Columbia
17:00 MT	Lee 11'; De Filippo (yellow card) 49'; Pechersky (yellow card) 90+4'	Report	Johnson 16', (yellow card) 86'	Stadium: Swangard Stadium; Attendance: 3,045; Referee: Anne-Marie Canuel

June 5 7	Calgary Wild	3–2	Halifax Tides	Calgary, Alberta
19:00 MT	Green 23'; Robertson 41'; Stewart 45+3'; Gray (yellow card) 61'; O'Neill (yellow card) 87'; Wilson (yellow card) 88'	Report	Miller 72'; Nakamura 76'; Frémaux (yellow card) 80'	Stadium: McMahon Stadium; Attendance: 2,946; Referee: Salma Flores-Desrochers

June 14 8	Calgary Wild	1–2	AFC Toronto	Calgary, Alberta
15:00 MT	Stordy (yellow card) 20'; Dougherty Howard (yellow card) 43'; Steer 53'	Report	Regan (yellow card) 14'; Small 18', 26'	Stadium: McMahon Stadium; Attendance: 3,977; Referee: Isabelle Duclos

June 21 9	Ottawa Rapid	3–1	Calgary Wild	Ottawa, Ontario
12:00 MT	Pridham 32'; Forbes 65'; Adamek (yellow card) 81'; Golen 87'	Report	Moore (yellow card) 52'; O'Neill 83'	Stadium: TD Place Stadium; Attendance: 2,467; Referee: Sheila Couture

July 7 10	Halifax Tides	1–0	Calgary Wild	Halifax, Nova Scotia
15:30 MT	Nakamura 36'; Guay (yellow card) 58'; Seto (yellow card) 89'	Report	Wilson (yellow card) 88'	Stadium: Wanderers Grounds; Attendance: 4,332; Referee: Sheila Couture

July 12 11	Calgary Wild	2–1	Vancouver Rise	Burnaby, British Columbia
17:00 MT	Thurton 12'; Dougherty Howard (yellow card) 38' (goal) 41'; O'Neill (yellow card) 81'	Report	De Filippo 82'; Stanton (yellow card) 90+3'	Stadium: Swangard Stadium; Attendance: 3,061; Referee: Angelina Baldino

July 19 12	Calgary Wild	0–3	Ottawa Rapid	Calgary, Alberta
14:00 MT	Stordy (yellow card) 45+1'	Report	Belzile 12'; Pridham 22'; Moore 48' (o.g.)	Stadium: McMahon Stadium; Attendance: 1,803; Referee: Carly Shaw-MacLaren

July 26 13	Montreal Roses	2–0	Calgary Wild	Laval, Quebec
17:00 MT	Abdu 1'; Boychuk 6' (yellow card) 45+1'	Report	Robertson (yellow card) 45+2'; Green (yellow card) 57'; Stordy (yellow card) 79'; Gray (yellow card) 86'	Stadium: CS Bois-de-Boulogne; Attendance: 3,250; Referee: Carly Shaw-MacLaren

August 2 14	Calgary Wild	1–2	AFC Toronto	Calgary, Alberta
14:00 MT	Moore 8'	Report	Hunter 12'; Emma Regan 18'	Stadium: McMahon Stadium; Attendance: 2,676; Referee: Sheila Couture

August 9 15	Ottawa Rapid	0–1	Calgary Wild	Ottawa, Ontario
14:00 MT	Hyo-joo (yellow card) 66'; Scott (yellow card) 67'	Report	Sawicki 76'	Stadium: TD Place Stadium; Attendance: 2,666; Referee: Anne-Marie Canuel

August 16 16	Calgary Wild	1–0	Halifax Tides	Calgary, Alberta
14:00 MT	Harvey 59'; Baucom (yellow card) 83'	Report	Blouin (yellow card) 36'; Vallerand (yellow card) 70'; Leslie (yellow card) 74'	Stadium: McMahon Stadium; Attendance: 2,942; Referee: Isabelle Duclos

August 23 17	Montreal Roses	2–0	Calgary Wild	Laval, Quebec
10:30 MT	Chae-rim 44, 50'	Report	Baucom (yellow card) 61'; Romero (yellow card) 64'; White (yellow card) 90+4'	Stadium: CS Bois-de-Boulogne; Attendance: 2,800; Referee: Marie-Soleil Beaudoin

August 30 18	AFC Toronto	2–0	Calgary Wild	Toronto, Ontario
12:00 MT	Regan (yellow card) 45'; Burns 45+1', 47'	Report		Stadium: York Lions Stadium; Attendance: 2,589; Referee: Sheila Couture

September 6 19	Vancouver Rise	6–0	Calgary Wild	Burnaby, British Columbia
17:00 MT	Abdu 14', 52'; Chang (yellow card) 30'; De Filippo 45+4'; Quinn 64' (pen.); Lee 71'; Pechersky 77'	Report	O'Neill (yellow card) 42'; Gray (yellow card) 84'	Stadium: Swangard Stadium; Attendance: 3,897; Referee: Carly Shaw-MacLaren

September 13 20	Calgary Wild	0–5	Montreal Roses	Calgary, Alberta
14:00 MT	O'Neill (yellow card) 78'	Report	Hill 2'; Monyard 18'; Boychuk 51'; Paquin 75'; Thibault 82'	Stadium: McMahon Stadium; Attendance: 3,672; Referee: Salma Flores-Desrochers

September 17 21	Calgary Wild	1–2	Ottawa Rapid	Calgary, Alberta
19:00 MT	Haaland 15' (o.g.); Stordy (yellow card) 41'	Report	Benati 42'; Hyo-joo (yellow card) 44'; Forbes (yellow card) 45'; Adamek (yellow card) 80'; Pridham 90+2'; Golen (yellow card) 90+5'	Stadium: McMahon Stadium; Attendance: 2,428; Referee: Angelina Baldino

September 27 22	Montreal Roses	0–2	Calgary Wild	Laval, Quebec
10:00 MT	Lachance (yellow card) 86'; Bilbault (yellow card) 90+4'	Report	Thurton (yellow card) 43'; Dougherty Howard 45'; Baucom (yellow card) 45' (goal) 78'	Stadium: CS Bois-de-Boulogne; Attendance: 4,576; Referee: Marie-Soleil Beaudoin

October 4 23	Calgary Wild	1–2	AFC Toronto	Calgary, Alberta
14:00 MT	O'Neill (yellow card) 21'; Baucom 45+3'	Report	Hunter 19'; Uddenberg 34'; Novak (red card) 61'; Regan (yellow card) 69'	Stadium: McMahon Stadium; Attendance: 2,780; Referee: Anne-Marie Canuel

October 11 24	Calgary Wild	3–1	Halifax Tides	Calgary, Alberta
12:00 MT	Dougherty Howard 3, 49'; Stordy 42'; K. Stewart (yellow card) 43'	Report	Kennedy 26'; Olai (yellow card) 48'; Cedeno (yellow card) 50'	Stadium: McMahon Stadium; Attendance: 2,541; Referee: Sheila Couture

October 16 25	Calgary Wild	2–1	Vancouver Rise	Calgary, Alberta
19:00 MT	Doughery Howard 38'; Johnson 45'; Roelfsema (yellow card) 52'; Moore (yellow card) 70'; Bukovec (yellow card) 83'	Report	Cowart (yellow card) 37'; De Filippo {goal|71}}	Stadium: McMahon Stadium; Attendance: 2,881; Referee: Salma Flores-Desrochers

== Statistics ==
=== Appearances and goals ===
Players with no appearances not included in the list.

As of match played August 9 2025

No.	Pos	Nat	Player	Total		Northern Super League	
No.	Pos	Nat	Player	Apps	Goals	Apps	Goals
1	GK	(Croatia) CRO	Stephanie Bukovec	13	0	13	0
2	DF	(Canada) CAN	Grace Stordy	15	0	15	0
3	DF	(New Zealand) NZL	Ally Green	14	1	14	1
4	FW	(United States) USA	Jorian Baucom	3	0	3	0
5	DF	(New Zealand) NZL	Meikayla Moore	14	3	14	3
6	MF	(Philippines) PHI	Jaclyn Sawicki	13	1	13	1
7	DF	(Canada) CAN	Caleigh Boeckx	6	0	0+6	0
8	MF	(Venezuela) VEN	Sonia O'Neill	8	1	3+5	1
9	DF	(Netherlands) NED	Mijke Roelfsema	12	0	12	0
11	DF	(Canada) CAN	Tilly James	3	0	2+1	0
12	FW	(Canada) CAN	Christie Gray	13	0	6+7	0
14	FW	(Canada) CAN	Madison Wilson	8	0	3+5	0
15	FW	(Australia) AUS	Kahli Johnson	9	3	5+4	3
16	MF	(Canada) CAN	Jenaya Robertson	14	2	11+3	2
17	FW	(Canada) CAN	Danielle Steer	12	1	7+5	1
18	FW	(Canada) CAN	Serita Thurton	15	1	14+1	1
19	MF	(Wales) WAL	Keelyn Stewart	6	0	1+5	0
20	MF	(United States) USA	Sarah Griffith	6	0	4+2	0
23	FW	(Canada) CAN	Kathryn Harvey	3	0	3	0
25	GK	(Northern Ireland) NIR	Jackie Burns	2	0	2	0
28	MF	(United States) USA	Meggie Dougherty Howard	15	2	15	2
30	MF	(Wales) WAL	Taegan Stewart	12	1	4+8	1
44	DF	(Canada) CAN	Talia White	5	0	1+4	0
44	DF	(Canada) CAN	Clara Monck	1	0	0+1	0

=== Disciplinary record ===
The list is sorted by squad number when total cards are equal. Players with no cards not included in the list.

As of match played August 9 2025

No.	Pos	Nat	Player	Total			Northern Super League		
No.	Pos	Nat	Player	Yellow card	Second yellow card	Red card	Yellow card	Second yellow card	Red card
2	DF	(Canada) CAN	Grace Stordy	4	0	0	4	0	0
5	DF	(New Zealand) NZL	Meikayla Moore	4	0	0	4	0	0
28	MF	(United States) USA	Meggie Dougherty Howard	4	0	0	4	0	0
12	FW	(Canada) CAN	Christie Gray	2	0	0	2	0	0
3	MF	(New Zealand) NZL	Ally Green	1	0	0	1	0	0
8	MF	(Venezuela) VEN	Sonia O'Neill	1	0	0	1	0	0
15	FW	(Australia) AUS	Kahli Johnson	1	0	0	1	0	0
16	FW	(Canada) CAN	Jenaya Robertson	1	0	0	1	0	0

- (yellow card) = Number of bookings; (second yellow card) = Number of sending offs after a second yellow card; (red card) = Number of sending offs by a direct red card.

=== Clean sheets ===
The list is sorted by squad number when total clean sheets are equal. Numbers in parentheses represent games where both goalkeepers participated and both kept a clean sheet; the number in parentheses is awarded to the goalkeeper who was substituted on, whilst a full clean sheet is awarded to the goalkeeper who was on the field at the start of play. Goalkeepers with no clean sheets not included in the list.

As of match played August 9 2025

Rank	No.	Nat.	Goalkeeper	Northern Super League	Total
1	1	(Croatia)	Stephanie Bukovec	3	3
Total				3	3
