= Farkhunda Muhtaj =

Afghan footballer (born 1997)

Personal information
- Date of birth: November 15, 1997 (age 28)
- Place of birth: Pakistan
- Height: 5 ft 3 in (1.60 m)
- Position: Midfielder

College career
Years	Team	Apps	(Gls)
2015–2019	York Lions	57	(5)

Senior career*
Years	Team	Apps	(Gls)
2015–2018	Vaughan Azzurri	18+	(0)
2019	Durham United FA	13	(0)
2021	Vaughan Azzurri	7	(0)
2022	Fatih Vatan	8	(0)
2022–2024	Fortuna Sittard	8	(0)
2025–2026	Calgary Wild	0	(0)

International career
2016–2018	Afghanistan	6	(1)
- * Club domestic league appearances and goals as of September 5, 2026

Farkhunda Muhtaj (Dari: فرخنده محتاج; born November 15, 1997) is an Afghan footballer who plays as a midfielder. She was the captain of the Afghanistan national team and a key figure in the evacuation of the Afghanistan girls youth team from the country following the 2021 Taliban takeover.

== Early life ==
During the Afghan Civil War, Muhtaj's family fled from Afghanistan and sought sanctuary in Pakistan, where they lived without valid papers, and that was where she was born. Her family then moved to the Toronto, Ontario suburb of Scarborough in Canada in 2000, when she was two.

== University career ==
From 2015 to 2019, she attended York University, playing for the women's soccer team, serving as team captain in 2018 and 2019. She scored her first goal on October 25, 2015, against Algoma University. In 2018, she led the OUA with 11 assists. In 2019, she was named an OUA West Division First-team All-Star for the first time as the Lions won the OUA championship. In September 2020, she continued with the team as assistant coach.

== Club career ==
She began playing for Vaughan Azzurri in League1 Ontario in 2015. She made six league appearances in 2016, eight league appearances in 2017, and four league appearances in 2018.

In 2019, she began playing for Durham United FA making 13 league appearances.

In 2021, she returned to Vaughan Azzurri, making seven league appearances.

In 2021, following her work helping evacuate the Afghanistan youth girls team, she was invited to train with Portuguese club Benfica and also met with Spanish club Barcelona, as well as speaking to the members of the Barcelona Academy.

On March 3, 2022, she signed with Fatih Vatan S.K. of the Turkish Women's Football Super League.

On July 30, 2022, she signed with Dutch club Fortuna Sittard, a new expansion side in the women's Eredivisie.

In October 2024, she was announced as the first signing for Calgary Wild FC of the Northern Super League, ahead of the inaugural 2025 season. In September 2026, she agreed to a mdutual termination of the remainder of her contract.

== International career ==
In May 2016, Muhtaj attended an identification camp with the Afghanistan women's national football team. She then subsequently began playing for the team that year, eventually becoming team captain in 2018. She scored a goal against India on December 27, 2016, at the 2016 SAFF Women's Championship. In the summer of 2021, she spoke with the Afghanistan Football Federation about having the team compete in the FIFA Women's World Cup qualification for the first time, however, the 2021 Taliban offensive in Afghanistan put an end to that.

At the 2023 Unity Euro Cup, Farkhunda served as an ambassador for the Dutch refugee football team and played for the Dutch team.

== Career statistics ==
=== Club ===
As of July 2, 2026

Club	Season	League			Playoffs		Domestic Cup		League Cup		Total	
Club	Season	Division	Apps	Goals	Apps	Goals	Apps	Goals	Apps	Goals	Apps	Goals
Vaughan Azzurri	2015	League1 Ontario	?	?	—		—		?	?	?	?
Vaughan Azzurri	2016	League1 Ontario	6	0	—		—		?	?	6	0
Vaughan Azzurri	2017	League1 Ontario	8	0	—		—		?	?	8	0
Vaughan Azzurri	2018	League1 Ontario	4	0	0	0	—		?	?	4	0
Vaughan Azzurri	Total		18	0	0	0	0	0	0	0	18	0
Durham United FA	2019	League1 Ontario	13	0	—		—		—		13	0
Vaughan Azzurri	2021	League1 Ontario	7	0	0	0	—		—		7	0
Fatih Vatan S.K.	2021–22	Turkish Women's Football Super League	8	0	1	0	—		—		9	0
Fortuna Sittard	2022-23	Eredivisie	2	0	—		0	0	1	0	3	0
Fortuna Sittard	2023-24	Eredivisie	6	0	—		1	0	1	0	8	0
Fortuna Sittard	Total		8	0	0	0	1	0	2	0	11	0
Calgary Wild FC	2025	Northern Super League	0	0	—		—		—		0	0
Calgary Wild FC	2026	Northern Super League	0	0	—		—		—		0	0
Calgary Wild FC	Total		0	0	0	0	0	0	0	0	0	0
Career total			54	0	1	0	1	0	2	0	58	0

=== International ===
As of match played December 1, 2018

Appearances and goals by national team and year
National team	Year	Apps	Goals
Afghanistan	2016	2	1
Afghanistan	2017	0	0
Afghanistan	2018	4	0
Total		6	1

==== International goals ====
No.	Date	Venue	Opponent	Score	Result	Competition
1.	27 December 2016	Kanchenjunga Stadium, Siliguri, India	India	1–4	1–5	2016 SAFF Women's Championship

== Operation Soccer Balls ==
Following the takeover of Afghanistan by the Taliban in August 2021, women's rights were severely restricted, including the banning of female sports. Muhtaj, who lived in Canada and was the captain of the Afghanistan women's team, was part of a group that was formed to help a group of 80 people composed of the 26-member Afghan female youth team aged 14 to 16 and their families flee the country. The Afghanistan Football Federation reached out to Muhtaj on August 14, who joined the girls' WhatsApp group to help co-ordinate the departure, serving as the only point of contact for the group. The rescue mission, which was called Operation Soccer Balls, was coordinated through an international coalition of former U.S. military and intelligence officials, United States Senator Chris Coons, United States allies, and humanitarian groups, with her connection to the US personnel aided through her relationship with her former mentor and former Iranian player and coach Katayoun Khosrowyar. The mission initially suffered multiple setbacks, including several failed rescue attempts and a suicide bombing carried out by Islamic State militants, with the group having to go into hiding after being unable to leave before the August 31 deadline for safe passage out of the country had passed. The group landed and was granted asylum in Portugal on September 19. On September 29, she arrived in Portugal to meet the group. She remained in Portugal with the team to help guide them. A second evacuation flight bringing over other players and additional family members arrived in November. In August 2023, WhatsApp released a film entitled We Are Ayenda on Amazon Prime, documenting the story.

== Personal ==
Muhtaj is an Ontario Certified Teacher after having graduated from York University's Bachelor of Education program. She has a National C coaching license.

On the Italian television show Crush - La storia di Tamina, Muhtaj is the idol of the main character of the show (Tamina), a 13-year old Afghan girl who loves to play soccer and has a poster of Muhtaj in her bedroom.

In 2020, Muhtaj co-founded the Scarborough Simbas, a program which offers free recreational and wellness opportunities for newcomers, refugees, underprivileged and at-risk Muslim youth, which helps participants to learn to connect with their communities and understand the fabric of Canadian society through sport.

In 2023, she joined the League1 Ontario Women's Football Subcommittee.
