= Boeckx =

Boeckx is a surname. Notable people with the name include:

- Frank Boeckx (born 1986), Belgian footballer
- Caleigh Boeckx (born 2000), Canadian soccer player
