= Madison Wilson (soccer) =

Canadian soccer player (born 2007)

- Wilson in 2025

Personal information
- Date of birth: October 9, 2002 (age 24)
- Place of birth: London, Ontario, Canada
- Height: 5 ft 9 in (1.75 m)
- Position: Midfielder

Youth career
- London Galaxy FC
- London FA

College career
Years	Team	Apps	(Gls)
2020–2023	Dayton Flyers	50	(9)
2024	Iowa Hawkeyes	22	(1)

Senior career*
Years	Team	Apps	(Gls)
2022	FC London	6	(0)
2023	Electric City FC	12	(3)
2025	Calgary Wild FC	19	(0)
- * Club domestic league appearances and goals as of October 17, 2025

Madison Wilson (born October 9, 2002) is a Canadian soccer player.

== Early life ==
Wilson played youth soccer with London Galaxy FC and the London Football Academy.

== College career ==
In 2020, Wilson began attending Dayton University, where she played for the women's soccer team. On February 6, 2021, she scored her first goal in a 2-0 victory over the Bellarmine Knights. At the end of her first season, she was named to the Atlantic 10 Conference All-Freshman Team. She did not play during the 2022 season. She was named to the Atlantic 10 Commissioner's Honor Roll during her first three years. On September 21, 2023, she scored a brace in a 3-0 victory over the Davidson Wildcats.

In 2024, she began attending the University of Iowa as a graduate student and joined the women's soccer team. She scored her first goal on October 27 against the Minnesota Golden Gophers.

== Club career ==
In 2022, Wilson played with FC London in League1 Ontario.

In March 2023, she joined Electric City FC in League1 Ontario.

In March 2025, she signed with Calgary Wild FC of the Northern Super League. On December 3, 2025, it was announced that she had been released from the Wild following the conclusion of the inaugural 2025 season.

== Career statistics ==
As of October 17, 2025

Club	Season	League			Playoffs		Domestic Cup		Other		Total	
Club	Season	Division	Apps	Goals	Apps	Goals	Apps	Goals	Apps	Goals	Apps	Goals
FC London	2022	League1 Ontario	6	0	0	0	—		—		6	0
Electric City FC	2023	League1 Ontario	12	3	—		—		—		12	3
Calgary Wild	2025	Northern Super League	19	0	—		—		—		19	0
Career total			37	3	0	0	0	0	0	0	37	3
