= Electric City FC =

Canadian soccer team

- Full name: Electric City Football Club
- Short name: ECFC
- Founded: August 9, 2021
- Dissolved: January 9, 2024
- Stadium: Fleming College Stadium
- Capacity: 2,000
- Owner: Gregory Couch
- League: League1 Ontario
- 2023: League, 7th; Playoffs, DNQ (men); League, 8th; Playoffs, DNQ (women)
- Website: https://www.electriccityfc.com/

Electric City Football Club was a Canadian semi-professional soccer team based in Peterborough, Ontario, that competed in League1 Ontario's men's and women's division than played two seasons in 2022 and 2023.

== History ==
=== Formation ===
The presence of soccer in Peterborough is large despite its small size, and the club is an initiative for the city to take pride in its community, not just for soccer enthusiasts. The history of the sport in the city dates back to the 1880s, and with two college and university teams, highly skilled OWSL and OSL teams, as well as multiple local youth clubs, soccer has held a significant presence in Peterborough.

The club's origins begin in late 2019, when former Canadian national team and Toronto FC player Adrian Cann met local community leader Keaton Robbins who was part of a group who was discussing the possibility of a team in the region, later joined by local business leaders Neil Morton and Richard Wood. Robbins first discussed the idea back in 2014 with League1 Ontario commissioner, Dino Rossi. Robbins also connected with Rob Jenkins, who was manager of football operations with Cavalry FC of the Canadian Premier League, who joined the project.

In August 2020, the club formed a partnership with local youth club Maple Leaf Cavan FC to serve as a feeder system, later expanding the affiliations to include four other local youth clubs - Peterborough City SC, Peterborough Youth SC, Northumberland United and Kawartha Lakes SC - in 2022. The group initially intended to build a 3,000 seat outdoor stadium on the former Rona property on Chemong Road. The club has previously approached Trent University about potentially using its Justin Chiu Stadium until a permanent facility is completed on Chemong Road.

Their goal was originally to try to get an expansion team for 2021 in League1 Ontario, a semi-professional league, underneath the top tier Canadian Premier League, although Morton said 2022 may be more realistic, with the ultimate goal being to eventually join the Canadian Premier League. Morton said the goal is to start with a men's team and eventually add a women's side. Cann was initially expected to serve as the team's head coach. In January 2021, the club announced that they delayed their application to the league to 2022, in part due to the uncertainty caused by the COVID-19 pandemic.

=== Official announcement ===
Electric City FC secondary logo

The club was officially announced in August 2021, announcing their intention to join the semi-professional League1 Ontario in 2022, as well as a women's team in 2023, with businessman Rob Couch serving as majority owner, alongside some other minority owners, as well as Rob Jenkins as Club President with Keaton Robbins also involved. Upon its launch, the club revealed aspirations of joining the professional Canadian Premier League, as early as 2024. The club would announce their first head coach later in the fall. (However, by the opening of the first season, Couch assumed full control and refunded the investments of the other minority owners). The club officially joined League1 Ontario in October 2021, after acquiring the L1O license held by Toronto Skillz FC. They also announced their intention to build a 74-acre Sports Complex on the edge of Peterborough including a soccer-specific stadium for the club to be completed within three years. In November 2021, they announced they would field a women's team in League1 Ontario women's division for the 2022, a year earlier than their original expectation. However, prior to the season's launch Keaton Robbins, a major driving force in the club's creation, departed the club and the club also parted ways with head coach Michael Marcoccia, replacing him with Jamie Sherwood prior to the team's first match.

=== Playing history (2022-2023) ===
The men's team played their first match on April 21, 2022, ending in a 0–0 draw against defending champions Guelph United F.C. They played their first home match on May 7 at Fleming College, earning their first ever victory, defeating Windsor TFC 3–0, while setting a League1 Ontario attendance record of 1565. The women's team played their first match on the road on April 23, defeating Alliance United 2–1. The women's team set a League1 Ontario women's attendance record, with 1009, in their home opener on May 14 in 4–1 victory over Blue Devils FC.

After just four matches into their first season, the club parted way with head coach Jamie Sherwood, their second coaching change within their first season, replacing him with Randy Ribeiro as interim coach of both the men's and women's teams. In addition, mid-way through the season, club president Rob Jenkins also departed the club. In their inaugural seasons, the men's team finished in tenth place, while the women's team finished in eighth place in the league, with both teams failing to qualify for the playoffs.

Ahead of the 2023 season, the club confirmed Ribeiro as the permanent coach of both sides. In their second season, the men's and women's teams finished in seventh and eighth place respectively, missing out on the playoffs (top six) for the second consecutive season. In addition, the club's attendance dropped to approximately 200 fans per match, falling from a 500+ average in their debut season. Despite qualifying for the league's Premier Division for 2024, the club chose to part ways with head coach Ribeiro, after the season, with club owner Couch mentioning that the club failing to qualify for the playoffs for the second consecutive season fell below his expectations.

=== Dissolution ===
In January 2024, after declining fan attendance and ownership mismanagement, the club folded and departed the league and sold their licenses to Pickering FC. During their time in the league, the club had the highest payroll spending in the league.

== Partnerships ==
In February 2022, they announced a partnership with Ontario Hockey League club, the Peterborough Petes, to work together with cross-promotional opportunities. In March 2022, they partnership with Bobcaygeon Brewing Co. to create an official beer for the team called Electric Ale. The club has reached sponsorship agreements with companies such as Mercedes-Benz, Mark’s and Leon's, while also selling club merchandise in local stores.

The club announced partnerships with former League1 Ontario club Toronto Skillz FC to field their U21 L1O men's Reserve team and FC Durham (who had previously been part of the women's FC Oshawa team) to field their women's reserve team and men's U19 reserve team (both clubs will enter the reserve division under their own club names).

In March 2022, the team announced a partnership with Fleming College for the use of its Sports Complex for Electric City FC's home games.

== Seasons ==
=== Men ===
Season	League	Teams	Record	Rank	Playoffs	Ref
2022	League1 Ontario	22	8–6–7	10th	Did not qualify	
2023	League1 Ontario	21	11–4–5	7th	Did not qualify	

=== Women ===
Season	League	Teams	Record	Rank	Playoffs	Ref
2022	League1 Ontario	20	10–2–7	8th	Did not qualify	
2023	League1 Ontario	19	8–3–7	8th	Did not qualify	

== Notable players ==
The following players have either played at the professional or international level, either before or after playing for the League1 Ontario team:

=== Men ===
- (Canada) (Ukraine) Svyatik Artemenko
- (England) Jordan Brown
- (Canada) Zak Drake
- (Canada) Zachary Ellis-Hayden
- (Canada) Luke Green
- (Canada) Eleias Himaras
- (Guyana) (Canada) Quillan Roberts
- (Cayman Islands) Elijah Seymour
- (Canada) Jordan Webb

=== Women ===
- (Canada) Holly O'Neill
- (Guyana) (Canada) Rylee Traicoff
- (Trinidad and Tobago) Victoria Swift
- (Canada) Serita Thurton
- (Canada) Madison Wilson
