= Katelin Talbert =

American soccer player (born 1998)

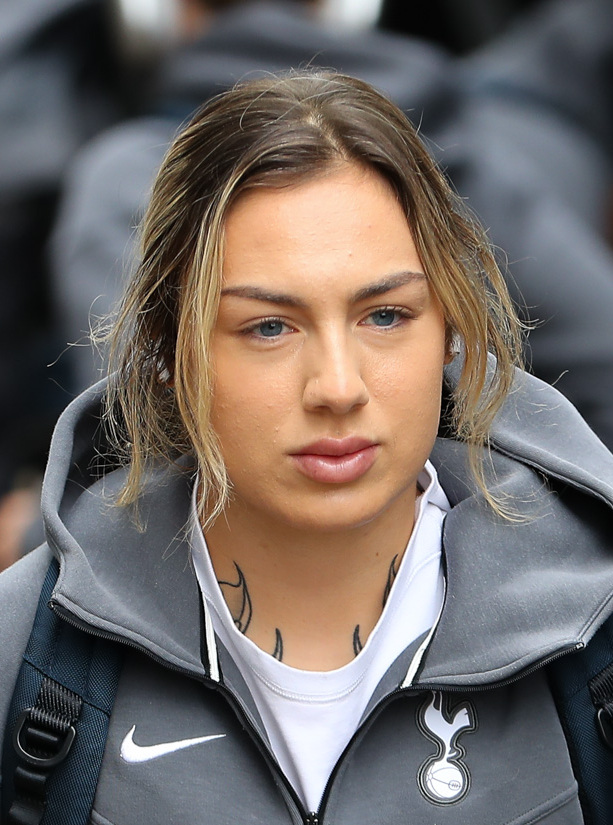
- Talbert in 2024

Personal information
- Full name: Katelin Shawne Talbert
- Date of birth: October 9, 1998 (age 28)
- Place of birth: Sacramento, California, United States
- Height: 6 ft 0 in (1.83 m)
- Position: Goalkeeper

Team information
- Current team: Calgary Wild FC
- Number: 1

College career
Years	Team	Apps	(Gls)
2016–2019	Humboldt State Lumberjacks	38	(0)

Senior career*
Years	Team	Apps	(Gls)
2021–2022	FH Hafnarfjörður	1	(0)
2022–2023	S.L. Benfica	15	(0)
2023–2025	West Ham United	0	(0)
2023–2024	→ Djurgårdens IF (loan)	13	(0)
2024	→ Tottenham Hotspur (loan)	0	(0)
2025	→ Aston Villa (loan)	1	(0)
2026–	Calgary Wild FC	15	(0)
- * Club domestic league appearances and goals as of October 28, 2026

Katelin Shawne Talbert (born October 9, 1998) is an American professional soccer player who plays as a goalkeeper for Northern Super League club Calgary Wild FC.

== Early life ==
Talbert grew up in Sacramento, California, where she attended Rio Americano High School and played on the soccer team. She then went on to play goalkeeper for Humboldt State Lumberjacks from 2016 to 2020.

== College career ==
During her career at HSU, she started in 37 of the 38 matches she played. She played in over 3,460 minutes in goal posting a 1.24 goals against average. Talbert gave up 48 goals and recorded 179 saves for a .793 saves percentage. In 2017, Talbert earned a California Collegiate Athletic Association All-Conference honorable mention for her 1.08 goals against average while recording 76 saves and six wins. In 2019, Talbert earned Pac North All-Conference honors and in 2020 she was named Pac North Defensive Player of the Year. Talbert had eight shutouts in goal during her career at Humboldt State. As a student-athlete Talbert made the Humboldt State Academic Deans List in 2020. She graduated from Cal Poly Humboldt with a Bachelor of Science degree in Wildlife Conservation and Management.

== Club career ==
=== Fimleikafélag Hafnarfjarðar ===
In March 2021, Talbert signed with her first professional club, FHingar, the women's football department of the Fimleikafélag Hafnarfjarðar multi-sport club. The team finished the season 11–3–4 with Talbert recording 46 saves in goal. After playing for FHingar, Talbert trained with the West Ham United women in London from September to December 2021.

=== Benfica ===
In January 2022, Talbert joined Sport Lisboa e Benfica, commonly known as Benfica, a Portuguese women's football team based in Lisbon that plays in the Campeonato Nacional Feminino. In her year and a half at Benfica, she played in 23 matches and won two Campeonato Nacional Feminino titles, the League Cup (Taça da Liga Feminina), and the Portuguese Super Cup (Supertaça de Portugal Feminina). Talbert was elected by the Players Union as the best goalkeeper of the 2021–22 Liga BPI. Her contract ended with Sport Lisboa e Benfica, on June 30, 2023.

=== West Ham United ===
In August 2023, Talbert signed with West Ham United Women Football Club, an English women's football club affiliated with West Ham United. The club plays in the Women's Super League, the top tier of English women's football. Talbert was immediately sent out on loan to Swedish side Djurgårdens IF in a bid to accumulate the points needed to meet Governing Body Endorsements [GBE] requirements for the International Sportsperson visa. She made nine appearances for the club in the Damallsvenskan, helping The Blue Stripes to avoid an end of season relegation play-off. In June 2024, Talbert was transferred back to West Ham United.

She was loaned out to Aston Villa in January 2025 and made her debut as a second-half substitute for Sabrina D'Angelo on March 2, 2025, during a 2–0 loss against Everton at Villa Park.

=== Calgary Wild FC ===
In January 2026, she signed with Canadian Northern Super League club Calgary Wild FC, with Talbert saying of the move “The opportunity to be part of a new professional league in Canada and contribute to building a strong, competitive team really aligns with my love for growth, competition, and inspiring the next generation of women in soccer.”

== Career statistics ==
=== Club ===
As of match played October 28, 2026

Appearances and goals by club, season and competition
Club	Season	League			National cup (Note: Includes Bikarkeppni kvenna, Taça de Portugal, Svenska Cupen, Women's FA Cup)		League cup (Note: Includes Lengjubikar kvenna, Taça da Liga, Women's League Cup)		Continental (Note: Includes UEFA Women's Champions League)		Other		Total	
Club	Season	Division	Apps	Goals	Apps	Goals	Apps	Goals	Apps	Goals	Apps	Goals	Apps	Goals
Fimleikafélag Hafnarfjarðar	2021	1. deild kvenna	1	0	2	0	0	0	—		—		3	0
Benfica	2021–22	Campeonato Nacional Feminino	8	0	0	0	2	0	—		—		10	0
Benfica	2022–23	Campeonato Nacional Feminino	7	0	1	0	2	0	2	0	1 (Note: Appearance(s) in Supertaça de Portugal)	0	13	0
Benfica	Total		15	0	1	0	4	0	2	0	1	0	23	0
Djurgårdens IF (loan)	2023	Damallsvenskan	9	0	2	0	—		—		—		11	0
Djurgårdens IF (loan)	2024	Damallsvenskan	5	0	0	0	—		—		—		5	0
Djurgårdens IF (loan)	Total		14	0	2	0	—		—		—		16	0
Tottenham Hotspur (loan)	2024–25	Women's Super League	0	0	0	0	1	0	—		—		1	0
West Ham United	2024–25	Women's Super League	0	0	0	0	0	0	—		—		0	0
Aston Villa (loan)	2024–25	Women's Super League	1	0	0	0	0	0	—		—		0	0
Calgary Wild FC	2026	Northern Super League	15	0	1	0	0	0	0	0	0	0	16	0
Career total			46	0	6	0	5	0	2	0	1	0	60	0

== Honors ==
Benfica

- Campeonato Nacional Feminino: 2021–22, 2022–23
- Taça da Liga Feminina: 2022–23
- Supertaça de Portugal Feminina: 2022–23
