= Keelyn Stewart =

Canadian-Welsh footballer (born 2007)

Personal information
- Full name: Keelyn Mai Stewart
- Date of birth: 10 October 2007 (age 19)
- Place of birth: Calgary, Alberta, Canada
- Height: 1.65 m (5 ft 5 in)
- Position: Midfielder

Team information
- Current team: Calgary Wild FC
- Number: 19

Youth career
- Suburban FC
- Calgary Foothills FC
- 2022–2023: Vancouver Whitecaps

Senior career*
Years	Team	Apps	(Gls)
2023	Whitecaps FC Girls Elite	4	(1)
2024	ASA High Performance	11	(2)
2025–	Calgary Wild FC	22	(1)
2026–	→ Calgary Wild FC U23	1	(1)

International career^{‡}
2022	Canada U15	4	(0)
2024–	Wales U19	3	(0)
- * Club domestic league appearances and goals as of October 28, 2026 ‡ National team caps and goals as of 20 February 2025

Keelyn Mai Stewart (born 10 October 2007) is a footballer who plays as a midfielder for Calgary Wild FC in the Northern Super League. Born in Canada, she has also represented Wales at youth international level.

== Early life ==
Keelyn was born in Calgary, but moved to Halifax at age one and began playing soccer with Suburban FC at age three, before moving back to Calgary at age four. In Calgary, she played youth soccer with Calgary Foothills WFC. At age ten, she trained with the boys Barcelona Academy, returning a year later to play on an all-boys team at the Barca Academy World Cup. In August 2022, she joined the Whitecaps FC Girls Elite.

In 2023, she began training with German club SC Freiburg's U17 and U20 teams periodically for two years, and was set to join their U20 side on a permanent basis in 2025, however, she signed a professional contract instead with another club.

== Club career ==
In 2023, she played with Whitecaps FC Girls Elite in League1 British Columbia. She won the league and national title with the Whitecaps. In 2024, she played with ASA High Performance in League1 Alberta.

In January 2025, she signed a professional contract with Northern Super League club Calgary Wild FC. At the time of her signing, she was the joint-youngest player (alongside her twin sister) to sign a contract with a team in the league. She made her first start for the Wild and provided the assist for Calgary's first goal in a 3–1 win over Halifax Tides FC on 11 October 2025, the penultimate home game of the Wild's inaugural season.

== International career ==
Keelyn made her debut in the Canada national program with the Canada U15 at the 2022 CONCACAF Girls' U-15 Championship. She earned an assist on a goal scored by her twin sister on August 1, 2015 against Jamaica U15.

In October 2024, she was named to the Wales U19 team for a friendly against Portugal U19.

== Personal life ==
She is the twin sister of fellow professional player Taegan Stewart.

== Career statistics ==
As of October 28, 2026

Appearances and goals by club, season and competition
Club	Season	League			Playoffs		National cup		Continental		Other		Total	
Club	Season	Division	Apps	Goals	Apps	Goals	Apps	Goals	Apps	Goals	Apps	Goals	Apps	Goals
Whitecaps FC Girls Elite	2023	League1 British Columbia	4	1	1	0	—		—		1 (Note: Appearance(s) in Women's Inter-Provincial Championship)	0	6	1
ASA High Performance	2024	League1 Alberta	11	2	—		—		—		—		11	2
Calgary Wild	2025	Northern Super League	7	0	—		—		—		—		7	0
Calgary Wild	2026	Northern Super League	15	1	0	0	1	0	—		—		16	1
Calgary Wild	Total		22	1	0	0	1	0	0	0	0	0	23	1
Career total			37	4	1	0	0	0	1	0	1	0	40	4
