= Jackie Burns (footballer, born 1997) =

Northern Irish footballer

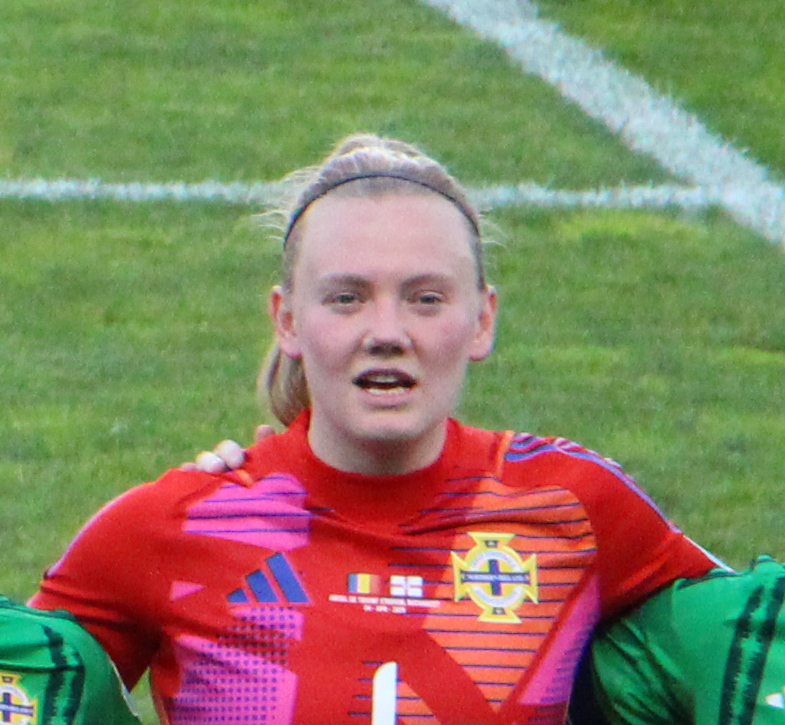

Personal information
- Full name: Jacqueline Denise Burns
- Date of birth: 6 March 1997 (age 29)
- Place of birth: Cookstown, Northern Ireland
- Height: 1.73 m (5 ft 8 in)
- Position: Goalkeeper

Team information
- Current team: Burnley

Youth career
- Cookstown Youth

College career
Years	Team	Apps	(Gls)
2015–2018	Carson–Newman Eagles	66	(0)

Senior career*
Years	Team	Apps	(Gls)
2011–2015	Mid-Ulster		
2019	ÍBV		
2020–2021	Glentoran		
2022	BK Häcken	2	(0)
2022–2024	Reading	14	(0)
2024	Bristol City	1	(0)
2025–2026	Calgary Wild FC	2	(0)
2026	Bristol City	0	(0)
2026–	Burnley	0	(0)

International career^{‡}
2013–	Northern Ireland	69	(0)
2015	Northern Ireland U19	2	(0)
- * Club domestic league appearances and goals as of 4 February 2026 ‡ National team caps and goals as of 18 October 2026

Jacqueline Denise Burns (born 6 March 1997) is a Northern Irish footballer who plays as a goalkeeper for Burnley and the Northern Ireland women's national team. She previously played college soccer in the United States for Carson–Newman University and club football in England, Sweden, and Canada.

== Early life ==
Burns started playing football in Ireland for Cookstown Youth and Mid-Ulster Ladies.

== College career ==
Burns played in the United States for the Carson–Newman University's women's soccer team

== Club career ==
Burns signed for Icelandic side ÍBV for the 2019 season, in July of that year. On 24 August 2020, Glentoran announced the signing of Burns.

On 10 March 2022, Burns joined Swedish team BK Häcken on a two-year professional contract. On 24 June 2022, Häcken announced that Burns had left the club by mutual consent.

On 5 August 2022, Reading announced that Burns had signed for the club. On 21 September 2023, Burns signed a new contract with Reading. On 2 July 2024, Reading announced the departure of Burns after their demotion to the Southern Region Women's Football League and she then joined Bristol City.

On 28 March 2025, Burns signed with Calgary Wild FC, joining the recently established team in their debut season in the Northern Super League. She made her debut on 14 June 2025 against AFC Toronto.

On 4 February 2026, Burns re-signed with Women's Super League 2 club Bristol City for the remainder of the 2025–26 season. In June 2026, Bristol City announced that Burns had departed the club following the end of her contract.

On 20 July 2026, Burns was announced at Burnley.

== International career ==
Burns has been capped for the Northern Ireland national team, appearing for the team during the 2019 FIFA Women's World Cup qualifying cycle. According to the Irish Football Association, Burns made her senior debut on 3 July 2013, in a 3–0 defeat by the Netherlands.

Burns was part of the squad that was called up to the UEFA Women's Euro 2022. She played in three group games at the tournament.

== Career statistics ==
As of match played 21 June 2025

Appearances and goals by club, season and competition
Club	Season	League			National Cup		League Cup		Continental		Other		Total	
Club	Season	Division	Apps	Goals	Apps	Goals	Apps	Goals	Apps	Goals	Apps	Goals	Apps	Goals
BK Häcken	2022	Damallsvenskan	2	0	0	0	0	0	0	0	0	0	2	0
Reading	2022–23	FA Women's Super League	10	0	0	0	2	0	—		—		12	0
Reading	2023–24	Women's Championship	4	0	0	0	2	0	—		—		6	0
Reading	Total		14	0	0	0	2	0	—		—		18	0
Bristol City W.F.C.	2024-25	Women's Championship	0	0	0	0	1	0	—		—		1	0
Calgary Wild	2025	Northern Super League	2	0	—		—		—		—		2	0
Career total			18	0	0	0	3	0	—		—		21	0
