= Taegan Stewart =

Canadian-Welsh footballer (born 2007)

Personal information
- Full name: Taegan Pryce Stewart
- Date of birth: October 10, 2007 (age 19)
- Place of birth: Calgary, Alberta, Canada
- Height: 1.65 m (5 ft 5 in)
- Position: Midfielder

Team information
- Current team: Calgary Wild FC
- Number: 30

Youth career
- Suburban FC
- Calgary Foothills FC
- 2022–2023: Vancouver Whitecaps

Senior career*
Years	Team	Apps	(Gls)
2023	Whitecaps FC Girls Elite	4	(1)
2024	ASA High Performance	11	(7)
2025–	Calgary Wild FC	39	(5)

International career^{‡}
2022	Canada U15	5	(2)
2024–	Wales U19	1	(0)
- * Club domestic league appearances and goals as of October 28, 2026 ‡ National team caps and goals as of October 25, 2024

Taegan Pryce Stewart (born October 10, 2007) is a soccer player who plays for Calgary Wild FC in the Northern Super League. Born in Canada, she has also represented Wales at youth international level.

== Early life ==
Taegan was born in Calgary, but moved to Halifax at age one and began playing soccer with Suburban FC at age three, before moving back to Calgary at age four. In Calgary, she played youth soccer with Calgary Foothills WFC. At age ten, she trained with the boys Barcelona Academy, returning a year later to play on an all-boys team at the Barca Academy World Cup. In August 2022, she joined the Whitecaps FC Girls Elite.

In 2023, she began training with German club SC Freiburg's U17 and U20 teams periodically for two years, and was set to join their U20 side on a permanent basis in 2025, however, she signed a professional contract instead with another club.

== Club career ==
In 2023, she played with Whitecaps FC Girls Elite in League1 British Columbia. She won the league and national title with the Whitecaps. In 2024, she played with ASA High Performance in League1 Alberta.

In January 2025, she signed a professional contract with Northern Super League club Calgary Wild FC. At the time of her signing, she was the joint-youngest player (alongside her twin sister) to sign a contract with a team in the league. On April 16, 2025, she came on as a substitute in the league's inaugural game, a 1-0 defeat to Vancouver Rise FC. On June 5, 2025, she scored her first professional goal, in a 3-2 victory over the Halifax Tides.

== International career ==
Taegan made her debut in the Canada national program with the Canada U15 at the 2022 CONCACAF Girls' U-15 Championship. She scored a goal assisted by her twin sister on August 1, 2015 against Jamaica U15. In doing so, Taegan became the first Canadian youth international to score with an assist from her twin sister.

In October 2024, she was named to the Wales U19 team for a friendly against Portugal U19.

In May 2026, she was called up to the Canada U20 for a pair of international friendlies.

== Personal life ==
She is the twin sister of fellow professional player Keelyn Stewart.

== Career statistics ==
As of October 28, 2026

Club	Season	League			Playoffs		Domestic Cup		Continental		Other		Total	
Club	Season	Division	Apps	Goals	Apps	Goals	Apps	Goals	Apps	Goals	Apps	Goals	Apps	Goals
Whitecaps FC Girls Elite	2023	League1 British Columbia	4	1	1	0	—		—		1 (Note: Appearance(s) in Women's Inter-Provincial Championship)	0	6	1
ASA High Performance	2024	League1 Alberta	11	7	—		—		—		—		11	7
Calgary Wild	2025	Northern Super League	17	1	—		—		—		—		17	1
Calgary Wild	2026	Northern Super League	22	4	0	0	1	0	—		—		23	4
Calgary Wild	Total		39	5	0	0	1	0	0	0	0	0	40	5
Career total			53	14	1	0	1	0	0	0	1	0	56	14
