= Meggie Dougherty Howard =

American soccer player (born 1995)

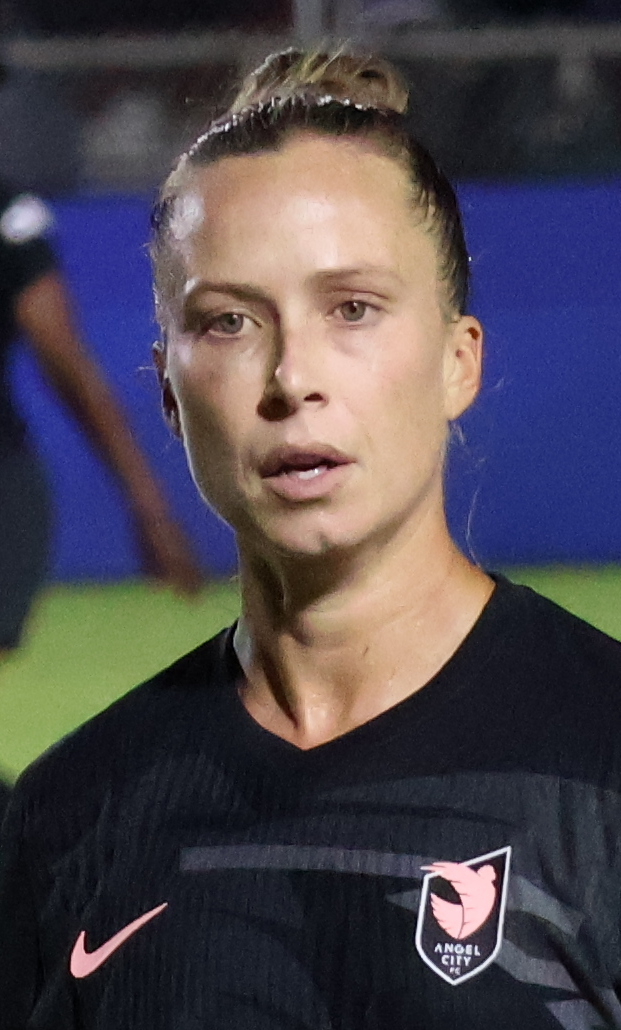
- Dougherty Howard with Angel City in 2024

Personal information
- Full name: Megan Dougherty Howard
- Date of birth: July 27, 1995 (age 31)
- Place of birth: Largo, Florida, United States
- Height: 5 ft 5 in (1.65 m)
- Position: Midfielder

Team information
- Current team: Calgary Wild FC
- Number: 28

Youth career
- Tampa Bay United
- Strictly Soccer FC
- 2015: Washington Spirit Reserves

College career
Years	Team	Apps	(Gls)
2013–2016	Florida Gators	94	(14)

Senior career*
Years	Team	Apps	(Gls)
2017–2020	Washington Spirit	68	(1)
2021–2022	Orlando Pride	35	(3)
2023	San Diego Wave	12	(0)
2024	Angel City FC	18	(1)
2025–	Calgary Wild	41	(10)

International career
2011	United States U15		
2016–2017	United States U23		
- * Club domestic league appearances and goals as of October 28, 2026

Megan "Meggie" Dougherty Howard (born July 27, 1995) is an American professional soccer player who plays as a midfielder for Calgary Wild FC of the Northern Super League (NSL). She previously played for Angel City FC, San Diego Wave FC, Orlando Pride, and Washington Spirit in the National Women's Soccer League (NWSL).

== Early life ==
Raised in Largo, Florida, Dougherty Howard attended St. Petersburg Catholic High School where she played soccer as a freshman and senior. As a senior, she captained the team to the Florida High School Athletic Association Class 2A regional final and was named to the All-Pinellas County first team by the Tampa Bay Times.

As a youth, Dougherty Howard initially played for a boys teams at Strictly Soccer won the Disney Showcase and President’s Day titles in 2010. She played club soccer with Tampa Bay United Premier Girls 94 team, which won the 2011 and 2012 Disney Qualifier. In 2011, she attended the U.S. under-15 national team camp.

== College career ==
Dougherty Howard was a four-year starter for the Florida Gators at the University of Florida from 2013 to 2016 while also earning a degree in management. She totaled 89 career starts in 94 appearances and scored 14 goals, playing mostly as a holding midfielder. In 2016, Dougherty Howard saw a career high in minutes, goals and assists as a senior and was recognized with All-SEC first team and All-American third team selections, and was named SEC Tournament MVP after registering an assist in each tournament match including on the match-winning golden goal in the final.

In 2015 and 2016, while still in college, Dougherty Howard played for Washington Spirit Reserves in the W-League and in the Women's Premier Soccer League. Her team won the W-League title in 2015 and the Women's Premier Soccer League East Conference in 2016. In 2015, she was named to the W-League All-League Team.

== Club career ==
=== Washington Spirit (2017–2020) ===
In 2017, Dougherty Howard was selected in the third round (29th overall) of the 2017 NWSL College Draft by Washington Spirit. She was signed to the team on March 12 and made her professional debut on April 22 as a 67th minute substitute for Kristie Mewis in a 1–1 draw with Orlando Pride. She scored her first goal as a rookie on August 4, 2017, in a 4–1 victory over Sky Blue FC. Following the 2017 season, she was one of three finalists for NWSL Rookie of the Year.

=== Orlando Pride (2021–2022) ===
On December 24, 2020, Dougherty Howard was traded along with two first-round picks and $140,000 in allocation money to Orlando Pride in exchange for Emily Sonnett. She made her debut for the club on April 10, 2021, starting and assisting both goals in a 2–2 draw with Racing Louisville in the 2021 NWSL Challenge Cup opening round.

=== San Diego Wave FC (2023) ===
On January 12, 2023, Dougherty Howard signed a two-year contract as a free agent with San Diego Wave FC. During the 2023 season, she made 12 appearances for the club, including 8 starts. San Diego finished first in the regular season winning the NWSL Shield. They were defeated by OL Reign in the semi-finals of the NWSL Playoffs.

=== Angel City FC (2024) ===
In January 2024, Dougherty Howard was acquired by Angel City FC in exchange for $40,000 in allocation money ahead of the 2024 season. She made her debut for Angel City on March 17, 2024 in a match against Bay FC. Dougherty Howard recorded her first assist for Angel City on August 24, 2024, in an away match against her former club San Diego Wave FC to help secure a 2–1 victory. Dougherty Howard scored her first goal for Angel City on September 14, 2024, Angel City's only goal in a 2–1 away loss to Racing Louisville FC. At the conclusion of the season, Dougherty Howard became a free agent, and on December 10, 2024, Angel City announced that they would not be signing a new contract with Dougherty Howard.

=== Calgary Wild FC (2025) ===
In February 2025, Dougherty Howard was signed to the Calgary Wild FC in the Northern Super League for the inaugural season. On April 16, 2025, Dougherty Howard started in the club's first ever match and the league's inaugural game, a 1-0 loss to Vancouver Rise FC. Dougherty Howard scored her first goal with the club in the sixth minute of a 4-1 victory over Halifax Tides FC on April 26, 2025. She made her first assist with the Wild in the following game on May 1, 2025, in a 2-1 loss to AFC Toronto. On August 21, 2025, it was announced that she had signed a contract extension with the Wild to keep her with the team through the 2028 season, with Dougherty Howard saying that "From the get-go, the Club recognized the experience and leadership skills that I am able to bring to this relatively young team. I didn’t know I was going to be Captain, but I was very honoured to be trusted with that title. It is a position I take a lot of pride in". At the end of the 2025 season, she was named to the league's Team of the Season.

== International career ==
In November 2011, Dougherty Howard was called up to the United States under-15 team. In April 2016 she was called up to the under-23 training camp in Charlottesville, Virginia that featured only collegiate players. The following month she was part of the 20-player roster that won the U23 Nordic Tournament. In January 2017 Dougherty Howard was again called up to the under-23 team, the first camp of the year that included a mixture of top players from the U.S. youth teams, elite college players and four NWSL players. It was overseen by senior team head coach Jill Ellis to evaluate players for potential senior call-ups.

== Career statistics ==
As of match played October 28, 2026.

Club	Season	League			Playoffs		Cup (Note: Includes the NWSL Challenge Cup)		Other		Total	
Club	Season	Division	Apps	Goals	Apps	Goals	Apps	Goals	Apps	Goals	Apps	Goals
Washington Spirit	2017	NWSL	23	1	—		—		—		23	1
Washington Spirit	2018	NWSL	23	0	—		—		—		23	0
Washington Spirit	2019	NWSL	22	0	—		—		—		22	0
Washington Spirit	2020	NWSL	—		—		3	0	4 (Note: Includes the NWSL Fall Series)	0	7	0
Washington Spirit	Total		68	1	0	0	3	0	4	0	75	1
Orlando Pride	2021	NWSL	21	0	—		3	0	—		24	0
Orlando Pride	2022	NWSL	15	3	—		5	0	—		20	3
Orlando Pride	Total		36	3	0	0	8	0	0	0	44	3
San Diego Wave FC	2023	NWSL	12	0	0	0	5	0	—		17	0
Angel City FC	2024	NWSL	18	1	—		4	0	—		22	1
Calgary Wild	2025	Northern Super League	25	6	—		—		—		25	6
Calgary Wild	2026	Northern Super League	16	4	0	0	0	0	—		16	4
Calgary Wild	Total		41	10	0	0	0	0	0	0	41	10
Career total			175	15	0	0	20	0	4	0	199	15

== Honors ==
Florida Gators

- Southeastern Conference regular season: 2013, 2015
- SEC Women's Soccer Tournament: 2015, 2016

San Diego Wave

- NWSL Shield: 2023

Individual

- USL W-League All-League team: 2015
