= Allie Hess =

American soccer player (born 1996)

Personal information
- Full name: Alexandria Loy Hess
- Date of birth: July 19, 1996 (age 30)
- Place of birth: Kearney, Missouri, United States
- Height: 5 ft 11 in (1.80 m)
- Position: Forward

Team information
- Current team: Calgary Wild FC
- Number: 3

College career
Years	Team	Apps	(Gls)
2014–2017	Missouri Tigers	64	(8)

Senior career*
Years	Team	Apps	(Gls)
2021	Kansas City	1	(0)
2021–2024	MSV Duisburg	53	(8)
2025–2026	Montreal Roses FC	23	(2)
2026–	Calgary Wild FC	0	(0)
- * Club domestic league appearances and goals as of October 20, 2025

Alexandria Loy Hess (born July 19, 1996) is an American professional soccer player who plays as a forward for Canadian club Calgary Wild FC in the Northern Super League.

== College career ==
Hess played for Missouri Tigers women's soccer team from 2014 to 2017.

== Club career ==
In 2020-2021 Hess was a member of the inaugural Kansas City Current team in the NWSL.

In October 2021, Hess signed for MSV Duisburg. She was club captain during the 2023–24 season.

On January 22, 2025, it was announced that Hess had signed for Montreal Roses FC, having scored 10 times and made 4 assists during her total of 53 appearances with Duisburg. In her time with the Roses during the 2025 season she made a total of 23 appearances, scoring twice and making two assists.

On February 13, 2026, it was announced that Hess' contract with Montreal Roses FC had been mutually terminated, and that she had signed for fellow Northern Super League side Calgary Wild FC, with head coach Lydia Bedford saying of her "Allie is a great addition to Wild FC, her ability to play two ways, with quick decision making and willingness to put in the work".
