= Grace Stordy =

Canadian soccer player (born 2002)

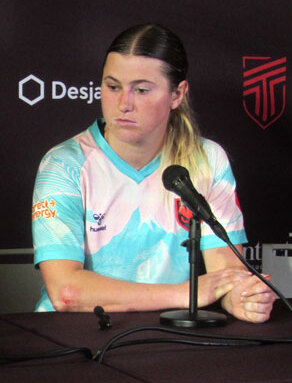
- Stordy in 2025

Personal information
- Full name: Grace Nicole Stordy
- Date of birth: January 21, 2002 (age 24)
- Place of birth: Calgary, Alberta, Canada
- Height: 5 ft 7 in (1.70 m)
- Position: Defender

Team information
- Current team: Calgary Wild FC
- Number: 2

Youth career
- Willow Ridge CA
- Calgary Foothills WFC

College career
Years	Team	Apps	(Gls)
2020–2023	Memphis Tigers	72	(8)

Senior career*
Years	Team	Apps	(Gls)
2018–2019	Calgary Foothills WFC	17	(1)
2023	Calgary Foothills WFC	6	(0)
2024	Braga	1	(0)
2024	Calgary Foothills WFC	3	(2)
2025–	Calgary Wild FC	48	(1)
- * Club domestic league appearances and goals as of October 28, 2026 ‡ National team caps and goals as of September 3, 2024

Grace Nicole Stordy (born January 21, 2002) is a Canadian soccer player who plays for Calgary Wild FC in the Northern Super League.

== Early life ==
Stordy began playing youth soccer with the Willow Ridge Community Association, followed by the Calgary Foothills WFC.

== College career ==
In 2020, Stordy began attending the University of Memphis, where she played for the women's soccer team. On February 4, 2021, she scored her first career goal of the season opener against the UAB Blazers (the season was delayed from the fall due to the COVID-19 pandemic. She won weekly Honour Roll honours in February 2021 and was named the AAC Women’s Soccer Rookie of the Week in March. At the end of her freshman season, she was named the AAC Rookie of the Year and was named to the All-AAC First Team and the AAC All-Rookie Team.

Ahead of her sophomore season, she was named to the Preseason All-Conference Team. In October 2021, she was named the AAC Offensive Player of the Week. At the end of the season, she was again named to the All-AAC First Team and was named to the AAC All-Academic Team.

Ahead of her junior season, she was again named to the Preseason All-Conference Team. At the end of the season, she was named to the All-AAC First Team, the AAC Championship All-Tournament Team, the All-South Region Second Team, and the AAC All-Academic Team.

Ahead of her senior season, she was again named to the Preseason All-Conference Team and was also named the United Soccer Coaches Defensive Player to Watch. In October, she was named to the AAC's Weekly Honour Roll. At the end of the season, she was named to the All-AAC First Team for the fourth time.

== Club career ==
In 2018, she began playing with Calgary Foothills WFC in the semi-pro United Women's Soccer. She made her debut on May 25, 2018, scoring in her first career match against Real Salt Lake Women on an end-to-end goal. In 2018, she was named to the All-UWS Second Team, and in 2019, she was named to the All-UWS Third Team.

In 2023, she returned to the Calgary Foothills. In June 2023, she was named the CTV News Calgary Athlete of the Week. At the end of the season, she was named the 2023 West Conference Defensive Player of the Year, West Conference MVP, and named to the All-UWS First Team.

After not being selected in 2024 NWSL Draft, she signed with Portuguese Campeonato Nacional Feminino club Braga in February 2024.

She then subsequently returned to the Calgary Foothills for the 2024 season.

In November 2025, she signed with Northern Super League club Calgary Wild FC for the 2025 season. On April 16, 2025, she started in the league's inaugural game, a 1-0 loss to Vancouver Rise FC. On October 11, 2025, she scored her first professional goal in a 3-1 victory over Halifax Tides FC. On January 26, 2026, it was announced that she had signed a contract extension to keep her with the Wild for a further two seasons.

== International career ==
In 2017, she made her debut in the Canadian national program, attending camps with the Canada U15 and U17 national teams. In 2022, she attended camps with the Canada U20.

== Career statistics ==
As of October 28, 2026

Club	Season	League			Playoffs		Domestic Cup		Other		Total	
Club	Season	Division	Apps	Goals	Apps	Goals	Apps	Goals	Apps	Goals	Apps	Goals
Calgary Foothills WFC	2018	UWS	10	1	1	0	—		—		11	1
Calgary Foothills WFC	2019	UWS	7	0	2	0	—		—		9	0
Calgary Foothills WFC	2023	UWS	6	0	—		—		—		6	0
Calgary Foothills WFC	Total		23	1	3	0	0	0	0	0	26	1
Braga	2023–24	Campeonato Nacional Feminino	1	0	—		2	0	—		3	0
Calgary Foothills WFC	2024	UWS	3	2	—		—		—		3	2
Calgary Wild FC	2025	Northern Super League	25	1	—		—		—		25	1
Calgary Wild FC	2026	Northern Super League	23	0	0	0	1	0	—		24	0
Calgary Wild FC	Total		48	1	0	0	1	0	0	0	49	1
Career total			75	4	3	0	3	0	0	0	81	4
