= Taylor Otto =

American soccer player (born 1999)

- Otto in 2026

Personal information
- Full name: Taylor Marie Otto
- Date of birth: October 23, 1999 (age 27)
- Place of birth: Cleveland, Ohio, United States
- Height: 5 ft 10 in (1.78 m)
- Position: Midfielder

Team information
- Current team: Calgary Wild
- Number: 23

Youth career
- CASL ECNL

College career
Years	Team	Apps	(Gls)
2016–2020	North Carolina Tar Heels	84	(11)

Senior career*
Years	Team	Apps	(Gls)
2021–2022	Racing Louisville FC	11	(0)
2022–2023	Celtic	27	(2)
2023	Gotham FC	0	(0)
2023–2026	Melbourne City	50	(6)
2026–	Calgary Wild	13	(1)

International career
2016	United States U20	6	(0)
2019	United States U23	3	(0)
- * Club domestic league appearances and goals as of October 28, 2026

Taylor Marie Otto (born October 23, 1999) is an American professional soccer player who last plays as a midfielder for Northern Super League club Calgary Wild.

== College career ==
Born in Cleveland, Ohio, Otto began her career with CASL ECNL before joining the North Carolina Tar Heels of the University of North Carolina at Chapel Hill. She red shirted her first season with the Tar Heels after she participated with the United States under-20 side at the FIFA U-20 Women's World Cup. The next season, in 2017, she became the starting center-back for the Tar Heels, playing all 22 games for the side. After spending four seasons with the Tar Heels, Otto had played 84 matches, scoring 11 goals.

== Club career ==
On January 13, 2021, Otto was selected first pick of the second round (11th overall) of the NWSL Draft by Racing Louisville. She made her debut for the side on April 15, 2021, in the NWSL Challenge Cup against the Washington Spirit, coming on as a 78th-minute substitute in a 1–0 defeat. On July 27, 2022, Racing Louisville announced that Otto had mutually terminated her contract with the club to pursue playing opportunities in Europe.

On August 7, 2022, Otto signed for Celtic, and she made her Celtic debut in a 9–0 win against Hibernian.

In July 2023, Otto joined Gotham FC as a national team replacement player, due to six players of the club being selected to play in the 2023 FIFA Women's World Cup.

In September 2023, Otto joined Australian club Melbourne City on a one-year deal. She impressed after starting every game of the 2023/24 campaign and re-signed for another year on June 14, 2024. She was an important member of head coach Dario Vidošić's inaugural AFC Women's Champions League squad.

In July 2026, Otto departed Melbourne City at the conclusion of her contract to pursue an opportunity overseas. A few days later, Canadian Northern Super League club Calgary Wild announced signing Otto.

== Career statistics ==
=== Club ===
As of match played October 28, 2026

Appearances and goals by club, season and competition
Club	Season	League			Cup		Continental		Total	
Club	Season	Division	Apps	Goals	Apps	Goals	Apps	Goals	Apps	Goals
Racing Louisville	2021	National Women's Soccer League	9	0	3	0	—	—	12	0
Racing Louisville	2022	National Women's Soccer League	2	0	3	0	—	—	5	0
Calgary Wild FC	2026	Northern Super League	13	1	1	1	0	0	14	2
Career total			24	1	7	1	0	0	31	2
