= Hannah Boughton =

American soccer player (born 2003)

Personal information
- Full name: Hannah Simiko Boughton
- Date of birth: December 15, 2003 (age 22)
- Place of birth: Colleyville, Texas, United States
- Height: 5 ft 5 in (1.65 m)
- Positions: Midfielder; full-back

Team information
- Current team: Calgary Wild FC
- Number: 22

Youth career
- Dallas Texans SC

College career
Years	Team	Apps	(Gls)
2022	Missouri Tigers	17	(1)
2023–2024	Baylor Bears	38	(0)
2025	UCF Knights	21	(1)

Senior career*
Years	Team	Apps	(Gls)
2024–2025	FC Olympia	13	(4)
2026	Minnesota Aurora FC	10	(1)
2026–	Calgary Wild FC	14	(0)
- * Club domestic league appearances and goals as of October 28, 2026

Hannah Simiko Boughton (born December 15, 2003) is an American soccer player who plays as a midfielder for Northern Super League club Calgary Wild FC.

== Early life ==
Boughton played youth soccer with Dallas Texans SC.

== College career ==
In 2022, Boughton began attending the University of Missouri, where she played for the women's soccer team. Ahead of the season, she was named to the SEC Preseason Watchlist. On August 18, she made her collegiate debut in a match against the Southeast Missouri State Redhawks. On August 25, she scored her first goal in a 3-1 victory over the Southern Illinois Salukis.

In 2023, she transferred to Baylor University, joining their women's soccer team. In 2024, she earned Academic All-Big 12 honors.

In 2025, she moved to the University of Central Florida for her senior season, playing their women's soccer team. She began the season as a midfielder, before playing the final 12 matches of the season as a defender, due to injuries on the team. On November 14, she scored her first goal in a 2-0 victory over the Maine Black Bears women's soccer, in the first round of the NCAA Tournament. She earned Academic All-District and Academic All-Big 12 honors.

== Club career ==
In 2024 and 2025, Boughton played with FC Olympia in the USL W League.

In April 2026, Boughton signed with Minnesota Aurora FC in the USL W League.

In July 2026, she signed a professional contract with Calgary Wild FC in the Northern Super League. She made her debut on July 22, starting the match against Ottawa Rapid FC.

== Career statistics ==
As of October 28, 2026

Appearances and goals by club, season and competition
Club	Season	League			Playoffs		National cup		League cup		Total	
Club	Season	Division	Apps	Goals	Apps	Goals	Apps	Goals	Apps	Goals	Apps	Goals
FC Olympia	2024	USL W League	9	4	2	0	—		—		11	4
FC Olympia	2025	USL W League	4	0	0	0	—		—		3	0
FC Olympia	Total		13	4	2	0	0	0	0	0	15	4
Minnesota Aurora FC	2026	USL W League	10	1	3	0	—		—		13	0
Calgary Wild FC	2026	Northern Super League	14	0	0	0	1	0	0	0	15	0
Career total			37	5	5	0	1	0	0	0	43	5
