= Serita Thurton =

Canadian soccer player (born 2002)

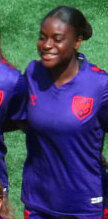
- Thurton in 2025

Personal information
- Full name: Serita Joy Metha Thurton
- Date of birth: January 16, 2002 (age 24)
- Place of birth: Toronto, Ontario, Canada
- Height: 5 ft 5 in (1.65 m)
- Position: Forward

Team information
- Current team: Calgary Wild FC
- Number: 18

Youth career
- Ajax SC
- FC Durham
- Ontario REX

College career
Years	Team	Apps	(Gls)
2020–2024	South Florida Bulls	85	(4)

Senior career*
Years	Team	Apps	(Gls)
2022	Electric City FC	1	(0)
2023	North Toronto Nitros	10	(5)
2024	FC Olympia	7	(2)
2025–	Calgary Wild FC	45	(4)

International career^{‡}
2018	Canada U17	6	(4)
2022	Canada U20	9	(2)
- * Club domestic league appearances and goals as of October 28, 2026 ‡ National team caps and goals as of April 17, 2025

Serita Joy Metha Thurton (born January 16, 2002) is a Canadian soccer player who plays for Calgary Wild FC in the Northern Super League.

== Early life ==
Born in Toronto, Thurton moved to nearby Ajax, Ontario at age two, where she began playing youth soccer at age four with Ajax SC. She later played with FC Durham and the Ontario REX program.

== College career ==
In November 2019, Thurton committed to attend the University of South Florida to play for the women's soccer team beginning in the fall of 2020 (the 2020 season was eventually delayed to the spring of 2021 due to the COVID-19 pandemic). On March 28, 2021, she scored her first career goal in a 3–1 victory over the Houston Cougars. In October 2022, she was named to the Atlantic Coast Conference Honor Roll. Ahead of the 2023 and 2024 seasons, Thurton was named to the ACC Watch List. At the end of the 2024 season, she was named to the Academic All-District Team.

== Club career ==
In 2022, Thurton played with Electric City FC in League1 Ontario. In 2023, Thurton played with the North Toronto Nitros in League1 Ontario.

In 2024, she played with FC Olympia in the USL W League.

In April 2025, Thurton signed with Calgary Wild FC of the Northern Super League, ahead of the inaugural season. She debuted in the league's inaugural match on April 16, 2025, in a 1–0 loss to Vancouver Rise FC, coming on as a substitute. On July 12, 2025, she scored her first goal in a 2–1 victory over Vancouver Rise FC. Having scored once and produced two assists across 1,741 minutes of play during the 2025 season, on January 20, 2026, it was announced that she had signed a contract extension to keep her with the Wild through 2027.

== International career ==
In February 2017, Thurton debuted in the Canadian national program, at age 15, attending an identification camp with the Canada U17 team. She was later named to the roster for the 2018 CONCACAF Women's U-17 Championship, winning bronze, and the 2018 FIFA U-17 Women's World Cup, finishing in fourth.

In 2022, Thurton was named to the Canada U20 team for the 2022 CONCACAF Women's U-20 Championship, winning bronze, as well as being named to the squad for the 2022 FIFA U-20 Women's World Cup.

== Career statistics ==
As of October 28, 2026

Club	Season	League			Playoffs		Domestic Cup		Other		Total	
Club	Season	Division	Apps	Goals	Apps	Goals	Apps	Goals	Apps	Goals	Apps	Goals
Electric City FC	2022	League1 Ontario	1	0	—		—		—		1	0
North Toronto Nitros	2023	League1 Ontario	10	5	0	0	—		—		10	5
FC Olympia	2024	USL W League	7	2	0	0	—		—		7	2
Calgary Wild FC	2025	Northern Super League	23	1	—		—		—		23	1
Calgary Wild FC	2026	Northern Super League	22	3	0	0	1	1	0	0	23	4
Calgary Wild FC	Total		45	4	0	0	1	1	0	0	46	5
Career total			63	11	0	0	1	1	0	0	64	12
