= Molly Race =

Canadian soccer player (born 2002)

Personal information
- Full name: Molly Elly Isabel Race
- Date of birth: October 26, 2002 (age 24)
- Place of birth: Vernon, British Columbia, Canada
- Height: 1.70 m (5 ft 7 in)
- Position: Goalkeeper

Youth career
- Thompson Okanagan FC

College career
Years	Team	Apps	(Gls)
2021–2022	UBC Okanagan Heat	26	(0)

Senior career*
Years	Team	Apps	(Gls)
2023–2025	FC Nordsjælland	15	(0)
2026	Calgary Wild FC	2	(0)
- * Club domestic league appearances and goals as of July 1, 2026

Molly Elly Isabel Race (born October 26, 2002) is a Canadian soccer player.

== Early life ==
Race played youth soccer with Thompson Okanagan FC.

== College career ==
In 2020, Race began attending the University of British Columbia Okanagan, where she played for the women's soccer team. Her initial season in 2020 was cancelled due to the COVID-19 pandemic, instead she debuted in 2021. In 2022, she earned Academic All-Canadian honours and won the team's Community Service & Leadership Award.

== Club career ==
In August 2023, Race signed with FC Nordsjælland in the Danish A-Liga. She won the league title in 2023–24 with the team and was named the team's MVP that season. In November 2024, she signed an extension with the club.

In February 2026, Race returned to Canada, signing with Calgary Wild FC in the Northern Super League.
