= Frédérique St-Jean =

Canadian soccer player (born 2000)

Personal information
- Date of birth: June 6, 2000 (age 26)
- Place of birth: Montréal, Québec, Canada
- Height: 5 ft 10 in (1.78 m)
- Position: Defender

Team information
- Current team: Calgary Wild FC
- Number: 12

College career
Years	Team	Apps	(Gls)
2020–2023	St. John's Red Storm	63	(6)
2024–2025	Buffalo Bulls	35	(2)

Senior career*
Years	Team	Apps	(Gls)
2018–2019	CS Monteuil	26	(1)
2021–2022	AS Laval (Note: CS Monteuil changed its name to AS Laval in 2022)	17	(0)
2025	CS Longueuil	5	(0)
2026	FC Laval	5	(1)
2026–	Calgary Wild FC	11	(1)
- * Club domestic league appearances and goals as of October 28, 2026

Frédérique St-Jean (born June 6, 2000) is a Canadian soccer player who plays for Calgary Wild FC in the Northern Super League.

== College career ==
In 2020, St-Jean began attending St. John's University, where she played for the women's soccer team. On March 4, 2021, she scored her first collegiate goal, scoring the winner in overtime in a 1-0 victory over the Villanova Wildcats. She missed her entire junior season (redshirting it) in 2022 due to injury. In August 2023, she was named to the TopDrawerSoccer National Team of the Week.

After graduating from St. John's, she moved to the University of Buffalo for graduate studies in 2024, joining their women's soccer team. At the end of the 2024 season, she was named to the All-MAC First Team and the All-Midwest Region Second Team. In 2025, she was named to the All-MAC First Team, the All-Midwest Region Fourth Team, Academic All-District Team, and earned Academic All-MAC honours.

== Club career ==
In 2018, she began playing with CS Monteuil in the Première ligue de soccer du Québec.

In July 2026, she signed with Calgary Wild FC in the Northern Super League. She made her debut on July 28 against AFC Toronto.
