= Andersen Williams =

Canadian soccer player (born 2002)

Personal information
- Date of birth: April 2, 2002 (age 24)
- Place of birth: Calgary, Alberta, Canada
- Height: 5 ft 7 in (1.70 m)
- Position: Forward

Team information
- Current team: Calgary Wild FC
- Number: 29

Youth career
- Calgary South West United SC
- 2017–2020: Whitecaps FC Girls Elite

College career
Years	Team	Apps	(Gls)
2020–2024	Texas A&M Aggies	55	(3)

Senior career*
Years	Team	Apps	(Gls)
2023	Calgary Foothills WFC		
2025–	Calgary Wild FC	9	(0)
2026–	→ Calgary Wild FC U23	1	(0)

International career^{‡}
2018	Canada U17	10	(4)
2019	Canada U18		
2020	Canada U20	3	(0)
- * Club domestic league appearances and goals as of October 28, 2026 ‡ National team caps and goals as of March 4, 2020

Andersen Williams (born April 2, 2002) is a Canadian soccer player who plays for Calgary Wild FC in the Northern Super League.

== Early life ==
Williams began playing youth soccer with Calgary South West United SC at age six, also playing with the Whitecaps FC Alberta South Academy Centre, before joining the Whitecaps FC Girls Elite in August 2017. In 2019, she received the Whitecaps Academy Most Promising Female Player award.

== College career ==
In 2020, Williams began attending Texas A&M University, where she played for the women's soccer team. After her second match in her freshman season, she suffered an torn ACL injury which kept her out for the remainder of the season, as well as her entire sophomore season. On September 16, 2022, she scored her first collegiate goal in a 3-2 victory over the Georgia Bulldogs. After returning to play for the 2022 season, she won the school's Aggie Comeback Award, after the season. Ahead of the 2024 season, she was named co-captain of the team. She also earned SEC Fall Academic Honor Roll three times.

== Club career ==
In 2023, Williams played with Calgary Foothills WFC in United Women's Soccer.

In September 2025, Williams signed a professional contract with Calgary Wild FC in the Northern Super League.

== International career ==
Williams debut in the Canada national program in March 2017, attending an identification camp. She played with the Canada U17 team at the 2018 CONCACAF Women's U-17 Championship, where she scored both goals in a 2-1 victory over Costa Rica U17 on June 6, 2018, that qualified the team for the semi-finals. In the third-place match, she scored the winning goal in the 89th minute to defeat Haiti U17 2-1, that qualified the team for the 2018 FIFA U-17 Women's World Cup. In 2019, she played with the Canada U18 team at a friendly tournament in England. She played for the Canada U20 team at the 2020 CONCACAF Women's U-20 Championship.

== Personal life ==
Williams' aunt is former Canada water polo player Cora Campbell and her uncle is former Canadian football player Nigel Williams.
