= Michelle Romero =

Venezuelan footballer (born 1997)

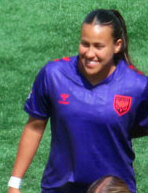
- Romero in 2025

Personal information
- Full name: Michelle Yeraldin Romero Castillo
- Date of birth: 12 June 1997 (age 29)
- Place of birth: Falcón, Venezuela
- Height: 1.70 m (5 ft 7 in)
- Position: Defender

Team information
- Current team: Cruzeiro

Senior career*
Years	Team	Apps	(Gls)
2014	Asozulia FC		
2014–2016	Deportivo Lara		
2017	Zulia		
2017–2021	Deportivo La Coruña	46	(4)
2021–2022	Sporting de Gijón		
2022–2023	Zaragoza CFF		
2023–2025	Real Unión de Tenerife		
2025–2026	Calgary Wild FC	14	(0)
2026	→ Calgary Wild FC U23	1	(2)
2026–	Cruzeiro	5	(0)

International career^{‡}
2012–2014	Venezuela U17	7	(1)
2014–2016	Venezuela U20	3	(1)
2014–	Venezuela	35	(3)
Medal record
Women's football
Representing Venezuela
Central American and Caribbean Games
Silver medal – second place	2023 San Salvador
- * Club domestic league appearances and goals as of 30 July 2026 ‡ National team caps and goals as of 21 November 2016

Michelle Yeraldin Romero Castillo (born 12 June 1997) is a Venezuelan footballer who plays as a defender for Cruzeiro in the Brazilian Série A1 and the Venezuela women's national team.

== Career ==
In late 2014, Romero signed with Deportivo Lara.

In 2017, she played with Zulia.

In 2018, she signed with Deportivo La Coruña.

In August 2021, she signed with Sporting de Gijón.

In October 2022, she signed with Zaragoza CFF.

In August 2025, she signed with Northern Super League club Calgary Wild FC.

On 30 July 2026, Romero was announced at Cruzeiro.

== International career ==
Romero represented Venezuela at the 2014 South American U-20 Women's Championship.

== International goals ==
No.	Date	Venue	Opponent	Score	Result	Competition
1.	8 April 2024	Brígido Iriarte Stadium, Caracas, Venezuela	Panama	1–0	3–0	Friendly
2.	31 May 2025	Marbella Football Center, San Pedro Alcántara, Spain	New Zealand	2–1	3–1	Friendly
3.	3 March 2026	FMF Asociación, Toluca, Mexico	Brazil	1–0	2–1	Friendly
