= Christie Gray =

Canadian soccer player

Personal information
- Date of birth: April 26, 1999 (age 27)
- Place of birth: Vancouver, British Columbia, Canada
- Height: 5 ft 7 in (1.70 m)
- Position: Forward

Youth career
- 2011–2017: Fusion FC

College career
Years	Team	Apps	(Gls)
2017–2021	Queen's Golden Gaels	68	(8)

Senior career*
Years	Team	Apps	(Gls)
2022	Rävåsens IK	19	(4)
2023–2024	Shelbourne	36	(10)
2025	Calgary Wild	21	(0)
2026–	Wexford	0	(0)
- * Club domestic league appearances and goals as of October 17, 2025

Christie Gray (born April 26, 1999) is a Canadian soccer player who plays as a forward for Wexford.

== Early life ==
Gray played youth soccer with Fusion FC.

== University career ==
In 2017, Gray began attending Queen's University, where she played for the women's soccer team. On October 6, 2019, she scored a hat trick in a 5–1 victory over the Ontario Tech Ridgebacks. At the end of the 2019 season, she was named an OUA East First Team All-Star. She scored another hat trick on October 24, 2021, in a victory over the Royal Military College Paladins, which earned her Queen's Athlete of the Week honours. At the end of the 2021 season, she won the OUA East Division Community Service Award, was named an OUA East All-Star, and a U Sports Second Team All-Canadian.

== Club career ==
In January 2020, she trained with French club Bordeaux which on a semester abroad at KEDGE Business School while in university. Bordeaux wanted to sign her to play matches with their second team, however, her international transfer certificate did not arrive in time before she had to return to Canada, due to the COVID-19 pandemic.

In March 2022, Gray signed with Swedish club Rävåsens IK in the second tier Elitettan. She scored her first goal on June 12, 2022, against Lidköping.

In February 2023, she signed with Shelbourne in the League of Ireland Women's Premier Division. She finished as the team's leading scorer in 2023 and finished as league runner-up in both 2023 and 2024 and won the FAI Women's Cup in 2024, after finishing as runner-up in 2023.

In December 2024, she signed with Northern Super League club Calgary Wild ahead of the inaugural 2025 season. On April 16, 2025, she started in the league's inaugural game, a 1-0 loss to Vancouver Rise FC. On December 3, 2025, it was announced that she had been released from the Wild following the conclusion of the 2025 season.

In July 2026, she signed with Wexford in Ireland.
