= Danielle Steer =

Canadian soccer player

Personal information
- Full name: Danielle Alice Steer
- Date of birth: April 29, 1999 (age 27)
- Place of birth: Surrey, British Columbia, Canada
- Height: 5 ft 9 in (1.75 m)
- Position: Forward

Youth career
- Coastal FC

College career
Years	Team	Apps	(Gls)
2017–2022	UBC Thunderbirds	97	(57)

Senior career*
Years	Team	Apps	(Gls)
2022	Varsity FC		(2)
2023	Western United	14	(2)
2023	Nautsa’mawt FC	10	(0)
2023–2024	Fenerbahçe	7	(1)
2024	Treaty United	11	(8)
2025	Calgary Wild FC	16	(1)
- * Club domestic league appearances and goals as of October 17, 2025

Danielle Alice Steer (born April 29, 1999) is a Canadian soccer player.

== Early life ==
Steer played youth soccer with Coastal FC. She also played for the British Columbia provincial team.

== University career ==
In 2017, Steer began attending the University of British Columbia, where she played for the women's soccer team. On September 9, 2017, she scored her first goals, scoring twice against the UFV Cascades in a 3–0 victory. In 2019, she won the U Sports women's soccer championship and was named the championship MVP. On October 8, 2021, she scored her first hat trick in a 3–0 victory over the UBC Okanagan Heat. In 2021, she set the Canada West Conference single season goals record with 18. In 2022, she set the all-time Canada West career points record in women's soccer, passing the former record of 65 points set by Jasmin Dhanda. In 2022, she helped UBC capture their first Canada West title since 2016. In 2022, she was named the Canada West Player of the Year. She scored in her final match for UBC as UBC defeated the Trinity Western Spartans 1–0 in the consolation final of the national tournament. She finished her career with 57 goals and 28 assists in 97 games (including 46 goals and 25 assists for the record 71 total points in Canada West competition). She was named to the 2017 Canada West All-Rookie team, was a three-time Canada West First Team All-Star in 2018, 2021, and 2022, and a 2018 U Sports Second Team All-Canadian and 2022 U Sports First Team All-Canadian.

== Club career ==
In 2022, she played with Varsity FC in League1 British Columbia. On June 7, 2022, she scored two goals in a 3–0 victory over Altitude FC.

In January 2023, she signed her first professional contract with Australian A-League Women club Western United. She made her debut on January 11 against Sydney FC. She scored her first goal on January 28 against Canberra United FC.

In May 2023, after the end of the Australian season, she returned to League1 British Columbia, joining her former team, who re-branded to Nautsa’mawt FC (previously Varsity FC).

In September 2023, she signed with Turkish Women's Football Super League club Fenerbahçe. On December 10, 2023, she scored the only goal in a 1-0 victory over Trabzonspor. On January 17, 2024, she terminated her contract with the club by mutual consent.

In July 2024, Steer signed with Treaty United in the League of Ireland Women's Premier Division.

In March 2025, she signed with Northern Super League club Calgary Wild FC. On April 16, 2025, she came on as a substitute in the league's inaugural game, a 1-0 defeat to Vancouver Rise FC. She scored her first goal on June 14, 2025 against AFC Toronto. After the 2025 season, the Wild announced that Steer had been released.

== Personal ==
Steer's mother is the niece of Australian swimmer and four-time Olympic gold medalist Dawn Fraser.
