= Kathryn Harvey (soccer) =

Canadian soccer player (born 1997)

- Harvey in 2025

Personal information
- Full name: Kathryn Elizabeth Harvey
- Date of birth: June 9, 1997 (age 29)
- Place of birth: Coquitlam, British Columbia, Canada
- Height: 1.70 m (5 ft 7 in)
- Position: Forward

Youth career
- New West SC

College career
Years	Team	Apps	(Gls)
2017–2021	Trinity Western Spartans	75	(31)

Senior career*
Years	Team	Apps	(Gls)
2022	Unity FC		
2022–2024	AaB	45	(23)
2024	Fatih Vatan S.K.	5	(1)
2024–2025	Melbourne City FC	15	(3)
2025	Unity FC	2	(0)
2025–2026	Calgary Wild FC	17	(1)
- * Club domestic league appearances and goals as of July 20, 2026

Kathryn Elizabeth Harvey (born June 9, 1997) is a Canadian soccer player.

== Early life ==
Harvey played youth soccer with New West SC. Harvey attended Dr. Charles Best Secondary School, where she was a four-year starter on the lacrosse and volleyball teams, and also helped the soccer team to the AAA provincial soccer championship in 2015. She also played lacrosse with the British Columbia provincial team, winning the Junior Women's Box Lacrosse National Title in 2015.

== University career ==
In September 2015, Harvey began attending LIU Brooklyn when she played for the women's lacrosse team on a full lacrosse scholarship. In March 2016, she was named the Northeast Conference Lacrosse Rookie of the Month.

In 2017, she transferred to Trinity Western University choosing to switch to soccer and join the women's soccer team. She made her debut on September 8, 2017, against the UBC Thunderbirds. She scored her first goal on September 24, 2017, in a 1–0 victory over the MacEwan Griffins. At the end of the 2017 season, she was named to the Canada West All-Rookie Team. In 2019, she was named to the All-Canada West Second Team and an Academic All-Canadian. In November 2021, Harvey was named the Canada West Athlete of the Week and at the end of the season, she was again named to the All-Canada West Second Team and an Academic All-Canadian.

== Club career ==
In 2022, she played with Unity FC in League1 British Columbia.

In August 2022, she signed her first professional contract with Danish club AaB in the second tier Kvinde 1. division. In August 2023, she extended her contract for another season after helping the club earn promotion to the first tier Kvindeligaen in her debut season.

In July 2024, she signed with Fatih Vatan S.K. of the Turkish Women's Football Super League. In October 2024, she departed the club.

On October 29, 2024, she signed with Australian club Melbourne City in the A-League Women. On November 3, 2024, she scored two goals in her club debut, after coming on as a substitute, in a 5–2 victory in the opening match of the season against Perth Glory. In June 2025, it was announced she had left the club at the end of her contract.

In July 2025, she briefly returned to Unity FC in League1 British Columbia.

In late July 2025, she signed with Calgary Wild FC of the Northern Super League. On July 27, 2025, she made her debut in a match against Montreal Roses FC. On August 16, 2025, she scored her first goal in a 1-0 victory over Halifax Tides FC. In July 2026, she departed the club.
