= Mijke Roelfsema =

Dutch footballer

Personal information
- Date of birth: 11 March 1998 (age 28)
- Place of birth: The Hague, Netherlands
- Height: 5 ft 8 in (1.73 m)
- Position: Defender

Team information
- Current team: Rangers
- Number: 11

Youth career
- 2008–2014: VV Schoonhoven
- 2014–2015: ADO Den Haag

College career
| Years | Team | Apps | (Gls) |
| 2017–2018 | Boston College Eagles | 36 | (1) |
| 2019–2021 | Rice Owls | 49 | (3) |

Senior career*
| Years | Team | Apps | (Gls) |
| 2015–2017 | ADO Den Haag | 34 | (2) |
| 2021 | Calgary Foothills WFC | | |
| 2022–2023 | Apollon Ladies | 11 | (1) |
| 2023–2024 | Aalborg BK | 14 | (0) |
| 2024 | Treaty United | 9 | (0) |
| 2025 | Calgary Wild | 18 | (0) |
| 2026 | Nantes | 0 | (0) |
| 2026– | Rangers | 0 | (0) |

International career^{‡}
| 2015 | Netherlands U17 | 1 | (0) |
| 2017 | Netherlands U19 | 2 | (0) |
- * Club domestic league appearances and goals as of 15:01, 31 July 2026 (UTC) ‡ National team caps and goals as of 3 March 2017

Mijke Roelfsema (born 11 March 1998) is a Dutch professional footballer who plays as a defender for Scottish Women's Premier League side Rangers.

== Early life ==
Roelfsema played youth football with VV Schoonhoven, where she played with the boys teams. In August 2014, she joined ADO Den Haag.

== College career ==
In 2017, Roelfsema moved to the United States to attend Boston College, where she played for the women's soccer team. She was offered a full scholarship to attend the program. In 2017, she earned the Athletic Director's Award for Academic Achievement and was named to the ACC Honor Roll. She scored her first collegiate goal on 6 September 2018, against the Boston University Terriers.

In 2019, she transferred to Rice University to play for the women's soccer. In October 2019, she was named the Conference USA Co-Defender of the Week. At the end of the 2019 season, she was named to the All-Conference USA Second Team and the All-South Region Second Team. Ahead of her second season with Rice (and fourth at the collegiate level), she was named to the Conference USA All-Preseason Team. She scored her first goal for Rice on 7 March 2021 against the North Texas Mean Green. In March 2021, she was named the Conference USA Defensive Player of the Week. At the end of the season, she was named a First Team All-American and was a semi-finalist for the MAC Hermann Trophy. She was also named the Conference USA Defender of the Year, and named to the All-South Region First Team, a First-Team Scholar All-American, Conference USA Academic Medalist, Conference USA Academic Honor Roll, Conference USA All-Academic Second Team, and a Rice Scholar Athlete. Ahead of the 2021 Fall season, she was named a Preseason First Team All-American, Conference USA Preseason Team and the Conference USA Preseason Defender of the Year. After a strong start to her final season, she suffered a season-ending injury halfway through the season. At the end of the season, she was named to the Conference USA All-Academic Second Team and was nominated for the Senior CLASS Award.

== Club career ==
In 2014, she began training with the ADO Den Haag first team while a member of the youth program, making her debut in 2015.

During her time at college, she also briefly played with Calgary Foothills WFC in United Women's Soccer.

In the summer of 2022, Roelfsema signed with Cypriot First Division club Apollon Ladies.

In August 2023, she signed with Danish Women's League club AaB Fodbold.

In July 2024, she signed with League of Ireland Women's Premier Division club Treaty United. In November 2024, she departed the club.

In December 2024, she signed with Canadian Northern Super League club Calgary Wild. On 16 April 2025, she started in the league's inaugural game, a 1–0 defeat to Vancouver Rise FC.

On 21 January 2026, Roelfsema was announced at FC Nantes on a six-month contract, with the option of an additional year. At the end of June 2026, she departed the club, upon the expiry of her contract expired.

In July 2026, Roelfsema joined Scottish Women's Premier League club Rangers on a two-year contract.

== International career ==
In March 2015, Roelfsema was called up to the Netherlands U17 team for a training camp and played her first match against Germany U17 in a friendly, before being called up for Euro U17 qualifying matches the following month.
