= Meikayla Moore =

New Zealand footballer (born 1996)

Meikayla Moore OLY
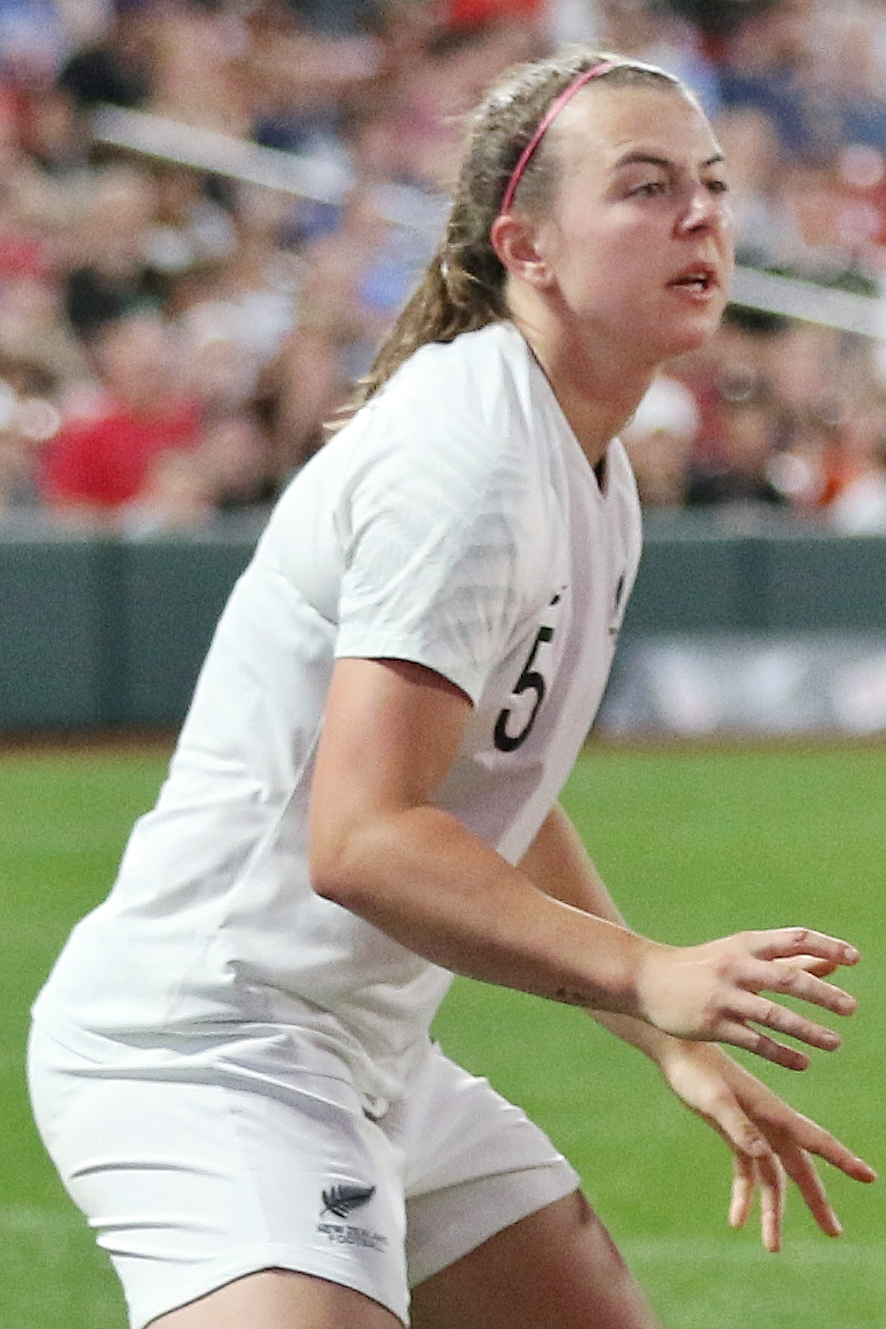
- Moore in 2019

Personal information
- Full name: Meikayla Jean-Maree Moore
- Date of birth: 4 June 1996 (age 30)
- Place of birth: Christchurch, New Zealand
- Height: 1.73 m (5 ft 8 in)
- Position: Defender

Team information
- Current team: Calgary Wild
- Number: 5

Youth career
- Burwood AFC
- Avon United
- Coastal Spirit

Senior career*
Years	Team	Apps	(Gls)
2017–2018	FC Köln	8	(0)
2018–2020	Duisburg	31	(1)
2020–2022	Liverpool	24	(2)
2022–2024	Glasgow City	38	(4)
2025–	Calgary Wild	45	(3)

International career^{‡}
2012	New Zealand U17	10	(0)
2012–2016	New Zealand U20	9	(0)
2013–	New Zealand	77	(4)
- * Club domestic league appearances and goals as of October 28, 2026 ‡ National team caps and goals as of 23 May 2026.

Meikayla Jean-Maree Moore (born 4 June 1996) is a New Zealand professional footballer who plays as a defender for Canadian club Calgary Wild and the New Zealand national team.

== Club career ==
After playing for various clubs in New Zealand, Moore was signed by Bundesliga newcomers 1. FC Köln in 2018, for whom she played eight league games in the second half of the season. After the club was relegated as second-to-last at the end of the season, she moved to league rivals MSV Duisburg. In Duisburg, she made 20 league appearances.

On 4 November 2018, she scored her first Bundesliga goal in a 2–1 defeat to champions VfL Wolfsburg. Duisburg finished the season in ninth place. Due to injury, she was unable to play in the first half of the 2019/20 season. She only got fit again at the start of the second half of the season. At the end of August 2020, she moved to English second division club Liverpool. After two seasons, she moved north to Glasgow City.

On 6 November 2024, Moore signed with Canadian club Calgary Wild FC for the inaugural Northern Super League season. On April 26, 2025, she scored the first goal in franchise history, in a 4-1 victory over the Halifax Tides. On January 28, 2026, it was announced that she had signed a contract extension to keep her with the Wild through 2027.

== International career ==
=== Youth ===
Moore was a member of the New Zealand U-17 side at the 2012 U-17 World Cup, playing in all three of New Zealand's group games.

In February 2014, she took part in the U-20 Oceania Championship in her home country. Moore played in two games and wore the captain's armband. With three victories, New Zealand won this championship. This qualified them for the 2014 U-20 World Cup in Canada, where Moore played in all of her team's matches. New Zealand finished second in the group stage behind European champions France, making it to the quarter-finals of a World Cup for the first time. However, they were eliminated by eventual runners-up Nigeria.

=== Senior ===
Moore made her senior debut for the Football Ferns as a substitute in the 4–0 win over China on 26 September 2013 in the Valais Cup final.

In March 2014, she then took part in the 2014 Cyprus Cup, where New Zealand won the match for 11th place against Finland. Two months later, she took part in the 2014 Oceania Championship, where Moore played in three matches. On 14 May 2015, she was called up to New Zealand's squad at the 2015 FIFA World Cup in Canada. She was also nominated for the 2016 Olympic Games. She was substituted on in the 90th minute in the 1–0 win against Colombia.

She became a regular player from the 2017 Cyprus Cup onwards. On 10 June 2018, she scored her first goal for the senior national team in a 3–1 defeat against Asian champions Japan.

At the 2018 Oceania Championship, she played in four of the five games and scored two goals. As tournament winners, New Zealand qualified for the 2019 World Cup and the 2020 Summer Olympics.

In April 2019, Moore was named to the final 23-player squad for the 2019 FIFA World Cup, however while in France training before the tournament started, Moore snapped her Achilles. At the 2020 Olympic Games in Tokyo, which were postponed by a year due to the COVID-19 pandemic, she played in two of the three games.

On 20 February 2022, Moore scored a perfect hat-trick of own goals in a match against the United States at the SheBelieves Cup. Moore is believed to be the second player after Stan Van den Buys to score three own goals (although, as some sources mention, the third of Van den Buys's own goals was technically scored by Johan Walem, who touched the ball prior to it crossing the goal line after the ball was directed into goal by Van den Buys). ESPN reported that only the third goal was due to an obvious error, an ill-timed clearance kicking it into the goal. For the first, her block of a shot from wide bounced back into the net, and for the second, the ball hit her face to deflect into the net. United States coach, Vlatko Andonovski, said it was unfortunate that Moore was so unlucky, adding that "she's incredible and ... her positioning was very [good]".

In June 2023, Moore, Ava Collins, and Kate Taylor were named as reserve players for the 2023 FIFA World Cup. However, Moore declined to join the squad as a reserve player and Grace Wisnewski was called up as a reserve player instead.

On 4 July 2024, Moore was called up to the New Zealand squad for the 2024 Summer Olympics.

== International goals ==
No.	Date	Venue	Opponent	Score	Result	Competition
1.	10 June 2018	Westpac Stadium, Wellington, New Zealand	Japan	1–1	1–3	International Friendly
2.	25 November 2018	Stade Numa-Daly Magenta, Nouméa, New Caledonia	Fiji	5–0	10–0	2018 OFC Women's Nations Cup
3.	1 December 2018	Stade Numa-Daly Magenta, Nouméa, New Caledonia	Fiji	4–0	8–0	2018 OFC Women's Nations Cup
4.	6 September 2022	Titan Stadium, Fullerton, United States	Philippines	1–1	2–1	Friendly

== Honours ==
Individual

- Mainland Football Defender of the Year: 2012, 2014

Team

- U-17 Oceania Champions 2012
- U-20 Oceania Champions 2014
- Oceania Champion: 2014, 2018
