= Talia White =

Canadian soccer player (born 1998)

- White in 2025

Personal information
- Date of birth: October 16, 1998 (age 28)
- Place of birth: Calgary, Alberta, Canada
- Height: 1.70 m (5 ft 7 in)
- Position: Defender

Team information
- Current team: Calgary Wild FC
- Number: 44

Youth career
- Calgary Foothills WFC

College career
Years	Team	Apps	(Gls)
2016–2021	Calgary Dinos	83	(0)

Senior career*
Years	Team	Apps	(Gls)
2017–2019	Calgary Foothills WFC	18	(0)
2022	South Hobart FC	17	(5)
2023	Essendon Royals SC	17	(2)
2024	Treaty United	7	(0)
2025–	Calgary Wild FC	16	(0)
- * Club domestic league appearances and goals as of October 28, 2026

Talia White (born October 16, 1998) is a Canadian soccer player who plays for Calgary Wild FC in the Northern Super League.

== University career ==
In 2016, White began attending the University of Calgary, where she played for the women's soccer team. At the end of her rookie season, she was named the Canada West Rookie of the Year and a Canada West Second Team All-Star. In 2017, she was named a Canada West First Team All-Star. In her third season, she was again named a Canada West First Team All-Star and was also named a U Sports First Team All-Canadian. In 2019, she was named a Canada West Second Team All-Star and an Academic All-Canadian. After the 2020 season was cancelled due to the COVID-19 pandemic, she returned for a fifth season in 2021.

== Club career ==
From 2017 to 2019, she played with Calgary Foothills WFC in United Women's Soccer.

In February 2022, White signed with Australian club South Hobart FC in the Tasmania Women's Super League.

In 2023, she played with Australian club Essendon Royals SC.

In December 2023, White signed with League of Ireland Women's Premier Division club Treaty United for the 2024 season. She was then named the team captain for the 2024 season.

In January 2025, she signed with Calgary Wild FC of the Northern Super League.
