= Sonia O'Neill =

Venezuelan footballer (born 1994)

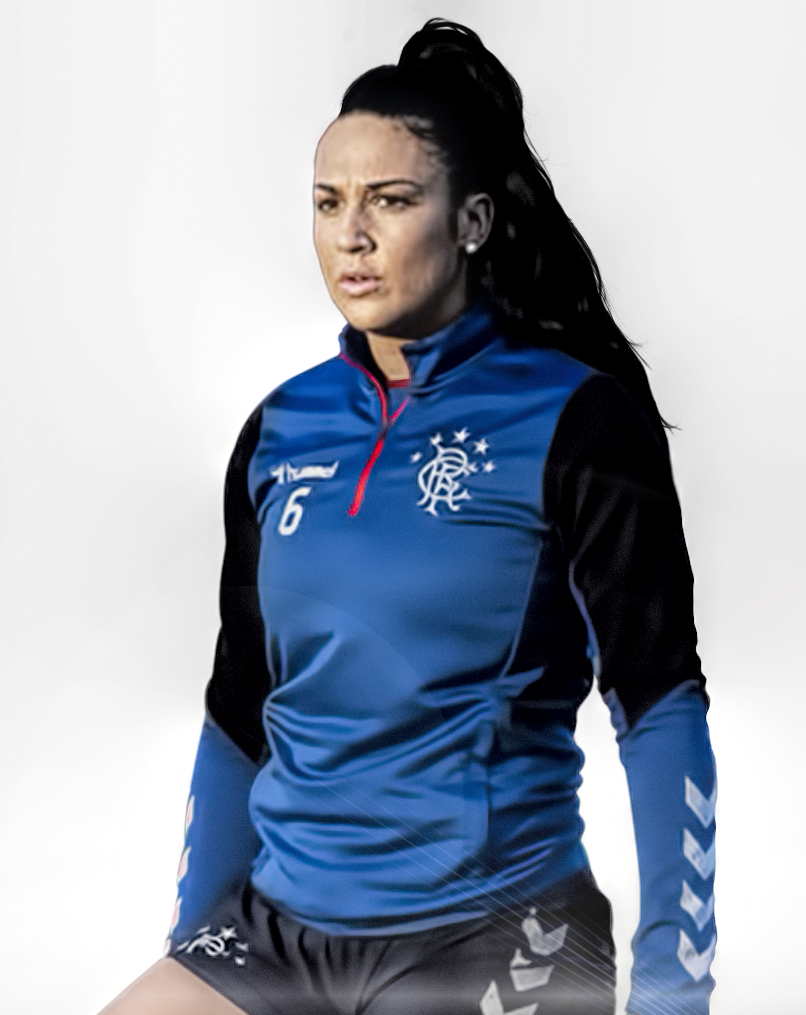

Personal information
- Full name: Sonia María O'Neill Caroli
- Date of birth: 19 August 1994 (age 32)
- Place of birth: Toronto, Ontario, Canada
- Height: 1.71 m (5 ft 7 in)
- Position: Midfielder

Team information
- Current team: Calgary Wild FC
- Number: 8

Youth career
- North York Hearts-Azzurri
- Master's FA

College career
Years	Team	Apps	(Gls)
2012–2013	Niagara Purple Eagles	31	(0)
2014–2016	North Florida Ospreys	29	(0)

Senior career*
Years	Team	Apps	(Gls)
2017	Husqvarna FF	4	(2)
2018	Roma CF	8	(2)
2018–2019	Pink Bari	21	(0)
2019	Split	1	(0)
2019	Fleury	0	(0)
2020–2021	Rangers	13	(2)
2021–2022	Split	15	(5)
2022–2023	Turbine Potsdam	0	(0)
2022–2023	Turbine Potsdam II	6	(0)
2023–2024	London City Lionesses	2	(0)
2025–	Calgary Wild FC	33	(1)
2026–	→ Calgary Wild FC U23	1	(0)

International career^{‡}
2021–	Venezuela	13	(0)
Medal record
Women's football
Representing Venezuela
Central American and Caribbean Games
Silver medal – second place	2023 San Salvador
- * Club domestic league appearances and goals as of October 28, 2026 ‡ National team caps and goals as of 1 July 2023

Sonia María O'Neill Caroli (born 19 August 1994) is a footballer who plays as a midfielder for Calgary Wild FC in the Northern Super League and the Venezuela women's national team. Born in Canada, she represents Venezuela at international level.

== Early life ==
O'Neill played youth soccer with North York Hearts-Azzurri and Master's FA.

== College career ==
In 2012, O'Neill began attending Niagara University, where she played for the women's soccer team. During her first season, she tore the cruciate ligaments in her knee.

In 2014, she moved to the University of North Florida to join their women's soccer team. She did not play in 2014 due to a season-ending knee injury. In 2015, she was named to the Atlantic Sun Conference Academic Honour Roll.

== Club career ==
In May 2017, O'Neill joined Swedish Elitettan club Husqvarna FF, scoring two goals in her first match. After two months, she had to return to Canada due to visa issues.

In February 2018, she moved to Roma CF to play in the Italian Serie B.

In September 2018, she signed with Pink Bari in the Serie A.

In August 2019, she briefly played with Croatian club ŽNK Split at the 2019–20 UEFA Women's Champions League.

In September 2019, O'Neill signed with French Division 1 Féminine club Fleury.

In January 2020, she joined Scottish Women's Premier League club Rangers.

In 2021, she returned to play for Split again.

In September 2022, she joined German club Turbine Potsdam.

In July 2023, she announced she was taking a step away from the game for a period for her mental health due to the toxic nature of women's football.

In August 2023, she signed with English club London City Lionesses in the second tier Women's Championship. In December 2023, she took another break from the game due to her pregnancy, missing the remainder of the season.

In December 2024, O'Neill joined Calgary Wild ahead of the inaugural Northern Super League season. On April 16, 2025, she started in the league's inaugural game, a 1–0 loss to Vancouver Rise FC.

== International career ==
O'Neill was eligible to represent for Canada, Venezuela, or Italy at international level.

In late October 2019, she was called up to the Venezuelan national team for the first time. She made her debut on 8 April 2021 in a friendly against Argentina.
