= Sarah Keilty-Dilling =

Canadian soccer player (born 1993)

Personal information
- Full name: Sarah Elizabeth Keilty-Dilling
- Birth name: Sarah Elizabeth Dilling
- Date of birth: July 15, 1993 (age 33)
- Place of birth: Calgary, Alberta, Canada
- Height: 5 ft 8 in (1.73 m)
- Position: Goalkeeper

Team information
- Current team: Calgary Wild FC
- Number: 26

Youth career
- Calgary South West United SC
- Calgary Chinooks FC
- Calgary South West United SC

College career
Years	Team	Apps	(Gls)
2011–2014	UTEP Miners	82	(0)

Senior career*
Years	Team	Apps	(Gls)
2015	FC Tucson		
2016–2023	Calgary Foothills WFC		
2025–	Calgary Wild FC	8	(0)
2026–	→ Calgary Wild FC U23	3	(0)

International career
2017	Canada Universiade		
- * Club domestic league appearances and goals as of October 28, 2026

Sarah Elizabeth Keilty-Dilling (née Dilling; born July 15, 1993) is a Canadian soccer player who plays for Calgary Wild FC in the Northern Super League.

== Early life ==
Keilty-Dilling began playing youth soccer with Calgary South West United, later joining Chinooks FC before returning to Calgary South West United.

== College career ==
In 2011, Dilling began attending the University of Texas at El Paso, where she played for the women's soccer team. On August 19, 2011, she made her collegiate debut, in a 2-0 victory over the New Mexico State Aggies. At the end of her first season, she was named to the Conference USA All-Freshman Team and was named to the Conference USA All-Tournament Team, as UTEP advanced to the finals where they were defeated by the Memphis Tigers in double overtime. In September 2012, she was named the Conference USA Defensive Player of the Week. On October 19, 2014, she recorded her 19th shutout to become the team's all-timer leader in the category. In 2014, she was named to the All-Conference USA First Team and the UTEP Female Athlete of the Year. After her four-year tenure with the soccer team, she finished as the team's all-time leader in games started (82), wins (41), and shutouts (20).

== Club career ==
In 2015, she joined FC Tucson in the Women's Premier Soccer League, recording five shutouts and was named to the WPSL All-Star Team.

In 2016, she joined the Calgary Foothills WFC in United Women's Soccer. In 2021, she was named to the UWS West Conference Second Team, followed by earning UWS Goalkeeper of the Year and UWS West Conference First Team honours in 2022.

In November 2024, she signed a professional contract with Calgary Wild FC, ahead of the inaugural 2025 season. She made her first team debut on August 29, 2026, against Vancouver Rise FC.

== International career ==
In 2010, she attended training camps with the Canada U17 and Canada U20 teams. In 2017, she was named to the Canada roster for the 2017 Universiade Games.

== Personal life ==
In September 2022, her now-wife, Jill Keilty, proposed to her at the Calgary Saddledome, the home arena of the NHL's Calgary Flames.

Keilty-Dilling worked as a Physical Education teacher at Ian Bazalgette Junior High School, before signing her professional soccer contract. In 2025, she launched Keepers Corner along with the other goalkeepers of Calgary Wild FC, where the team would donate 20 tickets to each Wild home game for students at the school.
