= Jenaya Robertson =

Canadian soccer player (born 1997)

Personal information
- Full name: Jenaya Hope Robertson
- Date of birth: April 8, 1997 (age 29)
- Place of birth: Delta, British Columbia, Canada
- Height: 5 ft 7 in (1.70 m)
- Position: Midfielder

Team information
- Current team: Calgary Wild FC
- Number: 16

Youth career
- 2009–2010: SurDel Girls SC
- Coastal FC

College career
Years	Team	Apps	(Gls)
2015–2019	Trinity Western Spartans	92	(34)

Senior career*
Years	Team	Apps	(Gls)
2021	FC Würzburger Kickers	10	(0)
2022	CP Cacereño	5	(0)
2023	Shelbourne	3	(0)
2024	Athlone Town	4	(0)
2024	Unity FC	7	(3)
2025–	Calgary Wild FC	38	(2)
- * Club domestic league appearances and goals as of October 28, 2026

Jenaya Hope Robertson (born April 8, 1997) is a Canadian soccer player who plays for Calgary Wild FC in the Northern Super League.

== Early life ==
Robertson played youth soccer with Coastal FC. She also played with SurDel Girls SC for one season in 2009-2010. Through high school and her early university career, she played five years while having a torn ACL.

== University career ==
In 2015, Robertson began attending Trinity Western University, where she played for the women's soccer team. On September 19, 2015, she scored her first goal in a victory over the Thompson Rivers WolfPack. In 2017, she was named team captain. In 2018, she was named a Canada West Second Team All-Star. In 2019, she returned for a fifth season scored a school-record 14 goals. That season, she was named the Canada West Player of the Year and a Canada West First Team All-Star, and was a finalist for the overall Canada West Athlete of the Year. In addition, she was named the U Sports Player of the Year and a First Team All-Canadian. She was also named the 2019 Trinity Western Female Athlete of the Year and also awarded the Complete Champion Award, the most prestigious honour a Spartan athlete can earn over their career at TWU. Over her time at TWU, she was also a three-time Academic All-Canadian.

== Club career ==
In February 2021, she signed with German 2. Frauen-Bundesliga club FC Würzburger Kickers. At the end of the season, she departed the club.

In March 2022, she signed with Spanish club CP Cacereño, for the remainder of the 2021-22 season.

In February 2023, she signed with League of Ireland Women's Premier Division club Shelbourne.

In February 2024, she signed with Athlone Town.

In the summer of 2024, she played with League1 British Columbia club Unity FC.

In January 2025, she signed with Calgary Wild FC of the Northern Super League. On April 16, 2025, she came on as a substitute in the league's inaugural game, a 1-0 defeat to Vancouver Rise FC. On May 18, 2025, she scored her first goal in a 1-0 victory over Montreal Roses FC, scoring the team's first ever goal at home, helping them to their first home win. On January 23, 2026, it was announced that she had signed a contract extension to keep her with the Wild through 2026.
