= Caleigh Boeckx =

Canadian soccer player (born 2000)

Personal information
- Full name: Caleigh Tiara Boeckx
- Date of birth: July 26, 2000 (age 26)
- Place of birth: Calgary, Alberta, Canada
- Height: 5 ft 4 in (1.63 m)
- Position: Defender

Team information
- Current team: Calgary Wild FC
- Number: 7

Youth career
- Calgary Blizzard SC
- Calgary South West United SC

College career
Years	Team	Apps	(Gls)
2018–2021	Rice Owls	68	(8)

Senior career*
Years	Team	Apps	(Gls)
2018–2019	Calgary Foothills WFC	17	(1)
2023	Calgary Foothills WFC		
2024	Treaty United	16	(2)
2025–	Calgary Wild FC	25	(0)

International career^{‡}
2020	Canada U20	4	(0)
- * Club domestic league appearances and goals as of October 28, 2026 ‡ National team caps and goals as of March 4, 2020

Caleigh Tiara Boeckx (born July 26, 2000) is a Canadian soccer player who plays for Calgary Wild FC in the Northern Super League.

== Early life ==
Boeckx began playing youth soccer at age eight with Calgary Blizzard SC. She later played with Calgary South West United SC. She also played with the Alberta provincial team and was a member of the Canada NDC program in Alberta. In 2017, she represented Team Alberta at the 2017 Canada Summer Games.

== College career ==
In 2018, Boeckx began attending Rice University, where she played for the women's soccer team. She made her collegiate debut on August 17, 2018, against the Texas Longhorns. On August 26, she scored her first collegiate goal in a victory over the Texas A&M–Corpus Christi Islanders. In her third season, she helped Rice win the Conference USA title and was named to the C-USA All-Tournament team and was also named a Rice Scholar Athlete. In August 2021, she was named the Conference USA Defender of the Week. She was awarded the Conference USA Academic Medal and named to the Conference USA Commissioner's Honor Roll all four years she attended the school.

== Club career ==
In 2018 and 2019, Boeckx played with Calgary Foothills WFC in United Women's Soccer. She returned to the team in the summer of 2023.

In January 2024, she signed with League of Ireland Women's Premier Division club Treaty United. In November 2024, she departed the club, having recorded three goals and three assists in 22 appearances, across all competitions.

In December 2024, she signed with Canadian Northern Super League club Calgary Wild FC, ahead of their inaugural season in 2025. On April 16, 2025, she came on as a substitute in the league's inaugural game, a 1-0 defeat to Vancouver Rise FC.

== International career ==
In August 2017, Boeckx made her debut in the Canadian program attending a camp with the Canada U20. She was later named to the roster for the 2020 CONCACAF Women's U-20 Championship.
