= Lydia Bedford =

English football coach

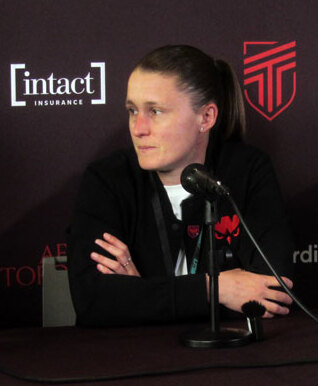
- Bedford in 2025

Personal information
- Full name: Lydia Mary Bedford
- Date of birth: 27 April 1987 (age 39)
- Place of birth: Guildford, Surrey, England

Team information
- Current team: England U23 (women) (head coach)

Managerial career
- Years: Team
- England U15 (women)
- England U16 (women)
- England U17 (women)
- 2021–2022: Leicester City Women
- 2023: Arsenal Women (assistant)
- 2023–2024: Brentford U18
- 2025–2026: Calgary Wild
- 2026–: England U23 (women)

Lydia Mary Bedford (born 27 April 1987) is an English professional football coach who is the manager of the England women's national under-23 football team.

== Career ==
Bedford attended Brunel University of London studying to be a physical education teacher. By her graduation, she had obtained her B Level coaching license and was coaching at the Middlesex Girls Centre of Excellence with the U17s and was also working with the Barnet Ladies senior team, in addition to starting work as a teacher. She obtained her A coaching license in 2014 and began working with the English FA, where she eventually became the coach of the England U15, U16, and U17 women's teams. She earned her UEFA Pro Licence in 2019.

On 30 November 2021, Bedford was named the first team manager of Leicester City Women in the Women's Super League, effecting 6 December, for the remainder of the 2021–22 season. She led Leicester to their first top-flight win in her second match in charge, winning 2–0 over Birmingham City at home. In February 2022, she was named the FA Women's Super League Manager of the Month. In July 2022, after successfully keeping the team in the top division in 2021–22 season, she signed a new two-year deal with Leicester City Women. In November 2022, she was sacked by the club following a string of six consecutive losses.

In February 2023, she joined Arsenal Women as an assistant coach. She departed the club in June 2023.

On 1 June 2023 she was appointed as new coach of Brentford U18 men's team, the first woman to coach at the level.

In January 2025, Bedford was named the head coach of Canadian club Calgary Wild FC in the Northern Super League. She coached the Wild to a fifth-place finish in their inaugural season.

In March 2026, it was announced that Bedford had stepped down from her position with Calgary Wild FC, being named as the permanent head coach of the England women's national under-23 football team. Speaking about the appointment, Bedford said "it kind of feels like a full circle moment to be able to come back. The job I always wanted growing up was to be England manager one day." She coached the team to a 3–0 win over Sweden to win the 2025–26 U23 European Competition title on 17 April 2026.

== Honours ==
England U23 (Women)

- U23 European Competition: 2025–26

Individual

- FA Women's Super League Manager of the Month: February 2022
