= Calgary Wild FC =

Women's soccer club in Calgary, Alberta

- Founded: May 29, 2024; 2 years ago
- Stadium: McMahon Stadium; Calgary, Alberta
- Chair: Deanna Zumwalt
- Coach: Leah Blayney
- League: Northern Super League
- 2026: Regular season, 6th Playoffs, DNQ
- Website: calgarywildfc.com
Home colours	Away colours

Calgary Wild FC is a professional women's soccer club based in Calgary, Alberta, that competes in the Northern Super League, a league at the top of the women's Canadian soccer pyramid.

== History ==
In December 2022, it was announced that Calgary Foothills WFC secured the rights to establish a new franchise for the Northern Super League, which began play in 2025. In May 2024, it was announced that the rights to the franchise had been transferred from the Foothills to a new ownership group.

In May 2024, the club unveiled their name and branding, the first club in the league to do so. The club's logo consists of an owl made in red and violet, colours referencing the Calgary sky, with the rivers and mountains that make up Calgary's landscape are represented, and a W above the owl's eyes, with its five points representing the Famous Five (a group of women who fought to have women recognized as persons under Canadian law) and the five nations of Treaty 7. The Wild's mascot, Echo the Owl, was announced in May 2025. The club plays out of McMahon Stadium, with no seating capacity restrictions. The club's training grounds are the MaxWell Soccer Centre, located in the Foothills neighbourhood, approximately 14 kilometres to the southeast of McMahon Stadium.

In September 2024, it was announced that the club would assume the operations of the ASA High Performance program, operating them as their academy.

On April 16, 2025, the Wild played their first game, the inaugural game of the Northern Super League, a 1–0 loss to the Vancouver Rise. The Wild played their first home game on May 11, 2025, drawing 0-0 with Ottawa Rapid FC in front of 8,556 fans. The club finished the inaugural NSL season in fifth place with a total of 29 points.

On January 8, 2026, the Wild announced the launch of the Wild FC Academy, set to begin in February 2026, featuring U18 and U23 Reserve programs under the newly-appointed Academy Director Kennedi Kiarash, with head coach Lydia Bedford saying "Creating a clear, accessible pathway for young players to develop in a high-performance environment is critical, and this academy allows us to support athletes as they progress toward the highest levels of the game."

On March 9, 2026, it was announced that Lydia Bedford had departed the club to become head coach of the England women's national under-23 football team, with Sinead McSharry being named as interim head coach of the Wild. On July 6, 2026, it was announced that Leah Blayney had been hired as the club's new head coach on a permanent basis.

On May 13, 2026, it was announced that a majority stake in the ownership of the club had been bought by Alyssa Mitchell, an entrepreneur based in the United States.

== Players and staff ==
=== Players ===
As of August 15, 2026

Note: Flags indicate national team as defined under FIFA eligibility rules; some limited exceptions apply. Players may hold more than one non-FIFA nationality.

No.	Pos.	Nation	Player
1	GK	USA	Katelin Talbert
2	DF	CAN	Grace Stordy
3	MF	USA	Allie Hess
4	FW	USA	Jorian Baucom
5	DF	NZL	Meikayla Moore
6	MF	PHI	Jaclyn Sawicki
7	DF	CAN	Caleigh Boeckx
8	MF	VEN	Sonia O'Neill
11	DF	CAN	Tilly James
12	DF	CAN	Frederique St-Jean
15	FW	AUS	Kahli Johnson
16	MF	CAN	Jenaya Robertson

No.	Pos.	Nation	Player
18	FW	CAN	Serita Thurton
19	MF	WAL	Keelyn Stewart
22	MF	USA	Hannah Boughton
23	DF	USA	Taylor Otto
26	GK	CAN	Sarah Keilty-Dilling
28	MF	USA	Meggie Dougherty Howard
29	MF	CAN	Andersen Williams
30	FW	WAL	Taegan Stewart
33	MF	USA	Josie Aulicino
41	DF	USA	Madison Pogarch
44	DF	CAN	Talia White
99	FW	CAN	Mya Jones

Counts as a domestic player as she also holds Canadian nationality

=== Current staff ===
Executive
Board Chair	Deanna Zumwalt
Chief Executive Officer	Lara Murphy
Coaching staff
Head coach	(Australia) Leah Blayney

=== Club captains ===
Years	Name	Nation
2025–present	Meggie Dougherty Howard	United States

== Colours and uniform ==
The home kit is primarily purple, with the secondary red logo and numbers. The deep purple is a symbol of ambition and power, and the red is a reference to the city of Calgary.

== Supporters ==
The main fan organization for the Calgary Wild is the Wild Roses Supporters Group. Beginning in May 2025, and driven by Wild goalkeeper Sarah Keilty-Dilling, the club launched the Keeper's Corner initiative, in partnership with KidSport Calgary and Ian Bazalgette Junior High School, which gave tickets to youth and their families from "underserved communities" and created a dedicated space for them during home games in Section W of McMahon Stadium.

== Managers ==
As of July 6, 2026:

Name	Tenure	Refs
(England) Lydia Bedford	January 3, 2025 – March 9, 2026	
(England) Sinead McSharry	March 9, 2026 – July 6, 2026	
(Australia) Leah Blayney	July 6, 2026 – present	
