= 2026 AFC Toronto season =

Canadian soccer club's season of play

AFC Toronto
2026 season
- CEO: Helena Ruken
- Head coach: Marko Milanović
- Stadium: York Lions Stadium; North York, Ontario

The 2026 AFC Toronto season is the second in the club's history, as well as the second season in Northern Super League history.

== Summary ==
During the 2025 season, AFC Toronto won the 2025 Supporters' Shield.

On February 2, 2026, AFC Toronto announced its 2026 preseason roster, featuring 19 returning players who had been part of the squad during the 2025 season, with head coach Marko Milanović saying “Having a strong core returning from last year allows us to build more quickly and raise standards. The additions we’ve made give us flexibility and competition across the group as we prepare for the season.”

On 22 April 2026, AFC Toronto announced that Nikayla Small would be captain for the 2026 season.

On 14 November 2026, AFC Toronto defeated Montreal Roses to win the Diana B. Matheson Cup.

== Team ==
=== Coaching staff ===
As of August 7, 2024

Position	Name
Head coach	Marko Milanović
Assistant coach	Sylvia Forbes
Goalkeeping coach	Rasih Pala
Head Athletic Therapist	Karla Leong
Sports Science & Performance coach	Mariana Gonzalez Moreno
Athletic therapist	Kia Halsall

=== Roster ===
As of April 21, 2026.

No.	Nat.	Name	Date of birth (age)	Since	Previous club	Notes
Goalkeepers
13	(Portugal)	Sierra Cota-Yarde	4 July 2003 (age 23)	2025	(Canada) North Toronto Nitros	
18	(Canada)	Sabrina D'Angelo	11 May 1993 (age 33)	2026	(England) Aston Villa	
33	(Canada)	Danielle Krzyzaniak	21 September 1996 (age 30)	2025	(Australia) Newcastle Jets	
Defenders
5	(United States)	Croix Soto	2 January 2001 (age 25)	2025	(United States) Houston Dash	INT
12	(Canada)	Zoe Burns	5 January 2002 (age 24)	2025	(France) Fleury	
14	(Canada)	Sarah Rollins	15 March 2005 (age 21)	2025	(Canada) North Toronto Nitros	
19	(Canada)	Ashley Cathro	19 January 2000 (age 26)	2025	Free agent	
23	(Haiti)	Jasmine Vilgrain		2026		
24	(Canada)	Shelina Zadorsky	24 October 1992 (age 34)	2026	(England) West Ham United	
94	(Canada)	Victoria Pickett	12 August 1996 (age 30)	2025	(United States) North Carolina Courage	
Midfielders
2	(Canada)	April Lantaigne	21 April 2006 (age 20)	2025	(United States) South Alabama Jaguars	
4	(Jamaica)	Nikayla Small	24 March 2003 (age 23)	2025	(United States) Wake Forest Demon Deacons	CAP
8	(Canada)	Samantha Chang	13 July 2000 (age 26)	2026	(Canada) Vancouver Rise FC	
10	(Canada)	Sarah Stratigakis	7 March 1999 (age 27)	2025	(France) Saint-Étienne	
16	(Canada)	Olivia Chisholm	5 December 2008 (age 17)	2025	(Canada) NDC Ontario	
17	(Canada)	Nyota Katembo	7 January 2001 (age 25)	2025	(United States) Indy Eleven	
20	(United States)	Zoe Hasenauer	13 January 2000 (age 26)	2026	(Germany) 1. FC Köln	INT
22	(Saint Kitts and Nevis)	Cloey Uddenberg	13 November 2002 (age 24)	2025	(Canada) Simcoe County Rovers FC	
31	(United States)	Colby Barnett	13 February 2003 (age 23)	2025	(United States) Santa Clara Broncos	INT
53	(Ghana)	Linda Owusu Ansah	3 July 2006 (age 20)	2026	(Ghana) Ampem Darkoa Ladies F.C.	INT
Forwards
7	(Canada)	Kaila Novak	24 March 2002 (age 24)	2025	(England) Durham	
9	(Nigeria)	Esther Okoronkwo	27 March 1997 (age 29)	2025	(China) Changchun Dazhong Zhuoyue	INT
11	(Canada)	Kaylee Hunter	22 January 2008 (age 18)	2025	(Canada) Whitecaps FC Girls Elite	
21	(United States)	Mia Fontana	19 June 2001 (age 25)	2026		INT
28	(Canada)	Lena Silano	28 February 2000 (age 26)	2026	Free agent	
77	(Canada)	Lauren Rowe	3 July 2004 (age 22)	2025	(Canada) North Toronto Nitros	
Left during the season
1	(Finland)	Sofia Manner	11 September 1997 (age 29)	2025	(United States) Orlando Pride	INT
3	(United States)	Jordan Brewster	27 September 1999 (age 27)	2026	(Mexico) Club América	INT
6	(Canada)	Kaela Hansen	13 April 2000 (age 26)	2025	(Finland) KuPS	

== Competitions ==
=== Northern Super League ===
==== Table ====
Pos	Team	Pld	W	D	L	GF	GA	GD	Pts	Playoff qualification
1	Montreal Roses (S)	25	12	9	4	43	27	+16	45	Advance to play-offs
2	Ottawa Rapid	25	12	4	9	49	44	+5	40	Advance to play-offs
3	AFC Toronto	25	10	9	6	38	24	+14	39	Advance to play-offs
4	Vancouver Rise	25	9	4	12	47	55	−8	31	Advance to play-offs
5	Halifax Tides	25	7	8	10	24	24	0	29	
6	Calgary Wild	25	5	6	14	28	55	−27	21	

Source: NSL
Rules for classification: 1) Points 2) Head-to-head points; 3) Head-to-head goal difference; 4) Goal difference; 5) Wins; 6) Goals scored; 7) Goals conceded; 8) Least red cards; 9) Least yellow cards; 10) Drawing of lots.
(S) Supporters' Shield winner

==== Matches ====
===== April and May =====
April 24, 2026 1	Vancouver Rise FC	2–3	AFC Toronto	Burnaby, British Columbia
	Reyes 17' (yellow card) 45'; Abdu 40'; Stanton (yellow card) 63'; Wright (yellow card) 78'	Report	Burns 7'; Stratigakis 60' (yellow card) 64'; Okoronkwo 71'	Stadium: Swangard Stadium; Attendance: 4,723; Referee: Carly Shaw-MacLaren

May 3, 2026 2	AFC Toronto	0–0	Halifax Tides	Toronto, Ontario
		Report	Cardoza (yellow card) 45'	Stadium: BMO Field; Attendance: 6,476; Referee: Shelia Couture

May 10, 2026 3	AFC Toronto	0–1	Montreal Roses FC	Toronto, Ontario
			Bennett 88'	Stadium: BMO Field; Attendance: 3,153; Referee: Scott Bowman

May 23, 2026 4	Vancouver Rise FC	2–1	AFC Toronto	Burnaby, British Columbia
	Abdu 11'; Quinn 33' (pen.); Filippo (yellow card) 41'	Report	Uddenberg 90+2'	Stadium: Swangard Stadium; Attendance: 3,526; Referee: Alain Ruch

May 31, 2026 5	Calgary Wild FC	0–4	AFC Toronto	Calgary, Alberta
	Johnson (yellow card) 52'	Report	Rowe 12'; Hunter 48'; Stratigakis (yellow card) 68' (goal) 74'; Chisholm (yellow card) 77'; Novak 90+1'	Stadium: McMahon Stadium; Attendance: 2,718; Referee: Roberto D'Alesio

===== June =====
June 13, 2026 7	AFC Toronto	1–1	Montreal Roses	Toronto, Ontario
	Brewster (yellow card) 56'; Rowe 68'; Hunter (yellow card) 85'; Fontana (yellow card) 89'	Report	Cappadona (yellow card) 83'	Stadium: York Lions Stadium; Attendance: 2,554; Referee: Myriam Marcotte

June 21, 2026 7	Ottawa Rapid FC	1–1	AFC Toronto	Ottawa, Ontario
	Pridham 3'; Melenhorst (yellow card) 45+1'; Choo (yellow card) 57'; Belzile (yellow card) 78'	Report	Rowe 7'; Stratigakis (yellow card) 33'	Stadium: TD Place Stadium; Attendance: 3,069; Referee: Isabelle Duclos

June 28, 2026 8	Vancouver Rise FC	1–3	AFC Toronto	Burnaby, British Columbia
	Oularbi 37'; Stanton (yellow card) 60'; De Filippo (yellow card) 67'	Report	Cowart 34' (o.g.); Rowe 62'; Hunter 90+2'	Stadium: Swangard Stadium; Attendance: 3,451; Referee: Myriam Marcotte

===== July =====
July 5, 2026 9	Halifax Tides FC	0–1	AFC Toronto	Halifax, Nova Scotia
		Report	Hunter 12' (yellow card) 85'; Small (yellow card) 71'; Owusu Ansah (yellow card) 90+1'	Stadium: Wanderers Grounds; Attendance: 3,913; Referee: Salma Flores-Desrochers

July 11, 2026 10	AFC Toronto	1–2	Ottawa Rapid FC	Toronto, Ontario
	Rowe 2'; Barnett (red card) 59'	Report	Lee 12'; Melenhorst (yellow card) 62'; Baie Pridham 87'	Stadium: York Lions Stadium; Attendance: 2,519; Referee: Angelina Baldino

July 18, 2026 11	AFC Toronto	0–3	Vancouver Rise	Toronto, Ontario
	Small (yellow card) 37'; Brewster (yellow card) 82'; Rowe (yellow card) 90+11'	Report	Bout 2'; De Filippo 9'; Tumeth 11'; López (yellow card) 13'; Stanton (yellow card) 90+2'	Stadium: York Lions Stadium; Referee: Salma Flores-Desrochers

July 23, 2026 12	Montreal Roses	0–2	AFC Toronto	Laval, Quebec
	Minas (yellow card) 32' (yellow-red card) 73'	Report	Rollins (yellow card) 19'; Uddenberg (yellow card) 29'; Rowe 49'; Small (yellow card) 52'; Zadorsky (yellow card) 70'; Hunter 74'	Stadium: Stade Boréale; Referee: Sheila Couture

July 28, 2026 13	AFC Toronto	1–0	Calgary Wild FC	Toronto, Ontario
	Hunter 50'; Chisholm (yellow card) 77'	Report		Stadium: York Lions Stadium; Attendance: 2,682; Referee: Mario Alayass

===== August =====
August 1, 2026 14	Calgary Wild FC	0–6	AFC Toronto	Calgary, Alberta
	Stordy (red card) 33'	Report	Hunter 21', 33', (yellow card) 54'; Rowe 36'; Barnett 41'; Rollins 58'; Novak 90+1'	Stadium: McMahon Stadium; Attendance: 2,232; Referee: Isabelle Duclos

August 9, 2026 15	Ottawa Rapid FC	2–2	AFC Toronto	Ottawa, Ontario
	Forbes 13'; Adamek (yellow card) 55'; Hyo-Joo (red card) 62'; Golen 90+1'	Report	Stratigakis 34'; Uddenberg (red card) 62'; Zadorsky 77'	Stadium: TD Place Stadium; Attendance: 3,152; Referee: Scott Bowman

August 16, 2026 16	AFC Toronto	1–2	Montreal Roses	Toronto, Ontario
	Zadorsky 68'	Report	Alidou 55'; Bennett 74'	Stadium: BMO Field; Referee: Anne-Marie Canuel

August 23, 2026 17	Halifax Tides	0–2	AFC Toronto	Halifax, Nova Scotia
	Weichers (yellow card) 30'	Report	Small 20'; Hunter 32'	Stadium: Wanderers Grounds; Attendance: 3,368; Referee: Sheila Couture

August 30, 2026 18	AFC Toronto	2–1	Ottawa Rapid FC	Toronto, Ontario
	Hunter 73'; Stratigakis 86'	Report	Jung (yellow card) 72'; Belzile 89'	Stadium: BMO Field; Attendance: 7,157; Referee: Carly Shaw-Maclaren

===== September =====
September 6, 2026 19	AFC Toronto	0–0	Calgary Wild	Toronto, Ontario
		Report	Baucom (yellow card) 53'	Stadium: BMO Field; Referee: Mathieu Souaré

September 10, 2026 20	Montreal Roses	2–2	AFC Toronto	Laval, Quebec
	Whitaker 18'; Bilbault (yellow card) 38'; Pierre-Louis 79'	Report	Rollins (yellow card) 24'; Rowe 82'; Small (yellow card) 83' (goal) 88'	Stadium: Stade Boréale; Referee: Sebastian Noshinravani

September 19, 2026 21	Halifax Tides FC	1–1	AFC Toronto	Halifax, Nova Scotia
	Vallerand 59'	Report	Tóth 1' (o.g.)	Stadium: Wanderers Grounds; Referee: Salma Flores-Desrochers

September 26, 2026 22	AFC Toronto	3–0	Ottawa Rapid FC	Toronto, Ontario
	Silano 44', 49'; Stratigakis 82'	Report		Stadium: York Lions Stadium; Attendance: 2,251; Referee: Carly Shaw-Maclaren

===== October =====
October 4, 2026 23 (Note: This game doubled as a quarter-final match in the 2026–27 W Canadian Championship and counted in both competitions; this game counted as a 1–1 draw in the NSL standings and a 2–1 victory in the W Canadian Championship.)	AFC Toronto	2–1 (a.e.t.)	Vancouver Rise FC	Toronto, Ontario
	Silano 19'; Hunter 100'	Report	Abdu 27'	Stadium: York Lions Stadium; Attendance: 2,675; Referee: Sheila Couture

October 18, 2026 24	AFC Toronto	0–1	Calgary Wild	Toronto, Ontario
	Milanović (yellow card) 79'	Report	Baucom 5'; Jones (yellow card) 16'; Moore (yellow card) 41'	Stadium: BMO Field; Referee: Myriam Marcotte

October 26, 2026 25	AFC Toronto	1–1	Halifax Tides FC	Toronto, Ontario
7:00 PM EDT	28' Hunter	Report	44' Miller	Stadium: BMO Field; Referee: Salma Flores-Desrochers

===== Playoffs =====
October 31, 2026 Quarter-finals Leg 1	AFC Toronto	4–2	Ottawa Rapid FC	North York, Ontario
2:00 pm EST	Lantaigne 11' (yellow card) 62'; Hasenauer (yellow card) 12'; Hunter 25', 66'; Silano 54'	Report	Forbes (yellow card) 19'; Melenhorst (yellow card) 47' (goal) 90'; Choo 58'; Adamek (yellow card) 88'	Stadium: York Lions Stadium; Referee: Scott Bowman

November 7, 2026 Quarter-finals Leg 2	Ottawa Rapid FC	0–4	AFC Toronto	Ottawa, Ontario
	Melenhorst (yellow card) 74'	Report	Hunter 6', 29'; Silano 44'; Small 52'; Zadorsky (yellow card) 61'	Stadium: TD Place Stadium; Referee: Alain Ruch

November 14, 2026 Final	Montreal Roses FC	0–1	AFC Toronto	TD Place Stadium
		Report	Chisholm 39'	Referee: Carly Shaw-Maclaren

=== W Canadian Championship ===
April 2027 Semi-finals	TBD	v	TBD	TBD
10:00 PT			TBD

== Transactions ==
=== Contract operations ===
Date	Player	Pos.	Notes	Ref.
17 December 2025	(Portugal) Sierra Cota-Yarde	GK	Contract extension through 2027	
17 December 2025	(Canada) Danielle Krzyzaniak	GK	Contract extension through 2026	
17 December 2025	(Canada) Kaela Hansen	DF	2026 club option exercised	
17 December 2025	(Canada) Ashley Cathro	DF	2026 club option exercised	
17 December 2025	(Canada) April Lantaigne	MF	2026 club option exercised	
17 December 2025	(Canada) Nikayla Small	MF	Contract extension through 2027	
17 December 2025	(Canada) Sarah Stratigakis	MF	Contract extension through 2027	
17 December 2025	(Saint Kitts and Nevis) Cloey Uddenberg	MF	2026 Club Option exercised	
17 December 2025	(Canada) Kaylee Hunter	FW	Contract extension through 2027 + 2028 Club Option	
15 January 2026	(Canada) Zoe Burns	DF	Contract extension through 2027	
15 January 2026	(Canada) Kaila Novak	FW	Contract extension through 2026	
15 January 2026	(Nigeria) Esther Okoronkwo	FW	Contract extension through 2027	
15 January 2026	(Canada) Lauren Rowe	MF	Contract extension through 2027	
17 July 2026	(Finland) Sofia Manner	GK	Mutual contract termination	

=== Transfers in ===
No.	Pos.	Player	From club	Fee/notes	Date	Source
8	MF	(Canada) Samantha Chang	(Canada) Vancouver Rise FC		8 January 2026	
94	MF	(Canada) Victoria Pickett	(United States) North Carolina Courage	Transfer	12 January 2026	
16	MF	(Canada) Olivia Chisholm	(Canada) NDC Ontario	Promoted to the first team	20 January 2026	
3	DF	(United States) Jordan Brewster	Free agent		17 April 2026	
21	FW	(United States) Mia Fontana	(United States) University of California, Berkeley		17 April 2026	
53	MF	(Ghana) Linda Owusu Ansah	(Ghana) Ampem Darkoa Ladies F.C.		22 May 2026	
18	GK	(Canada) Sabrina D'Angelo	(England) Aston Villa		26 June 2026	
24	DF	(Canada) Shelina Zadorsky	(England) West Ham		8 July 2026	
28	FW	(United States) Lena Silano	Free agent		17 July 2026	
23	DF	(Haiti) Jasmine Vilgrain	Free agent		5 September 2026	
20	MF	(United States) Zoe Hasenauer	(Germany) 1. FC Köln		5 September 2026	

=== Transfers out ===
No.	Pos.	Player	To club	Fee/notes	Date	Source
9	FW	(Canada) Jade Kovacevic		Retirement	11 December 2025	
3	DF	(South Korea) Hong Hye-ji			15 December 2025	
13	MF	(Japan) Aoi Kizaki	(Poland) Stomilanki Olsztyn		15 December 2025	
10	FW	(Canada) Leah Pais			15 December 2025	
20	MF	(Canada) Sonia Walk			15 December 2025	
8	DF	(Canada) Emma Regan	(United States) Denver Summit FC	Transfer	14 January 2026	
6	DF	(Canada) Kaela Hansen	(Canada) Vancouver Rise FC	Transfer	13 August 2026	
3	DF	(United States) Jordan Brewster	(United States) Houston Dash	Transfer	5 September 2026	
