= Kaylee Hunter =

Canadian soccer player (born 2008)

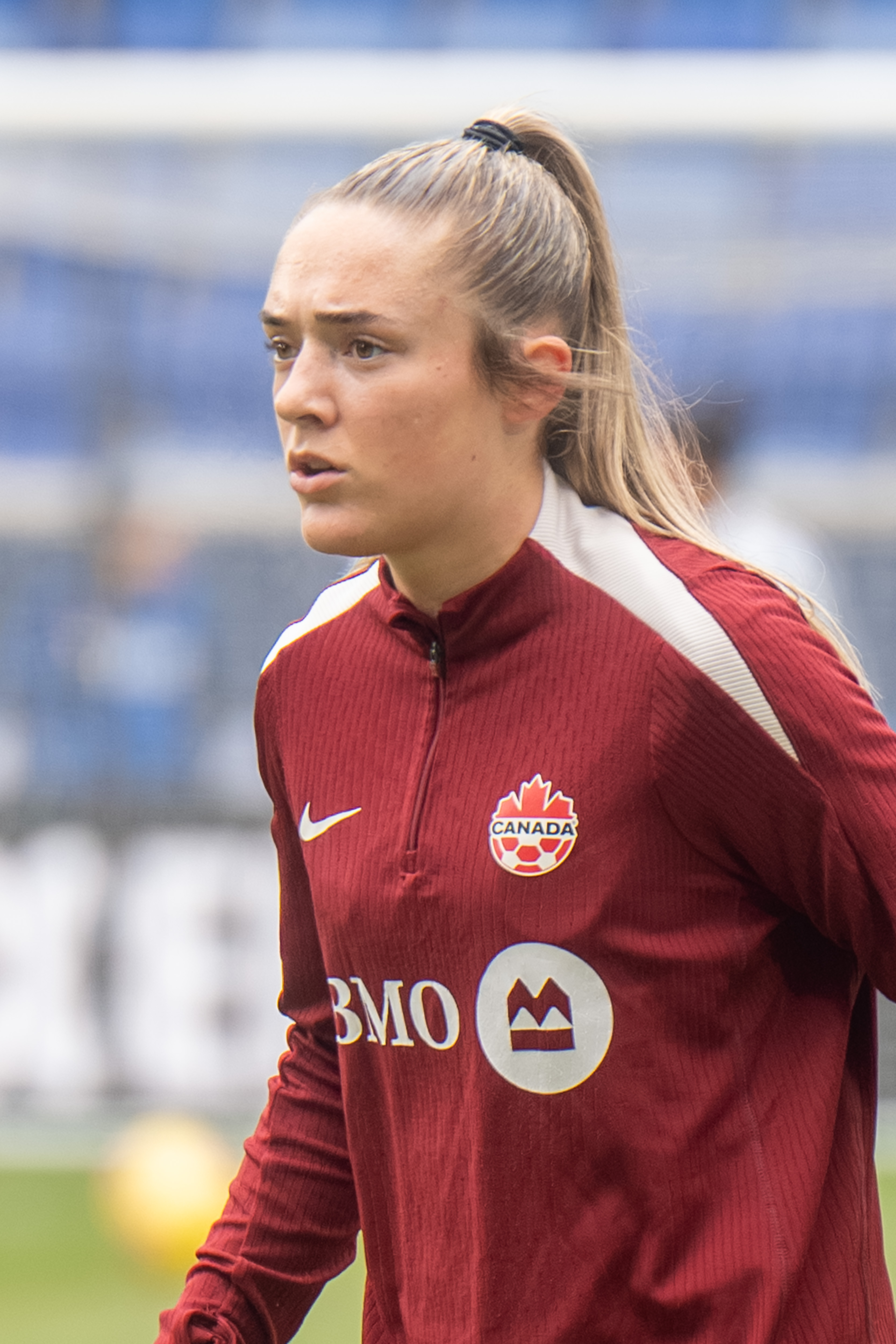
- Hunter with Canada in 2026

Personal information
- Full name: Kaylee Marie Hunter
- Date of birth: January 22, 2008 (age 18)
- Place of birth: Calgary, Alberta, Canada
- Height: 1.65 m (5 ft 5 in)
- Position: Forward

Team information
- Current team: AFC Toronto
- Number: 11

Youth career
- Calgary West SC
- Calgary Blizzard SC
- 2023–2024: Vancouver Whitecaps

Senior career*
| Years | Team | Apps | (Gls) |
| 2023 | Calgary Blizzard SC | — | (—) |
| 2023–2024 | Whitecaps FC Girls Elite | 15 | (13) |
| 2025– | AFC Toronto | 43 | (25) |

International career^{‡}
| 2023–2025 | Canada U17 | 8 | (9) |
| 2025– | Canada U20 | 3 | (7) |
| 2026– | Canada | 4 | (0) |
- * Club domestic league appearances and goals as of October 28, 2026 ‡ National team caps and goals as of October 12, 2026

Kaylee Marie Hunter (born January 22, 2008) is a Canadian soccer player who plays as a forward for AFC Toronto in the Northern Super League. She has been regarded as one of Canada's most promising young talents.

A youth product of Calgary Blizzard SC and Whitecaps FC Girls Elite, Hunter won league titles with both clubs before signing a professional contract with AFC Toronto in January 2025 ahead of the Northern Super League's inaugural season. She scored the first goal in franchise history and went on to finish the season as the league's second-top scorer, earning NSL Rookie of the Year and Team of the Season honours, while helping the club win the inaugural Supporters' Shield and reach the NSL Championship final.

Hunter represented Canada at the 2024 CONCACAF Women's U-17 Championship and the 2025 CONCACAF Women's U-20 Championship, winning the latter, before earning her first call-up to the senior national team in October 2025. She made her senior international debut at the 2026 SheBelieves Cup in March 2026.

== Early life ==
Hunter was born and raised in Calgary, Alberta. She began playing youth soccer at age four with Calgary West SC. Growing up with three older brothers, she has said she followed them into the sport, and that her mother would ask at the end of each season whether she wanted to continue playing, to which her answer "was always yes." She has described coming from a smaller soccer hub outside Ontario, Quebec or British Columbia as making her path to the professional game unusual, calling it "what makes my story unique."

== Club career ==
=== Early career ===
In 2023, Hunter began the season with Calgary Blizzard SC playing in the 2023 League1 Alberta Exhibition Series. Later in 2023, she joined Whitecaps FC Girls Elite in League1 British Columbia. She won league titles both years with the Whitecaps and was named the MVP at the 2024 Women's Inter-Provincial Championship. That same year, she was named the Whitecaps Most Promising Female Player / BMO RESP Academy Female Player.

=== AFC Toronto ===
==== 2025 ====
In January 2025, Hunter signed a professional contract with AFC Toronto in the Northern Super League. In an interview with DARBY, she described AFC Toronto's project as one built around youth and long-term development, saying that the club's "bright future is already here" and highlighting the role of community support in the team's growth. She has attributed her adjustment as the squad's youngest player to the team's culture, saying she was treated equally by her teammates despite her age. She made her professional debut on April 19, in a substitute appearance in the club's inaugural match. After beginning the season as a substitute, she said she focused on "trusting in my timing," crediting head coach Marko Milanović with the final say on selection, before earning a regular starting role. On April 27, she scored the first goal in franchise history, in a 2–1 loss to Ottawa Rapid FC. Reflecting on the goal, she said the achievement "didn't really hit me at all until after the game," calling it "something super, super special" as her first professional goal.

Hunter linked a mid-season scoring surge, in which she went from two goals in her first eight matches to eight in the following eight, to a run of three consecutive road games that included a match in her hometown of Calgary, saying she began to visualize herself scoring more as her form improved. On June 21, she scored a brace in a 3–1 victory over Halifax Tides FC. On July 11, she scored another brace in a 3–0 victory over Ottawa Rapid FC. Discussing her approach in front of goal during this stretch, she said that "sometimes you need to score the messy one" rather than waiting for a perfect chance, an approach she pointed to when describing a long-range goal scored against Montreal Roses FC after noticing goalkeeper Anna Karpenko positioned off her line following a pass from teammate Esther Okoronkwo, which she later named her favourite goal of the season.

The NSL named Hunter the league's Player of the Month for July 2025, an honour she described as reflecting her work ethic while crediting her teammates, and said she was consciously competing for the league's Golden Boot alongside Delaney Baie Pridham. On her attacking partnership with teammates Okoronkwo, Nikayla Small and Jade Kovacevic, she said the group's on-field chemistry stemmed from daily competition for starting positions in training. She also spoke positively of the Northern Super League's inaugural season, calling the level of competition and passion around the six-team, home-and-away format "amazing" despite the challenge of facing the same opponents repeatedly, and described York Lions Stadium, the club's home venue, as feeling "like our home," while noting a personal rivalry with Vancouver Whitecaps supporters, for whom she once played, saying their reaction gave her extra motivation when the team travelled to face the Vancouver Rise.

Hunter was credited as a key part of the team that won the inaugural NSL Supporters' Shield for finishing top of the regular season table, having scored 14 goals inher debut professional season, second behind only Ottawa's Pridham, and emerging as one of the league’s breakout attacking talents.

Hunter scored in the first-ever NSL semifinal as Toronto won 2–0 in the first leg against Montreal Roses FC on November 1. In the final, she scored the opening goal against the Vancouver Rise to give AFC Toronto the lead, but they would go on to lose the inaugural championship 2–1. Subsequently, Hunter was named as the NSL Rookie of the Year for the 2025 season as well as being named to the league's Team of the Season. On December 17, AFC Toronto announced a contract extension for Hunter through 2027 with a club option for 2028.

==== 2026 ====
Ahead of the 2026 season, Hunter stated a personal goal of scoring 20 or more goals, while also balancing her club campaign against a growing role with Canada's youth and senior national teams.

On May 31, Hunter scored in the 48th minute as part of a 4–0 victory over Calgary Wild FC. On July 5, she scored the winning goal in a 1–0 victory over Halifax Tides FC, her third goal of the season. On July 23, she recorded an assist and a goal in a 2–0 win over Montreal Roses FC, setting up a goal for Lauren Rowe before converting a free kick of her own after a Montreal player was sent off. On July 28, she converted a penalty kick to lead AFC Toronto to a 1–0 win over Calgary Wild FC. Four days later, on August 1, she scored a brace against Calgary Wild FC in a 6–0 win at McMahon Stadium. On August 23, she converted a penalty for her eighth goal of the campaign in a 2–0 win over Halifax Tides FC.

Hunter scored the opening goal in AFC Toronto's 2–1 victory over Ottawa Rapid FC on August 30, scoring from a free kick in the 73rd minute. The goal was her ninth of the campaign and moved her into second place in the Golden Boot race. The result also gave AFC Toronto its first win at BMO Field, following six previous winless matches.

== International career ==
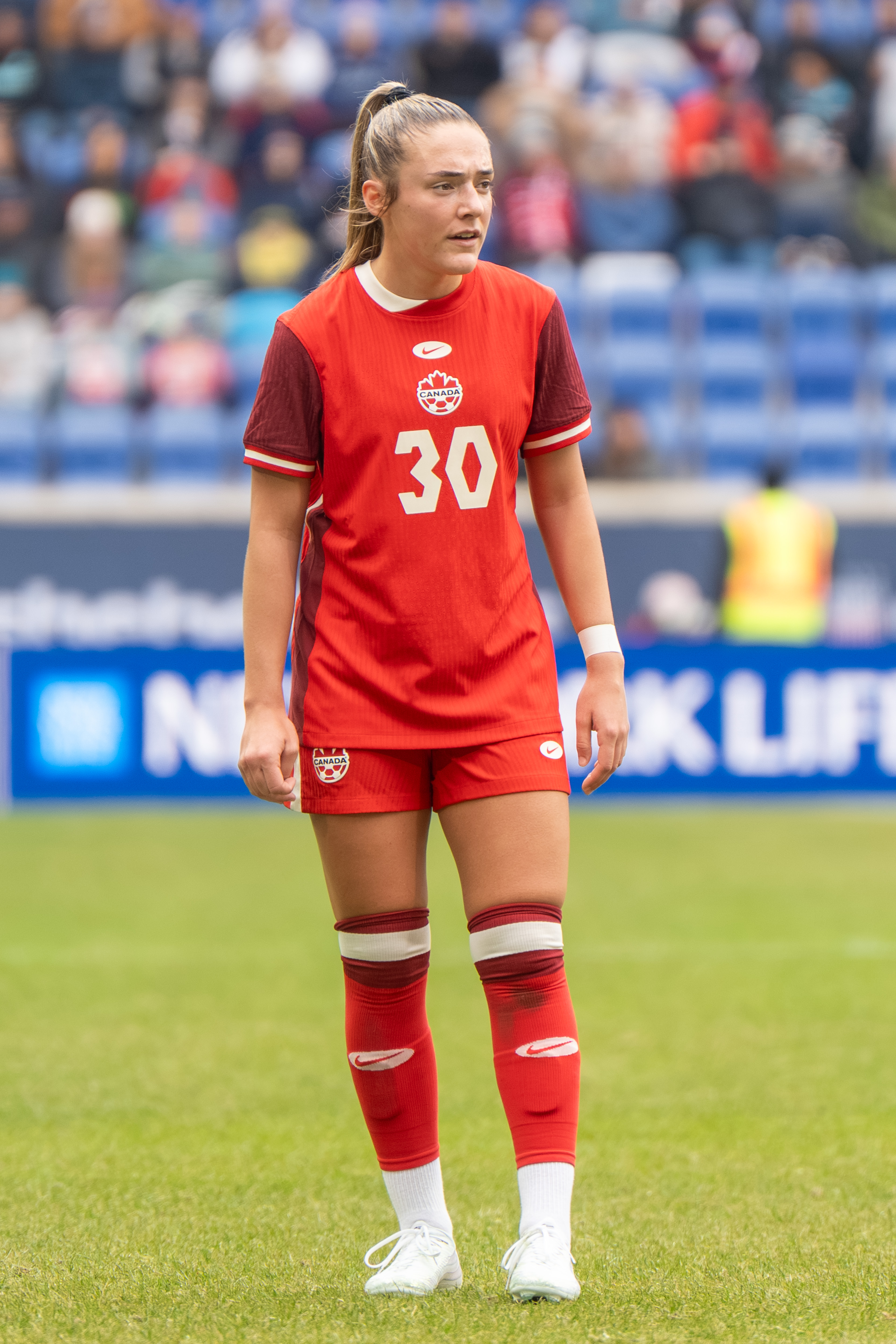
Hunter making her senior debut against Argentina in March 2026

=== Youth ===
Hunter was first called up to the Canada under-17 team in August 2023, for CONCACAF qualifying. She scored four goals in a 21–0 win over Dominica in Santo Domingo. She was named to the roster for the 2024 CONCACAF Women's U-17 Championship, where Canada finished third. In the third-place match on February 11, Haiti led inside seven minutes before Hunter scored three times to give Canada a 4–1 win and the bronze medal.

In March 2024, Hunter was called into a camp with the Canada under-20 team. She scored in a 3–1 friendly defeat to the United States on April 7, 2024. On February 21, 2025, she scored five goals in a 22–0 win over Dominica in qualifying for the 2025 CONCACAF Women's U-20 Championship, which Canada won in June, its first under-20 title since 2008. AFC Toronto did not release Hunter to join Canada's squad for the 2025 FIFA U-17 Women's World Cup in October 2025. On August 20, 2026, Hunter was named to the Canadian squad for the 2026 FIFA U-20 Women's World Cup in Poland. She scored in a 6–0 win over Tanzania in Canada's final group match on September 11, and the team advanced to the round of 16. On September 17, Hunter scored a hat trick in a 3–1 win over France in Łódź, with strikes in the 28th, 33rd and 70th minutes.

=== Senior ===
On October 13, 2025, head coach Casey Stoney named the 17-year-old Hunter in a 24-player squad for friendlies against Switzerland and the Netherlands, her first call-up to the senior Canada side. She made her senior debut on March 7, 2026, starting a goalless draw with Argentina at the 2026 SheBelieves Cup that Canada won 3–2 on penalties.

== Personal life ==
Hunter has cited Canadian forward Christine Sinclair as her primary soccer idol growing up, saying Sinclair "inspired generations" of players in the women's game, while also naming Cristiano Ronaldo, Kylian Mbappé and Neymar as players she admired on the men's side.

Reflecting on the growth of women's soccer in Canada, she has described community appearances with young fans as an opportunity to help "leave a legacy" for the next generation of players.

She has named Chelsea as the club she supports and hopes to play for in the future.

== Career statistics ==
=== Club ===
As of October 28, 2026

| Club | Season | League | | | Playoffs | | Domestic Cup | | Continental | | Other | | Total | |
| Club | Season | Division | Apps | Goals | Apps | Goals | Apps | Goals | Apps | Goals | Apps | Goals | Apps | Goals |
|---|---|---|---|---|---|---|---|---|---|---|---|---|---|---|
| Whitecaps FC Girls Elite | 2023 | League1 British Columbia | 4 | 5 | 2 | 3 | — | | — | | 0 | 0 | 6 | 8 |
| Whitecaps FC Girls Elite | 2024 | League1 British Columbia | 11 | 8 | 2 | 2 | — | | 5 | 0 | 2 (Note: Appearance(s) in Women's Inter-Provincial Championship) | 2 | 20 | 12 |
| Whitecaps FC Girls Elite | Total | | 15 | 13 | 4 | 5 | 0 | 0 | 5 | 0 | 2 | 2 | 26 | 20 |
| AFC Toronto | 2025 | Northern Super League | 21 | 14 | 3 | 2 | – | | – | | – | | 24 | 16 |
| AFC Toronto | 2026 | Northern Super League | 22 | 11 | 0 | 0 | – | | – | | – | | 22 | 11 |
| AFC Toronto | Total | | 43 | 25 | 3 | 2 | 0 | 0 | 0 | 0 | 0 | 0 | 46 | 27 |
| Career total | | | 58 | 38 | 7 | 7 | 0 | 0 | 5 | 0 | 2 | 2 | 72 | 47 |

=== International ===
As of match played October 12, 2026

Appearances and goals by national team and year
| National team | Year | Apps | Goals |
|---|---|---|---|
| Canada | 2026 | 4 | 0 |
| Total | | 4 | 0 |

== Honours ==
Canada

- CONCACAF Women's U-20 Championship: 2025

AFC Toronto

- Northern Super League Supporters' Shield: 2025
- Diana B. Matheson Cup: 2026

Individual

- Northern Super League Rookie of the Year: 2025
- Northern Super League Team of the Season: 2025
