= April Lantaigne =

Canadian soccer player (born 2006)

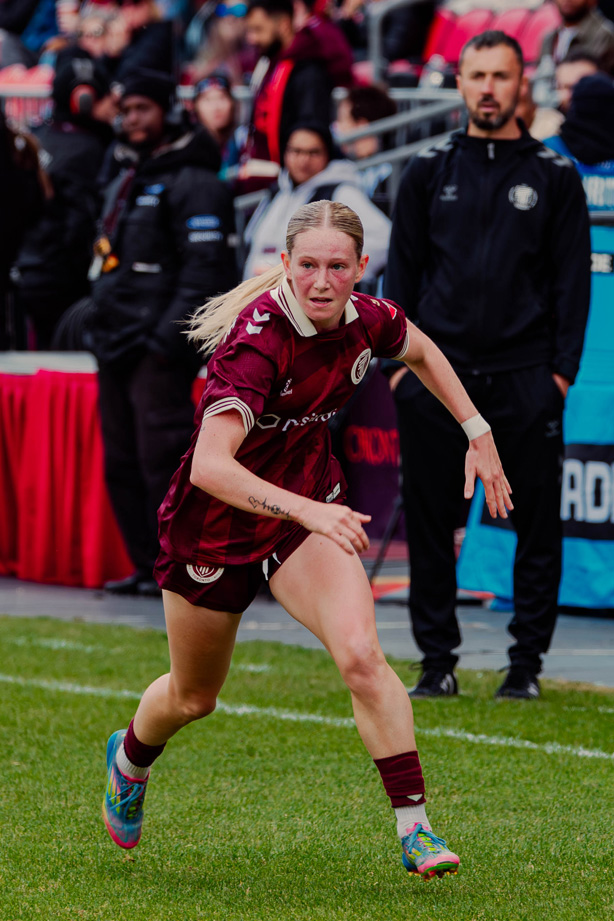
- Lantaigne with AFC Toronto in 2026

Personal information
- Full name: April Stephanie Lantaigne
- Date of birth: April 21, 2006 (age 20)
- Place of birth: Ajax, Ontario, Canada
- Height: 5 ft 4 in (1.63 m)
- Positions: Left midfielder; left back

Team information
- Current team: AFC Toronto
- Number: 2

Youth career
- Whitby FC
- NDC Ontario

College career
Years	Team	Apps	(Gls)
2024	South Alabama Jaguars	19	(2)

Senior career*
Years	Team	Apps	(Gls)
2023–2024	NDC Ontario	27	(15)
2025–	AFC Toronto	28	(0)

International career
2025–2026	Canada U-20		
- * Club domestic league appearances and goals as of October 28, 2026

April Stephanie Lantaigne (born April 21, 2006) is a Canadian soccer player who plays as a midfielder for AFC Toronto in the Northern Super League. She is a left-footed, left-sided player who has also been used in multiple wide positions.

A youth product of Whitby FC and NDC Ontario, Lantaigne played senior soccer in the League1 Ontario Women's Premier Division while also playing college soccer for the South Alabama Jaguars during the 2024 NCAA season. She helped NDC Ontario win the regular-season title in 2023 and 2024 and was named a finalist for the division's Most Valuable Player award. She signed with AFC Toronto in January 2025, winning inaugural Northern Super League Supporters' Shield in her first season.

Lantaigne represented Canada at under-20 level at the 2025 CONCACAF Women's U-20 Championship, where they won the tournament and qualified for the 2026 FIFA U-20 Women's World Cup in Poland.

== Early life ==
Lantaigne was born in Ajax, Ontario, and grew up in nearby Whitby, Ontario. She is the daughter of Chris and Christine Lantaigne and the seventh of eight siblings.

She began playing soccer with Whitby FC before joining the National Development Centre Ontario (NDC Ontario). She played in the Ontario Player Development League (OPDL), including a season against under-14 boys' teams, and represented Ontario at the provincial level in 2022.

Lantaigne attended Brooklin High School in 2022, where she played on the school's soccer team that reached the bronze-medal final. She later graduated from Bill Crothers Secondary School in Markham, Ontario, where she played soccer for two years.

== College career ==
=== South Alabama Jaguars ===
Lantaigne joined the South Alabama Jaguars for the 2024 NCAA Division I season. She was listed as a midfielder and made her collegiate debut on August 15, entering as a substitute in South Alabama's 3–0 defeat to LSU.

On August 22, Lantaigne scored her first collegiate goal in South Alabama's 2–0 victory over Louisiana Tech. She opened the scoring in the sixth minute after receiving an assist from Irene Campo.

Lantaigne made her first start of the season on September 12 against Middle Tennessee. She played 70 minutes and recorded three shots in South Alabama's 4–1 victory.

On October 10, Lantaigne scored and provided an assist in South Alabama's 3–0 victory over Louisiana. She opened the scoring in the 11th minute and later assisted Irene Campo's goal in the 81st minute. She played 73 minutes and recorded three shots, including one on target.

On October 12, Lantaigne recorded another assist in South Alabama's 4–1 victory over Troy. She assisted Bonnie Frost's goal and played 88 minutes.

South Alabama finished first in the western division of the Sun Belt Conference. The Jaguars advanced to the quarter-finals of the 2024 Sun Belt Women's Soccer Championship, where they lost 2–1 to Coastal Carolina.

Lantaigne finished her freshman season having started all 19 matches. She recorded two goals, six assists, two game-winning goals, 29 shots and 10 shots on target in 1,337 minutes. Her six assists tied her for the team lead.

Following the 2024 season, Lantaigne left South Alabama and signed with AFC Toronto ahead of the club's inaugural season in the Northern Super League. She ended her college career after one season.

== Club career ==
=== NDC Ontario ===
Lantaigne played for NDC Ontario in the Women's Premier Division of League1 Ontario during the 2023 and 2024 seasons. She was part of the NDC Ontario team that won the 2023 regular-season title and finished as playoff runner-up.

In 2024, NDC Ontario again won the regular-season title, finishing first in the division's standings. Lantaigne led the team with 11 goals in 16 league appearances and was named a finalist for the division's Most Valuable Player award.

=== AFC Toronto ===
On January 22, 2025, Lantaigne signed her first professional contract with AFC Toronto ahead of the club's inaugural season in the Northern Super League. The signing formed part of AFC Toronto's recruitment of Canadian players from the local development system.

Lantaigne joined the club as a midfielder. She is left-footed and has been described as a versatile wide player capable of contributing in multiple positions.

Lantaigne made her professional debut on April 27, 2025, in AFC Toronto's 2–1 defeat to Ottawa Rapid FC. She entered the match in the 84th minute, replacing Shaina Ashouri.

She made another substitute appearance against Montréal Roses FC on May 22, entering in the 90th minute of AFC Toronto's 2–0 victory.

In June, Lantaigne joined Canada's under-20 national team for the 2025 CONCACAF Women's U-20 Championship. She returned to AFC Toronto after Canada won the tournament.

On October 4, 2025, Lantaigne made her first professional start in AFC Toronto's 2–1 victory over Calgary Wild FC. She was one of four AFC Toronto players making their first Northern Super League starts.

AFC Toronto finished first in the regular-season standings during its inaugural campaign and won the first Northern Super League Supporters' Shield. Lantaigne made 10 appearances and two starts during the season, recording seven shots.

On December 17, 2025, AFC Toronto announced that it had exercised its club option on Lantaigne's contract for the 2026 season.

On October 4, 2026, Lantaigne delivered the corner kick that led to AFC Toronto's winning goal in a 2–1 extra-time victory over Vancouver Rise FC in the quarter-finals of the 2026–27 W Canadian Championship. Her delivery was headed on by Shelina Zadorsky before Kaylee Hunter redirected the ball into the net in the 100th minute, sending AFC Toronto through to the semi-finals.

== International career ==
Lantaigne was selected for Canada's under-20 team for the 2025 CONCACAF Women's Under-20 Qualifiers, held in Trinidad and Tobago from February 20 to 25, 2025. She was named as a defender in the squad.

Lantaigne appeared as a substitute in Canada's qualifying matches against Dominica and Trinidad and Tobago. Canada won the matches 22–0 and 12–0, respectively. Canada won all three of its matches and finished first in Group E, securing qualification for the championship tournament.

Canada advanced to the 2025 CONCACAF Women's U-20 Championship, held in Costa Rica. Lantaigne was included in Canada's squad for the tournament as a defender. On June 2, Lantaigne entered Canada's 4–2 group-stage defeat against Mexico as a substitute, replacing Sienna Gibson. Canada defeated Mexico 3–2 after extra time in the final to win the tournament. The victory secured Canada's qualification for the 2026 FIFA U-20 Women's World Cup in Poland.

== Career statistics ==
As of October 28, 2026

Club	Season	League			Playoffs		Domestic Cup		League Cup		Other		Total	
Club	Season	Division	Apps	Goals	Apps	Goals	Apps	Goals	Apps	Goals	Apps	Goals	Apps	Goals
NDC Ontario	2023	League1 Ontario	11	4	2	0	—		—		—		13	4
NDC Ontario	2024	League1 Ontario	16	11	—		—		1	0	0	0	17	11
NDC Ontario	Total		27	15	2	0	0	0	1	0	0	0	30	15
AFC Toronto	2025	Northern Super League	9	0	1	0	–		–		–		10	0
AFC Toronto	2026	Northern Super League	19	0	0	0	–		–		–		19	0
AFC Toronto	Total		28	0	1	0	0	0	0	0	0	0	29	0
Career total			55	15	3	0	0	0	1	0	0	0	59	15

== Honours ==
=== NDC Ontario ===
- League1 Ontario Women's Premier Division:
  - Regular-season champion: 2023, 2024

=== AFC Toronto ===
- Northern Super League Supporters' Shield: 2025

=== Canada U-20 ===
- CONCACAF Women's U-20 Championship: 2025

=== Individual ===
- League1 Ontario Women's Premier Division Second Team All-Star: 2024
- League1 Ontario Women's Premier Division Most Valuable Player finalist: 2024
