= AFCT =

AFCT may refer to:

- A.F.C. Totton, an English football team
- AFC Toronto, a Canadian women's soccer team
