= Marko Milanović =

Marko Milanović may refer to:

- Marko Milanović (professor), law professor
- Marko Milanović (soccer), soccer coach
