= 2026 Northern Super League final =

Final match of a women's Canadian soccer league play-offs

- Event: 2026 Northern Super League season
Montreal Roses	AFC Toronto
0	1
- Date: November 14, 2026
- Venue: TD Place Stadium, Ottawa, Ontario
- Player of the Match: Olivia Chisholm
- Referee: Carly Shaw-MacLaren
- Attendance: 7,393
- Weather: Cloudy; 6 °C (43 °F); 70% humidity

The 2026 Northern Super League final was the second edition of the championship match of the Northern Super League (NSL), held to determine the winner of the 2026 Northern Super League season. It was played on November 14, 2026, at TD Place Stadium in Ottawa, Ontario between Montreal Roses and AFC Toronto.

== Path to the final ==
The 2026 NSL season was contested by six teams. Each team played five games against each of the five opponents for a total of 25 matches. The top four teams from the regular season qualified for the play-offs, which began on October 31, featuring two-leg semifinals followed by a single match final.

=== Regular season standings ===
Pos	Team	Pld	W	D	L	GF	GA	GD	Pts	Playoff qualification
1	Montreal Roses (S)	25	12	9	4	43	27	+16	45	Advance to play-offs
2	Ottawa Rapid	25	12	4	9	49	44	+5	40	Advance to play-offs
3	AFC Toronto	25	10	9	6	38	24	+14	39	Advance to play-offs
4	Vancouver Rise	25	9	4	12	47	55	−8	31	Advance to play-offs
5	Halifax Tides	25	7	8	10	24	24	0	29	
6	Calgary Wild	25	5	6	14	28	55	−27	21	

Source: NSL
Rules for classification: 1) Points 2) Head-to-head points; 3) Head-to-head goal difference; 4) Goal difference; 5) Wins; 6) Goals scored; 7) Goals conceded; 8) Least red cards; 9) Least yellow cards; 10) Drawing of lots.
(S) Supporters' Shield winner

=== Play-off bracket ===
Semi-finals two-legged tie
1	Montreal Roses	3	2	5
4	Vancouver Rise	0	2	2
2	Ottawa Rapid	2	0	2
3	AFC Toronto	4	4	8

Final single match
November 14 – Ottawa
1	Montreal Roses	0
3	AFC Toronto	1

== Background ==
=== Montreal Roses FC ===
This was Montreal's first NSL final appearance in its two seasons of play.

=== AFC Toronto ===
This was Toronto's second consecutive NSL final appearance in its two seasons of play, having lost to Vancouver Rise in the previous year's final.

=== Head-to-head ===
In the 2026 regular season, Montreal defeated Toronto twice (1–0 on May 10 and 2–0 on August 16), Toronto defeated Montreal once (2–0 on July 23), and the teams tied twice (1–1 on June 13 and 2–2 on September 10). This was the second time that the teams meet in a postseason, after Toronto defeated Montreal in the semi-finals the previous year.

== Venue ==
The game was held at TD Place Stadium in Ottawa, Ontario, the home stadium of the NSL's Ottawa Rapid FC, as well as Atlético Ottawa of the Canadian Premier League (CPL), the Ottawa Redblacks of the Canadian Football League (CFL), and the University of Ottawa Gee-Gees football team.

== Broadcasting ==
In Canada, the game was televised on CBC and TSN in English, and on RDS in French, with pre-game and post-game coverage. In the United States, it was on ESPN+. Worldwide, it was streamed on the NSL's YouTube channel.

== Match ==
=== Details ===
November 14
2:00 pm EST

Montreal Roses	0–1	AFC Toronto
	Report	Chisholm 39'

TD Place Stadium, Ottawa, Ontario
Attendance: 7,393
Referee: Carly Shaw-MacLaren
