= Ivymae Perez =

Filipino footballer (born 2001)

Personal information
- Date of birth: July 16, 2001 (age 25)
- Place of birth: Manila, Philippines
- Height: 5 ft 4 in (1.63 m)
- Position: Midfielder

Youth career
- Markham SC
- North Toronto Nitros

College career
Years	Team	Apps	(Gls)
2019	South Florida Bulls	1	(0)
2021–2023	TMU Bold (Note: Ryerson University changed its name to Toronto Metropolitan University in 2022)	26	(10)

Senior career*
Years	Team	Apps	(Gls)
2021–2022	Blue Devils FC	7	(0)
2023–2024	North Toronto Nitros	31	(7)
2025	AFC Toronto	1	(0)
2026–	North Toronto Nitros	2	(0)
- * Club domestic league appearances and goals as of July 31, 2026

Ivymae Perez (born July 16, 2001) is a Filipino footballer who plays for the North Toronto Nitros in the Ontario Premier League.

== Early life ==
Perez was born in the Philippines, but moved to Toronto, Canada as a child, where she grew up. She played youth soccer with Markham SC and the North Toronto Nitros, as well as playing for the Ontario provincial team.

== University career ==
In 2019, Perez began attending the University of South Florida, where she played for the women's soccer team. She was named to the AAC All-Academic Team.

In 2020, Perez returned to Canada to attend Ryerson University (later renamed Toronto Metropolitan University) to play for the women's soccer team (her debut was delayed to 2021 as the 2020 season was cancelled due to the COVID-19 pandemic. On September 4, 2022, she scored the team's first goal under the new TMU Bold branding, following their renaming from the Ryerson Rams. In 2022, she was named an OUA East Second Team All-Star.

In 2024, after graduating from TMU, she was set to begin attending Humber College and play for the women's soccer team, but instead reversed her decision as she found a job with the Peel Regional Police.

== Club career ==
From 2021 to 2022, she played with Blue Devils FC in League1 Ontario.

From 2023 to 2024, she played with the North Toronto Nitros in League1 Ontario.

In January 2025, she signed with AFC Toronto in the Northern Super League. In August 2025, she agreed to a mutual termination of her contract with the club, in order to pursue a career outside of football.

== International career ==
In February 2025, she was called up to a training camp with the Philippines national team for the first time.

== Career statistics ==
As of August 8, 2026

Club	Season	League			Playoffs		Domestic Cup		Other		Total	
Club	Season	Division	Apps	Goals	Apps	Goals	Apps	Goals	Apps	Goals	Apps	Goals
Blue Devils FC	2021	League1 Ontario	2	0	0	0	—		—		2	0
Blue Devils FC	2022	League1 Ontario	5	0	—		—		—		5	0
Blue Devils FC	Total		7	0	0	0	0	0	0	0	7	0
North Toronto Nitros	2023	League1 Ontario	16	4	0	0	—		—		16	4
North Toronto Nitros	2024	League1 Ontario Premier	15	3	—		—		3 (Note: Appearances in L1 Cup)	1	18	4
North Toronto Nitros	Total		31	7	0	0	0	0	3	1	34	8
AFC Toronto	2025	Northern Super League	1	0	0	0	—		—		1	0
North Toronto Nitros	2026	Ontario Premier League	2	0	—		—		1 (Note: Appearance in promotion/relegation playoffs)	0	3	0
Career total			41	7	0	0	0	0	4	1	45	8
