= Jasmine Vilgrain =

Haitian footballer

Personal information
- Date of birth: 25 July 2002 (age 24)
- Place of birth: New York City, New York, United States
- Height: 1.72 m (5 ft 8 in)
- Positions: Defender; midfielder

Team information
- Current team: AFC Toronto
- Number: 23

Youth career
- North Toronto Nitros
- NDC Ontario

College career
Years	Team	Apps	(Gls)
2021	SMU Mustangs		

Senior career*
Years	Team	Apps	(Gls)
2019	DeRo United FC	13	(2)
2022	Blue Devils FC	6	(1)
2023–2024	Lyon B		
2024	Lyon	1	(0)
2024–2025	Rodez	6	(1)
2025–2026	Stade de Reims	20	(1)
2026–	AFC Toronto	0	(0)

International career^{‡}
2024–	Haiti	5	(0)
- * Club domestic league appearances and goals as of October 13, 2026 ‡ National team caps and goals as of 13 October 2026

Jasmine Vilgrain (born July 25, 2002) is a footballer who plays for AFC Toronto in the Northern Super League. Born in the United States and raised in Canada, she represents Haiti at international level.

== Early life ==
Vilgrain was born in the United States, before moving to Canada at age five. She began playing youth soccer at age five with the North Toronto Nitros, before later joining the NDC Ontario program.

== College career ==
In 2020, Vilgrain began attending Ohio State University, where she was announced as a member of the women's soccer team, but ultimately did not play.

In 2021, she began attending Southern Methodist University, where she joined the women's soccer team.

== Club career ==
In 2019, Vilgrain played with DeRo United FC in League1 Ontario. She was named a league Second Team All-Star at the end of the season. In 2022, she played with Blue Devils FC.

In 2023, she signed with French club Lyon. She played with the second team in Division 3 Féminine, serving as team captain, before making her first team debut in the Première Ligue on May 8, 2024 against Bordeaux.

In July 2024, she signed with Rodez in the Seconde Ligue on a one-year contract. She scored her first goal on 29 September against Thonon Evian.

In September 2025, she signed with Stade de Reims in the Seconde Ligue.

In September 2026, she signed with Northern Super League club AFC Toronto for the remainder of the 2026 season.

== International career ==
In 2017, Vilgrain attended a camp with the Canada U17 team.

In February 2024, she was called up to the Haiti national team for the first time, for the 2024 CONCACAF W Gold Cup qualification playoffs, but withdrew due to injury. She was then called up for their next match in November 2024, starting in the first match of the 2024 Pink Ladies Cup on 23 October 2024 against Jordan.
