= Sarah Rollins =

Canadian soccer player (born 2005)

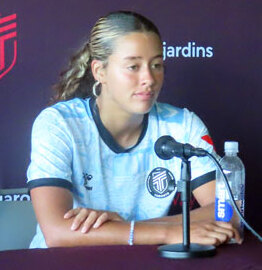
- Rollins in 2025

Personal information
- Date of birth: March 15, 2005 (age 21)
- Place of birth: Toronto, Ontario, Canada
- Height: 5 ft 11 in (1.80 m)
- Position: Defender

Team information
- Current team: AFC Toronto
- Number: 14

Youth career
- North Toronto Nitros

College career
Years	Team	Apps	(Gls)
2023–2024	UBC Thunderbirds	23	(2)

Senior career*
Years	Team	Apps	(Gls)
2022–2024	North Toronto Nitros	36	(2)
2024	→ North Toronto Nitros B	1	(0)
2025–	AFC Toronto	44	(1)
- * Club domestic league appearances and goals as of October 20, 2025

Sarah Rollins (born March 15, 2005) is a Canadian soccer player who plays for AFC Toronto in the Northern Super League.

== University career ==
In 2023, Rollins began attending the University of British Columbia, where she played for the women's soccer team. On September 8, 2023, she scored her first goal in a victory over the UBC Okanagan Heat. At the end of the 2023 season, she was named the Canada West Rookie of the Year, Canada West Defender of the Year, and named a Canada West First Team All-Star. In addition, she was named the U Sports Rookie of the Year and a First Team All-Canadian. She won national titles in both her seasons with UBC and was named a tournament All-Star at the 2024 U Sports Championship.

== Club career ==
From 2022 to 2024, she played with the North Toronto Nitros in League1 Ontario. In 2022, she was named to the league U18 All-Star Team. In 2023, she was named a league Second Team All-Star. In 2024, she was named a league First Team All-Star.

In January 2025, she signed with AFC Toronto in the Northern Super League. She made her debut on May 17, 2025 against the Halifax Tides, earning league Rookie of the Week honours. On August 1, 2026, she scored her first goal, in a victory over Calgary Wild FC. In October 2026, she extended her contract through 2028.

== Career statistics ==
As of October 28, 2026

Club	Season	League			Playoffs		Domestic Cup		Other		Total	
Club	Season	Division	Apps	Goals	Apps	Goals	Apps	Goals	Apps	Goals	Apps	Goals
North Toronto Nitros	2022	League1 Ontario	14	1	—		—		—		14	1
North Toronto Nitros	2023	League1 Ontario	14	1	0	0	—		—		14	1
North Toronto Nitros	2024	League1 Ontario Premier	8	0	—		—		2	0	10	0
North Toronto Nitros	Total		36	2	0	0	0	0	2	0	38	2
North Toronto Nitros B	2024	League2 Ontario	1	0	—		—		—		1	0
AFC Toronto	2025	Northern Super League	19	0	3	0	–		–		22	0
AFC Toronto	2026	Northern Super League	25	1	0	0	–		–		25	1
AFC Toronto	Total		44	1	3	0	0	0	0	0	47	1
Career total			81	3	3	0	0	0	2	0	86	3
