= Sierra Cota-Yarde =

Portuguese footballer (born 2003)

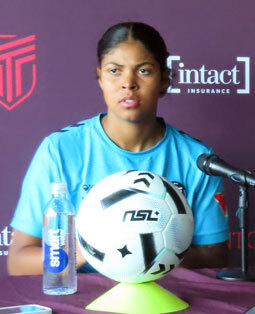
- Cota-Yarde in 2025

Personal information
- Full name: Sierra Deolinda Cota-Yarde
- Date of birth: 4 July 2003 (age 23)
- Place of birth: Toronto, Ontario, Canada
- Height: 1.80 m (5 ft 11 in)
- Position: Goalkeeper

Team information
- Current team: AFC Toronto
- Number: 13

Youth career
- SC Toronto
- Benfica Toronto
- North Toronto Nitros

College career
Years	Team	Apps	(Gls)
2021	Prairie View A&M Lady Panthers	7	(0)
2022–2023	Arkansas Razorbacks	13	(0)
2024	SMU Mustangs	17	(0)

Senior career*
Years	Team	Apps	(Gls)
2022–2024	North Toronto Nitros	8	(0)
2025–	AFC Toronto	16	(0)

International career^{‡}
2022	Portugal U19	3	(0)
2022–	Portugal U23	4	(0)
2024–	Portugal	1	(0)
- * Club domestic league appearances and goals as of October 28, 2026 ‡ National team caps and goals as of 27 February 2025

Sierra Deolinda Cota-Yarde (born 4 July 2003) is a footballer who plays as a goalkeeper for AFC Toronto in the Northern Super League. Born in Canada, she represents Portugal at international level.

== Early life ==
Cota-Yarde played youth soccer with SC Toronto, Benfica Toronto, and the North Toronto Nitros.

== College career ==
In 2021, Cota-Yarde began attending Prairie View A&M University, where she played for the women's soccer team. In September 2021, she was named the SWAC Goalkeeper of the Week in back-to-back weeks.

In 2022, she began attending the University of Arkansas. She was named to the Academic Honor Roll in 2022 and 2023 and also named to the SEC Community Service Team in 2023.

In 2024, she transferred to Southern Methodist University. She earned her first victory in the season opener on 15 August 2024, in a 3-0 victory over the Northwestern State Lady Demons

== Club career ==
From 2022 to 2024, she played with the North Toronto Nitros in League1 Ontario.

In January 2025, she signed with AFC Toronto in the Northern Super League. She made her debut on 11 May 2025 against Vancouver Rise FC. Following the conclusion of the 2025 season, in which AFC Toronto won the inaugural NSL Supporters' Shield, Cota-Yarde signed a contract extension through 2027.

== International career ==
Born in Canada, she is eligible to represent Canada and Portugal (where her mother was born).

She began her international career with the Portugal U19 team, making three appearances. She made her debut on 22 February 2022 against Austria.

In September 2023, she was called up to the Portugal senior team for the first time, ahead of a pair of UEFA Women's Nations League matches. She made her senior debut on 27 February 2024, as a late substitute, in a friendly against South Korea.

In June 2025, Cota-Yarde was called up to the Portugal squad for the UEFA Women's Euro 2025.

== Career statistics ==
As of October 28, 2026

Club	Season	League			Playoffs		Domestic Cup		Other		Total	
Club	Season	Division	Apps	Goals	Apps	Goals	Apps	Goals	Apps	Goals	Apps	Goals
North Toronto Nitros	2022	League1 Ontario	2	0	—		—		—		2	0
North Toronto Nitros	2023	League1 Ontario	5	0	0	0	—		—		5	0
North Toronto Nitros	2024	League1 Ontario Premier	1	0	—		—		0	0	1	0
North Toronto Nitros	Total		8	0	0	0	0	0	0	0	8	0
AFC Toronto	2025	Northern Super League	13	0	3	0	–		–		16	0
AFC Toronto	2026	Northern Super League	3	0	0	0	–		–		3	0
AFC Toronto	Total		3	0	0	0	0	0	0	0	3	0
Career total			24	0	3	0	0	0	0	0	27	0
