= Linda Owusu Ansah =

Ghanaian footballer (born 2006)

Personal information
- Date of birth: 3 July 2006 (age 20)
- Place of birth: Kumasi, Ghana
- Position: Midfielder

Team information
- Current team: AFC Toronto
- Number: 53

Senior career*
| Years | Team | Apps | (Gls) |
| 2021–2023 | Supreme Ladies FC | 35 | (15) |
| 2023–2026 | Ampem Darkoa Ladies FC | 30 | (11) |
| 2026– | AFC Toronto | 5 | (0) |

International career
- Ghana U15
| | Ghana U20 | 10 | (3) |
- * Club domestic league appearances and goals as of 28 October 2026

Linda Owusu Ansah (born 3 July 2006) is a Ghanaian professional footballer who plays as a forward for Canadian Northern Super League club AFC Toronto.

== Club career ==
From 2021 to 2023, Owusu Ansah played with Supreme Ladies FC in the Ghana Women's Premier League, before joining Ampem Darkoa Ladies FC. In 2023, she played in the CAF Women's Champions League with Ampem Darkoa.

In May 2026, she signed with Canadian Northern Super League club AFC Toronto, on a two-year contract, with an option for a further season.

== International career ==
Owusu Ansah has played with the Ghana U15 and Ghana U20 youth teams. She served as team captain with the U20s. On 9 May 2026, at the 2026 African U-20 Women's World Cup qualification, she scored the decisive goal, in the 78th minute on a direct free kick near the corner, to defeat Uganda U20 3-2 on aggregate, to earn qualification for the 2026 FIFA U-20 Women's World Cup.

== Career statistics ==
As of 28 October 2026

| Club | Season | League | | | Playoffs | | Domestic Cup | | Continental | | Total | |
| Club | Season | Division | Apps | Goals | Apps | Goals | Apps | Goals | Apps | Goals | Apps | Goals |
|---|---|---|---|---|---|---|---|---|---|---|---|---|
| Supreme Ladies FC | 2021–22 | Ghana Women's Premier League | 18 | 5 | — | | — | | — | | 18 | 5 |
| Supreme Ladies FC | 2022–23 | Ghana Women's Premier League | 17 | 10 | — | | — | | — | | 17 | 10 |
| Supreme Ladies FC | Total | | 35 | 15 | 0 | 0 | 0 | 0 | 0 | 0 | 35 | 15 |
| Ampem Darkoa Ladies FC | 2023–24 | Ghana Women's Premier League | 2 | 1 | — | | — | | 4 | 0 | 6 | 1 |
| Ampem Darkoa Ladies FC | 2024–25 | Ghana Women's Premier League | 19 | 5 | — | | — | | — | | 19 | 5 |
| Ampem Darkoa Ladies FC | 2025–26 | Ghana Women's Premier League | 9 | 5 | — | | — | | — | | 9 | 5 |
| Ampem Darkoa Ladies FC | Total | | 30 | 11 | 0 | 0 | 0 | 0 | 4 | 0 | 34 | 11 |
| AFC Toronto | 2026 | Northern Super League | 5 | 0 | 0 | 0 | — | | — | | 5 | 0 |
| Career total | | | 70 | 26 | 0 | 0 | 0 | 0 | 4 | 0 | 74 | 26 |
