= Kaila Novak =

Canadian soccer player (born 2002)

Personal information
- Full name: Kaila Lillyanna Novak
- Date of birth: March 24, 2002 (age 24)
- Place of birth: London, Ontario, Canada
- Height: 5 ft 6 in (1.68 m)
- Position: Forward

Team information
- Current team: AFC Toronto
- Number: 15

Youth career
- St. Thomas SC
- FC London
- Ontario REX

College career
Years	Team	Apps	(Gls)
2020–2023	UCLA Bruins		

Senior career*
Years	Team	Apps	(Gls)
2016–2017	FC London	12	(8)
2024–2025	Durham	18	(1)
2025–	AFC Toronto	14	(2)

International career^{‡}
2017–2018	Canada U17	14	(2)
2020–2022	Canada U20	14	(5)
- * Club domestic league appearances and goals as of October 27, 2026 ‡ National team caps and goals as of August 17, 2022

Kaila Lillyanna "Kai" Novak (born March 24, 2002) is a Canadian soccer player who plays for AFC Toronto in the Northern Super League.

== Early life ==
Novak was born in Canada, to a Czech father and an English mother. She began playing youth soccer at age four with St. Thomas SC. She later played with FC London. She later joined the Ontario REX program.

== College career ==
In 2020, Novak began attending the University of California, Los Angeles, where she played for the women's soccer team. On March 26, 2021, she scored her first collegiate goal in a 2-1 loss to the Arizona State Sun Devils. After her first season, she was named to the Pac-12 Conference All-Freshman Team. She was named to the Academic Honour Roll for both her seasons. She opted out of playing soccer for her senior season.

== Club career ==
In 2016, she began playing with FC London in League1 Ontario.

In August 2024, Novak signed with English club Durham in the Women's Championship. She scored her first goal against the Blackburn Rovers. She departed the club following the conclusion of the 2024-25 season, having scored 3 goals across 24 appearances for the club. Following her departure from Durham, she spent time training with London City Lionesses, Crystal Palace FC, and Angel City FC, also playing in the 7v7 The Soccer Tournament 2025 with Angel City 7s in 2025.

In September 2025, she signed with Northern Super League club AFC Toronto. She made her first start for the club in a 2-1 win over Calgary Wild FC on October 4, 2025, providing the assist for Toronto's first goal, and receiving a red card in the 62nd minute. On January 15, 2026, it was announced that she had signed a contract extension to keep her with Toronto through 2026.

== International career ==
In June 2017, she was called up to the Canadian national program for the first time, for a camp with the Canada U17 team. The following month, she was named to the roster for a Four Nations tournament in China, where she appeared in all three matches. In April 2018, she was named to the roster for the 2018 CONCACAF Women's U-17 Championship. She scored two goals in the first match in a 3-0 victory over Bermuda U17. However, after the first two matches of the tournament, the tournament was suspended due to riots in Nicaragua, with her later returning to the squad for the remainder of the tournament in June in the United States, ultimately winning a bronze medal. Afterwards, she played with the squad at the 2018 FIFA U-17 Women's World Cup.

In July 2019, Novak was named to the Canada U20 team for a series of three friendly matches in England. She was then named to the roster for the 2022 CONCACAF Women's U-20 Championship (winning bronze) and the 2022 FIFA U-20 Women's World Cup.

== Personal life ==
In 2020, Novak began posting videos on TikTok, during the COVID-19 pandemic while at UCLA reviewing food. She quickly amassed over a million followers. She became the 2nd most followed female soccer athlete on the app.

== Career statistics ==
As of October 28, 2026

Club	Season	League			Playoffs		Domestic Cup		League Cup		Total	
Club	Season	Division	Apps	Goals	Apps	Goals	Apps	Goals	Apps	Goals	Apps	Goals
FC London	2016	League1 Ontario	2	1	—		—		0	0	2	1
FC London	2017	League1 Ontario	10	7	—		—		?	1	11+	8
FC London	Total		12	8	0	0	0	0	1+	1	13+	9
Durham	2024–25	Women's Championship	18	1	—		2	0	4	2	24	3
AFC Toronto	2025	Northern Super League	1	0	0	0	–		–		1	0
AFC Toronto	2026	Northern Super League	13	2	0	0	–		–		13	2
AFC Toronto	Total		14	2	0	0	0	0	0	0	14	2
Career total			44	11	0	0	2	0	5+	3	51+	14
