= Olivia Chisholm =

Canadian soccer player (born 2008)

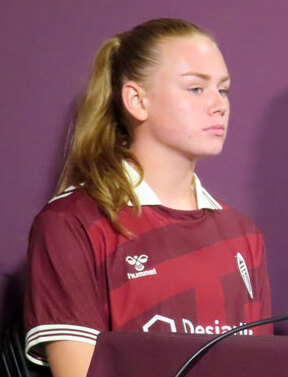
- Chisholm in 2026

Personal information
- Full name: Olivia James Chisholm
- Date of birth: December 5, 2008 (age 17)
- Place of birth: Toronto, Ontario, Canada
- Height: 1.64 m (5 ft 4 1/2 in)
- Position: Midfielder

Team information
- Current team: AFC Toronto

Youth career
- North Toronto Nitros
- NDC Ontario

Senior career*
Years	Team	Apps	(Gls)
2024–2025	NDC Ontario	27	(4)
2025	→ AFC Toronto (loan)	2	(0)
2026–	AFC Toronto	20	(0)

International career^{‡}
2023–2025	Canada U17	13	(3)
2025–	Canada U20	3	(0)
- * Club domestic league appearances and goals as of October 28, 2026 ‡ National team caps and goals as of November 1, 2025

Olivia James Chisholm (born December 5, 2008) is a Canadian soccer player who plays for Northern Super League club AFC Toronto.

== Early life ==
Chisholm began playing youth soccer at age four with the North Toronto Nitros.

== Club career ==
Chisholm began playing with NDC Ontario in League1 Ontario in 2024. She won the league title with the side in 2024 and in 2025, she was named a League 1 Ontario Second Team All-Star. On August 30, 2025, she signed a developmental contract with Northern Super League club AFC Toronto, making her professional debut the same day, in a substitute appearance against Calgary Wild FC, becoming the youngest player to play for the club. She made her first start on October 4, 2025, also against Calgary.

In January 2026, she signed her first professional contract with AFC Toronto.

== International career ==
In August 2023, Chisholm was named to the Canada U17 for the 2023 CONCACAF Women's U-20 Championship qualification tournament. In May 2025, she was named to the Canada U20 roster for the 2025 CONCACAF Women's U-20 Championship, helping them win the title. In October 2025, she was named to the Canada U17 roster for the 2025 FIFA U-17 Women's World Cup.

At the end of 2025, she was named the Canada Soccer Young Player of the Year.

== Career statistics ==
As of October 28, 2026

Club	Season	League			Playoffs		Domestic Cup		League Cup		Other		Total	
Club	Season	Division	Apps	Goals	Apps	Goals	Apps	Goals	Apps	Goals	Apps	Goals	Apps	Goals
NDC Ontario	2024	League1 Ontario	17	2	—		—		1	0	2	0	20	2
NDC Ontario	2025	League1 Ontario	10	2	—		—		0	0	—		10	2
NDC Ontario	Total		27	4	0	0	0	0	1	0	2	0	30	4
AFC Toronto (loan)	2025	Northern Super League	2	0	0	0	—		—		—		2	0
AFC Toronto	2026	Northern Super League	20	0	0	0	—		—		—		20	0
Career total			49	4	0	0	0	0	1	0	2	0	52	4
