= Zoe Hasenauer =

American soccer player (born 2000)

- Hasenauer in 2026

Personal information
- Full name: Zoe Margaret Hasenauer
- Date of birth: January 13, 2000 (age 26)
- Place of birth: Simi Valley, California, U.S.
- Height: 5 ft 6 in (1.68 m)
- Position: Midfielder

Team information
- Current team: AFC Toronto
- Number: 20

Youth career
- Eagles SC
- Real So Cal

College career
Years	Team	Apps	(Gls)
2018–2022	Oregon Ducks	92	(11)

Senior career*
Years	Team	Apps	(Gls)
2023–2025	Odense Boldklub Q	33	(9)
2025–2026	1. FC Köln II	7	(2)
2025–2026	1. FC Köln	9	(0)
2026–	AFC Toronto	7	(0)
- * Club domestic league appearances and goals as of October 28, 2026

Zoe Margaret Hasenauer (born January 13, 2000) is an American professional soccer player who plays as a midfielder for Northern Super League club AFC Toronto. She played college soccer for the Oregon Ducks, where she set program records for starts and assists. She has previously been a member of Danish Women's League club Odense Boldklub Q and Frauen-Bundesliga club 1. FC Köln.

== Early life ==
Hasenauer was born and raised in Simi Valley, California, as one of four daughters to Kim and John Hasenauer. Two of her three sisters both played soccer collegiately, while the third died due to a blood disorder before Hasenauer was born. Hasenauer started playing AYSO soccer at age 5 before joining Eagles SC and finally ending up at Real So Cal. She won the 2016/17 U-16 West Coast tournament with Real So Cal and was the club's top scorer the following year.

With Royal High School, Hasenauer was responsible for 58 goals and 27 assists across four years of play. She was named the Los Tacos Tournament and league MVP as a sophomore after guiding Royal High to a CIF Southern semifinal run. Hasenauer was also a three-time All-CIF Southern honoree.

== College career ==
Multiple universities, including USC and Stanford, attempted to recruit Hasenauer. However, she ultimately elected to ply her trade with the Oregon Ducks. As a freshman, she played in all 19 of Oregon's games, starting all but one. Her 5 assists was a team-best, and she was subsequently named to the Pac-12 All-Freshman team. Over the next two seasons, Hasenauer started every single match. She demonstrated a propensity to shoot on a frequent basis, ranking seventh in the Pac-12 in shots as a sophomore. On August 30, 2019, she fell one shot short of tying Oregon's record, peppering Portland State's goal with 10 attempts in a 4–2 victory over the Vikings. Hasenauer's quick trigger paid off, as she scored her first collegiate goal in the win. In the postponed 2020 season, she received recognition on the All-Pac-12 Third Team, her second-ever conference award.

Hasenauer kicked off her senior season with a bang, registering a goal contribution in all 6 opening games. Her streak was capped off by a Pac-12 Player of the Week honor in mid-September 2021. At the conclusion of the season, she was named to the All-Pacific Region Second Team for her performances. Hasenauer then played in a fifth year with Oregon, taking advantage of the extra season of NCAA eligibility offered to athletes due to the COVID-19 pandemic. She started all 19 matches, ranking third on the team in minutes played. She led the team in assists and broke the Ducks' program record for assists in a career. Hasenauer made history in several other statistical categories, including setting the record for most games started and tying the record for most total appearances.

== Club career ==
Hasenauer registered for the 2023 NWSL Draft, but she was not selected by any team. Instead, she moved overseas and signed her first professional contract with Danish Women's League club Odense Boldklub Q on July 25, 2023. She quickly made a positive impression on the team, scoring 6 goals and leading the team in scoring over the first few months of her stint with the club. On November 3, 2023, she signed a contract extension to keep her with OB Q for another 18 months. Hasenauer spent two years in Denmark before leaving the club in June 2025 to pursue other opportunities. She was responsible for over 25 goal contributions and was the team's top scorer in her second season.

On July 31, 2025, Hasenauer signed a two-year contract with German club 1. FC Köln. She picked up an injury before preseason and spent much of the first half of the season rehabilitating. She made her Frauen-Bundesliga debut on November 23, 2025, participating in a game against SV Werder Bremen that occurred during a blizzard; it was her first-ever experience playing a soccer match in the snow. In her first season in Germany, she made 16 appearances as a member of both Köln's first and second teams.

In September 2026, Hasenauer joined Canadian club AFC Toronto.

== International career ==
While playing collegiately for the Oregon Ducks in 2019, Hasenauer received her first youth international call-up. She joined the United States under-20 squad for two friendlies in Lakewood Ranch, Florida.
