= Mia Fontana =

American soccer player (born 2001)

Personal information
- Date of birth: June 19, 2001 (age 25)
- Place of birth: Burlingame, California, United States
- Height: 5 ft 6 in (1.68 m)
- Position: Midfielder

Team information
- Current team: AFC Toronto

Youth career
- San Jose Earthquakes

College career
Years	Team	Apps	(Gls)
2019–2025	California Golden Bears	74	(9)

Senior career*
Years	Team	Apps	(Gls)
2023–2024	San Francisco Glens	8	(4)
2026–	AFC Toronto	16	(0)

International career
2018	United States U17	3	(0)
2018	United States U19	2	(0)
- * Club domestic league appearances and goals as of October 28, 2026

Mia Fontana (born June 19, 2001) is an American soccer player who plays for AFC Toronto in the Northern Super League.

== Early life ==
Fontana played youth soccer with the San Jose Earthquakes Academy.

== College career ==
In 2019, Fontana began attending the University of California, Berkeley, where she played for the women's soccer team. She did not play in the 2019 season due to injury, taking a medical redshirt. On March 20, 2021, she scored her first goal in a 1-0 victory over the Stanford Cardinal. At the end of the 2023 season, she was named to the All-Pac 12 Third Team. She missed the entire 2024 season due to injury, before returning for the 2025 season. She was named to the Pac-12 Academic Honor Roll four times from 2020 to 2023 and was named to the Academic All-District Second Team in 2021.

== Club career ==
In March 2023, Fontana signed with the San Francisco Glens in the USL W League. She had trials with National Women's Soccer League clubs Chicago Red Stars in 2024 and the Utah Royals in 2026.

In April 2026, she signed a professional contract with AFC Toronto in the Northern Super League.

== International career ==
In 2018, Fontana was called up to the United States U17 and United States U18 teams. In October 2018, she was called up to the United States U19 for a series of friendlies.
