= Lauren Rowe =

Canadian soccer player (born 2004)

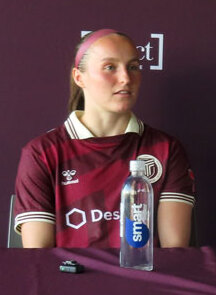
- Rowe in 2026

Personal information
- Full name: Lauren Erica Bridget Rowe
- Date of birth: July 3, 2004 (age 22)
- Place of birth: Conception Bay South, Newfoundland and Labrador, Canada
- Height: 5 ft 5 in (1.65 m)
- Position: Midfielder

Team information
- Current team: AFC Toronto
- Number: 77

Youth career
- Conception Bay South Strikers FC
- Feildians AA

College career
Years	Team	Apps	(Gls)
2023–2024	CBU Capers	21	(7)

Senior career*
Years	Team	Apps	(Gls)
2023–2024	FC London	35	(7)
2025	North Toronto Nitros	10	(7)
2025–	AFC Toronto	34	(9)
- * Club domestic league appearances and goals as of October 28, 2026

Lauren Erica Bridget Rowe (born July 3, 2004) is a Canadian soccer player who plays for AFC Toronto in the Northern Super League.

== Early life ==
Rowe began playing youth soccer at age three with Conception Bay South Strikers FC. She later played with Feildians AA. She also played with the Newfoundland and Labrador provincial team. In 2018, she went to a training camp with the Vancouver Whitecaps Academy, making five trips total over the next few years, as well as training with the Ontario REX program in 2021.

== University career ==
In 2022, Rowe began attending Cape Breton University, where she played for the women's soccer team. However, prior to her first season, she tore her ACL, delaying her first season to the following year. During the 2023 season, she broke her leg, causing her to miss the remainder of the season. At the end of the season, she won the school's Kathy Reid Memorial Award, which is awarded to a student-athlete who exemplifies the skill, perseverance and courage. In October 2024, she was named the school's Female Athlete of the Week. She was named an Academic All-Canadian in both 2023 and 2024. On October 27, 2024, she scored the winning goal in the Atlantic University Sport Championship final, earning player of the match honours.

== Club career ==
In 2023, Rowe began playing with FC London in League1 Ontario. In 2024, she won the League Cup with London.

In 2025, she joined the North Toronto Nitros in League1 Ontario.

On June 30, 2025, Rowe signed a professional contract with Northern Super League club AFC Toronto. On July 15, 2025, she made her debut in a substitute appearance and scored her first goal, netting the winning goal in a 1-0 victory over Halifax Tides FC. On January 15, 2026, it was announced that she had signed a contract extension to keep her with AFC Toronto through 2027.

== International career ==
In February 2022, Rowe was called up to the Canada U20 as a training player ahead of the 2022 CONCACAF Women's U-20 Championship.

== Career statistics ==
As of October 28, 2026

Club	Season	League			Playoffs		Domestic Cup		Other		Total	
Club	Season	Division	Apps	Goals	Apps	Goals	Apps	Goals	Apps	Goals	Apps	Goals
FC London	2023	League1 Ontario	17	2	1	0	—		—		18	2
FC London	2024	League1 Ontario Premier	18	5	—		—		4	1	22	6
FC London	Total		35	7	1	0	0	0	4	1	40	8
North Toronto Nitros	2025	League1 Ontario Premier	10	7	—		—		2	0	12	7
AFC Toronto	2025	Northern Super League	9	1	3	1	–		–		12	2
2026	25	8	0	0	–		–		25	8		
Total		34	9	3	1	0	0	0	0	37	10	
Career total			79	23	4	1	0	0	6	1	89	25
