= Ashley Cathro =

Canadian soccer player (born 2000)

- Cathro in 2025

Personal information
- Full name: Ashley Madison Cathro
- Date of birth: January 19, 2000 (age 26)
- Place of birth: Victoria, British Columbia, Canada
- Height: 5 ft 7 in (1.70 m)
- Position: Defender

Team information
- Current team: AFC Toronto
- Number: 19

Youth career
- Prospect Lake SC
- 2015–2018: Whitecaps FC Girls Elite

College career
| Years | Team | Apps | (Gls) |
| 2018–2023 | Illinois Fighting Illini | 78 | (0) |

Senior career*
| Years | Team | Apps | (Gls) |
| 2018 | TSS FC Rovers | | |
| 2019 | Vancouver Island FC | | |
| 2021 | San Antonio Athenians | | |
| 2022 | Racing Louisville FC B | 9 | (2) |
| 2025– | AFC Toronto | 31 | (0) |

International career^{‡}
| 2016-2017 | Canada U17 | 7 | (0) |
| 2019 | Canada U18 | 1 | (0) |
| 2018-2021 | Canada U20 | 4 | (0) |
- * Club domestic league appearances and goals as of October 28, 2026 ‡ National team caps and goals as of July 9, 2019

Ashley Madison Cathro (born January 19, 2000) is a Canadian soccer player who plays for AFC Toronto in the Northern Super League.

== Early life ==
Cathro began playing soccer at Prospect Lake SC, before later joining the Whitecaps FC Girls Elite and was named the 2016 BC Soccer Youth Player of the Year. In 2017, she played for Team British Columbia at the 2017 Canada Summer Games.

== College career ==
In 2018, Cathro began attending the University of Illinois Urbana-Champaign, where she played for the women's soccer team. On August 16, 2018, she made her collegiate debut, starting against the North Carolina Tar Heels. At the end of her first season, she was named to the Big Ten Conference All-Freshman Team. She redshirted the 2019 season, extending her eligibility another season. She was a four-time Academic All-Big Ten selection (2019 to 2022) and a Big Ten Distinguished Scholar in 2019-20. Cathro holds the team's record for the most Big Ten starts with 48.

At Illinois, she earned a Bachelor of Science in kinesiology and a Masters in Public Health. Afterwards, she then began a PhD in Community Health. She is published on a peer-reviewed academic journal publication, titled Progress in physical activity research, policy, and surveillance in Canada: The global observatory for physical activity – GoPA!

== Club career ==
In the summer during the college offseason, Cathro played with TSS FC Rovers in the Women's Premier Soccer League. In 2019, she joined Vancouver Island FC in the WPSL.

In 2021, she played for the San Antonio Athenians in the UWS.

In 2022, Cathro played with Racing Louisville FC B in the USL W League.

In January 2025, Cathro signed with Northern Super League club AFC Toronto. She made her debut on May 1, 2025, against Calgary Wild FC.

== International career ==
Cathro represented the Canada U17 and Canada U20 including at the 2016 CONCACAF FIFA Women's U17 Championship in Grenada and the 2016 FIFA U-17 Women's World Cup in Jordan. The 2016 Four-Nation Youth Tournament in China PR.

The 2017 U20 Three-Nations Tournament in Australia. The 2018 U20 CONCACAF Championship in Trinidad and Tobago. In 2019, she was selected for an international series at St. George's Park in Burton, England to face Northern Ireland and England.

In February 2017 and November 2021, she was called up to a pair of training camps and friendlies in Mexico with the Canada senior team, but did not make an appearance.
