= Victoria Pickett =

Canadian soccer player (born 1996)

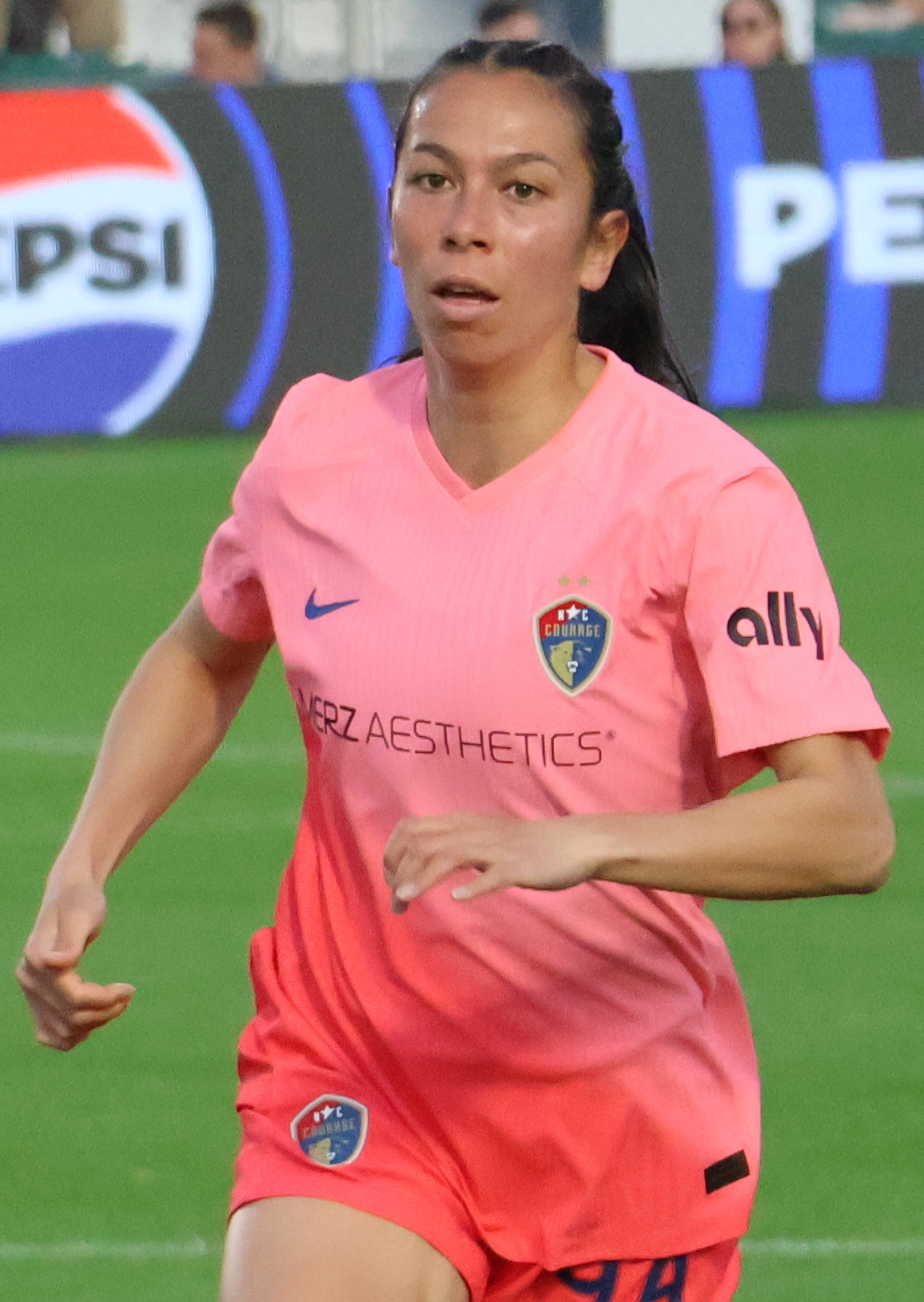
- Pickett with the North Carolina Courage in 2024

Personal information
- Full name: Victoria Serena Pickett
- Date of birth: August 12, 1996 (age 30)
- Place of birth: Newmarket, Ontario, Canada
- Height: 5 ft 6 in (1.68 m)
- Position: Midfielder

Team information
- Current team: AFC Toronto
- Number: 94

Youth career
- 2000–2008: Barrie SC
- 2008–2015: Glen Shields SC

College career
Years	Team	Apps	(Gls)
2015–2020	Wisconsin Badgers	57	(5)

Senior career*
Years	Team	Apps	(Gls)
2017	Aurora FC	8	(2)
2021–2022	Kansas City Current	35	(1)
2022–2023	NJ/NY Gotham FC	10	(0)
2023–2025	North Carolina Courage	29	(1)
2025	→ AFC Toronto (loan)	20	(1)
2026–	AFC Toronto	16	(0)

International career^{‡}
2012	Canada U17	3	(0)
2013–2016	Canada U20	9	(0)
2015	Canada U23	2	(0)
2021–2022	Canada	3	(0)
- * Club domestic league appearances and goals as of October 28, 2026 ‡ National team caps and goals as of July 15, 2022

Victoria Serena Pickett (born August 12, 1996) is a Canadian professional soccer player who plays as a midfielder for AFC Toronto in the Northern Super League. She has also played for the Canada national team.

== Early life ==
Pickett started playing soccer at age four with Barrie SC. When she was 13, she joined Glen Shields SC. She was named the Barrie Sports Athlete of the Year in 2015.

== College career ==
She played college soccer for the Wisconsin Badgers. In 2018, Pickett made the women's semifinalist list for the Hermann Trophy, an annual award for college soccer players. In 2019, she suffered a serious knee injury, tearing five ligaments, keeping her out of action until 2021. Despite the knee injury in 2019, Pickett appeared in 57 games across her college career, scoring 5 goals and providing 11 assists.

== Club career ==
In 2017, Pickett played for Aurora FC in League1 Ontario, scoring in her debut against West Ottawa SC. She finished the season with two goals in eight appearances.

Pickett was selected 15th overall by Kansas City in the 2021 NWSL Draft. In March, she signed her first professional contract, signing a three-year contract with Kansas City. She scored her first goal on August 14, 2021, to lead her team to a 1-0 victory over the OL Reign, for the franchise's first ever NWSL victory. She was one of three finalists for NWSL Rookie of the Year in 2021.

On August 22, 2022, the Kansas City Current traded Pickett to NJ/NY Gotham FC in exchange for $200,000 in allocation money and a first-round draft pick in the 2023 NWSL Draft.

On April 27, 2023, NJ/NY Gotham FC traded Pickett to the North Carolina Courage in exchange for $200,000 in allocation money. She scored her second NWSL regular-season goal on her debut for the Courage on May 6, 2023, in a 3–3 draw against the Portland Thorns. In January 2025, she was loaned to AFC Toronto of the Northern Super League for the 2025 season.

In January 2026, she signed a permanent contract with AFC Toronto.

== International career ==
When Pickett was 15 years old, she entered the Canadian youth program. She participated in the Women's Under 17 Championships at the 2012 Confederation of North, Central America, and Caribbean Association Football (CONCACAF), where she helped Canada win a silver medal.

In 2015, Pickett scored the deciding goal for Canada during the CONCACAF U-20 championship.

Pickett played as a defender for Canada in the 2015 Pan Am Games.
