= Shelina Zadorsky =

Canadian soccer player (born 1992)

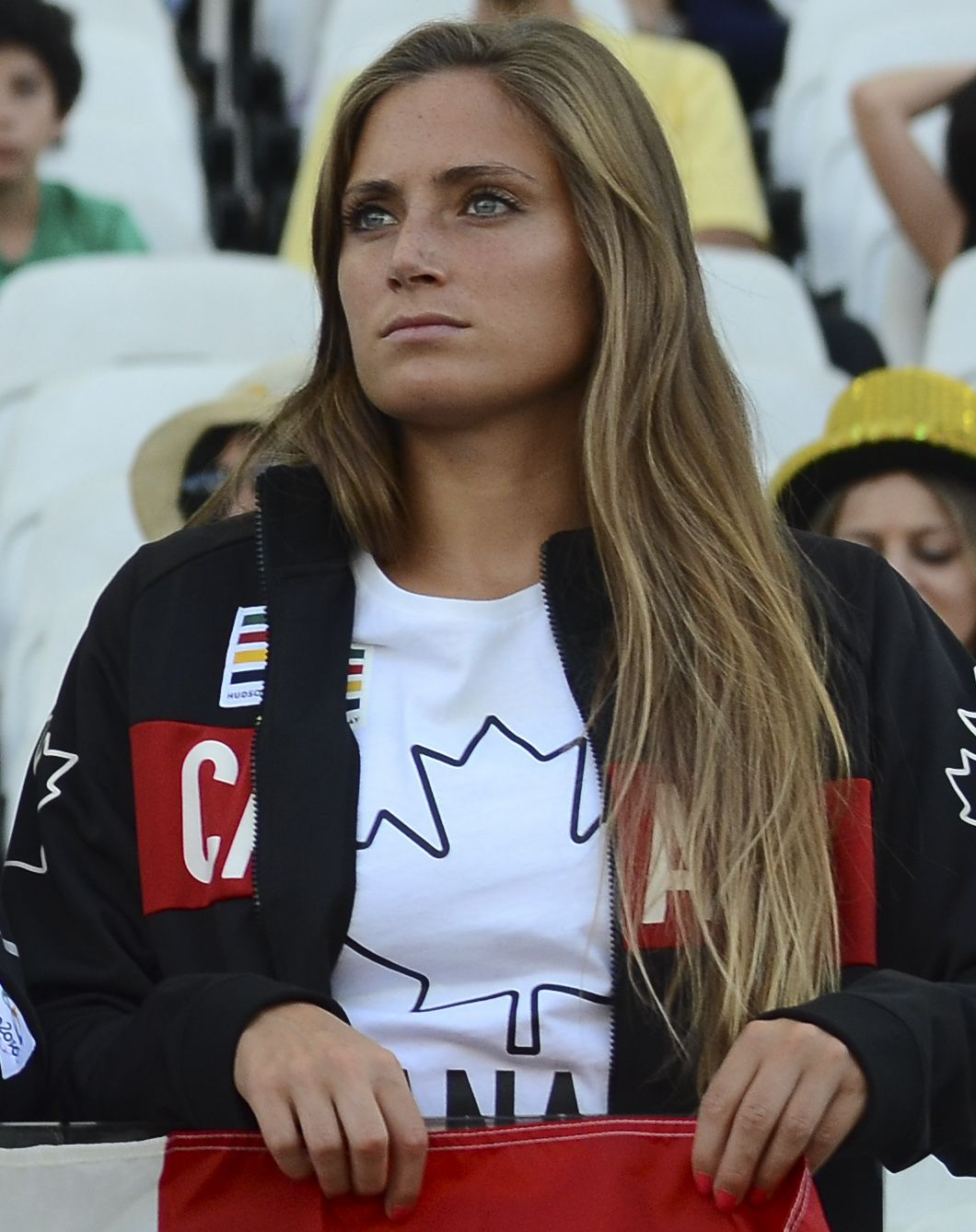
- Zadorsky in 2016

Personal information
- Full name: Shelina Laura Zadorsky
- Date of birth: October 24, 1992 (age 34)
- Place of birth: London, Ontario, Canada
- Height: 1.73 m (5 ft 8 in)
- Position: Centre-back

Team information
- Current team: AFC Toronto
- Number: 24

Youth career
- Kitchener SC
- North London SC

College career
Years	Team	Apps	(Gls)
2010–2013	Michigan Wolverines	81	(3)

Senior career*
Years	Team	Apps	(Gls)
2012	Toronto Lady Lynx		
2013–2014	Ottawa Fury		
2014–2015	Perth Glory	14	(1)
2015	Vittsjö GIK	18	(0)
2016–2017	Washington Spirit	32	(0)
2018–2020	Orlando Pride	39	(1)
2020	→ Tottenham Hotspur (loan)	8	(0)
2021–2024	Tottenham Hotspur	48	(1)
2024	→ West Ham United (loan)	9	(0)
2024–2026	West Ham United	40	(0)
2026–	AFC Toronto	13	(1)

International career^{‡}
2008	Canada U-17	9	(2)
2010–2012	Canada U-20	10	(1)
2010–2012	Canada U-23	5	(2)
2013–	Canada	121	(8)
Medal record
Women's football
Representing Canada
CONCACAF W Championship
Runner-up	2018 United States
Olympic Games
Gold medal – first place	2020 Tokyo	Team
Bronze medal – third place	2016 Rio de Janeiro	Team
- * Club domestic league appearances and goals as of October 28, 2026 ‡ National team caps and goals as of October 12, 2026

Shelina Laura Zadorsky (/zəˈdɔːrski/ zə-DORE-skee; born October 24, 1992) is a Canadian professional soccer player who plays as a centre-back for AFC Toronto in the Northern Super League and the Canada national team. Zadorsky won a bronze medal with Canada at the 2016 Rio Olympics and won a gold medal with Canada at the 2020 Tokyo Olympics.

== College career ==
Zadorsky played for the Michigan Wolverines from 2010 to 2013. She joined the Wolverines during a transitional moment in the program's history and started in every game during her first year. She captained the side during her senior year. She played in 81 games, scoring three goals overall during her time with the Wolverines.

== Club career ==
=== Ottawa Fury FC ===
Zadorsky played for USL W-League side Ottawa Fury Women, captaining them to a second-place finish in the 2013 Central Conference final and a win in 2014. The Fury disbanded its long-standing women's program in March 2015 for "business reasons".

=== Perth Glory ===
Zadorsky was signed by Australian side Perth Glory on August 1, 2014, ahead the 2014 W-League season. Zadorsky played 14 games for the Glory, scoring one goal and helping them reach the regular season win and a Grand Final appearance.

=== Vittsjö GIK ===
Following the folding of the Fury, Zadorsky signed with Damallsvenskan side Vittsjö GIK, in the top flight of Swedish football, on March 29, 2015. She appeared 18 times for side during the 2015 season.

=== Washington Spirit ===
On February 8, 2016, it was announced that Zadorsky would play for the Washington Spirit for the 2016 season of the National Women's Soccer League via the NWSL Player Allocation She played 11 regular season matches, starting 10, totaling 911 minutes in the regular season, as well as played the entire match for both post season matches. Zadorsky recorded assist in the semifinal to Ali Krieger to give the Spirit the early lead on the way to the team's first ever semifinal victory. Zadorsky was voted Spirit Newcomer of the Year for 2016.

She played 21 games for the Spirit in 2017, serving as the side's captain.

=== Orlando Pride ===
On January 23, 2018, Zadorsky was traded to the Orlando Pride in exchange for Aubrey Bledsoe and a first round draft pick. Zadorsky played in 23 games during her first season with the Pride. She was reassigned as a federation player to the Pride ahead of the 2019 season. On September 29, 2019, Zadorsky scored her first goal for the club in a 1–1 draw with Sky Blue FC. In March 2020, the impending NWSL season was postponed due to the coronavirus pandemic. An eventual restart was made through a smaller schedule 2020 NWSL Challenge Cup tournament. However, on June 22, Orlando withdrew from the tournament following positive COVID-19 tests among both players and staff.

=== Tottenham Hotspur ===
In August 2020, due to Orlando Pride withdrawing from the Challenge Cup due to COVID-19, Zadorsky moved to English FA WSL club Tottenham Hotspur on loan ahead of the 2020–21 season. The loan was made permanent through the end of the season in January 2021. With Zadorsky's leadership skills and elite play, she was appointed captain during the 2021–22 season.

=== West Ham United ===
On 3 January 2024, Zadorsky joined West Ham United on loan until the end of the 2023–24 season. Following the expiration of her contract with Tottenham, she returned to West Ham on a free transfer on 19 August 2024. Having been made the club's vice-captain in the summer of 2024, it was announced on July 24, 2025, that she had signed a one-year contract to extend her time with West Ham with head coach Rheanne Skinner saying Zadorsky that "She knows what it takes to be a winner. Her attitude on a daily basis is a great example for the other players around her". She underwent surgery following an injury sustained in training in December 2025.

=== AFC Toronto ===
On July 8, 2026, it was announced that Zadorsky had declined a contract extension with West Ham and had instead signed for Northern Super League club AFC Toronto.

== International career ==
=== Youth ===
Zadorsky made her debut for Canada's youth teams at the age of 14. She won a bronze medal at the 2008 CONCACAF Women's U-17 Championship, represented Canada at the 2008 FIFA U-17 Women's World Cup in New Zealand, played for Canada at their fourth-place finish at the 2010 CONCACAF Women's U-20 Championship in Guatemala, won silver at the 2012 CONCACAF Women's U-20 Championship in Panama and represented Canada at the 2012 FIFA U-20 Women's World Cup in Japan.

=== Senior ===
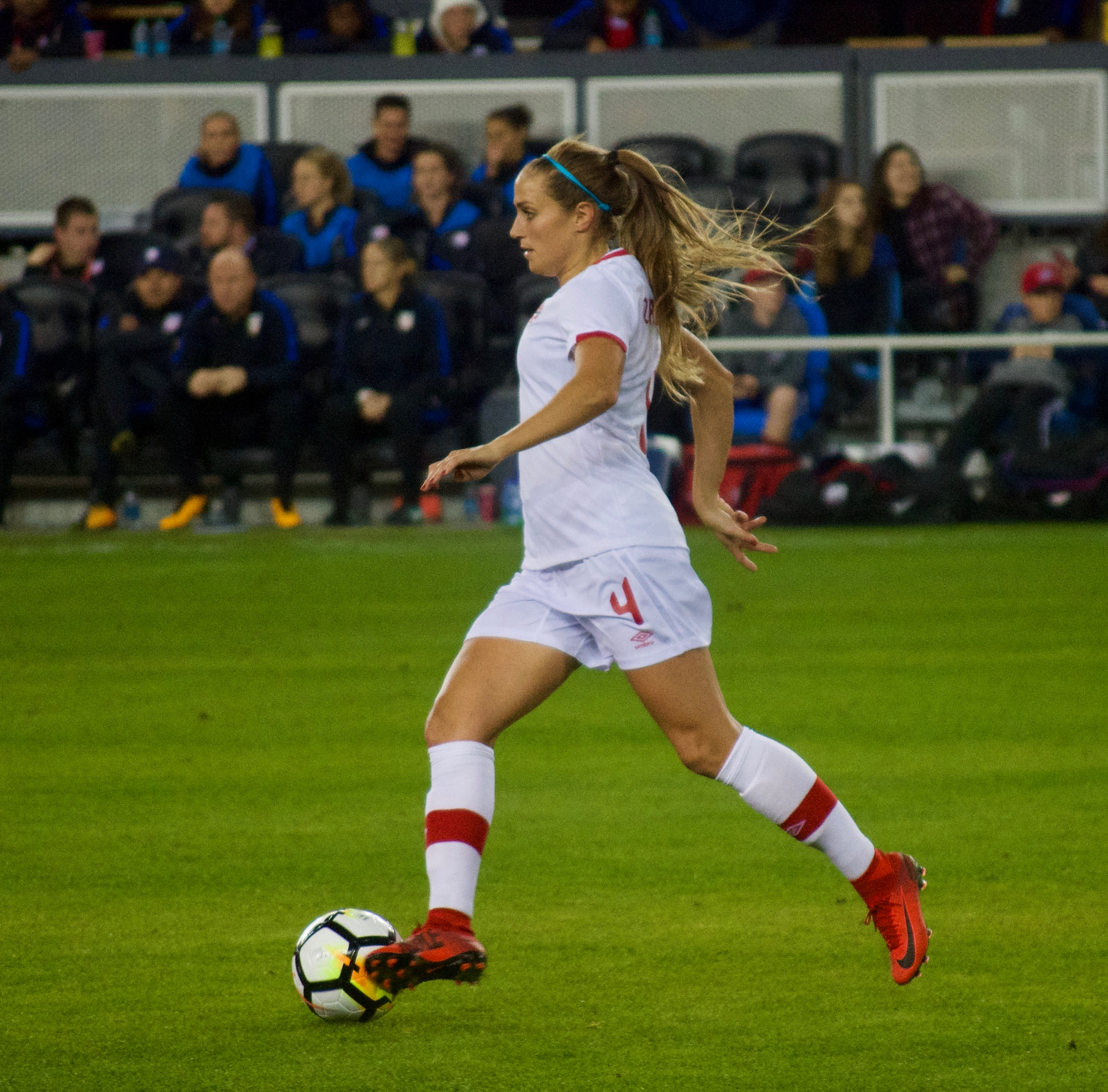
Zadorsky with Canada in November 2017

Zadorsky made her full team debut on January 14, 2013, at the age of 20. While Zadorsky did not make the 2015 Women's World Cup roster, she was in the side that finished fourth at the 2015 Pan American Games in Toronto. She was on the roster and played on the Canadian side which won the bronze medal at the 2016 Rio Olympics.

On May 25, 2019, she was named to the roster for the 2019 FIFA World Cup.

Zadorsky was called up to the Canada squad for the delayed 2020 Summer Olympics.

Zadorsky was called up to the Canada squad for the 2022 CONCACAF W Championship, where Canada finished as runners-up.

She was also named to the Canada squad for the 2023 FIFA World Cup.

Zadorsky was called up to the Canada squad for the 2024 CONCACAF W Gold Cup, which Canada finished as semifinalists.

Zadorsky made her 100th appearance for Canada in a 1-1 draw against Mexico in a friendly on June 4, 2024, marking the occasion with an assist through a cross converted by Kadiesha Buchanan.

On July 1, 2024, Zadorsky was named to Canada's 2024 Summer Olympics squad as an alternate. Ahead of Canada's first match of the tournament against New Zealand, Zadorsky's teammate Jayde Riviere suffered an ankle injury in a pre-tournament match versus Nigeria. Zadorsky was activated onto the full roster in Riviere's stead. With Riviere unable to recover in time to participate in a match, Zadorsky was named on the team sheet in all four of Canada's games in the tournament. She came off the bench in Canada's matches against New Zealand and Colombia, playing a total of six minutes.

== Personal life ==
Zadorsky was in a relationship with her Tottenham teammate Rosella Ayane as of September 2022.

== Career statistics ==
=== Club ===
As of match played October 28, 2026

Club	Season	League			Playoffs		National cup (Note: includes Svenska Cupen Damer, Women's FA Cup)		League cup (Note: includes FA Women's League Cup)		Total	
Club	Season	Division	Apps	Goals	Apps	Goals	Apps	Goals	Apps	Goals	Apps	Goals
Perth Glory	2014–15	W-League	14	1	—		—		—		14	1
Vittsjö GIK	2015	Damallsvenskan	18	0	—		1	0	—		19	0
Washington Spirit	2016	NWSL	11	0	2	0	—		—		13	0
Washington Spirit	2017	NWSL	21	0	—		—		—		21	0
Washington Spirit	Total		32	0	2	0	0	0	0	0	34	0
Orlando Pride	2018	NWSL	23	0	—		—		—		23	0
Orlando Pride	2019	NWSL	16	1	—		—		—		16	1
Orlando Pride	Total		39	1	0!0	0	0	0	0	39	1	
Tottenham Hotspur	2020–21	Women's Super League	20	0	—		2	0	3	1	25	1
Tottenham Hotspur	2021–22	Women's Super League	21	1	—		1	0	5	0	27	1
Tottenham Hotspur	2022–23	Women's Super League	13	0	—		1	0	2	0	16	0
Tottenham Hotspur	2023–24	Women's Super League	2	0	—		0	0	3	0	5	0
Tottenham Hotspur	Total		56	1	0	0	4	0	13	1	73	2
West Ham United (loan)	2023–24	Women's Super League	9	0	—		1	0	0	0	10	0
West Ham United	2024–25	Women's Super League	21	0	—		1	0	4	0	26	0
West Ham United	2025–26	Women's Super League	12	0	—		1	0	2	0	15	0
West Ham United	Total		40	0	0	0	2	0	6	0	51	0
AFC Toronto	2026	Northern Super League	13	1	0	0	—		—		13	1
Career total			214	4	2	0	8	0	19	1	242	5

=== International ===
As of match played October 12, 2026

Appearances and goals by national team and year
National team	Year	Apps	Goals
Canada	2013	1	0
Canada	2015	3	0
Canada	2016	18	1
Canada	2017	12	0
Canada	2018	11	0
Canada	2019	14	0
Canada	2020	7	1
Canada	2021	11	0
Canada	2022	10	2
Canada	2023	8	0
Canada	2024	9	2
Canada	2025	13	2
Canada	2026	4	0
Total		121	8

Scores and results list Canada goal tally first, score column indicates score after each Zadorsky goal.

International goals by date, venue, opponent, score, result and competition
No.	Date	Venue	Opponent	Score	Result	Competition
1	March 9, 2016	Bela Vista Municipal Stadium, Parchal, Portugal	Brazil	1–0	2–1	2016 Algarve Cup
2	February 4, 2020	H-E-B Park, Edinburg, Texas, United States	Mexico	2–0	2–0	2020 CONCACAF Olympic qualifying
3	April 11, 2022	Starlight Stadium, Langford, Canada	Nigeria	2–0	2–0	Friendly
4	November 11, 2022	Vila Belmiro, São Paulo, Brazil	Brazil	1–0	2–1	Friendly
5	February 28, 2024	Shell Energy Stadium, Houston, Texas, United States	Costa Rica	2–0	3–0	2024 CONCACAF W Gold Cup
6	February 28, 2024	Shell Energy Stadium, Houston, Texas, United States	Costa Rica	3–0	3–0	2024 CONCACAF W Gold Cup
7	May 31, 2025	Princess Auto Stadium, Winnipeg, Canada	Haiti	3–0	4–1	Friendly
8	June 27, 2025	BMO Field, Toronto, Canada	Costa Rica	1–1	4–1	Friendly

== Honours ==
Perth Glory

- W-League runner-up: 2014

Canada U20

- CONCACAF Women's U-20 Championship runner-up: 2012

Canada

- Summer Olympics: 2021; bronze medal: 2016

== See also ==
- List of women's footballers with 100 or more international caps
