= Zoe Burns =

Canadian soccer player (born 2002)

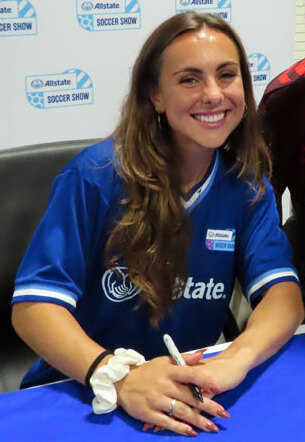
- Burns in 2026

Personal information
- Full name: Zoe Mackenzie Chabot Burns
- Date of birth: January 5, 2002 (age 24)
- Place of birth: Puyallup, Washington, U.S.
- Height: 5 ft 2 in (1.58 m)
- Position: Defender

Team information
- Current team: AFC Toronto
- Number: 12

Youth career
- Eastside FC
- Issaquah SC Gunners
- Crossfire Premier

College career
Years	Team	Apps	(Gls)
2020–2023	USC Trojans	68	(6)

Senior career*
Years	Team	Apps	(Gls)
2024	Utah Royals	21	(0)
2025	Fleury	3	(0)
2025–	AFC Toronto	34	(3)

International career^{‡}
2018	United States U16	3	(0)
2022	Canada U20	10	(2)
2022–	Canada	2	(0)
Medal record
Representing Canada
CONCACAF W Championship
Silver medal – second place	2022 Mexico
CONCACAF Women's U-20 Championship
Bronze medal – third place	2022 Dominican Republic
- * Club domestic league appearances and goals as of October 28, 2026 ‡ National team caps and goals as of October 10, 2022

Zoe Mackenzie Chabot Burns (born January 5, 2002) is a professional soccer player who plays as a defender for Northern Super League (NSL) club AFC Toronto. Born in the United States to Canadian parents, she represents Canada at international level.

Burns played college soccer for the USC Trojans, earning All-Pac-12 second-team honours three times. She was selected by the Utah Royals in the 2024 NWSL Draft and spent her rookie season with the club before a brief spell with French club FC Fleury 91. She joined AFC Toronto in 2025, helping the club win the NSL's first Supporters' Shield and reach the inaugural league final.

After playing in the United States youth national team program, Burns switched to Canada in 2022. She was named to the Best XI at the 2022 CONCACAF Women's U-20 Championship, played at the 2022 FIFA U-20 Women's World Cup, and earned two senior caps that year.

== Early life ==
Burns was born in Puyallup, Washington, and grew up in Issaquah. Her mother was born in Noranda, Quebec, and her father in Oshawa, Ontario. She began playing soccer at age five with Eastside FC and also took part in martial arts and gymnastics as a child. She later played club soccer for Crossfire Premier, where she was named a United Soccer Coaches All-American in 2019. She played for the Washington State Olympic Development Program (ODP) from 2015 to 2017, winning a U.S. Youth Soccer ODP national championship in 2016 and regional titles in 2016 and 2017. At Issaquah High School, she scored six goals in 17 games and earned All-KingCo honours in 2016. She committed to USC at 14.

== College career ==
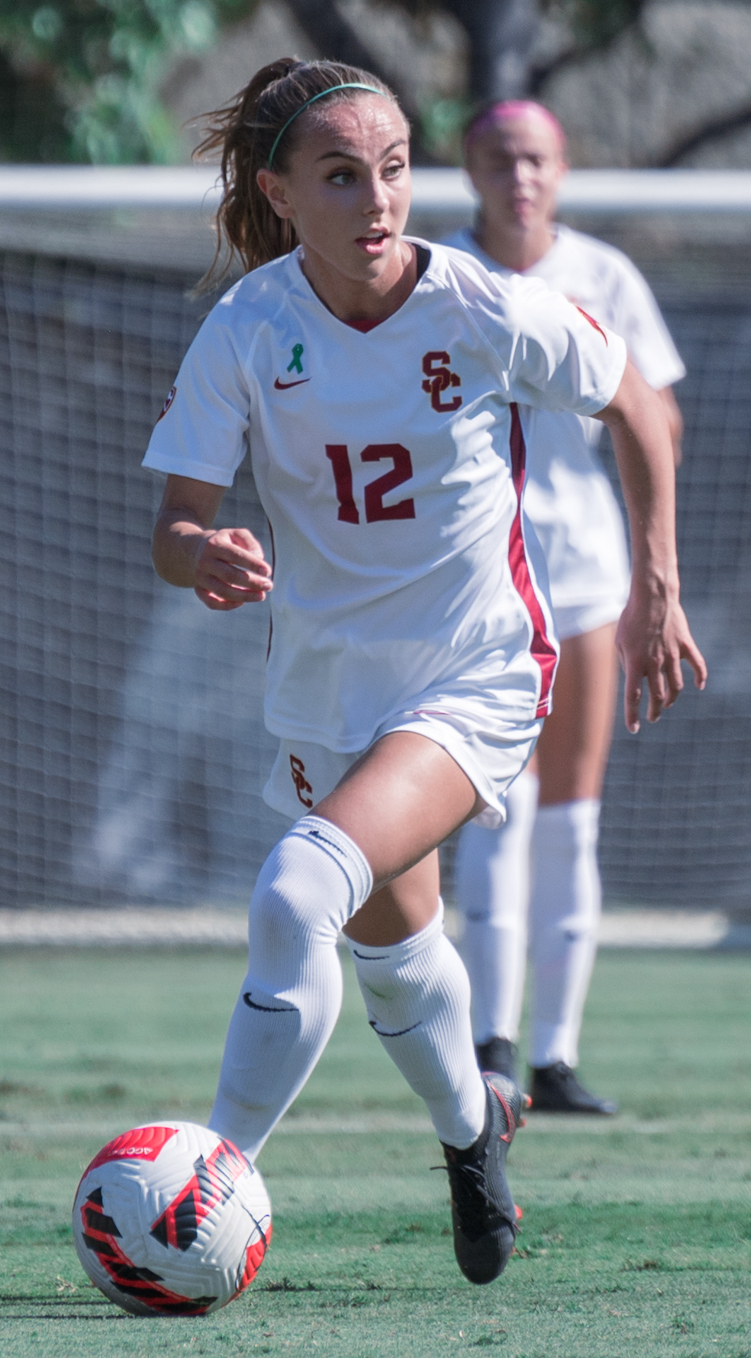
Burns playing for USC in 2021

Burns attended the University of Southern California from 2020, playing four seasons for the USC Trojans. In the 2020–21 season, she appeared in all 14 of USC's matches as a freshman and scored her first college goal in a postseason match against the Ole Miss Rebels on April 30, 2021. As a sophomore in autumn 2021, she played in all 20 matches, mainly at outside back, scored the winning goal against Utah and earned All-Pac-12 second-team honours.

Burns missed the opening match of her junior season while playing for Canada at the U-20 World Cup, then started all 15 matches in which she appeared, scoring three goals. She was named to the United Soccer Coaches All-Region second team and the All-Pac-12 second team. As a senior in 2023, she started all 19 of her matches, scoring once and recording six assists. She was again named to the All-Pac-12 second team and was selected to the All-Pacific Region first team. Over four seasons, she made 68 appearances, 58 of them starts, with six goals and ten assists, and helped USC reach the postseason each year.

== Club career ==
=== Utah Royals ===
Burns with the Utah Royals in 2024

Burns was selected by the Utah Royals in the third round (29th overall) of the 2024 NWSL Draft, reuniting her with head coach Amy Rodriguez, who had been an assistant coach at USC. She signed a one-year contract on March 7, 2024. She made her professional debut on April 12, coming on as a substitute for Paige Monaghan in a 1–0 loss to the Orlando Pride. In her rookie season, she made 24 appearances in all competitions and led the team with 51 tackles during the regular season. In December 2024, Utah announced that she would not return for the 2025 season, leaving her an unrestricted free agent.

=== FC Fleury 91 ===
On February 4, 2025, Burns joined French Première Ligue club FC Fleury 91 on a contract until 2026. She was among the players who left the club that summer.

=== AFC Toronto ===
On June 30, 2025, Burns signed with Northern Super League club AFC Toronto, joining officially on July 1. Sporting director Billy Wilson said that adding a right-sided wingback had been a priority for the club that summer. On August 30, she scored her first NSL goals, both of them either side of half-time, in a 2–0 win over Calgary Wild FC at York Lions Stadium. Toronto finished first in the regular season to win the league's inaugural Supporters' Shield, and Burns played in the NSL final on November 15, which Toronto lost 2–1 to Vancouver Rise FC at BMO Field.

On January 15, 2026, AFC Toronto announced that Burns had signed a contract extension through 2027. She opened the scoring in the eighth minute of Toronto's first match of the 2026 season, a 3–2 win over Vancouver Rise at Swangard Stadium on April 24, 2026.

== International career ==
=== United States youth ===
Burns was part of United States youth national team programs from 2016 to 2018, attending multiple under-16 camps. In 2018, she helped the U.S. under-16 team win the UEFA Development Tournament in Portugal, recording an assist in the final match to clinch the title.

=== Canada ===
In February 2022, Burns was named to the Canada U-20 squad for the 2022 CONCACAF Women's U-20 Championship in the Dominican Republic. She scored her first goal on March 4 in a 13–0 win over the Cayman Islands. In the third-place match on March 12, she scored Canada's opening goal from a penalty kick in a 2–0 win over Puerto Rico, which qualified Canada for the 2022 FIFA U-20 Women's World Cup. She was named to the tournament's Best XI. That August, she represented Canada at the U-20 World Cup in Costa Rica.

In March 2022, Burns received her first senior call-up for a pair of friendlies against Nigeria on the team's Olympic gold medal celebration tour. She made her debut on April 11 at Starlight Stadium in Langford, coming on in the second half and playing about 35 minutes at left back before moving to right back. In June, she was named to Canada's squad for the 2022 CONCACAF W Championship in Mexico, where Canada won the silver medal. She earned her second cap as a late substitute in a 4–0 friendly win over Morocco in Jerez de la Frontera, Spain, on October 10, 2022.

== Personal life ==
Burns holds Canadian and American citizenship. She sang in choirs and performed in musical theatre before college, and has released music as a singer-songwriter. She co-wrote and performs "In The 6ix", AFC Toronto's official theme song, which debuted at the club's 2026 home opener at BMO Field on May 3, 2026.

== Honours ==
AFC Toronto

- Northern Super League Supporters' Shield: 2025
- Northern Super League runner-up: 2025

Canada

- CONCACAF W Championship runner-up: 2022

Canada U-20

- CONCACAF Women's U-20 Championship third place: 2022

United States U-16

- UEFA Development Tournament: 2018

Individual

- CONCACAF Women's U-20 Championship Best XI: 2022
- All-Pac-12 second team: 2021, 2022, 2023
- United Soccer Coaches All-Pacific Region first team: 2023
- United Soccer Coaches All-Pacific Region second team: 2022
