= Sofia Manner =

Finnish footballer (born 1997)

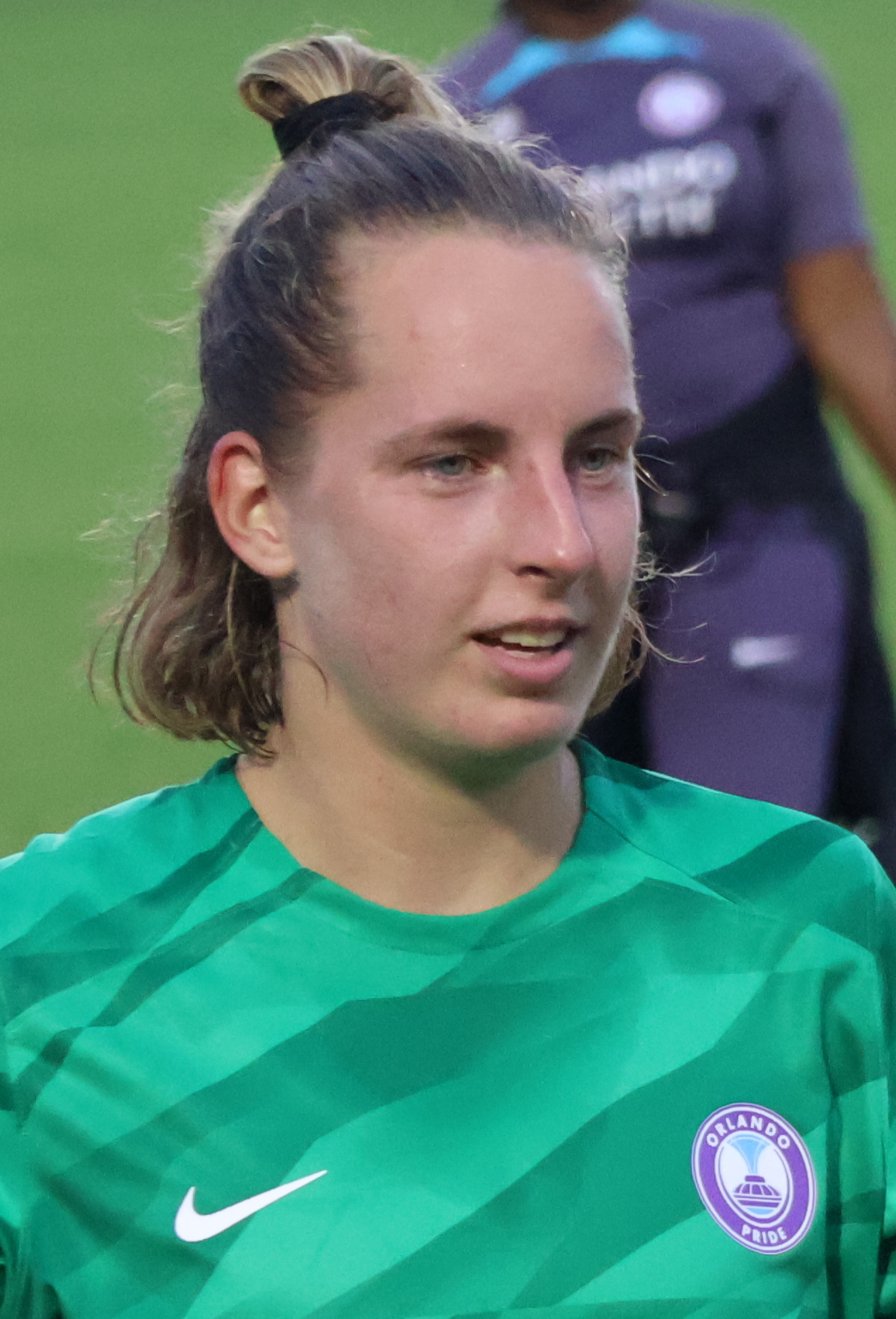
- Manner with the Orlando Pride in 2024

Personal information
- Date of birth: 11 September 1997 (age 29)
- Place of birth: Helsinki, Finland
- Height: 6 ft 1 in (1.85 m)
- Position: Goalkeeper

Team information
- Current team: Napoli
- Number: 22

Youth career
- 2009–2016: HJK

College career
Years	Team	Apps	(Gls)
2017–2019	Stony Brook Seawolves	61	(0)
2021	Lynn Fighting Knights	13	(0)

Senior career*
Years	Team	Apps	(Gls)
2021	Honka	11	(0)
2022	Fjölnir	10	(0)
2023	Honka	34	(0)
2024	Orlando Pride	0	(0)
2025–2026	AFC Toronto	17	(0)
2026–	Napoli	1	(0)

International career
2012	Finland U16		
2013	Finland U17		
2014	Finland U18		
- * Club domestic league appearances and goals as of 17 October 2026

Sofia Manner (born 11 September 1997) is a Finnish professional footballer who plays as a goalkeeper who plays for Italian club Napoli in the Serie A.

Manner moved to the United States to attend college at Stony Brook University, where she played three seasons for the Stony Brook Seawolves. She won the America East Rookie of the Year award as a freshman in 2017, and won the America East Goalkeeper of the Year award in both her next two seasons. With Manner, Stony Brook made two NCAA Tournaments and won two America East championships.

In 2021, she signed with FC Honka of Kansallinen Liiga (National League), the highest league of Finnish football. Ahead of the 2024 season, she signed a two-year contract with the Orlando Pride of the National Women's Soccer League (NWSL), making history as the first player in history to transfer from Finland's highest league to the NWSL.

== Early life ==
Manner played for HJK Helsinki from 2009 to 2016. She also played on Finland's International School Sport Federation (ISF) team for futsal, which finished in second place in the world championships.

== College career ==
Manner moved to the United States to play for Stony Brook University's collegiate Seawolves team. She committed to the program because she knew another Finnish woman who was an au pair for an American family with connections to a Stony Brook women's soccer team staff member.

In her freshman season in 2017, Manner won the America East Rookie of the Year award after finishing second in the league with a 0.68 GAA in conference play. Stony Brook won the America East championship as Manner made five saves in the title game against Vermont. Stony Brook lost to Penn State in the opening round of the NCAA Tournament.

In 2018, Manner won the America East Goalkeeper of the Year award as a sophomore, leading Stony Brook to a regular season title while leading the conference with a .794 save percentage and seven shutouts. Manner won her second consecutive America East Goalkeeper of the Year award in 2019 as Stony Brook won the America East championship for the second time in three years and returned to face Penn State again in the NCAA Tournament. Her nine shutouts were one short of the all-time single-season program record.

Manner's planned senior season was postponed to spring 2021 as a result of the COVID-19 pandemic. She graduated from Stony Brook instead in December 2020 to pursue a professional career. In just three seasons, Manner ended her Stony Brook career with a 1.14 GAA, the fourth-best in program history, and 20 shutouts, the third-most.

After playing 11 games for FC Honka, Manner returned to the United States to study for her master's degree in digital media in 2021, joining Division II Lynn University in Boca Raton, Florida. She played 13 times for Lynn and was named first team all-conference and recorded a season-high of eight saves in three separate games.

== Club career ==
Manner signed with FC Honka in 2021 in Espoo.

In 2022, Manner signed with UMF Fjölnir of Iceland's 1. deild karla, where she was the starting goalkeeper and played 10 games.

She returned to FC Honka in 2023, where she allowed the least goals in the league during the season. Manner was named Player of the Month in April and won Goalkeeper of the Month twice. She recorded 10 clean sheets and was named to the All-Star team by Yle. She was awarded Goalkeeper of the Year and was also nominated for the Best Player Award.

On 1 December 2023, Manner signed with National Women's Soccer League club Orlando Pride on a two-year deal, with an option for an additional year. She became the first player to transfer from Finland's Kansallinen Liiga to the NWSL, and it was reported that the transfer fee was the highest received in the history of the Kansallinen Liiga. Manner made her Pride debut on 7 July 2024, in the NWSL x Liga MX Femenil Summer Cup. She saved three shots during the match and one in the ensuing penalty shootout that occurred after the end of regulation. She did not make any further appearances in her time with Orlando.

On 14 January 2025, Manner was transferred to Northern Super League club AFC Toronto for an undisclosed fee ahead of the league's inaugural season. In July 2026, she agreed to a mutual termination of her contract, in order to pursue another opportunity in Europe.

On 28 July 2026, Manner signed a two-year contract with Serie A club Napoli.

== International career ==
Between 2012 and 2015, Manner was capped by Finland at under-16, under-17 and under-18 level. She played during the 2014 UEFA Women's Under-17 Championship qualification rounds.

== Honours ==
Stony Brook Seawolves

- America East Tournament: 2017, 2019
- America East regular season: 2018, 2019

Orlando Pride

- NWSL Shield: 2024
- NWSL Championship: 2024

Individual

- America East Freshman of the Year: 2017
- America East Goalkeeper of the Year: 2018, 2019
- Kansallinen Liiga Goalkeeper of the Year: 2023
