= Nikayla Small =

Canadian soccer player (born 2003)

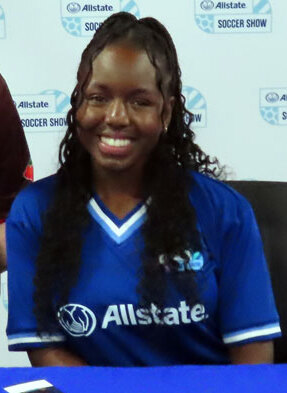
- Small in 2026

Personal information
- Full name: Nikayla Desiree Small
- Date of birth: March 24, 2003 (age 23)
- Place of birth: Toronto, Ontario, Canada
- Height: 1.55 m (5 ft 1 in)
- Positions: Midfielder; full-back

Team information
- Current team: AFC Toronto
- Number: 4

Youth career
- Pickering SC
- NDC Ontario

College career
Years	Team	Apps	(Gls)
2021–2024	Wake Forest Demon Deacons	60	(4)

Senior career*
Years	Team	Apps	(Gls)
2022	NDC Ontario	10	(1)
2024	Eagle FC	8	(3)
2025–	AFC Toronto	50	(7)

International career^{‡}
2018	Canada U15	4	(1)
2022	Canada U20	4	(1)
2026–	Jamaica	1	(0)
- * Club domestic league appearances and goals as of October 28, 2026 ‡ National team caps and goals as of June 8, 2026

Nikayla Desiree Small (born March 24, 2003) is a soccer player who plays as a midfielder for and captains AFC Toronto in the Northern Super League. Born in Canada, she represents Jamaica at international level.

A youth product of Pickering SC and NDC Ontario, Small played four college seasons for the Wake Forest Demon Deacons, earning All-ACC Freshman Team honours and appearing in 60 games before signing with AFC Toronto in January 2025 ahead of the Northern Super League's inaugural season. She scored three goals across four days in June 2025 to win the club's Player of the Month award, then scored the late winner that clinched the inaugural Supporters' Shield in October 2025 and again in the first leg of the NSL semifinal. She was named club captain in April 2026, in only her second season with the team.

Small represented Canada at three youth levels, earning a Best XI selection at the 2018 CONCACAF Girls' U-15 Championship and serving as one of the team's captains at the 2022 FIFA U-20 Women's World Cup. After being called into a senior Canada camp as a training player in 2021. She switched her international allegiance to Jamaica and made her senior debut in June 2026.

== Early life ==
Small was born in Toronto and grew up in Pickering. She started playing at the age of four, encouraged by her father, who had played the game himself and took her and her brothers to local fields; she has said she would stop playing if the sport ever stopped being enjoyable. She developed with Pickering SC before being selected for the NDC Ontario program. Small has said that provincial call-ups around the ages of 13 and 14 first convinced her that a professional career was realistic, although no Canadian women's league existed at the time.

== College career ==
In 2021, Small enrolled at Wake Forest University, where she played four seasons for the Demon Deacons, appearing in 60 games with 53 starts and recording 4 goals and 15 assists. She was named to the Atlantic Coast Conference All-Freshman Team after her first season and to the conference honor roll in 2022. As a junior she was one of only four players to appear in all 18 matches and led the team with a career-high seven assists, ranking eighth in the conference in assists per game.

Small was primarily a defensive midfielder as a youth player and was converted into an attacking midfielder in college, also spending time on the wing — a transition she credits for her later effectiveness as a wing-back.

== Club career ==
In 2022, Small played for NDC Ontario in League1 Ontario. In 2024, she played for Eagle FC in the USL W League, scoring three goals in eight matches.

=== AFC Toronto ===
On January 27, 2025, Small signed her first professional contract with AFC Toronto ahead of the inaugural Northern Super League season. She scored her first professional goal on June 11, 2025, in a 3–2 win over Vancouver Rise FC, and added two more three days later in a 2–1 win at Calgary Wild FC. That three-goal run earned her AFC Toronto's fan-voted club Player of the Month award for June 2025.

On October 19, 2025, Small scored the late winner in a 2–1 defeat of Montreal Roses FC as Toronto secured the league's inaugural Supporters' Shield. She also scored in the first leg of the first NSL semifinal, a 2–0 win over Montreal on November 1, 2025. In December 2025, the club announced a contract extension keeping her at AFC Toronto through 2027.

On April 22, 2026, in only her second season with the club, Small was named AFC Toronto captain. On August 23, 2026, she scored her first goal of the season in a 2–0 away win over Halifax Tides FC, one of two Toronto goals inside a 12-minute span of the first half.

== International career ==
=== Canada ===
In August 2018, Small received her first Canada call-up, joining the under-15 team for the 2018 CONCACAF Girls' U-15 Championship, where she was named to the tournament Best XI. She was later part of the under-17 program and represented the under-20 team at the 2022 CONCACAF Women's U-20 Championship and the 2022 FIFA U-20 Women's World Cup, where she served as one of the squad's three captains.

In October 2021, Small was called into a Canada senior team camp for the first time as a training player. She received two senior call-ups that year but did not earn a cap.

=== Jamaica ===
In June 2026, Small accepted a call-up to the Jamaica national team for a pair of friendlies against Panama in Panama City, held in preparation for the CONCACAF W Championship. She featured as a starter for Jamaica during the first match, which the team won 1–0.

== Personal life ==
Small grew up in an Arsenal-supporting household and follows the Premier League; her father and brothers are also Arsenal fans. In July 2026, she was one of six AFC Toronto players featured in a Clinique campaign built around the club.
