= Marko Milanović (soccer) =

Canadian soccer coach

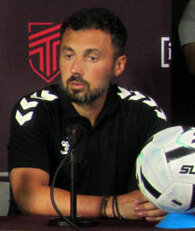
- Milanović in 2025

Personal information
- Place of birth: Sarajevo, SR Bosnia and Herzegovina, SFR Yugoslavia

Team information
- Current team: AFC Toronto (head coach)

College career
Years	Team	Apps	(Gls)
2003	Ryerson Rams		
2005–2007	Ryerson Rams		

Managerial career
- 2019: DeRo United FC (women)
- 2021–2024: North Toronto Nitros
- 2022–2024: TMU Bold (assistant)
- 2024–: AFC Toronto (women)

Marko Milanović is a soccer coach, who currently serves as head coach of AFC Toronto in the Northern Super League.

== College career ==
Milanović attended Ryerson University, where he played for the men's soccer team. He was named team MVP in 2005 and was a Blue R recipient in 2007. He served as team captain for a period of time on the squad.

== Coaching career ==
Milanović holds a UEFA A Coach License and Canada Soccer Youth License.

In 2008, he joined the North Toronto Nitros as a youth program coach.

In 2019, he served as the head coach of DeRo United FC in the League1 Ontario women's division.

In 2021, he became the head coach of the North Toronto Nitros men's team in League1 Ontario. In July 2024, he was awarded the Coaches High Performance Award at the Centre Circle Awards, the highest level of recognition from the Ontario Soccer Association.

In 2022, he joined Toronto Metropolitan University (formerly Ryerson) as an assistant coach with the TMU Bold men's soccer team (while still continuing in his role as the North Toronto Nitros head coach).

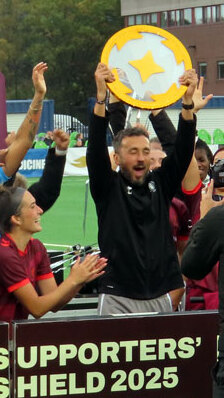
Milanovic celebrating 2025 Supporters Shield title

In August 2024, he was named the head coach of AFC Toronto, ahead of their inaugural season in the women's Northern Super League in 2025. After 12 continuous weeks in first place, in September 2025, he guided Toronto to win the first-ever Supporters’ Shield in league history after clinching a finish at the top of the NSL regular season league table. He was also named the league's Coach of the Year in 2025.

== Personal life ==
Milanović holds dual Serbian and Canadian citizenship.

== Coaching statistics ==
=== Men ===
As of September 4, 2024

Coaching record by team and tenure
Team	Nat.	League	From	To	Record				
Team	Nat.	League	From	To	G	W	D	L	Win %
North Toronto Nitros	CAN	League1 Ontario	2021	2024	80	36	14	30	45.00
Total					80	36	14	30	45.00

=== Women ===
As of July 12, 2025

Coaching record by team and tenure
Team	Nat.	League	From	To	Record				
Team	Nat.	League	From	To	G	W	D	L	Win %
DeRo United FC	CAN	League1 Ontario	2019		13	5	3	5	38.46
AFC Toronto	CAN	Northern Super League	2025	Present	11	7	1	3	63.64
Total					24	12	4	8	50.00
