= North Toronto Nitros =

Canadian soccer team

- Full name: North Toronto Soccer Club
- Nickname: Nitros
- Founded: 1980
- Stadium: Downsview Turf
- Head Coach: Marko Milanović (men); Billy Wilson (women)
- League: Ontario Premier League
- 2025: L1O-P, 10th (men); L1O-P, 2nd (women)
- Website: https://northtorontosoccer.com/
Home colours

North Toronto Nitros is a Canadian semi-professional soccer club based in Toronto, Ontario. The club was founded in 1980 as a youth soccer club and added its men's semi-professional club in the Ontario Premier League in 2016 and its women's team in the Ontario Premier League women's division in 2021.

== History ==
The club was founded in 1980 as a youth soccer club. They updated the club logo in 2019, combining the club logo and Nitros team logo.

Club and team logo until 2019

Originally a youth soccer club, the team added a men's semi-professional team in League1 Ontario in 2016, playing their home games at the University of Toronto's Varsity Stadium. They played their inaugural match on April 30, 2016, on the road against Vaughan Azzurri, which they lost by a score of 2–1. They defeated Aurora United by a score of 5–0 in their home debut.

In 2018, the club departed the league, going on hiatus. Two years later, they were set to return to the league for the 2020 season and also added a women's team to the League1 Ontario women's division for the first time, providing a full senior high-performance pathway for players based in downtown Toronto, however, due to the COVID-19 pandemic, the season was cancelled, delaying their return (and the women's team's debut) to 2021. They moved their home field to the Downsview Park turf fields.

In 2025, the women's team won the L1O League Cup, defeating Alliance United FC in the final, by a score of 5-1, after finishing as runner-ups in the prior year.

== Seasons ==
=== Men ===
Season	League	Teams	Record	Rank	Playoffs	League Cup	Ref
2016	League1 Ontario	16	14–3–5	3rd, East (4th overall)	did not qualify	Semi-finals	
2017	League1 Ontario	16	11–3–8	3rd, East (7th overall)	did not qualify	Round of 16	
2018	on hiatus						
2019	on hiatus						
2020	Season cancelled due to COVID-19 pandemic						
2021	League1 Ontario	15	1–1–10	7th, East (14th)	did not qualify	–	
2022	League1 Ontario	22	13–5–3	4th	Quarter Finals	–	
2023	League1 Ontario	21	9–4–7	10th	did not qualify	–	
2024	League1 Ontario Premier	12	10–4–8	4th	–	Semi-Finals	
2025	League1 Ontario Premier	11	5–2–13	10th	–	Quarter-Finals	

=== Women ===
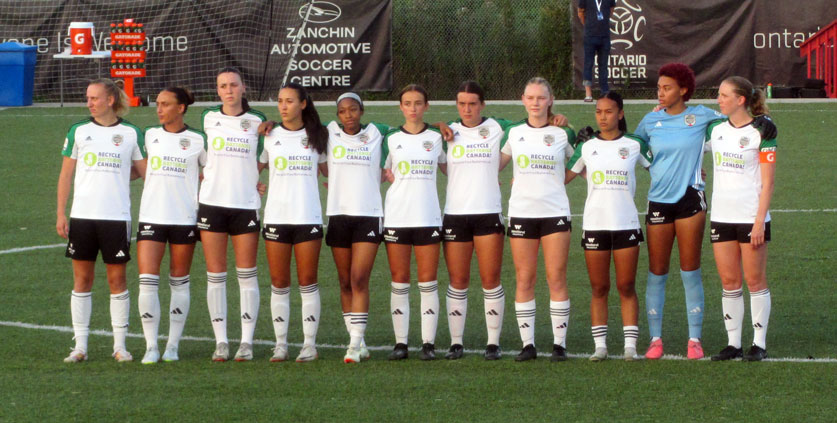
North Toronto Nitros starters in 2024

Season	League	Teams	Record	Rank	Playoffs	League Cup	Ref
2021	League1 Ontario	7	4–0–8	6th	Did not qualify	–	
2022	League1 Ontario	20	10–6–3	7th	Did not qualify	–	
2023	League1 Ontario	19	12–2–4	3rd	Quarter-finals	–	
2024	League1 Ontario Premier	10	11–3–4	3rd	–	Finalists	
2025	League1 Ontario Premier	10	13–3–2	2nd	–	Champions	

== Notable former players ==
The following players have either played at the professional or international level, either before or after playing for the League1 Ontario team:

Men

- (Canada) Matthew Chandler
- (Canada) Jacob Carlos
- (Bermuda) Kilian Elkinson
- (Bangladesh) Rahbar Khan
- (Canada) Kembo Kibato
- (Canada) Lukas MacNaughton
- (Saint Vincent and the Grenadines) Tristan Marshall
- (Cameroon) Macdonald Ngwa Niba
- (Canada) Cyrus Rollocks
- (Israel) Fadi Salback

Women

- (Portugal) (Canada) Sierra Cota-Yarde
- (Guyana) (Canada) Raven Edwards-Dowdall
- (Canada) Nicola Golen
- (Canada) Jade Kovacevic
- (Philippines) (Canada) Ivymae Perez
- (Canada) Sarah Rollins
- (Canada) Lauren Rowe
- (Canada) Olivia Smith
- (Canada) Serita Thurton
