= AFC Toronto =

Women's soccer club in Toronto, Ontario

- Full name: Association Football Club Toronto
- Founded: April 26, 2023; 3 years ago
- Stadium: BMO Field, Toronto, Ontario; York Lions Stadium, North York, Ontario
- Capacity: BMO Field: 45,736; York Lions Stadium: 4,000
- CEO: Helena Ruken
- Head coach: Marko Milanović
- League: Northern Super League
- 2026: Regular season, 3rd Playoffs, champion
- Website: afctoronto.ca

AFC Toronto is a professional women's soccer club based in Toronto, Ontario, that competes in the Northern Super League, the top women's league of the Canadian soccer league system.

== History ==
In April 2023, AFC Toronto was established by a group of local soccer community members, including Helena Ruken, Brenda Ha, Jill Burgin, Billy Wilson, Mike Ruthard, Kamal Sandhu, and Shamez Mangalji. They became the third club to enter as a founding member of the Northern Super League, which launched its inaugural season in 2025. Although several of the founders held a connection with the North Toronto Nitros, including Ruken who serves as the Nitros President, AFC Toronto will operate as a separate entity. In January 2024, Canadian Olympic sprinter Andre De Grasse joined the club as an investor.

In June 2024, the club unveiled their official branding, maroon and vermillion serving as the team's colours, and their crest, which features a letter T at the centre symbolizing Toronto and mirrored 7s on either side representing the team's original seven founding members, as well as the city's original six boroughs plus the GTA. It was announced that the team would play at York Lions Stadium as their home venue for the 2025 season, sharing the venue with Canadian Premier League club York United FC and MLS Next Pro side Toronto FC II. In October 2024, Jade Kovacevic was unveiled as the club and league's first ever player signing.

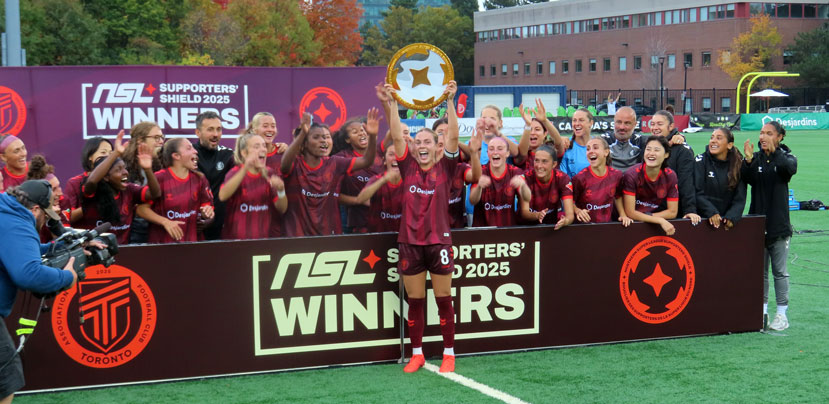
AFC Toronto celebrating Supporters Shield title in 2025

On April 19, 2025, they played their inaugural match, losing 1–0 to Montreal Roses FC, in front of 14,518 fans at BMO Field. They recorded their first victory on May 1, 2025, in a 2–1 victory over Calgary Wild FC. Toronto became the first team to qualify for the playoffs of the inaugural NSL season after their 7–0 victory over Vancouver Rise FC on September 13, 2025. In September 2025, Toronto won the NSL's inaugural Supporters’ Shield after clinching a finish at the top of the regular season table.

In October 2025, the club announced that they would participate in the seven-a-side World Sevens Football event in December, featuring eight women's clubs and a $5 million US prize pool. In November 2025, the club announced that, after playing two matches at BMO Field in 2025, they would split home matches between BMO Field and York Lions Stadium in 2026, with 7 matches at BMO Field and 6 matches at York Lions Stadium.

On March 4, 2026, the club announced that they would open an academy for players aged 14–18 in August 2026, replacing the Canada Soccer National Development Centre in Toronto, with Marc Maunder being named as the club's academy director.

== Honours ==
AFC Toronto honours
Type	Competition	Titles	Seasons
Domestic	Regular season	1	2025
Domestic	Playoffs	1	2026

== Players and staff ==
=== Players ===
As of July 8, 2026

Note: Flags indicate national team as defined under FIFA eligibility rules; some limited exceptions apply. Players may hold more than one non-FIFA nationality.

No.	Pos.	Nation	Player
1	GK	FIN	Sofia Manner
2	MF	CAN	April Lantaigne
3	DF	USA	Jordan Brewster
4	MF	JAM	Nikayla Small
5	DF	USA	Croix Soto
6	DF	CAN	Kaela Hansen
7	FW	CAN	Kaila Novak
8	MF	CAN	Samantha Chang
9	FW	NGR	Esther Okoronkwo
10	MF	CAN	Sarah Stratigakis
11	FW	CAN	Kaylee Hunter
12	MF	CAN	Zoe Burns
13	GK	POR	Sierra Cota-Yarde

No.	Pos.	Nation	Player
14	DF	CAN	Sarah Rollins
16	MF	CAN	Olivia Chisholm
17	MF	TAN	Nyota Katembo
18	GK	CAN	Sabrina D'Angelo
19	DF	CAN	Ashley Cathro
21	FW	USA	Mia Fontana
22	MF	SKN	Cloey Uddenberg
24	DF	CAN	Shelina Zadorsky
31	MF	USA	Colby Barnett
33	GK	CAN	Danielle Krzyzaniak
53	MF	GHA	Linda Owusu Ansah
77	FW	CAN	Lauren Rowe
94	DF	CAN	Victoria Pickett

Counts as a domestic player as she also holds Canadian nationality

=== Current staff ===
As of August 7, 2024

Executive
Chief Executive Officer	Helena Ruken
Chief Operating Officer	Kamal Sandhu
Vice-President, Brand and Partnerships	Kathleen Hegarty
Sporting Director	Billy Wilson
Coaching staff
Head coach	Marko Milanović
Assistant coach	Sylvia Forbes
Goalkeeping coach	Rasih Pala
Head Athletic Therapist	Karla Leong
Sports Science & Performance coach	Mariana Gonzalez Moreno
Athletic therapist	Kia Halsall
Equipment manager	Keyosha Donkor

=== Club captains ===
Years	Name	Nation
2025	Emma Regan	Canada
2026–present	Nikayla Small	Jamaica

== Supporters ==
AFC Toronto's supporters group is The Vermilion Vanguard. The supporters section is located in Section 900 of the York Lions Stadium, and for away matches The Vermilion Vanguard meets at Something in the Water.

== Managers ==
As of April 4, 2026:

Name	Tenure	Refs
(Serbia) / (Canada) Marko Milanović	7 August 2024 –	

== See also ==
- North Toronto Nitros
- Toronto Lady Lynx
- Toronto Inferno
