= 2014 FIFA U-20 Women's World Cup squads =

Football tournament squads

This article lists the squads for the 2014 FIFA U-20 Women's World Cup, held in Canada. Each competing federation was allowed a 21-player squad, which had to be submitted to FIFA.

== Group A ==
=== Canada ===
Coach: (Canada) Andrew Olivieri

No.	Pos.	Player	Date of birth (age)	Caps	Goals	Club
1	GK	Kailen Sheridan	16 July 1995 (aged 19)	4	0	(United States Soccer Federation) Clemson Tigers
2	DF	Sura Yekka	4 January 1997 (aged 17)	4	0	(Canadian Soccer Association) Brams United
3	DF	Kinley McNicoll (c)	17 April 1994 (aged 20)	4	0	(United States Soccer Federation) Wisconsin Badgers
4	DF	Kylie Davis	22 July 1994 (aged 20)	3	0	(United States Soccer Federation) Memphis Tigers
5	DF	Kadeisha Buchanan	5 November 1995 (aged 18)	4	0	(United States Soccer Federation) West Virginia Mountaineers
6	DF	Rebecca Quinn (Note: Nowadays known as Quinn)	11 August 1995 (aged 18)	4	0	(United States Soccer Federation) Duke Blue Devils
7	MF	Ashley Campbell	6 April 1994 (aged 20)	4	0	(United States Soccer Federation) Dayton Flyers
8	MF	Jessie Fleming	11 March 1998 (aged 16)	3	0	(Canadian Soccer Association) London NorWest SC
9	FW	Nichelle Prince	19 February 1995 (aged 19)	4	1	(United States Soccer Federation) Ohio State Buckeyes
10	MF	Ashley Lawrence	11 June 1995 (aged 19)	4	0	(United States Soccer Federation) West Virginia Mountaineers
11	FW	Janine Beckie	20 August 1994 (aged 19)	4	2	(United States Soccer Federation) Texas Tech Red Raiders
12	DF	Victoria Pickett	12 August 1996 (aged 17)	3	0	(Canadian Soccer Association) Glen Shields
13	DF	Lindsay Agnew	31 March 1995 (aged 19)	1	0	(United States Soccer Federation) Ohio State Buckeyes
14	MF	Vanessa Grégoire	4 June 1996 (aged 18)	0	0	(United States Soccer Federation) Princeton Tigers
15	DF	Jordane Carvery	2 September 1996 (aged 17)	0	0	(United States Soccer Federation) LSU Tigers
16	MF	Sarah Kinzner	28 August 1997 (aged 16)	0	0	(Canadian Soccer Association) Calgary Foothills
17	FW	Amandine Pierre-Louis	18 February 1995 (aged 19)	2	0	(United States Soccer Federation) West Virginia Mountaineers
18	GK	Marie-Joëlle Vandal	10 September 1995 (aged 18)	0	0	(Canadian Soccer Association) CS Lanaudiere
19	FW	Valérie Sanderson	16 March 1995 (aged 19)	4	1	(United States Soccer Federation) Memphis Tigers
20	MF	Emma Fletcher	4 February 1995 (aged 19)	4	0	(United States Soccer Federation) LSU Tigers
21	GK	Rylee Foster	13 August 1998 (aged 15)	0	0	(Canadian Soccer Association) Woodbridge School

=== Ghana ===
Coach: (Ghana) Bashir Hayford

No.	Pos.	Player	Date of birth (age)	Caps	Goals	Club
1	GK	Beatrice Nketia	14 February 1995 (aged 19)			(Ghana Football Association) Hasaacas L.F.C
2	DF	Rebecca Asante	16 October 1994 (aged 19)			(Ghana Football Association) Reformers L.F.C
3	DF	Grace Adams (c)	2 November 1995 (aged 18)			(Ghana Football Association) Reformers L.F.C
4	DF	Cynthia Yiadom	25 December 1994 (aged 19)			(Ghana Football Association) Fabulous L.F.C
5	FW	Veronica Appiah	28 June 1997 (aged 17)			(Ghana Football Association) Hasaacas L.F.C
6	DF	Ellen Coleman	11 December 1995 (aged 18)			(Ghana Football Association) Lady Strikers
7	FW	Sherifatu Wasila	30 November 1996 (aged 17)			(Ghana Football Association) Lepo Stars L.F.C
8	FW	Wasila Diwura-Soale	1 September 1996 (aged 17)			(Ghana Football Association) Hasaacas L.F.C
9	FW	Alice Danso	25 December 1994 (aged 19)			(Ghana Football Association) Police L.F.C
10	MF	Alice Kusi	12 January 1995 (aged 19)			(Ghana Football Association) Fabulous L.F.C
11	FW	Alberta Asante	19 December 1994 (aged 19)			(Ghana Football Association) La Ladies
12	FW	Christiana Boateng	6 September 1998 (aged 15)			(Ghana Football Association) Inter Royal L.F.C
13	MF	Jennifer Cudjoe	7 March 1994 (aged 20)			(Ghana Football Association) Hasaacas L.F.C
14	MF	Priscilla Okyere	6 June 1995 (aged 19)			(Ghana Football Association) Fabulous L.F.C
15	DF	Faustina Ampah	30 November 1996 (aged 17)			(Ghana Football Association) Blessed Ladies
16	GK	Victoria Agyei	15 May 1996 (aged 18)			(Ghana Football Association) Fabulous L.F.C
17	DF	Edem Atovor	10 April 1994 (aged 20)			(Ghana Football Association) Lady Strikers
18	MF	Rasheda Abdul-Rahman	28 November 1996 (aged 17)			(Ghana Football Association) Lepo Stars L.F.C
19	DF	Rita Darko	25 February 1996 (aged 18)			(Ghana Football Association) GT Mawena Ladies
20	MF	Fatima Alhassan	13 August 1996 (aged 17)			(Ghana Football Association) Hasaacas L.F.C
21	GK	Rose Baah	15 August 1999 (aged 14)			(Ghana Football Association) Samaria Ladies

=== Finland ===
Coach: (Finland) Marianne Miettinen

No.	Pos.	Player	Date of birth (age)	Caps	Goals	Club
1	GK	Vera Varis	20 January 1994 (aged 20)			(Football Association of Finland) FC Honka
2	DF	Tia Hälinen	18 February 1994 (aged 20)			(Football Association of Finland) FC Honka
3	DF	Emma Koivisto	25 September 1994 (aged 19)			(Football Association of Finland) FC Honka
4	MF	Tiia Peltonen	8 June 1995 (aged 19)			(Football Association of Finland) PK-35 Vantaa
5	DF	Katarina Naumanen	24 July 1995 (aged 19)			(Football Association of Finland) Pallokissat
6	MF	Sini Laaksonen	5 March 1996 (aged 18)			(Football Association of Finland) TPS Turku
7	MF	Iina Salmi	12 October 1994 (aged 19)			(Football Association of Finland) HJK Helsinki
8	MF	Emilia Iskanius (c)	14 April 1994 (aged 20)			(Football Association of Finland) Åland United
9	FW	Juliette Kemppi	14 May 1994 (aged 20)			(Football Association of Finland) Åland United
10	MF	Nora Heroum	20 July 1994 (aged 20)			(Football Association of Finland) Åland United
11	FW	Adelina Engman	11 October 1994 (aged 19)			(Football Association of Finland) Åland United
12	GK	Krista Moisio	17 April 1994 (aged 20)			(Football Association of Finland) NiceFutis
13	FW	Jenny Danielsson	30 August 1994 (aged 19)			(Football Association of Finland) FC Honka
14	DF	Paula Auvinen	24 September 1995 (aged 18)			(Football Association of Finland) Pallokissat
15	DF	Natalia Kuikka	1 December 1995 (aged 18)			(Football Association of Finland) Merilappi United
16	MF	Ria Öling	15 September 1994 (aged 19)			(Football Association of Finland) TPS Turku
17	FW	Sanni Franssi	19 March 1995 (aged 19)			(Football Association of Finland) PK-35 Vantaa
18	MF	Julia Tunturi	25 April 1996 (aged 18)			(Football Association of Finland) TPS Turku
19	MF	Tia-Maria Jaakonsaari	29 August 1994 (aged 19)			(Football Association of Finland) PK-35 Vantaa
20	MF	Erika Winter	12 March 1995 (aged 19)			(Football Association of Finland) Pallokissat
21	GK	Pauliina Tähtinen	11 April 1995 (aged 19)			(Football Association of Finland) Pallokissat

=== North Korea ===
Coach: (North Korea) Hwang Yong-bong

No.	Pos.	Player	Date of birth (age)	Caps	Goals	Club
1	GK	Kim Chol-ok	25 October 1994 (aged 19)			(DPR Korea Football Association) April 25
2	DF	Song Kyong-hui	23 August 1994 (aged 19)			(DPR Korea Football Association) Sobaeksu
3	DF	Choe Sol-gyong (c)	14 September 1996 (aged 17)			(DPR Korea Football Association) Rimyongsu
4	DF	Choe Yong-mi	11 November 1994 (aged 19)			(DPR Korea Football Association) Pyongyang City
5	MF	Kang Ok-gum	10 January 1994 (aged 20)			(DPR Korea Football Association) Amrokgang
6	DF	Kim Hyang-mi	1 September 1995 (aged 18)			(DPR Korea Football Association) Kalmaegi
7	MF	Choe Un-gyong	29 October 1995 (aged 18)			(DPR Korea Football Association) April 25
8	MF	Rim Se-ok	13 January 1994 (aged 20)			(DPR Korea Football Association) Amrokgang
9	MF	Ri Hyang-sim	23 March 1996 (aged 18)			(DPR Korea Football Association) Amrokgang
10	FW	Ri Un-sim	20 May 1996 (aged 18)			(DPR Korea Football Association) April 25
11	MF	Kim Phyong-hwa	28 November 1996 (aged 17)			(DPR Korea Football Association) Hwangryongsan
12	DF	Jon So-yon	25 July 1996 (aged 18)			(DPR Korea Football Association) April 25
13	MF	Kim Mi-gyong	4 September 1994 (aged 19)			(DPR Korea Football Association) Sobaeksu
14	DF	Ri Kum-suk	7 December 1995 (aged 18)			(DPR Korea Football Association) Sobaeksu
15	FW	Jo Ryon-hwa	13 January 1996 (aged 18)			(DPR Korea Football Association) Wolmido
16	DF	Ri Un-yong	1 September 1996 (aged 17)			(DPR Korea Football Association) Sobaeksu
17	MF	Choe Un-hwa	9 April 1997 (aged 17)			(DPR Korea Football Association) Ponghwasan
18	GK	Rim Yong-hwa	20 January 1996 (aged 18)			(DPR Korea Football Association) Sobaeksu
19	FW	Ri Kyong-hyang	10 June 1996 (aged 18)			(DPR Korea Football Association) April 25
20	FW	Kim So-hyang	2 January 1996 (aged 18)			(DPR Korea Football Association) Sobaeksu
21	GK	Jang Yong-sim	22 July 1995 (aged 19)			(DPR Korea Football Association) Wolmido

== Group B ==
=== Germany ===
Coach: (Germany) Maren Meinert

Melanie Leupolz sustained injury and was replaced by Joelle Wedemeyer.

No.	Pos.	Player	Date of birth (age)	Caps	Goals	Club
1	GK	Meike Kämper	23 April 1994 (aged 20)			(German Football Association) MSV Duisburg
2	DF	Manjou Wilde	19 April 1995 (aged 19)			(German Football Association) SC Freiburg
3	DF	Felicitas Rauch	30 April 1996 (aged 18)			(German Football Association) 1. FFC Turbine Potsdam
4	DF	Margarita Gidion	18 December 1994 (aged 19)			(German Football Association) SGS Essen
5	DF	Franziska Jaser	20 January 1996 (aged 18)			(United States Soccer Federation) NC State Wolfpack
6	MF	Lina Magull (c)	15 August 1994 (aged 19)	6	0	(German Football Association) VfL Wolfsburg
7	MF	Kathrin Schermuly	15 November 1995 (aged 18)			(German Football Association) Eintracht Wetzlar
8	DF	Rebecca Knaak	23 June 1996 (aged 18)			(German Football Association) Bayer 04 Leverkusen
9	FW	Pauline-Marie Bremer	10 April 1996 (aged 18)			(German Football Association) 1. FFC Turbine Potsdam
10	FW	Linda Dallmann	2 September 1994 (aged 19)			(German Football Association) SGS Essen
11	FW	Theresa Panfil	13 November 1995 (aged 18)			(German Football Association) Bayer 04 Leverkusen
12	GK	Merle Frohms	28 January 1995 (aged 19)			(German Football Association) VfL Wolfsburg
13	MF	Sara Däbritz	15 February 1995 (aged 19)			(German Football Association) SC Freiburg
14	DF	Marie Christin Becker	18 May 1995 (aged 19)			(United States Soccer Federation) Harvard Crimson
15	DF	Wibke Meister	12 March 1995 (aged 19)			(German Football Association) 1. FFC Turbine Potsdam
16	MF	Joelle Wedemeyer	12 August 1996 (aged 17)			(German Football Association) VfL Wolfsburg
17	MF	Jennifer Gaugigl	22 August 1996 (aged 17)			(German Football Association) FC Bayern München
18	FW	Lena Petermann	5 February 1994 (aged 20)			(United States Soccer Federation) UCF Knights
19	MF	Rieke Dieckmann	16 August 1996 (aged 17)			(German Football Association) SV Meppen
20	FW	Madeline Gier	28 April 1996 (aged 18)			(German Football Association) SGS Essen
21	GK	Anna Klink	22 March 1995 (aged 19)			(German Football Association) Bayer 04 Leverkusen

=== United States ===
Coach: (United States) Michelle French

No.	Pos.	Player	Date of birth (age)	Caps	Goals	Club
1	GK	Katelyn Rowland	16 March 1994 (aged 20)			(United States Soccer Federation) UCLA Bruins
2	DF	Christina Gibbons	30 December 1994 (aged 19)			(United States Soccer Federation) Duke Blue Devils
3	DF	Cari Roccaro (c)	18 July 1994 (aged 20)			(United States Soccer Federation) Notre Dame Fighting Irish
4	DF	Brittany Basinger	30 June 1995 (aged 19)			(United States Soccer Federation) Penn State Nittany Lions
5	MF	Rose Lavelle	14 May 1995 (aged 19)			(United States Soccer Federation) Wisconsin Badgers
6	MF	Taylor Racioppi	26 February 1997 (aged 17)			(United States Soccer Federation) PDA Slammers
7	FW	Savannah Jordan	24 January 1995 (aged 19)			(United States Soccer Federation) Florida Gators
8	FW	Summer Green	2 May 1995 (aged 19)			(United States Soccer Federation) North Carolina Tar Heels
9	FW	Makenzy Doniak	25 February 1994 (aged 20)			(United States Soccer Federation) Virginia Cavaliers
10	FW	Lindsey Horan	26 May 1994 (aged 20)			(French Football Federation) Paris Saint-Germain
11	MF	Rachel Hill	17 April 1995 (aged 19)			(United States Soccer Federation) UConn Huskies
12	MF	Mallory Pugh	29 April 1998 (aged 16)			(United States Soccer Federation) Real Colorado
13	MF	Carlyn Baldwin	17 March 1996 (aged 18)			(United States Soccer Federation) Tennessee Lady Volunteers
14	MF	Nickolette Driesse	8 November 1994 (aged 19)			(United States Soccer Federation) Florida State Seminoles
15	FW	Margaret Purce	18 September 1995 (aged 18)			(United States Soccer Federation) Harvard Crimson
16	DF	Stephanie Amack	23 December 1994 (aged 19)			(United States Soccer Federation) Stanford Cardinal
17	MF	Andi Sullivan	20 December 1995 (aged 18)			(United States Soccer Federation) Bethesda SC
18	GK	Jane Campbell	17 February 1995 (aged 19)			(United States Soccer Federation) Stanford Cardinal
19	DF	Kaleigh Riehl	21 October 1996 (aged 17)			(United States Soccer Federation) Braddock Road Youth Club
20	DF	Katie Naughton	15 February 1994 (aged 20)			(United States Soccer Federation) Notre Dame Fighting Irish
21	GK	Rosemary Chandler	24 September 1996 (aged 17)			(United States Soccer Federation) Penn State Nittany Lions

=== China PR ===
Coach: (China) Wang Jun

No.	Pos.	Player	Date of birth (age)	Caps	Goals	Club
1	GK	Lu Feifei	10 November 1995 (aged 18)			(Chinese Football Association) Jiangsu Huatai
2	DF	Yao Lingwei	5 December 1995 (aged 18)			(Chinese Football Association) Jiangsu Huatai
3	DF	Zhong Xiudong	16 November 1994 (aged 19)			(Chinese Football Association) Guangdong Haiyin
4	DF	Zhao Yingying	16 November 1996 (aged 17)			(Chinese Football Association) Dalian Shide
5	DF	Lu Siqi	4 January 1995 (aged 19)			(Chinese Football Association) Army Club
6	MF	Lei Jiahui	22 September 1995 (aged 18)			(Chinese Football Association) Henan Steel
7	MF	Liu Yanqiu	31 December 1995 (aged 18)			(Chinese Football Association) Wuhan Jiangda University
8	MF	Dong Jiabao	21 November 1996 (aged 17)			(Chinese Football Association) Henan Steel
9	FW	Zhang Chen	11 October 1995 (aged 18)			(Chinese Football Association) Beijing Baxy
10	MF	Tang Jiali	16 March 1995 (aged 19)			(Chinese Football Association) Shanghai Women
11	MF	Zhang Zhu	20 May 1996 (aged 18)			(Chinese Football Association) Beijing Baxy
12	DF	Li Xiang	2 May 1994 (aged 20)			(Chinese Football Association) Changchun Huaxin
13	DF	Li Mengwen	28 March 1995 (aged 19)			(Chinese Football Association) Jiangsu Huatai
14	MF	Tan Ruyin	17 July 1994 (aged 20)			(Chinese Football Association) Guangdong FC
15	MF	Shi Tianlun	8 June 1996 (aged 18)			(Chinese Football Association) Shanghai Women
16	MF	Zhao Xinzhai	8 January 1995 (aged 19)			(Chinese Football Association) Jiangsu Huatai
17	MF	Zhu Beiyan (c)	17 January 1994 (aged 20)			(Chinese Football Association) Shanghai Women
18	FW	Wang Shuang	23 January 1995 (aged 19)			(Chinese Football Association) Wuhan Jiangda University
19	FW	Xiao Yuyi	10 January 1996 (aged 18)			(Chinese Football Association) Shanghai Women
20	GK	Li Mengyu	6 June 1995 (aged 19)			(Chinese Football Association) Henan Steel
21	GK	Nan Yang	16 August 1995 (aged 18)			(Chinese Football Association) Zhejiang Hangzhou Xizi

=== Brazil ===
Coach: (Brazil) Dorival Bueno

No.	Pos.	Player	Date of birth (age)	Caps	Goals	Club
1	GK	Nicole	14 August 1995 (aged 18)			(Brazilian Football Confederation) Team Chicago Brasil
2	DF	Letícia Santos	2 December 1994 (aged 19)			(Brazilian Football Confederation) São José
3	DF	Thaynara	25 January 1995 (aged 19)			(Brazilian Football Confederation) CR Vasco da Gama
4	DF	Julia Bianchi	7 October 1997 (aged 16)			(Brazilian Football Confederation) Centro Olímpico
5	MF	Gabi	5 April 1994 (aged 20)			(Brazilian Football Confederation) São José
6	DF	Camila	10 October 1994 (aged 19)			(Brazilian Football Confederation) Kindermann
7	FW	Duda	18 July 1995 (aged 19)			(Brazilian Football Confederation) São Francisco
8	MF	Djenifer	25 June 1995 (aged 19)			(Brazilian Football Confederation) Kindermann
9	FW	Byanca	23 November 1995 (aged 18)			(Brazilian Football Confederation) Foz Cataratas
10	FW	Andressa (c)	1 May 1995 (aged 19)			(Brazilian Football Confederation) Kindermann
11	FW	Patrícia	29 April 1994 (aged 20)			(Brazilian Football Confederation) Foz Cataratas
12	GK	Letícia Izidoro	13 August 1994 (aged 19)			(Brazilian Football Confederation) São José
13	DF	Nágela	21 January 1995 (aged 19)			(Brazilian Football Confederation) Ferroviária
14	DF	Caroline	22 June 1995 (aged 19)			Unattached
15	MF	Gabi Lira	16 September 1994 (aged 19)			(Brazilian Football Confederation) Centro Olímpico
16	MF	Tipa	28 July 1994 (aged 20)			(Brazilian Football Confederation) Centro Olímpico
17	FW	Nenê	30 April 1994 (aged 20)			(Brazilian Football Confederation) Ferroviária
18	FW	Carol	28 October 1994 (aged 19)			(United States Soccer Federation) NJCAA
19	FW	Rafaela	23 September 1995 (aged 18)			(Brazilian Football Confederation) Ferroviária
20	FW	Gabrielle	18 July 1995 (aged 19)			(Brazilian Football Confederation) Kindermann
21	GK	Bussatto	4 May 1994 (aged 20)			(Brazilian Football Confederation) São José

== Group C ==
=== England ===
Coach: (England) Mo Marley

No.	Pos.	Player	Date of birth (age)	Caps	Goals	Club
1	GK	Lizzie Durack	20 May 1994 (aged 20)			(The Football Association) Everton
2	DF	Martha Harris	19 August 1994 (aged 19)			(The Football Association) Liverpool
3	DF	Hannah Blundell	25 May 1994 (aged 20)			(The Football Association) Chelsea
4	MF	Sherry McCue (c)	16 September 1994 (aged 19)			(The Football Association) Aston Villa
5	DF	Aoife Mannion	24 September 1995 (aged 18)			(The Football Association) Birmingham City
6	DF	Meaghan Sargeant	16 March 1994 (aged 20)			(The Football Association) Birmingham City
7	FW	Nikita Parris	10 March 1994 (aged 20)			(The Football Association) Everton
8	MF	Jessica Sigsworth	13 October 1994 (aged 19)			(The Football Association) Doncaster Rovers
9	FW	Beth Mead	9 May 1995 (aged 19)			(The Football Association) Sunderland
10	MF	Katie Zelem	20 January 1996 (aged 18)			(The Football Association) Liverpool
11	FW	Melissa Lawley	28 April 1994 (aged 20)			(The Football Association) Birmingham City
12	DF	Paige Williams	10 March 1995 (aged 19)			(The Football Association) Everton
13	GK	Megan Walsh	12 November 1994 (aged 19)			(The Football Association) Everton
14	MF	Jade Bailey	11 November 1995 (aged 18)			(The Football Association) Arsenal
15	DF	Ellie Stewart	2 November 1996 (aged 17)			(The Football Association) Liverpool
16	DF	Gabrielle George	2 February 1997 (aged 17)			(The Football Association) Everton
17	FW	Natasha Flint	2 August 1996 (aged 18)			(The Football Association) Manchester City
18	FW	Jessica Carter	27 October 1997 (aged 16)			(The Football Association) Birmingham City
19	MF	Abbey-Leigh Stringer	17 May 1995 (aged 19)			(The Football Association) Aston Villa
20	DF	Leah Williamson	29 March 1997 (aged 17)			(The Football Association) Arsenal
21	GK	Caitlin Leach	16 November 1996 (aged 17)			(The Football Association) Aston Villa

=== South Korea ===
Coach: (South Korea) Jong Song-chon

No.	Pos.	Player	Date of birth (age)	Caps	Goals	Club
1	GK	Min Yuk-yeong	9 June 1995 (aged 19)			(Korea Football Association) Hanyang Women's University
2	DF	Ahn Hye-in	16 October 1995 (aged 18)			(Korea Football Association) Uiduk University
3	DF	Kim Du-ri	2 March 1994 (aged 20)			(Korea Football Association) Ulsan College
4	DF	Kim U-ri	2 March 1994 (aged 20)			(Korea Football Association) Ulsan College
5	DF	Lee Su-bin	26 December 1994 (aged 19)			(Korea Football Association) Hanyang Women's University
6	DF	Hong Hye-ji	25 August 1996 (aged 17)			(Korea Football Association) Hyundai Info-Tech HS
7	FW	Jang Sel-gi (c)	31 May 1994 (aged 20)			(Korea Football Association) Gangwon Provincial College
8	MF	Lee So-dam	12 October 1994 (aged 19)			(Korea Football Association) Ulsan College
9	MF	Choe Yu-ri	16 September 1994 (aged 19)			(Korea Football Association) Ulsan College
10	FW	Lee Geum-min	7 April 1994 (aged 20)			(Korea Football Association) Ulsan College
11	MF	Kim In-ji	5 July 1994 (aged 20)			(Korea Football Association) Hanyang Women's University
12	MF	Lee Na-ra	21 November 1994 (aged 19)			(Korea Football Association) Yeoju University
13	MF	Oh Yeon-hee	17 July 1994 (aged 20)			(Korea Football Association) Uiduk University
14	FW	Jeon Hansol	24 January 1995 (aged 19)			(Korea Football Association) Yeoju University
15	MF	Park Ye-eun	17 October 1996 (aged 17)			(Korea Football Association) Dongsan Information Industry HS
16	DF	Ha Eun-hye	27 November 1995 (aged 18)			(Korea Football Association) Yeoju University
17	DF	Kim Hye-yeong	26 February 1995 (aged 19)			(Korea Football Association) Ulsan College
18	GK	Yoo Ga-eun	14 August 1995 (aged 18)			(Korea Football Association) Ulsan College
19	FW	Nam-gung Ye-ji	17 April 1996 (aged 18)			(Korea Football Association) Hyundai Info-Tech HS
20	MF	Kim So-yi	8 December 1995 (aged 18)			(Korea Football Association) Hanyang Women's University
21	GK	Oh Eun-ah	17 January 1994 (aged 20)			(Korea Football Association) Jeonbuk KSPO WFC

=== Mexico ===
Coach: (Mexico) Christopher Cuéllar

No.	Pos.	Player	Date of birth (age)	Caps	Goals	Club
1	GK	Cecilia Santiago (c)	19 October 1994 (aged 19)			(United States Soccer Federation) FC Kansas City
2	DF	Clarissa Robles	9 May 1994 (aged 20)			(United States Soccer Federation) UC Irvine Anteaters
3	DF	Estefanía Fuentes	2 August 1994 (aged 20)			(Mexican Football Federation) ITESM Puebla
4	DF	Paulina Solís	13 March 1996 (aged 18)			(Mexican Football Federation) Colegio Once Mexico
5	DF	Mariel Gutiérrez	6 August 1994 (aged 19)			(Mexican Football Federation) Andrea's Soccer
6	MF	Karla Nieto	9 January 1995 (aged 19)			(Mexican Football Federation) Galeana Morelos
7	FW	Tanya Samarzich	28 December 1994 (aged 19)			(United States Soccer Federation) USC Trojans
8	MF	Nancy Antonio	2 April 1996 (aged 18)			(Mexican Football Federation) Macro Soccer
9	FW	Luz Duarte	29 August 1995 (aged 18)			(United States Soccer Federation) Lady Jaguars
10	FW	Carolina Jaramillo	19 March 1994 (aged 20)			(Mexican Football Federation) CD Alamos
11	FW	Fabiola Ibarra	2 February 1994 (aged 20)			(United States Soccer Federation) Norwalk FC
12	GK	Emily Alvarado	9 June 1998 (aged 16)			(United States Soccer Federation) Texas Rush
13	DF	Rebeca Bernal	31 August 1997 (aged 16)			(Mexican Football Federation) ITESM Monterrey
14	DF	Greta Espinoza	5 June 1995 (aged 19)			(Mexican Football Federation) Juventus
15	DF	Mariana Cadena	13 February 1995 (aged 19)			(Mexican Football Federation) ITESM Monterrey
16	MF	Claudia Lopez	31 January 1994 (aged 20)			(United States Soccer Federation) Cerritos College
17	MF	Amanda Pérez	31 July 1994 (aged 20)			(United States Soccer Federation) Washington Huskies
18	FW	Taylor Alvarado	1 March 1995 (aged 19)			(United States Soccer Federation) Pepperdine Waves
19	FW	Jenny Chiu	25 September 1995 (aged 18)			(United States Soccer Federation) El Paso Galaxy
20	DF	Jaqueline Rodríguez	7 September 1996 (aged 17)			(Mexican Football Federation) Cefor Tequixquiac
21	GK	Ana Gabriela Paz	21 December 1995 (aged 18)			(Mexican Football Federation) ITESM GDL Preparatoria

=== Nigeria ===
Coach: (Nigeria) Peter Dedevbo

No.	Pos.	Player	Date of birth (age)	Caps	Goals	Club
1	GK	Sandra Chiichii	10 October 1997 (aged 16)			(Nigeria Football Federation) Ibom Angels
2	DF	Ebere Okoye (c)	3 December 1995 (aged 18)			(Nigeria Football Federation) Nasarawa Amazons
3	DF	Jiroro Idike	7 June 1996 (aged 18)			(Nigeria Football Federation) Delta Queens
4	MF	Asisat Oshoala	9 October 1994 (aged 19)			(Nigeria Football Federation) Rivers Angels
5	DF	Maryam Ibrahim	12 December 1995 (aged 18)			(Nigeria Football Federation) Nasarawa Amazons
6	DF	Sarah Nnodim	25 December 1995 (aged 18)			(Nigeria Football Federation) Delta Queens
7	FW	Loveth Ayila	6 September 1994 (aged 19)			(Nigeria Football Federation) Makwada Babes
8	FW	Courtney Dike	3 February 1995 (aged 19)			(United States Soccer Federation) Oklahoma State Cowgirls
9	MF	Patience Okaeme	21 June 1995 (aged 19)			(Nigeria Football Federation) Delta Queens
10	MF	Halimatu Ayinde	16 May 1995 (aged 19)			(Nigeria Football Federation) Amazons Queens
11	MF	Yetunde Adeboyejo	25 May 1996 (aged 18)			(Nigeria Football Federation) Bayelsa Queens
12	FW	Uchenna Kanu	20 June 1997 (aged 17)			(Nigeria Football Federation) Pelican Stars FC
13	FW	Yetunde Aluko	26 December 1995 (aged 18)			(Nigeria Football Federation) Sunshine Queens
14	MF	Osarenoma Igbinovia	5 June 1996 (aged 18)			(Nigeria Football Federation) Inneh Queens
15	DF	Ugo Njoku	27 November 1994 (aged 19)			(Nigeria Football Federation) Rivers Angels
16	GK	Ibijoke Sangonuga	20 December 1994 (aged 19)			(Nigeria Football Federation) Inneh Queens
17	DF	Victoria Aidelomon	11 December 1995 (aged 18)			(Nigeria Football Federation) Pelican Stars FC
18	DF	Gladys Abasi	28 December 1995 (aged 18)			(Nigeria Football Federation) Ibom Angels
19	FW	Chinwendu Ihezuo	30 April 1997 (aged 17)			(Nigeria Football Federation) Pelican Stars FC
20	FW	Uchechi Sunday	9 September 1994 (aged 19)			(Nigeria Football Federation) Rivers Angels
21	GK	Chiudo Ehiudo	19 June 1996 (aged 18)			(Nigeria Football Federation) Delta Queens

== Group D ==
=== New Zealand ===
Coach: (New Zealand) Aaron McFarland

No.	Pos.	Player	Date of birth (age)	Caps	Goals	Club
1	GK	Lily Alfeld	4 August 1995 (aged 19)			(New Zealand Football) Forrest Hill Milford
2	DF	Catherine Bott	22 April 1995 (aged 19)			(New Zealand Football) Forrest Hill Milford
3	DF	Megan Lee	7 February 1995 (aged 19)			(New Zealand Football) Forrest Hill Milford
4	MF	Evie Millynn	23 November 1994 (aged 19)			(New Zealand Football) Eastern Suburbs AFC
5	DF	Emily Jensen	22 August 1995 (aged 18)			(New Zealand Football) Forrest Hill Milford
6	DF	Meikayla Moore	4 June 1996 (aged 18)			(New Zealand Football) Coastal Spirit FC
7	MF	Hannah Carlsen	25 November 1995 (aged 18)			(New Zealand Football) Forrest Hill Milford
8	MF	Daisy Cleverley	30 April 1997 (aged 17)			(New Zealand Football) Forrest Hill Milford
9	FW	Martine Puketapu	16 September 1997 (aged 16)			(New Zealand Football) Three Kings United
10	FW	Emma Rolston	10 November 1996 (aged 17)			(New Zealand Football) Forrest Hill Milford
11	FW	Briar Palmer	1 July 1995 (aged 19)			(New Zealand Football) Forrest Hill Milford
12	FW	Stephanie Skilton	27 October 1994 (aged 19)			(New Zealand Football) Glenfield Rovers
13	MF	Isabella Coombes	5 November 1997 (aged 16)			(New Zealand Football) Claudelands Rovers
14	MF	Katie Bowen (c)	15 April 1994 (aged 20)			(New Zealand Football) Glenfield Rovers
15	DF	Megan Robertson	1 August 1995 (aged 19)			(New Zealand Football) Eastern Suburbs AFC
16	DF	Ashleigh Ward	18 August 1994 (aged 19)			(New Zealand Football) Glenfield Rovers
17	FW	Jasmine Pereira	20 July 1996 (aged 18)			(New Zealand Football) Three Kings United
18	FW	Belinda van Noorden	24 November 1994 (aged 19)			(New Zealand Football) Three Kings United
19	FW	Tayla O'Brien	6 July 1994 (aged 20)			(New Zealand Football) Forrest Hill Milford
20	GK	Corina Brown	1 February 1994 (aged 20)			(New Zealand Football) Lynn-Avon United
21	GK	Ronisa Lipi	27 August 1995 (aged 18)			(New Zealand Football) Waterside Karori

=== Paraguay ===
Coach: (Paraguay) Julio Gómez

No.	Pos.	Player	Date of birth (age)	Caps	Goals	Club
1	GK	Cristina Recalde	29 March 1994 (aged 20)			(Paraguayan Football Association) Universidad Autónoma de Asunción
2	DF	Jennifer Mora (c)	11 November 1996 (aged 17)			(Paraguayan Football Association) Cerro Porteño
3	DF	Laurie Cristaldo	4 May 1997 (aged 17)			(Paraguayan Football Association) Universidad Autónoma de Asunción
4	DF	Rosalía Godoy	30 June 1995 (aged 19)			(Paraguayan Football Association) Universidad Autónoma de Asunción
5	DF	Tania Riso	26 January 1994 (aged 20)			(Paraguayan Football Association) 12 de Octubre
6	MF	Soledad Garay	27 November 1996 (aged 17)			(Paraguayan Football Association) Universidad Autónoma de Asunción
7	MF	Karen Hermosilla	7 August 1995 (aged 18)			(Paraguayan Football Association) Cerro Porteño
8	MF	Fanny Godoy	21 January 1998 (aged 16)			(Paraguayan Football Association) Universidad Autónoma de Asunción
9	FW	Mirta Pico	8 February 1994 (aged 20)			(Paraguayan Football Association) CS Limpeño
10	FW	Tania Espínola	14 October 1996 (aged 17)			(Paraguayan Football Association) Universidad Autónoma de Asunción
11	FW	Jessica Martínez	14 June 1999 (aged 15)			(Paraguayan Football Association) Club Olimpia
12	GK	Alicia Bobadilla	5 June 1994 (aged 20)			(Paraguayan Football Association) CS Limpeño
13	DF	Belén Benítez	18 December 1995 (aged 18)			(Paraguayan Football Association) CS Limpeño
14	MF	Fabiola Ayala	16 April 1994 (aged 20)			(Paraguayan Football Association) Club Olimpia
15	FW	Verónica Kurtz	1 March 1996 (aged 18)			(Paraguayan Football Association) Cerro Porteño
16	DF	Sady Salinas	27 October 1994 (aged 19)			(Paraguayan Football Association) Universidad Autónoma de Asunción
17	FW	Silvana Romero	4 November 1994 (aged 19)			(Paraguayan Football Association) Club Olimpia
18	MF	Maribel Portillo	11 October 1995 (aged 18)			(Paraguayan Football Association) Club Olimpia
19	MF	Leda Portillo	23 January 1994 (aged 20)			(Paraguayan Football Association) Club Olimpia
20	MF	Fabiola Delvalle	8 May 1994 (aged 20)			(Paraguayan Football Association) CS Limpeño
21	GK	Natasha Martínez	17 July 2000 (aged 14)			(Paraguayan Football Association) Club Olimpia

=== France ===
Coach: (France) Gilles Eyquem

No.	Pos.	Player	Date of birth (age)	Caps	Goals	Club
1	GK	Romane Bruneau	27 August 1996 (aged 17)			(French Football Federation) Angers SCO
2	DF	Ève Périsset	14 December 1994 (aged 19)			(French Football Federation) Olympique Lyonnais
3	DF	Charlène Gorce	18 July 1994 (aged 20)			(French Football Federation) En Avant de Guingamp
4	DF	Aïssatou Tounkara	16 March 1995 (aged 19)			(French Football Federation) FCF Juvisy
5	DF	Griedge Mbock Bathy (c)	26 February 1995 (aged 19)			(French Football Federation) En Avant de Guingamp
6	MF	Aminata Diallo	3 April 1995 (aged 19)			(French Football Federation) En Avant de Guingamp
7	FW	Kadidiatou Diani	1 April 1995 (aged 19)			(French Football Federation) FCF Juvisy
8	MF	Sandie Toletti	13 July 1995 (aged 19)			(French Football Federation) Montpellier HSC
9	FW	Ouleye Sarr	8 October 1995 (aged 18)			(French Football Federation) Paris Saint-Germain
10	MF	Claire Lavogez	18 June 1994 (aged 20)			(French Football Federation) Montpellier HSC
11	FW	Lindsey Thomas	27 April 1995 (aged 19)			(French Football Federation) Montpellier HSC
12	DF	Aurélie Gagnet	30 December 1994 (aged 19)			(United States Soccer Federation) Kansas Jayhawks
13	DF	Marine Dafeur	20 October 1994 (aged 19)			(French Football Federation) En Avant de Guingamp
14	DF	Charlotte Saint Sans Levacher	20 May 1995 (aged 19)			(French Football Federation) Arras FCF
15	MF	Margaux Bueno	29 December 1995 (aged 18)			(French Football Federation) En Avant de Guingamp
16	GK	Solène Durand	20 November 1994 (aged 19)			(French Football Federation) Montpellier HSC
17	FW	Faustine Robert	18 May 1994 (aged 20)			(French Football Federation) Montpellier HSC
18	FW	Clarisse Le Bihan	14 December 1994 (aged 19)			(French Football Federation) En Avant de Guingamp
19	FW	Mylaine Tarrieu	3 January 1995 (aged 19)			(French Football Federation) Olympique Lyonnais
20	MF	Fanny Hoarau	6 July 1994 (aged 20)			(French Football Federation) Rodez AF
21	GK	Deborah Garcia	17 October 1994 (aged 19)			(French Football Federation) Rodez AF

=== Costa Rica ===
Coach: (Uruguay) Garabet Avedissian

No.	Pos.	Player	Date of birth (age)	Caps	Goals	Club
1	GK	Noelia Bermúdez	20 September 1994 (aged 19)			(Costa Rican Football Federation) Flores Heredia
2	DF	Yesmi Rodríguez	12 April 1994 (aged 20)			(Costa Rican Football Federation) UD Moravia
3	DF	Noelle Sanz	21 January 1995 (aged 19)			(United States Soccer Federation) Alabama Crimson Tide
4	MF	Viviana Chinchilla	21 December 1994 (aged 19)			(Costa Rican Football Federation) UCEM Alajuela
5	DF	María Coto	2 March 1998 (aged 16)			(Costa Rican Football Federation) UCEM Alajuela
6	DF	Fabiola Villalobos	13 March 1998 (aged 16)			(Costa Rican Football Federation) Arenal Coronado
7	FW	Melissa Herrera	10 October 1996 (aged 17)			(Costa Rican Football Federation) Deportivo Saprissa
8	DF	Mariana Benavides (C)	26 December 1994 (aged 19)			(Costa Rican Football Federation) Flores Heredia
9	FW	Michelle Montero	29 August 1994 (aged 19)			(Costa Rican Football Federation) UCEM Alajuela
10	MF	Gloriana Villalobos	20 August 1999 (aged 14)			(Costa Rican Football Federation) Deportivo Saprissa
11	FW	Katheryn Arroyo	13 December 1996 (aged 17)			(Costa Rican Football Federation) UCEM Alajuela
12	FW	Kimberly Lázaro	19 January 1994 (aged 20)			(Costa Rican Football Federation) Deportivo Saprissa
13	GK	Mariela Vásquez	11 July 1994 (aged 20)			(Costa Rican Football Federation) Arenal Coronado
14	DF	Anyi Barrantes	25 January 1996 (aged 18)			(Costa Rican Football Federation) UCEM Alajuela
15	MF	Michelle Rodríguez	10 October 1994 (aged 19)			(Costa Rican Football Federation) UCEM Alajuela
16	MF	Mayra Almazán	7 September 1994 (aged 19)			(Costa Rican Football Federation) PDA Slammers
17	FW	Jazmín Elizondo	16 December 1994 (aged 19)			(Costa Rican Football Federation) UD Moravia
18	GK	María Gloria Pardo	7 November 1997 (aged 16)			(Costa Rican Football Federation) Deportivo Saprissa
19	FW	Sofía Varela	28 March 1998 (aged 16)			(Costa Rican Football Federation) Fortuna de Desamparados
20	FW	Krista Chavarría	30 April 1994 (aged 20)			(Costa Rican Football Federation) Arenal Coronado
21	DF	María José Morales	22 February 1996 (aged 18)			(Costa Rican Football Federation) UD Moravia
