= 2012 CONCACAF Women's U-17 Championship squads =

This article lists the squads for the 2012 CONCACAF Women's U-17 Championship, to be held in Guatemala. The 8 national teams involved in the tournament were required to register a squad of 20 players; only players in these squads were eligible to take part in the tournament.

Players marked (c) were named as captain for their national squad. Number of caps, players' club teams and players' age as of 1 March 2012 – the tournament's opening day.

== Group A ==
=== Canada ===
Coach: Bryan Rosenfeld

No.	Pos.	Player	Date of birth (age)	Caps	Goals	Club
1	GK	Kailen Sheridan	16 July 1995 (aged 16)			(Canada) Pickering SC
2	DF	Lindsay Agnew	31 March 1995 (aged 17)			(United States) Ohio Premier Eagles
3	DF	Madeline Iozzi	5 March 1995 (aged 17)			(Canada) Pickering SC
4	FW	Summer Clarke	15 September 1995 (aged 16)			(Canada) Richmond Red Hot Selects U-16
5	MF	Quinn (Note: Then known as Rebecca Quinn)	11 August 1995 (aged 16)			(Canada) Erin Mills SC
6	MF	Sabrina Santarossa	1 February 1995 (aged 17)			(Canada) CS Vallée Richelieu
7	MF	Ashley Lawrence (c)	11 June 1995 (aged 16)			(Canada) Erin Mills SC
8	MF	Jasmin Dhanda	10 September 1995 (aged 16)			(Canada) Vancouver Whitecaps FC Girls Elite
9	FW	Amandine Pierre-Louis	18 February 1995 (aged 17)			(Canada) Saint-Leonard
10	FW	Valérie Sanderson	16 March 1995 (aged 17)			(Canada) FC Boisbriand U-16
11	FW	Nichelle Prince	19 February 1995 (aged 17)			(Canada) Pickering SC
12	DF	Kadeisha Buchanan	5 November 1995 (aged 16)			(Canada) Erin Mills SC
13	FW	Elissa Neff	16 December 1995 (aged 16)			(Canada) Vancouver Whitecaps FC Girls Elite
14	DF	Rebecca Pongetti	28 June 1995 (aged 16)			(Canada) Oakville SC
15	DF	Victoria Pickett	12 August 1996 (aged 15)			(Canada) Vancouver Whitecaps FC Girls Elite
16	DF	Carley Radomski	28 April 1995 (aged 17)			(Canada) Glen Shields
17	FW	Kajal Parmar	14 January 1995 (aged 17)			(Canada) Vancouver Whitecaps FC Girls Elite
18	GK	Taylor Bucklin	17 March 1995 (aged 17)			(United States) CFC United
19	DF	Nicole Loncar	19 June 1995 (aged 16)			(Canada) Brams United SC
20	DF	Larisa Staub	15 September 1995 (aged 16)			(Canada) Angels SWU

=== Guatemala ===
Coach: Benjamín Monterroso

No.	Pos.	Player	Date of birth (age)	Caps	Goals	Club
1	GK	Kimberly Castro	16 May 1995 (aged 16)			(Guatemala) Pares
2	DF	Andrea Peláez	8 June 1996 (aged 15)			(Guatemala) Muniguate
3	DF	Ivon Escobar	24 April 1996 (aged 16)			(Guatemala) Guastatoya
4	MF	Álida Argueta	27 January 1996 (aged 16)			(Guatemala) Xelajú
5	DF	Luisa León	5 May 1995 (aged 16)			Unattached
6	MF	Jennifer Barrios	10 June 1997 (aged 14)			(Guatemala) Quetzaltenango
7	DF	Nina Arzú	4 September 1996 (aged 15)			(Guatemala) Camp Elite
8	DF	Pamela Monterroso	8 June 1997 (aged 14)			(Guatemala) Camp Elite
9	MF	Celeste Gatica	31 October 1996 (aged 15)			(Guatemala) Pares
10	MF	Vivian Herrera (C)	6 May 1996 (aged 15)			(Guatemala) Pares
11	MF	Leslie Rosales	25 June 1995 (aged 16)			(Guatemala) Amatitlán
12	GK	Mariandre Rodas	14 April 1995 (aged 17)			(Guatemala) Legendarias
13	FW	Paula Ibargüen	31 January 1996 (aged 16)			(Guatemala) Camp Elite
14	MF	Alison García	14 October 1997 (aged 14)			(Guatemala) Unifut
15	MF	Rita Rodríguez	10 August 1995 (aged 16)			(Guatemala) Comunicaciones
16	DF	Maria Macal	29 April 1995 (aged 17)			Unattached
17	FW	Luz Gramajo	8 September 1995 (aged 16)			(United States)
18	DF	Silvia Reyes	18 September 1996 (aged 15)			(Guatemala) Quetzaltenango
19	FW	Nimsy Escobar	18 September 1995 (aged 16)			Unattached
20	MF	Stephanie Rodríguez	5 November 1995 (aged 16)			(Guatemala) Pares

=== Jamaica ===
Coach: Vinimore Blaine

No.	Pos.	Player	Date of birth (age)	Caps	Goals	Club
1	GK	Chris-Ann Chambers (c)	24 October 1995 (aged 16)			Unattached
2	MF	Jalen Simms	5 April 1996 (aged 16)			Unattached
3	DF	Georgia Bailey	25 January 1995 (aged 17)			Unattached
4	DF	Imanie Richards	19 July 1996 (aged 15)			(Jamaica) Harbour View
5	DF	Courtney Douglas	1 August 1995 (aged 16)			Unattached
6	DF	Tiffany Robinson	29 August 1996 (aged 15)			(Jamaica) Waterhouse
7	MF	Nicole Broderick	19 December 1995 (aged 16)			(Jamaica) Waterhouse
8	MF	Remona Hyde	24 September 1995 (aged 16)			(Jamaica) Los Perfectos
9	FW	Shantell Thompson	23 December 1995 (aged 16)			Unattached
10	MF	Shantel Bailey	30 April 1995 (aged 17)			(Jamaica) Waterhouse
11	MF	Khadija Shaw	31 January 1997 (aged 15)			Unattached
12	MF	Jorja Hughes	25 August 1997 (aged 14)			Unattached
13	DF	Shanay Ricketts	28 December 1997 (aged 14)			Unattached
14	DF	Mynairii Perkins	19 February 1995 (aged 17)			Unattached
15	FW	Oshay Lawes	27 June 1996 (aged 15)			Unattached
16	DF	Cachet Lue	26 March 1997 (aged 15)			Unattached
17	MF	Nasheka Doyley	7 October 1995 (aged 16)			(Jamaica) Los Perfectos
18	FW	Kayla Gray	10 October 1995 (aged 16)			Unattached

=== Panama ===
Coach: Luis Tejada

No.	Pos.	Player	Date of birth (age)	Caps	Goals	Club
1	GK	Karen Chavarría	24 June 1996 (aged 15)			(Panama) Estrellas Chiricanas
2	DF	Yerenis De León (c)	23 February 1995 (aged 17)			(Panama) Navy Bay
3	DF	Yomira Sanford	22 September 1995 (aged 16)			(Panama) Atlético Independiente
4	DF	Astrid Díaz	14 February 1995 (aged 17)			Unattached
5	DF	Katherine Castillo	23 March 1996 (aged 16)			(Panama) San Cristóbal
6	MF	Laurie Batista	29 May 1996 (aged 15)			Unattached
7	MF	Yaniska García	19 September 1997 (aged 14)			(Panama) Navy Bay
8	MF	Yanis Sanjur	9 May 1995 (aged 16)			(Panama) Estrellas Chiricanas
9	FW	Karla Riley	18 September 1997 (aged 14)			(Panama) San Cristóbal
10	FW	Marta Cox	20 July 1997 (aged 14)			(Panama) Chorrillo FC
11	MF	Kenia Rangel	6 August 1995 (aged 16)			(Panama) San Cristóbal
12	GK	Joselin Quintero	18 June 1995 (aged 16)			(Panama) Veraguas Nueva Generación
13	MF	Karla De La Rosa	19 October 1995 (aged 16)			Unattached
14	DF	Schiandra González	4 July 1995 (aged 16)			(Panama) Estrellas Chiricanas
15	MF	Génesis Samuels	15 February 1997 (aged 15)			(Panama) San Cristóbal
16	DF	Astrid González	28 June 1995 (aged 16)			Unattached
17	MF	Meybin Saavedra	29 September 1996 (aged 15)			(Panama) San Cristóbal
18	DF	Katherine González	9 April 1997 (aged 15)			(Panama) Estrellas Chiricanas
19	DF	Nicole Medianero	24 May 1995 (aged 16)			(Panama) Atlético Nacional
20	MF	Yassiel Franco	31 May 1998 (aged 13)			(Panama) Chorrillo FC

== Group B ==
=== Bahamas ===
Coach: Daria Adderly

No.	Pos.	Player	Date of birth (age)	Caps	Goals	Club
1	GK	Cori Strachan	8 April 1995 (aged 17)			
2	DF	Amari Bethel	31 January 1996 (aged 16)			
3	DF	Taj Dorsett	8 October 1998 (aged 13)			
4	DF	Shelby Carbin-Green	5 October 1995 (aged 16)			
5	MF	Dena Ingraham	14 August 1995 (aged 16)			
6	DF	Lindsay Seymour	6 February 1997 (aged 15)			
7	MF	Kennadi Green	31 January 1997 (aged 15)			
8	FW	Clayre Saunders	1 July 1996 (aged 15)			
9	FW	Akwah Thompson	6 April 1997 (aged 15)			
10	MF	Lauren Haven (c)	14 February 1995 (aged 17)			
11	MF	Tate Cuffy	3 June 1999 (aged 12)			
12	FW	Shekhinah Wells	1 August 1998 (aged 13)			
13	DF	Lian Haven	30 November 1998 (aged 13)			
14	FW	Joya Smith	30 May 1995 (aged 16)			
15	FW	Dawn Dean	1 October 1997 (aged 14)			
16	DF	Raunice Butler	22 April 1995 (aged 17)			
17	FW	Keisha McCartney	30 January 1997 (aged 15)			
18	GK	Sheryl Evans	31 January 1996 (aged 16)			
19	MF	Eden Taylor	26 November 1996 (aged 15)			
20	DF	Jodei Clarke	21 February 1995 (aged 17)			

=== Mexico ===
Coach: Leonardo Cuéllar

No.	Pos.	Player	Date of birth (age)	Caps	Goals	Club
1	GK	Ana Gabriela Paz	21 December 1995 (aged 16)			(Mexico) ITESM GDL Preparatoria
2	DF	Jaqueline Rodríguez	6 September 1996 (aged 15)			(Mexico) Centro de Formación Tequixquiac
3	DF	Jessica Valadez	24 November 1995 (aged 16)			(United States) Camarillo Eagles
4	DF	Greta Espinoza	5 June 1995 (aged 16)			(Mexico) Juventus Femenil Tijuana
5	DF	Paulina Solís	13 March 1996 (aged 16)			(Mexico) Colegio ONCE México
6	MF	Michelle González	20 July 1995 (aged 16)			(Mexico) U.N.A.M.
7	MF	Taylor Alvarado	1 March 1995 (aged 17)			(United States) Camarillo Eagles
8	MF	Karla Nieto	9 January 1995 (aged 17)			(Mexico) Club Galeana Morelos
9	FW	Luz Duarte	29 August 1995 (aged 16)			(United States) Tucson Mountain Lady Jaguars
10	FW	Jenny Chiu (c)	25 September 1995 (aged 16)			(United States) El Paso Galaxy
11	MF	Hallie Hernández	8 September 1995 (aged 16)			(United States) L.A. Blues
12	GK	Adela Meza	5 January 1996 (aged 16)			(Mexico) CEFOR Jaguares
13	DF	María Fernanda Pérez	12 January 1995 (aged 17)			(Mexico) Colegio ONCE México
14	DF	Celinna Montano	3 January 1995 (aged 17)			(United States) Beach F.C.
15	DF	Natalie Rivas	11 January 1995 (aged 17)			(United States) Real SO CAL
16	MF	Mariana Cadena	13 February 1995 (aged 17)			(Mexico) ITESM MTY Preparatoria
17	MF	Vivian Vega	3 May 1996 (aged 15)			(United States) Arsenal F.C.
18	MF	Cassandra Reyes	14 July 1995 (aged 16)			(United States) Legends F.C.
19	FW	Jessica Morales	29 February 1996 (aged 16)			(United States) San Diego Surf
20	MF	Cynthia Pineda	4 February 1995 (aged 17)			(United States) Chicago Fire Jr.

=== Trinidad and Tobago ===
Coach: (Norway) Even Pellerud

No.	Pos.	Player	Date of birth (age)	Caps	Goals	Club
1	GK	Lebrisca Phillip	28 January 1995 (aged 17)			Unattached
2	MF	Dennecia Prince	10 August 1998 (aged 13)			Unattached
4	FW	Liana Hinds	23 February 1995 (aged 17)			Unattached
5	DF	Adeka Spence	22 February 1995 (aged 17)			Unattached
6	DF	Khadisha Debesette	6 January 1995 (aged 17)			Unattached
7	MF	Diarra Simmons	11 September 1995 (aged 16)			(Canada) Pickering Power
8	MF	Victoria Swift	29 January 1995 (aged 17)			Unattached
9	FW	Zoe Swift	22 January 1997 (aged 15)			Unattached
10	DF	Marlique Asson	3 April 1995 (aged 17)			Unattached
11	FW	Khadidra Debesette	6 January 1995 (aged 17)			Unattached
12	MF	Rhonda Guiseppi	4 February 1996 (aged 16)			Unattached
13	DF	Shanisa Camejo	15 January 1995 (aged 17)			Unattached
14	MF	Emma Abdul	17 August 1995 (aged 16)			Unattached
15	DF	Nikkia Billouin	23 May 1995 (aged 16)			(United States) Baldwin Eagles Soccer Club
16	FW	Donika Murray	15 November 1995 (aged 16)			(Canada) Oakville SC
17	DF	Jonelle Warrick	14 March 1995 (aged 17)			Unattached
18	MF	Naomie Guerra	1 June 1996 (aged 15)			Unattached
19	FW	Anique Walker (c)	4 February 1995 (aged 17)			Unattached
20	GK	Khadijah De Freitas	24 May 1997 (aged 14)			Unattached
21	GK	Shantelle Christian	29 November 1995 (aged 16)			Unattached

=== United States ===
Coach: Albertin Montoya

No.	Pos.	Player	Date of birth (age)	Caps	Goals	Club
1	GK	Jane Campbell	17 February 1995 (aged 17)			(United States) Concorde Fire South
2	DF	Lizzy Raben	27 April 1995 (aged 17)			(United States) Colorado Rush
3	DF	Brittany Basinger	30 June 1995 (aged 16)			(United States) FC Virginia
4	FW	Amber Munerlyn	15 January 1995 (aged 17)			(United States) So Cal Blues
5	DF	Maddie Bauer	20 March 1995 (aged 17)			(United States) Slammers FC
6	DF	Gabbi Miranda	27 September 1995 (aged 16)			(United States) Colorado Rush
7	MF	Andi Sullivan	20 December 1995 (aged 16)			(United States) Bethesda SC
8	FW	Summer Green	2 May 1995 (aged 17)			(United States) Michigan Hawks
9	FW	Emily Bruder	18 February 1995 (aged 17)			(United States) Utah Avalanche
10	MF	Morgan Andrews (c)	25 March 1995 (aged 17)			(United States) FC Stars of Mass
11	MF	Morgan Stanton	2 April 1995 (aged 17)			(United States) Colorado Rush
12	MF	Joanna Boyles	13 November 1995 (aged 16)			(United States) Chelsea Ladies
13	FW	Darian Jenkins	5 January 1995 (aged 17)			(United States) Sparta SC
14	DF	Lauren Kaskie	18 September 1995 (aged 16)			(United States) Heat FC
15	FW	Maggie Purce	18 September 1995 (aged 16)			(United States) Freestate Soccer
16	DF	Mandy Freeman	23 March 1995 (aged 17)			(United States) Lady Renegades SC
17	MF	Sarah Robinson	28 April 1996 (aged 16)			(United States) MVLA Lightning
18	GK	Cassie Miller	28 April 1995 (aged 17)			(United States) Sereno FC
19	FW	Toni Payne	22 April 1995 (aged 17)			(United States) Concorde Fire
20	DF	Morgan Reid	13 June 1995 (aged 16)			(United States) Chelsea Ladies
