= 2012 CONCACAF Women's U-17 Championship qualification =

Concacaf CFU and UNCAF eliminations for the 2012 CONCACAF Women's U-17 Championship

== CFU ==
=== First CFU round ===
==== Group A ====
| Team | Pld | W | D | L | GF | GA | GD | Pts |
|---|---|---|---|---|---|---|---|---|
| (The Bahamas) Bahamas | 2 | 2 | 0 | 0 | 12 | 0 | +12 | 6 |
| Bermuda | 2 | 1 | 0 | 1 | 5 | 2 | +3 | 3 |
| Antigua and Barbuda | 2 | 0 | 0 | 2 | 0 | 15 | −15 | 0 |

| 14 August 2011 | Bahamas | 10–0 | Antigua and Barbuda | BFA National Centre, Nassau |
| 09:00 | Ingraham 5', 16', 30', 41', 75'; Green 22'; Smith 39'; Haven 49'; Thompson 77'; Carbin-Green 90+4' | | | Attendance: 650; Referee: Cardella Samuels Jamaica |

| 16 August 2011 | Antigua and Barbuda | 0–5 | Bermuda | BFA National Centre, Nassau |
| | | | Smith 32', 63', 66', 68', 89' | Attendance: 100; Referee: Sabina Charles-Kirton Saint Lucia |

| 18 August 2011 | Bahamas | 2–0 | Bermuda | BFA National Centre, Nassau |
| | Saunders 51', 75' | | | Attendance: 200; Referee: Cardella Samuels Jamaica |

==== Group B ====
| Team | Pld | W | D | L | GF | GA | GD | Pts |
|---|---|---|---|---|---|---|---|---|
| Trinidad and Tobago | 4 | 4 | 0 | 0 | 46 | 0 | +46 | 12 |
| Dominica | 4 | 2 | 0 | 2 | 7 | 18 | −11 | 6 |
| Saint Kitts and Nevis | 4 | 0 | 0 | 4 | 0 | 35 | −35 | 0 |

| 14 September 2011 | Trinidad and Tobago | 13–0 | Dominica | Larry Gomes Stadium, Malabar |
| | Walker 8', 68'; Debesette 16', 19', 37', 56'; Guerra 22'; Guiseppi 30', 81'; Simmons 54', 83'; Z. Swift 76'; Garcia 86' | | | Attendance: 300; Referee: Sabina Charles-Kirton Saint Lucia |

| 18 September 2011 | Dominica | 0–5 | Trinidad and Tobago | Windsor Park, Roseau |
| | | | Walker 5'; Debesette 15', 17', 89'; V. Swift 22' (pen.) | Attendance: 250; Referee: Cardella Samuels Jamaica |

| 25 September 2011 | Dominica | 5–0 | Saint Kitts and Nevis | Windsor Park, Roseau |
| | T. Bertrand 5', 29'; K. Bertrand 7'; Maximia 13'; Xavier 75' | | | Attendance: 200; Referee: Gillian Martindale Barbados |

| 28 September 2011 | Saint Kitts and Nevis | 0–2 | Dominica | Warner Park Sporting Complex, Basseterre |
| 08:00 | | | Seraphin 45'; Philip 90' | Attendance: 500; Referee: Deborah Zebeda Suriname |

| 2 October 2011 | Saint Kitts and Nevis | 0–11 | Trinidad and Tobago | Warner Park Sporting Complex, Basseterre |
| | | | Warrick 1', 19'; Asson 5'; Z. Swift 23', 50', 67'; V. Swift 43'; Debesette 55', 74', 76' (pen.), 87' (pen.) | Attendance: 500; Referee: Dianne Ferreira-James Guyana |

| 5 October 2011 | Trinidad and Tobago | 17–0 | Saint Kitts and Nevis | Warner Park Sporting Complex, Basseterre |
| | Walker 3', 4', 12', 14', 51', 59', 76'; Debesette 17', 22', 37', 44', 48'; Guiseppi 19'; Z. Swift 31', 85'; Forbes 49' (o.g.); V. Swift 68' | | | Attendance: 100; Referee: Sabina Charles-Kirton Saint Lucia |

==== Group C ====
| Team | Pld | W | D | L | GF | GA | GD | Pts |
|---|---|---|---|---|---|---|---|---|
| Guyana | 2 | 1 | 1 | 0 | 3 | 1 | +2 | 4 |
| Anguilla | 2 | 1 | 0 | 1 | 2 | 3 | −1 | 3 |
| (Curaçao) Curacao | 2 | 0 | 1 | 1 | 2 | 3 | −1 | 1 |

| 17 August 2011 | Guyana | 1–1 | Curaçao | Providence Stadium, Providence |
| 02:00 | Vaughan 52' | | Statia 37' | Attendance: 100; Referee: Gillian Martindale Barbados |

| 19 August 2011 | Curaçao | 1–2 | Anguilla | Providence Stadium, Providence |
| 02:00 | Stroop 64' | | Johnson 56'; Romney 70' | Attendance: 100; Referee: Deborah Zebeda Suriname |

| 21 August 2011 | Guyana | 2–0 | Anguilla | Providence Stadium, Providence |
| 02:00 | Primus 38'; Vaughan 61' | | | Attendance: 300; Referee: Gillian Martindale Barbados |

==== Group D ====
| Team | Pld | W | D | L | GF | GA | GD | Pts |
|---|---|---|---|---|---|---|---|---|
| Jamaica | 2 | 2 | 0 | 0 | 12 | 0 | +12 | 6 |
| Dominican Republic | 2 | 1 | 0 | 1 | 7 | 3 | +4 | 3 |
| Aruba | 2 | 0 | 0 | 2 | 0 | 16 | −16 | 0 |

| 25 August 2011 | Jamaica | 9–0 | Aruba | Estadio Panamericano, San Cristóbal |
| 02:30 | Shirley 2', 30', 47'; Bailey 39'; Thompson 43', 54', 60'; Broderick 65', 68' | | | Attendance: 50; Referee: Dianne Ferreira-James Guyana |

| 26 August 2011 | Dominican Republic | 7–0 | Aruba | Estadio Panamericano, San Cristóbal |
| 07:30 | Claudio 34', 88'; Chala de la Rosa 41'; Alcántara 44'; Peña 63' (pen.); Reyes 65'; Luitjes 69' (o.g.) | | | Attendance: 150; Referee: Shane De Silva Trinidad and Tobago |

| 28 August 2011 | Dominican Republic | 0–3 | Jamaica | Estadio Panamericano, San Cristóbal |
| 07:30 | | | Broderick 46', 75'; Bailey 90+3' | Attendance: 150; Referee: Dianne Ferreira-James Guyana |

=== Second CFU round ===
- (The Bahamas) Bahamas
- Trinidad and Tobago
- Guyana
- Jamaica

==== Group Final ====
| Team | Pld | W | D | L | GF | GA | GD | Pts |
|---|---|---|---|---|---|---|---|---|
| Trinidad and Tobago | 3 | 3 | 0 | 0 | 12 | 0 | +12 | 9 |
| Jamaica | 3 | 2 | 0 | 1 | 7 | 1 | +6 | 6 |
| (The Bahamas) Bahamas | 3 | 1 | 0 | 2 | 1 | 5 | −4 | 3 |
| Guyana | 3 | 0 | 0 | 3 | 0 | 14 | −14 | 0 |

| 29 November 2011 | Guyana | 0–8 | Trinidad and Tobago | Anthony Spaulding Sports Complex, Kingston |
| 08:00 | | | Asson 2'; Simmons 9', 43', 88', 89'; Walker 17'; Debesette 47', 71' | Attendance: 500; Referee: Gillian Martindale Barbados |

| 29 November 2011 | Jamaica | 2–0 | Bahamas | Anthony Spaulding Sports Complex, Kingston |
| | Thompson 8'; Shaw 89' | | | Attendance: 2200; Referee: Irazema Aguillera Cuba |

| 1 December 2011 | Trinidad and Tobago | 3–0 | Bahamas | Anthony Spaulding Sports Complex, Kingston |
| 08:00 | Warrick 4', 90+3'; Debesette 13' | | | Attendance: 400; Referee: Deborah Zebeda Suriname |

| 1 December 2011 | Jamaica | 5–0 | Guyana | Anthony Spaulding Sports Complex, Kingston |
| | Bailey 35', 80', 85'; Robinson 43'; Broderick 72' | | | Attendance: 1200; Referee: Sabina Charles-Kirton Saint Lucia |

| 3 December 2011 | Bahamas | 1–0 | Guyana | Harbour View Stadium, Harbour View |
| 08:00 | McCartney 43' | | | Attendance: 200; Referee: Irazema Aguillera Cuba |

| 3 December 2011 | Jamaica | 0–1 | Trinidad and Tobago | Harbour View Stadium, Harbour View |
| | | | Simmons 65' | Attendance: 2100; Referee: Gillian Martindale Barbados |

== UNCAF ==
=== First UNCAF round ===
| Team 1 | Agg. | Team 2 | 1st leg | 2nd leg |
|---|---|---|---|---|
| Costa Rica | 2–0 | El Salvador | 2–0 | 0–0 |
| Nicaragua | 1–8 | Panama | 0–6 | 1–2 |

== First leg ==
| 23 November 2011 | Panama | 6–0 | Nicaragua | Estadio Luis Ernesto Cascarita Tapia, Panama City |
| 09:00 | Sanjur 7'; De León 15'; García 27'; Riley 58'; Cox 59', 62' | | | Attendance: 278; Referee: Yesli Rivas El Salvador |

| 23 November 2011 | Costa Rica | 2–0 | El Salvador | Estadio Eladio Rosabal Cordero, Heredia |
| 09:00 | Durán 43' (pen.), 63' | | | Attendance: 596; Referee: Alicia Villatoro Guatemala |

== Second leg ==
| 26 November 2011 | El Salvador | 0–0 | Costa Rica | Estadio Cuscatlán, San Salvador |
| 08:00 | | | | Attendance: 189; Referee: Alondra Arellano Mexico |

| 27 November 2011 | Nicaragua | 1–2 | Panama | Estadio Nacional de Fútbol, Managua |
| 04:00 | Flores 81' | | Riley 22'; Cox 71' | Attendance: 117; Referee: Maria Castillo Costa Rica |

=== Final round ===
| Team 1 | Agg. | Team 2 | 1st leg | 2nd leg |
|---|---|---|---|---|
| Panama | 3–1 | Costa Rica | 1–0 | 2–1 |

== First leg ==
| 7 December 2011 | Panama | 1–0 | Costa Rica | Estadio San Cristóbal, David |
| 09:00 | Riley 87' | | | Attendance: 203; Referee: Alicia Villatoro Guatemala |

== Second leg ==
| 10 December 2011 | Costa Rica | 1–2 | Panama | Estadio Municipal Otto Ureña Fallas, San Isidro de El General |
| 09:00 | Durán 23' | | Sanjur 18'; Riley 80' | Attendance: 476; Referee: Yesli Rivas El Salvador |

- Panama qualified for the 2012 CONCACAF Women's U-17 Championship.
