= Nicole De Obaldía =

Panamanian footballer (born 2000)

Nicole de Obaldía
Personal information
- Full name: Whitney Nicole de Obaldía Ayala
- Date of birth: 16 March 2000 (age 26)
- Place of birth: Panama City, Panama
- Height: 1.54 m (5 ft 1 in)
- Position: Midfielder

Team information
- Current team: Pérez Zeledón

Senior career*
Years	Team	Apps	(Gls)
- Sporting San José
–2023	Herediano		
2023–	Pérez Zeledón		

International career
2021–	Panama		
- * Club domestic league appearances and goals

Whitney Nicole de Obaldía Ayala (born 16 March 2000) is a Panamanian footballer who plays as a midfielder for Costa Rican club AD Municipal Pérez Zeledón and the Panama women's national team. She is nicknamed Pinky.
