= S.F. Damaiense =

Portuguese football club

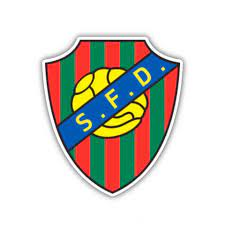
- Full name: Sport Futebol Damaiense
- Short name: Damaiense
- Founded: 1938
- Ground: Complexo Desportivo Municipal Monte da Galega; Damaia, Amadora, Portugal
- Capacity: 2,000
- Chairman: Sónia Santos
- League: II Divisão
- 2025–26: 10th, Liga BPI (relegated)
- Website: https://sfdamaiense.pt/feminino/
Home colours	Away colours

Sport Futebol Damaiense is a women's association football club based in Amadora, Portugal. It competes in Liga BPI, the top tier of women's football in Portugal.

== History ==
=== 2019–20 ===
Damaiense qualified for the promotion phase in the 2019–20 season, slated to compete in the southern zone, by finishing second in Series G. Manager Nuno Gomes did not consider Damaiense to be favorites due to its smaller budget compared to Paio Pires, Amora, and Torrense, calling both his team, Lordemão FC, and Atlético CP "outsiders" by comparison. However, the promotion qualification phase was cancelled in April due to the impact of the COVID-19 pandemic on sports.

As a compromise to the promotion series's cancellation, the Portuguese Football Federation announced in May 2020 that the winners of each 2019–20 series would be promoted to Liga BPI, increasing the top division's size from 12 teams to 20, and an additional relegation stage would be added to the league to relegate enough teams to rebalance the leagues. Although Atlético CP finished first in Series G over Damaiense, Damaiense was invited for promotion. Manager Nuno Gomes had left the team to take on a management role with Damaiense's lower-division men's side in April 2020, with former C.F. Benfica under-19 manager João Videira replacing him.

=== 2020–21 ===
Damaiense was the youngest club in the 2020–21 Liga BPI season, with an average player age of 20.4 years and including 17-year-old goalkeeper Adriana Rocha on loan from C.F. Benfica. Its first lineup of the season featured nine teenagers out of 11 starting players. Videra set maintenance as the club's goal for the season. The club's board supported the team's promotion by replacing its artificial-turf grounds with grass, 16 player signings led by Carolina Santana from C.F. Benfica, and new kits.

The club made its top-flight debut on 26 September 2020 with a 3–1 upset victory over C.F. Benfica followed by another victory over A-dos-Francos. The club also signed former Mexican international defender Paulina Solís on 4 October.

Damaiense ultimately finished the first series in 6th place, then failed to qualify for automatic maintenance by finishing 4th in the maintenance series, and then lost the relegation play-off 4–5 on aggregate to Gil Vicente to return to the Second Division. The club struggled with a lack of stable home grounds, playing at four different venues during the course of the season, leading manager Videira to suggest the team had never truly played a home match during the season. Videira resigned on 6 May 2021, and Damaiense appointed former Amora manager Ademar Colaço to serve as interim manager.

=== 2021–22 ===
Damaiense appointed men's team captain Filipe Costa, son of S.L. Benfica president Rui Costa, as the women's team coordinator after the end of the 2020–21 season. Costa resigned from agency KSirius to focus on the role, his first in women's football. The club retained Colaço as manager and expanded its youth programs, adding an under-19 women's team and recruiting for under-15 and under-17 sides.

The club won the 2021–22 Campeonato Nacional II Divisão in the final round, earning promotion back to Liga BPI for the 2022–23 season.

On 4 March 2022, the club appointed Tomás Tengarrinha as its new manager.

=== 2022–23 ===
Damaiense reinforced its roster for its return to the top flight with the signings of Beatriz Cameirão, Marta Ferreira, Raquel Ferreira, Melany Fortes, and Catarina Carmo, along with the return of Daniela Santos. The club also acquired American players Summer Green and Jorian Baucom, both previously of the National Women's Soccer League.

Damaiense opened the 2022–23 season with a win and a draw in its first two rounds, and a quarter-finals appearance in its first Taça da Liga Feminina campaign. It ended the season in fifth place to continue in Liga BPI, with Green leading the team in goals scored with 6.

== Roster ==
As of 15 May 2023

Note: Flags indicate national team as defined under FIFA eligibility rules; some limited exceptions apply. Players may hold more than one non-FIFA nationality.

No.	Pos.	Nation	Player
1	GK	CAN	Chandra Bednar
73	GK	POR	Irís Silva
99	GK	POR	Inês Dias
—	DF	POR	Mariana Lourenço
2	DF	POR	Sara Monteiro
3	DF	POR	Inês Matos
15	DF	POR	Ana Assucena
17	DF	SUI	Lorena Baumann
18	DF	POR	Laura Silva
20	DF	POR	Madalena Fernandes
22	DF	BRA	Gi Santos
23	DF	ESP	Andrea Mirón

No.	Pos.	Nation	Player
6	MF	POR	Patrícia Barreiros
7	MF	POR	Daniela Santos
10	MF	POR	Beatriz Cameirão (captain)
12	MF	CAN	Melanie Forbes
14	MF	USA	Carlyn Baldwin
77	MF	POR	Raquel Ferreira
4	FW	USA	Jorian Baucom
5	FW	USA	Summer Green
9	FW	ESP	Andrea Villar
13	FW	CPV	Melany Fortes
38	FW	POR	Marta Ferreira

== Records ==
=== Year-by-year ===
Legend:
Competition abandoned
Promoted
Qualified for promotion
Qualified for relegation
Relegated

Season	Competition	Div.											
Season	Competition	Div.	P	W	L	D	GF	GA	Pts.	Top goalscorer	Pos.	Women's Cup	League Cup
2018–19	D2 Series D	2	16	9	0	7	39	56	27	(Portugal) Vânia Marques (7)	4th	R2	—
2018–19	Promotion Series G	2	3	2	0	1	10	5	6		2nd	R2	—
2018–19	Promotion Cup	2	5	4	0	1	14	7	—	(Portugal) Sofia Amorim (4)	Finals	R2	—
2019–20	D2 Series G	2	12	9	1	2	26	10	28	(Portugal) Sofia Amorim (5)	2nd (Note: Damaiense qualified to compete for promotion by placing second in Series G, but was promoted instead of first-place team Atlético CP.)	R2	—
2019–20	South Series (Note: Abandoned due to the impact of the COVID-19 pandemic on sports.)	2	2	0	0	2	0	13	0	None	Abandoned	R2	—
2020–21	D1 South Series (Note: The top team from each 2019–20 series prior to the abandonment of Phase 2 was promoted.)	1	9	4	0	5	13	17	12	(Portugal) Lara Pintassilgo (4)	6th	R3	—
2020–21	South Maint.	1	10	5	0	5	14	12	15	(Portugal) Carolina Santana (9)	4th	R3	—
2020–21	Relegation play-off	1	2	1	1	0	4	5	—	(Brazil) Lorena Santana (3)	Relegated	R3	—
2021–22	D2 South	2	9	7	1	1	43	3	22	(Portugal) Cristiana Duarte (13)	2nd	R3	—
2021–22	Promotion Series	2	14	11	0	3	49	13	33	(Brazil) Lorena Santana (9)	1st	R3	—
2022–23	Liga BPI	1	22	10	6	6	35	34	36	(United States) Summer Green (6)	5th	QF	QF
2023–24	Liga BPI	1	22	11	4	7	31	33	37		4th		
2024–25	Liga BPI	1	22										
