= Tomás Tengarrinha =

Portuguese football manager (born 1991)

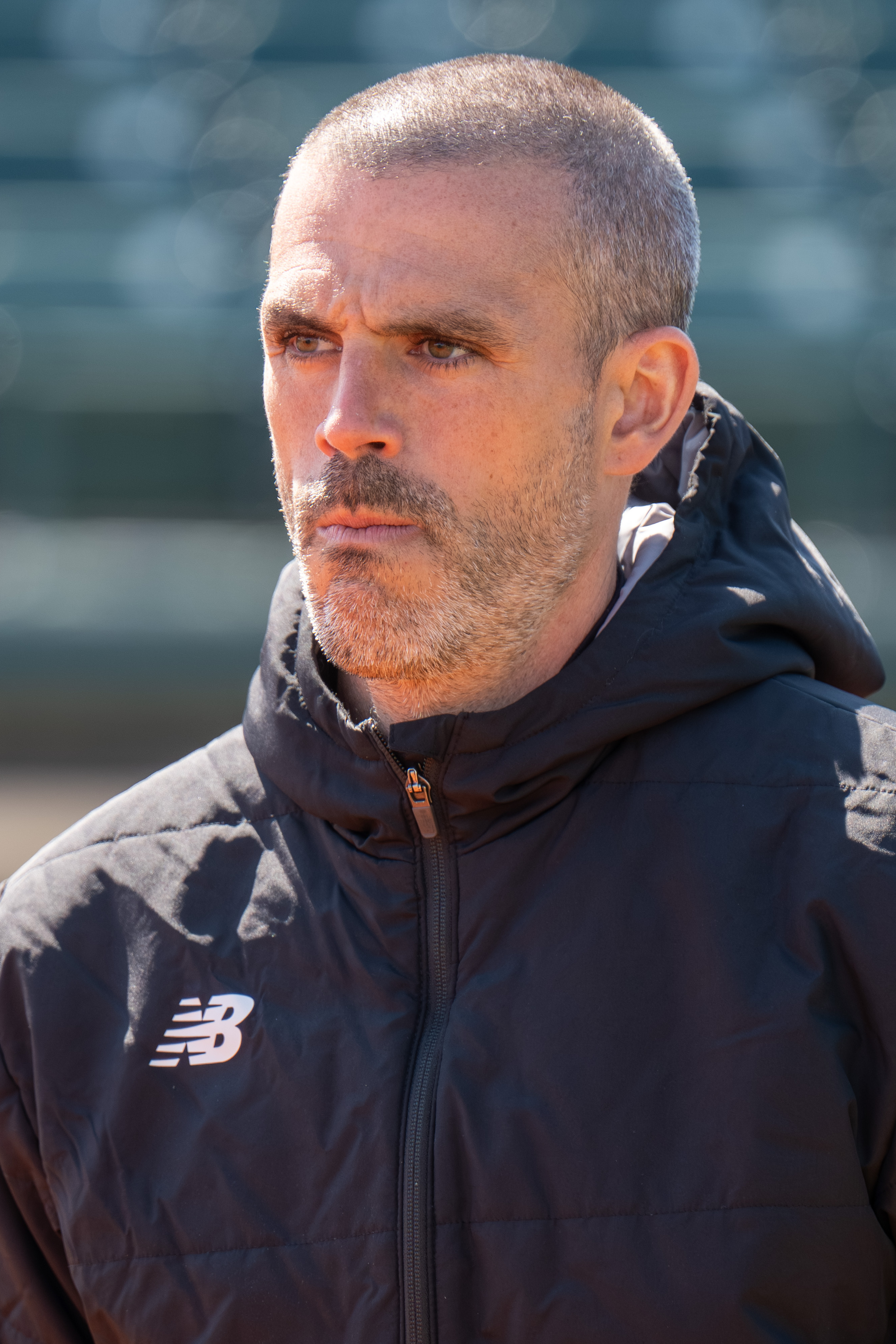
- Tengarrinha in 2026

Personal information
- Full name: Tomás de Campos Tengarrinha Soares Martins
- Date of birth: 21 May 1991 (age 35)
- Place of birth: São Sebastião da Pedreira, Portugal

Team information
- Current team: Episkopi (manager)

Managerial career
- Years: Team
- 2018–2019: Barreirense (men) (assistant)
- 2020–2021: Amora (women)
- 2021–2021: Torreense (women)
- 2022–2023: Damaiense (women)
- 2023–2024: Braga (women) (assistant)
- 2024: Braga (women)
- 2025: Damaiense (women)
- 2025–2026: Brooklyn FC (women)
- 2026–: Episkopi (men)

Tomás de Campos Tengarrinha Soares Martins (born 21 May 1991) is a Portuguese football manager for Greek Gamma Ethniki club Episkopi. He has previously managed Campeonato Nacional Feminino clubs Damaiense, Braga, and Torreense, in addition to USL Super League club Brooklyn FC.

== Career ==
Tengarrinha has worked on the coaching staff of FC Barreirense's men's team. He started working in women's football in 2020, leading Amora F.C.'s women's team to promotion to the Campeonato Nacional Feminino. In the 2021–22 season, he was the head coach of Torreense.

Tengarrinha then moved to Damaiense, which he also guided to top-flight promotion. Under Tengarrinha's guidance, Damaiense finished the Campeonato Nacional II Divisão Feminino season undefeated en route to its promotion. The following season, he coached Damaiense to a fifth-place finish in the club's first season in the Campeonato Nacional.

In July 2023, Tengarrinha was announced at S.C. Braga. Although he was touted as the club's new head coach, Tengarrinha was initially officially listed as an assistant coach due to his lack of sufficient coaching certification. In February 2024, Tengarrinha and his coaching staff at Braga were collectively terminated. Up to the point of his firing, Tengarrinha had led the club to third place in the Campeonato Nacional standings, winning 8 of 16 matches.

Tengarrinha returned to Damaiense in July 2024, this time as the club's sporting director. Three months later, he returned to coaching, assuming his old post as Damaiense manager following the departure of Thorlakur Arnason. Tengarrinha spent eight months at Damaiense before parting ways with the club in June 2025, one year before the slated expiration of his contract. He left Portugal having won 58 of the 109 games he managed since the start of his career.

On 5 August 2025, Tengarrinha was announced as the new head coach of USL Super League team Brooklyn FC. In his first game in charge, he piloted the team to a 2–1 win over reigning champions Tampa Bay Sun to open the season on a high note. Brooklyn then went winless for over two months before beating DC Power FC on 8 November 2025. After leading Brooklyn FC to finish the season in seventh place, below the playoff line, Tengarrinha was relieved of his duties in May 2026.

Greek Gamma Ethniki club Episkopi unveiled Tengarrinha as the team's new head coach on 22 September 2026.
