= 2012 CONCACAF Women's U-17 Championship =

2012 CONCACAF Under-17 Women's Championship

Tournament details
- Host country: Guatemala
- Dates: May 2–12
- Teams: 8 (from 1 confederation)
- Venue: 1 (in 1 host city)

Final positions
- Champions: United States (2nd title)
- Runners-up: Canada
- Third place: Mexico
- Fourth place: Panama

Tournament statistics
- Matches played: 16
- Goals scored: 72 (4.5 per match)
- Attendance: 8,408 (526 per match)
- Top scorer(s): (United States) Summer Green (12 goals)

The 2012 CONCACAF Under-17 Women's Championship was the third edition of the U-17 women's championship in football for the CONCACAF region. It was held in Guatemala City from May 2 to 12 in 2012.

The three best-placed teams qualified for the 2012 FIFA U-17 Women's World Cup held in Azerbaijan. All matches were played on artificial turf at the Estadio Cementos Progreso.

== Qualified teams ==
The qualification process for the 2012 tournament started on 14 August 2011.

Region	Method of qualification	Teams
Caribbean; Caribbean Football Union (CFU)	2011 Caribbean Football Union; Women's Under-17 Tournament	(The Bahamas) Bahamas; Jamaica; Trinidad and Tobago
Central America; Central American Football Union (UNCAF)	2011 UNCAF Women's; Under-17 Tournament	Panama
North America; North American Football Union (NAFU)	Automatic qualification	Canada; Mexico; United States
Host nation		Guatemala

== Group stage ==
All times are local (UTC−06:00).

Tie-breaking criteria

Teams were ranked on the following criteria:

1. Greater number of points in matches between the tied teams
2. Greater goal difference in matches between the tied teams (if more than two teams finish equal on points)
3. Greater number of goals scored in matches among the tied teams (if more than two teams finish equal on points)
4. Greater goal difference in all group matches
5. Greater number of goals scored in all group matches
6. Drawing of lots

Key to colors in group tables
Advanced to Semi-finals

=== Group A ===
Team	Pld	W	D	L	GF	GA	GD	Pts
Canada	3	3	0	0	16	1	+15	9
Panama	3	1	1	1	8	8	0	4
Jamaica	3	1	1	1	4	5	−1	4
Guatemala	3	0	0	3	2	16	−14	0

2 May 2012
14:00

Canada	6–0	Panama
Prince 6'; Dhanda 11'; Clarke 22', 40', 42'; Pierre-Louis 51'	Report

Estadio Cementos Progreso, Guatemala City
Attendance: 390
Referee: Quetzalli Alvarado (Mexico)
2 May 2012
16:30

Guatemala	0–3	Jamaica
	Report	Gray 13', 42'; Shaw 65'

Estadio Cementos Progreso, Guatemala City
Attendance: 390
Referee: Yesli Rivas (El Salvador)

4 May 2012
14:00

Jamaica	0–4	Canada
	Report	Sanderson 18'; Neff 21'; Clarke 55'; Prince 90+3'

Estadio Cementos Progreso, Guatemala City
Attendance: 1,100
Referee: Lucila Venegas (Mexico)
4 May 2012
16:30

Guatemala	1–7	Panama
Ibarguen 29'	Report	Riley 4', 36'; Batista 34', 73'; Franco 49'; Cox 61', 90+2'

Estadio Cementos Progreso, Guatemala City
Attendance: 1,100
Referee: Dianne Ferreira-James (Guyana)

6 May 2012
14:00

Panama	1–1	Jamaica
Cox 72' (pen.)	Report	Bailey 32'

Estadio Cementos Progreso, Guatemala City
Attendance: 475
Referee: Quetzalli Alvarado (Mexico)
6 May 2012
16:30

Guatemala	1–6	Canada
Herrera 28'	Report	Dhanda 23'; Clarke 31', 64'; Sanderson 77', 81', 90+2'

Estadio Cementos Progreso, Guatemala City
Attendance: 475
Referee: Annia Navarrete (Cuba)

=== Group B ===
Team	Pld	W	D	L	GF	GA	GD	Pts
United States	3	3	0	0	18	0	+18	9
Mexico	3	2	0	1	8	3	+5	6
Trinidad and Tobago	3	0	1	2	0	7	−7	1
Bahamas	3	0	1	2	0	16	−16	1

3 May 2012
14:00

Bahamas	0–10	United States
	Report	Purce 1', 75', 84'; Green 6', 40', 41', 44', 60'; Sullivan 55'; Payne 77'

Estadio Cementos Progreso, Guatemala City
Attendance: 61
Referee: Cardella Samuels (Jamaica)
3 May 2012
16:30

Mexico	2–0	Trinidad and Tobago
Hernández 32'; Duarte 40'	Report

Estadio Cementos Progreso, Guatemala City
Attendance: 61
Referee: Irazema Aguilar (Cuba)

5 May 2012
14:00

United States	5–0	Trinidad and Tobago
Bruder 20'; Sullivan 65'; Robinson 67'; Green 86'; Boyles 90+3'	Report

Estadio Cementos Progreso, Guatemala City
Attendance: 128
Referee: Alicia Villatoro (Guatemala)
5 May 2012
16:30

Mexico	6–0	Bahamas
Cadena 6', 43'; Morales 8', 13'; Vega 26'; Pineda 79'	Report

Estadio Cementos Progreso, Guatemala City
Attendance: 128
Referee: Gillian Martindale (Barbados)

7 May 2012
14:00

Trinidad and Tobago	0–0	Bahamas
	Report

Estadio Cementos Progreso, Guatemala City
Attendance: 184
Referee: Cardella Samuels (Jamaica)
7 May 2012
16:30

United States	3–0	Mexico
Green 16' (pen.), 32', 36'	Report

Estadio Cementos Progreso, Guatemala City
Attendance: 184
Referee: Michelle Pye (Canada)

== Knockout stage ==
All times are local (UTC−06:00).

The winners of the two semifinal matches and the winner of the third place match qualified for the 2012 FIFA U-17 Women's World Cup, held in Azerbaijan.

Semi-finals
10 May – Guatemala City
United States	7
Panama	0
10 May – Guatemala City
Canada	1
Mexico	0

Final
12 May – Guatemala City
United States	1
Canada	0
Third place
12 May – Guatemala City
Panama	0
Mexico	6

=== Semi-finals ===
10 May 2012
13:30

United States	7–0	Panama
Payne 9'; Green 44', 45+1', 53'; Andrews 50'; Jenkins 66'; Bruder 77'	Report

Estadio Cementos Progreso, Guatemala City
Attendance: 98
Referee: Gillian Martindale (Barbados)

10 May 2012
16:30

Canada	1–0	Mexico
Sanderson 13'	Report

Estadio Cementos Progreso, Guatemala City
Attendance: 98
Referee: Dianne Ferreira-James (Guyana)

=== Third place match ===
12 May 2012
13:30

Panama	0–6	Mexico
	Report	Morales 13'; Duarte 51', 54', 72', 84'; Hernández 65'

Estadio Cementos Progreso, Guatemala City
Attendance: 1,768
Referee: Irazema Aguilar (Cuba)

=== Final ===
12 May 2012
16:30

United States	1–0	Canada
Munerlyn 21'	Report

Estadio Cementos Progreso, Guatemala City
Attendance: 1,768
Referee: Alicia Villatoro (Guatemala)

== Winners ==
2012 CONCACAF Women's U-17 Championship

United States
Second title

== Goalscorers ==
12 goals

- (United States) Summer Green

6 goals

- (Canada) Summer Clarke

5 goals

- (Canada) Valérie Sanderson
- (Mexico) Luz Duarte

3 goals

- (Mexico) Jessica Morales
- (United States) Margaret Purce

2 goals

- (Canada) Jasmin Dhanda
- (Canada) Nichelle Prince
- (Jamaica) Kayla Gray
- (Mexico) Mariana Cadena
- (Mexico) Hallie Hernández
- (Panama) Laurie Batista
- (Panama) Marta Cox
- (Panama) Karla Riley
- (United States) Emily Bruder
- (United States) Toni Payne
- (United States) Andi Sullivan

1 goal

- (Canada) Elissa Neff
- (Canada) Amanda Pierre-Louis
- (Guatemala) Vivian Herrera
- (Guatemala) Paula Ibarguen
- (Jamaica) Khadija Shaw
- (Mexico) Cynthia Pineda
- (Mexico) Vivian Vega
- (Panama) Yassiel Franco
- (United States) Morgan Andrews
- (United States) Joanna Boyles
- (United States) Darian Jenkins
- (United States) Amber Munerlyn
- (United States) Sarah Robinson
