= Chris-Ann Chambers =

Jamaican footballer (born 1995)

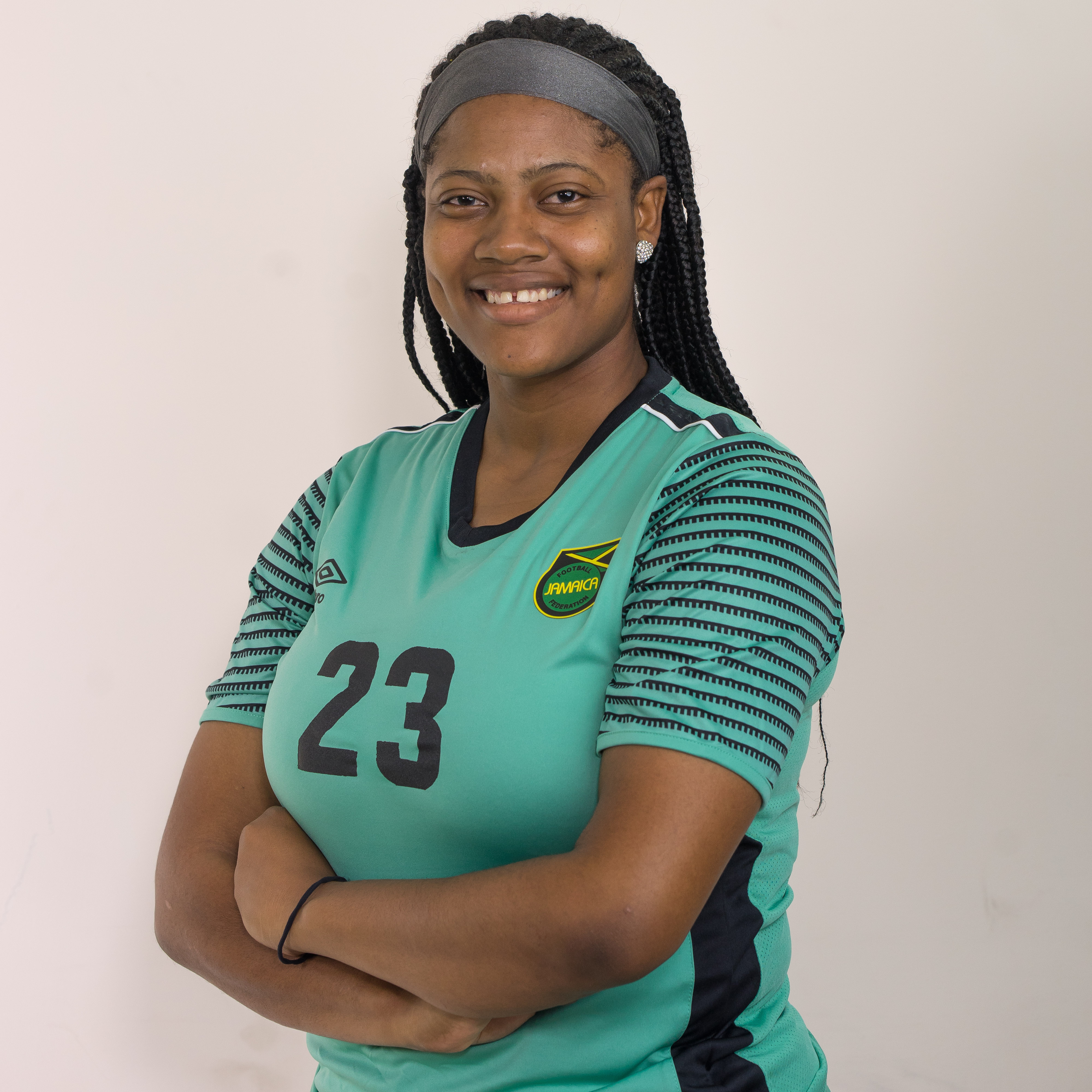

Personal information
- Full name: Chris-Ann Onessa Chambers
- Date of birth: 24 October 1995 (age 31)
- Place of birth: Kingston, Jamaica
- Position: Goalkeeper

Team information
- Current team: Dinamo Sokhumi

Senior career*
Years	Team	Apps	(Gls)
2012–2021	UWI	94	
- Dinamo Sokhumi

International career^{‡}
2010–2012	Jamaica U17	9	(0)
2018–	Jamaica	12	(0)
- * Club domestic league appearances and goals ‡ National team caps and goals as of 3 March 2019

Chris-Ann Onessa Chambers (born 24 October 1995) is a Jamaican footballer who plays as a goalkeeper for Georgian club FC Dinamo Sokhumi and the Jamaica women's national team.

== Early life ==
During her younger years, Chambers enjoyed track and field, netball and cricket, but her true calling was soccer. She was introduced to her greatest thrill of being competitively involved after she strolled through the gates of Wolmer's Girls School.

== International career ==
Chambers represented Jamaica at two CONCACAF Women's U-17 Championship editions (2010 and 2012).
