= Nágela =

Brazilian footballer (born 1995)

Personal information
- Full name: Nágela Oliveira de Andrade
- Date of birth: 21 January 1995 (age 31)
- Place of birth: Várzea da Roça, Brazil
- Position: Defender

Nágela Oliveira de Andrade (born 21 January 1995) is a Brazilian former footballer who played as a defender for Logroño in Liga F. After leaving Europe, De Andrade played for Gremio.
