= Clarissa Robles =

American-born Mexican footballer (born 1994)

Personal information
- Full name: Clarissa Marie Robles Quezada
- Date of birth: 9 May 1994 (age 32)
- Place of birth: Corona, California, United States
- Height: 1.60 m (5 ft 3 in)
- Positions: Right back; forward; midfielder

College career
| Years | Team | Apps | (Gls) |
| 2012–2015 | UC Irvine Anteaters | 68 | (0) |

Senior career*
| Years | Team | Apps | (Gls) |
| 2018 | LA Galaxy OC | 0 | (0) |

International career^{‡}
| 2014 | Mexico U-20 | 3 | (0) |
| 2017–2018 | Mexico | 1 | (0) |
- * Club domestic league appearances and goals as of 1 November 2015 ‡ National team caps and goals as of 4 February 2017

Clarissa Marie Robles Quezada (born 9 May 1994) is a former US-born Mexican footballer who played as right back. She has been a member of the Mexico women's national team.

== Club career ==
In July 2017, Robles was about to sign for Tigres UANL, but the rule of Liga MX Femenil at the time only allowed Mexican-born players to compete.

== International career ==
Robles represented Mexico at the 2014 FIFA U-20 Women's World Cup. She made her senior debut on 4 February 2017 in a friendly match against Canada.
