= Caitlin Leach =

English footballer

Personal information
- Full name: Caitlin Leach
- Date of birth: 16 November 1996 (age 29)
- Place of birth: Norwich, England
- Position: Goalkeeper

Senior career*
Years	Team	Apps	(Gls)
2016–2018	Bristol City	15	(0)

International career^{‡}
2014–2015	England U-19	9	(0)
- * Club domestic league appearances and goals as of 24 November 2016 ‡ National team caps and goals as of 24 November 2016

Caitlin Leach (born 16 November 1996) is an English footballer who played in the goalkeeper position for Bristol City. She has represented England on the under-19 national team.

== Playing career ==
=== Bristol City, 2016–2018 ===
Leach signed with Bristol City in January 2016 ahead of the 2016 FA WSL season. She made 15 appearances for the team and helped secure a second-place result with a 10–3–3 record and promotion to FA WSL 1. During a match against rival Everton Ladies, Leach's stoppage-time penalty kick save helped seal the team's promotion to FA WSL 1. on 5 February 2018 it was confirmed that Leach had left the Women's Super League One club by mutual consent.

=== International ===
Leach has represented England on the under-19 national team. Following her performance at the U-19 Euros, Leach was named to the squad of the tournament.

== Honours ==
with Bristol City

- FA WSL 2 Runner-up: 2015
