= Lu Feifei =

Chinese footballer

Personal information
- Full name: Lu Feifei
- Date of birth: 10 November 1995 (age 30)
- Place of birth: China
- Position: Goalkeeper

Senior career*
Years	Team	Apps	(Gls)
- Jiangsu Suning

International career^{‡}
2011	China U16	?	(0)
2012	China U17	3	(0)
2013	China U19	?	(0)
2014	China U20	3	(0)
2017–2018	China	4	(1)
- * Club domestic league appearances and goals ‡ National team caps and goals as of 7 March 2018

Lu Feifei (born 10 November 1995) is a Chinese footballer who plays as a goalkeeper. She has been a member of the China women's national team.
