= Soledad Garay =

Paraguayan footballer (born 1996)

Personal information
- Full name: María Soledad Garay Cabrera
- Date of birth: 27 November 1996 (age 29)
- Height: 1.63 m (5 ft 4 in)
- Position: Midfielder

Team information
- Current team: Club Cerro Porteño
- Number: 8

Senior career*
Years	Team	Apps	(Gls)
–2015	UAA		
2016–2021	Deportivo Capiatá		
2022-2023	Club Cerro Porteño	28	(7)

International career^{‡}
2014	Paraguay U20	3	(0)
2018–	Paraguay	2	(0)
- * Club domestic league appearances and goals ‡ National team caps and goals as of 8 October 2019

María Soledad Garay Cabrera (born 27 November 1996), known as Soledad Garay, is a Paraguayan footballer who plays as a midfielder for Club Cerro Porteño and the Paraguay women's national team.

== International career ==
Garay represented Paraguay at the 2014 FIFA U-20 Women's World Cup. At the senior level, she played the 2018 Copa América Femenina. 2019 Fecha FIFA Venezuela vs Paraguay, and the 2021 Fecha FIFA Japón vs Paraguay.
