= Ronisa Lipi =

Samoan footballer (born 1995)

Ronisa Lipi (born 27 August 1995) is a Samoan footballer who has represented both Samoa and New Zealand internationally. She plays as a goalkeeper.

Lipi was born in American Samoa and grew up in Lufilufi, Samoa. She moved to New Zealand at the age of 13, where she was educated at Wellington East Girls' College. She played for Waterside Karori, and for Wellington East school. Since 2018 she has played for Wellington United.

In 2012 she was selected for the New Zealand under-17 national team for the 2012 OFC Women's Under 17 Qualifying Tournament and 2012 FIFA U-17 Women's World Cup. In 2014 she was named to the New Zealand U20 for the 2014 FIFA U-20 Women's World Cup.

In November 2018 she was selected for the Samoa national team for the 2018 OFC Women's Nations Cup. In June 2019 she was named to the squad for the 2019 Pacific Games. In July 2022 she was named to the squad for the 2022 OFC Women's Nations Cup.
