= Margaux Bueno =

French footballer (born 1995)

Personal information
- Date of birth: 29 December 1995 (age 30)
- Place of birth: Carpentras, France
- Height: 1.58 m (5 ft 2 in)
- Position: Midfielder

Youth career
- 2001–2003: FC Saint-Pons-de-Mauchiens
- 2003–2005: FC Saint-Pargoire
- 2005–2008: ES Paulhan
- 2008–2013: Montpellier

Senior career*
Years	Team	Apps	(Gls)
2010	Montpellier B	1	(0)
2013–2018	EA Guingamp	81	(1)
2018–2019	Grenoble	21	(1)
2019–2020	Rodez	12	(1)
2020–2024	Nantes	33	(2)

International career
2014	France U19	6	(0)
2014	France U20	6	(0)
Medal record
Women's football
Representing France
FIFA U-20 Women's World Cup
Bronze medal – third place	2014 Canada
- * Club domestic league appearances and goals

Margaux Bueno (born 29 December 1995), is a former French professional footballer who played as a midfielder.
