= Várzea da Roça =

Coordinates: 11°36′25″S 40°08′13″W

- Municipality
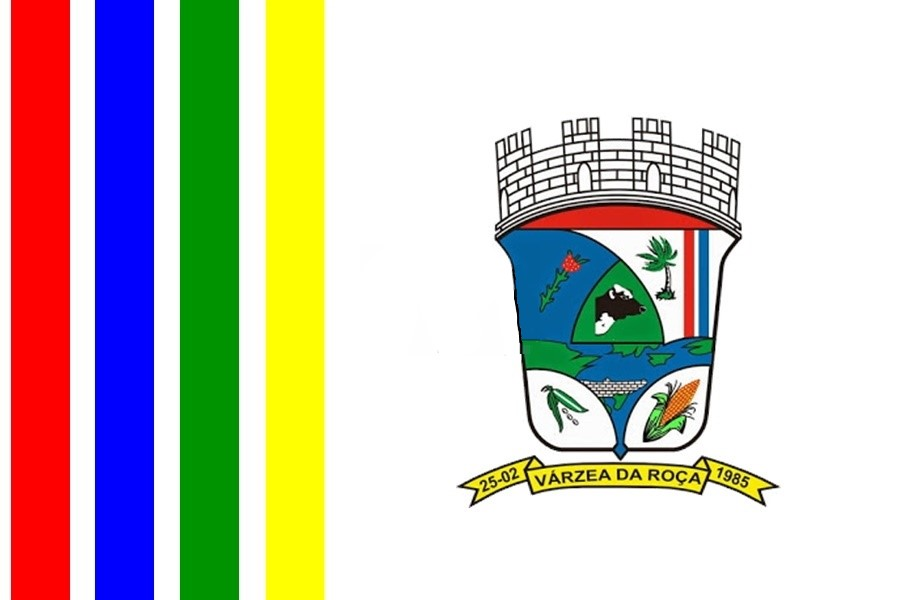
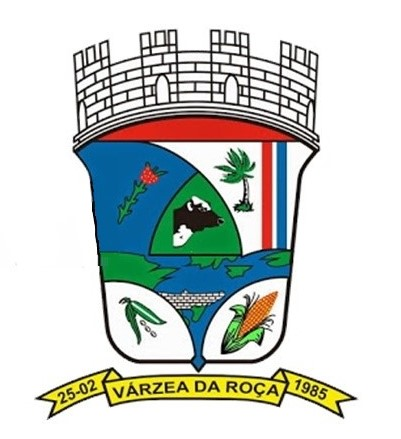
- Flag Coat of arms
- Interactive map of Várzea da Roça
- Country: Brazil
- Region: Nordeste
- State: Bahia

Population (2020)
  - Total: 14,121 (estimate)
- Time zone: UTC−3 (BRT)
- Website: varzeadaroca.ba.gov.br

Várzea da Roça is a municipality in the state of Bahia in the North-East region of Brazil.

== See also ==
- List of municipalities in Bahia
