= Margarita Gidion =

German footballer

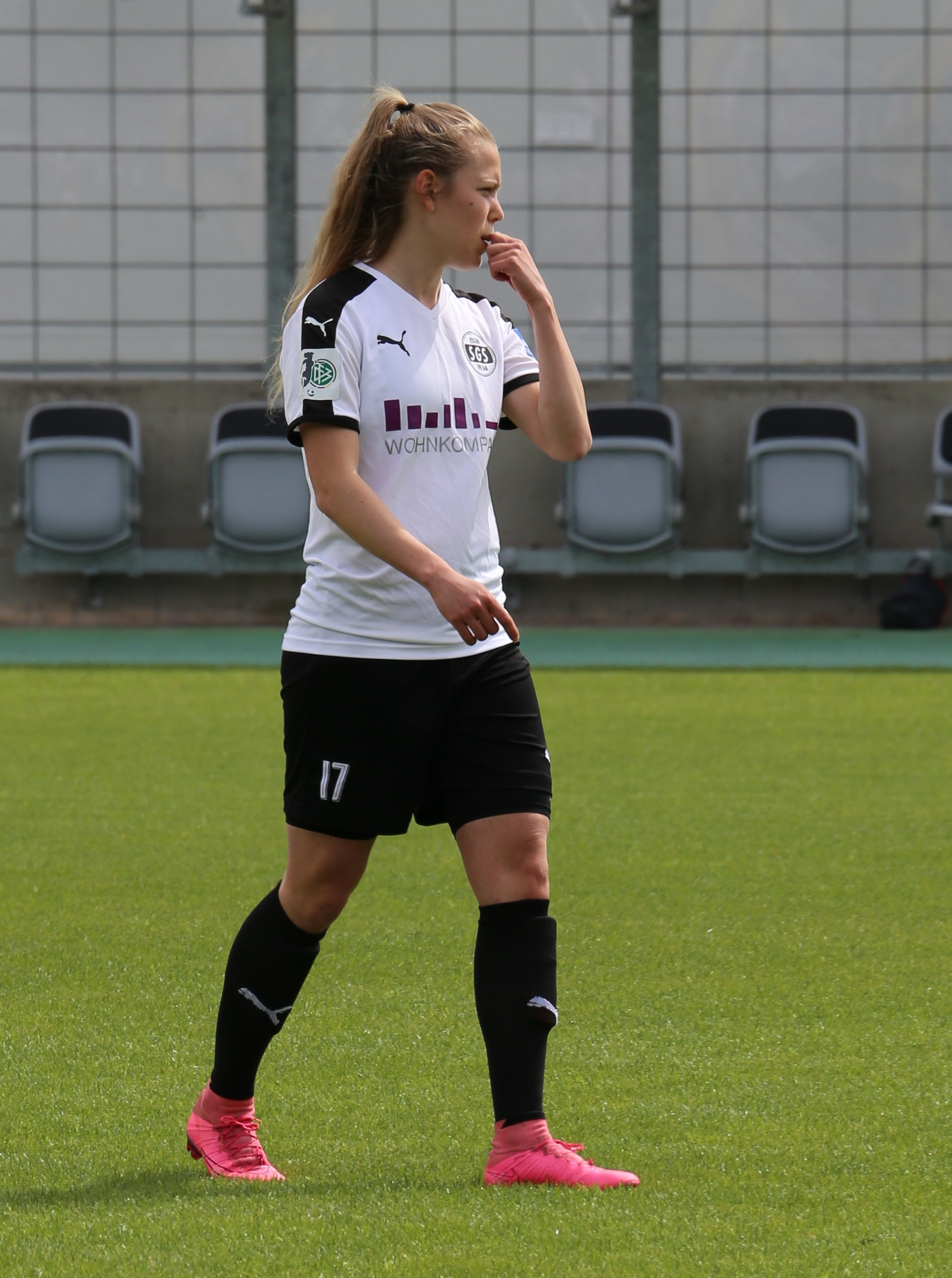
- Gidion in 2017

Personal information
- Full name: Margarita Gidion
- Date of birth: 18 December 1994 (age 31)
- Place of birth: Lörrach, Germany
- Height: 1.68 m (5 ft 6 in)
- Position: Midfielder

Senior career*
Years	Team	Apps	(Gls)
2011–2014	SC Freiburg	20	(3)
2014–2017	SGS Essen	46	(7)
2017–2020	Eintracht Frankfurt	36	(3)
2018–2020	Eintracht Frankfurt II	10	(3)
2020–2023	Werder Bremen	43	(4)
2023–2024	Basel	16	(1)
2024–2026	Viktoria Berlin	21	(1)

International career
2015	Germany	3	(0)
- * Club domestic league appearances and goals as of 12 July 2026

Margarita Gidion (born 18 December 1994) is a German footballer who plays as a midfielder. She made two appearances for the Germany national team in 2015.

== Career ==
In January 2023, Gidion left Frauen-Bundesliga club Werder Bremen to join Swiss Women's Super League side FC Basel.
