= Yerenis De León =

Panamanian footballer (born 1995)

Personal information
- Full name: Yerenis Yisel De León Batista
- Date of birth: 23 February 1995 (age 31)
- Position: Defender

Team information
- Current team: Pozoalbense

Senior career*
Years	Team	Apps	(Gls)
–2019	Universitario		
2020	Carneras UPS		
2021–	Pozoalbense		

International career^{‡}
2013–	Panama	6	(0)
- * Club domestic league appearances and goals ‡ National team caps and goals as of 9 July 2019

Yerenis Yisel De León Batista (born 23 February 1995) is a Panamanian footballer who plays as a defender for Spanish club CD Pozoalbense and the Panama women's national team.

== See also ==
- List of Panama women's international footballers
