= Victoria Swift =

Trinidadian footballer

Personal information
- Full name: Victoria Priscilla Swift
- Date of birth: 29 January 1995 (age 31)
- Place of birth: San Fernando, Trinidad and Tobago
- Height: 1.75 m (5 ft 9 in)
- Position: Defender

Youth career
- Waterloo Starlets

College career
Years	Team	Apps	(Gls)
2015–2016	Navarro Bulldogs		
2017–2018	West Florida Argonauts	45	(4)

Senior career*
Years	Team	Apps	(Gls)
2016–2017	FC Dallas		
2019	Fjarðabyggð/Hött/Leikni	11	(0)
2021–2022	León	23	(0)
2022	Carmen București		
2023	Electric City FC	8	(0)

International career^{‡}
2008–2010	Trinidad and Tobago U15		
2010–2012	Trinidad and Tobago U17	8	(3)
2009–2010	Trinidad and Tobago U20	4	(0)
2011–	Trinidad and Tobago	28	(0)
- * Club domestic league appearances and goals as of July 25, 2023 ‡ National team caps and goals as of 11:02, April 18, 2026 (UTC)

Victoria Priscilla Swift (born 29 January 1995) is a Trinidadian footballer who plays as a defender for the Trinidad and Tobago women's national team.

== Early life, family ==
Swift played youth soccer with Waterloo Starlets. In May 2012, she received an award from the Waterloo Institute of Soccer Players. Her older sister, Daystar Swift, is a Trinidad and Tobago netball international.

== College career ==
In 2015, Swift began attending Navarro College, where she played for the women's soccer team. In 2015, she was named to the Region XIV All-Conference First Team and in 2016 was named an All-Conference Honorable Mention.

In 2017, she transferred to the University of West Florida and played for the women's soccer team. She scored her first goal and added her first assist on September 6, 2017, against the Albany State Golden Rams. In 2018, she was named to the All-GSC Second Team.

== Club career ==
In 2016, she joined FC Dallas of the Women's Premier Soccer League. At the end of the season, she was named a WPSL All-Star. In December 2016, she re-signed with the club for the 2017 season.

In 2019, she signed with Icelandic club Fjarðabyggð/Hött/Leikni. That season, she was named to the Team of the Year. In February 2020, she re-signed with the club. She was not able to make it back to the team for the 2020 season due to travel restrictions caused by the COVID-19 pandemic.

In August 2021, she signed with Mexican club León in the Liga MX Femenil. She was initially recruited by Pachuca, but was then recommended to León. However, her debut was delayed as she was still undergoing injury rehab, upon her signing. She made her debut on September 6, 2021 against Club Tijuana.

In July 2022, she signed with Romanian club FC Carmen București.

In March 2023, she signed with Canadian club Electric City FC in League1 Ontario. She made eight appearances that season.

== International career ==
In August 2008, she was named to the Trinidad & Tobago U15 squad for the CFU Women's Youth Cup, having already appeared for the U17 already.

In 2010, she represented the Trinidad and Tobago U17 at the 2010 FIFA U-17 Women's World Cup. In October 2011, she captained the U17s for the first time in a match against St. Kitts and Nevis.

She has also played for the Trinidad and Tobago senior team. She debuted at the 2011 Pan American Games.
