= Khadidra Debesette =

Trinidad and Tobago footballer

Personal information
- Full name: Khadidra Debesette
- Date of birth: 6 January 1995 (age 31)
- Height: 1.63 m (5 ft 4 in)
- Position: Midfielder

College career
Years	Team	Apps	(Gls)
2015–2018	West Texas A&M Buffaloes	75	(16)

Senior career*
Years	Team	Apps	(Gls)
- Alutrint FC
- La Brea Angels

International career^{‡}
2010–2012	Trinidad and Tobago U17	13	(12)
2009–2012	Trinidad and Tobago U20	6	(2)
2011–2015	Trinidad and Tobago	8	(1)
- * Club domestic league appearances and goals ‡ National team caps and goals as of 18 July 2015

Khadidra Debesette (born 6 January 1995) is a Trinidad and Tobago footballer who plays as a midfielder. She has been a member of the Trinidad and Tobago women's national team.

== International career ==
Debesette represented Trinidad and Tobago at the 2010 FIFA U-17 Women's World Cup. At senior level, she played the 2015 Pan American Games.

=== International goals ===
Scores and results list Trinidad and Tobago' goal tally first.

No.	Date	Venue	Opponent	Score	Result	Competition
1	5 July 2011	Estadio Panamericano, San Cristóbal, Dominican Republic	Bermuda	2–0	5–1	2012 CONCACAF Women's Olympic Qualifying Tournament qualification

== Personal life ==
Debesette's twin sister Khadisha Debesette has also played for the Trinidad and Tobago women's national football team.
