= Summer Green =

American soccer player (born 1995)

Personal information
- Full name: Summer Lynn Green
- Date of birth: May 2, 1995 (age 31)
- Place of birth: Bloomington, Illinois
- Height: 5 ft 6 in (1.68 m)
- Position: Forward

Team information
- Current team: Damaiense

College career
| Years | Team | Apps | (Gls) |
| 2012–2015 | North Carolina Tar Heels | 65 | (18) |

Senior career*
| Years | Team | Apps | (Gls) |
| 2016 | Seattle Reign FC | 0 | (0) |
| 2017–2018 | Chicago Red Stars | 15 | (0) |
| 2019 | Vittsjö | 18 | (0) |
| 2020–2021 | Celtic | 0 | (0) |
| 2021–2022 | SC Sand | 20 | (2) |
| 2022– | Damaiense | 19 | (6) |

International career
| 2012 | United States U17 | 19 | (24) |
| 2014 | United States U20 | 4 | (0) |
| 2018 | United States U23 | | |
- * Club domestic league appearances and goals as of 19:29, May 15, 2023 (UTC)

Summer Lynn Green (born May 2, 1995) is an American soccer player who plays as a forward for Damaiense in the Campeonato Nacional Feminino. She previously played for the Chicago Red Stars in the National Women's Soccer League and for SC Sand in the Frauen-Bundesliga.

== Club career ==
=== Early career in the US ===
After playing four years at the University of North Carolina, Green was drafted by Seattle Reign FC with the 30th overall pick in the 2016 NWSL College Draft. She missed her entire rookie season due to a knee injury sustained in the NCAA Tournament.

Green was traded to the Chicago Red Stars for a 2017 international roster spot and a 2017 Draft pick.

In the 2017 season Green made seven appearances for the club, she started one game. In 2018 Green saw a small increase in playing time as she played 319 minutes in eight games.

=== In Europe ===
After two seasons with the Red Stars, Green signed with Vittsjö for the 2019 Damallsvenskan season.

In January 2020, Green joined Scottish side Celtic.

Green then signed with S.F. Damaiense in Portugal during the summer transfer window of 2022. On March 8, 2023, Green was named Liga BPI player of the month for January.

== International career ==
Green has represented the United States at various youth levels. She was a member of the U.S. U-17 team at the 2012 CONCACAF Women's U-17 Championship, where she started all five games. In a 10–0 win against the Bahamas, Green scored 5 goals which tied a U.S. record for most goals in a single game at any level. At the 2012 FIFA U-17 Women's World Cup Green played in all three games and scored two goals. The United States finished third in their group and did not advance to the knockout stage. When Green finished her U-17 career she was the all-time leading scorer with 19 goals, that record was broken by Ashley Sanchez who has 21 U-17 goals.

Green was a member of the United States U-20 team that won the 2014 CONCACAF Women's U-20 Championship, she played in four games and had one goal and three assists. She was named to the team for the 2014 FIFA U-20 Women's World Cup.

In August 2018, Green was named to the United States U-23 team for the U-23 Nordic Tournament in Norway.
