= Luz Duarte =

Mexican footballer (born 1995)

Personal information
- Full name: Luz Aída Duarte Moroyoqui
- Date of birth: 29 August 1995 (age 31)
- Place of birth: Nogales, Sonora, Mexico
- Height: 1.72 m (5 ft 7 1/2 in)
- Position: Forward

Senior career*
Years	Team	Apps	(Gls)
2015	Arizona Strikers		
2019–2021	FC Tucson		
2021–2023	UNAM	19	(7)
2023–2024	Atlético San Luis	9	(2)

International career
2012	Mexico U17	7	(5)
2014	Mexico U20	2	(0)
2014	Mexico	4	(2)
- * Club domestic league appearances and goals

Luz Aída Duarte Moroyoqui (born 29 August 1995) is a Mexican professional footballer who plays as a forward for FC Tucson Women.
