= 2025 League1 Canada season =

League1 Canada
- Season: 2025

Men's soccer
- League1 Alberta: Calgary Blizzard SC
- League1 BC: Langley United
- League1 Ontario: Woodbridge Strikers
- Ligue1 Québec: CS St-Laurent

Women's soccer
- League1 Alberta: Calgary Blizzard SC
- League1 BC: Altitude FC
- League1 Ontario: Simcoe County Rovers FC
- Ligue1 Québec: CS Mont-Royal Outremont
- Inter-Provincial Championship: Simcoe County Rovers FC

The 2025 League1 Canada season is the fourth edition of League1 Canada, the 3rd division soccer in Canada. It includes league competitions from its four member leagues, and an inter-provincial championship for select teams from the women's divisions. It was the last season before rebranding to Premier Soccer Leagues Canada.

== Men's competitions ==
=== Provincial leagues ===
League1 Alberta
League1 BC

| Pos | Team | Pld | Pts |
|---|---|---|---|
| 1 | Calgary Blizzard SC (C) | 16 | 35 |
| 2 | St. Albert Impact | 16 | 30 |
| 3 | Edmonton BTB SC | 16 | 29 |
| 4 | Calgary Foothills FC | 16 | 26 |
| 5 | Edmonton Scottish | 16 | 26 |
| 6 | Calgary Rangers SC | 16 | 25 |
| 7 | Cavalry FC U21 | 16 | 18 |
| 8 | Callies United | 16 | 13 |
| 9 | Calgary Villains FC | 16 | 0 |

Source: L1AB
(C) Champions

| Pos | Team | Pld | Pts |
|---|---|---|---|
| 1 | Langley United (C) | 16 | 33 |
| 2 | TSS FC Rovers | 16 | 32 |
| 3 | Altitude FC | 16 | 27 |
| 4 | Burnaby FC | 16 | 26 |
| 5 | Kamloops United FC | 16 | 23 |
| 6 | Evolution FC | 16 | 18 |
| 7 | Unity FC | 16 | 16 |
| 8 | Whitecaps FC Academy | 16 | 14 |
| 9 | Nanaimo United FC | 16 | 9 |

Source: L1BC Schedules and Standings
(C) Champions
League1 Ontario Premier
Ligue1 Québec

| Pos | Team | Pld | Pts |
|---|---|---|---|
| 1 | Woodbridge Strikers (C) | 20 | 43 |
| 2 | Scrosoppi FC | 20 | 41 |
| 3 | Alliance United FC | 20 | 35 |
| 4 | Simcoe County Rovers FC | 20 | 30 |
| 5 | Oakville SC | 20 | 29 |
| 6 | Vaughan Azzurri | 20 | 29 |
| 7 | St. Catharines Roma Wolves | 20 | 28 |
| 8 | Burlington SC | 20 | 24 |
| 9 | Sigma FC | 20 | 24 |
| 10 | North Toronto Nitros | 20 | 17 |
| 11 | FC London (R) | 20 | 8 |

Source: League1 Ontario
(C) Champions; (R) Relegated
See also: L1O Championship and League2 Ontario divisions

| Pos | Team | Pld | Pts |
|---|---|---|---|
| 1 | CS Saint-Laurent (C) | 18 | 43 |
| 2 | AS Laval | 18 | 34 |
| 3 | Royal-Sélect de Beauport | 18 | 29 |
| 4 | FC Laval | 18 | 28 |
| 5 | CS Mont-Royal Outremont | 18 | 24 |
| 6 | AS Blainville | 18 | 23 |
| 7 | Celtix du Haut-Richelieu | 18 | 21 |
| 8 | CS St-Hubert | 18 | 19 |
| 9 | Ottawa South United | 18 | 17 |
| 10 | CS Longueuil | 18 | 15 |

Source: Spordle
(C) Champions
See also: Ligue2 Québec, Ligue3 Québec and Ligue Espoirs Québec

== Women's competitions ==
=== Provincial leagues ===
League1 Alberta
League1 BC
League1 Ontario

| Pos | Team | Pld | Pts |
|---|---|---|---|
| 1 | Calgary Blizzard SC (C) | 14 | 35 |
| 2 | Calgary Foothills WFC | 14 | 33 |
| 3 | St. Albert Impact | 14 | 31 |
| 4 | Edmonton BTB SC | 14 | 18 |
| 5 | Callies United | 14 | 14 |
| 6 | Calgary Villains FC | 14 | 13 |
| 7 | Calgary Rangers SC | 14 | 13 |
| 8 | Edmonton Scottish | 14 | 5 |
| 9 | Calgary Wild U21 | 0 | 0 |

Updated to match(es) played on August 1, 2025. Source: L1AB
(C) Champions

| Pos | Team | Pld | Pts |
|---|---|---|---|
| 1 | Altitude FC (C) | 16 | 43 |
| 2 | Vancouver Rise FC Academy | 16 | 37 |
| 3 | Unity FC | 16 | 31 |
| 4 | TSS Rovers FC | 16 | 25 |
| 5 | Langley United | 16 | 18 |
| 6 | Evolution FC | 16 | 17 |
| 7 | Nanaimo United FC | 16 | 15 |
| 8 | Burnaby FC | 16 | 12 |
| 9 | Kamloops United FC | 16 | 6 |

Source: L1BC Schedules and Standings
(C) Champions

| Pos | Team | Pld | Pts |
|---|---|---|---|
| 1 | Simcoe County Rovers FC (C) | 18 | 45 |
| 2 | North Toronto Nitros | 18 | 42 |
| 3 | NDC Ontario | 18 | 41 |
| 4 | Guelph United F.C. | 18 | 29 |
| 5 | Vaughan Azzurri | 18 | 26 |
| 6 | Waterloo United | 18 | 17 |
| 7 | Woodbridge Strikers | 18 | 16 |
| 8 | North Mississauga SC | 18 | 13 |
| 9 | FC London (O) | 18 | 13 |
| 10 | Alliance United FC (R) | 18 | 10 |

Source: League1 Ontario
(C) Champions; (O) Play-off winners; (R) Relegated
See also: L1O Championship and League2 Ontario divisions
Ligue1 Québec (group A)
Ligue1 Québec (group B)

| Pos | Team | Pld | Pts |
|---|---|---|---|
| 1 | FC Laval | 13 | 25 |
| 2 | CS Mont-Royal Outremont (C) | 13 | 24 |
| 3 | CS Longueuil | 13 | 22 |
| 4 | AS Blainville | 13 | 15 |
| 5 | AS Laval | 13 | 3 |

Source: Spordle
(C) Champions
See also: L1Q reserve division

| Pos | Team | Pld | Pts |
|---|---|---|---|
| 1 | CF Montréal Academy | 13 | 29 |
| 2 | Royal-Sélect de Beauport | 13 | 25 |
| 3 | Celtix du Haut-Richelieu | 13 | 25 |
| 4 | Ottawa South United | 13 | 17 |
| 5 | Rapides de Chaudière-Ouest | 13 | 3 |
| 6 | CS St-Hubert (R) | 0 | 0 |

Source: Spordle
(R) Relegated

=== Provincial playoffs ===
Quebec uses a post-season playoff competition to determine a regional league champion.

==== Ligue1 Québec ====
Semifinals; July 29-30
A1 | FC Laval | 2
B2 | Royal-Sélect de Beauport | 1
B1 | CF Montréal Academy | 0
A2 | CS Mont-Royal Outremont | 1

Championship Game; August 3
A1 | FC Laval | 1
A2 | CS Mont-Royal Outremont | 3

Source: Spordle

Semifinals; August 23
1 | CF Montréal Academy | 5
4 | AS Blainville U21 | 0
2 | Ottawa South United U21 | 4
3 | Royal-Sélect de Beauport U21 | 0

Championship Game; August 30
1 | CF Montréal Academy | 1(2)
2 | Ottawa South United U21 | 1(3)

Source: Spordle

=== Inter-Provincial Championship ===
2025 Inter-Provincial Championship
Tournament details
- Venue(s): Emerald Hill Sports Park, Sherwood Park, AB
- Dates: August 8–10
- Teams: 4

Final positions
- Champions: (Ontario) Simcoe County Rovers FC (1st title)
- Runners-up: (Quebec) CS Mont-Royal Outremont

Tournament statistics
- Matches played: 4
- Goals scored: 10 (2.5 per match)

The 2025 Women's Inter-Provincial Championship was held from August 8 to 10 in Sherwood Park, Alberta. The draw for the tournament was conducted on July 26. The winner and runner-up qualified for the 2026–27 W Canadian Championship.

==== Details ====
Qualified teams
| Team | Method |
|---|---|
| (Alberta) Calgary Blizzard SC | L1AB champions |
| (British Columbia) Altitude FC | L1BC champions |
| (Ontario) Simcoe County Rovers FC | L1ON champions |
| (Quebec) CS Mont-Royal Outremont | L1QC champions |

Host
Alberta
| City | Stadium(s) | Capacity |
|---|---|---|
| Sherwood Park, Alberta | Emerald Hill Sports Park | 1,500 |

==== Bracket ====
Semifinals; August 8
BC | Altitude FC | 0
ON | Simcoe County Rovers FC | 1
AB | Calgary Blizzard SC | 1
QC | CS Mont-Royal Outremont | 2

Championship Game; August 10
ON | Simcoe County Rovers FC | 2
QC | CS Mont-Royal Outremont | 0
Third place
BC | Altitude FC | 2 (3)
AB | Calgary Blizzard SC | 2 (5)
