= Lacey Kindel =

Canadian soccer player (born 2009)

Personal information
- Full name: Lacey Maglio Kindel
- Date of birth: September 27, 2009 (age 17)
- Place of birth: Coquitlam, British Columbia, Canada
- Height: 5 ft 5 in (1.65 m)
- Position: Midfielder

Youth career
- Coquitlam Metro-Ford SC
- 2024–2026: Vancouver Rise FC (Note: Whitecaps FC Girls Elite re-branded as the Vancouver Rise FC Academy in 2025)

College career
Years	Team	Apps	(Gls)
2026–	Michigan State Spartans	11	(1)

Senior career*
Years	Team	Apps	(Gls)
2024–2026	Vancouver Rise FC Academy	24	(11)
2026	→ Vancouver Rise FC (loan)	2	(0)

International career^{‡}
2024	Canada U15	5	(0)
2025–2026	Canada U17	13	(7)
- * Club domestic league appearances and goals as of September 8, 2026 ‡ National team caps and goals as of September 8, 2026

Lacey Maglio Kindel (born September 27, 2009) is a Canadian soccer player. She is the youngest player to ever appear in a Northern Super League match.

== Early life ==
Kindel played youth soccer with Coquitlam Metro-Ford SC and the Whitecaps FC Girls Elite.

== College career ==
Kindel graduated high school a year early. In 2026, Kindel began attending Michigan State University, where she played for the women's soccer team. She made her collegiate debut on August 12, 2026 against the Xavier Musketeers. On September 27, 2026, she scored her first collegiate goal in a 3-0 victory over the Washington Huskies.

== Club career ==
In 2024, Kindel began playing with the Whitecaps FC Girls Elite (later re-branded as Vancouver Rise FC Academy) in League1 British Columbia (later re-branded as the British Columbia Premier League). In April 2026, she joined Vancouver Rise FC in the Northern Super League on a Youth Development Permit, allowing her to play for the NSL club, in addition to her BCPL team. On April 24, 2026, she made her professional debut against AFC Toronto, becoming the youngest player to appear in a Northern Super League match. On June 25, 2026, she scored both goals in a 2-0 victory over the TSS FC Rovers to clinch the 2026 BCPL title for the Rise Academy, also being named one of the league's three stars of the week for June. At the end of the 2026 season, she was named the BCPL MVP, U20 Player of the Year, and named to the Team of the Season.

== International career ==
Kindel represented the Canada U15 at the 2024 CONCACAF Girls' U-15 Championship, finishing third. She later played with the Canada U17 at the 2025 CONCACAF U-17 Women's World Cup qualification and 2025 FIFA U-17 Women's World Cup. She was again named to the squad in 2026 for the 2026 CONCACAF U-17 Women's World Cup qualification, scoring two goals in a 5-0 victory over Nicaragua on March 18, 2026. In August 2026, she was called up to a camp in preparation for the 2026 FIFA U-17 Women's World Cup.

== Personal life ==
Kindel is the daughter of Steve Kindel and Sara Maglio, who were both professional soccer players and represented the Canada national team. Her brother, Ben Kindel, plays professional ice hockey for the National Hockey League's Pittsburgh Penguins. She is of Italian descent.

== Career statistics ==
As of September 8, 2026

Club	Season	League			Playoffs		Domestic Cup		Continental		Other		Total	
Club	Season	Division	Apps	Goals	Apps	Goals	Apps	Goals	Apps	Goals	Apps	Goals	Apps	Goals
Vancouver Rise FC Academy	2024	League1 British Columbia	2	0	1	0	—		1	0	0	0	4	0
Vancouver Rise FC Academy	2025	League1 British Columbia	13	5	—		—		3	0	—		16	5
Vancouver Rise FC Academy	2026	British Columbia Premier League	9	6	—		—		—		—		9	6
Vancouver Rise FC Academy	Total		24	11	1	0	0	0	4	0	0	0	29	11
Vancouver Rise FC (loan)	2026	Northern Super League	2	0	0	0	—		—		—		2	0
Career total			26	11	1	0	0	0	4	0	0	0	31	11
