= 2023 League1 Canada season =

League1 Canada
- Season: 2023

Men's soccer
- League1 BC: Whitecaps FC Academy
- League1 Ontario: Simcoe County Rovers FC
- Ligue1 Québec: CS Saint-Laurent

Women's soccer
- League1 BC: Whitecaps FC Girls Elite
- League1 Ontario: Alliance United FC
- Ligue1 Québec: PEF Québec
- Inter-provincial Championship: Whitecaps FC Girls Elite

The 2023 League1 Canada season is the second edition of League1 Canada, the 3rd division soccer in Canada. It includes league competitions from its three member leagues, and an inter-provincial championship for select teams from the women's divisions.

== Men's competitions ==
=== Provincial leagues ===
League1 BC

Pos	Team	Pld	Pts
1	Victoria Highlanders FC	14	32
2	TSS Rovers	14	29
3	Whitecaps FC Academy (C)	14	22
4	Unity FC	14	20
5	Nautsa’mawt FC	14	17
6	Rivers FC	14	16
7	Altitude FC	14	9
8	Harbourside FC	14	7

Source: League1 BC
(C) Champions
League1 Ontario

Pos	Team	Pld	Pts
1	Scrosoppi FC	20	51
2	Simcoe County Rovers FC (C)	20	46
3	Vaughan Azzurri	20	45
4	Blue Devils FC	20	39
5	Burlington SC	20	39
6	Guelph United F.C.	20	39
7	Electric City FC	20	37
8	Alliance United FC	20	33
9	Sigma FC	20	32
10	North Toronto Nitros	20	31
11	Hamilton United	20	26
12	Woodbridge Strikers	20	26
13	FC London	20	25
14	Darby FC	20	23
15	Windsor City FC	20	20
16	St. Catharines Roma Wolves	20	20
17	North Mississauga SC	20	20
18	ProStars FC	20	19
19	Master's FA	20	14
20	Unionville Milliken SC	20	4
21	BVB IA Waterloo	20	3

Source: League1 Ontario
(C) Champions
See also: Reserve and U19 Reserve Divisions
Ligue1 Québec

Pos	Team	Pld	Pts
1	CS Saint-Laurent (C)	22	55
2	Royal-Sélect de Beauport	22	45
3	CS Mont-Royal Outremont	22	41
4	FC Laval	22	40
5	CF Montréal U23	22	40
6	CS St-Hubert	22	30
7	AS Blainville	22	30
8	CS Longueuil	22	26
9	AS Laval	22	24
10	Celtix du Haut-Richelieu	22	20
11	Ottawa South United	22	18
12	CS Lanaudière-Nord	22	2

Source: Spordle
(C) Champions
See also: Reserve Division

=== Provincial playoffs ===
British Columbia and Ontario use a post-season playoff competition to determine a regional league champion. Quebec however does not have a playoff competition and uses the regular season standings to determine their league champion.

==== League1 BC ====
Semi-finals; July 29
1	Victoria Highlanders FC	3
4	Unity FC	2
2	TSS Rovers	0
3	Whitecaps FC Academy	4

Final; August 5
1	Victoria Highlanders FC	1 (7)
3	Whitecaps FC Academy	1 (8)

==== League1 Ontario ====
Quarter-finals; August 23
4	Blue Devils FC	4
5	Burlington SC	1
3	Vaughan Azzurri	2
6	Guelph United FC	0

Semi-finals; August 26–27
1	Scrosoppi FC	2
4	Blue Devils FC	1
2	Simcoe County Rovers FC	3
3	Vaughan Azzurri	0

Final; September 2
1	Scrosoppi FC	2
2	Simcoe County Rovers FC	4

=== Provincial league cups ===
Coupe L1QC

First Round; October 7–8
CS Longueuil	0
CS St-Laurent	6
CS St-Hubert	0
AS Laval	2
CS Lanaudière-Nord	4
Ottawa South United	2
CS Mont-Royal Outremont	3
CF Montréal U23	0

Quarter-Finals; October 14
AS Blainville	1
CS St-Laurent	4
Royal-Sélect de Beauport	5
AS Laval	0
FC Laval	2 (4)
CS Lanaudière-Nord	2 (5)
Celtix du Haut-Richelieu	0
CS Mont-Royal Outremont	2

Semi-Finals; October 21
CS St-Laurent	4
Royal-Sélect de Beauport	1
CS Lanaudière-Nord	0
CS Mont-Royal Outremont	3

Final; October 28
CS St-Laurent	2
CS Mont-Royal Outremont	0

Source: Spordle

=== 2024 Canadian Championship qualification ===
In the men's divisions, Victoria Highlanders FC (L1BC), Simcoe County Rovers FC (L1O), and CS Saint-Laurent (L1Q) qualified for the 2024 Canadian Championship as the sole representatives from their respective leagues. However, the Highlanders withdrew prior to the start of the competition; the club was replaced by TSS FC Rovers.

== Women's competitions ==
=== Provincial leagues ===
League1 BC

Pos	Team	Pld	Pts
1	Whitecaps FC Girls Elite (C)	14	34
2	Nautsa’mawt FC	14	29
3	Unity FC	14	24
4	TSS Rovers	14	21
5	Harbourside FC	14	17
6	Altitude FC	14	17
7	Victoria Highlanders FC	14	13
8	Rivers FC	14	3

Source: League1 BC
(C) Champions
League1 Ontario

Pos	Team	Pld	Pts
1	NDC Ontario	18	45
2	Vaughan Azzurri	18	44
3	North Toronto Nitros	18	38
4	Alliance United FC (C)	18	35
5	Woodbridge Strikers	18	34
6	FC London	18	32
7	Simcoe County Rovers FC	18	28
8	Electric City FC	18	27
9	North Mississauga SC	18	27
10	BVB IA Waterloo	18	24
11	Blue Devils FC	18	24
12	Guelph Union	18	24
13	Unionville Milliken SC	18	21
14	St. Catharines Roma Wolves	18	21
15	Hamilton United	18	18
16	Darby FC	18	16
17	Tecumseh SC	18	14
18	Burlington SC	18	11
19	ProStars FC	18	1

Source: League1 Ontario
(C) Champions
See also: Reserve and U19 Reserve Divisions
Ligue1 Québec

Pos	Team	Pld	Pts
1	PEF Québec (C)	11	26
2	Rapides de Chaudière-Ouest	11	23
3	A.S. Blainville	11	21
4	Pierrefonds FC	11	21
5	Ottawa South United	11	16
6	Royal-Sélect de Beauport	11	15
7	AS Laval	11	13
8	FC Laval	11	12
9	CS Mont-Royal Outremont	11	12
10	Celtix du Haut-Richelieu	11	9
11	CS Longueuil	11	7
12	CS St-Hubert	11	4

Source: Spordle
(C) Champions

=== Provincial playoffs ===
British Columbia and Ontario use a post-season playoff competition to determine a regional league champion. Quebec however does not have a playoff competition and uses the regular season standings to determine their league champion.

==== League1 BC ====
Semi-finals; July 29–30
1	Whitecaps FC Girls Elite	5
4	TSS Rovers	2
2	Nautsa’mawt FC	1
3	Unity FC	4

Final; August 5
1	Whitecaps FC Girls Elite	3
3	Unity FC	1

==== League1 Ontario ====
Quarter-finals; July 26–27
3	North Toronto Nitros	0(3)
6	FC London	0(4)
4	Alliance United FC	1(5)
5	Woodbridge Strikers	1(3)

Semi-finals; July 30
1	NDC Ontario	4
6	FC London	0
2	Vaughan Azzurri	1
4	Alliance United FC	2

Final; August 5
1	NDC Ontario	1
4	Alliance United FC (a.e.t.)	2

=== Provincial league cups ===
Coupe PLSQ

First Round; July 4–6
AS Laval	2
Celtix du Haut-Richelieu	1
CS Mont-Royal Outremont	3
CS Longueuil	0
Ottawa South United	1
Pierrefonds FC	3
PEF Québec	2
CS St-Hubert	0

Quarter-Finals; July 20–22
AS Blainville	1(4)
AS Laval	1(2)
FC Laval	2
CS Mont-Royal Outremont	0
Rapides de Chaudière-Ouest	6
Pierrefonds FC	2
Royal-Sélect de Beauport	2
PEF Québec	4

Semi-Finals; July 29–30
AS Blainville	0
FC Laval	3
Rapides de Chaudière-Ouest	0
PEF Québec	1

Final; August 6
FC Laval	0
PEF Québec	2

Source: Spordle

=== Inter-Provincial Championship ===
2023 Inter-Provincial Championship
Tournament details
- Venue(s): Willoughby Community Park, Langley, BC
- Dates: August 11–13
- Teams: 4

Final positions
- Champions: (British Columbia) Whitecaps FC Girls Elite (1st title)
- Runners-up: (Quebec) PEF Québec
- Third place: (British Columbia) Unity FC
- Fourth place: (Ontario) Alliance United FC

Tournament statistics
- Matches played: 4
- Goals scored: 20 (5 per match)
- Top goal scorer(s): (Canada) Kierra Blundell (Canada) Esther Brossard (3 goals each)

==== Details ====
The Women's Inter-Provincial Championship was hosted by British Columbia, with the semi-finals occurring on August 11 and the final and third-place match occurring on August 13. As hosts, an extra qualification spot was allocated to League1 British Columbia and all matches took place at Willoughby Community Park Stadium in Langley. The winner of the tournament qualified for the 2024–25 CONCACAF W Champions Cup.

Qualified teams
Team	Method
(British Columbia) Whitecaps FC Girls Elite	L1BC regular season winners
(Ontario) Alliance United FC	L1O champion
(Quebec) PEF Québec	L1QC champions
(British Columbia) Unity FC	L1BC playoff runner-up (Note: Host berth allocated for the runner-up as the L1BC playoff champion had already acquired the regular season winning berth.)

Host
(British Columbia) BC Soccer
City	Stadium(s)	Capacity
Langley	Willoughby Community Park	6,600

==== Bracket ====
Semifinals
QC	PEF Québec	6
BC-2	Unity FC	4
ON	Alliance United FC	1
BC-1	Whitecaps FC Girls Elite	2

Championship Game
QC	PEF Québec	0
BC-1	Whitecaps FC Girls Elite	5
Third place
ON	Alliance United FC	0
BC-2	Unity FC	2

==== Matches ====
Semi-finals

August 11	PEF Québec (Quebec)	6–4	(British Columbia) Unity FC	Langley, British Columbia
2:30 PM PST	Brossard 4', 84' (pen.), 90+5'; Larouche 41', 60'; McNeely 72' (o.g.)	Comet report	Spiller 8'; Bergen 45+1'; Avery 45+2'; Andrews 76'	Stadium: Willoughby Community Park Stadium; Referee: Amanda Kwan

August 11	Alliance United FC (Ontario)	1–2	(British Columbia) Whitecaps FC Girls Elite	Langley, British Columbia
7:00 PM PST	Chown 73'	Comet report	Blundell 45' (pen.), 69'	Stadium: Willoughby Community Park Stadium; Referee: Sheila Couture

Third place match

August 13	Alliance United FC (Ontario)	0–2	(British Columbia) Unity FC	Langley, British Columbia
10:30 AM PST			Connell; Ewasiuk 72'	Stadium: Willoughby Community Park Stadium; Referee: Shaelyn Holdaway

Final

August 13	PEF Québec (Quebec)	0–5	(British Columbia) Whitecaps FC Girls Elite	Langley, British Columbia
4:00 PM PST			Blundell 16'; Kimwemwe 22', 86'; Perrault 28'; Hernandez Gray 53'	Stadium: Willoughby Community Park Stadium; Referee: Sydney Berridge

== Combined competitions ==
=== Juan de Fuca Plate (L1BC) ===
2023 Juan de Fuca Plate standings
Pos	Team	Pld	W	D	L	GF	GA	GD	Pts
1	Whitecaps FC Academy (C)	28	16	8	4	73	31	+42	56
2	TSS FC Rovers	28	15	5	8	55	35	+20	50
3	Nautsa’mawt FC	28	13	7	8	57	35	+22	46
4	Victoria Highlanders FC	28	13	6	9	34	35	−1	45
5	Unity FC	28	12	8	8	61	40	+21	44
6	Altitude FC	28	6	8	14	36	51	−15	26
7	Harbourside FC	28	6	6	16	32	70	−38	24
8	Rivers FC	28	5	4	19	35	86	−51	19

Source: Juan de Fuca Plate
(C) Champions

== Exhibition Series ==
League1 Alberta held an Exhibition series for the 2023 season, ahead of their anticipated launch in 2024. An exhibition series was also held in the Maritimes, as a trial for a potential League1 Atlantic.

=== Men ===
League1 Alberta

Pos	Team	Pld	Pts
1	Calgary Foothills FC (C)	8	20
2	St. Albert Impact	8	11
3	Edmonton BTB SC	8	10
4	Cavalry FC U21	8	8
5	Edmonton Scottish	8	6

Source: L1AB
(C) Champions
Maritime Super Series

Pos	Team	Pld	Pts
1	Suburban FC (C)	6	18
2	Fredericton Picaroons Reds	6	6
3	Winsloe Charlottetown Royals FC	6	3

Source: Standings
(C) Champions

Championship Final

League1 Alberta

Final; July 28
1	Calgary Foothills FC	3
2	St. Albert Impact	0

Maritime Super Series

Final; August 5
1	Suburban FC	7
2	Fredericton Picaroons Reds	0

=== Women ===
League1 Alberta

Pos	Team	Pld	Pts
1	St. Albert Impact	8	22
2	Calgary Blizzard SC (C)	8	16
3	Calgary Foothills WFC	8	15
4	Edmonton BTB SC	8	3
5	Edmonton Scottish	8	3

Source: L1AB
(C) Champions
Maritime Super Series

Pos	Team	Pld	Pts
1	Suburban FC (C)	6	14
2	Winsloe Charlottetown Royals FC	6	6
3	Fredericton Picaroons Reds	6	4

Source: Standings
(C) Champions

Championship Final

League1 Alberta

Final; July 28
1	St. Albert Impact	1(4)
2	Calgary Blizzard SC	1(5)

Maritime Super Series

Final; August 5
1	Suburban FC	4
2	Winsloe Charlottetown Royals FC	3
