= 2026 British Columbia Premier League season =

British Columbia Premier League
- Season: 2026
- Dates: April 2 – July 5
- Champions: Langley United (men); Vancouver Rise FC Academy (women)
- Juan de Fuca Plate: Whitecaps and Rise Academies

The 2026 British Columbia Premier League season was the fifth season of play for the British Columbia Premier League (and first since re-branding from League1 British Columbia), a pro-am league in the Canadian soccer league system. Eight clubs participated in both the men's and women's divisions.

== Changes from 2025 ==
The league re-branded from League1 British Columbia to the British Columbia Premier League following the 2025 season. Evolution FC departed the league after the 2025 season.

== Men's division ==
The teams played each other team twice (home and away) for a 14-game season.

=== League table ===
Pos	Team	Pld	W	D	L	GF	GA	GD	Pts	Qualification
1	Langley United (C)	14	11	2	1	40	13	+27	35	2027 Canadian Championship
2	TSS Rovers FC	14	10	2	2	30	16	+14	32	
3	Whitecaps FC Academy	14	7	1	6	35	28	+7	22	
4	Nanaimo United FC	14	5	3	6	23	24	−1	18	
5	Altitude FC	14	5	3	6	23	26	−3	18	
6	Burnaby FC	14	4	4	6	26	22	+4	16	
7	Kamloops United FC	14	2	3	9	12	36	−24	9	
8	Unity FC	14	2	2	10	21	45	−24	8	

Source: BCPL
(C) Champions

=== Statistics ===
Top goalscorers

Rank	Player	Club	Goals
1	Chris Album	Whitecaps FC Academy	13
2	Massud Habibullah	TSS FC Rovers	11
3	Brody Thomas	Langley United	9
4	Felipe Morales Moya	Nanaimo United	8
5	Ivan Mejia	Langley United	7
6	Ayman Sahmuddeen	Altitude FC	6
6	Charlie Smith	Nanaimo United	6
6	Maximilian Comia	Burnaby FC	6
9	Brandon Momotani	Burnaby FC	6
9	Daniel Motalebian	TSS FC Rovers	6
9	Elliott Riches	Altitude FC	6

Source: BCPL

=== League honours ===
==== Awards ====
Award	Player	Team	Ref
Most Valuable Player	Brody Thomas	Langley United	
Honourable Mention	Chris Album	Whitecaps FC Academy	
U20 Player of the Year	Lucas Friend	Langley United	
Coach of the Year	Azad Palani	Langley United	
Golden Boot (Top Scorer)	Chris Album	Whitecaps FC Academy	

==== Team of the Year ====
The following players were named to the British Columbia Premier League Team of the Year for the 2026 season:

Player	Position
Callum Weir (TSS FC Rovers)	Goalkeeper
Nick MacKinnkon (TSS FC Rovers)	Defender
Adam Hajdecki (Langley United)	Defender
Lachlan MacGowan (Whitecaps FC Academy)	Defender
Ivan Mejia (Langley United)	Midfielder
Felipe Morales Moya (Nanaimo United)	Midfielder
Elijah Dos Santos (Kamloops United)	Midfielder
Aiden Nielsen (Unity FC)	Midfielder
Ayman Sahmuddeen (Altitude FC)	Forward
Brody Thomas (Langley United)	Forward
Maximilian Comsia (Burnaby FC)	Forward

== Women's division ==
The teams played each other team twice (home and away) for a 14-game season.

=== League table ===
Pos	Team	Pld	W	D	L	GF	GA	GD	Pts
1	Vancouver Rise FC Academy (C)	14	13	0	1	40	7	+33	39
2	Altitude FC	14	10	2	2	46	13	+33	32
3	Langley United	14	7	3	4	22	17	+5	24
4	TSS Rovers FC	14	6	3	5	17	18	−1	21
5	Unity FC	14	6	1	7	23	23	0	19
6	Kamloops United FC	14	3	2	9	9	32	−23	11
7	Burnaby FC	14	3	1	10	18	46	−28	10
8	Nanaimo United FC	14	0	4	10	10	29	−19	4

Source: BCPL
(C) Champions

=== Statistics ===
Top goalscorers

Rank	Player	Club	Goals
1	Brooklyn Boldt	Vancouver Rise FC Academy	14
2	Ella Santarsieri	Altitude FC	10
3	Alyssa Clark	Langley United	6
3	Chloe Van Schalkwyk	Altitude FC	6
3	Lacey Kindel	Vancouver Rise FC Academy	6
3	Montanna Leonard	Unity FC	6
7	Charity Field	Unity FC	5
7	Kierra Blundell	Altitude FC	5
9	Chloe Taylor	Vancouver Rise FC Academy	4
9	Harjanat Boora	Vancouver Rise FC Academy	4
9	Madeline Mori	Burnaby FC	4
9	Victoria Cronkhite	Altitude FC	4

Source: BCPL

=== League honours ===
==== Awards ====
Award	Player	Team	Ref
Most Valuable Player	Lacey Kindel	Vancouver Rise FC Academy	
Honourable Mention	Pak Tung Tsang	Langley United	
U20 Player of the Year	Lacey Kindel	Vancouver Rise FC Academy	
Coach of the Year	Sam Gevaux; Esteban Mora	Vancouver Rise FC Academy	
Golden Boot (Top Scorer)	Brooklyn Boldt	Vancouver Rise FC Academy	

==== Team of the Year ====
The following players were named to the British Columbia Premier League Team of the Year for the 2026 season:

Player	Position
Sarah Loewen (Unity FC)	Goalkeeper
Zoelle Apps (Altitude FC)	Defender
Myla Ewasiuk (Vancouver Rise Academy)	Defender
Sofia Faremo (TSS FC Rovers)	Defender
Alyssa Clark (Langley United)	Midfielder
Anika Black (Kamloops United)	Midfielder
Camryn Curts (Nanaimo United)	Midfielder
Ella Santarsieri (Altitude FC)	Midfielder
Julie Dirom (Burnaby FC)	Midfielder
Lacey Kindel (Vancouver Rise Academy)	Forward
Brooklyn Boldt (Vancouver Rise Academy)	Forward

== Juan de Fuca Plate ==
The Juan de Fuca Plate was awarded to the League1 British Columbia club with the highest combined point total between the men's and women's divisions in regular season matches.

Pos	Team	Pld	W	D	L	GF	GA	GD	Pts
1	Whitecaps and Rise Academies (C)	28	20	1	7	75	35	+40	61
2	Langley United	28	18	5	5	62	30	+32	59
3	TSS Rovers FC	28	16	5	7	47	34	+13	53
4	Altitude FC	28	15	5	8	69	39	+30	50
5	Unity FC	28	8	3	17	44	68	−24	27
6	Burnaby FC	28	7	5	16	44	68	−24	26
7	Nanaimo United FC	28	5	7	16	33	53	−20	22
8	Kamloops United FC	28	5	5	18	21	68	−47	20

Source: BCPL schedules and standings
(C) Champions
