= Yvamara Rodríguez =

Panamanian footballer (born 1992)

Personal information
- Full name: Yvamara Xagely Rodríguez Mendoza
- Date of birth: 21 June 1992 (age 34)
- Place of birth: Montreal, Quebec, Canada
- Height: 5 ft 3 in (1.60 m)
- Position: Midfielder

Team information
- Current team: Unity FC

Youth career
- Coquitlam Metro-Ford SC

College career
| Years | Team | Apps | (Gls) |
| 2010 | Kwantlen Eagles | | |
| 2013 | Simon Fraser Clan | 15 | (0) |

Senior career*
| Years | Team | Apps | (Gls) |
| 2022 | Rivers FC | | |
| 2023–2024 | Altitude FC | 22 | (1) |
| 2025 | Burnaby FC | 12 | (0) |
| 2026– | Unity FC | 10 | (0) |

International career^{‡}
| 2011–2012 | Panama U20 | 6 | (0) |
| 2022 | Panama | 1 | (0) |
- * Club domestic league appearances and goals as of October 7, 2026 ‡ National team caps and goals as of 19 May 2022

Yvamara Xagely Rodríguez Mendoza (born 21 June 1992) is a footballer who plays as a midfielder for Unity FC in the British Columbia Premier League. Born in Canada, she played for the Panama women's national team.

== Early life ==
Rodríguez was born in Montreal, Quebec to Panamanian parents. She played youth soccer with Coquitlam Metro-Ford SC.

== University career ==
In 2010, she began attending Kwantlen Polytechnic University, playing for the women's soccer team. In 2011, she was named a league Second Team All-Star.

In 2013, she played for the Simon Fraser Clan of Simon Fraser University.

== Club career ==
She played senior amateur soccer with Surrey United SC. In 2017, she scored the only goal in a 1-0 victory to win the Provincial Cup. She was part of the squad that won the Provincial Cup again in 2018.

In 2022, she signed with Rivers FC in League1 British Columbia and was awarded top defensive player of the year by the club.

In February 2023, she joined Altitude FC in League1 British Columbia.

In 2025, she played with Burnaby FC in League1 British Columbia. In 2026, she moved to Unity FC in the British Columbia Premier League (re-branded from League1 British Columbia).

== International career ==
In August 2011, she earned her first callup to the Panama U20 for the 2012 CONCACAF Women's U-20 Championship qualification tournament. In February 2012, she was called up for the 2012 CONCACAF Women's U-20 Championship.

In February 2022, she was called up to the Panama senior team for the first time, for the 2022 CONCACAF W Championship qualification tournament. She made her debut on February 20 against Belize.
