= Tilly James =

Canadian soccer player (born 2001)

Personal information
- Date of birth: September 5, 2001 (age 25)
- Place of birth: New Zealand
- Height: 5 ft 8 in (1.73 m)
- Position: Defender

Team information
- Current team: Calgary Wild FC
- Number: 11

Youth career
- 2019–2020: TSS FC Rovers

College career
Years	Team	Apps	(Gls)
2021–2024	Trinity Western Spartans	82	(12)

Senior career*
Years	Team	Apps	(Gls)
2022–2023	Unity FC	7	(0)
2024	TSS FC Rovers	7	(1)
2025–	Calgary Wild FC	21	(0)
- * Club domestic league appearances and goals as of October 28, 2026

Tilly James (born September 5, 2001) is a Canadian-New Zealand soccer player who plays for Calgary Wild FC in the Northern Super League.

== Early life ==
She was born in New Zealand before moving to Canada. James played youth soccer in her hometown of Vancouver, as well as in the United States and New Zealand while moving with her family as a child.

== University career ==
In 2020, James began attending Trinity Western University, where she played for the women's soccer team (beginning in 2021 as the 2020 season was cancelled due to the COVID-19 pandemic). In her first season, she was named to the Canada West All-Rookie Team, a Canada West Second Team All-Star, and the U Sports All-Rookie Team. On September 24, 2022, Tilly scored both goals in a 2-0 victory over the UBC Okanagan Heat, which earned her Canada West Player of the Week honours. At the end of the 2022 season, she was named a Canada West First Team All-Star and a U Sports First Team All-Canadian. In 2023, she helped the squad win the Canada West title and a silver medal at the U Sports National Championships, where she was named to the All-Tournament Team. At the end of 2023, she was again named a Canada West First Team All-Star. She was also named the 2023-24 TWU Spartans Female Athlete of the Year. On October 11, 2024, she scored a brace in a 4-0 victory over the UFV Cascades. At the end of 2024, she was named a Canada West First Team All-Star and a U Sports Second Team All-Canadian. While with the team, she served as team captain.

== Club career ==
In 2022, James joined Unity FC in League1 British Columbia. In 2024, she played with the TSS FC Rovers.

In February 2025, she signed with Northern Super League club Calgary Wild FC for the 2025 season.

== Career statistics ==
As of October 28, 2026

Club	Season	League			Playoffs		Domestic Cup		Other		Total	
Club	Season	Division	Apps	Goals	Apps	Goals	Apps	Goals	Apps	Goals	Apps	Goals
Unity FC	2023	League1 British Columbia	7	0	2	2	—		0	0	9	2
TSS FC Rovers	2024	League1 British Columbia	7	1	1	0	—		—		8	1
Calgary Wild	2025	Northern Super League	3	0	—		—		—		3	0
Calgary Wild	2026	Northern Super League	18	0	0	0	1	0	—		19	0
Calgary Wild	Total		21	0	0	0	1	0	0	0	22	0
Career total			35	1	3	2	1	0	0	0	42	3
