= Jazmine Wilkinson =

Canadian soccer player (born 2002)

Personal information
- Full name: Jazmine Tamara Wilkinson
- Date of birth: March 8, 2002 (age 24)
- Place of birth: Chicago, Illinois, United States
- Height: 1.75 m (5 ft 9 in)
- Position: Forward

Team information
- Current team: Ottawa Rapid FC
- Number: 9

Youth career
- Harbour City FC
- Vancouver Island Wave
- Vancouver Whitecaps FC

College career
Years	Team	Apps	(Gls)
2020–2022	Arizona State Sun Devils	53	(5)
2023–2024	Texas A&M Aggies	40	(13)

Senior career*
Years	Team	Apps	(Gls)
2023–2024	Harbourside FC	14	(2)
2025–	Ottawa Rapid FC	27	(3)

International career^{‡}
2018	Canada U17	1	(0)
2020	Canada U20	5	(2)
- * Club domestic league appearances and goals as of October 30, 2026 ‡ National team caps and goals as of March 4, 2020

Jazmine Tamara Wilkinson (born March 8, 2002) is a Canadian soccer player who plays for Ottawa Rapid FC in the Northern Super League.

== Early life ==
Born in the United States, Wilkinson was adopted by a Canadian family before she was a month old. Wilkinson began playing youth soccer at age four with Harbour City FC (now part of Nanaimo United FC). She later played youth soccer with the Vancouver Island Wave, before joining the Whitecaps FC Girls Elite in August 2018.

== College career ==
In November 2019, Wilkinson committed to attend Arizona State University in the fall of 2020 to play for the women's soccer team. On April 2, 2021, she scored her first collegiate goal in a match against the California Golden Bears. She scored again in the next match two days later on April 4 against the Stanford Cardinal. At the end of her first season, she was named to the Pac-12 Conference All-Freshman Team. She was also named to the Pac-12 Fall Academic Honor Roll in both 2021 and 2022.

In 2023, she transferred to Texas A&M University to play for the women's soccer team. On September 7, 2023, she scored her first goals, netting a brace in an 8-0 victory over the On October 22, 2023, she scored a hat trick in a 4-3 victory over the Tennessee Volunteers, which earned her SEC Offensive Player of the Week honours. At the end of the 2023 season, she was named the Team Offensive MVP, after finishing as the team's leading scorer with 10 goals. On October 4, 2024, she scored two goals and added an assist in a 4-1 victory over the Ole Miss Rebels. She was named to the Academic All-District team in both 2023 and 2024.

== Club career ==
In 2023 and 2024, Wilkinson played with Harbourside FC in League1 British Columbia.

In January 2025, she signed a professional contract with Northern Super League club Ottawa Rapid FC. She made her debut on July 10, 2025, in a substitute appearance against AFC Toronto. She scored her first goal for the Rapid on September 20, 2025, scoring the last of Ottawa's goals in a 3–0 win over the Vancouver Rise.

== International career ==
In November 2018, Wilkinson debuted in the Canadian national program, attending a camp with the Canada U17. She was then named to the roster for the 2018 FIFA U-17 Women's World Cup.

In 2020, she was named to the Canada U20 for the 2020 CONCACAF Women's U-20 Championship. In November 2020, she was nominated for the Canada Soccer Youth Player of the Year. In January 2022, she was called up to a training camp with the U20s.
