= Lucas Kirnon =

Montserratean footballer (born 2003)

Personal information
- Full name: Lucas William Kirnon
- Date of birth: October 25, 2003 (age 23)
- Place of birth: Preston, England
- Height: 5 ft 10 in (1.78 m)
- Position: Defender

Team information
- Current team: Kamloops United FC
- Number: 8

Youth career
- Preston North End
- Salford City

College career
Years	Team	Apps	(Gls)
2024–	Thompson Rivers WolfPack	11	(0)

Senior career*
Years	Team	Apps	(Gls)
2022	Salford City	0	(0)
2022	→ Newcastle Town (loan)	6	(0)
2022–2024	Garstang		
2025–	Kamloops United FC	6	(2)

International career^{‡}
2022–	Montserrat	18	(0)
- * Club domestic league appearances and goals as of May 25, 2025 ‡ National team caps and goals as of 15:48, 13 November 2026 (UTC)

Lucas William Kirnon (born 25 October 2003) is a footballer who plays for Kamloops United FC in League1 British Columbia. Born in England, he represents Montserrat at international level.

== Early life ==
Kirnon played youth football with the youth systems of Preston North End and Salford City.

== University career ==
In 2024, he began attending Thompson Rivers University in Canada, where he played for the men's soccer team.

== Club career ==
In January 2022, Kirnon was loaned by Salford City to Newcastle Town in the eighth tier Northern Premier League Division One West. He made six appearances for Newcastle Town.

He later played with Garstang in the tenth tier North West Counties Football League Division One North.

In 2025, he played with Kamloops United FC in League1 British Columbia.

== International career ==
Since 2022, Kirnon has represented the Montserrat national team.
