= Juan de Fuca Plate (soccer) =

British Columbian soccer trophy

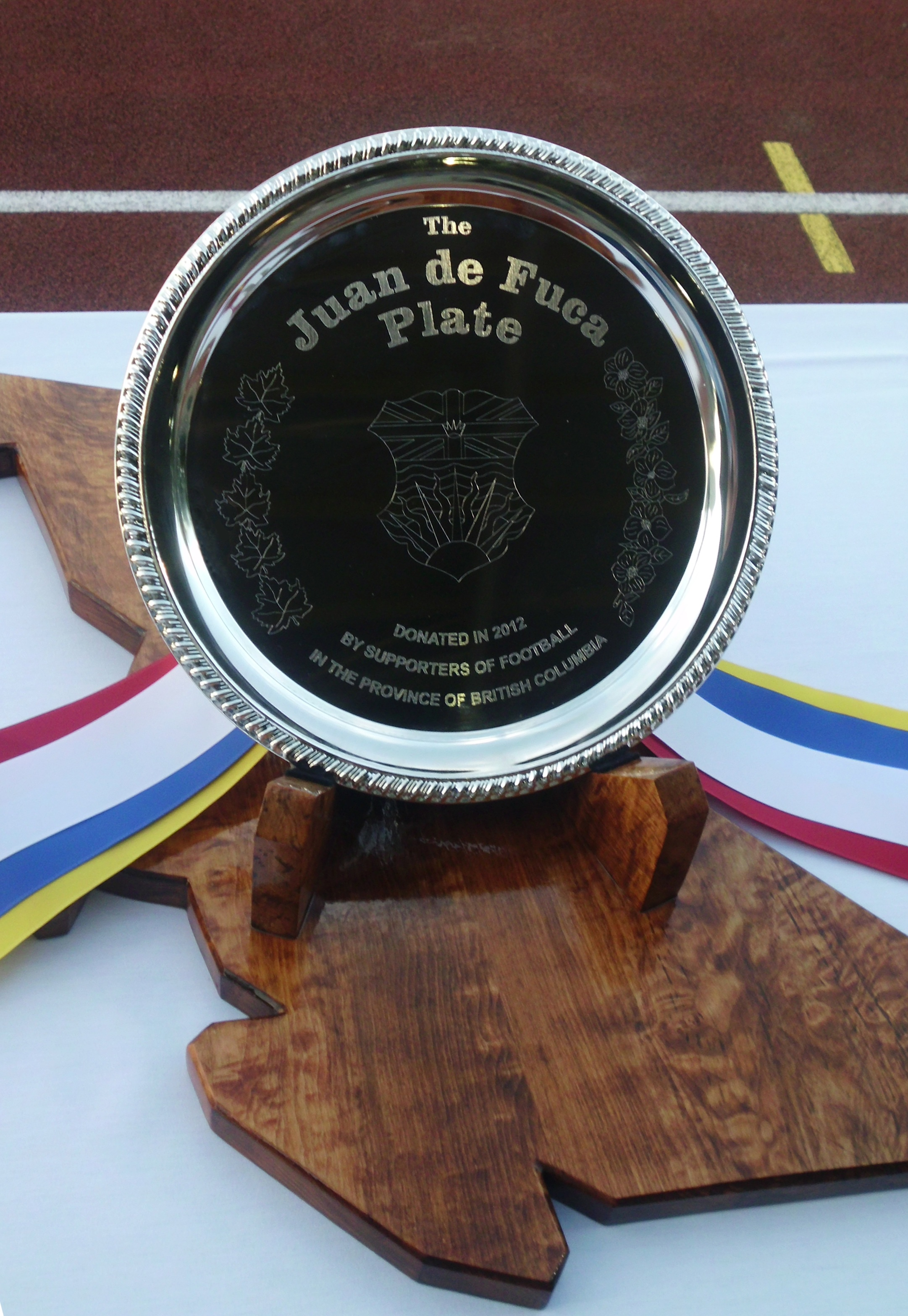
- The Juan de Fuca Plate on display
- Founded: 2012
- Region: British Columbia
- Teams: 8 (2026)
- Current champions: Whitecaps/Rise Academies (5th title)
- Most championships: Whitecaps/Rise Academies (5 titles)
- Website: https://www.juandefucaplate.ca/

The Juan de Fuca Plate is an annual trophy awarded by supporters to the best semi-professional team in the Canadian province of British Columbia. The trophy is currently awarded to the British Columbia Premier League club who accrues the greatest number of combined points across the men's and women's divisions. From 2012 through 2019, it was awarded to the winner of the season series of matches played between British Columbian teams in the Premier Development League (later known as USL League Two).

== History ==
The Juan de Fuca Plate was established in January 2012 by supporters of the Victoria Highlanders and Vancouver Whitecaps U-23 (Lake Side Buoys, Vancouver Southsiders, and Curva Collective), inspired by the Voyageurs Cup and Cascadia Cup to recognize high-level soccer in the province of British Columbia. The trophy was funded through the donations of 24 fans of the two clubs to purchase the plate, which has a base made of BC maple in the shape of the province, as well as a banner to be displayed at matches. It was named after the Strait of Juan de Fuca and the Juan de Fuca Plate, which are located just off the coast of British Columbia. From its creation, the trophy was not tied to any specific league and meant to be awarded to the best British Columbian team in the top level non-professional league with multiple teams, based on their matches against each other, which at the time was the Premier Development League.

The inaugural Juan de Fuca Plate was contested between the three BC-based PDL clubs - Victoria Highlanders, Vancouver Whitecaps U23, and the Fraser Valley Mariners. The first match occurred on May 13, 2012, at Royal Athletic Park in Victoria, British Columbia between the Victoria Highlanders and the Vancouver Whitecaps U-23. Whitecaps player Tan Long scored the first goal in Juan de Fuca Plate history in the 40th minute, while the first native British Columbian to score was Ben Fisk in the second match of the Plate. The actual Plate itself debuted for the first time July 8, 2012 in the match between the Whitecaps FC and Highlanders. The Whitecaps U23 won the inaugural title.

In 2013, the Plate became a two-team tournament following the Mariners decision to drop down to the Pacific Coast League. The Whitecaps U23 once again won the title in 2013, while the Highlanders won their first title the following year in 2014. After the 2014 season, the Whitecaps U23 PDL team was disbanded due to the creation of a professional second team, Whitecaps FC 2, in USL Pro, leaving the future of the tournament uncertain, with the tournament going on hiatus for 2015 and 2016.

Following the purchase of the PDL Washington Crossfire by a Vancouver-based group in December 2016, which became the TSS FC Rovers, the Juan de Fuca Plate returned in 2017. In the revived two-team tournament in 2017, the Highlanders claimed their second title. In 2018, the TSS Rovers won their first title, defeating the Highlanders over the three legs.

In December 2019, the Victoria Highlanders announced that they will be leaving USL League Two citing possible future sanctioning issues between club and federations involved in playing in cross-border leagues, departing for the Pacific Coast Soccer League for 2020, while plans were made for League1 BC inclusion for 2021. However, the TSS Rovers and Victoria Highlanders announced that the Juan de Fuca Plate would be contested in 2020, even though both clubs were not in the same league, however, it and a possible 2021 competition were both cancelled due to the COVID-19 pandemic.

Beginning in 2022, League 1 British Columbia (re-branded as British Columbia Premier League in 2026) was established as a new semi-professional league in British Columbia (with some of the former PDL clubs joining the league - TSS Rovers, Victoria Highlanders, and the Whitecaps FC Academy). It was announced that the club whose teams accrue the greatest number of points across both the men's and women's divisions in an aggregate table would win the Juan de Fuca plate.

== Results ==
Team	Titles
Whitecaps FC Academy / U–23	5 (2012, 2013, 2023, 2024, 2026)
TSS FC Rovers	2 (2018, 2019)
Victoria Highlanders FC	2 (2014, 2017)
Nautsa’mawt FC (Note: Nautsa’mawt FC was known as Varsity FC when they won their 2022 title.)	1 (2022)
Altitude FC	1 (2025)

== Year-by-year results ==
=== Summary ===
Year	League	Teams	Champions
2012	PDL	3	Whitecaps FC U-23
2013	PDL	2	Whitecaps FC U-23
2014	PDL	2	Victoria Highlanders FC
2015	PDL	0	Not awarded
2016	PDL	1	Not awarded
2017	PDL	2	Victoria Highlanders FC
2018	PDL	2	TSS FC Rovers
2019	USL2	2	TSS FC Rovers
2020	N/A	Not awarded	
2021	N/A	Not awarded	
2022	L1BC	7	Varsity FC
2023	L1BC	8	Whitecaps FC Academy
2024	L1BC	7	Whitecaps FC Academy
2025	L1BC	9	Altitude FC
2026	BCPL	8	Whitecaps and Rise Academies

=== PDL era ===
==== 2012 ====
Team	Pld	W	D	L	GF	GA	GD	Pts
#5 Whitecaps U-23	6	4	1	1	16	6	+10	13
#6 Victoria Highlanders	6	4	1	1	12	6	+6	13
#8 Fraser Valley Mariners	6	0	0	6	1	17	–16	0

May 13, 2012	Victoria Highlanders FC	1–1	Vancouver Whitecaps FC U-23	Victoria
	Gorman 45'	Report	Long 40'	Stadium: Royal Athletic Park; Attendance: 1,172

May 23, 2012	Vancouver Whitecaps FC U-23	4–0	Fraser Valley Mariners	Burnaby
	Fisk 31'; Clarke 39'; Long 74', 84'	Report		Stadium: Simon Fraser University

June 2, 2012	Victoria Highlanders FC	4–0	Fraser Valley Mariners	Victoria
	Stephens 15', 27'; Gorman 17'; Plavsic 75'	Report		Stadium: Royal Athletic Park

June 3, 2012	Fraser Valley Mariners	0–2	Victoria Highlanders FC	Abbotsford
		Report	Gorman 77'; Amani 83'	Stadium: Bateman Park

June 9, 2012	Victoria Highlanders FC	2–4	Vancouver Whitecaps FC U-23	Victoria
	Gorman 64'; Stephens 90'	Report	Fisk 60'; Marousek 77'; Jackson 83'; Froese 90'	Stadium: Royal Athletic Park

June 20, 2012	Fraser Valley Mariners	0–4	Vancouver Whitecaps FC U-23	Abbotsford
		Report	Farenhorst 33', 52'; Hundal 75'; Marquez 90'	Stadium: Bateman Park

July 2, 2012	Fraser Valley Mariners	0–1	Victoria Highlanders FC	Abbotsford
		Report	Plavsic 90'	Stadium: Bateman Park

July 8, 2012	Vancouver Whitecaps FC U-23	1–2	Victoria Highlanders FC	Richmond
	Hundal 66'	Report	Burbeary 6', 15'	Stadium: Minoru Park

July 11, 2012	Vancouver Whitecaps FC U-23	2–1	Fraser Valley Mariners	Burnaby
	Hundal 81'; Dosanjh 83'	Report	Isidro 63'	Stadium: Swangard Stadium

==== 2013 ====
Team	Pld	W	D	L	GF	GA	GD	Pts
#3 Whitecaps U-23	3	1	1	1	8	7	+1	4
#1 Victoria Highlanders	3	1	1	1	7	8	–1	4

May 17, 2013	Vancouver Whitecaps FC U-23	2–3	Victoria Highlanders FC	UBC Endowment Lands
	Cousens 52', 87'	Report	Hughes 50', 81'; O'Neill 53'	Stadium: Thunderbird Stadium

May 31, 2013	Victoria Highlanders FC	3–5	Vancouver Whitecaps FC U-23	Victoria
	Hughes 9', 56'; Levis 15'	Report	Bassi 25'; Cousens 37', 87'; Abdallah 46'; Dosanjh 58'	Stadium: Royal Athletic Park; Attendance: 2,044

June 28, 2013	Vancouver Whitecaps FC U-23	1–1	Victoria Highlanders FC	UBC Endowment Lands
	Plavsic 23'	Report	Levis 40'	Stadium: Thunderbird Stadium

==== 2014 ====
Team	Pld	W	D	L	GF	GA	GD	Pts
#2 Victoria Highlanders	2	2	0	0	8	6	+2	6
#3 Whitecaps U-23	2	0	0	2	6	8	–2	0

May 4, 2014	Victoria Highlanders FC	3–2	Vancouver Whitecaps FC U-23	Victoria
	Basso 34'; Barrett 84'; O'Neill 90+2' (pen.)	Report	Cook 29'; Musse 82'	Stadium: Royal Athletic Park; Attendance: 1,412

May 23, 2014	Vancouver Whitecaps FC U-23	4–5	Victoria Highlanders FC	UBC Endowment Lands
	Froese 20'; Steward 39'; Cousens 49', 72'	Report	Stokes 4'; Ashlee 7'; Basso 9', 34'; Sturrock 89'	Stadium: Thunderbird Stadium

==== 2017 ====
Team	Pld	W	D	L	GF	GA	GD	Pts
#4 Victoria Highlanders	3	2	0	1	4	3	+1	6
#6 TSS FC Rovers	3	1	0	2	3	4	–1	3

June 23, 2017	TSS FC Rovers	0–1	Victoria Highlanders FC	Burnaby
		Report	Goto 88'	Stadium: Swangard Stadium

June 25, 2017	TSS FC Rovers	3–1	Victoria Highlanders FC	Burnaby
	Davidson 55'; Mat. Polisi 70', 86'	Report	Goto 88'	Stadium: Swangard Stadium

July 9, 2017	Victoria Highlanders FC	2–0	TSS FC Rovers	Victoria
	Nelson 29'; Heath 53'	Report		Stadium: Centennial Stadium

==== 2018 ====
Team	Pld	W	D	L	GF	GA	GD	Pts
#4 TSS FC Rovers	3	2	0	1	5	4	+1	6
#5 Victoria Highlanders	3	1	0	2	4	5	–1	3

May 27, 2018	Victoria Highlanders FC	2–3	TSS FC Rovers	Victoria
	Hundal 38'; Bent 44'	Report	De Graaf 10'; Glennon 42'; Gardner 75'	Stadium: Centennial Stadium

June 3, 2018	TSS FC Rovers	2–1	Victoria Highlanders FC	Burnaby
	Verhoven 17', 23'	Report	Montgomery 90'	Stadium: Swangard Stadium

June 29, 2018	Victoria Highlanders FC	1–0	TSS FC Rovers	Victoria
	Montgomery 85'	Report		Stadium: Centennial Stadium

==== 2019 ====
Team	Pld	W	D	L	GF	GA	GD	Pts
#6 TSS FC Rovers	2	1	0	1	3 (Note: Vancouver TSS FC Rovers won 3–1 on away goals.)	3	0	3
#4 Victoria Highlanders	2	1	0	1	3	3	0	3

June 7, 2019	TSS Rovers FC	0–1	Victoria Highlanders FC	Burnaby
19:00		Report	Shumbusho 44' (pen.)	Stadium: Swangard Stadium; Referee: Seyed Mohammad Mohseni

July 5, 2019	Victoria Highlanders FC	2–3	TSS Rovers FC	Saanich
19:15	Takano 6' (pen.); Davidson 60'	Report	Pang 10'; Rahieme 44'; Polisi 45' (pen.)	Stadium: Centennial Stadium; Referee: Cole Shoemaker

=== L1BC/BCPL era ===
Beginning in 2022, the Juan de Fuca Plate would be awarded to the League1 British Columbia (later re-branded as British Columbia Premier League) club with the highest combined point total between the men's and women's divisions.

==== 2022 ====
Pos	Team	Pld	W	D	L	GF	GA	GD	Pts
1	Varsity FC (C)	24	20	1	3	58	20	+38	61
2	TSS FC Rovers	24	12	7	5	46	30	+16	43
3	Whitecaps FC Academy	24	12	5	7	44	38	+6	41
4	Unity FC	24	11	3	10	40	34	+6	36
5	Victoria Highlanders FC	24	6	3	15	35	50	−15	21
6	Altitude FC	24	5	4	15	25	46	−21	19
7	Rivers FC	24	4	5	15	24	54	−30	17

Source: Juan de Fuca Plate
(C) Champions

==== 2023 ====
Pos	Team	Pld	W	D	L	GF	GA	GD	Pts
1	Whitecaps FC Academy (C)	28	16	8	4	73	31	+42	56
2	TSS FC Rovers	28	15	5	8	55	35	+20	50
3	Nautsa’mawt FC	28	13	7	8	57	35	+22	46
4	Victoria Highlanders FC	28	13	6	9	34	35	−1	45
5	Unity FC	28	12	8	8	61	40	+21	44
6	Altitude FC	28	6	8	14	36	51	−15	26
7	Harbourside FC	28	6	6	16	32	70	−38	24
8	Rivers FC	28	5	4	19	35	86	−51	19

Source: Juan de Fuca Plate
(C) Champions

==== 2024 ====
Pos	Team	Pld	W	D	L	GF	GA	GD	Pts
1	Whitecaps FC Academy (C)	24	15	6	3	70	29	+41	51
2	TSS FC Rovers	24	12	5	7	51	43	+8	41
3	Unity FC	24	11	6	7	47	35	+12	39
4	Altitude FC	24	8	7	9	36	47	−11	31
5	Burnaby FC	24	7	5	12	42	55	−13	26
6	Harbourside FC	24	7	4	13	36	51	−15	25
7	Rivers FC	24	5	5	14	30	48	−18	20

Source: Juan de Fuca Plate
(C) Champions

==== 2025 ====
Pos	Team	Pld	W	D	L	GF	GA	GD	Pts
1	Altitude FC (C)	32	21	7	4	77	26	+51	70
2	TSS FC Rovers	32	17	6	9	70	42	+28	57
3	Whitecaps & Rise Academies	32	16	3	13	74	55	+19	51
4	Langley United	32	15	6	11	56	50	+6	51
5	Unity FC	32	12	11	9	66	61	+5	47
6	Burnaby FC	32	10	8	14	43	56	−13	38
7	Evolution FC	32	9	8	15	46	69	−23	35
8	Kamloops United FC	32	8	5	19	44	79	−35	29
9	Nanaimo United FC	32	6	6	20	39	77	−38	24

Source: L1BC Schedules and Standings
(C) Champions

==== 2026 ====
Pos	Team	Pld	W	D	L	GF	GA	GD	Pts
1	Whitecaps and Rise Academies (C)	28	20	1	7	75	35	+40	61
2	Langley United	28	18	5	5	62	30	+32	59
3	TSS Rovers FC	28	16	5	7	47	34	+13	53
4	Altitude FC	28	15	5	8	69	39	+30	50
5	Unity FC	28	8	3	17	44	68	−24	27
6	Burnaby FC	28	7	5	16	44	68	−24	26
7	Nanaimo United FC	28	5	7	16	33	53	−20	22
8	Kamloops United FC	28	5	5	18	21	68	−47	20

First match(es) will be played: unknown. Source: BCPL Schedules and Standings
(C) Champions
