= Iván Mejía =

Canadian-Colombian soccer player

Personal information
- Full name: Iván Francisco Mejía Yepes
- Date of birth: May 9, 2001 (age 25)
- Place of birth: Medellín, Colombia
- Position: Forward

Team information
- Current team: Langley United
- Number: 10

Youth career
- Deportivo Cali
- 2015–2018: Mountain United FC
- 2018–2019: Vancouver Whitecaps FC

College career
Years	Team	Apps	(Gls)
2022	UFV Cascades	15	(2)

Senior career*
Years	Team	Apps	(Gls)
2022–2023	TSS FC Rovers	11+	(6+)
2023	Vancouver FC	1	(0)
2024	TSS FC Rovers	10	(2)
2024	Al Qabila	5	(1)
2025	TSS FC Rovers	16	(14)
2026–	Langley United	13	(7)
- * Club domestic league appearances and goals as of October 7, 2026

Iván Francisco Mejía Yepes (born May 9, 2001) is a Colombian footballer who play for Langley United in the British Columbia Premier League.

== Early life ==
Mejía began playing youth soccer in Colombia with Deportivo Cali. At age 14, he moved to Canada with his family, where he began playing with Mountain United FC. In August 2018, he joined the Vancouver Whitecaps Academy in August 2018. He later played at the senior amateur level with North Vancouver FC, BB5 United, and FC Tigers Vancouver.

== University career ==
In 2022, Mejía began attending the University of the Fraser Valley, where he played for the men's soccer team. On September 18, he scored his first goal in a 5–3 victory over the Saskatchewan Huskies. He scored his second goal on September 30 against the UBC Okanagan Heat. At the end of the season, he was named to the Canada West All-Rookie Team.

== Club career ==
In 2022, Mejía joined semi-professional side TSS FC Rovers in League1 British Columbia. On April 19, 2023, he scored in a Canadian Championship upset victory over professional Canadian Premier League side Valour FC.

In August 2023, he signed a professional contract with Vancouver FC of the Canadian Premier League, after having begun training with the club in late June. On August 6, he made his professional debut in a substitute appearance against Valour FC.

He returned to TSS FC Rovers in League1 British Columbia for the 2024 season.

In September 2024, he signed with Al Qabila in UAE Third Division League.

In 2025, he again returned to the TSS FC Rovers. On April 12, 2025, he scored a hat trick in a 6–1 victory over the Whitecaps FC Academy.

In 2026, he played with Langley United in the British Columbia Premier League (re-branded from League1 British Columbia).

== Career statistics ==
As of October 7, 2026

Club	Season	League			Playoffs		National cup		Continental		Total	
Club	Season	Division	Apps	Goals	Apps	Goals	Apps	Goals	Apps	Goals	Apps	Goals
TSS FC Rovers	2022	League1 British Columbia	?	?	?	?	–		–		?	?
TSS FC Rovers	2023	League1 British Columbia	11	6	1	0	2	1	–		14	7
Vancouver FC	2023	Canadian Premier League	1	0	–		0	0	–		1	0
TSS FC Rovers	2024	League1 British Columbia	10	2	2	1	1	0	–		13	3
Al Qabila	2024–25	UAE Third Division League	5	1	–		–		–		5	1
TSS FC Rovers	2025	League1 British Columbia	16	14	–		1	0	–		17	14
Langley United	2026	British Columbia Premier League	13	7	–		1	0	–		14	7
Career total			56	30	3	1	5	1	0	0	64	32
