= 2023 League1 British Columbia season =

League1 British Columbia
- Season: 2023
- Dates: April 29 – July 23 (regular season); July 28 – August 5 (playoffs)
- Champions: Whitecaps FC Academy (men); Whitecaps FC Girls Elite (women)
- Juan de Fuca Plate: Whitecaps FC Academy (3rd title)

The 2023 League1 British Columbia season was the second season of play for League1 British Columbia, a pro-am league in the Canadian soccer league system. Eight clubs participated in both the men's and women's divisions.

== Format ==
The regular season was contested by eight clubs and ran from April 29 to July 23, 2023. Each team played 14 games in a double round-robin format with seven games at home and seven on the road. The top four teams advanced to the playoffs with the Championship Final held on the BC Day long weekend. The men's and women's divisions used identical schedules with the two matches being played as double-headers on the same day.

== Men's division ==
The teams played each other team twice (home and away) for a 14-game season, with the top four teams advancing to the playoffs. The winner of the regular season were to qualify for the 2024 Canadian Championship. As the Victoria Highlanders did not return to the league in 2024, the Canadian Championship spot was later awarded to runner-ups, TSS Rovers.

=== League table ===
Pos	Team	Pld	W	D	L	GF	GA	GD	Pts	Qualification
1	Victoria Highlanders FC	14	10	2	2	20	9	+11	32	Playoffs (Note: Victoria Highlanders originally qualified for the Canadian Championship, but the team withdrew from the 2024 L1BC season in early 2024 prior to the start of the competition.)
2	TSS Rovers	14	9	2	3	32	10	+22	29	Playoffs and Canadian Championship (Note: Due to the Victoria Highlanders withdrawing from the Canadian Championship, the League1 BC berth was given to the TSS Rovers.)
3	Whitecaps FC Academy (C)	14	5	7	2	19	14	+5	22	Playoffs
4	Unity FC	14	5	5	4	26	15	+11	20	Playoffs
5	Nautsa’mawt FC	14	4	5	5	11	18	−7	17	
6	Rivers FC	14	4	4	6	17	28	−11	16	
7	Altitude FC	14	2	3	9	18	33	−15	9	
8	Harbourside FC	14	1	4	9	10	26	−16	7	

Source: League1 BC
(C) Champions

=== Playoffs ===
Semi-finals; July 29
1	Victoria Highlanders FC	3
4	Unity FC	2
2	TSS Rovers	0
3	Whitecaps FC Academy	4

Final; August 5
1	Victoria Highlanders FC	1 (7)
3	Whitecaps FC Academy	1 (8)

Semi-finals

July 29, 2023	Victoria Highlanders FC	3–2	Unity FC	Victoria, British Columbia
1:00 PM	Walter 7'; Preston 39'; Henman 69'	Report	Fussell 30'; Shumbusho 52'	Stadium: Centennial Stadium

July 29, 2023	TSS Rovers	0–4	Whitecaps FC Academy	Vancouver, British Columbia
3:00 PM		Report	Norman 6'; Ghasemi 58'; Mann 71'; Wathuta 85'	Stadium: Ken Woods Field

Final

August 5, 2023	Victoria Highlanders FC	1–1 (7–8 p)	Whitecaps FC Academy	Vancouver, British Columbia
4:00 PM	Henman 45+1'	Report	Wathuta 60'	Stadium: BC Place
	Penalties
	Henman (penalty missed); Sagaste (penalty scored); Schaefer (penalty scored); Yousef (penalty scored); Gysbers (penalty scored); Bartolillo (penalty scored); Ando (penalty scored); Rogozinski (penalty scored); Hall (penalty missed)		(penalty scored) Manetta; (penalty scored) Baker; (penalty scored) Wathuta; (penalty missed) White; (penalty scored) Assaf; (penalty scored) Florent; (penalty scored) Ghasemi; (penalty scored) Mutombo; (penalty scored) Norman

=== Statistics ===
Top goalscorers
(does not include playoffs)

Rank	Player	Club	Goals
1	(Canada) Massud Habibullah	TSS Rovers	8
2	(Canada) Erik Edwardson	TSS Rovers	7
2	(Democratic Republic of the Congo) Victory Shumbusho	Unity FC	7
2	(Canada) Michael Hennessy	Whitecaps FC Academy	7
2	(Canada) Michael Henman	Victoria Highlanders FC	7
6	(Canada) Ivan Mejia	TSS Rovers	6
7	4 players tied		4

Source: L1BC

== Women's division ==
The winner of the women's regular season will qualify for the Women's Interprovincial Championship.

=== League table ===
Pos	Team	Pld	W	D	L	GF	GA	GD	Pts	Qualification
1	Whitecaps FC Girls Elite (C)	14	11	1	2	54	17	+37	34	Playoffs and Interprovincial Championship (Note: As regular season winners)
2	Nautsa’mawt FC	14	9	2	3	46	17	+29	29	Playoffs
3	Unity FC	14	7	3	4	35	25	+10	24	Playoffs and Interprovincial Championship (Note: As playoff runner-up (playoff champion already qualified))
4	TSS Rovers	14	6	3	5	23	25	−2	21	Playoffs
5	Harbourside FC	14	5	2	7	22	44	−22	17	
6	Altitude FC	14	4	5	5	18	18	0	17	
7	Victoria Highlanders FC	14	3	4	7	14	26	−12	13	
8	Rivers FC	14	1	0	13	18	58	−40	3	

Source: League1 BC
(C) Champions

=== Playoffs ===
The playoff champion (or runner-up if the winner is the same as the regular season winner) will qualify for the Women's Interprovincial Championship.

Semi-finals; July 29–30
1	Whitecaps FC Girls Elite	5
4	TSS Rovers	2
2	Nautsa’mawt FC	1
3	Unity FC	4

Final; August 5
1	Whitecaps FC Girls Elite	3
3	Unity FC	1

Semi-finals

July 29, 2023	Whitecaps FC Girls Elite	5–2	TSS Rovers	Vancouver, British Columbia
12:00 PM	Kimwemwe 16'; Yee 21'; Perrault 73', 77'; Hunter 81'	Report	Friesen 2'; Virk 86'	Stadium: Ken Woods Field

July 30, 2023	Nautsa’mawt FC	1–4	Unity FC	Vancouver, British Columbia
1:00 PM	Tome 64'	Report	Buttar 21'; Crowther 33'; James 53'; Bergen 59'	Stadium: Thunderbird Stadium

Final

August 5, 2023	Whitecaps FC Girls Elite	3–1	Unity FC	Vancouver, British Columbia
1:00 PM	Hunter 37', 85' (pen.); Kimwemwe 52'	Report	James 35'	Stadium: BC Place; Referee: Sydney Berridge

=== Statistics ===
Top goalscorers
(does not include playoffs)

Rank	Player	Club	Goals
1	(Canada) Kierra Blundell	Whitecaps FC Girls Elite	10
1	(Canada) Katalin Tolnai	Nautsa’mawt FC	10
3	(Canada) Delana Friesen	TSS Rovers	7
4	(Canada) Bryana Buttar	Unity FC	6
4	(Canada) Anna Hauer	Whitecaps FC Girls Elite	6
4	(Canada) Jaime Perrault	Whitecaps FC Girls Elite	6
7	(Canada) Charlotte Ring	Altitude FC	5
7	(Albania) Esi Lufo	Rivers FC	5
7	(Canada) Sophie Crowther	Unity FC	5
7	(Canada) Kaylee Hunter	Whitecaps FC Girls Elite	5
11	5 players tied		4

Source: L1BC

== Juan de Fuca Plate ==
The Juan de Fuca Plate is awarded to the League1 British Columbia club with the highest combined point total between the men's and women's divisions in regular season matches.

Pos	Team	Pld	W	D	L	GF	GA	GD	Pts
1	Whitecaps FC Academy (C)	28	16	8	4	73	31	+42	56
2	TSS FC Rovers	28	15	5	8	55	35	+20	50
3	Nautsa’mawt FC	28	13	7	8	57	35	+22	46
4	Victoria Highlanders FC	28	13	6	9	34	35	−1	45
5	Unity FC	28	12	8	8	61	40	+21	44
6	Altitude FC	28	6	8	14	36	51	−15	26
7	Harbourside FC	28	6	6	16	32	70	−38	24
8	Rivers FC	28	5	4	19	35	86	−51	19

Source: Juan de Fuca Plate
(C) Champions
