= Sara Maglio =

Canadian soccer player

Personal information
- Date of birth: March 17, 1978 (age 48)
- Place of birth: North Vancouver, British Columbia, Canada
- Height: 1.68 m (5 ft 6 in)
- Position: Forward

College career
Years	Team	Apps	(Gls)
1996–1999	Simon Fraser Red Leafs		

Senior career*
Years	Team	Apps	(Gls)
2001–2005	Vancouver Whitecaps		

International career
1997–1999	Canada	5	(0)
- * Club domestic league appearances and goals

Sara Maglio (born March 17, 1978) is a Canadian soccer player who played as a forward for the Canada women's national soccer team.

== College career ==
She played college soccer for Simon Fraser University.

== International career ==
She was part of the team at the 1999 FIFA Women's World Cup.

== Personal life ==
She was born in North Vancouver and raised in Coquitlam, British Columbia. Maglio is of Italian descent.

She married Steve Kindel. Their son, Benjamin Kindel, was born in 2007. Their daughter, Lacey Kindel, was born in 2009.

Benjamin has represented the Canada under-18 ice hockey team, and Lacey has represented the Canada under-17 soccer team.
