= 2024 League1 British Columbia season =

League1 British Columbia
- Season: 2024
- Dates: April 27 – July 21 (regular season); July 26 – August 4 (playoffs)
- Champions: TSS FC Rovers (2nd title); Whitecaps FC Girls Elite (3rd title)
- Juan de Fuca Plate: Whitecaps FC Academy (3rd title)
- Matches: 45
- Goals: 168 (3.73 per match)
- Top goalscorer: Billy Bagiopoulous (12 goals)

The 2024 League1 British Columbia season was the third season of play for League1 British Columbia, a pro-am league in the Canadian soccer league system. Seven clubs participated in both the men's and women's divisions.

== Changes from 2023 ==
Burnaby FC joined the league as a new expansion club in both the men's and women's divisions. However, both Nautsa’mawt FC and Victoria Highlanders FC departed the league, bringing the league down to seven clubs. In addition, the Highlanders vacated their spot in the 2024 Canadian Championship, being replaced by TSS FC Rovers.

== Men's division ==
The teams played each other team twice (home and away) for a 12-game season, with the top four teams advancing to the playoffs. The winner of the regular season will qualify for the 2025 Canadian Championship.

=== League table ===
Pos	Team	Pld	W	D	L	GF	GA	GD	Pts	Qualification
1	TSS FC Rovers (C)	12	7	3	2	30	15	+15	24	Playoffs and Canadian Championship
2	Altitude FC	12	6	3	3	20	14	+6	21	Playoffs
3	Whitecaps FC Academy	12	5	4	3	22	22	0	19	Playoffs
4	Harbourside FC	12	5	2	5	25	24	+1	17	Playoffs
5	Unity FC	12	4	4	4	20	19	+1	16	
6	Rivers FC	12	4	1	7	18	26	−8	13	
7	Burnaby FC	12	1	3	8	19	34	−15	6	

Source: L1BC Schedules and Standings
(C) Champions

=== Playoffs ===
Semi-finals; July 26–28
1	TSS FC Rovers	4
4	Harbourside FC	1
2	Altitude FC	3
3	Whitecaps FC Academy	1

Final; August 4
1	TSS FC Rovers	3
2	Altitude FC	2

Semi-finals

July 26	TSS FC Rovers	4–1	Harbourside FC	Burnaby, British Columbia
10:30 PM	Proctor 5'; Mejia 14'; Habibullah 45+1'; Poon 75'		Purcell 11'	Stadium: Swangard Stadium; Referee: Ivan Jecanski

July 28	Altitude FC	3–1	Whitecaps FC Academy	North Vancouver, British Columbia
4:00 PM	Herbert 16', 89'; Booth 79'		Stiver 71'	Stadium: Kinsmen Field; Referee: Amer Ramic

Final

August 4	TSS FC Rovers	3–2	Altitude FC	Burnaby, British Columbia
7:00 PM	Habibullah 1'; White 31'; Edwardson 87' (pen.)		Tinmouth 60'; Ahayo 84' (pen.)	Stadium: Swangard Stadium; Referee: David Schmidt-Schweda

=== Statistics ===
Top goalscorers
(does not include playoffs)

Rank	Player	Club	Goals
1	(Canada) Billy Bagiopoulos	Harbourside FC	12
2	(Canada) Massud Habibullah	TSS Rovers	7
3	(Canada) Carson Buschman-Dormond	Altitude FC	5
3	(Canada) Joel Badger	Unity FC	5
3	(Canada) Suka Behery	Harbourside FC	5
3	(Canada) Victory Shumbusho	Unity FC	5
7	9 players tied		4

Source: L1BC

==== Awards ====
Award	Player	Team	Ref
Player of the Year	Billy Bagiopoulos	Harbourside FC	
Young Player of the Year	Amoni Thomas	Whitecaps FC Academy	
Coach of the Year	Kevin Lindo	Harbourside FC	
Top Goalkeeper	Justyn Sandhu	TSS FC Rovers	
Top Defender	Nikolas White	TSS FC Rovers	
Top Midfielder	Suka Behery	Harbourside FC	
Top Forward	Billy Bagiopoulos	Harbourside FC	
Golden Boot (Top Scorer)	Billy Bagiopoulos	Harbourside FC	

== Women's division ==
The teams played each other team twice (home and away) for a 12-game season, with the top four teams advancing to the playoffs. The winner of the women's regular season will qualify for the Women's Interprovincial Championship.

=== League table ===
Pos	Team	Pld	W	D	L	GF	GA	GD	Pts	Qualification
1	Whitecaps FC Girls Elite (C)	12	10	2	0	48	7	+41	32	Playoffs and Inter-provincial Championship
2	Unity FC	12	7	2	3	27	16	+11	23	Playoffs
3	Burnaby FC	12	6	2	4	23	21	+2	20	Playoffs
4	TSS FC Rovers	12	5	2	5	21	28	−7	17	Playoffs
5	Altitude FC	12	2	4	6	16	33	−17	10	
6	Harbourside FC	12	2	2	8	11	27	−16	8	
7	Rivers FC	12	1	4	7	10	24	−14	7	

Source: L1BC Schedules and Standings
(C) Champions

=== Playoffs ===
Semi-finals; July 26–28
1	Whitecaps FC Girls Elite	4
4	TSS FC Rovers	2
2	Unity FC	1(5)
3	Burnaby FC	1(6)

Final; August 4
1	Whitecaps FC Girls Elite	2
3	Burnaby FC	1

Semi-finals

July 26	Whitecaps FC Girls Elite	4–2	TSS FC Rovers	UBC Vancouver, BC
6:00 PM	Hunter 21'; Reed 34'; Anderson 81'; Longhurst 90'		Bishop 45+1'; Baxter 48'	Stadium: Thunderbird Stadium; Referee: Denzil Sharma

July 28	Unity FC	1–1 (5–6 SO)	Burnaby FC	Surrey, BC
2:00 PM	Crowther 29'		MacKenzie 81' (pen.)	Stadium: Cloverdale Athletic Park; Referee: Kelsey Carrothers
	Shootout
	Crowther (penalty scored); Robertson (penalty scored); Holz (penalty missed); Corneil (penalty scored); Rizzo (penalty scored); Hicks (penalty missed); Bazille (penalty scored); Pedersen (penalty missed)		Santoianni (penalty scored); Sheppard (penalty scored); Lopez (penalty scored); Scott (penalty missed); MacKenzie (penalty scored); Chescoe (penalty missed); Crozier (penalty scored); Sherwood (penalty scored)

Final

August 4	Whitecaps FC Girls Elite	2–1	Burnaby FC	Burnaby, British Columbia
1:00 PM	Hunter 31'; Hernandez Gray 50'		Sherwood 53'	Stadium: Swangard Stadium; Referee: O-Lin Metz

=== Statistics ===
Top goalscorers
(does not include playoffs)

Rank	Player	Club	Goals
1	(Canada) Kierra Blundell	Whitecaps FC Girls Elite	10
2	(Canada) Jeneva Hernandez-Gray	Whitecaps FC Girls Elite	8
2	(Canada) Kaylee Hunter	Whitecaps FC Girls Elite	8
4	(Canada) Shanya Dhindsa	Burnaby FC	6
5	(Canada) Jade Mitchell	Whitecaps FC Girls Elite	5
5	(Canada) Jenna Baxter	TSS Rovers	5
5	(Canada) Raegan MacKenzie	Burnaby FC	5
8	4 players tied		4

Source: L1BC

==== Awards ====
Award	Player	Team	Ref
Player of the Year	Jeneva Hernandez Gray	Whitecaps FC Girls Elite	
Young Player of the Year	Jeneva Hernandez Gray	Whitecaps FC Girls Elite	
Coach of the Year	Katie Collar	Whitecaps FC Girls Elite	
Top Goalkeeper	Kelsey Fisher	Rivers FC	
Top Defender	Elizabeth Hicks	Unity FC	
Top Midfielder	Jeneva Hernandez Gray	Whitecaps FC Girls Elite	
Top Forward	Kierra Blundell	Whitecaps FC Girls Elite	
Golden Boot (Top Scorer)	Kierra Blundell	Whitecaps FC Girls Elite	

== Juan de Fuca Plate ==
The Juan de Fuca Plate is awarded to the League1 British Columbia club with the highest combined point total between the men's and women's divisions in regular season matches.

Pos	Team	Pld	W	D	L	GF	GA	GD	Pts
1	Whitecaps FC Academy (C)	24	15	6	3	70	29	+41	51
2	TSS FC Rovers	24	12	5	7	51	43	+8	41
3	Unity FC	24	11	6	7	47	35	+12	39
4	Altitude FC	24	8	7	9	36	47	−11	31
5	Burnaby FC	24	7	5	12	42	55	−13	26
6	Harbourside FC	24	7	4	13	36	51	−15	25
7	Rivers FC	24	5	5	14	30	48	−18	20

Source: Juan de Fuca Plate
(C) Champions
