= Evolution FC =

Semi-professional soccer club

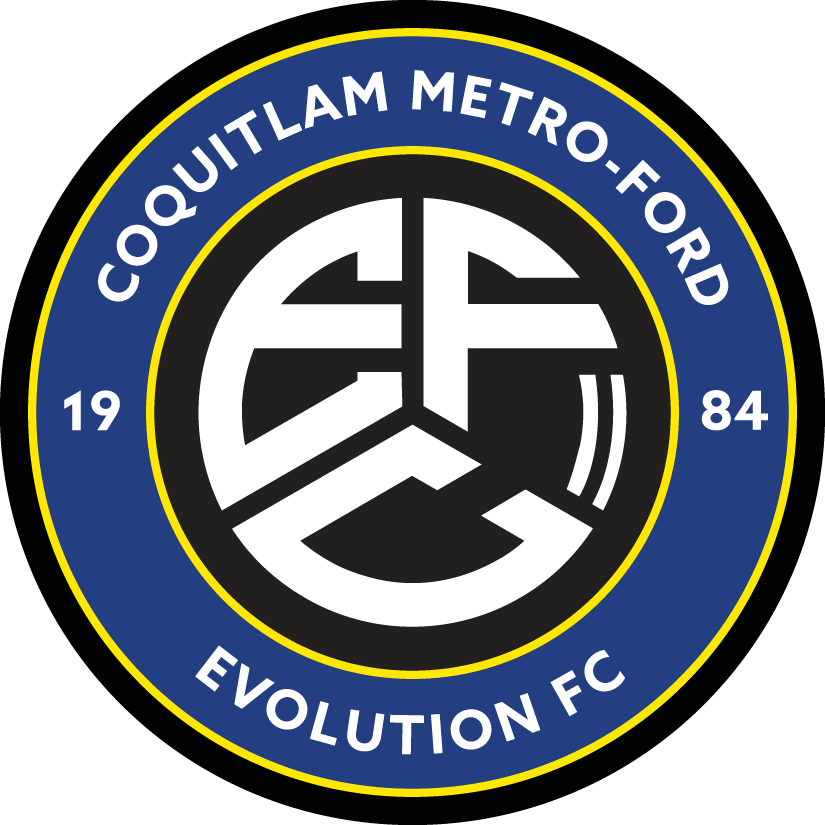
- Full name: Evolution Football Club
- Founded: 2024
- Dissolved: 2025; 1 year ago
- Stadium: Percy Perry Stadium
- Owner: Coquitlam Metro-Ford SC
- Head Coach: Les Krivak (men); Liam Carter (women)
- League: League1 British Columbia
- 2025: L1BC, 6th (men); L1BC, 6th (women)
- Website: evolutionfc.ca

Evolution FC was a Canadian semi-professional soccer club based in Coquitlam, British Columbia that last played in League1 British Columbia.

== History ==
In July 2024, it was announced that Coquitlam Metro-Ford SC was awarded an expansion franchise to play in the men's and women's divisions of League1 British Columbia for the 2025 season. The club will play out of Percy Perry Stadium at Town Centre Park, which has been the home of Coquitlam Metro-Ford SC for several years. The club played their inaugural matches on April 4, 2025, with both clubs drawing TSS FC Rovers 2-2, however the women's team illegally substituted a previously substituted player in the 90th minute, resulting in the match being changed to a 3-0 forfeit loss. In the following matchday on April 12, both teams earned their first victories with the men winning 1-0 and the women winning 3-1, both over Nanaimo United. They did not return to the league for the 2026 season.

== Seasons ==
=== Men ===
Season	League	Teams	Record	Rank	Playoffs	Juan de Fuca Plate	Ref
2025	League1 British Columbia	9	4–6–6	6th	–	7th (Note: The Juan de Fuca Plate is a combined men's and women's competition that combines both squads results)	

=== Women ===
Season	League	Teams	Record	Rank	Playoffs	Juan de Fuca Plate	Ref
2025	League1 British Columbia	9	5–2–9	6th	–	7th (Note: The Juan de Fuca Plate is a combined men's and women's competition that combines both squads results)	
