= Nanaimo United FC =

Semi-professional soccer club

- Full name: Nanaimo United Football Club
- Founded: 2022 (as Harbourside FC)
- Stadium: Q’unq’inuqwstuxw Stadium (Nanaimo District SS)
- Capacity: 1500
- Chairman: Jason Coates
- Head Coach: Kevin Lindo (men), Francisco Souza (women)
- League: League1 British Columbia
- 2025: L1BC, 9th (men); L1BC, 7th (women)
- Website: http://harboursidefc.ca/
Home colours

Nanaimo United Football Club (formerly Harbourside Football Club) is a Canadian semi-professional soccer club based in Nanaimo, British Columbia that plays in the British Columbia Premier League.

== History ==
Nanaimo United was first formed in 1903, under the name Nanaimo City AFC (before adopting the Nanaimo United name in 1908). In 2018, the club merged with Harbour City FC, keeping the Nanaimo United name, but developing a new logo that preserved elements from both clubs previous logos. In 2020, the club was inducted into British Columbia's Soccer Hall of Fame and Heritage Archive as an Organization of Distinction.

Habourside FC logo

The semi-professional team was officially unveiled on October 19, 2022, under the name Harbourside FC, as an expansion club in League1 British Columbia for the 2023 season in both the men's and women's division, with an affiliation with youth club Nanaimo United FC, as well as Vancouver Island University. Their home field will be at the Q’unq’inuqwstuxw Stadium of Nanaimo District Secondary School, with a capacity of 1500, with a goal of eventually expanding to a capacity of 3500. The majority of their inaugural squads featured a majority of players from the Nanaimo and Vancouver Island area, complemented by some players from outside of the Island.

The club debuted on April 29, 2023 against Unity FC in League1 British Columbia in both the men's and women's divisions. In their debut matches, the men drew 1-1, while the women were defeated 2-1, with the teams setting a League1 British Columbia record with 1216 people in attendance. The men's team earned the franchise's first win in a 1-0 victory over Nautsa’mawt FC on May 7. The women's team won their first ever match on May 13, defeating TSS FC Rovers.

In 2025, they announced that the team would be re-named Nanaimo United FC to match the youth club, which the team wanted to use as their name originally, but were denied due to league branding restrictions at the time, which were now lifted.

== Seasons ==
=== Men ===
Season	League	Teams	Record	Rank	Playoffs	Juan de Fuca Plate	Ref
2023	League1 British Columbia	8	1–2–9	8th	did not qualify	7th (Note: The Juan de Fuca Plate is a combined men's and women's competition that combines both squads results)	
2024	League1 British Columbia	7	5–2–5	4th	Semi-finals	6th	
2025	League1 British Columbia	9	2–3–11	9th	–	9th	
2026	British Columbia Premier League	8	5-3-6	4th	–	7th	

=== Women ===
Season	League	Teams	Record	Rank	Playoffs	Juan de Fuca Plate	Ref
2023	League1 British Columbia	8	5–2–7	5th	did not qualify	7th (Note: The Juan de Fuca Plate is a combined men's and women's competition that combines both squads results)	
2024	League1 British Columbia	7	2–2–8	6th	did not qualify	6th	
2025	League1 British Columbia	9	4–3–9	7th	–	9th	
2026	British Columbia Premier League	8	0-10-4	8th	–	7th	

== Notable former players ==
The following players have either played at the professional or international level, either before or after playing for the League1 British Columbia team:

- (Canada) Jazmine Wilkinson
