= 2025 League1 British Columbia season =

League1 British Columbia
- Season: 2025
- Dates: April 4 – July 26
- Champions: Langley United (men); Altitude FC (women)
- Juan de Fuca Plate: Altitude FC (1st title)

The 2025 League1 British Columbia season was the fourth season of play for League1 British Columbia, a pro-am league in the Canadian soccer league system. Nine clubs participated in both the men's and women's divisions. The season kicked off on April 4 as reigning champions TSS FC Rovers hosted debutants Evolution FC.

== Changes from 2024 ==
Langley United and Coquitlam-based Evolution FC joined the league as new expansion clubs in both the men's and women's divisions, bringing the league up to nine clubs. In addition, Rivers FC have rebranded as Kamloops United FC while Harbourside FC became Nanaimo United FC.

== Men's division ==
The teams played each other team twice (home and away) for a 16-game season. The league was won by Langley United, who qualified for the 2026 Canadian Championship.

=== League table ===
Pos	Team	Pld	W	D	L	GF	GA	GD	Pts	Qualification
1	Langley United (C)	16	10	3	3	39	22	+17	33	2026 Canadian Championship
2	TSS FC Rovers	16	10	2	4	41	20	+21	32	
3	Altitude FC	16	7	6	3	30	17	+13	27	
4	Burnaby FC	16	7	5	4	21	21	0	26	
5	Kamloops United FC	16	7	2	7	25	25	0	23	
6	Evolution FC	16	4	6	6	27	31	−4	18	
7	Unity FC	16	3	7	6	26	38	−12	16	
8	Whitecaps FC Academy	16	4	2	10	24	39	−15	14	
9	Nanaimo United FC	16	2	3	11	17	37	−20	9	

Source: L1BC Schedules and Standings
(C) Champions

=== Results table ===
Home \ Away	ALT	BUR	CMF	KAM	LAN	NAN	TSS	UNI	WFC
Altitude FC		0–0	3–0	4–2	4–3	0–0	1–0	2–2	1–2
Burnaby FC	2–1		2–2	0–3	1–2	2–2	0–3	4–0	3–0
CMF Evolution FC	2–2	0–1		2–0	1–1	3–1	1–2	2–2	4–3
Kamloops United FC	0–0	0–1	3–1		3–2	3–1	2–1	1–1	0–2
Langley United	2–0	1–1	3–2	2–0		4–0	3–0	3–5	3–0
Nanaimo United FC	0–2	0–1	0–1	0–4	1–3		1–2	1–1	3–1
TSS FC Rovers	2–2	7–1	2–2	4–0	1–3	6–1		2–1	2–1
Unity FC	0–5	0–2	2–2	4–3	1–1	1–4	0–1		3–3
Whitecaps FC Academy	0–3	0–0	4–2	0–1	2–3	3–2	1–6	2–3	

Source: "2025 Regular Season Schedule Men's League1 BC".
Legend: Blue = home team win; Yellow = draw; Red = away team win.

=== Statistics ===
Top goalscorers

Rank	Player	Club	Goals
1	(Colombia) Ivan Mejia	TSS FC Rovers	14
2	(Canada) Brody Thomas	Langley United	10
2	(Canada) Dominic Di Paola	Evolution FC	10
4	(Canada) Victory Shumbusho	Unity FC	9
5	(Canada) Carson Buschman-Dormond	Altitude FC	8
6	(Canada) Kyler Vojvodic	Whitecaps FC Academy	7
6	(Canada) Tyreese Meas	Altitude FC	7
8	(South Sudan) Emmanuel Santo Lado	Langley United	6
8	(Canada) Joel Badger	Langley United	6
8	(Canada) Michael Hennessy	TSS FC Rovers	6

Source: L1BC

== Women's division ==
The teams played each other team twice (home and away) for a 16-game season. Altitude FC won the regular season and thus qualified for the 2025 Inter-Provincial Championship.

=== League table ===
Pos	Team	Pld	W	D	L	GF	GA	GD	Pts	Qualification
1	Altitude FC (C)	16	14	1	1	47	9	+38	43	Inter-Provincial Championship
2	Vancouver Rise FC Academy	16	12	1	3	50	17	+33	37	
3	Unity FC	16	9	4	3	40	23	+17	31	
4	TSS Rovers FC	16	7	4	5	29	22	+7	25 (Note: TSS Rovers and Evolution FC's 2-2 draw was changed to a 3–0 win for TSS Rovers, due to the fielding of an ineligible player through an illegal substitution by Evolution)	
5	Langley United	16	5	3	8	18	28	−10	18	
6	Evolution FC	16	5	2	9	19	38	−19	17	
7	Nanaimo United FC	16	4	3	9	22	40	−18	15	
8	Burnaby FC	16	3	3	10	22	35	−13	12	
9	Kamloops United FC	16	1	3	12	19	54	−35	6	

Source: L1BC Schedules and Standings
(C) Champions

=== Statistics ===
Top goalscorers

Rank	Player	Club	Goals
1	(Canada) Jenna Baxter	Unity FC	9
2	(Canada) Quinn Johnson	Vancouver Rise FC Academy	8
3	(Jamaica) Jade Mitchell	Vancouver Rise FC Academy	7
3	(Canada) Jayda Thompson	Altitude FC	7
3	(Canada) Mansha Sidhu	Unity FC	7
6	(Canada) Bianca Patik	Vancouver Rise FC Academy	6
6	(Canada) Cara Freeman	Kamloops United FC	6
6	(Canada) Saira Johal	Burnaby FC	6
6	(Canada) Sofia Faremo	TSS FC Rovers	6
10	6 players tied		5

Source: L1BC

== Juan de Fuca Plate ==
The Juan de Fuca Plate is awarded to the League1 British Columbia club with the highest combined point total between the men's and women's divisions in regular season matches.

Pos	Team	Pld	W	D	L	GF	GA	GD	Pts
1	Altitude FC (C)	32	21	7	4	77	26	+51	70
2	TSS FC Rovers	32	17	6	9	70	42	+28	57
3	Whitecaps & Rise Academies	32	16	3	13	74	55	+19	51
4	Langley United	32	15	6	11	56	50	+6	51
5	Unity FC	32	12	11	9	66	61	+5	47
6	Burnaby FC	32	10	8	14	43	56	−13	38
7	Evolution FC	32	9	8	15	46	69	−23	35
8	Kamloops United FC	32	8	5	19	44	79	−35	29
9	Nanaimo United FC	32	6	6	20	39	77	−38	24

Source: L1BC Schedules and Standings
(C) Champions
