= Nanaimo District Secondary School =

Location
- 355 Wakesiah Avenue; Nanaimo, British Columbia, V9R 3K5; Canada; 49.16123°N 123.96255°W

Information
- School type: Public school
- Religious affiliation: Secular
- Founded: 1952
- School board: School District 68 Nanaimo-Ladysmith
- School number: 919586
- Principal: Jane Reynolds
- Grades: 8-12
- Enrollment: 1,545 (2024-25)
- Language: English, French immersion and Francophone
- Colours: Green, Black, and White
- Team name: Islanders
- Website: ndss.sd68.bc.ca

Nanaimo District Secondary School or Nanaimo District Community School (NDSS) is a public high school in Nanaimo, British Columbia, Canada built in 1952. Since then it has undergone several renovations, most notably the 1981 construction of the "tower", which houses a number of computer classes and several classrooms. The school has a capacity of about 1600 students. The school has a metal workshop, a woodwork shop, seven computer labs, two gymnasiums, a study hall, two cafeterias, an Automotive Shop, Distance Education programs, and the CTC (career and technical center). The school teaches students from grade 8 to grade 12. NDSS is also home to Nanaimo's French Immersion and Francophone programs.

== Location ==
NDSS is located at 355 Wakesiah Avenue in Nanaimo on Vancouver Island. The school is connected to the Nanaimo Aquatic Centre (NAC), and is across the road from the Nanaimo Ice Centre (NIC) and the Serauxmen Fields baseball diamonds. It is also adjacent to the Rotary Bowl and Vancouver Island University. The Q'unq'inuqwstuxw NDSS artificial Turf Field is situated behind the school bus loop and NAC.

== Clubs ==
Academic, Arts, and Culture Clubs

- Audio Visual Club/Film Society
- Chess Club
- Dungeons And Dragons club
- Eco Club
- Ethics Bowl
- Gender And Sexuality Alliance
- Model United Nations Club
- Musical Theatre
- Rap Club
- Youth Advocacy Group

Athletic Clubs

- Basketball
- Cheer Team
- Dance Team
- Football
- Gymnastics
- Hockey Academy
- Intramural Basketball
- Intramural Handball
- Lacrosse Team and Academy
- Mountain Biking Club
- Rugby
- Soccer Team and Academy
- Swim Team
- Volleyball Team and Academy
- Weight Lifting Club
- Wrestling Club

The Junior Varsity Islanders won the BC high school Football Subway bowl in 2016 against Harewood's John Barsby Bulldawgs.
