= 2024 Canadian Championship =

Canadian men's soccer tournament

Championnat canadien 2024 (French)

Tournament details
- Country: Canada
- Date: April 23 – September 25
- Teams: 14 (from 5 leagues)

Final positions
- Champions: Vancouver Whitecaps FC (4th title)
- Runners-up: Toronto FC

Tournament statistics
- Matches played: 19
- Goals scored: 53 (2.79 per match)
- Attendance: 112,917 (5,943 per match)
- Top goal scorer(s): Deandre Kerr (5 goals)

Awards
- George Gross Memorial Trophy: Isaac Boehmer
- Best young player: Isaac Boehmer

The 2024 Canadian Championship (French: Championnat canadien 2024) was the seventeenth edition of the Canadian Championship, the premier men's domestic cup competition in Canadian soccer, and the 23rd competition staged to determine the winner of the Voyageurs Cup. It featured all eleven professional men's soccer teams in Canada, from Major League Soccer and the Canadian Premier League, along with the champions of the three semi-professional League1 Canada competitions. This tournament marked the first Voyageurs Cup campaign for CS Saint-Laurent and Simcoe County Rovers FC. Victoria Highlanders FC had also qualified as the League1 British Columbia regular season winners but withdrew before the start of the tournament; they were replaced by TSS FC Rovers.

Vancouver Whitecaps FC earned their third consecutive title after defeating Toronto FC on penalties following a scoreless draw in the final, held at BC Place in Vancouver. As winners, they qualified for the 2025 CONCACAF Champions Cup.

== Format ==
Canada Soccer announced the competition format on February 22. The tournament consisted of four rounds with the quarter-finals and semi-finals being two legs, and the preliminary round and the finals being single legs. The winner of the 2023 Canadian Championship, Vancouver Whitecaps FC, and runner-up, CF Montréal, both received byes to the quarter-finals. The remaining twelve teams began the competition in the preliminary round starting in April. Hosting privileges up to the semi-finals were determined based on a three-year Canadian Championship ranking index.

An earlier report suggested that Canada Soccer was reviewing a Canadian Premier League format proposal that would include a May start date, byes for Vancouver Whitecaps FC (2023 Canadian Championship winners) and Forge FC (2023 Canadian Premier League champions), and replace the draw with set regional matchups.

== Teams ==
2024 Canadian Championship (Canada)
Montreal area clubs: CF Montréal; CS Saint-Laurent
Toronto area clubs: Toronto FC; York United FC
Vancouver area clubs: Vancouver Whitecaps FC; Vancouver FC; TSS FC Rovers

Canadian Premier League Major League Soccer League1 Canada

Rank	League	Team	Location	Entry round	App.	Previous best (last)
1	Major League Soccer	Vancouver Whitecaps FC	Vancouver, BC	Quarter-finals	16th	Winners (2023)
2	Major League Soccer	CF Montréal	Montreal, Quebec	Quarter-finals	16th	Winners (2021)
3	Major League Soccer	Toronto FC	Toronto, Ontario	Preliminary round	17th	Winners (2020)
4	Canadian Premier League	Pacific FC	Langford, BC	Preliminary round	5th	Semi-finals (2023)
5	Canadian Premier League	Forge FC	Hamilton, Ontario	Preliminary round	6th	Runners-up (2020)
6	Canadian Premier League	York United FC	Toronto, Ontario	Preliminary round	5th	Semi-finals (2022)
7	Canadian Premier League	Cavalry FC	Foothills County, Alberta	Preliminary round	5th	Semi-finals (2019)
8	Canadian Premier League	HFX Wanderers FC	Halifax, Nova Scotia	Preliminary round	5th	Quarter-finals (2022)
9	Canadian Premier League	Atlético Ottawa	Ottawa, Ontario	Preliminary round	4th	Quarter-finals (2023)
10	Canadian Premier League	Valour FC	Winnipeg, Manitoba	Preliminary round	5th	Quarter-finals (2021)
11	Canadian Premier League	Vancouver FC	Langley, BC	Preliminary round	2nd	Preliminary round (2023)
12	League1 Canada (division champions)	TSS FC Rovers (Note: Victoria Highlanders FC had qualified for the Canadian Championship as the League1 BC regular season winners. However, on April 8, 2024, the club announced that it had withdrawn from the competition. On April 19, 2024, they were replaced by TSS FC Rovers.) (L1BC)	Burnaby, BC	Preliminary round	2nd	Quarter-finals (2023)
13	League1 Canada (division champions)	CS Saint-Laurent (L1Q)	Montreal, Quebec	Preliminary round	1st	—
14	League1 Canada (division champions)	Simcoe County Rovers FC (L1O)	Barrie, Ontario	Preliminary round	1st	—

=== Ranking Index ===
Ahead of this edition of the competition, Canada Soccer created the Canadian Championship Club Ranking Index. The index used a weighted ranking of the past three years' competitive results in the Canadian Championship. Each professional team received its own ranking while League1 Canada's component leagues each received a league ranking that was used by their representative team. In the preliminary round, the team with the highest ranking hosted the single knockout game; in the quarter and semi-final rounds, the team with the highest ranking hosted the second game of the two-legged tie.

== Schedule ==
The preliminary round schedule was announced on March 11; the quarter-final schedule was announced on May 3; and the semi-final schedule was announced on June 10.

Round	Draw date	First leg	Second leg
Preliminary round	February 23	April 23 – May 2	
Quarter-finals	February 23	May 7–8	May 21–29
Semi-finals	May 29	July 10	August 27
Final	May 29	September 25	

== Draw ==
Canada Soccer conducted two draws to determine the matchups of the tournament: one draw to determine the preliminary round and quarter-final matchups, and another to determine the semi-final and final rounds.

=== First draw ===
The first draw was held on February 23, 2024 and was conducted behind closed doors. Canada Soccer placed each participating team in the following pots. Prior to the main draw, one team from the east pot was randomly drawn to play in the west bracket. They were automatically scheduled to host Valour FC in the preliminary round due to geographical considerations.

West	West (non-hosting)	East	East (semi-pro)	Bye
Cavalry FC; Pacific FC; Vancouver FC	Valour FC; Victoria Highlanders FC (Note: Victoria Highlanders FC withdrew from the competition on April 8, 2024, after the first draw had been completed. They were replaced by TSS FC Rovers.)	Atlético Ottawa (Note: Moved to West Pot.); Forge FC; HFX Wanderers FC; Toronto FC; York United FC	Simcoe County Rovers FC; CS Saint-Laurent	CF Montréal; Vancouver Whitecaps FC

=== Second draw ===
The second draw was held on May 29 during halftime of the Pacific FC vs Atlético Ottawa quarter-final second-leg match. It determined the matchups for the semi-finals and hosting rights for the single-leg final.

== Bracket ==
Preliminary round single match
Foothills County, AB
CPL	Cavalry FC	1
CPL	Vancouver FC	0
Langford, BC
CPL	Pacific FC (p)	1 (5)
L1BC	TSS FC Rovers	1 (4)
Ottawa, ON
CPL	Atlético Ottawa	7
CPL	Valour FC	0
Toronto (BMO), ON
MLS	Toronto FC	5
L1O	Simcoe County Rovers FC	0
Halifax, NS
CPL	HFX Wanderers FC	2 (3)
L1Q	CS Saint-Laurent (p)	2 (5)
Hamilton, ON
CPL	Forge FC	3
CPL	York United FC	1

Quarter-finals two-legged tie
MLS	Vancouver Whitecaps FC (a)	2	0	2
CPL	Cavalry FC	1	1	2
CPL	Pacific FC	0	2	2
CPL	Atlético Ottawa	0	1	1
MLS	Toronto FC	3	8	11
L1Q	CS Saint-Laurent	0	1	1
MLS	CF Montréal	1	1	2
CPL	Forge FC	1	2	3

Semi-finals two-legged tie
MLS	Vancouver Whitecaps FC	1	1	2
CPL	Pacific FC	0	0	0
MLS	Toronto FC (a)	1	1	2
CPL	Forge FC	2	0	2

Final single match
Vancouver, BC
MLS	Vancouver Whitecaps FC (p)	0 (4)
MLS	Toronto FC	0 (2)

== Preliminary round ==
=== Summary ===
Home team	Score	Away team
Cavalry FC	1–0	Vancouver FC
Atlético Ottawa	7–0	Valour FC
Pacific FC	1–1 (5–4 p)	TSS FC Rovers
Forge FC	3–1	York United FC
HFX Wanderers FC	2–2 (3–5 p)	CS Saint-Laurent
Toronto FC	5–0	Simcoe County Rovers FC

=== Matches ===
April 23
7:00 pm MDT

Cavalry FC	1–0	Vancouver FC
Warschewski 66'	Report

ATCO Field, Foothills County, Alberta
Attendance: 1,946
Referee: Pierre-Luc Lauzière

April 24
7:30 pm EDT

Toronto FC	5–0	Simcoe County Rovers FC
Owusu 18'; Mailula 30'; Long 33'; Osorio 39'; Spicer 76'	Report

BMO Field, Toronto, Ontario
Attendance: 11,430
Referee: Michael Venne

May 1
7:00 pm EDT

Atlético Ottawa	7–0	Valour FC
Bassett 14' (pen.), 64'; Zapater 30', 37'; Del Campo 31', 69'; Tabla 63'	Report

TD Place Stadium, Ottawa, Ontario
Attendance: 2,492
Referee: Scott Bowman

May 1
7:00 pm EDT

Forge FC	3–1	York United FC
Hamilton 8', 40'; Choinière 17'	Report	Martínez 87'

Tim Hortons Field, Hamilton, Ontario
Attendance: 2,471
Referee: Ben Hoskins

May 1
7:00 pm PDT

Pacific FC	1–1	TSS FC Rovers
Moore 90+8'	Report	Hennessy 75'
Penalties
Sellouf (penalty missed); Meilleur-Giguère (penalty missed); Yeates (penalty scored); Tîrcoveanu (penalty scored); Dada-Luke (penalty scored); Toussaint (penalty scored); Heard (penalty scored)	5–4	(penalty scored) Polisi; (penalty missed) Jones; (penalty missed) O'Hea; (penalty scored) Hennessy; (penalty scored) White; (penalty scored) Zohar; (penalty missed) Mejía

Starlight Stadium, Langford, British Columbia
Attendance: 2,161
Referee: Alain Ruch

May 2
7:00 pm ADT

HFX Wanderers FC	2–2	CS Saint-Laurent
Nimick 29' (pen.); Telfer 83'	Report	Kane 33' (pen.); Kwemi 65'
Penalties
Nimick (penalty scored); Callegari (penalty scored); Telfer (penalty scored); Volesky (penalty missed)	3–5	(penalty scored) Kwemi; (penalty scored) Mlah; (penalty scored) Boughanmi; (penalty scored) Sakande; (penalty scored) Kane

Wanderers Grounds, Halifax, Nova Scotia
Attendance: 4,588
Referee: Filip Dujic

== Quarter-finals ==
=== Summary ===
Team 1	Agg.	Team 2	1st leg	2nd leg
Cavalry FC	2–2 (a)	Vancouver Whitecaps FC	1–2	1–0
Atlético Ottawa	1–2	Pacific FC	0–0	1–2
Forge FC	3–2	CF Montréal	1–1	2–1
CS Saint-Laurent	1–11	Toronto FC	0–3	1–8

=== Matches ===
May 7
7:00 pm MDT

Cavalry FC	1–2	Vancouver Whitecaps FC
Shaw 90+3'	Report	Johnson 45+2', 80'

ATCO Field, Foothills County, Alberta
Attendance: 4,084
Referee: Ben Hoskins
May 21
7:30 pm PDT

Vancouver Whitecaps FC	0–1	Cavalry FC
	Report	Veselinović 32' (o.g.)

BC Place, Vancouver, British Columbia
Attendance: 11,863
Referee: Mathieu Souaré

2–2 on aggregate. Vancouver Whitecaps FC won on away goals.

May 8
7:00 pm EDT

Atlético Ottawa	0–0	Pacific FC
	Report

TD Place Stadium, Ottawa, Ontario
Attendance: 1,977
Referee: Marie-Soleil Beaudoin
May 29
7:00 pm PDT

Pacific FC	2–1	Atlético Ottawa
Sellouf 28' (pen.); Heard 34'	Report	Salter 60'

Starlight Stadium, Langford, British Columbia
Attendance: 2,810
Referee: Pierre-Luc Lauzière

Pacific FC won 2–1 on aggregate.

May 7
11:00 am EDT

Forge FC	1–1	CF Montréal
Choinière 31'	Report	Duke 52'

Tim Hortons Field, Hamilton, Ontario
Attendance: 14,923
Referee: Renzo Villanueva
May 22
7:30 pm EDT

CF Montréal	1–2	Forge FC
Wanyama 65'	Report	Parra 14'; Poku 24'

Saputo Stadium, Montreal, Quebec
Attendance: 7,582
Referee: Marie-Soleil Beaudoin

Forge FC won 3–2 on aggregate.

May 8
7:00 pm EDT

CS Saint-Laurent	0–3	Toronto FC
	Report	Longstaff 50'; Kerr 59'; Bernardeschi 76'

Complexe sportif Claude-Robillard, Montreal, Quebec
Attendance: 6,482
Referee: Michael Venne
May 21
7:00 pm EDT

Toronto FC	8–1	CS Saint-Laurent
Kerr 12', 14', 43', 72'; Mailula 50'; Etienne 56' (pen.); Goulet 62' (o.g.); Owusu 80'	Report	Aristilde 89'

BMO Field, Toronto, Ontario
Attendance: 9,148
Referee: Yusri Rudolf

Toronto FC won 11–1 on aggregate.

== Semi-finals ==
=== Summary ===
Team 1	Agg.	Team 2	1st leg	2nd leg
Pacific FC	0–2	Vancouver Whitecaps FC	0–1	0–1
Forge FC	2–2 (a)	Toronto FC	2–1	0–1

=== Matches ===
July 10
7:00 pm PDT

Pacific FC	0–1	Vancouver Whitecaps FC
	Report	Gauld 58'

Starlight Stadium, Langford, British Columbia
Attendance: 5,103
Referee: Renzo Villanueva
August 27
7:30 pm PDT

Vancouver Whitecaps FC	1–0	Pacific FC
Gauld 11'	Report

BC Place, Vancouver, British Columbia
Attendance: 10,966
Referee: Michael Venne

Vancouver Whitecaps FC won 2–0 on aggregate.

July 10
7:00 pm EDT

Forge FC	2–1	Toronto FC
Badibanga 11'; Poku 14'	Report	Owusu 88'

Tim Hortons Field, Hamilton, Ontario
Attendance: 11,341
Referee: Ben Hoskins
August 27
7:00 pm EDT

Toronto FC	1–0	Forge FC
Insigne 50'	Report

BMO Field, Toronto, Ontario
Attendance: 20,173
Referee: Renzo Villanueva

2–2 on aggregate. Toronto FC won on away goals.

== Final ==
September 25, 2024
7:00 pm PDT

Vancouver Whitecaps FC	0–0	Toronto FC
	Report
Penalties
Gauld (penalty scored); Armstrong (penalty missed); Berhalter (penalty scored); White (penalty scored); Utvik (penalty scored)	4–2	(penalty scored) Owusu; (penalty missed) Longstaff; (penalty missed) Thompson; (penalty scored) Osorio

BC Place, Vancouver, British Columbia
Attendance: 12,516
Referee: Marie-Soleil Beaudoin

== Top goalscorers ==
Team eliminated or did not play in this round.

Rank	Player	Team	Goals	By round					
Rank	Player	Team	Goals	PR	QF1	QF2	SF1	SF2	F
1	(Canada) Deandre Kerr	Toronto FC	5		1	4			
2	(Germany) Prince Owusu	Toronto FC	3	1		1	1		
3	(Northern Ireland) Ollie Bassett	Atlético Ottawa	2	2					
3	(Canada) David Choinière	Forge FC	2	1	1				
3	(Switzerland) Rubén del Campo	Atlético Ottawa	2	2					
3	(Scotland) Ryan Gauld	Vancouver Whitecaps FC	2				1	1	
3	(Canada) Jordan Hamilton	Forge FC	2	2					
3	(Canada) Levonte Johnson	Vancouver Whitecaps FC	2		2				
3	(South Africa) Cassius Mailula	Toronto FC	2	1		1			
3	(Canada) Kwasi Poku	Forge FC	2			1	1		
3	(Spain) Alberto Zapater	Atlético Ottawa	2	2					

=== Sending offs ===
No.	Date	Player	Team	Offence
1	April 23	(Canada) Shamit Shome	Cavalry FC	Serious foul play
2	May 21	(Tunisia) Oussema Boughanmi	CS Saint-Laurent	Serious foul play

== Broadcasting rights ==
OneSoccer, a Canadian video streaming service owned by Mediapro, had been the Canadian Championship's broadcaster in recent editions of the tournament. This status was put into doubt on January 25, 2024 when Canadian Soccer Business launched legal action against Mediapro, taking back the broadcast rights of several properties including the Canadian Championship. However, on April 2, OneSoccer began promoting a "2024 Season Pass" that included "exclusive access" to the Canadian Championship, suggesting a breakthrough had been reached. The following day, Canadian Soccer Business issued a statement saying that they and Mediapro were "on a positive path toward resolving our differences and expect to come to a finalized agreement in the near future".

Country	Broadcaster	Ref.
Canada	OneSoccer	
