= Unity FC (Canada) =

Semi-professional soccer club

- Full name: Unity Football Club
- Founded: 2021
- Stadium: Cloverdale Athletic Park
- Head Coach: Mike Shearon (men); Graham Roxburgh (women)
- League: British Columbia Premier League
- 2025: L1BC, 7th (men); L1BC, 3rd (women)
- Website: https://www.unityfc.ca/
Home colours

Unity Football Club is a Canadian semi-professional soccer club based in Surrey, British Columbia that plays in the British Columbia Premier League.

== History ==
The club was officially unveiled on November 22, 2021, as an inaugural license holder for the first season of the new semi-professional League1 British Columbia in 2022, operating in Langley, British Columbia. The team was formed in partnership with Trinity Western University and their Spartans sports teams with the head coaches of both the TWU men's and women's soccer teams being involved with the club.

Their inaugural matches occurred on May 22 on the road against TSS FC Rovers for both the male and female teams. The women's team recorded the club's first ever victory, defeating the Rovers 2-1.

In 2023, they formed an affiliation with Canadian Premier League club Vancouver FC, which enables Vancouver to send players to Unity on short-term loans throughout the season. In 2023, the club hosted their home season opening male and female match in nearby Chilliwack, British Columbia, before playing the remainder of the season at their home in Langley. That season, the women advanced to the women's championship final, where they were defeated by Whitecaps FC Girls Elite, and also qualified for the League1 Canada Inter-Provincial Championship. In 2023, they announced an ownership change, with an investor group led by TSN sportscaster Kelcey Brade taking over a majority share of the club.

In February 2024, it was announced that the club would move to Surrey, British Columbia and formed a partnership with youth club Surrey United SC.

In 2026, Unity held a number of home games at Bear Creek Park in the Newton area.

== Kits ==
=== Kit history ===
Home and away kits.

- Home

2022–23	2024–

- Away

2022–23	2024–

== Seasons ==
=== Men ===
Season	League	Teams	Record	Rank	Playoffs	Juan de Fuca Plate	Ref
2022	League1 British Columbia	7	3–3–6	6th	did not qualify	4th (Note: The Juan de Fuca Plate is a combined men's and women's competition that combines both squads results)	
2023	League1 British Columbia	8	5–5–4	4th	Semi-finals	5th	
2024	League1 British Columbia	7	4–4–4	5th	did not qualify	3rd	
2025	League1 British Columbia	9	3–7–6	7th	–	5th	
2026	British Columbia Premier League	8	2-10-2	8th	-	5th	

=== Women ===
Season	League	Teams	Record	Rank	Playoffs	Inter-provincial Championship	Juan de Fuca Plate	Ref
2022	League1 British Columbia	7	8–0–4	3rd	did not qualify	did not qualify	4th (Note: The Juan de Fuca Plate is a combined men's and women's competition that combines both squads results)	
2023	League1 British Columbia	8	7–3–4	3rd	Finalists	3rd	5th	
2024	League1 British Columbia	7	7–2–3	2nd	Semi-finals	did not qualify	3rd	
2025	League1 British Columbia	9	9–4–3	3rd	–	did not qualify	5th	
2026	British Columbia Premier League	8	6-7-1	5th	-	did not qualify	5th	

== Notable former players ==
The following players have either played at the professional or international level, either before or after playing for the League1 British Columbia team:

Men

- (Canada) James Cameron
- (Canada) Lennon Thompson
- (Grenada) Keishean Francois

Women

- (Canada) Kathryn Harvey
- (Canada) Tilly James
- (Canada) Jenaya Robertson
