= British Columbia Premier League =

Canadian soccer league

- Organising body: BC Soccer Association
- Founded: October 5, 2021; 5 years ago
- First season: 2022
- Country: Canada
- Confederation: CONCACAF
- Number of clubs: 8 (men's); 8 (women's)
- Level on pyramid: 3
- Domestic cup(s): Canadian Championship (men); Interprovincial Championship (women)
- Current champions: Langley United (men); Altitude FC (women) (2025)
- Current Juan de Fuca Plate: Altitude FC (2025)
- Most championships: TSS Rovers FC (2, men), Vancouver Whitecaps Girls Elite (3, women)
- Most Juan de Fuca Plates: Whitecaps FC Academy (3)
- Broadcaster(s): Telus TV
- Website: bcplsoccer.ca
- Current: 2026 BCPL season

The British Columbia Premier League (BCPL, formerly League1 British Columbia (L1BC)) is a semi-professional men's and women's soccer league in British Columbia, Canada. The league is sanctioned by the Canadian Soccer Association and the BC Soccer Association as a pro-am league in the Canadian soccer league system.

In the Canadian soccer league system, the men's division is behind the Canadian Premier League (CPL). It is part of Premier Soccer Leagues Canada, the national third tier with regional divisions, with equivalent leagues in Quebec, Ontario, Alberta, and the Prairies. The men's league champion qualifies for the Canadian Championship, the domestic cup championship, for the following season.

The semi-professional league was created to fill in the gap between the top amateur leagues in the province, such as the Pacific Coast Soccer League, Fraser Valley Soccer League, Vancouver Island Soccer League and Vancouver Metro Soccer League, with the professional top tier Canadian Premier League.

== History ==
BC Soccer originally looked into the possibility of starting a "Regional Tier 3" league in their 2016 Strategic Plan, with the goal of beginning in 2018 with eight teams. However, nothing came to fruition due to insufficient interest from clubs. In June 2019, they announced their intention to begin play in 2021 with at least six clubs. Teams would need to commit for three years minimum and field teams in both the male and female divisions. The proposed league would be open to professional clubs fielding reserve sides, provided they are not branded with "Reserves" or "U-23" in their team name.

In January 2021, the league was rumoured to be launching later that year with six or eight teams, including a development team from the Major League Soccer club Vancouver Whitecaps FC. On October 5, 2021, the league was officially announced by BC Soccer to begin play in May 2022. The inaugural league began on May 22, with the Championship Final occurring on August 1 (British Columbia Day), with seven clubs participating in the first season. It was announced that with the creation of the league, the Juan de Fuca Plate, which was previously awarded to the top BC-based Premier Development League team in head-to-head matches, would now be awarded to the League1 BC club that accrued the greatest number of points across both the men's and women's divisions in an aggregate table. In addition, a cedar trophy was created to be awarded to both the men's and women's division champions. In November 2022, it was confirmed that the league winner would qualify for the following season's Canadian Championship, the national cup tournament. For the 2023 season, the league announced its first expansion club (Harbourside FC) bringing the league up to eight clubs.

On December 1, 2023, Canadian Soccer Business acquired L1BC from BC Soccer. CSB have owned League1 Ontario since 2018 and now oversee the day-to-day operations of both leagues. For the 2024 season, another expansion club joined, however, two original clubs withdrew from the league, bringing the total back to seven. For 2025, two additional clubs joined, bringing the league to nine clubs.

In January 2026, the league re-branded as the British Columbia Premier League, in line with a move across all the leagues in Canada. In April 2026, they announced, in partnership with the Fraser Valley Soccer League, a new fall/winter division for BCPL license holders, they would operate a fall/winter division under the FVSL umbrella, although the BCPL will retain sole authority over the competition model, the establishment of match-day standards, and technical direction and club licensing criteria, to maintain alignment with the BCPL's high-performance standards from the spring/summer season which will continue.

== Competition format ==
The BCPL regular season lasts approximately four months, from early April to late July. Teams play each other team home and away for a total of 14 matches in 2026. The regular season champion and runner-up advance to a single match final where the winner is crowned finals champion.

== Seasons ==
=== 2022–2024: league championship decided by playoffs ===
Season	Teams	Men's division		Women's division		Juan de Fuca Plate
Season	Teams	League champions	Runner-up	League champions	Runner-up	Juan de Fuca Plate
2022	7	TSS Rovers FC	Varsity FC^{1}	Whitecaps FC Girls Elite	Varsity FC^{1}	Varsity FC
2023	8	Whitecaps FC Academy	Victoria Highlanders FC^{1}	Whitecaps FC Girls Elite^{1}	Unity FC	Whitecaps FC Academy
2024	7	TSS Rovers FC^{1}	Altitude FC	Whitecaps FC Girls Elite^{1}	Burnaby FC	Whitecaps FC Academy

^1 – First place in regular season

=== 2025–present: league championship decided by regular season ===
Season	Teams	League champions		Juan de Fuca Plate
Season	Teams	Men's division	Women's division	Juan de Fuca Plate
2025	9	Langley United	Altitude FC	Altitude FC
2026	8	Langley United	Vancouver Rise FC Academy	Whitecaps and Rise Academies

== Clubs ==
As of 2026 there are 8 teams are members of the league, of which six are based in Greater Vancouver, one on Vancouver Island, and one in the province's interior. All teams compete in both the men's and women's divisions of the league.

British Columbia British Columbia Premier League Metro Vancouver

Metro Vancouver British Columbia Premier League

=== British Columbia Premier League ===
The league has 8 teams participating in the 2026 season.

As of May 8, 2026

Team	City	Stadium	Capacity	Founded	Debut	Men's Coach	Women's Coach
Current teams
Altitude FC	North Vancouver	Kinsmen Park	700	2021	2022	Faly Basse	Jesse Symons
Burnaby FC	Burnaby	Burnaby Lake Sports Complex West	1000	2023	2024	Joe Zupo / Adriano Clemente	Adam Tobia
Langley United FC	Langley	Willoughby Community Park	1000	1926	2025	Azad Palani	Chelsey Hannesson
Kamloops United FC	Kamloops	Hillside Stadium	1060	2021	2022	Darren Sarll	Haley Bartram
Nanaimo United FC	Nanaimo	Q'unq'inuqwstuxw Stadium	1500	2022	2023	Kevin Lindo	Francisco Souza
TSS FC Rovers	Burnaby	Swangard Stadium	5,288	1997	2022	Brendan Teeling	Dalibor Plavsic
Unity FC	Surrey	Cloverdale Athletic Park	2000	2021	2022	Mike Shearon	Graham Roxburgh
Whitecaps FC Academy	Vancouver (UBC)	Thunderbird Stadium	3500	2007	2022	Ewan Fisher	Tina Cook

=== Former clubs ===
Former clubs
Team	City	Stadium	First season	Last season
Nautsa’mawt FC (Note: Nautsa’mawt FC was known as Varsity FC in 2022)	UBC Campus (Note: Based on the campus of the University of British Columbia. The campus is part of the unincorporated Metro Vancouver Electoral Area A and is located just west of the City of Vancouver proper.)	Thunderbird Stadium	2022	2023
Victoria Highlanders FC	Saanich	Centennial Stadium	2022	2023
Evolution FC	Coquitlam	Percy Perry Stadium	2025	

== L1BC clubs in other competitions ==
=== Men ===
Season	Club	Competition	Result	Record
2022	No competition held			
2023	TSS Rovers FC	Canadian Championship	Quarter-finals	1–0–1
2024	TSS Rovers FC (Note: Victoria Highlanders FC originally qualified but withdrew before the tournament began.)	Canadian Championship	Preliminary round	0–1–0
2025	TSS Rovers FC	Canadian Championship	Preliminary round	0–0–1
2026	Langley United	Canadian Championship	Preliminary round	0–0–1

=== Women ===
Season	Club	Competition	Result	Record
2022	Varsity FC	Interprovincial Championship	4th	0–1–1 (Note: The 1 draw was a penalty shoot-out loss.)
2023	Whitecaps FC Girls Elite	Blue Stars/FIFA Youth Cup	W	1–3–1 (Note: The 3 draws include 2 penalty shoot-out wins in the knockout stages.)
2023	Whitecaps FC Girls Elite	Inter-provincial Championship	W	2–0–0
2023	Unity FC	Inter-provincial Championship	3rd	1–0–1
2024	Whitecaps FC Girls Elite	Inter-provincial Championship	W	1–1–0 (Note: The 1 draw was a penalty shoot-out win.)
2025	Altitude FC	Inter-provincial Championship	4th	0–1-1

== See also ==
- Canadian soccer league system
- League1 Canada
