= TSS FC Rovers =

Canadian soccer team

- Short name: TSS Rovers
- Founded: 1997; 2017 (semi-pro team)
- Stadium: Swangard Stadium; Burnaby, British Columbia (Note: TSS as an organization are based in Richmond, but their British Columbia Premier League teams play their home matches in Burnaby.)
- Capacity: 5,288
- Coordinates: 49°13′51″N 123°01′16″W
- Coach: Brendan Teeling (men); Dalibor Plavsic (women)
- League: British Columbia Premier League
- 2026: BCPL, 2nd (men); BCPL, 4th (women)
- Website: http://www.tssfc.ca/adult
Home colours	Away colours

TSS FC Rovers, commonly referred to as TSS Rovers, are a Canadian soccer team based in Richmond, British Columbia, Canada that play in the British Columbia Premier League, part of the third tier of soccer in Canada. Established for the 2017 PDL season by general manager Will Cromack and head coach Colin Elmes, the Rovers are the under-23 team of the TSS Academy, one of the largest soccer schools in British Columbia's Lower Mainland.

== History ==
=== Founding ===
Club logo from 2017 to 2020

TSS (Total Soccer Systems) Academy was founded in 1997, based in Richmond, British Columbia.

=== PDL and WPSL era ===
In late 2016, TSS purchased the rights to the Premier Development League franchise of the Washington Crossfire, and in the spring of 2017 fielded their first squad. The club has a supporters group called the "Swanguardians," alluding to the Rovers' new home, Swangard Stadium, which was previously the home stadium of the Vancouver Whitecaps before the Caps joined the MLS. The team has a stated policy of fostering Canadian talent, or players eligible for the Canadian men's national teams, stating every player must be "either a Canadian citizen, permanent resident or refugee or immigrant with an intent to one day wear the Maple Leaf."

In 2018 the women's team was founded to play in the WPSL. Notable signings included Canada WNT players Jordyn Huitema and Julia Grosso. In 2018, the men's team signed its first non-Canadian, Dutchman Nick Soolsma, a former Toronto FC midfielder, as player-coach.

The club competed with the Victoria Highlanders for the Juan de Fuca Plate, awarded annually to the best PDL/USL League Two club in British Columbia. The Rovers won it in 2018 and 2019.

In 2020, the club updated their logo to include a sword fern, a plant indigenous to coastal BC.

=== British Columbia Premier League era ===
On November 1, 2021, it was announced that the club would be playing in the inaugural season of British Columbia Premier League (BCPL) (named League1 BC at the time). After finishing second in the league standings in their first season, the men's team went on to defeat Varsity FC on penalty kicks in the Championship Final, thereby qualifying for the national 2023 Canadian Championship.

TSS Rovers made their first appearance in the Canadian Championship on April 19, 2023, at Swangard Stadium, where they defeated Valour FC 3–1, becoming the first semi-pro team to knockout a professional team in Canadian Championship history. They were then defeated by another CPL club, Pacific FC, in the quarter-finals. TSS Rovers would finish the 2023 BCPL season in second place before falling to the eventual playoff winners, Whitecaps FC Academy, in the semi-finals.

On April 19, 2024, it was announced that TSS Rovers would participate in the 2024 Canadian Championship to replace Victoria Highlanders FC, who had withdrawn from the competition. They were drawn against Pacific FC for the preliminary round, where they drew 1–1 in normal time, with Pacific scoring a game-tying goal in the eighth minute of stoppage time, before being defeated 5–4 in penalty kicks. In 2024, the Rovers won the BCPL regular season title, which qualified them for the 2025 Canadian Championship. On August 4, 2024, TSS Rovers defeated Altitude FC 3–2 in the BCPL playoff championship, making them the first team in BCPL history to complete the league double.

At the 2025 Canadian Championship, TSS faced off against Valour FC in the preliminary round. The game ended in a 1-0 win for the CPL side. The 2025 BCPL season was tightly contested with TSS and Langley United leading the standings for much of the season. In the final match week, TSS would lose to Kamloops United FC after an 84th minute winner. After Langley won on the last match day, TSS saw themselves finishing in second place, one point behind of the league winners and narrowly missing out on the 2026 Canadian Championship.

== Club culture ==
=== Ownership ===
When TSS joined the inaugural season of British Columbia Premier League (BCPL) (named League1 BC at the time), it was decided the team would emulate professional German clubs that were partly owned by their fans, giving the fans voting rights and a say in the direction of the team. The projected aim for this initiative was that fans would own 49% of the team. As of May 2025, fans had purchased about 19% of the available shares. On April 29, 2026, it was announced that TSS Rovers had entered a strategic partnership with Vancouver Athletic FC, one of the largest youth soccer clubs in British Columbia. Through this partnership, Vancouver Athletic FC would receive a 30% ownership stake in the TSS Rovers.

=== Supporters ===
The team is supported by The Swanguardians, a small group of supporters who stand at the south end of the pitch and support the team with banners, smoke displays, and original chants made primarily from Canadian songs. The group was formed in 2017 shortly after the founding of the team, and continues to support its former players in their college, professional, and national team careers on social media through their #AlwaysARover hashtag.

=== Rivalries ===
TSS Rovers participates in the Ironworkers Derby which is contested against Altitude FC. The derby is so named due to the Ironworkers Memorial Bridge which connects the North Shore, where Altitude FC's home field is located, to the rest of Greater Vancouver. The two teams met in the 2024 British Columbia Premier League Playoff Championship, where TSS Rovers came out on top and completed the double.

The team also participates in the Burnaby Derby, since 2024 when Burnaby FC joined British Columbia Premier League. The inaugural matches of the derby were held on June 24, 2024, where the Burnaby FC women's side won their match, while the men's teams drew 0-0.

== Kits ==
=== Kit history ===
Home and away kits.

- Home

2017–21	2022–23	2024	2025–

- Away

2017–21	2022–24	2025–

== Year-by-year ==
=== Men ===
Year	Div	League	Record	Regular season	Playoffs (Note: Beginning in 2025, British Columbia Premier League competition will not hold a playoff competition.)	Juan de Fuca Plate (Note: The Juan de Fuca Plate became a combined men's and women's competition beginning in 2022.)	Canadian Championship	Top scorer	Ref
2017	4	USL League Two (Note: The USL League Two was known as "Premier Development League" until 2018.)	3–3–8	6th, Northwest	Did not qualify	Runner-up	Not eligible	Daniel Davidson (5)	
2018	4	USL League Two	5–2–7	4th, Northwest	Did not qualify	Winner	Not eligible	Zach Verhoven (5)	
2019	4	USL League Two	3–2–9	6th, Northwest	Did not qualify	Winner	Not eligible	Matteo Polisi (6)	
2020	4	USL League Two	Season cancelled due to COVID-19 pandemic						
2021	4	USL League Two	Did not enter due to COVID-19 pandemic travel restrictions						
2022	3	British Columbia Premier League (Note: The British Columbia Premier League was known as "League1 British Columbia" until 2026.)	6–4–2	2nd	Champions	2nd	Not eligible	Erik Edwardson (10)	
2023	3	British Columbia Premier League	9–2–3	2nd	Semi-finals	2nd	Quarter-finals	Massud Habibullah (8)	
2024	3	British Columbia Premier League	7–3–2	1st	Champions	2nd	Preliminary round	Massud Habibullah (7)	
2025	3	British Columbia Premier League	10–2–4	2nd	–	4th	Preliminary round	Ivan Mejia (14)	
2026	3	British Columbia Premier League	10–2–2	2nd	–	3rd	Did not qualify	Massud Habibullah (11)	

=== Women ===
Year	League	Record	Regular season	Playoffs (Note: Beginning in 2025, British Columbia Premier League competition will not hold a playoff competition.)	Juan de Fuca Plate (Note: The Juan de Fuca Plate was a combined men's and women's competition beginning in 2022.)	Interprovincial Championship	Top scorer	Ref
2018	Women's Premier Soccer League	3–2–2	4th, Northwest	–	–	N/A	Jenna Baxter (5)	
2019	Women's Premier Soccer League	4–0–4	5th, Northwest	–	–	N/A		
2020	Season cancelled due to COVID-19 pandemic							
2021	Did not enter due to COVID-19 pandemic travel restrictions							
2022	British Columbia Premier League	6–3–3	4th	Did not qualify	2nd	Did not qualify	Claire Ye (5)	
2023	British Columbia Premier League	6–3–5	4th	Semi-finals	2nd	Did not qualify	Delana Friesen (7)	
2024	British Columbia Premier League	5–2–5	4th	Semi-finals	2nd	Did not qualify	Jenna Baxter (5)	
2025	British Columbia Premier League	7-4-5	4th	–	4th	Did not qualify	Sofia Faremo (6)	
2026	British Columbia Premier League	6-5-3	4th	–	3rd	Did not qualify	Sofia Faremo (3)	

== Notable former players ==
The following players have played at the professional or senior international level either before or after playing for the PDL/WPSL/L1BC team.

Men

- (Canada) Mamadi Camara
- (Canada) Henry Cromack
- (El Salvador) (Canada) Gabriel Escobar
- (Canada) Thomas Gardner
- (Canada) Jordan Haynes
- (Canada) Albert Kang
- (United States) Sacko Konate
- (Canada) Patrick Metcalfe
- (Colombia) Ivan Mejia
- (Canada) Devin O'Hea
- (Canada) Niko Papakyriakopolous
- (Canada) Justin Pena
- (Canada) Marcello Polisi
- (Canada) Matteo Polisi
- (Canada) Gurman Sangha
- (Japan) Fugo Segawa
- (Netherlands) Nick Soolsma
- (Canada) Desmond Tachie
- (Canada) Zach Verhoven
- (Canada) Joel Waterman
- (Canada) Anthony White
- (Canada) Lowell Wright
- (Finland) (Canada) Kristian Yli-Hietanen

Women

- (Ukraine) Tanya Boychuk
- (Canada) Ashley Cathro
- (Canada) Natalie Cooke
- (Canada) Stella Downing
- (Canada) Delana Friesen
- (Canada) Julia Grosso
- (Canada) Kaela Hansen
- (Canada) Jordyn Huitema
- (Canada) Tilly James
- (Canada) Mia Pante
- (Canada) Emma Regan
- (Canada) (United States) Aislin Streicek
- (Canada) Kirstin Tynan
- (Canada) Erin van Dolder

== Honours ==
=== Men ===
Major

- British Columbia Premier League Championship

Champions (1): 2022, 2024

- British Columbia Premier League Regular Season Winners

Champions (1): 2024

Minor

- Juan de Fuca Plate

Winners (2): 2018, 2019
Runners-up (1): 2017

=== Combined ===
- Juan de Fuca Plate

Runners-up (1): 2022, 2023, 2024
