= Kamloops United FC =

Semi-professional football club

- Full name: Kamloops United Football Club
- Founded: November 5, 2021; 4 years ago (as Rivers FC)
- Stadium: Hillside Stadium; Kamloops, British Columbia
- Capacity: 1,060
- Head coach: John Antulov (men); Haley Bartram (women)
- League: British Columbia Premier League
- 2025: L1BC, 5th (men); L1BC, 9th (women)
- Website: https://league1.kufc.ca/
Home colours	Away colours

Kamloops United Football Club is a Canadian semi-professional soccer club based in Kamloops, British Columbia that competes in the British Columbia Premier League. The club was originally founded under the name Rivers FC.

== History ==
=== Rivers FC ===
The club's badge from 2022 until 2024

Rivers FC was officially unveiled on November 5, 2021, as an inaugural license holder for the first season of the new semi-professional League1 British Columbia in 2022. The Rivers FC name was derived from the North Thompson River and South Thompson River which converge in Kamloops. The club will field teams in both the male and female divisions, and the team is affiliated with Thompson Rivers University, announcing that the head coaches of the men's and women's Thompson Rivers WolfPack teams will serve as the head coaches for the Rivers male and female teams. The team is expected to serve as a good recruiting tool for the university, as well as to keep the school's players playing in the offseason. The club is expected to use both the TRU's Hillside Stadium and McArthur Island Park as its home field. In December, they announced a relationship with youth club Thompson Okanagan FC to develop their player pathway. They also announced the formation of a reserve team, called Rivers FC II, that will play in the Pacific Coast Soccer League.

Their inaugural matches occurred on May 22, at home, against Altitude FC for both the men and women. In their debut matches, the men's team drew 1-1, while the women won their match 2-0, with a combined attendance of over 700 watching both matches. In their inaugural season, the men finished in fifth, while the women finished in seventh.

=== Kamloops United FC ===
In 2024, Rivers FC and the Kamloops Youth SA announced a merger and joint rebrand under one banner as Kamloops United FC. In a move to make the game more accessible, they announced that admission to all of their home games in 2025 would be free of charge.

== Personnel ==
Name	Position
(Canada) Lyle Dos Santos	General manager
(Canada) John Antulov	Men's Head Coach
(England) Haley Bartram	Women's Head Coach
(Germany) Jens Heck	Men's Assistant Coach
(Canada) Kevin Brechin	Athletic Therapist
(Canada) Luis Adamo	Men's Goalkeeper Coach
(Canada) Haley Bartram	Women's Assistant Coach

== Seasons ==
=== Men ===
Season	League	Teams	Record	Rank	Playoffs	Juan de Fuca Plate	Ref
2022	League1 British Columbia	7	3–4–5	5th	did not qualify	4th (Note: The Juan de Fuca Plate is a combined men's and women's competition that combines both squads results)	
2023	League1 British Columbia	8	4–4–6	6th	did not qualify	8th	
2024	League1 British Columbia	7	4–1–7	6th	did not qualify	7th	
2025	League1 British Columbia	9	7–2–7	5th	–	8th	

=== Women ===
Season	League	Teams	Record	Rank	Playoffs	Juan de Fuca Plate	Ref
2022	League1 British Columbia	7	1–1–10	7th	did not qualify	4th (Note: The Juan de Fuca Plate is a combined men's and women's competition that combines both squads results)	
2023	League1 British Columbia	8	1–0–13	8th	did not qualify	8th	
2024	League1 British Columbia	7	1–4–7	7th	did not qualify	7th	
2025	League1 British Columbia	9	1–3–12	9th	–	8th	

== Notable players ==
The following players have either played at the professional or international level, either before or after playing for the League1 BC team:

=== Men ===
- (Canada) (Ukraine) Svyatik Artemenko
- (Canada) José Hernández
- (Montserrat) Lucas Kirnon
- (Somalia) Abd-El-Aziz Yousef

=== Women ===
- (Albania) Esi Lufo
- (Panama) Yvamara Rodríguez
