= Langley United =

Semi-professional soccer club

- Full name: Langley United Soccer Association
- Stadium: Willoughby Community Park
- Head coach: Azad Palani (men); Chelsey Hannesson (women)
- League: British Columbia Premier League
- 2025: L1BC, 1st (men); L1BC, 5th (women)
Home colours	Away colours

Langley United Soccer Association is a Canadian semi-professional soccer club based in Langley, British Columbia that plays in the British Columbia Premier League.

== History ==
Langley United was founded as a youth soccer club in 1926. In February 2020, the club was awarded a National Youth License by the Canadian Soccer Association. The club plays its home games at Willoughby Community Park, which it shares with Canadian Premier League club Vancouver FC.

In July 2024, it was announced that Langley United would form an expansion franchise to play in the men's and women's divisions of League1 British Columbia for the 2025 season (later re-branded as the British Columbia Premier League). They announced Brody Thomas as the team's first ever signing. They announced a strategic partnership with Vancouver FC for the 2025 season. In their first season, the men's team won the league title, clinching it with a victory in the final matchday of the season from a stoppage-time penalty kick, and earning qualification for the 2026 Canadian Championship.

== Seasons ==
=== Men ===
Season	League	Teams	Record	Rank	Playoffs	Juan de Fuca Plate	Canadian Championship	Ref
2025	League1 British Columbia	9	10–3–3	Champions	–	4th (Note: The Juan de Fuca Plate is a combined men's and women's competition that combines both squads results)	not eligible	

=== Women ===
Season	League	Teams	Record	Rank	Playoffs	Juan de Fuca Plate	Ref
2025	League1 British Columbia	9	5–3–8	5th	–	4th (Note: The Juan de Fuca Plate is a combined men's and women's competition that combines both squads results)	

== Notable players ==
The following players have either played at the professional or international level, either before or after playing for the League1 BC team:

- (Mexico) José Navarro
- (Canada) Lennon Thompson
- (Canada) Lowell Wright
- (France) Lys Mousset
