= Canada Soccer National Development Centres =

Canadian soccer development program

Canada Soccer National Development Centre
- League: Ontario Premier League; British Columbia Premier League; LS Pro (Quebec); Alberta Premier League; Prairies Premier League

The Canada Soccer National Development Centre and Canada Soccer EXCEL programs are full-time women's soccer development programs run by the Canadian Soccer Association in partnership with the various provincial associations to develop Canadian women's soccer players as part of the Canadian women's soccer pathway. There are National Development Centres in Ontario, Quebec, and British Columbia and Regional EXCEL programs in Alberta, Saskatchewan, Manitoba, New Brunswick and Nova Scotia.

The National Development Centres and Saskatchewan EXCEL enter teams in the five regions of Canada's tier 3 Premier Soccer Leagues Canada leagues: Alberta Premier League, British Columbia Premier League, Ontario Premier League, Prairies Premier League, and LS Pro (Québec).

== Alberta ==
Calgary Wild FC U23
- Full name: Alberta Soccer Association High Performance
- Founded: 2024
- Head coach: Kennedi Kiarash
- League: Alberta Premier League
- 2024: L1AB, 3rd

Calgary Wild FC U23 (formerly ASA High Performance) is a Canadian soccer team that plays in the Alberta Premier League.

In November 2023, it was announced that Canada Soccer and the Alberta Soccer Association would open a national development centre for U15 to U18 girls in Calgary in 2024. The program was developed in partnership with Calgary Foothills WFC, who developed the girls high performance program for it. The program would form part of the Alberta pathway to the Northern Super League which is to launch in 2025. The group will participate in the women's division of League1 Alberta. They finished tied for second place in their inaugural season, but finishing third due to goal difference. The team was initially known as ASA High Performance

In September 2024, it was announced that Alberta Soccer would transfer the operation of the program to new women's professional side Calgary Wild FC of the Northern Super League. In addition, they re-branded as Calgary Wild FC U21 (later U23).

=== Seasons ===
Season	League	Teams	Record	Rank	Playoffs	Inter-Provincial Championship	Ref
2024	League1 Alberta	7	6–0–6	3rd	not held	did not qualify	
2025	League1 Alberta	9	Exhibition only				
2026	Alberta Premier League	8					

== British Columbia ==
Vancouver Rise FC Academy
- Full name: Vancouver Whitecaps FC Girls Elite Academy
- Stadium: Ken Woods Field; Vancouver, British Columbia
- Head coach: Sam Gevaux
- League: British Columbia Premier League
- 2026: BCPL, 1st

Vancouver Rise FC Academy (formerly Whitecaps FC Girls Elite Academy) is a Canadian soccer team that plays in the British Columbia Premier League. In 2015, the Canadian Soccer Association partnered with the BC Soccer Association and the Vancouver Whitecaps FC to launch its regional EXCEL program which will be run as part of the Whitecaps FC Academy.

In 2021, it was announced that the program would join the semi-professional League1 British Columbia as a founding franchise for the 2022 season. Their home games will take place at Ken Woods Field at the National Soccer Development Centre. They played their debut match on May 22, defeating the Victoria Highlanders 5–1.

During the 2022 regular season, the Whitecaps managed to finish second in the regular season standings and qualified for the Championship final, despite many of their university age players having to depart the team before the end of the season, leaving them with a roster composed of 14–17 year old players. In the Championship Final, the Whitecaps Girls defeated Varsity FC to win the inaugural women's League1 British Columbia title. In May 2023, the team participated in the 2023 Blue Stars/FIFA Youth Cup, winning the title. In the 2023 L1BC season, they won the league double, capturing the regular season title and the playoff championship, advancing to the Women's Inter-Provincial Championship, which they also won to become the overall League1 Canada champions. In 2024, they once again won the League1 BC title to advance to the Inter-Provincial Championship again, winning the overall League1 Canada title for the second consecutive year.

In February 2025, the team rebranded as Vancouver Rise FC Academy to reflect the name of the new Vancouver Rise FC women's professional team in the Northern Super League.

=== Seasons ===
Season	League	Teams	Record	Rank	Playoffs	Inter-Provincial Championship	Other		Ref
2022	League1 British Columbia	7	8–1–3	2nd	Champions	Withdrew	–		
2023	League1 British Columbia	8	11–1–2	1st	Champions	Champions	Blue Stars/FIFA Youth Cup	Champions	
2024	League1 British Columbia	7	10–2–0	1st	Champions	Champions	CONCACAF W Champions Cup	Group stage	
2025	League1 British Columbia	9	12–1–3	2nd	—N/a	Did not qualify	CONCACAF W Champions Cup	Group stage	
2026	British Columbia Premier League	8	13–0–1	1st	—N/a	TBD	TBD		

== Ontario ==
AFC Toronto Academy
- Full name: AFC Toronto Academy
- Stadium: Ontario Soccer Centre; Vaughan, Ontario
- Capacity: 2,000
- Head coach: Joey Lombardi
- League: Ontario Premier League
- 2026: OPL1, 2nd

AFC Toronto Academy, formerly NDC Ontario, is a Canadian soccer team that plays in the Ontario Premier League.

The Canadian Soccer Association partnered with the Ontario Soccer Association, Own the Podium, Sport Canada, the Canadian Sport Institute Ontario, and Bill Crothers Secondary School in Markham Ontario, to launch its Regional EXCEL (REX) program in January 2018. The REX Super Centres provide top youth female players with a centralized, daily training program to develop their skills for players from U14 to U18 as part of Canada Soccer's Long-Term Player Development (LTPD) program.

In 2022, it was announced that the NDC Ontario program would join and enter a team in the League1 Ontario women's division. Their debut match occurred on May 22, finishing in a 1–1 draw against the Woodbridge Strikers. After finishing in second place in the regular season standings, NDC were crowned champions after defeating Alliance United FC in the playoff final in their debut season. In their second season, they won the Ron Smale Cup after finishing in first in regular-season standings, but fell in the playoff championship final to Alliance United in extra time. In 2024, they again won the league title, advancing to the League1 Canada Women's Inter-Provincial Championship.

In 2026, NDC Ontario was succeeded by AFC Toronto Academy, part of the Northern Super League club of the same name.

=== Seasons ===
Season	League	Teams	Record	Rank	Playoffs	League Cup	Inter-Provincial Championship	Ref
2022	League1 Ontario	20	14–4–1	2nd	Champions	–	Withdrew	
2023	League1 Ontario	19	14–3–1	1st	Finalists	–	Did not qualify	
2024	League1 Ontario Premier	10	15–1–2	Champions	–	Round of 16	3rd	
2025	League1 Ontario Premier	10	13–2–3	3rd	–	Quarter-finals	Did not qualify	
2026	Ontario Premier League 1	10	12-2-4	2nd	–	Quarter-finals	Competition discontinued	

== Quebec ==
CF Montréal Academy (PEF Québec)
- Full name: Programme Excel Féminin de Soccer Québec
- Stadium: Centre Sportif Bois-de-Boulogne; Laval, Québec
- League: Ligue1 Québec
- 2025: L1Q, 1st; Playoffs, SF

CF Montréal Academy (formerly known as PEF Québec) is a Canadian soccer team that plays in Ligue1 Québec.

In 2021, the Canadian Soccer Association in partnership with Soccer Québec set up the Programme EXCEL féminin in Quebec.

In 2022, it was announced that they would field a team in the Première ligue de soccer du Québec women's division beginning in the 2022 season. In May 2023, the CF Montréal Academy took over the technical component of the PEF program, as part of the launch of their women's academy program, with the PEF teams to now wear the CF Montreal badge on their jerseys. In 2023, they won the league and cup double and qualified for the League1 Canada Inter-Provincial Cup.

=== Seasons ===
Season	League	Teams	Record	Rank	Playoffs	League Cup	Inter-Provincial Championship	Ref
2022	Première ligue de soccer du Québec	12	4–2–5	7th	–	did not qualify	did not qualify	
2023	Ligue1 Québec	12	8–2–1	Champions	–	Champions	Runner-up	
2024	Ligue1 Québec	12	10–1–5	1st, Group B (2nd overall)	Finalists	–	did not qualify	
2025	Ligue1 Québec	10	9–2–2	1st, Group B (1st overall)	Semi-finals	–	did not qualify	
2026	Ligue1 Québec	12				–		

== Saskatchewan ==
Saskatchewan EXCEL
- Founded: 2025
- Stadium: Saskatoon Minor Football Field; Saskatoon, Saskatchewan
- Capacity: 5,000
- Owner: Saskatchewan Soccer Association
- Head coach: Matthew Hnatiw
- League: Prairies Premier League

Saskatchewan EXCEL is a Canadian soccer team that plays in the Prairies Premier League. Unlike the other programs run by the Canadian Soccer Association, Saskatchewan EXCEL consists of a women's team as well as a men's team.

=== Seasons ===
Men's

Season	League	Teams	Record	Rank	Playoffs	Canadian Championship	Ref
2026	Prairies Premier League	6	4–3–3	4th	Not held	Ineligible	

Women's

Season	League	Teams	Record	Rank	Playoffs	W Canadian Championship	Ref
2026	Prairies Premier League	6	4–0–6	4th	Not held	Did not qualify	
