= 2026 Vancouver Rise FC season =

Canadian soccer club's season of play

Vancouver Rise FC
2026 season
- Owner: Greg Kerfoot (majority); Christine Sinclair
- President: Aditi Bhatt (interim)
- Head coach: Anja Heiner-Møller
- Stadium: Swangard Stadium; Burnaby, British Columbia
- Highest home attendance: 4,650 vs. AFC Toronto (Apr 24)
- Lowest home attendance: 2,674 vs. Halifax Tides (Aug 15)
- Average home league attendance: 3,756
- Biggest win: Ottawa Rapid 1–5 Vancouver Rise (Aug 22); Vancouver Rise 4–0 Ottawa Rapid (Sep 13)
- Biggest defeat: Montreal Roses 4–0 Vancouver Rise (May 2); Ottawa Rapid 4–0 Vancouver Rise (May 6); Montreal Roses 5–1 Vancouver Rise (July 4)
Home colours	Away colours

The 2026 Vancouver Rise FC season is the second season in the club's history, playing in the Northern Super League (NSL), the top tier of women's soccer in Canada.

== Background ==
Vancouver Rise FC enters the season as the league's inaugural champions after defeating AFC Toronto 1–2 in the 2025 NSL Final.

In September 2026, Vancouver Rise parted ways with Anja Heiner-Møller.

== Team ==
=== Coaching staff ===
As of September 13, 2026.

Position	Name
Head coach (interim)	Iain Darbyshire
Assistant coach	Katie Collar
Assistant coach	Iain Darbyshire
Assistant Coach; Goalkeeper coach	Erin McNulty

=== Roster ===
As of September 13, 2026.

No.	Nat.	Name	Date of birth (age)	Since	Previous club	Notes
Goalkeepers
13	(Canada)	Morgan McAslan	February 22, 2000 (aged 26)	2025	(Canada) Whitecaps FC Girls Elite	
31	(Japan)	Jessica Wulf	May 20, 2005 (aged 20)	2025	(Japan) Nippon TV Tokyo Verdy Beleza	
Defenders
2	(Canada)	Shannon Woeller	January 31, 1990 (aged 36)	2025	(Sweden) Vittsjö GIK	
3	(Philippines)	Jessika Cowart	October 30, 1999 (aged 26)	2025	(Australia) Perth Glory	INT
4	(Canada)	Sura Yekka	January 4, 1997 (aged 29)	2026	(Sweden) Djurgårdens IF	
6	(Australia)	Tori Tumeth	March 4, 2001 (aged 25)	2026	(Australia) Sydney FC	
12	(Canada)	Jaylyn Wright	August 1, 2003 (aged 22)	2025	(United States) Fresno State Bulldogs	
15	(Canada)	Ariel Young	August 30, 2001 (aged 24)	2025	(Denmark) Fortuna Hjørring	
16	(Canada)	Kennedy Faulknor	June 30, 1999 (aged 26)	2025	(United States) Minnesota Aurora	
18	(Japan)	Yuka Okamoto	September 20, 1997 (aged 28)	2025	(Japan) AC Nagano Parceiro	INT
21	(Jamaica)	Chantelle Swaby	August 6, 1998 (aged 27)	2026	(England) Leicester City	INT
25	(Canada)	Kaela Hansen	April 13, 2000 (aged 26)	2026	(Canada) AFC Toronto	
33	(Canada)	Racquel Partovi	July 31, 2009 (aged 16)	2026	(Canada) Vancouver Rise Academy	YTH
34	(Canada)	Bridget Mutipula	August 5, 2008 (aged 17)	2025	(Canada) Vancouver Rise Academy	YTH
38	(Canada)	Chloe Taylor	September 2, 2008 (aged 17)	2025	(Canada) Vancouver Rise Academy	YTH
Midfielders
5	(Canada)	Quinn	August 11, 1995 (aged 30)	2025	(United States) Seattle Reign	DP
7	(United States)	Nikki Stanton	October 26, 1990 (aged 35)	2025	(United States) Seattle Reign	INT
10	(Colombia)	Camila Reyes	May 11, 2002 (aged 23)	2026	(Colombia) Santa Fe	INT
14	(Canada)	Anna Bout	April 23, 2001 (aged 25)	2025	(Denmark) Odense Boldklub Q	
24	(Wales)	Josie Longhurst	February 24, 2002 (aged 24)	2025	(Canada) Whitecaps FC Girls Elite	INT
26	(Algeria)	Anaïs Oularbi	March 24, 2003 (aged 23)	2025	(Canada) CS Mont-Royal Outremont	
46	(Canada)	Adalyn Fairweather	–	2026	(Canada) Vancouver Rise Academy	YTH
Forwards
8	(Canada)	Alex Lamontagne	July 27, 1996 (aged 29)	2026	(France) Saint-Étienne	
11	(Canada)	Jessica De Filippo	April 20, 2001 (aged 25)	2025	(Canada) Whitecaps FC Girls Elite	
17	(Canada)	Audrey François	January 1, 2004 (aged 22)	2026	(United States) Harvard Crimson	
22	(Canada)	Mia Pante	March 25, 2003 (aged 23)	2026	(Italy) AS Roma	Loan
23	(Colombia)	Maithé López	January 24, 2007 (aged 19)	2026	(United States) Angel City	Loan, INT
28	(Canada)	Jaime Perrault	August 8, 2006 (aged 19)	2025	(Denmark) FC Nordsjælland	
38	(Canada)	Lacey Kindel	September 27, 2009 (aged 16)	2026	(Canada) Vancouver Rise Academy	YTH
45	(Canada)	Myla Ewasiuk	July 27, 2009 (aged 16)	2026	(Canada) Vancouver Rise Academy	YTH
59	(Canada)	Allie Pazarka	December 24, 2009 (aged 16)	2026	(Canada) Vancouver Rise Academy	YTH
99	(Canada)	Latifah Abdu	October 18, 2001 (aged 24)	2025	(Canada) Montreal Roses	

== Competitions ==
=== Overview ===
Competition	Starting round	Record							
Competition	Starting round	Pld	W	D	L	GF	GA	GD	Win %
Norther Super League	Matchday 1	21	8	3	10	40	44	−4	38.10
W Canadian Championship	Quarter-finals	1	0	0	1	1	2	−1	0.00
Total		22	8	3	11	41	46	−5	36.36

Last updated: September 19, 2026
Source: Competitions

=== Northern Super League ===
==== Table ====
Pos	Team	Pld	W	D	L	GF	GA	GD	Pts	Playoff qualification
1	Montreal Roses (S)	25	12	9	4	43	27	+16	45	Advance to playoffs
2	Ottawa Rapid	25	12	4	9	49	44	+5	40	Advance to playoffs
3	AFC Toronto	25	10	9	6	38	24	+14	39	Advance to playoffs
4	Vancouver Rise	25	9	4	12	47	55	−8	31	Advance to playoffs
5	Halifax Tides	25	7	8	10	24	24	0	29	
6	Calgary Wild	25	5	6	14	28	55	−27	21	

Source: NSL
Rules for classification: 1) Points 2) Head-to-head points; 3) Head-to-head goal difference; 4) Goal difference; 5) Wins; 6) Goals scored; 7) Goals conceded; 8) Least red cards; 9) Least yellow cards; 10) Drawing of lots.
(S) Supporters' Shield winner

==== Results summary ====
Overall								Home						Away					
Pld	W	D	L	GF	GA	GD	Pts	W	D	L	GF	GA	GD	W	D	L	GF	GA	GD
21	8	3	10	40	44	−4	27	3	2	7	21	24	−3	5	1	3	19	20	−1

Last updated: September 19, 2026.
Source: NSL

==== Results by match ====
Match	1	2	3	4	5	6	7	8	9	10	11	12	13	14	15	16	17	18	19	20	21	22	23	24	25
Ground	H	A	A	A	H	A	H	A	H	A	A	A	H	H	H	H	A	H	H	H	H	A	A	A	H
Result	L	L	L	W	W	W	L	D	L	L	W	W	L	L	L	W	W	D	L	W	D				
Position (Note: Positions show the situation at the end of the week the match was played, or at the end of the gameday if more matches are played later in the week.)	4	6	6	5	4	3	4	4	5	5	5	3	5	5	5	5	4	4	5	4	4				

Updated to match(es) played on September 19, 2026. Source: #Matches
H = Home; N = Neutral; A = Away; W = Win; D = Draw; L = Loss; = Playoffs

==== Matches ====
===== April and May =====
April 24 1	Vancouver Rise	2–3	AFC Toronto	Burnaby, British Columbia
19:00 PT	Reyes 17', (yellow card) 45'; Abdu 40'; Stanton (yellow card) 63'; Wright (yellow card) 78'	Report	Burns 7'; Stratigakis 60', (yellow card) 64'; Okoronkwo 71'	Stadium: Swangard Stadium; Attendance: 4,650; Referee: Carly Shaw-MacLaren; Assistant referees: Gabrielle Lemieux; Allycia Carlucci

May 2 2	Montreal Roses	4–0	Vancouver Rise	Laval, Quebec
16:00 PT	Bennett 12'; Boychuk 44', 48'; Paquin 85'	Report	Reyes (yellow card) 29'	Stadium: CS Bois-de-Boulogne; Attendance: 3,304; Referee: Myriam Marcotte; Assistant referees: Marie-Han Gagnon; Félix Côté Leclerc

May 6 3	Ottawa Rapid	4–0	Vancouver Rise	Ottawa, Ontario
16:00 PT	Adamek 29'; Pridham 36', 42'; Waite 76'	Report		Stadium: TD Place Stadium; Attendance: 1,321; Referee: Carly Shaw-MacLaren; Assistant referees: Gabrielle Lemieux; Paulin-Junior Vanié

May 18 4	Halifax Tides	1–2	Vancouver Rise	Halifax, Nova Scotia
14:00 PT	Rhodes 57'	Report	Tumeth (yellow card) 16'; De Filippo 37', (yellow card) 60'; Quinn 59' (pen.)	Stadium: Wanderers Grounds; Attendance: 3,434; Referee: Isabelle Duclos; Assistant referees: Travis Lefebvre; Amanda Kwan

May 23 5	Vancouver Rise	2–1	AFC Toronto	Burnaby, British Columbia
13:00 PT	Abdu 11'; Quinn 33' (pen.); Filippo (yellow card) 41'	Report	Uddenberg 90+2'	Stadium: Swangard Stadium; Attendance: 3,526; Referee: Alain Ruch; Assistant referees: Stéphanie Fortin; Graham Forsyth

May 30 6	Montreal Roses	2–3	Vancouver Rise	Laval, Quebec
11:00 PT	Bennett 8'; Cappadona (yellow card) 35'; Paquin 81'	Report	Bout 16', (yellow card) 45+1'; Longhurst 71'; De Filippo 86'; Tumeth (yellow card) 90+1'	Stadium: CS Bois-de-Boulogne; Attendance: 2,457; Referee: Myriam Marcotte; Assistant referees: Stéphanie Fortin; Natalie Berry

===== June =====
June 14 7	Vancouver Rise	1–3	Ottawa Rapid	Burnaby, British Columbia
14:00 PT	De Filippo 43', (yellow card) 52'; Faulknor (red card) 72'	Report	Lee 28'; Pridham 50', 74' (pen.)	Stadium: Swangard Stadium; Attendance: 3,723; Referee: Mario Alayass; Assistant referees: Melissa Snedden Prem Gundarah

June 18 8	Halifax Tides	1–1	Vancouver Rise	Halifax, Nova Scotia
07:00 PT	Vallerand 89'	Report	Oularbi 58'	Stadium: Wanderers Grounds; Attendance: 5,516; Referee: Ben Hoskins; Assistant referees: Natalie Berry Travis Lefebvre

June 28 9	Vancouver Rise	1–3	AFC Toronto	Burnaby, British Columbia
14:00 PT	Oularbi 37'; Stanton (yellow card) 60'; De Filippo (yellow card) 67'	Report	Cowart 34' (o.g.); Rowe 62'; Hunter 90+2'	Stadium: Swangard Stadium; Attendance: 3,451; Referee: Myriam Marcotte; Assistant referees: Shukwia Tajik Theo Diederichsen

===== July =====
July 4 10	Montreal Roses	5–1	Vancouver Rise	Laval, Quebec
11:00 PT	Badu 18', 67', 83'; Bilbault (yellow card) 20'; Bennett 53'; Boychuk 70'	Report	De Filippo 42'	Stadium: CS Bois-de-Boulogne; Attendance: 1,891; Referee: Anne-Marie Canuel; Assistant referees: Marko Kalic; Mehmet Sen

July 11 11	Calgary Wild	2–4	Vancouver Rise	Calgary, Alberta
16:00 PT	Dougherty Howard 18'; Baucom 25'; O'Neill (yellow card) 36'	Report	Pante 7'; Lee 37'; Longhurst 86'; López 90+3'	Stadium: McMahon Stadium; Attendance: 2,398; Referee: Sheila Couture; Assistant referees: Sangmuk Choi; Eray Demirtas

July 18 12	AFC Toronto	0–3	Vancouver Rise	Toronto, Ontario
13:00 PT	Small (yellow card) 37'; Brewster (yellow card) 82'; Rowe (yellow card) 90+11'	Report	Bout 2'; De Filippo 9'; Tumeth 11'; López (yellow card) 13'; Stanton (yellow card) 90+2'	Stadium: York Lions Stadium; Attendance: 2,118; Referee: Salma Flores-Desrochers; Assistant referees: Melissa Snedden; Shukwia Tajik

July 25 13	Vancouver Rise	0–1	Halifax Tides	Burnaby, British Columbia
13:00 PT		Report	De Filippo 53' (o.g.); Lemire (yellow card) 63'	Stadium: Swangard Stadium; Attendance: 3,430; Referee: Iwan-Nikita Jecanski; Assistant referees: Gabrielle Lemieux; Allycia Carlucci

July 29 14	Vancouver Rise	3–4	Montreal Roses	Burnaby, British Columbia
19:00 PT	López 3'; Oularbi 17'; Tumeth (yellow card) 45+3'; Abdu 89'	Report	Pechersky 14'; Bennett 39'; Bilbault (yellow card) 46'; Alidou 54'; Seto 58'	Stadium: Swangard Stadium; Referee: Renzo Villanueva; Assistant referees: Stéphanie Fortin; Heather Lloyd

===== August =====
August 8 15	Vancouver Rise	2–3	Calgary Wild	Burnaby, British Columbia
16:00 PT	De Filippo 56', 65'; Tumeth (red card) 83'	Report	T. Stewart 47'; Baucom (yellow card) 73', (goal) 90'; Moore (yellow card) 75'; K. Stewart 90+6'	Stadium: Swangard Stadium; Attendance: 3,498; Referee: Anne-Marie Canuel; Assistant referees: Marko Kalic; Aubrey Kotelko

August 15 16	Vancouver Rise	2–1	Halifax Tides	Burnaby, British Columbia
18:30 PT	López (yellow card) 24'; François (yellow card) 45'; De Filippo 56', 90+4'	Report	Rhodes 18'; Lemire (yellow card) 62'	Stadium: Swangard Stadium; Attendance: 2,674; Referee: Carly Shaw-MacLaren; Assistant referees: Michael Hood; Prem Gundarah

August 22 17	Ottawa Rapid	1–5	Vancouver Rise	Ottawa, Ontario
16:00 PT	Fridlund (yellow card) 45'; Jung (yellow card) 63'; Bell (yellow card) 81'	Report	Reyes (yellow card) 21', (goal) 56'; López (yellow card) 28', (goal) 65'; Lamontagne 45+1', 46'; Bout 48'	Stadium: TD Place Stadium; Attendance: 4,453; Referee: Ben Hoskins; Assistant referees: Allycia Carlucci; Reda Fazazi

August 29 18	Vancouver Rise	2–2	Calgary Wild	Burnaby, British Columbia
15:00 PT	Quinn 39' (pen.); Tumeth (yellow card) 74'; De Filippo 90+4'	Report	Thurton 12'; Johnson 42', (yellow card) 67'	Stadium: Swangard Stadium; Referee: Salma Flores-Desrochers; Assistant referees: Allycia Carlucci; Heather Lloyd

===== September =====
September 5 19	Vancouver Rise	0–1	Halifax Tides	Burnaby, British Columbia
16:00 PT	Lamontagne (yellow card) 37'; Oularbi (yellow card) 84'	Report	Lemire (yellow card) 22'; Cho (yellow card) 37'; Jordan (yellow card) 39'; Vallerand (yellow card) 78'; Benati 90+5'	Stadium: Swangard Stadium; Attendance: 2,966; Referee: Isabelle Duclos; Assistant referees: Melissa Snedden; Theo Diederichsen

September 13 20	Vancouver Rise	4–0	Ottawa Rapid	Burnaby, British Columbia
13:00 PT	François 31'; De Filippo 53'; Abdu 58'; Longhurst 60'	Report		Stadium: Swangard Stadium; Attendance: 2,415; Referee: Yusri Rudolf; Assistant referees: Shukwia Tajik; Prem Gundarah

September 19 21	Vancouver Rise	2–2	Montreal Roses	Burnaby, British Columbia
14:00 PT	Bout (yellow card) 43'; Okamoto (yellow card) 45+1'; Reyes (yellow card) 80'; De Filippo 83'; Tumeth 90+2'	Report	Alidou (yellow card) 41'; Pechersky 67'; Badu 90+3'	Stadium: Swangard Stadium; Referee: Carly Shaw-MacLaren

September 27 22	Calgary Wild	3–1	Vancouver Rise	Calgary, Alberta
13:00 PT	Dougherty Howard (yellow card) 42' (goal) 56'; Otto 47'; Baucom 64'	Report	Lamontagne 35'	Stadium: McMahon Stadium; Attendance: 3,530; Referee: Alain Ruch

===== October =====
October 4 23†	AFC Toronto	2–1 (a.e.t.)	Vancouver Rise	Toronto, Ontario
10:00 PT	Silano 19'; Hunter 100'	Report	Abdu 27'	Stadium: York Lions Stadium; Attendance: 2,675; Referee: Sheila Couture
Note: This game doubled as a quarter-final match in the 2026–27 W Canadian Championship and counted in both competitions; this game counted as a 1–1 draw in the NSL standings and a 1–2 loss in the W Canadian Championship.

October 18 24	Ottawa Rapid	5–2	Vancouver Rise	Ottawa, Ontario
13:00 PT	27', 90+2' Pridham; (yellow card) 32' Lee; (yellow card) 48' Golen; (yellow card) 52' Waite; 53', 68' Belzile; 87' Bell	Report	16' Bout; 17' Abdu; (yellow card) 71' Lamontagne; (yellow card) 79' Stanton	Stadium: TD Place Stadium; Referee: Isabella Duclos; Assistant referees: Aubrey Kotelko; Victoria Lafortune

October 25, 2026 25	Vancouver Rise	3–2	Calgary Wild	Burnaby, British Columbia
	Pante 7', 34'; De Filippo 53'; Bout (yellow card) 56'	Report	Otto (yellow card) 43'; Aulicino 45+2'; Baucom 69'	Stadium: Swangard Stadium; Referee: Sheila Couture

===== Playoffs =====
November 1, 2026 Quarter-finals Leg 1	Vancouver Rise FC	0–3	Montreal Roses FC	Burnaby, British Columbia
7:00 pm EST	Tumeth (yellow card) 45+1'; Abdu (yellow card) 58'; De Filippo (yellow card) 77'	Report	Bennett 11'; Alidou 30'; Pechersky 72'	Stadium: Swangard Stadium; Referee: Isabelle Duclos

November 8, 2026 Quarter-finals Leg 2	Montreal Roses FC	2–2	Vancouver Rise FC	Laval, Quebec
7:00 pm EST	Paquin 39'; Alidou (yellow card) 54'; Badu (yellow card) 58'; Pechersky 77'	Report	Bout (yellow card) 19'; De Filippo 41'; Abdu 45+2'	Stadium: Stade Boréal; Referee: Myriam Marcotte

== Statistics ==
As of September 19, 2026

=== Appearances and goals ===
No.	Pos	Nat	Player	Total		NSL		W Canadian Championship	
No.	Pos	Nat	Player	Apps	Goals	Apps	Goals	Apps	Goals
Goalkeepers
13	GK	(Canada) CAN	Morgan McAslan	10	0	10	0	0	0
31	GK	(Japan) JPN	Jessica Wulf	10	0	10	0	0	0
Defenders
2	DF	(Canada) CAN	Shannon Woeller	0	0	0	0	0	0
3	DF	(Philippines) PHI	Jessika Cowart	12	0	9+3	0	0	0
4	DF	(Canada) CAN	Sura Yekka	16	0	13+3	0	0	0
6	MF	(Australia) AUS	Tori Tumeth	19	2	18+1	2	0	0
12	DF	(Canada) CAN	Jaylyn Wright	10	0	4+6	0	0	0
15	DF	(Canada) CAN	Ariel Young	0	0	0	0	0	0
16	DF	(Canada) CAN	Kennedy Faulknor	7	0	1+6	0	0	0
18	DF	(Japan) JPN	Yuka Okamoto	17	0	15+2	0	0	0
21	DF	(Jamaica) JAM	Chantelle Swaby	3	0	1+2	0	0	0
25	DF	(Canada) CAN	Kaela Hansen	5	0	4+1	0	0	0
33	DF	(Canada) CAN	Racquel Partovi	4	0	0+4	0	0	0
34	DF	(Canada) CAN	Bridget Mutipula	1	0	0+1	0	0	0
38	DF	(Canada) CAN	Chloe Taylor	2	0	0+2	0	0	0
Midfielders
5	MF	(Canada) CAN	Quinn	12	3	11+1	3	0	0
7	MF	(United States) USA	Nikki Stanton	12	0	5+7	0	0	0
10	MF	(Colombia) COL	Camila Reyes	19	2	17+2	2	0	0
14	MF	(Canada) CAN	Anna Bout	21	3	21	3	0	0
24	MF	(Wales) WAL	Josie Longhurst	17	3	6+11	3	0	0
26	MF	(Algeria) ALG	Anaïs Oularbi	14	3	8+6	3	0	0
46	MF	(Canada) CAN	Adalyn Fairweather	0	0	0	0	0	0
Forwards
8	FW	(Canada) CAN	Alex Lamontagne	6	2	4+2	2	0	0
11	FW	(Canada) CAN	Jessica De Filippo	21	12	19+2	12	0	0
17	FW	(Canada) CAN	Audrey François	7	1	2+5	1	0	0
22	DF	(Canada) CAN	Mia Pante	14	1	13+1	1	0	0
23	FW	(Colombia) COL	Maithé López	15	3	9+6	3	0	0
28	FW	(Canada) CAN	Jaime Perrault	15	0	5+10	0	0	0
39	FW	(Canada) CAN	Lacey Kindel	2	0	0+2	0	0	0
45	FW	(Canada) CAN	Myla Ewasiuk	8	0	5+3	0	0	0
59	FW	(Canada) CAN	Allie Pazarka	0	0	0	0	0	0
99	FW	(Canada) CAN	Latifah Abdu	18	4	16+2	4	0	0
Player(s) transferred out during the season
1	GK	(Canada) CAN	Kirstin Tynan	1	0	1	0	0	0
9	FW	(United States) USA	Mariah Lee	9	1	5+4	1	0	0

Source: Competitions

=== Goalscorers ===
Rank	No.	Pos	Nat	Player	NSL	W Canadian Championship	Total
1	11	FW	(Canada)	Jessica De Filippo	12		12
2	99	FW	(Canada)	Latifah Abdu	4		4
3	5	MF	(Canada)	Quinn	3		3
3	10	MF	(Colombia)	Camila Reyes	3		3
3	14	MF	(Canada)	Anna Bout	3		3
3	23	FW	(Colombia)	Maithé López	3		3
3	24	MF	(Wales)	Josie Longhurst	3		3
3	26	MF	(Algeria)	Anaïs Oularbi	3		3
9	6	DF	(Australia)	Tori Tumeth	2		2
9	8	FW	(Canada)	Alex Lamontagne	2		2
11	9	FW	(United States)	Mariah Lee	1		1
11	17	FW	(Canada)	Audrey François	1		1
11	22	DF	(Canada)	Mia Pante	1		1

=== Assists ===
Rank	No.	Pos	Nat	Player	NSL	W Canadian Championship	Total
1	11	FW	(Canada)	Jessica De Filippo	4		4
1	14	MF	(Canada)	Anna Bout	4		4
3	10	MF	(Colombia)	Camila Reyes	3		3
3	99	FW	(Canada)	Latifah Abdu	3		3
5	5	MF	(Canada)	Quinn	2		2
5	23	FW	(Colombia)	Maithé López	2		2
7	4	DF	(Canada)	Sura Yekka	1		1
7	8	FW	(Canada)	Alex Lamontagne	1		1
7	22	DF	(Canada)	Mia Pante	1		1
7	28	FW	(Canada)	Jaime Perrault	1		1

=== Clean sheets ===
Rank	No.	Pos	Nat	Player	NSL	W Canadian Championship	Total
1	13	GK	(Canada)	Morgan McAslan	1		1
1	31	GK	(Canada)	Morgan McAslan	1		1

=== Disciplinary record ===
No.	Pos	Nat	Player	NSL			W Canadian Championship			Total		
No.	Pos	Nat	Player	Yellow card	(yellow card) (yellow-red card)	Red card	Yellow card	(yellow card) (yellow-red card)	Red card	Yellow card	(yellow card) (yellow-red card)	Red card
1	GK	(Canada)	Kirstin Tynan	0	0	0	0	0	0	0	0	0
13	GK	(Canada)	Morgan McAslan	0	0	0	0	0	0	0	0	0
31	GK	(Canada)	Jessica Wulf	0	0	0	0	0	0	0	0	0
2	DF	(Canada)	Shannon Woeller	0	0	0	0	0	0	0	0	0
3	DF	(Philippines)	Jessika Cowart	0	0	0	0	0	0	0	0	0
4	DF	(Canada)	Sura Yekka	0	0	0	0	0	0	0	0	0
6	MF	(Australia)	Tori Tumeth	4	0	1	0	0	0	4	0	1
12	DF	(Canada)	Jaylyn Wright	1	0	0	0	0	0	1	0	0
15	DF	(Canada)	Ariel Young	0	0	0	0	0	0	0	0	0
16	DF	(Canada)	Kennedy Faulknor	0	0	1	0	0	0	0	0	1
18	DF	(Japan)	Yuka Okamoto	1	0	0	0	0	0	1	0	0
21	DF	(Jamaica)	Chantelle Swaby	0	0	0	0	0	0	0	0	0
25	DF	(Canada)	Kaela Hansen	0	0	0	0	0	0	0	0	0
33	DF	(Canada)	Raquel Partovi	0	0	0	0	0	0	0	0	0
34	DF	(Canada)	Bridget Mutipula	0	0	0	0	0	0	0	0	0
38	DF	(Canada)	Chloe Taylor	0	0	0	0	0	0	0	0	0
5	MF	(Canada)	Quinn	0	0	0	0	0	0	0	0	0
7	MF	(United States)	Nikki Stanton	3	0	0	0	0	0	3	0	0
10	MF	(Colombia)	Camila Reyes	4	0	0	0	0	0	4	0	0
14	MF	(Canada)	Anna Bout	2	0	0	0	0	0	2	0	0
24	MF	(Wales)	Josie Longhurst	0	0	0	0	0	0	0	0	0
26	MF	(Algeria)	Anaïs Oularbi	1	0	0	0	0	0	1	0	0
46	MF	(Canada)	Adalyn Fairweather	0	0	0	0	0	0	0	0	0
8	FW	(Canada)	Alex Lamontagne	1	0	0	0	0	0	1	0	0
9	FW	(United States)	Mariah Lee	0	0	0	0	0	0	0	0	0
11	FW	(Canada)	Jessica De Filippo	4	0	0	0	0	0	4	0	0
17	FW	(Canada)	Audrey François	1	0	0	0	0	0	1	0	0
22	DF	(Canada)	Mia Pante	0	0	0	0	0	0	0	0	0
23	FW	(Colombia)	Maithé López	3	0	0	0	0	0	3	0	0
28	FW	(Canada)	Jaime Perrault	0	0	0	0	0	0	0	0	0
39	FW	(Canada)	Lacey Kindel	0	0	0	0	0	0	0	0	0
45	FW	(Canada)	Myla Ewasiuk	0	0	0	0	0	0	0	0	0
59	FW	(Canada)	Allie Pazarka	0	0	0	0	0	0	0	0	0
99	FW	(Canada)	Latifah Abdu	0	0	0	0	0	0	0	0	0

== Honours ==
=== Monthly Honours ===
Player of the Month
Month	Player	Source
August	Jessica De Filippo	

=== Weekly Honours ===
Stars of the Week
Week	Player(s)	Source
5	Quinn	
12	Mia Pante	
13	Quinn (2)	
16	Jessica De Filippo	
17	Jessica De Filippo (2)	
18	Alex Lamontagne	

Save of the Week
Week	Player(s)	Source
1	Morgan McAslan	

Goal of the Week
Week	Player(s)	Source
10	Anaïs Oularbi	
17	Jessica De Filippo	

== Transfers ==
=== In ===
No.	Pos.	Player	From club	Fee/notes	Date	Source
17	FW	(Canada) Audrey François	(United States) Harvard Crimson		January 14, 2026	
4	DF	(Canada) Sura Yekka	(Sweden) Djurgårdens IF		January 16, 2026	
10	FW	(Colombia) Camila Reyes	(Colombia) Santa Fe		January 28, 2026	
6	MF	(Australia) Tori Tumeth	(Australia) Sydney FC		April 27, 2026	
8	FW	(Canada) Alex Lamontagne	(France) Saint-Étienne		July 27, 2026	
25	DF	(Canada) Kaela Hansen	(Canada) AFC Toronto		August 13, 2026	
21	DF	(Jamaica) Chantelle Swaby	(England) Leicester City		August 13, 2026	

=== Loans in ===
No.	Pos.	Player	From club	Fee/notes	Date	Source
23	MF	(Colombia) Maithé López	(United States) Angel City		January 29, 2026	
22	DF	(Canada) Mia Pante	(Italy) AS Roma		February 6, 2026	
38	DF	(Canada) Chloe Taylor	(Canada) Vancouver Rise Academy	Youth development permit	April 24, 2026	
39	FW	(Canada) Lacey Kindel	(Canada) Vancouver Rise Academy	Youth development permit	April 24, 2026	
34	DF	(Canada) Bridget Mutipula	(Canada) Vancouver Rise Academy	Youth development permit	May 18, 2026	
59	FW	(Canada) Allie Pazarka	(Canada) Vancouver Rise Academy	Youth development permit	May 30, 2026	
45	FW	(Canada) Myla Ewasiuk	(Canada) Vancouver Rise Academy	Youth development permit	July 4, 2026	
33	DF	(Canada) Racquel Partovi	(Canada) Vancouver Rise Academy	Youth development permit	July 25, 2026	
46	MF	(Canada) Adalyn Fairweather	(Canada) Vancouver Rise Academy	Youth development permit	September 13, 2026	

=== Out ===
No.	Pos.	Player	To club	Fee/notes	Date	Source
3	DF	(United States) Jasmyne Spencer			November 27, 2025	
4	DF	(Canada) Kayla Gonçalves			November 27, 2025	
17	MF	(Sweden) Sara Lilja Vidlund			November 27, 2025	
28	DF	(New Zealand) Rebecca Lake			November 27, 2025	
10	MF	(Canada) Lisa Pechersky	(Canada) Montreal Roses		December 11, 2025	
8	MF	(Canada) Samantha Chang	(Canada) AFC Toronto		January 6, 2026	
6	MF	(Sweden) Sofia Hagman	(Norway) FK Bodø/Glimt Kvinner		January 9, 2026	
25	FW	(Egypt) Nedya Sawan			January 9, 2026	
19	FW	(Canada) Holly Ward	(United States) Seattle Reign	Fee undisclosed	March 13, 2026	
9	FW	(United States) Mariah Lee		Retirement	July 25, 2026	

=== Loans out ===
No.	Pos.	Player	To club	Fee/notes	Date	Source
1	GK	(Canada) Kirstin Tynan	(Canada) Halifax Tides	Until the end of the season	August 12, 2026	
