= Maithé López =

Colombian footballer (born 2007)

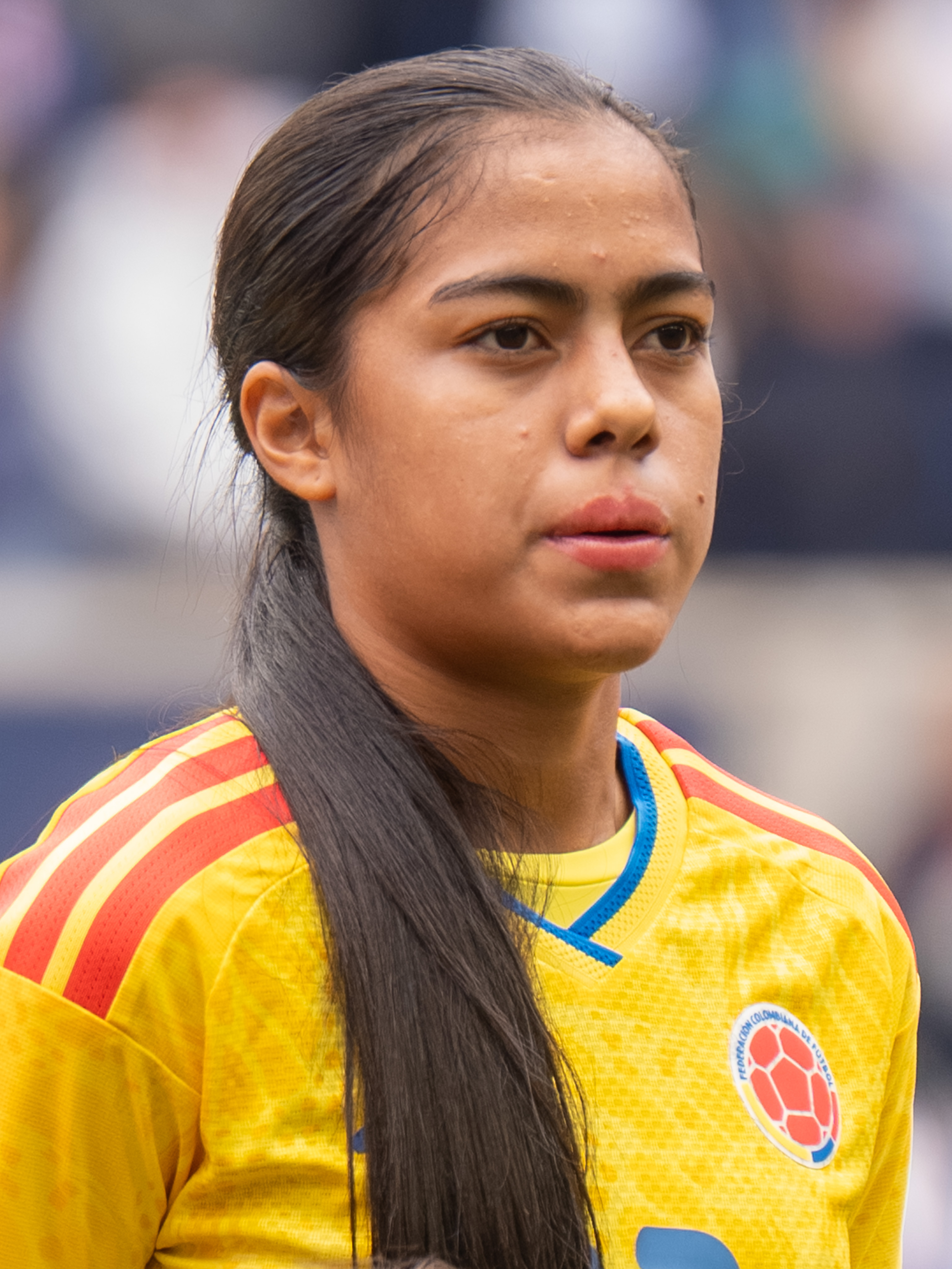
- López with Colombia in 2026

Personal information
- Full name: Maithé López Miranda
- Date of birth: 24 January 2007 (age 19)
- Place of birth: Bucaramanga, Colombia
- Position: Forward

Team information
- Current team: Vancouver Rise (on loan from Angel City FC)
- Number: 23

Youth career
- Botín de Oro

Senior career*
Years	Team	Apps	(Gls)
2024	Real Santander	1	(1)
2025–	Angel City FC	0	(0)
2025	→ Lexington SC (loan)	7	(1)
2026–	→ Vancouver Rise (loan)	15	(3)

International career^{‡}
2024	Colombia U17	9	(2)
2024–	Colombia U20	16	(1)
2026–	Colombia		
Medal record
Women's football
Representing Colombia
FIFA U-20 Women's World Cup
Third place	2026 Poland
South American U-17 Championship
Runner-up	2024 Paraguay
- * Club domestic league appearances and goals as of 4 September 2025 ‡ National team caps and goals as of 22 October 2024

Maithé López Miranda (born 24 January 2007) is a Colombian professional footballer who plays as a forward for Northern Super League club Vancouver Rise, on loan from National Women's Soccer League club Angel City FC, and the Colombia national team.

A product of youth football in Bucaramanga, López scored on her professional debut for Real Santander at 17 and signed a four-year contract with Angel City in 2025, spending loans with Lexington SC and Vancouver Rise. At youth level she helped Colombia finish as runners-up at the 2024 South American U-17 Women's Championship and played at the 2024 FIFA U-17 and U-20 Women's World Cups, the latter while still eligible at under-17 level. She made her senior international debut against the United States at the 2026 SheBelieves Cup.

== Early life ==
López was born in Bucaramanga, Santander, and grew up in the city. Her family has roots in Carrillo, a rural district of San Pelayo, Córdoba, where her grandfather founded and ran the local football club. She began playing competitively at the age of ten and went through the youth programmes of Bucaramanga clubs Restrepo & Restrepo and Botín de Oro. Under coach Alex Spencer Uribe, she was the leading scorer for the Santander departmental league in 2023 and scored the only goal of the national under-19 final against Antioquia.

== Club career ==
=== Real Santander ===
López made her professional debut for Real Santander in the Colombian Women's Football League on 8 June 2024, aged 17, and scored against Deportivo Pereira.

=== Angel City and Lexington SC ===
On 21 February 2025, Angel City FC of the NWSL announced that they had acquired López from Real Santander for an undisclosed fee on a four-year contract, and loaned her to USL Super League club Lexington SC. Her first goal for Lexington came on 19 April, a header that opened the scoring in a 1–1 draw with Brooklyn FC. Angel City recalled her on 10 October 2025, after she had made seven appearances and scored once on loan.

=== Vancouver Rise ===
On 29 January 2026, Angel City loaned López for the 2026 season to Vancouver Rise, the reigning Northern Super League champions. Used mainly as a substitute in the first half of the season, she came on in the 56th minute of a 3–1 home defeat to Ottawa Rapid FC at Swangard Stadium on 14 June, and crossed from the left to find Latifah Abdu in the box as Vancouver chased a way back. Four days later, as a second-half substitute in a 1–1 draw at Halifax Tides FC, she cut in from the left and hit a strike from the edge of the box that was deflected over. Just after Halifax equalised, she volleyed another chance over the crossbar.

Her breakthrough came off the bench against Calgary Wild FC at McMahon Stadium on 11 July. With the score 2–2, she set up Josie Longhurst's headed go-ahead goal in the 86th minute. In the third minute of stoppage time she scored her first goal for the club to seal a 4–2 win, Vancouver's first ever victory in Calgary. On 29 July, against the league's second-placed side, Montreal Roses FC, at Swangard Stadium, she gave Vancouver a third-minute lead by pouncing on a loose ball after an Anaïs Oularbi corner. In the 17th minute she flicked the ball on for Oularbi to make it 2–1. She was substituted in the 65th minute, and Montreal came from behind to win 4–3.

López became a regular starter in August. On 22 August, at TD Place Stadium, she added the fifth goal of a 5–1 rout of Ottawa in the 65th minute: collecting a pass from Jessica De Filippo, she cut inside from the left and curled her shot in off the far post.

== International career ==
=== Youth ===
López scored two goals in six matches as Colombia finished runners-up at the 2024 South American U-17 Women's Championship in Paraguay, qualifying for the World Cup; against Ecuador she scored once and set up two more. Named as one of the leaders of the squad, she then played at the 2024 FIFA U-17 Women's World Cup in the Dominican Republic. Colombia drew 1–1 with South Korea and lost to the United States and Spain, going out in the group stage.

Although still eligible at under-17 level, López was selected for the 2024 FIFA U-20 Women's World Cup, which Colombia hosted. She made her debut against Australia on 31 August 2024 and set up Linda Caicedo's goal in the 70th minute. Colombia reached the quarter-finals, where they were eliminated by the Netherlands on penalties after a 2–2 draw in Cali on 17 September.

She scored twice at the 2026 South American Under-20 Women's Football Championship in Paraguay as Colombia qualified for the 2026 FIFA U-20 Women's World Cup. At that World Cup, held in Poland, she was injured in a collision in the 25th minute of the round-of-16 match against the hosts on 17 September 2026 and substituted. The knee injury ruled her out of the rest of the tournament, in which Colombia went on to reach the semi-finals.

=== Senior ===
López trained with the senior team as a training player at the 2025 SheBelieves Cup. In March 2026, she was added to the squad for the 2026 SheBelieves Cup straight from the South American U-20 Championship. On 7 March, she made her senior debut in the starting line-up against the United States in Harrison, New Jersey, playing 56 minutes of a 1–0 defeat.

In April 2026, López was named in the squad for matchdays five to seven of the 2025–26 CONMEBOL Women's Nations League, against Venezuela, Chile and Argentina. She was retained for the final two matchdays in June. In those matches Colombia beat Uruguay 1–0 in Cali on 5 June and Paraguay 4–3 in Asunción on 9 June. The win in Asunción made Colombia the competition's first champions and sent them directly to the 2027 FIFA Women's World Cup.

== Style of play ==
López is a fast, powerful, two-footed forward who positions herself well in the box and is strong on the dribble and in front of goal.

== Honours ==
Colombia

- CONMEBOL Women's Nations League: 2025–26

Colombia U17

- South American U-17 Women's Championship runner-up: 2024

Colombia U20

- FIFA U-20 Women's World Cup third place: 2026
