= Chloe Taylor (soccer) =

Canadian soccer player (born 2006)

Personal information
- Full name: Chloe Doreen Taylor
- Date of birth: September 2, 2008 (age 18)
- Place of birth: North Vancouver, British Columbia, Canada
- Height: 5 ft 9 in (1.75 m)
- Positions: Defender; midfielder

Youth career
- Burnaby FC
- Whitecaps FC Girls Elite

College career
| Years | Team | Apps | (Gls) |
| 2026– | Auburn Tigers | 4 | (2) |

Senior career*
| Years | Team | Apps | (Gls) |
| 2024–2026 | Vancouver Rise FC Academy (Note: Whitecaps FC Girls Elite re-branded as the Vancouver Rise FC Academy in 2025) | 23 | (8) |
| 2025–2026 | → Vancouver Rise FC (loan) | 5 | (0) |

International career^{‡}
| 2025 | Canada U17 | 8+ | (1+) |
| 2026– | Canada U20 | 3+ | (0+) |
- * Club domestic league appearances and goals as of October 5, 2026 ‡ National team caps and goals as of October 5, 2026

Chloe Doreen Taylor (born September 2, 2008) is a Canadian soccer player.

== Early life ==
Taylor played youth soccer with Burnaby FC. She later joined the Whitecaps FC Girls Elite (later re-branded as Vancouver Rise FC Academy). She won their Academic Progress Award in 2024.

== College career ==
In 2026, Taylor began attending Auburn University, where she played for the women's soccer team. On August 16, 2026, she scored her first goal in a 5–0 victory over the Jacksonville State Gamecocks, earning SEC Freshman of the Week honours.

== Club career ==
In 2024, Taylor began playing with Whitecaps FC Girls Elite (later re-branded as Vancouver Rise FC Academy) in League1 British Columbia (later re-branded as the British Columbia Premier League). In 2025 and 2026, she signed Youth Development Permits with Vancouver Rise FC in the Northern Super League, enabling in her to play some professional matches.

== International career ==
In January 2025, Taylor was caleld up to the Canada U17 team for the Costa Cálida MIMA Cup in Spain. In March she was called up for the 2025 CONCACAF U-17 Women's World Cup qualification tournament. In July 2025, Taylor was named to the side for a 4-Nations tournament. In October, she was named to the team for the 2025 FIFA U-17 Women's World Cup, where she served as a team captain.

Taylor was called up to the Canada U20 team for friendlies in April and June 2026. In August 2026, she was named to the squad for the 2026 FIFA U-20 Women's World Cup.

== Career statistics ==
As of October 5, 2026

| Club | Season | League | | | Playoffs | | Domestic Cup | | Continental | | Other | | Total | |
| Club | Season | Division | Apps | Goals | Apps | Goals | Apps | Goals | Apps | Goals | Apps | Goals | Apps | Goals |
|---|---|---|---|---|---|---|---|---|---|---|---|---|---|---|
| Vancouver Rise FC Academy | 2024 | League1 British Columbia | 9 | 2 | 2 | 0 | — | | 5 | 0 | 2 (Note: Appearance(s) in Women's Inter-Provincial Championship) | 0 | 18 | 2 |
| Vancouver Rise FC Academy | 2025 | League1 British Columbia | 9 | 2 | — | | — | | 3 | 0 | — | | 12 | 2 |
| Vancouver Rise FC Academy | 2026 | British Columbia Premier League | 5 | 4 | — | | — | | — | | — | | 5 | 4 |
| Vancouver Rise FC Academy | Total | | 23 | 8 | 2 | 0 | 0 | 0 | 8 | 0 | 2 | 0 | 35 | 8 |
| Vancouver Rise FC (loan) | 2025 | Northern Super League | 3 | 0 | 0 | 0 | — | | — | | — | | 3 | 0 |
| Vancouver Rise FC (loan) | 2026 | Northern Super League | 2 | 0 | 0 | 0 | — | | — | | — | | 2 | 0 |
| Vancouver Rise FC (loan) | Total | | 5 | 0 | 0 | 0 | 0 | 0 | 0 | 0 | 0 | 0 | 5 | 0 |
| Career total | | | 28 | 8 | 2 | 0 | 0 | 0 | 8 | 0 | 2 | 0 | 40 | 8 |
