= Anna Bout =

Canadian soccer player (born 2001)

- Bout in 2026

Personal information
- Full name: Anna Maria Bout
- Date of birth: April 23, 2001 (age 25)
- Place of birth: Cambridge, Ontario, Canada
- Height: 5 ft 8 in (1.73 m)
- Position: Midfielder

Team information
- Current team: Vancouver Rise FC
- Number: 14

Youth career
- Cambridge United
- 2017–2019: Burlington SC
- 2019: Guelph SC

College career
Years	Team	Apps	(Gls)
2019–2023	Pittsburgh Panthers	97	(8)

Senior career*
Years	Team	Apps	(Gls)
2024–2025	Odense Boldklub Q	24	(2)
2025–	Vancouver Rise FC	7	(0)
2025–	→ Vancouver Rise FC Academy	0	(0)
- * Club domestic league appearances and goals as of October 17, 2025

Anna Maria Bout (born April 23, 2001) is a Canadian soccer player who plays for Vancouver Rise FC in the Northern Super League.

== Early life ==
Bout played youth soccer with Cambridge United, before joining Burlington SC in 2017. In 2019, she played with Guelph SC. She also played with the Ontario provincial team from 2015 to 2017. Bout attended St. John's-Kilmarnock School, where she was a multi-sport athlete in track and field, field hockey, ringette, and soccer.

== College career ==
In 2019, Bout began attending the University of Pittsburgh, where she played for the women's soccer team. She made her collegiate debut on August 23, 2019, against the Loyola Marymount Lions. On September 13, 2020, she scored her first collegiate goal in a 7–1 victory over the Appalachian State Mountaineers. In October 2023, she was named the school's Achiever of the Week, after scoring the winning goal to help the team earn their first ever victory over the Duke Blue Devils. Over her five seasons with Pittsburgh, she was named to the ACC Academic Honor Roll three times (2019–20, 2020–21, and 2022–23) and the All-ACC Academic Team twice (2022 and 2023).

== Club career ==
In August 2024, Bout signed with Danish club Odense Boldklub Q in the first tier Kvindeligaen on a one-year contract. After the season, where she scored two goals and added seven assists in 26 appearances in all competitions, she departed the club.

In August 2025, she signed with Northern Super League club Vancouver Rise FC. She also played with the Vancouver Rise FC Academy in the 2025–26 CONCACAF W Champions Cup, scoring against Gotham FC in their group stage match.

== Career statistics ==
As of October 4, 2026

Appearances and goals by club, season and competition
Club	Season	League			Playoffs		National Cup		Continental		Total	
Club	Season	Division	Apps	Goals	Apps	Goals	Apps	Goals	Apps	Goals	Apps	Goals
Odense Boldklub Q	2024–25	A-Liga	24	2	—		2	0	—		26	2
Vancouver Rise FC	2025	Northern Super League	7	0	2	0	—		—		9	0
Vancouver Rise FC	2026	Northern Super League	23	3	0	0	—		—		23	3
Vancouver Rise FC	Total		30	3	2	0	0	0	0	0	32	3
Vancouver Rise FC Academy (loan)	2025	League1 British Columbia	0	0	—		—		1	1	1	1
Career total			54	5	2	0	2	0	1	1	59	6
