= Ariel Young =

Canadian soccer player (born 2001)

Personal information
- Full name: Ariel Audrey Young
- Date of birth: August 30, 2001 (age 25)
- Place of birth: Walkerton, Ontario, Canada
- Height: 5 ft 11 in (1.80 m)
- Position: Defender

Team information
- Current team: Vancouver Rise
- Number: 15

Youth career
- 2008–2016: Ottawa South United
- 2016–2018: Ottawa Fury
- 2018: Ontario REX
- 2018–2019: Vancouver Whitecaps REX

College career
Years	Team	Apps	(Gls)
2021–2023	UCF Knights	42	(2)

Senior career*
Years	Team	Apps	(Gls)
2024	Fortuna Hjørring	8	(0)
2025–	Vancouver Rise	9	(0)

International career^{‡}
2017–2018	Canada U17	7+	(1)
2018	Canada U20	2	(0)
2017	Canada	1	(0)
- * Club domestic league appearances and goals as of October 17, 2025 ‡ National team caps and goals as of June 10, 2018

Ariel Audrey Young (born August 30, 2001) is a Canadian soccer player who currently plays as a defender for the Vancouver Rise FC in the Northern Super League. In 2017, she earned a cap with the Canada national team.

== Early life ==
Young began playing youth soccer with Ottawa South United at age seven. She was named to the Ontario provincial team at age 13, and joined the Ottawa Fury Academy at U15 level. In 2017, at age 15, she played for U18 Team Ontario at the 2017 Canada Summer Games. She then moved to the Ontario REX program in 2018, where she played for six months. In August 2018, she joined the Vancouver Whitecaps REX program.

== College career ==
In November 2018, Young committed to the University of Central Florida to play for the women's soccer team beginning in September 2019. Ultimately, she redshirted her first two seasons and began playing for the team in 2021. She scored her first collegiate goal on September 9, 2021, against the Ole Miss Rebels. In October 2021, she earned AAC Rookie of the Week honours. After her first season, she was a unanimous selection to the AAC All-Rookie Team. In 2023, she earned Fall Academic All-Big 12 honours.

== Club career ==
In January 2024, Young signed with Danish Women's League club Fortuna Hjørring.

In December 2024, she signed with Vancouver Rise in the Northern Super League, ahead of the inaugural 2025 season.

== International career ==
In February 2017, she made her debut in the Canadian youth program, attending a camp with the Canada U17 team. In July 2017, she played with the U17s at the Four Nations tournament in China, scoring a goal in a 1–1 draw against the United States U17.

In November 2017, she was called up to the Canada senior team, making her debut on November 12 in a 3–1 defeat to the United States in a friendly at age 16.

She was named to the roster for the 2018 CONCACAF Women's U-17 Championship, where she won a bronze medal, and the 2018 FIFA U-17 Women's World Cup, finishing in fourth. She also played with the Canada U20 at the 2018 CONCACAF Women's U-20 Championship.
