= Alex Lamontagne =

Canadian soccer player (born 1996)

Personal information
- Full name: Alexandria Lamontagne-Maycock
- Date of birth: July 27, 1996 (age 30)
- Place of birth: Richmond Hill, Ontario, Canada
- Height: 5 ft 6 in (1.68 m)
- Position: Forward

Team information
- Current team: Vancouver Rise FC
- Number: 8

Youth career
- Malvern SC
- Ajax United SC
- Ajax SC

College career
Years	Team	Apps	(Gls)
2014–2017	Syracuse Orange	71	(10)

Senior career*
Years	Team	Apps	(Gls)
2015–2017	Durham United FA	12	(22)
2018	Calgary Foothills WFC		
2018–2019	FC Fleury 91	18	(2)
2019	Calgary Foothills WFC		(6)
2020–2023	Rodez	28	(17)
2023–2026	Saint-Étienne	53	(6)
2026–	Vancouver Rise FC	0	(0)

International career
2015–2016	Canada U20	7	(0)
2017	Canada	2	(0)
- * Club domestic league appearances and goals as of July 27, 2026

Alexandria Lamontagne-Maycock (born July 27, 1996) is a Canadian soccer player who plays as a forward for Northern Super League club Vancouver Rise FC.

== Early life ==
Lamontagne was born in Richmond Hill, Ontario and moved to Whitby, Ontario at the age of seven. She began playing soccer at age four with Malvern SC. She initially played as a goalkeeper and defender, before eventually transitioning to an attacking role. Until the age of nine, she played on boys teams. She later played for Ajax United SC and Ajax SC. She also played for the Ontario provincial team.

== College career ==
In 2014, she committed to the Syracuse University where she played for the women's soccer team. She scored her first goal on August 29, 2014 against the Albany Great Danes. In her freshman season, she scored three goals and added four assists in 17 games.

== Club career ==
From 2015 to 2017, she played for Durham United FA in League1 Ontario. In 2015, she finished second in the league in goals with 18. In 2016, she scored one goal in four appearances. In 2017, she scored three goals in eight appearances.

In 2018, she joined Calgary Foothills WFC in United Women's Soccer.

Afterwards she joined French First Division club FC Fleury 91. She departed the club after one season.

In the summer of 2019, she returned to the Foothills. She was named to the Week 9 Team of the Week after scoring a hat trick against the Colorado Pride. She was named to the All-UWS First Team and was named the UWS West Offensive Player of the Year. She then played two matches with Calgary Blizzard SC in the Alberta Major Soccer League.

In 2020, she joined Rodez AF in the French second division. In the opening match of the season, she scored four goals in a 5-2 victory over Thonon Evian. Lamontagne would score 8 goals in 6 games in the 2020–21 season, and 9 goals in 18 games in the 2021–22 season, helping Rodez gain promotion to the first division.

In June 2023, she signed with Saint-Étienne in the French first tier. In June 2025, she signed an extension with the club.

In July 2026, she returned to Canada to sign with Northern Super League club Vancouver Rise FC.

== International career ==
Internationally, Lamontagne represented Canada U20s at the 2015 CONCACAF Women's U-20 Championship winning a silver medal, and at the 2016 FIFA U-20 Women's World Cup.

In 2017, she was named to the roster for the Canada Senior Team for the 2017 Algarve Cup. She made her debut on March 3, 2017, against Russia at the 2017 Algarve Cup.
