= Jessica Wulf =

Japanese footballer (born 2005)

Jessica Wulf ウルフ ジェシカ 結吏
Personal information
- Full name: Jessica Yuri Wulf
- Date of birth: May 20, 2005 (age 21)
- Place of birth: Kawasaki, Kanagawa, Japan
- Height: 1.77 m (5 ft 9 1/2 in)
- Position: Goalkeeper

Team information
- Current team: Vancouver Rise FC
- Number: 31

Youth career
- AC Todoroki
- Nippon TV Tokyo Verdy Menina

Senior career*
| Years | Team | Apps | (Gls) |
| 2023–2025 | Nippon TV Tokyo Verdy Beleza | 0 | (0) |
| 2025– | Vancouver Rise FC | 12 | (0) |
| 2025 | → Vancouver Rise FC Academy | 1 | (0) |

International career^{‡}
| 2022 | Japan U17 | 1 | (0) |
- * Club domestic league appearances and goals as of 9 November 2026 ‡ National team caps and goals as of 15 October 2022

Jessica Yuri Wulf (ウルフ ジェシカ 結吏, Wulf Jessica Yuri; born 20 May 2005) is a Japanese footballer who plays for Vancouver Rise FC in the Northern Super League.

== Early life ==
Wulf played youth football with AC Todoroki and Nippon TV Tokyo Verdy Menina. In January 2023, she won the Japan U18 league title, making the winning save in a penalty shootout.

== Club career ==
In December 2023, Wulf was promoted to the Nippon TV Tokyo Verdy Beleza first team. In June 2024, she signed an extension for another season. She did not appear in any WE League matches, but made three appearances in the Empress's Cup with Nippon TV Tokyo Menina.

In February 2025, she signed with Vancouver Rise FC of the Northern Super League. In September 2025, she joined the Vancouver Rise FC Academy for the 2025–26 CONCACAF W Champions Cup. She made her professional debut for the Rise on 18 May 2026, featuring in the club's first win of the 2026 season, a 2–1 victory against Halifax Tides FC. At the conclusion of the 2026 season, Wulf had played 12 games for the Rise.

== International career ==
In November 2021, Wulf was called up to a training camp with the Japan U16. In 2022, Wulf represented Japan U17 at the 2022 FIFA U-17 Women's World Cup. In September 2023, she was invited to a training camp with the Japan U19. In 2024, Wulf represented Japan U20 at the 2024 FIFA U-20 Women's World Cup.

== Career statistics ==
As of October 24, 2025

| Club | Season | League | | | Playoffs | | Domestic Cup | | League Cup | | Continental | | Total | |
| Club | Season | Division | Apps | Goals | Apps | Goals | Apps | Goals | Apps | Goals | Apps | Goals | Apps | Goals |
|---|---|---|---|---|---|---|---|---|---|---|---|---|---|---|
| Nippon TV Tokyo Verdy Menina | 2023–24 | — | — | | — | | 3 | 0 | — | | — | | 3 | 0 |
| Nippon TV Tokyo Verdy Beleza | 2023–24 | WE League | 0 | 0 | — | | 0 | 0 | — | | 0 | 0 | 0 | 0 |
| Nippon TV Tokyo Verdy Beleza | 2024–25 | WE League | 0 | 0 | — | | 0 | 0 | — | | 0 | 0 | 0 | 0 |
| Vancouver Rise FC | 2025 | Northern Super League | 0 | 0 | 0 | 0 | — | | — | | — | | 0 | 0 |
| Vancouver Rise FC Academy (loan) | 2025 | League1 British Columbia | 1 | 0 | — | | — | | 2 | 0 | — | | 3 | 0 |
| Vancouver Rise FC | 2026 | Northern Super League | 12 | 0 | 0 | 0 | 0 | 0 | — | | — | | 12 | 0 |
| Career total | | | 13 | 0 | 0 | 0 | 3 | 0 | 2 | 0 | 0 | 0 | 18 | 0 |
