= María Camila Reyes =

Colombian footballer (born 2002)

Personal information
- Full name: María Camila Reyes Calderón
- Date of birth: 11 May 2002 (age 24)
- Place of birth: Bogotá, Colombia
- Height: 1.63 m (5 ft 4 in)
- Position: Midfielder

Team information
- Current team: Vancouver Rise
- Number: 10

Senior career*
Years	Team	Apps	(Gls)
2021	Deportivo Cali	12	(2)
2022–2025	Santa Fe	63	(21)
2026–	Vancouver Rise	22	(2)

International career^{‡}
2018	Colombia U17	5	(0)
2019–	Colombia	4	(0)
2020-2022	Colombia U20	14	(2)
Medal record
Women's football
Representing Colombia
Bolivarian Games
Gold medal – first place	2022 Valledupar	Team
South American Under-20 Women's Football Championship
Runner-up	2022 Chile
- * Club domestic league appearances and goals as of 10 November 2026 ‡ National team caps and goals as of 18 July 2023

María Camila Reyes Calderón (born 11 May 2002) is a Colombian professional footballer who plays as a midfielder for Northern Super League club Vancouver Rise FC and the Colombia national team.

== Club career ==
Reyes began her senior career at Deportivo Cali in 2021. The following season, she signed with Santa Fe. Reyes spent four seasons with Santa Fe, scoring 21 goals across 63 appearances.

On 28 January 2026, Northern Super League club Vancouver Rise FC announced that they had signed Reyes ahead of the league's second season of play. She became the third player in the Rise's history to score in their debut, as she scored in the opening game of the 2026 season, a 3–2 loss to AFC Toronto on 24 April 2026.

== International career ==
Reyes was a youth international for Colombia, having played for the U17 and U-20 team. As part of the U-20 squad, she was the captain of that squad at the 2022 FIFA U-20 Women's World Cup. She also competed at the Bolivarian Games and was part of that team that won the gold medal.

On 4 July 2023, Reyes was added to Colombia's 2023 FIFA Women's World Cup squad.

Reyes was called up to the Colombia squad for the 2024 CONCACAF W Gold Cup. On 5 July 2024, she was called up to the Colombia squad for the 2024 Summer Olympics.

== Honours ==
Deportivo Cali

- Liga Femenina Profesional: 2021

Independiente Santa Fe

- Liga Femenina Profesional: 2023

Colombia U-20

- Bolivarian Games gold medal: 2022
- South American Under-20 Women's Football Championship runner-up: 2022
