= Quinn (soccer) =

Canadian soccer player (born 1995)

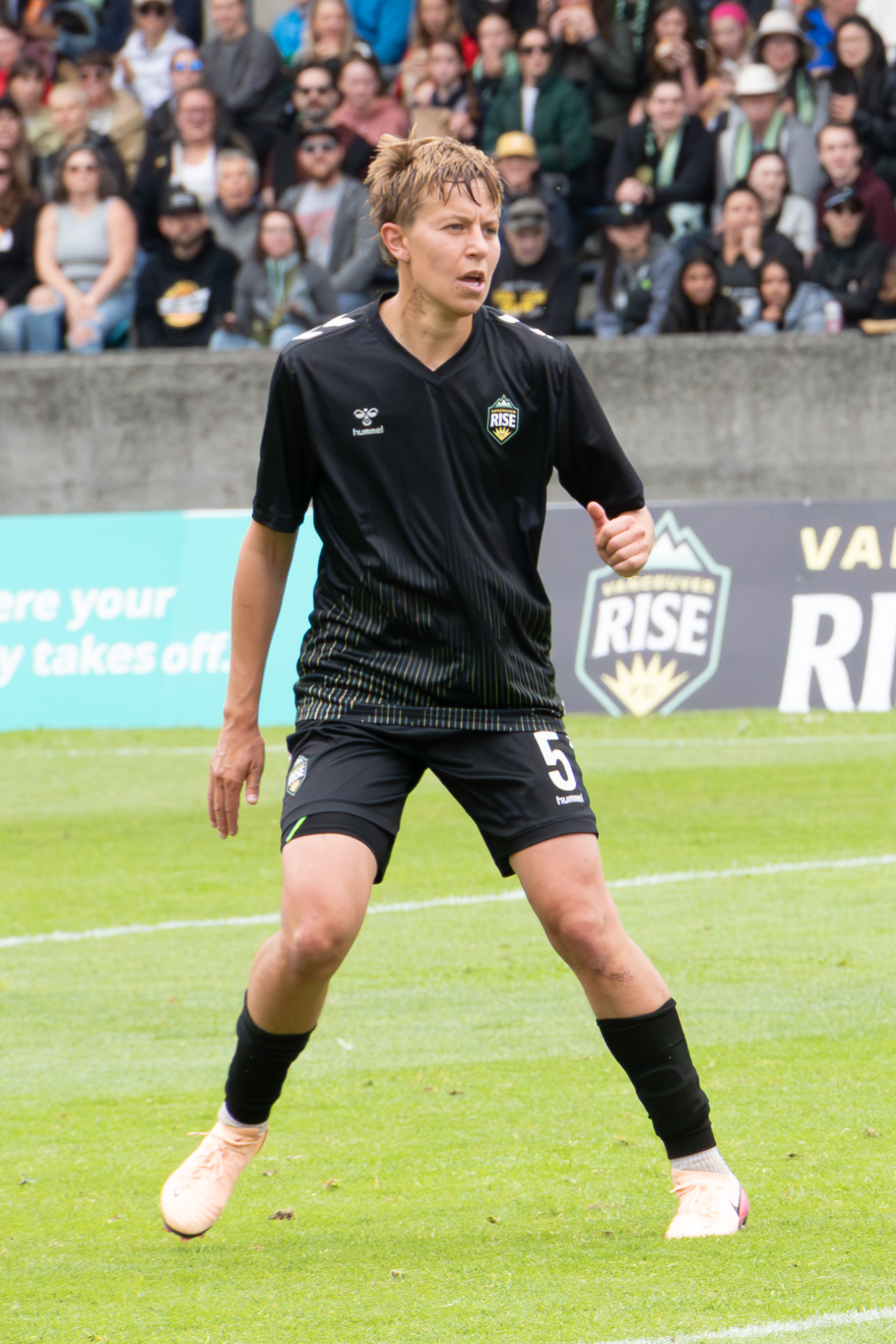
- Quinn playing for Vancouver Rise FC in 2025

Personal information
- Full name: Quinn
- Date of birth: 11 August 1995 (age 31)
- Place of birth: Toronto, Ontario, Canada
- Height: 1.77 m (5 ft 10 in)
- Position: Midfielder

Team information
- Current team: Vancouver Rise
- Number: 5

Youth career
- North Toronto SC
- Richmond Hill SC
- Wexford SC
- Erin Mills Eagles SC

College career
| Years | Team | Apps | (Gls) |
| 2013–2017 | Duke Blue Devils | 69 | (8) |

Senior career*
| Years | Team | Apps | (Gls) |
| 2013 | Toronto Lady Lynx | 4 | (0) |
| 2018 | Washington Spirit | 17 | (0) |
| 2019 | Paris FC | 2 | (0) |
| 2019–2024 | Seattle Reign | 67 | (1) |
| 2020 | → Vittsjö GIK (loan) | 8 | (0) |
| 2025– | Vancouver Rise | 18 | (6) |

International career^{‡}
| 2012 | Canada U17 | 8 | (0) |
| 2014 | Canada U20 | 4 | (0) |
| 2015 | Canada U23 | 5 | (0) |
| 2014– | Canada | 106 | (6) |
Medal record
Women's football
Representing Canada
CONCACAF W Championship
| Runner-up | 2018 United States |
Olympic Games
| Gold medal – first place | 2020 Tokyo | Team |
| Bronze medal – third place | 2016 Rio de Janeiro | Team |
- * Club domestic league appearances and goals as of October 17, 2025 ‡ National team caps and goals as of April 8, 2025

Quinn (formerly Rebecca Quinn; born August 11, 1995) is a Canadian professional soccer player who plays as a midfielder for Vancouver Rise FC in the Northern Super League and the Canada national team. Quinn previously played professionally for Paris FC in France's top league Division 1 Féminine (D1F), Vittsjö GIK in the Swedish Damallsvenskan, as well as Washington Spirit and Seattle Reign in the NWSL. They were the first Canadian to play women's collegiate soccer at Duke University. Quinn previously represented Canada on the under-17, under-20, under-23 national teams.

In 2021, at the 2020 Tokyo Olympics, Quinn became the first out non-binary transgender athlete to compete at the Olympics, the first to medal, and the first to earn a gold medal. In 2023, Quinn became the first openly transgender and non-binary footballer at the FIFA World Cup.

== Early life ==
Quinn's father, Bill, was a collegiate rugby player and their mother, Linda, played college basketball. Raised with their three sisters in a sporting family in Toronto, Quinn began playing soccer with a club team at the age of six. An active child, they also swam, played hockey, and skied competitively. In 2010, they were selected for the under-14 provincial team and began playing for the national-level youth program.

Quinn has said: "My parents put me in dance classes: ballet, jazz, hip-hop – and I hated it. Then, it was some house league hockey. But I always had a fondness for soccer. That was No. 1."

Quinn attended Havergal College, an independent school where they played varsity volleyball and basketball and earned academic honours all four years. Quinn won the Conference of Independent Schools of Ontario Athletic Association (CISAA) Championship in 2011 for volleyball. They were named Most Valuable Player (MVP) for the basketball team in 2010–11 and helped lead the team to the CISAA Championship in 2009 and 2012. During high school, Quinn was also Senior Class Prefect and Co-Head of the Sports Council. During their senior year, Quinn earned the school's Suzanne Curtis Memorial Trophy and was named Athlete of the Year.

Quinn played soccer for the Erin Mills Eagles Soccer Club U-15 and U-16 teams and helped the team win the Ontario Provincial championship in 2010 and 2011 and the Canadian National U-16 Club Championship in 2011. The team won silver in 2012.

== College career ==
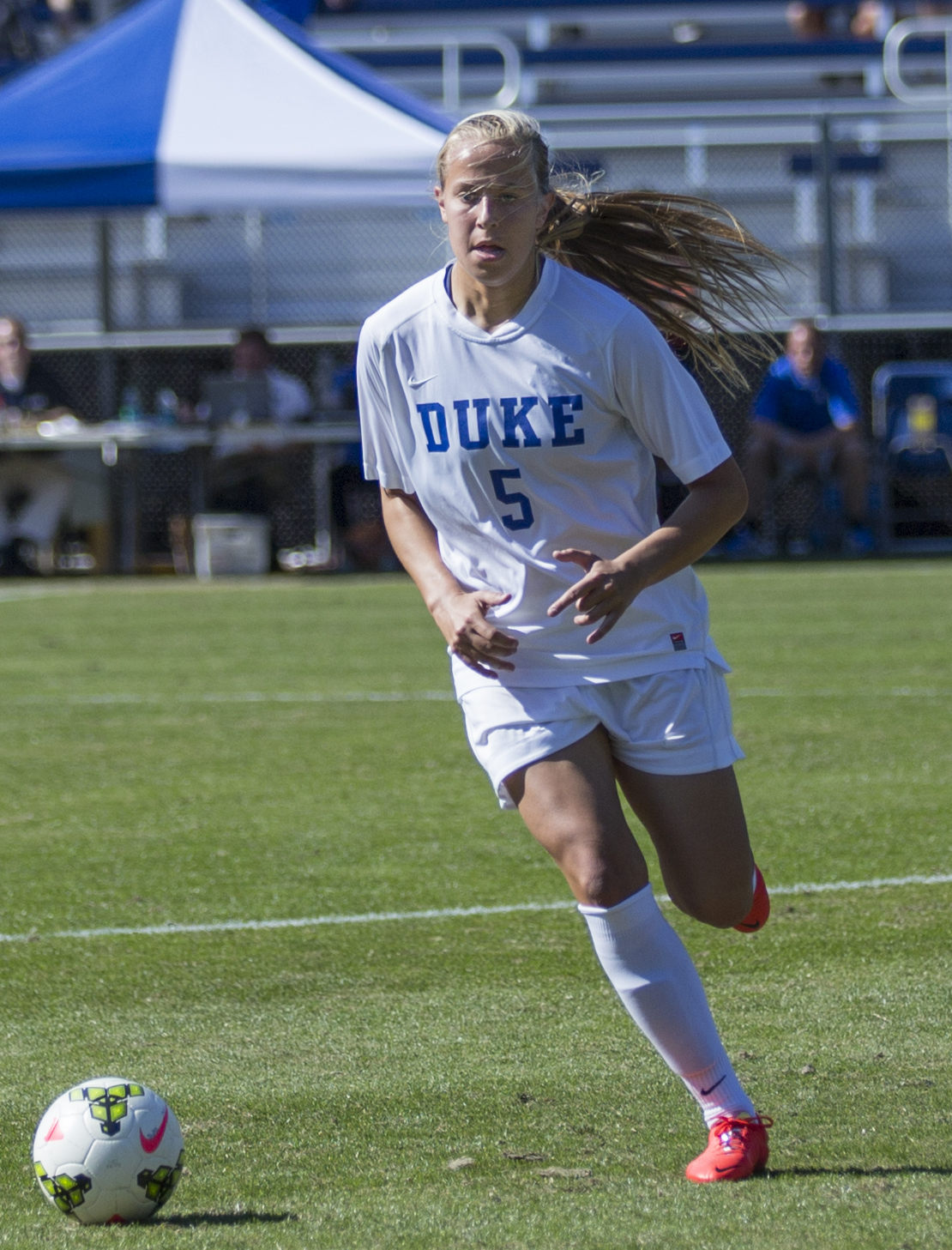
Quinn during a Duke Blue Devils match against Boston College Eagles, 2014

Quinn attended Duke University, where they played collegiate soccer for the Duke Blue Devils from 2013 to 2018 and majored in biology. They were the first Canadian to play for Duke's women's soccer team.

During their freshman season, Quinn started in four of the seven matches they played. They missed eight games after being injured early in the season. They recorded an assist against the Boston College Eagles. The following season, Quinn was a starting midfielder in 12 of the 14 games they played. They scored two goals during the season, including one game-winner. Despite missing four games due to injury, Quinn recorded 1,060 minutes of play their sophomore season. As a junior, Quinn was a starting defender in 20 of the 22 games they played and logged 1,974 minutes despite missing three games due to an ankle injury. The defensive line's 14 shutouts ranked first in the ACC and seventh in the nation. During a match against Florida in the NCAA Sweet 16, Quinn scored an equalizing header goal to tie the match 1–1. After winning the match 2–1, Duke advanced to the NCAA Cup quarterfinals. Quinn played in four matches in 2016 due to competing at the 2016 Rio Olympics with the national team and injuries.

As a redshirt senior in 2017, Quinn earned Atlantic Coast Conference (ACC) Midfielder of the Year honors (the first Duke player to do so) and was a Hermann Trophy semifinalist. The same year, they were named All-ACC First Team and United Soccer Coaches First Team All-American.

== Club career ==
=== Washington Spirit ===
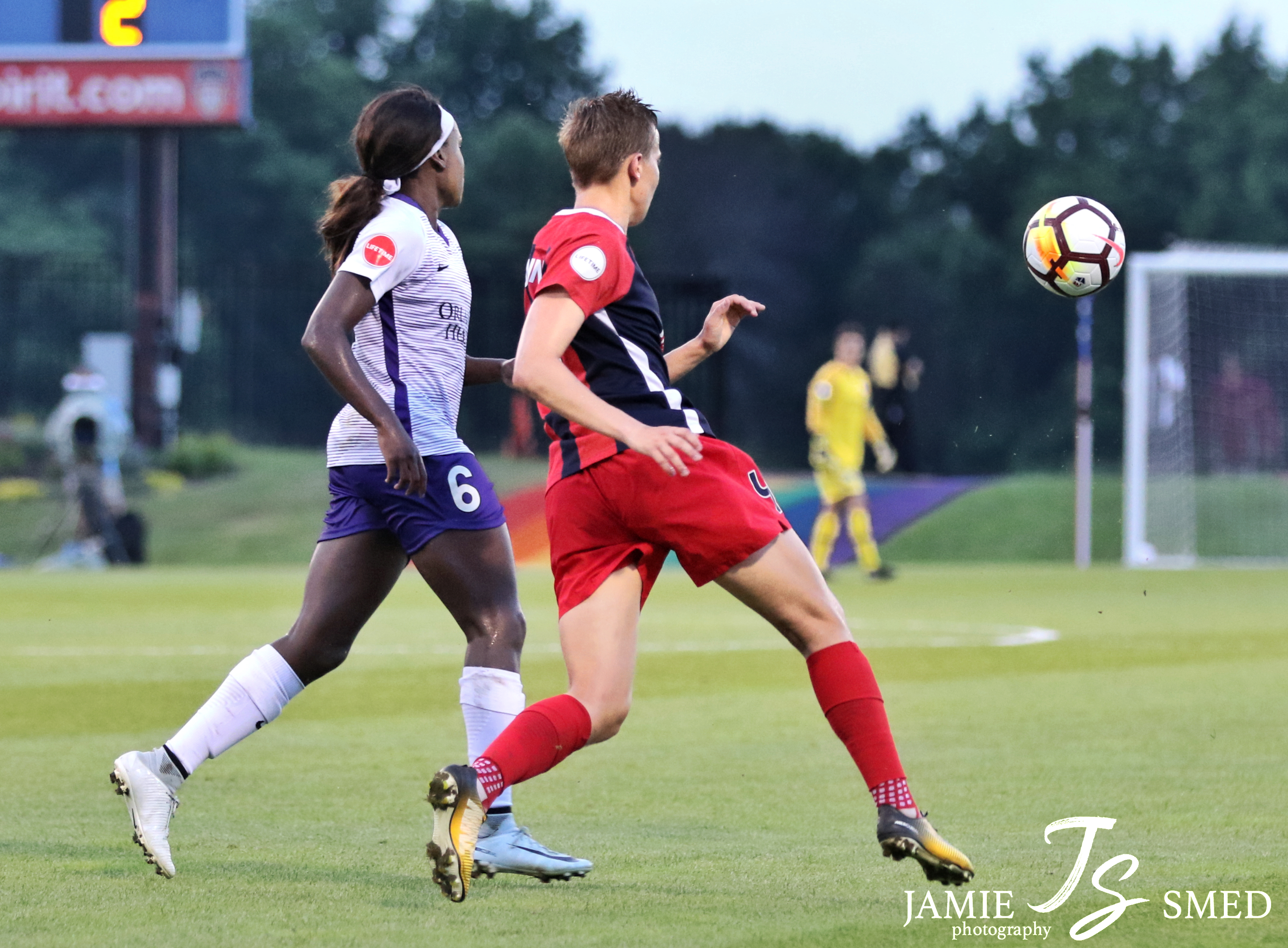
Quinn (right) clears the ball from Orlando Pride forward Chioma Ubogagu, 24 June 2018

Quinn became the highest drafted Canadian in NWSL history when they were selected third overall by the Washington Spirit in the 2018 NWSL College Draft. During the 2018 season, Quinn started in 16 of the 17 matches they played and recorded 1,385 minutes their rookie season. The Spirit finished in eighth place with a 2–17–5 record.

=== Paris FC ===
Wanting to play in Europe ahead of the 2019 FIFA Women's World Cup in France, Quinn signed with Division 1 Féminine (D1F) club Paris FC. They made their debut for Paris FC during a 1–0 against Guingamp on 16 February. Quinn played in two matches for Paris during the 2018–19 D1F season while also competing for Canada at the Algarve Cup and multiple training camps ahead of the World Cup. The club finished in fifth place with a 9–8–5 record.

=== Reign FC ===
In July 2019 (following the FIFA Women's World Cup in France), Quinn returned to the NWSL in the United States and signed with Reign FC based in Tacoma, Washington. Quinn made their debut for the Reign on 11 August in a 3–1 loss to Utah Royals FC. Quinn competed in six matches during the 2019 season for a total of 357 minutes. The club finished in fourth place with a 10–6–8 record and earned a berth to the NWSL Playoffs They were defeated 4–1 by eventual champions North Carolina Courage during the semifinal.

In 2020, Quinn played 203 minutes for the Reign in the NWSL Challenge Cup, including two starts. They were part of the squad which won the 2022 NWSL Shield. Upon completion of the 2022 season, OL Reign announced that Quinn had signed a new two-year contract with the club, keeping them with the club until the 2024 season.

On May 27, 2023, Quinn scored their first NWSL career goal in a 4–1 victory against Angel City FC.

In December 2024, Seattle Reign announced in their end-of-season roster statement that Quinn would be eligible for free agency as they were to be out of contract at the end of the NWSL season, bringing their time at the club to an end.

==== Vittsjö (loan) ====
In August 2020, it was announced Quinn was loaned to Swedish club, Vittsjö GIK for the 2020 Damallsvenskan. They played 660 minutes in eight matches for Vittsjö helping the club finish in fifth place despite the emergence of the COVID-19 pandemic.

=== Vancouver Rise FC ===
In January 2025, it was announced that Quinn would join Northern Super League team Vancouver Rise FC. Quinn scored the first goal in Northern Super League history against the Calgary Wild FC in the inaugural game of the league. They were named as the NSL's Player of the Month for September 2025. On November 15, 2025, they started in the inaugural NSL final, being substituted off due to injury in the 36th minute as the Rise won a 2–1 victory over AFC Toronto to claim the 2025 Diana B. Matheson Cup.

On April 16, 2026, Quinn was named as team captain, alongside Shannon Woeller, for the 2026 season. They scored their first goal of the season, the winning goal in the Rise's first win of the 2026 NSL season, on May 18, 2026, in a 2–1 victory against Halifax Tides FC.

== International career ==
Quinn has represented Canada on the senior, under-23 under-20 and under-17 national teams.

=== Youth ===
Quinn won a silver medal at the 2012 CONCACAF Women's U-17 Championship in Guatemala and competed at the 2012 FIFA U-17 Women's World Cup, 2014 FIFA U-20 Women's World Cup and 2015 Pan American Games.

=== Senior ===
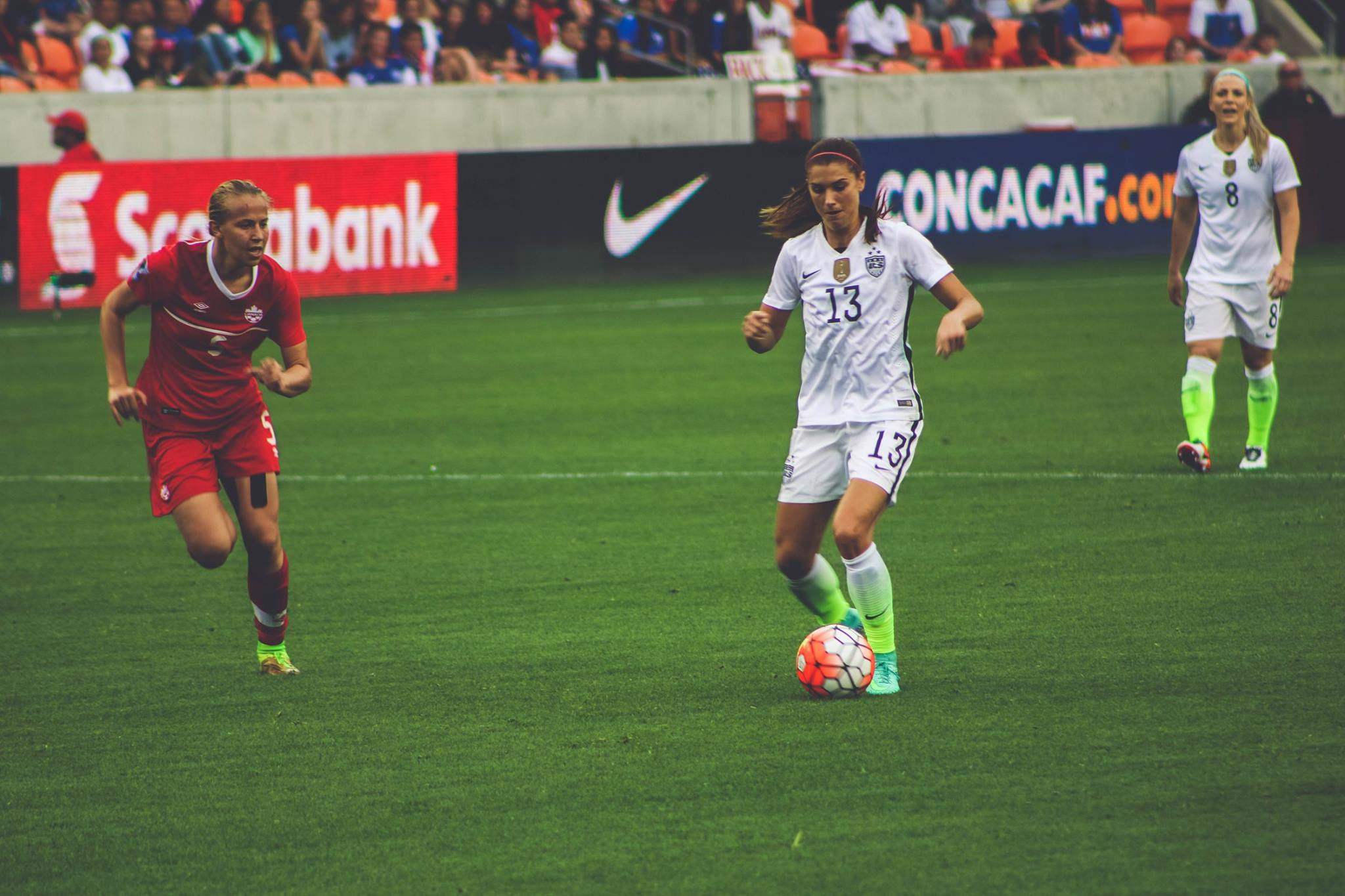
Quinn (left) defends against Alex Morgan during the 2016 CONCACAF Women's Olympic Qualifying Championship Final on 21 February 2016

On March 7, 2014 at the age of 18, Quinn made their senior national team debut in a 3–1 win against Italy in the 2014 Cyprus Cup. On February 16, 2016, they scored a hat-trick against Guatemala in a 10–0 win in the group stage of the 2016 CONCACAF Women's Olympic Qualifying Championship.

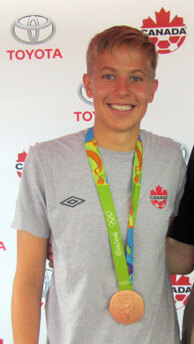
Quinn with 2016 Olympics bronze medal in 2018

In June 2016, while still playing collegiate soccer for Duke, Quinn was named to the roster for the 2016 Summer Olympics where Canada won bronze. During the team's first match of the tournament, Quinn subbed in the 23rd minute helping Canada shutout Australia with a 2–0 win. They were in the starting lineup as a midfielder during the team's next group stage match against Zimbabwe resulting in a 3–1 win. During the team's first-ever win against two-time FIFA Women's World Cup champions Germany, Quinn provided the assist to Melissa Tancredi's second goal resulting in a 2–1 win for Team Canada. Finishing in first place in Group F with an undefeated nine points, Canada advanced to the quarterfinals where they defeated France 1–0. Quinn subbed in during the 81st minute to strengthen Canada's defence and maintain the shutout. Canada faced Germany for the second time in the semifinals and were defeated 2–0. Quinn was an unused substitute during the match. The team faced Brazil for the bronze medal match and won 2–1 marking the second time the national team medalled at the Olympics (both bronze and previously won in 2012).

In March 2017, Quinn competed with Team Canada at the 2017 Algarve Cup in Portugal. They were a starting player during the team's 2–1 win against Russia. Quinn was a starting midfielder for the final match against Spain where Canada narrowly lost 1–0.

In September 2018, Quinn was named to the roster for the 2018 CONCACAF Women's Championship, the qualifying tournament for the 2019 FIFA Women's World Cup in France. During the team's second group stage match, Quinn was a starting midfielder and scored a goal in the 56th minute helping Canada win 12–0 against Cuba. Quinn started as a centre back during the third group stage match helping Canada win 3–1 to finish first in Group B and advance to the semifinals. Quinn scored a goal in the 7–0 semifinal win against Panama. The win earned Canada a spot at the 2019 FIFA Women's World Cup and advanced the team to the final match against defending Women's World Cup champions, the United States. Quinn played every minute of the final match, though Canada lost 2–0. Quinn was named to the Best XI at the 2018 CONCACAF Awards for their performance between 1 January and 10 December 2018.

In May 2019, Quinn was named to the roster for the 2019 FIFA Women's World Cup. They made their debut during the team's second group stage match, a 2–0 win against New Zealand on 15 June. Canada finished second in Group E with two wins and a 2–1 loss against the Netherlands and advanced to the Round of 16. Quinn was a substitute for forward Janine Beckie in the 84th minute of Team Canada's 1–0 loss to Sweden.

In January 2020, Quinn was named to the Canadian roster for the 2020 CONCACAF Women's Olympic Qualifying Championship (also known as the Gold Cup) where the top two teams secure entry to the 2020 Summer Olympics. During the team's first group stage match, Quinn subbed into the right midfielder position in the 62nd minute and helped the Canada win 11–0. Their next appearance during the tournament came in the third group stage match against Mexico — a 2–0 win. Canada finished in first place for Group B after going undefeated in all three matches. After defeating Costa Rica 1–0 in the semi-final and securing a post at the Olympics, During the final against the United States, Quinn was a starting midfielder. Canada lost 3–0.

After the Olympics were delayed due to the COVID-19 pandemic, Quinn was named to the 18–player roster for the 2020 Tokyo Olympics in June 2021 by head coach Bev Priestman. Quinn played 72 minutes of the team's first group stage match against hosts Japan which resulted in a 1–1 draw and became the first openly transgender as well as first non-binary athlete to compete at the tournament. Of the historic moment, they said, "I feel proud seeing 'Quinn' up on the lineup and on my accreditation. I feel sad knowing there were Olympians before me unable to live their truth because of this world. I feel optimistic for change. Change in legislature, Changes in rules, structures, and mindsets." Quinn played 29 minutes of Canada's second group stage match against Chile helping the team win 2–1. After tying Great Britain 1–1 with Quinn playing as a starting midfielder, Canada finished second in Group E and advanced to the quarterfinals. Quinn was a starting midfielder in the match against Brazil. After neither team scored after 120 minutes of play, Canada won on penalty kicks 4–3. Quinn was a starting midfielder for the semi-final against the United States and played 60 minutes of Canada's 1–0 win. The win marked the first time Canada had defeated the United States in over 20 years. Quinn was a starting midfielder in the final against Sweden and played the entire first half. Canada won their first Olympic gold medal after defeating Sweden in penalty kicks after a 1–1 draw. With the win, Quinn became the first out, transgender, and non-binary gold medalist in Olympic history.

Quinn started in the final of the 2022 CONCACAF W Championship, where Canada won silver and qualified for the 2023 FIFA Women's World Cup in Australia and New Zealand.

On March 9, 2023, Quinn spoke before the House of Commons Standing Committee on Canadian Heritage alongside teammates Christine Sinclair, Sophie Schmidt, and Janine Sonis, criticizing Canada Soccer's distribution of resources across programs which they testified were "invariably favouring the men’s program."

The 2023 FIFA Women's World Cup proved to be a major disappointment for Canada, who failed to advance past the group stage. Quinn played for almost the entirety of the team's three matches, only being substituted in the closing minutes of their 4–0 loss to Australia in order to give newcomer Olivia Smith an appearance. Their performance was generally praised.

Quinn was called up to the Canada squad for the 2024 CONCACAF W Gold Cup, which Canada finished as semifinalists. On March 6, 2024 they came off the bench in Canada's semifinal defeat to the United States, earning their 100th cap for Canada.

Quinn was called up to the Canada squad for the 2024 Summer Olympics. They started in 3 matches and played as a substitute once during Canada's run in the tournament. Quinn converted their penalty kick in Canada's 0-0 (4-2 penalties) loss on penalties to Germany in the quarterfinals stage.

== Personal life ==
In 2020, Quinn came out as non-binary and transgender (using gender-neutral pronouns) and changed their name by adopting their prior surname as a mononym. They were permitted to continue playing professional women's soccer on the basis of their sex assigned at birth, rather than gender identity. They have expressed disappointment with media using their birth name when they came out, stating "it's crucial to write about trans people using their name & pronouns." In July 2021, Quinn became the first out non-binary transgender athlete to compete and become an Olympic Champion at an Olympic Games.

In 2023, Quinn became the first openly transgender and non-binary footballer at the FIFA World Cup.

On April 25, 2026, as part of the Goldeneyes' Pride night, Quinn performed the ceremonial puck drop at the match between the Vancouver Goldeneyes and the Minnesota Frost.

== Career statistics ==
Goals scored in international matches
| Goal | Date | Location | Opponent | Score | Result | Competition |
|---|---|---|---|---|---|---|
| 1 | February 16, 2016 | BBVA Compass Stadium | Guatemala | 5–0 | 10–0 | CONCACAF Women's Olympic Qualifier |
| 2 | February 16, 2016 | BBVA Compass Stadium | Guatemala | 6–0 | 10–0 | CONCACAF Women's Olympic Qualifier |
| 3 | February 16, 2016 | BBVA Compass Stadium | Guatemala | 7–0 | 10–0 | CONCACAF Women's Olympic Qualifier |
| 4 | October 8, 2018 | H-E-B Park, Edinburg | Cuba | 8–0 | 12–0 | 2018 CONCACAF Women's Championship |
| 5 | October 14, 2018 | Toyota Stadium, Frisco | Panama | 5–0 | 7–0 | 2018 CONCACAF Women's Championship Semi-final |
| 5 | December 5, 2023 | Christine Sinclair Place, Vancouver | Australia | 1–0 | 1–0 | International friendly |

== Honours ==
Canada

- Summer Olympics: 2021; bronze medal 2016
- Algarve Cup: 2016
- Four Nations Tournament: 2015

Seattle Reign FC

- NWSL Shield: 2022
- The Women's Cup: 2022

Vancouver Rise FC

- Diana B. Matheson Cup: 2025

Individual

- CONCACAF Awards Best XI: 2018
- Atlantic Coast Conference Midfielder of the Year: 2017

== See also ==
- List of women's footballers with 100 or more international caps
- Transgender people in sports
- List of Olympic medalists in football
- List of 2020 Summer Olympics medal winners
- List of Seattle Reign FC players
- List of Canadian sports personalities
- List of LGBTQ sportspeople
- List of LGBTQ Olympians and Paralympians
- List of NCAA Division I women's soccer First-Team All-America teams
- List of legally mononymous people
- List of people from Toronto
