= Kirstin Tynan =

Canadian soccer player (born 2002)

Personal information
- Date of birth: March 11, 2002 (age 24)
- Place of birth: Vancouver, British Columbia, Canada
- Height: 5 ft 8 in (1.73 m)
- Position: Goalkeeper

Team information
- Current team: Halifax Tides FC (on loan from Vancouver Rise FC)
- Number: 1

Youth career
- Mountain United FC
- North Shore Girls SC

College career
Years	Team	Apps	(Gls)
2021–2024	Queen's Golden Gaels	58	(0)

Senior career*
Years	Team	Apps	(Gls)
2022–2024	TSS FC Rovers	13+	(0)
2025–	Vancouver Rise FC	2	(0)
2025–2026	→ Vancouver Rise FC Academy	1	(0)
2026–	→ Halifax Tides FC (loan)	0	(0)
- * Club domestic league appearances and goals as of August 12, 2026

Kirstin Tynan (born March 11, 2002) is a Canadian soccer player who plays for Halifax Tides FC in the Northern Super League, on loan from Vancouver Rise FC.

== Early life ==
Tynan played youth soccer with Mountain United FC and North Shore Girls SC.

== University career ==
In 2020, Tynan began attending Queen's University, where she played for the women's soccer team (beginning in 2021 as the 2020 season was cancelled due to the COVID-19 pandemic). During her third year, while studying abroad in England, she trained with Women's Super League club Everton. In 2023, she was named an OUA East First Team All-Star and a U Sports Second Team All-Canadian. In September 2024, she was named the OUA Athlete of the Week.

== Club career ==
From 2022 to 2024, Tynan played with TSS FC Rovers in League1 British Columbia, captaining the side in 2024 and being named the supporters' group Women’s Player of the Year.

In January 2025, Tynan signed with Vancouver Rise FC of the Northern Super League. On August 2, 2025, she made her professional debut, in a 3-3 draw against Ottawa Rapid FC. In August 2026, she was loaned to Halifax Tides FC for the remainder of the season.

== Career statistics ==
As of October 24, 2025

Club	Season	League			Playoffs		Domestic Cup		Continental		Total	
Club	Season	Division	Apps	Goals	Apps	Goals	Apps	Goals	Apps	Goals	Apps	Goals
TSS FC Rovers	2023	League1 British Columbia	3	0	0	0	—		—		3	0
TSS FC Rovers	2024	League1 British Columbia	10	0	1	0	—		—		9	5
TSS FC Rovers	Total		13	0	1	0	0	0	0	0	14	0
Vancouver Rise FC	2025	Northern Super League	1	0	0	0	—		—		1	0
Vancouver Rise FC Academy (loan)	2025	League1 British Columbia	0	0	—		—		1	0	1	0
Career total			14	0	1	0	0	0	1	0	16	0
