= Yuka Okamoto =

Japanese footballer (born 1997)

Yuka Okamoto 岡本 祐花
Personal information
- Date of birth: 20 September 1997 (age 29)
- Place of birth: Tokyo, Japan
- Height: 1.68 m (5 ft 6 in)
- Positions: Midfielder; defender

Team information
- Current team: Vancouver Rise FC

Senior career*
Years	Team	Apps	(Gls)
2016	Nippon Sport Science University Fields Yokohama	2	(0)
2018	Nippon Sport Science University Fields Yokohama	0	(0)
2020–2025	AC Nagano Parceiro Ladies	98	(1)
2025–	Vancouver Rise FC	13	(0)
- * Club domestic league appearances and goals as of 17 October 2025

Yuka Okamoto (岡本 祐花; born 20 September 1997) is a Japanese professional footballer who plays as a defender for Northern Super League club Vancouver Rise FC.

== Early life ==
Okamoto began playing football at age seven and grew up playing with Shudo Junior High School and Shudo High School.

== Club career ==
In 2016, Okamoto began her senior career with Nippon Sport Science University Fields Yokohama in the Nadeshiko League.

In January 2020, Okamoto signed with AC Nagano Parceiro Ladies in the second tier Nadeshiko League Division 2. The next season, she began playing in the newly formed professional first tier WE League with the club. On 21 September 2024, she scored her first league goal for the club, in a league match against JEF United Chiba Ladies. In May 2025, she announced her departure from the club, in order to pursue a playing opportunity outside of Japan. At the time of her departure, she had played every minute in 63 consecutive matches, dating back to the middle of the 2021-2022 season.

In July 2025, Okamoto signed with Vancouver Rise FC of the Northern Super League.

== Career statistics ==
As of 17 November 2025

Appearances and goals by club, season and competition
Club	Season	League			National cup (Note: Includes appearances in the Empress's Cup)		Other (Note: Includes appearances in the Nadeshiko League Cup)		Total	
Club	Season	Division	Apps	Goals	Apps	Goals	Apps	Goals	Apps	Goals
Nippon Sport Science University Fields Yokohama	2016	Nadeshiko League Division 2	2	0	0	0	3	0	5	0
Nippon Sport Science University Fields Yokohama	2018	Nadeshiko League Division 1	0	0	0	0	0	0	0	0
Nippon Sport Science University Fields Yokohama	Total		0	0	0	0	0	0	0	0
AC Nagano Parceiro Ladies	2020	Nadeshiko League Division 2	18	2	2	1	0	0	20	3
AC Nagano Parceiro Ladies	2021–22	WE League	16	0	1	0	0	0	17	0
AC Nagano Parceiro Ladies	2022–23	WE League	20	0	1	0	5	1	26	1
AC Nagano Parceiro Ladies	2023–24	WE League	22	0	1	0	5	0	28	0
AC Nagano Parceiro Ladies	2024–25	WE League	22	1	1	0	4	0	27	1
AC Nagano Parceiro Ladies	Total		98	3	6	1	14	1	118	5
Vancouver Rise FC	2025	Northern Super League	13	0	—		3	0	16	0
Career total			113	3	6	1	17	1	136	5
