= Jaylyn Wright =

Canadian soccer player (born 2003)

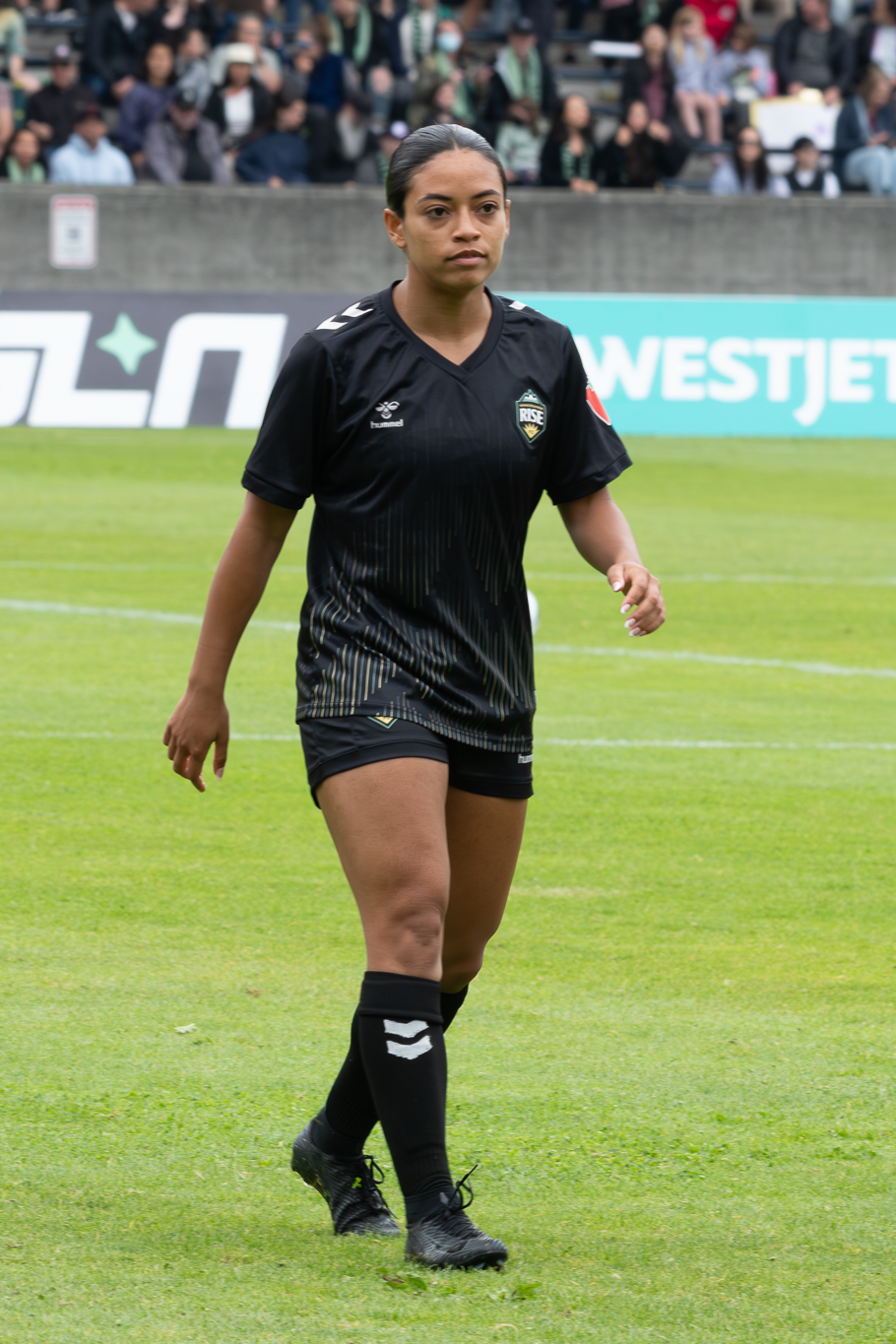
- Wright playing for Vancouver Rise FC in 2025

Personal information
- Full name: Jaylyn Kendyl Wright
- Date of birth: August 1, 2003 (age 23)
- Place of birth: Notre-Dame-de-l'Île-Perrot, Quebec, Canada
- Height: 5 ft 2 in (1.57 m)
- Position: Defender

Team information
- Current team: Vancouver Rise
- Number: 12

Youth career
- –2014: Lakeshore SC
- 2015–2016: CS St-Laurent
- 2017–2019: Lakeshore SC

College career
Years	Team	Apps	(Gls)
2021–2022	Fresno State Bulldogs	35	(3)
2023–2024	Utah Valley Wolverines	31	(0)

Senior career*
Years	Team	Apps	(Gls)
2022–2024	CS Mont-Royal Outremont	10+	(0)
2025–	Vancouver Rise	23	(0)
- * Club domestic league appearances and goals as of October 17, 2025

Jaylyn Kendyl Wright (born August 1, 2003) is a Canadian soccer player who currently plays for Vancouver Rise FC in the Northern Super League.

== Early life ==
Wright played youth soccer with Lakeshore SC and also played with the Quebec provincial team from 2017 to 2019.

== College career ==
In 2021, Wright began attending California State University, Fresno, where she played for the women's soccer team. On September 19, 2021, she scored her first goal in a 1-1 draw with the Sacramento State Hornets.

In 2023, she transferred to Utah Valley University, where she joined the women's soccer team. She was named the WAC All-Academic Team both years.

== Club career ==
In 2025, she signed with Vancouver Rise in the Northern Super League, ahead of the inaugural 2025 season.

== International career ==
In 2019, she attended two training camps with the Canada U17 team.
