= Jaime Perrault =

Canadian soccer player (born 2006)

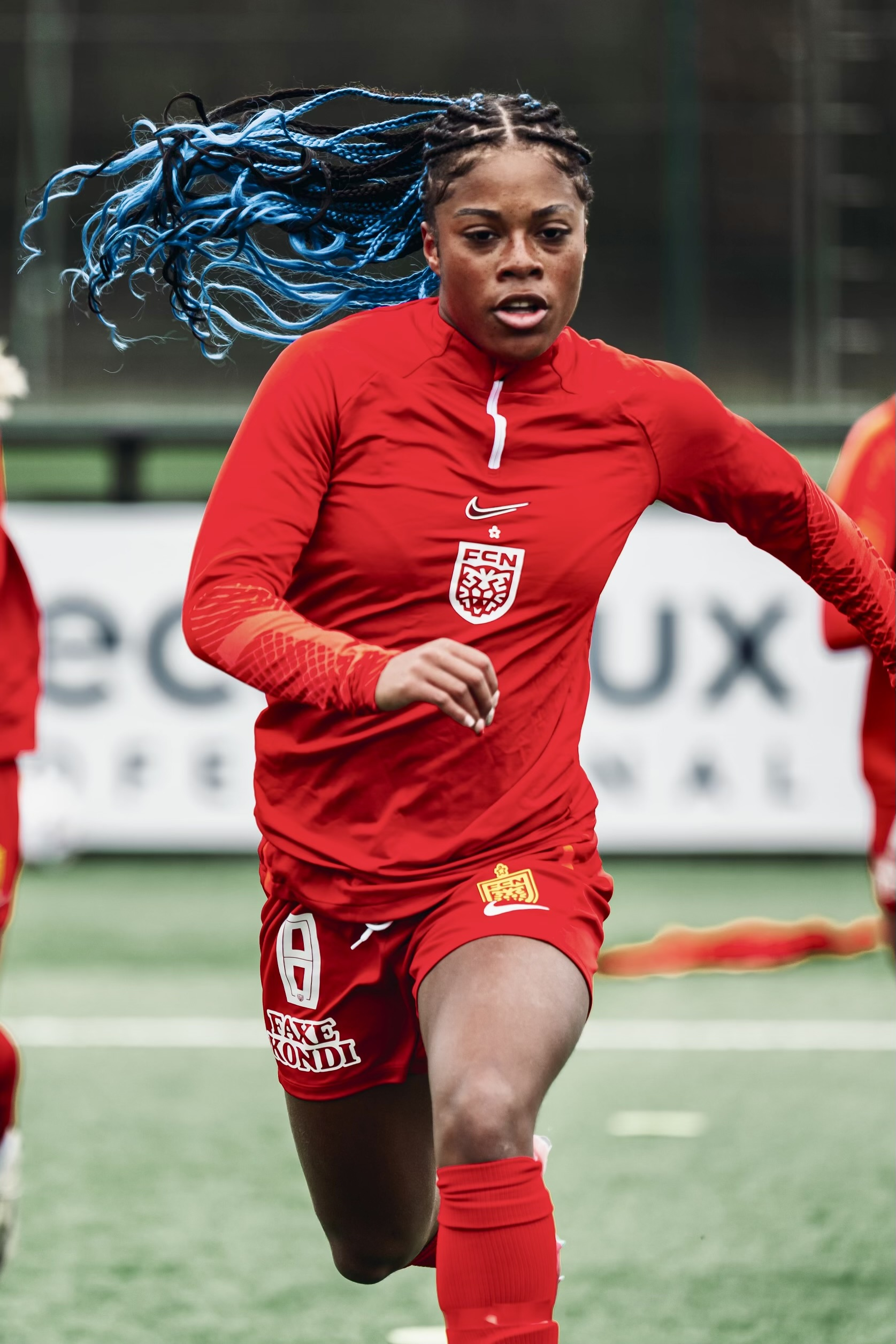
- Jaime Perrault in 2025

Personal information
- Full name: Jaime Quanita Perrault
- Date of birth: August 8, 2006 (age 20)
- Place of birth: Memphis, Tennessee, United States
- Positions: Forward; full-back

Team information
- Current team: Vancouver Rise
- Number: 28

Youth career
- West Coast Soccer
- 2015–2019: Coastal FC
- 2019–2024: Whitecaps FC Girls Elite

Senior career*
Years	Team	Apps	(Gls)
2023–2024	Whitecaps FC Girls Elite	21	(8)
2025	FC Nordsjælland	8	(0)
2025–	Vancouver Rise	0	(0)
2025–	→ Vancouver Rise Academy	0	(0)

International career^{‡}
2021–2022	Canada U17	11	(1)
2023–2024	Canada U20	7	(1)
- * Club domestic league appearances and goals as of September 1, 2025 ‡ National team caps and goals as of September 3, 2024

Jaime Quanita Perrault (born August 8, 2006) is a Canadian soccer player who plays as a forward for Northern Super League club Vancouver Rise FC.

== Early life and background ==
Perrault was born in Memphis, Tennessee, before being adopted as an infant and moving to Pitt Meadows, British Columbia in Canada. She began playing soccer at age five with West Coast Soccer, later joining Coastal FC. In August 2019, she joined the Whitecaps FC Girls Elite.

In 2023, she had committed to attend Texas A&M University to play for the women's soccer team in the fall of 2024.

== Club career ==
Perrault played with Whitecaps FC Girls Elite in League1 British Columbia, helping them win back-to-back League1 British Columbia titles in 2023 and 2024.

In January 2025, Perrault signed with Danish club FC Nordsjælland in the Kvindeliga.

In September 2025, she signed with Vancouver Rise FC in the Northern Super League.

== International career ==
In December 2021, Perrault debuted in the Canada national program, attending a camp in Mexico with the Canada U17. She won a bronze medal at the 2022 CONCACAF Women's U-17 Championship and was later named to the team for the 2022 FIFA U-17 Women's World Cup.

In 2024, she was named to the Canada U20 for the 2024 FIFA U-20 Women's World Cup.
