= Audrey François =

Canadian soccer player (born 2004)

Personal information
- Full name: Audrey Chelsie François
- Date of birth: January 1, 2004 (age 22)
- Place of birth: Montreal, Quebec, Canada
- Height: 1.68 m (5 ft 6 in)
- Position: Midfielder

Team information
- Current team: Vancouver Rise FC

Youth career
- CS Monteuil
- PEF Quebec

College career
Years	Team	Apps	(Gls)
2022–2025	Harvard Crimson	65	(8)

Senior career*
Years	Team	Apps	(Gls)
2021–2022	AS Laval	14	(7)
2026–	Vancouver Rise FC	1	(0)

International career
2018	Canada U15		
2017	Canada U17		
2018	Canada U20		
- * Club domestic league appearances and goals as of July 30, 2026

Audrey Chelsie François (born January 1, 2004) is a Canadian soccer player who plays for Vancouver Rise FC in the Northern Super League.

== Early life ==
François began playing youth soccer at age seven with CS Monteuil. She later joined the PEF Quebec program in 2016, also joining the Quebec provincial team.

== College career ==
In 2022, François began attending Harvard University, where she played for the women's soccer team. On September 2, 2022, she scored her first goal in a 4–0 victory over the UNC Greensboro Spartans. During her freshman season, she was named the Ivy League Rookie of the Week twice. In 2024, she was named an All-Ivy League Honourable Mention. She was named an CSC Academic All-District in both 2024 and 2025.

== Club career ==
In January 2026, François signed with Northern Super League club Vancouver Rise FC.

== International career ==
Born in Canada, François is of Haitian descent through her parents – her father being born in Torbeck and her mother in Saint-Marc. She was called up to the Canadian program for the first time at age 13 for a camp with the Canada U15 team. She was then named to the squad for the 2018 CONCACAF Girls' U-15 Championship. She played with the Canada U17 during a tour in China in 2017. In April 2024, she was called up to the Canada U20 for a pair of friendlies.

In October 2026, François was called up to the Haiti national team.
