= Vancouver Rise FC =

Women's soccer club in Vancouver, British Columbia

- Founded: December 2022; 3 years ago
- Ground: Swangard Stadium; Burnaby, British Columbia
- Capacity: 4,500 (Note: Plus bleacher seats.)
- Owners: Greg Kerfoot (majority); Christine Sinclair
- President: Aditi Bhatt (interim)
- Head coach: Iain Darbyshire (interim)
- League: Northern Super League
- 2026: Regular season, 4th Playoffs, semi-finalist
- Website: vanrisefc.com
Home colours	Away colours

Vancouver Rise FC is a professional women's soccer club based in Vancouver, British Columbia, that competes in the Northern Super League, in the top flight of the Canadian soccer league system. Majority-owned by Vancouver Whitecaps FC co-owner Greg Kerfoot, the club is led by Sinead King, and managed by Stephanie Labbé. Its colours are teal, black, and gold, while its crest depicts the North Shore Mountains. Its home games are played at Swangard Stadium in Burnaby.

Alongside the Calgary Wild, the Rise were one of the first two clubs to join the Northern Super League, and are a spiritual successor to the Whitecaps' former women's team. The club was co-developed with the league itself, in an effort to retain female players from the Whitecaps' academy team, and provide equity between the organization's men's and women's programs. It played its first season in 2025, as one of the league's six charter members, winning the inaugural Diana B. Matheson Cup.

== History ==
Vancouver Whitecaps FC, a club with a long history in Vancouver, first organized an amateur women's team that played twelve seasons in the USL W-League between 2001 and 2012. The team enjoyed consistent success, regularly topping the league's western conference, and winning two USLW titles in 2004 and 2006. The establishment of the Women's Professional Soccer league in the United States led to difficulties in retaining players however, and the Whitecaps ultimately folded the team. A Canada Soccer REX academy for women's soccer operated by the Whitecaps was later set up in 2015, with explorations into entering the National Women's Soccer League as an expansion franchise being undertaken in 2017 and 2018.

Unsuccessful negotiations with the NWSL, an expansion of the academy, and an entry into the semi-professional League1 British Columbia in 2022, provided an impetus for the Whitecaps to help establish a professional women's league in Canada as a way to retain elite female players trained in the academy. Greg Kerfoot, the Whitecaps' co-owner, also sought to prioritize equity between the organization's men's and women's programs by offering its female players a professional pathway. In December 2022, the Whitecaps and Calgary Foothills FC acquired the first two licences to run clubs in the Northern Super League, then tentatively known as Project Eight – a league they helped foster through the Whitecaps' general manager of its women's programs, Stephanie Labbé. Labbé and Sinead King were the new club's first two executive hires, and primarily directed the club's development through its formative years; which coincided with the retirement of Burnaby native Christine Sinclair from football in 2023–24, giving Sinclair an opportunity to acquire a minority ownership in the club during her final season of play. Its name, the "Vancouver Rise", and its branding was unveiled at an event celebrating the club's launch on August 26, 2024, hosted at the D/6 Bar & Lounge in Parq Vancouver.

The Rise were the final team to secure a spot in the inaugural NSL playoffs, clinching a spot after a 1–1 draw against Halifax Tides FC. Following a 2–1 victory over AFC Toronto in the inaugural NSL final on November 15, 2025, the Rise were named as the first-ever winners of the Diana B. Matheson Cup.

== Identity ==
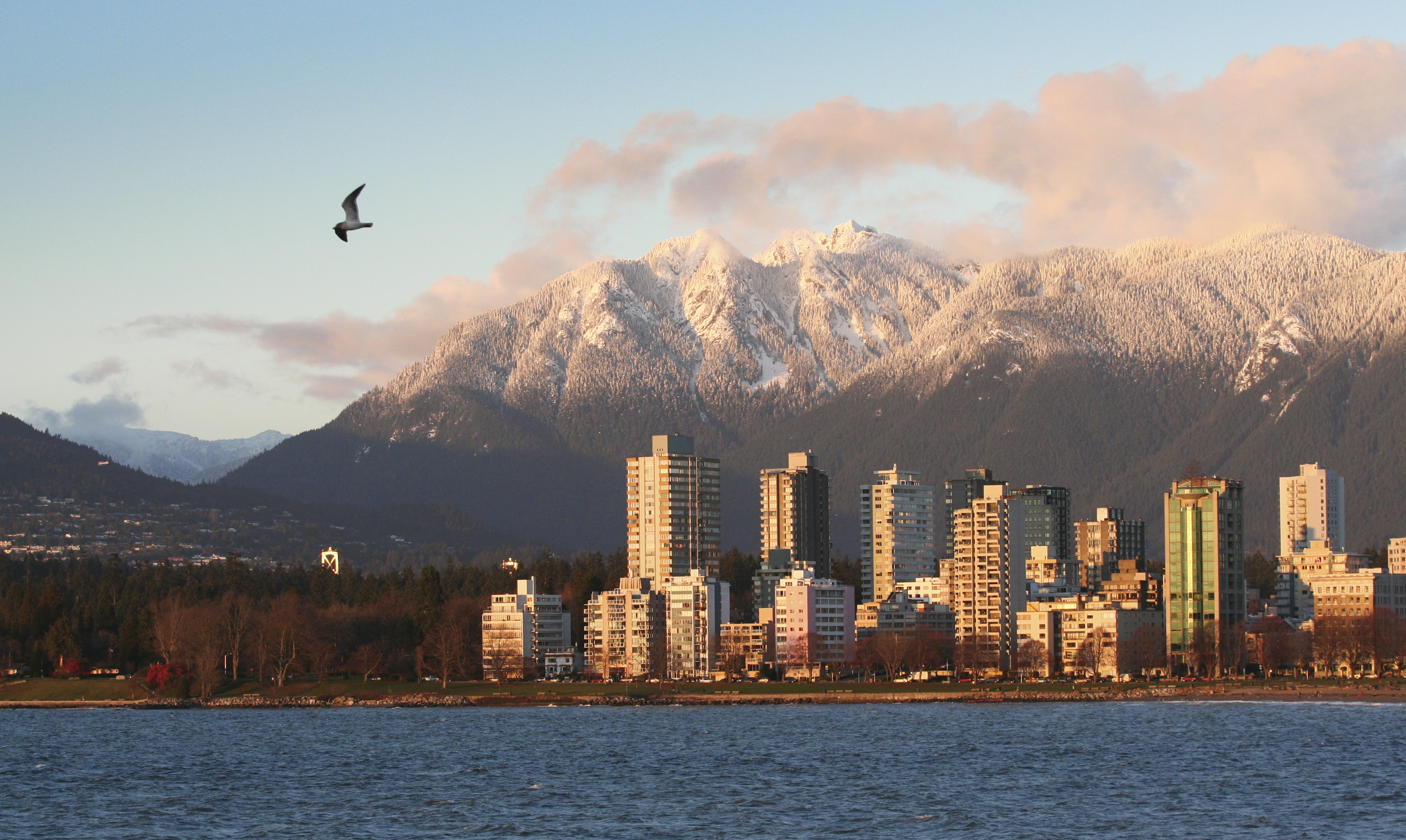
The club's crest depicts the North Shore mountains Cypress, Grouse (pictured), and Seymour.

Vancouver-based advertising agency Victory Creative Group designed the Vancouver Rise's branding, which employs the colours teal to represent the British Columbia mainland coastal forests, black to represent the Pacific Ocean, and gold to represent sunsets over the Pacific. The club name Rise is an allusion to the phrase "rise to the occasion", and is intended to evoke both "a beacon of empowerment and progress", and sunrises over the Cascade Range. Three snow-capped mountains, an allusion to the Whitecaps' crest, are illustrated atop the Rise's crest, depicting the North Shore Mountains that overlook Vancouver's skyline. In particular, they represent Cypress Mountain, Grouse Mountain, and Mount Seymour. A "bursting golden Sun" occupies the crest's base, representing the "rising stars" the club aspires to produce – its six rays referencing the charter members of the Northern Super League.

The Rise sought a relatable brand that reflected both the demographics and geography of Greater Vancouver, that "brings emotions and also has a deep tie" to the city. Along with "Vancouver Rise", the club had also registered the names "Vancouver Queens" and "Vancouver Summit" as trademarks with the Canadian Intellectual Property Office. "Vancouver Breakers", one of the names of the Whitecaps' former women's team, was also considered. The use of gold in the club's colours was encouraged by Labbé, as a reminder of the Canadian national team's gold medal-winning performance at the 2020 Olympic football tournament, of which she was a part.

== Stadium ==
The Rise play their home games at Swangard Stadium in Burnaby, the historic home ground of the Vancouver Whitecaps' predecessors. Though a tenancy at Metro Vancouver's primary sports stadium, the 54,500-capacity BC Place, has been ruled out by the club, it intends to occasionally play matches there such as their inaugural match on April 16, 2025 against Calgary Wild FC.

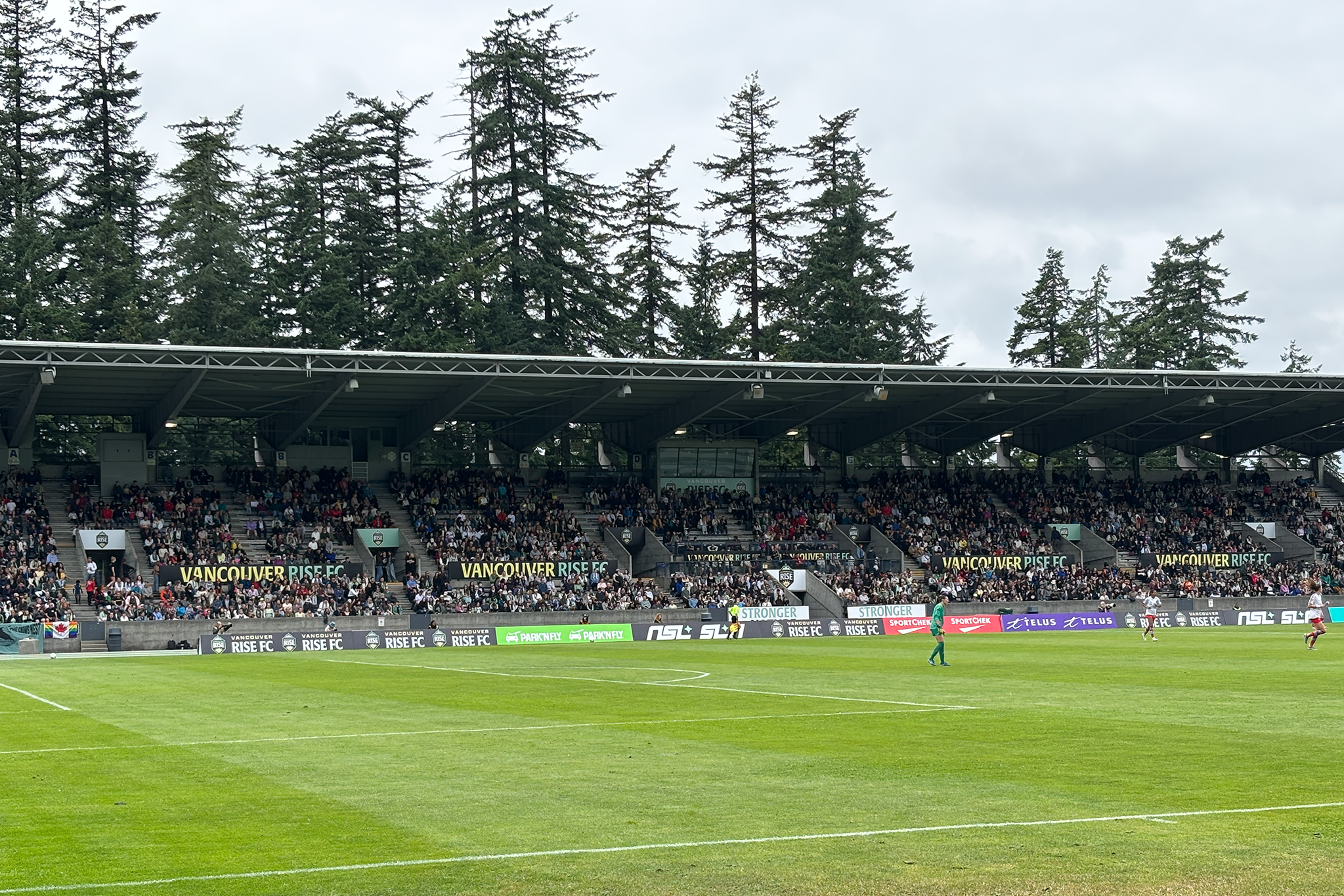
Northern Super League crowd featuring Vancouver Rise FC vs Montréal Roses

== Organization ==
Vancouver Whitecaps co-owner Greg Kerfoot holds a majority ownership in the club, though it operates with a degree of autonomy from the Whitecaps, including managing its own media relations. Alongside Kerfoot, Christine Sinclair holds a minority ownership. Former HSBC executive Sinead King serves as the club's president and chief business officer, while Stephanie Labbé, the general manager of the Whitecaps' women's programs and a former national team player, serves as the club's sporting director. In April 2025, Robyn Gayle took over as interim sporting director after Labbé went on maternity leave.

== Honours ==
Vancouver Rise FC honours
Type	Competition	Titles	Seasons
Domestic	Northern Super League	1	2025

- record

== Players and staff ==
=== Players ===
As of September 13, 2026

Note: Flags indicate national team as defined under FIFA eligibility rules; some limited exceptions apply. Players may hold more than one non-FIFA nationality.

No.	Pos.	Nation	Player
1	GK	CAN	Kirstin Tynan
2	DF	CAN	Shannon Woeller
3	DF	PHI	Jessika Cowart
4	DF	CAN	Sura Yekka
5	MF	CAN	Quinn
6	MF	AUS	Tori Tumeth
7	MF	USA	Nikki Stanton
8	FW	CAN	Alex Lamontagne
10	MF	COL	María Camila Reyes
11	FW	CAN	Jessica De Filippo
12	DF	CAN	Jaylyn Wright
13	GK	CAN	Morgan McAslan
14	MF	CAN	Anna Bout
15	DF	CAN	Ariel Young
16	DF	CAN	Kennedy Faulknor
17	FW	CAN	Audrey Francois
18	DF	JPN	Yuka Okamoto

No.	Pos.	Nation	Player
21	DF	JAM	Chantelle Swaby
22	MF	CAN	Mia Pante (on loan from Roma)
23	FW	COL	Maithé López (on loan from Angel City FC)
24	MF	WAL	Josie Longhurst
25	DF	CAN	Kaela Hansen
26	MF	ALG	Anaïs Oularbi
28	FW	CAN	Jaime Perrault
31	GK	JPN	Jessica Wulf
33	DF	CAN	Racquel Partovi (Developmental roster)
34	DF	CAN	Bridget Mutipula (Developmental roster)
38	FW	CAN	Chloe Taylor (Developmental roster)
39	FW	CAN	Lacey Kindel (Developmental roster)
45	FW	CAN	Myla Ewasiuk (Developmental roster)
46	MF	CAN	Adalyn Fairweather (Developmental roster)
59	FW	CAN	Allie Pazarka (Developmental roster)
99	FW	CAN	Latifah Abdu

Considered a domestic player as she also holds Canadian nationality

=== Current staff ===
As of April 22, 2026

Executive
Owners	Greg Kerfoot (majority); Christine Sinclair (minority)
President	Aditi Bhatt (interim)
Chief soccer officer	Robyn Gayle
Sporting director	Stephanie Labbé
Coaching staff
Head coach	Iain Darbyshire (interim)
Assistant coach	Katie Collar
Assistant coach	Iain Darbyshire
Assistant coach Goalkeeper coach	Erin McNulty
Head of performance	Joe Vecchione

=== Club captains ===
Years	Name	Nation
2025–present	Shannon Woeller	Canada
2026–present	Quinn	Canada
2026–present	Tori Tumeth	Australia

== Supporters ==
The supporters group of the Vancouver Rise is The Crow Collective. The name of the group comes from the nightly flight of crows to Burnaby, including over Swangard Stadium. The supporters gather at the southern end of the stadium.

== Team records ==
=== Year-by-year ===
Season	League											Playoffs	Continental	Average attendance (Note: Average attendance includes attendance from league matches only.)	
Season	League	Pld	W	D	L	GF	GA	GD	Pts	PPG	Pos	Playoffs	Continental	Average attendance	
2025	NSL	25	11	6	8	38	36	+2	39	1.56	3rd	Champions	Ineligible	4,245	1st
2026	NSL	25	9	4	12	47	55	-8	31	1.24	4th	Semi-Finals		3,739	2nd

1st or Winners
2nd or Runners-up
3rd
Best season or Best in league
Worst season or Worst in league

== Player records ==
=== Most career goals ===
As of November 10, 2026

#	Pos.	Name	Nation	Career at club	Goals scored			
#	Pos.	Name	Nation	Career at club	NSL	WCC	Int'l	Total
1	Forward	**Jessica De Filippo**	Canada	2025–	21	0	0	**21**
2	Forward	**Latifa Abdu**	Canada	2025–	18	0 (Note: Abdu scored in a 2026–27 W Canadian Championship match that counted toward both the tournament and regular season. The goal is reflected under NSL in this table.)	0	**18**
3	Midfielder	**Quinn**	Canada	2025–	9	0	0	**9**
4	Forward	Holly Ward	Canada	2025	8	0	0	**8**
5	Forward	Mariah Lee	United States	2025–2026	6	0	0	**6**

Note: Bold indicates active player

=== Most career assists ===
As of November 10, 2026

#	Pos.	Name	Nation	Career at club	Goals assisted			
#	Pos.	Name	Nation	Career at club	NSL	WCC	Int'l	Total
1	Forward	**Jessica De Filippo**	Canada	2025–	7	0	0	**7**
1	Midfielder	**Quinn**	Canada	2025–	7	0	0	**7**
1	Forward	Holly Ward	Canada	2025	7	0	0	**7**
4	Midfielder	**Anna Bout**	Canada	2025–	5	0	0	**5**
4	Forward	**María Camila Reyes**	Colombia	2026–	5	0	0	**5**

Note: Bold indicates active player

=== Most career appearances ===
As of November 10, 2026

#	Pos.	Name	Nation	Career at club	Games played			
#	Pos.	Name	Nation	Career at club	NSL	WCC	Int'l	Total
1	Forward	**Jessica De Filippo**	Canada	2025–	52	0	0	**52**
2	Midfielder	**Josie Longhurst**	Wales	2025–	46	0	0	**46**
3	Goalkeeper	**Morgan McAslan**	Canada	2025–	42	0	0	**42**
4	Defender	**Jessika Cowart**	Philippines	2025–	39	0	0	**39**
5	Defender	**Yuka Okamoto**	Japan	2025–	38	0	0	**38**

Note: Bold indicates active player

== See also ==
- List of professional sports teams in the United States and Canada
- List of soccer clubs in Canada
- Vancouver Angels
