= Sura Yekka =

Canadian soccer player (born 1997)

Personal information
- Full name: Sura Bayoru Yekka
- Date of birth: January 4, 1997 (age 29)
- Place of birth: Toronto, Ontario, Canada
- Height: 1.65 m (5 ft 5 in)
- Position: Right-back

Team information
- Current team: Vancouver Rise
- Number: 4

Youth career
- North Mississauga SC
- Brampton Brams United

College career
Years	Team	Apps	(Gls)
2015–2019	Michigan Wolverines	69	(2)

Senior career*
Years	Team	Apps	(Gls)
2020–2021	MSV Duisburg	14	(0)
2021–2022	Le Havre	18	(0)
2023	Vittsjö	12	(0)
2024–2025	Djurgårdens IF	23	(2)
2026–	Vancouver Rise	0	(0)

International career^{‡}
2014	Canada U17	4	(0)
2014–2016	Canada U20	11	(1)
2013–	Canada	18	(0)
- * Club domestic league appearances and goals as of February 4, 2023 ‡ National team caps and goals as of November 15, 2022

Sura Bayoru Yekka (born January 4, 1997) is a Canadian professional soccer player who plays as a right-back for Northern Super League club Vancouver Rise FC and the Canada national team.

== Early life ==
Born in Toronto, Canada to Ugandan parents, Yekka began playing soccer at age six with North Mississauga SC. later playing with Brams United. She played for Team Ontario at the 2013 Canada Summer Games, where she was named a tournament all-star. Yekka also excelled in track and field, winning the bronze medal in the 800m at the 2010 U-16 Track and Field National Championships.

== College career ==
In 2015, she began attending the University of Michigan, where she played for the women's soccer team. She made her collegiate debut on August 21, 2015, against the Eastern Michigan Eagles and recorded her first career start and first career assist in a 3-0 victory on August 30 against the Detroit Mercy Titans. She was named to the Big Ten All-Freshman team for her debut season. She redshirted the 2016 season, due to her national team commitments. Yekka scored her first collegiate goal on October 6, 2019, against the Nebraska Cornhuskers.

== Club career ==
In September 2020, Yekka joined German club MSV Duisburg of the Frauen-Bundesliga.

In 2021, she joined Le Havre AC in the French Division 2 Féminine. In her first season, she helped them win promotion to the Division 1 Féminine.

In February 2023, she joined Swedish club Vittsjö GIK in the Damallsvenskan on a two-year contract. After one season in Vittsjö GIK, Yekka joined Djurgården on a two-year deal.

In January 2026, she signed with Northern Super League club Vancouver Rise FC, with Rise head coach Anja Heiner-Møller describing her as "a fast-thinking player that is decisive in her actions when defending and a strong player that wins many duels."

== International career ==
In December 2012, she made her debut in the Canadian youth program, attending a camp with the Canada U15 team. After attending a couple of more youth camps with the Canada U17 and Canada U20, Yekka was called up to the senior in October 2013, making her senior debut at age sixteen on October 30 against South Korea, without having played in any youth level games before. She earned her second senior cap on November 24 against Mexico, earning rave reviews for her performance in a 0-0 draw. She was named the 2013 Canadian U17 Player of the Year.

After having already made multiple appearances for the senior team in 2013 and early 2014, Yekka made her debut for the youth teams in 2014 appearing in both the 2014 FIFA U-17 Women's World Cup and 2014 FIFA U-20 Women's World Cup. She scored her first international goal on December 6, 2015, scoring the winning goal against Jamaica U20 at the 2015 CONCACAF Women's U-20 Championship. In 2015, Yekka was nominated for the Canadian U20 Player of the Year Award. She also played for the U20s in the 2016 FIFA U-20 Women's World Cup.

== Personal ==
Yekka is the daughter of Evelyn Adiru, a track and field athlete who specialized in the 800m and 1500, who represented Uganda at the 1984 Summer Olympics.
