= Josie Longhurst =

English-Welsh footballer (born 2002)

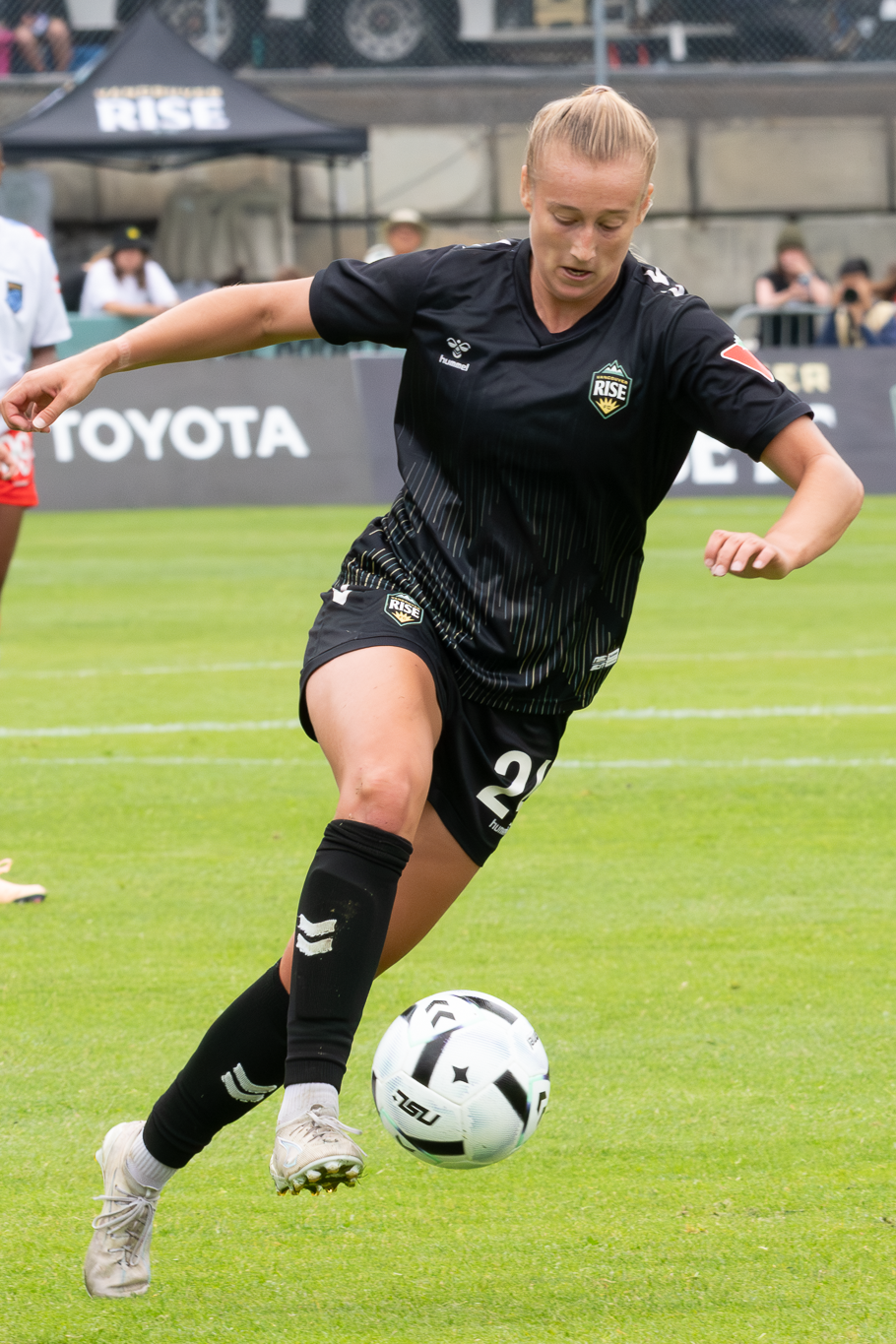
- Longhurst playing for Vancouver Rise FC in 2025

Personal information
- Full name: Josie Mae Longhurst
- Date of birth: 24 February 2002 (age 24)
- Place of birth: Edenbridge, England
- Height: 5 ft 5 in (1.65 m)
- Position: Midfielder

Team information
- Current team: Vancouver Rise FC
- Number: 24

Youth career
- Charlton Community Club
- Chelsea
- Millwall
- Cardiff City
- Brighton & Hove Albion

Senior career*
Years	Team	Apps	(Gls)
2022–2023	Lewes	13	(0)
2023–2024	Reading	16	(0)
2024	Whitecaps FC Girls Elite	1	(0)
2025–	Vancouver Rise	22	(0)

International career^{‡}
2018–2019	Wales U17	5	(1)
2019	Wales U19	3	(0)
- * Club domestic league appearances and goals as of 17 October 2025 ‡ National team caps and goals as of 8 October 2019

Josie Mae Longhurst (born 24 February 2002) is a footballer who plays for Vancouver Rise FC in the Northern Super League. Born in England, she represents Wales at international level.

== Early life ==
Longhurst began playing youth football with the Charlton Community Club, playing with boys. She then spent a year at U11 level with Chelsea, before joining Millwall for six years. She then returned to Wales for college and joined Cardiff City, before later joining Brighton & Hove Albion.

== Club career ==
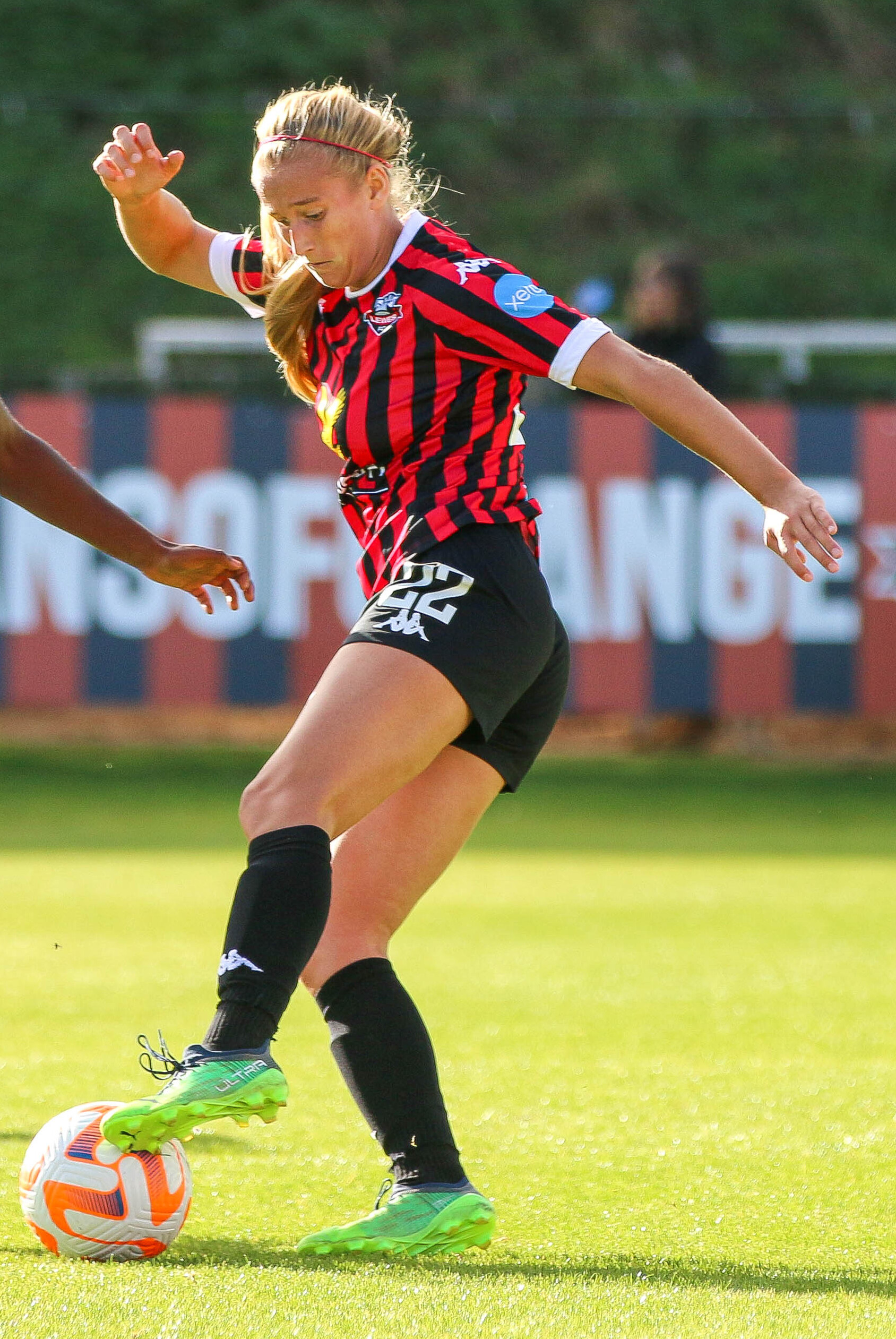
Longhurst playing for Lewes in 2022

In January 2022, Longhurst joined Lewes on a dual registration deal, while playing with the Brighton & Hove Albion youth. In June 2022, she joined Lewes on a permanent basis.

In September 2023, Longhurst signed with Reading in the Women's Championship. After one season with the club, she departed the team.

In July 2024, she joined the Whitecaps FC Girls Elite in League1 British Columbia, making her debut on July 20 against Rivers FC.

In December 2024, she signed with Northern Super League club Vancouver Rise FC, ahead of their inaugural 2025 season.

== International career ==
Longhurst has been called up to both the Wales U17 and Wales U19 teams. In October 2020, she was called up to the Wales senior team for the first time.

== Career statistics ==
As of 4 November 2025

Club	Season	League			Playoffs		Domestic Cup		Continental		Other		Total	
Club	Season	Division	Apps	Goals	Apps	Goals	Apps	Goals	Apps	Goals	Apps	Goals	Apps	Goals
Lewes	2021–22	FA Women's Championship	8	0	—		0	0	—		1 (Note: Appearance(s) in the FA Women's League Cup)	0	9	0
Lewes	2022–23	Women's Championship	5	0	—		0	0	—		1	0	6	0
Lewes	Total		13	0	0	0	0	0	0	0	2	0	15	0
Reading	2023–24	Women's Championship	16	0	—		1	0	—		4	0	21	0
Whitecaps FC Elite	2024	League1 British Columbia	1	0	2	1	—		5 (Note: Appearance(s) in the 2024–25 CONCACAF W Champions Cup)	0	2 (Note: Appearance(s) in the Women's Inter-Provincial Championship)	0	10	1
Vancouver Rise	2025	Northern Super League	22	0	1	0	—		—		—		23	0
Career total			52	0	3	1	1	0	5	0	8	0	69	1
