= Latifah Abdu =

Canadian soccer player (born 2001)

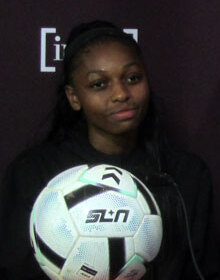
- Abdu in 2025

Personal information
- Full name: Latifah Iesha Abdu
- Date of birth: October 18, 2001 (age 25)
- Place of birth: Montreal, Quebec, Canada
- Height: 1.70 m (5 ft 7 in)
- Position: Forward

Team information
- Current team: Vancouver Rise FC
- Number: 99

Youth career
- 2010–2012: Lachine SC
- 2013–2018: Lakeshore SC

College career
Years	Team	Apps	(Gls)
2019–2021	Vanier Cheetahs		(21)

Senior career*
Years	Team	Apps	(Gls)
2018	Lakers du Lac Saint-Louis	9	(5)
2019	CS Monteuil	12	(5)
2020	Soyaux	1	(0)
2021	CS Mont-Royal Outremont	9	(8)
2022	Metz	10	(4)
2022–2023	Strasbourg	16	(9)
2023–2024	Dijon	14	(2)
2024	Guingamp	9	(0)
2025	Montreal Roses	16	(6)
2025–	Vancouver Rise FC	7	(3)

International career^{‡}
2023–	Canada	1	(0)
- * Club domestic league appearances and goals as of October 17, 2025 ‡ National team caps and goals as of December 1, 2023

Latifah Iesha Abdu (born October 18, 2001) is a Canadian soccer player who plays as a forward for Vancouver Rise FC in the Northern Super League and the Canada national team.

== Early life ==
Abdu began playing youth soccer at age nine with Lachine SC. She later played with Lakeshore SC, leading the team to a silver medal at the 2018 U17 national championship, leading the tournament with 12 goals.

In 2017, she played with Team Quebec at the 2017 Canada Summer Games, winning the gold medal. She was named to the tournament all-star team.

== College career ==
In 2019, Abdu began attending Vanier College, where she played for the women's soccer team. In her first season, she scored 11 goals and added an additional three goals in the playoffs, helping the team to the RSEQ Division 2 title. In her second season in 2021, she won the RSEQ Division 1 title with the club, scoring 10 goals in seven games. She also helped the team with the CCAA national title, also winning the CCAA Player of the Year award.

== Club career ==
In 2018 and 2019, she played with Lakers du Lac Saint-Louis and CS Monteuil in the semi-professional Première ligue de soccer du Québec.

In September 2020, she signed a professional contract with French club Soyaux in the Division 1 Féminine. She made her professional debut on October 2, 2020.

In the summer of 2021, she returned to the PLSQ and played with CS Mont-Royal Outremont. She won the league's golden boot as the top scorer and was named the Ballon de bronze winner as the league's third best player.

In January 2022, she joined Metz in the Division 2 Féminine.

In September 2022, she joined Strasbourg. On January 21, 2023, she scored a hat-trick in a 3–2 victory over her former club Metz.

In July 2023, she signed with Dijon in the Division 1 Féminine on a two-year contract. On September 30, she scored her first goal for the club against Lille.

In July 2024, she signed with En Avant Guingamp.

In December 2024, she returned to Canada to sign with Montreal Roses of the Northern Super League for the inaugural season in 2025. On April 27, 2025, Abdu scored her first goal for the Roses in a 3–1 victory over Vancouver Rise FC, which was also the first goal at home in club history. In August 2025, after the club told her they intended to pick up her option for the 2026 season, Abdu requested her release from the club, with the club announcing they would begin a "transition process" to explore possibilities. At the time, she was the club's leading scorer (and third in the league) with six goals.

On August 30, 2025, she moved to fellow Northern Super League side Vancouver Rise FC, for an undisclosed transfer fee, with the agreement that she would not feature in any matches against her former club for the remainder of the season. On September 6, 2025, she scored two goals in her debut with the Rise, in a 6–0 victory over Calgary Wild FC.

== International career ==
In April 2017, she made her debut in the Canadian national program attending a camp with the Canada U17 team.

In November 2023, she was called up to the Canada senior team for the first time, ahead of a pair of friendlies in December against Australia. She made her international debut in the first match on December 1.

== Personal life ==
Born in Canada, Abdu is of Ghanaian and Vincentian descent through her father and mother, respectively.

== Career statistics ==
As of October 17, 2025

Club	Season	League			Playoffs		National Cup		Other		Total	
Club	Season	League	Apps	Goals	Apps	Goals	Apps	Goals	Apps	Goals	Apps	Goals
Lakers du Lac Saint-Louis	2018	Première ligue de soccer du Québec	9	5	—		—		—		9	5
CS Monteuil	2019	Première ligue de soccer du Québec	12	5	—		—		—		9	5
Soyaux	2020–21	Division 1 Féminine	1	0	—		0	0	—		1	0
CS Mont-Royal Outremont	2021	Première ligue de soccer du Québec	9	8	—		—		—		9	8
Metz	2021–22	Division 2 Féminine	10	4	—		0	0	—		10	4
Strasbourg	2022–23	Division 2 Féminine	16	9	—		2	3	—		18	12
Dijon	2023–24	Division 1 Féminine	14	2	—		0	0	—		14	2
Guingamp	2024–25	Première Ligue	9	0	—		0	0	—		9	0
Montreal Roses FC	2025	Northern Super League	16	6	0	0	—		—		16	6
Vancouver Rise FC	2025	Northern Super League	7	3	3	2	—		—		10	5
Career total			103	42	3	2	2	3	0	0	108	47
