= Anaïs Oularbi =

Algerian footballer (born 2003)

Personal information
- Full name: Naila Anaïs Oularbi
- Date of birth: March 24, 2003 (age 23)
- Place of birth: Kouba, Algeria
- Height: 5 ft 7 in (1.70 m)
- Position: Midfielder

Team information
- Current team: Vancouver Rise
- Number: 26

Youth career
- CS Mercier-Hochelaga-Maisonneuve
- AS Rosemont La Petite Patrie
- Notre-Dame-de-Grâce SA
- FC Barcelona Academy Montréal

College career
Years	Team	Apps	(Gls)
2021–2022	Radford Highlanders	29	(2)
2023	UAB Blazers	11	(1)

Senior career*
Years	Team	Apps	(Gls)
2022	CS Mont-Royal Outremont	1	(0)
2024	CS Mont-Royal Outremont	9	(0)
2025–	Vancouver Rise	3	(0)
2025–	→ Vancouver Rise FC Academy	0	(0)

International career
2019–	Algeria U20	16	(0)
2019	Algeria U21		
- * Club domestic league appearances and goals as of July 15, 2025

Naila Anaïs Oularbi (born March 24, 2003) is an Algerian footballer who plays as a midfielder for Vancouver Rise FC in the Northern Super League.

== Early life ==
Oularbi was born in Kouba, Algeria in 2003, moving to Montreal, Canada at the age of two. When she was 10, she began playing youth soccer with CS Mercier-Hochelaga-Maisonneuve, later joining AS Rosemont La Petite Patrie and CS Notre-Dame-de-Grâce, while also briefly spending some time with the FC Barcelona Academy in Montreal.

== College career ==
She began her post-secondary career attending Collège Ahuntsic.

In 2021, Oularbi began attending Radford University, where she played for the women's soccer team. On September 16, 2021, she scored her first goal in a victory over the VMI Keydets.

In 2023, she moved to the University of Alabama at Birmingham, where she played for the women's soccer team. On August 24, 2023, she scored her first goal in a victory over the Alabama State Lady Hornets.

== Club career ==
She began her senior career with CS Mont-Royal Outremont in Ligue1 Québec.

In February 2025, she signed with Vancouver Rise FC in the Northern Super League.

== International career ==
In December 2018, Oularbi was invited to her first camp with the Algeria U20. She became the youngest player to join the team. She later won a gold medal with the Algeria U21 at the 2019 UNAF U-21 Women's Tournament.

In October 2026, she was called up to the Algeria senior team for the first time, for matches at the 2028 CAF Women's Olympic qualifying tournament.

== Honours ==
Northern Super League - Canada

- Northern Super League: Champions 2025
