= 2024 Pacific FC season =

Canadian soccer club's season of play

Pacific FC
2024 season
- Chairman: Dean Shillington
- Head coach: James Merriman
- Stadium: Starlight Stadium
- Canadian Premier League: 5th
- CPL playoffs: Play-in round
- Canadian Championship: Semi-finals

The 2024 Pacific FC season was the sixth season in the history of Pacific FC. In addition to the Canadian Premier League, the club also competed in the Canadian Championship.

== Squad ==
As of August 16, 2024

No.	Player	Nationality	Position(s)	Date of birth (age)	Previous club	Notes
Goalkeepers
1	Emil Gazdov	(Canada)	GK	September 11, 2003 (aged 21)	(Germany) FC Nürnberg	U21
55	Sean Melvin	(Canada)	GK	July 9, 1994 (aged 30)	(Canada) Atlético Ottawa	
Defenders
2	Georges Mukumbilwa	(Canada)	RB	September 23, 1999 (aged 25)	(Canada) Vancouver Whitecaps FC	U21
3	Eric Lajeunesse	(Canada)	CB	March 10, 2003 (aged 21)	(Canada) UBC Thunderbirds	U21, U-S
4	Paul Amedume	(Canada)	CB / DM	February 28, 2003 (aged 21)	(United States) North Texas SC	U21
5	Juan Quintana	(Colombia)	CB	November 10, 2003 (aged 21)	(Colombia) Orsomarso S.C.	INT
13	Kunle Dada-Luke	(Canada)	FB / RW	January 12, 2000 (aged 24)	(Canada) Atlético Ottawa	
15	Christian Greco-Taylor	(Canada)	LB	February 20, 2005 (aged 19)	(Canada) Whitecaps FC Academy	U21
26	Thomas Meilleur-Giguère	(Canada)	CB	November 13, 1997 (aged 27)	(Canada) Montreal Impact	
44	Aly Ndom	(France)	CB / DM	May 30, 1996 (aged 28)	(Finland) IFK Mariehamn	INT, IL
	Kevin Ceceri	(Argentina)	LB	February 2, 1996 (aged 28)	(Romania) Steaua București	INT
	Will Edgson	(Canada)	FB		(Canada) Van Isle Wave	DEV
Midfielders
7	Steffen Yeates	(Canada)	CM	January 4, 2000 (aged 24)	(Canada) Toronto FC II	
8	Pierre Lamothe	(Canada)	AM	September 18, 1997 (aged 27)	(Canada) HFX Wanderers	
11	Josh Heard	(Wales)	AM	November 29, 1994 (aged 30)	(United States) Real Monarchs	
18	Zakaria Bahous	(Canada)	MF	August 5, 2001 (aged 23)	(Canada) Atlético Ottawa	
20	Sean Young	(Canada)	CM	April 20, 2001 (aged 23)	(Canada) Victoria Highlanders	
28	Cédric Toussaint	(Canada)	CM / AM	March 29, 2001 (aged 23)	(Canada) York United	
34	Sami Keshavarz	(Canada)	CM	August 18, 2006 (aged 18)	(Canada) Van Isle Wave	DEV
88	Andrei Tîrcoveanu	(Romania)	AM	May 22, 1997 (aged 27)	(Romania) FC Argeș	INT
	Marco Domínguez	(Guatemala)	DM	February 25, 1996 (aged 28)	(Guatemala) Municipal	
	Mattias Vales	(Canada)	AM	February 29, 2008 (aged 16)	(Canada) Van Isle Wave	DEV
Forwards
9	Dario Zanatta	(Canada)	CF	May 24, 1997 (aged 27)	(Scotland) Hamilton Academical	
10	Adonijah Reid	(Canada)	CF	August 13, 1999 (aged 25)	(United States) Miami FC	
12	Reon Moore	(Trinidad and Tobago)	CF	September 22, 1996 (aged 28)	(Trinidad and Tobago) Defence Force	INT
	Moses Dyer	(New Zealand)	CF / CM	March 21, 1997 (aged 27)	(Canada) Vancouver FC	INT, Loan
	Devin O'Hea	(Canada)	ST	February 5, 2000 (aged 24)	(Canada) TSS FC Rovers	

== Transfers ==
=== In ===
No.	Pos.	Player	From club	Fee/notes	Date	Source
	FW	(Trinidad and Tobago) Reon Moore	(Trinidad and Tobago) Defence Force	Free	January 8, 2024	
	FW	(Canada) Dario Zanatta	(Scotland) Hamilton Academical	Undisclosed fee & add-ons	January 31, 2024	
	GK	(Canada) Sean Melvin	(Canada) Atlético Ottawa	Free	February 1, 2024	
	MF	(France) Aly Ndom	(Finland) IFK Mariehamn	Free	February 8, 2024	
	MF	(Romania) Andrei Tîrcoveanu	(Romania) FC Argeș	Free	March 7, 2024	
	DF	(Canada) Christian Greco-Taylor	(Canada) Whitecaps FC Academy	Free	March 25, 2024	
	MF	(Canada) Sami Keshavarz	(Canada) Van Isle Wave	Development contract	April 3, 2024	
	DF	(Canada) Eric Lajeunesse	(Canada) UBC Thunderbirds	U-Sports contract	April 12, 2024	
	DF	(Colombia) Juan Quintana	(Colombia) Orsomarso S.C.	Free	April 16, 2024	
	MF	(Canada) Mattias Vales	(Canada) Van Isle Wave	Development contract	June 1, 2024	
	MF	(Guatemala) Marco Domínguez	(Guatemala) Municipal	Free	June 26, 2024	
	DF	(Canada) Will Edgson	(Canada) Van Isle Wave	Development contract	July 18, 2024	
	FW	(Canada) Devin O'Hea	(Canada) TSS FC Rovers	Free	July 22, 2024	
	DF	(Argentina) Kevin Ceceri	(Romania) Steaua București	Free	August 1, 2024	

==== Loans in ====
No.	Pos.	Player	Loaned from	Fee/notes	Date	Source
18	FW	(New Zealand) Moses Dyer	(Canada) Vancouver FC	Season-long loan	August 16, 2024	

==== Draft picks ====
Pacific FC selected the following players in the 2024 CPL–U Sports Draft. Draft picks are not automatically signed to the team roster. Only those who are signed to a contract will be listed as transfers in.

Round	Selection	Pos.	Player	Nationality	University
1	6	FW	Michael Maslanka	Canada	Toronto
2	14	DF	Ibrahem Saadi	Canada	Western

=== Out ===
No.	Pos.	Player	To club	Fee/notes	Date	Source
12	GK	(Canada) Kieran Baskett	(Norway) Brattvåg IL	Contract expired	November 29, 2023	
14	FW	(Portugal) David Brazão	(Lithuania) Džiugas Telšiai	Contract expired	November 29, 2023	
19	FW	(Canada) Abdul Binate	(Canada) Valour FC	Contract expired	November 29, 2023	
16	DF	(Canada) Jalen Watson		Loan ended	November 29, 2023	
34	MF	(Canada) Manny Aparicio		Contract expired	January 8, 2024	
9	FW	(Canada) Easton Ongaro	(Italy) Novara FC	Undisclosed fee	January 17, 2024	
55	DF	(Canada) Amer Didić		Contract expired	January 17, 2024	
23	FW	(Netherlands) Djenairo Daniels	(Portugal) Leixões	Option declined	January 26, 2024	
5	DF	(Netherlands) Bradley Vliet	(United Arab Emirates) Arabian Falcons FC	Contract terminated by mutual consent	February 21, 2024	
31	MF	(The Gambia) Kekuta Manneh		Contract terminated by mutual consent	March 29, 2024	

==== Loans out ====
No.	Pos.	Player	Loaned to	Fee/notes	Date	Source
8	MF	(Canada) Pierre Lamothe	(Vietnam) Quang Nam	Loaned until March 10, 2024	September 1, 2023	
21	FW	(Netherlands) Ayman Sellouf	(Canada) Pacific FC	Season-long loan	August 16, 2024	

== Competitions ==
=== Overview ===
Competition	Starting round	Final position	Record							
Competition	Starting round	Final position	Pld	W	D	L	GF	GA	GD	Win %
Canadian Premier League	Matchday 1	5th	28	9	7	12	27	32	−5	32.14
CPL Playoffs	Play-in round	Play-in round	1	0	0	1	0	2	−2	0.00
Canadian Championship	Preliminary round	Semi-finals	5	1	2	2	3	4	−1	20.00
Total			34	10	9	15	30	38	−8	29.41

Last updated: October 23, 2024
Source: Competitions

=== Canadian Premier League ===
==== Table ====
Pos	Team	Pld	W	D	L	GF	GA	GD	Pts	Playoff qualification
1	Forge (S)	28	15	5	8	45	31	+14	50	First semifinal
2	Cavalry (C)	28	12	12	4	39	27	+12	48	First semifinal
3	Atlético Ottawa	28	11	11	6	42	31	+11	44	Quarterfinal
4	York United	28	11	6	11	35	36	−1	39	Play-in round
5	Pacific	28	9	7	12	27	32	−5	34	Play-in round
6	HFX Wanderers	28	7	9	12	37	43	−6	30 (Note: Head-to-head points: HFX Wanderers 7, Vancouver 4)	
7	Vancouver	28	7	9	12	29	43	−14	30	
8	Valour	28	7	7	14	31	42	−11	28	

Source: CanPL
Rules for classification: 1) Points; 2) Total number of wins; 3) Head-to-head; 4) Goal differential; 5) Goals for; 6) Away goals differential; 7) Away goals for; 8) Home goals differential; 9) Home goals for; 10) Fewest disciplinary points; 11) Most under-21 domestic player minutes; 12) Drawing of lots.
(C) Champion (qualified to Champions Cup Round one); (S) CPL Shield winner (qualified to Champions Cup Round one)

==== Results by match ====
Match	1	2	3	4	5	6	7	8	9	10	11	12	13	15	16	17	18	19	20	21	22	23	14 (Note: Matchday 14 (vs HFX Wanderers) was postponed to September 14 due to Pacific's participation in the Canadian Championship quarter-finals.)	24	25	26	27	28
Ground	H	H	A	H	H	H	A	H	A	A	A	H	A	A	H	H	A	H	A	A	H	H	A	A	A	H	A	H
Result	W	W	D	W	D	L	L	D	D	W	L	L	W	L	L	D	L	L	L	L	W	W	D	D	L	L	W	W
Position (Note: Positions show the situation at the end of the corresponding game weeks, not the position at the conclusion of matches or game days.)	4	3	3	2	2	2	3	4	4	2	4	5	4	5	6	5	6	7	7	8	6	6	5	5	5	6	5	5

Source: #Matches
H = Home; N = Neutral; A = Away; W = Win; D = Draw; L = Loss; = Playoffs first semi-final; = Quarter-final; = Play-in round

==== Matches ====
April 13 1	Pacific FC	1–0	HFX Wanderers FC	Langford, British Columbia
4:00 pm PT	Moore (yellow card) 25'; Meilleur-Giguère (yellow card) 28'; Sellouf 35' (pen.); Ndom (yellow card) 56'	Report	Nimick (yellow card) 86'	Stadium: Starlight Stadium; Attendance: 4,367; Referee: Michael Venne

April 19 2	Pacific FC	2–0	Valour FC	Langford, British Columbia
7:00 pm PT	Heard 47' (yellow card) 51'; Bahous (yellow card) 79'; Young 79'	Report	Facchineri (yellow card) 15'; Swibel (yellow card) 37'; Verhoeven (yellow card) 44'; Campbell (yellow card) 84'; Haynes (yellow card) 90+2'	Stadium: Starlight Stadium; Attendance: 2,851

April 28 3	Cavalry FC	0–0	Pacific FC	Foothills County, Alberta
3:00 pm MT		Report	Heard (yellow card) 63'; Toussaint (yellow card) 85'	Stadium: ATCO Field; Attendance: 4,183

May 4 4	Pacific FC	2–0	York United FC	Langford, British Columbia
4:00 pm PT	Moore 15'; Dada-Luke (yellow card) 28'; Toussaint (yellow card) 41'; Ferrari 77' (o.g.)	Report	Soumaoro (yellow card) 41'; Salanović (yellow card) 43'; Adekugbe (yellow card) 90+2'	Stadium: Starlight Stadium; Attendance: 2,161; Referee: Sebastian Noshinravani

May 11 5	Pacific FC	0–0	Forge FC	Langford, British Columbia
2:00 pm PT	Quintana (yellow card) 46'; Lajeunesse (yellow card) 70'; Moore (red card) 90+3'	Report	Tavernier (yellow card) 88'	Stadium: Starlight Stadium; Attendance: 2,322; Referee: Scott Bowman

May 17 6	Pacific FC	0–1	Atlético Ottawa	Langford, British Columbia
7:00 pm PT	Tîrcoveanu (yellow card) 29'; Heard (yellow card) 49'; Greco-Taylor (yellow card) 70'	Report	Del Campo 32' (yellow card) 39'; Singh (yellow card) 45+4'; Yesli (yellow card) 47'	Stadium: Starlight Stadium; Attendance: 2,720; Referee: Michael Venne

May 25 7	Vancouver FC	2–1	Pacific FC	Langley Township, British Columbia
3:00 pm PT	Dyer 40', (yellow card) 65'; Fry (yellow card) 45', (goal) 85'; Garcia (yellow card) 81'; Navarro (yellow card) 90+2'	Report	Sellouf 6' (pen.); Bahous (yellow card) 26'; Dada-Luke (yellow card) 51'	Stadium: Willoughby Community Park; Attendance: 3,127; Referee: Ben Hoskins

June 1 8	Pacific FC	1–1	Cavalry FC	Langford, British Columbia
4:00 pm PT	Yeates 6'; Lamothe (yellow card) 45+1'; Young (yellow card) 71'	Report	Warschewski 67'	Stadium: Starlight Stadium; Attendance: 3,264

June 8 9	HFX Wanderers FC	0–0	Pacific FC	Halifax, Nova Scotia
3:00 pm AT	Callegari (yellow card) 8'; Fillion (yellow card) 82'; Fernandez (yellow card) 82'	Report	Quintana (yellow card) 52' (yellow-red card) 53'; Gazdov (yellow card) 87'; Greco-Taylor (yellow card) 88'; Lamothe (yellow card) 88'	Stadium: Wanderers Grounds; Attendance: 6,034; Referee: Yusri Rudolf

June 14 10	Valour FC	2–3	Pacific FC	Winnipeg, Manitoba
7:00 pm CT	Hundal 45+2'; Swibel 63'; Alarcón (yellow card) 80'	Report	Young 19' (pen.); Tîrcoveanu 33'; Moore (yellow card) 66'; Hundal 75' (o.g.); Heard (yellow card) 80'; Yeates (yellow card) 89'; Zanatta (yellow card) 90+5'; Toussaint (yellow card) 90+5'	Stadium: Princess Auto Stadium; Attendance: 3,032

June 19 11	York United FC	2–0	Pacific FC	Toronto, Ontario
7:00 pm ET	Wright 37'; Ricci (red card) 38'; Soumaoro (yellow card) 43'; Babouli 53'; Vincensini (yellow card) 73'; Botello (yellow card) 90+1'	Report	Young (yellow card) 38'	Stadium: York Lions Stadium; Attendance: 844

June 27 12	Pacific FC	1–2	Vancouver FC	Langford, British Columbia
7:30 pm PT	Meilleur-Giguère 38'; Young (yellow card) 90'	Report	Romeo (yellow card) 4'; Díaz 40'; Gee (yellow card) 76'; Bah 82'	Stadium: Starlight Stadium; Attendance: 3,255; Referee: Alain Ruch

July 7 13	Atlético Ottawa	0–1	Pacific FC	Ottawa, Ontario
7:00 pm ET	del Campo (yellow card) 90+3'	Report	Lajeunesse (yellow card) 26'; Bahous 45+3'; Greco-Taylor (yellow card) 85'; Quintana (yellow card) 90+4'	Stadium: TD Place Stadium; Attendance: 5,794

July 14 15	Forge FC	2–1	Pacific FC	Hamilton, Ontario
7:00 pm ET	Owolabi-Belewu (yellow card) 44'; Poku 47'; Poku 85'	Report	Sellouf 33' (pen.); Young (yellow card) 43'	Stadium: Tim Hortons Field; Attendance: 4,324

July 28 16	Pacific FC	0–3	Valour FC	Langford, British Columbia
2:00 pm PT	Yeates (yellow card) 21'; Gazdov (yellow card) 90+2'; Toussaint (yellow card) 90+6'	Report	Antonoglou 43'; Mlah (yellow card) 52'; Ohin (yellow card) 65'; Hundal 76' (pen.); Verhoeven (yellow card) 84'; Viscosi (yellow card) 90'; Binate 90+2'	Stadium: Starlight Stadium; Attendance: 3,093

August 2 17	Pacific FC	1–1	York United FC	Langford, British Columbia
7:00 pm PT	Meilleur-Giguère 2'; Domínguez (yellow card) 40'; Mukumbilwa (yellow card) 55'	Report	Wright 9'; Martínez Huerta (yellow card) 43'	Stadium: Starlight Stadium; Attendance: 2,658

August 11 18	Vancouver FC	1–0	Pacific FC	Langley Township, British Columbia
2:00 pm PT	Rommens (yellow card) 51'; Díaz 62'; Fry (yellow card) 75'; Cameron (yellow card) 90+4'	Report	Heard (yellow card) 26'; Domínguez (yellow card) 43'; Quintana (yellow card) 57'	Stadium: Willoughby Community Park; Attendance: 3,258

August 17 19	Pacific FC	0–3	Atlético Ottawa	Langford, British Columbia
3:00 pm PT	Tîrcoveanu (yellow card) 28'; Mukumbilwa (yellow card) 64'	Report	Sissoko 2'; Iliadis 15'; del Campo 22'; Morer (yellow card) 40'; Didić (yellow card) 42'; Tabla (yellow card) 90+4'	Stadium: Starlight Stadium; Attendance: 3,051

August 24 20	Cavalry FC	1–0	Pacific FC	Foothills County, Alberta
3:00 pm MT	Klomp (yellow card) 90+1'; Klomp 90+1'	Report	Quintana (yellow card) 57'; Gazdov (yellow card) 85'	Stadium: ATCO Field; Attendance: 5,043

August 30 21	Forge FC	2–0	Pacific FC	Hamilton, Ontario
7:00 pm ET	Jensen 25'; Jensen 59'	Report	Domínguez (yellow card) 15'; Ceceri (yellow card) 61'; Reid (yellow card) 90+5'	Stadium: Tim Hortons Field; Attendance: 5,753

September 7 22	Pacific FC	3–0	HFX Wanderers FC	Langford, British Columbia
7:00 pm PT	Tîrcoveanu 33'; Quintana (yellow card) 38'; Toussaint (yellow card) 53'; Zanatta 63' (pen.); Dyer 81'; Bahous (yellow card) 88'	Report	Coimbra (yellow card) 9'; Nimick (yellow card) 38' (yellow-red card) 43'; Gagnon-Laparé (yellow card) 52'; Alphonse (yellow card) 62'; Loughrey (yellow card) 74' (yellow-red card) 74'	Stadium: Starlight Stadium; Attendance: 3,283

September 14 23	Pacific FC	3–0	Vancouver FC	Langford, British Columbia
2:00 pm PT	Zanatta 7'; Domínguez (yellow card) 14'; Merriman (yellow card) 18'; Dyer 43'; Tîrcoveanu (yellow card) 44'; Dyer (yellow card) 68'; Zanatta 72'	Report	Fry (yellow card) 17'; Irving (yellow card) 43'; Cantave (yellow card) 71'; Campagna (yellow card) 72'	Stadium: Starlight Stadium; Attendance: 2,807

September 18 14	HFX Wanderers FC	2–2	Pacific FC	Halifax, Nova Scotia
7:00 pm AT	Nimick (yellow card) 20' (yellow-red card) 31'; Ferrin 60'; Probo (yellow card) 64'; Mekidèche 79'; Gagnon-Laparé (yellow card) 90'; Fillion (yellow card) 90+8'	Report	Meilleur-Giguère (yellow card) 11'; Dyer 67'; Meilleur-Giguère 90+6'	Stadium: Wanderers Grounds; Attendance: 5,793

September 22 24	Atlético Ottawa	1–1	Pacific FC	Ottawa, Ontario
2:00 pm ET	Sissoko 29'; Sissoko (yellow card) 30'; Morer (yellow card) 39'	Report	Domínguez (yellow card) 37'; Dyer 53'; Dyer (yellow card) 54'; Young (yellow card) 56'; Reid (yellow card) 90+6'	Stadium: TD Place Stadium; Attendance: 7,091

September 30 25	Valour FC	1–0	Pacific FC	Winnipeg, Manitoba
7:00 pm CT	Alarcón (yellow card) 49'; Viscosi (yellow card) 75'; Ceceri 76' (o.g.)	Report	Lamothe (yellow card) 45+3' (yellow-red card) 83'; Greco-Taylor (yellow card) 69'; Dyer (yellow card) 75'	Stadium: Princess Auto Stadium; Attendance: 2,702

October 5 26	Pacific FC	1–4	Cavalry FC	Langford, British Columbia
2:00 pm PT	Gazdov (red card) 3'; Meilleur-Giguère (yellow card) 31'; Zanatta 38' (pen.); Domínguez (yellow card) 49'; Ceceri (yellow card) 81' (yellow-red card) 84'	Report	Herdman 35'; Warschewski 61'; Herdman (yellow card) 63'; Warschewski 75'; Wright 77'	Stadium: Starlight Stadium; Attendance: 3,189

October 10 27	York United FC	1–2	Pacific FC	Toronto, Ontario
7:00 pm ET	Vincensini (yellow card) 24'; León 44'; Márquez (yellow card) 62'; Baldisimo (yellow card) 67'; Ferrari (yellow card) 90+7'	Report	Greco-Taylor (yellow card) 49'; Yeates (yellow card) 49'; Quintana (yellow card) 69'; Moore 82'; Moore 88'	Stadium: York Lions Stadium; Attendance: 1,034

October 19 28	Pacific FC	1–0	Forge FC	Langford, British Columbia
1:00 pm PT	Zanatta 32'; Reid (yellow card) 60'; Domínguez (yellow card) 85'	Report	Kane (yellow card) 45+1'	Stadium: Starlight Stadium

==== Playoff matches ====
October 23 Play-in round	York United FC	2–0	Pacific FC	Toronto, Ontario
7:30 pm ET	Córdova (yellow card) 40'; Salanović (yellow card) 43'; León 47'; Babouli 90+2'	Report	Zanatta (yellow card) 64'	Stadium: York Lions Stadium; Attendance: 2,203

=== Canadian Championship ===
Preliminary round

May 1	Pacific FC	1–1 (5–4 p)	TSS Rovers FC	Langford, British Columbia
7:00 pm PT	Quintana (yellow card) 2'; Bahous (yellow card) 14'; Moore 90+8'	Report	Hennessy 75'; Tome (yellow card) 81'; Smychenko (yellow card) 90+1'	Stadium: Starlight Stadium; Attendance: 2,161; Referee: Alain Ruch
	Penalties
	Sellouf (penalty missed); Meilleur-Giguère (penalty missed); Yeates (penalty scored); Tîrcoveanu (penalty scored); Dada-Luke (penalty scored); Toussaint (penalty scored); Heard (penalty scored)		(penalty scored) Polisi; (penalty missed) Jones; (penalty missed) O'Hea; (penalty scored) Hennessy; (penalty scored) White; (penalty scored) Zohar; (penalty missed) Mejia

Quarter-finals

May 8 Leg 1	Atlético Ottawa	0–0	Pacific FC	Ottawa, Ontario
7:00 pm ET	de Brienne (yellow card) 33'; Bassett (yellow card) 62'	Report	Dada-Luke (yellow card) 90+8'	Stadium: TD Place; Attendance: 1,977; Referee: Marie-Soleil Beaudoin

May 29 Leg 2	Pacific FC	2–1 (2–1 agg.)	Atlético Ottawa	Langford, British Columbia
7:00 pm PT	Sellouf 28' (pen.); Heard 34'; Lajeunesse (yellow card) 66'; Moore (yellow card) 89'	Report	Didic (yellow card) 26'; Salter 60' (yellow card) 90+2'; Bassett (yellow card) 69'; Sissoko (yellow card) 87'; Antinoro (yellow card) 90+8'	Stadium: Starlight Stadium; Attendance: 2,810; Referee: Pierre-Luc Lauzière

Semi-finals

July 10 Leg 1	Pacific FC	0–1	Vancouver Whitecaps FC	Langford, British Columbia
7:00 pm PT	Toussaint (yellow card) 82'	Report	Utvik (yellow card) 45'; Gauld 58'; White (yellow card) 81'	Stadium: Starlight Stadium; Attendance: 5,103

August 27 Leg 2	Vancouver Whitecaps FC	0–1 (2–0 agg.)	Pacific FC	Vancouver, British Columbia
7:30 pm PT	Gauld 58'	Report	Quintana (yellow card) 40'; Toussaint (yellow card) 45+2'; Ceceri (yellow card) 90+1'	Stadium: BC Place; Attendance: 10,966
