= Gurman Sangha =

Canadian soccer player (born 2000)

Personal information
- Full name: Gurman Singh Sangha
- Date of birth: February 4, 2000 (age 26)
- Place of birth: Burnaby, British Columbia, Canada
- Height: 1.85 m (6 ft 1 in)
- Position: Forward

Youth career
- 2009–2012: Wesburn FC
- 2013: Coquitlam Metro-Ford SC
- 2014–2016: Mountain United FC
- 2016–2018: Vancouver Whitecaps FC

College career
Years	Team	Apps	(Gls)
2018–2021	Memphis Tigers	45	(6)
2021–2022	Portland Pilots	39	(8)

Senior career*
Years	Team	Apps	(Gls)
2019	TSS FC Rovers	10	(0)
2022	Whitecaps FC Academy	10	(6)
2023	Crown Legacy FC	12	(0)
2024	TSS FC Rovers	7	(3)
2024	Altona City SC	2	(2)
- * Club domestic league appearances and goals as of July 22, 2024

Gurman Singh Sangha (born February 4, 2000) is a Canadian soccer player.

== Early life ==
Sangha began playing youth soccer at the age of six with Wesburn FC. He later played with Mountain United FC before joining the Vancouver Whitecaps FC Academy in August 2016.

== College career ==
In 2018, Sangha began attending the University of Memphis, where he played for the men's soccer team. On October 20, 2018, he scored his first collegiate goal in a 1-0 victory over the Tulsa Golden Hurricane. The performance earned him AAC Rookie of the Week honours. At the end of his freshman season, he was named to the AAC All-Rookie Team. At the end of his sophomore season, he was named to the All-AAC Second Team. Ahead of the 2021 spring season (delayed from fall 2020 due to the COVID-19 pandemic), he was named to the All-AAC Preseason Team.

In 2021, Sangha transferred to the University of Portland to play for the men's soccer team. He scored his first goal on October 23, 2021 against the Loyola Marymount Lions, where earned him WCC Offensive Player of the Week honours. During the 2022 season, he was named the WCC Player of the Week twice. At the end of the 2022 season, he was named an All-WCC Honourable Mention.

== Club career ==
In 2019, Sangha played with TSS FC Rovers in USL League Two.

In May 2022, he joined the Whitecaps FC Academy team for their season in League1 British Columbia. On May 29, he scored a hat trick in a 3-0 victory over Altitude FC.

In January 2023, he signed with Crown Legacy FC in MLS Next Pro.

== International career ==
Sangha was born in Canada to parents of Indian descent. In April 2015, he was called up to an identification camp with the Canada U15 team for the first time.

== Career statistics ==
As of match played July 22, 2024

Club	Season	League			Playoffs		Domestic Cup		Continental		Total	
Club	Season	Division	Apps	Goals	Apps	Goals	Apps	Goals	Apps	Goals	Apps	Goals
TSS FC Rovers	2019	USL League Two	10	0	–		–		–		10	0
Whitecaps FC Academy	2022	League1 British Columbia	10	6	–		–		–		10	6
Crown Legacy FC	2023	MLS Next Pro	12	0	0	0	–		–		12	0
TSS FC Rovers	2024	League1 British Columbia	7	3	0	0	1	0	–		8	3
Altona City SC	2024	Victoria Premier League 2	2	2	–		0	0	–		8	3
Career total			41	11	0	0	1	0	0	0	42	11
