= Eric Lajeunesse =

Canadian soccer player (born 2003)

Personal information
- Full name: Eric James Lajeunesse
- Date of birth: March 10, 2003 (age 23)
- Place of birth: Ottawa, Ontario, Canada
- Height: 6 ft 2 in (1.88 m)
- Position: Defender

Youth career
- 2011–2021: Ottawa St. Anthony Futuro Academy
- 2021–2022: Vancouver Whitecaps FC

College career
Years	Team	Apps	(Gls)
2022–	UBC Thunderbirds	40	(2)

Senior career*
Years	Team	Apps	(Gls)
2022	Whitecaps FC Academy	12	(0)
2023–	Pacific FC	35	(0)
2023	→ Nautsa’mawt FC (loan)	4	(0)
- * Club domestic league appearances and goals as of August 16, 2025

Eric James Lajeunesse (born March 10, 2003) is a Canadian soccer player who plays for Pacific FC in the Canadian Premier League.

== Early life ==
From 2011 to 2021, he played with the Ottawa St. Anthony Futuro Academy. In 2019, he had a five-week trial with English club Plymouth Argyle's U18 team. In September 2021, he joined the Vancouver Whitecaps academy.

== University career ==
In 2022, Lajeunesse began attending the University of British Columbia, where he played for the men's soccer team. While at UBC, he pursued a biology degree. On September 25, 2022, he scored his first goal in a 4-0 victory over the Saskatchewan Huskies. In his rookie season, he was named the Canada West Rookie of the Year and the U Sports Rookie of the Year. In 2023, he was named to both the Canada West and U Sports First Team All-Stars. In 2024, he was named to the U Sports All-Tournament Team. In 2025, he was named the Canada West Defensive Player of the Year, and named a Canada West First Team All Star and U Sports First Team All-Canadian.

== Club career ==
In 2022, he played with the Whitecaps FC Academy in League1 British Columbia. He made his debut on May 22 against Victoria Highlanders FC.

At the 2023 CPL-U Sports Draft, Lajeunesse was selected in the first round (6th overall) by Pacific FC. After attending pre-season with the club, he signed a U-Sports development contract with the club in April 2023, allowing him to maintain his university eligibility. He made his professional debut on April 21 in a 2023 Canadian Championship match against Cavalry FC. He also spent some time on loan with Pacific's League1 British Columbia affiliate Nautsa’mawt FC in 2023. In August 2023, he departed the club to return to university, per the terms of his U Sports contract. Pacific subsequently chose to retain his rights for the following season. In April 2024, he signed another U Sports contract with the club for the 2024 season. He again departed the club in August 2024 to return to university with the club retaining his rights for 2025. In February 2025, he re-signed with the club on another U Sports contract. In August 2025, he again departed the club to return to university, as per the terms of his U Sports contract, with the club retaining his rights for the 2026 season. In April 2026, he signed another U Sports contract for the 2026 season.

== Career statistics ==
As of August 17, 2025

Club	Season	League			Playoffs		Domestic Cup		Other		Total	
Club	Season	Division	Apps	Goals	Apps	Goals	Apps	Goals	Apps	Goals	Apps	Goals
Whitecaps FC Academy	2022	League1 British Columbia	12	0	–		–		–		12	0
Pacific FC	2023	Canadian Premier League	6	0	0	0	1	0	–		7	0
Pacific FC	2024	Canadian Premier League	14	0	0	0	4	0	–		18	0
Pacific FC	2025	Canadian Premier League	15	0	0	0	1	0	–		16	0
Pacific FC	Total		35	0	0	0	6	0	0	0	41	0
Nautsa’mawt FC (loan)	2023	League1 British Columbia	4	0	–		–		–		0	
Career total			51	0	0	0	6	0	0	0	57	0
