= 2022 League1 British Columbia season =

League1 British Columbia
- Season: 2022
- Dates: May 22 – July 24 (regular season); August 1 (Championship Match)
- Champions: TSS FC Rovers (men); Vancouver Whitecaps Girls Elite (women)
- Juan de Fuca Plate: Varsity FC

The 2022 League1 British Columbia season was the inaugural season of play for League1 British Columbia, a pro-am league in the Canadian soccer league system. The league is the highest level of soccer based in the Canadian province of British Columbia except for fully professional clubs in the Canadian Premier League and Major League Soccer. Seven clubs participated in the 2022 season in both the men's and women's divisions.

TSS FC Rovers defeated Varsity FC in the final to win the inaugural men's title and qualify for the 2023 Canadian Championship, while the Whitecaps FC Girls Elite Academy also defeated Varsity in the final to win the inaugural women's title. Varsity FC represented the league at the Women's Interprovincial Championship, finishing in fourth place. Varsity FC captured the Juan de Fuca Plate as the combined table leaders across the men's and women's divisions.

== Format ==
The regular season was contested by seven clubs and ran from May 22 to July 24, 2022. Each team played 12 games in a double round-robin format with six games at home and six on the road. The top-two teams advanced to the Championship Final, held on the BC Day long weekend. The men's and women's divisions used identical schedules with the two matches being played as double-headers on the same day.

== Men's division ==
The teams played each other team twice (home and away) for a 12 game season, with the top two teams facing each other in a championship final. The winner of the men's division qualified for the 2023 Canadian Championship.

=== League table ===
Pos	Team	Pld	W	D	L	GF	GA	GD	Pts	Qualification
1	Varsity FC	12	9	1	2	27	13	+14	28	Championship Final
2	TSS FC Rovers (C)	12	6	4	2	24	15	+9	22	Championship Final
3	Whitecaps FC Academy	12	4	4	4	22	23	−1	16	
4	Altitude FC	12	4	2	6	14	20	−6	14	
5	Rivers FC	12	3	4	5	12	16	−4	13	
6	Unity FC	12	3	3	6	14	19	−5	12	
7	Victoria Highlanders FC	12	3	2	7	18	25	−7	11	

Source: Standings
Rules for classification: 1) points; 2) total wins; 3) goal differential; 4) most goals
(C) Champions

==== Championship final ====
August 1, 2022
4:00 pm PT

Varsity FC	1–1	TSS FC Rovers
Shumbusho 56'	Report	Jones 14' (pen.)
Penalties
Clarke (penalty scored); Kaiser (penalty scored); Dzikowski (penalty scored); Nkoghe (penalty scored); Shumbusho (penalty missed)	4–5	(penalty scored) Jones; (penalty scored) Edwardson; (penalty scored) Talisuna; (penalty scored) O'Hea; (penalty scored) Escobar

Swangard Stadium, Burnaby

=== Results table ===
Home \ Away	ALT	RIV	TSS	UNI	VAR	VIC	WFC
Altitude FC		0–2	3–1	1–0	1–3	3–0	0–3
Rivers FC	1–1		0–4	0–1	2–1	2–0	1–1
TSS FC Rovers	0–0	0–0		1–1	0–2	4–0	4–4
Unity FC	2–4	2–0	2–3		0–2	2–1	0–1
Varsity FC	1–0	2–1	1–2	2–2		3–0	5–2
Victoria Highlanders FC	3–0	2–1	2–3	2–2	2–3		4–0
Whitecaps FC Academy	4–1	2–2	0–2	2–0	1–2	2–2	

Updated to match(es) played on June 28, 2022. Source: "2022 Regular Season Schedule League1 BC" (PDF).
Legend: Blue = home team win; Yellow = draw; Red = away team win.

=== Fixtures ===
May 22–28

May 22, 2022	Whitecaps Academy	2–2	Victoria Highlanders	UBC Point Grey Campus
3:30pm	Peña 51'; Tome 74'	Report	Sagaste 10'; Gysbers 27'	Stadium: Ken Woods Field; Referee: Seyed-Mohamad Mohseni

May 22, 2022	Rivers FC	1–1	Altitude FC	Kamloops
4:30pm	Sagno 90+3' (pen.)	Report	Bangambee 45'	Stadium: Hillside Stadium

May 22, 2022	TSS Rovers	1–1	Unity FC	Burnaby
5:30pm	O'Hea 56'		Vukaj 42'	Stadium: Swangard Stadium

May 26, 2022	Unity FC	0–2	Varsity FC	Langley
8:00pm		Report	Mrazek 16'; Clarke 84'	Stadium: Chase Office Field

May 29–June 4

May 29, 2022	Rivers FC	0–4	TSS Rovers	Kamloops
2:00pm		Report	Edwardson 16', 42', 57' (pen.); Davidson 74'	Stadium: Hillside Stadium

May 29, 2022	Altitude FC	0–3	Whitecaps Academy	North Vancouver
3:30pm		Report	Sangha 2', 11', 83' (pen.)	Stadium: Kinsmen Field; Referee: David Schmidt-Schweda

June 1, 2022	Whitecaps Academy	2–0	Unity FC	UBC Point Grey Campus
8:30pm	Peña 10'; Mann 89'	Report		Stadium: Ken Woods Field; Referee: Niko Jecanski

June 3, 2022	TSS Rovers	0–0	Rivers FC	Burnaby
8:30pm		Report		Stadium: Swangard Stadium

June 4, 2022	Varsity FC	3–0	Victoria Highlanders	UBC Point Grey Campus
1:00pm	Clarke 32'; Fussell 79'; Richardson 82'	Report		Stadium: Thunderbird Stadium

June 5–11

June 5, 2022	Altitude FC	0–2	Rivers FC	North Vancouver
1:00pm		Report	Sagno 35'; Yousef 57' (pen.)	Stadium: Kinsmen Field; Referee: Joey Ratcliffe
Note: Altitude FC manager Faly Basse was sent off (red card) at full time for confronting the match officials.

June 5, 2022	Unity FC	2–3	TSS Rovers	Langley
3:00pm	Powell 71'; McBride (o.g.)	Report 1 Report 2	Joseph 12'; Davidson 31' (pen.), 61'	Stadium: Chase Office Field

June 5, 2022	Victoria Highlanders	4–0	Whitecaps Academy	Saanich
4:00pm	Koch 20'; Nijjar 22'; Behery 45+1'; Gysbers 66' (pen.)	Report		Stadium: Centennial Stadium; Referee: David Schmidt-Schweda

June 7, 2022	Varsity FC	1–0	Altitude FC	UBC Point Grey Campus
7:45pm	Chung 77'	Report		Stadium: Rashpal Dhillon Field

June 12–18

June 12, 2022	Varsity FC	2–1	Rivers FC	UBC Point Grey Campus
1:00pm	Clarke 71', 75' (pen.)		Izett 40'	Stadium: Thunderbird Stadium

June 12, 2022	Whitecaps Academy	0–2	TSS Rovers	UBC Point Grey Campus
3:00pm		Report	Mejia 12'; Edwardson 21'	Stadium: Ken Woods Field; Referee: Joey Ratcliffe

June 12, 2022	Victoria Highlanders	3–0	Altitude FC	Saanich
5:00pm	Henman 27'; Cole 77'; Greaves 88'			Stadium: Centennial Stadium

June 15, 2022	Whitecaps Academy	4–1	Altitude FC	UBC Point Grey Campus
8:30pm	Album 23', 40'; Manetta 60'; Sangha 67'	Report	Savane 19'	Stadium: Ken Woods Field; Referee: Seyed-Mohamad Mohseni

June 16, 2022	Varsity FC	2–2	Unity FC	UBC Point Grey Campus
5:30pm	Shumbusho 16'; Rajab Ali 44'		Di Sabatino 14'; Vukaj 90'	Stadium: Rashpal Dhillon Field

June 19–25

June 19, 2022	Altitude FC	1–3	Varsity FC	North Vancouver
1:00pm	Jorges 83'		Zupo 6'; Kovacevic 25', 67'	Stadium: Kinsmen Field

June 19, 2022	Unity FC	2–1	Victoria Highlanders	Langley
3:00pm	Di Sabatino 43'; Rahiem 90+2' (pen.)	Report	36'	Stadium: Chase Office Field

June 19, 2022	Rivers FC	1–1	Whitecaps Academy	Kamloops
3:30pm	Sagno 2'	Report	Peña 15'	Stadium: Hillside Stadium; Referee: Todd Wiseman

June 23, 2022 Ironworkers Derby	TSS Rovers	0–0	Altitude FC	Burnaby
8:30pm				Stadium: Swangard Stadium

June 24, 2022	Varsity FC	5–2	Whitecaps Academy	UBC Point Grey Campus
5:30pm	Clarke 17', 60', 75'; Zupo 65'; Shumbusho 71'	Report	Album 18', 84'	Stadium: Thunderbird Stadium; Referee: Joshua Heuving

June 26–July 2

June 26, 2022	Unity FC	2–0	Rivers FC	Langley
3:00pm	Di Sabatino 8'; Powell 90+2'	Report		Stadium: Chase Office Field

June 26, 2022	Victoria Highlanders	2–3	TSS Rovers	Saanich
3:00pm	31'; Nakabayashi 90'		43'; 47'; 58'	Stadium: Centennial Stadium

June 29, 2022	Unity FC	0–1	Whitecaps Academy	Langley
8:00pm		Report	Mann 38'	Stadium: Chase Office Field

June 29, 2022 Ironworkers Derby	Altitude FC	3–1	TSS Rovers	North Vancouver
8:30pm				Stadium: Kinsmen Field

July 2, 2022	Rivers FC	2–0	Victoria Highlanders	Kamloops
5:30pm	Sagno 45' (pen.); Hooper 76'			Stadium: Hillside Stadium

July 3–July 9

July 3, 2022	Varsity FC	1–2	TSS Rovers	UBC Point Grey Campus
1:00pm				Stadium: Thunderbird Stadium

July 3, 2022	Unity FC	2–4	Altitude FC	Langley
3:00pm				Stadium: Chase Office Field

July 9, 2022	Victoria Highlanders	2–3	Varsity FC	Saanich
3:15pm	Henman 7', 49'		Fisher 7'; Kaiser 28'; Clarke 51'	Stadium: Centennial Stadium

July 9, 2022	Rivers FC	0–1	Unity FC	Kamloops
4:30pm				Stadium: McArthur Island Field 2
Note: Venue was changed to McArthur Island to showcase League1 BC for players, coaches, referees, and spectators involved in BC Soccer's 2022 Les Sinnott Memorial Boys Provincial Cup.

July 10–July 17

July 10, 2022	Whitecaps Academy	1–2	Varsity FC	UBC Point Grey Campus
3:00pm	Norman 24'	Report	Jhutty 43'; Gardner 59'	Stadium: Ken Woods Field

July 10, 2022	TSS Rovers	4–0	Victoria Highlanders	Burnaby
4:30pm				Stadium: Swangard Stadium

July 13, 2022	TSS Rovers	4–4	Whitecaps Academy	Burnaby
8:30pm	MacMillan 34'; Talisuna 43'; Escobar 57'; Edwardson 65'	Report	Tome 45'; Manetta 46'; Sangha 76', 90'	Stadium: Swangard Stadium

July 16, 2022	Rivers FC	2–1	Varsity FC	Kamloops
1:00pm	Hansen 67', 73'		90'	Stadium: Hillside Stadium

July 16, 2022	Victoria Highlanders	2–2	Unity FC	Saanich
3:15pm	Sagaste 58'		Roxburgh 54'; T.Powell 83'	Stadium: Centennial Stadium

July 17, 2022	Altitude FC	3–0	Victoria Highlanders	North Vancouver
1:00pm	Habibullah 12'; Rafael 56'; Savane 84'			Stadium: Kinsmen Field

July 19–July 24

July 19, 2022	TSS Rovers	0–2	Varsity FC	Burnaby
8:30pm			Dzikowski 54'; Choi 65' (o.g.)	Stadium: Swangard Stadium

July 22, 2022	Whitecaps Academy	2–2	Rivers FC	UBC Point Grey Campus
8:30pm	Manetta 63'; Album 75'	Report	Banton 34'; Hooper 90'	Stadium: Ken Woods Field; Referee: Joshua Heuving

July 24, 2022	Altitude FC	1–0	Unity FC	North Vancouver
1:00pm	Habibullah			Stadium: Kinsmen Field

July 24, 2022	Victoria Highlanders	2–1	Rivers FC	Saanich
2:15pm	Koch 58'; Behery 64'	Report	Banton 90+2'	Stadium: Centennial Stadium

== Women's division ==
The winner of the women's division qualified for the Interprovincial Championship.

=== League table ===
Pos	Team	Pld	W	D	L	GF	GA	GD	Pts	Qualification
1	Varsity FC	12	11	0	1	31	7	+24	33	Championship Final
2	Whitecaps FC Girls Elite Academy (C)	12	8	1	3	22	15	+7	25	Championship Final
3	Unity FC	12	8	0	4	26	15	+11	24	
4	TSS FC Rovers	12	6	3	3	22	15	+7	21	
5	Victoria Highlanders FC	12	3	1	8	17	25	−8	10	
6	Altitude FC	12	1	2	9	11	26	−15	5	
7	Rivers FC	12	1	1	10	12	38	−26	4	

Source: Standings
Rules for classification: 1) points; 2) total wins; 3) goal differential; 4) most goals
(C) Champions

==== Championship final ====
August 1, 2022
1:00 pm PT

Varsity FC	1–2	Vancouver Whitecaps Girls Elite
Baxter 1'	Report	Oching 84'; Hernandez-Gray 89'

Swangard Stadium, Burnaby
Referee: Hannah Browning

=== Results table ===
Home \ Away	ALT	RIV	TSS	UNI	VAR	VIC	WFC
Altitude FC	—	1–1	3–3	1–6	0–1	0–1	1–2
Rivers FC	2–0	—	0–3	2–3	1–4	1–4	0–3
TSS FC Rovers	1–0	7–2	—	1–2	0–4	1–0	2–0
Unity FC	2–1	3–1	1–2	—	0–2	2–1	2–0
Varsity FC	3–0	3–0	1–0	1–3	—	3–2	3–0
Victoria Highlanders FC	2–3	5–1	1–1	0–3	0–2	—	0–3
Vancouver Whitecaps Girls Elite	2–1	2–1	1–1	1–0	1–4	5–1	—

Source: "2022 Regular Season Schedule League1 BC" (PDF).
Legend: Blue = home team win; Yellow = draw; Red = away team win.

=== Fixtures ===
May 22–28

May 22, 2022	Vancouver Whitecaps Girls Elite	5–1	Victoria Highlanders	UBC Point Grey Campus
1:00pm	Hauer 27', 51'; Hernandez Gray 42'; Roberts 67'; Perrault 89'	Report	Miranda 46'	Stadium: Ken Woods Field; Referee: Dustin Dewan

May 22, 2022	Rivers FC	2–0	Altitude FC	Kamloops
2:00pm	Clark; Curts	Report		Stadium: Hillside Stadium

May 22, 2022	TSS Rovers	1–2	Unity FC	Burnaby
3:00pm	Roque 52'	Report	Tupper 29'; Crowther 48'	Stadium: Swangard Stadium

May 26, 2022	Unity FC	0–2	Varsity FC	Langley
6:00pm		Report	Ward 35'; Shergill 83'	Stadium: Chase Office Field

May 29–June 4

May 29, 2022	Altitude FC	1–2	Vancouver Whitecaps Girls Elite	North Vancouver
1:00pm	Hughes-Goyette 71'	Report	Roberts 12'; Ahern 28'	Stadium: Kinsmen Field; Referee: Seyed-Mohamad Mohsein

May 29, 2022	Rivers FC	0–3	TSS Rovers	Kamloops
4:30pm		Report	Athwal; Merk	Stadium: Hillside Stadium

June 1, 2022	Vancouver Whitecaps Girls Elite	1–0	Unity FC	UBC Point Grey Campus
6:00pm	Roberts 60'	Report		Stadium: Ken Woods Field; Referee: Sydney Berridge

June 3, 2022	TSS Rovers	7–2	Rivers FC	Burnaby
6:00pm	Athwal 25'; Aitchison 34', 60', 62'; Streicek 36'; Ye 50', 84'	Report	Clark 67'; Curts 71'	Stadium: Swangard Stadium

June 4, 2022	Varsity FC	3–2	Victoria Highlanders	UBC Point Grey Campus
3:15pm	Regan 11'; Tolnai 38'; Damian 41'	Report	Kilby 24', 27'	Stadium: Thunderbird Stadium

June 5–11

June 5, 2022	Altitude FC	1–1	Rivers FC	North Vancouver
3:30pm	Kell 7' (pen.)	Report	Vande Vegte 31' (o.g.)	Stadium: Kinsmen Field

June 5, 2022	Unity FC	1–2	TSS Rovers	Langley
1:00pm	Wardope 77'	Report	Ye 35'; Bishop 67' (pen.)	Stadium: Chase Office Field

June 5, 2022	Victoria Highlanders	0–3	Vancouver Whitecaps Girls Elite	Saanich
2:00pm		Report	Hauer 34'; Roberts 51'; Logan 53'	Stadium: Centennial Stadium

June 7, 2022	Varsity FC	3–0	Altitude FC	UBC Point Grey Campus
5:30pm	Steer 31', 90+2'; Ferreira 78'	Report		Stadium: Rashpal Dhillon Field

June 12–18

June 12, 2022	Vancouver Whitecaps Girls Elite	1–1	TSS Rovers	UBC Point Grey Campus
12:00pm	Perreault 56'	Report	Pante 45'	Stadium: Ken Woods Field; Referee: Fil De Carvalo

June 12, 2022	Victoria Highlanders	2–3	Altitude FC	Saanich
3:00pm	Faulkner 9'; Krautner 51'	Report	Hughes-Goyette 21'; Morrell 45+1'; Campbell 49'	Stadium: Centennial Stadium

June 12, 2022	Varsity FC	3–0	Rivers FC	UBC Point Grey Campus
3:30pm	Regan 11'; Shergill; Tomé 87'	Report		Stadium: Thunderbird Stadium

June 15, 2022	Vancouver Whitecaps Girls Elite	2–1	Altitude FC	UBC Point Grey Campus
6:00pm	Ahern 19'; Hauer 45+1'	Report	Campbell 90+2'	Stadium: Ken Woods Field; Referee: Stephen Leberchthausen

June 16, 2022	Varsity FC	1–3	Unity FC	UBC Point Grey Campus
7:45pm	Erhardsen 25'	Report	Dieterich 41'; Tyrer 47' (o.g.); Van den Brink 70'	Stadium: Rashpal Dhillon Field

June 19–25

June 19, 2022	Rivers FC	0–3	Vancouver Whitecaps Girls Elite	Kamloops
1:00pm		Report	Perrault 12'; Hauer 62'; Blundell 90'	Stadium: Hillside Stadium; Referee: Todd Wiseman

June 19, 2022	Unity FC	2–1	Victoria Highlanders	Langley
1:00pm	James 46'; Dieterich 61'	Report	Vance 70' (o.g.)	Stadium: Chase Office Field

June 19, 2022	Altitude FC	0–1	Varsity FC	North Vancouver
3:30pm		Report	Tomé 90+4'	Stadium: Kinsmen Field

June 23, 2022 Ironworkers Derby	TSS Rovers	1–0	Altitude FC	Burnaby
6:00pm	Athwal 87'	Report		Stadium: Swangard Stadium

June 24, 2022	Varsity FC	3–0	Vancouver Whitecaps Girls Elite	UBC Point Grey Campus
7:45pm	Hernandez Gray 4' (o.g.); Lehal 14'; Tolnai 37'	Report		Stadium: Thunderbird Stadium; Referee: Sydney Barridge

June 26 – July 2

June 26, 2022	Unity FC	3–1	Rivers FC	Langley
1:00pm	Dieterich 10'; Pedersen 58'; Harvey 90+3'		Clark 32'	Stadium: Chase Office Field

June 26, 2022	Victoria Highlanders	1–1	TSS Rovers	Saanich
1:00pm	Solsberg 38'		Downing 10'	Stadium: Centennial Stadium

June 29, 2022 Ironworkers Derby	Altitude FC	3–3	TSS Rovers	North Vancouver
5:00pm			Downing (pen.); Aitchison; Bishop	Stadium: Kinsmen Field

June 29, 2022	Unity FC	1–2	Vancouver Whitecaps Girls Elite	Langley
6:00pm	Kimwemwe 54'; Roberts 60'	Report	Corneil 64'	Stadium: Chase Office Field

July 2, 2022	Rivers FC	1–4	Victoria Highlanders	Kamloops
8:00pm	Grether 57'		Kilbey 6'; 18'; Teetzen 37'; 67'	Stadium: Hillside Stadium

July 3–July 9

July 3, 2022	Unity FC	2–1	Altitude FC	Langley
1:00pm				Stadium: Chase Office Field

July 3, 2022	Varsity FC	1–0	TSS Rovers	UBC Point Grey Campus
3:30pm	Ward 55'	Report		Stadium: Thunderbird Stadium

July 9, 2022	Victoria Highlanders	0–2	Varsity FC	Saanich
1:00pm			Tolnai 27'; Tomé 89'	Stadium: Centennial Stadium

July 9, 2022	Rivers FC	2–3	Unity FC	Kamloops
1:00pm	30'; 79'		Harvey 52'; Hicks 53'; Stewart 72'	Stadium: McArthur Island Field 2
Note: Venue was changed to McArthur Island to showcase League1 BC for players, coaches, referees, and spectators involved in BC Soccer's 2022 Les Sinnott Memorial Boys Provincial Cup.

July 10–July 17

July 10, 2022	TSS Rovers	1–0	Victoria Highlanders	Burnaby
1:00pm	Bishop			Stadium: Swangard Stadium

July 10, 2022	Vancouver Whitecaps Girls Elite	1–4	Varsity FC	UBC Point Grey Campus
12:00pm	Bergen 21'	Report	Erhardsen 31'; Baxter 45', 45+1', 87'	Stadium: Ken Woods Field

July 13, 2022	TSS Rovers	2–0	Vancouver Whitecaps Girls Elite	Burnaby
6:00pm	Roque 32'; Ye 48'	Report		Stadium: Swangard Stadium

July 16, 2022	Victoria Highlanders	0–3	Unity FC	Saanich
1:00pm			T.Hicks 18'; Harvey 30'; Virk 80'	Stadium: Centennial Stadium

July 16, 2022	Rivers FC	1–4	Varsity FC	Kamloops
3:30pm	Tulloch 90'		Tolnai 10'; Baxter 37'; Ward 45' (pen.); Damian 76'	Stadium: Hillside Stadium

July 17, 2022	Altitude FC	0–1	Victoria Highlanders	North Vancouver
3:30pm				Stadium: Kinsmen Field

July 19–July 24

July 19, 2022	TSS Rovers	0–4	Varsity FC	Burnaby
6:00pm			Erhardsen 25'; Baxter 30' (pen.); Tolnai 35', 38'	Stadium: Swangard Stadium

July 22, 2022	Vancouver Whitecaps Girls Elite	2–1	Rivers FC	UBC Point Grey Campus
6:00pm	Hauer 25' (pen.); Gibson 42'	Report	Tulloch 90' (pen.)	Stadium: Ken Woods Field; Referee: Stephen Lebrechtausen

July 24, 2022	Altitude FC	1–6	Unity FC	North Vancouver
3:30pm	A. Hughes-Goyette 75'	Report	10' (o.g.); 16'; E.Hicks 29' (pen.); Virk 46'; 67'; 85'	Stadium: Kinsmen Field

July 24, 2022	Victoria Highlanders	5–1	Rivers FC	Saanich
12:00pm	31' (o.g.); S. Swift 32'; 33' (o.g.); Kilbey 38'; Kraeutner 90'		Miljanovic 19'	Stadium: Centennial Stadium

== Juan de Fuca Plate ==
The Juan de Fuca Plate was historically awarded to the top British Columbia-based team in Premier Development League based on matches played between the BC clubs. With the creation of League1 British Columbia, it was decided that the trophy would be awarded to the League1 British Columbia club with the highest combined point total between the men's and women's divisions in regular season matches.

Pos	Team	Pld	W	D	L	GF	GA	GD	Pts
1	Varsity FC (C)	24	20	1	3	58	20	+38	61
2	TSS FC Rovers	24	12	7	5	46	30	+16	43
3	Whitecaps FC Academy	24	12	5	7	44	38	+6	41
4	Unity FC	24	11	3	10	40	34	+6	36
5	Victoria Highlanders FC	24	6	3	15	35	50	−15	21
6	Altitude FC	24	5	4	15	25	46	−21	19
7	Rivers FC	24	4	5	15	24	54	−30	17

Source: Juan de Fuca Plate
(C) Champions
