= Gabriel Escobar =

Gabriel Escobar may refer to:

- Gabriel Escobar (footballer), Salvadoran footballer
- Gabriel Escobar (boxer), Spanish boxer
