= Burnaby FC =

Semi-professional soccer club

- Full name: Burnaby Football Club
- Founded: 2023; 3 years ago
- Stadium: Burnaby Lake Sports Complex West
- Head Coach: Joe Zupo & Adriano Clemente (men); Kat Tomic (women)
- League: British Columbia Premier League
- 2025: L1BC, 4th (men); L1BC, 8th (women)
- Website: www.burnabyfc.com
Home colours	Away colours

Burnaby Football Club is a Canadian semi-professional soccer club based in Burnaby, British Columbia that plays in the British Columbia Premier League.

== History ==
Burnaby FC was founded in 2023, through the merger of five youth clubs (Cliff Avenue United FC, Mountain United FC, Wesburn FC, Burnaby Girls SC and Burnaby District Metro Soccer). In announcing their inaugural logo, the five wings represent each of the five clubs from the merger. In the club's inaugural year, their U17 boys and U17 girls BCSPL teams both won the Canadian national title.

In February 2024, it was announced that the club would enter senior teams in the semi-professional League1 British Columbia in both the men's and women's divisions.

== Seasons ==
=== Men ===
Season	League	Teams	Record	Rank	Playoffs	Juan de Fuca Plate	Ref
2024	League1 British Columbia	7	1–3–8	7th	did not qualify	5th (Note: The Juan de Fuca Plate is a combined men's and women's competition that combines both squads results)	
2025	League1 British Columbia	9	7–5–4	4th	–	6th	

=== Women ===
Season	League	Teams	Record	Rank	Playoffs	Juan de Fuca Plate	Ref
2024	League1 British Columbia	7	6–2–4	3rd	Semi-finals	5th (Note: The Juan de Fuca Plate is a combined men's and women's competition that combines both squads results)	
2025	League1 British Columbia	9	3–3–10	8th	–	6th	

== Notable players ==
The following players have either played at the professional or international level, either before or after playing for the League1 BC team:

Men

- (Canada) Nicolas Apostol
- (Canada) Emiliano Brienza
- (Canada) Daniel Kaiser
- (Canada) Simone Masi
- (Barbados) Emile Saimovici
- (Canada) Joe Zupo

Women

- (Canada) Mia Pante
- (Panama) (Canada) Yvamara Rodríguez
- (Canada) Holly Ward
