= Whitecaps FC Academy =

Youth soccer club in Vancouver, British Columbia

- Founded: 2007
- Stadium: Ken Woods Field; University of British Columbia
- Head coach: Dan Lenarduzzi (men); Katie Collar (women)
- League: British Columbia Premier League
- 2025: L1BC, 8th (men)

Whitecaps FC Academy (sponsor name Whitecaps FC BMO Academy) is the youth system of the professional soccer club Vancouver Whitecaps, based in Vancouver, British Columbia. It fields a men's and women's team in the semi-professional British Columbia Premier League.

== Men's ==
The men's academy is officially named the Vancouver Whitecaps FC MLS Academy. It is a full-time, fully funded, player development program. Originally known as the Vancouver Whitecaps Residency programs, they changed their name in 2018 to the Whitecaps FC Academy. They have affiliations with youth soccer clubs across Canada, forming part of the Whitecaps FC BMO Academy.

=== Seasons ===
| Season | League | Teams | Record | Rank | Playoffs | Top scorer | Ref |
|---|---|---|---|---|---|---|---|
| 2022 | League1 British Columbia | 7 | 4–4–4 | 3rd | did not qualify | Gurman Sangha (6) | |
| 2023 | League1 British Columbia | 8 | 5–7–2 | 3rd | Champions | Michael Hennessy (7) | |
| 2024 | League1 British Columbia | 7 | 5–4–3 | 3rd | Semi-finals | 3 players (4) | |
| 2025 | League1 British Columbia | 9 | 4–2–10 | 8th | —N/a | Kyler Vojvodic (7) | |
| 2026 | British Columbia Premier League | 8 | 7–1–6 | 3rd | —N/a | Chris Album (13) | |

== Women's ==
The women's academy is officially named the Vancouver Whitecaps FC Girls Elite Academy. In 2015, the Canadian Soccer Association partnered with the BC Soccer Association and the Vancouver Whitecaps FC to launch its regional EXCEL program which will be run as part of the Whitecaps FC Academy.

In 2021, it was announced that the program would join the semi-professional League1 British Columbia as a founding franchise for the 2022 season. Their home games will take place at Ken Woods Field at the National Soccer Development Centre. They played their debut match on May 22, defeating the Victoria Highlanders 5-1.

During the 2022 regular season, the Whitecaps managed to finish second in the regular season standings and qualified for the Championship final, despite many of their university age players having to depart the team before the end of the season, leaving them with a roster composed of 14-17 year old players. In the Championship Final, the Whitecaps Girls defeated Varsity FC to win the inaugural women's League1 British Columbia title. In May 2023, the team participated in the 2023 Blue Stars/FIFA Youth Cup, winning the title. In the 2023 L1BC season, they won the league double, capturing the regular season title and the playoff championship, advancing to the Women's Inter-Provincial Championship, which they also won to become the overall League1 Canada champions. In 2024, they once again won the League1 BC title to advance to the Inter-Provincial Championship again, winning the overall League1 Canada title for the second consecutive year.

=== Seasons ===
| Season | League | Teams | Record | Rank | Playoffs | National / continental | | Ref |
|---|---|---|---|---|---|---|---|---|
| 2022 | League1 British Columbia | 7 | 8–1–3 | 2nd | Champions | withdrew | | |
| 2023 | League1 British Columbia | 8 | 11–1–2 | 1st | Champions | Blue Stars/FIFA Youth Cup | Champions | |
| 2023 | League1 British Columbia | 8 | 11–1–2 | 1st | Champions | Inter-Provincial Championship | Champions | |
| 2024 | League1 British Columbia | 7 | 10–2–0 | 1st | Champions | Inter-Provincial Championship | Champions | |
| 2024 | League1 British Columbia | 7 | 10–2–0 | 1st | Champions | CONCACAF W Champions Cup | Group stage | |

== Professional players from the Whitecaps FC Academy ==
As of November 10, 2026

| Name | Most recent pro club | Birth year | First team appearances |
|---|---|---|---|
| (Saint Vincent and the Grenadines) Cornelius Stewart | (Indonesia) PS Barito Putera | 1989 | 21 |
| (Jamaica) Evan Taylor | (Jamaica) Chapelton Maroons | 1989 | - |
| (Canada) Philippe Davies^{RET} (HG) | (Canada) Ottawa Fury FC | 1990 | 34 |
| (Canada) Randy Edwini-Bonsu^{RET} | (Canada) FC Edmonton | 1990 | 36 |
| (Jamaica) Dever Orgill | (Cyprus) Doğan Türk Birliği | 1990 | 16 |
| (Canada) Kyle Porter^{RET} | (Canada) FC Edmonton | 1990 | 5 |
| (Canada) Alex Semenets^{RET} | (Canada) FC Edmonton | 1990 | 3 |
| (Jamaica) Keithy Simpson^{RET} | (Jamaica) Dunbeholden F.C. | 1990 | - |
| (Canada) Adam Straith^{RET} | (Germany) Hansa Rostock | 1990 | - |
| (Canada) Simon Thomas | (Norway) Tromsø IL | 1990 | 1 |
| (Canada) Jerome Baker | (Singapore) Hougang United FC | 1991 | - |
| (Malaysia) La'Vere Corbin-Ong | (Malaysia) Johor Darul Ta'zim | 1991 | 0 |
| (Canada) Ethan Gage | (Australia) Caroline Springs George Cross FC | 1991 | 42 |
| (Canada) Julien Latendresse-Levessque^{RET} | (Germany) BSG Chemie Leipzig | 1991 | - |
| (India) Sahil Sandhu^{RET} | (Canada) Whitecaps FC 2 | 1991 | - |
| (United States) Joseph Gyau | (United States) Las Vegas Lights FC | 1992 | - |
| (Jamaica) Kemar Lawrence | (United States) Westchester SC | 1992 | - |
| (Haiti) Brian Sylvestre^{RET} (HG) | (United States) Miami FC | 1992 | 0 |
| (Canada) Russell Teibert^{RET} (HG) | (Canada) Vancouver Whitecaps FC | 1992 | 301 |
| (Canada) Charlie Trafford^{RET} | (Canada) Cavalry FC | 1992 | - |
| (Canada) Caleb Clarke^{RET} (HG) | (Germany) FC Amberg | 1993 | 2 |
| (Canada) Ben Fisk^{RET} | (Canada) Vancouver FC | 1993 | - |
| (Canada) Callum Irving | (Canada) Vancouver FC | 1993 | - |
| (Canada) Ben McKendry^{RET} (HG) | (Canada) Atlético Ottawa | 1993 | 7 |
| (United States) Charles Renken^{RET} | (United States) Seattle Sounders 2 | 1993 | - |
| (South Africa) Ethen Sampson (HG) | (South Africa) Black Leopards F.C. | 1993 | 7 |
| (Canada) Bryce Alderson^{RET} (HG) | (Germany) Fortuna Düsseldorf II | 1994 | 2 |
| (Canada) Paris Gee | (Canada) Vancouver FC | 1994 | - |
| (Canada) Sean Melvin (HG) | (Canada) Pacific FC | 1994 | 0 |
| (Canada) Daniel Stanese | (Germany) VfR Aalen | 1994 | - |
| (Canada) Sam Adekugbe (HG) | (Canada) Vancouver Whitecaps FC | 1995 | 79 |
| (Canada) Jackson Farmer^{RET} | (Canada) Whitecaps FC 2 | 1995 | - |
| (Colombia) Carlos Patiño^{RET} | (Canada) Cavalry FC | 1995 | - |
| (Canada) Mitch Piraux^{RET} | (Canada) Whitecaps FC 2 | 1995 | - |
| (Fiji) Nicholas Prasad^{RET} | (Germany) Bischofswerdaer FV 08 | 1995 | - |
| (Canada) Chris Serban^{RET} | (Canada) Cavalry FC | 1995 | - |
| (Canada) Nolan Wirth^{RET} | (Canada) Pacific FC | 1995 | - |
| (England) Elijah Adekugbe | (Australia) Preston Lions FC | 1996 | - |
| (Canada) Marco Bustos (HG) | (Canada) Pacific FC | 1996 | 13 |
| (Canada) Marco Carducci (HG) | (Canada) HFX Wanderers FC | 1996 | 2 |
| (Canada) Alex Comsia^{RET} | (United States) North Carolina FC | 1996 | - |
| (Canada) Kianz Froese (HG) | (Indonesia) Semen Padang | 1996 | 24 |
| (Canada) Jordan Haynes | (Canada) Valour FC | 1996 | 0 |
| (Somalia) Ali Musse | (Canada) Cavalry FC | 1996 | - |
| (Canada) Marcello Polisi | (Canada) Vancouver FC | 1997 | - |
| (Canada) Dario Zanatta | (United States) Tormenta FC | 1997 | - |
| (Tanzania) Gloire Amanda | (Singapore) Hougang United FC | 1998 | 0 |
| (Philippines) Matthew Baldisimo | (Canada) Pacific FC | 1998 | 0 |
| (Canada) Terran Campbell | (Canada) Vancouver FC | 1998 | - |
| (Canada) Kadin Chung | (Canada) Pacific FC | 1998 | - |
| (Canada) Duwayne Ewart | (United States) Pittsburgh Riverhounds | 1998 | - |
| (Canada) Tomi Fagbongbe | (Estonia) Viljandi Tulevik | 1998 | - |
| (Canada) Liam Fraser | (England) Reading FC | 1998 | - |
| (Canada) Thomas Gardner | (Canada) FC Edmonton | 1998 | - |
| (Canada) Ndzemdzela Langwa | (Canada) HFX Wanderers FC | 1998 | - |
| (Canada) Patrick Metcalfe (HG) | (Norway) Hamarkameratene | 1998 | 21 |
| (Canada) David Norman Jr.^{RET} (HG) | (Canada) Vancouver FC | 1998 | 1 |
| (Canada) Matteo Polisi | (Greece) Anagennisi Epanomi | 1998 | - |
| (Canada) Daniel Sagno | (Australia) Glenorchy Knights FC | 1998 | - |
| (Canada) Munir Saleh^{RET} | (Canada) York9 FC | 1998 | - |
| (Canada) Zach Verhoven | (Canada) Vancouver FC | 1998 | - |
| (Canada) Nicolas Apostol | (Greece) Anagennisi Epanomi | 1999 | - |
| (Canada) Theo Bair (HG) | (England) Bolton Wanderers FC (on loan from AJ Auxerre) | 1999 | 39 |
| (Mexico) Alan Camacho | (Canada) Whitecaps FC 2 | 1999 | - |
| (Finland) Jonas Häkkinen | (Republic of Ireland) Kerry FC | 1999 | - |
| (Canada) Joel Harrison^{RET} | (Canada) Whitecaps FC 2 | 1999 | - |
| (Canada) Thomas Hasal (HG) | (United States) Los Angeles FC | 1999 | 36 |
| (Canada) Georges Mukumbilwa (HG) | (Canada) Pacific FC | 1999 | 1 |
| (Canada) Noah Verhoeven | (Greece) Makedonikos FC | 1999 | - |
| (Philippines) Michael Baldisimo (HG) | (Canada) Cavalry FC | 2000 | 50 |
| (England) Jude Barrow | (Estonia) JK Viljandi | 2000 | - |
| (Canada) Antony Caceres | (Canada) FC Edmonton | 2000 | - |
| (Canada) Alphonso Davies (HG) | (Germany) Bayern Munich | 2000 | 81 |
| (El Salvador) Gabriel Escobar | (Canada) HFX Wanderers FC | 2000 | - |
| (Peru) Vasco Fry | (Canada) Vancouver FC | 2000 | 1 |
| (Canada) José Hernandez | (Canada) Cavalry FC | 2000 | - |
| (Canada) Alessandro Hojabrpour | (Netherlands) FC Emmen | 2000 | - |
| (Canada) Daniel Kaiser | (Canada) Cavalry FC | 2000 | - |
| (Canada) Devin O'Hea | (Canada) Pacific FC | 2000 | - |
| (Canada) Filip Rakic | (Canada) Whitecaps FC 2 | 2000 | - |
| (Canada) Jake Ruby^{RET} | (Canada) HFX Wanderers FC | 2000 | - |
| (Canada) Gurman Sangha | (United States) Crown Legacy FC | 2000 | - |
| (Canada) Jalen Watson | (Canada) Toronto FC II | 2000 | - |
| (Canada) Isaac Boehmer (HG) | (Canada) Vancouver Whitecaps FC | 2001 | 27 |
| (Canada) Cristian Campagna | (Estonia) JK Narva Trans | 2001 | - |
| (Canada) Chance Carter | (Canada) FC Edmonton | 2001 | - |
| (Canada) T-Boy Fayia | (Canada) FC Edmonton | 2001 | - |
| (Canada) Albert Kang | (Malaysia) Kelantan The Real Warriors | 2001 | - |
| (Poland) Eryk Kobza | (Canada) Cavalry FC | 2001 | - |
| (Canada) Ivan Mejia | (Canada) Vancouver FC | 2001 | - |
| (Zimbabwe) Darlington Murasiranwa | (Zimbabwe) Ngezi Platinum FC | 2001 | - |
| (Canada) Chris Lee^{RET} | (Canada) Whitecaps FC 2 | 2001 | 0 |
| (New Zealand) Thomas Raimbault | (United States) Carolina Core FC | 2001 | - |
| (Canada) Nikolas White^{RET} | (Germany) 1. FC Nürnberg II | 2001 | - |
| (Canada) Owen Antoniuk | (Canada) Cavalry FC | 2002 | - |
| (Canada) Amir Batyrev | (Russia) PFC Sochi | 2002 | - |
| (Canada) Emiliano Brienza | (Canada) Whitecaps FC 2 | 2002 | 1 |
| (Ukraine) Yigal Bruk | (Germany) FC Schalke 04 II | 2002 | - |
| (Canada) Carson Buschman-Dormond | (Malta) Balzan F.C. | 2002 | - |
| (United States) Brandon Cambridge | (United States) Orange County SC | 2002 | - |
| (Canada) Simon Colyn (HG) | (Denmark) Lyngby Boldklub | 2002 | 1 |
| (Canada) Lucas Dasovic | (Canada) Whitecaps FC 2 | 2002 | - |
| (Canada) Matteo de Brienne | (Sweden) GAIS | 2002 | - |
| (Canada) Gianfranco Facchineri (HG) | (Republic of Ireland) Galway United FC | 2002 | 0 |
| (Canada) Massud Habibullah | (United States) Sporting Kansas City II | 2002 | - |
| (Canada) Eric Lajeunesse | (Canada) Pacific FC | 2002 | - |
| (Canada) Simone Masi | (Canada) Whitecaps FC 2 | 2002 | - |
| (United States) Chituru Odunze (HG) | (United States) Phoenix Rising FC (on loan from Charlotte FC) | 2002 | 0 |
| (Canada) Damiano Pecile (HG) | (Canada) Vancouver FC | 2002 | 1 |
| (Canada) Deylen Vellios | (Canada) Whitecaps FC 2 | 2002 | - |
| (Canada) Junior Agyekum | (Canada) Atlético Ottawa | 2003 | - |
| (Canada) Ben Alexander | (Canada) Whitecaps FC 2 | 2003 | 0 |
| (Canada) Paul Amedume | (Canada) Pacific FC | 2003 | - |
| (Canada) Emil Gazdov | (Canada) CF Montréal | 2003 | - |
| (Canada) Kamron Habibullah (HG) | (Canada) Atlético Ottawa | 2003 | 3 |
| (Canada) Joe Hanson | (United States) Athletic Club Boise | 2003 | - |
| (Canada) Jaeden Mercure | (Australia) Launceston United SC | 2003 | - |
| (Philippines) Dale Reas-Do | (Philippines) Aguilas-UMak FC | 2003 | - |
| (Canada) Niko Sigur | (France) Toulouse FC | 2003 | - |
| (Nigeria) Muslim Umar | (Canada) York United FC | 2003 | - |
| (Canada) Eric White | (Canada) Whitecaps FC 2 | 2003 | - |
| (Canada) Theo Afework | (Canada) York United FC | 2004 | - |
| (Canada) Max Anchor (HG) | (United States) Seattle Sounders FC | 2004 | 1 |
| (Canada) Elage Bah | (Canada) Vancouver FC | 2004 | - |
| (Canada) Matteo Campagna (HG) | (Canada) Vancouver FC | 2004 | 1 |
| (Canada) Alesandro Comita | (Slovenia) ND Gorica | 2004 | - |
| (Canada) Kyle Degelman | (India) Chanmari FC | 2004 | - |
| (Canada) Brennen Fuerst | (Canada) Whitecaps FC 2 | 2004 | - |
| (Iran) Amir Ghasemi | (Canada) Whitecaps FC 2 | 2004 | - |
| (New Zealand) Jay Herdman | (Indonesia) Bali United FC | 2004 | 1 |
| (New Zealand) Finn Linder | (Canada) HFX Wanderers FC | 2004 | 1 |
| (Canada) Joshué Ndakala | (Finland) Salon Palloilijat | 2004 | - |
| (Canada) Sydney Wathuta | (United States) Colorado Rapids | 2004 | - |
| (Republic of Ireland) David Ajagbe | (Canada) Whitecaps FC 2 | 2005 | - |
| (Canada) Matheus De Souza | (Canada) Vancouver FC | 2005 | - |
| (Canada) Edwin Espinal | (Canada) Whitecaps FC 2 | 2005 | - |
| (Moldova) Mihail Gherasimencov (HG) | (Canada) Vancouver Whitecaps FC | 2005 | 15 |
| (Canada) Christian Greco-Taylor | (Canada) Pacific FC | 2005 | - |
| (Canada) Niko Myroniuk | (Canada) Cavalry FC | 2005 | - |
| (Canada) Cohen Park | (Canada) Whitecaps FC 2 | 2005 | - |
| (Canada) Lennon Thompson | (Malta) Balzan F.C. | 2005 | - |
| (Canada) Jeevan Badwal (HG) | (Canada) Vancouver Whitecaps FC | 2006 | 66 |
| (Canada) Elijah Bean | (Canada) Whitecaps FC 2 | 2006 | - |
| (Canada) Cristiano Da Silva | (Canada) Whitecaps FC 2 | 2006 | - |
| (China) Aidan Fong | (China) Liaoning Tieren FC | 2006 | - |
| (South Africa) Benjamin Lee | (Canada) Vancouver FC | 2006 | - |
| (Canada) Immanuel Mathe | (Canada) Whitecaps FC 2 | 2006 | - |
| (Canada) Alexander Milošević | (Canada) Whitecaps FC 2 | 2006 | - |
| (Canada) Amoni Thomas | (Canada) Whitecaps FC 2 | 2006 | - |
| (Canada) Kyler Vojvodic | (Canada) Whitecaps FC 2 | 2006 | - |
| (Jamaica) Sahai Williams | (Canada) Whitecaps FC 2 | 2006 | - |
| (Canada) Luka Banovic | (Croatia) HNK Hajduk Split | 2007 | - |
| (Guyana) Mateo Clark | (United States) Chicago Fire FC II | 2007 | - |
| (Canada) Luca Chen | (Canada) Whitecaps FC 2 | 2007 | - |
| (Tunisia) Rayan Elloumi (HG) | (Canada) Vancouver Whitecaps FC | 2007 | 49 |
| (Canada) Liam Mackenzie (HG) | (Canada) HFX Wanderers FC (on loan from Vancouver Whitecaps FC) | 2007 | 1 |
| (Canada) Anyole Peter | (Canada) Whitecaps FC 2 | 2007 | - |
| (Canada) Ben Nash | (Canada) Whitecaps FC 2 | 2007 | - |
| (Canada) Valter Sedin | (Canada) Whitecaps FC 2 | 2007 | 0 |
| (Canada) Francesco Troisi | (Canada) HFX Wanderers FC | 2007 | - |
| (Canada) Sahil Deo | (Canada) Whitecaps FC 2 | 2008 | - |
| (Canada) Isaac Francoeur | (Canada) Whitecaps FC 2 | 2008 | - |
| (Trinidad and Tobago) Dominic Joseph | (Canada) Vancouver FC | 2008 | - |
| (Republic of Ireland) Grady McDonnell | (England) Nottingham Forrest FC | 2008 | - |
| (Canada) Connor Munn | (Canada) Whitecaps FC 2 | 2008 | - |
| (Canada) Antoine Nehme | (Canada) Whitecaps FC 2 | 2008 | - |
| (Canada) Carson Rassak | (Canada) Vancouver FC | 2008 | - |
| (Canada) Charlie Rogers | (Canada) Whitecaps FC 2 | 2008 | - |
| (Canada) Johnny Selemani (HG) | (Canada) Vancouver Whitecaps FC | 2008 | 4 |
| (Canada) Yuma Tsuji | (Canada) Whitecaps FC 2 | 2008 | - |
| (Canada) Aiden Bejaoui | (Canada) Whitecaps FC 2 | 2009 | - |
| (Canada) Tyler Brown | (Canada) Whitecaps FC 2 | 2009 | - |
| (Canada) Liam Campagna | (Canada) Whitecaps FC 2 | 2009 | - |
| (South Korea) Jayden Kim | (Canada) Whitecaps FC 2 | 2009 | - |
| (Canada) Jesse Peace | (Canada) Whitecaps FC 2 | 2009 | - |
| (Canada) Sam Rogers | (Canada) Whitecaps FC 2 | 2009 | - |
| (Canada) Ryder Sewell | (Canada) Whitecaps FC 2 | 2009 | - |
| (Canada) Manav Badwal | (Canada) Whitecaps FC 2 | 2010 | - |
| (Canada) Hunter MacGowan | (Canada) Whitecaps FC 2 | 2010 | - |
