= Daniel Stanese =

Canadian soccer player (born 1994)

Personal information
- Full name: Daniel Victor Stanese
- Date of birth: 21 January 1994 (age 32)
- Place of birth: Queens, New York, U.S.
- Height: 1.85 m (6 ft 1 in)
- Position: Defender

Team information
- Current team: VfB Krieschow
- Number: 20

Youth career
- 2000–2010: Coquitlam Metro-Ford
- 2010–2012: Whitecaps FC Residency
- 2013: 1. FC Nürnberg

College career
Years	Team	Apps	(Gls)
2012	Florida Gulf Coast Eagles	18	(1)

Senior career*
Years	Team	Apps	(Gls)
2013	1. FC Nürnberg II	0	(0)
2013–2016	FC Augsburg II	58	(1)
2016–2018	VfR Aalen	48	(2)
2018–2019	Energie Cottbus	7	(0)
2020	Carl Zeiss Jena	6	(0)
2020–2022	VfR Aalen	49	(5)
2023–	VfB Krieschow	14	(6)

International career^{‡}
2011	Canada U17	7	(0)
2013	Canada U20	3	(0)
2015–	Canada	1	(0)
Medal record
Representing Canada
Runner-up	CONCACAF U-17 Championship	2011
- * Club domestic league appearances and goals as of 8 June 2024 ‡ National team caps and goals as of 20 January 2015

Daniel Victor Stanese (born 21 January 1994) is a professional soccer player who plays as a defender for German NOFV-Oberliga Süd club VfB Krieschow. Born in the United States, he represents Canada internationally.

== Early life ==
Daniel was born to Romanian parents in Queens, New York and his family moved to Coquitlam, British Columbia when he was six months old. His family later moved to Pitt Meadows, British Columbia, where he began playing soccer with Coquitlam Metro-Ford Soccer Club at the age of 5. He speaks Romanian, French, German and English.

== Club career ==
=== Youth, College & Amateur ===
Stanese spent the majority of his youth career with Coquitlam Metro-Ford SC before joining the Vancouver Whitecaps FC Residency program in 2010. He also spent two seasons with Vancouver Whitecaps FC U-23 in the USL Premier Development League.

On 12 May 2012, Stanese signed a letter of intent to play college soccer at Florida Gulf Coast University. In what turned out to be his only season with the Eagles, Stanese made 18 appearances and finished the year with one goal. He went on to be named to the A-Sun All-Freshman team as well as NSCAA All-South Region Second Team.

=== Professional ===
On 25 February 2013, it was announced that Stanese had signed with German Bundesliga side 1. FC Nürnberg. However, his time with the club was cut short and he later joined FC Augsburg where he made 17 appearances for the reserve side in 2013–14.

In October 2016, Stanese signed with VfR Aalen in the German 3. Liga.

After two years with Aalen, Stanese signed a two-year contract with newly promoted club Energie Cottbus.

On 21 January 2020, Stanese joined Carl Zeiss Jena on a deal until the end of the 2019–20 season. Following the club's relegation to Regionalliga, Stanese would be released at the end of the season.

== International career ==
On 19 January 2015, Stanese made his debut for the Canada senior national team. Coming on in the 81st minute for Samuel Piette in a 1–1 draw with Iceland.
