= 2024 Victoria Premier League 2 =

1st season of the Victoria Premier League 2

Victoria Premier League 2
- Season: 2024
- Dates: 8 March – 17 August 2024
- Champions: Melbourne Srbija
- Promoted: Melbourne Srbija; North Sunshine Eagles
- Relegated: Doveton SC; Beaumaris SC
- Matches: 132
- Goals: 424 (3.21 per match)
- Top goalscorer: Prince Jordan Adeyemi (15); Callum Schorah
- Biggest home win: Pascoe Vale 8-1 Beaumaris SC (15 March 2024)
- Biggest away win: Brunswick Juventus 1-6 Altona City (9 August 2024); Doveton SC 0-5 North Sunshine Eagles (9 march 2024)
- Highest scoring: Pascoe Vale 8-1 Beaumaris SC (15 March 2024)
- All statistics correct as of 21 August 2024.

The 2024 Victoria Premier League 2 was the inaugural season of the Victoria Premier League 2 (VPL 2), the third-tier competition of association football in Victoria. The VPL 2, like Victoria Premier League 1 (VPL 1), was established at the end of the 2023 season to replace National Premier Leagues Victoria 3.

The season was won by Melbourne Srbija, who along with North Sunshine Eagles, were promoted to VPL 1. Doveton SC and Beaumaris SC were relegated to Victorian State League Division 1.

== Teams ==
12 teams competed in the 2024 Victoria Premier League 2.

Locations of 2024 Victoria Premier League clubs within metropolitan Melbourne.
Locations of 2024 Victoria Premier League clubs within Victoria.

Club	Location	Grounds	Capacity
Altona City	Altona	HC Kim Reserve	500
Beaumaris	Beaumaris	Beaumaris Reserve	250
Boroondara-Carey Eagles	Bulleen	Carey Bulleen Sports Complex	100
Box Hill United	Box Hill	Wembley Park	1,000
Brunswick Juventus	Fawkner	CB Smith Reserve	2,000
Doveton	Eumemmerring	Waratah Reserve	400
Essendon Royals	Essendon	Cross Keys Reserve	500
Goulburn Valley Suns	Shepparton	John McEwan Reserve	3,200
Melbourne Srbija	Burnley	Kevin Bartlett Reserve	2,500
North Sunshine Eagles	St Albans	Larissa Reserve	500
Nunawading City	Forest Hill	Mahoney's Reserve	1,000
Pascoe Vale	Fawkner	CB Smith Reserve	2,000

== League table ==
Pos	Team	Pld	W	D	L	GF	GA	GD	Pts	Promotion, qualification or relegation
1	Melbourne Srbija	22	14	3	5	40	22	+18	45	Promotion to the VPL 1
2	North Sunshine Eagles	22	11	10	1	52	27	+25	43	Promotion to the VPL 1
3	Altona City	22	11	7	4	37	24	+13	40	
4	Essendon Royals	22	11	5	6	44	31	+13	38	
5	Pascoe Vale	22	11	2	9	42	29	+13	35	
6	Brunswick Juventus	22	10	4	8	34	35	−1	34	
7	Boroondara-Carey Eagles	22	7	7	8	34	39	−5	28	
8	Box Hill United	22	6	6	10	23	31	−8	24	
9	Nunawading City	22	7	3	12	37	46	−9	24	
10	Goulburn Valley Suns	22	6	5	11	40	44	−4	23	
11	Doveton SC	22	6	3	13	22	43	−21	21	Relegation to Victorian State League Division 1
12	Beaumaris SC	22	3	3	16	19	53	−34	12	Relegation to Victorian State League Division 1

Rules for classification: 1) Points; 2) Goal difference; 3) Goals scored

== Statistics ==
=== Top scorers ===
There was two top goal scorers in the 2024 Victoria Premier League 2. The two top scorers were Prince Jordan Adeyemi (20 games), and Callum Schorah (22 games).

Rank	Player	Club	Goals	Games	GPG
1	Prince Jordan Adeyemi	Essendon Royals	15	20	0.75
1	Callum Schorah	Goulburn Valley Suns	15	22	0.68
3	Redouane Sarakh	North Sunshine Eagles	14	19	0.73
4	Luka Ninkovic	Melbourne Srbija	13	19	0.68
5	Ndue Mujeci	North Sunshine Eagles	12	21	0.57

=== Discipline ===
==== Yellow Cards ====
Two players got the most yellow cards in the 2024 Victoria Premier League 2. The two players with the most yellow cards were Felix Dimitrakis (18 games), and Andelo Svalina (19 games).

Rank	Player	Club	YC	Games	YCPG
1	Felix Dimitrakis	Nunawading City	11	18	0.61
1	Andelo Svalina	Altona City	11	19	0.58
3	Hayden Tennant	Pascoe Vale	10	17	0.59
3	Alex Meaney	Boroondara-Carey Eagles	10	20	0.5
5	Michael Romas	Box Hill United	9	16	0.56

==== Red Cards ====
There were three players who got the most red cards in the 2024 Victoria Premier league 2. The three players with the most red cards were Riade Mouyette (17 games), Felix Dimitrakis (18 games), and Sonny Klarica (18 games).

Rank	Player	Club	RC	Games	RCPG
1	Riade Mouyette	North Sunshine Eagles	2	17	0.12
1	Felix Dimitrakis	Nunawading City	2	18	0.11
1	Sonny Klarica	Doveton	2	18	0.11
