= Gabriel Escobar (footballer) =

Salvadoran footballer (born 2000)

Personal information
- Full name: Gabriel Ricardo Escobar Flores
- Date of birth: 4 April 2000 (age 26)
- Place of birth: San Miguel, El Salvador
- Height: 1.75 m (5 ft 9 in)
- Position: Defender

Youth career
- TSS FC Rovers
- Cliff Avenue United
- Vancouver Whitecaps

Senior career*
Years	Team	Apps	(Gls)
2022	TSS FC Rovers		
2022	HFX Wanderers FC	5	(0)
2023–	TSS FC Rovers	16	(0)

International career
2016	Canada U17	2	(0)
2018	El Salvador U20	3	(0)
- * Club domestic league appearances and goals as of July 14, 2024

Gabriel Ricardo Escobar Flores (born 4 April 2000) is a Salvadoran professional footballer who plays for TSS FC Rovers in League1 British Columbia.

== Early life ==
Born in San Miguel, El Salvador, Escobar moved to Vancouver, Canada, at age six. He began playing football with TSS FC Rovers immediately upon arrival in Canada, later joining Cliff Avenue United and the Vancouver Whitecaps Academy.

He played at the amateur adult level with FC Tigers Vancouver.

== Club career ==
In 2022, he joined TSS FC Rovers in League1 British Columbia, being named to the L1BC Team of the Week five times and helping the Rovers win the championship final, where he scored the winning penalty kick in their shootout victory over Varsity FC.

In August 2022, he signed a contract for the remainder of the 2022 season, with club options for 2023 and 2024, with HFX Wanderers FC of the Canadian Premier League. He made five straight appearances for the club, before suffering a season-ending foot injury in a match against York United FC.

In 2023, after having his option declined by the Wanderers, he returned to the TSS FC Rovers for the 2023 season.

== International career ==
In 2014, he was called up by the Canada under-15 team to take part in a training camp. In 2016, he played for the Canada under-17 team in two friendly matches against the United States and was later called-up for matches against Panama and Jamaica. He was nominated for 2016 Canadian U17 Player of the Year, finishing in the top three in voting behind winner Alphonso Davies and Jonathan David.

In 2018, he was called up to the El Salvador under-20 team for the 2018 CONCACAF U-20 Championship, playing in three matches and cap-tying him to El Salvador.

== Career statistics ==
As of August 4, 2024

Club	Season	League			Playoffs		National cup		Continental		Total	
Club	Season	Division	Apps	Goals	Apps	Goals	Apps	Goals	Apps	Goals	Apps	Goals
TSS FC Rovers	2022	League1 British Columbia	?	?	1	0	–		–		1+	0
HFX Wanderers FC	2022	Canadian Premier League	5	0	–		0	0	–		5	0
TSS FC Rovers	2023	League1 British Columbia	9	0	1	0	1	0	–		11	0
TSS FC Rovers	2024	League1 British Columbia	7	0	2	0	0	0	–		9	0
TSS FC Rovers	Total		16	0	3	0	1	0	0	0	20	0
Career total			21+	0	4	0	1	0	0	0	26+	0
