= Christopher Lee (soccer) =

Canadian soccer player

Personal information
- Full name: Christopher Lee
- Date of birth: August 14, 2001 (age 25)
- Place of birth: North Vancouver, British Columbia, Canada
- Height: 1.80 m (5 ft 11 in)
- Position: Defender

Youth career
- West Vancouver SC
- Mountain United SC
- 2015–2020: Vancouver Whitecaps FC

College career
Years	Team	Apps	(Gls)
2021	UBC Thunderbirds	16	(0)
2023–2024	UBC Thunderbirds	41	(9)

Senior career*
Years	Team	Apps	(Gls)
2021	Pacific FC	3	(0)
2022	Whitecaps FC 2	11	(0)
2022	→ Vancouver Whitecaps FC (loan)	0	(0)
2023	Nautsa’mawt FC	11	(0)
- * Club domestic league appearances and goals as of July 15, 2023

Christopher Lee (born August 14, 2001) is a Canadian soccer player who plays as a defender.

== Early life ==
Lee was born in North Vancouver, British Columbia before moving to West Vancouver, British Columbia when he was three, where he began playing youth soccer for West Vancouver SC when he was seven. He later joined Mountain United SC and then joined the Vancouver Whitecaps FC Academy in August 2015.

== College career ==
In 2020, Lee decided to attend the University of British Columbia and join their men's soccer team, although his debut season was cancelled due to the COVID-19 pandemic. In 2021, he won the Canada West title with UBC, was named to the Canada West All-Rookie Team, and was an Academic All-Canadian. In 2023, he won the Canada West Student-Athlete Community Service Award.

== Club career ==
In the 2021 CPL-U Sports Draft, he was selected fifth overall by Pacific FC of the Canadian Premier League. In June 2021, he signed a developmental contract with Pacific for the 2021 season, allowing him to retain his university eligibility. He made his debut on June 26 against the HFX Wanderers. In August 2021, Pacific coach Pa-Modou Kah confirmed that Lee was returning to the University of British Columbia in the fall, and that the team was interested in having him return to the club for the 2022 season.

In March 2022, he signed for Whitecaps FC 2, ahead of the revived club's inaugural season in MLS Next Pro. In July 2022, he joined the first team on two short-term loans for their matches against Minnesota United FC and FC Cincinnati. After the season, Whitecaps 2 declined his club option for 2023.

In 2023, he joined Nautsa’mawt FC in League1 British Columbia.

== International career ==
In 2016, he attended a camp for the Canada U15 national team.

== Career statistics ==
As of July 15, 2023

Club	Season	League			Playoffs		Domestic Cup		Continental		Total	
Club	Season	Division	Apps	Goals	Apps	Goals	Apps	Goals	Apps	Goals	Apps	Goals
Pacific FC	2021	Canadian Premier League	3	0	0	0	0	0	–		3	0
Whitecaps FC 2	2022	MLS Next Pro	11	0	–		–		–		11	0
Vancouver Whitecaps FC (loan)	2022	Major League Soccer	0	0	–		0	0	–		0	0
Nautsa’mawt FC	2023	League1 British Columbia	11	0	–		–		–		11	0
Career total			25	0	0	0	0	0	0	0	25	0
