= Simone Masi =

Canadian soccer player (born 2002)

Personal information
- Full name: Simone Gabriele Masi
- Date of birth: February 20, 2002 (age 24)
- Place of birth: Vancouver, British Columbia, Canada
- Height: 1.88 m (6 ft 2 in)
- Position: Defender

Youth career
- Italian Canadian Sports Federation
- Cliff Avenue United FC
- Coquitlam Metro-Ford SC
- Mountain United FC
- 2019–2021: Vancouver Whitecaps FC

College career
Years	Team	Apps	(Gls)
2021	Simon Fraser Athletics	16	(1)

Senior career*
Years	Team	Apps	(Gls)
2022–2023	Whitecaps FC 2	26	(1)
2024	Pistoiese	7	(0)
2024	Burnaby FC	2	(0)
- * Club domestic league appearances and goals as of June 16, 2024

Simone Gabriele Masi (born February 20, 2002) is a Canadian professional soccer player.

== Early life ==
Masi played youth soccer with the Italian Canadian Sports Federation, Cliff Avenue United FC, Coquitlam Metro-Ford SC, and Mountain United FC before joining the Vancouver Whitecaps Academy in August 2019. In addition, he also played with the British Columbia provincial team.

== University career ==
In January 2021, he committed to attend Simon Fraser University and play for the men's soccer team, beginning in the fall. On November 13, 2021, he scored his first university goal, in a victory over the Western Washington Vikings. At the end of the season, he was named to the All-Great Northwest Athletic Conference First Team (being the only freshman named to the team), the D2 All-West Region Team, and was also named SFU's Freshman of the Year.

== Club career ==
In March 2022, Masi signed a professional contract with Whitecaps FC 2 in MLS Next Pro. On March 26, 2022, he made his professional debut against Houston Dynamo 2. On April 24, 2022, he scored his first professional goal in a victory over Sporting Kansas City II. His contract expired after the 2023 season, and he began playing at the senior amateur level with Columbus FC Vancouver in the Vancouver Metro Soccer League.

In February 2024, he signed with Italian Serie D club Pistoiese. He made his debut on February 18 in a 0-0 draw against Mezzolara.

In June 2024, he began playing with Burnaby FC in League1 British Columbia.

== Career statistics ==
As of June 16, 2024

Club	Season	League			Playoffs		Domestic Cup		Other		Total	
Club	Season	Division	Apps	Goals	Apps	Goals	Apps	Goals	Apps	Goals	Apps	Goals
Whitecaps FC 2	2023	MLS Next Pro	19	1	–		–		–		19	1
Whitecaps FC 2	2024	MLS Next Pro	7	0	–		–		–		7	0
Whitecaps FC 2	Total		26	1	0	0	0	0	0	0	26	1
Pistoiese	2023–24	Serie D	7	0	–		–		–		7	0
Burnaby FC	2024	League1 British Columbia	2	0	–		–		–		1	0
Career total			35	1	0	0	0	0	0	0	35	1
