= Evan Taylor (footballer) =

Jamaican footballer (born 1989)

Personal information
- Full name: Evan Taylor
- Date of birth: 25 January 1989 (age 37)
- Place of birth: Savanna-la-Mar, Jamaica
- Height: 5 ft 8 in (1.73 m)
- Position: Midfielder

Team information
- Current team: Mount Pleasant F.A

Senior career*
Years	Team	Apps	(Gls)
2008–	Reno	76	(3)
2009	→ Whitecaps Residency (loan)	7	(0)
2011	→ Charleston Battery (loan)	13	(0)
2012 – 2013	→ Harbour View F.C. (loan)	1	(0)
2013 – 2014	→ Montego Bay United F.C. (loan)	7	(0)
2014 – 2018	Waterhouse F.C.	12	(0)
2018 –	Mount Pleasant F.A	3	(0)

International career
2008–2009	Jamaica U20	8	(0)
2010–2011	Jamaica U23	3	(0)
2008–	Jamaica	11	(0)
- * Club domestic league appearances and goals as of 4 June 2011

Evan Taylor (born 25 January 1989) is a Jamaican footballer who currently plays for Mount Pleasant Football Academy.

== Career ==
=== Club ===
Taylor attended and played soccer at Godfrey Stewart High School in Jamaica, and started his club career at Reno of the Jamaica National Premier League where, under the tutelage of former Jamaica national team player and coach, Wendell Downswell, he plays for under-21 and senior teams. In 2009, Taylor went on loan to the Vancouver Whitecaps Residency during the DPL off-season. Following a strong season in Reno's return to Jamaica's top flight in 2010–2011, Taylor was signed by Charleston Battery of the American USL Pro league on 16 March 2011.

Taylor joined Harbour View F.C. for a season long loan in 2012, where he led them to the RSPL title. Taylor spent 2013–2014 on loan once again to Montego Bay United F.C. In August 2014, Taylor moved to Waterhouse F.C.

In August 2018, Evan Taylor joined Mount Pleasant Football Academy in the RSPL.

=== International ===
Evan Taylor was given his senior national team debut by Rene Simoes in 2008 World Cup qualifiers. Taylor also played on Jamaica's 2009 U20 squad.

== Honours ==
=== Reno ===
- Western Confederation Super League:
  - Winner (1): 2010

=== Harbour View ===
- Jamaica National Premier League:
  - Winner (1): 2013
