= Mitch Piraux =

Canadian soccer player (born 1995)

Personal information
- Full name: Mitchell Aaron Piraux
- Date of birth: April 18, 1995 (age 31)
- Place of birth: Calgary, Alberta, Canada
- Height: 1.73 m (5 ft 8 in)
- Position: Midfielder

Team information
- Current team: UBC Thunderbirds
- Number: 23

Youth career
- 2008–2010: Calgary Foothills
- 2011–2015: Whitecaps FC Residency

College career
Years	Team	Apps	(Gls)
2018–	UBC Thunderbirds	8	(0)

Senior career*
Years	Team	Apps	(Gls)
2014	Vancouver Whitecaps FC U-23	8	(0)
2015–2016	Whitecaps FC 2	10	(0)

International career^{‡}
2010	Canada U15	2	(0)
- * Club domestic league appearances and goals as of March 29, 2019 ‡ National team caps and goals as of April 14, 2015

Mitchell Aaron "Mitch" Piraux (born April 18, 1995) is a Canadian soccer player who currently plays for the UBC Thunderbirds.

== Career ==
=== Youth and amateur ===
Piraux began his youth career with the Calgary Foothills before joining the Vancouver Whitecaps FC Residency program in 2011. He spent four seasons with the Residency program.

Piraux also played in the Premier Development League for Vancouver Whitecaps FC U-23. In December 2016, Whitecaps FC 2 announced that Piraux would not return to the club for the 2017 season

.

=== Professional ===
On February 17, 2015, Piraux signed a professional contract with Whitecaps FC 2, a USL affiliate club of Vancouver Whitecaps FC. He made his professional debut on March 29 in a 4–0 defeat to Seattle Sounders FC 2.

=== International ===
Piraux made two appearances for the Canadian under-15 national team in 2010. He has also been called in to the Canadian under-18 camp.
