= Devin O'Hea =

Canadian soccer player (born 2000)

Personal information
- Full name: Devin Gerard O'Hea
- Date of birth: February 5, 2000 (age 26)
- Place of birth: North Vancouver, British Columbia, Canada
- Height: 1.85 m (6 ft 1 in)
- Position: Forward

Team information
- Current team: Northcote City

Youth career
- Lynn Valley Fusion
- Mountain United FC
- 2014–2016: Vancouver Whitecaps FC
- 2016–2018: Mountain United FC

College career
Years	Team	Apps	(Gls)
2019–2023	Simon Fraser Red Leafs	46	(15)

Senior career*
Years	Team	Apps	(Gls)
2022–2024	TSS FC Rovers	17	(6)
2024	Flint City Bucks	2	(1)
2024	Pacific	7	(0)
2025–	Northcote City	21	(9)

International career^{‡}
2016	Canada U17	1	(0)
- * Club domestic league appearances and goals as of October 5, 2024 ‡ National team caps and goals as of April 17, 2016

Devin Gerard O'Hea (born February 5, 2000) is a Canadian soccer player who plays for Australian club Northcote in the Victorian Premier League Division 1.

== Early life ==
O'Hea began playing youth soccer at age four with the Lynn Valley Fusion. He later played with Mountain United FC, before joining the Vancouver Whitecaps Academy in 2014. In 2016, he departed the Whitecaps program to return home to attend Argyle Secondary School, as he wished to play other sports (basketball and Canadian football) in addition to soccer. He then re-joined Mountain United FC for soccer. In 2017, he played with Team British Columbia at the 2017 Canada Summer Games.

== University career ==
In 2018, he began attending Simon Fraser University, being offer athletic scholarships for soccer and football, choosing to play American football for the football team. As a freshman, he played wide receiver, he finished third on the team in receiving yards, catching 36 passes for 484 yards and a touchdown.

In 2019, he switched to represent the men's soccer team. After dealing with a back injury from his time playing football, which limited his playing time over his first two seasons, he scored his first goal on September 1, 2022, in a match against the Sonoma State Seawolves. He led the team in scoring in 2022 and was named a GNAC First Team All-Star. At the end of the 2023 season, he was named the Great Northwest Athletic Conference Player of the Year and a GNAC First Team All-Star. He was also named to the Division II All West-Region First Teams.

== Club career ==
From 2022 to 2024, he played with the TSS FC Rovers in League1 British Columbia, scoring six goals in 19 games across all competitions.

In June 2024, he joined the Flint City Bucks in USL League Two. He scored his first goal for Flint on June 29 against Kalamazoo FC.

In July 2024, he signed a contract with Pacific FC of the Canadian Premier League for the remainder of the 2024 season with an option for 2025. The club declined his option for 2025.

In January 2025, he signed with Australian club Northcote City FC in the third tier Victorian Premier League Division 1.

== International career ==
In February 2016, O'Hea was called up to the Canada U17 for the first time for a training camp, subsequently being called for a second camp in April. He made one appearance in a friendly against the United States U17 on April 17, 2016.

== Career statistics ==
As of October 5, 2024

Appearances and goals by club, season and competition
Club	Season	League			Playoffs		Domestic cup		Total	
Club	Season	Division	Apps	Goals	Apps	Goals	Apps	Goals	Apps	Goals
TSS FC Rovers	2022	League1 British Columbia	9	2	1	0	—		10	2
TSS FC Rovers	2023	League1 British Columbia	1	0	0	0	0	0	1	0
TSS FC Rovers	2024	League1 British Columbia	7	4	0	0	1	0	8	4
TSS FC Rovers	Total		17	6	1	0	1	0	19	6
Flint City Bucks	2024	USL League Two	2	1	0	0	–		2	1
Pacific FC	2024	Canadian Premier League	7	0	0	0	0	0	7	0
Career total			26	7	1	0	1	0	28	7
