= Caleb Clarke (soccer) =

Canadian soccer player (born 1993)

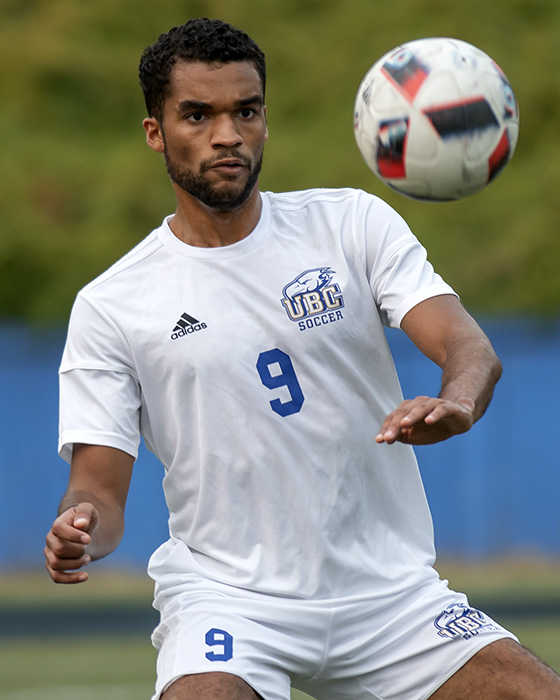

Personal information
- Full name: Caleb Robert Clarke
- Date of birth: June 23, 1993 (age 33)
- Place of birth: Richmond, British Columbia, Canada
- Height: 1.85 m (6 ft 1 in)
- Position: Forward

Team information
- Current team: Altitude FC

Youth career
- 2003–2008: Richmond Selects
- 2008–2009: Coastal WFC
- 2009–2010: Vancouver Whitecaps FC Residency

College career
Years	Team	Apps	(Gls)
2018	UBC Thunderbirds	14	(8)

Senior career*
Years	Team	Apps	(Gls)
2010–2012	Vancouver Whitecaps FC U-23	37	(13)
2012–2015	Vancouver Whitecaps FC	2	(0)
2013–2014	→ FC Augsburg II (loan)	26	(8)
2015	→ Whitecaps FC 2 (loan)	25	(7)
2016	SpVgg Unterhaching	6	(0)
2016–2017	FC Amberg	9	(1)
2016–2017	FC Amberg II	7	(3)
2019	Victoria Highlanders	2	(1)
2022	Varsity FC		
2025–	Altitude FC	7	(1)

International career^{‡}
2012–2013	Canada U20	7	(6)
2015	Canada U23	8	(2)
2013–2015	Canada	2	(0)
- * Club domestic league appearances and goals as of July 5, 2022 ‡ National team caps and goals as of October 13, 2015

Caleb Robert Clarke (born June 23, 1993) is a Canadian soccer player who plays as a forward for Altitude FC in League1 British Columbia.

== Early career ==
Clarke began playing youth soccer with the Richmond Selects. He later played with Coastal WFC, with whom he won a USL Super Y-League North American championship title, before joining the Whitecaps FC Academy in 2009. In 2008 and 2009, he trained with Italian club Udinese.

== Club career ==
=== Vancouver Whitecaps ===
From 2010 to 2012, he played with the Vancouver Whitecaps FC U-23 in the Premier Development League. After impressing with the PDL side, he began appearing with the Vancouver Whitecaps Reserve side in the MLS Reserve League in 2011, while also training with the first team.

In April 2012, he signed a Major League Soccer contract with Vancouver Whitecaps FC as a homegrown player, becoming the first Vancouver-area player to graduate from the academy to the first team. In June 2012, he went on trial with German 3. Liga club FC Rot-Weiß Erfurt, with the possibility of securing a one-year loan. He made his MLS debut on August 15, 2012 as a substitute against FC Dallas. In his first season, he made two substitute appearances with the Whitecaps for a total of 15 minutes of action.

In May 2013, he went on trial with Dutch club Feyenoord. In July 2013, he went on loan with German side FC Augsburg II in the fourth tier Regionalliga Bayern, while also training with the first team. In 26 appearances, he scored 8 goals, before returning to Canada in May to undergo surgery to repair a ruptured quadriceps muscle at the end of May the following year.

In December 2014, he re-signed with the Whitecaps. He spent the majority of the 2015 season playing for the new second team Whitecaps FC 2 in the USL. He scored the first goal in the second team's history on April 1, 2015. After the 2015 season he departed the Whitecaps.

=== Germany ===
On February 1, 2016, he returned to Germany, joining fourth tier side SpVgg Unterhaching.

Later in 2016, he joined another German side FC Amberg in the fifth tier Bayernliga Nord, also playing for their second team. Following Amberg's relegation, he was released by the club.

=== University career ===
In 2018, he began attending the University of British Columbia, playing for the men's soccer team. He scored his first goal in his debut on August 31 against the UFV Cascades. On September 16, he scored a hat trick against the Calgary Dinos, which earned him U Sports Athlete of the Week honours. He was named a Canada West Second Team All-Star.

=== Amateur and semi-pro ===
After returning from Germany, he also played at the amateur level in the Vancouver Metro Soccer League with amateur clubs such as CCB United between 2018 and 2022.

In July 2019, he signed with the Victoria Highlanders FC in USL League Two.

In May 2022, he joined Varsity FC in the new League1 British Columbia.

In 2025, Clarke joined Altitude FC.

== International career ==
In 2011, he received his first call up to the Canada national team program, attending a camp for the Canada U18 team. He was a part of the Canada U20 team for the 2013 CONCACAF U-20 Championship, where he scored two goals in a 5-1 victory over Nicaragua U20 on February 22.

On November 12, 2013 earned his first call-up for the Canada national men's soccer team as a replacement for Iain Hume ahead of friendlies against Czech Republic and Slovenia. Clarke made his senior debut on November 15 against in a 2-0 away defeat to Czech Republic as a second half sub for Dwayne De Rosario.

In July 2015, he was named to the Canada U23 team for the 2015 Pan Am Games. In May 2016, Clarke was called to U23 national team for a pair of friendlies against Guyana and Grenada. He scored in both matches.
