= Abdul Binate =

Ivorian footballer (born 2003)

Personal information
- Full name: Abdul Wahid A Binate
- Date of birth: January 24, 2003 (age 23)
- Place of birth: Abidjan, Ivory Coast
- Height: 1.83 m (6 ft 0 in)
- Position: Forward

Team information
- Current team: Harju JK
- Number: 19

Youth career
- 2014–2015: CS Fabrose
- 2016–2017: CS Chomedey
- 2018–2021: CF Montréal

Senior career*
Years	Team	Apps	(Gls)
2022–2023	Pacific FC	3	(0)
2023	→ Nautsa’mawt FC (loan)	4	(1)
2024	Valour FC	27	(4)
2025	AS Blainville	15	(7)
2026–	Harju JK	29	(6)
- * Club domestic league appearances and goals as of November 17, 2026

Abdul Wahid Binate (born January 24, 2003) is an Ivorian professional footballer who plays for Harju JK in the Estonian Meistriliiga.

== Early life ==
Binate played for the CF Montreal Academy, playing with the U23 team in 2022. In 2021, he won a student-athlete scholarship from the Fondation de l’athlète d’excellence (FAEQ).

== Club career ==
In February 2022, Binate signed a professional contract with Pacific FC of the Canadian Premier League. He suffered an injury in pre-season and missed the entire 2022 season. In November 2022, he re-signed with the club for the 2023 season. He also spent some time on loan with Pacific's League1 British Columbia affiliate Nautsa’mawt FC in 2023. He made his professional debut with Pacific on July 11, in a substitute appearance against the HFX Wanderers. Binate was released by Pacific FC in November 2023, after having made three appearances for the club.

In February 2024, Binate signed with Valour FC. After limited playing time during his time with Pacific, he became a fundamental piece for Valour in 2024, recording over 1000 minutes of action. On June 23, he scored his first professional goal in a match against Forge FC.

Ahead of the 2025 season, he went on trial with Sporting Kansas City II. He then joined AS Blainville in Ligue1 Québec for the 2025 season, where he won the Ballon D'or, as the league's best player.

In February 2026, he signed with Harju JK in the Estonian Meistriliiga.

== Career statistics ==
As of September 23, 2025

Appearances and goals by club, season and competition
Club	Season	League			Playoffs		National cup		Other		Total	
Club	Season	Division	Apps	Goals	Apps	Goals	Apps	Goals	Apps	Goals	Apps	Goals
Pacific FC	2022	Canadian Premier League	0	0	0	0	0	0	0	0	0	0
Pacific FC	2023	Canadian Premier League	3	0	0	0	0	0	–		3	0
Pacific FC	Total		3	0	0	0	0	0	0	0	3	0
Nautsa’mawt FC (loan)	2023	League1 British Columbia	4	1	–		–		–		4	1
Valour FC	2024	Canadian Premier League	27	4	–		1	0	–		28	4
AS Blainville	2025	Ligue1 Québec	15	7	–		–		2	3	17	10
Career total			59	12	0	0	1	0	2	3	52	15
