= Daniel Kaiser (soccer, born 2000) =

Canadian soccer player (born 2000)

Personal information
- Full name: Daniel Matthias Kaiser
- Date of birth: May 3, 2000 (age 26)
- Place of birth: Calgary, Alberta, Canada
- Height: 1.85 m (6 ft 1 in)
- Position: Defender

Team information
- Current team: Burnaby FC
- Number: 2

Youth career
- Calgary NSD
- 2011-2016: Calgary Foothills
- 2016–2018: Vancouver Whitecaps FC

College career
Years	Team	Apps	(Gls)
2018–2022	UBC Thunderbirds	60	(4)

Senior career*
Years	Team	Apps	(Gls)
2019	Calgary Foothills	6	(0)
2021	Cavalry FC	11	(0)
2022–2023	Nautsa’mawt FC (Note: Varsity FC changed its name to Nautsa’mawt FC in 2023)	18	(4)
2024–	Burnaby FC	6	(0)
- * Club domestic league appearances and goals as of August 8, 2024

Daniel Matthias Kaiser (born May 3, 2000) is a Canadian professional soccer player who plays for Burnaby FC in League1 British Columbia.

== Early life ==
Kaiser began playing youth soccer at age four with Calgary NSD SC. Afterwards, he played with Calgary Foothills FC, before joining the Vancouver Whitecaps Academy in August 2016.

== University career ==
In 2018, Kaiser began attending the University of British Columbia where he played for the men's soccer team. After his rookie season, he was named to the Canada West All-Rookie Team. In 2022, he won a silver medal in the U Sports national championship, scoring in the final, as UBC were defeated in a penalty shootout by the TRU Wolfpack.

== Club career ==
In the summer of 2019, he played in USL League Two with his former youth club Calgary Foothills, making six appearances.

In June 2021, he signed a U Sports Development contract with Cavalry FC. He made his debut on June 27, 2021, in a 2–1 win over York United.

In 2022, he joined League1 British Columbia side Varsity FC (later renamed Nautsa’mawt FC in 2023).

== International career ==
In April 2015, he participated in an identification camp with the Canada U15 team.

== Personal ==
He is the older brother of fellow soccer player Markus Kaiser.
