= Doveton SC =

- Full name: Doveton Soccer Club
- Short name: DSC
- Founded: 1967 January 22; 59 years ago
- Ground: Waratah Reserve
- League: Victorian State League 1 South–East
- 2025: 6th of 12
- Website: https://dovetonsoccerclub.teamapp.com/
Home colours	Away colours

Doveton Soccer Club is an Australian semi-professional soccer club based in the south-eastern Melbourne suburb of Eumemmerring. Founded in 1967 by European Australians but mostly from England, the club competes in the Victorian State League, operating under license from Football Victoria. Presently competing in the fourth highest level of Victorian state soccer, the club has competed in all of the first seven league tiers, and have been mitre premiers in all except for the first and sixth tiers.

== Honours ==
=== State ===
- Victorian State Second Tier

Premiers (2): 1980, 1990

- Victorian State Third Tier

Premiers (1): 1977
Runner's Up (2): 1988, 2019 (South-East)

- Victorian State Fourth Tier

Premiers (1): 2018 (South-East)

- Victorian State Fourth Tier Reserves

Premiers (2): 2014 (South-East), 2018 (South-East)

- Victorian State Fifth Tier

Premiers (1): 2012 (South-East)
Runner's Up (1): 1975

- Victorian State Six Tier

Premiers (3): 2001 (South-East), 2006 (South-East), 2010 (South-East)
Runner's Up (1): 1973

- Victorian State Seventh Tier

Premiers (1): 1970 (East)
Runner's Up (1): 1999 (South-East)

== Competition timeline ==
Season	League										Notes	Top scorer	
Season	Tier	Comp	Pos	P	W	D	L	GF	GA	Pts	Notes	Player(s)	Goals
2024	3	VPL 2	11	22	6	3	13	22	43	21	Relegated, Coach Nicholas Kalmar	Jason Quinlan	10
2023	3	NPL 3	7	22	8	3	11	27	42	27	Coach Gerard McDonagh	Josh Frame	7
2022	3	NPL 3	7	22	7	8	7	32	30	29	Coach Anthony Saunders	Samuel Catherine	11
2021	3	NPL 3	8	14	6	0	8	33	31	18	Coach Anthony Saunders	Samuel Catherine	8
2020	3	NPL 3	NA	0	0	0	0	0	0	0	No Season		
2019	3	SL1 SE	2	22	16	1	5	61	29	49	Promoted, Coach Anthony Saunders	Josh Frame, League Leading Goalscorer	17
2018	4	SL2 SE	1	22	16	4	2	66	19	52	Champions Promoted, Coach Anthony Saunders	Josh Frame, League Leading Goalscorer	21
2017	4	SL2 SE	3	22	15	2	5	48	29	47	Coach Anthony Saunders	Senahid Tokalic	6
2016	4	SL2 SE	6	22	11	1	10	41	35	34	Coach Daniel McMinimee	Aziz Bayeh	9
2015	4	SL2 SE	9	22	6	7	9	37	43	25	Coach Daniel McMinimee	Farai Murwira	12
2014	4	SL2 SE	7	22	10	3	9	40	32	33	Coach Vasilios Natsioulas	Ioasa Saemo	10
2013	3	SL2 SE	12	22	4	3	15	34	56	15	Coach Tony Saunders Rds 1-12, Julian Costin Rds 13-22	Simon Mur	13
2012	4	SL3 SE	1	22	18	3	1	55	20	54	Champions Promoted, Farai Murwira League Best & Fairest winner, Coach Tony Saunders	Farai Murwira & Simon Mur, Joint League Leading Goalscorers	16
2011	4	SL3 SE	5	22	10	2	10	42	32	32	Coach Tony Saunders	Jonathan Ash	12
2010	5	PL Div1 SE	1	22	13	4	5	46	26	43	Champions Promoted, Coach Tony Saunders	Leon Buhic	11
2009	5	PL Div1 SE	10	22	4	8	10	24	39	19	Coach Jim Morrison Rds1-13, Daniel McMinimee Rds 14-22	Leon Buhic	6
2008	4	SL3 SE	11	22	7	5	10	36	53	26	Relegated, Coach Sam Elmazovski Rds 1-5, Glen Bristow Rd 6, Daniel McMinimee Rd7, Michael Kupinic Rds 8-22	Leon Buhic	12
2007	4	SL3 SE	3	22	13	1	8	42	33	40	Coach Sam Elmazovski	Leon Buhic	20
2006	5	PL Div1 SE	1	22	16	3	3	54	31	51	champions, Promoted, Coach Sam Elmazovski	Glen Bristow, League Leading Goalscorer	18
2005	4	SL3 SE	12	22	4	4	14	28	47	16	Relegated, Coach Perri Tsiaplias Rds 1-12, Billy Whiteside Rds 13-22	Glen Bristow	10
2004	4	SL3 SE	6	22	8	5	9	23	33	29	Coach Jimmy Williams	Michael Fox, Colin Hanna	5
2003	4	SL3 SE	7	22	7	9	6	26	27	30	Coach Jimmy Williams	Tom Perry	8
2002	4	SL3 SE	10	22	6	6	10	36	46	24	Coach Daniel McMinimee	Anthony Saunders	12
2001	5	PL Div1 SE	1	22	16	3	3	48	16	51	Champions Promoted, Coach Daniel McMinimee, Tommy Rice, League Best & Fairest winner	Anthony Saunders	13
2000	5	PL Div1	6	22	9	7	6	33	27	34	Coach Daniel McMinimee	Darren Lee	9
1999	7	PL Div2 SE	2	22	15	3	4	54	20	48	Promoted, Coach Daniel McMinimee, Mario Sonn League Best & Fairest winner	Darren Lee	10
1998	7	PL Div2 SE	3	22	14	3	5	53	36	45	Coach Daniel McMinimee, Robert Nelson League Best & Fairest winner	Darren Lee	17
1997	6	PL Div1	14	26	2	1	23	19	107	4	Relegated, Coach Herbie Mayne	Cedric Meyer	3
1996	6	PL Div1	9	26	8	8	10	27	33	32	Coach Jimmy Williams	John Cummings	7
1995	5	SL Div4	13	26	3	9	14	29	58	18	Relegated, Coach Robert Nelson	Tom O'Halloran	11
1994	4	SL Div3	14	26	5	5	16	27	67	15	Relegated, Coach Tom O;Halloran	Wayne Samuels	11
1993	3	SL Div2	14	26	1	4	21	13	63	6	Relegated, Coach Norm Maitland	Mark Dyker, Wayne Fisher, Jerry Florindo, Diago Simios	2
1992	2	SL Div1	14	26	2	3	21	12	75	7	Relegated, Coach Danny McMinimee	Daniel McMinimee	3
1991	1	Prem Lge	14	26	1	6	19	11	58	8	Relegated, Coach Jim Stewart Rds 1-14, Jim Train Rds 15-26	Mitch Catttermole	4
1990	2	Metro Div 1	1	26	16	7	3	41	21	39	Champions Promoted, Coach Billy Whiteside	Danny Neild, League Leading Goalscorer	17
1989	2	Metro Div 1	9	26	10	5	11	30	41	25	Coach Jim Milne, Ernie Merrick	Danny Nield	15
1988	3	Metro Div 2	2	26	16	7	3	45	22	39	Promoted, Coach Duncan Smith	Arthur Cherrie	7
1987	3	Metro Div 2	12	26	4	7	15	25	39	15	Coach Duncan Smith	Colin Hawthorne	7
1986	2	Metro Div 2	14	26	2	6	18	18	68	10	Relegated, Coach Billy Millen Rd 1, Ian Sweeney Rds 2-26	Brad Johnson	11
1985	2	Metro Div 2	10	26	8	8	10	32	36	24	Coach Ian Williamson	Arthur Cherrie	5
1984	1	State Lge	14	26	4	6	16	29	46	14	Relegated, Coach Hammy McMeecham Rds 1-11, Ian Williamson Rds12-26	Jim Nelson	6
1983	1	State Lge	11	26	7	3	16	30	46	17	Coach Ernie Merrick Rds 1-13, Hammy McMeecham Rds 14-26	Stan Webster, Ian Stirton, John Dowie	6
1982	1	State Lge	10	26	7	5	14	34	42	19	Coach Ernie Merrick	Stan Webster	11
1981	1	State Lge	3	22	7	12	3	29	26	26	Coach Danny McMinimee	Arthur Cherrie	8
1980	2	Metro Div 1	1	22	12	8	2	35	15	32	Champions Promoted, Coach Danny McMinimee	Alan Quinn, League Leading Goalscorer	7+
1979	2	Metro Div 1	5	22	7	8	7	28	25	22	Coach Danny McMinimee	Steve Irvine	4+
1978	2	Metro Div 1	5	22	10	3	9	34	33	23	Coach Danny MvMinimee	Brian Roderick	8
1977	3	Metro Div 2	1	22	16	4	2	58	13	36	Champions Promoted, Coach Brian Edgley Rds 1-6, Danny McMinimee Rds 7-22	Sam Murray	13
1976	3	Metro Div 2	6	22	8	6	8	29	31	22	Coach Russell Murray	Stephen Gaw	6
1975	4	Metro Div 3	2	22	13	4	5	46	21	30	Promoted, Coach Danny McMinimee	Ian Sweeney	13
1974	4	Metro Div 3	7	22	9	4	9	34	31	22	Coach Archie Currie		
1973	5	Metro Div 4	2	22	14	4	4	53	22	32	Promoted, Coach Archie Currie		
1972	6	Prov Lge	7	20	7	6	7	32	40	20	Promoted, Doveton was elected to Metro Div 4 after Brunswick Athena was expelled from Metro Div 3, Coach Dave Myatt		
1971	6	Dist PL	10	22	5	4	13	36	58	14	Coach John Brennan		
1970	7	Dist East	1	22	18	3	1	82	18	39	Champions Promoted, Coach John Brennan Rds 1-17, Dave Wilkinson Rds 18-22	Dave Wilkinson	13
1969	D	Not entered											
1968	6	Dist Cent	??	18	5	2	4	??	??	??	From Ladder 8 August, final table unavailable		
1968	6	Dist East	??	18	2	0	10	??	??	??	From Ladder 8 August, final table unavailable		

=== Other ===
- Mens Masters

Runner's Up (1): 2012 (South-East)

- Metropolitan League 4

Runner's Up (1): 2013 (South-East)
