= Nautsaʼmawt FC =

Semi-professional soccer club

- Full name: Nautsaʼmawt Football Club
- Founded: 2021
- Stadium: Thunderbird Stadium, Rashpal Dhillon Track & Field Oval
- Owner: Hope and Health For Life Society
- Head Coach: Mike Mosher (men); Jesse Symons (women)
- League: League1 British Columbia
- 2023: L1BC, 5th; Playoffs, DNQ (men); L1BC, 2nd; Playoffs, SF (women)
- Website: https://nautsamawtfc.com/

Nautsaʼmawt Football Club (formerly known as Varsity FC) was a Canadian semi-professional soccer club based in Vancouver, British Columbia that played in League1 British Columbia.

== History ==
=== Varsity FC ===
Varsity FC logo

Varsity FC was officially unveiled on December 3, 2021, as an inaugural licence holder for the first season of the new semi-professional League1 British Columbia in 2022. The team was formed in partnership with the University of British Columbia and their Thunderbirds sports teams with the head coaches of both the UBC men's and women's soccer teams serving as the club's inaugural head coaches. In addition, Varsity's home stadium will be UBC's Thunderbird Stadium with select games being played on the field at the Rashpal Dhillon Track & Field Oval, also located on the UBC campus.

Their inaugural matches, for the male and female teams, occurred on May 26 against Unity FC, with both sides winning their matches 2–0. Their home debut occurred on June 4, with the men defeating the Victoria Highlanders 3–0, while the women defeated the Highlanders 3–2. They won the 2022 Juan de Fuca Plate as the League1 BC club with the greatest number of combined points between the men's and women's divisions during the regular season. Varsity finished atop the regular season standings for both the men's and women's divisions in the debut season, advancing to the championship finals. In the women's final, Varsity was defeated by Vancouver Whitecaps Girls Elite, while the men were defeated by TSS Rovers FC in a penalty shootout. Despite losing in the finals, the women's team represented L1BC at the League1 Canada Interprovincial Championship, as the Whitecaps were unable to attend, where they finished in 4th place, following defeats to PLSQ side AS Blainville in the semi-finals and losing in a penalty shootout to League1 Ontario side Alliance United FC in the third-place match.

=== Nautsaʼmawt FC ===
In January 2023, the club went under a change of ownership with UBC Athletics transferring ownership to Hope and Health For Life Society, a non-profit which aims to increase access to sport for development and social impact opportunities with a focus on Indigenous children and youth. As part of the ownership transfer, the club would also rebrand the club name. In February 2023, the club officially re-branded as Nautsaʼmawt FC. The name was inspired by the Hul'qumi'num term, Nautsaʼmawt, which means "One Heart, One Mind". In April 2023, the club signed a sponsorship agreement with EA Sports FC (formally known as the EA Sports FIFA video game series). In 2023, they formed an affiliation with Canadian Premier League club Pacific FC, which enables Pacific to send players to Nautsaʼmawt on short-term loans throughout the season.

After the 2023 season, the club opted to not renew its license for the 2024 League1 BC season, with the club's men's team not providing playing time to Indigenous men's players (although this goal was achieved on the women's side) and with the club struggling to attract much fan support to the matches, although it still intends to run the club in order to offer support, mentorship, and experiences to local athletes facing systemic barriers and will continue to partner with the UBC Thunderbirds Women’s soccer team, along with other amateur and professional teams.

== Seasons ==
=== Men ===
as Varsity FC

Season	League	Teams	Record	Rank	Playoffs	Juan de Fuca Plate	Ref
2022	League1 British Columbia	7	9–1–2	1st	Runner-up	Winner (Note: The Juan de Fuca Plate is a combined men's and women's competition that combines both squads results)	

as Nautsaʼmawt FC

Season	League	Teams	Record	Rank	Playoffs	Juan de Fuca Plate	Ref
2023	League1 British Columbia	8	4–5–5	5th	did not qualify	3rd	

=== Women ===
as Varsity FC

Season	League	Teams	Record	Rank	Playoffs	Inter-provincial Championship	Juan de Fuca Plate	Ref
2022	League1 British Columbia	7	11–0–1	1st	Runner-up	4th	Winner (Note: The Juan de Fuca Plate is a combined men's and women's competition that combines both squads results)	

as Nautsaʼmawt FC

Season	League	Teams	Record	Rank	Playoffs	Inter-provincial Championship	Juan de Fuca Plate	Ref
2023	League1 British Columbia	8	9–2–3	2nd	Semi-finals	did not qualify	3rd	

== Notable players ==
The following players have either played at the professional or international level, either before or after playing for the League1 BC team:

=== Men ===
- (Canada) Paul Amedume
- (Canada) Abdul Binate
- (Canada) Thomas Gardner
- (Canada) Daniel Kaiser
- (Canada) Caleb Clarke
- (Canada) Eric Lajeunesse
- (Canada) Christopher Lee
- (Canada) Joe Zupo

=== Women ===
- (Canada) Mia Pante
- (Canada) Emma Regan
- (Canada) Danielle Steer
- (Canada) Holly Ward
