= 2025 Vancouver Rise FC season =

Canadian soccer club's season of play

Vancouver Rise FC
2025 season
- Owner: Greg Kerfoot (majority); Christine Sinclair
- President: Sinead King
- Head coach: Anja Heiner-Møller
- Stadium: Swangard Stadium; Burnaby, British Columbia
- Northern Super League: 3rd
- Playoffs: Champions
- Top goalscorer: League: Jessica De Filippo (7); All: Holly Ward (8)
- Highest home attendance: 14,018 vs. Calgary Wild (April 16)
- Lowest home attendance: 1,900 vs. Halifax Tides (May 21)
- Average home league attendance: 4,245
- Biggest win: Halifax Tides 0–6 Vancouver Rise (July 19); Vancouver Rise 6–0 Calgary Wild (September 6)
- Biggest defeat: AFC Toronto 7–0 Vancouver Rise (September 13)
Home colours	Away colours

The 2025 Vancouver Rise FC season was the first in the club's history, as well as first season in Northern Super League history.

== Team ==
=== Coaching staff ===
As of January 10, 2025.

Position	Name
Head coach	Anja Heiner-Møller
Assistant coach	Katie Collar
Goalkeeper coach	Erin McNulty

=== Roster ===
As of September 11, 2025.

No.	Nat.	Name	Date of birth (age)	Since	Previous club	Notes
Goalkeepers
1	(Canada)	Kirstin Tynan	March 11, 2002 (aged 23)	2025	(Canada) TSS Rovers	
13	(Canada)	Morgan McAslan	February 22, 2000 (aged 25)	2025	(Canada) Whitecaps FC Girls Elite	
31	(Japan)	Jessica Wulf	May 20, 2005 (aged 19)	2025	(Japan) Nippon TV Tokyo Verdy Beleza	
Defenders
2	(Canada)	Shannon Woeller	January 31, 1990 (aged 35)	2025	(Sweden) Vittsjö GIK	
3	(United States)	Jasmyne Spencer	August 27, 1990 (aged 34)	2025	(United States) Angel City	INT
4	(Canada)	Kayla Gonçalves	April 14, 2000 (aged 24)	2025	(Portugal) Famalicão	
12	(Canada)	Jaylyn Wright	August 1, 2003 (aged 21)	2025	(United States) Fresno State Bulldogs	
15	(Canada)	Ariel Young	August 30, 2001 (aged 23)	2025	(Denmark) Fortuna Hjørring	
16	(Canada)	Kennedy Faulknor	June 30, 1999 (aged 25)	2025	(United States) Minnesota Aurora	
18	(Japan)	Yuka Okamoto	September 20, 1997 (aged 27)	2025	(Japan) AC Nagano Parceiro	INT
21	(Philippines)	Jessika Cowart	October 30, 1999 (aged 25)	2025	(Australia) Perth Glory	INT
23	(New Zealand)	Rebecca Lake	May 13, 1999 (aged 25)	2025	(New Zealand) Wellington Phoenix	INT
34	(Canada)	Bridget Mutipula	August 5, 2008 (aged 16)	2025	(Canada) Vancouver Rise Academy	YTH
38	(Canada)	Chloe Taylor	September 2, 2008 (aged 16)	2025	(Canada) Vancouver Rise Academy	YTH
Midfielders
5	(Canada)	Quinn	August 11, 1995 (aged 29)	2025	(United States) Seattle Reign	DP
6	(Sweden)	Sofia Hagman	March 21, 1997 (aged 27)	2025	(Sweden) Vittsjö GIK	INT
7	(United States)	Nikki Stanton	October 26, 1990 (aged 34)	2025	(United States) Seattle Reign	INT
8	(Canada)	Samantha Chang	July 13, 2000 (aged 24)	2025	(Denmark) HB Køge	
10	(Canada)	Lisa Pechersky	June 29, 1998 (aged 26)	2025	(Sweden) Vittsjö GIK	
14	(Canada)	Anna Bout	April 23, 2001 (aged 23)	2025	(Denmark) Odense Boldklub Q	
17	(Sweden)	Sara Lilja Vidlund	September 12, 2001 (aged 23)	2025	(Sweden) Djurgårdens IF	INT
24	(Wales)	Josie Longhurst	February 24, 2002 (aged 23)	2025	(Canada) Whitecaps FC Girls Elite	INT
26	(Algeria)	Anaïs Oularbi	March 24, 2003 (aged 21)	2025	(Canada) CS Mont-Royal Outremont	
33	(Canada)	Sienna Gibson	September 18, 2006 (aged 18)	2025	(Canada) Altitude FC	YTH, Loan
36	(Canada)	Emily Wong	July 9, 2007 (aged 17)	2025	(Canada) Vancouver Rise Academy	YTH
Forwards
9	(United States)	Mariah Lee	June 30, 1996 (aged 28)	2025	(United States) DC Power	INT
11	(Canada)	Jessica De Filippo	April 20, 2001 (aged 23)	2025	(Canada) Whitecaps FC Girls Elite	
19	(Canada)	Holly Ward	October 25, 2003 (aged 21)	2025	(Canada) Burnaby FC	
25	(Egypt)	Nedya Sawan	April 22, 2002 (aged 22)	2025	(United States) Westside Timbers	INT
28	(Canada)	Jaime Perrault	August 8, 2006 (aged 18)	2025	(Denmark) FC Nordsjælland	
49	(Jamaica) (Canada)	Jade Mitchell	January 29, 2007 (aged 18)	2025	(Canada) Vancouver Rise Academy	YTH
99	(Canada)	Latifah Abdu	October 18, 2001 (aged 23)	2025	(Canada) Montreal Roses	

== Competitions ==
=== Overview ===
Competition	Starting round	Final position	Record							
Competition	Starting round	Final position	Pld	W	D	L	GF	GA	GD	Win %
Norther Super League	Matchday 1	3rd	25	11	6	8	38	36	+2	44.00
NSL Playoffs	Semi-finals	Champions	3	2	0	1	5	4	+1	66.67
Total			28	13	6	9	43	40	+3	46.43

Last updated: November 15, 2025
Source: Competitions

=== Northern Super League ===
==== Regular season ====
===== Table =====
Pos	Team	Pld	W	D	L	GF	GA	GD	Pts	Qualification
1	AFC Toronto (S)	25	16	3	6	42	24	+18	51	Advance to playoffs
2	Ottawa Rapid	25	11	6	8	41	26	+15	39 (Note: Head-to-head points tied 7–7; head-to-head goal difference: Ottawa Rapid +3, Vancouver Rise –3)	Advance to playoffs
3	Vancouver Rise (C)	25	11	6	8	38	36	+2	39	Advance to playoffs
4	Montreal Roses	25	10	6	9	30	23	+7	36	Advance to playoffs
5	Calgary Wild	25	9	2	14	26	42	−16	29	
6	Halifax Tides	25	3	7	15	17	43	−26	16	

Source: NSL
Rules for classification: 1) Points 2) Head-to-head points; 3) Head-to-head goal difference; 4) Goal difference; 5) Wins; 6) Goals scored; 7) Goals conceded; 8) Least red cards; 9) Least yellow cards; 10) Drawing of lots.
(C) Champion; (S) Supporters' Shield winner

===== Results summary =====
Overall								Home						Away					
Pld	W	D	L	GF	GA	GD	Pts	W	D	L	GF	GA	GD	W	D	L	GF	GA	GD
28	13	6	9	43	40	+3	45	7	3	3	23	17	+6	6	3	6	20	23	−3

Last updated: November 15, 2025.
Source: NSL

===== Results by match =====
Match	1	2	3	4	5	6	7	8	9	10	11	12	13	14	15	16	17	18	19	20	21	22	23	24	25
Ground	H	H	H	A	A	H	H	A	H	H	A	A	H	H	A	A	A	H	H	A	H	A	A	A	A
Result	W	L	W	D	L	W	D	L	L	D	L	W	W	D	D	W	W	W	W	L	L	D	W	W	L
Position (Note: Positions show the situation at the end of the week the match was played, or at the end of the gameday if more matches are played later in the week.)	2	4	2	2	5	2	2	4	5	4	5	4	4	4	4	4	3	2	2	3	4	4	4	2	3

Updated to match(es) played on October 16, 2025. Source: #Matches
H = Home; N = Neutral; A = Away; W = Win; D = Draw; L = Loss; = Playoffs

===== Matches =====
April 16 1	Vancouver Rise	1–0	Calgary Wild	Vancouver, British Columbia
19:00 PT	Quinn 22' (pen.); Spencer (yellow card) 23'; Sawan (yellow card) 87'	Report	Moore (yellow card) 14'; Dougherty Howard (yellow card) 39'	Stadium: BC Place; Attendance: 14,018; Referee: Marie-Soleil Beaudoin; Assistant referees: Marie-Han Gagnon; Stéphanie Fortin

April 27 2	Vancouver Rise	1–3	Montreal Roses	Burnaby, British Columbia
12:00 PT	Spencer (yellow card) 16'; Quinn 55' (pen.)	Report	Whitaker 3'; Hess 14'; Bilbault (yellow card) 23'; Abdu 41'	Stadium: Swangard Stadium; Attendance: 2,544; Referee: Isabelle Duclos; Assistant referees: Camille Raymond; Megan Opatril

May 5 3	Vancouver Rise	1–0	Halifax Tides	Burnaby, British Columbia
19:00 PT	Spencer 52'; Woeller (yellow card) 70'	Report	Olai (yellow card) 37'; Frémaux (yellow card) 43'; Weichers (yellow card) 63'	Stadium: Swangard Stadium; Attendance: 2,061; Referee: Sheila Couture; Assistant referees: Gabrielle Lemieux; Megan Opatril

May 11 4	AFC Toronto	1–1	Vancouver Rise	Toronto, Ontario
11:00 PT	Kizaki 84'; Small (yellow card) 86'; Barnett (yellow card) 90+1'	Report	De Filippo 90+4'	Stadium: York Lions Stadium; Attendance: 2,615; Referee: Isabelle Duclos; Assistant referees: Melissa Snedden; Natalie Berry

May 15 5	Ottawa Rapid	3–0	Vancouver Rise	Ottawa, Ontario
16:00 PT	Pridham 11', 51'; Bentai 75'	Report		Stadium: TD Place Stadium; Attendance: 2,143; Referee: Carly Shaw-MacLaren; Assistant referees: Allycia Carlucci; Laura Hall

May 21 6	Vancouver Rise	2–1	Halifax Tides	Burnaby, British Columbia
19:00 PT	Pechersky 39'; Lee 44'	Report	Miller 15'; Olai (yellow card) 76'; Blouin (yellow card) 77'	Stadium: Swangard Stadium; Attendance: 1,900; Referee: Salma Flores-Desrochers; Assistant referees: Allycia Carlucci; Shukwia Tajik

May 24 7	Vancouver Rise	1–1	Calgary Wild	Burnaby, British Columbia
16:00 PT	Lee 11'; De Filippo (yellow card) 49'; Pechersky (yellow card) 90+4'	Report	Johnson 16', (yellow card) 86'	Stadium: Swangard Stadium; Attendance: 3,045; Referee: Anne-Marie Canuel; Assistant referees: Marie-Han Gagnon; Megan Opatril

June 7 8	Montreal Roses	2–0	Vancouver Rise	Laval, Quebec
11:00 PT	Hill 9'; Bilbault 24'	Report	Quinn (yellow card) 14'	Stadium: CS Bois-de-Boulogne; Attendance: 3,855; Referee: Isabelle Duclos; Assistant referees: Gabrielle Lemieux; Megan Opatril

June 11 9	Vancouver Rise	2–3	AFC Toronto	Burnaby, British Columbia
19:00 PT	Sawan (yellow card) 27'; Lee 68'; Longhurst (yellow card) 79'; Quinn 90+8' (pen.)	Report	Regan 2', (yellow card) 78'; Hunter 42'; Cathro (yellow card) 51'; Small 73'; Rollins (yellow card) 90+7'	Stadium: Swangard Stadium; Attendance: 3,343; Referee: Salma Flores-Desrochers; Assistant referees: Stéphanie Fortin; Shukwia Tajik

June 22 10	Vancouver Rise	0–0	Montreal Roses	Burnaby, British Columbia
13:00 PT		Report	Hill (yellow card) 30'; Hess (yellow card) 69'; Smith (yellow card) 74'	Stadium: Swangard Stadium; Attendance: 3,858; Referee: Marie-Soleil Beaudoin; Assistant referees: Allycia Carlucci; Victoria Lafortune

July 12 11	Calgary Wild	2–1	Vancouver Rise	Calgary, Alberta
16:00 PT	Thurton 12'; Dougherty Howard (yellow card) 38', (goal) 41'; O'Neill (yellow card) 81'	Report	De Filippo 82'; Stanton (yellow card) 90+3'	Stadium: McMahon Stadium; Attendance: 3,061; Referee: Angelina Baldino; Assistant referees: Melissa Snedden; Allycia Carlucci

July 19 12	Halifax Tides	0–6	Vancouver Rise	Halifax, Nova Scotia
15:00 PT	Weichers (yellow card) 67'	Report	Ward 1', 45'; Spencer 8'; Quinn 31'; Stanton 74'; Lee 77'; Chang (yellow card) 90'	Stadium: Wanderers Grounds; Attendance: 4,255; Referee: Sheila Couture; Assistant referees: Melissa Snedden; Laura Hall

July 24 13	Vancouver Rise	2–1	AFC Toronto	Burnaby, British Columbia
19:00 PT	Chang 19', 35'; Faulknor (yellow card) 21'; De Filippo (yellow card) 42'; Hagman (yellow card) 90+3'	Report	Hunter 9'	Stadium: Swangard Stadium; Attendance: 3,911; Referee: Marie-Soleil Beaudoin; Assistant referees: Stéphanie Fortin; Shukwia Tajik

August 2 14	Vancouver Rise	3–3	Ottawa Rapid	Burnaby, British Columbia
16:00 PT	Quinn 15'; Pechersky 38'; Ward 58'; Stanton (yellow card) 66'	Report	Pridham 13', 90+6'; Choo 21'; Haaland (yellow card) 80'	Stadium: Swangard Stadium; Attendance: 3,988; Referee: Carly Shaw-MacLaren; Assistant referees: Allycia Carlucci; Megan Opatril

August 9 15	Halifax Tides	0–0	Vancouver Rise	Halifax, Nova Scotia
11:00 PT		Report		Stadium: Wanderers Grounds; Attendance: 4,142; Referee: Angelina Baldino; Assistant referees: Melissa Snedden; Natalie Berry

August 17 16	AFC Toronto	0–1	Vancouver Rise	Toronto, Ontario
16:00 PT		Report	Spencer (yellow card) 29' (yellow-red card) 39'; De Filippo 46'; McAslan (yellow card) 90+4'	Stadium: BMO Field; Attendance: 7,771; Referee: Anne-Marie Canuel; Assistant referees: Melissa Snedden; Amanda Kwan

August 24 17	Ottawa Rapid	2–3	Vancouver Rise	Ottawa, Ontario
11:00 PT	Pridham 56'; Benati 88'	Report	Chang 24', 89'; Okamoto (yellow card) 43'; Ward 75'	Stadium: TD Place Stadium; Attendance: 2,651; Referee: Salma Flores-Desrochers; Assistant referees: Stéphanie Fortin; Victoria Lafortune

August 30 18	Vancouver Rise	2–1	Montreal Roses	Burnaby, British Columbia
19:00 PT	Ward 23'; De Filippo (yellow card) 42'; Pechersky 45+1'; Longhurst (yellow card) 90+2'	Report	Boychuk 16'; Roy (yellow card) 35'	Stadium: Swangard Stadium; Attendance: 4,013; Referee: Anne-Marie Canuel; Assistant referees: Melissa Snedden; Shukwia Tajik

September 6 19	Vancouver Rise	6–0	Calgary Wild	Burnaby, British Columbia
16:00 PT	Abdu 14', 52'; Chang (yellow card) 30'; De Filippo 45+4'; Quinn 64' (pen.); Lee 71'; Pechersky 77'	Report	O'Neill (yellow card) 42'; Gray (yellow card) 84'	Stadium: Swangard Stadium; Attendance: 3,897; Referee: Carly Shaw-MacLaren; Assistant referees: Camille Raymond; Heather Lloyd

September 12 20	AFC Toronto	7–0	Vancouver Rise	Toronto, Ontario
11:00 PT	De Filippo (yellow card) 9' (yellow-red card) 45+6'; Wright (yellow card) 16'; Cowart (yellow card) 38'; Abdu (yellow card) 39'; Lake (yellow card) 88'	Report	Okoronkwo 5', 64'; Small (yellow card) 26'; Hunter 45', 68'; Hansen 45+5'; Stratigakis 49'; Kovacevic 85'	Stadium: York Lions Stadium; Attendance: 2,917; Referee: Angelina Baldino; Assistant referees: Camille Raymond; Amanda Kwan

September 20 21	Vancouver Rise	0–3	Ottawa Rapid	Burnaby, British Columbia
13:00 PT	Stanton (yellow card) 62'	Report	Belzile (yellow card) 22'; Gibson (yellow card) 36'; Downing 37', (yellow card) 48'; Pridham 76'; Wilkinson 83'	Stadium: Swangard Stadium; Attendance: 4,358; Referee: Marie-Soleil Beaudoin; Assistant referees: Melissa Snedden; Megan Opatril

September 27 22	Halifax Tides	1–1	Vancouver Rise	Halifax, Nova Scotia
11:00 PT	Clegg 14'; Weichers (yellow card) 20'	Report	Ward 62'	Stadium: Wanderers Grounds; Attendance: 3,359; Referee: Carly Shaw-MacLaren; Assistant referees: Gabrielle Lemieux; Melissa Snedden

October 8 23	Ottawa Rapid	0–2	Vancouver Rise	Ottawa, Ontario
16:30 PT	Golen (yellow card) 76'; Haaland (yellow card) 83'; Pridham (yellow card) 86'; Harris (yellow card) 90+4'	Report	Abdu 14'; De Filippo 17'; Lee (yellow card) 87'	Stadium: TD Place Stadium; Attendance: 2,906; Referee: Carly Shaw-MacLaren; Assistant referees: Allycia Carlucci; Gabrielle Lemieux

October 11 24	Montreal Roses	0–1	Vancouver Rise	Laval, Quebec
09:00 PT	Whitaker (yellow card) 11'; Monyard (yellow card) 64'	Report	De Filippo 10'	Stadium: CS Bois-de-Boulogne; Attendance: 3,388; Referee: Marie-Soleil Beaudoin; Assistant referees: Laura Hall; Camille Raymond

October 16 25	Calgary Wild	2–1	Vancouver Rise	Calgary, Alberta
18:00 PT	Dougherty Howard 38' (pen.); Johnson 45'; Roelfsema (yellow card) 52'; Moore (yellow card) 70'; Bukovec (yellow card) 83'	Report	Cowart (yellow card) 37'; De Filippo 71' (pen.)	Stadium: McMahon Stadium; Attendance: 2,881; Referee: Salma Flores-Desrochers; Assistant referees: Megan Opatril; Shukwia Tajik

==== Playoffs ====
===== Semi-finals =====
November 4 First leg	Vancouver Rise	2–1	Ottawa Rapid	Burnaby, British Columbia
19:00 PT	Abdu 14', 21'; McAslan (yellow card) 90+4'	Report	Pridham 66'; Fridlund (yellow card) 77'; Adamek (yellow card) 90+5'	Stadium: Swangard Stadium; Referee: Carly Shaw-MacLaren; Assistant referees: Stéphanie Fortin; Shukwia Tajik

November 8 Second leg	Ottawa Rapid	2–1 (a.e.t.) (3–3 agg.) (4–5 p)	Vancouver Rise	Ottawa, Ontario
12:00 PT	Pridham 27', (yellow card) 90+4'; Golen (yellow card) 45+1'; Forbes 49'; Scott (yellow card) 63'; Lee (yellow card) 76'; Ellen Gibson (yellow card) 113'	Report	Ward 84'; Abdu (yellow card) 112'; Chang (yellow card) 112'	Stadium: TD Place Stadium; Attendance: 3,068; Referee: Salma Flores-Desrochers; Assistant referees: Gabrielle Lemieux; Camille Raymond
	Penalties
	Pridham (penalty scored); Harris (penalty scored); Forbes (penalty scored); Amano (penalty scored); Haaland (penalty missed); Benati (penalty missed)		(penalty missed) Pechersky; (penalty scored) Stanton; (penalty scored) Sawan; (penalty scored) Lee; (penalty scored) Abdu; (penalty scored) Hagman

===== Final =====
November 15	AFC Toronto	1–2	Vancouver Rise	Toronto, Ontario
11:00 PT	Hunter 20'; Stratigakis (yellow card) 27'; Okoronkwo (yellow card) 52'; Barnett (yellow card) 74'; Rollins (yellow card) 74'; Pickett (yellow card) 82'	Report	Cota-Yarde 54' (o.g.); Ward 68'; Chang (yellow card) 72'; Abdu (yellow card) 82'; Spencer (yellow card) 90+4'	Stadium: BMO Field; Attendance: 12,429; Referee: Marie-Soleil Beaudoin; Assistant referees: Stéphanie Fortin; Camille Raymond

== Statistics ==
As of November 15, 2025

=== Appearances and goals ===
No.	Pos	Nat	Player	Total		NSL		Playoffs	
No.	Pos	Nat	Player	Apps	Goals	Apps	Goals	Apps	Goals
Goalkeepers
1	GK	(Canada) CAN	Kirstin Tynan	1	0	1	0	0	0
13	GK	(Canada) CAN	Morgan McAslan	27	0	24	0	3	0
31	GK	(Japan) JPN	Jessica Wulf	0	0	0	0	0	0
Defenders
2	DF	(Canada) CAN	Shannon Woeller	14	0	14	0	0	0
3	DF	(United States) USA	Jasmyne Spencer	27	2	22+2	2	3	0
4	DF	(Canada) CAN	Kayla Gonçalves	2	0	0+2	0	0	0
12	DF	(Canada) CAN	Jaylyn Wright	22	0	15+7	0	0	0
15	DF	(Canada) CAN	Ariel Young	9	0	5+4	0	0	0
16	DF	(Canada) CAN	Kennedy Faulknor	14	0	8+6	0	0	0
18	DF	(Japan) JPN	Yuka Okamoto	16	0	11+2	0	3	0
21	DF	(Philippines) PHI	Jessika Cowart	23	0	16+4	0	3	0
23	DF	(New Zealand) NZL	Rebecca Lake	8	0	4+1	0	3	0
34	DF	(Canada) CAN	Bridget Mutipula	6	0	2+3	0	0+1	0
38	DF	(Canada) CAN	Chloe Taylor	3	0	3	0	0	0
Midfielders
5	MF	(Canada) CAN	Quinn	21	6	16+2	6	3	0
6	MF	(Sweden) SWE	Sofia Hagman	13	0	1+11	0	0+1	0
7	MF	(United States) USA	Nikki Stanton	22	1	12+7	1	0+3	0
8	MF	(Canada) CAN	Samantha Chang	26	4	22+1	4	3	0
10	MF	(Canada) CAN	Lisa Pechersky	27	4	23+1	4	3	0
14	MF	(Canada) CAN	Anna Bout	8	0	0+6	0	0+2	0
17	MF	(Sweden) SWE	Sara Lilja Vidlund	1	0	0+1	0	0	0
24	MF	(Wales) WAL	Josie Longhurst	21	0	15+5	0	0+1	0
26	MF	(Algeria) ALG	Anaïs Oularbi	3	0	0+3	0	0	0
33	MF	(Canada) CAN	Sienna Gibson	2	0	0+2	0	0	0
36	MF	(Canada) CAN	Emily Wong	5	0	3+2	0	0	0
Forwards
9	FW	(United States) USA	Mariah Lee	26	5	13+10	5	0+3	0
11	FW	(Canada) CAN	Jessica De Filippo	25	7	12+10	7	3	0
19	FW	(Canada) CAN	Holly Ward	28	8	24+1	6	3	2
25	FW	(Egypt) EGY	Nedya Sawan	7	0	2+4	0	0+1	0
28	FW	(Canada) CAN	Jaime Perrault	0	0	0	0	0	0
49	FW	(Jamaica) JAM	Jade Mitchell	2	0	0+2	0	0	0
99	FW	(Canada) CAN	Latifah Abdu	10	5	7	3	3	2

Source: Competitions

=== Goalscorers ===
Rank	No.	Pos	Nat	Name	NSL	Playoffs	Total
1	19	FW	(Canada)	Holly Ward	6	2	8
2	11	FW	(Canada)	Jessica De Filippo	7	0	7
3	5	MF	(Canada)	Quinn	6	0	6
4	99	FW	(Canada)	Latifah Abdu	3	2	5
4	9	FW	(United States)	Mariah Lee	5	0	5
6	8	MF	(Canada)	Samantha Chang	4	0	4
6	16	MF	(Canada)	Lisa Pechersky	4	0	4
8	3	DF	(United States)	Jasmyne Spencer	2	0	2
9	7	MF	(United States)	Nikki Stanton	1	0	1

=== Assists ===
Rank	No.	Pos	Nat	Player	NSL	Playoffs	Total
1	5	MF	(Canada)	Quinn	6		6
2	19	FW	(Canada)	Holly Ward	5		5
3	8	MF	(Canada)	Samantha Chang	3	1	4
3	10	MF	(Canada)	Lisa Pechersky	4		4
5	11	FW	(Canada)	Jessica De Filippo	1	2	3
6	6	MF	(Sweden)	Sofia Hagman	1		1
6	7	MF	(United States)	Nikki Stanton	1		1
6	9	FW	(United States)	Mariah Lee	1		1
6	18	DF	(Japan)	Yuka Okamoto	1		1
6	24	MF	(Wales)	Josie Longhurst	1		1
6	34	DF	(Canada)	Bridget Mutipula	1		1
6	99	FW	(Canada)	Latifah Abdu	1		1

=== Clean sheets ===
Rank	No.	Pos	Nat	Name	NSL	Playoffs	Total
1	13	GK	(Canada)	Morgan McAslan	9	0	9

=== Disciplinary record ===
No.	Pos	Nat	Player	NSL			Playoffs			Total		
No.	Pos	Nat	Player	Booked	(yellow card) (yellow-red card)	Sent off (straight red)	Booked	(yellow card) (yellow-red card)	Sent off (straight red)	Booked	(yellow card) (yellow-red card)	Sent off (straight red)
1	GK	(Canada)	Kirstin Tynan	0	0	0	0	0	0	0	0	0
13	GK	(Canada)	Morgan McAslan	1	0	0	1	0	0	2	0	0
31	GK	(Canada)	Jessica Wulf	0	0	0	0	0	0	0	0	0
2	DF	(Canada)	Shannon Woeller	1	0	0	0	0	0	1	0	0
3	DF	(United States)	Jasmyne Spencer	2	1	0	1	0	0	3	1	0
4	DF	(Canada)	Kayla Gonçalves	0	0	0	0	0	0	0	0	0
12	DF	(Canada)	Jaylyn Wright	1	0	0	0	0	0	1	0	0
15	DF	(Canada)	Ariel Young	0	0	0	0	0	0	0	0	0
16	DF	(Canada)	Kennedy Faulknor	1	0	0	0	0	0	1	0	0
18	DF	(Japan)	Yuka Okamoto	1	0	0	0	0	0	1	0	0
21	DF	(Philippines)	Jessika Cowart	2	0	0	0	0	0	2	0	0
23	DF	(New Zealand)	Rebecca Lake	1	0	0	0	0	0	1	0	0
34	DF	(Canada)	Bridget Mutipula	0	0	0	0	0	0	0	0	0
38	DF	(Canada)	Chloe Taylor	0	0	0	0	0	0	0	0	0
5	MF	(Canada)	Quinn	1	0	0	0	0	0	1	0	0
6	MF	(Sweden)	Sofia Hagman	1	0	0	0	0	0	1	0	0
7	MF	(United States)	Nikki Stanton	3	0	0	0	0	0	3	0	0
8	MF	(Canada)	Samantha Chang	2	0	0	2	0	0	4	0	0
10	MF	(Canada)	Lisa Pechersky	1	0	0	0	0	0	1	0	0
14	MF	(Canada)	Anna Bout	0	0	0	0	0	0	0	0	0
17	MF	(Sweden)	Sara Lilja Vidlund	0	0	0	0	0	0	0	0	0
24	MF	(Wales)	Josie Longhurst	2	0	0	0	0	0	2	0	0
26	MF	(Algeria)	Anaïs Oularbi	0	0	0	0	0	0	0	0	0
33	MF	(Canada)	Sienna Gibson	0	0	0	0	0	0	0	0	0
36	MF	(Canada)	Emily Wong	0	0	0	0	0	0	0	0	0
9	FW	(United States)	Mariah Lee	1	0	0	1	0	0	2	0	0
11	FW	(Canada)	Jessica De Filippo	4	0	1	0	0	0	4	0	1
19	FW	(Canada)	Holly Ward	0	0	0	0	0	0	0	0	0
25	FW	(Egypt)	Nedya Sawan	2	0	0	0	0	0	2	0	0
28	FW	(Canada)	Jaime Perrault	0	0	0	0	0	0	0	0	0
49	FW	(Jamaica) (Canada)	Jade Mitchell	0	0	0	0	0	0	0	0	0
99	FW	(Canada)	Latifah Abdu	1	0	0	2	0	0	3	0	0

== Honours ==
=== Northern Super League Awards ===
Award	Player	Source
Golden Glove	Morgan McAslan	
NSL Final MVP	Morgan McAslan	

=== Monthly Honours ===
Player of the Month
Month	Player	Source
September	Quinn	

Intact Impact Award
Month	Player	Source
July	Shannon Woeller	
December	Jasmyne Spencer	

=== Weekly Honours ===
Stars of the Week
Week	Player(s)	Source
1	Holly Ward	
3	Quinn	
10	Lisa Pechersky	
14	Holly Ward (2)	
15	Samantha Chang	
16	Holly Ward (3)	
18	Jessica De Filippo	
19	Samantha Chang (2)	
20	Lisa Pechersky (2)	
21	Quinn (2)	
26	Jessica De Filippo (2)	

Rookie of the Week
Week	Player(s)	Source
3	Holly Ward	
6	Emily Wong	
19	Holly Ward (2)	
19	Holly Ward (3)	
21	Holly Ward (4)	

Goal of the Week
Week	Player(s)	Source
1	Quinn	
16	Quinn (2)	
18	Jessica De Filippo	
20	Lisa Pechersky	
21	Jessica De Filippo (2)	

Move of the Week
Week	Player(s)	Source
1	Holly Ward	
3	Quinn; Nedya Sawan	
15	Lisa Pechersky	
19	Lisa Pechersky (2)	
24	Quinn (2)	

Save of the Week
Week	Player(s)	Source
4	Morgan McAslan	
10	Morgan McAslan (2)	
18	Morgan McAslan (3)	

=== Club Awards ===
Award	Player	Source
Rise Defensive MVP	Jessika Cowart	
Rise Offensive MVP	Jessica De Filippo	
Rise Excellence Award	Samantha Chang	
Rise Ambassador Award	Kirstin Tynan; Shannon Woeller	
Together We Rise Award	Nikki Stanton	

== Transfers ==
=== In ===
No.	Pos.	Player	From club	Fee/notes	Date	Source
2	DF	(Canada) Shannon Woeller	(Sweden) Vittsjö GIK		December 17, 2024	
11	FW	(Canada) Jessica De Filippo	(Canada) Whitecaps FC Girls Elite		December 17, 2024	
24	MF	(Wales) Josie Longhurst	(Canada) Whitecaps FC Girls Elite		December 19, 2024	
13	GK	(Canada) Morgan McAslan	(Canada) Whitecaps FC Girls Elite		December 19, 2024	
15	DF	(Canada) Ariel Young	(Denmark) Fortuna Hjørring		December 20, 2024	
1	GK	(Canada) Kirstin Tynan	(Canada) TSS Rovers		January 8, 2025	
7	MF	(United States) Nikki Stanton	(United States) Seattle Reign	Free	January 9, 2025	
5	MF	(Canada) Quinn	(United States) Seattle Reign	Free, Designated player	January 16, 2025	
25	FW	(Egypt) Nedya Sawan	(United States) Westside Timbers		January 21, 2025	
6	MF	(Sweden) Sofia Hagman	(Sweden) Vittsjö GIK		January 22, 2025	
8	MF	(Canada) Samantha Chang	(Denmark) HB Køge	Fee undisclosed	January 23, 2025	
4	DF	(Canada) Kayla Gonçalves	(Portugal) Famalicão		January 28, 2025	
31	GK	(Japan) Jessica Wulf	(Japan) Nippon TV Tokyo Verdy Beleza		February 1, 2025	
3	DF	(United States) Jasmyne Spencer	(United States) Angel City		February 3, 2025	
21	DF	(Philippines) Jessika Cowart	(Australia) Perth Glory		February 4, 2025	
12	DF	(Canada) Jaylyn Wright	(United States) Fresno State Bulldogs		February 5, 2025	
10	MF	(Canada) Lisa Pechersky	(Sweden) Vittsjö GIK		February 5, 2025	
9	FW	(United States) Mariah Lee	(United States) DC Power		February 6, 2025	
17	MF	(Sweden) Sara Lilja Vidlund	(Sweden) Djurgårdens IF		February 6, 2025	
16	DF	(Canada) Kennedy Faulknor	(United States) Minnesota Aurora		February 12, 2025	
19	FW	(Canada) Holly Ward	(Canada) Burnaby FC		February 14, 2025	
26	MF	(Algeria) Anaïs Oularbi	(Canada) CS Mont-Royal Outremont		February 17, 2025	
18	DF	(Japan) Yuka Okamoto	(Japan) AC Nagano Parceiro		July 22, 2025	
14	MF	(Canada) Anna Bout	(Denmark) Odense Boldklub Q		August 16, 2025	
99	FW	(Canada) Latifah Abdu	(Canada) Montreal Roses	Fee undisclosed, Do-not-play clause for 2025 regular season matches against Montreal Roses (nullified)	August 30, 2025	
28	FW	(Canada) Jaime Perrault	(Denmark) FC Nordsjælland		September 5, 2025	
28	DF	(New Zealand) Rebecca Lake	(New Zealand) Wellington Phoenix		September 11, 2025	

=== Loans in ===
No.	Pos.	Player	From club	Fee/notes	Date	Source
33	MF	(Canada) Sienna Gibson	(Canada) Altitude FC	Youth development permit	April 27, 2025	
36	MF	(Canada) Emily Wong	(Canada) Vancouver Rise Academy	Youth development permit	May 15, 2025	
38	DF	(Canada) Chloe Taylor	(Canada) Vancouver Rise Academy	Youth development permit	May 15, 2025	
49	FW	(Jamaica) (Canada) Jade Mitchell	(Canada) Vancouver Rise Academy	Youth development permit	May 15, 2025	
34	MF	(Canada) Bridget Mutipula	(Canada) Vancouver Rise Academy	Youth development permit	August 9, 2025	

== Injuries ==
No.	Pos.	Player	Injury	Date	Status	Source
17	MF	(Sweden) Sara Lilja Vidlund	Suffered an anterior cruciate ligament injury during training.	May 10, 2025	Season-ending	
5	MF	(Canada) Quinn	Suffered an injury between May 11 and May 15.	May 11, 2025	Returned June 7, 2025 in the match against Montreal Roses.	
7	MF	(United States) Nikki Stanton	Suffered an injury between May 11 and May 15.	May 11, 2025	Returned July 12, 2025 in the match against Calgary Wild.	
15	DF	(Canada) Ariel Young	Suffered an anterior cruciate ligament injury in the match against AFC Toronto.	July 24, 2025	Season-ending	
2	DF	(Canada) Shannon Woeller	Suffered an anterior cruciate ligament injury in the match against Ottawa Rapid.	August 2, 2025	Season-ending	
