= Bridget Mutipula =

Canadian soccer player (born 2008)

- Mutipula with Florida State in 2026

Personal information
- Date of birth: August 5, 2008 (age 18)
- Place of birth: Zambia
- Height: 1.68 m (5 ft 6 in)
- Position: Defender

Team information
- Current team: Florida State Seminoles
- Number: 5

Youth career
- Halifax Dunbrack SC
- 2023–2024: Whitecaps FC Girls Elite

College career
Years	Team	Apps	(Gls)
2026–	Florida State Seminoles	7	(0)

Senior career*
Years	Team	Apps	(Gls)
2023–2026	Vancouver Rise FC Academy (Note: Whitecaps FC Girls Elite re-branded as the Vancouver Rise FC Academy in 2025)	24	(4)
2025–2026	→ Vancouver Rise FC (loan)	5	(0)

International career^{‡}
2024–2025	Canada U17	7	(0)
- * Club domestic league appearances and goals as of October 17, 2025 ‡ National team caps and goals as of April 6, 2025

Bridget Mutipula (born August 5, 2008) is a college soccer player who plays as a defender for the Florida State Seminoles. Born in Zambia, she is a youth international for Canada.

== Early life ==
Born in Zambia, Mutipula moved to Canada at age four. She began playing youth soccer at age 8 with Halifax Dunbrack SC, also participating in the Nova Scotia REX program, before joining the Whitecaps FC Girls Elite program in June 2023.

== Club career ==
In 2023, Mutipula began playing with Whitecaps FC Girls Elite (later renamed Vancouver Rise FC Academy) in League1 British Columbia. In 2024, she played with the squad at the 2024–25 CONCACAF W Champions Cup. In August 2025, she joined Vancouver Rise FC in the Northern Super League on a Youth Development Permit. She made her professional debut on August 9, 2025, against Halifax Tides FC.

== International career ==
In November 2023, Mutipula was called up to the Canada U17 team for the first time for a training camp and friendliers against Portugal U17. In 2024, she was named to the roster for the 2024 CONCACAF Women's U-17 Championship. In May 2026, she was called up to the Canada U20 for a pair of international friendlies.

== Career statistics ==
As of November 8, 2025

Club	Season	League			Playoffs		Domestic Cup		Continental		Other		Total	
Club	Season	Division	Apps	Goals	Apps	Goals	Apps	Goals	Apps	Goals	Apps	Goals	Apps	Goals
Vancouver Rise FC Academy	2023	League1 British Columbia	3	1	1	0	—		—		2 (Note: Appearance(s) in Women's Inter-Provincial Championship)	0	6	1
Vancouver Rise FC Academy	2024	League1 British Columbia	9	0	2	0	—		4	0	2	0	17	0
Vancouver Rise FC Academy	2025	League1 British Columbia	12	3	—		—		3	0	—		15	3
Vancouver Rise FC Academy	Total		24	4	3	0	0	0	7	0	4	0	38	4
Vancouver Rise FC (loan)	2025	Northern Super League	5	0	1	0	—		—		—		6	0
Career total			29	4	4	0	0	0	7	0	4	0	44	4
