= McAslan =

McAslan is a surname. Notable people with the surname include:

- John McAslan (born 1954), Scottish architect
- Kirsten McAslan (born 1993), British sprinter
- Morgan McAslan (born 2000), Canadian soccer player
- Sean McAslan (born 1980), Canadian ice hockey player
