= Jessica De Filippo =

Canadian soccer player (born 2001)

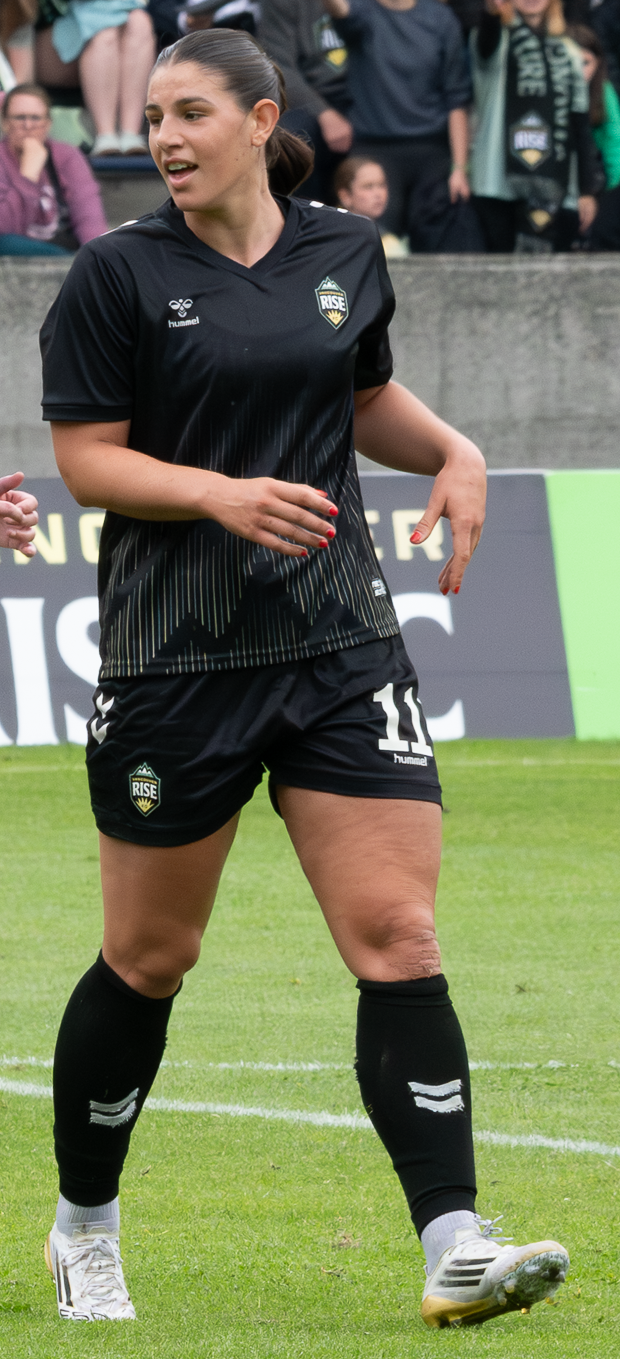
- De Filippo playing for Vancouver Rise FC in 2025

Personal information
- Full name: Jessica Christina De Filippo
- Date of birth: April 20, 2001 (age 25)
- Place of birth: Mississauga, Ontario, Canada
- Height: 1.79 m (5 ft 10 in)
- Position: Forward

Team information
- Current team: Vancouver Rise FC
- Number: 11

Youth career
- CS Saint-Lazare
- 2009–2018: Lakeshore SC

College career
Years	Team	Apps	(Gls)
2019–2020	Louisville Cardinals	21	(2)
2021–2022	Arkansas Razorbacks	31	(14)

Senior career*
Years	Team	Apps	(Gls)
2018	Lakers du Lac St-Louis	10	(4)
2019	CS Monteuil	5	(0)
2021	Chicago Red Stars Reserves	5	(2)
2022	AS Laval	4	(1)
2023	Turbine Potsdam	11	(2)
2023–2024	Sporting de Huelva	18	(1)
2024	Whitecaps FC Girls Elite	1	(0)
2025–	Vancouver Rise	22	(7)

International career^{‡}
2018	Canada U17	6	(1)
2019	Canada U18	2	(0)
2018	Canada U20	2	(0)
- * Club domestic league appearances and goals as of 17 October 2025 ‡ National team caps and goals as of December 1, 2018

Jessica Christina De Filippo (born April 20, 2001) is a Canadian professional women's soccer player who plays as a forward for Vancouver Rise FC in the Northern Super League.

== Early life ==
Born in Mississauga, Ontario, De Filippo moved to Montreal, Quebec with her family at the age of one. She began playing soccer at age four with CS Saint-Lazare. She later played with Lakeshore SC. She also trained with the Soccer Quebec’s National Training Centre program and in 2015 was named to the Team Quebec U17 team. In 2016, she was named the Sports Quebec Female Athlete of the Year in a team sport. In 2017, she represented Quebec at the 2017 Canada Summer Games, helping them win their first gold medal in the sport and finishing as the tournament's top scorer and being named to the tournament All-Star Team.

== College career ==
In 2019, De Filippo began attending the University of Louisville, where she played for the women's soccer team. On September 1, 2019, she scored her first collegiate goal in a victory over the Eastern Michigan Eagles.

In November 2020, she decided to transfer to the University of Arkansas to play for the women's soccer team in 2021. Ahead of her junior and senior seasons, she was named to the Southeastern Conference preseason watchlist. On November 11, 2022, she scored a hat trick in a 6-0 victory over the Missouri State Lady Bears. A week later, she was named the National Player of the Week. In her senior season, she led the team in goals with 12, as well as in points and shots.

== Club career ==
In 2018, she played with the Lakers du Lac St-Louis in the Première ligue de soccer du Québec and was selected to the roster for the PLSQ-League1 Ontario All-Star Game. In 2019, she played with CS Monteuil.

In 2021, she played with the Chicago Red Stars Reserves in the Women's Premier Soccer League, winning the conference title.

In 2022, she returned to the PLSQ and played with her previous club, AS Laval (formerly CS Monteuil).

In February 2023, she signed with German club Turbine Potsdam in the Frauen-Bundesliga. She departed the club at the end of the season.

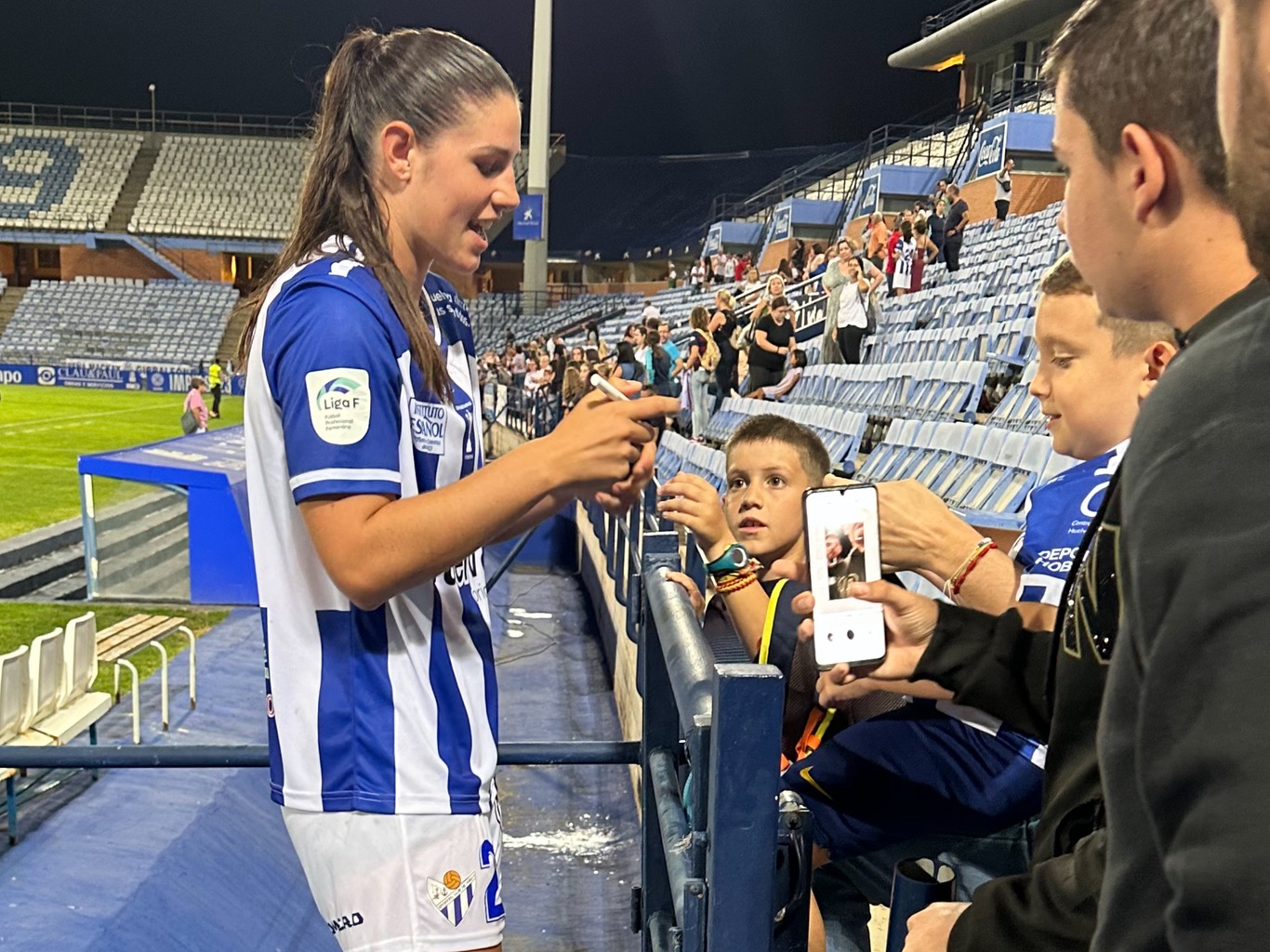
De Filippo signing autographs after a match in October 2023

In July 2023, she signed with Spanish club Sporting de Huelva in the first tier Liga F. On November 8, 2023, she scored the winning goal in a 1-0 victory over Real Unión de Tenerife to help the team advance to the Round of 16 in the 2023–24 Copa de la Reina de Fútbol.

In July 2024, she joined the Whitecaps FC Girls Elite in League1 British Columbia, making her debut on July 20 against Rivers FC. On August 9, 2024, she scored a brace in a 2-0 victory over Calgary Blizzard SC in the semi-finals of the League1 Canada Women's Inter-Provincial Championship.

In December 2024, she signed with Northern Super League club Vancouver Rise FC ahead of the inaugural 2025 season. She scored her first goal for the Rise on May 11, 2025, scoring a header in the 94th minute to equalize in a 1-1 draw against AFC Toronto. She received a red card in the sixth minute of added time at the end of the first half in Vancouver's 7-0 loss against Toronto on September 13, 2025. She was a part of the squad which won the inaugural Diana B. Matheson Cup following a 2-1 win over Toronto in November 2025, and was named the Rise's offensive MVP for the 2025 season.

== International career ==
In 2013, she represented Canada at the U12 Boys Danone Nations Cup tournament.

In June 2014, she made her debut in the Canadian national program attending a camp with the Canada U15 team. In 2018, she played with the Canada U17, helping them to a fourth place finish at the 2018 FIFA U-17 Women's World Cup. She also played with the Canada U20 team, including being named to the squad for the 2018 CONCACAF Women's U-20 Championship.

In October 2019, she was called up to the Canada senior team for the first time, ahead of a friendly against Japan. At the end of 2019, she was nominated for the Canada Soccer Young Player of the Year.

== Career statistics ==
As of November 17, 2025

Club	League	Season	League		Playoffs		Domestic Cup		Continental		Other		Total	
Club	League	Season	Apps	Goals	Apps	Goals	Apps	Goals	Apps	Goals	Apps	Goals	Apps	Goals
Lakers du Lac St-Louis	Première ligue de soccer du Québec	2018	10	4	—		—		—		—		10	4
CS Monteuil	Première ligue de soccer du Québec	2019	5	0	—		—		—		—		5	0
Chicago Red Stars Reserves	Women's Premier Soccer League	2021	5	2	0	0	—		—		—		5	2
AS Laval	Première ligue de soccer du Québec	2022	4	1	—		—		—		0	0	4	1
Turbine Potsdam	Frauen-Bundesliga	2022–23	11	2	—		0	0	—		—		11	2
Sporting de Huelva	Liga F	2023–24	18	1	—		1	1	—		2 (Note: Appearance(s) in Copa de Andalucía)	0	21	2
Whitecaps FC Elite	League1 British Columbia	2024	1	0	1	0	—		5 (Note: Appearance(s) in the 2024–25 CONCACAF W Champions Cup)	0	2 (Note: Appearance(s) in the Women's Inter-Provincial Championship)	2	9	2
Vancouver Rise FC	Northern Super League	2025	22	7	3	0	—		—		—		25	7
Career total			76	17	4	0	1	1	5	0	4	2	89	20
