= Emily Wong (soccer) =

Canadian soccer player (born 2007)

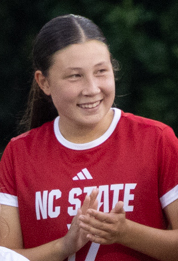
- Wong with NC State in 2025

Personal information
- Full name: Emily Lauren Wong
- Date of birth: July 9, 2007 (age 19)
- Place of birth: Coquitlam, British Columbia, Canada
- Height: 1.65 m (5 ft 5 in)
- Position: Defender

Team information
- Current team: NC State Wolfpack
- Number: 17

Youth career
- Coquitlam Metro-Ford SC
- 2022–: Whitecaps FC Girls Elite

College career
Years	Team	Apps	(Gls)
2025–	NC State Wolfpack	11	(1)

Senior career*
Years	Team	Apps	(Gls)
2022–	Vancouver Rise FC Academy (Note: Whitecaps FC Girls Elite re-branded as the Vancouver Rise FC Academy in 2025)	21	(0)
2025–	→ Vancouver Rise FC (loan)	5	(0)

International career^{‡}
2022	Canada U15	2	(0)
2022–2024	Canada U17	7	(1)
- * Club domestic league appearances and goals as of July 15, 2025 ‡ National team caps and goals as of February 11, 2024

Emily Lauren Wong (born July 9, 2007) is a Canadian soccer player who plays as a defender for the NC State Wolfpack.

== Early life ==
Wong began playing youth soccer at age five with Coquitlam Metro-Ford SC. In 2-22, she joined the Whitecaps FC Girls Elite Academy.

== College career ==
In 2025, Wong began playing for the NC State Wolfpack.

== Club career ==
In 2022, she began playing with the Whitecaps FC Girls Elite (later re-branded Vancouver Rise FC Academy) in League1 British Columbia. On August 15, 2024, she scored the first ever goal in the CONCACAF W Champions Cup, netting the winning goal on a penalty kick in a 1-0 victory over El Salvadoran club Alianza in the preliminary round. In May 2025, she signed a youth development permit with Northern Super League club Vancouver Rise FC. In late May 2025, she was named the league's Rookie of the Week.

== International career ==
In July 2022, Wong debuted in the Canada national program, being named to the Canada U15 for the 2022 CONCACAF Girls' U-15 Championship.

In September 2022, she was named to the Canada U17 for the 2022 FIFA U-17 Women's World Cup. In January 2024, she was named to the squad for the 2024 CONCACAF Women's U-17 Championship.

== Career statistics ==
As of July 15, 2025

Club	Season	League			Playoffs		Domestic Cup		Continental		Other		Total	
Club	Season	Division	Apps	Goals	Apps	Goals	Apps	Goals	Apps	Goals	Apps	Goals	Apps	Goals
Vancouver Rise FC Academy	2022	League1 British Columbia	5	0	0	0	—		—		—		5	0
Vancouver Rise FC Academy	2023	League1 British Columbia	1	0	0	0	—		—		2 (Note: Appearance(s) in Women's Inter-Provincial Championship)	0	3	0
Vancouver Rise FC Academy	2024	League1 British Columbia	8	0	2	0	—		3	1	2	0	15	1
Vancouver Rise FC Academy	2025	League1 British Columbia	7	0	—		—		—		—		7	0
Vancouver Rise FC Academy	Total		21	0	2	0	0	0	3	1	4	0	30	1
Vancouver Rise FC (loan)	2025	Northern Super League	5	0	0	0	—		—		—		5	0
Career total			26	0	2	0	0	0	3	1	4	0	35	1
