= Jade Mitchell =

Jade Mitchell may refer to:

- Jade Mitchell (footballer) (born 2007), Jamaican-Canadian footballer
- Jade Mitchell (Neighbours), a fictional character in the Australian soap opera Neighbours
