= Samantha Chang =

Samantha Chang may refer to:

- Samantha Chang (soccer) (born 2000), Canadian soccer player
- Lan Samantha Chang (born 1965), American author
