= Diana Meriva =

Equatoguinean footballer (born 2002)

Personal information
- Full name: Diana Sandra Meriva Bilelo
- Date of birth: 3 March 2002 (age 24)
- Place of birth: Malabo, Equatorial Guinea
- Height: 1.70 m (5 ft 7 in)
- Position: Winger

Team information
- Current team: Gil Vicente

Senior career*
Years	Team	Apps	(Gls)
- Estrellas del Sur
- Estrellas de Guadalupe
2017–2020	Atlético Malabo		
2020–2022	Inter Malabo		
2023–2024	Bragalona	22	(32)
2024–2026	Famalicão	1	(1)
2026–	Gil Vicente	0	(0)

International career^{‡}
2019	Equatorial Guinea U20		
2018–	Equatorial Guinea	1	(0)
- * Club domestic league appearances and goals as of 1 September 2024 ‡ National team caps and goals as of 20 June 2019

Diana Sandra Meriva Bilelo (born 3 March 2002) is an Equatoguinean footballer who plays as a winger for Campeonato Nacional Feminino club Gil Vicente and the Equatorial Guinea national team.

== Club career ==
Meriva has played for Estrellas del Sur, Estrellas de Guadalupe, Atlético Malabo and Inter Malabo in Equatorial Guinea and for Bragalona and Famalicão in Portugal.

== International career ==
Meriva capped for Equatorial Guinea at senior level during the 2018 Africa Women Cup of Nations, playing in one match. She also represented the country at under-20 level at the 2019 African Games.
