= Nedya Sawan =

Egyptian footballer (born 2002)

Personal information
- Date of birth: 22 April 2002 (age 24)
- Place of birth: Beaverton, Oregon, United States
- Height: 1.73 m (5 ft 8 in)
- Position: Forward

Youth career
- FC Portland

College career
| Years | Team | Apps | (Gls) |
| 2020–2023 | Portland Pilots | 63 | (26) |
| 2024 | Alabama Crimson Tide | 21 | (6) |

Senior career*
| Years | Team | Apps | (Gls) |
| 2021–2022 | Westside Timbers SC | | |
| 2024–2024 | United PDX | 13 | (18) |
| 2025 | Vancouver Rise | 7 | (0) |
| 2025 | → Vancouver Rise FC Academy | 0 | (0) |

International career^{‡}
| 2025– | Egypt | 2 | (1) |
- * Club domestic league appearances and goals as of October 17, 2025 ‡ National team caps and goals as of 12 April 2025

Nedya Sawan (Egyptian Arabic: نادية صوان; born 22 April 2002) is a footballer who plays as a forward. Born in the United States, she plays for the Egypt national team.

== Early life ==
Sawan played youth soccer with FC Portland and was named the Oregon Gatorade Player of the Year in 2018-19.

== College career ==
In 2020, Sawan began attending the University of Portland, where she played for the women's soccer team. On March 27, 2021, she scored her first two goals in a 3-0 victory over the San Diego Toreros. For October 2021, she was named the school's female Student-Athlete of the Month. On November 6, 2021, she scored a brace in a 2-0 victory over the Pacific Boxers. At the end of the 2021 season, she was named to the All-WCC First Team, the All-West Region Third Team, and the WCC All-Academic First Team. Ahead of the 2022 season, she was named to the WCC All-Preseason Team. At the end of the 2022 season, she was named to the WCC All-Academic First Team and the Academic All-District Team. Ahead of her senior season in 2023, she was again named to the WCC All-Preseason Team. At the end of the 2023 season, Sawan was named to the All-WCC Second Team, All-West Region Second Team, and the Academic All-District Team.

In 2024, she began attending the University of Alabama, where she played for the women's soccer team. On September 1, 2024, she scored her first goal in a 4-0 victory over the Southern Miss Golden Eagles. At the end of the season, she was named to the Academic All-District Team.

== Club career ==
In 2021, she began playing with Westside Timbers SC in the Women's Premier Soccer League. In 2021, she was named the Northwest Conference Offensive Player of the Year and named to the Northwest Conference Best XI. In 2023 and 2024, she played with United PDX in the USL W League.

In January 2025, she signed with Northern Super League club Vancouver Rise FC. In September 2025, she joined the Vancouver Rise FC Academy for the 2025–26 CONCACAF W Champions Cup.

== International career ==
In March 2025, Sawan was called up to the Egypt national team.

== Career statistics ==
As of November 8, 2025

| Club | Season | League | | | Playoffs | | Domestic Cup | | Continental | | Total | |
| Club | Season | Division | Apps | Goals | Apps | Goals | Apps | Goals | Apps | Goals | Apps | Goals |
|---|---|---|---|---|---|---|---|---|---|---|---|---|
| United PDX | 2023 | USL W League | 7 | 10 | — | | — | | — | | 7 | 10 |
| United PDX | 2024 | USL W League | 6 | 8 | — | | — | | — | | 6 | 8 |
| United PDX | Total | | 13 | 18 | 0 | 0 | 0 | 0 | 0 | 0 | 13 | 18 |
| Vancouver Rise FC | 2025 | Northern Super League | 7 | 0 | 1 | 0 | — | | — | | 8 | 0 |
| Vancouver Rise FC Academy (loan) | 2025 | League1 British Columbia | 0 | 0 | — | | — | | 1 | 0 | 1 | 0 |
| Career total | | | 20 | 18 | 1 | 0 | 0 | 0 | 1 | 0 | 22 | 18 |
