= Jade Mitchell (footballer) =

Canadian-Jamaican footballer (born 2007)

Personal information
- Full name: Ciara Jade Mitchell
- Date of birth: January 29, 2007 (age 19)
- Place of birth: Port Moody, British Columbia, Canada
- Height: 1.70 m (5 ft 7 in)
- Position: Forward

Youth career
- Port Moody SC
- Premier Academy Vancouver
- Coquitlam Metro-Ford SC
- Langley United SA
- Whitecaps FC Girls Elite

College career
Years	Team	Apps	(Gls)
2025	San Diego State Aztecs	15	(0)
2026–	Texas A&M Aggies	6	(1)

Senior career*
Years	Team	Apps	(Gls)
2023–2024	Altitude FC	18	(5)
2024–2025	Vancouver Rise FC Academy (Note: Whitecaps FC Girls Elite re-branded as the Vancouver Rise FC Academy in 2025)	8	(7)
2025	→ Vancouver Rise FC (loan)	2	(0)
2026	San Juan SC	5	(0)

International career^{‡}
- Jamaica U20
- * Club domestic league appearances and goals as of September 20, 2026 ‡ National team caps and goals as of February 25, 2025

Ciara Jade Mitchell (born January 29, 2007) is a footballer. Born in Canada, she represents Jamaica at international level.

== Early life ==
Mitchell played youth soccer with Port Moody SC, Premier Academy Vancouver, Coquitlam Metro-Ford SC, and Langley United SA.

== College career ==
Mitchell committed to attend San Diego State University in the fall of 2025 to play for the women's soccer team. On August 14, 2025, she made her collegiate debut, in a match against Texas Tech Red Raiders. At the end of the season, she was named to the Academic All-Mountain West.

In 2026, she transferred to Texas A&M University, joining the women's soccer team. On August 22, 2026, she scored her first goal in a 5-0 victor over the Sam Houston Bearkats.

== Club career ==
In 2023, Mitchell played with Altitude FC in League1 British Columbia. In July 2024, she moved to Whitecaps FC Girls Elite (later re-branded as Vancouver Rise FC Academy in 2025).

In May 2025, she signed a youth development permit with Northern Super League club Vancouver Rise FC.

In 2026, she played with San Juan SC in the USL W League.

== International career ==
Mitchell has regularly played for the Jamaica U20.

In June 2025, Mitchell was called up to the Jamaica senior team for the first time.

== Career statistics ==
As of September 20, 2026

Club	Season	League			Playoffs		Domestic Cup		Continental		Other		Total	
Club	Season	Division	Apps	Goals	Apps	Goals	Apps	Goals	Apps	Goals	Apps	Goals	Apps	Goals
Altitude FC	2023	League1 British Columbia	9	0	—		—		—		—		9	0
Altitude FC	2024	League1 British Columbia	9	5	—		—		—		—		9	5
Altitude FC	Total		18	5	0	0	0	0	0	0	0	0	18	5
Vancouver Rise FC Academy	2024	League1 British Columbia	1	0	1	0	—		1	0	1 (Note: Appearance(s) in Women's Inter-Provincial Championship)	0	4	0
Vancouver Rise FC Academy	2025	League1 British Columbia	7	7	0	0	—		—		—		13	4
Vancouver Rise FC Academy	Total		7	7	1	0	0	0	1	0	1	0	11	7
Vancouver Rise FC (loan)	2025	Northern Super League	2	0	—		—		—		—		2	0
San Juan SC	2026	USL W League	5	0	—		—		—		—		5	0
Career total			33	12	1	0	0	0	1	0	1	0	36	12
