= Morgan McAslan =

Canadian soccer player (born 2000)

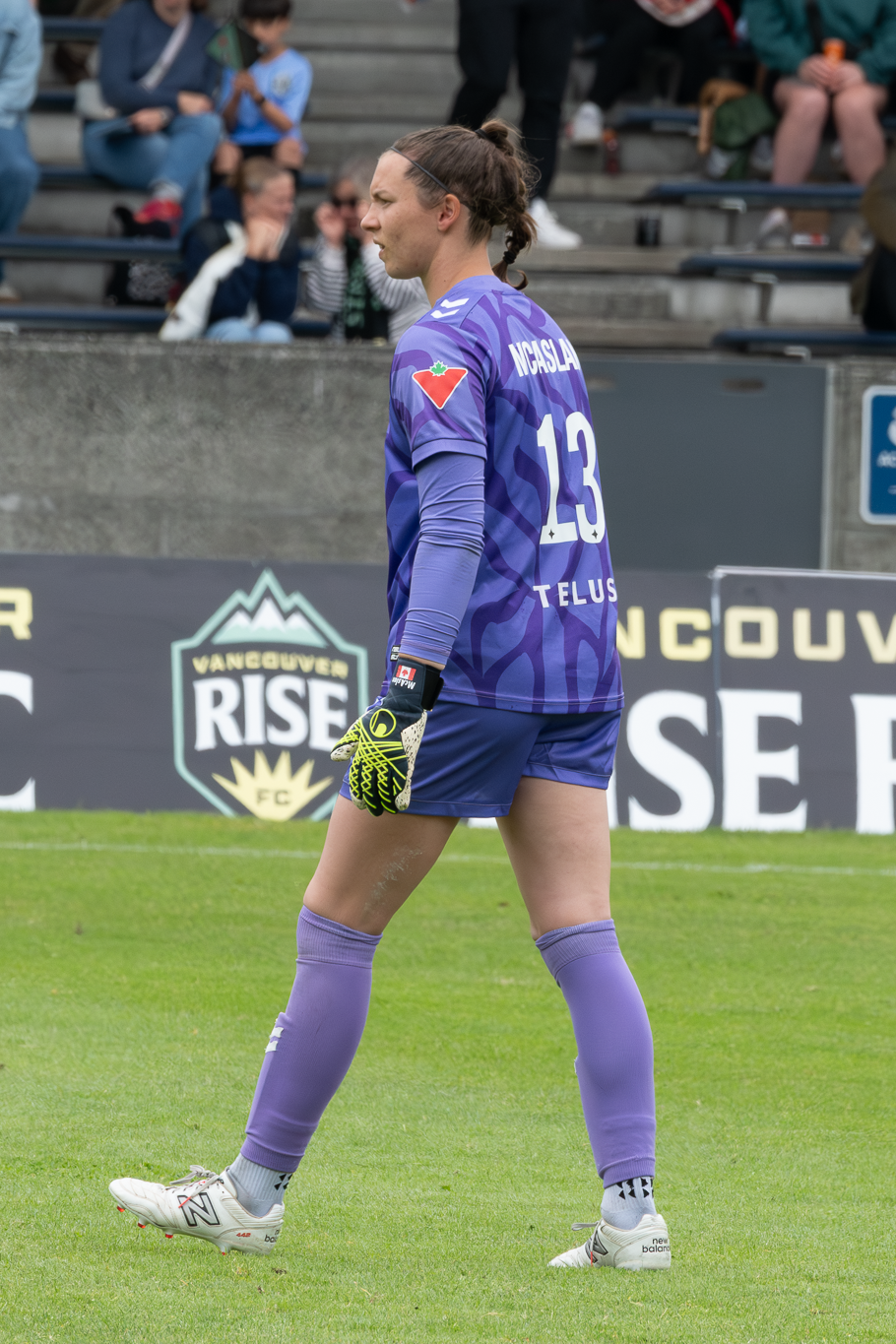
- McAslan playing for Vancouver Rise FC in 2025

Personal information
- Full name: Morgan Ashley McAslan
- Date of birth: February 22, 2000 (age 26)
- Place of birth: Waterdown, Ontario, Canada
- Height: 5 ft 11 in (1.80 m)
- Position: Goalkeeper

Team information
- Current team: Vancouver Rise
- Number: 13

Youth career
- Flamborough Dundas SC
- 2014–2017: Burlington SC

College career
Years	Team	Apps	(Gls)
2018	Ole Miss Rebels	8	(0)
2019–2022	Samford Bulldogs	67	(0)

Senior career*
Years	Team	Apps	(Gls)
2022	Chicago Mustangs		
2024	Whitecaps FC Girls Elite	2	(0)
2025–	Vancouver Rise	37	(0)
- * Club domestic league appearances and goals as of November 9, 2026

Morgan Ashley McAslan (born February 22, 2000) is a Canadian soccer player who plays as a goalkeeper for Vancouver Rise FC in the Northern Super League.

== Early life ==
McAslan played youth soccer with Flamborough Dundas SC and initially played centre midfield before converting to goalkeeper at age 12. From 2014 to 2017 with Burlington SC, while also playing with the Ontario provincial team in 2014 and 2015. She attended Waterdown District High School, where she was named the school's Female Athlete of the Year in 2015–16, and the Waterdown Warrior Award in 2015.

== College career ==
In 2018, McAslan began attending the University of Mississippi, where she played for the women's soccer team. She made her debut on October 7, 2018, combining on following an injury in a match against the Arkansas Razorbacks, subsequently starting the remaining seven matches in the season. In October 2018, she earned SEC Defensive Player of the Week honours.

In 2019, she transferred to Samford University, to play for the women's soccer team. She made her debut on August 22 against the UAB Blazers. In September 2019, she earned Southern Conference (SoCon) Defensive Player of the Week and was named the Southern Conference Defensive Player of the Month for October 2019. She was named the SoCon Tournament Most Outstanding Player and was named an All-SoCon First Team All-Star.

In her second season with Samford, she was named the SoCon Defensive Player of the Week in March 2021 (season delayed from Fall 2020 due to the COVID-19 pandemic. she was also named the SoCon Defensive Player of the Month for March 2021. At the end of the season, she was again named an All-SoCon First Team All-Star. She was also named to the FTF Canada Second Team All-Canadian.

In her third season with Samford in 2021, she was named the SoCon Defensive Player of the Week twice. She was named the SoCon Defensive Player of the Month for both September and October. At the end of the season, she was named an All-SoCon Second Team All-Star. She was also named to the SoCon All-Tournament Team.

In her final season in 2022, she was again named the SoCon Defensive Player Of The Week on two occasions.

== Club career ==
In 2022, McAslan played with the Chicago Mustangs in United Women's Soccer, helping them win the 2022 title.

In July 2024, McAslan joined the Whitecaps FC Girls Elite in League1 British Columbia, making her debut on July 14 against Burnaby FC. She helped the team win the League1 Canada 2024 Women's Inter-Provincial Championship, making a critical save in their penalty shootout victory over CS Mont-Royal Outremont, which qualified the team for the 2024–25 CONCACAF W Champions Cup. On August 15, 2024, in a match against eight-time El Salvador champion Alianza F.C. in the preliminary round of the CONCACAF W Champions Cup, she made an important late match save to seal their victory to advance to the group stage.

In December 2024, she signed with Vancouver Rise in the Northern Super League, ahead of the inaugural 2025 season. McAslan kept a clean sheet in the club's first ever game, a 1-0 victory over the Calgary Wild. She started in all but one of the Rise's games across the 2025 regular season. She won the NSL Golden Glove at the end of the inaugural regular season, having kept 9 clean sheets across the season. She was named player of the match in the inaugural NSL final, helping the Rise to a 2–1 victory over AFC Toronto.

== Coaching career ==
After her collegiate career, McAslan became the head goalkeeping coach with her former youth club Flamborough Dundas SC, before later becoming a volunteer assistant coach at the collegiate level with the Columbus State Cougars women's soccer team in 2023.

== Career statistics ==
As of November 17, 2025

Club	League	Season	League		Playoffs		Domestic Cup		Continental		Other		Total	
Club	League	Season	Apps	Goals	Apps	Goals	Apps	Goals	Apps	Goals	Apps	Goals	Apps	Goals
Whitecaps FC Elite	League1 British Columbia	2024	2	0	1	0	—		5 (Note: Appearance(s) in the 2024–25 CONCACAF W Champions Cup)	0	2 (Note: Appearance(s) in the Women's Inter-Provincial Championship)	0	10	0
Vancouver Rise FC	Northern Super League	2025	24	0	3	0	—		—		—		27	0
Vancouver Rise FC	Northern Super League	2026	12	0	2	0	1	0	—		—		15	0
Career total			38	0	6	0	1	0	5	0	2	0	52	0
