= Anja Heiner-Møller =

Danish footballer (born 1978)

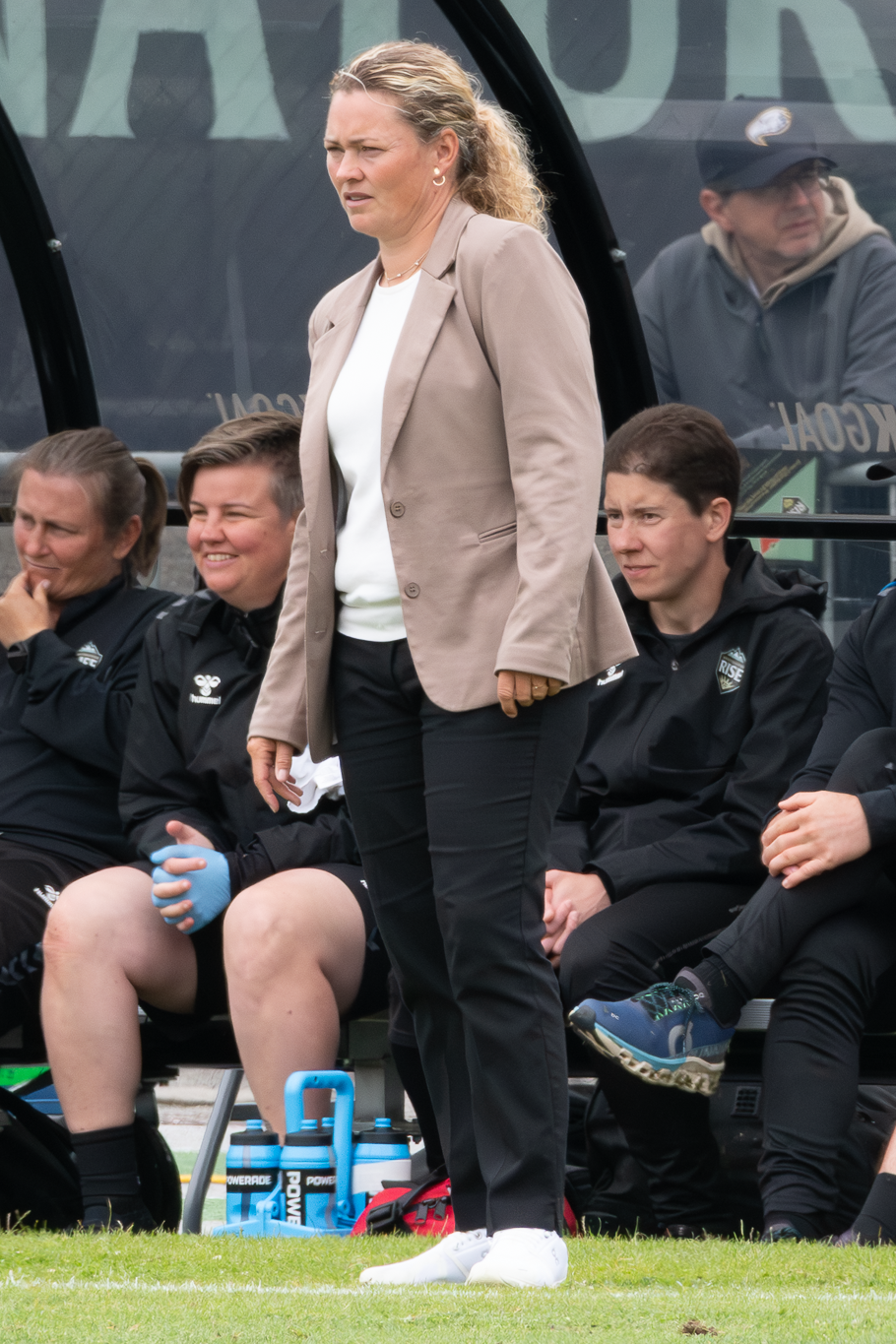
- Heiner-Møller in 2025

Personal information
- Birth name: Anja Møller
- Date of birth: 11 May 1978 (age 48)
- Position: Midfielder

Senior career*
Years	Team	Apps	(Gls)
2000–2001	Hillerød GI		
2001–2003	OB		
2003–2004	Brøndby		

International career
1994	Denmark U17	7	(1)
1995–1999	Denmark U21	30	(5)
1999–2001	Denmark	7	(0)

Managerial career
- 2015: Lyngby Boldklub (academy)
- 2015–2017: FC Helsingør (academy)
- 2018–2020: Whitecaps FC Girls Elite (academy)
- 2018–2020: North Shore Girls SC (academy)
- 2020: BSF
- 2020–2022: FC Nordsjælland U18
- 2020–2022: Denmark U16 (assistant)
- 2022–2024: Denmark U19
- 2025–2026: Vancouver Rise FC
- * Club domestic league appearances and goals

Anja Heiner-Møller (née Møller; born 11 May 1978) is a Danish football coach and former player.

== Club career ==
During her playing career, Heiner-Møller played with Hillerød GI, Odense BK, and Brøndby IF accumulating over 250 career appearances.

== International career ==
Heiner-Møller represented Denmark at international level, accumulating 44 appearances from U16 to senior level, including playing at the UEFA Women's Euro 2001.

== Coaching career ==
From 2015 to 2017, she worked as a girls academy coach with Lyngby Boldklub and FC Helsingør.

Between 2018 and 2020, she worked in Canada serving as an academy coach with both Vancouver Whitecaps FC and North Shore Girls SC.

In September 2020, she returned to Denmark and became the head coach of the BSF first team in the second tier.

In December 2020, she became the head coach of the FC Nordsjælland U18 women's team, also serving as an assistant with Denmark women's U16 team.

In July 2022, Heiner-Møller became the head coach of the Denmark women's U19 team. In November 2024, she announced she would step down as the U19 head coach at the end of 2024 to pursue a new opportunity abroad.

In November 2024, she was announced as the first head coach for Vancouver Rise FC of the Northern Super League, ahead of the inaugural 2025 season. She coached the Rise to a third-place finish in the 2025 season, qualifying for the playoffs. Under her coaching, the Rise finished the season with a 2–1 victory over AFC Toronto in the 2025 NSL final, winning the inaugural Diana B. Matheson Cup. In September 2026, Vancouver chose to part ways with her, ending her tenure with the club.

== Personal life ==
Heiner-Møller is the wife of fellow Danish football coach Kenneth Heiner-Møller.
