= Sienna Gibson =

Canadian soccer player (born 2006)

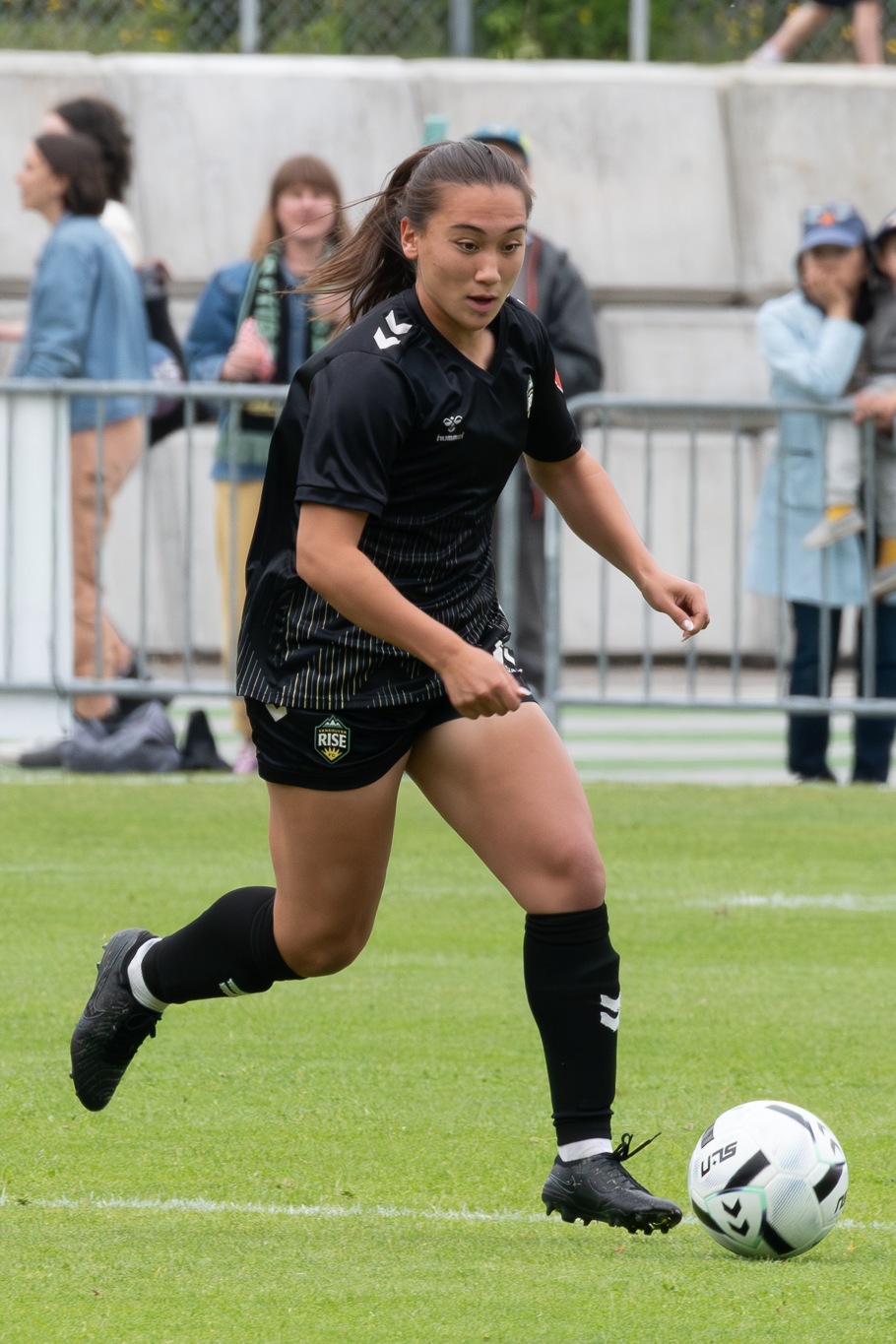
- Gibson playing for Vancouver Rise FC in 2025

Personal information
- Full name: Sienna Momoko Gibson
- Date of birth: September 18, 2006 (age 20)
- Place of birth: Vancouver, British Columbia, Canada
- Height: 1.62 m (5 ft 4 in)
- Position: Midfielder

Team information
- Current team: Altitude FC

Youth career
- Vancouver United FC
- Fusion FC
- 2019–2023: Vancouver Whitecaps FC
- 2024: Fusion FC

College career
Years	Team	Apps	(Gls)
2024–	UBC Thunderbirds	20	(5)

Senior career*
Years	Team	Apps	(Gls)
2023	Whitecaps FC Girls Elite	11	(2)
2025–	Altitude FC	13	(3)
2025	→ Vancouver Rise FC (loan)	3	(0)

International career^{‡}
2023	Ireland U17	1	(0)
2025–	Canada U20	5	(1)
- * Club domestic league appearances and goals as of October 5, 2026 ‡ National team caps and goals as of June 2, 2025

Sienna Momoko Gibson (born September 18, 2006) is a Canadian soccer player who plays for Altitude FC in the British Columbia Premier League.

== Early life ==
Gibson played youth soccer with Vancouver United FC and Fusion FC, before joining the Whitecaps FC Girls Elite in August 2019.

== University career ==
In 2024, Gibson began attending the University of British Columbia. On September 20, 2024, she scored her first goal in a 4–0 victory over the Trinity Western Spartans. On October 26, 2024, she scored two goals in a 7–0 victory over the Alberta Pandas, earning Canada West Player of the Week honours. At the end of the season, she was named to the Canada West All-Rookie Team. She helped UBC win the 2024 U Sports National Championship and was named the Tournament MVP.

== Club career ==
In 2023, Gibson played with Whitecaps FC Girls Elite in League1 British Columbia, winning the league title and the 2023 Blue Stars/FIFA Youth Cup.

In 2025, she began playing with Altitude FC. In April 2025, she joined Vancouver Rise FC in the Northern Super League on a youth development permit.

== International career ==
In February 2023, Gibson was called up to the Ireland U17 for a pair of friendlies against Switzerland U17.

In 2025, Gibson was named to the Canada U20 for the 2025 CONCACAF Women's U-20 Championship qualification tournament. She was later named to the squad for the official tournament, where she won the gold medal with the team, scoring one of the goals in a 3–2 victory over Mexico U20 in the final.

== Honours ==
Canada

- CONCACAF Women's U-20 Championship: 2025
