= Lisa Pechersky =

Canadian soccer player (born 1998)

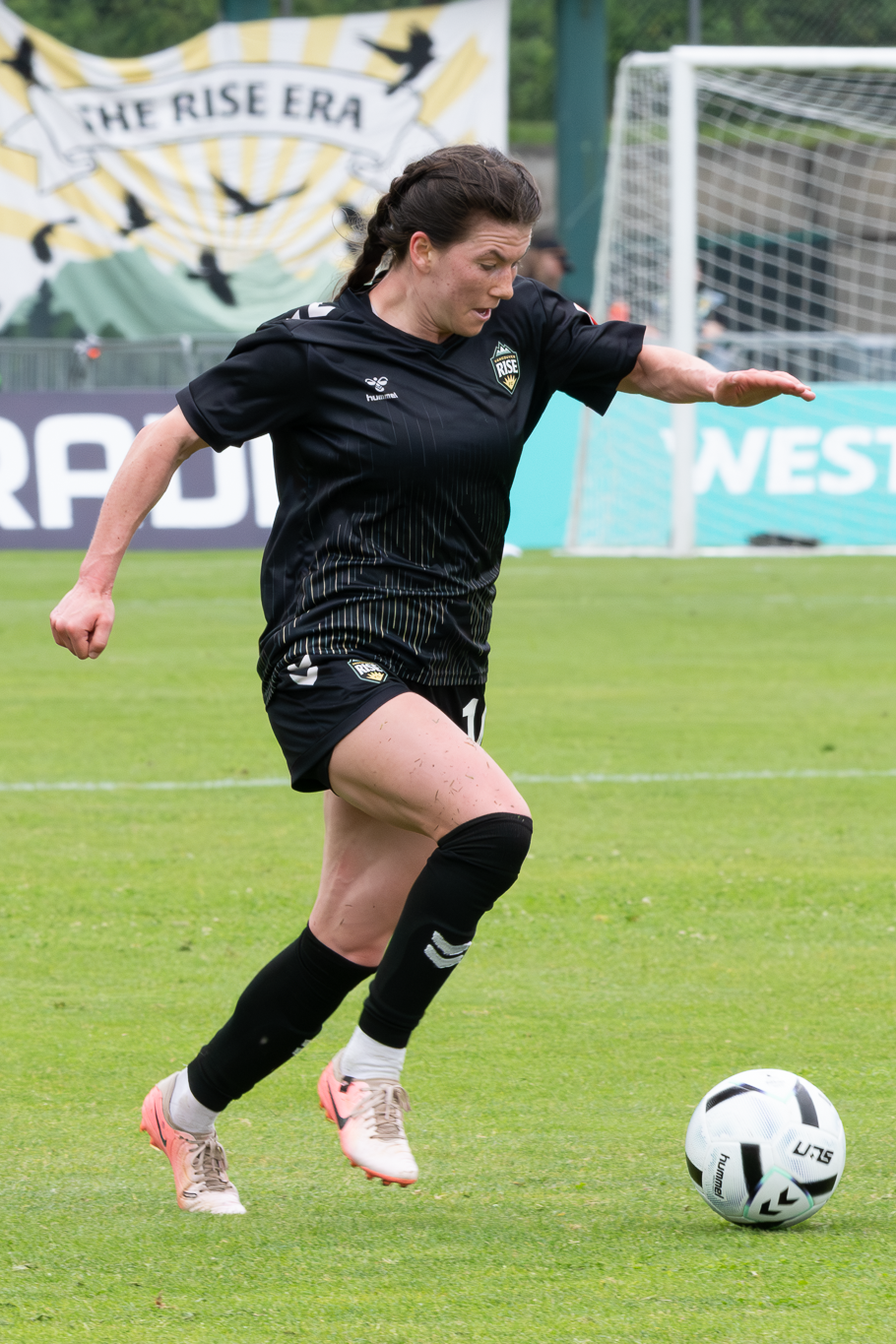
- Pechersky playing for Vancouver Rise FC in 2025

Personal information
- Full name: Elizabeth Pechersky
- Date of birth: June 29, 1998 (age 28)
- Place of birth: Toronto, Ontario, Canada
- Height: 5 ft 3 in (1.60 m)
- Position: Midfielder

Team information
- Current team: Montreal Roses FC
- Number: 10

Youth career
- North Mississauga SC
- Woodbridge Strikers

College career
Years	Team	Apps	(Gls)
2016–2021	Memphis Tigers	64	(6)

Senior career*
Years	Team	Apps	(Gls)
2016	Woodbridge Strikers	8	(7)
2018–2019	Woodbridge Strikers	6	(1)
2021	Lidköpings FK	10	(4)
2022	KIF Örebro DFF	15	(2)
2023	PSV	3	(0)
2023	Vålerenga	12	(0)
2024	Vittsjö GIK	5	(0)
2025	Vancouver Rise FC	24	(4)
2026–	Montreal Roses FC	0	(0)
- * Club domestic league appearances and goals as of October 17, 2025

Elizabeth "Lisa" Pechersky (born June 29, 1998) is a Canadian soccer player who plays for Montreal Roses FC in the Northern Super League.

== Early life ==
Pechersky played youth soccer with North Mississauga SC and the Woodbridge Strikers. She also played with the Ontario provincial team from U14 to U16 level and won a gold medal at the Canadian National Championships with Team Ontario.

== College career ==
In 2016, Pechersky began attending the University of Memphis, where she played for the women's soccer team. In 2017, she redshirted the season, extending her eligibility another season. On October 31, 2019, she scored her first collegiate goal in a victory over the Tulsa Golden Hurricane. At the end of the 2021 Spring season (delayed from the 2020 Fall due to the COVID-19 pandemic), she was named to the All-American Athletic Conference Second Team. She was named to the AAC All-Academic team four times from 2017 to 2020.

== Club career ==
In 2016, Pechersky played with the Woodbridge Strikers in League1 Ontario (women). She returned to play with them in 2018 and 2019.

In July 2021, she signed with Lidköpings FK in the Swedish second tier Elitettan.

In December 2021, she signed with Swedish club KIF Örebro DFF in the first tier Damallsvenskan on a two-year contract to begin in the 2022 season. At the end of the 2022 season, she agreed to a mutual termination of the remainder of her contract.

In January 2023, Pechersky signed with PSV in the Dutch Eredivisie on a free transfer, until the end of June 2023. At the end of March 2023, she left the club on a transfer for the second-highest fee in team history.

At the end of March 2023, she signed with Norwegian Toppserien club Vålerenga.

In August 2024, she signed with Swedish Damallsvenskan club Vittsjö GIK.

In February 2025, she returned to her native Canada and signed with Northern Super League club Vancouver Rise FC. She started in the league's inaugural match on April 16, 2025, a 1-0 win over Calgary Wild FC. On May 22, 2025, she scored her first goal in a 2-1 victory over Halifax Tides FC.

In January 2026, she signed with fellow Northern Super League club Montreal Roses FC.
