= Altitude FC (Canada) =

Semi-professional soccer club

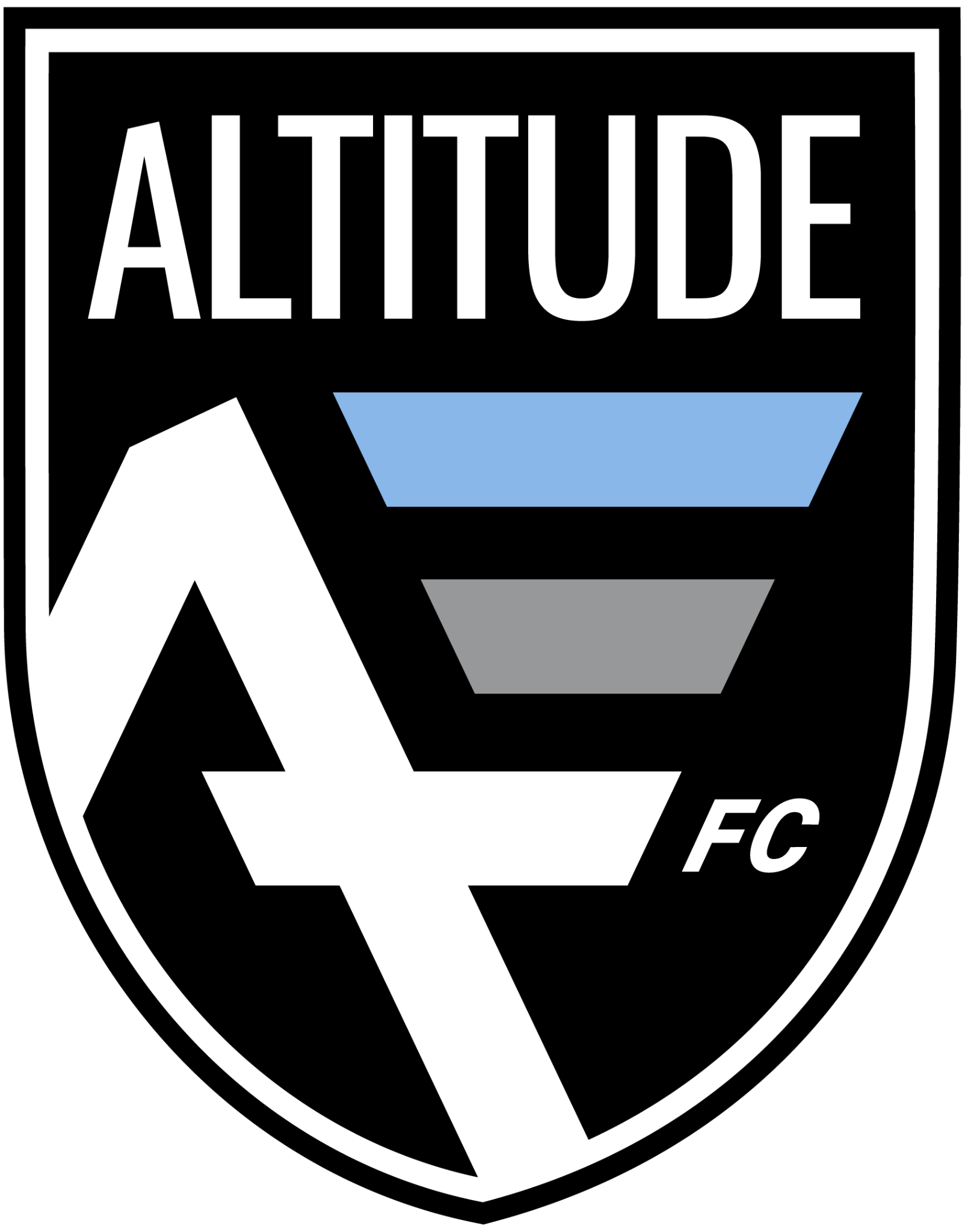
- Full name: Altitude FC
- Founded: 2021
- Stadium: Kinsmen Park
- Head Coach: Faly Basse (men); Jesse Symons (women)
- League: British Columbia Premier League
- 2025: L1BC, 3rd (men); L1BC, 1st (women)
- Website: https://www.altitudefc.ca/
Home colours	Away colours

Altitude FC is a Canadian semi-professional soccer club based in North Vancouver, British Columbia that plays in the British Columbia Premier League.

== History ==
The club was officially unveiled on November 15, 2021, as an inaugural licence holder for the first season of the new semi-professional League1 British Columbia in 2022. The founders began working on forming the club in 2020, when BC Soccer issued an RFP for interested clubs. Located in the city of North Vancouver, the club plans to represent the entire North Shore region, as well as the Sea-to-Sky Corridor. The group was formed by Faly Academy and a group of local investors and is set to play out of Kinsmen Stadium. The club intends to work alongside local youth clubs, such as North Van FC, West Van FC, and the North Shore Girls SC, rather than to try to compete with them for players, who can move to Altitude as part of the player pathway. Initially the club had planned to name the club North Shore United, re-appropriating and paying homage to the name of a former club who had been national champions in 1936, however, the league's prior branding planning won out, with the club taking on the Altitude FC name. The club's jerseys have been inspired by the North Shore's mountainous nature, referencing the club's name. The club has also partnered with various non-profits to raise funds to support them during game-day experiences.

Their inaugural matches, for both the male and female teams, occurred on May 22 against Rivers FC, with the men drawing 1-1 and the women being defeated 2-0. Their first home matches occurred on May 29 against the Vancouver Whitecaps Academy, in front of a sold-out crowd featuring over 700 fans in attendance with an additional 200 people standing outside of the fenced venue. They formed a rivalry with TSS FC Rovers called the Ironworkers Memorial Derby.

In 2025, the women's team won their division, qualifying for the Women's Inter-Provincial Championship, featuring the champions of each of the League1 Canada divisions.

== Seasons ==
=== Men ===
Season	League	Teams	Record	Rank	Playoffs	Juan de Fuca Plate	Ref
2022	League1 British Columbia	7	4–2–6	4th	did not qualify	6th (Note: The Juan de Fuca Plate is a combined men's and women's competition that combines both squads results)	
2023	League1 British Columbia	8	2–3–9	7th	did not qualify	6th	
2024	League1 British Columbia	7	6–3–3	2nd	Finalists	4th	
2025	League1 British Columbia	9	7–6–3	3rd	–	Champions	

=== Women ===
Season	League	Teams	Record	Rank	Playoffs	Inter-provincial Championship	Juan de Fuca Plate	Ref
2022	League1 British Columbia	7	1–2–9	6th	did not qualify	did not qualify	6th (Note: The Juan de Fuca Plate is a combined men's and women's competition that combines both squads results)	
2023	League1 British Columbia	8	4–5–5	6th	did not qualify	did not qualify	6th	
2024	League1 British Columbia	7	2–4–6	5th	did not qualify	did not qualify	4th	
2025	League1 British Columbia	9	14–1–1	Champions	–	4th	Champions	

== Notable players ==
The following players have either played at the professional or international level, either before or after playing for the League1 BC team:

Men

- (Canada) Carson Buschman-Dormond
- (Canada) Caleb Clarke
- (Canada) Henri Godbout
- (Guinea) Sacko Konate
- (Barbados) Nathan Walters-Harewood

Women

- (Canada) Kayla Gonçalves
- (Canada) Sienna Gibson
- (Jamaica) (Canada) Jade Mitchell
- (Panama) Yvamara Rodríguez
