= Samantha Chang (soccer) =

Canadian soccer player (born 2000)

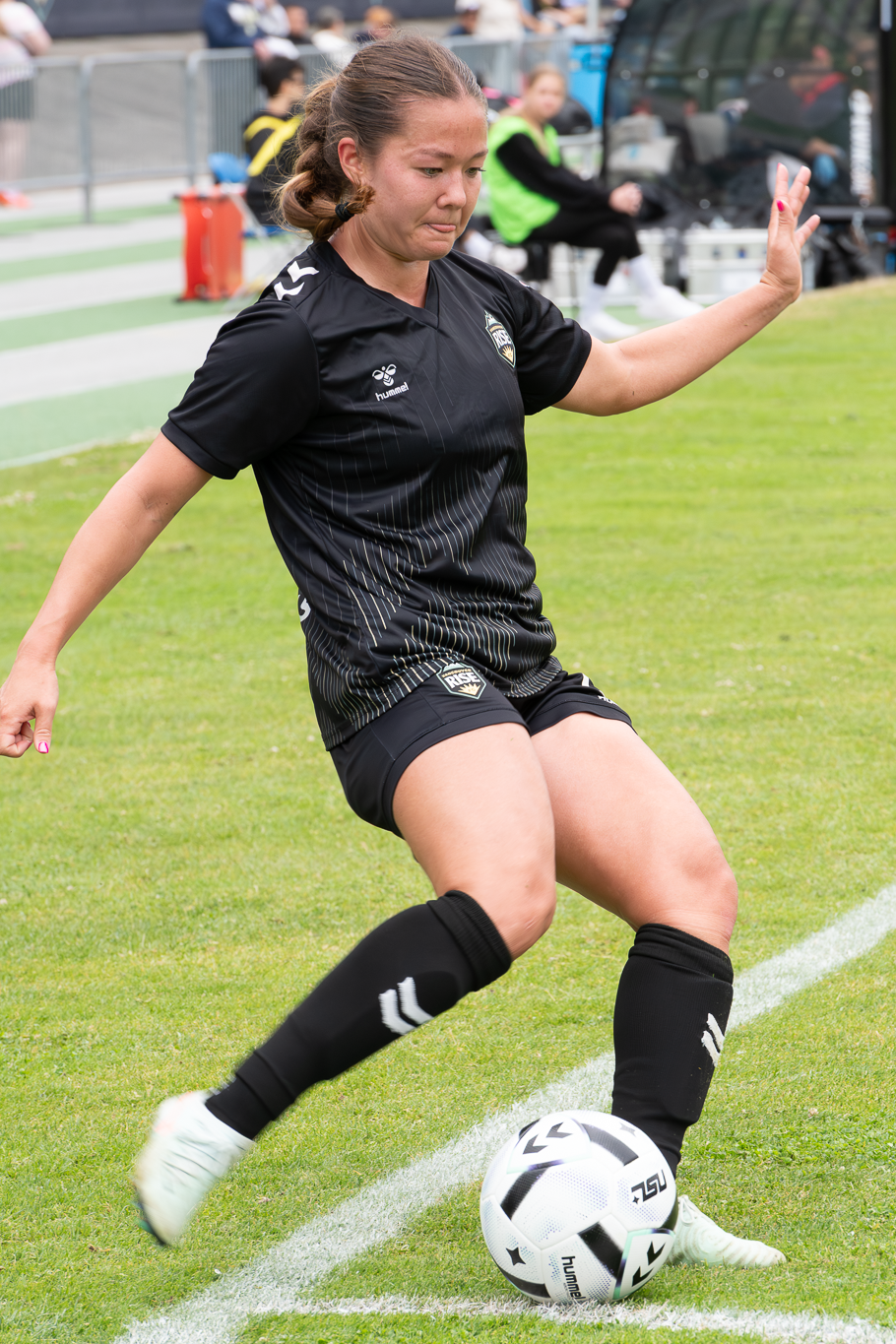
- Chang playing for Vancouver Rise FC in 2025

Personal information
- Full name: Samantha Susan Chang
- Date of birth: July 13, 2000 (age 26)
- Place of birth: Mississauga, Ontario, Canada
- Height: 5 ft 5 in (1.65 m)
- Position: Midfielder

Team information
- Current team: AFC Toronto

Youth career
- Mississauga SC
- Brampton Brams United
- Unionville Milliken SC

College career
Years	Team	Apps	(Gls)
2018–2022	South Carolina Gamecocks	83	(9)

Senior career*
Years	Team	Apps	(Gls)
2017	Unionville Milliken SC	11	(4)
2019	Unionville Milliken SC	6	(1)
2022	Unionville Milliken SC	3	(2)
2023	Torreense	9	(1)
2023–2024	HB Køge	35	(3)
2025	Vancouver Rise FC	23	(4)
2026–	AFC Toronto	0	(0)

International career^{‡}
2014	Canada U15	6	(0)
2016	Canada U17	5	(0)
2020	Canada U20	3	(0)
2021–	Canada	3	(0)
- * Club domestic league appearances and goals as of 17 October 2025 ‡ National team caps and goals as of February 25, 2025

Samantha Susan Chang (born July 13, 2000) is a Canadian soccer player who plays as a midfielder for AFC Toronto in the Northern Super League.

== Early life ==
Chang was born in Mississauga, Ontario, to a South Korean father and a Canadian mother and began playing soccer with the Mississauga Soccer Club at the age of 3, before eventually moving on to playing with Brams United of Brampton and then Unionville Milliken SC.

== College career ==
In 2018, she signed a scholarship to play for the University of South Carolina's women's soccer team. She missed her freshman season in 2018, due to injury. She made her debut on August 22, 2019, recording two assists in a 2–1 victory over the NC State Wolfpack. She scored her first goal six days later against the Jacksonville Dolphins. She scored her first NCAA Tournament goal, which was also her first game-winning goal on November 16 against the Samford Bulldogs. In her debut season in 2019, she appeared in 23 games and was named to the SEC All-Freshman Team. After a gamewinning goal performance against the Arkansas Razorbacks in 2020, she earned SEC and National Player of the Week honours. She won the SEC title with South Carolina in her senior season, being named to the All-Tournament team.

== Club career ==
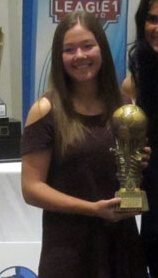
Chang receives L1O Young Player of the Year award in 2017

In 2017, she began playing for Unionville Milliken's first team in League1 Ontario at age 16, serving as team captain, despite being on a roster with players as old as 25 with NCAA Division I experience. She was named the league's Young Player of the Year and a league First Team All-Star. She returned to UMSC in 2019, scoring once in six appearances. She returned to the side in 2022, scoring twice in her season debut against Simcoe County Rovers.

In February 2023, she joined Portuguese club Torreense in the Campeonato Nacional de Futebol Feminino. She scored her first goal in her debut on February 4 against Länk Vilaverdense.

In July 2023, she signed with Danish club HB Køge. She made her debut on August 26, scoring her first goal as well, in a league match against FC Thy-Thisted Q.

In January 2025, she signed with Northern Super League club Vancouver Rise FC on a transfer for an undisclosed fee. On July 24, 2025, she scored her first goals, netting both goals in a 2–1 victory over AFC Toronto. Following the 2025 season, in which she won the NSL title and served as team captain for the second half of the season, she departed the club.

In January 2026, she signed with AFC Toronto in the Northern Super League. On March 24, 2026, it was announced that she suffered had an ACL injury during pre-season camp and that she would be undergoing surgery in Toronto, causing her to miss the entire 2026 season.

== International career ==
Chang has represented Canada at the 2014 CONCACAF Girls' U-15 Championship, scoring the winning penalty kick as Canada won the gold medal and was named to the tournament Best XI. She also represented Canada at the 2016 CONCACAF Women's U-17 Championship, 2016 FIFA U-17 Women's World Cup and 2020 CONCACAF Women's U-20 Championship.

She was named to the Canadian senior squad for the first time in 2021 for the 2021 SheBelieves Cup, making her debut on February 21 against Argentina.

== Career statistics ==
As of November 10, 2025

Club	Season	League			Playoffs		Domestic Cup		League Cup		Continental		Total	
Club	Season	Division	Apps	Goals	Apps	Goals	Apps	Goals	Apps	Goals	Apps	Goals	Apps	Goals
Unionville Milliken SC	2017	League1 Ontario	11	4	—		—		1	1	—		12	5
Unionville Milliken SC	2019	League1 Ontario	6	1	—		—		—		—		6	1
Unionville Milliken SC	2022	League1 Ontario	3	2	—		—		—		—		3	2
Unionville Milliken SC	Total		20	7	0	0	0	0	1	1	0	0	21	8
Torreense	2022–23	Campeonato Nacional Feminino	9	1	—		0	0	0	0	—		9	1
HB Køge	2023–24	A-Liga	21	1	—		1	0	—		1	0	23	1
HB Køge	2024–25	A-Liga	14	2	—		2	0	—		—		16	2
HB Køge	Total		35	3	0	0	3	0	0	0	1	0	39	3
Vancouver Rise FC	2025	Northern Super League	23	4	3	0	—		—		—		26	4
Career total			87	15	3	0	3	0	1	1	1	0	95	16
