= F.C. Famalicão (women) =

Association football club

Famalicão
- Full name: Futebol Clube de Famalicão
- Nickname(s): Famalicenses; Vila Nova; Azuis e Brancos; Fama
- Founded: 28 May 2019; 6 years ago
- Ground: Academia do F.C. Famalicão; Vila Nova de Famalicão
- Capacity: 500
- Manager: Jorge Barcellos
- League: Campeonato Nacional Feminino
- 2023–24: Campeonato Nacional Feminino, 10th of 8
- Website: www.fcfamalicao.pt
| Home colours | Away colours | Third colours |

Futebol Clube de Famalicão, commonly known as Famalicão, is a women's football club from Vila Nova de Famalicão, in Braga District, Portugal. The team, a section of F.C. Famalicão, was founded in 2019 and promoted to the top tier Campeonato Nacional Feminino in 2020. The women's team plays home games at the club's 500-capacity Academia do F.C. Famalicão training facility.

The sale of Mylena Freitas to Shanghai Shengli in May 2021 for €50,000 represented a Portuguese national record transfer fee for a female player. In July 2021 the club appointed former Brazil women's national football team coach Jorge Barcellos.

== Players ==
=== Current squad ===
As of 24 August 2024

Note: Flags indicate national team as defined under FIFA eligibility rules; some limited exceptions apply. Players may hold more than one non-FIFA nationality.

| No. | Pos. | Nation | Player |
|---|---|---|---|
| 1 | GK | (Portugal) POR | Daniela Araújo |
| 3 | DF | (Argentina) ARG | Eugenia Nardone |
| 5 | DF | (Portugal) POR | Sofia Almeida |
| 6 | DF | (Portugal) POR | Cláudia Machado |
| 8 | MF | (Portugal) POR | Mafalda Nunes |
| 9 | MF | (Portugal) POR | Maria André |
| 10 | FW | (Portugal) POR | Rita Dias |
| 11 | MF | (Switzerland) SUI | Sabina Di Muro |
| 12 | MF | (Canada) CAN | Kayla Gonçalves |
| 16 | DF | (Portugal) POR | Diana Gomes |
| 17 | DF | (Portugal) POR | Mariana Simães |
| 18 | DF | (Portugal) POR | Joana Ribeiro |

| No. | Pos. | Nation | Player |
|---|---|---|---|
| 20 | DF | (Portugal) POR | Matilde Borges |
| 21 | FW | (Cape Verde) CPV | Leonilde Rodrigues |
| 22 | FW | (Portugal) POR | Eva Sampaio |
| 23 | MF | (Portugal) POR | Rita Lang |
| 27 | FW | (Brazil) BRA | Victoria Pereira |
| 30 | FW | (Equatorial Guinea) EQG | Diana Meriva |
| 50 | FW | (Cape Verde) CPV | Kleydiana Borges |
| 99 | GK | (Portugal) POR | Mariana Lima |
| — | GK | (Portugal) POR | Letícia Cruzeiro |
| — | DF | (Mexico) MEX | Paulina Solís |
| — | MF | (Portugal) POR | Sara Coutinho |
| — | FW | (Brazil) BRA | Karol Cardozo |

== Honours ==
- Taça de Portugal

Winners (1): 2022–23
