= Sara Lilja Vidlund =

Swedish footballer

Personal information
- Full name: Sara Charlotte Lilja Vidlund
- Date of birth: September 12, 2001 (age 25)
- Place of birth: Karlskoga, Sweden
- Height: 1.73 m (5 ft 8 in)
- Position: Forward

Youth career
- Immetorps BK
- Bråtens IK
- Rävåsens IK

Senior career*
Years	Team	Apps	(Gls)
2015–2016	Bråtens IK	10	(9)
2016–2017	Rävåsens IK	28	(9)
2017	Rävåsens IK 2	1	(0)
2018–2021	KIF Örebro DFF	66	(3)
2018–2019	→ Rävåsens IK (loan)	21	(6)
2022–2024	Djurgårdens IF	37	(1)
2025	Vancouver Rise FC	1	(0)

International career
2016	Sweden U15	2	(0)
2017	Sweden U16	9	(4)
2018	Sweden U17	3	(0)
2019	Sweden U18	6	(2)
2020	Sweden U19	4	(1)
- * Club domestic league appearances and goals as of April 16, 2025

Sara Charlotte Lilja Vidlund (born September 12, 2001) is a Swedish footballer.

== Early life ==
Vidlund played youth football with Immetorps BK, Bråtens IK, and Rävåsens IK.

== Club career ==
Vidlund made her senior debut at age 12 with Bråtens IK in the sixth tier Division 4.

At age 14, she moved to Rävåsens IK in the third tier Division 1.

In November 2017, she signed with KIF Örebro DFF in the second tier Elitettan for the 2018 season. While with Örebro, she also continued to play with her previous club Rävåsens IK on occasion. In November 2019, she signed a two-year extension. After helping the team earn promotion, on April 22, 2019, she scored her first goal in the first tier Damallsvenskan in a match against IF Limhamn Bunkeflo. On 7 October 2020, she scored four goals in a 5-1 Svenska Cupen victory over Västerås BK30. On 21 October 2021, she scored a hat trick in the district cup final in an 11–1 victory over Örebro SK. After the 2021 season, she departed the club.

In January 2022, she signed with Djurgårdens IF. In September 2023, she suffered a cruciate ligament injury, causing her to miss an extended period of time. After the 2024 season, she departed the club.

In February 2025, she signed with Canadian Northern Super League club Vancouver Rise FC.

== International career ==
In October 2017, she scored a hat trick for the Sweden U16 against Croatia U16 during the 2018 UEFA Women's Under-17 Championship qualification, which were her first goals at international level. In January 2020, Vidlund was called up to the Sweden U19. In September 2020, she was called up to the Sweden U23.
