= Kayla Gonçalves =

Canadian soccer player (born 2000)

Personal information
- Full name: Kayla Nicole Azevedo Gonçalves
- Date of birth: April 14, 2000 (age 26)
- Place of birth: Toronto, Ontario, Canada
- Height: 5 ft 4 in (1.63 m)
- Position: Defender

Team information
- Current team: Wexford
- Number: 8

Youth career
- Glen Shields SC
- Unionville Milliken SC

College career
Years	Team	Apps	(Gls)
2018–2021	Simon Fraser Red Leafs	46	(2)

Senior career*
Years	Team	Apps	(Gls)
2017–2019	Unionville Milliken SC	29	(2)
2022	Unionville Milliken SC	6	(0)
2022	Altitude FC		
2022–2023	CA Paris 14		
2023–2024	FC Swift Hesperange		
2024–2025	Famalicão	9	(0)
2025	Vancouver Rise FC	2	(0)
2025	→ Vancouver Rise FC Academy	0	(0)
2026–	Wexford	6	(0)
- * Club domestic league appearances and goals as of September 5, 2025

Kayla Nicole Azevedo Gonçalves (born April 14, 2000) is a Canadian soccer player who plays for Irish Club Wexford.

== Early life ==
Gonçalves played youth soccer with Glen Shields SC.

== College career ==
In 2018, Gonçalves began attending Simon Fraser University. On August 30, 2018, she scored her first goal in the season opener in a 6-1 victory over the Minnesota State–Moorhead Dragons. On September 4, 2021, she scored her second career goal in a 1-1 draw against the MSU Denver Roadrunners.

== Club career ==
From 2017 to 2019, Gonçalves played with Unionville Milliken SC in League1 Ontario. She again played for the side in 2022.

In the summer of 2022, she joined Altitude FC in League1 British Columbia.

In August 2022, she signed with French Division 2 Féminine club CA Paris 14.

In August 2023, she joined FC Swift Hesperange in Luxembourg.

In August 2024, she signed with Portuguese club Famalicão in the Campeonato Nacional Feminino.

In January 2025, she signed with Canadian Northern Super League club Vancouver Rise FC. In September 2025, she joined the Vancouver Rise FC Academy for the 2025–26 CONCACAF W Champions Cup.
