= Women's Inter-Provincial Championship =

Canadian soccer competition

- Organiser(s): Premier Soccer Leagues Canada
- Founded: 2022
- Abolished: 2025
- Region: Canada
- Teams: 4
- Qualifier for: CONCACAF W Champions Cup
- Last champions: Simcoe County Rovers FC (1st title)
- Most championships: Vancouver Rise FC Academy (2 titles)

The Women's Inter-Provincial Championship was an annual soccer tournament organized by Premier Soccer Leagues Canada. Established in 2022, it was contested by the champions of each of the PSL Canada member leagues. The winner was considered to be the semi-pro national champion and qualified to the CONCACAF W Champions Cup from 2023 to 2025, after which it was replaced by the W Canadian Championship.

== Format ==
The Inter-Provincial Championship was a four-team knockout tournament played in August, immediately following the regular season. It was played over a single weekend with the semifinals held on Friday and the finals and third-place match on Sunday. The host of the tournament rotates between the member leagues. The winners of each member league (Alberta, British Columbia, Ontario, and Quebec) qualify for the tournament. Prior to the establishment of League1 Alberta in 2024, the host league was granted the fourth berth.

== Results ==
Year	Host	Location(s)	Winner	Runner-up	Third place	Fourth place
2022	Quebec	Laval	(Quebec) A.S. Blainville	(Quebec) AS Laval	(Ontario) Alliance United	(British Columbia) Varsity FC
2023	British Columbia	Langley	(British Columbia) Whitecaps FC Girls Elite	(Quebec) PEF Québec	(British Columbia) Unity FC	(Ontario) Alliance United
2024	Ontario	Hamilton	(British Columbia) Whitecaps FC Girls Elite	(Quebec) CS Mont-Royal Outremont	NDC Ontario	(Alberta) Calgary Blizzard WSC
2025	Alberta	Sherwood Park	(Ontario) Simcoe County Rovers FC	(Quebec) CS Mont-Royal Outremont	(Alberta) Calgary Blizzard WSC	(British Columbia) Altitude FC

=== Performances by province ===
Province	Champions	Runners-up	Third place	Fourth place	Total
British Columbia	2	–	1	2	5
Quebec	1	4	–	–	5
Ontario	1	–	2	1	4
Alberta	–	–	1	1	2

== See also ==
- W Canadian Championship
- Canadian Championship
- Inter-Provincial Cup (soccer)
