= 2025 Northern Super League season =

Women's professional soccer league season

Northern Super League
- Season: 2025
- Dates: April 16 – October 19 (regular season); November 1–15 (playoffs)
- Champions: Vancouver Rise FC (1st title)
- Supporters' Shield: AFC Toronto
- Matches: 75
- Goals: 194 (2.59 per match)
- Top goalscorer: DB Pridham (18 goals)
- Biggest home win: AFC Toronto 7–0 Vancouver Rise (September 13)
- Biggest away win: Halifax Tides 0–6 Vancouver Rise (July 19)
- Highest scoring: AFC Toronto 7–0 Vancouver Rise (September 13)
- Longest winning run: 5 matches AFC Toronto (June 11 – July 15)
- Longest unbeaten run: 8 matches Vancouver Rise (July 19 – September 6)
- Longest winless run: 15 matches Halifax Tides (July 15 – October 15)
- Longest losing run: 5 matches Calgary Wild (August 23 – September 17)
- Highest attendance: 14,518; AFC Toronto 0–1 Montreal Roses (April 19)
- Lowest attendance: 953; Ottawa Rapid 5–0 Halifax Tides (August 28)
- Total attendance: 272,496
- Average attendance: 3,633
- All statistics correct as of October 19, 2025.

The 2025 Northern Super League season was the inaugural season of the Northern Super League, the top level of women's Canadian soccer. The season started on April 16 and concluded with the final on November 15.

Vancouver Rise defeated Toronto in the final 2–1 to win the inaugural title.

== Teams ==
Six clubs participated in the inaugural season.

=== Stadiums and locations ===
Location of the 2025 Northern Super League teams

Team	Results	Location	Stadium	Capacity
Calgary Wild FC	details	Calgary, Alberta	McMahon Stadium	35,400
Halifax Tides FC	details	Halifax, Nova Scotia	Wanderers Grounds	7,500
Montreal Roses FC	details	Laval, Quebec	Centre Sportif Bois-de-Boulogne	5,581
Ottawa Rapid FC	details	Ottawa, Ontario	TD Place Stadium	24,000
AFC Toronto	details	Toronto, Ontario	York Lions Stadium (Note: AFC Toronto also played two home games at BMO Field)	4,000
Vancouver Rise FC	details	Burnaby, British Columbia	Swangard Stadium (Note: Vancouver Rise played their home opener at BC Place in Vancouver)	4,500

=== Personnel and sponsorship ===
Team	Head coach	Captain	Kit manufacturer	Shirt sponsor
Calgary Wild	(England) Lydia Bedford	(United States) Meggie Dougherty Howard	Hummel	None
Halifax Tides	(Trinidad and Tobago) Stephen Hart (interim)	(Iceland) Gunnhildur Yrsa Jónsdóttir	Hummel	IWK Foundation
Montreal Roses	(Romania) Robert Rositoiu	(Ukraine) Tanya Boychuk, (Canada) Mégane Sauvé	Hummel	None
Ottawa Rapid	(Denmark) Katrine Pedersen	(Canada) Desiree Scott	Hummel	None
AFC Toronto	(Canada) Marko Milanović	(Canada) Emma Regan	Hummel	Desjardins
Vancouver Rise	(Denmark) Anja Heiner-Møller	(Canada) Shannon Woeller	Hummel	None

=== Coaching changes ===
Team	Outgoing coach	Manner of departure	Date of vacancy	Position in table	Incoming coach	Date of appointment
Halifax Tides	(Canada) Lewis Page	Reassigned	June 29, 2025	6th	(Trinidad and Tobago) Stephen Hart (interim)	June 30, 2025

== Regular season ==
=== Format ===
Each club played 25 matches during the season, playing each other club five times. The top four clubs advanced to the two-legged semifinals, with the winners advancing to a single championship match on November 15.

=== Standings ===
Pos	Team	Pld	W	D	L	GF	GA	GD	Pts	Qualification
1	AFC Toronto (S)	25	16	3	6	42	24	+18	51	Advance to playoffs
2	Ottawa Rapid	25	11	6	8	41	26	+15	39 (Note: Head-to-head points tied 7–7; head-to-head goal difference: Ottawa Rapid +3, Vancouver Rise –3)	Advance to playoffs
3	Vancouver Rise (C)	25	11	6	8	38	36	+2	39	Advance to playoffs
4	Montreal Roses	25	10	6	9	30	23	+7	36	Advance to playoffs
5	Calgary Wild	25	9	2	14	26	42	−16	29	
6	Halifax Tides	25	3	7	15	17	43	−26	16	

Source: NSL
Rules for classification: 1) Points 2) Head-to-head points; 3) Head-to-head goal difference; 4) Goal difference; 5) Wins; 6) Goals scored; 7) Goals conceded; 8) Least red cards; 9) Least yellow cards; 10) Drawing of lots.
(C) Champion; (S) Supporters' Shield winner

=== Results ===
Home \ Away	CGY	HFX	MTL	OTT	TOR	VAN
Calgary Wild		3–2	1–0	0–0	1–2	2–1
Calgary Wild		1–0	0–5	0–3	1–2	2–1
Calgary Wild		3–1		1–2	1–2	
Halifax Tides	1–4		1–1	2–1	0–1	0–6
Halifax Tides	1–0		2–2	1–1	0–1	0–0
Halifax Tides				1–2	0–1	1–1
Montreal Roses	2–0	0–0		2–1	0–2	2–0
Montreal Roses	2–0	0–1		0–2	1–2	0–1
Montreal Roses	0–2	2–0				
Ottawa Rapid	3–1	1–0	1–1		2–1	3–0
Ottawa Rapid	0–1	5–0	1–2		1–1	2–3
Ottawa Rapid			0–0		0–1	0–2
AFC Toronto	2–1	3–1	0–1	0–4		1–1
AFC Toronto	2–0	1–1	1–2	3–0		0–1
AFC Toronto			2–1			7–0
Vancouver Rise	1–0	1–0	1–3	3–3	2–3	
Vancouver Rise	1–1	2–1	0–0	0–3	2–1	
Vancouver Rise	6–0		2–1			

Source: NSL
Legend: Blue = home team win; Yellow = draw; Red = away team win.

=== Positions by week ===
Team ╲ Week	1	2	3	4	5	6	8	9	10	13	14	15	16	17	18	19	20	21	22	23	24	25	26	27
Calgary Wild	6	2	3	3	3	5	3	4	5	4	5	5	5	5	5	5	5	5	5	5	5	5	5	5
Halifax Tides	3	6	6	6	6	6	6	6	6	6	6	6	6	6	6	6	6	6	6	6	6	6	6	6
Montreal Roses	1	1	1	1	1	1	1	1	2	2	2	2	2	2	3	2	4	4	2	3	3	3	4	4
Ottawa Rapid	4	3	4	4	2	4	2	3	3	3	3	3	3	3	2	4	3	3	4	2	2	2	3	2
AFC Toronto	5	5	5	5	4	3	5	2	1	1	1	1	1	1	1	1	1	1	1	1	1	1	1	1
Vancouver Rise	2	4	2	2	5	2	4	5	4	5	4	4	4	4	4	3	2	2	3	4	4	4	2	3

Source: NSL standings, NSL on Instagram
= Playoffs

== Playoffs ==
In July 2025, it was announced that BMO Field in Toronto would host the final.

=== Bracket ===
Semi-finals
1	AFC Toronto	2	4	6
4	Montreal Roses	0	1	1
2	Ottawa Rapid	1	2	3 (4)
3	Vancouver Rise (p)	2	1	3 (5)

Final
November 15 – Toronto
1	AFC Toronto	1
3	Vancouver Rise	2

=== Semi-finals ===
The first legs were played on November 1 and 4, and the second legs were played on November 8 and 10, 2025.

Team 1	Agg.	Team 2	1st leg	2nd leg
Montreal Roses	1–6	AFC Toronto	0–2	1–4
Vancouver Rise	3–3 (5–4 p)	Ottawa Rapid	2–1	1–2 (a.e.t.)

November 1
12:00 pm EDT

Montreal Roses	0–2	AFC Toronto
	Report	Small 7'; Hunter 70'

Stade Boréale, Laval, Quebec
Attendance: 2,296
Referee: Marie-Soleil Beaudoin
November 10 (Note: The match was postponed by a day due to inclement weather.)
6:00 pm EST

AFC Toronto	4–1	Montreal Roses
Okoronkwo 7', 21', 27'; Rowe 83'	Report	Boychuk 74'

York Lions Stadium, Toronto, Ontario
Referee: Carly Shaw-MacLaren

AFC Toronto won 6–1 on aggregate.

November 4
7:00 pm PST

Vancouver Rise	2–1	Ottawa Rapid
Abdu 14', 21'	Report	Pridham 66'

Swangard Stadium, Burnaby, British Columbia
Attendance: 3,533
Referee: Carly Shaw-MacLaren
November 8
3:00 pm EST

Ottawa Rapid	2–1 (a.e.t.)	Vancouver Rise
Pridham 27'; Forbes 49'	Report	Ward 84'
Penalties
Pridham (penalty scored); Harris (penalty scored); Forbes (penalty scored); Amano (penalty scored); Haaland (penalty missed); Benati (penalty missed)	4–5	(penalty missed) Pechersky; (penalty scored) Stanton; (penalty scored) Sawan; (penalty scored) Lee; (penalty scored) Abdu; (penalty scored) Hagman

TD Place Stadium, Ottawa, Ontario
Attendance: 3,068
Referee: Salma Flores-Desrochers

3–3 on aggregate. Vancouver Rise won 5–4 on penalties.

=== Final ===
November 15
2:00 pm EST

AFC Toronto	1–2	Vancouver Rise
Hunter 20'	Report	Cota-Yarde 54' (o.g.); Ward 68'

BMO Field, Toronto, Ontario
Attendance: 12,429
Referee: Marie-Soleil Beaudoin

== Statistical leaders ==
All stats are for the regular season only, and do not include playoffs

As of October 19, 2025

=== Top scorers ===
Rank	Player	Club	Goals
1	(Canada) DB Pridham	Ottawa Rapid	18
2	(Canada) Kaylee Hunter	AFC Toronto	14
3	(Canada) Latifah Abdu	Montreal Roses / Vancouver Rise	9
4	(Nigeria) Esther Okoronkwo	AFC Toronto	8
5	(Canada) Jessica De Filippo	Vancouver Rise	7
6	(Canada) Tanya Boychuk	Montreal Roses	6
6	(United States) Meggie Dougherty Howard	Calgary Wild	6
6	(Canada) Quinn	Vancouver Rise	6
6	(Canada) Holly Ward	Vancouver Rise	6
10	(Canada) Stéphanie Hill	Montreal Roses	5
10	(United States) Mariah Lee	Vancouver Rise	5
10	(Japan) Megumi Nakamura	Halifax Tides	5
10	(Canada) Nikayla Small	AFC Toronto	5

=== Hat-tricks ===
Player	For	Against	Result	Date	Ref
(Canada) DB Pridham	Ottawa Rapid	AFC Toronto	4–0 (A)	June 7	

=== Top assists ===
Rank	Player	Club	Assists
1	(Nigeria) Esther Okoronkwo	AFC Toronto	7
2	(Canada) Quinn	Vancouver Rise	6
2	(Canada) Nikayla Small	AFC Toronto	6
4	(United States) Melanie Forbes	Ottawa Rapid	5
4	(Canada) Holly Ward	Vancouver Rise	5
5	(Canada) Tanya Boychuk	Montreal Roses	4
5	(Canada) Lisa Pechersky	Vancouver Rise	4
5	(Canada) Victoria Pickett	AFC Toronto	4
9	(Canada) Samantha Chang	Vancouver Rise	3
9	(United States) Meggie Dougherty Howard	Calgary Wild	3
9	(Canada) Kaylee Hunter	AFC Toronto	3
9	(Canada) DB Pridham	Ottawa Rapid	3

=== Clean sheets ===
Rank	Player	Club	Clean sheets
1	(Canada) Morgan McAslan	Vancouver Rise	9
2	(Canada) Melissa Dagenais	Ottawa Rapid	7
3	(Portugal) Sierra Cota-Yarde	AFC Toronto	6
3	(Canada) Anna Karpenko	Montreal Roses	6
5	(Croatia) Stephanie Bukovec	Calgary Wild	5

== Attendance ==
As of October 27, 2025

Pos	Team	Pld	Total	High	Low	Median	Average	Change
1	Vancouver Rise	12	50,936	14,018	1,900	3,877.5	4,245	n/a
2	AFC Toronto	12	48,699	14,518	1,319	2,849	4,058	n/a
3	Halifax Tides	13	50,900	5,508	2,891	3,872	3,915	n/a
4	Calgary Wild	13	43,761	8,552	1,803	2,942	3,366	n/a
5	Montreal Roses	12	38,649	5,049	2,100	2,987.5	3,221	n/a
6	Ottawa Rapid	13	39,551	6,980	953	2,887	3,042	n/a
	League total	75	272,496	14,518	953	3,053	3,633	n/a

Source: NSL

== Awards ==
=== Northern Super League Awards ===
Award	Recipient	Ref
Golden Boot	(Canada) Delaney Baie Pridham (Ottawa)	
Golden Glove	(Canada) Morgan McAslan (Vancouver)	
Assist Leader	(Nigeria) Esther Okoronkwo (Toronto)	
Rookie of the Year	(Canada) Kaylee Hunter (Toronto)	
Goalkeeper of the Year	(Slovakia) Anika Tóth (Halifax)	
Defender of the Year	(United States) Jyllissa Harris (Ottawa)	
Midfielder of the Year	(Canada) Emma Regan (Toronto)	
Forward of the Year	(Canada) Delaney Baie Pridham (Ottawa)	
Player of the Year	(Canada) Delaney Baie Pridham (Ottawa)	
Coach of the Year	(Canada) Marko Milanović (Toronto)	
Goal of the Season	(Canada) Julia Benati (Ottawa)	
NSL Final MVP	(Canada) Morgan McAslan (Vancouver)	

=== Team of the Season ===
The Team of the Season was voted by the players.

Goalkeeper	Defenders	Midfielders	Forwards	Ref
(Slovakia) Anika Tóth (Halifax)	(United States) Colby Barnett (Toronto); (United States) Jyllissa Harris (Ottawa); (Canada) Stéphanie Hill (Montreal); (Canada) Olivia Scott (Ottawa)	(United States) Meggie Dougherty Howard (Calgary); (South Korea) Lee Min-a (Ottawa); (Canada) Emma Regan (Toronto)	(Canada) Kaylee Hunter (Toronto); (Nigeria) Esther Okoronkwo (Toronto); (Canada) Delaney Baie Pridham (Ottawa)	

=== Monthly Awards ===
Player of the Month
Month	Player	Ref
July	(Canada) Kaylee Hunter (Toronto)	
August	(Canada) Delaney Baie Pridham (Ottawa)	
September	(Canada) Quinn (Vancouver)	
October	(United States) Meggie Dougherty Howard (Calgary)	

Intact Impact Award
Month	Player	Ref
July	(Canada) Shannon Woeller (Vancouver)	
August	(Canada) Sarah Keilty-Dilling (Calgary)	
October	(Norway) Susanne Haaland (Ottawa)	
November	(United States) Jasmyne Spencer (Vancouver)	
December	(Canada) Marika Guay (Ottawa)	

Drive of the Month
Month	Player	Ref
May	(United States) Colby Barnett (Toronto)	
June	(Iceland) Gunnhildur Yrsa Jónsdóttir (Halifax)	
July	(Canada) Latifah Abdu (Montreal)	

=== Weekly Awards ===
Stars of the Week
Week	First Star	Second Star	Third Star	Ref
1	(Canada) Anna Karpenko (Montreal)	(Canada) Holly Ward (Vancouver)	(United States) Meggie Dougherty Howard (Calgary)	
2	(Australia) Kahli Johnson (Calgary)	(Canada) Desiree Scott (Ottawa)	(Canada) Latifah Abdu (Montreal)	
3	(Canada) Quinn (Vancouver)	(Canada) Tanya Boychuk (Montreal)	(New Zealand) Meikayla Moore (Calgary)	
4	(Canada) Grace Stordy (Calgary)	(Canada) Kaylee Hunter (Toronto)	(United States) Kiley Norkus (Halifax)	
5	(United States) Delaney Baie Pridham (Ottawa)	(Canada) Nikayla Small (Toronto)	(Philippines) Jaclyn Sawicki (Calgary)	
6	(Australia) Kahli Johnson (Calgary)	(Canada) Emma Regan (Toronto)	(United States) Jyllissa Harris (Ottawa)	
8	(France) Charlotte Bilbault (Montreal)	(United States) Delaney Baie Pridham (Ottawa)	(New Zealand) Ally Green (Calgary)	
9	(Canada) Nikayla Small (Toronto)	(Canada) Tanya Boychuk (Montreal)	(Canada) Grace Stordy (Calgary)	
10	(Canada) Kaylee Hunter (Toronto)	(Canada) Lisa Pechersky (Vancouver)	(Canada) Nicola Golen (Ottawa)	
13	(Canada) Kaylee Hunter (Toronto)	(United States) Meggie Dougherty Howard (Calgary)	(Slovakia) Anika Tóth (Halifax)	
14	(Canada) Holly Ward (Vancouver)	(Japan) Megumi Nakamura (Halifax)	(Slovakia) Anika Tóth (Halifax)	
15	(Canada) Florence Belzile (Ottawa)	(Canada) Latifah Abdu (Montreal)	(Canada) Samantha Chang (Vancouver)	
16	(Jamaica) Tiffany Cameron (Halifax)	(United States) Delaney Baie Pridham (Ottawa)	(Canada) Holly Ward (Vancouver)	
17	(Canada) Kaylee Hunter (Toronto)	(Canada) Claire Monyard (Montreal)	(France) Éva Frémaux (Halifax)	
18	(Canada) Jessica De Filippo (Vancouver)	(United States) Delaney Baie Pridham (Ottawa)	(Canada) Kathryn Harvey (Calgary)	
19	(South Korea) Kang Chae-rim (Montreal)	(Canada) Jessica De Filippo (Vancouver)	(United States) Delaney Baie Pridham (Ottawa)	
20	(Canada) Lisa Pechersky (Vancouver)	(Canada) Zoe Burns (Toronto)	(Canada) Olivia Scott (Ottawa)	
21	(Canada) Quinn (Vancouver)	(Canada) Melissa Dagenais (Ottawa)	(United States) Hailey Whitaker (Montreal)	
22	(Nigeria) Esther Okoronkwo (Toronto)	(Canada) Tanya Boychuk (Montreal)	(United States) Meggie Dougherty Howard (Calgary)	
23	(Canada) Delaney Baie Pridham (Ottawa)	(South Korea) Kang Chae-rim (Montreal)	(Canada) Emma Regan (Toronto)	
24	(Slovakia) Anika Tóth (Halifax)	(United States) Alexandria Hess (Montreal)	(Canada) Lisa Pechersky (Vancouver)	
25	(Canada) Saorla Miller (Halifax)	(Canada) Kaylee Hunter (Toronto)	(United States) Jorian Baucom (Calgary)	
26	(Canada) Jessica De Filippo (Vancouver)	(United States) Meggie Dougherty Howard (Calgary)	(New Zealand) Milly Clegg (Halifax)	
27	(United States) Meggie Dougherty Howard (Calgary)	(United States) Alexandria Hess (Montreal)	(Canada) Nikayla Small (Toronto)	

Rookie of the Week
Week	Rookie of the Week	Ref
1	(Canada) Kaylee Hunter (Toronto)	
2	(Canada) Kaylee Hunter (Toronto)	
3	(Canada) Holly Ward (Vancouver)	
4	(Canada) Stella Downing (Ottawa)	
5	(Canada) Sarah Rollins (Toronto)	
6	(Canada) Emily Wong (Vancouver)	
8	(Canada) Olivia Scott (Ottawa)	
9	(Canada) Kaylee Hunter (Toronto)	
10	(Canada) Stella Downing (Ottawa)	
13	(Canada) Kaylee Hunter (Toronto)	
14	(Canada) Lauren Rowe (Toronto)	
15	(Canada) Félicia Roy (Montreal)	
16	(Canada) Serita Thurton (Calgary)	
17	(Canada) Nikayla Small (Toronto)	
18	(United States) Colby Barnett (Toronto)	
19	(Canada) Holly Ward (Vancouver)	
20	(Canada) Holly Ward (Vancouver)	
21	(Canada) Holly Ward (Vancouver)	
22	(Canada) Kaylee Hunter (Toronto)	
23	(Canada) Noémi Paquin (Montreal)	
24	(Canada) Kaylee Hunter (Toronto)	
25	(Saint Kitts and Nevis) Cloey Uddenberg (Toronto)	
26	(Canada) Sydney Kennedy (Halifax)	
27	(Canada) Lauren Rowe (Toronto)	

Goal of the Week
Week	Goal(s) of the Week	Ref
1	(Canada) Quinn (Vancouver)	
2	(Canada) Latifah Abdu (Montreal)	
3	(Nigeria) Esther Okoronkwo (Toronto)	
4	(Canada) Stella Downing (Ottawa)	
5	(Canada) Julia Benati (Ottawa); (Canada) Jenaya Robertson (Calgary)	
6	(Nigeria) Esther Okoronkwo (Toronto)	
8	(New Zealand) Ally Green (Calgary)	
9	(Iceland) Gunny Jónsdóttir (Halifax)	
10	(Canada) Kaylee Hunter (Toronto)	
13	(United States) Meggie Dougherty Howard (Calgary)	
14	(Canada) Mégane Sauvé (Montreal)	
15	(Canada) Tanya Boychuk (Montreal)	
16	(Canada) Quinn (Vancouver)	
17	(Canada) Kaylee Hunter (Toronto)	
18	(Canada) Jessica De Filippo (Vancouver)	
19	(South Korea) Kang Chae-rim (Montreal)	
20	(Canada) Lisa Pechersky (Vancouver)	
21	(Canada) Jessica De Filippo (Vancouver)	
22	(Nigeria) Esther Okoronkwo (Toronto)	
23	(Canada) Jazmine Wilkinson (Ottawa)	
24	(New Zealand) Milly Clegg (Halifax)	
25	(Canada) Kaylee Hunter (Toronto)	
26	(Canada) Sydney Kennedy (Halifax)	
27	(Norway) Johanne Fridlund (Ottawa)	

Move of the Week
Week	Move(s) of the Week	Ref
1	(Canada) Holly Ward (Vancouver)	
2	(South Korea) Lee Min-a (Ottawa)	
3	(Canada) Quinn (Vancouver); (Egypt) Nedya Sawan (Vancouver); (United States) Hailey Whitaker (Montreal)	
4	(Canada) Kaylee Hunter (Toronto)	
5	(Canada) Serita Thurton (Calgary)	
6	(United States) Hailey Whitaker (Montreal)	
8	(Canada) Kaylee Hunter (Toronto)	
9	(United States) Delaney Baie Pridham (Ottawa)	
10	(Canada) Kaylee Hunter (Toronto)	
13	(Canada) Nikayla Small (Toronto)	
14	(Japan) Megumi Nakamura (Halifax)	
15	(Canada) Lisa Pechersky (Vancouver)	
16	(Jamaica) Tiffany Cameron (Halifax)	
17	(Canada) Stella Downing (Ottawa)	
18	(United States) Croix Soto (Toronto)	
19	(Canada) Nicola Golen (Ottawa); (Canada) Lisa Pechersky (Vancouver)	
20	Ottawa Rapid	
21	(Canada) Félicia Roy (Montreal)	
22	(Nigeria) Esther Okoronkwo (Toronto)	
23	(Canada) Quinn (Vancouver)	
24	(United States) Colby Barnett (Toronto)	
25	(Canada) Mégane Sauvé (Montreal); (South Korea) Kang Chae-rim (Montreal	
26	(New Zealand) Milly Clegg (Halifax)	
27	(Nigeria) Esther Okoronkwo (Toronto); (Canada) Julia Benati (Ottawa)	

Save of the Week
Week	Save(s) of the Week	Ref
1	(Canada) Anna Karpenko (Toronto)	
2	(Canada) Gabrielle Lambert (Montreal)	
3	(Finland) Sofia Manner (Toronto)	
4	(Canada) Morgan McAslan (Vancouver)	
5	(Canada) Erin McLeod (Halifax)	
6	(Sweden) Mollie Eriksson (Ottawa); (Croatia) Stephanie Bukovec (Calgary)	
8	(Canada) Erin McLeod (Halifax)	
9	(Canada) Anna Karpenko (Montreal)	
10	(Canada) Morgan McAslan (Vancouver); (Sweden) Mollie Eriksson (Ottawa)	
13	(Slovakia) Anika Tóth (Halifax)	
14	(Slovakia) Anika Tóth (Halifax)	
15	(Croatia) Stephanie Bukovec (Calgary)	
16	(Finland) Sofia Manner (Toronto)	
17	(Croatia) Stephanie Bukovec (Calgary)	
18	(Canada) Morgan McAslan (Vancouver)	
19	(Croatia) Stephanie Bukovec (Calgary)	
20	(Croatia) Stephanie Bukovec (Calgary)	
21	(Slovakia) Anika Tóth (Calgary)	
22	(Canada) Melissa Dagenais (Ottawa)	
23	(Canada) Melissa Dagenais (Ottawa)	
24	(Slovakia) Anika Tóth (Halifax)	
25	(Slovakia) Anika Tóth (Halifax)	
26	(Slovakia) Anika Tóth (Halifax)	
27	(Canada) Anna Karpenko (Montreal)	

== Foreign players ==
Rosters consisted of 20–25 players, of which a maximum of eight could be international players.

The following international players were signed for the 2025 season. Note that players may be considered domestic for NSL purposes (Canadian citizens, permanent residents, or refugees) while still representing other countries in international competitions.

Club	Player 1	Player 2	Player 3	Player 4	Player 5	Player 6	Player 7	Player 8	Injured	Former
AFC Toronto	(United States) Colby Barnett	(South Korea) Hong Hye-ji	(Japan) Aoi Kizaki	(Finland) Sofia Manner	(Nigeria) Esther Okoronkwo	(United States) Croix Soto				(United States) Shaina Ashouri
Calgary Wild FC	(United States) Jorian Baucom	(Northern Ireland) Jackie Burns	(United States) Meggie Dougherty Howard	(New Zealand) Ally Green	(Australia) Kahli Johnson	(New Zealand) Meikayla Moore	(Netherlands) Mijke Roelfsema	(Venezuela) Michelle Romero		(United States) Sarah Griffith
Halifax Tides FC	(Panama) Sofia Cedeño	(New Zealand) Milly Clegg	(France) Éva Frémaux	(Iceland) Gunnhildur Yrsa Jónsdóttir	(Japan) Megumi Nakamura	(United States) Kiley Norkus	(Sweden) Sara Olai			(United States) Gianna Creighton
Montreal Roses FC	(France) Charlotte Bilbault	(United States) Lucy Cappadona	(United States) Alexandria Hess	(South Korea) Kang Chae-rim	(United States) Julia Leas	(Germany) Lara Schenk	(United States) Jodi Smith	(United States) Hailey Whitaker		
Ottawa Rapid FC	(South Korea) Choo Hyo-joo	(Norway) Johanne Fridlund	(Sweden) Ellen Gibson	(Norway) Susanne Haaland	(United States) Jyllissa Harris	(South Korea) Lee Min-a	(Nigeria) Ngozi Okobi-Okeoghene			
Vancouver Rise FC	(Philippines) Jessika Cowart	(Sweden) Sofia Hagman	(United States) Mariah Lee	(Wales) Josie Longhurst	(Egypt) Nedya Sawan	(United States) Jasmyne Spencer	(United States) Nikki Stanton	(Japan) Yuka Okamoto (New Zealand) Rebecca Lake	(Sweden) Sara Vidlund	

== Broadcasting ==
All 75 Northern Super League regular season matches were available nationally across multiple platforms. TSN aired 20 regular season games, while CBC broadcast 8.

French-language coverage was available for all Montreal Roses matches. RDS broadcast 21 matches, while 4 matches aired live on ICI Radio-Canada Télé and ICI TOU.TV.

In addition to linear broadcasts, a "Game of the Week" streamed on CBC Gem and NSL.ca, while 24 additional matches streamed on TSN+ and NSL.ca.

In the United States, ESPN+ streamed 40+ matches including select playoff games and the final.
