= 2025 Ottawa Rapid FC season =

Canadian soccer club's season of play

Ottawa Rapid FC
2025 season
- Owners: Thomas Gilbert; Diana Matheson
- Head coach: Katrine Pedersen
- Stadium: TD Place Stadium; Ottawa, Ontario

The 2025 Ottawa Rapid FC season was the first in the club's history, as well as first season in Northern Super League history.

== Squad Information and Statistics ==
=== Coaching staff ===
As of October 23, 2024.

Position	Name
Head coach	Katrine Pedersen
Assistant coach	Søren Kiilerich
Performance analyst	Carli Tingstad

=== Roster ===
As of July 31, 2025.

No.	Nat.	Name	Date of birth (age)	Since	Previous club	Notes
Goalkeepers
1	(Sweden)	Mollie Eriksson	July 23, 2000 (aged 25)	2025	(United States) North Mississauga SC	
12	(Italy)	Kelly Chiavaro	July 3, 1996 (aged 29)	2025	(Brazil) 3B da Amazônia	
30	(Canada)	Melissa Dagenais	December 7, 2000 (aged 24)	2025	(Portugal) Damaiense	
Defenders
2	(Norway)	Susanne Haaland	January 15, 1998 (aged 27)	2025	(Norway) Kolbotn	INT
18	(Canada)	Liv Scott	March 23, 2001 (aged 24)	2025	(United States) Quinnipiac Bobcats	
33	(United States)	Jyllissa Harris	April 8, 2000 (aged 25)	2025	(United States) Houston Dash	INT, Loan
Midfielders
3	(Poland)	Kayla Adamek	February 1, 1995 (aged 30)	2025	(France) Reims	
4	(Canada)	Miranda Smith	March 26, 1996 (aged 29)	2025	(Canada) Ottawa South United	
5	(Canada)	Emily Amano	August 28, 2000 (aged 24)	2025	(Iceland) Grótta	
6	(Canada)	Julia Benati	September 18, 1996 (aged 28)	2025	(Canada) FC London	
8	(Sweden)	Ellen Gibson	April 28, 1996 (aged 29)	2025	(Sweden) Hammarby	INT
10	(Canada)	Florence Belzile	April 9, 2004 (aged 21)	2025	(United States) Nebraska Cornhuskers	
11	(Canada)	Desiree Scott	July 31, 1987 (aged 38)	2025	(United States) Kansas City Current	
13	(Nigeria)	Ngozi Okobi-Okeoghene	December 14, 1993 (aged 31)	2025	(Spain) Levante Las Planas	INT
14	(South Korea)	Lee Min-a	November 8, 1991 (aged 33)	2025	(South Korea) Hyundai Steel Red Angels	INT
15	(Canada)	Nicola Golen	November 29, 2003 (aged 21)	2025	(United States) Harvard Crimson	
19	(South Korea)	Choo Hyo-joo	July 29, 2000 (aged 25)	2025	(South Korea) Hyundai Steel Red Angels	INT
21	(United States)	Melanie Forbes	June 21, 1999 (aged 26)	2025	(Iceland) Keflavík	
98	(Canada)	Stella Downing	December 6, 2002 (aged 22)	2025	(United States) Creighton Blue Jays	
Forwards
7	(Norway)	Johanne Fridlund	July 24, 1996 (aged 29)	2025	(Norway) Kolbotn	INT
9	(Canada)	Jazmine Wilkinson	March 8, 2002 (aged 23)	2025	(United States) Texas A&M Aggies	
22	(United States)	Delaney Baie Pridham	September 1, 1997 (aged 27)	2025	(Sweden) Linköping FC	

=== Statistics ===
Statistics as of 8 November 2025

==== Goals and Appearances ====
No.	Name	NSL		NSL Playoffs		Total	
No.	Name	Apps	Goals	Apps	Goals	Apps	Goals
Goalkeepers
1	(Sweden) Mollie Eriksson	8	0	0	0	8	0
30	(Canada) Melissa Dagenais	17	0	2	0	19	0
Defenders
2	(Norway) Susanne Haaland	21 (10)	0	1 (1)	0	22 (11)	0
3	(Poland) Kayla Adamek	24 (5)	0	2	0	26 (5)	0
18	(Canada) Liv Scott	24 (1)	3	2	0	26 (1)	3
19	(South Korea) Choo Hyo-joo	23 (1)	1	2	0	25 (1)	1
31	(Canada) Naomi Lofthouse	5 (5)	0	0	0	5 (5)	0
33	(United States) Jyllissa Harris	25	0	2	0	27	0
Midfielders
4	(Canada) Miranda Smith	4 (3)	0	0	0	4 (3)	0
5	(Canada) Emily Amano	6 (6)	0	2 (2)	0	8 (8)	0
6	(Canada) Julia Benati	24 (19)	3	2 (2)	0	26 (21)	3
8	(Sweden) Ellen Gibson	24 (1)	0	2	0	26 (1)	0
10	(Canada) Florence Belzile	20 (11)	2	2 (2)	0	22 (13)	1
11	(Canada) Desiree Scott	22	1	2	0	24	1
13	(Nigeria) Ngozi Okobi-Okeoghene	1 (1)	0	0	0	1 (1)	0
14	(South Korea) Lee Min-a	23 (1)	3	2	0	25 (1)	3
15	(Canada) Nicola Golen	20 (16)	1	2 (1)	0	22 (17)	1
21	(United States) Melanie Forbes	23 (10)	2	1	1	24 (10)	3
98	(Canada) Stella Downing	21 (8)	3	2 (1)	0	23 (9)	3
Forwards
7	(Norway) Johanne Fridlund	22 (11)	1	2	0	24 (11)	1
9	(Canada) Jazmine Wilkinson	8 (8)	1	0	0	8 (8)	1
22	(United States) Delaney Baie Pridham	25	18	2	2	27	20

==== Goalscorers ====
Rank	No.	Position	Name	NSL	NSL Playoffs	Total
1	22	FW	(United States) Delaney Baie Pridham	18	2	20
2	18	DF	(Canada) Liv Scott	3	0	3
2	6	MF	(Canada) Julia Benati	3	0	3
2	14	MF	(South Korea) Lee Min-a	3	0	3
2	21	MF	(Canada) Melanie Forbes	2	1	3
2	98	MF	(Canada) Stella Downing	3	0	3
7	10	MF	(Canada) Florence Belzile	2	0	2
8	7	FW	(Norway) Johanne Fridlund	1	0	1
8	9	FW	(Canada) Jazmine Wilkinson	1	0	1
8	11	MF	(Canada) Desiree Scott	1	0	1
8	15	MF	(Canada) Nicola Golen	1	0	1
8	19	DF	(South Korea) Choo Hyo-joo	1	0	1
Own goal				2	0	2
Total				41	3	44

==== Clean sheets ====
Rank	No.	Name	NSL	NSL Playoffs	Total
1	30	(Canada) Melissa Dagenais	7	0	7
2	1	(Sweden) Mollie Eriksson	2	0	2
Total			9	0	9

== Competitions ==
=== Northern Super League ===
==== Table ====
Pos	Team	Pld	W	D	L	GF	GA	GD	Pts	Qualification
1	AFC Toronto (S)	25	16	3	6	42	24	+18	51	Advance to playoffs
2	Ottawa Rapid	25	11	6	8	41	26	+15	39 (Note: Head-to-head points tied 7–7; head-to-head goal difference: Ottawa Rapid +3, Vancouver Rise –3)	Advance to playoffs
3	Vancouver Rise (C)	25	11	6	8	38	36	+2	39	Advance to playoffs
4	Montreal Roses	25	10	6	9	30	23	+7	36	Advance to playoffs
5	Calgary Wild	25	9	2	14	26	42	−16	29	
6	Halifax Tides	25	3	7	15	17	43	−26	16	

Source: NSL
Rules for classification: 1) Head-to-head points; 2) Head-to-head goal difference; 3) Overall goal difference; 4) Most wins; 5) Most goals scored; 6) Least goals conceded; 7) Least red cards; 8) Least yellow cards; 9) Drawing of lots.
(C) Champion; (S) Supporters' Shield winner

==== Results by match ====
Match	1	2	3	4	5	6	7	8	9	10	11	12	13	14	15	16	17	18	19	20	21	22	23	24	25
Ground	H	A	A	H	H	A	A	H	H	A	A	H	A	H	H	A	H	H	H	A	A	A	H	H	A
Result	W	L	D	W	D	W	L	L	W	L	W	W	D	L	D	W	L	W	D	D	W	W	L	L	W
Position (Note: Positions show the situation at the end of the week the match was played, not the position at the conclusion of matches or game days.)	3	4	4	2	4	2	3	4	3	3	3	3	3												2

Source: #Matches
H = Home; N = Neutral; A = Away; W = Win; D = Draw; L = Loss; = Playoffs

==== Matches ====
April 27 1	Ottawa Rapid	2–1	AFC Toronto	Ottawa, Ontario
13:00 ET	Lee 55'; D. Scott 81'		Hunter 90+3'	Stadium: TD Place Stadium; Attendance: 6,980; Referee: Sheila Couture

May 3 2	Montreal Roses	2–1	Ottawa Rapid	Laval, Quebec
13:30 ET	Abdu 51', (yellow card) 57'; Boychuk 69'		Lee (yellow card) 37'; Pridham 39'	Stadium: CS Bois-de-Boulogne; Attendance: 5,049; Referee: Marie-Soleil Beaudoin

May 11 3	Calgary Wild	0–0	Ottawa Rapid	Calgary, Alberta
19:00 ET			D. Scott (yellow card) 38'; Choo (yellow card) 85'	Stadium: McMahon Stadium; Attendance: 8,556; Referee: Sheila Couture

May 15 4	Ottawa Rapid	3–0	Vancouver Rise	Ottawa, Ontario
19:00 ET	Pridham 14', 51'; Benati 75'			Stadium: TD Place Stadium; Attendance: 2,142; Referee: Carly Shaw-Maclaren

May 25 5	Ottawa Rapid	1–1	Montreal Roses	Ottawa, Ontario
14:00 ET	Lee (yellow card) 24'; Pridham 90+2' (pen.)		Hill 53'	Stadium: TD Place Stadium; Attendance: 2,591; Referee: Isabelle Duclos

June 7 6	AFC Toronto	0–4	Ottawa Rapid	Toronto, Ontario
12:00 ET			Pridham 1', 20', 60' (yellow card) 43'; Downing 27'; Choo (yellow card) 50'; Golen (yellow card) 80'	Stadium: York Lions Stadium; Attendance: 2,483; Referee: Sheila Couture

June 10 7	Halifax Tides	2–1	Ottawa Rapid	Halifax, Nova Scotia
18:00 ET	Frémaux (yellow card) 43'; Nakamura 57'; Kennedy (yellow card) 67'; Jónsdóttir 74'		O. Scott 14'	Stadium: Wanderers Grounds; Attendance: 3,140; Referee: Isabelle Duclos

June 14 8	Ottawa Rapid	1–2	Montreal Roses	Ottawa, Ontario
14:00 ET	O. Scott (red card) 26'; Pridham 57' (yellow card) 75'		Abdu 23'; Boychuk 65'; Monyard (yellow card) 83'	Stadium: TD Place Stadium; Attendance: 3,576; Referee: Anne-Marie Canuel

June 21 9	Ottawa Rapid	3–1	Calgary Wild	Ottawa, Ontario
14:00 ET	Pridham 32'; Forbes 65'; Adamek (yellow card) 81'; Golen 87'		Moore (yellow card) 52'; O'Neill 83'	Stadium: TD Place Stadium; Referee: Sheila Couture

July 10 10	AFC Toronto	3–0	Ottawa Rapid	Toronto, Ontario
19:00 ET	Hunter 17' 24'; Regan (yellow card) 45+1'; Small (yellow card) 50'; Uddenberg 90'			Stadium: York Lions Stadium; Referee: Salma Flores-Desrochers

July 19 11	Calgary Wild	0–3	Ottawa Rapid	Calgary, Alberta
16:00 ET	Stordy (yellow card) 45+1'		Belzile 12'; Pridham 22'; Moore 48' (o.g.)	Stadium: McMahon Stadium; Referee: Carly Shaw-Maclaren

July 25 12	Ottawa Rapid	1–0	Halifax Tides	Ottawa, Ontario
19:30 ET	O. Scott 41'		Guay (yellow card) 37'; Allen (yellow card) 45+2'; Frémaux (yellow card) 45+2'	Stadium: TD Place Stadium; Attendance: 3,006; Referee: Isabelle Duclos

August 2 13	Vancouver Rise	3–3	Ottawa Rapid	Burnaby, British Columbia
19:00 ET	Quinn 15'; Pechersky 38'; Ward 58'; Stanton (yellow card) 66'		Pridham 13', 90+7'; Choo 21'; Haaland (yellow card) 80'	Stadium: Swangard Stadium; Attendance: 3,988; Referee: Carly Shaw-Maclaren

August 9 14	Ottawa Rapid	0–1	Calgary Wild	Ottawa, Ontario
16:00 ET	Hyo-joo (yellow card) 66'; Scott (yellow card) 67'	Report	Sawicki 76'	Stadium: TD Place Stadium; Attendance: 2,666; Referee: Anne-Marie Canuel

August 13 15	Ottawa Rapid	1–1	AFC Toronto	Ottawa, Ontario
19:00 ET	Gibson (yellow card) 11'; Lee 42'; Pridham (yellow card) 57'	Report	Hunter 21'	Stadium: TD Place Stadium; Attendance: 2,887; Referee: Salma Flores-Desrochers

August 16 16	Montreal Roses	0–2	Ottawa Rapid	Laval, Quebec
14:00 ET		Report	Pridham 8', 16'; Lee Min-a (yellow card) 23'; Haaland (yellow card) 61'	Stadium: CS Bois-de-Boulogne; Attendance: 2,100; Referee: Sheila Couture

August 24 17	Ottawa Rapid	2–3	Vancouver Rise	Ottawa, Ontario
14:00 ET	Pridham 56'; Benati 88'	Report	Chang 24', 89'; Okamoto (yellow card) 43'; Ward 75'	Stadium: TD Place Stadium; Attendance: 2,651; Referee: Salma Flores-Desrochers

August 28 18	Ottawa Rapid	5–0	Halifax Tides	Ottawa, Ontario
19:00 ET	Pridham 10'; Lee Min-A 46'; Scott 66'; Forbes 77'; Downing 83'	Report	Weichers (yellow card) 26'	Stadium: TD Place Stadium; Attendance: 953; Referee: Marie-Soleil Beaudoin

September 7 19	Ottawa Rapid	0–0	Montreal Roses	Ottawa, Ontario
12:00 ET	Belzile (yellow card) 41'; Lee Min-A (yellow card) 43'; Downing (yellow card) 49'	Report	Hill (yellow card) 39'; Boychuk (yellow card) 80'	Stadium: TD Place Stadium; Attendance: 3,722; Referee: Anne-Marie Canuel

September 13 20	Halifax Tides	1–1	Ottawa Rapid	Halifax, Nova Scotia
12:00 ET	Olai (yellow card) 7'; Nakamura 40'; Taylor (yellow card) 56'	Report	Belzile 47'	Stadium: Wanderers Grounds; Attendance: 3,501; Referee: Isabelle Duclos

September 17 21	Calgary Wild	1–2	Ottawa Rapid	Calgary, Alberta
21:00 ET	Haaland 15' (o.g.); Stordy (yellow card) 41'	Report	Benati 42'; Hyo-joo (yellow card) 44'; Forbes (yellow card) 45'; Adamek (yellow card) 80'; Pridham 90+2'; Golen (yellow card) 90+5'	Stadium: McMahon Stadium; Attendance: 2,428; Referee: Angelina Baldino

September 20 22	Vancouver Rise	0–3	Ottawa Rapid	Burnaby, British Columbia
16:00 ET	Stanton (yellow card) 62'	Report	Belzile (yellow card) 22'; Gibson (yellow card) 36'; Downing 37', (yellow card) 48'; Pridham 76'; Wilkinson 83'	Stadium: Swangard Stadium; Attendance: 4,358; Referee: Marie-Soleil Beaudoin

September 26 23	Ottawa Rapid	0–1	AFC Toronto	Ottawa, Ontario
19:00 ET	Pridham (yellow card) 32'	Report	Hunter 32'; Barnett (yellow card) 43'	Stadium: TD Place Stadium; Attendance: 3,004; Referee: Isabelle Duclos

October 8 24	Ottawa Rapid	0–2	Vancouver Rise	Ottawa, Ontario
19:30 ET	Golen (yellow card) 76'; Haaland (yellow card) 83'; Pridham (yellow card) 86'; Harris (yellow card) 90+4'	Report	Abdu 14'; De Filippo 17'; Lee (yellow card) 87'	Stadium: TD Place Stadium; Attendance: 2,906; Referee: Carly Shaw-MacLaren

October 15 25	Halifax Tides	1–2	Ottawa Rapid	Halifax, Nova Scotia
17:30 ET	Nakamura 72'	Report	Fridlund 30'; Adamek (yellow card) 42'; Jónsdóttir 45+1' (o.g.); Amano (yellow card) 35'	Stadium: Wanderers Grounds; Attendance: 4,226; Referee: Anne-Marie Canuel

=== Playoffs ===
November 4 Semi-final leg 1	Vancouver Rise	2–1	Ottawa Rapid	Burnaby, British Columbia
19:00 PT	Abdu 14', 21'; McAslan (yellow card) 90+4'	Report	Pridham 66'; Fridlund (yellow card) 77'; Adamek (yellow card) 90+5'	Stadium: Swangard Stadium; Referee: Carly Shaw-MacLaren; Assistant referees: Stéphanie Fortin; Shukwia Tajik

November 8 Semi-final leg 2	Ottawa Rapid	2–1 (4–5 p)	Vancouver Rise	Ottawa, Ontario
12:00 PT	Pridham 27', (yellow card) 90+4'; Golen (yellow card) 45+1'; Forbes 49'; Scott (yellow card) 63'; Lee (yellow card) 76'; Ellen Gibson (yellow card) 113'	Report	Ward 84'; Abdu (yellow card) 112'; Chang (yellow card) 112'	Stadium: TD Place Stadium; Attendance: 3,068; Referee: Salma Flores-Desrochers; Assistant referees: Gabrielle Lemieux; Camille Raymond
	Penalties
	Pridham (penalty scored); Harris (penalty scored); Forbes (penalty scored); Amano (penalty scored); Haaland (penalty missed); Benati (penalty missed)		(penalty missed) Pechersky; (penalty scored) Stanton; (penalty scored) Sawan; (penalty scored) Lee; (penalty scored) Abdu; (penalty scored) Hagman
