= 2026 Ottawa Rapid FC season =

Canadian soccer club's season of play

Ottawa Rapid FC
2026 season
- Owners: Thomas Gilbert; Diana Matheson; Arcadia MapleLeaf Soccer
- Head coach: Katrine Pedersen
- Stadium: TD Place Stadium; Ottawa, Ontario

The 2026 Ottawa Rapid FC season is the second in the club's history, as well as the second season in Northern Super League history.

== Summary ==
Ottawa Rapid finished 2nd in the league during the 2025 season.

On February 20, 2026, it was announced that as part of its preseason the Rapid would play a friendly against Bay FC at PayPal Park on April 17, 2026, the first-ever match open to the public between an NSL and an NWSL team.

On March 6, 2026, it was announced that Arcadia MapleLeaf Soccer had become majority owners of Ottawa Rapid.

On 17 July 2026, the club announced that Katrine Pedersen would depart Ottawa Rapid after the conclusion of the 2026 season.

On 10 August 2026, the club announced that Carmelina Moscato would take over as head coach after the 2026 season.

== Team ==
=== Coaching staff ===
Position	Name
Head coach	Katrine Pedersen
Performance analyst	Carli Tingstad

=== Roster ===
As of 12 February 2026

No.	Nat.	Name	Date of birth (age)	Since	Previous club	Notes
Goalkeepers
1	(Sweden)	Mollie Eriksson	July 23, 2000 (aged 25)	2025	(United States) North Mississauga SC	
30	(Canada)	Melissa Dagenais	December 7, 2000 (aged 25)	2025	(Portugal) Damaiense	
Defenders
2	(Norway)	Susanne Haaland	January 15, 1998 (aged 28)	2025	(Norway) Kolbotn	INT
18	(Canada)	Liv Scott	March 23, 2001 (aged 24)	2025	(United States) Quinnipiac Bobcats	
33	(United States)	Jyllissa Harris	April 8, 2000 (aged 25)	2025	(United States) Houston Dash	INT, Loan
Midfielders
3	(Poland)	Kayla Adamek	February 1, 1995 (aged 31)	2025	(France) Reims	
5	(Canada)	Emily Amano	August 28, 2000 (aged 25)	2025	(Iceland) Grótta	
6	(Canada)	Caitlin Crichton	February 7, 2003 (aged 23)	2026	(Finland) KTP	
10	(Canada)	Florence Belzile	April 9, 2004 (aged 21)	2025	(United States) Nebraska Cornhuskers	
12	(Canada)	Sadie Waite	October 21, 2004 (aged 21)	2026	(United States) Nebraska Cornhuskers	
13	(Nigeria)	Ngozi Okobi-Okeoghene	December 14, 1993 (aged 32)	2025	(Spain) Levante Las Planas	INT
14	(South Korea)	Lee Min-a	November 8, 1991 (aged 34)	2025	(South Korea) Hyundai Steel Red Angels	INT
15	(Canada)	Nicola Golen	November 29, 2003 (aged 22)	2025	(United States) Harvard Crimson	
19	(South Korea)	Choo Hyo-joo	July 29, 2000 (aged 25)	2025	(South Korea) Hyundai Steel Red Angels	INT
20	(South Korea)	Jung Min-young	September 28, 2000 (aged 25)	2026	(South Korea) Seoul City Hall	
21	(United States)	Melanie Forbes	June 21, 1999 (aged 26)	2025	(Iceland) Keflavík	
Forwards
7	(Norway)	Johanne Fridlund	July 24, 1996 (aged 29)	2025	(Norway) Kolbotn	INT
9	(Canada)	Jazmine Wilkinson	March 8, 2002 (aged 23)	2025	(United States) Texas A&M Aggies	
22	(United States)	Delaney Baie Pridham	September 1, 1997 (aged 28)	2025	(Sweden) Linköping FC	

== Competitions ==
=== Pre-season ===
April 17, 2026 Friendly	Bay FC	1–0	Ottawa Rapid FC	San Jose, California
7:00 p.m. PDT (UTC-7)	Conti 59' (pen.)	Report		Stadium: PayPal Park

=== Northern Super League ===
==== Table ====
Pos	Team	Pld	W	D	L	GF	GA	GD	Pts	Playoff qualification
1	Montreal Roses (S)	25	12	9	4	43	27	+16	45	Advance to playoffs
2	Ottawa Rapid	25	12	4	9	49	44	+5	40	Advance to playoffs
3	AFC Toronto	25	10	9	6	38	24	+14	39	Advance to playoffs
4	Vancouver Rise	25	9	4	12	47	55	−8	31	Advance to playoffs
5	Halifax Tides	25	7	8	10	24	24	0	29	
6	Calgary Wild	25	5	6	14	28	55	−27	21	

Source: NSL
Rules for classification: 1) Points 2) Head-to-head points; 3) Head-to-head goal difference; 4) Goal difference; 5) Wins; 6) Goals scored; 7) Goals conceded; 8) Least red cards; 9) Least yellow cards; 10) Drawing of lots.
(S) Supporters' Shield winner

==== Matches ====
===== April and May =====
April 25, 2026 1	Halifax Tides	3–1	Ottawa Rapid FC	Halifax, Nova Scotia
	Weichers 38'; Rhodes 78'; Vallerand 84'	Report	Golen 80'; Choo (yellow card) 86'	Stadium: Wanderers Grounds; Attendance: 4,030; Referee: Myriam Marcotte

May 2, 2026 2	Ottawa Rapid FC	5–2	Calgary Wild	Ottawa, Ontario
	Forbes 1'; Melenhorst 25', 33' (yellow card) 53'; Belzile 29'; Choo 63'		Dougherty Howard 11'; Stewart 12'	Stadium: TD Place Stadium; Attendance: 2,855; Referee: Isabelle Duclos

May 6, 2026 3	Ottawa Rapid FC	4–0	Vancouver Rise FC	Ottawa, Ontario
16:00 PT	Adamek 29'; Pridham 36', 42'; Waite 76'	Report		Stadium: TD Place Stadium; Attendance: 1,321; Referee: Carly Shaw-MacLaren

May 13, 2026 4	Ottawa Rapid FC	2–0	Halifax Tides FC	Ottawa, Ontario
	Waite 35'; Choo 77'; Golen (yellow card) 85'	Report	Allen (yellow card) 63'; Vallerand (yellow card) 75'	Stadium: TD Place Stadium; Attendance: 1,295; Referee: Anne-Marie Canuel

May 23, 2026 5	Ottawa Rapid FC	1–2	Montreal Roses FC	Ottawa, Ontario
	Choo 62'	Report	Boychuk 15', 45'; Hill (yellow card) 45+2'	Stadium: TD Place Stadium; Attendance: 1,877; Referee: Sheila Couture

May 29, 2026 6	Halifax Tides FC	1–2	Ottawa Rapid FC	Halifax, Nova Scotia
	Benati 70'; Allen (yellow card) 90+4'	Report	Harris 38'; Pridham 88'	Stadium: Wanderers Grounds; Attendance: 3,501; Referee: Yusri Rudolf

===== June =====
June 14, 2026 7	Vancouver Rise	1–3	Ottawa Rapid FC	Burnaby, British Columbia
14:00 PT	De Filippo 43', (yellow card) 52'; Faulknor (red card) 72'	Report	Lee 28'; Pridham 50', 74' (pen.)	Stadium: Swangard Stadium; Attendance: 3,723; Referee: Mario Alayass

June 21, 2026 7	Ottawa Rapid FC	1–1	AFC Toronto	Ottawa, Ontario
	Pridham 3'; Melenhorst (yellow card) 45+1'; Choo (yellow card) 57'; Belzile (yellow card) 78'	Report	Rowe 7'; Stratigakis (yellow card) 33'	Stadium: TD Place Stadium; Attendance: 3,069; Referee: Isabelle Duclos

June 25, 2026 9	Montreal Roses	1–2	Ottawa Rapid FC	Laval, Quebec
	Minas (yellow card) 28'; Badu (yellow card) 39'; Bennett 89'	Report	Melenhorst 12'; Forbes 69'	Stadium: Stade Boréale; Attendance: 1,792; Referee: Carly Shaw-Maclaren

===== July =====
July 5, 2026 10	Ottawa Rapid FC	3–1	Calgary Wild FC	Ottawa, Ontario
	Melenhorst 17'; Fridlund 42'; Harris (yellow card) 60'; Wilkinson 90+2'		Dougherty Howard 65'; Stordy (yellow card) 67'	Stadium: TD Place Stadium; Attendance: 2,631; Referee: Roberto D'Alesio

July 11, 2026 11	AFC Toronto	1–2	Ottawa Rapid FC	Toronto, Ontario
	Rowe 2'; Barnett (red card) 59'	Report	Lee 12'; Melenhorst (yellow card) 62'; Baie Pridham 87'	Stadium: York Lions Stadium; Attendance: 2,519; Referee: Angelina Baldino

July 16, 2026 12	Ottawa Rapid FC	2–1	Halifax Tides FC	Ottawa, Ontario
	Baie Pridham 41'; Waite 55'; Lee (yellow card) 66'; Wilkinson (yellow card) 90+4'	Report	Cho 59'	Stadium: TD Place Stadium; Attendance: 2,405; Referee: Myriam Marcotte

July 22, 2026 13	Calgary Wild	1–2	Ottawa Rapid FC	Calgary, Alberta
	Johnson 50'	Report	Melenhorst 36'; Fridlund 72'; Choo (yellow card) 90+2'	Stadium: McMahon Stadium; Attendance: 2,210; Referee: Anne-Marie Canuel

===== August =====
August 3, 2026 14 (Note: This game doubled as a quarter-final match in the 2026–27 W Canadian Championship and counted in both competitions; this game counted as a 2–2 draw in the NSL standings and a 3–2 victory in the W Canadian Championship.)	Halifax Tides FC	2–3 (a.e.t.)	Ottawa Rapid FC	Halifax, Nova Scotia
3:00 pm ADT	Rhodes 49', 62'	Report	Belzile 83'; Wilkinson 90+2'; Golen 107'	Stadium: Wanderers Grounds; Attendance: 3,682; Referee: Myriam Marcotte

August 9, 2026 15	Ottawa Rapid FC	2–2	AFC Toronto	Ottawa, Ontario
	Forbes 13'; Adamek (yellow card) 55'; Hyo-Joo (red card) 62'; Golen 90+1'	Report	Stratigakis 34'; Uddenberg (red card) 62'; Zadorsky 77'	Stadium: TD Place Stadium; Attendance: 3,152; Referee: Scott Bowman

August 15, 2026 16	Calgary Wild FC	4–3	Ottawa Rapid FC	Calgary, Alberta
	Johnson 14'; Thurton 27', 45+3'; Baucom 76'	Report	Jung 37' (yellow card) 90+4'; Forbes 45'; Baie Pridham (yellow card) 55' (red card) 58'; Harris 85'	Stadium: McMahon Stadium; Attendance: 3,231; Referee: Isabelle Duclos

August 22, 2026 17	Ottawa Rapid FC	1–5	Vancouver Rise	Ottawa, Ontario
16:00 PT	Fridlund (yellow card) 45'; Jung (yellow card) 63'; Bell 81'	Report	Reyes (yellow card) 21', (goal) 56'; López (yellow card) 28', (goal) 65'; Lamontagne 45+1', 46'; Bout 48'	Stadium: TD Place Stadium; Attendance: 4,453; Referee: Ben Hoskins

August 30, 2026 18	AFC Toronto	2–1	Ottawa Rapid FC	Toronto, Ontario
	Hunter 73'; Stratigakis 86'	Report	Jung (yellow card) 72'; Belzile 89'	Stadium: BMO Field; Attendance: 7,157; Referee: Carly Shaw-Maclaren

===== September =====
September 6, 2026 19	Ottawa Rapid FC	2–3	Montreal Roses	Ottawa, Ontario
	Fridlund 30'; Melenhorst 61'; Harris (yellow card) 90+4'	Report	Bennett 4'; Pechersky 17'; Whitaker (yellow card) 48'; Paquin 87'	Stadium: TD Place Stadium; Attendance: 2,962; Referee: Sheila Couture

September 13, 2026 20	Vancouver Rise	4–0	Ottawa Rapid FC	Burnaby, British Columbia
13:00 PT	François 31'; De Filippo 53'; Abdu 58'; Longhurst 60'	Report		Stadium: Swangard Stadium; Attendance: 2,415; Referee: Yusri Rudolf

September 20, 2026 21	Ottawa Rapid FC	3–1	Calgary Wild FC	Ottawa, Ontario
	Okobi-Okeoghene 4', 78'; Fridlund 25'	Report	St-Jean 77'	Stadium: TD Place Stadium; Attendance: 2,048; Referee: Thomas Noel

September 26, 2026 22	AFC Toronto	3–0	Ottawa Rapid FC	Toronto, Ontario
	Silano 44', 49'; Stratigakis 82'	Report		Stadium: York Lions Stadium; Attendance: 2,251; Referee: Carly Shaw-Maclaren

===== October =====
October 2, 2026 23	Montreal Roses	0–0	Ottawa Rapid FC	Laval, Quebec
		Report	Scott (yellow card) 78'; Wilkinson (yellow card) 86'	Stadium: Stade Boréale; Attendance: 2,753; Referee: Yusri Rudolf

October 18, 2026 24	Ottawa Rapid FC	5–2	Vancouver Rise FC	Ottawa, Ontario
	27', 90+2' Pridham; (yellow card) 32' Lee; (yellow card) 48' Golen; (yellow card) 52' Waite; 53', 68' Belzile; 87' Bell	Report	16' Bout; 17' Abdu; (yellow card) 71' Lamontagne; (yellow card) 79' Stanton	Stadium: TD Place Stadium; Attendance: 3,842; Referee: Isabella Duclos

October 23, 2026 25	Montreal Roses	1–0	Ottawa Rapid FC	Laval, Quebec
	Boychuk 80'; Thibault (yellow card) 90+4'	Report		Stadium: Stade Boréale; Attendance: 3,340; Referee: Renzo Villanueva

===== Playoffs =====
October 31, 2026 Quarter-finals Leg 1	AFC Toronto	4–2	Ottawa Rapid FC	North York, Ontario
2:00 pm EST	Lantaigne 11' (yellow card) 62'; Hasenauer (yellow card) 12'; Hunter 25', 66'; Silano 54'	Report	Forbes (yellow card) 19'; Melenhorst (yellow card) 47' (goal) 90'; Choo 58'; Adamek (yellow card) 88'	Stadium: York Lions Stadium; Referee: Scott Bowman

November 7, 2026 Quarter-finals Leg 2	Ottawa Rapid FC	0–4	AFC Toronto	Ottawa, Ontario
	Melenhorst (yellow card) 74'	Report	Hunter 6', 29'; Silano 44'; Small 52'; Zadorsky (yellow card) 61'	Stadium: TD Place Stadium; Referee: Alain Ruch

=== W Canadian Championship ===
April 2027 Semi-finals	TBD	v	TBD	TBD
				Stadium: TBD

== Transactions ==
=== Contract operations ===
Date	Player	Pos.	Notes	Ref.
28 November 2025	(South Korea) Choo Hyo-joo	MF	Contract through the 2026 season	
27 December 2025	(Canada) Emily Amano	MF	Contract through the 2026 season	
6 January 2026	(Canada) Nicola Golen	MF	Contract through the 2026 season	
27 July 2026	(Canada) Keera Melenhorst	MF	Contract through the 2027 season	
17 August 2026	(Canada) Delaney Baie Pridham	FW	Contract through the 2027 season	

=== Transfers in ===
No.	Pos.	Player	From club	Fee/notes	Date	Source
12	MF	(Canada) Sadie Waite	(United States) Nebraska Cornhuskers	Two year contract	11 January 2026	
33	DF	(United States) Jyllissa Harris	(United States) Houston Dash	Loan extension for the 2026 season	26 January 2026	
20	MF	(South Korea) Jung Min-young	(South Korea) Seoul City Hall	Transfer	6 February 2026	
6	MF	(Canada) Caitlin Crichton	(Finland) KTP	Transfer	12 February 2026	
	DF	(Canada) Elise Bell	(Canada) Guelph United FC	Transfer	21 August 2026	
	DF	(Canada) Hannah Chown	(Canada) Simcoe County Rovers FC	Transfer	21 August 2026	
