= Naomi Lofthouse =

Canadian soccer player

Personal information
- Date of birth: January 9, 2008 (age 18)
- Place of birth: Ottawa, Ontario, Canada
- Height: 5 ft 6 in (1.68 m)
- Position: Forward

Team information
- Current team: Ottawa South United

Youth career
- Ottawa South United
- NDC Ontario

Senior career*
Years	Team	Apps	(Gls)
2024–	Ottawa South United	15	(2)
2025–	→ Ottawa Rapid FC (loan)	11	(0)
- * Club domestic league appearances and goals as of October 30, 2026

Naomi Lofthouse (born January 9, 2008) is a soccer player who plays for Ottawa South United in Ligue1 Québec and for the Ottawa Rapid FC in the Northern Super League.

== Early life ==
Lofthouse played youth soccer with Ottawa South United before joining the NDC Ontario program in January 2023.

== Club career ==
In 2024, Lofthouse began playing with Ottawa South United in Ligue1 Québec. On April 27, 2025, she signed a youth development permit with Ottawa Rapid FC in the professional Northern Super League. She made her professional debut that day, coming on as a substitute for Desiree Scott against AFC Toronto. She made her first start for the Rapid on May 29, 2026, featuring in a 2-1 win over Halifax Tides FC.

== Career statistics ==
As of October 30, 2026

Club	Season	League			Playoffs		Domestic Cup		League Cup		Total	
Club	Season	Division	Apps	Goals	Apps	Goals	Apps	Goals	Apps	Goals	Apps	Goals
Ottawa South United	2024	Ligue1 Québec	3	0	—		—		—		3	0
Ottawa South United	2025	Ligue1 Québec	9	1	—		—		—		9	1
Ottawa South United	2025	Ligue1 Québec	3	1	—		—		2	0	5	1
Ottawa South United	Total		15	2	0	0	0	0	2	0	17	2
Ottawa Rapid FC (loan)	2025	Northern Super League	5	0	0	0	—		—		5	0
Ottawa Rapid FC (loan)	2026	Northern Super League	6	0	0	0	—		—		6	0
Ottawa Rapid FC (loan)	Total		11	0	0	0	0	0	0	0	11	0
Career total			26	2	0	0	0	0	2	0	29	1
