= Erik Stoffelshaus =

German football executive (born 1970)

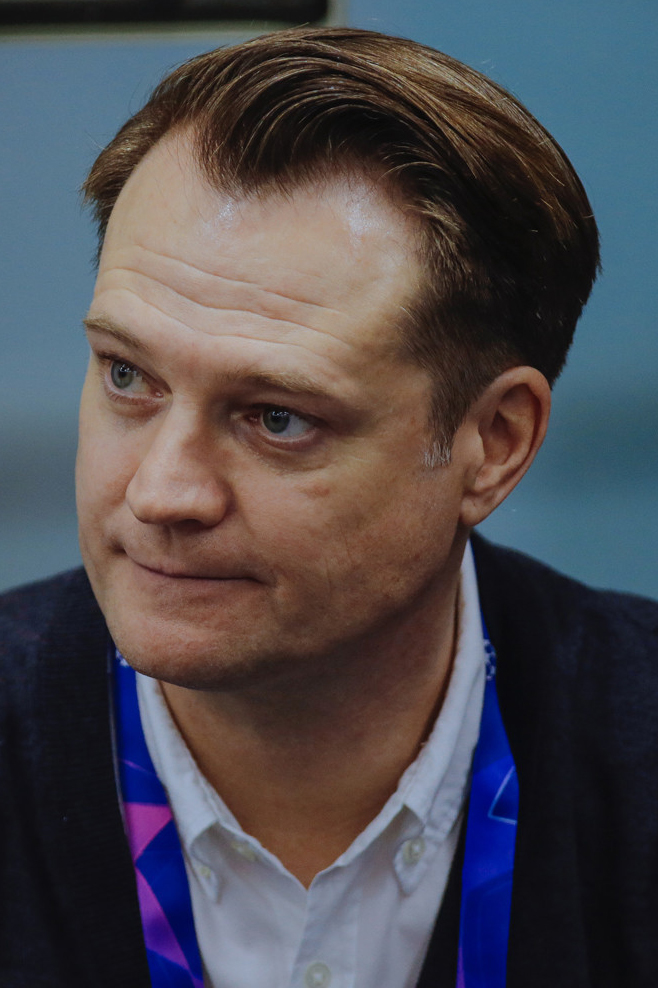
- Stoffelshaus in 2018
- Born: 14 December 1970 (age 55); Mülheim, West Germany
- Education: Ruhr University Bochum
- Occupation: Football official

Erik Stoffelshaus (born 14 December 1970) is a German football executive. Most recently he was the Sporting Director of the Russian Premier League club Lokomotiv Moscow.

== Career ==
=== Youth coach and education ===
Prior to his footballing career, he worked as Industrial Management Assistant at Thyssen Stahl AG. After passing his exams in Sports Science at the Ruhr University Bochum, In 1998, Erik Stoffelshaus became coach of the FC Schalke 04 Under-11-/Under-12-team.

=== Management at Schalke 04 ===
On 1 July 2000, he switched from the Schalke 04 coaching staff to the club management. In his position, he supported Bodo Menze, manager of the club's youth teams. During this time, the Schalke's youth teams won two championships and two cups. In 2002, Stoffelshaus acquired the UEFA A Licence for football trainers. In July 2006, Stoffelshaus became Manager of Player Development and Assistant Manager to Andreas Müller. He was involved in the signing of the players Heiko Westermann, Ivan Rakitic, Jermaine Jones and Jefferson Farfan. His time with Schalke ended on 26 May 2009.

=== Technical director in Canada ===
In November 2013, Stoffelshaus became technical director of West Ottawa Soccer Club in Canada. In March 2015, he became technical director of the Football Association of the region York in Toronto.

=== Sporting director at Lokomotiv Moscow ===
On 22 January 2017, Stoffelshaus was presented as the new director of football of the Russian-Premier-League-club Lokomotiv Moscow. Only a few months later, Stoffelshaus won his first trophy with Lokomotiv. On 2 May 2017, the club won the Russian Cup for the seventh time in the club history. Because of this victory, Lokomotiv qualified for the UEFA Europa League the following season. Lokomotiv reached the round of sixteen, in which it was defeated by Atletico Madrid who went on to win the Europa League Championship. In his second season, Stoffelshaus won his second trophy. On 5 May 2018, the club won the Russian Premier League Championship for the third time in club history. Stoffelshaus resigned as Sport Director of Lokomotiv Moscow on 31 December 2018.

== Other ==
After his time at Schalke, Stoffelshaus earned a certificate as a teacher of sports. In 2018, he completed his Masters of Business Administration in sports management at the Universidad Europea de Madrid.
