= Caitlin Crichton =

Canadian soccer player (born 2003)

Personal information
- Full name: Caitlin Joyce Crichton
- Date of birth: February 7, 2003 (age 23)
- Place of birth: Ottawa, Ontario, Canada
- Height: 5 ft 10 in (1.78 m)
- Position: Midfielder

Team information
- Current team: Ottawa Rapid FC

Youth career
- Ottawa Internationals SC

College career
| Years | Team | Apps | (Gls) |
| 2021–2024 | St. Francis Xavier X-Women | 47 | (12) |

Senior career*
| Years | Team | Apps | (Gls) |
| 2022–2023 | Electric City FC | 33 | (4) |
| 2024 | Guelph United FC | 17 | (0) |
| 2024 | → Guelph United FC B | 2 | (0) |
| 2025 | KTP | 25 | (2) |
| 2026– | Ottawa Rapid FC | 11 | (0) |
- * Club domestic league appearances and goals as of October 30, 2026

Caitlin Joyce Crichton (born February 7, 2003) is a Canadian soccer player who plays for Ottawa Rapid FC in the Northern Super League.

== University career ==
In 2021, Crichton began attending St. Francis Xavier University, where she played for the women's soccer team. In 2022, she was named an AUS Second Team All-Star. In 2023, she was named an AUS First Team All-Star. In 2024, she was named an AUS First Team All-Star and a U Sports Second Team All-Canadian.

== Club career ==
In March 2022, Crichton signed with Electric City FC in League1 Ontario.

In January 2024, Crichton signed with Guelph United FC in League1 Ontario. At the end of the season, she was named a league First Team All-Star.

In April 2025, she signed with Finnish Kansallinen Ykkönen club KTP on a two-year contract.

In early 2026, it was announced that she would join Simcoe County Rovers in the Ontario Premier League (formerly League1 Ontario). However, in February 2026, she signed with Northern Super League club Ottawa Rapid FC.

== Career statistics ==
As of October 30, 2026

| Club | Season | League | | | Playoffs | | National Cup | | League Cup | | Total | |
| Club | Season | League | Apps | Goals | Apps | Goals | Apps | Goals | Apps | Goals | Apps | Goals |
|---|---|---|---|---|---|---|---|---|---|---|---|---|
| Electric City FC | 2022 | League1 Ontario | 16 | 0 | — | | — | | — | | 16 | 0 |
| Electric City FC | 2022 | League1 Ontario | 17 | 4 | — | | — | | — | | 17 | 4 |
| Electric City FC | Total | | 33 | 4 | 0 | 0 | 0 | 0 | 0 | 0 | 33 | 4 |
| Guelph United FC | 2024 | League1 Ontario Premier | 17 | 0 | — | | — | | 2 | 0 | 19 | 0 |
| Guelph United FC B | 2024 | League2 Ontario | 2 | 0 | — | | — | | — | | 2 | 0 |
| KTP | 2025 | Kansallinen Ykkönen | 25 | 2 | — | | 5 | 1 | — | | 30 | 3 |
| Ottawa Rapid FC | 2026 | Northern Super League | 11 | 0 | 0 | 0 | — | | — | | 11 | 0 |
| Career total | | | 88 | 6 | 0 | 0 | 5 | 1 | 2 | 0 | 95 | 7 |
