= Nicola Golen =

Canadian soccer player (born 2003)

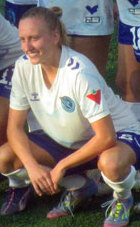
- Golen in 2025

Personal information
- Date of birth: November 29, 2003 (age 22)
- Place of birth: Toronto, Ontario, Canada
- Height: 5 ft 8 in (1.73 m)
- Position: Forward

Team information
- Current team: Ottawa Rapid FC
- Number: 15

Youth career
- Royal York FC
- NDC Ontario
- North Toronto Nitros

College career
Years	Team	Apps	(Gls)
2021–2024	Harvard Crimson	42	(3)

Senior career*
Years	Team	Apps	(Gls)
2019	DeRo United FC	10	(1)
2022–2024	North Toronto Nitros	23	(1)
2024	→ North Toronto Nitros B	1	(0)
2025–	Ottawa Rapid FC	44	(4)
- * Club domestic league appearances and goals as of October 30, 2026

Nicola Golen (born November 29, 2003) is a Canadian soccer player who plays for Ottawa Rapid FC in the Northern Super League.

== Early life ==
Golen played youth soccer with Royal York FC, NDC Ontario, and the North Toronto Nitros and played for Team Ontario from 2017 to 2019.

== College career ==
In 2021, Golen began attending Harvard University, where she played for the women's soccer team. On September 2, 2022, she scored her first collegiate goal in a 4-0 victory over the UNC Greensboro Spartans.

== Club career ==
In 2019, Golen played with DeRo United FC in League1 Ontario.

In 2022, she began playing with the North Toronto Nitros in League1 Ontario.

In 2025, she signed with Northern Super League club Ottawa Rapid FC. On May 25, 2025, after having been away from the club due to completing her university exams, she made her debut for the team, in a substitute appearance against Montreal Roses FC. On June 21, 2025, she scored her first goal in a 3-1 victory over Calgary Wild FC. Golen was substituted on for the beginning of the second half and provided an assist to DB Pridham as the Rapid lost 2-1 against Vancouver Rise FC in the first leg of the semifinal in the inaugural NSL playoffs on November 4, 2025. On January 6, 2026, it was announced that she had signed a contract extension to keep her with the Rapid through 2026. Speaking about Golen remaining with the Rapid, the club's technical director Kristina Kiss said “She’s exceptionally creative on the ball and she’s a great teammate to boot. We’re just beginning to scratch the surface of her potential, and we are very happy to have her back for 2026.” Golen scored in a 3-1 loss against Halifax Tides FC on April 25, 2026, the Rapid's opening game of the 2026 season.

== International career ==
In 2019, Golen was called up to a camp with the Canada U17.

In January 2022, she was called up to a camp with the Canada U20.

== Personal life ==
Golen is the daughter of former professional player Ralph Golen.

== Career statistics ==
As of October 30, 2026

Club	Season	League			Playoffs		Domestic Cup		League Cup		Total	
Club	Season	Division	Apps	Goals	Apps	Goals	Apps	Goals	Apps	Goals	Apps	Goals
DeRo United FC	2019	League1 Ontario	10	1	—		—		—		10	1
North Toronto Nitros	2022	League1 Ontario	2	0	—		—		—		2	0
North Toronto Nitros	2023	League1 Ontario	10	1	1	0	—		—		11	1
North Toronto Nitros	2024	League1 Ontario Premier	11	0	—		—		3	1	14	1
North Toronto Nitros	Total		23	1	1	0	0	0	3	1	27	2
North Toronto Nitros B	2024	League2 Ontario	1	0	—		—		—		1	0
Ottawa Rapid FC	2025	Northern Super League	20	1	2	0	—		—		22	1
Ottawa Rapid FC	2026	Northern Super League	24	3	0	0	—		—		24	3
Ottawa Rapid FC	Total		44	4	2	0	0	0	0	0	46	4
Career total			78	6	3	0	0	0	3	1	84	7
