= Sofia Hagman (footballer) =

Swedish footballer (born 1997)

Personal information
- Full name: Anna Sofia Ulrika Hagman
- Date of birth: 21 March 1997 (age 29)
- Place of birth: Stockholm, Sweden
- Height: 1.76 m (5 ft 9 in)
- Position: Midfielder

Team information
- Current team: Bodø/Glimt

Senior career*
Years	Team	Apps	(Gls)
2011–2014	Vara SK	73	(35)
2015	FC Rosengård	0	(0)
2016–2020	Kristianstads DFF	51	(4)
2021–2022	Apollon Ladies	17	(5)
2022–2024	Sporting de Huelva	44	(2)
2024	Vittsjö GIK	4	(0)
2025	Vancouver Rise FC	14	(0)
2026–	Bodø/Glimt	0	(0)
- * Club domestic league appearances and goals as of 17 October 2025

Anna Sofia Ulrika Hagman (born 21 March 1997) is a Swedish professional footballer who plays as a midfielder for Norwegian club Bodø/Glimt in the Toppserien.

== Club career ==
Hagman began her career with Vara SK in the Swedish lower divisions.

In November 2014, Hagman signed with FC Rosengård in the first tier Damallsvenskan for the 2015 season.

In 2016, she began playing with Kristianstads DFF in the Damallsvenskan. However, she suffered an injury during a pre-season friendly against Kopparbergs/Göteborg FC on 28 March 2016, causing her to miss the next one and a half seasons, returning in September 2017. In January 2018, she signed an extension with the club.

In February 2021, Hagman signed with Cypriot First Division club Apollon Ladies for the remainder of the season. In April 2021, she extended her contract for another season.

In July 2022, Hagman signed with Spanish Liga F club Sporting de Huelva.

In August 2024, she returned to Sweden to sign with Vittsjö GIK in the Damallsvenskan.

In January 2025, she signed with Canadian club Vancouver Rise FC of the Northern Super League. On 8 November 2025, she converted the winning penalty in the sixth round of penalty kicks, helping the Rise to a 3–3 (5–4 on penalties) semifinal against Ottawa Rapid FC and qualifying for the inaugural NSL playoff Final.

In January 2026, she signed with Norwegian club Bodø/Glimt in the Toppserien.
