= Ellen Gibson =

Swedish footballer (born 1996)

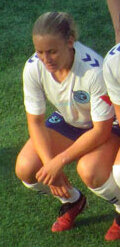
- Gibson in 2025

Personal information
- Full name: Ellen Linnea Christina Gibson
- Date of birth: 28 April 1996 (age 30)
- Place of birth: Stockholm, Sweden
- Position: Midfielder

Youth career
- 2004–2010: Hammarby IF

College career
Years	Team	Apps	(Gls)
2015	Santa Clara Broncos	12	(0)

Senior career*
Years	Team	Apps	(Gls)
2011–2014	Hammarby IF	59	(2)
2017–2024	Hammarby IF	138	(3)
2025	Ottawa Rapid	24	(0)

International career
2011–2013	Sweden U17	17	(0)
2013–2014	Sweden U19	2	(0)
- * Club domestic league appearances and goals as of 17 October 2025

Ellen Linnea Christina Gibson (born 28 April 1996) is a Swedish professional footballer who plays as a midfielder.

== Early life ==
Gibson was born in Stockholm, Sweden. She developed an interest in football at an early age and joined the youth academy of Hammarby IF, where she trained as a midfielder.

== Club career ==
=== Hammarby IF ===
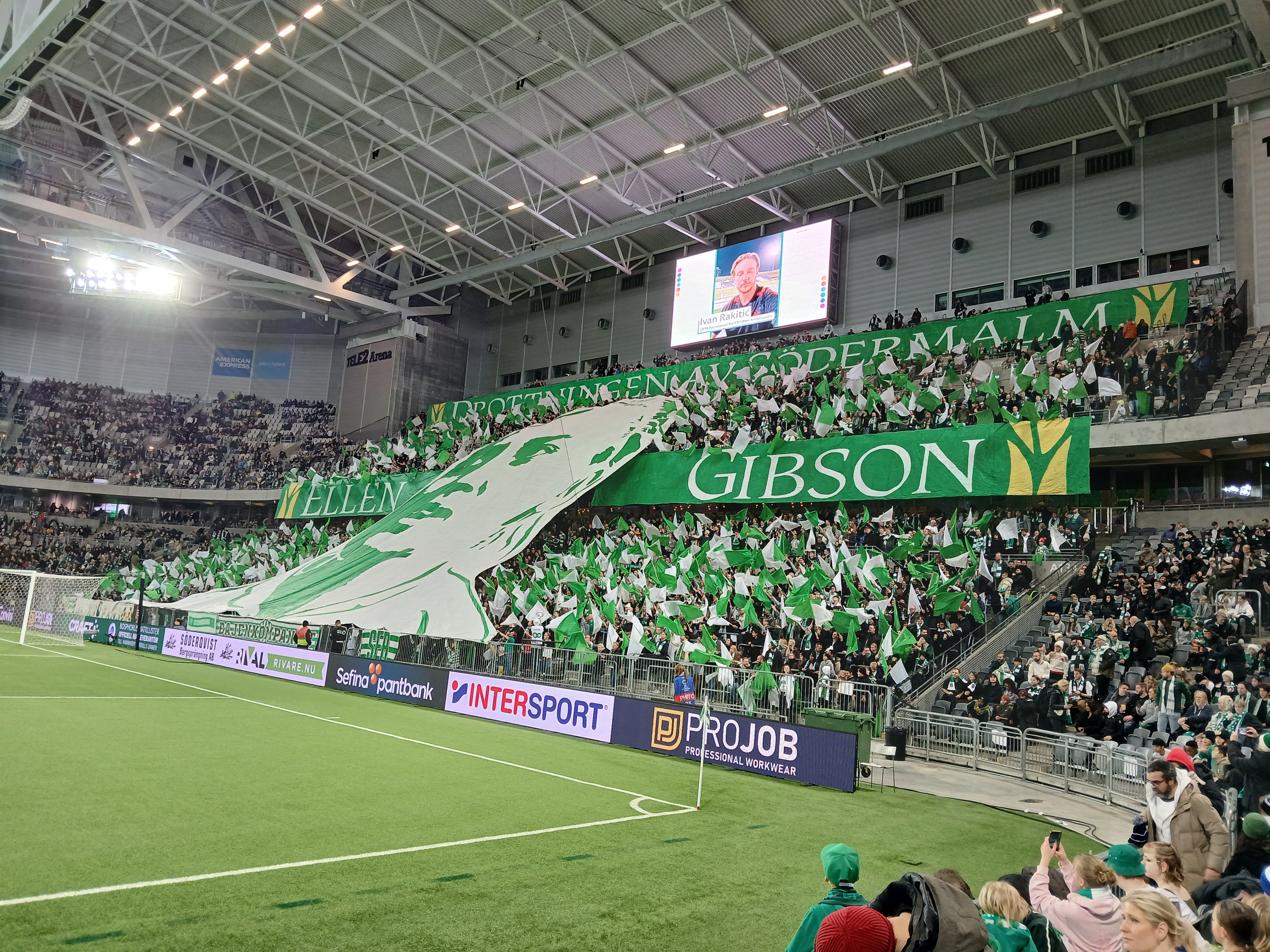
A tifo dedicated to Gibson at her final game for Hammarby

Gibson began her senior career with Hammarby IF in 2011, playing in the Elitettan, the second tier of Swedish women's football. She played for Hammarby until 2014 before moving to the United States to play for the Santa Clara Broncos in 2015. After finishing her college career, Gibson returned to Hammarby IF in 2017, where she became a pivotal figure in the midfield.

During her time at Hammarby, Gibson established herself as a club icon, known for her consistent performances and leadership on the field. She played a key role in the team's success, including winning the Damallsvenskan in 2023 and the Svenska Cupen in 2022.

Her commitment to the club and her performances made her one of the most beloved players in Hammarby history, with fans seeing her as an embodiment of the team's spirit and identity. In a 2023 interview, Gibson reflected on her long association with the club, stating that "Bajen är en del av min identitet" ("Hammarby is part of my identity").

At the end of the 2024 season, Hammarby IF chose not to renew Gibson's contract.

=== Ottawa Rapid ===
On 27 January 2025, Gibson signed with Canadian side Ottawa Rapid in the newly-launched Northern Super League.

== International career ==
Gibson has represented Sweden at various youth levels, including the U17 and U19 teams, and has been part of the national setup for several years. While she has not yet made a senior appearance for the Swedish women's national team, her performances at the club level have earned her recognition as one of Sweden's promising midfielders.

== Playing style ==
Gibson is known for her tactical awareness and ability to read the game. As a midfielder, she is skilled in distributing passes and controlling the tempo of the match. Gibson is also praised for her ability to recover possession and break up opposition attacks. Her versatility has allowed her to play in various roles across the midfield, contributing both defensively and offensively. She is recognized for her strong work ethic and leadership qualities.

== Career statistics ==
As of 8 November 2025

Appearances and goals by club, season, and competition
Club	Season	League			National cup		Other		Total	
Club	Season	Division	Apps	Goals	Apps	Goals	Apps	Goals	Apps	Goals
Hammarby IF	2011	Damallsvenskan	1	0	–		0	0	1	0
Hammarby IF	2012	Division 1 Norrettan	14	0	1	1	0	0	15	1
Hammarby IF	2013	Elitettan	24	1	1	0	0	0	25	1
Hammarby IF	2014	Elitettan	20	1	2	0	0	0	22	1
Hammarby IF	2017	Damallsvenskan	12	0	4	0	0	0	16	0
Hammarby IF	2018	Damallsvenskan	8	0	4	0	0	0	12	0
Hammarby IF	2019	Elitettan	25	0	2	0	0	0	27	0
Hammarby IF	2020	Elitettan	23	1	5	0	0	0	28	1
Hammarby IF	2021	Damallsvenskan	21	0	4	0	0	0	25	0
Hammarby IF	2022	Damallsvenskan	19	1	5	0	0	0	24	1
Hammarby IF	2023	Damallsvenskan	18	1	3	0	0	0	21	1
Hammarby IF	2024	Damallsvenskan	12	0	2	0	0	0	14	0
Ottawa Rapid FC	2025	Northern Super League	24	0	–		2	0	26	0
Total			221	5	33	1	2	0	256	6

== Honours ==
Hammarby IF

- Damallsvenskan: 2023
- Svenska Cupen: 2022

Individual

- Hammarby IF Player of the Year: 2023
