= Julia Benati =

Canadian soccer player (born 1996)

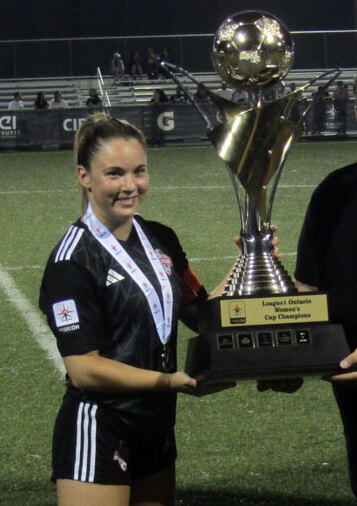
- Benati accepting the L1O League Cup Championship trophy in 2024

Personal information
- Full name: Julia Marie Benati
- Date of birth: September 18, 1996 (age 30)
- Place of birth: Dorchester, Ontario, Canada
- Height: 5 ft 2 in (1.57 m)
- Position: Midfielder

Team information
- Current team: Halifax Tides FC
- Number: 4

Youth career
- North London SC
- Dorchester SC
- NorWest London

College career
Years	Team	Apps	(Gls)
2014–2017	Buffalo Bulls	76	(18)

Senior career*
Years	Team	Apps	(Gls)
2016–2022	FC London	68	(26)
2022	Medkila	8	(2)
2023	Valadares Gaia	11	(0)
2023	Valadares Gaia B	2	(1)
2023–2024	FC London	26	(13)
2025	Ottawa Rapid	23	(3)
2026–	Halifax Tides FC	15	(4)
- * Club domestic league appearances and goals as of September 10, 2026

Julia Marie Benati (born September 18, 1996) is a Canadian professional soccer player who plays as a midfielder for Halifax Tides FC in the Northern Super League.

== Early life ==
Benati played youth soccer with North London SC, Dorchester SC, and NorWest London.

== College career ==
In 2014, Benati began attending the University of Buffalo, where she played for the women's soccer team. She scored her first goal in her debut on August 22, 2014, in a 1-0 victory over the St. Bonaventure Bonnies. At the end of her first season, she was named to the Mid-American Conference All-Freshman Team. At the end of her sophomore season, she was named to the All-MAC Second Team, earned Academic All-MAC honours and was named to the MAC Distinguished Scholar Athlete list. In 2016, she was once again named to the All-MAC Second Team and earned Academic All-MAC honours once again. At the end of her senior season, Benati was named to the All-MAC First Team, All-Midwest Region Third Team, Academic All-MAC, and Academic All-District. She was became the first Buffalo women's soccer student-athlete to receive the NCAA postgraduate scholarship and was nominated for the 2018 NCAA Woman Of The Year.

== Club career ==
In 2016, Benati began playing with FC London in League1 Ontario. In 2016, she was named to the mid-season league all-star team that played the PLSQ All-Star team and was named a league Second Team All-Star at the end of the season. In 2017, she was named a league Third Team All-Star. In 2018, she was named a league First Team All-Star. In 2019, Benati was named the league's Midfielder of the Year and a First Team All-Star. In 2021, she once again was named the league's Top Midfielder and a First Team All-Star. In 2022, she became team captain and at the end of the season was named the league Most Valuable Player, Midfielder of the Year, and a First Team All-Star.

In August 2022, Benati signed with Norwegian club Medkila in the top tier 1. divisjon.

In January 2023, she signed with Portuguese club Valadares Gaia in the Campeonato Nacional Feminino.

In June 2023, she returned to FC London, with her arrival delayed while she had to wait for the Portuguese Football Federation to approve her contract termination with Gaia. In 2024, she was again named the league Midfielder of the Year and a First Team All-Star.

In January 2025, Benati signed with Ottawa Rapid FC in the Northern Super League, becoming the club's first ever signing, ahead of their inaugural season. On May 15, 2025, she scored her first goal in a 3-0 victory over Vancouver Rise FC. She featured mainly as a substitute for the Rapid, scoring three goals and adding one assist, in 23 appearances.

On January 14, 2026, it was announced that Benati had signed with NSL side Halifax Tides FC for the 2026 season. On September 5, 2026, she scored from the midfield line in the fifth minute of stoppage time, to give her team a 1-0 victory over Vancouver Rise FC.

== Personal life ==
Benati is a licensed chiropractor, having studied at the Canadian Memorial Chiropractic College and becoming a Doctor of Chiropractic after her undergraduate studies. She stepped away from clinical practice after being offered a place with Ottawa Rapid in their inaugural season, saying "I love being a chiropractor, and I also want to compete at the highest level possible. You can’t live with regrets—sometimes you have to take the leap."

== Career statistics ==
As of November 8, 2025

Appearances and goals by club, season and competition
Club	Season	League			Playoffs		National cup		League cup		Total	
Club	Season	Division	Apps	Goals	Apps	Goals	Apps	Goals	Apps	Goals	Apps	Goals
FC London	2016	League1 Ontario	10	4	—		—		?	?	10	4
FC London	2017	League1 Ontario	8	1	—		—		?	?	8	1
FC London	2018	League1 Ontario	10	1	0	0	—		?	?	10	1
FC London	2019	League1 Ontario	13	5	5	0	—		—		18	5
FC London	2021	League1 Ontario	10	3	1	0	—		—		11	3
FC London	2022	League1 Ontario	17	12	1	0	—		—		18	12
FC London	Total		68	26	7	0	0	0	0	0	75	26
Medkila	2022	1. divisjon	8	2	—		0	0	—		8	2
Valadares Gaia	2022–23	Campeonato Nacional Feminino	11	0	—		0	0	—		11	0
Valadares Gaia B	2022–23	Campeonato Nacional II Divisão Feminino	2	1	—		—		—		2	1
FC London	2023	League1 Ontario	9	2	0	0	—		—		9	2
FC London	2024	League1 Ontario	17	11	—		—		4	4	21	15
FC London	Total		26	13	0	0	0	0	4	4	30	17
Ottawa Rapid FC	2025	Northern Super League	23	2	2	0	—		—		25	2
Career total			138	44	9	0	0	0	4	4	151	48

== Honours ==
=== Club ===
- FC London
  - League Champions: 2016, 2017, 2019
  - League Cup Champions: 2017, 2024

=== Individual ===
- L1O MVP: 2022
- L1O Midfielder of the Year: 2019, 2021, 2022, 2024
- L1O All-Star:
  - First Team: 2018, 2019, 2021, 2022, 2024
  - Second Team: 2016
  - Third Team: 2017
