= Caden Tomy =

Canadian soccer player (born 2001)

Personal information
- Full name: Caden Thomas Tomy
- Date of birth: 12 September 2001 (age 25)
- Place of birth: Winnipeg, Manitoba, Canada
- Position: Midfielder

Youth career
- Winnipeg South End United SC
- WSA Winnipeg

College career
Years	Team	Apps	(Gls)
2023–	Carleton Ravens	26	(4)

Senior career*
Years	Team	Apps	(Gls)
2021	Valour FC	4	(0)
2023	FC Manitoba	9	(0)
2026–	West Ottawa SC	1	(2)
- * Club domestic league appearances and goals as of April 20, 2026

Caden Thomas Tomy (born 12 September 2001) is a Canadian soccer player who plays for West Ottawa SC in LS Pro Ligue3.

== Early life ==
Tomy began playing youth soccer at age five with Winnipeg South End United SC, where he played for four years. Afterwards, he joined WSA Winnipeg, including being able to train with their Premier Development League squad when he turned 15. He later played for WSA Winnipeg at the senior amateur level in the Manitoba Major Soccer League. In 2018, Tomy attended the Canadian Premier League Open Trials, being invited back for the second day of trials.

== University career ==
In 2023, Tomy began attending Carleton University, where he played for the men's soccer team. In 2025, he was named an OUA East First Team All-Star and the team's MVP.

== Club career ==
In June 2021, Tomy trialed in pre-season with local Canadian Premier League side Valour FC. In September 2021, Tomy signed his first professional contract with Valour. After his contract expired after the season, he returned to trial with the club in their 2022 pre-season.

In August 2022, he went on trial with Spanish club SD Huesca B of the Tercera Federación.

In 2023, he played with FC Manitoba in USL League Two.

In 2026, he joined West Ottawa SC in LS Pro Ligue 3.
