= Melanie Forbes =

Canadian soccer player (born 1999)

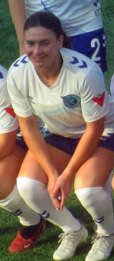
- Forbes in 2025

Personal information
- Full name: Melanie Claire Rendeiro Forbes
- Date of birth: June 21, 1999 (age 27)
- Place of birth: Santa Monica, California, United States
- Height: 5 ft 3 in (1.60 m)
- Position: Forward

Team information
- Current team: Ottawa Rapid FC

Youth career
- 2014–2015: Ontario REX
- 2015–2016: Scarborough GS United

College career
| Years | Team | Apps | (Gls) |
| 2017–2021 | Indiana Hoosiers | 85 | (9) |

Senior career*
| Years | Team | Apps | (Gls) |
| 2016 | Aurora United FC | 2 | (0) |
| 2018–2019 | DeRo United FC | 6 | (0) |
| 2019 | FC Pride | 3 | (1) |
| 2021 | Detroit City FC | | (7) |
| 2022–2023 | Damaiense | 29 | (4) |
| 2023–2024 | Keflavík | 30 | (7) |
| 2025– | Ottawa Rapid | 47 | (6) |
- * Club domestic league appearances and goals as of October 30, 2026

Melanie Claire Rendeiro Forbes (born June 21, 1999) is a soccer player who plays for Northern Super League club Ottawa Rapid.

== Early life ==
Forbes was born in the United States to an American father and Portuguese-born Canadian mother, moving to Mississauga, Canada when she was seven.

Forbes played with the Ontario provincial team from 2013 to 2015 and the Ontario REX program from 2014 to 2015. She also played with Scarborough GS United, also playing at the senior amateur level with them, helping them win the Jubilee Trophy as Canadian amateur champions. In 2017, she was named to the Team Ontario roster for the 2017 Canada Summer Games, where she won a silver medal.

== College career ==
In 2017, Forbes began attending Indiana University, where she played for the women's soccer team. On September 7, 2018, she scored her first collegiate goal in a 5-1 victory over the Kentucky Wildcats. At the end of her second season, she was named a Big Ten Conference Distinguished Scholar and named to the Academic All-Big Ten team. In 2019, she was named to the Academic All-District First Team, the Academic All-Big Ten Team, and named a Big Ten Distinguished Scholar. On February 28, 2021, she scored a brace in a 2-0 victory over the Iowa Hawkeyes, which earned her Big Ten Co-Offensive Player of the Week and Forbes Named TopDrawerSoccer’s Player of the Week honours. After completing her Bachelor of Science degree, she returned for a fifth year to play with the team and complete her Master of Science in Healthcare Management, with her completing her final semester of her master's in Portugal to enable her to also pursue professional soccer.

== Club career ==
In 2016, she played with Aurora United FC in League1 Ontario. In 2018 and 2019, she played with DeRo United FC. Later in 2019, she played with FC Pride in the Women's Premier Soccer League.

In 2021, she played with Detroit City FC in United Women's Soccer. She scored 7 goals that season and was named to the UWS All-Midwest Conference Second Team at the end of the season.

In February 2022, Forbes joined Portuguese club Damaiense. In April 2022, she was named to the league's Team of the Week.

In July 2023, she signed with Icelandic club Keflavík. On August 2, 2023, she scored her first goal for the club in a 1-1 draw with Stjarnan. On September 7, 2024, she scored a hat trick in a 4-4 draw with Stjarnan. After finishing as the team's top scorer in 2024, she was named the club's female player of the year.

Forbes joined Ottawa Rapid in January 2025, ahead of the inaugural Northern Super League season. Forbes recorded her first goal for the Rapid on June 21, 2025, coming off the bench on her birthday, also adding an assist in a 3-1 victory over Calgary Wild FC. On November 8, 2025, she scored in the second leg of the Rapid's aggregate 3–3 (5–4 on penalties) semifinal loss to Vancouver Rise FC in the inaugural NSL playoffs.

== Career statistics ==
As of October 30, 2026

Appearances and goals by club, season and competition
| Club | Season | League | | | Playoffs | | National cup | | League cup | | Total | |
| Club | Season | Division | Apps | Goals | Apps | Goals | Apps | Goals | Apps | Goals | Apps | Goals |
|---|---|---|---|---|---|---|---|---|---|---|---|---|
| Aurora United FC | 2016 | League1 Ontario | 2 | 0 | — | | — | | 0 | 0 | 2 | 0 |
| DeRo United FC | 2018 | League1 Ontario | 4 | 0 | — | | — | | | | 4 | 0 |
| DeRo United FC | 2019 | League1 Ontario | 2 | 0 | — | | — | | — | | 2 | 0 |
| DeRo United FC | Total | | 6 | 0 | 0 | 0 | 0 | 0 | 0 | 0 | 6 | 0 |
| FC Pride | 2019 | Women's Premier Soccer League | 3 | 1 | — | | — | | — | | 3 | 1 |
| Damaiense | 2021–22 | Campeonato Nacional II Divisão Feminino | 11 | 2 | — | | 0 | 0 | — | | 11 | 2 |
| Damaiense | 2022–23 | Campeonato Nacional Feminino | 18 | 2 | — | | 3 | 1 | 2 | 0 | 23 | 3 |
| Damaiense | Total | | 29 | 4 | 0 | 0 | 3 | 1 | 2 | 0 | 34 | 5 |
| Keflavík | 2023 | Besta deild kvenna | 9 | 2 | — | | 0 | 0 | 0 | 0 | 9 | 2 |
| Keflavík | 2024 | Besta deild kvenna | 21 | 5 | — | | 2 | 2 | 4 | 1 | 27 | 8 |
| Keflavík | Total | | 30 | 7 | 0 | 0 | 2 | 2 | 4 | 1 | 36 | 10 |
| Ottawa Rapid FC | 2025 | Northern Super League | 22 | 2 | 1 | 1 | — | | — | | 23 | 3 |
| Ottawa Rapid FC | 2026 | Northern Super League | 25 | 4 | 0 | 0 | — | | — | | 25 | 4 |
| Ottawa Rapid FC | Total | | 47 | 6 | 1 | 1 | 0 | 0 | 0 | 0 | 48 | 7 |
| Career total | | | 117 | 18 | 1 | 1 | 5 | 3 | 6 | 1 | 129 | 23 |
