= Mollie Eriksson =

Swedish footballer (born 2000)

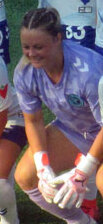
- Eriksson in 2025

Personal information
- Full name: Mollie Jae Eriksson
- Date of birth: July 23, 2000 (age 26)
- Place of birth: Stockholm, Sweden
- Height: 5 ft 7 in (1.70 m)
- Position: Goalkeeper

Team information
- Current team: Ottawa Rapid FC

Youth career
- West Hamilton SC
- Ottawa South United
- Ontario REX

College career
Years	Team	Apps	(Gls)
2018–2022	DePaul Blue Demons	75	(0)

Senior career*
Years	Team	Apps	(Gls)
2017–2018	West Ottawa SC	23	(0)
2019	Darby FC	9	(0)
2022–2024	North Mississauga SC	39	(0)
2025–	Ottawa Rapid FC	12	(0)

International career
2016	Sweden U16	5	(0)
2017	Sweden U17	3	(0)
- * Club domestic league appearances and goals as of October 30, 2026

Mollie Jae Eriksson (born July 23, 2000) is a Swedish footballer who plays for Ottawa Rapid FC in the Northern Super League.

== Early life ==
Born in Sweden, Eriksson moved to Canada (first in Montreal then Hamilton), where she began playing soccer at age four with West Hamilton SC. When she was eight years old, she moved to Ottawa. In Canada, she played with Ottawa South United, as well as with the Ontario provincial team. In 2016, she went back to Sweden and spent time with several local teams and had a training stint with Rosenborg. In 2017, she returned to Canada and joined the Ontario REX program. In 2017, she played with Team Ontario at the 2017 Canada Summer Games, winning a silver medal.

== College career ==
In 2018, Eriksson began attending DePaul University, where she played for the women's soccer team. During her first season, she was named the Big East Freshman of the Week on two occasions, and was named to the Big East All-Freshman Team at the end of the season. In her second season, she was named the Big East Goalkeeper of the Week once and named to the Big East Honor Roll once. She was also named to the Big East All-Academic Team multiple times over her five seasons.

== Club career ==
In 2017 and 2018, Eriksson played with West Ottawa SC in League1 Ontario.

In 2019, she played with Darby FC.

From 2022 to 2024, she played with North Mississauga SC. In both 2023 and 2024, she was named a league Second Team All-Star. She was also a finalist for the Goalkeeper of the Year award both years as well.

In January 2025, she signed with Ottawa Rapid FC in the Northern Super League. On May 11, 2025, Eriksson recorded her first NSL clean sheet, in a 0-0 draw against Calgary Wild FC. on July 24, 2025, it was announced that Eriksson had suffered a season-ending injury, having sustained a supraspinatus tear during Ottawa's 3-0 loss against AFC Toronto on July 10, 2025. In August 2025, she signed a contract extension with the Rapid through the 2027 season. She made her return from injury to play her first match of the 2026 season on May 29, 2026, making 3 saves in a 2-1 win over Halifax Tides FC.

== International career ==
Eriksson is eligible to represent both Sweden and Canada at international level.

In 2012, she represented Canada at the U12 Danone Nations Cup, one of two girls to make the team.

In 2016 and 2017, Eriksson played with the Sweden U16 and Sweden U17 teams, accruing eight caps. She was also called up to a camp with the Sweden U23.

She also attended camps with the Canada U17 and Canada U20 teams.

== Coaching career ==
While pursuing a PhD graduate degree in Psychology, Neuroscience and Behaviour at McMaster University, she served as an assistant coach with the women's soccer team from 2023-24.

== Career statistics ==
As of October 30, 2026

Club	Season	League			Playoffs		Domestic Cup		Other		Total	
Club	Season	Division	Apps	Goals	Apps	Goals	Apps	Goals	Apps	Goals	Apps	Goals
West Ottawa SC	2017	League1 Ontario	14	0	—		—		1	0	15	0
West Ottawa SC	2018	League1 Ontario	9	0	—		—		?	0	9	0
West Ottawa SC	Total		23	0	0	0	0	0	1	0	24	0
Darby FC	2019	League1 Ontario	7	0	0	0	—		—		7	0
North Mississauga SC	2022	League1 Ontario	9	0	—		—		—		9	0
North Mississauga SC	2023	League1 Ontario	15	0	—		—		—		15	0
North Mississauga SC	2024	League1 Ontario Premier	15	0	—		—		2 (Note: One appearance in League1 Ontario League Cup and one appearance in League1 Ontario Relegation playoffs)	0	17	0
North Mississauga SC	Total		39	0	0	0	0	0	2	0	41	0
Ottawa Rapid FC	2025	Northern Super League	8	0	0	0	—		—		8	0
Ottawa Rapid FC	2026	Northern Super League	4	0	0	0	—		—		4	0
Ottawa Rapid FC	Total		12	0	0	0	0	0	0	0	12	0
Career total			81	0	0	0	0	0	3	0	84	0
