= Stella Downing =

Canadian soccer player (born 2002)

- Downing in 2025

Personal information
- Full name: Stella Renaud Downing
- Date of birth: December 6, 2002 (age 23)
- Place of birth: Vancouver, British Columbia, Canada
- Height: 5 ft 2 in (1.57 m)
- Position: Midfielder

Team information
- Current team: Halifax Tides FC
- Number: 98

Youth career
- TSS FC Rovers
- Fusion FC
- 2015–2020: Vancouver Whitecaps

College career
Years	Team	Apps	(Gls)
2020–2021	Memphis Tigers	12	(0)
2021–2022	Ole Miss Rebels	41	(0)
2024	Creighton Bluejays	17	(3)

Senior career*
Years	Team	Apps	(Gls)
2022–2024	TSS FC Rovers	6+	(4+)
2025	Ottawa Rapid FC	22	(3)
2026–	Halifax Tides FC	0	(0)

International career
2018	Canada U17	1	(0)
- * Club domestic league appearances and goals as of October 17, 2025

Stella Renaud Downing (born December 6, 2002) is a Canadian soccer player who plays for Halifax Tides FC in the Northern Super League.

== Early life ==
Downing played youth soccer with TSS FC Rovers, Fusion FC, before joining the Whitecaps FC Girls Elite in September 2015.

== College career ==
In 2020, Downing began attending the University of Memphis, where she played for the women's soccer team. On February 4, 2021, she made her collegiate debut (the 2020 Fall season was delayed due to the COVID-19 pandemic) against the UAB Blazers.

In 2021, she transferred to the University of Mississippi to play for the women's soccer team. She earned SEC Academic Honor Roll and Dean’s List honours in both 2021 and 2022.

In 2023, Downing transferred to Creighton University to join the women's soccer team, but had to sit out the 2023 season due to transfer rules. On October 6, 2024, she scored her first goals in a 2-1 victory over the UConn Huskies, which earned her Big East Conference Offensive Player of the Week honours. At the end of the season, she was named to the All-Big East Second Team.

== Club career ==
In 2022, she began playing with TSS FC Rovers in League1 British Columbia.

In January 2025, Downing signed with Northern Super League club Ottawa Rapid FC. On June 7, 2025, she scored her first goal in a 4-0 victory over AFC Toronto. She scored three goals and added two assists across 23 matches in all competitions.

In December 2025, she signed with fellow Northern Super League club Halifax Tides FC.

== International career ==
Downing made her debut in the Canada national program in 2017 at a training camp with the Canada U17. She earned her first international cap at the 2018 CONCACAF Women's U-17 Championship against the United States U17.
