= West Ottawa SC =

Canadian soccer team

- Full name: West Ottawa Soccer Club
- Nickname: WOSC Warriors
- Founded: 2010
- President: Nick Covelli
- Executive Director: Jessie Burgins
- League: Ligue2 Québec
- Website: http://www.wosc.com

West Ottawa Soccer Club is a Canadian soccer club based in Kanata, Ontario that plays in Ligue2 Québec. They previously competed in the women's division of League1 Ontario. The club also operates as a full service youth club. It is one of the largest soccer clubs in Canada.

== History ==
The club was founded in 2010 as a youth soccer club when local clubs Goulbourn Soccer Club and Kanata Soccer Club decided to merge to form the West Ottawa Soccer Club.

The club is an original member of the Ontario Player Development League (OPDL), the highest level of competitive youth soccer in Ontario, since 2014.

The club joined the women's division of League1 Ontario for the 2017 season becoming the first team in the league from Ottawa. They played their first match against Vaughan Azzurri losing 2-1. They left the league following the 2018 season.

In 2017, the club formed a partnership with Major League Soccer club Montreal Impact’s Academy, becoming the first club from Ontario to partner with them.

In 2023, the men's senior team won the Challenge Trophy (the Canadian national amateur title).

In December 2025, the club announced that they would join the semi-professional Ligue3 Québec of LS Pro for the 2026 season in both the men's and women's divisions. In their inaugural match, the men's team defeated AS Notre-Dame-de-Grâce, by a score of 10-0. Both the men's and women's teams won the Ligue3 championship and were promoted to Ligue2 Québec for the 2027 season.

== League1 Ontario Seasons ==
Women

Season	League	Teams	Record	Rank	Playoffs	League Cup	Ref
2017	League1 Ontario	11	9–1–10	8th	–	Semi-finals	
2018	League1 Ontario	13	3–1–8	10th	Did not qualify	Round of 16	

== Notable former players ==
The following players have either played at the professional or international level, either before or after playing for the League1 Ontario or Ligue3 Quebec team:

Men

- (Canada) Myles Cornwall
- (Canada) Jason Hartill
- (Canada) Caden Tomy

Women

- (Canada) Emily Amano
- (Sweden) (Canada) Mollie Eriksson
- (Canada) Vanessa Gilles
- (Canada) Kristina Kiss
- (Canada) Clarissa Larisey
- (Canada) Keera Melenhorst
- (Canada) Miranda Smith
