= Hailey Whitaker =

American soccer player (born 2000)

Personal information
- Full name: Hailey Allende Whitaker
- Date of birth: February 24, 2000 (age 26)
- Place of birth: Birmingham, Alabama, United States
- Height: 5 ft 1 in (1.55 m)
- Position: Right-back

Team information
- Current team: Montreal Roses
- Number: 3

Youth career
- Alabama FC

College career
Years	Team	Apps	(Gls)
2018–2022	Auburn Tigers	94	(8)

Senior career*
Years	Team	Apps	(Gls)
2023	Åland United	14	(0)
2023–2024	Valur	23	(1)
2025–	Montreal Roses	24	(1)
- * Club domestic league appearances and goals as of October 20, 2025

Hailey Allende Whitaker (born February 24, 2000) is an American soccer player who plays for Montreal Roses FC in the Northern Super League.

== Early life ==
Whitaker played youth soccer with Alabama FC.

== College career ==
In 2018, Whitaker began attending Auburn University, where she played for the women's soccer team. On August 26, 2018, she scored her first collegiate goal in a victory over the Louisiana Ragin' Cajuns. At the end of the season, she was named the team's Rookie of the Year. In April 2021, during her junior season, she was named the Southeastern Conference Co-Offensive Player of the Week, and was also twice named to the TopDrawerSoccer Team of the Week. Over five seasons with Auburn, she played over 6,500 minutes in 94 matches, the second-highest total in program history. She was named to the SEC Academic Honor Roll all five years, and also was selected as a CoSIDA Academic All-District in 2021 and a CSC Academic All-District in 2022.

== Club career ==
In January 2023, she signed with Finnish club Åland United in the Kansallinen Liiga.

In January 2024, she signed with Icelandic club Valur in the first tier Besta deild kvenna.

In February 2025, she signed with Canadian club Montreal Roses FC in the Northern Super League. In November 2025, she extended her contract for an additional season.
