= Kayla Adamek =

Canadian-Polish footballer (born 1995)

Personal information
- Full name: Kayla Joan Zophia Adamek
- Date of birth: 1 February 1995 (age 31)
- Place of birth: Ottawa, Canada
- Height: 1.67 m (5 ft 6 in)
- Position: Defender

Team information
- Current team: Ottawa Rapid

College career
Years	Team	Apps	(Gls)
2013–2017	UCF Knights		

Senior career*
Years	Team	Apps	(Gls)
2013	Ottawa Fury		
2019	Spartak Subotica		
2020	Granadilla B	3	(1)
2020–2021	Granadilla	30	(2)
2022–2024	Vittsjö GIK	52	(6)
2024–2025	Reims	9	(0)
2025–	Ottawa Rapid	42	(1)

International career^{‡}
2022–	Poland	23	(2)
- * Club domestic league appearances and goals as of 30 October 2026 ‡ National team caps and goals as of 4 July 2025

Kayla Joan Zophia Adamek (born 1 February 1995) is a professional footballer who plays as a Defender for Northern Super League club Ottawa Rapid. Born in Canada, she plays for the Poland national team.

== Early life ==
Adamek grew up in Nepean, Ontario, Canada.

== College career ==
In 2013, Adamek joined UCF Knights in the United States, where she captained the team and was regarded as one of their most important players. She was named the American Athletic Conference (AAC) Midfielder of the Year in 2017 and has been regarded as one of the best female athletes to play for UCF Knights.

== Club career ==
Adamek started her career with Canadian side Ottawa Fury. After that, she signed for Serbian side ŽFK Spartak Subotica, where she played in the UEFA Women's Champions League. In 2019, she signed for Spanish side Granadilla, where she was regarded as one of the reserve team's most important players before being promoted to the first team. She was described as "showing quality... being an offensive alternative" for the first team. In 2022, she signed for Swedish side Vittsjö GIK.

On 16 May 2025, Adamek signed with Ottawa Rapid FC. She started in the club's inaugural match, a 2–1 victory over AFC Toronto.

== International career ==
Adamek plays for the Poland national team.

== Style of play ==
Adamek mainly operates as a midfielder, winger, or striker and is known for her ability to create goalscoring opportunities. Her versatility has also seen her play as a defender with Ottawa Rapid.

== Personal life ==
Adamek has Polish grandparents. She is part of the LGBT community. On 8 October 2020, Adamek was announced as an Athlete Ally ambassador.

== Career statistics ==
=== International ===
As of match played 4 July 2025

Appearances and goals by national team and year
National team	Year	Apps	Goals
Poland
Poland	2022	3	0
Poland	2023	8	0
Poland	2024	8	1
Poland	2025	4	1
Total		23	2

Scores and results list Poland's goal tally first, score column indicates score after each Adamek goal.

List of international goals scored by Kayla Adamek
No.	Date	Venue	Opponent	Score	Result	Competition
1	23 February 2024	Marbella Football Center, Marbella, Spain	Switzerland	1–2	1–4	Friendly
2	27 June 2025	Stadion Stali Mielec, Mielec, Poland	Ukraine	3–0	4–0	Friendly
