= Tanya Boychuk =

Ukrainian footballer (born 2000)

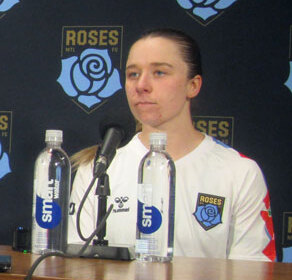
- Boychuk in 2025

Personal information
- Full name: Tanya Laryssa Boychuk
- Date of birth: June 20, 2000 (age 26)
- Place of birth: Edmonton, Alberta, Canada
- Height: 1.70 m (5 ft 7 in)
- Position: Forward

Team information
- Current team: Montreal Roses
- Number: 12

Youth career
- McLeod Community League
- Edmonton Xtreme FC
- Internazionale SC of Edmonton
- FC Edmonton REX
- Vancouver Whitecaps REX

College career
Years	Team	Apps	(Gls)
2018–2021	Memphis Tigers	74	(21)

Senior career*
Years	Team	Apps	(Gls)
2018	TSS FC Rovers		
2019	Calgary Foothills	7	(8)
2021–2022	St. Albert Impact		
2023	Þróttur	23	(6)
2024	Vittsjö GIK	25	(7)
2025–	Montreal Roses	22	(6)

International career^{‡}
2019	Canada U18	2	(1)
2018–2020	Canada U20	8	(5)
2026–	Ukraine	5	(1)
- * Club domestic league appearances and goals as of October 20, 2025 ‡ National team caps and goals as of October 9, 2026

Tanya Laryssa Boychuk (Ukrainian: Таня Лариса Бойчук; (Note: Her full name, according to Ukrainian documents, is Tanya Volodymyrivna Boychuk (Ukrainian: Таня Володимирівна Бойчук)) born June 20, 2000) is a professional footballer who plays as a forward for Northern Super League club Montreal Roses FC. Born in Canada, she plays for the Ukraine national team.

== Early life ==
Boychuk was born in Edmonton, Alberta to Ukrainian parents. Her first language is Ukrainian, though she also speaks English and French.

Boychuk began playing youth soccer with the McLeod Community League when she was four years old, later playing with FC Xtreme, Internazionale SC of Edmonton, and the FC Edmonton REX Program. She later joined the Vancouver Whitecaps REX program.

In her youth, Boychuk participated in both soccer and diving. In diving, she won a bronze medal with Canada at the 2015 Junior Pan American Games in the 1 metre dive and a bronze medal at the 2015 Junior Pan American Games in 3 metre syncro diving with partner Elaena Dick. She was selected to the Team Alberta teams for the 2017 Canada Summer Games for both soccer and diving, however, she opted to participate in soccer with both sports competitions occurring at the same time.

== College career ==
In 2018, Boychuk began attending the University of Memphis, where she played for the women's soccer team. On September 20, 2018, she scored her first collegiate goal in a victory over the Cincinnati Bearcats. In October 2018, she was named the AAC Rookie of the Week and at the end of the season was named to the AAC All-Rookie Team.

In 2019, she was named to the All-AAC Second Team. In her third season, she was named the AAC Offensive Player of the Week in March 2021, and named to the All-AAC First Team, the All-South Region First Team, and a Second Team All-American.

Ahead of her senior year, she was named to the AAC All-Preseason Team. She was named the AAC Offensive Player of the Week in October 2021 and was named to the All-AAC First Team. Over her four years, she was named to the Dean's List and Academic Honour Roll every semester and was named to the AAC All-Academic team three times from 2019 to 2021. She was also named a Second Team Scholar All-American in 2021.

== Club career ==
In 2018, she played with TSS FC Rovers in the Women's Premier Soccer League.

In 2019, she played with Calgary Foothills WFC in United Women's Soccer. At the end of the season, she was named to the All-UWS Third Team.

In 2021, she began playing with the St. Albert Impact in United Women's Soccer.

In April 2023, she signed with Icelandic club Þróttur in the Besta deild kvenna.

In 2024, she signed with Vittsjö GIK in the Swedish Damallsvenskan. In December 2024, the club announced that she would be departing the club as she had transferred her to another club for a fee.

In December 2024, Boychuk signed with Montreal Roses FC ahead of the first-ever Northern Super League season. On April 19, 2025, she scored the first goal in franchise history, scoring in the second minute, in a 1–0 victory over AFC Toronto, in the club's inaugural match. On May 3, 2025, Boychuk scored the winning goal in a 2–1 victory over Ottawa Rapid FC. On June 14, 2025, Tanya Boychuk scored her 3rd goal for Montreal Roses FC and another game-winning goal in their 2–1 win against Ottawa Rapid FC.

== International career ==
Tanya Boychuk was born in Canada to a Ukrainian-born father, Vlodko (Volodymyr) Boychuk and a Canadian-born mother of Ukrainian descent, Orysia Boychuk (née Yakymchuk).

=== Canada ===
In February 2017, she debuted in the Canada Soccer program, attending a camp with the Canada U20. She was later called up to the U20 team for a three nations tournament in Australia in July 2017, the 2018 CONCACAF Women's U-20 Championship, and the 2020 CONCACAF Women's U-20 Championship. She scored 5 goals in 8 matches, across both tournaments. She had also been called up to the Canada U18 in July 2019 for a pair of friendlies against England U18. In 2020, she was nominated for the Canada Soccer Young Player of the Year award.

In February 2022, she was called up to the Canada senior team for the first time for the 2022 Arnold Clark Cup.

=== Ukraine ===
In June 2025, Boychuk was called up to the Ukrainian senior national team for a camp in Poland. In November 2025, she was called up to the squad again, ahead of a friendly series.

On 11 March 2026, Boychuk officially received approval from FIFA to switch her international allegiance from Canada to Ukraine.

=== International goals ===
No.	Date	Venue	Opponent	Score	Result	Competition
1.	9 October 2026	Futbal Tatran Arena, Prešov, Slovakia	Slovakia	3–1	3–1	2027 FIFA Women's World Cup qualification play-offs
