= Olivia Scott =

Canadian soccer player (born 2001)

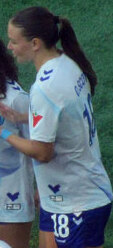
- Scott in 2025

Personal information
- Full name: Olivia Elizabeth Scott
- Date of birth: March 23, 2001 (age 25)
- Place of birth: Aurora, Ontario, Canada
- Height: 1.70 m (5 ft 7 in)
- Position: Defender

Team information
- Current team: Ottawa Rapid FC

Youth career
- 2010–2017: Aurora FC
- Ontario REX

College career
Years	Team	Apps	(Gls)
2019–2023	Quinnipiac Bobcats	83	(12)

Senior career*
Years	Team	Apps	(Gls)
2017	Aurora FC	3	(0)
2019	Aurora FC	3	(0)
2025–	Ottawa Rapid FC	41	(3)

International career
2016	Canada U15		
2017	Canada U17		
- * Club domestic league appearances and goals as of October 30, 2026

Olivia Elizabeth Scott (born March 23, 2001) is a Canadian soccer player who plays for Ottawa Rapid FC in the Northern Super League.

== Early life ==
Scott played youth soccer with Aurora FC and the Ontario REX program. She also played for Team Ontario at the 2017 Canada Summer Games, winning a silver medal.

== College career ==
In 2019, Scott began attending Quinnipiac University, where she played for the women's soccer team. On September 1, 2019, she scored her first collegiate goal and added two assists in a 3-1 victory over the Loyola Greyhounds, earning MAAC Rookie of the Week. She again earned MAAC Rookie of the Week honours in October, and was later named to the MAAC All-Rookie Team at the end of the season. In 2022, she was named to the All-MAAC First Team, the MAAC All-Championship Team, and the All-Atlantic Third Team. In 2023, she was again named to the All-MAAC First Team and the MAAC All-Championship Team.

== Club career ==
In 2017 and 2019, Scott played with Aurora FC in League1 Ontario.

In January 2025, she signed with Ottawa Rapid FC in the Northern Super League. She was named a team co-captain for the team in 2025. On June 10, 2025, Scott scored her first goal for the club in the 15th minute of a 2-1 loss against Halifax Tides FC. On June 14, 2025, Scott received the league's first red card in the 26th minute for denying an obvious goal-scoring opportunity, in a 2-1 defeat against the Montreal Roses. On July 25, 2025, she scored the winning goal, in a 1-0 victory over Halifax Tides FC. On August 25, 2025, it was announced that she had signed a contract extension with the Rapid through the 2027 season, with Scott saying “It just felt right. It wasn't a question of if I was staying, it was just about when we'd make it official." At the end of the season, she was named to the league's Team of the Season.

== International career ==
Scott played with the Canada U15 at the 2016 CONCACAF Girls' U-15 Championship and was named to the Canada U17 for a Four Nations U17 Tournament in China in 2017.
