= Johanne Fridlund =

Norwegian footballer (born 1996)

Personal information
- Date of birth: 24 July 1996 (age 30)
- Place of birth: Stavern, Norway
- Position: Forward

Team information
- Current team: Ottawa Rapid

Senior career*
| Years | Team | Apps | (Gls) |
| 2012 | Eik Tønsberg | 11 | (1) |
| 2013 | Nanset | 13 | (7) |
| 2014–2017 | Vålerenga | 64 | (7) |
| 2015–2017 | Vålerenga 2 | 6 | (2) |
| 2017–2019 | Grei | 26 | (5) |
| 2017–2019 | Grei 2 | 2 | (5) |
| 2020–2021 | Kolbotn | 31 | (8) |
| 2022 | Lazio | 10 | (1) |
| 2022 | Grei | 8 | (3) |
| 2023–2024 | Kolbotn | 51 | (13) |
| 2025– | Ottawa Rapid | 42 | (5) |

International career^{‡}
| 2011 | Norway U15 | 4 | (0) |
| 2012 | Norway U16 | 5 | (0) |
| 2014–2015 | Norway U19 | 21 | (4) |
| 2016 | Norway U23 | 5 | (1) |
- * Club domestic league appearances and goals as of 30 October 2026 ‡ National team caps and goals as of 22 January 2025

Johanne Fridlund (born 24 July 1996) is a Norwegian professional footballer who plays as a forward for Canadian club Ottawa Rapid. In 2022 she was called up to the Norway national team.

== Club career ==
She hails from Stavern. Fridlund started her senior career with Norwegian third tier side EIK. Before the 2014 season, she signed for Vålerenga in the Norwegian top flight, but left due to lack of motivation. Before the 2019 season, Fridlund signed for Norwegian second-tier club Grei. Before the 2020 season, she signed for Kolbotn in the Norwegian top flight. Before the second half of 2021–22, she signed for Italian team Lazio.

On 22 January 2025, Fridlund signed with Canadian side Ottawa Rapid FC in the newly-launched Northern Super League. On 15 October 2025, she scored her first goal for the Rapid on the final day of the inaugural regular season for the team, a 2–1 away win against Halifax Tides FC.

== International career ==
She was a youth international, especially with Norway U19.
