= Colby Barnett =

American soccer player (born 2003)

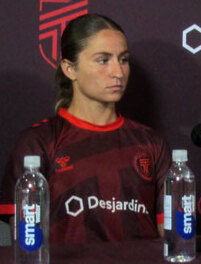
- Barnett in 2025

Personal information
- Full name: Colby Lynn Barnett
- Date of birth: February 13, 2003 (age 23)
- Place of birth: Los Alamitos, California, United States
- Height: 5 ft 3 in (1.60 m)
- Position: Midfielder

Team information
- Current team: AFC Toronto
- Number: 31

Youth career
- 2017–2018: Strikers FC
- 2018–2020: Southern California Blues SC

College career
Years	Team	Apps	(Gls)
2021–2024	Santa Clara Broncos	82	(6)

Senior career*
Years	Team	Apps	(Gls)
2025–	AFC Toronto	48	(2)
- * Club domestic league appearances and goals as of October 28, 2026

Colby Lynn Barnett (born February 13, 2003) is an American soccer player who plays as a midfielder for AFC Toronto in the Northern Super League. She played college soccer for the Santa Clara Broncos.

== Early life ==
Barnett played club soccer for Strikers FC from 2017 to 2018 and for Blues SC from 2018 to 2020.

== College career ==
In 2021, Barnett began attending Santa Clara University, where she played for the women's soccer team. She made her collegiate debut on August 19, 2021 against the San Jose State Spartans. At the end of her first season, she was named to the West Coast Conference All-Freshman Team. In 2022, she was named to the All-WCC Second Team and All-West Region Second Team. In 2023, she was named to the All-ECC Second Team, the All-West Region First Team and was a WCC All-Academic honorable mention.

Ahead of her senior season in 2024, Barnett was named to the WCC All-Preseason Team and was named to the MAC Hermann Trophy Watch List. At the end of the season, she was named to the WCC All-First Team, WCC All-Academic Team, and All-West Region First Team. Over her four seasons with Santa Clara, she scored six goals while adding 20 assists, in 82 appearances.

== Club career ==
In January 2025, Barnett signed with Northern Super League club AFC Toronto. On May 17, 2025, she scored her first NSL goal, in a 1-0 victory over Halifax Tides FC. In July 2025, she signed an extension with the club through the 2027 season. At the end of the 2025 season, she was named to the league's Team of the Season.

== International career ==
Barnett attended six training camps with the United States U15.
