= Florence Belzile =

Canadian soccer player (born 2003)

Personal information
- Date of birth: April 9, 2003 (age 23)
- Place of birth: Chicoutimi, Québec, Canada
- Height: 5 ft 8 in (1.73 m)
- Position: Midfielder

Team information
- Current team: Ottawa Rapid FC
- Number: 10

Youth career
- Bonivital SC
- 2016–2018: Cumberland United SC
- 2019: Ottawa TFC
- 2019: Ottawa Fury
- 2019: Ottawa South United
- 2019–2021: Ontario REX

College career
Years	Team	Apps	(Gls)
2021–2024	Nebraska Cornhuskers	73	(8)

Senior career*
Years	Team	Apps	(Gls)
2019	Ottawa South United	3	(0)
2021–2022	CS St-Hubert	14	(1)
2025–	Ottawa Rapid FC	42	(7)

International career
2019	Canada U17	1	(0)
- * Club domestic league appearances and goals as of October 30, 2026

Florence Belzile (born April 9, 2003) is a Canadian soccer player who plays for Ottawa Rapid FC in the Northern Super League.

== Early life ==
Originally, from Quebec, Belzile moved various times during her youth, due to her father's job in the military, living in Chicoutimi, Quebec, Florida, Winnipeg, Colorado, and Ottawa. In Winnipeg, where she lived until age 11, she played with Bonivital SC. After moving to Ottawa, she played youth soccer with Cumberland United SC (later merged to form Ottawa TFC), Ottawa Fury FC, and Ottawa South United. In 2019, she joined the Ontario REX program.

== College career ==
In 2021, Belzile began attending the University of Nebraska–Lincoln, where she played for the women's soccer team. On October 20, 2022, she scored a brace in a 4-2 victory over the Penn State Nittany Lions. In 2023, she was named to the TopDrawerSoccer Team of the Week three times. Ahead of the 2024 season, she was named a Big Ten Conference Player to Watch. Over her four years at Nebraska, she was named an Academic All-Big 10 three times and won the Tom Osborne Citizenship Team three times; both from 2022 to 2024.

== Club career ==
In 2019, she played with Ottawa South United in League1 Ontario.

In January 2025, Belzile signed with Northern Super League club Ottawa Rapid FC. On May 25, 2025, after having been away from the club due to completing her university exams, she made her debut for the team, in a substitute appearance against Montreal Roses FC. On July 19, 2025, she scored her first goal in a 3-0 victory over Calgary Wild FC. On September 13, 2025, she scored her third goal for the Rapid, an equalizer in the 47th minute of a 1-1 draw against Halifax Tides FC.

== International career ==
In November 2019, Belzile was called up to a camp in Mexico with the Canada U17 team, where she earned her first cap in a friendly.

== Personal life ==
Belzile is in a relationship with fellow soccer player Maxime Filion.
