= Emily Amano =

Canadian soccer player (born 2000)

Personal information
- Full name: Emily Maria Amano
- Date of birth: August 28, 2000 (age 26)
- Place of birth: Ottawa, Ontario, Canada
- Height: 5 ft 4 in (1.63 m)
- Position: Midfielder

Team information
- Current team: Ottawa Rapid FC

Youth career
- 2009–2017: Ottawa South United
- 2018: Ontario REX

College career
Years	Team	Apps	(Gls)
2018–2022	Colgate Raiders	70	(8)

Senior career*
Years	Team	Apps	(Gls)
2018	West Ottawa SC	3	(1)
2019	Ottawa South United	6	(1)
2021	Ottawa South United	5	(1)
2023	Umeå	22	(2)
2024	Grótta		
2025–	Ottawa Rapid	10	(0)
- * Club domestic league appearances and goals as of October 30, 2026

Emily Maria Amano (born August 28, 2000) is a Canadian soccer player who plays for Northern Super League club Ottawa Rapid FC.

== Early life ==
Amano played youth soccer with Ottawa South United from U9 to U17 level, when she then joined the Ontario REX program. She also played with the Ontario provincial team for four years. In 2017, she played with Team Ontario at the 2017 Canada Summer Games and was named to the tournament All-Star Team.

== College career ==
In 2018, Amano began attending Colgate University, where she played for the women's soccer team. She scored her first collegiate goal on August 26, 2018, in a 2-0 victory over the Albany Great Danes. In 2022, she was named to the All-Patriot League Third Team and the Patriot League All-Academic Team.

== Club career ==
In 2018, Amano played with West Ottawa SC in League1 Ontario. In 2019, she played with Ottawa South United in League1 Ontario. In 2021, she played with Ottawa South United in the Première ligue de soccer du Québec.

In April 2023, Amano signed with Swedish club Umeå in the first tier Damallsvenskan. In August 2023, she extended her contract for the remainder of the season. After the 2023 season, she departed the club.

In February 2024, she signed with Icelandic club Grótta in the second tier 1. deild kvenna.

In 2025, she returned to Canada and signed with Northern Super League club Ottawa Rapid FC. On December 27, 2025, it was announced that she had extended her contract to stay with the Rapid through 2026. Speaking about Amano's extension, Rapid technical director Kristina Kiss said “We didn’t get to see what she was capable of last season due to injury. I’m thrilled we’ll have the chance to see her in full form this season and can’t wait to see what she brings to the pitch.”
