= Susanne Haaland =

Norwegian footballer (born 1998)

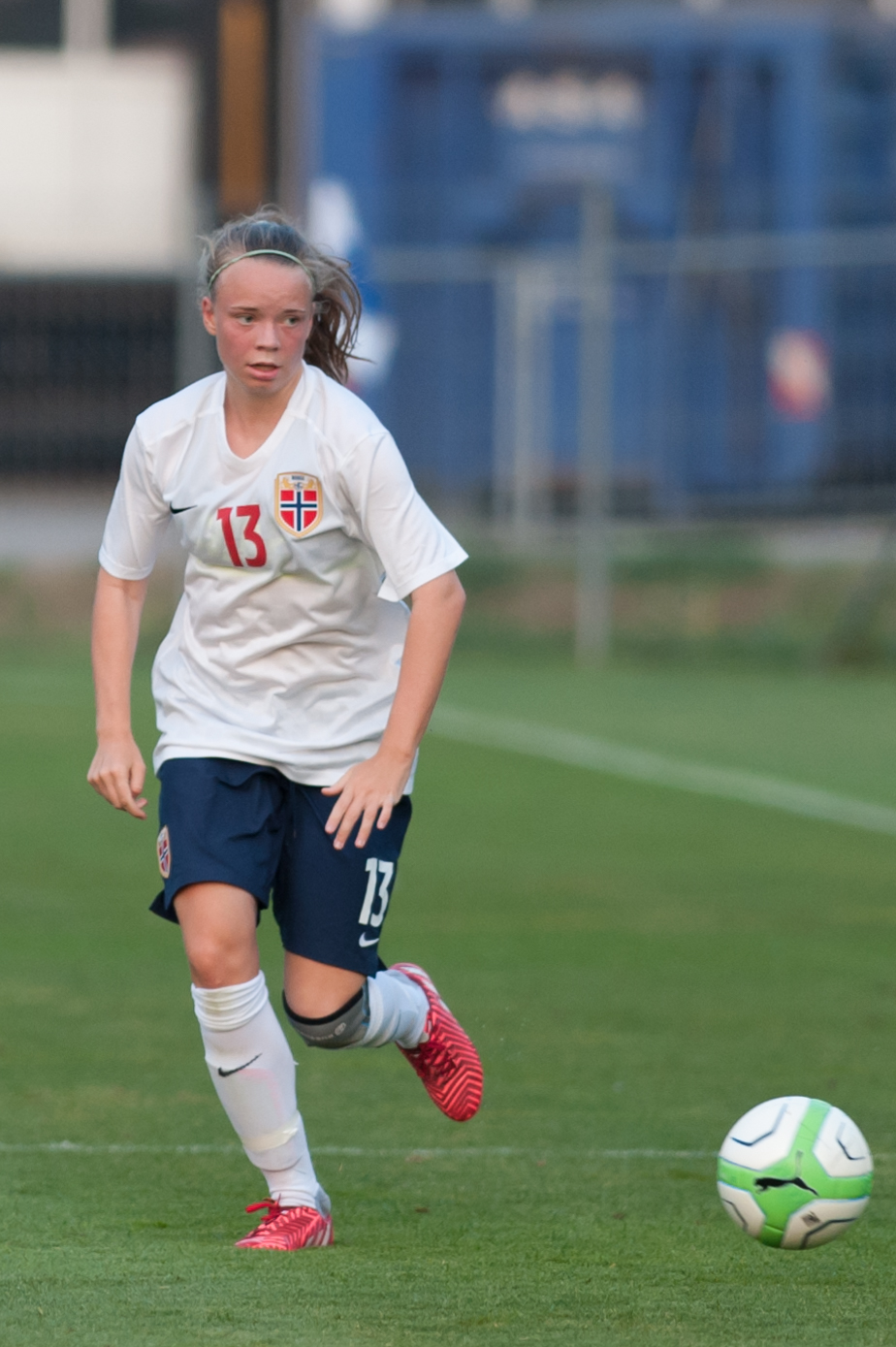
- Haaland with Norway U19 in 2015

Personal information
- Full name: Susanne Oliver Haaland
- Date of birth: 15 January 1998 (age 28)
- Place of birth: Asker, Norway
- Position: Defender

Team information
- Current team: Ottawa Rapid FC

Youth career
- Holmen
- 2013–2016: Stabæk

Senior career*
Years	Team	Apps	(Gls)
2014–2016	Stabæk 2	47	(7)
2015–2016	Stabæk	2	(0)
2017–2020	Øvrevoll Hosle	67	(3)
2019	Øvrevoll Hosle 2	1	(0)
2021–2024	Kolbotn	52	(2)
2024	Kolbotn 2	1	(0)
2025–	Ottawa Rapid FC	27	(0)

International career^{‡}
2013	Norway U15	3	(0)
2015	Norway U17	6	(0)
2015	Norway U19	1	(0)
- * Club domestic league appearances and goals as of 30 October 2026 ‡ National team caps and goals as of 12 August 2015

Susanne Oliver Haaland (born 15 January 1998) is a Norwegian footballer who plays for Ottawa Rapid FC in the Northern Super League.

== Early life ==
Haaland played youth football with Holmen IF, before joining Stabæk in August 2013.

== Club career ==
Haaland debuted at the highest level with the Stabæk first team, at the age of seventeen.

In 2017, she joined Øvrevoll Hosle in the second tier.

In March 2021, she signed with Kolbotn in the Toppserien. She served as the club's captain in 2023 and 2024. In December 2023, after helping the club earn promotion back to the top tier for 2024, she re-signed for the 2024 season. In early 2024, she suffered an injury requiring surgery, forcing her to miss the spring portion of the 2024 season. She departed the club after the 2024 season.

In January 2025, she signed with Canadian club Ottawa Rapid FC of the Northern Super League.

== International career ==
Haaland has represented Norway at the U15, U17, and U19 levels.

== Personal life ==
Haaland is not related to the family of Alf-Inge and Erling Haaland. She earned a master's degree in law from the University of Oslo in 2023, and has been working part-time with a think tank, with her focus being primarily on environmental issues and legal and human rights.
