= Ottawa Rapid FC =

Women's soccer club in Ottawa, Ontario

- Founded: 2024
- Stadium: TD Place Stadium; Ottawa, Ontario
- Capacity: 24,000
- Owners: Thomas Gilbert; Diana Matheson; Arcadia MapleLeaf Soccer
- Coach: Katrine Pedersen
- League: Northern Super League
- 2026: Regular season, 2nd Playoffs, semi-finalist
- Website: rapidfc.ca

Ottawa Rapid FC (French: CF Rapide Ottawa) is a professional women's soccer club based in Ottawa, Ontario. It competes in the Northern Super League, the highest level of the Canadian soccer league system. The club plays its home matches at the 24,000-capacity TD Place Stadium in Lansdowne Park. One of the last two clubs to join as charter members of the league, the Rapid played its inaugural season in 2025. The club's primary colour is light blue, with an orange accent, while its crest depicts the native peregrine falcon. Thomas Gilbert serves as the club's chief executive officer.

== History ==
The Rapid were the last to be planned of the original six clubs in the NSL. With the league struggling to reach six franchises signing-on by the spring 2024 deadline which had been set by the other franchise owners, league CEO Diana Matheson and co-founder Thomas Gilbert leveraged their equity in the league in order to create a club in Ottawa. The club's existence was first disseminated at the espnW Summit in May 2024, where it and Montréal were described as the last two of the league's six charter clubs. Details were initially scant, with Matheson implying its development was behind the other five clubs. The club's formal unveiling took place at a press conference at TD Place Stadium on August 15, where their corporate leadership, branding, and venue were detailed for the first time.

On September 17, 2025, following a 2–1 win over Calgary Wild FC, the Rapid secured a spot in the inaugural NSL playoffs. Ottawa was eliminated in the semifinal by Vancouver Rise FC.

On March 6, 2026, it was announced that Arcadia MapleLeaf Soccer had become majority owners of the Rapid, increasing investment into the club, and with Nick Sakellariadis being named as Chair.

== Identity ==
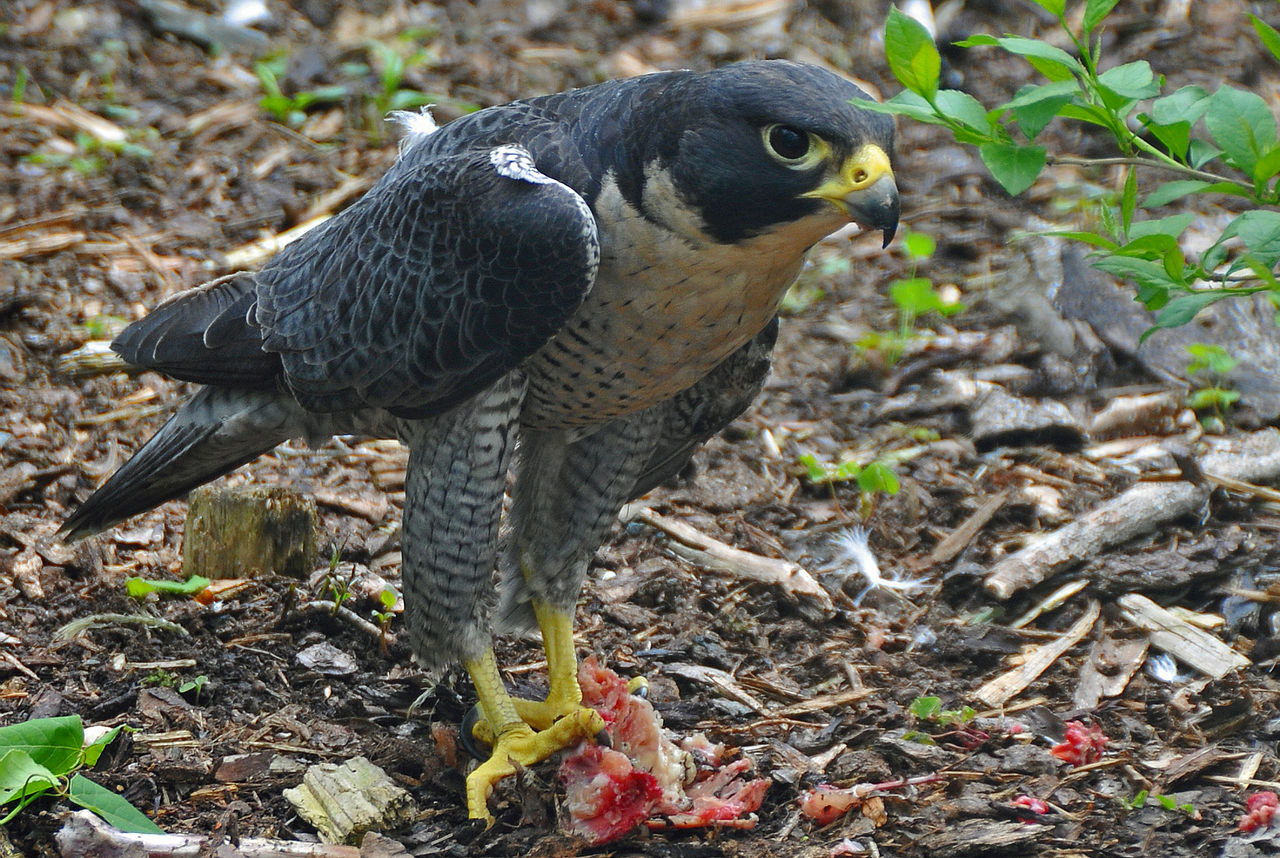
Native to Ottawa, the club's crest depicts the peregrine falcon, the fastest animal in the world.

Canadian advertising agency Critical Mass designed the club's branding, which uses light blue as a primary colour and orange as an accent – references to the "water, sky, and the power of nature around us", and the Centennial Flame on Parliament Hill, respectively. The club's name, Rapid, was a compromise between traditional North American "mascot" names, viscerality, and geographical context. The geology of the Ottawa Valley, and a "sense of speed and progress", were described by the club as imagery intended to be evoked by the name. While Ottawa is not officially bilingual, the club has an official French-language name: CF Rapide Ottawa, or Club de Foot Rapide Ottawa.

The Rapid's crest features the peregrine falcon, a bird native to Ottawa recognized as the fastest animal in the world, with a four-feathered wing representing the rivers Gatineau, Ottawa, and Rideau in its negative space. The letter "O" outlines the crest, and is decorated with a small tulip on its top – a reference to the Canadian Tulip Festival that takes place annually in Ottawa.

== Stadium ==
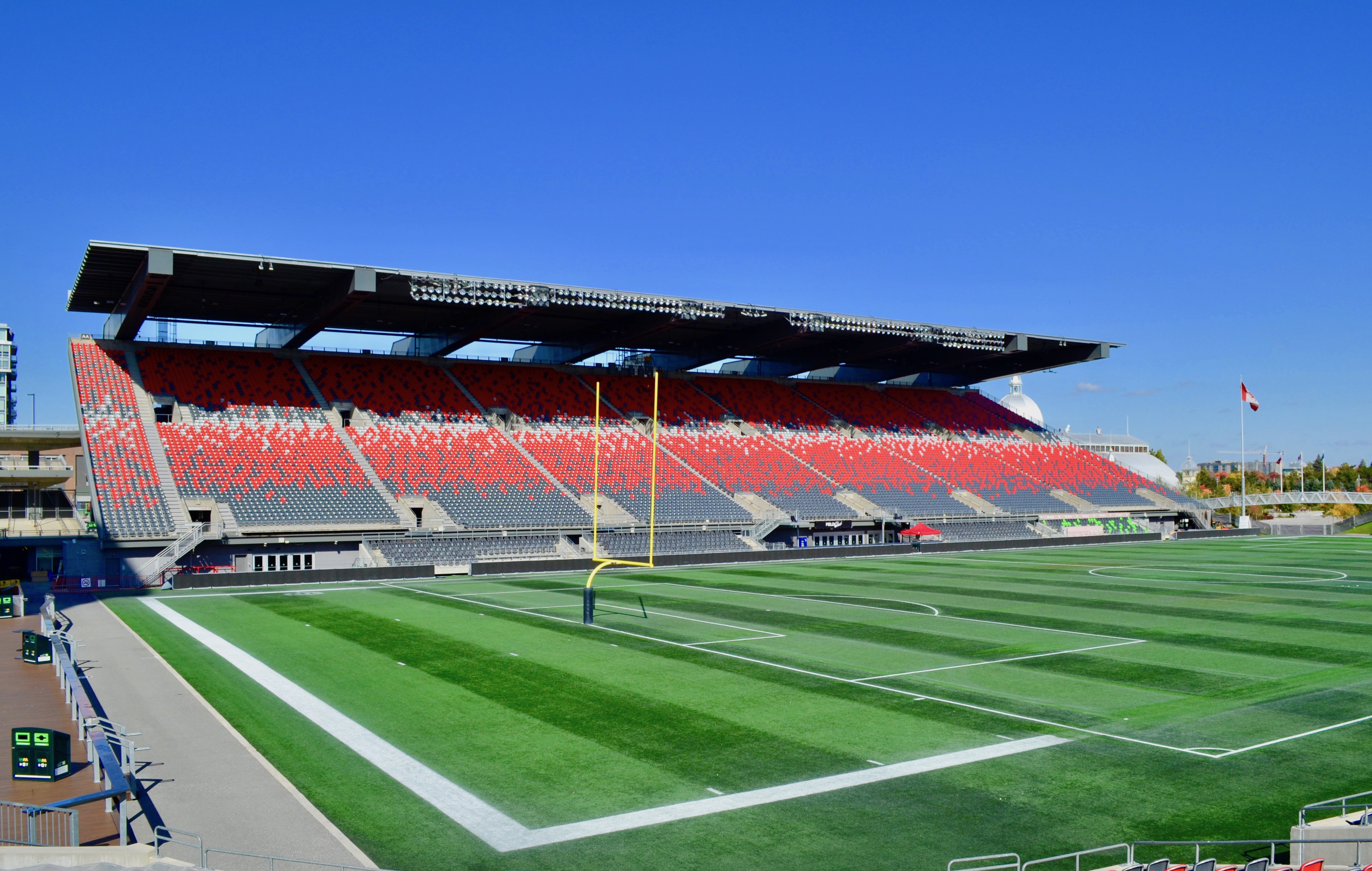
The Rapid share the integrated TD Place Stadium and TD Place Arena complex with five other tenants.

The Rapid play their home games at TD Place Stadium in Lansdowne Park, located in the city's Glebe neighbourhood. The inaugural match on April 27, 2025, was a 2–1 victory over AFC Toronto.

The club shares the 24,000-capacity venue, which contains the TD Place Arena integrated into its northern grandstand, with four other concurrent tenants: the Atlético Ottawa soccer club, the Ottawa Redblacks Canadian football club, the Ottawa 67's junior hockey club, and the Ottawa BlackJacks basketball club.

Owned by the City of Ottawa and operated by the Ottawa Sports and Entertainment Group, the precinct is currently slated for a CA$419 million redevelopment, which would replace the integrated stadium–arena with a new, separate stadium and arena complex, orbited by a number of residential tower blocks.

The club's training grounds is the RA Centre, located approximately 2 kilometres to the south of TD Place.

== Players and staff ==
=== Players ===
As of April 21, 2026.

Note: Flags indicate national team as defined under FIFA eligibility rules; some limited exceptions apply. Players may hold more than one non-FIFA nationality.

No.	Pos.	Nation	Player
1	GK	SWE	Mollie Eriksson
2	DF	NOR	Susanne Haaland
5	MF	CAN	Emily Amano
6	MF	CAN	Caitlin Crichton
7	FW	NOR	Johanne Fridlund
8	MF	POL	Kayla Adamek
9	FW	CAN	Jazmine Wilkinson
10	FW	CAN	Florence Belzile
11	MF	CAN	Sadie Waite
12	MF	CAN	Keera Melenhorst

No.	Pos.	Nation	Player
13	MF	NGR	Ngozi Okobi-Okeoghene
14	MF	KOR	Lee Min-a
15	FW	CAN	Nicola Golen
18	DF	CAN	Olivia Scott
19	DF	KOR	Choo Hyo-joo
20	MF	KOR	Jung Min-young
21	FW	USA	Melanie Forbes
22	FW	CAN	Delaney Baie Pridham
30	GK	CAN	Melissa Dagenais
33	DF	USA	Jyllissa Harris (on loan from Houston Dash)

Counts as a domestic player as she also holds Canadian nationality

=== Staff ===
As of April 21, 2026.

Executive
CEO	Thomas Gilbert
COO	Stephanie Spruston
Director, Finance & Administration	Andrew Walsh
Chief Sport Officer	Heidi Bloomfield
Technical Director	Kristina Kiss
Team Operations Manager	Kelsey Hunt
Coaching staff
Head Coach	Katrine Pedersen
Performance Analyst/Assistant Coach	Carli Tingstad
Goalkeeper Coach	Andrei Bădescu
Head of Performance	Nolan Gilmour
Head Athletic Therapist	Shannon Weber
Assistant Athletic Therapist	Taylor Dalgleish
Sport Medicine Physician	Dr. Lindsey Bradley
Equipment and Operations Coordinator	Melina Ianna-Lucio

=== Club captains ===
Years	Name	Nation
2025	Desiree Scott	Canada
2026–present	Olivia Scott	Canada

== Club culture ==
=== Supporters ===
The main fan organization for Ottawa Rapid is the Peregrines supporter group. "The Cauldron" is the official supporters section for home games, located in Section W of TD Place.

=== Rivalries ===
Since the club's debut, it and AFC Toronto have tried to cultivate a rivalry, called the "Battle of Ontario" after the NHL matchup of the same name. Ottawa's first-ever match was a 2–1 victory over Toronto. The all-time record after the 2026 season stands at 6 wins for Toronto (2 of which were part of a two-legged tie), 3 wins for Ottawa and 3 draws.

== Managers ==
As of April 4, 2026:

Name	Tenure	Refs
(Denmark) Katrine Pedersen	10 October 2024 –	

== See also ==
- Ottawa Fury (women)
- Ottawa South United
