= 2025 Halifax Tides FC season =

Canadian soccer club's season of play

Halifax Tides FC
2025 season
- CEO: Courtney Sherlock
- Head coach: Lewis Page (until June 30); Stephen Hart (after June 30)
- Stadium: Wanderers Grounds; Halifax, Nova Scotia
- Northern Super League: 6th
- Playoffs: DNQ
- Top goalscorer: League: Megumi Nakamura (5); All: Megumi Nakamura (5)
- Highest home attendance: 5,508 vs. Calgary Wild (April 26)
- Lowest home attendance: 2,891 vs. Montreal Roses (October 26)

The 2025 Halifax Tides FC season is the first in the club's history, as well as first season in Northern Super League history. The first match was played April 26, 2025, a 4–1 loss to Calgary Wild FC.

== Summary ==
On 29 October 2024, Erin McLeod became the club's first ever signing.

On 3 September 2025, Erin McLeod, having sustained a season-ending injury in June, announced her retirement from professional soccer.

== Team ==
=== Coaching staff ===
As of February 13, 2025.

Position	Name
Head coach	Stephen Hart
Assistant coach	Kennedi Herrman; Katie Barrott

=== Roster ===
As of March 18, 2025.

No.	Nat.	Name	Date of birth (age)	Since	Previous club	Notes
Goalkeepers
1	(Canada)	Erin McLeod	February 26, 1983 (aged 42)	2025	(Iceland) Stjarnan	
12	(Slovakia)	Anika Tóth	January 15, 2002 (aged 23)	2025	(Canada) Woodbridge Strikers	
18	(Canada)	Sophie Guilmette	March 24, 2001 (aged 24)	2025	(Canada) McGill Martlets	
Defenders
2	(Canada)	Mya Harnish	December 27, 2001 (aged 23)	2025	(Canada) Acadia Axewomen	
5	(Canada)	Annika Leslie	April 22, 2003 (aged 21)	2025	(United States) West Virginia Mountaineers	
5	(Sweden)	Sara Olai	July 9, 1999 (aged 25)	2025	(Sweden) IF Brommapojkarna	INT
8	(Canada)	Karima Lemire	October 19, 1998 (aged 26)	2025	(Portugal) Clube de Albergaria	
13	(United States)	Kiley Norkus	September 1, 1995 (aged 29)	2025	(Turkey) Amed S.F.K.	INT
16	(United States)	Addison Weichers	January 15, 2002 (aged 23)	2025	(United States) Utah State Aggies	
28	(France)	Éva Frémaux	March 28, 2002 (aged 22)	2025	(France) Nantes	INT
Midfielders
4	(Canada)	Marika Guay	January 17, 2000 (aged 25)	2025	(Canada) CS Longueuil	
9	(Iceland)	Gunnhildur Yrsa Jónsdóttir	September 28, 1988 (aged 36)	2025	(Iceland) Stjarnan	INT
11	(Canada)	Saorla Miller	August 18, 2001 (aged 23)	2025	(Iceland) Keflavík	
14	(Canada)	Sarah Taylor	December 6, 1996 (aged 28)	2025	–	
15	(Canada)	Daphnée Blouin	April 18, 1998 (aged 26)	2025	(Canada) Laval Rouge et Or	
21	(Canada)	Anne-Valerie Seto	February 26, 2003 (aged 22)	2025	(United States) Memphis Tigers	
22	(New Zealand)	Milly Clegg	November 1, 2005 (aged 19)	2025	(United States) Racing Louisville	INT, Loan
23	(United States)	Gianna Creighton	June 21, 2001 (aged 23)	2025	(United States) UC Irvine Anteaters	INT
32	(Canada)	Sydney Kennedy	March 2, 2001 (aged 24)	2025	(Canada) Acadia Axewomen	
Forwards
7	(Canada)	Christabel Oduro	November 1, 1992 (aged 32)	2025	(Turkey) Amed	
24	(Japan)	Megumi Nakamura	August 24, 2000 (aged 24)	2025	(Japan) AC Nagano Parceiro	INT

== Competitions ==
=== Northern Super League ===
==== Table ====
Pos	Team	Pld	W	D	L	GF	GA	GD	Pts	Qualification
1	AFC Toronto (S)	25	16	3	6	42	24	+18	51	Advance to playoffs
2	Ottawa Rapid	25	11	6	8	41	26	+15	39 (Note: Head-to-head points tied 7–7; head-to-head goal difference: Ottawa Rapid +3, Vancouver Rise –3)	Advance to playoffs
3	Vancouver Rise (C)	25	11	6	8	38	36	+2	39	Advance to playoffs
4	Montreal Roses	25	10	6	9	30	23	+7	36	Advance to playoffs
5	Calgary Wild	25	9	2	14	26	42	−16	29	
6	Halifax Tides	25	3	7	15	17	43	−26	16	

Source: NSL
Rules for classification: 1) Head-to-head points; 2) Head-to-head goal difference; 3) Overall goal difference; 4) Most wins; 5) Most goals scored; 6) Least goals conceded; 7) Least red cards; 8) Least yellow cards; 9) Drawing of lots.
(C) Champion; (S) Supporters' Shield winner

==== Results by match ====
Match	1	2	3	4	5	6	7	8	9	10	11	12	13	14	15	16	17	18	19	20	21	22	23	24	25
Ground	H	A	A	H	A	A	H	A	H	A	H	H	A	H	H	A	A	H	H	A	A	H	H	A	H
Result	L	L	D	L	L	L	W	L																	
Position (Note: Positions show the situation at the end of the week the match was played, not the position at the conclusion of matches or game days.)	6	6	6	6	6	6	6	6																	

Source: #Matches
H = Home; N = Neutral; A = Away; W = Win; D = Draw; L = Loss; = Playoffs

==== Matches ====
April 26 1	Halifax Tides	1–4	Calgary Wild	Halifax, Nova Scotia
18:00 AT	Jónsdóttir (yellow card) 38'; Guay 51'; Olai (yellow card) 77'	Report	Moore 2'; Dougherty Howard 7'; Johnson 25', 81'	Stadium: Wanderers Grounds; Attendance: 5,508; Referee: Marie-Soleil Beaudoin

May 5 2	Vancouver Rise	1–0	Halifax Tides	Burnaby, British Columbia
23:00 AT	Spencer 52'; Woeller (yellow card) 70'	Report	Olai (yellow card) 37'; Frémaux (yellow card) 43'; Weichers (yellow card) 63'	Stadium: Swangard Stadium; Attendance: 2,061; Referee: Sheila Couture

May 10 3	Montreal Roses	0–0	Halifax Tides	Laval, Quebec
14:00 AT		Report	Lemire (yellow card) 68'; Frémaux (yellow card) 87'	Stadium: CS Bois-de-Boulogne; Attendance: 2,922; Referee: Anne-Marie Canuel

May 17 4	Halifax Tides	0–1	AFC Toronto	Halifax, Nova Scotia
14:00 AT	Lemire (yellow card) 34'	Report	Barnett 5'; Hunter (yellow card) 27'; Okoronkwo (yellow card) 44'	Stadium: Wanderers Grounds; Attendance: 3,823; Referee: Anne-Marie Canuel

May 21 5	Vancouver Rise	2–1	Halifax Tides	Burnaby, British Columbia
23:00 AT	Pechersky 39'; Lee 44'	Report	Miller 15'; Olai (yellow card) 76'; Blouin (yellow card) 77'	Stadium: Swangard Stadium; Attendance: 1,900; Referee: Salma Flores-Desrochers

June 5 6	Calgary Wild	3–2	Halifax Tides	Calgary, Alberta
22:00 AT	Green 23'; Robertson 41'; Stewart 45+3'; Gray (yellow card) 61'; O'Neill (yellow card) 87'; Wilson (yellow card) 88'	Report	Miller 72'; Nakamura 76'; Frémaux (yellow card) 80'	Stadium: McMahon Stadium; Attendance: 2,946; Referee: Salma Flores-Desrochers

June 10 7	Halifax Tides	2–1	Ottawa Rapid	Halifax, Nova Scotia
19:00 AT	Frémaux (yellow card) 43'; Nakamura 57'; Kennedy (yellow card) 67'; Jónsdóttir 74'	Report	O. Scott 14'	Stadium: Wanderers Grounds; Attendance: 3,140; Referee: Isabelle Duclos

June 21 8	AFC Toronto	3–1	Halifax Tides	Toronto, Ontario
17:00 AT	Hunter 21', 48'; Okoronkwo 52'; Lantaigne (yellow card) 90+4'	Report	Rollins 5' (o.g.); Norkus (yellow card) 67'	Stadium: York Lions Stadium; Attendance: 3,098; Referee: Carly Shaw-MacLaren

July 7 9	Halifax Tides	1–0	Calgary Wild	Halifax, Nova Scotia
18:30 AT	Nakamura 36'; Guay (yellow card) 58'; Seto (yellow card) 89'	Report	Wilson (yellow card) 88'	Stadium: Wanderers Grounds; Attendance: 4,332; Referee: Sheila Couture

July 12 10	Montreal Roses	0–1	Halifax Tides	Laval, Quebec
18:00 AT	Smith (yellow card) 46'; Sauvé (yellow card) 53'	Report	Kennedy (yellow card) 65'; Blouin 87'	Stadium: CS Bois-de-Boulogne; Attendance: 2,900; Referee: Isabelle Duclos

July 15 11	Halifax Tides	0–1	AFC Toronto	Halifax, Nova Scotia
18:30 AT	Leslie (yellow card) 26'; Blouin (yellow card) 42'	Report	Rowe 79'; Soto (yellow card) 87'; Lantaigne (yellow card) 90+2'	Stadium: Wanderers Grounds; Attendance: 4,051; Referee: Anne-Marie Canuel

July 19 12	Halifax Tides	0–6	Vancouver Rise	Halifax, Nova Scotia
15:00 AT	Weichers (yellow card) 67'	Report	Ward 1', 45'; Spencer 8'; Quinn 31'; Stanton 74'; Lee 77'; Chang (yellow card) 90'	Stadium: Wanderers Grounds; Attendance: 4,255; Referee: Sheila Couture

July 25 13	Ottawa Rapid	1–0	Halifax Tides	Ottawa, Ontario
20:30 AT	O. Scott 41'	Report	Guay (yellow card) 37'; Allen (yellow card) 45+2'; Frémaux (yellow card) 45+2'	Stadium: TD Place Stadium; Attendance: 3,006; Referee: Isabelle Duclos

August 2 14	Halifax Tides	1–1	Montreal Roses	Halifax, Nova Scotia
15:00 AT	Abdui 4'; Hill (yellow card) 14'; Whitaker (yellow card) 67'	Report	Guay (yellow card) 45'; Lemire (yellow card) 49'; Allen 73'	Stadium: Wanderers Grounds; Attendance: 3,800; Referee: Salma Flores-Desrochers

August 9 15	Halifax Tides	0–0	Vancouver Rise	Halifax, Nova Scotia
15:00 AT		Report		Stadium: Wanderers Grounds; Attendance: 4,142; Referee: Natalie Berry

August 16 16	Calgary Wild	1–0	Halifax Tides	Calgary, Alberta
17:00 AT	Harvey 59'; Baucom (yellow card) 83'	Report	Blouin (yellow card) 36'; Vallerand (yellow card) 70'; Leslie (yellow card) 74'	Stadium: McMahon Stadium; Attendance: 2,942; Referee: Isabelle Duclos

August 28 17	Ottawa Rapid	5–0	Halifax Tides	Ottawa, Ontario
20:00 AT	Pridham 10'; Lee Min-A 46'; Scott 66'; Forbes 77'; Downing 83'	Report	Weichers (yellow card) 26'	Stadium: TD Place Stadium; Attendance: 953; Referee: Marie-Soleil Beaudoin

September 6 18	Halifax Tides	0–1	AFC Toronto	Halifax, Nova Scotia
15:00 AT	Olai (yellow card) 37'; Leslie (yellow card) 72'; Kennedy (yellow card) 88'	Report	Okoronkwo 35'	Stadium: Wanderers Grounds; Attendance: 3,872; Referee: Marie-Soleil Beaudoin

September 13 19	Halifax Tides	1–1	Ottawa Rapid	Halifax, Nova Scotia
13:00 AT	Olai (yellow card) 7'; Nakamura 40'; Taylor (yellow card) 56'	Report	Belzile 47'	Stadium: Wanderers Grounds; Attendance: 3,501; Referee: Isabelle Duclos

September 18 20	Montreal Roses	2–0	Halifax Tides	Laval, Quebec
20:00 AT	Hill 40'; Paquin 71'; Kang (yellow card) 82'	Report	Weichers (yellow card) 9'; Cedeño (yellow card) 18'; Vallerand (yellow card) 28'; Kennedy (yellow card) 50'; Nakamura (yellow card) 66'	Stadium: CS Bois-de-Boulogne; Attendance: 3,053; Referee: Anne-Marie Canuel

September 21 22	AFC Toronto	1–1	Halifax Tides	Toronto, Ontario
15:00 AT	Okoronkwo 38'	Report	Olai (yellow card) 8'; Cameron 27'; Weichers (yellow card) 62'	Stadium: York Lions Stadium; Attendance: 2,825; Referee: Salma Flores-Desrochers

September 27 22	Halifax Tides	1–1	Vancouver Rise	Halifax, Nova Scotia
15:00 AT	Clegg 14'; Weichers (yellow card) 20'	Report	Ward 62'	Stadium: Wanderers Grounds; Attendance: 3,359; Referee: Carly Shaw-MacLaren

October 2 23	Halifax Tides	2–2	Montreal Roses	Halifax, Nova Scotia
19:00 AT	Miller 36' 70'; Vallerand (yellow card) 59'; Cedeño (yellow card) 90+2'	Report	Leas (yellow card) 53'; Bilbault 67'; Kang 73'; Monyard (yellow card) 86'	Stadium: Wanderers Grounds; Attendance: 2,891; Referee: Salma Flores-Desrochers

October 11 24	Calgary Wild	3–1	Halifax Tides	Calgary, Alberta
15:00 AT	Dougherty Howard 3, 49'; Stordy 42'; K. Stewart (yellow card) 43'	Report	Kennedy 26'; Olai (yellow card) 48'; Cedeno (yellow card) 50'	Stadium: McMahon Stadium; Attendance: 2,541; Referee: Sheila Couture

October 15 25	Halifax Tides	1–2	Ottawa Rapid	Halifax, Nova Scotia
18:30 AT	Nakamura 72'	Report	Fridlund 30'; Adamek (yellow card) 42'; Jónsdóttir 45+1' (o.g.); Amano (yellow card) 35'	Stadium: Wanderers Grounds; Attendance: 4,226; Referee: Anne-Marie Canuel

== Transfers in ==
No.	Pos.	Player	From club	Fee/notes	Date	Source
1	GK	(Canada) Erin McLeod		Free agent	29 October 2024	
23	MF	(United States) Gianna Creighton		Free agent	9 January 2025	
7	FW	(Canada) Christabel Oduro		Free agent	10 January 2025	
13	DF	(United States) Kiley Norkus		Free agent	22 January 2025	
15	MF	(Canada) Daphnée Blouin		Free agent	24 January 2025	
22	FW	(New Zealand) Milly Clegg	(United States) Racing Louisville FC	Loan	28 January 2025	
9	MF	(Iceland) Gunnhildur Yrsa Jónsdóttir		Free agent	14 February 2025	
21	MF	(Canada) Anne-Valérie Seto		Free agent	1 March 2025	
18	GK	(Canada) Sophie Guilmette		Transfer	5 March 2025	
4	MF	(Canada) Marika Guay		Free agent	7 March 2025	
5	DF	(Sweden) Sara Olai		Free agent	15 March 2025	
2	DF	(Canada) Mya Harnish		Transfer	18 March 2025	
10	FW	(United States) Amanda Allen	(United States) Orlando Pride	Loan	2 July 2025	
12	FW	(Jamaica) Tiffany Cameron	(Spain) Real Betis	Transfer	3 July 2025	
	MF	(United States) Sofia Cedeño	(United States) Seattle Reign FC	Transfer	9 August 2025	

== Transfers out ==
No.	Pos.	Player	To club	Fee/notes	Date	Source
23	MF	(United States) Gianna Creighton		Mutual contract termination	16 July 2025	
	MF	(United States) Sofia Cedeño	(United States) Seattle Reign FC	Transfer	8 December 2025	

== Statistics ==
No.	Pos	Nat	Player	Total		NSL	
No.	Pos	Nat	Player	Apps	Goals	Apps	Goals
Goalkeepers
1	GK	(Canada) CAN	Erin McLeod	6	0	6	0
12	GK	(Slovakia) SVK	Anika Tóth	19	0	18+1	0
29	GK	(Canada) CAN	Olivia Busby	0	0	0	0
Defenders
2	DF	(Canada) CAN	Mya Harnish	2	0	0+2	0
5	DF	(Canada) CAN	Annika Leslie	17	0	14+3	0
8	DF	(Canada) CAN	Karima Lemire	24	0	19+5	0
13	DF	(United States) USA	Kiley Norkus	22	0	16+6	0
16	DF	(United States) USA	Addison Weichers	19	0	15+4	0
21	DF	(France) FRA	Éva Frémaux	20	0	17+3	0
44	DF	(Canada) CAN	Julianne Vallerand	12	0	11+1	0
Midfielders
4	MF	(Canada) CAN	Marika Guay	16	1	10+6	1
6	MF	(Sweden) SWE	Sara Olai	23	0	22+1	0
9	MF	(Iceland) ISL	Gunnhildur Yrsa Jónsdóttir	14	1	13+1	1
11	MF	(Canada) CAN	Saorla Miller	25	4	19+6	4
14	MF	(Canada) CAN	Sarah Taylor	15	0	5+10	0
15	MF	(Canada) CAN	Daphnée Blouin	16	1	2+14	1
23	MF	(United States) USA	Gianna Creighton	8	0	6+2	0
32	MF	(Canada) CAN	Sydney Kennedy	24	1	18+6	1
36	MF	(United States) USA	Sofia Cedeño	11	0	6+5	0
Forwards
7	FW	(Canada) CAN	Christabel Oduro	13	0	4+9	0
10	FW	(Canada) CAN	Amanda Allen	13	1	8+5	1
21	FW	(Canada) CAN	Anne-Valérie Seto	18	0	3+15	0
22	FW	(New Zealand) NZL	Milly Clegg	20	1	15+5	1
24	FW	(Japan) JPN	Megumi Nakamura	24	5	19+5	5
33	FW	(Jamaica) JAM	Tiffany Cameron	12	1	9+3	1

Source: Competitions
