= 2025 AFC Toronto season =

Canadian soccer club's season of play

AFC Toronto
2025 season
- CEO: Helena Ruken
- Head coach: Marko Milanović
- Stadium: York Lions Stadium; North York, Ontario
- Northern Super League: 1st
- Playoffs: Runners-up
- Top goalscorer: League: Hunter (14); All: Hunter (16)
- Highest home attendance: 14,518 vs. Montreal Roses FC (April 19)
- Lowest home attendance: 1,319 vs. Calgary Wild (May 1)
- Average home league attendance: 4,029

The 2025 AFC Toronto season is the first in the club's history, as well as first season in Northern Super League history. The inaugural game was played on April 19, 2025, a 1–0 loss to Montreal Roses FC.

== Team ==
=== Coaching staff ===
As of August 7, 2024

| Position | Name |
|---|---|
| Head coach | Marko Milanović |
| Assistant coach | Sylvia Forbes |
| Goalkeeping coach | Rasih Pala |
| Head Athletic Therapist | Karla Leong |
| Sports Science & Performance coach | Mariana Gonzalez Moreno |
| Athletic therapist | Kia Halsall |

=== Roster ===
As of April 18, 2025

Note: Flags indicate national team as defined under FIFA eligibility rules; some limited exceptions apply. Players may hold more than one non-FIFA nationality.

| No. | Pos. | Nation | Player |
|---|---|---|---|
| 1 | GK | FIN | Sofia Manner |
| 2 | DF | CAN | April Lantaigne |
| 3 | DF | KOR | Hong Hye-ji |
| 4 | MF | CAN | Nikayla Small |
| 5 | DF | USA | Croix Soto |
| 6 | DF | CAN | Kaela Hansen |
| 7 | FW | CAN | Mya Jones (on loan from San Diego Wave) |
| 8 | DF | CAN | Emma Regan (captain) |
| 9 | FW | CAN | Jade Kovacevic |
| 10 | FW | CAN | Leah Pais |
| 11 | FW | CAN | Kaylee Hunter |
| 12 | FW | USA | Shaina Ashouri |

| No. | Pos. | Nation | Player |
|---|---|---|---|
| 13 | MF | JPN | Aoi Kizaki |
| 14 | DF | CAN | Sarah Rollins |
| 17 | MF | COD | Nyota Katembo |
| 18 | MF | PHI | Ivymae Perez |
| 19 | DF | CAN | Ashley Cathro |
| 20 | MF | CAN | Sonia Walk |
| 21 | GK | POR | Sierra Cota-Yarde |
| 22 | MF | SKN | Cloey Uddenberg |
| 23 | FW | NGA | Esther Okoronkwo |
| 24 | FW | CAN | Amanda West (on loan from Houston Dash) |
| 31 | MF | USA | Colby Barnett |
| 94 | MF | CAN | Victoria Pickett (on loan from North Carolina Courage) |

== Competitions ==
=== Northern Super League ===
==== Table ====
| Pos | Team | Pld | W | D | L | GF | GA | GD | Pts | Qualification |
|---|---|---|---|---|---|---|---|---|---|---|
| 1 | AFC Toronto (S) | 25 | 16 | 3 | 6 | 42 | 24 | +18 | 51 | Advance to playoffs |
| 2 | Ottawa Rapid | 25 | 11 | 6 | 8 | 41 | 26 | +15 | 39 (Note: Head-to-head points tied 7–7; head-to-head goal difference: Ottawa Rapid +3, Vancouver Rise –3) | Advance to playoffs |
| 3 | Vancouver Rise (C) | 25 | 11 | 6 | 8 | 38 | 36 | +2 | 39 | Advance to playoffs |
| 4 | Montreal Roses | 25 | 10 | 6 | 9 | 30 | 23 | +7 | 36 | Advance to playoffs |
| 5 | Calgary Wild | 25 | 9 | 2 | 14 | 26 | 42 | −16 | 29 | |
| 6 | Halifax Tides | 25 | 3 | 7 | 15 | 17 | 43 | −26 | 16 | |

Source: NSL
Rules for classification: 1) Head-to-head points; 2) Head-to-head goal difference; 3) Overall goal difference; 4) Most wins; 5) Most goals scored; 6) Least goals conceded; 7) Least red cards; 8) Least yellow cards; 9) Drawing of lots.
(C) Champion; (S) Supporters' Shield winner

==== Results by match ====
| Match | 1 | 2 | 3 | 4 | 5 | 6 | 7 | 8 | 9 | 10 | 11 | 12 | 13 | 14 | 15 | 16 | 17 | 18 | 19 | 20 | 21 | 22 | 23 | 24 | 25 |
|---|---|---|---|---|---|---|---|---|---|---|---|---|---|---|---|---|---|---|---|---|---|---|---|---|---|
| Ground | N | A | H | H | A | A | H | A | A | H | H | A | H | A | A | A | A | H | H | A | H | H | A | A | H |
| Result | L | L | W | D | W | W | L | W | W | W | W | W | L | L | W | W | D | L | W | W | W | D | W | W | W |
| Position (Note: Positions show the situation at the end of the week the match was played, not the position at the conclusion of matches or game days.) | 5 | 5 | 5 | 5 | 4 | 3 | 5 | 2 | 2 | 1 | 1 | 1 | 1 | 1 | 1 | 1 | 1 | 1 | 1 | 1 | 1 | 1 | 1 | 1 | 1 |

Source: #Matches
H = Home; N = Neutral; A = Away; W = Win; D = Draw; L = Loss; = Playoffs

==== Matches ====
| April 19 1 | AFC Toronto | 0–1 | Montreal Roses FC | Toronto, Ontario |
| 4pm ET | | Report | Boychuk 1'; Bilbaut (yellow card) 66' | Stadium: BMO Field; Attendance: 14,518; Referee: Carly Marissa Shaw-MacLaren |

| April 27 2 | Ottawa Rapid FC | 2–1 | AFC Toronto | Ottawa, Ontario |
| 1pm ET | Lee 54'; Scott 81' | Report | Hunter 90+3' | Stadium: TD Place Stadium; Attendance: 8,467; Referee: Sheila Couture |

| May 1 3 | AFC Toronto | 2–1 | Calgary Wild FC | Toronto, Ontario |
| 7pm ET | Okoronkwo 25', 53', (yellow card) 71'; Hong (yellow card) 75' | Report | Stordy (yellow card) 13'; Moore (yellow card) 80', (goal) 85' | Stadium: York Lions Stadium; Attendance: 1,319; Referee: Salma Flores-Desrochers |

| May 11 4 | AFC Toronto | 1–1 | Vancouver Rise FC | Toronto, Ontario |
| 2pm ET | Kizaki 84'; Small (yellow card) 86'; Barnett (yellow card) 90+1' | Report | De Filippo 90+4' | Stadium: York Lions Stadium; Attendance: 2,258; Referee: Isabelle Duclos |

| May 17 5 | Halifax Tides FC | 0–1 | AFC Toronto | Halifax, Nova Scotia |
| 1pm ET | Lemire (yellow card) 34' | Report | Barnett 5'; Hunter (yellow card) 27'; Okoronkwo (yellow card) 44' | Stadium: Wanderers Grounds; Attendance: 3,823; Referee: Anne-Marie Canuel |

| May 22 6 | Montreal Roses FC | 0–2 | AFC Toronto | Laval, Quebec |
| 7pm ET | Leas (yellow card) 61' | Report | Okoronkwo 34'; Small (yellow card) 65'; Regan 72' | Stadium: Stade Boreale; Attendance: 2,606; Referee: Sheila Couture |

| June 7 7 | AFC Toronto | 0–4 | Ottawa Rapid FC | Toronto, Ontario |
| 12pm ET | | Report | Pridham 1', 20', 60', (yellow card) 43'; Downing 27'; Hyo-joo (yellow card) 50'; Golen (yellow card) 80' | Stadium: York Lions Stadium; Attendance: 2,483; Referee: Sheila Couture |

| June 11 8 | Vancouver Rise | 2–3 | AFC Toronto | Burnaby, British Columbia |
| 22:00 ET | Sawan (yellow card) 27'; Lee 68'; Longhurst (yellow card) 79'; Quinn 90+8' | Report | Regan 1', (yellow card) 78'; Hunter 42'; Cathro (yellow card) 51'; Small 73'; Rollins (yellow card) 90+7' | Stadium: Swangard Stadium; Attendance: 3,343; Referee: Salma Flores-Desrochers |

| June 14 9 | Calgary Wild FC | 1–2 | AFC Toronto | Calgary, Alberta |
| 17:00 ET | Stordy (yellow card) 20'; Dougherty Howard (yellow card) 43'; Steer 53' | Report | Regan (yellow card) 14'; Small 18', 26' | Stadium: McMahon Stadium; Attendance: 3,977; Referee: Isabelle Duclos |

| June 21 10 | AFC Toronto | 3–1 | Halifax Tides | Toronto, Ontario |
| 16:00 ET | Hunter 21', 48'; Okoronkwo 52'; Lantaigne (yellow card) 90+4' | Report | Rollins 5' (o.g.); Norkus (yellow card) 67' | Stadium: York Lions Stadium; Attendance: 3,098; Referee: Carly Shaw-MacLaren |

| Jul 10 11 | AFC Toronto | 3–0 | Ottawa Rapid FC | Toronto, Ontario |
| 19:00 ET | Hunter 17', 24'; Regan (yellow card) 45+1'; Small (yellow card) 50'; Manager (yellow card) 60'; Uddenberg 90' | Report | | Stadium: York Lions Stadium; Attendance: 2,510; Referee: Salma Flores-Desrochers |

| July 15 12 | Halifax Tides | 0–1 | AFC Toronto | Halifax, Nova Scotia |
| 17:30 ET | Leslie (yellow card) 26'; Blouin (yellow card) 42' | Report | Rowe 79'; Soto (yellow card) 87'; Lantaigne (yellow card) 90+2' | Stadium: Wanderers Grounds; Attendance: 4,051; Referee: Anne-Marie Canuel |

| July 18 13 | AFC Toronto | 1–2 | Montreal Roses | Toronto, Ontario |
| 19:30 ET | Pickett 77' | Report | Abdu 30'; Schenk (yellow card) 37'; Sauvé (yellow card) 62' (goal) 68' | Stadium: York Lions Stadium; Attendance: 2,873; Referee: Marie-Soleil Beaudoin |

| July 24 14 | Vancouver Rise | 2–1 | AFC Toronto | Burnaby, British Columbia |
| 22:00 ET | Chang 19', 35'; Faulknor (yellow card) 21'; De Filippo (yellow card) 42'; Hagman (yellow card) 90+3' | Report | Hunter 9' | Stadium: Swangard Stadium; Attendance: 3,911; Referee: Marie-Soleil Beaudoin |

| August 2 15 | Calgary Wild FC | 1–2 | AFC Toronto | Calgary, Alberta |
| 16:00 ET | Moore 8' | Report | Hunter 12'; Regan 18' | Stadium: McMahon Stadium; Attendance: 2,676; Referee: Sheila Couture |

| August 9 16 | Montreal Roses | 1–2 | AFC Toronto | Laval, Quebec |
| 13:00 ET | Hill 45+1' | Report | Small 23'; Hunter 36' | Stadium: Centre Sportif Bois-de-Boulogne; Attendance: 2,150; Referee: Isabelle Duclos |

| August 13 17 | Ottawa Rapid FC | 1–1 | AFC Toronto | Ottawa, Ontario |
| 19:00 ET | Gibson (yellow card) 11'; Lee 42'; Pridham (yellow card) 57' | Report | Hunter 21' | Stadium: TD Place Stadium; Attendance: 2,887; Referee: Salma Flores-Desrochers |

| August 17 18 | AFC Toronto | 0–1 | Vancouver Rise | Toronto, Ontario |
| 19:00 ET | | Report | Spencer (yellow card) 29' (yellow-red card) 39'; De Filippo 46'; McAslan (yellow card) 90+4' | Stadium: BMO Field; Attendance: 7,771; Referee: Anne-Marie Canuel |

| August 30 19 | AFC Toronto | 2–0 | Calgary Wild FC | Toronto, Ontario |
| 14:00 ET | Regan (yellow card) 45'; Burns 45+1', 47' | Report | | Stadium: York Lions Stadium; Attendance: 2,589; Referee: Sheila Couture |

| September 6 20 | Halifax Tides | 0–1 | AFC Toronto | Halifax, Nova Scotia |
| 14:00 ET | Olai (yellow card) 37'; Leslie (yellow card) 72'; Kennedy (yellow card) 88' | Report | Okoronkwo 35' | Stadium: Wanderers Grounds; Attendance: 3,872; Referee: Marie-Soleil Beaudoin |

| September 13 21 | AFC Toronto | 7–0 | Vancouver Rise | Toronto, Ontario |
| 14:00 ET | Okoronkwo 5', 64'; Small (yellow card) 26'; Hunter 45', 68'; Hansen 45+5'; Stratigakis 49'; Kovacevic 85' | Report | De Filippo (yellow card) 9', (red card) 45+6'; Wright (yellow card) 16'; Cowart (yellow card) 38'; Abdu (yellow card) 39'; Lake (yellow card) 88' | Stadium: York Lions Stadium; Attendance: 2,917; Referee: Angelina Baldino |

| September 21 22 | AFC Toronto | 1–1 | Halifax Tides | Toronto, Ontario |
| 14:00 ET | Okoronkwo 38' | Report | Olai (yellow card) 8'; Cameron 27'; Weichers (yellow card) 62' | Stadium: York Lions Stadium; Attendance: 2,825; Referee: Salma Flores-Desrochers |

| September 26 23 | Ottawa Rapid FC | 0–1 | AFC Toronto | Ottawa, Ontario |
| 19:00 ET | Pridham (yellow card) 32' | Report | Hunter 32'; Barnett (yellow card) 43' | Stadium: TD Place Stadium; Attendance: 3,004; Referee: Isabelle Duclos |

| October 4 24 | Calgary Wild FC | 1–2 | AFC Toronto | Calgary, Alberta |
| 16:00 ET | O'Neill (yellow card) 21'; Baucom 45+3' | Report | Hunter 19'; Uddenberg 34'; Novak (red card) 61'; Regan (yellow card) 69' | Stadium: McMahon Stadium; Attendance: 2,780; Referee: Anne-Marie Canuel |

| October 18 25 | AFC Toronto | 2–1 | Montreal Roses | Toronto, Ontario |
| 12:00 ET | Stratigakis 42'; Uddenberg (yellow card) 81'; Small 86'; Okoronkwo (yellow card) 90+6' | Report | Hess 10' | Stadium: York Lions Stadium; Attendance: 3,181; Referee: Myriam Marcotte |

=== Playoffs ===
| November 1, 2025 Semi-finals leg 1 | Montreal Roses | 0–2 | AFC Toronto | Laval, Quebec |
| 12:00 ET | | Report | Small 7'; Hunter 70' | Stadium: Stade Boréale; Attendance: 2,296; Referee: Marie-Soleil Beaudoin |

| November 10, 2025 Semi-finals leg 2 | AFC Toronto | 4–1 | Montreal Roses | Toronto, Ontario |
| 18:00 ET | Okoronkwo 7', 21', 27'; Rowe 84' | Report | Boychuk 74' | Stadium: York Lions Stadium; Referee: Carly Shaw-MacLaren |
Note: The match, originally scheduled for 9 November was postponed due to snow.

| November 15, 2025 Final | AFC Toronto | 1–2 | Vancouver Rise | Toronto, Ontario |
| 2:00 ET | Hunter 20'; Stratigakis (yellow card) 27'; Okoronkwo (yellow card) 52'; Barnett (yellow card) 74'; Rollins (yellow card) 74'; Pickett (yellow card) 82' | Report | Cota-Yarde 54' (o.g.); Ward 68'; Chang (yellow card) 72'; Abdu (yellow card) 82'; Spencer (yellow card) 90+4' | Stadium: BMO Field; Attendance: 12,429; Referee: Marie-Soleil Beaudoin |
