= Jah'Mila =

Canadian reggae musician

- Born: Jhamiela Smith; Kingston, Jamaica
- Genres: Reggae
- Website: www.jahmilamusic.com

Jhamiela Smith is a Jamaican-born Canadian reggae musician, better known by her stage name, Jah'Mila.

== Career ==
Jah'Mila has been singing professionally since she was 17 years old. She performed background vocals for the band Dub Kartel and sang harmonies for The Wailers, Black Uhuru, Cherine Anderson, and The Congos. She made her solo debut in 2016 with the song, "Reggae Soul." Jah'Mila performed at the 2019 Halifax Urban Folk Festival. In 2020, she released her song, "Chant Their Names", which critiqued police brutality. In 2022, Jah'Mila performed a tribute to Nina Simone with Symphony Nova Scotia. Jah'Mila was described by The Coast as "arguably the biggest name in Halifax reggae."

In 2022, Jah'Mila released her debut LP, Roots Girl. Her father, guitarist Earl "Chinna" Smith, played on the album, which was recorded in Jamaica. The Coast named Roots Girl one of their top ten albums of 2022. Roots Girl was nominated for Reggae Recording of the Year at the 2024 JUNO Awards.

In February 2023, she performed with the National Arts Centre Orchestra at the National Arts Centre in Ottawa as part of a series of performances tracing the history of reggae. She performed with the Toronto Symphony Orchestra in April 2023.

In 2024, she released her sophomore album Woman of the Sun. In 2025 she contributed a cover of Joel Plaskett's "Harbour Boys" to the Plaskett tribute album Songs from the Gang. She was featured on "Victory," an anthem for the Northern Super League, Canada’s professional women’s soccer league, created Halifax Tides FC player, Tiffany Cameron, also known as Tiff.

== Personal life ==
Jhamiela Smith was born in Kingston, Jamaica. Her father is guitarist, Earl "Chinna" Smith. After visiting her mother in Halifax, Nova Scotia over a decade, she relocated there. While in Halifax, she met her former partner, musician Adrian Dunn.

== Discography ==
- Roots Girl (2022)
- Woman of the Sun (2024)

== Awards and nominations ==
Year	Award	Category	Work	Result	Ref.
2023	East Coast Music Awards	Global Music Recording of the Year	Roots Girl	Won	
2023	East Coast Music Awards	African Canadian Artist of the Year	n/a	Nominated	
2024	Juno Awards	Reggae Recording of the Year	Roots Girl	Nominated	
