= Anne-Valérie Seto =

Canadian soccer player

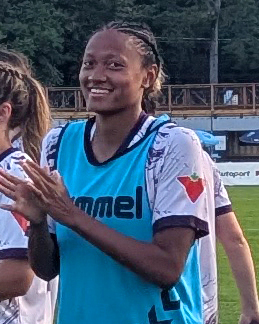
- Seto in 2025 with Halifax Tides FC

Personal information
- Full name: Anne-Valérie Riol Seto
- Date of birth: February 26, 2003 (age 23)
- Place of birth: Montréal, Québec, Canada
- Height: 5 ft 8 in (1.73 m)
- Position: Midfielder

Youth career
- CS Mont-Royal Outremont
- CS Notre-Dame-de-Grâce

College career
Years	Team	Apps	(Gls)
2021–2024	Memphis Tigers	67	(8)

Senior career*
Years	Team	Apps	(Gls)
2022	CS Mont-Royal Outremont	3	(0)
2024	FC Olympia	4	(0)
2025	Halifax Tides FC	18	(0)
2026–	Montreal Roses FC	0	(0)
- * Club domestic league appearances and goals as of October 17, 2025

Anne-Valérie Riol Seto (司徒: Si1 Tou4) (born February 26, 2003) is a Canadian soccer player who plays as a midfielder for Montreal Roses FC.

== College career ==
In 2021, Seto began attending the University of Memphis, where she played for the women's soccer team. On August 18, 2022, she scored a brace for her first goals in a 6-1 victory over the Little Rock Trojans. In 2024, she was named to the All-AAC Second Team. She was also named to the AAC All-Academic Team three times.

== Club career ==
In 2022, Seto played with CS Mont-Royal Outremont in the Première ligue de soccer du Québec.

In 2025, she signed with Halifax Tides FC in the Northern Super League.

On 14 April 2026, Seto was announced at Montreal Roses FC.

== Career statistics ==
As of October 17, 2025

Club	Season	League			Playoffs		National Cup		League Cup		Total	
Club	Season	League	Apps	Goals	Apps	Goals	Apps	Goals	Apps	Goals	Apps	Goals
CS Mont-Royal Outremont	2022	Première ligue de soccer du Québec	3	0	—		—		—		3	0
FC Olympia	2024	USL W League	4	0	2	0	—		—		6	0
Halifax Tides FC	2025	Northern Super League	18	0	—		—		—		18	0
Career total			25	0	2	0	0	0	0	0	27	0
