= Sara Olai =

Swedish footballer

Personal information
- Full name: Sara Astrid Ulrika Olai
- Date of birth: July 9, 1999 (age 27)
- Place of birth: Motala, Sweden
- Height: 1.72 m (5 ft 7 1/2 in)
- Position: Defender

Youth career
- Borens IK
- 2015–2016: Linköping FC

Senior career*
Years	Team	Apps	(Gls)
2012–2014	Borens IK B	12	(0)
2013–2014	Borens IK	6	(1)
2015–2017	Linköping FC	3	(0)
2018	Ljusdals IF	22	(2)
2019–2020	IK Uppsala	48	(10)
2021–2022	Djurgårdens IF	46	(5)
2023–2024	IF Brommapojkarna	50	(7)
2025	Halifax Tides FC	23	(0)

International career^{‡}
2015–2016	Sweden U17	5	(0)
2016	Sweden U19	2	(0)
- * Club domestic league appearances and goals as of October 17, 2025 ‡ National team caps and goals as of February 25, 2025

Sara Astrid Ulrika Olai (born July 9, 1999) is a Swedish professional footballer.

== Early life ==
Olai was born in Motala, Sweden and began playing youth football with Borens IK. In 2015, she joined the youth system of Linköping FC.

== Club career ==
Olai began her senior career with Borens IK in the lower Swedish divisions. She made her debut with the first team at age 14 in the Svenska Cupen.

In 2015, she debuted with the Linköping FC first team in cup matches, while playing primarily with the youth side. In April 2016, she made her Damallsvenskan debut against Kristianstads.

In December 2017, it was announced that she signed with Norrköping for the 2018 season, however a month later she instead changed clubs and joined Ljusdals IF in the second tier Elitettan. After one season, she departed the club.

In 2019, she signed with IK Uppsala in the Elitettan. At the end of the 2019 season, she was named the league's Defender of the Year and also helped the club earn promotion to the first tier for the following season. On June 27, 2020, she scored the club's first ever goal in the first tier Damallsvenskan, in a 3-2 victory over Djurgårdens. Following the 2020 season, she departed the club, after the club was relegated back to the second tier for 2021.

In December 2020, she signed a two-year contract with Djurgårdens for the 2021 and 2022 seasons. On 17 April 2021, she scored her first goal for the club, as well as being sent off with a red card later in the match, in a 1-0 victory over KIF Örebro. After the 2022 season, she departed the club.

In January 2023, she signed with Brommapojkarna. In January 2024, despite interest from clubs in Italy and other parts of Europe, she extended her contract with the club for another season. Following the expiration of her contract at the end of 2024, the two sides attempted to negotiate an extension, before ultimately deciding to part ways.

In March 2025, Olai signed with Canadian club Halifax Tides FC in the Northern Super League.

== International career ==
Olai has played with the Sweden U17 and Sweden U19 teams.

== Personal life ==
Olai is in a relationship with Finnish footballer Rasmus Schüller.
