= Megumi Nakamura =

Japanese footballer (born 2000)

Megumi Nakamura 中村恵実
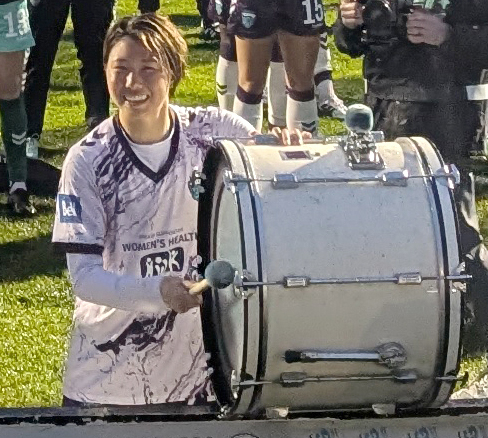
- Nakamura with Halifax Tides

Personal information
- Date of birth: 24 August 2000 (age 26)
- Place of birth: Nagano, Japan
- Height: 1.68 m (5 ft 6 in)
- Positions: Midfielder; forward

Team information
- Current team: Halifax Tides
- Number: 24

Youth career
- FC Regina
- AC Nagano Parceiro

Senior career*
Years	Team	Apps	(Gls)
2015	AC Nagano Parceiro	1	(0)
2016–2018	Tokiwagi Gakuen HS	38	(6)
2019–2024	AC Nagano Parceiro	25	(8)
2025–	Halifax Tides	23	(5)
- * Club domestic league appearances and goals as of 17 October 2025

Megumi Nakamura (Japanese: 中村恵実; born 24 August 2000) is a Japanese professional footballer who plays for Canadian Northern Super League club Halifax Tides.

== Early life ==
Megumi Nakamura played youth football with FC Regina before joining the AC Nagano Parceiro academy program.

== Club career ==
Nakamura made her WE League debut on 26 September 2021.

On 29 January 2025, Nakamura signed with Canadian side Halifax Tides FC in the newly-launched Northern Super League. On 10 June 2025, she scored as the Tides earned their first-ever victory, winning 2-1 against Ottawa Rapid FC.

== Career statistics ==
As of 17 October 2025

Appearances and goals by club, season and competition
Club	Season	League			National cup (Note: Includes appearances in the Empress's Cup)		Other (Note: Includes appearances in the Nadeshiko League Cup)		Total	
Club	Season	Division	Apps	Goals	Apps	Goals	Apps	Goals	Apps	Goals
AC Nagano Parceiro	2015	Nadeshiko League Division 2	1	0	0	0	0	0	1	0
Tokiwagi Gakuen HS	2016	Challenge League	3	0	0	0	0	0	3	0
Tokiwagi Gakuen HS	2017	Challenge League	17	1	3	0	0	0	20	1
Tokiwagi Gakuen HS	2018	Challenge League	18	5	3	0	0	0	21	5
Tokiwagi Gakuen HS	Total		38	6	6	0	0	0	44	6
AC Nagano Parceiro	2019	Nadeshiko League Division 1	2	0	0	0	4	0	6	0
AC Nagano Parceiro	2020	Nadeshiko League Division 2	16	8	0	0	0	0	16	8
AC Nagano Parceiro	2021–22	WE League	1	0	0	0	0	0	1	0
AC Nagano Parceiro	2022–23	WE League	0	0	0	0	0	0	0	0
AC Nagano Parceiro	2023–24	WE League	0	0	0	0	0	0	0	0
AC Nagano Parceiro	2024–25	WE League	6	0	1	0	6	1	13	1
AC Nagano Parceiro	Total		25	8	1	0	10	1	36	9
Halifax Tides	2025	Northern Super League	23	5	–		–		23	5
Career total			87	19	7	0	10	1	104	20
