= Sarah Taylor (soccer) =

Canadian soccer player (born 1996)

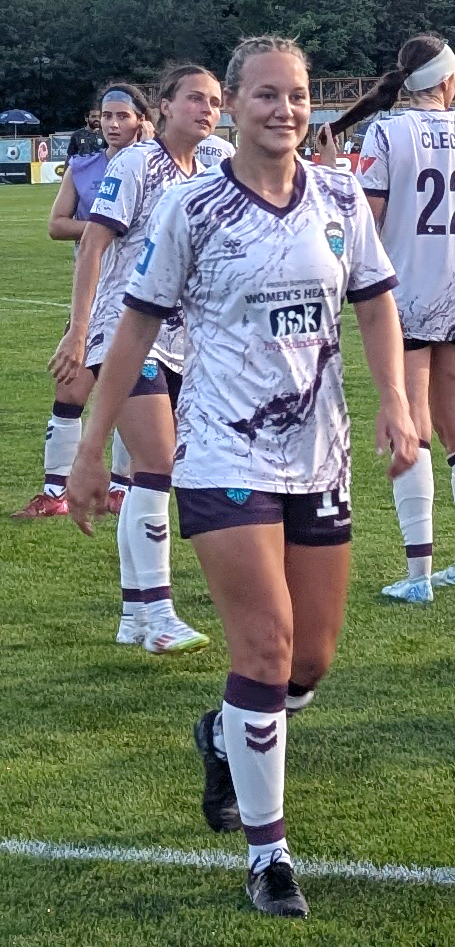
- Taylor in 2025 with Halifax Tides FC

Personal information
- Full name: Sarah Catherine Taylor
- Date of birth: December 6, 1996 (age 29)
- Place of birth: Bridgewater, Nova Scotia, Canada
- Height: 1.68 m (5 ft 6 in)
- Position: Midfielder

Team information
- Current team: Halifax Tides
- Number: 14

College career
Years	Team	Apps	(Gls)
2014–2017	Boise State Broncos	74	(2)

Senior career*
Years	Team	Apps	(Gls)
2022	Hapoel Ra'anana		
2025–	Halifax Tides	14	(0)

Managerial career
- 2019: Mount Saint Vincent Mystics (women) (assistant)
- 2021: St. Francis Xavier X-Women (assistant)
- 2023: Calgary Foothills WFC
- 2024: Calgary Blizzard WSC (assistant)
- 2024: Calgary Dinos (women) (assistant)
- * Club domestic league appearances and goals as of October 17, 2025

Sarah Catherine Taylor (born December 6, 1996) is a Canadian soccer player who plays for Halifax Tides FC in the Northern Super League.

== College career ==
In 2014, Taylor began attending Boise State University, where she played for the women's soccer team. On August 22, 2014, she scored her first collegiate goal in her debut against the Drake Bulldogs. At the end of her first season, she was named a Mountain West Conference Scholar-Athlete Award and named the team's 12th Woman of the Year and given Top Bronco Award at year-end banquet. In 2015 and 2016, she was named an Academic All-Mountain West. In 2017, she was named to the Academic All-District Team and the All-Mountain West Second Team.

== Club career ==
She began her professional career with Israeli club Hapoel Ra'anana.

In February 2025, she signed with Halifax Tides FC of the Northern Super League. On February 4, 2026, it was announced that she would remain with the Tides for the 2026 season, with head coach Stephen Hart saying “She gave us balance in midfield with her ability to break up play, protect the back line, and contribute in possession. Now fully healthy, her attitude and competitive nature should make her an important piece for us this season.”

== International career ==
In May 2016, Taylor was called up to the Canada U20 for a training camp. In October 2016, she was named to the team for the 2016 FIFA U-20 Women's World Cup.

== Coaching career ==
In April 2019, she joined Mount Saint Vincent University as an assistant coach with their women's soccer team.

In June 2021, she began became an assistant coach with the women's soccer team of St. Francis Xavier University.

In 2023, she was named the head coach of Calgary Foothills WFC in League1 Alberta. After the season, she changed roles to become the club's Foundation Phase Manager.

In 2024, she served as an assistant coach with Calgary Blizzard SC in League1 Alberta and also served as an assistant with the women's soccer team of the University of Calgary.
