= Éva Frémaux =

French footballer (born 2002)

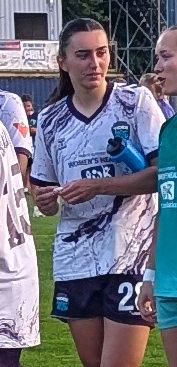
- Frémaux in 2025 with Halifax Tides

Personal information
- Date of birth: 28 March 2002 (age 24)
- Place of birth: Roubaix, France
- Height: 1.62 m (5 ft 4 in)
- Position: Defender

Team information
- Current team: Halifax Tides
- Number: 28

Youth career
- 2008–2012: IC Croix
- 2012–2017: Croix FIC
- 2017–2020: Lille

Senior career*
Years	Team	Apps	(Gls)
2019–2022	Lille	30	(2)
2022–2023	Strasbourg	18	(0)
2023–2024	Nantes	22	(1)
2025–	Halifax Tides	20	(0)

International career
2018	France U16	4	(0)
2018	France U17	1	(0)
2019	France U20	3	(0)
- * Club domestic league appearances and goals as of October 17, 2025

Éva Frémaux (born 28 March 2002) is a French footballer who plays for Halifax Tides FC in the Northern Super League.

== Early life ==
Frémaux played youth football with IC Croix and Croix FIC. At age 15, Frémaux joined the youth system of Lille.

== Club career ==
During the 2019-20 season, she made her senior debut for Lille in the second tier Division 2 Féminine. In July 2021, she extended her contract for an additional season. In June 2022, she departed the club.

In the summer of 2022, she joined Strasbourg.

In 2023, she joined Nantes. In her first season, she made 20 appearances (including 18 starts), helping the club earn promotion to the first tier. However, the following season, her playing time dropped, with her only making two appearances. At the beginning of January 2025, her departure was announced.

In January 2025, she signed with Northern Super League club Halifax Tides FC. In December 2025, she extended for the 2026 season.

== Career statistics ==
As of October 17, 2025

Club	Season	League			Playoffs		National Cup		Other		Total	
Club	Season	Division	Apps	Goals	Apps	Goals	Apps	Goals	Apps	Goals	Apps	Goals
Lille	2019-20	Division 2 Féminine	14	0	–		3	0	–		17	0
Lille	2020-21	Division 2 Féminine	4	2	–		0	0	–		4	2
Lille	2021-22	Division 2 Féminine	12	0	–		4	0	–		16	0
Lille	Total		30	2	0	0	7	0	0	0	37	2
Strasbourg	2022-23	Division 2 Féminine	18	0	–		1	0	–		19	0
Nantes	2023-24	Division 2 Féminine	20	1	–		3	0	–		23	1
Nantes	2024–25	Première Ligue	2	0	–		0	0	–		2	0
Nantes	Total		22	1	0	0	3	0	0	0	25	1
Halifax Tides FC	2025	Northern Super League	20	0	—		—		—		20	0
Career total			90	3	0	0	10	0	0	0	100	3
