= Mya Harnish =

Canadian soccer player

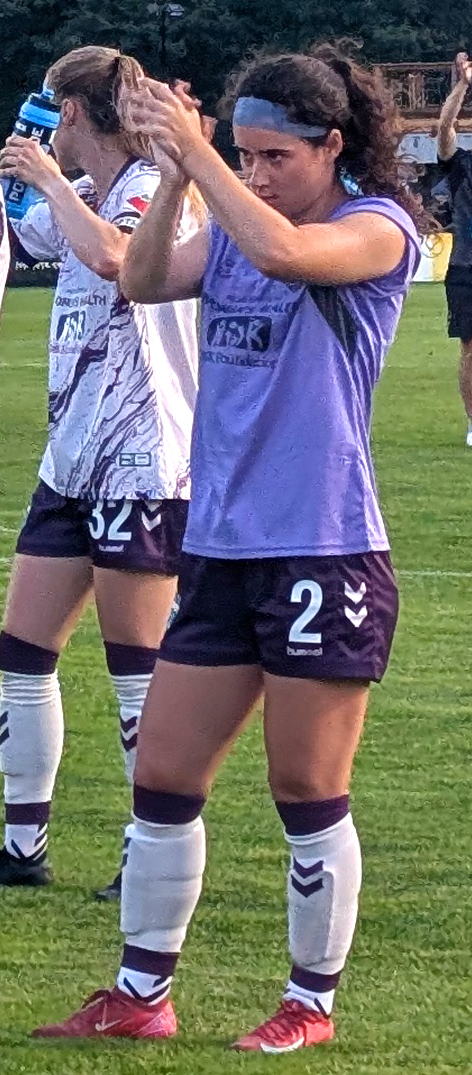
- Harnish in 2025 with Halifax Tides FC

Personal information
- Date of birth: December 27, 2001 (age 24)
- Place of birth: Lower Sackville, Nova Scotia, Canada
- Height: 1.63 m (5 ft 4 in)
- Position: Defender

Youth career
- Suburban FC

College career
Years	Team	Apps	(Gls)
2019–2024	Acadia Axewomen	60	(3)

Senior career*
Years	Team	Apps	(Gls)
2025	Halifax Tides FC	3	(0)
- * Club domestic league appearances and goals as of October 17, 2025

Mya Harnish (born December 27, 2001) is a Canadian soccer player.

== Early life ==
Harnish played youth soccer with Suburban FC.

== University career ==
In 2019, Harnish began attending Acadia University. In 2019, she was named an AUS Second Team All-Star and to the U Sports All-Rookie Team. In 2021, she was named an AUS Second Team All-Star. In 2023, she was named an AUS First-Team All-Star. In 2024, she was named the Acadia Athlete of the Week on two occasions and after the season, was named an AUS First-Team All-Star and a U Sports First-Team All-Canadian.

== Club career ==
In March 2025, Harnish signed with Halifax Tides FC in the Northern Super League.

== International career ==
In February 2017, Harnish attended a camp with the Canada U17 team.
