= Lewis Page =

Lewis Page may refer to:

- Lewis Page (English footballer) (born 1996), English footballer
- Lewis Page (Canadian soccer) (born 1967), Canadian soccer coach

== See also ==
- Lewis Page Mercier (1820–1875), English translator of Jules Verne novels
