= Sophie Guilmette =

Canadian soccer player (born 2002)

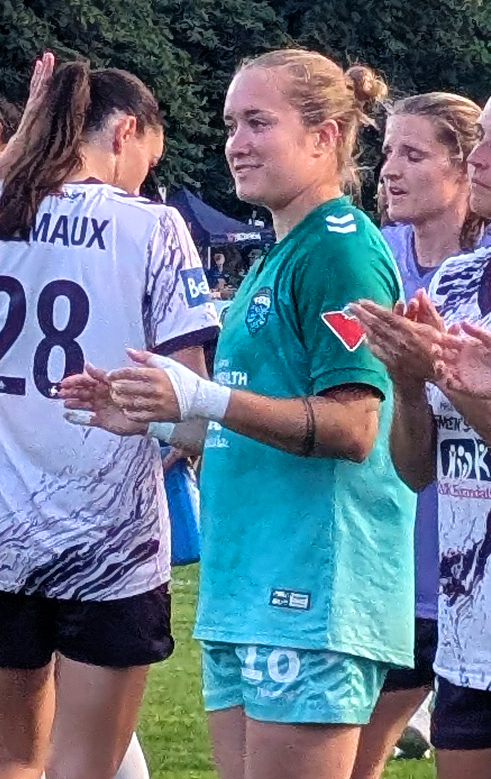
- Guilmette in 2025 with Halifax Tides FC

Personal information
- Birth name: Sophie Daphnée Marion Eliane Guilmette
- Date of birth: March 24, 2001 (age 25)
- Place of birth: Montréal, Québec, Canada
- Height: 1.68 m (5 ft 6 in)
- Position: Goalkeeper

Youth career
- CS Braves d'Ahuntsic
- AS Notre-Dame-de-Grâce
- 2016–2017: Lakeshore SC

College career
| Years | Team | Apps | (Gls) |
| 2020–2021 | Vanderbilt Commodores | 7 | (0) |
| 2022–2024 | McGill Martlets | 37 | (0) |

Senior career*
| Years | Team | Apps | (Gls) |
| 2018 | Lakers du Lac St-Louis | 10 | (0) |
| 2021–2023 | AS Blainville | 8+ | (0) |
| 2024 | CS Longueuil | 13 | (0) |
| 2025 | Halifax Tides FC | 1 | (0) |

International career
| 2016 | Canada U15 | | |
- * Club domestic league appearances and goals as of August 16, 2025

Sophie Daphnée Marion Eliane Guilmette (born March 24, 2001) is a Canadian soccer player.

== Early life ==
Guilmette played youth soccer with CS Braves d'Ahuntsic, AS Notre-Dame-de-Grâce, and Lakeshore SC. she played with Team Quebec at the 2017 Canada Summer Games, winning gold.

== University career ==
In 2019, Guilmette began attending Vanderbilt University, where she played for the women's soccer team. She redshirted her first season in 2019. She made her collegiate debut on September 20, 2020 against the Kentucky Wildcats. In 2020, she was named to the SEC Academic Honor Roll.

In 2022, she began attending McGill University, joining the women's soccer team. In 2023, she was named an RSEQ Second Team All-Star. She was also named to the President's Student-Athlete Honour Roll on two occasions.

== Club career ==
In 2018, Guilmette played with Lakers du Lac St-Louis in the Première ligue de soccer du Québec. In 2021, Guilmette began playing with AS Blainville. In 2024, she began playing with CS Longueuil.

In March 2025, she signed with Halifax Tides FC in the Northern Super League.

== International career ==
Guilmette debuted in the Canada national program in 2016. She was the starting goalkeeper for the Canada U15 at the 2016 CONCACAF Girls' U-15 Championship. She also was named to the Canada U17 for the 2016 FIFA U-17 Women's World Cup, 2018 CONCACAF Women's U-17 Championship, and 2018 FIFA U-17 Women's World Cup.
