= Gianna Creighton =

American Soccer player

Personal information
- Date of birth: June 21, 2001 (age 25)
- Place of birth: San Diego, California, United States
- Height: 5 ft 7 in (1.70 m)
- Position: Midfielder

Youth career
- Crusaders SC
- San Diego Surf SC
- Rebels SC

College career
Years	Team	Apps	(Gls)
2019–2023	UC Irvine Anteaters	87	(1)

Senior career*
Years	Team	Apps	(Gls)
2025	Halifax Tides FC	8	(0)
- * Club domestic league appearances and goals as of July 16, 2025

Gianna Creighton (born June 21, 2001) is an American soccer player who plays as a midfielder. She played college soccer for the UC Irvine Anteaters.

== Early life ==
Creighton began playing youth soccer with Crusaders SC and San Diego Surf SC. She later played with Rebels SC in San Diego.

== College career ==
In 2019, Creighton began attending the University of California, Irvine, where she played for the women's soccer team. She made her collegiate debut on August 23, 2019 against the Virginia Cavaliers. In 2021, she was named to the All-Big West Conference First Team, the All-West Region Third Team, and the Big West All-Academic Team. On September 18, 2022, she scored her first collegiate goal in a 1-1 draw with the|UC San Diego Tritons. In 2022, she was named to the All-Big West Second Team and the Big West All-Academic Team.

In 2023, after graduating the previous year, she returned for her fifth year (and fourth season after the team missed 2020 due to the COVID-19 pandemic). Ahead of the 2023 season, she was named to the Big West All-Preseason Team, followed by earning All-Big West Honorable Mention, CSC Academic All-District, and Big West All-Academic Team honors after the season. At the end of her time with UC Irvine, she finished as the program's all-time leader in games played and starts with 87 in both categories and total minutes played by any player over 4 seasons in program history, along with being named to the Big West All-Preseason Team three times, also a program record.

== Club career ==
In February 2024, Creighton was invited to train with Portland Thorns FC of the National Women's Soccer League as a replacement player, while several of the team's players were away on international duty.

In January 2025, she signed with Canadian club Halifax Tides FC in the Northern Super League. In July 2025, she agreed to a mutual termination of the remainder of her contact.
