= Anika Tóth =

Canadian-Slovak footballer (born 2002)

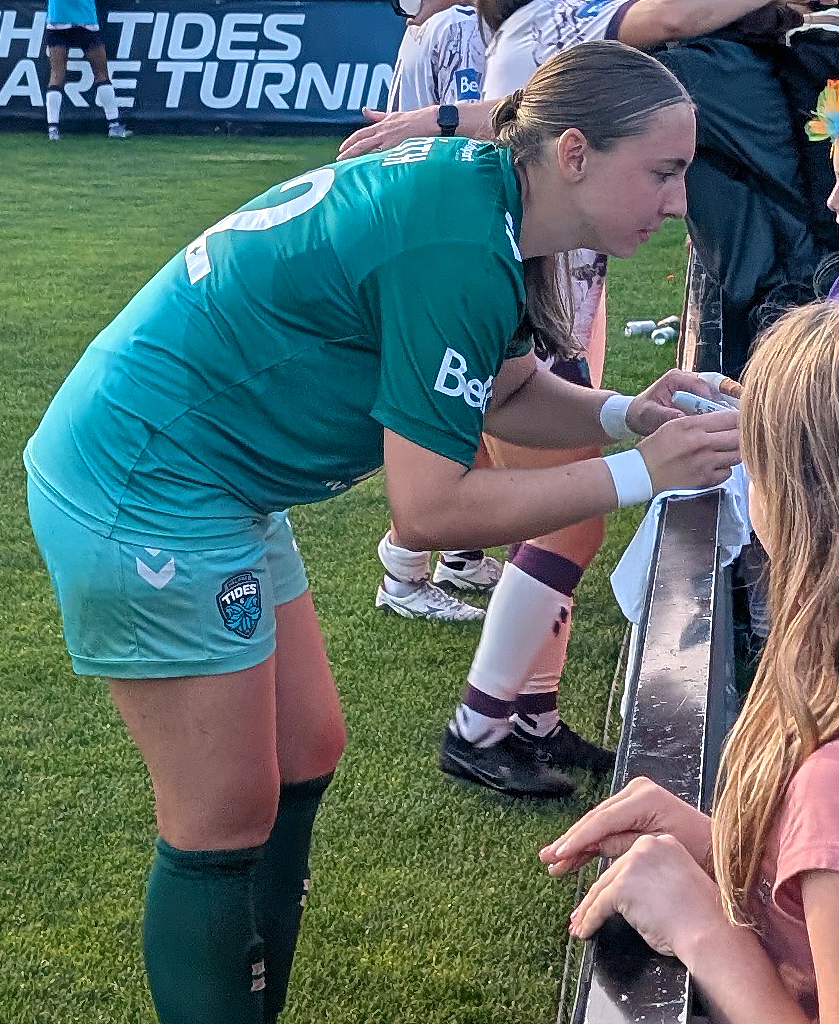
- Tóth in 2025 with Halifax Tides FC

Personal information
- Full name: Anika Katarína Huber Tóth
- Date of birth: January 15, 2002 (age 24)
- Place of birth: Toronto, Ontario, Canada
- Height: 1.76 m (5 ft 9 1/2 in)
- Position: Goalkeeper

Team information
- Current team: Halifax Tides FC
- Number: 12

Youth career
- Clarkson SC
- Hamilton United
- Oakville SC

College career
Years	Team	Apps	(Gls)
2020–2024	UAB Blazers	53	(0)

Senior career*
Years	Team	Apps	(Gls)
2022–2024	Woodbridge Strikers	31	(0)
2025–	Halifax Tides FC	19	(0)

International career^{‡}
2019	Slovakia U17	3	(0)
2019–2020	Slovakia U19	8	(0)
2023–	Slovakia	6	(0)
- * Club domestic league appearances and goals as of October 17, 2025 ‡ National team caps and goals as of April 19, 2026

Anika Katarína Huber Tóth (born January 15, 2002) is a footballer who plays for Halifax Tides FC in the Northern Super League. Born in Canada, she represents Slovakia at international level.

== Early life ==
Tóth played youth soccer in Canada with Clarkson SC, Oakville SC, and Hamilton United and also played with the Ontario provincial team.

== College career ==
In 2020, Tóth began attending the University of Alabama at Birmingham, where she played for the women's soccer team. In June 2021, she was named an FTF Female All-Canadian Freshmen First Team. In September 2023, she was named the American Athletic Conference Goalkeeper of the Week. In September 2024, she was again named the AAC Goalkeeper of the Week, and also claimed two weekly AAC Honourable Mention honours that season.

== Club career ==
From 2022 to 2024, Tóth played with the Woodbridge Strikers in League1 Ontario.

In 2025, she signed with Halifax Tides FC in the Northern Super League. She was named the league's Goalkeeper of the Year and was named to the Team of the Season.

== International career ==
Born in Canada, to a Slovak father, Tóth is eligible to play for Slovakia and Canada.

In March 2019, she made her international debut, appearing for the Slovakia U17.

In October 2020, she was called up to join the Slovakia senior team for the first time. In 2022, but was unable to join due to COVID-19 travel restrictions, but was able to join the team the following year in February 2023. She made her senior debut on February 17, 2023, against Morocco as an 85th-minute substitute.

== Career statistics ==
As of October 17, 2025

Club	Season	League			Playoffs		Domestic Cup		Other		Total	
Club	Season	Division	Apps	Goals	Apps	Goals	Apps	Goals	Apps	Goals	Apps	Goals
Woodbridge Strikers	2022	League1 Ontario	9	0	0	0	—		—		9	0
Woodbridge Strikers	2023	League1 Ontario	11	0	0	0	—		—		11	0
Woodbridge Strikers	2024	League1 Ontario Premier	11	0	—		—		0	0	11	0
Woodbridge Strikers	Total		31	0	0	0	0	0	0	0	31	0
Halifax Tides FC	2025	Northern Super League	19	0	—		—		—		19	0
Career total			50	0	0	0	0	0	0	0	50	0
