= Saorla Miller =

Canadian soccer player (born 2001)

- Miller in 2026

Personal information
- Full name: Saorla Lorraine Miller
- Date of birth: August 18, 2001 (age 25)
- Place of birth: Halifax, Nova Scotia, Canada
- Height: 5 ft 7 in (1.70 m)
- Position: Forward

Team information
- Current team: Halifax Tides
- Number: 11

Youth career
- Halifax Dunbrack SC

College career
Years	Team	Apps	(Gls)
2019–2023	Memphis Tigers	98	(24)

Senior career*
Years	Team	Apps	(Gls)
2022	Calgary Foothills		(5)
2024	Keflavík	19	(3)
2025–	Halifax Tides	25	(4)
- * Club domestic league appearances and goals as of October 17, 2025

Saorla Lorraine Miller (born August 18, 2001) is a Canadian soccer player who plays for Halifax Tides FC in the Northern Super League.

== Early life ==
Miller played youth soccer with Halifax Dunbrack SC. She played with Team Nova Scotia at the 2017 Canada Summer Games, winning a bronze medal.

== College career ==
In 2019, Miller began attending the University of Memphis, where she played for the women's soccer team. In October 2019, she was named the AAC Rookie of the Week. On August 19, 2021, she scored a hat trick against the Southeast Missouri State Redhawks, which earned her AAC Offensive Player of the Week honours. In the AAC tournament, she was named the AAC Championship Most Outstanding Offensive Player and named to the AAC All-Tournament Team. Ahead of her senior season, she was named to the AAC All-Preseason team and named the preseason favorite for Offensive Player of the Year. In October 2022, she was named the AAC Weekly Honor Roll. She returned for a fifth season in 2023, and was named to the AAC Preseason Watch List. During the season, she was named the AAC Offensive Player of the Week on two occasions and also named to the AAC Weekly Honor Roll twice. At the end of the season, she was named to the All-AAC First Team, All-South Region Second Team, and Scholar All-American Second Team, after leading the team in scoring with 12 goals. She was also named to the AAC All-Academic Team four times from 2020 to 2023.

== Club career ==
In 2022, Miller played with Calgary Foothills WFC in United Women's Soccer. She scored five goals that season.

In January 2024, she participated in the 2024 NWSL Draft, but was not selected. In February 2024, Miller signed with Icelandic club Keflavík in the Besta deild kvenna. On May 3, 2024, she scored her first league goal.

In January 2025, she signed with Northern Super League club Halifax Tides FC. She scored her first goal on May 21, 2025, in a 2-1 loss to Vancouver Rise FC.

== Personal life ==
Miller is the granddaughter of former NFL quarterback Bob Gambold.

== Career statistics ==
As of October 17, 2025

Club	Season	League			Playoffs		Domestic Cup		League Cup		Total	
Club	Season	Division	Apps	Goals	Apps	Goals	Apps	Goals	Apps	Goals	Apps	Goals
Keflavík	2024	Besta deild kvenna	19	3	—		2	2	2	1	23	6
Halifax Tides FC	2025	Northern Super League	25	4	—		—		—		25	4
Career total			44	7	0	0	2	2	2	1	48	10
