= Karima Lemire =

Canadian soccer player (born 1998)

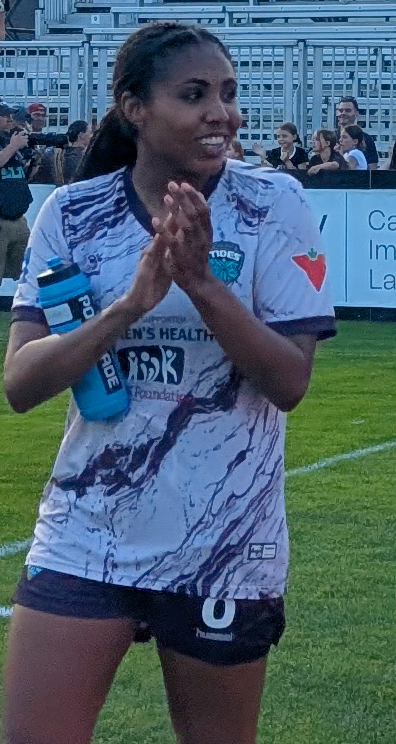
- Lemire in 2025 with Halifax Tides

Personal information
- Date of birth: October 19, 1998 (age 28)
- Place of birth: Montréal, Québec, Canada
- Height: 1.71 m (5 ft 7 1/2 in)
- Position: Midfielder

Team information
- Current team: Halifax Tides FC
- Number: 6

Youth career
- CS Longueuil
- AS Varennes

College career
Years	Team	Apps	(Gls)
2016–2018	Champlain Cavaliers		
2019–2022	UQAM Citadins		

Senior career*
Years	Team	Apps	(Gls)
2018–2019	FC Sélect Rive-Sud	25	(4)
2020	CS Longueuil	4	(2)
2021	CS Monteuil	9	(0)
2022–2023	FC Laval	10+	(0+)
2023–2024	1. FFC Turbine Potsdam	3	(0)
2024–2025	Clube de Albergaria	11	(0)
2025–	Halifax Tides FC	24	(0)

International career
2013	Canada U17		
- * Club domestic league appearances and goals as of October 17, 2025

Karima Lemire (born October 19, 1998) is a Canadian soccer player who plays for Halifax Tides FC in the Northern Super League.

== Early life ==
Lemire played youth soccer with CS Longueuil, before later joining AS Varennes.

Lemire was born and raised in Montreal, Quebec, where she began playing soccer at the age of four. She has cited the strong soccer culture in Quebec as a formative influence, including attending CF Montréal matches while growing up. She chose to focus exclusively on soccer from an early age, declining to pursue other sports.

== Playing style ==
Lemire is widely regarded as a composed and reliable presence in midfield, particularly under pressure. She has described her demeanour on the pitch as naturally calm in appearance, while acknowledging that she still experiences anxiety internally — a quality she manages largely through open communication with those close to her. Her composure has been noted by teammates and media alike, including a 2025 profile by HFX Football Post that described her as the Halifax Tides' "most trusted player." Having played professionally in two contrasting environments — Germany with 1. FFC Turbine Potsdam and Portugal with Clube de Albergaria — Lemire credits her European experience with broadening her tactical understanding and building the confidence she brings to her game.

== College career ==
In 2016, she began attending Champlain College Saint-Lambert. In 2016, she helped the side win the RSEQ collegiate bronze medal, followed by silver medals in 2017 and 2018 and also winning the Canadian Collegiate Athletic Association national title in 2018. In 2016, she was named to the RSEQ All-Star Team, and in 2018, she was named to the RSEQ All-Star team and the RSEQ All-Star team, as well as being named a CCAA All-Star and the CCAA Tournament All-Star Team.

In 2019, she began attending the Université du Québec à Montréal, where she played for the women's soccer team. At the end of her first season, she was named the RSEQ Rookie of the Year, RSEQ First Team All-Star, RSEQ All-Rookie Team and the U Sports All-Rookie Team. In both 2021 and 2022, she was named an RSEQ Second Team All-Star.

== Club career ==
In 2018, Lemire joined FC Sélect Rive-Sud in the Première ligue de soccer du Québec. In 2020, she joined CS Longueuil. In 2021, she played with CS Monteuil. In 2022, she played with FC Laval.

In October 2023, she signed with German club 1. FFC Turbine Potsdam in the second tier 2. Frauen-Bundesliga.

In August 2024, Lemire signed with Portuguese side Clube de Albergaria in the Campeonato Nacional Feminino.

In March 2025, she signed with Northern Super League club Halifax Tides FC. She began the season as a left back for the first five matches, before moving back to her regular central defensive midfielder role.

== International career ==
Lemire was named to the Canada U17 team for the 2013 CONCACAF Women's U-17 Championship and the 2014 FIFA U-17 Women's World Cup.

== Career statistics ==
As of October 17, 2025

Club	Season	League			Playoffs		National Cup		League Cup		Total	
Club	Season	League	Apps	Goals	Apps	Goals	Apps	Goals	Apps	Goals	Apps	Goals
FC Sélect Rive-Sud	2018	Première ligue de soccer du Québec	12	3	—		—		—		12	3
FC Sélect Rive-Sud	2019	Première ligue de soccer du Québec	13	1	—		—		—		13	1
FC Sélect Rive-Sud	Total		25	4	0	0	0	0	0	0	25	4
CS Longueuil	2020	Première ligue de soccer du Québec	3	1	1	1	—		—		4	2
CS Monteuil	2021	Première ligue de soccer du Québec	9	0	—		—		2	0	11	0
FC Laval	2022	Première ligue de soccer du Québec	10	0	—		—		1	0	11	0
FC Laval	2023	Ligue1 Québec	?	?	—		—		3	1	3+	1+
1. FFC Turbine Potsdam	2023–24	2. Frauen-Bundesliga	3	0	—		0	0	—		3	0
Clube de Albergaria	2024–25	Campeonato Nacional Feminino	11	0	—		1	0	2	0	14	0
Halifax Tides FC	2025	Northern Super League	24	0	—		—		—		24	0
Career total			85+	5+	1	1	1	0	8	1	95+	6+
