= Kiley Norkus =

American soccer player

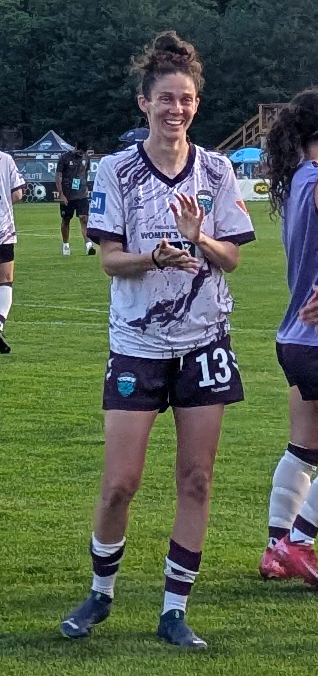
- Norkus in 2025 with Halifax Tides FC

Personal information
- Full name: Kiley Nicole Norkus
- Date of birth: September 1, 1995 (age 31)
- Place of birth: San Luis Obispo, California, United States
- Height: 5 ft 9 in (1.75 m)
- Position: Defender

Youth career
- Camarillo Eagles SC

College career
Years	Team	Apps	(Gls)
2014–2015	Cal State Northridge Matadors	36	(3)
2016–2017	Eastern Washington Eagles	29	(0)

Senior career*
Years	Team	Apps	(Gls)
2014–2015	Beach FC		
2018	Telge United	4	(0)
2018–2019	Oiartzun		
2021	Haukar	13	(0)
2022	Víkingur Reykjavik	17	(2)
2023	ASA Tel Aviv		
2024	Hibernians		(2)
2024	Calgary Foothills WFC	5	(2)
2024	Amed	6	(0)
2025	Halifax Tides FC	21	(0)
- * Club domestic league appearances and goals as of October 17, 2025

Kiley Nicole Norkus (born September 1, 1995) is an American soccer player.

== Early life ==
Norkus played youth soccer with Camarillo Eagles SC.

== College career ==
In 2013, she began attending California State University, Northridge, where she redshirted her first year. On October 26, 2014, she scored her first goal in a match against the UC Irvine Anteaters. On August 30, 2015, she scored a brace in a victory over the New Mexico State Aggies.

In 2016, she transferred to Eastern Washington University. She was named to the Big Sky Conference All-Academic Team in both 2017 and 2018

== Club career ==
In 2014 and 2015, she played with Beach FC in the Women's Premier Soccer League.

In 2018, she signed with Swedish club Telge United in the third tier Division 1 Södra Svealand.

In September 2018, she signed with in the Spanish second tier Segunda División with Oiartzun.

In April 2021, she signed with Icelandic club Haukar in the 1. deild kvenna.

In February 2022, she signed with Víkingur Reykjavik.

Afterwards, she joined Israeli club ASA Tel Aviv.

In January 2024, Norkus signed with Maltese Women's League club Hibernians. In May 2024, it was announced that she would be departing the club.

In May 2024, she joined Calgary Foothills WFC in United Women's Soccer.

Later in 2024, she joined Turkish club Amed in the Turkish Women's Football Super League.

In January 2025, she signed with Canadian club Halifax Tides FC in the Northern Super League.
