= Wanderers Amateur Athletic Club =

- Nickname: The Wanderers
- Short name: WAAC
- Founded: 1882; 144 years ago
- Dissolved: 1982; 44 years ago
- Ground: Wanderers Grounds; Halifax, Nova Scotia

The Wanderers Amateur Athletic Club (WAAC) was an amateur sports club based in Halifax, Nova Scotia, Canada. The club was first organized in 1882, and in existence until 1982.

== History ==
The Club was founded by members of the Wanderer's Cricket Team in 1882. It was initially active in cricket, track and field and rugby football. The Wanderers had their own playing field, known as Wanderers Grounds, which still exists today. A field house was built in 1896 on the city-owned grounds, which were leased for $100 per year. The field house was destroyed by fire in 1938.

The WAAC disbanded in 1982, and its assets reverted to the City of Halifax. A new WAAC was founded in 2009 by the combined Halifax Rugby Football Club and the Halifax Tars Rugby Football Club.

The legacy of the 'Wanderers' name was continued with HFX Wanderers FC, a new professional soccer club founded in 2018, who play at the Wanderers Grounds.

== Ice hockey ==
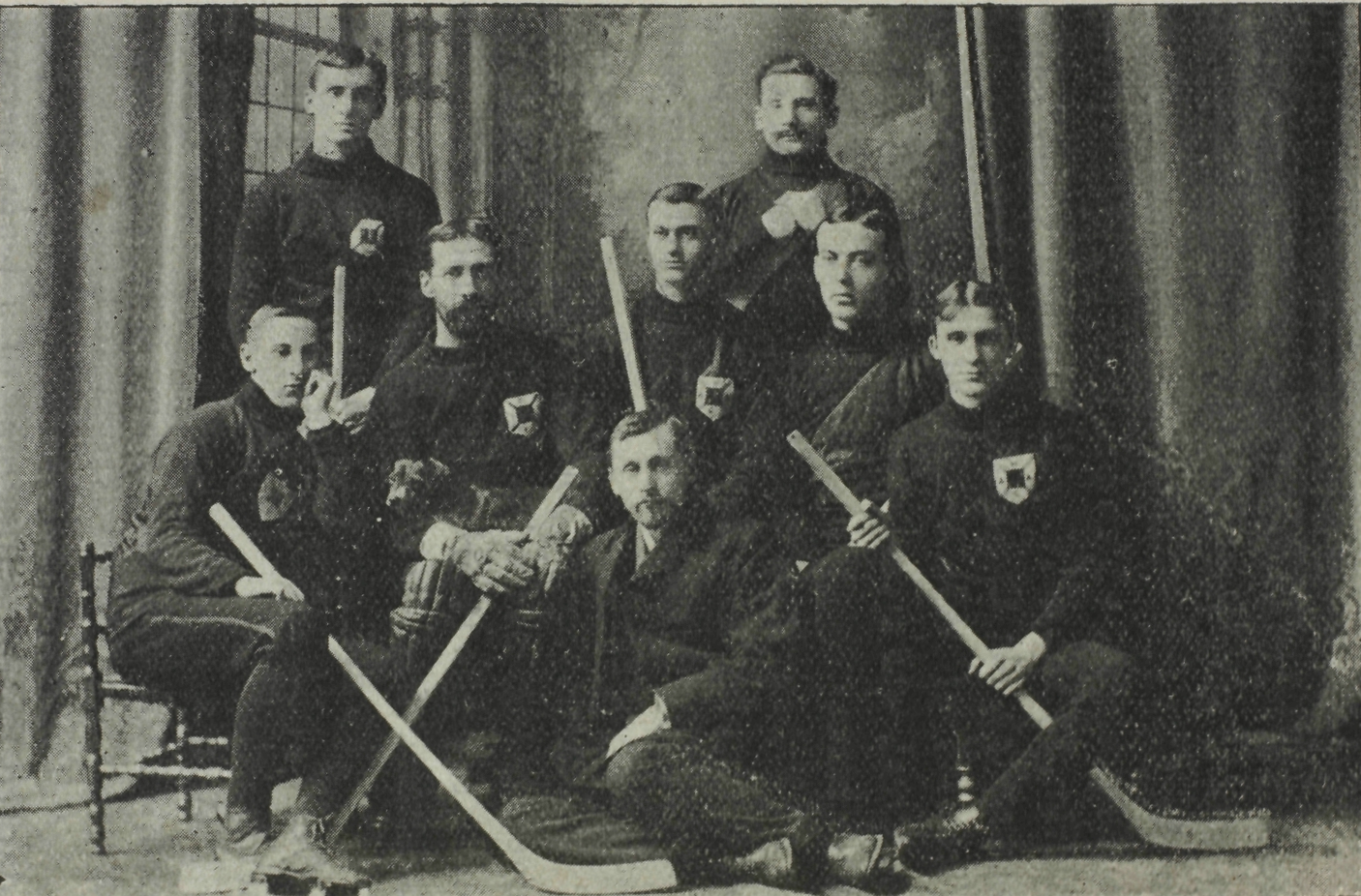
Team picture, 1899

The Wanderers sponsored an ice hockey team, which won the Starr Halifax Championships twice in the 1890s, and won the Maritime amateur championship in 1898.
