= Daphnée Blouin =

Canadian soccer player (born 2001)

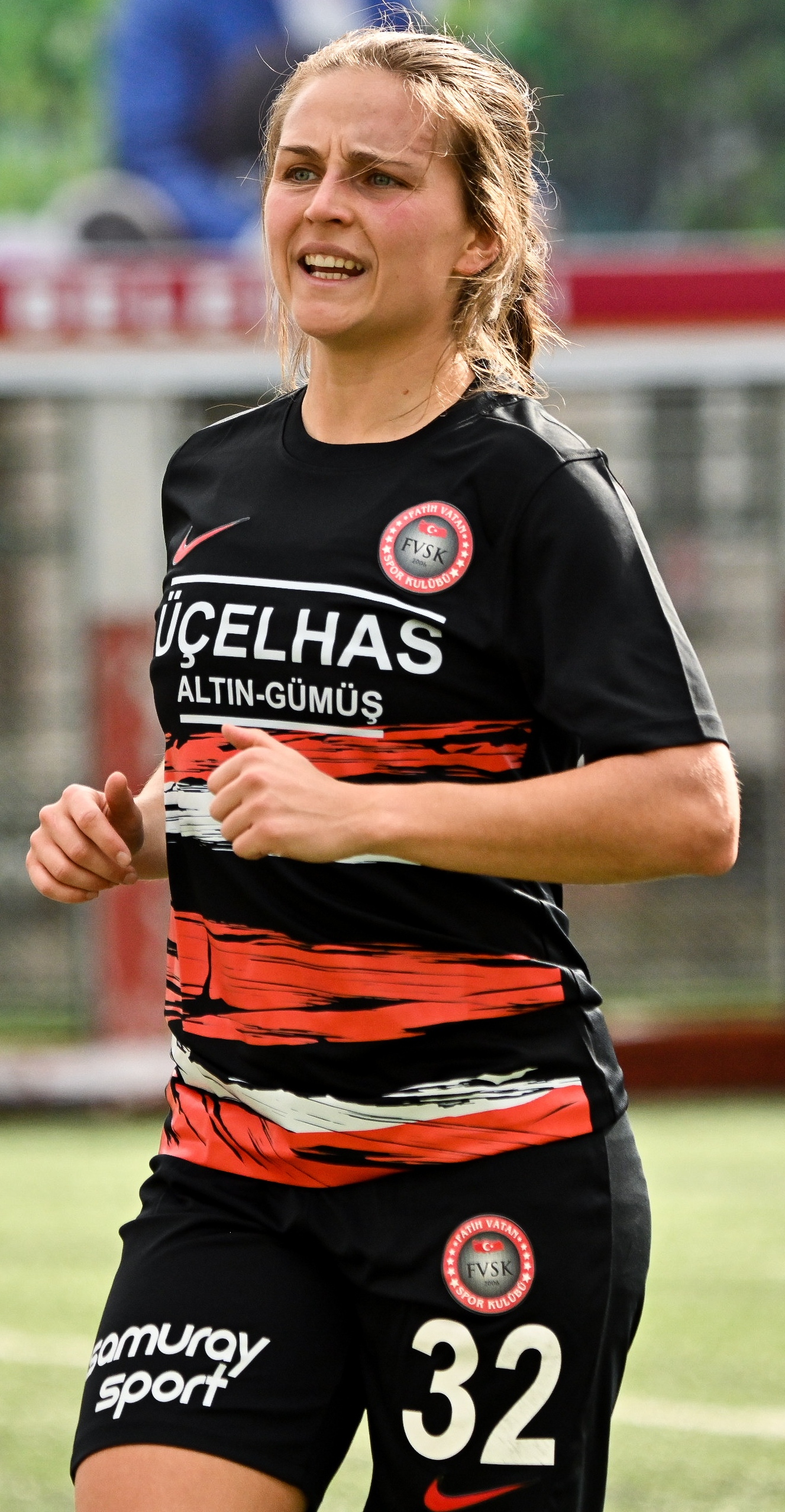
- Blouin in 2024 with Fatih Vatan

Personal information
- Date of birth: April 18, 1998 (age 28)
- Place of birth: Québec City, Québec, Canada
- Height: 1.65 m (5 ft 5 in)
- Position: Midfielder

Youth career
- Royal Sélect Beauport

College career
Years	Team	Apps	(Gls)
2015–2017	Garneau Elks		
2018–2023	Laval Rouge et Or		

Senior career*
Years	Team	Apps	(Gls)
2021	Royal Sélect Beauport	9	(0)
2022–2023	FC Laval		(8)
2024	Fatih Vatan	8	(1)
2024	Royal Sélect Beauport	7	(1)
2025	Halifax Tides	16	(1)
- * Club domestic league appearances and goals as of October 17, 2025

Daphnée Blouin (born April 18, 1998) is a Canadian soccer player.

== University career ==
Blouin attended Cégep Garneau, where she won three RSEQ provincial college titles and three CCAA National Championship titles.

In 2018, Blouin began attending the Université Laval, where she played for the women's soccer team. At the end of the 2018 season, she was named to the RSEQ All-Rookie Team. On September 18, 2021, she scored a brace in a 2-1 voctory over the Concordia Stingers. In 2021 and 2022, she was named an RSEQ Second Team All-Star. In 2023, she scored seven goals in nine games and was she was named the RSEQ Player of the Year, an RSEQ First Team All-Star and a U Sports First Team All-Star. Over her time at Laval, she won two RSEQ university Championship titles.

== Club career ==
In 2021, Blouin played with Royal Sélect Beauport in the Première ligue de soccer du Québec féminine. In 2022, she joined FC Laval.

In February 2024, Blouin signed with Fatih Vatan S.K. of the Turkish Women's Football Super League.

In the summer of 2024, she returned to her former club Royal Sélect Beauport.

In January 2025, she signed with Halifax Tides FC of the Northern Super League. She had originally trialed with Montreal Roses FC in late 2024, before signing with Halifax.
