= Lewis Page (Canadian soccer) =

Canadian soccer coach

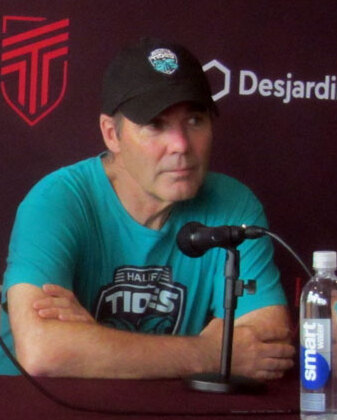
- Page in 2025

Personal information
- Date of birth: September 30, 1967 (age 59)
- Place of birth: Montréal, Québec, Canada

Managerial career
- Years: Team
- 1996–1999: UPEI Panthers (women)
- 2000–2024: UPEI Panthers
- 2000–2011: Canada U17 (women) (assistant)
- 2013: UPEI Panthers (women)
- 2020–2024: UPEI Panthers (women)
- 2024–2025: Halifax Tides FC (women)

Lewis Page (born September 30, 1967) is a Canadian soccer coach.

== Early life ==
Page was born in Montréal, Québec and moved to Chester, Nova Scotia at age 12.

== Coaching career ==
In 1996, Page was named the head coach of the women's soccer team of the University of Prince Edward Island and an assistant with the men's team. In 2000, Page was named the head coach of the men's soccer team of UPEI. In 2013, he served as the head coach of both teams for one season, and then returned to the dual role in January 2020. He was named the AUS Coach of the Year four times (2000, 2002, 2009, and 2011) and the national CIS Coach of the Year in 2002. With the men's team, he won the AUS Championship in 2002 and a bronze medal at the CIS National Championships in 2014.

Between 2000 and 2011, he served as an assistant coach with the Canada U17 women's team and other youth levels. In 2011, he served as an assistant with the Canada women's senior team and attended some men's youth camps as an assistant.

In July 2024, he was named the head coach of the Halifax Tides FC of the women's Northern Super League, ahead of the inaugural league season in 2025. On June 30, 2025, after recording one win in the club's first eight matches, Page was re-assigned to become head coach of the Tides Development Academy, with Stephen Hart taking over head coaching duties of the first team.
