= Sydney Kennedy =

Canadian soccer player (born 2001)

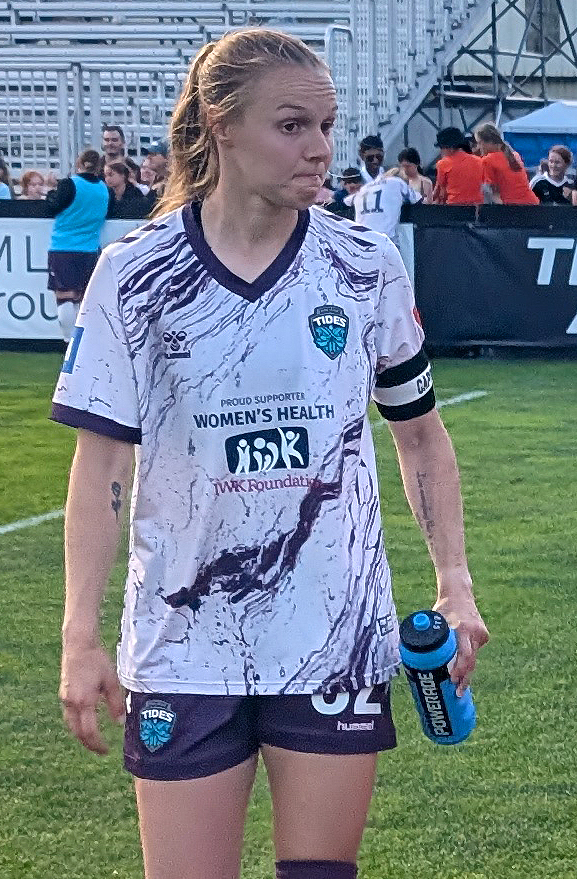
- Kennedy in 2025

Personal information
- Full name: Sydney Marcella Kennedy
- Date of birth: March 2, 2001 (age 25)
- Place of birth: Fletchers Lake, Nova Scotia, Canada
- Height: 5 ft 8 in (1.73 m)
- Position: Forward

Team information
- Current team: Halifax Tides
- Number: 32

Youth career
- Suburban FC

College career
Years	Team	Apps	(Gls)
2019–2022	Florida Gators	53	(3)
2023	Acadia Axewomen	12	(12)

Senior career*
Years	Team	Apps	(Gls)
2025–	Halifax Tides	24	(1)

International career^{‡}
2016	Canada U15	7	(6)
- * Club domestic league appearances and goals as of October 17, 2025 ‡ National team caps and goals as of August 21, 2016

Sydney Marcella Kennedy (born March 2, 2001) is a Canadian soccer player who plays for Halifax Tides FC in the Northern Super League.

== Early life ==
Kennedy played for various youth teams in Nova Scotia, before eventually joining Suburban FC. She was named the 2016 Soccer Nova Scotia Youth Female Player of the Year. She played with Team Nova Scotia at the 2017 Canada Summer Games, scoring the game-winning goal to win the bronze medal.

In addition to soccer, she was also a proficient hockey player in her youth, played on U15/U16 provincial hockey team since age 12 and winning a national hockey skills competition at age 10.

== University career ==
In 2019, Kennedy began attending the University of Florida, where she played for the women's soccer team. On October 11, 2020, she scored her first collegiate goal in a match against the Texas A&M Aggies. She also served as team captain and was awarded the women’s soccer team Leadership Award after her senior season. Over her four seasons at Florida, she was named to the Southeastern Conference Academic Honour Roll each year.

In 2023, after graduating from the University of Florida, she returned to Canada to attend Acadia University, where she played for the women's soccer team, alongside her sister. On October 13, 2023, she scored four goals in a 6-0 victory over the Saint Mary's Huskies. She led the team with 12 goals in her sole season with the school. At the end of the season, she was named an AUS First Team All-Star and a U Sports Second Team All-Canadian.

== Club career ==
In January 2025, Kennedy signed with Halifax Tides FC in the Northern Super League. Ahead of her first season as a professional, she balanced a full-time office job with training for pre-season.

== International career ==
In 2016, Kennedy played with the Canada U15 at the 2016 CONCACAF Girls' U-15 Championship, scoring six goals en route to winning a silver medal. She was later called up to a camp with the Canada U17 team.
