= Borens IK =

Swedish football club

- Full name: Borens Idrottsklubb
- Founded: 1932
- Ground: Borens IP; Motala; Sweden
- Chairman: Mikael Persson
- Head coach: Pierre 'Brassen' Walfridsson / Tobias Johansson
- League: Division 3 Nordöstra Götaland
- 2010: Division 4 Östergötland Västra, 1st (Promoted)
| Home colours | Away colours |

Borens IK is a Swedish football club located in Motala in Östergötland County.

== Background ==
Borens Idrottsklubb were founded on 25 May 1932 by men who previously played for other Motala football clubs. Arvid Lindgren became the club's first chairman and other members of the committee were Edvard Elf, Tage Kihlström, Helmer Törnqvist and Bengt Rundgren. The club currently has around 900 members. Their greatest victory was on 21 October 1933 when they defeated Hästholmen 22–0. Their heaviest defeat was in the 1944–45 season when they went down 1–11 to BK Kenty.

Since their foundation Borens IK has participated mainly in the middle and lower divisions of the Swedish football league system. The club currently plays in Division 3 Nordöstra Götaland which is the fifth tier of Swedish football. They play their home matches at the Borens IP in Motala.

Borens IK are affiliated to Östergötlands Fotbollförbund.

== Recent history ==
In recent seasons Borens IK have competed in the following divisions:

2011 – Division III, Nordöstra Götaland
2010 – Division IV, Östergötland Västra
2009 – Division IV, Östergötland Västra
2008 – Division IV, Östergötland Västra
2007 – Division IV, Östergötland Västra
2006 – Division IV, Östergötland Västra
2005 – Division III, Nordöstra Götaland
2004 – Division IV, Östergötland Västra
2003 – Division IV, Östergötland Västra
2002 – Division IV, Östergötland Västra
2001 – Division IV, Östergötland Västra
2000 – Division IV, Östergötland Västra
1999 – Division IV, Östergötland Västra

== Attendances ==
In recent seasons Borens IK have had the following average attendances:

| Season | Average attendance | Division / Section | Level |
|---|---|---|---|
| 2009 | Not available | Div 4 Östergötland Västra | Tier 6 |
| 2010 | 91 | Div 4 Östergötland Västra | Tier 6 |

* Attendances are provided in the Publikliga sections of the Svenska Fotbollförbundet website.
