= Annika Leslie =

Canadian soccer player (born 2003)

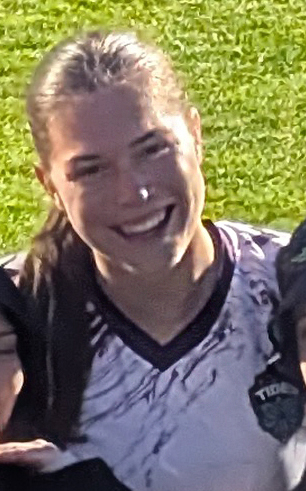
- Annika Leslie in 2025 with Halifax Tides FC

Personal information
- Full name: Annika Pasha Leslie
- Date of birth: April 22, 2003 (age 23)
- Place of birth: Ottawa, Ontario, Canada
- Height: 1.70 m (5 ft 7 in)
- Position: Defender

Team information
- Current team: Halifax Tides FC

Youth career
- Halifax City SC

College career
Years	Team	Apps	(Gls)
2021–2024	West Virginia Mountaineers	70	(2)

Senior career*
Years	Team	Apps	(Gls)
2025–	Halifax Tides FC	17	(0)

International career^{‡}
2018	Canada U15	3	(0)
2022	Canada U20	9	(0)
- * Club domestic league appearances and goals as of October 17, 2025 ‡ National team caps and goals as of August 17, 2022

Annika Pasha Leslie (born April 22, 2003) is a Canadian soccer player who plays for Halifax Tides FC in the Northern Super League.

== Early life ==
Born in Ottawa, Ontario, Leslie moved to Wellington, New Zealand when she was a year old, before returning to Canada at age five, settling in Halifax, Nova Scotia. She began playing youth soccer at age six with Halifax City SC.

== College career ==
In 2021, Leslie began attending West Virginia University, where she played for the women's soccer team. She made her collegiate debut on August 19, 2021 against the Buffalo Bulls. On October 16, 2022, she scored her first collegiate goal, scoring an Olympico directly from a corner kick, in a 3-1 victory over the Baylor Bears. On September 8, 2024, she scored another Olimpico goal, in a 1-1 draw with the Liberty Lady Flames. In October 2024, she earned Big 12 Conference Co-Defensive Player of the Week honours. At the end of the 2024 season, she was named to the All-Big 12 First Team and the All-Midwest Region Third Team. During her time at West Virginia, she was a three-time Academic All-Big 12 First Team member and a three-time CSC Academic All-District team honoree.

== Club career ==
In March 2025, she signed with Halifax Tides FC in the Northern Super League. After making 17 appearances and contributing towards 2 clean sheets during the 2025 season, it was announced on January 5, 2026 that she would be remaining with the Tides through 2026.

== International career ==
In August 2018, Leslie debuted in the Canada national program, being named to the Canada U15 for the 2018 CONCACAF Girls' U-15 Championship. In 2019, she attended camps with the Canada U17. She served as team captain of the U17s during their 2019 Mexico tour.

In 2022, she was named to the Canada U20 team for the 2022 CONCACAF Women's U-20 Championship (winning bronze) and the 2022 FIFA U-20 Women's World Cup.
