= Tiffany Cameron =

Canadian-Jamaican footballer (born 1991)

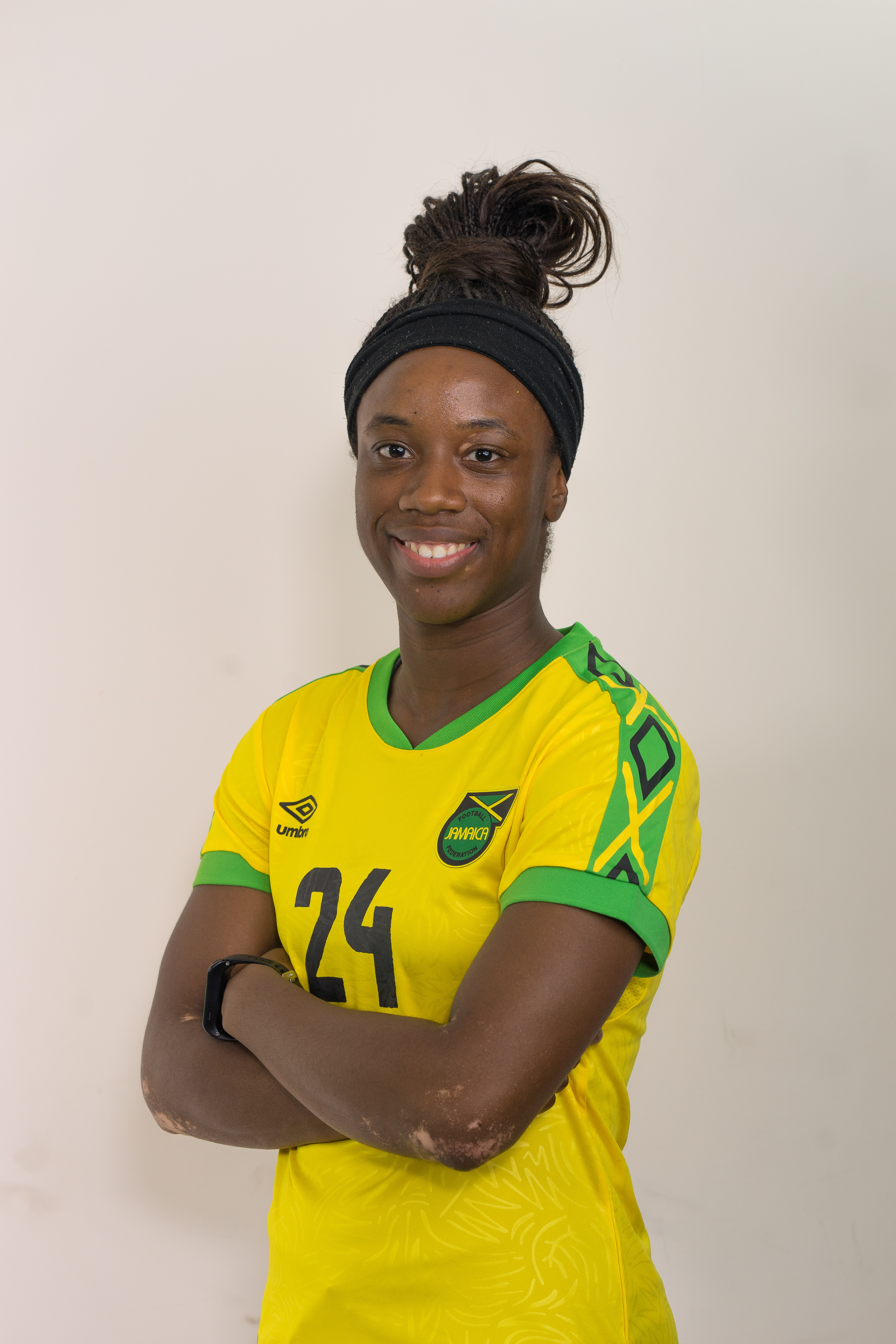
- Cameron in 2019

Personal information
- Full name: Tiffany Devonna Cameron
- Date of birth: 16 October 1991 (age 35)
- Place of birth: Toronto, Ontario, Canada
- Height: 1.68 m (5 ft 6 in)
- Position: Forward

Team information
- Current team: Halifax Tides FC
- Number: 33

Youth career
- North Mississauga SC

College career
Years	Team	Apps	(Gls)
2009–2012	Ohio State Buckeyes		

Senior career*
Years	Team	Apps	(Gls)
2009–2011	Toronto Lady Lynx	22	(9)
2013	Seattle Reign FC	7	(0)
2013	FC Kansas City	1	(0)
2014	1899 Hoffenheim	7	(1)
2014	Ottawa Fury		
2015	Apollon Limassol	3	(3)
2015–2016	F.C. Ramat HaSharon	23	(35)
2016–2017	Borussia Mönchengladbach	21	(0)
2017–2018	FF USV Jena	14	(1)
2018	Vittsjö GIK	5	(0)
2019	Stabæk	20	(3)
2020–2023	Ferencváros	13	(5)
2023–2025	Real Betis	53	(8)
2025–	Halifax Tides FC	12	(1)

International career^{‡}
2008	Canada U17	9	(5)
2013	Canada	6	(0)
2019–	Jamaica	26	(6)
- * Club domestic league appearances and goals as of 17 October 2025 ‡ National team caps and goals as of 3 March 2026

Tiffany Devonna Cameron (born 16 October 1991) is a professional footballer who plays as a forward and a midfielder for Northern Super League club Halifax Tides FC. Born in Canada, she plays for the Jamaica women's national team, after previously representing Canada.

== Early life ==
Born in Toronto, Ontario to Jamaican parents Yvonne Brown and Donovan Cameron, Cameron attended St. Joseph's Secondary School in Mississauga, Ontario, where she played basketball for three years and soccer for one year.

=== Ohio State University ===
A NSCAA second team All-American and two-time first team All-Big Ten selection, Cameron left Ohio State as the Buckeyes' all-time leading goal scorer with 40 and earned 96 career points, also the most in the school's history. During her senior year in 2012, she led the Buckeyes with 21 goals, breaking the previous school record of 13. Cameron's nine game-winning goals were the most in the country and her 19 career game-winners tied for fourth-most in Big Ten history.

== Playing career ==
=== Club ===
==== NWSL: Seattle Reign FC and FC Kansas City, 2013 ====
In February 2013, Tiffany Cameron signed with the Seattle Reign FC for the inaugural season of the NWSL.

On 19 June 2013 Seattle Reign FC released Tiffany Cameron and Lyndsey Patterson shortly after signing with Megan Rapinoe, Stephanie Cox and Kennya Cordner due NWSL rules. On June 26, 2013, Cameron signed with FC Kansas City.

==== TSG 1899 Hoffenheim, 2014 ====
On 2 February 2014, Cameron signed for German team TSG 1899 Hoffenheim .

==== Later career ====
Later in 2014, she played for Ottawa Fury Women.

On 9 March 2015, Cameron signed with Apollon Limassol to participate in the UEFA Champions League group stage matches in August. She made three Champions League appearances and scored three goals. Her team needed either a win or tie in their last match in order to move on to the round of 32 and failed to do so.

On 1 October 2015, Cameron signed with F.C. Ramat HaSharon in the Israeli top-division Israeli First League. She won the golden boot, scoring 38 goals in 24 matches and helped her team capture their first ever League Championship.

On 7 June 2016, Cameron signed with Borussia Mönchengladbach who was promoted to the German Bundesliga for the 2016/2017 season.

On 3 July 2025, Cameron was announced at Halifax Tides FC.

== International career ==
=== Canada ===
Cameron earned her first three caps with the Canada women's national soccer team in January 2013 during the Four Nations Tournament in China. She previously represented Canada as a member of the Canada U-17 women's national team. She played in four matches at the FIFA U-17 Women's World Cup, held in Auckland, New Zealand where she started all four matches and helped the team to the quarterfinal round. She also played in the CONCACAF U17 championships in 2008 in Trinidad and Tobago and led the bronze medal-winning Canadian team in scoring. Tiffany also won a bronze medal with Ontario at the 2007 U16 Girls National All-Star Championship, an event where she won the Top Scorer award.

=== Jamaica ===
As the six matches Cameron played for Canada at senior level were all friendlies, she could still change her affiliation to the Jamaica women's national team. Following the historic FIFA Women's World Cup qualification by the Reggae Girlz, she was named to the training camp roster in January 2019. She made her debut in a 1–0 friendly win against Chile on 28 February 2019.

=== International goals ===
Scores and results list Jamaica's goal tally first

No.	Date	Venue	Opponent	Score	Result	Competition
1	30 September 2019	National Stadium, Kingston, Jamaica	Cuba	5–0	12–1	2020 CONCACAF Women's Olympic Qualifying Championship qualification
2	30 September 2019	National Stadium, Kingston, Jamaica	Cuba	6–0	12–1	2020 CONCACAF Women's Olympic Qualifying Championship qualification
3	6 October 2019	National Stadium, Kingston, Jamaica	Saint Lucia	7–0	11–0	2020 CONCACAF Women's Olympic Qualifying Championship qualification
4	4 February 2020	H-E-B Park, Edinburg, United States	Saint Kitts and Nevis	2–0	7–0	2020 CONCACAF Women's Olympic Qualifying Championship
5	20 February 2022	Kirani James Stadium, St. George's, Grenada	Grenada	1–0	6–1	2022 CONCACAF W Championship qualification
6	12 April 2022	Sabina Park, Kingston, Jamaica	Dominican Republic	3–1	5–1	2022 CONCACAF W Championship qualification

== Music career ==
Cameron has rapped since college and performs under the name Tiff.

In 2026, Cameron created "Victory," an anthem for the Northern Super League, Canada's professional women's soccer league. The song featured vocals from reggae musician, Jah'Mila.

== Personal life ==
Cameron was diagnosed with vitiligo when she was 24.

== See also ==
- List of association football players capped by two senior national teams
