= Wanderers Grounds =

Sporting complex in Halifax, Nova Scotia

- The Kitchen
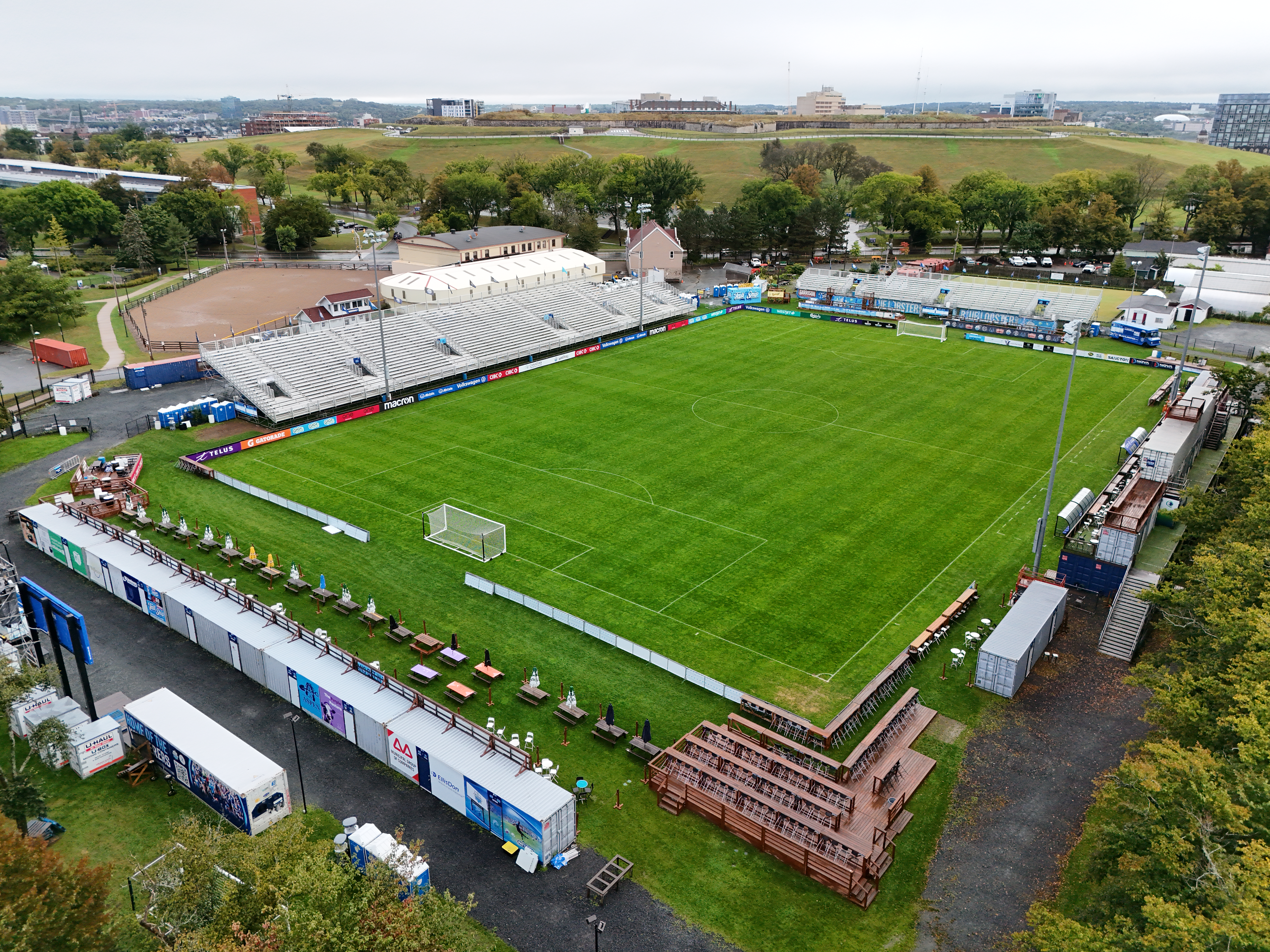
- Wanderers Grounds in 2024
- Interactive map of Wanderers Grounds
- Location: Halifax, Nova Scotia
- Coordinates: 44.6444°N 63.5836°W
- Owner: Halifax Regional Municipality
- Capacity: 6,200 (1957–2022); 6,500 (2022–2025); 7,500 (2025–present)
- Surface: Grass

Construction
- Opened: 19th century
- Renovated: 2018

Tenants
- Halifax Tides FC (NSL) (2025–present); HFX Wanderers FC (CPL) (2019–present); Nova Scotia Keltics (RCSL) (1998–2008); Halifax Pelham Canadians (NSSBL) (1977–2008)

Wanderers Grounds is a sporting complex in Halifax, Nova Scotia, and home to professional soccer clubs HFX Wanderers FC and Halifax Tides FC of the Canadian Premier League and Northern Super League respectively.

The grounds are part of the Halifax Commons. The land was used in the 1880s by the Halifax Wanderers Amateur Athletic Club (WAAC) and was their home grounds for the sports of rugby and lawn bowling. Leased to the club in the 1800s, the club failed to pay its lease fees during the Second World War and the land's use reverted to the City of Halifax (Halifax Regional Municipality) who have maintained it since then.

The Wanderers Grounds was also the home of the Halifax Pelham Canadians of the Nova Scotia Senior Baseball league 1977–2008. Years prior, Babe Ruth made an appearance at the grounds in 1942 during a navy baseball game between Halifax and Toronto. He faced Halifax pitcher Awkie Titus but failed to hit a home run.

The field house, built by the club in 1896, was destroyed by fire. It was replaced by the Navy League Dry Canteen, which was going to be rehabilitated in the 21st century, but was considered too structurally unsound. The plan to build a clubhouse has been put on an indeterminate hiatus.

On August 31, 1957, Wanderers Grounds hosted Canada Soccer's first ever Challenge Trophy match played east of Montreal. The local side Halifax Shipyards lost 8–2 to the eventual national champions, Montreal Ukraina.

On June 20, 2017, Halifax city councillors unanimously approved the construction of a temporary stadium at the Grounds, for a future Canadian Premier League professional soccer team. In May 2018, that team was confirmed to be named HFX Wanderers FC, who began play in 2019.

In 2023 the Wanderers introduced a new plan for a permanent stadium at wanderers grounds which would seat 8,500. They introduced the plan to the Halifax City Council in late 2023.

For the 2025 season the Wanderers Ground was expanded from a capacity of 6,500 to 7,500.

== Sports usage ==
Rugby football match played on the historical Wanderers' Grounds

The field has been used for matches of soccer, cricket, matches of rugby football, baseball and track and field championships among other sports.

=== Rugby union ===
Date	Home	Score	Away	Competition	Attendance
October 12, 1899	United Services (Canada)	0–10	Ireland	1899 Ireland Tour	–
October 14, 1899	Wanderers (Canada)	3–16	Ireland	1899 Ireland Tour	–
October 16, 1899	Halifax (Canada)	5–0	Ireland	1899 Ireland Tour	–
June 23, 2018	Canada	17–42	United States	2018 June test	6,200
October 20, 2018	Ontario Arrows (Canada)	40–14	(United States) New England Free Jacks	Major League Rugby	–
July 2, 2022	Canada	45–0	Belgium	2022 mid-year rugby union tests	4,412

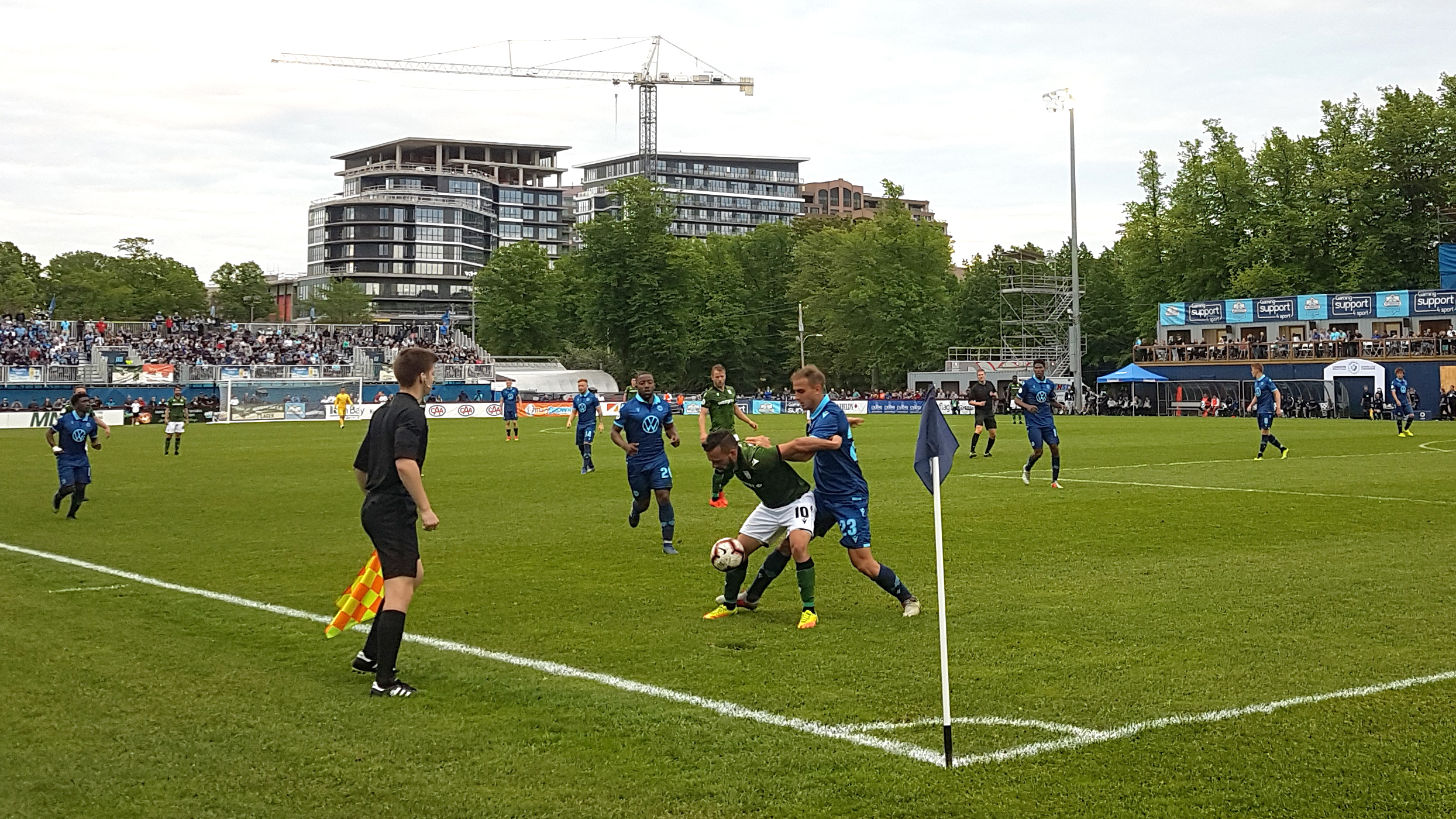
Canadian Premier League action in June 2019

== See also ==
- List of Canadian Premier League stadiums
