= Stephen Hart (footballer) =

Trinidad and Tobago footballer and manager

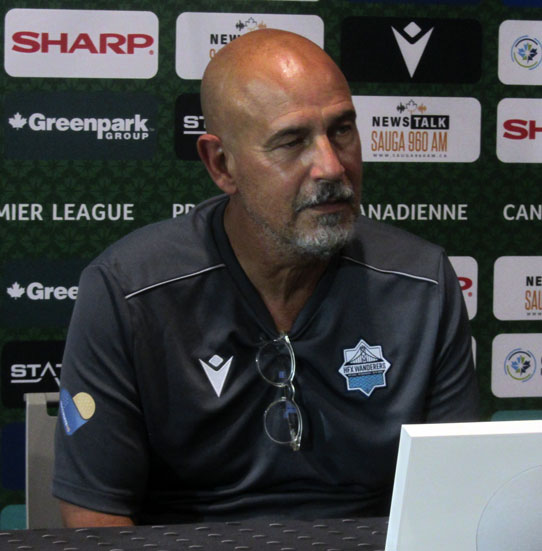
- Hart in 2021

Personal information
- Full name: Stephen Simon Hart
- Date of birth: 15 March 1960 (age 66)
- Place of birth: San Fernando, Trinidad and Tobago
- Height: 1.85 m (6 ft 1 in)
- Position: Midfielder

Youth career
- 1975–1979: San Fernando Hurricanes

College career
Years	Team	Apps	(Gls)
1981–1985	Saint Mary's Huskies		

Senior career*
Years	Team	Apps	(Gls)
1979–1980	Texaco		
1982	San Fernando Strikers		

International career
1980	Trinidad and Tobago	7	(0)

Managerial career
- 1988–1989: King of Donair (player-coach)
- 1993–2001: King of Donair
- 1997–1999: Saint Mary's Huskies women
- 1997: Canada U23 (assistant)
- 2000–2001: Canada U17 (assistant)
- 2002: Canada U20
- 2002–2007: Canada U17
- 2005–2006: Canada (assistant)
- 2006–2007: Canada (interim)
- 2007–2008: Canada (assistant)
- 2009: Canada (interim)
- 2009–2012: Canada
- 2013–2016: Trinidad and Tobago
- 2018–2022: HFX Wanderers
- 2024–2025: Portland Thorns (women) (assistant)
- 2025–: Halifax Tides FC (women)
- * Club domestic league appearances and goals

Stephen Simon Hart (born 15 March 1960) is a Trinidadian football manager and former player who is the head coach of Halifax Tides FC of the Northern Super League.

As a player, Hart began his career with the San Fernando Hurricanes before joining Professional Football League club Texaco in 1979. Leaving Trinidad and Tobago for Canada to study at Saint Mary's University, he represented the university team as well as the Halifax Privateers. Hart joined the San Fernando Strikers briefly before six years with King of Donair. He ended his playing career with Americas.

As a coach, Hart first took over at King of Donair as a player-manager in 1988. He returned to Saint Mary's University as coach of the Huskies women's team, before becoming technical director of Soccer Nova Scotia. Between 2004 and 2012, Hart undertook several roles with the Canadian Soccer Association from under-17 to senior level. In December 2009, he was named head coach of the Canadian national team, and in June 2013 took charge of the Trinidad and Tobago national team. In June 2018, he was named the inaugural head coach of HFX Wanderers FC of the Canadian Premier League. On 13 October 2022 it was announced that the Wanderers had parted ways with Hart.

== Club career ==
Hart spent his early playing career in his native Trinidad and Tobago, and after progressing in the youth ranks of the San Fernando Hurricanes, joined Professional Football League club Texaco in 1979.

He spent a year with the Halifax Privateers in an amateur league in Halifax, Nova Scotia before returning to Trinidad to play for the San Fernando Strikers. He then returned to Halifax playing for amateur clubs King of Donair in 1983 and Americas.

After moving to Halifax, Nova Scotia to continue his education, Hart also played for the Saint Mary's Huskies, the university soccer team, and was named an Atlantic University Sport all-star midfielder. In 2016, Hart was recognised in the Saint Mary's University Sport Hall of Fame.

== International career ==
In 1980, Hart was called up to the Trinidad and Tobago national team. He earned seven caps.

== Coaching career ==
=== Early career ===
Hart began his coaching career while in university, volunteering his time to coach children. He took his first coaching position in 1989 as a player-manager for semi-professional club King of Donair. Hart coached the team to four consecutive league titles and six cups.

In 1993, he was named technical director of Soccer Nova Scotia and remained in the position for eight years. Hart also served as Nova Scotia's head coach to win bronze medals at the 1993 Canada Games and 2001 Canada Games.

Hart returned to Saint Mary's University to coach the Saint Mary's Huskies women's team for four years.

=== Canada ===
In September 1997, Hart served as assistant coach for the Canada U23 national team at the Jeux de la Francophonie. He was named Canada U17 national team assistant coach in April 2000, and after two years was promoted to head coach of the U17s and Canada U20 national team. He remained with the U17s until May 2007.

Hart was named Canada national team assistant coach in July 2005 under Frank Yallop, and in 2006, stepped in as the senior team's interim coach. He led Canada to a semi-final spot in the CONCACAF Gold Cup but was replaced by Dale Mitchell ahead of 2010 FIFA World Cup qualification.

In April 2009, Hart was named as interim head coach for a second time after the departure of Mitchell. He was named permanent head coach for the first time in December 2009. Hart resigned in October 2012 after suffering an 8–1 loss to Honduras in 2014 FIFA World Cup qualification.

=== Trinidad and Tobago ===
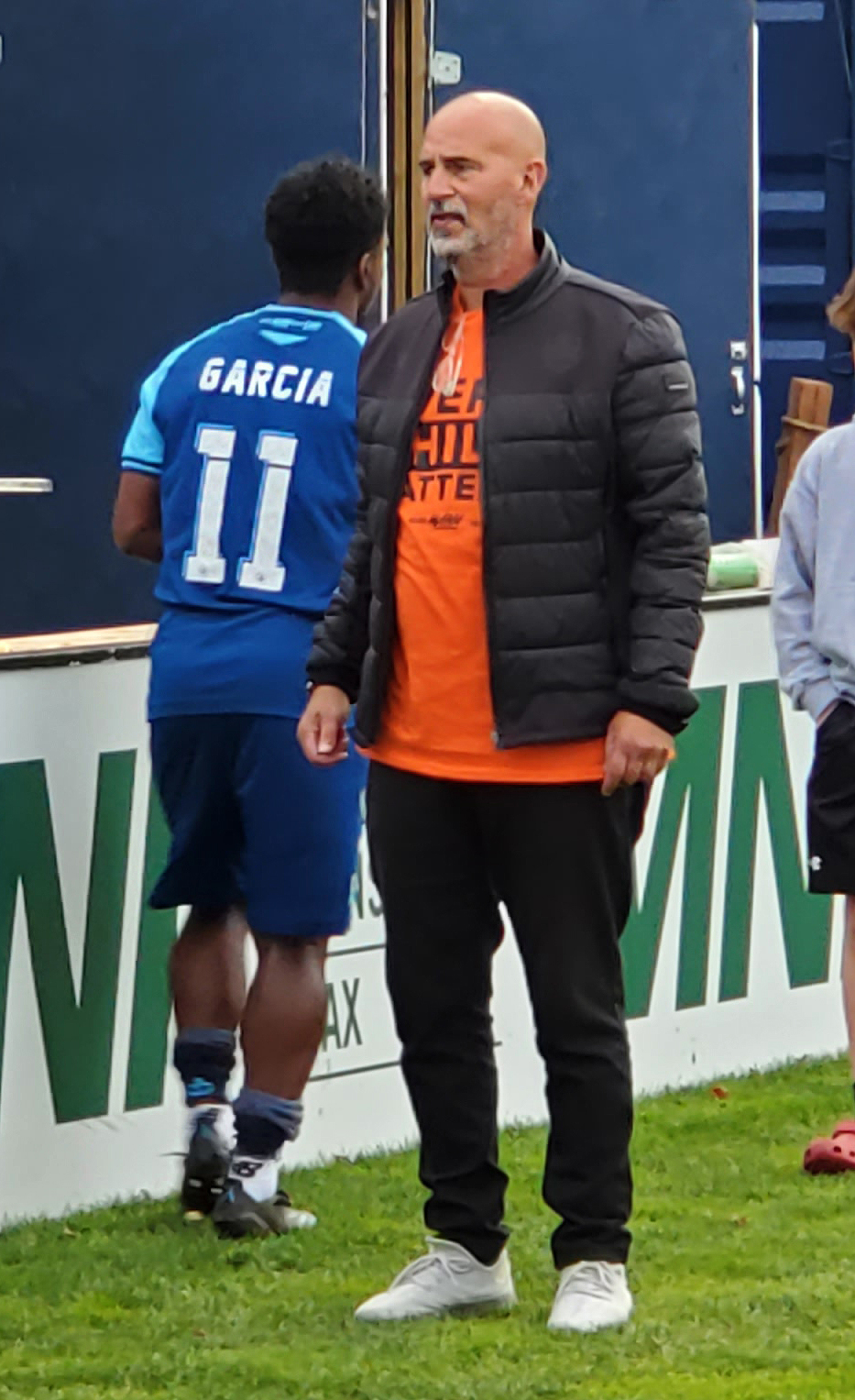
Stephen Hart as head coach of HFX Wanderers FC after a match in 2022.

In June 2013, Hart was appointed as manager of the Trinidad and Tobago national team. He was fired in November 2016 and replaced by Belgian coach Tom Saintfiet.

=== HFX Wanderers ===
On 28 June 2018, Hart was announced as the first head coach of Canadian Premier League club HFX Wanderers FC. At the end of the 2022 season, it announced that the Wanderers had parted ways with Hart.

=== Portland Thorns FC ===
On 4 October 2024, Hart was announced as the assistant coach of the National Women's Soccer League club Portland Thorns FC.

=== Halifax Tides FC ===
On June 30, 2025, Hart was named interim head coach of Halifax Tides FC in the Northern Super League. His position was confirmed permanently in December 2025, following the Tides' last-place finish in the 2025 season.

== Personal life ==
Hart was born in San Fernando, Trinidad and Tobago, and grew up in Marabella and La Romaine. He attended the San Fernando Boys' Government School and St Benedicts College, and graduated from St Mary's University in 1985 with a degree in marine biology.

He is a long-time Halifax resident and lives with his wife, a Nova Scotia native, and their three daughters.

== Managerial statistics ==
As of 8 April 2022

Team	From	To	Record				
Team	From	To	G	W	D	L	Win %
Canada U17	April 2002	May 2007	10	4	1	5	40.00
Canada (interim)	6 September 2006	21 June 2007	10	5	1	4	50.00
Canada	30 May 2009	18 October 2012	35	15	9	11	42.86
Trinidad and Tobago	18 June 2013	24 November 2016	43	16	12	15	37.21
HFX Wanderers	28 June 2018	13 October 2022	76	23	26	27	30.26
Total			174	63	49	62	36.21

== Honours ==
=== Club ===
HFX Wanderers

- Canadian Premier League
  - Runners-up: 2020

=== Individual ===
- Canadian Premier League Coach of the Year: 2020
