= Halifax Tides FC =

Women's soccer club in Halifax, Nova Scotia

- Founded: 2024
- Stadium: Wanderers Grounds; Halifax, Nova Scotia
- CEO: Courtney Sherlock
- Coach: Stephen Hart
- League: Northern Super League
- 2026: Regular season, 5th Playoffs, DNQ
- Website: tidesfc.ca
Home colours	Away colours

Halifax Tides FC is a professional women's soccer club based in Halifax, Nova Scotia. It competes in the Northern Super League, in the highest level of the Canadian soccer league system, and is the first and only professional women's soccer club in Atlantic Canada. The club's colours are ocean cyan, granite purple, and moonlight grey, and secondary colours, storm purple, night sky. Its crest references the saltire of the flag of Nova Scotia, with the crashing tides, and the badge takes a ship shape to represent it's port city. The Tides play their home games at the Wanderers Grounds in downtown Halifax.

== History ==
After discussions between a consortium of Halifax businesspeople and the Northern Super League – which was then provisionally known as Project 8 – began in late 2023, the club was first incorporated as Atlantic Women's FC Limited in early 2024, as one of the league's six founding franchises. Its status as a member of the league was publicly announced by the league in April, becoming its fourth member after Vancouver, the Calgary Wild, and AFC Toronto. The club's branding was unveiled through an event in downtown Halifax celebrating the club's "launch" on June 13, 2024.

== Identity ==
The Tides' colours are "ocean cyan", "granite purple", and "ship grey". Its crest depicts the saltire on the flag of Nova Scotia as a pair of colliding waves in front of a ship's bow. The ship forms the outline of the crest "as a reminder to always propel forward", while the Moon is depicted at its centre, allegorising the club's intended impact on the local community to the Moon's tides. Four vertical stripes decorate the base of the crest, representing the four predecessors of the Halifax Regional Municipality prior to their amalgamation in 1996: Halifax, Bedford, Dartmouth, and Halifax County. The crest was first registered with the Canadian Intellectual Property Office in April 2024.

== Stadium ==
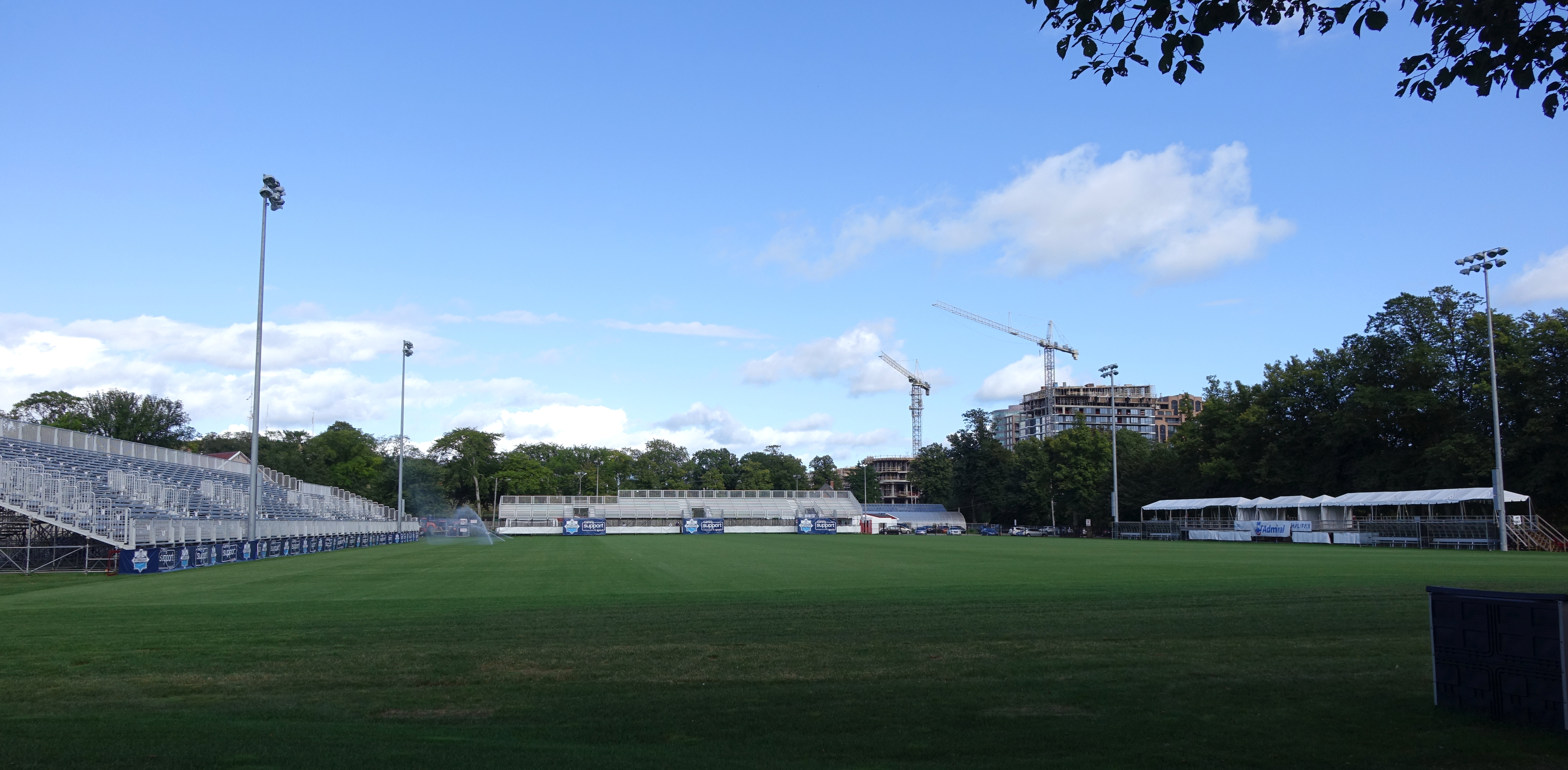
The Tides play their home games at the Wanderers Grounds, a "pop-up" stadium in downtown Halifax.

The Tides play their home games at the Wanderers Grounds in downtown Halifax. The Wanderers Grounds is a natural grass field located between the Citadel Hill and the Halifax Public Gardens, upon which a 6,500-seat "pop up" stadium was built in 2018 for the HFX Wanderers of the Canadian Premier League. The Wanderers are currently pursuing a CA$40 million upgrade of the venue with 8,500-seat permanent grandstands.

== Organization ==
Courtney Sherlock, a veterinarian and entrepreneur, serves as the Halifax Tides' chief executive officer (CEO). She was one of the co-founders of the club alongside former national team player Mary Beth Bowie, and businesspeople Adam Baggs, Tara Larsen, Andrea Thompson, Amanda Sparkes, and Miriam Zitner. Sherlock was introduced to Zitner through a mutual friend who recognized that both families had children who played soccer. Despite not having an interest in soccer herself, Sherlock was quickly motivated to offer her leadership after joining the club. Val Malone serves as the club's president, while Acadia Axewomen head coach Amit Batra serves as its sporting director, former UPEI Panthers player Danae latrou-Davis as its marketing director, and Ally Pedvis as its business development manager.

== Players and staff ==
=== Players ===
As of April 19, 2026

Note: Flags indicate national team as defined under FIFA eligibility rules; some limited exceptions apply. Players may hold more than one non-FIFA nationality.

No.	Pos.	Nation	Player
1	GK	CAN	Rylee Foster
2	DF	JAM	Naya Cardoza
3	DF	USA	Sheyenne Allen
4	MF	CAN	Julia Benati
5	DF	CAN	Annika Leslie
6	MF	CAN	Karima Lemire
7	DF	NOR	Julie Pedersen
8	MF	KOR	Cho So-Hyun
10	MF	USA	Kat Jordan
11	FW	CAN	Saorla Miller
12	GK	SVK	Anika Tóth

No.	Pos.	Nation	Player
13	GK	CAN	Samantha St. Croix
14	MF	CAN	Sarah Taylor
16	DF	USA	Addison Weichers
21	MF	NOR	Synne Moe
24	MF	JPN	Megumi Nakamura
28	DF	FRA	Éva Frémaux
30	FW	USA	Jordyn Rhodes
32	FW	CAN	Sydney Kennedy
33	FW	JAM	Tiffany Cameron
44	DF	CAN	Julianne Vallerand
98	FW	CAN	Stella Downing

Counts as a domestic player as she also holds Canadian nationality

=== Current staff ===
As of June 30, 2025

Executive
Chief Executive Officer	Courtney Sherlock
President	Val Malone
Technical director	Amit Batra
Coaching staff
Head coach	Stephen Hart
First assistant coach	Katie Barrott
Second assistant coach	Sophie Clough

=== Head coach history ===
As of June 30, 2025

Coach	Nation	Tenure	Record				
Coach	Nation	Tenure	G	W	D	L	Win %
Lewis Page	Canada	July 3, 2024 – June 30, 2025	8	1	1	6	12.50
Stephen Hart^{2}	Trinidad and Tobago	June 30, 2025 – present	0	0	0	0	—

1.Includes league and playoff games

2.Hart was signed on an initial interim contract, before being given the permanent role in December 2025.

== Supporters ==
The independent supporters group for the Halifax Tides are The Beacons.
