= Northern Super League =

Professional women's soccer league in Canada

Northern Super League; Super Ligue du Nord
- Organising body: Project 8 Sports, Inc.
- First season: 2025
- Country: Canada
- Confederation: CONCACAF (North America)
- Number of clubs: 6
- Level on pyramid: 1
- Domestic cup: W Canadian Championship
- International cup: CONCACAF W Champions Cup
- Current champions: AFC Toronto (1st title) (2026)
- Current Supporters' Shield: Montreal Roses (1st title) (2026)
- Most championships: AFC Toronto; Vancouver Rise FC (1 title each)
- Most Supporters' Shields: AFC Toronto; Montreal Roses (1 title each)
- Broadcasters: CBC, TSN, Radio-Canada (French); ESPN (United States); RDS (Montreal games)
- Website: www.nsl.ca
- Current: 2026 Northern Super League season

The Northern Super League (NSL; French: Super Ligue du Nord – SLN) is Canada's top-division professional women's soccer league. Owned and operated by Project 8 Sports, the league began play in April 2025 with six founding clubs—Calgary Wild FC, Halifax Tides FC, Montreal Roses FC, Ottawa Rapid FC, AFC Toronto, and Vancouver Rise FC—and will expand to seven teams with the addition of Winnipeg Ember FC in 2027.

== History ==
=== Ideation (2021–2022) ===
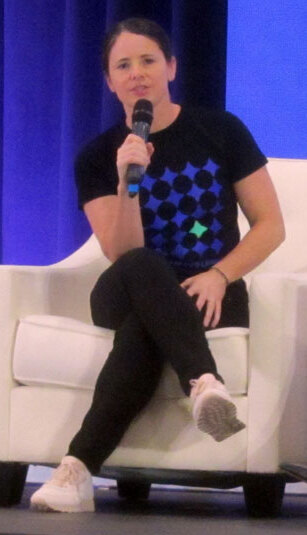
Former Canadian national team player Diana Matheson co-founded Project 8 Sports, Inc., in June 2022 and led it from its launch

Upon her retirement from professional soccer in July 2021, Diana Matheson began advocating for both a national domestic women's league and National Women's Soccer League team in Canada. Her early plans specified a six-month professional league with player leadership, and cited her experience with the Ottawa Fury and Vancouver Whitecaps of the defunct USL W-League as examples of what Canada lacked in player development opportunities. Matheson then entered Queen's University at Kingston to pursue a Master of Business Administration degree in August 2021, and enrolled in the UEFA Executive Master for International Players program toward sports administration. In December 2021, Matheson presented a plan for women's soccer in Canada to the Canadian Soccer Association, but discussions did not progress. While attending Queen's, Matheson co-founded Project 8 Sports Inc. in August 2022 with master's classmate Thomas Gilbert and began planning a professional domestic women's soccer league.

=== Creation (2022–2025) ===
Matheson formally announced the league – known provisionally as Project 8 – on December 5, 2022, alongside former national-team teammate Christine Sinclair, who advised the group. The announcement included the league's first two teams in the Whitecaps and Calgary Foothills WFC, and first two sponsors in CIBC and Air Canada. She also announced talks with Toronto FC owners Maple Leaf Sports & Entertainment (MLSE) and CF Montreal, both of Major League Soccer, and a target of May 2024 for sanctioning from Canada Soccer. Matheson named Dome Productions as the league's initial broadcast production partner.

In January 2023, Matheson noted that talks had also included independent and foreign ownership groups, and announced franchise fees of $1 million with an expectation of owners investing $10 million total over the first five seasons, with entry including equity in the league itself. She also detailed limits on foreign players to seven per team, and suggested that the new league would not deal with Canada Soccer Business, the entity that owns broadcast rights to the Canadian Premier League men's soccer competition.

On April 26, 2023, Project 8 announced the league's third team, AFC Toronto, with an independent ownership group composed of people on the board of North Toronto Soccer Club (NTSC) competing in League1 Ontario, though the Project 8 team would not be formally affiliated with the NTSC organization. The initial announcement did not include participation from Toronto FC or MLSE. In May, Project 8 was recognized as a "league in membership" by the Canadian Soccer Association.

On May 28, 2024, the official logo and name for the league were revealed as the Northern Super League, along with the announcement that teams from both Montreal and Ottawa would also join the league for the 2025 inaugural season. The league avoided including Canada and the word "women" in its name to emulate other successful sports leagues. On May 30, the name and logo of Calgary Wild FC was unveiled. On June 13, the name and logo of Halifax Tides FC was announced. On August 15, the name and logo of Ottawa Rapid FC was unveiled. On August 26, the name and logo of Vancouver Rise FC was unveiled. On October 8, the name and logo of Montreal Roses FC was unveiled.

On July 8, 2024, former CFL and Woodbine Entertainment Group executive Christina Litz was announced as the league's president with Matheson moving into the role of chief growth officer.

=== 2025 season ===
The inaugural match was held on April 16, 2025, with Vancouver hosting Calgary at BC Place. The first goal in league history was a penalty kick scored by Quinn.

The league's preparations and launch were profiled in Michèle Hozer's 2025 documentary film The Pitch.

On September 8, 2025, the league announced that it was seeking to add an expansion team in 2027, engaging Whitecap Sports Group to identify and evaluate a new ownership group for club opportunities, focusing on Central and Western Canada.

=== 2026 season ===
The opening match was held at Swangard Stadium on April 24, 2026, between the defending league champions Vancouver Rise FC and defending regular season winners AFC Toronto. The final will be held on November 14, 2026.

On July 14, it was announced that an expansion team based in Winnipeg, later named Winnipeg Ember FC, would begin play in the 2027 season, with Desiree Scott and Rob Gale as its founders.

== Competition format ==
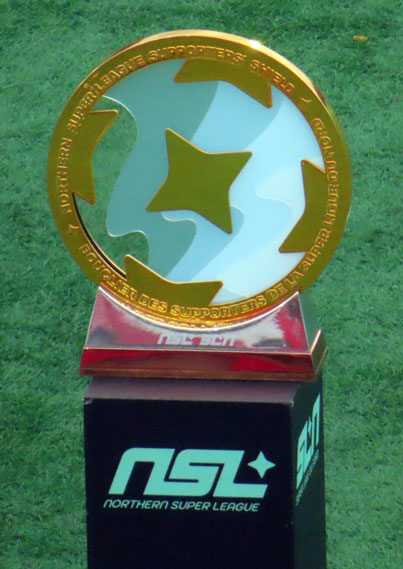
NSL Supporters' Shield trophy awarded to the regular season champions

For the inaugural season in 2025 and the following season in 2026, the six founding clubs each played 25 matches—three had 13 home and 12 away matches, while the remaining three had 12 home matches and 13 away matches. The league uses the standard points system in world soccer—three points for a win, one for a draw, and none for a loss. A single table is used to determine the four teams who advance to the postseason playoffs, beginning with a semifinal staged in a home-and-away aggregate series; the higher seed hosts the second leg. The single-leg league championship is held at a pre-determined host city.

The format for the expanded 2027 season has not yet been announced.

The Supporters' Shield is awarded to the regular season champions. The Diana B. Matheson Cup is awarded to the winner of the NSL's playoff final. Since 2026, NSL clubs also compete in the W Canadian Championship where the winner qualifies for the CONCACAF W Champions Cup.

The Northern Super League clubs primarily use shared stadiums and have lower scheduling priority compared to the primary or established tenants. Matchdays were determined by available dates at these venues as well as breaks for international play mandated by the FIFA International Match Calendar.

== Teams ==
On April 4, 2024, the league confirmed that six clubs had submitted applications to the CSA to get professional status.

On July 14, 2026, the league announced an expansion team, later named Winnipeg Ember FC, in Winnipeg, beginning in the 2027 season. This is the first expansion team in the league and brings the total number of teams to seven.

Current clubs
Team	City	Stadium	Capacity	First season	Head coach	Ownership	Ref.
Calgary Wild FC	Calgary, Alberta	McMahon Stadium	35,400	2025	(England) Lydia Bedford	Calgary Foothills FC	
Halifax Tides FC	Halifax, Nova Scotia	Wanderers Grounds	6,500	2025	(Trinidad and Tobago) Stephen Hart (interim)	Courtney Sherlock (CEO)	
Montreal Roses FC	Laval, Quebec	Stade Boréale	5,581	2025	(Romania) Robert Rositoiu	Isabele Chevalier; Jean-François Crevier	
Ottawa Rapid FC	Ottawa, Ontario	TD Place Stadium	6,419	2025	(Denmark) Katrine Pedersen	Diana Matheson; Tom Gilbert	
AFC Toronto	Toronto, Ontario	York Lions Stadium	4,000	2025	(Canada) Marko Milanović	Mark Mitchell (majority); Helena Ruken (CEO); Brenda Ha (COO); Jill Burgin (CMO); Mike Ruthard; Billy Wilson; Shamez Mangalji	
Vancouver Rise FC	Burnaby, British Columbia	Swangard Stadium	4,500	2025	(Denmark) Anja Heiner-Møller	Greg Kerfoot (majority); Christine Sinclair	

Future clubs
Team	City	Stadium	Capacity	First season	Head coach	Ownership	Ref.
Winnipeg Ember FC	Winnipeg, Manitoba	Ralph Cantafio Soccer Complex	2,000 (planned 4,500)	2027	TBA	TBA	

=== Location map ===
Locations of current and future NSL teams

== League titles ==
=== NSL results by team ===
Team	Diana B. Matheson Cup		NSL Supporters' Shield		Total titles
Team	Titles	Years	Titles	Years	Total titles
AFC Toronto	1	2026	1	2025	2
Vancouver Rise FC	1	2025	0		1
Montreal Roses FC	0		1	2026	1

=== NSL results by year ===
Year	Teams	Diana B. Matheson Cup	NSL Supporters' Shield	Playoff runner-up	Regular season runner-up
2025	6	Vancouver Rise FC	AFC Toronto	AFC Toronto	Ottawa Rapid FC
2026	6	AFC Toronto	Montreal Roses FC	Montreal Roses FC	Ottawa Rapid FC

== Broadcasting ==
On June 11, 2024, the NSL announced multi-year deals with CBC, Radio-Canada, TSN and RDS. On April 7, 2025, the NSL announced multi-year media partnership with ESPN to air matches in the United States, where ESPN+ streams at least 40 matches annually, including select playoff games and the final.

== See also ==
- Prominent women's sports leagues in the United States and Canada
- List of professional sports teams in the United States and Canada
- Women's soccer in Canada
- Women's professional sports
