= 2026 Montreal Roses FC season =

Canadian soccer club's season of play

Montreal Roses FC
2026 season
- Owner: Isabèle Chevalier; Jean-François Crevier
- President: Annie Larouche
- Head coach: Maryse Bard-Martel (interim)
- Stadium: Stade Boréale; Laval, Quebec
- W Canadian Championship: Quarter-finals

The 2026 Montreal Roses FC season was the second in the club's history, as well as the second season in Northern Super League history.

== Summary ==
During the 2025 season, Montreal Roses finished fourth in the league, and got to the playoff semi–finals.

On 15 February 2026, Montreal Roses announced their training camp roster, along with the signing of Mariloup Wolfe, who became the youngest player in club history.

On 2 March 2026, Montreal Roses announced the technical staff ahead of the 2026 season.

After Kang Chae-rim terminated her contract with the club, she subsequently joined Gangjin Swans.

The Montreal Roses competed in the inaugural W Canadian Championship this season, but would find their campaign cut short following an 0-1 loss to Simcoe County Rovers FC in the quarter-finals. Following this loss, the team would fire their head coach, Robert Rositoiu, with Maryse Bard-Martel subsequently serving as interim head coach.

On 19 August 2026, Montreal Roses appointed Hugues Léger as club president.

On 29 August 2026, Montreal Roses played against Halifax Tides, setting a new Northern Super League attendance record with 17,077 fans.

== Team ==
=== Technical Team ===
As of October 19, 2025.

Position	Name
Sporting director	Marinette Pichon
Assistant to the Sporting director	Adrien Moufflet
Head coach	Maryse Bard-Martel
Assistant coach	Antoine Guldner; Francisco Vela
Goalkeeping coach	Maryse Bard-Martel
Performance coach	Yannick Girard
Mental coach	Antoine Guldner
Head of performance culture	Antoine Guldner
Team Manager	Mathilde Lefebvre Lalande
Equipment Manager	Maude Desnoyers
Head Physiotherapist	Christine Thériault-Loranger
Assistant Physiotherapist	Maude Gohier
Consultant	Nick De Santis

=== Players ===
As of 10 September 2026.

No.	Nat.	Name	Date of birth (age)	Since	Signed from	Notes
Goalkeepers
1	(Canada)	Anna Karpenko	10 April 2002 (age 24)	2025	(Canada) Vaughan Azzurri	
22	(Canada)	Anne-Marie Laroche	6 March 2000 (age 26)	2025	(Canada) Royal-Sélect de Beauport	
26	(Canada)	Gabrielle Lambert	27 December 1993 (age 32)	2024	(Germany) SC Freiburg	
Defenders
2	(United States)	Lucy Cappadona	13 April 2002 (age 24)	2025	(United States) UConn Huskies	INT
3	(United States)	Hailey Whitaker	24 February 2000 (age 26)	2025	(Iceland) Valur	INT
4	(Canada)	Stephanie Hill	26 December 2001 (age 24)	2025	(Canada) McGill University	
5	(United States)	Julia Leas	3 March 2001 (age 25)	2025	(Sweden) Vittsjö GIK	INT
20	(Canada)	Mégane Sauvé	6 April 1998 (age 28)	2025	(Portugal) Sporting CP	
24	(Canada)	Olivia Mbala	12 May 1992 (age 34)	2025	(France) Lille	
Midfielders
8	(Canada)	Mara Bouchard	20 April 2001 (age 25)	2025	(Canada) McGill University	
10	(Canada)	Lisa Pechersky	29 June 1998 (age 28)	2026	(Canada) Vancouver Rise FC	
13	(Ghana)	Evelyn Badu	11 September 2002 (age 24)	2026	(Norway) Molde FK	INT
15	(Canada)	Chloe Minas	12 April 2002 (age 24)	2025	(Sweden) Växjö	
18	(France)	Charlotte Bilbault	5 June 1990 (age 36)	2024	(France) Montpellier	INT
19	(Canada)	Lorie Thibault	19 March 2000 (age 26)	2025	(Canada) Montreal Carabins	
23	(Canada)	Félicia Roy	7 April 2006 (age 20)	2025	(Canada) Collège Champlain Cavaliers	
Forwards
7	(Canada)	Noémi Paquin	9 June 2001 (age 25)	2025	(United States) FIU Panthers	
9	(United States)	Elyse Bennett	27 December 1999 (age 26)	2026	(United States) Orlando Pride	INT
12	(Ukraine)	Tanya Boychuk	20 June 2000 (age 26)	2024	(Sweden) Vittsjö GIK	
14	(Canada)	Claire Monyard	15 May 2000 (age 26)	2025	(United States) Miami Athletic Club	
21	(Canada)	Marilou Harvey	17 June 2009 (age 17)	2026	(Canada) CS St-Hubert	
Players who made an appearance and/or had a squad number but left the team.
11	(South Korea)	Kang Chae-rim	23 May 1998 (age 28)	2025	(South Korea) Suwon	INT
17	(South Korea)	Choi Han-bin	2 March 2004 (age 22)	2026	(South Korea) Korea University	INT

== Competitions ==
=== Northern Super League ===
==== Table ====
Pos	Team	Pld	W	D	L	GF	GA	GD	Pts	Playoff qualification
1	Montreal Roses (S)	25	12	9	4	43	27	+16	45	Advance to play-offs
2	Ottawa Rapid	25	12	4	9	49	44	+5	40	Advance to play-offs
3	AFC Toronto	25	10	9	6	38	24	+14	39	Advance to play-offs
4	Vancouver Rise	25	9	4	12	47	55	−8	31	Advance to play-offs
5	Halifax Tides	25	7	8	10	24	24	0	29	
6	Calgary Wild	25	5	6	14	28	55	−27	21	

Source: NSL
Rules for classification: 1) Points 2) Head-to-head points; 3) Head-to-head goal difference; 4) Goal difference; 5) Wins; 6) Goals scored; 7) Goals conceded; 8) Least red cards; 9) Least yellow cards; 10) Drawing of lots.
(S) Supporters' Shield winner

==== Matches ====
===== April and May =====
April 25, 2026 1	Calgary Wild	0–2	Montreal Roses	Calgary, Alberta
17:00 EDT (UTC-06:00)	Boeckx (yellow card) 85'	Report	Bennett 37', 49'; Hill (yellow card) 79'	Stadium: McMahon Stadium; Attendance: 3,219; Referee: Anne-Marie Canuel

May 2, 2026 2	Montreal Roses	4–0	Vancouver Rise FC	Laval, Quebec
19:00 EDT (UTC-04:00)	Bennett 12'; Boychuk 44', 48'; Paquin 85'	Report	Reyes (yellow card) 29'	Stadium: Stade Boréale; Attendance: 3,304; Referee: Myriam Marcotte

May 10, 2026 3	AFC Toronto	0–1	Montreal Roses	Toronto, Ontario
13:00 EDT (UTC-4:00)		Report	Bennett 88'	Stadium: BMO Field; Attendance: 3,153; Referee: Scott Bowman

May 16, 2026 4	Calgary Wild FC	2–2	Montreal Roses	Calgary, Alberta
15:00 MDT (UTC-06:00)	Jones 85', 90+1'	Report	Pechersky 24' (yellow card) 83'; Monyard 90'	Stadium: McMahon Stadium; Attendance: 2,342; Referee: Fabrizio Stasolla

May 23, 2026 5	Ottawa Rapid FC	1–2	Montreal Roses	Ottawa, Ontario
13:00 EDT (UTC-04:00)	Choo 62'	Report	Boychuk 15', 45'; Hill (yellow card) 45+2'2	Stadium: TD Place Stadium; Attendance: 1,877; Referee: Sheila Couture

May 30, 2026 6	Montreal Roses	2–3	Vancouver Rise FC	Laval, Quebec
14:00 EDT (UTC-04:00)	Bennett 8'; Cappadona (yellow card) 35'; Paquin 81'	Report	Bout 16' (yellow card) 45+1'; Longhurst 71'; De Filippo 86'; Tumeth (yellow card) 90+1'	Stadium: Stade Boréale; Attendance: 2,457; Referee: Myriam Marcotte

===== June =====
June 13, 2026 7	AFC Toronto	1–1	Montreal Roses	Toronto, Ontario
16:00 EDT (UTC-04:00)	Brewster (yellow card) 56'; Rowe 68'; Hunter (yellow card) 85'; Fontana (yellow card) 89'	Report	Cappadona (yellow card) 83'; Pechersky 90+4'	Stadium: York Lions Stadium; Attendance: 2,554; Referee: Myriam Marcotte

June 21, 2026 8	Montreal Roses FC	1–1	Calgary Wild	Laval, Quebec
14:00 EDT (UTC-04:00)	Badu 29'	Report	Johnson 10'	Stadium: Stade Boréale; Attendance: 2,068; Referee: Sheila Couture

June 25, 2026 9	Montreal Roses	1–2	Ottawa Rapid FC	Laval, Quebec
19:00 EDT (UTC-04:00)	Minas (yellow card) 28'; Badu (yellow card) 39'; Bennett 89'	Report	Melenhorst 12'; Forbes 69'	Stadium: Stade Boréale; Attendance: 1,792; Referee: Carly Shaw-Maclaren

===== July =====
July 4, 2026 10	Montreal Roses	5–1	Vancouver Rise FC	Laval, Quebec
15:30 EDT (UTC-04:00)	Badu 18', 67', 83'; Bilbault (yellow card) 20'; Bennett 53'; Boychuk 70'	Report	De Filippo 20'	Stadium: Stade Boréale; Attendance: 1,891; Referee: Anne-Marie Canuel

July 12, 2026 11	Montreal Roses	1–0	Halifax Tides FC	Laval, Quebec
16:00 EDT (UTC-04:00)	Badu (yellow card) 26'; Minas 77'	Report	Benati (yellow card) 34'; Cameron (yellow card) 83'	Stadium: Stade Boréale; Attendance: 2,565; Referee: Isabelle Duclos

July 17, 2026 12	Calgary Wild FC	0–2	Montreal Roses	Calgary, Alberta
19:00 MDT (UTC-6:00)		Report	Cappadona 29'; Whitaker 33'	Stadium: McMahon Stadium; Attendance: 2,292; Referee: Carly Shaw-MacLaren

July 23, 2026 13	Montreal Roses	0–2	AFC Toronto	Laval, Quebec
19:00 EDT (UTC-04:00)	Minas (yellow card) 32' (yellow-red card) 73'	Report	Rollins (yellow card) 19'; Uddenberg (yellow card) 29'; Rowe 49'; Small (yellow card) 52'; Zadorsky (yellow card) 70'; Hunter 74'	Stadium: Stade Boréale; Attendance: 2,348; Referee: Sheila Couture

July 29, 2026 14	Vancouver Rise FC	3–4	Montreal Roses	Burnaby, British Columbia
19:00 PT (UTC-07:00)	López 3'; Oularbi 17'; Tumeth (yellow card) 45+3'; Abdu 89'	Report	Pechersky 14'; Bennett 39'; Bilbault (yellow card) 46'; Alidou 54'; Seto 58'	Stadium: Swangard Stadium; Attendance: 3,655; Referee: Renzo Villanueva

===== August =====
August 7, 2026 15	Montreal Roses	0–1	Halifax Tides FC	Laval, Quebec
19:00 EDT (UTC-04:00)	Lucy Cappadona (yellow card) 53'	Report	Bentani 45'; Leslie (yellow card) 49'; McDermot (yellow card) 74'; Benati (yellow card) 89'	Stadium: Stade Boréale; Attendance: 2,374; Referee: Roberto D'Alesio

August 16, 2026 16	AFC Toronto	1–2	Montreal Roses	Toronto, Ontario
15:00 EDT (UTC-04:00)	Zadorsky 68'	Report	Alidou 55'; Bennett 74'	Stadium: BMO Field; Attendance: 4,793; Referee: Anne-Marie Canuel

August 23, 2026 17	Montreal Roses	2–2	Calgary Wild FC	Laval, Quebec
15:00 EDT (UTC-04:00)	Pierre-Louis (yellow card) 45+3'; Alidou 45+3', (yellow card) 78'; Bennett 50'; Minas (yellow card) 82'	Report	Stewart 36' (pen.); Baucom 70'; Robertson (yellow card) 84'	Stadium: Stade Boréale; Referee: Myriam Marcotte

August 29, 2026 18	Montreal Roses	1–0	Halifax Tides FC	Montreal, Quebec
14:00 EDT (UTC-04:00)	Sauvé (yellow card) 66'; Seto 76'	Report	Vallerand (yellow card) 54'; Allen (yellow card) 68' (yellow-red card) 68'	Stadium: Stade Saputo; Attendance: 17,077; Referee: Alain Ruch

===== September =====
September 6, 2026 19	Ottawa Rapid FC	2–3	Montreal Roses	Ottawa, Ontario
	Fridlund 30'; Melenhorst 61'; Harris (yellow card) 90+4'	Report	Bennett 4'; Pechersky 17'; Whitaker (yellow card) 48'; Paquin 87'	Stadium: TD Place Stadium; Referee: Sheila Couture

September 10, 2026 20	Montreal Roses	2–2	AFC Toronto	Laval, Quebec
	Whitaker 18'; Bilbault (yellow card) 38'; Pierre-Louis 79'	Report	Rollins (yellow card) 24'; Rowe 82'; Small (yellow card) 83' (goal) 88'	Stadium: Stade Boréale; Referee: Sebastian Noshinravani

September 19, 2026 21	Vancouver Rise FC	2–2	Montreal Roses	Burnaby, British Columbia
	Bout (yellow card) 43'; Okamoto (yellow card) 45+1'; Reyes (yellow card) 80'; De Filippo 83'; Tumeth 90+2'	Report	Alidou (yellow card) 41'; Pechersky 67'; Badu 90+3'	Stadium: Swangard Stadium; Referee: Carly Shaw-MacLaren

September 27, 2026 22	Halifax Tides	0–0	Montreal Roses FC	Halifax, Nova Scotia
	Weichers (yellow card) 72'	Report	Badu (yellow card) 90+3'	Stadium: Wanderers Grounds; Attendance: 3,721; Referee: Renzo Villanueva

===== October =====
October 2, 2026 23	Montreal Roses	0–0	Ottawa Rapid FC	Laval, Quebec
		Report	Scott (yellow card) 78'; Wilkinson (yellow card) 86'	Stadium: Stade Boréale; Referee: Yusri Rudolf

October 17, 2026 24	Halifax Tides FC	2–2	Montreal Roses	Halifax, Nova Scotia
	Vallerand (yellow card) 25'; Rhodes 70'; Allen (yellow card) 73'; Cameron 86'	Report	Cappadonna 27'; Alidou 45+1'	Stadium: Wanderers Grounds; Referee: Mario Alayass

October 23, 2026 25	Montreal Roses	1–0	Ottawa Rapid FC	Laval, Quebec
	Boychuk 80'; Thibault (yellow card) 90+4'	Report		Stadium: Stade Boréale; Referee: Renzo Villanueva

===== Playoffs =====
November 1, 2026 Semi-finals Leg 1	Vancouver Rise FC	0–3	Montreal Roses FC	Burnaby, British Columbia
7:00 pm EST	Tumeth (yellow card) 45+1'; Abdu (yellow card) 58'; De Filippo (yellow card) 77'	Report	Bennett 11'; Alidou 30'; Pechersky 72'	Stadium: Swangard Stadium; Referee: Isabelle Duclos

November 8, 2026 Semi-finals Leg 2	Montreal Roses FC	2–2	Vancouver Rise FC	Laval, Quebec
7:00 pm EST	Paquin 39'; Alidou (yellow card) 54'; Badu (yellow card) 58'; Pechersky 77'	Report	Bout (yellow card) 19'; De Filippo 41'; Abdu 45+2'	Stadium: Stade Boréal; Referee: Myriam Marcotte

November 14, 2026 Final	Montreal Roses FC	0–1	AFC Toronto	Ottawa
2:00pm		Report	Chisholm 39'	Stadium: TD Place Stadium; Referee: Carly Shaw-Maclaren

=== W Canadian Championship ===
August 12, 2026 Quarter-finals	Montreal Roses	0–1	Simcoe County Rovers FC	Laval, Quebec
6:00 pm EDT		Report	Schaffer 2'; Young (yellow card) 64'; Bisante (yellow card) 90+6'	Stadium: Stade Boréale; Attendance: 608; Referee: Salma Flores-Desrochers

== Transactions ==
=== Contract operations ===
Date	Player	Pos.	Notes	Ref.
18 November 2025	(United States) Julia Leas	DF	Contract option exercised	
18 November 2025	(France) Charlotte Bilbault	DF	Contract option exercised	
18 November 2025	(Canada) Anne-Marie Laroche	GK	Contract option exercised	
18 November 2025	(United States) Hailey Whitaker	DF	New contract	
18 November 2025	(Germany) Lara Schenk	DF	Contract not renewed for the 2026 season	
18 November 2025	(Canada) Mathilde Lachance	DF	Contract not renewed for the 2026 season	
9 December 2025	(United States) Jodi Smith	DF	Mutual contract termination	
12 February 2026	(United States) Allie Hess	MF	Mutual contract termination so Hess could join Calgary Wild FC	
23 June 2026	(South Korea) Kang Chae-rim	MF	Mutual contract termination	
30 June 2026	(South Korea) Choi Han-bin	MF	Mutual contract termination	

=== Transfers in ===
No.	Pos.	Player	From club	Fee/notes	Date	Source
N/A	MF	(Canada) Lisa Pechersky	(Canada) Vancouver Rise FC	Transfer	13 January 2026	
N/A	MF	(South Korea) Choi Han-bin	(South Korea) Korea University	Transfer	21 January 2026	
N/A	MF	(Ghana) Evelyn Badu	(Norway) Molde	Transfer	28 January 2026	
N/A	FW	(United States) Elyse Bennett		Free agent	3 February 2026	
N/A	FW	(Canada) Marilou Harvey	(Canada) CS St-Hubert	Transfer	15 February 2026	
N/A	MF	(Canada) Anne-Valérie Seto		Free agent	14 April 2026	
	MF	(Canada) Marie-Yasmine Alidou	(United States) Portland Thorns	Transfer	8 July 2026	
	DF	(France) Ève Périsset	(Mexico) Tigres UANL	Transfer	8 July 2026	
	GK	(Canada) Florence Cloutier	(Canada) AS Brossard	Transfer	11 August 2026	
	DF	(United States) Anna Heilferty	(United States) Tampa Bay Sun FC	Free agent	8 September 2026	

=== Transfers out ===
No.	Pos.	Player	To club	Fee/notes	Date	Source

== Statistics ==
As of August 30, 2026

No.	Pos	Nat	Player	Total		Northern Super League		W Canadian Championship	
No.	Pos	Nat	Player	Apps	Goals	Apps	Goals	Apps	Goals
1	GK	(Canada) CAN	Anna Karpenko	19	0	18	0	1	0
2	DF	(United States) USA	Lucy Cappadona	18	1	18	1	0	0
3	DF	(United States) USA	Hailey Whitaker	18	1	17	1	1	0
4	DF	(Canada) CAN	Stéphanie Hill	7	0	7	0	0	0
5	DF	(United States) USA	Julia Leas	0	0	0	0	0	0
6	DF	(Canada) CAN	Anne-Valérie Seto	19	2	18	2	1	0
7	FW	(Canada) CAN	Noémi Paquin	15	2	15	2	0	0
8	MF	(Canada) CAN	Mara Bouchard	3	0	3	0	0	0
9	FW	(United States) USA	Elyse Bennett	19	10	18	10	1	0
10	MF	(Canada) CAN	Lisa Pechersky	15	3	14	3	1	0
11	MF	(Canada) CAN	Marie-Yasmine Alidou	7	3	6	3	1	0
11	MF	(South Korea) KOR	Kang Chae-rim	8	0	8	0	0	0
12	FW	(Ukraine) UKR	Tanya Boychuk	18	4	17	4	1	0
13	MF	(Ghana) GHA	Evelyn Badu	10	4	10	4	0	0
14	MF	(Canada) CAN	Claire Monyard	12	1	11	1	1	0
15	MF	(Canada) CAN	Chloe Minas	18	1	17	1	1	0
17	DF	(Canada) CAN	Mélyna Alexis	1	0	1	0	0	0
18	MF	(France) FRA	Charlotte Bilbault	19	0	18	0	1	0
19	DF	(Canada) CAN	Lorie Thibault	19	0	18	0	1	0
20	MF	(Canada) CAN	Mégane Sauvé	19	0	18	0	1	0
21	FW	(Canada) CAN	Marilou Harvey	5	0	5	0	0	0
22	GK	(Canada) CAN	Anne-Marie Laroche	0	0	0	0	0	0
23	MF	(Canada) CAN	Félicia Roy	4	0	4	0	0	0
24	DF	(Canada) CAN	Olivia Mbala	13	0	13	0	0	0
26	GK	(Canada) CAN	Gabrielle Lambert	0	0	0	0	0	0
28	DF	(Canada) CAN	Amandine Pierre-Louis	4	0	3	0	1	0

- Source: Northern Super League
