= 2025 Montreal Roses FC season =

Canadian soccer club's season of play

Montreal Roses FC
2025 season
- Owner: Isabèle Chevalier; Jean-François Crevier
- President: Annie Larouche
- Head coach: Robert Rositoiu
- Stadium: Stade Boréale; Laval, Quebec
- Northern Super League: 4th
- Top goalscorer: Latifah Abdu (8)
- Highest home attendance: 5,049 (vs Ottawa Rapid, 3 May 2025)
- Lowest home attendance: 2,100 (vs Ottawa Rapid, 16 August 2025)
- Average home league attendance: 3,205

The 2025 Montreal Roses FC season is the first in the club's history, as well as first season in Northern Super League history. The first match was a 1–0 win against AFC Toronto on April 19, 2025.

== Team ==
=== Administration ===
As of October 19, 2025.

Position	Name
President	Annie Larouche
Vice-President, Strategies and Communications	Nathalie Vachon
Marketing and Communications Manager	Cynthia Cianciusi
Content and Digital Platforms Manager	Patrick Lacson
Director, Events and Community	Sidney Ginchereau
Director, Culture and Finance	Andréanne Gagné
Director, Operations	Mélissa Beauchesne
Director, Partnerships	Baptiste Robert
Box Office Director	Antoine Chevalier
Specialist, Member Experience	Amanda Silva Marques
Specialist, Member Experience	Vanessa Beaupré
Coordinator, Boutique	Angelo Destounis
Ambassador	Amy Walsh

=== Technical Team ===
As of October 19, 2025.

Position	Name
Sporting director	Marinette Pichon
Assistant to the Sporting director	Adrien Moufflet
Head coach	Robert Rositoiu
Assistant coach	Maryse Bard-Martel; Yannick Girard; Antoine Guldner
Goalkeeping coach	Maryse Bard-Martel
Performance coach	Yannick Girard
Mental coach	Antoine Guldner
Head of performance culture	Antoine Guldner
Team Manager	Laurence Hamel
Equipment Manager	Mathilde Lefebvre Lalande
Head Physiotherapist	Christine Thériault-Loranger
Consultant	Nick De Santis

=== First team squad ===
As of October 19, 2025

No.	Nat.	Name	Date of birth (age)	Since	Last Contract	Signed from	Notes
Goalkeepers
1	(Canada)	Anna Karpenko	10 April 2002 (age 24)	2025	February 2025	(Canada) Vaughan Azzurri	
26	(Canada)	Gabrielle Lambert	27 December 1993 (age 32)	2024	October 2024	(Germany) SC Freiburg	
	(Canada)	Anne-Marie Laroche	6 March 2000 (age 26)	2025	January 2025	(Canada) Royal-Sélect de Beauport	
Defenders
2	(United States)	Lucy Cappadona	13 April 2002 (age 24)	2025	February 2025	(United States) UConn Huskies	INT
3	(United States)	Hailey Whitaker	24 February 2000 (age 26)	2025	February 2025	(Iceland) Valur	INT
4	(Canada)	Stephanie Hill	26 December 2001 (age 24)	2025	January 2025	(Canada) McGill University	
5	(United States)	Julia Leas	3 March 2001 (age 25)	2025	February 2025	(Sweden) Vittsjö GIK	INT
16	(Germany)	Lara Schenk	20 January 2000 (age 26)	2025	April 2025	(Spain) Sporting de Huelva	INT
17	(United States)	Jodi Smith	17 January 2003 (age 23)	2025	January 2025	(United States) Tormenta FC	INT
21	(Canada)	Mathilde Lachance	2 July 2002 (age 23)	2025	February 2025	(Canada) Université Laval	
24	(Canada)	Olivia Mbala	12 May 1992 (age 34)	2025	July 2025	(France) Lille	
Midfielders
6	(United States)	Alexandria Hess	19 July 1996 (age 29)	2025	January 2025	(Germany) MSV Duisburg	INT
8	(Canada)	Mara Bouchard	20 April 2001 (age 25)	2025	January 2025	(Canada) McGill University	
15	(Canada)	Chloe Minas	12 April 2002 (age 24)	2025	August 2025	(Sweden) Växjö	
18	(France)	Charlotte Bilbault	5 June 1990 (age 36)	2024	October 2024	(France) Montpellier	INT
19	(Canada)	Lorie Thibault	19 March 2000 (age 26)	2025	January 2025	(Canada) Montreal Carabins	
23	(Canada)	Félicia Roy	7 April 2006 (age 20)	2025	January 2025	(Canada) Collège Champlain Cavaliers	
Forwards
7	(Canada)	Noémi Paquin	9 June 2001 (age 24)	2025	January 2025	(United States) FIU Panthers	
11	(South Korea)	Kang Chae-rim	23 May 1998 (age 28)	2025	August 2025	(United States) Suwon	INT
12	(Ukraine)	Tanya Boychuk	20 June 2000 (age 25)	2024	December 2024	(Sweden) Vittsjö GIK	
14	(Canada)	Claire Monyard	15 May 2000 (age 26)	2025	January 2025	(United States) Miami Athletic Club	
20	(Canada)	Mégane Sauvé	6 April 1998 (age 28)	2025	January 2025	(Portugal) Sporting C.P.	
Players who made an appearance and/or had a squad number but left the team.
99	(Canada)	Latifah Abdu	18 October 2001 (age 24)	2024	December 2024	(France) Guingamp	

== Competitions ==
=== Northern Super League ===
==== Table ====
Pos	Team	Pld	W	D	L	GF	GA	GD	Pts	Qualification
1	AFC Toronto (S)	25	16	3	6	42	24	+18	51	Advance to playoffs
2	Ottawa Rapid	25	11	6	8	41	26	+15	39 (Note: Head-to-head points tied 7–7; head-to-head goal difference: Ottawa Rapid +3, Vancouver Rise –3)	Advance to playoffs
3	Vancouver Rise (C)	25	11	6	8	38	36	+2	39	Advance to playoffs
4	Montreal Roses	25	10	6	9	30	23	+7	36	Advance to playoffs
5	Calgary Wild	25	9	2	14	26	42	−16	29	
6	Halifax Tides	25	3	7	15	17	43	−26	16	

Source: NSL
Rules for classification: 1) Head-to-head points; 2) Head-to-head goal difference; 3) Overall goal difference; 4) Most wins; 5) Most goals scored; 6) Least goals conceded; 7) Least red cards; 8) Least yellow cards; 9) Drawing of lots.
(C) Champion; (S) Supporters' Shield winner

==== Results by match ====
Match	1	2	3	4	5	6	7	8	9	10	11	12	13	14	15	16	17	18	19	20	21	22	23	24	25
Ground	A	A	H	H	A	H	A	H	A	A	H	A	H	A	H	H	H	A	A	A	H	H	A	H	A
Result	W	W	W	D	L	L	D	W	W	D	L	W	W	D	L	L	W	L	D	W	W	L	D	L	L
Position (Note: Positions show the situation at the end of the week the match was played, not the position at the conclusion of matches or game days.)	1	1	1	1	1	1	1	1	1	2	2	2	2	2	2	2	2	3	2	4	4	2	3	3	4
Points	3	6	9	10	10	10	11	14	17	18	18	21	24	25	25	25	28	28	29	32	35	35	36	36	36

Source: #Matches
H = Home; N = Neutral; A = Away; W = Win; D = Draw; L = Loss; = Playoffs

==== Matches ====
April 19 1	AFC Toronto	0–1	Montreal Roses	Toronto, Ontario
16:00 ET		Report	Boychuk 2'; Bilbault (yellow card) 66'	Stadium: BMO Field; Referee: Carly Marissa Shaw-MacLaren; Assistant referees: Gabrielle Lemieux, Melissa Snedden

April 27 2	Vancouver Rise	1–3	Montreal Roses	Burnaby, British Columbia
15:00 ET	Spencer (yellow card) 16'; Quinn 55' (pen.)	Report	Whitaker 3'; Hess 14'; Bilbault (yellow card) 23'; Abdu 41'	Stadium: Swangard Stadium; Referee: Isabelle Duclos; Assistant referees: Camille Raymond, Megan Opatril

May 3 3	Montreal Roses	2–1	Ottawa Rapid	Laval, Quebec
19:00 ET	Abdu 51', (yellow card) 56'; Boychuk 69'; Monyard (yellow card) 90+4'	Report	Min-a (yellow card) 37'; Pridham 39'	Stadium: Stade Boréale; Attendance: 5,049; Referee: Marie-Soleil Beaudoin; Assistant referees: Stéphanie Fortin, Allycia Carlucci

May 10 4	Montreal Roses	0–0	Halifax Tides	Laval, Quebec
13:00 ET		Report	Lemire (yellow card) 68'; Frémaux (yellow card) 87'	Stadium: Stade Boréale; Referee: Anne-Marie Canuel; Assistant referees: Marie-Han Gagnon, Gabrielle Lemieux

May 18 5	Calgary Wild	1–0	Montreal Roses	Calgary, Alberta
17:00 ET	Robertson 85'; Dougherty Howard (yellow card) 90+2'; Moore (yellow card) 90+5'	Report	Schenk (yellow card) 11'; Leas (yellow card) 16'; Smith (yellow card) 83'; Whitaker (yellow card) 90+2'	Stadium: McMahon Stadium; Attendance: 3,502; Referee: Marie-Soleil Beaudoin; Assistant referees: Megan Opatril, Heather Lloyd

May 22 6	Montreal Roses	0–2	AFC Toronto	Laval, Quebec
19:00 ET	Leas (yellow card) 61'	Report	Okoronkwo 34'; Small (yellow card) 65'; Regan 72'	Stadium: Stade Boréale; Attendance: 2,606; Referee: Sheila Couture; Assistant referees: Camille Raymond, Amanda Kwan

May 25 7	Ottawa Rapid	1–1	Montreal Roses	Ottawa, Ontario
14:00 ET	Min-a (yellow card) 24'; Delaney Baie Pridham 90+2'	Report	Hill 53'; Schenk (yellow card) 85'	Stadium: TD Place Stadium; Attendance: 2,591; Referee: Isabelle Duclos; Assistant referees: Allycia Carlucci, Laura Hall

June 7 8	Montreal Roses	2–0	Vancouver Rise	Laval, Quebec
14:00 ET	Hill 9'; Bilbault 24'	Report	Quinn (yellow card) 14'	Stadium: Stade Boréale; Attendance: 3,855; Referee: Isabelle Duclos; Assistant referees: Gabrielle Lemieux, Megan Opatril

June 14 9	Ottawa Rapid	1–2	Montreal Roses	Ottawa, Ontario
15:00 ET	O. Scott (red card) 26'; Pridham 57', (yellow card) 75'	Report	Abdu 23'; Boychuk 65'; Monyard (yellow card) 83'	Stadium: TD Place Stadium; Attendance: 3,576; Referee: Anne-Marie Canuel; Assistant referees: Marie-Han Gagnon, Natalie Berry

June 22 10	Vancouver Rise	0–0	Montreal Roses	Burnaby, British Columbia
16:00 ET		Report	Hill (yellow card) 30'; Hess (yellow card) 69'; Smith (yellow card) 74'	Stadium: Swangard Stadium; Attendance: 3,858; Referee: Marie-Soleil Beaudoin; Assistant referees: Allycia Carlucci; Victoria Lafortune

July 12 11	Montreal Roses	0–1	Halifax Tides	Laval, Quebec
17:00 ET	Smith (yellow card) 46'; Sauvé (yellow card) 53'	Report	Kennedy (yellow card) 65'; Blouin 87'	Stadium: Stade Boréale; Attendance: 2,900; Referee: Isabelle Duclos; Assistant referees: Stéphanie Fortin, Megan Opatril

July 18 12	AFC Toronto	1–2	Montreal Roses	Toronto, Ontario
19:30 ET	Pickett 77'	Report	Abdu 30'; Schenk (yellow card) 37'; Sauvé (yellow card) 62' (goal) 68'	Stadium: York Lions Stadium; Attendance: 2,873; Referee: Marie-Soleil Beaudoin; Assistant referees: Gabrielle Lemieux, Amanda Kwan

July 26 13	Montreal Roses	2–0	Calgary Wild	Laval, Quebec
19:00 ET	Abdu 0'; Boychuk 5' (yellow card) 45+1'	Report	Robertson (yellow card) 45+2'; Green (yellow card) 57'; Stordy (yellow card) 79'; Gray (yellow card) 86'	Stadium: Stade Boréale; Attendance: 3,250; Referee: Carly Shaw-MacLaren; Assistant referees: Camille Raymond, Allycia Carlucci

August 2 14	Halifax Tides	1–1	Montreal Roses	Halifax, Nova Scotia
14:00 ET	Abdui 4'; Hill (yellow card) 14'; Whitaker (yellow card) 67'	Report	Guay (yellow card) 45'; Lemire (yellow card) 49'; Allen 73'	Stadium: Wanderers Grounds; Attendance: 3,800; Referee: Salma Flores-Desrochers; Assistant referees: Stéphanie Fortin, Natalie Berry

August 9 15	Montreal Roses	1–2	AFC Toronto	Laval, Quebec
13:00 ET	Hill 45+1'	Report	Small 23'; Hunter 36'	Stadium: Stade Boréale; Attendance: 2,150; Referee: Isabelle Duclos; Assistant referees: Victoria Lafortune, Amanda Kwan

August 16 16	Montreal Roses	0–2	Ottawa Rapid	Laval, Quebec
14:00 ET		Report	Pridham 8' 16'; Lee (yellow card) 23'; Haaland (yellow card) 61'	Stadium: Stade Boréale; Attendance: 2,100; Referee: Sheila Couture; Assistant referees: Allycia Carlucci, Victoria Lafortune

August 23 17	Montreal Roses	2–0	Calgary Wild	Laval, Quebec
12:30 ET	Kang 44' 50'	Report	Baucom (yellow card) 61'; Romero (yellow card) 64'; White (yellow card) 90+4'	Stadium: Stade Boréale; Attendance: 2,800; Referee: Marie-Soleil Beaudoin; Assistant referees: Gabrielle Lemieux, Laura Hall

August 30 18	Vancouver Rise	2–1	Montreal Roses	Burnaby, British Columbia
22:00 ET	Ward 23'; De Filippo (yellow card) 42'; Pechersky 45+1'; Longhurst (yellow card) 90+2'	Report	Boychuk 16'; Roy (yellow card) 35'	Stadium: Swangard Stadium; Attendance: 4,013; Referee: Anne-Marie Canuel; Assistant referees: Melissa Snedden, Shukwia Tajik

September 7 19	Ottawa Rapid	0–0	Montreal Roses	Ottawa, Ontario
12:00 ET	Belzile 41'; Lee (yellow card) 43'; Downing (yellow card) 49'	Report	Hill (yellow card) 39'; Boychuk (yellow card) 80'	Stadium: TD Place Stadium; Attendance: 3,722; Referee: Anne-Marie Canuel; Assistant referees: Melissa Snedden, Shukwia Tajik

September 13 20	Calgary Wild	0–5	Montreal Roses	Calgary, Alberta
16:00 ET	O'Neill (yellow card) 78'	Report	Hill 2'; Monyard 18'; Boychuk 51'; Paquin 75'; Thibault 82'	Stadium: McMahon Stadium; Attendance: 3,672; Referee: Salma Flores-Desrochers; Assistant referees: Allycia Carlucci, Megan Opatril

September 18 21	Montreal Roses	2–0	Halifax Tides	Laval, Quebec
19:00 ET	Hill 40'; Paquin 71'; Kang (yellow card) 82'	Report	Weichers (yellow card) 9'; Cedeño (yellow card) 18'; Vallerand (yellow card) 28'; Kennedy (yellow card) 50'; Nakamura (yellow card) 66'	Stadium: Stade Boréale; Attendance: 3,053; Referee: Anne-Marie Canuel; Assistant referees: Gabrielle Lemieux, Allycia Carlucci

September 27 22	Montreal Roses	0–2	Calgary Wild	Laval, Quebec
12:00 ET	Lachance (yellow card) 86'; Bilbault (yellow card) 90+4'	Report	Thurton (yellow card) 43'; Dougherty Howard (yellow card) 45'; Baucom (yellow card) 45'	Stadium: Stade Boréale; Attendance: 4,576; Referee: Marie-Soleil Beaudoin; Assistant referees: Victoria Lafortune, Megan Opatril

October 2 23	Halifax Tides	2–2	Montreal Roses	Halifax, Nova Scotia
18:00 ET	Miller 36' 70'; Vallerand (yellow card) 59'; Cedeño (yellow card) 90+2'	Report	Leas (yellow card) 53'; Bilbault 67'; Kang 73'; Monyard (yellow card) 86'	Stadium: Wanderers Grounds; Referee: Salma Flores-Desrochers; Assistant referees: Laura Hall, Natalie Berry

October 11 24	Montreal Roses	0–1	Vancouver Rise	Laval, Quebec
12:00 ET	Whitaker (yellow card) 11'; Monyard (yellow card) 64'	Report	De Filippo 10'	Stadium: Stade Boréale; Referee: Marie-Soleil Beaudoin; Assistant referees: Laura Hall, Camille Raymond

October 18 25	AFC Toronto	2–1	Montreal Roses	Toronto, Ontario
12:00 ET	Stratigakis 42'; Uddenberg (yellow card) 81'; Small 86'; Okoronkwo (yellow card) 90+6'	Report	Hess 10'	Stadium: York Lions Stadium; Referee: Myriam Marcotte; Assistant referees: Camille Raymond, Amanda Kwan

=== Playoffs ===
The Roses finished the regular season in fourth place and qualified for the NSL playoffs as the fourth seed of four teams.

November 1, 2025 Semi-finals	Montreal Roses	0–2	AFC Toronto	Laval, Quebec
12:00 p.m. EDT		Report	Small 7'; Hunter 70'	Stadium: Stade Boréale; Attendance: 2,296; Referee: Marie-Soleil Beaudoin; Assistant referees: Melissa Snedden, Camille Raymond

November 9, 2025 Semi-finals	AFC Toronto	4–1 (6–1 agg.)	Montreal Roses	Toronto, Ontario
2:00 p.m. EST	Okoronkwo 6', 20', 26'; Cota-Yarde (yellow card) 77'; Rowe 83'	Report	Hess (yellow card) 28'; Boychuk (yellow card) 49' (goal) 74'; Minas (yellow card) 65'	Stadium: York Lions Stadium; Referee: Carly Shaw-MacLaren; Assistant referees: Melissa Snedden, Allycia Carlucci
