= Nyota Katembo =

Canadian soccer player (born 2001)

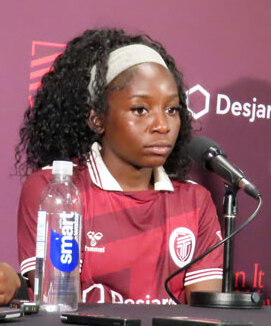
- Katembo in 2026

Personal information
- Date of birth: January 7, 2001 (age 25)
- Place of birth: Nyarugusu, Tanzania
- Height: 5 ft 3 in (1.60 m)
- Position: Midfielder

Team information
- Current team: AFC Toronto
- Number: 17

College career
Years	Team	Apps	(Gls)
2021	Portland Pilots	17	(0)
2022–2024	Arizona Wildcats	46	(3)

Senior career*
Years	Team	Apps	(Gls)
2018	Lakers du Lac St-Louis	12	(1)
2019–2020	CS Fabrose	18	(1)
2021–2022	AS Blainville	11	(2)
2024	Indy Eleven	3	(0)
2025–	AFC Toronto	37	(0)
- * Club domestic league appearances and goals as of October 28, 2026

Nyota Katembo (born January 7, 2001) is a Canadian soccer player who plays for AFC Toronto in the Northern Super League.

== Early life ==
Katembo was born in a refugee camp in Nyarugusu, Tanzania, after her family had fled the Democratic Republic of Congo to escape war, before moving to Joliette, Quebec in Canada when she was two years old.

From 2015 to 2018, she played with the Quebec provincial team. She also played with the PEF Quebec program.

== College career ==
In 2020, she initially committed to attend the University of Washington in the fall of 2021. However, she ultimately decided to attend the University of Portland, where she played for the women's soccer team. On August 19, she made her collegiate debut against the Utah Utes.

In 2022, she transferred to the University of Arizona to play for the women's soccer team. In November 2023, she was named one of the school's Student-Athletes of the Month.

== Club career ==
In 2018, Katembo played with Lakers du Lac St-Louis in the Première ligue de soccer du Québec. In 2019 and 2020, she played with CS Fabrose. In 2021 and 2022, she played with AS Blainville.

In 2024, she played with Indy Eleven of the USL W League, although her playing time was limited due to a chondral defect in the knee, with a piece of cartilage coming loose.

In March 2025, she signed a professional contract with AFC Toronto in the Northern Super League.

== Career statistics ==
As of October 28, 2026

Club	Season	League			Playoffs		National Cup		League Cup		Total	
Club	Season	League	Apps	Goals	Apps	Goals	Apps	Goals	Apps	Goals	Apps	Goals
Lakers du Lac St-Louis	2018	Première ligue de soccer du Québec	12	1	—		—		—		12	1
CS Fabrose	2019	Première ligue de soccer du Québec	15	1	—		—		—		15	1
CS Fabrose	2020	Première ligue de soccer du Québec	3	0	1	0	—		—		4	0
CS Fabrose	Total		18	1	1	0	0	0	0	0	19	1
AS Blainville	2021	Première ligue de soccer du Québec	6	1	—		—		0	0	6	1
AS Blainville	2022	Première ligue de soccer du Québec	5	1	—		—		0	0	5	1
AS Blainville	Total		11	2	0	0	0	0	0	0	11	2
Indy Eleven	2024	USL W League	3	0	1	0	—		—		4	0
AFC Toronto	2025	Northern Super League	17	0	2	0	–		–		19	0
2026	20	0	0	0	–		–		20	0		
Total		37	0	2	0	0	0	0	0	39	0	
Career total			81	4	4	0	0	0	0	0	85	4
