= Melissa Dagenais =

Canadian soccer player (born 2000)

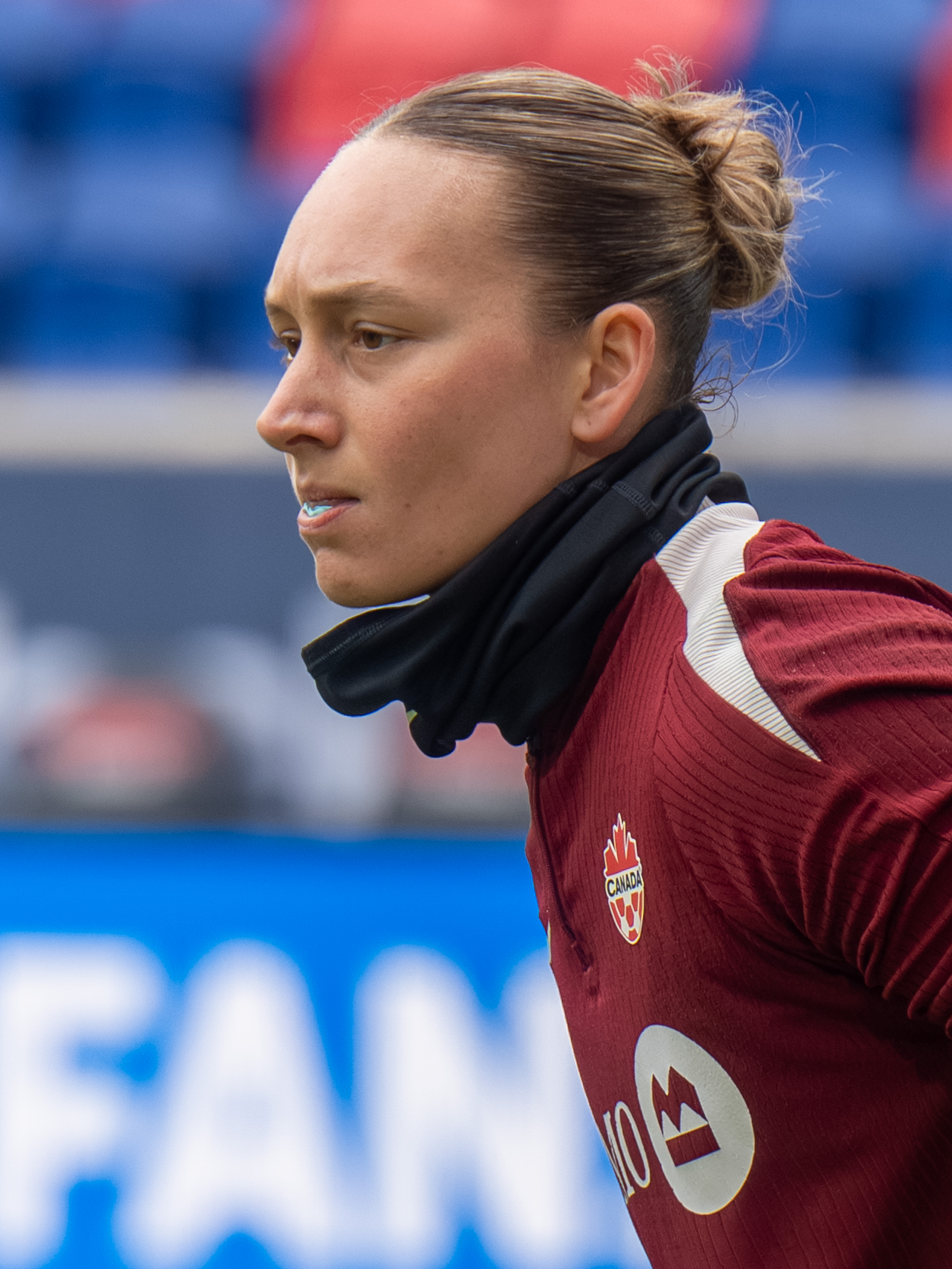
- Dagenais in 2026

Personal information
- Date of birth: December 7, 2000 (age 25)
- Place of birth: Saint-Hubert, Québec, Canada
- Height: 1.85 m (6 ft 1 in)
- Position: Goalkeeper

Team information
- Current team: Ottawa Rapid FC

Youth career
- CS St-Hubert
- FC Brossard
- 2015–2017: AS Pierrefonds

College career
Years	Team	Apps	(Gls)
2019–2023	Miami Hurricanes	56	(0)

Senior career*
Years	Team	Apps	(Gls)
2018–2019	FC Sélect Rive-Sud	24	(0)
2021	Pierrefonds FC	5	(0)
2024	Damaiense	8	(0)
2025–	Ottawa Rapid FC	38	(0)
- * Club domestic league appearances and goals as of October 29, 2026

Melissa Dagenais (born December 7, 2000) is a Canadian soccer player who plays as a goalkeeper for Ottawa Rapid FC in the Northern Super League.

== Early life ==
Dagenais grew up in Saint-Hubert, Québec and began playing youth soccer at age eight with CS Saint-Hubert. She initially started as a defender before transitioning to goalkeeper.

== College career ==
In 2019, Dagenais began attending the University of Miami, where she played for the women's soccer team. She made her collegiate debut on August 22, 2019 against the UT Rio Grande Valley Vaqueros, followed by her first start on September 7 against the San Diego State Aztecs. She earned her first shutout on March 14, 2021 against the FIU Panthers, helping earn her ACC Defensive Player of the Week honours. After two seasons as the backup goalkeeper, she became the starter in her third season in the fall of 2021. In October 2021, she was named the ACC Co-Defensive Player of the Week. At the end of the 2021 season, she was named to the ACC All-Academic Team. She was again named to the All-Academic Team after the 2022 and 2023 seasons.

== Club career ==
In 2018, Dagenais began playing with FC Sélect Rive-Sud in the Première Ligue de soccer du Québec. In 2021, she played with Pierrefonds FC.

In January 2024, she joined Portuguese club Damaiense in the Campeonato Nacional Feminino.

In February 2025, she signed with Northern Super League club Ottawa Rapid FC. She made her debut on June 7, 2025, keeping a clean sheet in a 4-0 victory over AFC Toronto.

== International career ==
In October 2023, Dagenais was called up to a camp with the Canada national team for the first time, ahead of a pair of friendlies against Brazil. In February 2026, she was named to the squad for the 2026 SheBelieves Cup.

== Career statistics ==
As of October 30, 2026

Club	Season	League			Playoffs		National Cup		League Cup		Other		Total	
Club	Season	League	Apps	Goals	Apps	Goals	Apps	Goals	Apps	Goals	Apps	Goals	Apps	Goals
FC Sélect Rive-Sud	2018	PLSQ	12	0	—		—		—		—		12	0
FC Sélect Rive-Sud	2019	PLSQ	12	0	—		—		—		—		12	0
FC Sélect Rive-Sud	Total		24	0	0	0	0	0	0	0	0	0	24	0
Pierrefonds FC	2021	PLSQ	5	0	—		—		—		—		5	0
Damaiense	2023–24	Campeonato Nacional Feminino	7	0	—		2	0	0	0	—		9	0
Damaiense	2024–25	Campeonato Nacional Feminino	1	0	—		1	0	1	0	2	0	5	0
Damaiense	Total		8	0	0	0	3	0	1	0	2	0	14	0
Ottawa Rapid FC	2025	Northern Super League	17	0	2	0	—		—		—		19	0
Ottawa Rapid FC	2026	Northern Super League	21	0	0	0	—		—		—		21	0
Ottawa Rapid FC	Total		38	0	2	0	0	0	0	0	0	0	40	0
Career total			75	0	2	0	3	0	1	0	2	0	83	0
