= Stephanie Hill =

Stephanie Hill may refer to:

- Stephanie Hill (model) (born 1995), English academic, singer, actress, model, dancer and beauty pageant titleholder who won Miss England 2017
- Stéphanie Hill (soccer) (born 2001), Canadian soccer player
