= Choi Han-bin =

South Korean footballer (born 2004)

Choi Han-bin 최한빈
Personal information
- Date of birth: 2 March 2004 (age 22)
- Place of birth: South Korea
- Height: 1.70 m (5 ft 7 in)
- Position: Winger

Youth career
- Changdong FC

College career
Years	Team	Apps	(Gls)
2024–2025	Korea University	31	(17)

Senior career*
Years	Team	Apps	(Gls)
2026	Montreal Roses FC	0	(0)

International career^{‡}
2017	South Korea U13	2	(0)
2018	South Korea U14	2	(0)
2024	South Korea U20	6	(0)
2025–	South Korea	2	(0)
- * Club domestic league appearances and goals as of 30 June 2026 ‡ National team caps and goals as of 16 February 2025

Choi Han-bin (Korean: 최한빈; born 2 March 2004) is a South Korean footballer who plays as a midfielder for the South Korea women's national team.

== Early life ==
Choi played youth football with Changdong FC.

== University career ==
Choi played for the Korea University women's football team. In 2024, she won an award for being the top goalscorer in Korean women's college football. She was named Player of the Year at the 2025 KWFF Spring National Football Championship, led her team to two consecutive Queen's Cup titles, and was also named Player of the Year at the 2025 Korea Women's Football Federation Awards. In her two seasons at KU, she made 31 appearances, scoring 17 goals and providing 5 assists.

== Club career ==
In January 2026, Choi signed her first professional contract with Canadian Northern Super League club Montreal Roses FC. She suffered an injury, missing the beginning of the season, before agreeing to a mutual termination of her contract at the end of June 2026.

== International career ==
Choi played for the South Korea U14 national team.

In 2024, she was named in the South Korea U20 team for the 2024 AFC U-20 Women's Asian Cup and 2024 FIFA U-20 Women's World Cup.

In February 2025, she was called up to the South Korea senior team for the first time for the 2025 Pink Ladies Cup.

== Career statistics ==
=== Club ===
Appearances and goals by club, season and competition
Club	Season	League			Playoff		Total	
Club	Season	Division	Apps	Goals	Apps	Goals	Apps	Goals
Montreal Roses	2026	Northern Super League	0	0	0	0	0	0
Career total			0	0	0	0	0	0

=== International ===
As of match played 26 February 2025

Appearances and goals by national team and year
National team	Year	Apps	Goals
South Korea	2025	2	0
Total		2	0
