= Maryse Bard-Martel =

Canadian soccer coach

- Bard-Martel I 2026

Personal information
- Date of birth: January 12, 1995 (age 31)
- Place of birth: Laval, Quebec, Canada
- Height: 1.70 m (5 ft 7 in)
- Position: Goalkeeper

Youth career
- CS Union des Milles-Îles
- FC Boisbriand

College career
Years	Team	Apps	(Gls)
2013–2016	Memphis Tigers	79	(0)

Senior career*
Years	Team	Apps	(Gls)
2013	Laval Comets		
2014	Ottawa Fury	3	(0)
2015	Colorado Pride		

Managerial career
- 2017–2018: Missouri State Lady Bears (assistant)
- 2020–2022: Oklahoma Sooners (women) (assistant)
- 2022–: Canada U20 (women) (assistant)
- 2023: Connecticut Huskies (women) (assistant)
- 2024: Utah Royals FC (goalkeeping)
- 2025–2026: Montreal Roses FC (assistant)
- 2026–: Montreal Roses FC (interim)
- * Club domestic league appearances and goals

Maryse Bard-Martel (born January 12, 1995) is a Canadian soccer coach and former player, who currently serves as interim head coach of the Montreal Roses FC in the Northern Super League.

== Early life ==
Bard-Martel began playing youth soccer at age four with CS Union des Milles-Îles. She later played youth soccer with FC Boisbriand. She was named to the 2013 Canada Summer Games All-Star Team.

== College career ==
In 2013, Bard-Martel began attending the University of Memphis, where she played for the women's soccer team. In August 2013, she was named the AAC Rookie of the Week and College Sports Madness AAC Player of the Week. In her first season, Bard-Martel set freshman program records in saves (79), shutouts (6) and minutes played (1856:59).

In October 2014, she was named the AAC Goalkeeper of the Week. In October 2016, she was named the AAC Goalkeeper of the Week on two occasions. Over her four years at Memphis, she finished her time ranked first in career goalkeeper minutes played (7,259), second in career wins (44) and second in career saves (267).

== Club career ==
In 2013, Bard-Martel played with the Laval Comets in the USL W-League.

In 2014, she joined the Ottawa Fury. She went unbeaten in five total starts, with a 0.207 goals-against average and a .944 save percentage, leading the team to a third-place finish in the league playoffs, after taking over as starter following an injury to starting keeper Jillian McVicker in the division championship match.

In April 2015, she signed with the Colorado Pride.

== International career ==
In 2012, Bard-Martel played with the Canada U17 team at the 2012 FIFA U-17 Women's World Cup. In June 2013, she attended a camp with the Canada U20.

== Coaching career ==
After graduating college, Bard-Martel served as a coach at IMG Academy before joining the Missouri State Lady Bears as assistant coach and goalkeeper coach for two seasons in 2017 and 2018.

In August 2020, Bard-Martel was hired as an assistant and goalkeeping coach with the Oklahoma Sooners women's soccer team.

In 2022, she was name the goalkeepers coach for the Canada women's national under-20 soccer team, including at the 2022 FIFA U-20 Women's World Cup. She continued to serve in the role, as of 2025.

In February 2023, she was named an assistant coach with the UConn Huskies women's soccer team.

In March 2024, she was named the goalkeeping coach with Utah Royals FC of the National Women's Soccer League.

In October 2024, she joined the Canada women's national soccer team as an interim performance analyst.

In 2025, she joined the Montreal Roses FC as an assistant and goalkeeping coach for their inaugural season in the Northern Super League. In August 2026, she was named the interim head coach of the side, following the dismissal of Robert Rositoiu. She earned her first victory as head coach in her first match, on August 16 against AFC Toronto.
