= Lakers du Lac Saint-Louis =

Semi-professional soccer club

- Full name: Association Régionale de Soccer du Lac St-Louis
- Founded: 2018
- Head Coach: Patrick Viollat
- League: Première ligue de soccer du Québec
- 2018: PLSQ, 5th
- Website: https://www.soccerlsl.qc.ca/en

Lakers du Lac Saint-Louis was a Canadian women's semi-professional soccer club based in Lachine, Montréal, Quebec that played in the Première ligue de soccer du Québec.

== History ==
ARS Lac St-Louis

The club was formed by the Association Régionale de Soccer du Lac St-Louis to participate in the newly formed women's division of the Première ligue de soccer du Québec, taking the regional approach, rather than to have one of their member clubs form a team. Patrick Viollat was named the club's head coach. The team had a disappointing season finishing in last place. After the first season, they departed the league, with the association transferring control of the team over to CS Mont-Royal Outremont, one of its member clubs for 2019.

== Season ==
Women

Season	League	Teams	Record	Rank	Ref
2018	Première ligue de soccer du Québec	5	3–2–7	5th	

== Notable former players ==
- (Canada) Latifah Abdu
- (Canada) Wayny Balata
- (Canada) Jessica De Filippo
- (Canada) Sophie Guilmette
- (Canada) Nyota Katembo
- (Haiti) (Canada) Laurie-Ann Moïse
- (Canada) Julianne Vallerand
