= Mara Bouchard =

Canadian soccer player (born 2001)

Personal information
- Date of birth: April 20, 2001 (age 25)
- Place of birth: Granby, Québec, Canada
- Height: 5 ft 4 in (1.63 m)
- Position: Midfielder

Team information
- Current team: Montreal Roses FC
- Number: 8

Youth career
- CS les Cosmos de Granby
- PEF Québec

College career
Years	Team	Apps	(Gls)
2021–2024	McGill Martlets	60	(0)

Senior career*
Years	Team	Apps	(Gls)
2018–2019	FC Sélect Rive-Sud	21	(0)
2021	CS Mont-Royal Outremont	9	(0)
2022–2024	CS Longueuil	25+	(0+)
2025–	Montreal Roses FC	11	(0)
- * Club domestic league appearances and goals as of October 20, 2025

Mara Bouchard (born April 20, 2001) is a Canadian soccer player who plays for Montreal Roses FC in the Northern Super League.

== Early life ==
Bouchard played youth soccer with CS les Cosmos de Granby, before joining the PEF Québec program at age 15. She also played for the Quebec provincial team and represented Team Quebec at the 2017 Canada Summer Games, winning the gold medal.

== University career ==
Bouchard attended Vanier College, before attending McGill University in 2021, where she played for the women's soccer team. In her first season, she was named an assistant captain. At the end of her first season, she was named the team's MVP, as well as the RSEQ Rookie of the Year, and named to the RSEQ All-Rookie Team, an RSEQ First Team All-Star, and the U Sports All-Rookie Team. At the end of her second season, she was once again named the team MVP and an RSEQ First Team All-Star as well as a U Sports Second Team All-Canadian. Ahead of the 2023 season, she was named the team captain. At the end of 2023, she was again named team MVP for the third consecutive year, as well as an RSEQ First Team All-Star and a U Sports First Team All-Canadian. At the end of her senior season, she once again earned RSEQ First Team All-Star as well as U Sports Second Team All-Canadian honours. She was also named a winner of McGill's Jean Béliveau Athletic Award for combining leadership with academic excellence and athletic prowess. Over her four years, she played in every match for the team, accumulating 56 consecutive regular season outings and four more in playoffs.

== Club career ==
In 2018, Bouchard joined FC Sélect Rive-Sud in the Première ligue de soccer du Québec. In 2021, she played with CS Mont-Royal Outremont. In 2022, she joined CS Longueuil. She won the league's Soulier d’argent as the second best player in 2022.

In January 2025, Bouchard signed with Northern Super League club Montreal Roses FC.

== Personal life ==
In 2021, Bouchard became an ambassador for the team sports brand Kipsa.

== Career statistics ==
As of October 20, 2025

Club	Season	League			Playoffs		National Cup		League Cup		Total	
Club	Season	League	Apps	Goals	Apps	Goals	Apps	Goals	Apps	Goals	Apps	Goals
FC Sélect Rive-Sud	2018	Première ligue de soccer du Québec	6	0	—		—		—		6	0
FC Sélect Rive-Sud	2019	Première ligue de soccer du Québec	15	0	—		—		—		15	0
FC Sélect Rive-Sud	Total		21	0	0	0	0	0	0	0	21	0
CS Mont-Royal Outremont	2021	Première ligue de soccer du Québec	9	0	—		—		—		9	0
CS Longueuil	2022	Première ligue de soccer du Québec	11	0	—		—		0	0	11	0
CS Longueuil	2023	Ligue1 Québec	?	?	—		—		1	0	1+	0+
CS Longueuil	2024	Ligue1 Québec	14	0	—		—		—		14	0
CS Longueuil	Total		25+	0+	0	0	0	0	1	0	26+	0+
Montreal Roses FC	2025	Northern Super League	11	0	0	0	–		–		11	0
Career total			66+	0+	0	0	0	0	1	0	67+	0+
