= Elyse Bennett =

American soccer player (born 1999)

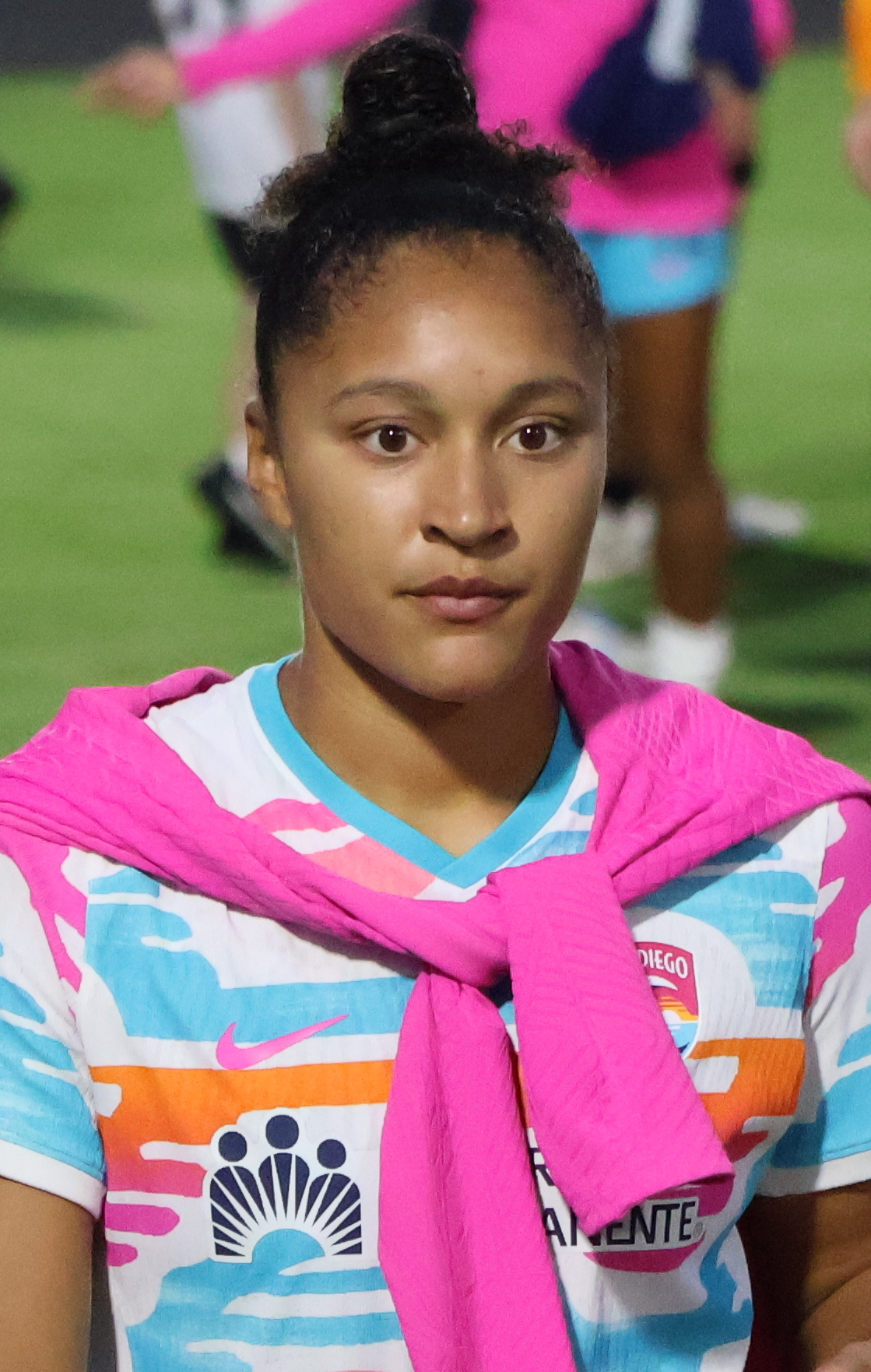
- Bennett with San Diego Wave FC in 2024

Personal information
- Full name: Elyse Morgan Bennett
- Date of birth: December 27, 1999 (age 26)
- Place of birth: Lake Forest, Illinois, U.S.
- Height: 5 ft 10 in (1.78 m)
- Position: Forward

Team information
- Current team: Montreal Roses
- Number: 9

Youth career
- 2015–2017: FC Wisconsin Eclipse

College career
Years	Team	Apps	(Gls)
2017–2021	Washington State Cougars	93	(26)

Senior career*
Years	Team	Apps	(Gls)
2022	Kansas City Current	21	(3)
2023	OL Reign	21	(2)
2024	San Diego Wave	14	(0)
2025	Deportivo de La Coruña	9	(1)
2025	Orlando Pride	0	(0)
2026–	Montreal Roses	0	(0)
- * Club domestic league appearances and goals as of 15:09, December 2, 2025 (UTC)

Elyse Morgan Bennett (born December 27, 1999) is an American professional soccer player who plays as a forward for Northern Super League club Montreal Roses FC. She played college soccer for the Washington State Cougars before being selected seventh overall in the 2022 NWSL Draft by the Kansas City Current.

After playing one season in Kansas City, Bennett spent time with fellow NWSL teams OL Reign, San Diego Wave FC, and the Orlando Pride. She has also played for Spanish Liga F club Deportivo de La Coruña.

== Early life ==
Born in Lake Forest, Illinois, Bennett was raised in the Green Bay, Wisconsin area and played several youth sports through middle school before taking up soccer in high school.

Bennett played one season for De Pere High School in De Pere, Wisconsin before joining the FC Wisconsin Eclipse youth program, where she became a top scorer in the Elite Clubs National League for the 2015–16 season. She suffered an anterior cruciate ligament injury during her senior year of high school.

== College career ==
Bennett graduated from high school early and enrolled in Washington State University as an early recruit to its women's soccer team.

After playing as a substitute and starter in her freshman season, Bennett became a regular starter at forward in her sophomore season before suffering a second ACL injury. She returned to start 23 of 24 matches in her junior year, 12 matches in the COVID-19-shortened 2020–21 spring season, and 21 matches in her fifth year in 2021.

Her fifth season featured career highs in goals (10), points (24), shots (93), shots on goal (37), and minutes played (1,557), and she was named to the All-Pac-12 first team and United Soccer Coaches All-American second team. Bennett was also the second Washington State player to play in more than 90 career matches, finishing with a second-most tally of 93 appearances.

== Club career ==
=== Kansas City Current ===
The Kansas City Current selected Bennett with the club's first pick and the seventh pick overall of the 2022 NWSL Draft. After playing in both and scoring in one of Kansas City's preseason matches, Bennett signed her first professional contract with the Current. During the 2022 NWSL Challenge Cup, Bennett recorded four assists in her first six professional matches, including a two-assist match against the Chicago Red Stars that earned her an NWSL Player of the Week award. She scored her first professional goal on May 14, 2022, in a 2–2 draw with the Orlando Pride.

=== OL Reign ===
On January 11, 2023, OL Reign traded $150,000 in allocation money to the Kansas City Current in exchange for Bennett. She made her debut for the Reign during the club's first match of the season, coming on as a substitute in a 1–0 defeat to the Washington Spirit. Bennett tallied her first goal with the Reign in a 4–1 victory over Angel City FC on May 27. In July 2023, Bennett was nominated for NWSL Player of the Week honors after scoring a goal and recording an assist against Racing Louisville FC.

Midway through the year, the Reign extended Bennett's contract through the 2024 season, with an additional year option for the 2025 season. Bennett and the Reign eventually advanced to the NWSL playoffs, vanquishing Angel City FC and San Diego Wave FC before facing off against NJ/NY Gotham FC in the final. Bennett came on as a substitute in the game and was involved in a sequence resulting in opposing goalkeeper Mandy Haught receiving a red card. The Reign failed to score off of the ensuing free kick, and Gotham FC secured the title with a 2–1 win.

=== San Diego Wave ===
On December 15, 2023, the Utah Royals selected Bennett with their first pick (second overall) in the 2024 NWSL Expansion Draft. Two days later, Utah traded Bennett to San Diego Wave FC for $40,000 in allocation money. She debuted for the Wave as part of the starting lineup that played against Gotham FC in the one-match NWSL Challenge Cup. The Wave won the game, 1–0, marking Bennett's first title with San Diego. At the end of the season, Bennett was out of contract with the Wave. The club later announced that Bennett would not be returning to San Diego and would instead be exploring opportunities as a free agent. Bennett departed from the Wave with 14 league appearances and 0 goals in her lone season in San Diego.

=== Deportivo de La Coruña ===
Bennett signed with Spanish team Deportivo de La Coruña on February 3, 2025. She scored her first Deportivo goal in the team's penultimate match of the 2024–25 Liga F season, netting the equalizer that cemented Deportivo's place above the relegation line.

=== Orlando Pride ===
On August 31, 2025, Bennett returned to the NWSL, signing a short-term contract with the Orlando Pride through the end of 2025. She made her first appearance for Orlando on September 2, coming on as a second-half substitute in the Pride's first-ever CONCACAF W Champions Cup match. She made two other appearances for Orlando, both of which were also in CONCACAF matches, before departing from the club at the end of the season.

=== Montreal Roses ===
On February 3, 2026, it was announced that Bennet had signed for Northern Super League side Montreal Roses FC. She scored twice in her competitive debut for the club, a 2–0 win over Calgary Wild FC in the opening game of the Roses' 2026 season.

== Personal life ==
Bennett is the daughter of National Football League coach and former player Edgar Bennett. She has one older brother, Edgar IV. Bennett credited advice from her father, who recovered from ACL injuries during his professional football career, with aiding her recovery from her own.

== Career statistics ==
=== Club ===
As of December 2, 2025

Appearances and goals by club, season and competition
Club	Season	League			Cup (Note: Includes the NWSL Challenge Cup)		Playoffs (Note: Includes NWSL Playoffs)		Continental (Note: Includes CONCACAF W Champions Cup)		Other		Total	
Club	Season	Division	Apps	Goals	Apps	Goals	Apps	Goals	Apps	Goals	Apps	Goals	Apps	Goals
Kansas City Current	2022	NWSL	21	3	7	0	3	0	—		—		31	3
OL Reign	2023	NWSL	21	2	7	1	1	0	—		—		29	2
San Diego Wave FC	2024	NWSL	14	0	1	0	—		3	0	3 (Note: Includes NWSL x Liga MX Femenil Summer Cup)	0	21	0
Deportivo de La Coruña	2024–25	Liga F	9	1	—		—		—		—		9	1
Orlando Pride	2025	NWSL	0	0	0	0	—		3	0	—		3	0
Career total			65	6	15	1	4	0	6	0	3	0	93	6

== Honors ==
San Diego Wave

- NWSL Challenge Cup: 2024
