= Stefanie Kouzas =

Guyanese footballer (born 2000)

Personal information
- Date of birth: 10 January 2000 (age 26)
- Place of birth: Montreal, Quebec, Canada
- Height: 1.75 m (5 ft 9 in)
- Position: Midfielder

College career
Years	Team	Apps	(Gls)
2017–2019	Champlain Cavaliers		
2022–	McGill Martlets	14	(0)

Senior career*
Years	Team	Apps	(Gls)
2018	CS Monteuil	4	(0)
2019	FC Sélect Rive-Sud	10	(1)
2021	CS Longueuil	4	(0)
2022	CS St. Hubert	10	(0)
2024–	CS Longueuil	11	(1)

International career^{‡}
2019–2020	Guyana U20		
2022–	Guyana	2	(0)
- * Club domestic league appearances and goals as of 3 August 2024 ‡ National team caps and goals as of 8 April 2022

Stefanie Kouzas (born 10 January 2000) is a footballer who plays as a midfielder. Born in Canada, she plays for the Guyana women's national team.

== Early life ==
Kouzas was born in Montreal, Quebec, to a Greek father and Guyanese mother. She played youth soccer with Lakeshore SC. In 2017, she won the Miss Teenage Québec beauty pageant, qualifying for Miss Teenage Canada.

== University career ==
For college, she attended Champlain College Saint-Lambert, playing for the women's soccer team. She won RSEQ Academic Excellence honours in both 2018 and 2019.

In 2022, she began attending McGill University, where she played for the women's soccer team.

== Club career ==
In 2018, she played in the Première ligue de soccer du Québec with CS Monteuil.

In 2019, she played FC Sélect Rive-Sud in the PLSQ. She scored her first goal on June 8 against CS Fabrose.

== International career ==
In 2020, she trained and was part of the preliminary squad for Guyana U20.

In 2022, she began playing for the Guyana senior team. She made her first start on April 8 against Nicaragua.

== See also ==
- List of Guyana women's international footballers
