= Lorie Thibault =

Canadian soccer player (born 2000)

Personal information
- Date of birth: March 19, 2000 (age 26)
- Place of birth: Blainville, Quebec, Canada
- Height: 5 ft 5 in (1.65 m)
- Position: Midfielder

Team information
- Current team: Montreal Roses FC
- Number: 19

Youth career
- AS Blainville

College career
Years	Team	Apps	(Gls)
2017–2019	Indiens du Collège Ahuntsic		
2021–2024	Montreal Carabins		

Senior career*
Years	Team	Apps	(Gls)
2018–2023	AS Blainville	39+	(2+)
2025–	Montreal Roses FC	22	(1)
- * Club domestic league appearances and goals as of October 20, 2025 ‡ National team caps and goals as of September 3, 2024

Lorie Thibault (born March 19, 2000) is a Canadian soccer player who plays for Montreal Roses FC in the Northern Super League.

== Early life ==
Thiabult played youth soccer with AS Blainville.

== University career ==
In 2017, Thibault began attending Collège Ahuntsic. In 2017, she was named the school's Female Rookie of the Year. In 2017, she was also named an RSEQ All-Star and a Canadian Collegiate Athletic Association All-Star.

In 2021, she began attending the Université de Montréal, where she played for the women's soccer team. In 2021, she was named to the RSEQ All-Rookie Team and in both 2023 and 2024, she was named to the RSEQ Second Team.

== Club career ==
Thibault began playing at the senior level with AS Blainville in the Première ligue de soccer du Québec, when she was 19.

In January 2025, Thibault signed with Northern Super League club Montreal Roses FC. On September 13, 2025, she scored her first goal, in a 5-0 victory over Calgary Wild FC.

== Career statistics ==
As of November 10, 2025

Club	Season	League			Playoffs		National Cup		League Cup		Other		Total	
Club	Season	League	Apps	Goals	Apps	Goals	Apps	Goals	Apps	Goals	Apps	Goals	Apps	Goals
AS Blainville	2018	Première ligue de soccer du Québec	2	0	—		—		—		—		2	0
AS Blainville	2019	Première ligue de soccer du Québec	14	1	—		—		—		—		14	1
AS Blainville	2020	Première ligue de soccer du Québec	3	0	1	0	—		—		—		4	0
AS Blainville	2021	Première ligue de soccer du Québec	9	0	—		—		2	0	—		11	0
AS Blainville	2022	Première ligue de soccer du Québec	11	1	—		—		1	0	2	1	14	2
AS Blainville	2023	Ligue1 Québec	?	?	—		—		2	0	—		2+	0+
AS Blainville	Total		39+	3+	1	0	0	0	5	1	2	1	47+	5+
Montreal Roses FC	2025	Northern Super League	22	1	2	0	–		–		–		24	1
Career total			61+	4+	3	0	0	0	5	1	2	1	71+	6+
