= Cindy Walsh =

Canadian soccer player

Personal information
- Date of birth: September 13, 1979 (age 47)
- Place of birth: Montreal, Quebec, Canada
- Height: 1.68 m (5 ft 6 in)
- Position: Defender

Youth career
- Saint-Bruno
- FC Brossard
- CS Longueuil
- 2000: FC Sélect Rive-Sud

College career
Years	Team	Apps	(Gls)
2000–2003	Hartford Hawks	80	(12)

Senior career*
Years	Team	Apps	(Gls)
2001	Laval Dynamites		
2002	Toronto Inferno		
2003–2006	Western Mass Lady Pioneers		
2007–2010	Laval Comets		
2012–2014	Laval Comets		
2019	FC Sélect Rive-Sud	13	(0)
2022	CS St-Hubert	3	(0)

International career
1999	Canada U20	6	(0)
1998–2010	Canada	24	(0)

Managerial career
- 2013–2015: Laval Comets
- 2016–2019: AS Varennes AAA
- 2020–2022: CS St-Hubert (women)
- * Club domestic league appearances and goals as of July 10, 2022

Cindy Walsh (born September 13, 1979) is a Canadian retired soccer player who played as a defender. She has been a member of the Canada women's national team.

== College career ==
She attended the University of Hartford, playing for the NCAA Division I Hartford Hawks on a full athletic scholarship. She started 80 games, missing only 3 because of emergency surgery to remove a ruptured appendix in 2000. She was voted Rookie of the Year and named to the conference 1st team in 2000, 2001 and 2003 and named 2nd team in 2002. She had a career high of 11 assists and 7 goals in 2002, and played a variety of positions from defender, midfielder and striker.

== Club career ==
Between 2001 and 2014 she competed in the now defunct semi-professional W-League, which was among the top leagues in North America. In 13 years she played with the Laval Dynamites, Toronto Inferno, Western Mass Lady Pioneers, and Laval Comets. She was named to the W-League All-Conference team in 2008. She was also named league all-star team and named as W-League Defender of the Year in 2012. In 2019, she played with FC Sélect Rive-Sud in the Première Ligue de soccer du Québec.

== International career ==
She joined the Canadian senior national team when she was 18 years old. In 1998, she played in the CONCACAF Women's Championship, which they won and secured a qualifying spot for the 1999 FIFA Women's World Cup. She was captain of the U20 Women’s national team in 1999 at the Pan American games, participating in all games, and helping the team to a 4th place finish. In 2010, Walsh was called back to the senior national team for a training camp in Cyprus and helped contribute to winning the 2010 Cyprus Cup after a 10 year absence with the team.

== Coaching career ==
She began her coaching career with the Laval Comets in 2013, serving as a player-coach, making it all the way to the W-League finals in first season and being named coach of the year. From 2009 to 2016, she was assistant technical director at the Association régionale de soccer de la Rive-Sud and School Programs Educator at Collège-Français de Longueuil, De Mortagne School in Boucherville and Heritage Regional High School. She has also led the women's selection for the Quebec Games on several occasions and work at Soccer Quebec's High Performance Center.

In 2020, she was announced as the head coach of the women's team of CS St-Hubert, making them the first club in the PLSQ with a female head coach.

== Personal life ==
Her sister Amy Walsh was also a player for the Canadian women's national team.
