= FC Sélect Rive-Sud =

Semi-professional soccer club

- Full name: Association Régionale de Soccer de la Rive-Sud
- League: Première Ligue de soccer du Québec
- 2019: PLSQ, 5th
- Website: https://www.arsrs.com/

FC Sélect Rive-Sud was a Canadian women's semi-professional soccer club based in Longueuil, Quebec that played in the Première Ligue de soccer du Québec.

== History ==
The club was formed by the Association Régionale de Soccer de la Rive-Sud, which is made up of 13 member clubs, to participate in the newly formed women's division of the Première Ligue de soccer du Québec using the regional approach, on behalf of all its members clubs. As a regional club, they planned to play their home matches at the various home fields of their member clubs, rather than at a central location. For 2019, they decided to field an extremely young team, with most players between the ages of 15 and 19, while also adding 39 year old former Canadian national team player Cindy Walsh to the roster. They set a league attendance record on May 18, 2019 for their match against CS Mont-Royal Outremont with 360 spectators.

After the 2019 season, two of ARS Rive-Sud's member clubs, CS Longueuil and CS St-Hubert, decided to enter teams in the women's division, forcing FC Sélect to withdraw their team due to conflict of interest.

== Seasons ==
Women

Season	League	Teams	Record	Rank	Ref
2018	Première Ligue de soccer du Québec	5	4–1–7	4th	
2019	Première Ligue de soccer du Québec	6	3–3–9	5th	

== Notable former players ==
The following players have either played at the professional or international level, either before or after playing for the PLSQ team:

- (Canada) Mara Bouchard
- (Canada) Melissa Busque
- (Canada) Melissa Dagenais
- (Guyana) (Canada) Stefani Kouzas
- (Canada) Karima Lemire
- (Canada) Cindy Walsh
