= 2025 Pinatar Cup =

Tournament details
- Host country: Spain
- Dates: 19–25 February
- Teams: 4 (from 2 confederations)
- Venue: 1 (in 1 host city)

Final positions
- Champions: Canada (1st title)
- Runners-up: Mexico
- Third place: China
- Fourth place: Chinese Taipei

Tournament statistics
- Matches played: 6
- Goals scored: 21 (3.5 per match)
- Top scorer(s): (Canada) Marie-Yasmine Alidou (3 goals)

The 2025 Pinatar Cup was the fifth edition of the Pinatar Cup, an invitational women's football tournament held in San Pedro del Pinatar, Spain from 19 to 25 February 2025.

== Format ==
The four invited teams played a round-robin tournament. Points awarded in the group stage followed the formula of three points for a win, one point for a draw, and zero points for a loss. A tie in points was decided by goal differential.

== Venue ==
San Pedro del Pinatar
Pinatar Arena
Capacity: 3,000
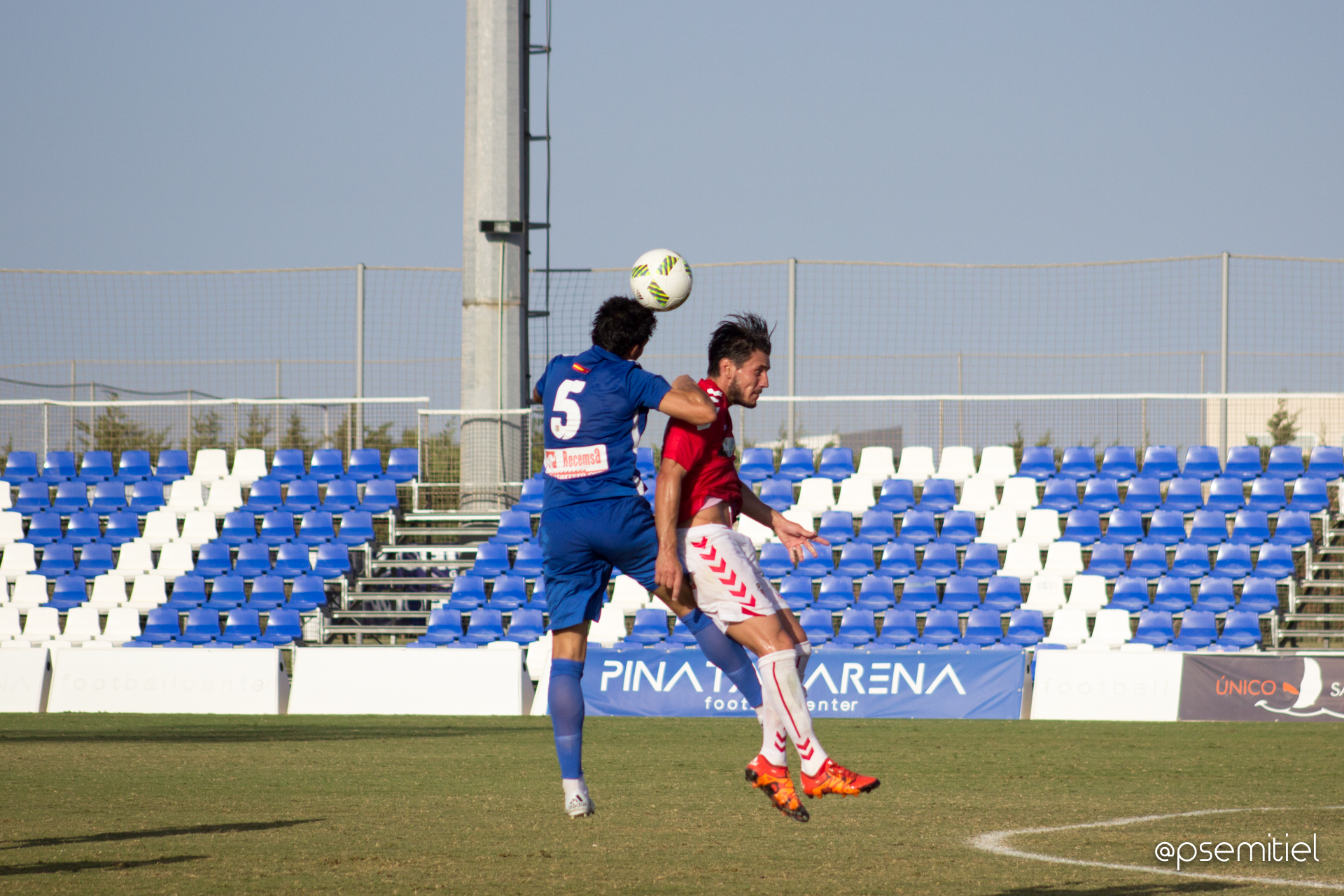

== Teams ==
Team	FIFA Rankings (December 2024)
Canada	6
China	17
Mexico	31
Chinese Taipei	42

== Standings ==
Pos	Team	Pld	W	D	L	GF	GA	GD	Pts
1	Canada (C)	3	2	1	0	10	1	+9	7
2	Mexico	3	2	0	1	6	2	+4	6
3	China	3	1	1	1	5	3	+2	4
4	Chinese Taipei	3	0	0	3	0	15	−15	0

Rules for classification: 1) points; 2) goal difference; 3) goals scored; 4) head-to-head points; 5) head-to-head goal difference; 6) head-to-head number of goals scored; 7) FIFA ranking.
(C) Champions

== Results ==
All times are local (UTC+1).

19 February 2025
13:00

Mexico	4–0	Chinese Taipei
Soto 10'; Servín 39'; Saldívar 53', 67'	Report

Pinatar Arena, San Pedro del Pinatar
Referee: Seth Sheehan-Galia (England)
19 February 2025
19:00

Canada	1–1	China
Grosso 16'	Report	Jin Kun 58'

Pinatar Arena, San Pedro del Pinatar
Referee: Katalin Sipos (Hungary)

22 February 2025
13:00

Chinese Taipei	0–4	China
	Report	Teng Pei-lin 21' (o.g.); Shao Ziqin 39'; Li Mengwen 50'; Zhang Xin 76'

Pinatar Arena, San Pedro del Pinatar
Referee: Seth Sheehan-Galia (England)
22 February 2025
19:00

Canada	2–0	Mexico
Gilles 51'; Leon 89'	Report

Pinatar Arena, San Pedro del Pinatar
Referee: Katalin Sipos (Hungary)

25 February 2025
13:00

China	0–2	Mexico
	Report	Soto 5'; Ovalle 14'

Pinatar Arena, San Pedro del Pinatar
Referee: Katalin Sipos (Hungary)
25 February 2025
19:00

Chinese Taipei	0–7	Canada
	Report	Alidou 4', 14' (pen.), 33'; Huitema 26', 48' (pen.); Reid 45+1'; Larisey 75'

Pinatar Arena, San Pedro del Pinatar
Referee: Seth Sheehan-Galia (England)

== Goalscorers ==
There were 21 goals scored in 6 matches, for an average of 3.5 goals per match.

3 goals

- (Canada) Marie-Yasmine Alidou

2 goals

- (Canada) Jordyn Huitema
- (Mexico) Montserrat Saldívar
- (Mexico) Alice Soto

1 goal

- (Canada) Vanessa Gilles
- (Canada) Julia Grosso
- (Canada) Clarissa Larisey
- (Canada) Adriana Leon
- (Canada) Megan Reid
- (China) Jin Kun
- (China) Li Mengwen
- (China) Shao Ziqin
- (China) Zhang Xin
- (Mexico) Jacqueline Ovalle
- (Mexico) Fátima Servín

1 own goal

- (Chinese Taipei) Teng Pei-lin (against China)

== See also ==
- 2025 SheBelieves Cup
- 2025 Pink Ladies Cup
