= Jin Kun =

Chinese footballer

Personal information
- Full name: Jin Kun
- Date of birth: 4 October 1999 (age 27)
- Place of birth: Shanghai, China
- Position: Midfielder

International career^{‡}
Years	Team	Apps	(Gls)
2012	China U13	?	(0)
2013	China U14	?	(0)
2014	China U16	?	(3)
2016	China U19	?	(1)
2018	China U20	3	(0)
2019	China U21	1	(0)
2017–2018	China	6	(0)
- ‡ National team caps and goals as of 30 May 2019

Jin Kun (born 4 October 1999) is a Chinese footballer who plays as a midfielder. She has been a member of the China women's national team.

== International goals ==
No.	Date	Venue	Opponent	Score	Result	Competition
1.	19 January 2018	Century Lotus Stadium, Foshan, China	Vietnam	1–0	4–0	2018 Four Nations Tournament
2.	29 November 2024	Sparta Stadion Het Kasteel, Rotterdam, Netherlands	Netherlands	1–0	1–4	Friendly
3.	19 February 2025	Pinatar Arena, San Pedro del Pinatar, Spain	Canada	1–1	1–1	2025 Pinatar Cup
