= Marilou Harvey =

Canadian soccer player (born 2009)

Personal information
- Date of birth: June 17, 2009 (age 17)
- Place of birth: Canada
- Position: Forward

Team information
- Current team: Montreal Roses FC
- Number: 21

Youth career
- CS St-Hubert

Senior career*
Years	Team	Apps	(Gls)
2026–	Montreal Roses FC		
- * Club domestic league appearances and goals

Marilou Harvey (born June 17, 2009) is a Canadian professional soccer player who currently plays as a forward for Montreal Roses FC.

== Early life ==
Harvey was born on June 17, 2009. Born in Canada, she is a native of Quebec, Canada. The daughter of Karl, she has a younger sister. Growing up, she attended Choate Rosemary Hall in the United States and École Secondaire du Triolet in Canada.

== Career ==
As a youth player, Harvey joined the youth academy of CS St-Hubert. Following her stint there, she signed for Montreal Roses FC ahead of the 2026 season.
