= Charlotte Bilbault =

French footballer (born 1990)

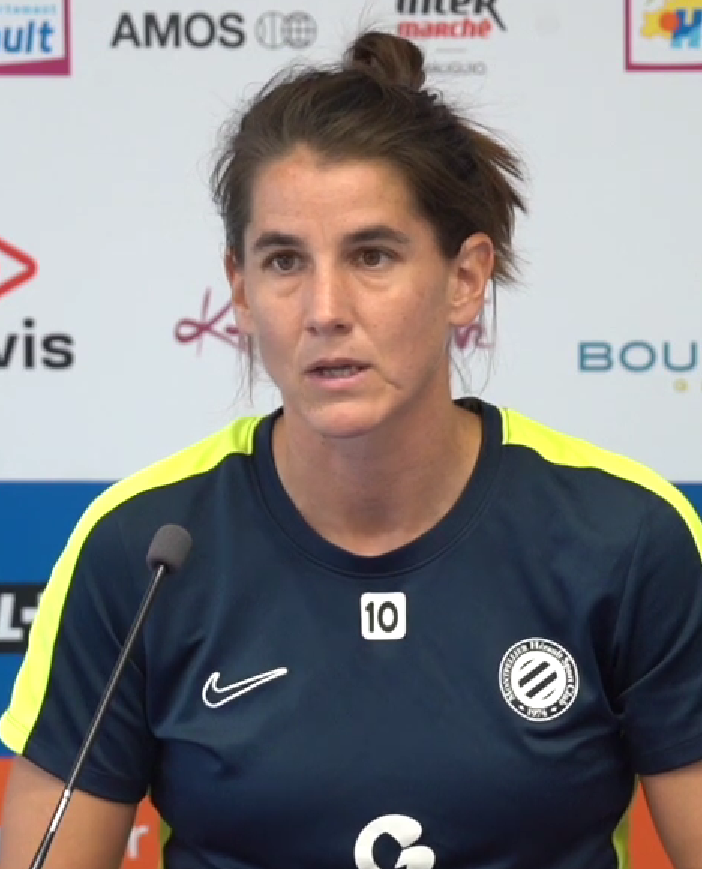
- Bilbault with Montpellier in 2023

Personal information
- Date of birth: 5 June 1990 (age 36)
- Place of birth: Saint-Doulchard, France
- Height: 1.68 m (5 ft 6 in)
- Position: Defensive midfielder

Team information
- Current team: Montreal Roses
- Number: 18

Youth career
- 1996–2004: Vignoux-sur-Barangeon
- 2004–2005: Eglantine Vierzon
- 2005–2006: Saint-Christophe Châteauroux

Senior career*
Years	Team	Apps	(Gls)
2006–2007	CNFE Clairefontaine	16	(0)
2007–2009	Soyaux	37	(4)
2009–2010	Yzeure	19	(1)
2010–2014	Montpellier	64	(5)
2014–2015	Soyaux	14	(0)
2015–2019	Paris FC (Note: Known as Juvisy during 2015–16 and 2016–17 season.)	64	(1)
2019–2022	Bordeaux	49	(0)
2022–2024	Montpellier	35	(2)
2025–	Montreal Roses	23	(2)

International career
2005–2006	France U17	12	(0)
2007–2009	France U19	22	(0)
2008–2010	France U20	11	(0)
2015–2018	France U23	15	(1)
2015–2023	France	56	(2)
- * Club domestic league appearances and goals as of 20 October 2025

Charlotte Bilbault (born 5 June 1990) is a French footballer who plays as a defensive midfielder for Northern Super League club Montreal Roses. She is a former graduate of CNFE Clairefontaine.

She is a former women's youth international for France having represented her nation at under-17, under-19, and under-20 level. Bilbault featured with the under-20 teams that played at the 2008 and 2010 editions of the FIFA U-20 Women's World Cup.

== Career ==
Bilbault joined her current club ahead of the 2010–11 season after one season with first division club Nord Allier Yzeure.

In 2010, she joined Montpellier HSC and was with the club for four years. Her contract was not renewed in the summer of 2014, so she joined dSoyaux.

On 3 June 2022, Bilbault returned to Montpellier HSC on a permanent transfer. In September 2023, she played her 100th match for the club against Dijon. On 21 October 2024, it was announced that she would be leaving the club after making 118 appearances and scoring 7 goals for the club.

On 21 October 2024, Bilbault signed with Canadian club Montreal Roses FC for the inaugural season of the Northern Super League, becoming one of the club's first two signings alongside Gabrielle Lambert, as well as the first foreign player signing in league history. On 18 November 2025, the club extended an option in her contract for the 2026 season.

== International career ==
Bilbault made her international debut for France's senior team against Russia on 22 May 2015. She scored her first international goal against Uruguay on 4 March 2019, scoring in the 36th minute.

On 2 May 2019, Bilbault was called up to the France squad for the 2019 FIFA Women's World Cup.

On 30 May 2022, Bilbault was called up to the France squad for the UEFA Women's Euro 2022.

== Career statistics ==
=== International ===
As of match played 21 February 2023

Appearances and goals by national team and year
National team	Year	Apps	Goals
France	2015	5	0
France	2016	1	0
France	2017	0	0
France	2018	5	0
France	2019	11	1
France	2020	9	0
France	2021	8	0
France	2022	15	0
France	2023	2	1
Total		56	2

Scores and results list France's goal tally first, score column indicates score after each Bilbault goal.

List of international goals scored by Charlotte Bilbault
No.	Date	Venue	Opponent	Score	Result	Competition
1	4 March 2019	Stade de la Vallée du Cher, Tours, France	Uruguay	2–0	6–0	Friendly
2	15 February 2023	Stade Francis Le Basser, Laval, France	Denmark	1–0	1–0	2023 Tournoi de France
