= Claire Monyard =

Canadian soccer player (born 2000)

Personal information
- Date of birth: May 15, 2000 (age 26)
- Place of birth: London, Ontario, Canada
- Height: 5 ft 7 in (1.70 m)
- Position: Midfielder

Team information
- Current team: Montreal Roses FC
- Number: 14

Youth career
- North London SC

College career
Years	Team	Apps	(Gls)
2019	Arkansas Razorbacks	6	(0)
2021	FIU Panthers	6	(0)

Senior career*
Years	Team	Apps	(Gls)
2016–2019	FC London	42	(5)
2023	FC Miami City	12	(3)
2023–2024	Dade County FC		
2024	Miami AC	11	(2)
2025–	Montreal Roses FC	23	(1)
- * Club domestic league appearances and goals as of October 20, 2025

Claire Monyard (born May 15, 2000) is a Canadian soccer player who plays for Montreal Roses FC in the Northern Super League.

== Early life ==
Monyard played youth soccer with North London SC.

== College career ==
In 2019, Monyard attended the University of Arkansas, where she played for the women's soccer team and recorded one assist.

In 2021, she began attending Florida International University, where she played for the women's soccer team.

== Club career ==
From 2016 to 2019, Monyard played with FC London in League1 Ontario.

In 2023, Monyard played with FC Miami City in the USL W League.

In 2023-24, she played with Dade County FC in the United Premier Soccer League.

In 2024, she played with Miami AC in the USL W League.

In January 2025, she signed with Montreal Roses FC in the Northern Super League. On September 13, 2025, she scored her first goal, in a 5-0 victory over Calgary Wild FC.

== Personal ==
Monyard has published work from her research on thymoquinone and DNA in the Biophysical Journal.

== Career statistics ==
As of November 10, 2025

Club	Season	League			Playoffs		National Cup		League Cup		Total	
Club	Season	League	Apps	Goals	Apps	Goals	Apps	Goals	Apps	Goals	Apps	Goals
FC London	2016	League1 Ontario	15	4	—		—		?	?	15	4
FC London	2017	League1 Ontario	14	0	—		—		?	?	14	0
FC London	2018	League1 Ontario	9	1	0	0	—		?	?	9	1
FC London	2019	League1 Ontario	4	0	0	0	—		—		4	0
FC London	Total		42	5	0	0	0	0	?	?	42	5
FC Miami City	2023	USL W League	12	3	1	0	—		—		13	3
Miami AC	2024	USL W League	11	2	—		—		—		11	2
Montreal Roses FC	2025	Northern Super League	23	1	2	0	—		—		25	1
Career total			88	11	3	0	0	0	0	0	91	11
