= Lara Schenk =

German footballer

Personal information
- Date of birth: 20 January 2000 (age 26)
- Place of birth: Seelze, Germany
- Position: Centre-back

Youth career
- 2014–2016: Wolfsburg
- 2016–2017: JFV Calenberger Land
- 2017–2018: TSV Pattensen

College career
Years	Team	Apps	(Gls)
2018–2022	Harvard Crimson	55	(1)

Senior career*
Years	Team	Apps	(Gls)
2020	VfL Wolfsburg II	2	(0)
2022	Manhattan SC	2	(0)
2023	Club YLA	14	(0)
2023–2024	Anderlecht	16	(0)
2024–2025	Sporting de Huelva	17	(0)
2025	Montreal Roses FC	18	(0)
2026	FC Carl Zeiss Jena	9	(0)

International career^{‡}
2015	Germany U15	3	(0)
2015–2016	Germany U16	9	(1)
2016–2017	Germany U17	13	(0)
- * Club domestic league appearances and goals as of 14 May 2026 ‡ National team caps and goals as of May 8, 2017

Lara Schenk (born 20 January 2000) is a German footballer who plays as a centre-back.

== Early life ==
Schenk began playing soccer at age five, joining a boys team. from 2014 to 2016, she played youth football with VfL Wolfsburg, before joining the JFV Calenberger Land U17 boys team in 2016-17 and the TSV Pattensen U17 boys team in 2017-18.

== College career ==
In 2018, Schenk began attending Harvard University, where she played for the women's soccer team on a scholarship. Schenk made her collegiate debut on 19 September 2018, picking up an assist, in a 1-0 victory over the Yale Bulldogs. On September 18, 2019, she scored her first collegiate goal in a 4-1 victory over the UMass Lowell River Hawks. In 2021, she was named to the All-Ivy League Second Team and an Academic All-District selection. In 2022, she was again named an Academic All-District selection.

== Club career ==
In 2020, with due to the cancellation of the women's college season due to the COVID-19 pandemic, Schenk began training with Frauen-Bundesliga club VfL Wolfsburg to prepare for the 2020 FIFA U-20 Women's World Cup, which was ultimately cancelled. She could only train with the first team, due to NCAA rules preventing student-athletes from playing professionally, but was able to play with the second team in the 2. Frauen-Bundesliga, as it was not considered professional.

In 2022, she played with Manhattan SC in the USL W League.

In January 2023, Schenk signed with Belgian Women's Super League side Club YLA (the women's team of Club Brugge.

In June 2023, she signed with Belgian Women's Super League club Anderlecht on a two-year contract.

In July 2024, she signed with Spanish club Sporting de Huelva in the first tier Liga F.

In April 2025, she joined Canadian club Montreal Roses FC in the Northern Super League. After one season, she departed the club.

== International career ==
Schenk played with the German youth teams from U14 to U19 level. In 2018, she was named to the Germany U19 for the 2018 UEFA Women's Under-19 Championship. In 2019 and 2020, she was called to various camps with the Germany U20.
