= Jodi Smith =

American soccer player

Personal information
- Full name: Jodi Michelle Smith
- Date of birth: January 17, 2003 (age 23)
- Place of birth: Pembroke Pines, Florida, United States
- Height: 5 ft 7 in (1.70 m)
- Position: Defender

Youth career
- Miami Lakes United SC
- Team Boca

College career
Years	Team	Apps	(Gls)
2020–2024	Florida Atlantic Owls	77	(3)

Senior career*
Years	Team	Apps	(Gls)
2022–2023	FC Miami City	20	(6)
2024	Tormenta FC	11	(0)
2025	Montreal Roses	19	(0)
- * Club domestic league appearances and goals as of October 20, 2025

Jodi Michelle Smith (born January 17, 2003) is an American soccer player.

== Early life ==
Smith played youth soccer with Miami Lakes United SC and Team Boca and also participated with the National ODP team.

== College career ==
In November 2020, Smith committed to attend Florida Atlantic University to play for the women's soccer team. On August 19, 2021, she made her collegiate debut in a match against the Oakland Golden Grizzlies. On September 5, 2021, she scored her first collegiate goal in a 2-0 victory over the Troy Trojans. At the end of her first season, she was named to the Conference USA All-Freshman Team. Ahead of her third season in 2023, she was named to the American Athletic Conference Preseason Watch List. In September 2025, she was named the AAC Defensive Player of the Week and at the end of the season was named to the All-AAC Second Team. Ahead of her senior season, she was again named to the Preseason Watch List, and was once again named to the All-AAC Second Team at the end of the season.

== Club career ==
In 2022, Smith played with FC Miami City in the USL W League. She continued with the side in 2023, scoring two goals in the team's first three games of the season.

In May 2024, Smith joined Tormenta FC in the USL W League.

In January 2025, she signed with Canadian club Montreal Roses FC in the Northern Super League. In December 2025, she agreed to a mutual termination of the remainder of her contract with the club.
