= Marie-Yasmine Alidou =

Canadian soccer player (born 1995)

- Alidou with the Portland Thorns in 2026

Personal information
- Full name: Marie-Yasmine Alidou d'Anjou
- Date of birth: April 28, 1995 (age 31)
- Place of birth: Montréal, Québec, Canada
- Height: 5 ft 3 in (1.60 m)
- Position: Midfielder

Team information
- Current team: Montreal Roses
- Number: 11

Youth career
- CS St-Hubert
- FC St-Leonard
- CS Union Lanaudiere Sud
- AS Varennes-St. Amable

College career
Years	Team	Apps	(Gls)
2013–2017	UQAM Citadins		

Senior career*
Years	Team	Apps	(Gls)
2017–2018	Marseille	16	(3)
2018	Linköpings FC	5	(0)
2019–2020	Sporting Huelva	19	(1)
2020–2021	Klepp	20	(5)
2022	Sturm Graz	8	(4)
2022–2023	Famalicão	20	(8)
2023–2025	Benfica	35	(10)
2025–2026	Portland Thorns	32	(1)
2026–	Montreal Roses	1	(0)

International career^{‡}
2017	Canada Universiade	5	(0)
2022–	Canada	24	(6)
- * Club domestic league appearances and goals as of July 22, 2026 ‡ National team caps and goals as of October 12, 2026

Marie-Yasmine "Mimi" Alidou d'Anjou (born April 28, 1995) is a Canadian professional soccer player who plays as a midfielder for Northern Super League club Montreal Roses FC and the Canada national team.

== Early life ==
Alidou was born in Montreal, Quebec and raised in Saint-Hubert, Quebec to a Beninese father and a French Canadian mother. She played the majority of her youth soccer with CS St-Hubert and also had stints with FC St-Leonard, Lanaudiere Sud and Varennes-St. Amable. She joined the National High Performance Centre at age 13, where she played for a year, and later moved to Newark, New Jersey to attend an American high school.

== University career ==
Alidou has attended the Université du Québec à Montréal. In 2016, she was named RSEQ Player of the Week for Week 2, UQAM Athlete of the Year, an RSEQ First Team All-Star, and a U Sports Second Team All-Star.

== Club career ==
In 2017, Alidou joined French club Olympique de Marseille.

Afterwards, she played for Swedish club Linköpings FC in 2018. A year later, she joined Sporting de Huelva in Spain. Afterwards, she played for Klepp IL in Norway in 2020–21 and Sturm Graz in 2022.

In 2022, she signed with Famalicão in Portugal in 2022. She was named the league's player of the month in February and March, and helped the club with their first Taça de Portugal.

In the summer of 2023, she signed with Benfica. On October 11, 2023, she scored a brace in a Champions League match against Cypriot club Apollon. In her first season with the club, she played a key role in Benfica's historic season, where the club won all four domestic competitions. Additionally, Alidou helped Benfica reach the quarter-finals of the UEFA Women's Champions League for the first time in the club's history, where they were eliminated by Olympique Lyon. It became the first time a Portuguese club were among the final eight teams in the competition. Alidou capped off the season as Benfica’s leading goal scorer, netting 26 goals across all competitions, including 9 in the Champions League and 6 in the Portuguese league. During her time with the club, she won six trophies including two league and cup doubles.

Alidou with Portland in September 2025

In 2025, she signed with NWSL club Portland Thorns, inking a two-year deal with a club option. She made her club debut on April 11, 2025, coming on as a second-half substitute for Caiya Hanks in a win over the Utah Royals. She scored her first NWSL goal on April 23, helping the Thorns beat NJ/NY Gotham FC, 4–1.

On July 8, 2026, it was announced that Alidou had transferred from the Thorns and signed with Northern Super League club Montreal Roses FC.

== International career ==
She represented Canada at the 2017 FISU Universiade Games.

In February 2022, she was called up to the Canada senior team for the first time. Alidou made her senior debut for Canada on February 23, 2022 against Spain at the 2022 Arnold Clark Cup. On October 21, 2024, Alidou was called up for an international friendly against Spain, the reigning World Cup champions, to replace the injured Cloe Lacasse. She subsequently scored her first international goal in the match, which ended in a 1-1 draw. On February 25, 2025, she scored a hat trick in a 7-0 victory over Chinese Taipei in the 2025 Pinatar Cup.

== Career statistics ==
=== Club ===
As of match played May 3, 2025

Appearances and goals by club, season and competition
Club	Season	League			National cup (Note: Includes Copa de la Reina, Taça de Portugal)		League cup (Note: Includes Taça da Liga)		Continental (Note: Includes UEFA Women's Champions League)		Other (Note: Includes Supertaça de Portugal)		Total	
Club	Season	Division	Apps	Goals	Apps	Goals	Apps	Goals	Apps	Goals	Apps	Goals	Apps	Goals
Marseille	2017–18	D1 Féminine	16	3	—		—		—		—		16	3
Linköping	2018	Damallsvenskan	4	0	—		—		—		—		4	0
Huelva	2019–20	Liga F	19	1	1	0	—		—		—		20	1
Klepp	2020	Toppserien	13	1	—		—		—		—		13	1
Klepp	2021	Toppserien	7	4	—		—		—		—		7	4
Klepp	Total		20	5	0	0	0	0	0	0	0	0	20	5
Sturm Graz	2021–22	ÖFB Frauen Bundesliga	8	4	—		—		—		—		8	4
Famalicão	2022–23	Campeonato Nacional Feminino	20	8	6	2	4	2	—		2	0	32	12
Benfica	2023–24	Campeonato Nacional Feminino	18	6	6	5	5	5	11	9	2	1	42	26
Benfica	2024–25	Campeonato Nacional Feminino	17	4	3	2	4	0	4	1	2	0	30	7
Benfica	Total		35	10	9	7	9	5	15	10	4	1	72	33
Portland Thorns	2025	NWSL	5	1	0	0	0	0	0	0	0	0	5	1
Career total			127	32	16	9	13	7	15	10	6	1	177	59

=== International ===
As of match played October 12, 2026

Appearances and goals by national team and year
National team	Year	Apps	Goals
Canada	2022	1	0
Canada	2023	0	0
Canada	2024	4	2
Canada	2025	12	3
Canada	2026	7	1
Total		24	6

No.	Date	Venue	Opponent	Score	Result	Competition
1.	October 25, 2024	Estadio Francisco de la Hera, Almendralejo, Spain	Spain	1–0	1–1	Friendly
2.	December 3, 2024	Pinatar Arena, San Pedro del Pinatar, Spain	South Korea	2–0	5–1	Friendly
3.	February 25, 2025	Pinatar Arena, San Pedro del Pinatar, Spain	Chinese Taipei	1–0	7–0	2025 Pinatar Cup
4.	February 25, 2025	Pinatar Arena, San Pedro del Pinatar, Spain	Chinese Taipei	2–0	7–0	2025 Pinatar Cup
5.	February 25, 2025	Pinatar Arena, San Pedro del Pinatar, Spain	Chinese Taipei	4–0	7–0	2025 Pinatar Cup
6.	June 9, 2026	Estadio Piedades de Santa Ana, Santa Ana, Costa Rica	Costa Rica	6–0	6–0	Friendly

== Honours ==
Famalicão

- Taça de Portugal: 2022–23

Benfica

- Campeonato Nacional Feminino: 2023–24, 2024–25
- Taça de Portugal: 2023–24
- Taça da Liga: 2023–24, 2024–25
- Supertaça de Portugal: 2023

Montreal Roses

- Northern Super League Supporters' Shield: 2026

Individual

- Campeonato Nacional Feminino Player of the Month: February/March 2023
