= Noémi Paquin =

Canadian soccer player (born 2001)

Personal information
- Date of birth: June 9, 2001 (age 25)
- Place of birth: Varennes, Québec, Canada
- Height: 1.55 m (5 ft 1 in)
- Position: Forward

Team information
- Current team: Montreal Roses
- Number: 7

College career
Years	Team	Apps	(Gls)
2018–2019	Cavaliers du Champlain Saint-Lambert		
2021–2024	FIU Panthers	62	(27)

Senior career*
Years	Team	Apps	(Gls)
2021–2023	AS Laval (Note: CS Monteuil changed its name to AS Laval in 2022)	17+	(3+)
2024	Miami AC	7	(3)
2025–	Montreal Roses	22	(2)
- * Club domestic league appearances and goals as of October 20, 2025

Noémi Paquin (born June 9, 2001) is a Canadian soccer player who plays for Montreal Roses FC in the Northern Super League.

== Early life ==
Paquin grew up in Varennes, Québec and began playing soccer at age four.

== College career ==
Paquin began her post-secondary career at Champlain College Saint-Lambert. In 2018, she was named the RSEQ Rookie of the Year. In September 2019, she was named the RSEQ . At the end of 2019, she was named the RSEQ Women’s Soccer Player of the Year, and was named an RSEQ All-Star and a CCAA All-Star.

In 2021, Paquin began attending Florida International University, where she played for the women's soccer team. On August 22, 2021, she scored her first goal in a match against the Jacksonville Dolphins. After leading the team in goals during her first season, she was named to the Conference USA All-Freshman Team. On September 17, 2023, she scored a brace in a 3-1 victory over the UTEP Miners. At the end of the 2023 season, she was named to the All-Conference USA First Team.

Ahead of her senior season in 2024, she was named to the Conference USA All-Preseason Team. On September 19, 2024, she scored a hat trick (with all three goals coming in seven minutes and 30 seconds) in a 4-1 victory over the Middle Tennessee Blue Raiders. Between September and October, she was named the Conference USA Offensive Player of the Week five weeks in a row, becoming the first player to ever do so. After leading the Conference USA in scoring that season, she was named the Conference USA Player of the Year, Conference USA Offensive Player of the Year, and named to the All-Conference USA First Team.

== Club career ==
In 2021, Paquin began playing with CS Monteuil (later renamed AS Laval) in the Première ligue de soccer du Québec (later renamed Ligue1 Québec).

In 2024, she played with Miami AC in the USL W League.

In January 2025, she signed her first professional contract with the Montreal Roses of the Northern Super League. On September 13, 2025, she scored her first goal, in a 5-0 victory over Calgary Wild FC.
