= Stéphanie Hill (soccer) =

Canadian soccer player (born 2001)

Personal information
- Date of birth: December 26, 2001 (age 24)
- Place of birth: Dollard-des-Ormeaux, Quebec, Canada
- Height: 6 ft 0 in (1.83 m)
- Position: Centre-back

Team information
- Current team: Montreal Roses FC
- Number: 4

College career
Years	Team	Apps	(Gls)
2021–2024	McGill Martlets	49	(1)

Senior career*
Years	Team	Apps	(Gls)
2019	CS Monteuil	10	(0)
2021–2024	Pierrefonds FC	32+	(7+)
2025–	Montreal Roses FC	19	(5)
- * Club domestic league appearances and goals as of October 20, 2025

Stéphanie Hill (born December 26, 2001) is a Canadian soccer player who plays for Montreal Roses FC in the Northern Super League.

== University career ==
Hill attended McGill University, where she played for the women's soccer team. In 2021, she was named to the RSEQ All-Rookie Team, an RESQ First Team All-Star, and the U Sports All-Rookie Team. In 2022, she was named an RSEQ Second Team All-Star. In 2023, she was named a team assistant captain. On September 10, 2023, she scored her first goal for McGill in a 2-0 victory over the Bishop's Gaiters, earning McGill Athlete of the Week honours. At the end of the 2023 season, she was again named an RSEQ First Team All-Star, as well as a U Sports First Team All-Canadian. In 2024, she was once again named an RSEQ First Team All-Star. She finished her time with McGill having played in 45 career regular season contests and four playoff games, scoring one goal and one assist.

== Club career ==
In January 2025, Hill signed with Northern Super League club Montreal Roses FC. On May 25, 2025, she scored her first goal in a 1-1 draw against Ottawa Rapid FC. At the end of the season, she was named to the league's Team of the Season.

== Career statistics ==
As of November 10, 2025

Club	Season	League			Playoffs		National Cup		League Cup		Total	
Club	Season	League	Apps	Goals	Apps	Goals	Apps	Goals	Apps	Goals	Apps	Goals
CS Monteuil	2019	Première ligue de soccer du Québec	10	0	—		—		—		10	0
Pierrefonds FC	2021	Première ligue de soccer du Québec	9	3	—		—		1	0	10	3
Pierrefonds FC	2022	Première ligue de soccer du Québec	10	3	—		—		0	0	10	3
Pierrefonds FC	2023	Ligue1 Québec	?	?	—		—		1	0	1+	0+
Pierrefonds FC	2024	Ligue1 Québec	13	1	—		—		—		13	1
Pierrefonds FC	Total		32+	7+	0	0	0	0	2	0	34+	7+
Montreal Roses FC	2025	Northern Super League	19	5	2	0	–		–		21	5
Career total			61+	12+	2	0	0	0	2	0	65+	12+
