= Chloe Minas =

Canadian soccer player (born 2002)

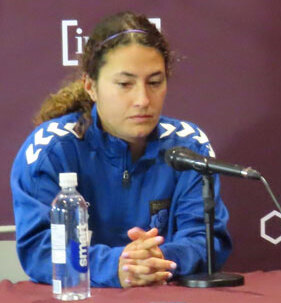
- Minas in 2025

Personal information
- Date of birth: April 12, 2002 (age 24)
- Place of birth: Montreal, Québec, Canada
- Height: 1.60 m (5 ft 3 in)
- Position: Midfielder

Team information
- Current team: Montreal Roses FC
- Number: 15

Youth career
- CS Villeray
- FS Salaberry
- CS Braves d'Ahuntsic
- Notre-Dame-de-Grâce SA
- CS Rivière-des-Prairies
- CS Monteuil

College career
Years	Team	Apps	(Gls)
2020–2024	Pittsburgh Panthers	76	(1)

Senior career*
Years	Team	Apps	(Gls)
2018–2019	CS Monteuil	5	(0)
2022	AS Laval	8	(0)
2025	Växjö DFF	7	(0)
2025–	Montreal Roses FC	7	(0)

International career
2019	Canada U20		
- * Club domestic league appearances and goals as of October 20, 2025

Chloe Minas (born April 12, 2002) is a Canadian soccer player who plays for Montreal Roses FC in the Northern Super League.

== Early life ==
Minas began playing youth soccer with CS Villeray at age six. She later played youth soccer with FS Salaberry, CS Braves d'Ahuntsic, Notre-Dame-de-Grâce SA, CS Rivière-des-Prairies, AS Laval, and the PEF Quebec program. She also played for the Team Quebec provincial team.

== College career ==
In 2020, Minas began attending the University of Pittsburgh, where she played for the women's soccer team. On September 10, 2020, she made her collegiate debut against Appalachian State Mountaineers. She missed the 2022 season due to injury. She was named to the ACC Academic Honor Roll twice in 2020 and 2022, the All-ACC Academic Team in 2023 and the Academic All-District Team in 2023 and 2024. On August 25, 2024, she scored her first collegiate goal in a 5–1 victory over the Bucknell Bison. She served as a team captain for the final four years.

== Club career ==
In 2018 and 2019, Minas played with CS Monteuil in the Première Ligue de soccer du Québec. In 2022, she returned to the side, now known as AS Laval.

In December 2024, Minas signed with Swedish club Växjö DFF in the first tier Damallsvenskan for the 2025 season.

In August 2025, Minas signed with Northern Super League club Montreal Roses FC.

== International career ==
In July 2019, Minas was called up to the Canada U20 for the first time for a training camp and friendlies in England. In July 2022, she was named to another camp with the U20s.

== Personal life ==
In conjunction with moving to Växjö DFF, Minas became a YouTuber, attracting notice in Swedish media for her video diaries documenting her time in Sweden. She had started the channel with the goal of leaving a digital footprint for her future children to see.
