= Olivia Mbala =

Canadian soccer player (born 1992)

Personal information
- Date of birth: May 12, 1992 (age 34)
- Place of birth: Toronto, Ontario, Canada
- Height: 1.75 m (5 ft 9 in)
- Position: Defender

Team information
- Current team: Montreal Roses
- Number: 24

Youth career
- Wexford SC

College career
Years	Team	Apps	(Gls)
2010	North Carolina Tar Heels	3	(1)
2012–2014	Florida Atlantic Owls	52	(4)

Senior career*
Years	Team	Apps	(Gls)
2010	Toronto Lady Lynx		
2015–2016	Grenoble Métropole Claix	14	(1)
2016–2019	Grenoble	36	(1)
2017	→ Unionville Milliken SC (loan)	1	(0)
2018	→ DeRo United FC (loan)	2	(0)
2019–2020	Rodez	8	(0)
2020–2022	Saint-Malo	23	(5)
2022–2025	Lille OSC	48	(3)
2025–	Montreal Roses FC	4	(0)
- * Club domestic league appearances and goals as of October 20, 2025

Olivia Mbala (born May 12, 1992) is a Canadian soccer player who plays for Northern Super League club Montreal Roses FC.

== Early life ==
Mbala began playing youth soccer at age five with Wexford SC. She played with Team Ontario at the 2009 Canada Summer Games.

== College career ==
In 2010, Mbala began attending the University of North Carolina at Chapel Hill, where she played for the women's soccer team. On October 21, 2010, she scored her first goal in a 5-1 victory over the Clemson Tigers.

In 2011, she transferred to Florida Atlantic University to play for the women's soccer team, but sat out the 2011 season due to NCAA transfer rules. On October 25, 2012, she scored her first goal in a 2-1 loss to the FIU Panthers. In 2013, she was named to the All-Conference USA First Team. Ahead of the 2014 season, she was named the Conference USA Preseason Defensive Player of the Year and named to the All-Preseason Team. At the end of the season, she was named the Conference USA Defensive Player of the Year and selected to the All-Conference USA First Team and All-Central Region Second Team.

== Club career ==
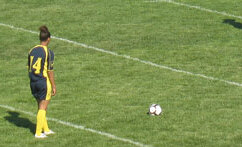
Mbala taking a free kick for the Toronto Lady Lynx in 2010

In 2010, Mbala played with the Toronto Lady Lynx in the USL W-League.

In 2015, she signed with Grenoble Métropole Claix in the French Division 2 Féminine.

In the summer of 2016, Grenoble took over Claix and she joined their squad. In July 2017, she played a single match with Unionville Milliken SC in League1 Ontario. In July 2018, she played with DeRo United FC in League1 Ontario, making two appearances. In June 2019, she departed Grenoble.

In the summer of 2019, Mbala joined Rodez in the Division 2 Féminine.

In September 2020, she signed with Saint-Malo in the Division 2 Féminine.

In June 2022, Mbala signed with Lille OSC in the Division 2 Féminine. However, shortly after signing, she suffered a knee injury delaying her debut. On November 27, 2022, she made her debut in a 7-0 victory over CA Paris 14. In July 2023, she extended her contract through June 2025. She helped the club earn promotion to the Première Ligue after her first season, but they were immediately relegated back the following year.

In July 2025, Mbala returned to Canada and signed with Northern Super League club Montreal Roses FC. She initially had discussions about joining the squad at the beginning of the season, but chose to finish out the remainder of her contract with Lille before signing. She made her debut on August 3, 2025, in a substitute appearance against Halifax Tides FC.

== International career ==
In 2010, Mbala attended a series of training camps with the Canada U18 team.

== Personal life ==
Born in Canada, Mbala is of DR Congolese descent through her father.
