= Robert Rositoiu =

Canadian soccer coach

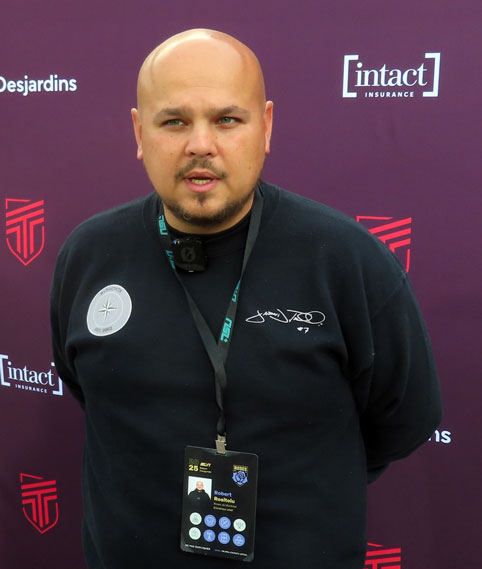
- Rositoiu in 2025

Personal information
- Place of birth: Bucharest, Romania

Managerial career
- Years: Team
- 2016–2020: CF Montreal Academy
- 2018–2020: AS Blainville (women) (assistant)
- 2021–2022: AS Blainville (women)
- 2022–2023: McGill Redbirds (assistant)
- 2023–2024: Vancouver Whitecaps Academy
- 2024–2026: Montreal Roses FC (women)

Robert Rositoiu is a Romanian-Canadian soccer coach.

== Early life ==
Rositoiu was born in Romania and moved to Canada at age 11.

== Coaching career ==
At age 24, he began coaching, helping as an assistant with a U17 girls team in Sainte-Julie.

In 2016, he joined the Montreal Impact Academy (later re-branded to the CF Montréal Academy), where he coached for five years.

In 2018, he began coaching with the AS Blainville women's team, first as an assistant, before becoming the head coach for 2021 and 2022. He won the league and cup double with the side in both seasons, as well as winning the Inter-Provincial Championship in 2022. He was named the league's Coach of the Year in 2022.

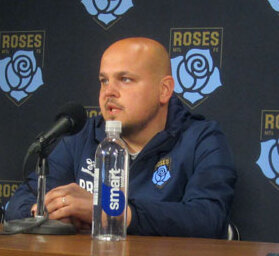
Rositoiu during a press conference in 2025

In November 2021, he became the Technical Coordinator and U15 Head Coach for Soccer Quebec.

In 2022, he became an assistant coach with the McGill University men's soccer team, where he coached for two years.

In September 2023, he briefly served as an assistant coach with the Canada U17 men's team for a training camp.

In October 2023, he joined the Vancouver Whitecaps Academy as a youth coach.

In September 2024, he was named the first head coach of Montreal Roses FC for the inaugural season of the Northern Super League in 2025. In August 2026, he was relieved of his duties as coach.
