= Gabrielle Lambert =

Canadian soccer player (born 1993)

Personal information
- Date of birth: December 27, 1993 (age 32)
- Place of birth: Saint-Hyacinthe, Quebec, Canada
- Height: 1.73 m (5 ft 8 in)
- Position: Goalkeeper

Team information
- Current team: Montreal Roses
- Number: 26

Senior career*
Years	Team	Apps	(Gls)
2016–2018	ASPTT Albi	33	(0)
2019–2021	Montpellier HSC	20	(0)
2021–2022	AS Saint-Étienne	6	(0)
2023–2024	SC Freiburg	5	(0)
2025–	Montreal Roses	8	(0)
- * Club domestic league appearances and goals as of October 20, 2025

Gabrielle Lambert (born December 27, 1993) is a Canadian soccer player who plays as goalkeeper for Northern Super League club Montreal Roses FC. She formerly played for SC Freiburg.

On October 21, 2024, Lambert was one of two players announced to have joined Montreal for their 2025 inaugural season.
