= 2018 Première ligue de soccer du Québec féminine season =

Première ligue de soccer du Québec Women's Division
- Season: 2018
- Champions: Dynamo de Québec
- Matches: 29
- Goals: 91 (3.14 per match)
- Top goalscorer: Évelyne Viens (8) (Dynamo de Québec)

The 2018 Première ligue de soccer du Québec féminine season was the first season of play for the Première ligue de soccer du Québec, a Division 3 women's soccer league in the Canadian soccer pyramid and the highest level of soccer based in the Canadian province of Québec.

== Teams ==
The following five teams took part in the inaugural season in 2018:

Team	City	Stadium	Founded	Joined	Head coach
Current teams
AS Blainville	Blainville, Laurentides	Parc Blainville	1986	2018	(Canada) Jean-Lou Gosselin
Dynamo de Quebec	Quebec City, Capitale-Nationale	ESLE	1991	2018	
FC Sélect Rive-Sud	Longueuil, Montérégie	Centre Multi Sport	2018	2018	(Canada) Marcelo Corrales et Joe Landé
CS Monteuil	Laval, Laval	Centre Sportif Bois-de-Boulogne	2018	2018	(Canada) David Cerasuolo
Lakers du Lac Saint-Louis	Dollard-des-Ormeaux, Montréal	Dollard 2	2018	2018	(Canada) Patrick Viollat

== Standings ==
Pos	Team	Pld	W	D	L	GF	GA	GD	Pts
1	Dynamo de Québec (C)	12	9	2	1	30	11	+19	29
2	CS Monteuil	12	5	2	5	14	23	−9	17
3	AS Blainville	12	4	3	5	17	16	+1	15
4	FC Sélect Rive-Sud	12	4	1	7	11	21	−10	13
5	Lakers du Lac Saint-Louis	12	3	2	7	19	20	−1	11

Source: TSI Sports
(C) Champions

=== Top scorers ===
Rank	Player	Club	Goals
1	Évelyne Viens	Dynamo de Québec	8
2	Mireille Patry	Dynamo de Québec	6
2	Mégane Sauvé	AS Blainville	6
4	Latifah Abdu	Lakers du Lac St-Louis	5
5	Jessica De Filippo	Lakers du Lac St-Louis	4
5	Marika Guay	CS Monteuil	4

=== Awards ===
Award	Player (club)	Ref
Ballon d'or (Best Player)	Sophie Thérien (CS Monteuil)	
Ballon d'argent (2nd Best Player)	Mégane Sauvé (AS Blainville)	
Ballon de bronze (3rd Best Player)	Sydney Nelson (Lakers du Lac St-Louis)	
Golden Boot (Top Scorer)	Évelyne Viens (Dynamo de Québec)	
Coach of the Year	Alfred Picariello (Dynamo de Québec)	
