= Montreal Roses FC =

Women's soccer club in Montreal, Quebec

Roses FC
- Founded: July 2023; 3 years ago
- Stadium: Stade Boréale; Laval, Quebec
- Owners: Isabèle Chevalier; Jean-François Crevier
- President: Annie Larouche, Danielle Mathews
- Sporting Director: Marinette Pichon
- Coach: Maryse Bard-Martel (interim)
- League: Northern Super League
- 2026: Regular season, 1st Playoffs, runner-up
- Website: en.rosesmtl.ca

Montreal Roses, (French: Roses de Montréal) also known simply as Roses FC, is a professional women's soccer club based in Montreal, Quebec. The club competes in the Northern Super League which is the top division in the Canadian soccer league system. Roses FC is owned by Isabèle Chevalier and Jean-François Crevier, led by Annie Larouche, and managed by Marinette Pichon. The club is symbolized by a blue rose, and its colours are black, blue, gold, red, and white.

Roses FC was founded in July 2023 by Chevalier and Crevier, who both sought involvement in the Northern Super League after its formation the previous year. In lieu of a tenancy deal with a venue in Montreal, the club played its home games at various venues. Its first season was played in 2025, with Robert Rositoiu as its head coach.

The club won its first-ever home-opener game on May 3, 2025, defeating the Ottawa Rapid 2–1 in front of a sold-out, 5,400-person Stade Boréale.

== History ==
Roses FC was co-founded by Quebecer entrepreneurs Isabèle Chevalier and Jean-François Crevier, who bought a licence for a team in the Northern Super League, then tentatively known as Project 8, in July 2023. Chevalier, who gained notoriety as a "dragon" on both the French and French-Canadian adaptations of Dragons' Den, sought a team in the league as a passion project inspired by her advocacy for women's sports; while Crevier, whose companies manufacture and distribute lubricants, sought involvement in the league after news reports covering its establishment piqued his interest. Their acquisition, along with regulatory approval by Canada Soccer, was achieved in May 2024, and the league publicly announced Roses FC and Ottawa Rapid FC as the last two of its six charter members at the espnW Summit Canada shortly after. (Note: At the time of this announcement, the clubs were known by their tentative names, SLN Montreal and NSL Ottawa.)

During the club's development, Chevalier and Crevier sought advice from former Laval Comets and Canadian national team player Amy Walsh, and former Montreal Alouettes president Patrick Boivin. They appointed former Montreal Alouettes and Montreal Alliance executive Annie Larouche as the first president of Roses FC, and former Juvisy and French national team player Marinette Pichon as its first sporting director. Larouche, who was still an executive with the Alliance when she was nominated, served out the rest of her tenure with the Alliance until the end of the 2024 CEBL season. Pichon had immigrated to Quebec in 2019, following her tenure as Juvisy's general manager, and participated in the local soccer scene prior to her appointment. Pichon appointed Robert Rositoiu, who achieved a League1 Canada treble as coach of A.S. Blainville Féminin in 2022, as Roses FC's first ever head coach. Fifteen investors were secured for the club, some of which were appointed as brand ambassadors under the title of investor-ambassadors.

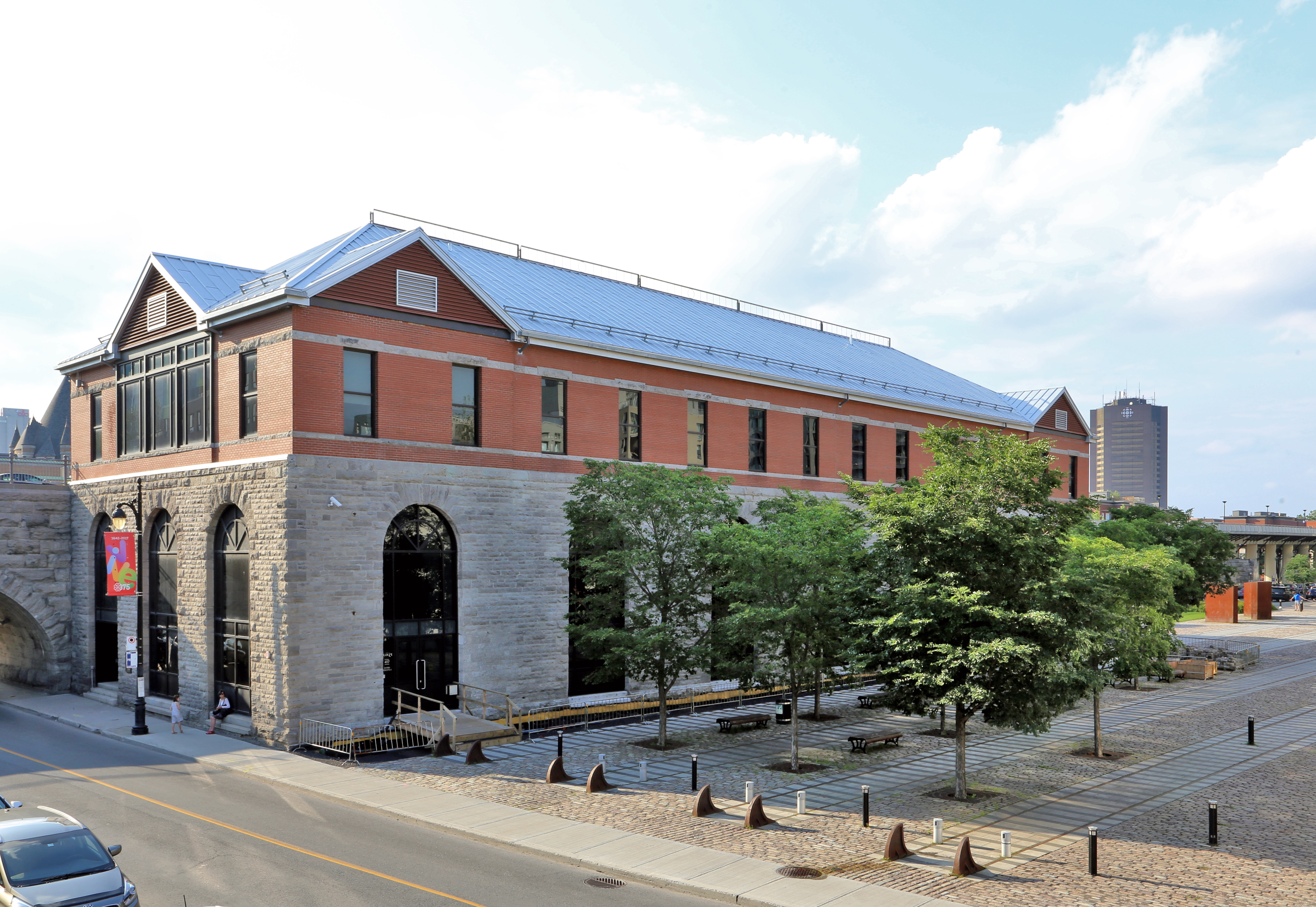
The club's launch was celebrated in an event held at Dalhousie Station (pictured).

Roses FC were the last of the six charter members of the league to unveil their branding, and did so at an event held at Dalhousie Station in Old Montreal on October 8, 2024, attended by around 550 people including Isabelle Charest, Laurent Duvernay-Tardif, members of the Montreal Victoire and Canada men's national soccer team, and various club and league executives and investors. The first player signings were announced a few weeks later – French defensive midfielder Charlotte Bilbault and Canadian goalkeeper Gabrielle Lambert, who both transferred from European clubs to join Roses FC. The club initially found difficulty in securing a long-term tenancy at a venue in Montreal, and adopted a touring model for their inaugural 2025 season, in which their home games were played in various venues.

== Identity ==
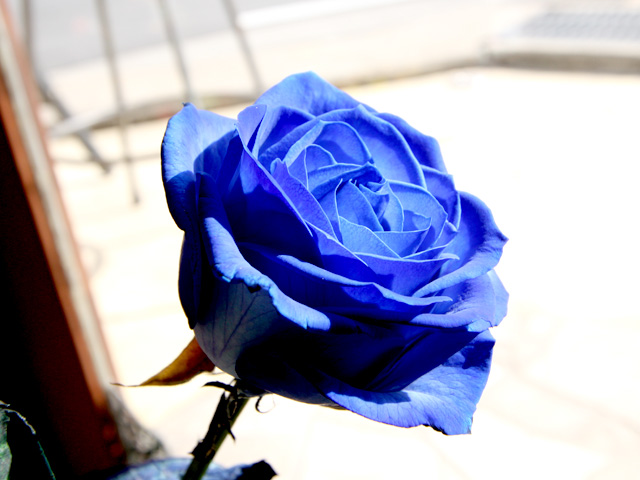
Blue roses (pictured) are prominently featured in the club's branding, intended to illustrate "making the impossible possible."

The official name of the club is Roses FC, though Montreal Roses and Roses de Montréal are also used by the club in English- and French-language media, respectively. Roses were chosen as the central motif in the club's identity for their bilingual name, and recognition as symbols of femininity and of Montreal itself – being featured in the city's coat of arms, flag, and logo. The club's branding was workshopped with Quebec-based advertising agencies Cossette and GRDN from over forty ideas. It primarily uses hues of blue and red, symbolizing the "diverse cultural heritage shared between Quebec and Canada," that intentionally differ from blue and red hues traditionally used by Montreal sports teams. Black, gold, and white are also used in the club's colours. A blue rose, which does not occur naturally, features prominently on the club's crest – intended to evoke perseverance, resilience, and the idea of "[making] the impossible possible." The typography used in the club's branding, inspired by the Farine Five Roses sign, was designed to resemble thorns on the stems of roses.

== Stadium ==
Roses FC initially planned to have no permanent home ground, and to play their home games at various venues. Its training ground is the Centre Sportif Bois-de-Boulogne in Laval, Quebec, which will undertake two rounds of renovations to accommodate the club. In January 2025, it was announced that a modular stadium, later to be named Stade Boréale, would be built on the same land as their training ground to have a single home for their debut season.

== Organization ==
Roses FC are independently owned by Isabèle Chevalier and Jean-François Crevier. It is led by Annie Larouche as its president, while Marinette Pichon manages the club as its sporting director. The club's board of directors also includes Mélissa Beauchesne in the operations portfolio, Antoine Chevalier in ticketing, Andréanne Gagné in culture and finance, Baptiste Robert in partnerships, and Nathalie Vachon in strategy and communications. A number of investors hold shares in the club, some of which also serve as brand ambassadors for the club under the title of investor-ambassadors (French: investisseur-ambassadeurs). Notable investors include LCI Education, Patrice Bernier, Maxime Crépeau, Julie du Page, Mark Pathy, Samuel Piette, and Bruny Surin.

== Honours ==
Montreal Roses FC honours
Type	Competition	Titles	Seasons
Domestic	Regular season	1	2026

== Players and staff ==
=== Current squad ===
As of July 8, 2026

Note: Flags indicate national team as defined under FIFA eligibility rules; some limited exceptions apply. Players may hold more than one non-FIFA nationality. Squad correct as of April 17, 2025.

No.	Pos.	Nation	Player
1	GK	CAN	Anna Karpenko
2	DF	USA	Lucy Cappadona
3	DF	USA	Hailey Whitaker
4	DF	CAN	Stephanie Hill
5	DF	USA	Julia Leas
7	FW	CAN	Noémi Paquin
8	MF	CAN	Mara Bouchard
9	FW	USA	Elyse Bennett
10	MF	CAN	Lisa Pechersky
11	MF	CAN	Marie-Yasmine Alidou
12	FW	UKR	Tanya Boychuk (captain)
13	MF	GHA	Evelyn Badu

No.	Pos.	Nation	Player
14	FW	CAN	Claire Monyard
15	MF	CAN	Chloe Minas
17	FW	KOR	Choi Han-bin
18	MF	FRA	Charlotte Bilbault
19	MF	CAN	Lorie Thibault
20	DF	CAN	Mégane Sauvé (captain)
21	FW	CAN	Marilou Harvey
22	GK	CAN	Anne-Marie Laroche
23	MF	CAN	Félicia Roy
24	DF	CAN	Olivia Mbala
26	GK	CAN	Gabrielle Lambert
27	DF	FRA	Ève Périsset

Counts as a domestic player as she also holds Canadian nationality

=== Coaching staff ===
As of November 23, 2024

Position	Name
Head Coach	Maryse Bard-Martel
Assistant coaches	Francisco Vela
Assistant coaches	Antoine Guldner
Goalkeeping coach	Maryse Bard-Martel
Performance coach	Yannick Girard
Mental coach	Antoine Guldner
Head of Performance Culture	Antoine Guldner
Sporting Director	Marinette Pichon

=== Administration ===
As of November 23, 2024

Position	Name
President	Annie Larouche
Vice President, Strategies and Communications	Nathalie Vachon
Director, Events and Community	Sidney Ginchereau
Director, Culture and Finance	Andréanne Gagné
Director, Operations	Mélissa Beauchesne
Director, Partnerships	Baptiste Robert
Box Office Director	Antoine Chevalier
Marketing and Communications Manager	Cynthia Cianciusi
Assistant, Sporting Management	Mateo Cabanettes
Content and Digital Platforms Manager	Patrick Lacson

== Managers ==
As of April 4, 2026:

Name	Tenure	Refs
(Romania) / (Canada) Robert Rositoiu	September 11, 2024 – August 13, 2026	
(Canada) Maryse Bard-Martel	August 13, 2026 – present	

== See also ==
- List of professional sports teams in the United States and Canada
- List of soccer clubs in Canada
- CF Montréal Academy
