= 2026 Halifax Tides FC season =

Halifax Tides FC
2026 season
- CEO: Courtney Sherlock
- Head coach: Stephen Hart
- Stadium: Wanderers Grounds; Halifax, Nova Scotia

The 2026 Halifax Tides FC season is the second in the club's history, as well as the second season in Northern Super League history.

== Summary ==
In December 2025, Stephen Hart was confirmed as head coach after his interim role. Ruth Fahy was also announced as the club's vice president of football.

On 16 February 2026, Halifax Tides opened its training camp, and announced new backroom staff for the club.

On 27 August 2026, Halifax Tides announced the departure of sporting director Amit Batra.

== Team ==
=== Coaching staff ===
Position	Name
Head coach	Stephen Hart
Assistant coach	Kennedi Herrman; Katie Barrott

=== Roster ===
As of April 23, 2026.

No.	Nat.	Name	Date of birth (age)	Since	Previous club	Notes
Goalkeepers
12	(Slovakia)	Anika Tóth	January 15, 2002 (aged 24)	2025	(Canada) Woodbridge Strikers	
13	(Canada)	Samantha St.Croix	November 21, 2002 (aged 23)	2026		
17	(Canada)	Kirstin Tynan	March 11, 2002 (aged 24)	2026	(Canada) Vancouver Rise FC (loan)	
Defenders
2	(Jamaica)	Naya Cardoza	November 2, 2004 (aged 21)	2026	(Canada) Pickering FC	
3	(United States)	Sheyenne Allen	April 26, 2001 (aged 24)	2026	(United States) Fort Lauderdale United FC	INT
5	(Canada)	Annika Leslie	April 22, 2003 (aged 22)	2025	(United States) West Virginia Mountaineers	
7	(Norway)	Julie Pedersen	January 4, 1999 (aged 27)	2026	(Norway) Odds BK	INT
16	(United States)	Addison Weichers	January 15, 2002 (aged 24)	2025	(United States) Utah State Aggies	
28	(France)	Éva Frémaux	March 28, 2002 (aged 24)	2025	(France) Nantes	INT
44	(Canada)	Julianne Vallerand	August 9, 2001 (aged 24)	2025	(United States) Spokane Zephyr FC	
Midfielders
4	(Canada)	Julia Benati	July 18, 1996 (aged 29)	2026	(Canada) Ottawa Rapid FC	
6	(Canada)	Karima Lemire	October 19, 1998 (aged 27)	2025	(Portugal) Clube de Albergaria	
8	(South Korea)	Cho So-hyun	June 24, 1988 (aged 37)	2026	(South Korea) Suwon FC Women	INT
10	(United States)	Katherine Jordan	February 25, 2002 (aged 24)	2026	(United States)	
14	(Canada)	Sarah Taylor	December 6, 1996 (aged 29)	2025	–	
21	(Norway)	Synne Moe	October 20, 2002 (aged 23)	2026	(Norway) FK Bodø/Glimt	INT
22	(Canada)	Megan Chiason		2026	(Canada) Dalhousie University	
24	(Japan)	Megumi Nakamura	August 24, 2000 (aged 25)	2025	(Japan) AC Nagano Parceiro	INT
Forwards
9	(United States)	Meredith McDermott		2026	(United States) University of Virginia	INT
11	(Canada)	Saorla Miller	August 18, 2001 (aged 24)	2025	(Iceland) Keflavík	
30	(United States)	Jordyn Rhodes	July 12, 2000 (aged 25)	2026	(Iceland) Valur	INT
32	(Canada)	Sydney Kennedy	March 2, 2001 (aged 25)	2025	(Canada) Acadia Axewomen	
33	(Jamaica)	Tiffany Cameron	October 16, 1991 (aged 34)	2025	(Spain) Real Betis	
98	(Canada)	Stella Downing	December 6, 2002 (aged 23)	2026	(Canada) Ottawa Rapid FC	
Left during the season
1	(Canada)	Rylee Foster	August 13, 1998 (aged 27)	2026	(United States) Dallas Trinity FC	

== Competitions ==
=== Northern Super League ===
==== Table ====
Pos	Team	Pld	W	D	L	GF	GA	GD	Pts	Playoff qualification
1	Montreal Roses (S)	25	12	9	4	43	27	+16	45	Advance to playoffs
2	Ottawa Rapid	25	12	4	9	49	44	+5	40	Advance to playoffs
3	AFC Toronto	25	10	9	6	38	24	+14	39	Advance to playoffs
4	Vancouver Rise	25	9	4	12	47	55	−8	31	Advance to playoffs
5	Halifax Tides	25	7	8	10	24	24	0	29	
6	Calgary Wild	25	5	6	14	28	55	−27	21	

Source: NSL
Rules for classification: 1) Points 2) Head-to-head points; 3) Head-to-head goal difference; 4) Goal difference; 5) Wins; 6) Goals scored; 7) Goals conceded; 8) Least red cards; 9) Least yellow cards; 10) Drawing of lots.
(S) Supporters' Shield winner

==== Matches ====
===== April and May =====
April 25, 2026 1	Halifax Tides	3–1	Ottawa Rapid FC	Halifax, Nova Scotia
	Weichers 38'; Rhodes 78'; Vallerand 84'	Report	Golen 80'; Choo (yellow card) 86'	Stadium: Wanderers Grounds; Referee: Myriam Marcotte

May 3, 2026 2	AFC Toronto	0–0	Halifax Tides	Toronto, Ontario
		Report	Cardoza (yellow card) 45'	Stadium: BMO Field; Attendance: 6,476; Referee: Shelia Couture

May 13, 2026 3	Ottawa Rapid	2–0	Halifax Tides FC	Ottawa, Ontario
	Waite 35'; Choo 77'; Golen (yellow card) 85'	Report	Allen (yellow card) 63'; Vallerand (yellow card) 75'	Stadium: TD Place Stadium; Referee: Anne-Marie Canuel

May 18, 2026 4	Halifax Tides	1–2	Vancouver Rise FC	Halifax, Nova Scotia
14:00 PT	Rhodes 57'		Tumeth (yellow card) 16'; De Filippo 37', (yellow card) 60'; Quinn 59' (pen.)	Stadium: Wanderers Grounds; Attendance: 3,434; Referee: Isabelle Duclos

May 24, 2026 5	Calgary Wild FC	0–4	Halifax Tides	Calgary, Alberta
	Talbert (yellow card) 54'	Report	Miller 7', 25'; Vallerand 22', 78'	Stadium: McMahon Stadium; Attendance: 2,847; Referee: Angelina Baldino

May 29, 2026 6	Halifax Tides	1–2	Ottawa Rapid FC	Halifax, Nova Scotia
	Benati 70'; Allen (yellow card) 90+4'	Report	Harris 38'; Pridham 88'	Stadium: Wanderers Grounds; Referee: Yusri Rudolf

===== June =====
June 13, 2026 7	Halifax Tides	2–0	Calgary Wild FC	Halifax, Nova Scotia
	Benati 29'; Moe (yellow card) 36' (red card) 48'; Miller 44'		O'Neill (yellow card) 37'; Robertson (yellow card) 61'; Stordy (yellow card) 90+1'	Stadium: Wanderers Grounds; Attendance: 3,735; Referee: Carly Shaw-Maclaren

June 18, 2026 8	Halifax Tides	1–1	Vancouver Rise	Halifax, Nova Scotia
07:00 PT	Vallerand 89'	Report	Oularbi 58'	Stadium: Wanderers Grounds; Attendance: 5,516; Referee: Ben Hoskins

June 27, 2026 8	Calgary Wild	0–1	Halifax Tides FC	Calgary, Alberta
		Report	Miller 81'; Weichers (yellow card) 90+4'	Stadium: McMahon Stadium; Referee: Alain Ruch

===== July =====
July 5, 2026 10	Halifax Tides	0–1	AFC Toronto	Halifax, Nova Scotia
		Report	Hunter 12' (yellow card) 85'; Small (yellow card) 71'; Owusu Ansah (yellow card) 90+1'	Stadium: Wanderers Grounds; Referee: Salma Flores-Desrochers

July 12, 2026 11	Montreal Roses	1–0	Halifax Tides FC	Laval, Quebec
16:00 EDT	Badu (yellow card) 26'; Minas 77'	Report	Benati (yellow card) 34'; Cameron (yellow card) 83'	Stadium: Stade Boréale; Referee: Isabelle Duclos

July 16, 2026 12	Ottawa Rapid FC	2–1	Halifax Tides	Ottawa, Ontario
	Baie Pridham 41'; Waite 55'; Lee (yellow card) 66'; Wilkinson (yellow card) 90+4'	Report	Cho 59'	Stadium: TD Place Stadium; Referee: Myriam Marcotte

July 25, 2026 13	Vancouver Rise	0–1	Halifax Tides	Burnaby, British Columbia
		Report	De Filippo 53' (o.g.); Lemire (yellow card) 63'	Stadium: Swangard Stadium; Referee: Iwan-Nikita Jecanski

===== August =====
August 3, 2026 14 (Note: This game doubled as a quarter-final match in the 2026–27 W Canadian Championship and counted in both competitions; this game counted as a 2–2 draw in the NSL standings and a 2–3 loss in the W Canadian Championship.)	Halifax Tides	2–3 (a.e.t.)	Ottawa Rapid FC	Halifax, Nova Scotia
3:00 pm ADT	Rhodes 49', 62'	Report	Belzile 83'; Wilkinson 90+2'; Golen 107'	Stadium: Wanderers Grounds; Attendance: 3,682; Referee: Myriam Marcotte

August 7, 2026 15	Montreal Roses	0–1	Halifax Tides FC	Laval, Quebec
19:00 EDT (UTC-04:00)	Lucy Cappadona (yellow card) 53'	Report	Bentani 45'; Leslie (yellow card) 49'; McDermot (yellow card) 74'; Benati (yellow card) 89'	Stadium: Stade Boréale; Attendance: 2,374; Referee: Roberto D'Alesio

August 15, 2026 16	Vancouver Rise	2–1	Halifax Tides	Burnaby, British Columbia
18:30 PT	López (yellow card) 24'; François (yellow card) 45'; De Filippo 56', 90+4'	Report	Rhodes 18'; Lemire (yellow card) 62'	Stadium: Swangard Stadium; Attendance: 2,674; Referee: Carly Shaw-MacLaren

August 23, 2026 17	Halifax Tides	0–2	AFC Toronto	Halifax, Nova Scotia
	Weichers (yellow card) 30'	Report	Small 20'; Hunter 32'	Stadium: Wanderers Grounds; Attendance: 3,368; Referee: Sheila Couture

August 29, 2026 18	Montreal Roses	1–0	Halifax Tides FC	Montreal, Quebec
14:00 EDT (UTC-04:00)	Sauvé (yellow card) 66'; Seto 76'	Report	Vallerand (yellow card) 54'; Allen (yellow card) 68' (yellow-red card) 68'	Stadium: Stade Saputo; Attendance: 17,077; Referee: Alain Ruch

===== September =====
September 5, 2026 19	Vancouver Rise	0–1	Halifax Tides	Burnaby, British Columbia
16:00 PT	Lamontagne (yellow card) 37'; Oularbi (yellow card) 84'	Report	Lemire (yellow card) 22'; Cho (yellow card) 37'; Jordan (yellow card) 39'; Vallerand (yellow card) 78'; Benati 90+5'	Stadium: Swangard Stadium; Referee: Isabelle Duclos

September 12, 2026 20	Calgary Wild	1–0	Halifax Tides FC	Calgary, Alberta
	Stewart 48'; Otto (yellow card) 58'; Baucom (yellow card) 90+1'	Report	Weichers (yellow card) 24'	Stadium: McMahon Stadium; Referee: Anne-Marie Canuel

September 19, 2026 21	Halifax Tides	1–1	AFC Toronto	Halifax, Nova Scotia
	Vallerand 59'	Report	Tóth 1' (o.g.)	Stadium: Wanderers Grounds; Referee: Salma Flores-Desrochers

September 27, 2026 22	Halifax Tides	0–0	Montreal Roses FC	Halifax, Nova Scotia
	Weichers (yellow card) 72'	Report	Badu (yellow card) 90+3'	Stadium: Wanderers Grounds; Attendance: 3,721; Referee: Renzo Villanueva

===== October =====
October 3, 2026 23	Halifax Tides	0–0	Calgary Wild FC	Halifax, Nova Scotia
2:00 PM		Report	Johnson (yellow card) 54'; Baucom (yellow card) 70'; Jones (yellow card) 75'; Pogarch (yellow card) 90+2'	Stadium: Wanderers Grounds; Attendance: 3,903; Referee: Isabelle Duclos

October 17, 2026 24	Halifax Tides	2–2	Montreal Roses FC	Halifax, Nova Scotia
	Vallerand (yellow card) 25'; Rhodes 70'; Allen (yellow card) 73'; Cameron 86'	Report	Cappadonna 27'; Alidou 45+1'	Stadium: Wanderers Grounds; Referee: Mario Alayass

October 26, 2026 25	AFC Toronto	1–1	Halifax Tides	Toronto, Ontario
7:00 PM EDT	28' Hunter	Report	44' Miller	Stadium: BMO Field; Referee: Salma Flores-Desrochers

== Statistics ==
No.	Pos	Nat	Player	Total		NSL	
No.	Pos	Nat	Player	Apps	Goals	Apps	Goals
Goalkeepers
1	GK	(Canada) CAN	Rylee Foster	0	0	0	0
12	GK	(Slovakia) SVK	Anika Tóth	0	0	0	0
13	GK	(Canada) CAN	Samantha St.Croix	0	0	0	0
Defenders
2	DF	(Jamaica) JAM	Naya Cardoza	0	0	0	0
3	DF	(United States) USA	Sheyenne Allen	0	0	0	0
5	DF	(Canada) CAN	Annika Leslie	0	0	0	0
7	DF	(Norway) NOR	Julie Pedersen	0	0	0	0
16	DF	(United States) USA	Addison Weichers	0	0	0	0
28	DF	(France) FRA	Éva Frémaux	0	0	0	0
44	DF	(Canada) CAN	Julianne Vallerand	0	0	0	0
Midfielders
4	MF	(Canada) CAN	Julia Benati	0	0	0	0
6	MF	(Canada) CAN	Karima Lemire	0	0	0	0
8	MF	(South Korea) KOR	Cho So-hyun	0	0	0	0
10	MF	(United States) USA	Katherine Jordan	0	0	0	0
14	MF	(Canada) CAN	Sarah Taylor	0	0	0	0
21	MF	(Norway) NOR	Synne Moe	0	0	0	0
24	MF	(Japan) JPN	Megumi Nakamura	0	0	0	0
Forwards
11	MF	(Canada) CAN	Saorla Miller	0	0	0	0
30	MF	(Canada) CAN	Jordyn Rhodes	0	0	0	0
32	MF	(Canada) CAN	Sydney Kennedy	0	0	0	0
33	FW	(Jamaica) JAM	Tiffany Cameron	0	0	0	0
98	FW	(Canada) CAN	Stella Downing	0	0	0	0

Source: Competitions

== Transactions ==
=== Contract operations ===
Date	Player	Pos.	Notes	Ref.
18 November 2025	(Japan) Megumi Nakamura	MF	Contract extension through the 2026 season	
8 December 2025	(United States) Addison Weichers	DF	Contract extension through the 2026 season	
16 December 2025	(Canada) Julianne Vallerand	DF	Contract extension through the 2026 season	
20 December 2025	(Canada) Karima Lemire	MF	Contract extension through the 2026 season	
5 January 2026	(Canada) Saorla Miller	FW	Contract extension through the 2026 season	
4 February 2026	(Canada) Sarah Taylor	MF	Contract extension through the 2026 season	

=== Transfers in ===
No.	Pos.	Player	From club	Fee/notes	Date	Source
98	FW	(Canada) Stella Downing	(Canada) Ottawa Rapid FC	Transfer	12 December 2025	
4	MF	(Canada) Julia Benati	(Canada) Ottawa Rapid FC	Transfer	14 January 2026	
21	MF	(Norway) Synne Moe	(Norway) FK Bodø/Glimt Kvinner	Transfer	16 January 2026	
3	DF	(United States) Sheyenne Allen	(United States) Fort Lauderdale United FC	Transfer	21 January 2026	
30	FW	(United States) Jordyn Rhodes	(Iceland) Valur	Transfer	23 January 2026	
1	GK	(Canada) Rylee Foster		Free agent	27 January 2026	
13	GK	(Canada) Samantha St. Croix		Transfer	29 January 2026	
7	DF	(Norway) Julie Pedersen	(Norway) Odds BK	Transfer	6 February 2026	
8	MF	(South Korea) Cho So-hyun	(South Korea) Suwon FC	Free agent	11 February 2026	
2	DF	(Jamaica) Naya Cardoza	(Canada) Pickering FC	Free agent	12 February 2026	
10	MF	(United States) Katherine Jordan		Free agent	13 February 2026	
9	FW	(United States) Meredith McDermott			28 July 2026	
22	MF	(Canada) Megan Chiason			1 September 2026	

=== Transfers out ===
No.	Pos.	Player	To club	Fee/notes	Date	Source
1	GK	(Canada) Rylee Foster-Inman	(England) Everton		12 August 2026	
