= 2026 Northern Super League season =

Women's professional soccer league season

Northern Super League
- Season: 2026
- Dates: April 24 – October 26 (regular season); October 31 – November 14 (play-offs)
- Champions: AFC Toronto
- Supporters' Shield: Montreal Roses
- Matches: 75
- Goals: 229 (3.05 per match)
- Best player: Jessica De Filippo
- Top goalscorer: Jessica De Filippo (13 goals)
- Biggest home win: Montreal Roses 4–0 Vancouver Rise (May 2); Ottawa Rapid 4–0 Vancouver Rise (May 6); Montreal Roses 5–1 Vancouver Rise (July 4); Vancouver Rise 4–0 Ottawa Rapid (September 13)
- Biggest away win: Calgary Wild 0–6 AFC Toronto (August 1)
- Highest scoring: Ottawa Rapid 5–2 Calgary Wild (May 2); Calgary Wild 4–3 Ottawa Rapid (August 15); Ottawa Rapid 5–2 Vancouver Rise (October 18)
- Longest winning run: 5 matches Ottawa Rapid (June 25 – July 22)
- Longest unbeaten run: 10 matches Ottawa Rapid (May 29 – August 9)
- Longest winless run: 14 matches Calgary Wild (April 25 – August 1)
- Longest losing run: 7 matches Calgary Wild (June 27 – August 1)
- Highest attendance: 17,077; Montreal Roses 1–0 Halifax Tides (August 29)
- Lowest attendance: 1,295; Ottawa Rapid 2–0 Halifax Tides (May 13)
- Total attendance: 241,430
- Average attendance: 3,353
- All statistics correct as of October 26, 2026.

The 2026 Northern Super League season was the second season of the Northern Super League, the top level of women's Canadian soccer. The season started on April 24 and concluded with the final on November 14.

Montreal Roses FC clinched the Supporters' Shield in their final match of the regular season. AFC Toronto won the championship by defeating Montreal 1–0 in the final.

== Teams ==
Six clubs participated in the season.

=== Stadiums and locations ===
Location of the 2026 Northern Super League teams

Team	Results	Location	Stadium	Capacity
Calgary Wild FC	details	Calgary, Alberta	McMahon Stadium	35,400
Halifax Tides FC	details	Halifax, Nova Scotia	Wanderers Grounds	7,500
Montreal Roses FC	details	Laval, Quebec	Centre Sportif Bois-de-Boulogne	5,581
Ottawa Rapid FC	details	Ottawa, Ontario	TD Place Stadium	24,000
AFC Toronto	details	Toronto, Ontario	York Lions Stadium	4,000
AFC Toronto	details	Toronto, Ontario	BMO Field	30,000
Vancouver Rise FC	details	Burnaby, British Columbia	Swangard Stadium	4,500

=== Personnel and sponsorship ===
Team	Head coach	Captain	Kit manufacturer	Shirt sponsor
Calgary Wild	(Australia) Leah Blayney	(United States) Meggie Dougherty Howard	Hummel	National Bank of Canada
Halifax Tides	(Trinidad and Tobago) Stephen Hart	(Canada) Sydney Kennedy, (Canada) Saorla Miller	Hummel	Desjardins
Montreal Roses	(Romania) Robert Rositoiu	(Ukraine) Tanya Boychuk, (Canada) Megane Sauve	Hummel	Desjardins
Ottawa Rapid	(Denmark) Katrine Pedersen	(Canada) Olivia Scott	Hummel	National Bank of Canada
AFC Toronto	(Canada) Marko Milanović	(Jamaica) Nikayla Small	Hummel	Desjardins
Vancouver Rise	(Denmark) Anja Heiner-Møller	(Canada) Shannon Woeller, (Canada) Quinn	Hummel	National Bank of Canada

=== Coaching changes ===
Team	Outgoing coach	Manner of departure	Date of vacancy	Position in table	Incoming coach	Date of appointment
Calgary Wild FC	(England) Lydia Bedford	Left to coach England women's U-23 team	March 9, 2026	Pre-season	(England) Sinead McSharry	March 9, 2026
Calgary Wild FC	(England) Sinead McSharry	Interim spell over	July 6, 2026	6th	(Australia) Leah Blayney	July 6, 2026
Montreal Roses FC	(Romania) Robert Rositoiu	Fired	August 2026	2nd	(Canada) Maryse Bard-Martel	August 2026
Vancouver Rise FC	(Denmark) Anja Heiner-Møller	Parted ways	September 7, 2026	5th	(Wales) Iain Darbyshire	September 7, 2026

== Regular season ==
=== Format ===
Each club played 25 matches during the season, playing each other club five times. The regular season winner, Montreal Roses FC, were awarded the Supporters' Shield. The top four clubs advanced to the two-legged semifinals, with the winners advancing to a single championship match.

=== Standings ===
Pos	Team	Pld	W	D	L	GF	GA	GD	Pts	Playoff qualification
1	Montreal Roses (S)	25	12	9	4	43	27	+16	45	Advance to play-offs
2	Ottawa Rapid	25	12	4	9	49	44	+5	40	Advance to play-offs
3	AFC Toronto	25	10	9	6	38	24	+14	39	Advance to play-offs
4	Vancouver Rise	25	9	4	12	47	55	−8	31	Advance to play-offs
5	Halifax Tides	25	7	8	10	24	24	0	29	
6	Calgary Wild	25	5	6	14	28	55	−27	21	

Source: NSL
Rules for classification: 1) Points 2) Head-to-head points; 3) Head-to-head goal difference; 4) Goal difference; 5) Wins; 6) Goals scored; 7) Goals conceded; 8) Least red cards; 9) Least yellow cards; 10) Drawing of lots.
(S) Supporters' Shield winner

=== Results ===
Home \ Away	CGY	HFX	MTL	OTT	TOR	VAN
Calgary Wild		0–4	0–2	1–2	0–4	2–4
Calgary Wild		0–1	2–2	4–3	0–6	3–1
Calgary Wild		1–0	0–2			
Halifax Tides	2–0		0–0	3–1	0–1	1–2
Halifax Tides	0–0		2–2	1–2	0–2	1–1
Halifax Tides				2–2 (Note: Match was continued to a 2–3 scoreline in extra time, as the match also counted as a quarter-final match for the 2026–27 W Canadian Championship. However, only the 2–2 result at the end of full time counted toward season standings.)	1–1	
Montreal Roses	1–1	1–0		1–2	0–2	4–0
Montreal Roses	2–2	0–1		0–0	2–2	2–3
Montreal Roses		1–0		1–0		5–1
Ottawa Rapid	5–2	2–0	1–2		1–1	4–0
Ottawa Rapid	3–1	2–1	2–3		2–2	1–5
Ottawa Rapid	3–1					5–2
AFC Toronto	1–0	0–0	0–1	1–2		0–3
AFC Toronto	0–0	1–1	1–1	2–1		1–1 (Note: Match was continued to a 2–1 scoreline in extra time, as the match also counted as a quarter-final match for the 2026–27 W Canadian Championship. However, only the 1–1 result at the end of full time counted toward season standings.)
AFC Toronto	0–1		0–2	3–0		
Vancouver Rise	2–3	0–1	3–4	1–3	2–3	
Vancouver Rise	2–2	2–1	2–2	4–0	2–1	
Vancouver Rise	3–2	0–1			1–3	

Source: NSL
Legend: Blue = home team win; Yellow = draw; Red = away team win.

=== Positions by week ===
Team ╲ Week	1	2	3	4	5	6	8	9	10	11	12	13	14	15	16	17	18	19	20	21	22	23	24	26	27
Calgary Wild	6	5	5	6	6	6	6	6	6	6	6	6	6	6	6	6	6	6	6	6	6	6	6	6	6
Halifax Tides	1	2	3	4	3	5	3	3	3	4	4	5	4	4	4	4	5	5	4	5	5	5	5	4	5
Montreal Roses	2	1	1	1	1	1	2	2	2	2	2	2	2	2	2	2	2	1	1	1	1	1	1	1	1
Ottawa Rapid	5	4	2	2	2	2	1	1	1	1	1	1	1	1	1	1	1	2	2	3	2	3	3	2	2
AFC Toronto	3	3	4	3	5	4	5	5	4	3	3	4	3	3	3	3	3	3	3	2	3	2	2	3	3
Vancouver Rise	4	6	6	5	4	3	4	4	5	5	5	3	5	5	5	5	4	4	5	4	4	4	4	5	4

Source: NSL standings, NSL on Instagram
= Play-offs

== Play-offs ==
For the semi-finals, the first legs were played on October 31 and November 1, and the second legs were played on November 7 and 8. The final was played on November 14 at the predetermined site of TD Place Stadium in Ottawa.

In the play-offs, if the aggregate scores were equal at the end of normal time of the second match, or end of the single match for the final, two 15-minute periods of extra time were played with each team allowed an extra substitution. If still tied, the winner is decided by a penalty shoot-out.

=== Bracket ===
Semi-finals two-legged tie
1	Montreal Roses	3	2	5
4	Vancouver Rise	0	2	2
2	Ottawa Rapid	2	0	2
3	AFC Toronto	4	4	8

Final single match
November 14 – Ottawa
1	Montreal Roses	0
3	AFC Toronto	1

=== Semi-finals ===
Team 1	Agg.	Team 2	1st leg	2nd leg
Ottawa Rapid	2–8	AFC Toronto	2–4	0–4
Vancouver Rise	2–5	Montreal Roses	0–3	2–2

October 31
2:00 pm EDT

AFC Toronto	4–2	Ottawa Rapid
Lantaigne 11'; Hunter 25', 66'; Silano 54'	Report	Choo 58'; Melenhorst 90'

York Lions Stadium, Toronto, Ontario
Attendance: 2,270
Referee: Scott Bowman
November 7
2:00 pm EST

Ottawa Rapid	0–4	AFC Toronto
	Report	Hunter 6', 29'; Silano 44'; Small 52'

TD Place Stadium, Ottawa, Ontario
Attendance: 2,448
Referee: Alain Ruch

AFC Toronto won 8–2 on aggregate.

November 1
5:00 pm PCT

Vancouver Rise	0–3	Montreal Roses
	Report	Bennett 11'; Alidou 30'; Pechersky 72'

Swangard Stadium, Burnaby, British Columbia
Attendance: 1,672
Referee: Isabelle Duclos
November 8
4:00 pm EST

Montreal Roses	2–2	Vancouver Rise
Paquin 39'; Pechersky 77'	Report	De Filippo 41'; Abdu 45+2'

Stade Boréal, Laval, Quebec
Attendance: 2,834
Referee: Myriam Marcotte

Montreal Roses won 5–2 on aggregate.

=== Final ===
November 14
2:00 pm EST

Montreal Roses	0–1	AFC Toronto
	Report	Chisholm 39'

TD Place Stadium, Ottawa, Ontario
Referee: Carly Shaw-MacLaren

== Statistical leaders ==
All stats are for the regular season only, and do not include play-offs.

As of October 26, 2026.

=== Top scorers ===
Rank	Nat	Player	Team	Total
1	(Canada)	Jessica De Filippo	Vancouver Rise	13
2	(United States)	Elyse Bennett	Montreal Roses	11
2	(Canada)	Kaylee Hunter	AFC Toronto	11
4	(Canada)	Delaney Baie Pridham	Ottawa Rapid	10
5	(Canada)	Lauren Rowe	AFC Toronto	8
6	(United States)	Jorian Baucom	Calgary Wild	7
7	(Canada)	Latifah Abdu	Vancouver Rise	6
7	(Ukraine)	Tanya Boychuk	Montreal Roses	6
7	(Canada)	Keera Melenhorst	Ottawa Rapid	6
7	(United States)	Jordyn Rhodes	Halifax Tides	6

=== Hat-tricks ===
Player	For	Against	Result	Date	Ref
(Ghana) Evelyn Badu	Montreal Roses	Vancouver Rise	5–1 (H)	July 4	

=== Top assists ===
Rank	Nat	Player	Team	Total
1	(Canada)	Keera Melenhorst	Ottawa Rapid	7
2	(Canada)	Florence Belzile	Ottawa Rapid	5
2	(Canada)	Anna Bout	Vancouver Rise	5
2	(Canada)	Delaney Baie Pridham	Ottawa Rapid	5
2	(Canada)	María Camila Reyes	Vancouver Rise	5
6	(Canada)	Jessica De Filippo	Vancouver Rise	4
6	(Norway)	Johanne Fridlund	Ottawa Rapid	4
6	(Canada)	Lisa Pechersky	Montreal Roses	4
9	(Canada)	Latifah Abdu	Vancouver Rise	3
9	(United States)	Josie Aulicino	Calgary Wild	3
9	(United States)	Elyse Bennett	Montreal Roses	3
9	(United States)	Melanie Forbes	Ottawa Rapid	3
9	(Canada)	Kaylee Hunter	AFC Toronto	3
9	(Canada)	Mya Jones	Calgary Wild	3
9	(South Korea)	Lee Min-a	Ottawa Rapid	3
9	(Canada)	Chloe Minas	Montreal Roses	3
9	(Canada)	Lauren Rowe	AFC Toronto	3
9	(Canada)	Mégane Sauvé	Montreal Roses	3
9	(Canada)	Nikayla Small	AFC Toronto	3
9	(Canada)	Sarah Stratigakis	AFC Toronto	3
9	(Canada)	Julianne Vallerand	Halifax Tides	3

=== Clean sheets ===
Rank	Nat	Player	Team	Total
1	(Canada)	Anna Karpenko	Montreal Roses	8
2	(Canada)	Sabrina D'Angelo	AFC Toronto	6
2	(Slovakia)	Anika Tóth	Halifax Tides	6
4	(Canada)	Sarah Keilty-Dilling	Calgary Wild	4
5	(Canada)	Melissa Dagenais	Ottawa Rapid	3
5	(Canada)	Rylee Foster-Inman	Halifax Tides	3

== Attendance ==
Pos	Team	Pld	Total	High	Low	Median	Average	Change
1	Halifax Tides	12	47,065	5,516	3,368	3,819	3,922	+0.2%
2	AFC Toronto	13	48,298	7,157	2,118	3,007	3,715	−8.4%
3	Montreal Roses	13	47,296	17,077	1,792	2,457	3,638	+13.0%
4	Vancouver Rise	13	43,557	4,650	2,415	3,430	3,351	−21.1%
5	Calgary Wild	12	33,003	3,530	2,210	2,769	2,750	−18.3%
6	Ottawa Rapid	12	31,910	4,453	1,295	2,743	2,659	−12.6%
	League total	75	251,129	17,077	1,295	3,089	3,348	−7.8%

Updated to match(es) played on October 26, 2026 (end of regular season). Source: NSL

== Awards ==
=== Monthly Awards ===
Player of the Month
Month	Player	Ref
May	(United States) Elyse Bennett (Montreal)	
June	(Canada) Lauren Rowe (Toronto)	
July	(Canada) Keera Melenhorst (Ottawa)	
August	(Canada) Jessica De Filippo (Vancouver)	

=== Weekly Awards ===
Stars of the Week
Week	First Star	Second Star	Third Star	Ref
1	(United States) Elyse Bennett (Montreal)	(Nigeria) Esther Okoronkwo (Toronto)	(South Korea) Cho So-Hyun (Halifax)	
2	(Canada) Keera Melenhorst (Ottawa)	(Canada) Rylee Foster (Halifax)	(Ukraine) Tanya Boychuk (Montreal)	
3	(Canada) Delaney Baie Pridham (Ottawa)	(United States) Elyse Bennett (Montreal)	(Canada) Kaylee Hunter (Toronto)	
4	(Canada) Mya Jones (Calgary)	(United States) Jordyn Rhodes (Halifax)	(South Korea) Choo Hyo-joo (Ottawa)	
5	(Canada) Julianne Vallerand (Halifax)	(Ukraine) Tanya Boychuk (Montreal)	(Canada) Quinn (Vancouver)	
6	(Jamaica) Nikayla Small (Toronto)	(Canada) Delaney Baie Pridham (Ottawa)	(United States) Addy Weichers (Halifax)	
8	(Canada) Delaney Baie Pridham (Ottawa)	(Canada) Anna Karpenko (Montreal)	(Canada) Sarah Rollins (Toronto)	
9	(Canada) Julianne Vallerand (Halifax)	(Canada) Melissa Dagenais (Ottawa)	(Jamaica) Nikayla Small (Toronto)	
10	(Canada) Lauren Rowe (Toronto)	(Canada) Saorla Miller (Halifax)	(Canada) Liv Scott (Ottawa)	
11	(Ghana) Evelyn Badu (Montreal)	(Canada) Kaylee Hunter (Toronto)	(Norway) Johanne Fridlund (Ottawa)	
12	(South Korea) Lee Min-a (Ottawa)	(United States) Jorian Baucom (Calgary)	(Canada) Mia Pante (Vancouver)	
13	(Canada) Sadie Waite (Ottawa)	(Canada) Quinn (Vancouver)	(France) Charlotte Bilbault (Montreal)	
14	(Canada) Kaylee Hunter (Toronto)	(France) Charlotte Bilbault (Montreal)	(Canada) Keera Melenhorst (Ottawa)	
15	(Canada) Kaylee Hunter (Toronto)	(Canada) Lisa Pechersky (Montreal)	(United States) Jordyn Rhodes (Halifax)	
16	(Canada) Jessica De Filippo (Vancouver)	(United States) Colby Barnett (Toronto)	(Canada) Anika Tóth (Halifax)	
17	(Canada) Jessica De Filippo (Vancouver)	(Canada) Serita Thurton (Calgary)	(Canada) Anna Karpenko (Montreal)	
18	(Canada) Alex Lamontagne (Vancouver)	(United States) Jorian Baucom (Calgary)	(United States) Elyse Bennett (Montreal)	
19	(Canada) Kaylee Hunter (Toronto)	(Canada) Anne-Valérie Seto (Montreal)	(Australia) Kahli Johnson (Calgary)	
20	(United States) Elyse Bennett (Montreal)	(Canada) Grace Stordy (Calgary)	(Canada) Keera Melenhorst (Ottawa)	
21	(United States) Josie Aulicino (Calgary)	(Canada) Anna Bout (Vancouver)	(Canada) Lucy Cappadona (Montreal)	

Save of the Week
Week	Player	Ref
1	(Canada) Morgan McAslan (Vancouver)	
2	(Canada) Rylee Foster (Halifax)	
3	(Canada) Danielle Krzyzaniak (Toronto)	
4	(United States) Katelin Talbert (Calgary)	
5	(Canada) Melissa Dagenais (Ottawa)	
6	(Canada) Rylee Foster (Halifax)	
8	(Canada) Anna Karpenko (Montreal)	
9	(Canada) Melissa Dagenais (Ottawa)	
10	(Canada) Anika Toth (Halifax)	
11	(United States) Katelin Talbert (Calgary)	
12	(Canada) Melissa Dagenais (Ottawa)	
13	(Canada) Melissa Dagenais (Ottawa)	
14	(Canada) Sabrina D'Angelo (Toronto)	
15	(Canada) Sabrina D'Angelo (Toronto)	
16	(Canada) Anika Tóth (Halifax)	
17	(Canada) Anna Karpenko (Montreal)	
18	(Canada) Sabrina D'Angelo (Toronto)	
19	(Canada) Anna Karpenko (Montreal)	
20	(Canada) Sabrina D'Angelo (Toronto)	
21	(Canada) Sarah Keilty-Dilling (Calgary)	

Goal of the Week
Week	Player	Ref
1	(United States) Elyse Bennett (Montreal)	
2	(Canada) Keera Melenhorst (Ottawa)	
3	(Canada) Delaney Baie Pridham (Ottawa)	
4	(Canada) Sadie Waite (Ottawa)	
5	(Canada) Julianne Vallerand (Halifax)	
6	(Canada) Julia Benati (Halifax)	
8	(Canada) Lisa Pechersky (Montreal)	
9	(Australia) Kahli Johnson (Calgary)	
10	(Algeria) Anaïs Oularbi (Vancouver)	
11	(Ghana) Evelyn Badu (Montreal)	
12	(South Korea) Lee Min-a (Ottawa)	
13	(Canada) Sadie Waite (Ottawa)	
14	(Canada) Kaylee Hunter (Toronto)	
15	(Canada) Mimi Alidou (Montreal)	
16	(Canada) Nicola Golen (Ottawa)	
17	(Canada) Jessica De Filippo (Vancouver)	
18	(United States) Jorian Baucom (Calgary)	
19	(Canada) Kaylee Hunter (Toronto)	
20	(Canada) Julia Benati (Halifax)	
21	(Canada) Taegan Stewart (Calgary)	

=== Other Awards ===
Impact Award
Date	Player	Ref
September 4, 2026	(United States) Allie Hess (Calgary)	
September 11, 2026	(Jamaica) Nikayla Small (Toronto)	
September 16, 2026	(Canada) Emily Amano (Ottawa)	

== Foreign players ==
Rosters consisted of 20–25 players, of which a maximum of eight could be international players.

The following international players were signed for the 2026 season. Note that players may be considered domestic for NSL purposes (Canadian citizens, permanent residents, or refugees) while still representing other countries in international competitions.

Club	Player 1	Player 2	Player 3	Player 4	Player 5	Player 6	Player 7	Player 8	Injured	Former
AFC Toronto	(United States) Lena Silano	(United States) Croix Soto	(Nigeria) Esther Okoronkwo	(United States) Mia Fontana	(United States) Colby Barnett	(United States) Zoe Hasenauer			(Ghana) Linda Owusu Ansah	(Finland) Sofia Manner (United States) Jordan Brewster
Calgary Wild FC	(United States) Katelin Talbert	(United States) Meggie Dougherty Howard	(United States) Jorian Baucom	(New Zealand) Meikayla Moore	(Australia) Kahli Johnson	(United States) Madison Pogarch	(United States) Taylor Otto	(United States) Josie Aulucino	(United States) Allie Hess	(Venezuela) Michelle Romero
Halifax Tides FC	(United States) Sheyenne Allen	(Norway) Julie Pedersen	(South Korea) Cho So-hyun	(United States) Katherine Jordan	(Norway) Synne Moe	(Japan) Megumi Nakamura	(France) Éva Frémaux	(United States) Jordyn Rhodes		
Montreal Roses FC	(United States) Lucy Cappadona	(United States) Hailey Whitaker	(United States) Anna Heilferty	(United States) Elyse Bennett	(United States) Julia Leas	(Ghana) Evelyn Badu	(France) Charlotte Bilbault	(France) Ève Périsset		(South Korea) Choi Han-bin (South Korea) Kang Chae-rim
Ottawa Rapid FC	(Norway) Susanne Haaland	(Norway) Johanne Fridlund	(Nigeria) Ngozi Okobi-Okeoghene	(South Korea) Lee Min-a	(South Korea) Choo Hyo-joo	(South Korea) Jung Min-young	(United States) Jyllissa Harris			
Vancouver Rise FC	(Philippines) Jessika Cowart	(United States) Nikki Stanton	(Colombia) María Camila Reyes	(Japan) Yuka Okamoto	(Colombia) Maithé López	(Wales) Josie Longhurst	(Australia) Tori Tumeth	(Jamaica) Chantelle Swaby		(United States) Mariah Lee

== Broadcasting ==
All 75 Northern Super League regular season matches were be available nationally across multiple platforms, through TSN and CBC. In addition to linear broadcasts, a "Game of the Week" was streamed on CBC Gem and NSL.ca, while additional matches were streamed on TSN+ and NSL.ca. French-language coverage was available for all Montreal Roses matches, through RDS and ICI Radio-Canada Télé and ICI TOU.TV.
