= Addison Weichers =

American soccer player (born 2002)

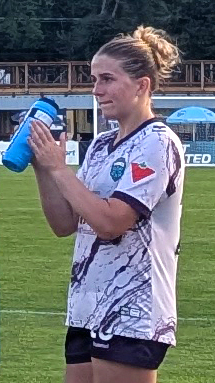
- Weichers in 2025 with Halifax Tides FC

Personal information
- Birth name: Addison Judith Symonds
- Date of birth: January 15, 2002 (age 24)
- Place of birth: Highland, Utah, United States
- Height: 1.70 m (5 ft 7 in)
- Position: Defender

Team information
- Current team: Halifax Tides FC
- Number: 16

Youth career
- Utah Celtic FC

College career
Years	Team	Apps	(Gls)
2021–2024	Utah State Aggies	90	(2)

Senior career*
Years	Team	Apps	(Gls)
2022–2024	Minnesota Aurora FC	34	(7)
2025–	Halifax Tides FC	19	(0)
- * Club domestic league appearances and goals as of October 17, 2025

Addison Judith Weichers (née Symonds; born January 15, 2002) is an American soccer player who plays for Halifax Tides FC in the Northern Super League.

== Early life ==
Weichers began playing soccer at age four. She played youth soccer with Utah Celtic FC. Weichers won the Utah 6A state championship as a high school junior.

== College career ==
In 2020, Weichers began attending Utah State University, where she played for the women's soccer team. She redshirted her first year, beginning to play in the fall of 2021. On August 19, 2021, she made her collegiate debut in a match against the Idaho State Bengals. At the end of the 2021 season, she was named to the Mountain West Conference All-Newcomer Team and was named to the TopDrawerSoccer Top 100 Freshman list. On August 25, 2022, she scored her first goal in a victory over the Illinois State Redbirds. In September 2024, she was named the Mountain West Conference Defensive Player of the Week. At the end of the 2024 season, she was named to the All-Pacific Region First Team. She was also named to the Mountain West All-Tournament Team in both 2023 and 2024. Over her time at Utah State, she was named to the Academic All-Mountain West and Mountain West Scholar-Athlete each year and was named an Academic All-District in 2022 and 2023.

== Club career ==
In 2022, Weichers joined Minnesota Aurora FC for their inaugural season in the USL W League and served as team captain. At the end of the 2022 season, she won the league's Goal of the Year award.

In February 2025, she signed with Canadian club Halifax Tides FC in the Northern Super League. In December 2025, she signed an extension for the 2026 season. She scored the first goal of a 3-1 victory over Ottawa Rapid FC on April 25, 2026, the Tides' opening game of the 2026 season.

== Career statistics ==
As of match played October 17, 2025

Club	Season	League			Playoffs		National cup		Other		Total	
Club	Season	Division	Apps	Goals	Apps	Goals	Apps	Goals	Apps	Goals	Apps	Goals
Minnesota Aurora FC	2022	USL W League	11	2	3	1	—		—		14	3
Minnesota Aurora FC	2023	USL W League	12	1	2	0	—		—		14	1
Minnesota Aurora FC	2024	USL W League	11	4	1	0	—		—		12	4
Minnesota Aurora FC	Total		34	7	6	1	0	0	0	0	40	8
Halifax Tides FC	2025	Northern Super League	19	0	—		—		—		19	0
Career total			53	7	6	1	0	0	0	0	59	8
