= Sadie Waite =

Canadian soccer player (born 2004)

Personal information
- Full name: Sadie Elizabeth Waite
- Date of birth: October 21, 2004 (age 22)
- Place of birth: St. Thomas, Ontario, Canada
- Height: 1.60 m (5 ft 3 in)
- Position: Midfielder

Team information
- Current team: Ottawa Rapid FC

Youth career
- St. Thomas SC
- Whitecaps London
- NDC Ontario

College career
Years	Team	Apps	(Gls)
2022–2025	Nebraska Cornhuskers	73	(8)

Senior career*
Years	Team	Apps	(Gls)
2021–2023	FC London	26	(4)
2026–	Ottawa Rapid FC	25	(3)

International career
2024	Canada U20	1	(0)
- * Club domestic league appearances and goals

Sadie Elizabeth Waite (born October 21, 2004) is a Canadian soccer player who plays as a midfielder for Northern Super League club Ottawa Rapid FC. She played college soccer for the Nebraska Cornhuskers.

== Early life ==
Waite began playing youth soccer at the age of four with St. Thomas SC. She also played for the Whitecaps London, and NDC Ontario.

== College career ==
Waite began her college career at the University of Nebraska in 2022, and made a total of 73 appearances for the Nebraska Cornhuskers. She started in every game during her senior year season, and was named a Big Ten Preseason Player to Watch for 2025.

== Club career ==
In 2021, Waite began playing with FC London in League1 Ontario. In 2022, she was named a league U18 All-Star.

In 2026, Waite joined Northern Super League side Ottawa Rapid FC, signing a two-year contract and becoming the Rapid's first signing ahead of the 2026 season, with the club's technical director Kristina Kiss saying of Waite "She reads the game, she controls the pace and she's fearless in the middle". Waite made her competitive debut for the Rapid on April 25, 2026, being brought on in the second half of a 3–1 loss against Halifax Tides FC, the Rapid's opening game of the 2026 season. She scored her first goal for the Rapid in a 4–0 win over Vancouver Rise FC on May 6, 2026.

== International career ==
Waite first joined the Canadian national team youth program when she was 14 years old. On 27 March 2024, she was called up to the under-20 roster, and on 19 August she was selected for the 2024 FIFA U-20 Women's World Cup in Colombia. In her lone appearance with the team, she came on as a substitute in Canada's 9–0 win over Fiji.

== Career statistics ==
As of November 8, 2025

Appearances and goals by club, season and competition
Club	Season	League			Playoffs		National cup		League cup		Total	
Club	Season	Division	Apps	Goals	Apps	Goals	Apps	Goals	Apps	Goals	Apps	Goals
FC London	2021	League1 Ontario	9	0	1	0	—		—		10	0
FC London	2022	League1 Ontario	14	4	0	0	—		—		14	4
FC London	2023	League1 Ontario	3	0	0	0	—		—		3	0
FC London	Total		26	4	1	0	0	0	0	0	27	4
Career total			26	4	1	0	0	0	0	0	27	4
