= Jordyn Rhodes =

American soccer player (born 2000)

- Rhodes in 2026

Personal information
- Full name: Jordyn Lee Rhodes
- Date of birth: September 12, 2000 (age 26)
- Place of birth: South Lebanon, Ohio, United States
- Height: 5 ft 8 in (1.73 m)
- Position: Forward

Team information
- Current team: Halifax Tides FC
- Number: 30

Youth career
- Cincinnati United SC

College career
Years	Team	Apps	(Gls)
2019–2023	Kentucky Wildcats	85	(45)

Senior career*
Years	Team	Apps	(Gls)
2022	Kings Hammer FC	9	(0)
2023	Racing Louisville FC B	7	(4)
2024	Tindastóll	21	(12)
2025	Valur	23	(9)
2026–	Halifax Tides FC	0	(0)
- * Club domestic league appearances and goals as of December 31, 2025

Jordyn Lee Rhodes (born September 12, 2000) is an American soccer player who plays for Halifax Tides FC in the Northern Super League.

== Early life ==
Rhodes played youth soccer with Cincinnati United SC.

== College career ==
In October 2016, she committed to attend Indiana University Bloomington to play for the women's soccer team beginning in September 2019 and signed her National Letter of Intent in November 2018. However, in the spring of 2019, she was informed by the program's new coach that she would not be part of the women's soccer team, so she re-entered the recruiting process.

In 2019, Rhodes began attending the University of Kentucky, where she played for the women's soccer team. She scored two goals in the first match of the 2019 season, in a 3-3 draw against the Bowling Green Falcons. She was named to the SEC First-Year Academic Honor Roll in her first year.

Ahead of her sophomore season, she was named to the SEC Preseason Watch List. In November 2020, she was named the SEC Offensive Player of the Week. On November 13, 2020, she scored her first career hat trick in a 6-5 loss to the Florida Gators in the first round of the SEC Tournament. At the end of the season, she was named to the All-SEC First Team, the All-Southeast Region Third Team, and the SEC Academic Honor Roll.

She was again named to the SEC Preseason Watch List in 2021. On August 21, 2021, she scored a hat trick in a 3-0 victory over the Marshall Thundering Herd. At the end of the season she was named to the All-SEC Second Team and the All-Southeast Region Second Team. She also earned SEC Academic Honor Roll recognition for the third time.

Ahead of her senior season in 2022, she was again named to the SEC Preseason Watch List, and also once again earned SEC Academic Honor Roll.

She returned for a fifth season in 2023 and was named a team captain. She earned SEC Offensive Player of the Year honors twice. On September 29, 2023, she scored her 45th goal for the school to become the program's all-time leading scorer. At the end of the season, she was named to the All-SEC First Team, All-Southeast Region First Team, and a Second Team Scholar All-America.

== Club career ==
In 2022, Rhodes played with Kings Hammer FC in the USL W League.

In 2023, she played with Racing Louisville FC B in the USL W League.

In January 2024, Rhodes signed with Icelandic first tier Besta deild kvenna club Tindastóll. After some initial paperwork issues, she was finally cleared to play for the team in April. She was named the league's Player of the Month for June 2024. At the end of the season, she was named to the league's Team of the Season.

In March 2025, she signed with Valur in the Icelandic first tier. On August 13, 2025, she scored a hat trick in a 4-2 victory over Stjarnan.

In January 2026, she signed with Canadian club Halifax Tides FC in the Northern Super League. She scored the winning goal in a 3-1 victory over Ottawa Rapid on April 25, 2026, the Tides' opening game of the 2026 season.

== Career statistics ==
As of December 31, 2025

Club	Season	League			Playoffs		Domestic Cup		Other		Total	
Club	Season	Division	Apps	Goals	Apps	Goals	Apps	Goals	Apps	Goals	Apps	Goals
Kings Hammer FC	2022	USL W League	9	0	—		—		—		9	0
Racing Louisville FC B	2023	USL W League	7	4	—		—		—		7	4
Tindastóll	2024	Besta deild kvenna	21	12	—		1	1	—		22	13
Valur	2025	Besta deild kvenna	23	9	—		3	1	1 (Note: Appearance in Icelandic Women's Football Super Cup)	0	27	10
Career total			60	25	0	0	4	2	1	0	65	27
