= Anna Karpenko =

Canadian soccer player (born 2002)

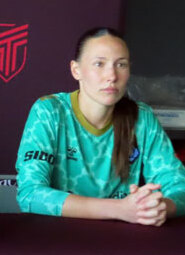
- Karpenko in 2026

Personal information
- Date of birth: April 10, 2002 (age 24)
- Place of birth: Toronto, Ontario, Canada
- Height: 1.73 m (5 ft 8 in)
- Position: Goalkeeper

Team information
- Current team: Montreal Roses FC
- Number: 1

Youth career
- Richmond Hill SC
- Vaughan Azzurri
- Ontario REX

College career
Years	Team	Apps	(Gls)
2021–2023	Harvard Crimson	41	(0)
2024	Georgetown Hoyas	19	(0)

Senior career*
Years	Team	Apps	(Gls)
2016–2017	Vaughan Azzurri	3	(0)
2022–2024	Vaughan Azzurri	20	(0)
2025–	Montreal Roses FC	18	(0)

International career^{‡}
2018	Canada U17	10	(0)
2019	Canada U18	1	(0)
2020–2022	Canada U20	13	(0)
- * Club domestic league appearances and goals as of October 20, 2025 ‡ National team caps and goals as of August 17, 2022

Anna Karpenko (born April 10, 2002) is a Canadian soccer player who plays as a goalkeeper for Montreal Roses FC in the Northern Super League.

== Early life ==
Born in Canada on 10 April 2002, Karpenko is of Belarusian descent through her parents. She began playing youth soccer at age six with Richmond Hill SC. She later played with Vaughan Azzurri and the Ontario REX program.

== College career ==
In 2020, Karpenko began attending Harvard University, where she played for the women's soccer team. However, the first season was cancelled due to the COVID-19 pandemic, delaying her debut until the following season. She made her collegiate debut on August 27 against the Fairfield Stags. Ahead of the 2023 season, she was named a team captain. She helped Harvard win the Ivy League title in 2023 and was named to the All-Ivy League Second Team and the Ivy League All-Tournament team.

In 2024, she transferred to Georgetown University for her graduate season to play for the women's soccer team. She was named to the Big East Conference Honor Roll for the first two weeks of the season.

== Club career ==
In 2016 and 2017, she played with Vaughan Azzurri in League1 Ontario. She returned to play for them from 2022 to 2024.

In February 2025, she signed with Northern Super League club Montreal Roses FC. She recorded a clean sheet in the club's first ever franchise victory in their debut match on April 19, 2025, a 1-0 victory over AFC Toronto.

== International career ==
In February 2017, Karpenko made her debut in the Canadian national program attending a camp with the Canada U17 team. That call-up convinced her to play goalkeeper full-time, after playing as both goalkeeper and outfield player prior to that. She was then named to the side for the 2018 CONCACAF Women's U-17 Championship (winning a bronze medal) and the 2018 FIFA U-17 Women's World Cup (finishing a fourth).

She subsequently represented the Canada U20 team at the 2020 CONCACAF Women's U-20 Championship, 2022 CONCACAF Women's U-20 Championship, and the 2022 FIFA U-20 Women's World Cup. At the 2022 CONCACAF U20s, she helped Canada win the bronze medal and won the Golden Glove as the top goalkeeper of the tournament and was named to the tournament Best XI.

In late November 2021, she was called up to the Canada senior team for a training camp. In April 2024, she was named to the roster for the 2024 SheBelieves Cup.
