= Choo Hyo-joo =

South Korean footballer (born 2000)

Choo Hyo-joo 추효주
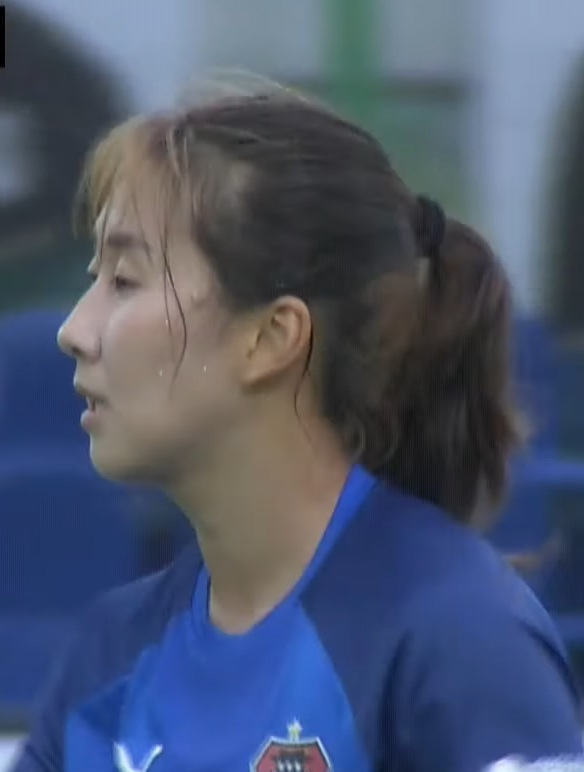
- Choo in 2021

Personal information
- Date of birth: 29 July 2000 (age 26)
- Place of birth: Busan, South Korea
- Height: 1.64 m (5 ft 5 in)
- Positions: Winger; wing-back

Team information
- Current team: Ottawa Rapid
- Number: 19

Youth career
- Ulsan College

Senior career*
Years	Team	Apps	(Gls)
2021–2023	Suwon FC	65	(14)
2024	Hyundai Steel Red Angels	18	(1)
2025–	Ottawa Rapid	42	(4)

International career^{‡}
2018–2019	South Korea U20	10	(4)
2019–	South Korea	68	(6)
- * Club domestic league appearances and goals as of 30 October 2026 ‡ National team caps and goals as of 2 October 2026

Choo Hyo-joo (Korean: 추효주; born 29 July 2000) is a South Korean footballer who plays as a winger for Northern Super League side Ottawa Rapid and the South Korea national team.

== Club career ==
After graduating from Ulsan College, Choo joined Suwon FC in early 2021. She made 65 appearances for Suwon over three years, recording 14 goals and eight assists. After leaving Suwon, Choo joined Incheon Hyundai Steel Red Angels, signing a two-year contract with an overseas release clause. After one season with Incheon she transferred to Ottawa Rapid FC of the newly-formed Northern Super League. She started in Ottawa's inaugural match, a 2–1 victory over AFC Toronto. On 28 November 2025, Choo signed a new contract with the Rapid, extending her time with the club through the 2026 Northern Super League season.

== International career ==
In 2018 and 2019, Choo played for the South Korea under-20 team, scoring four goals in ten appearances.

She made her debut for the senior team on 15 December 2019 in a 3–0 win against Chinese Taipei at the 2019 EAFF E-1 Football Championship, where South Korea finished as runners-up to Japan.

In July 2023, Choo was included in the squad for the 2023 FIFA Women's World Cup.
