= Naya Cardoza =

Canadian-Jamaican footballer (born 1998)

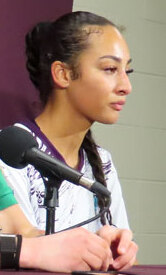
- Cardoza in 2026

Personal information
- Date of birth: 2 November 2004 (age 22)
- Place of birth: Ajax, Ontario, Canada
- Height: 5 ft 9 in (1.75 m)
- Position: Defender

Team information
- Current team: Halifax Tides FC
- Number: 2

Youth career
- Pickering FC
- Woodbridge Strikers

College career
Years	Team	Apps	(Gls)
2022–2025	Brown Bears	65	(13)

Senior career*
Years	Team	Apps	(Gls)
2017–2019	Durham United FA	4	(1)
2021	Woodbridge Strikers	2	(2)
2023–2024	Vaughan Azzurri	9	(2)
2024	→ Vaughan Azzurri B	1	(1)
2025	Pickering FC	8	(7)
2026–	Halifax Tides FC	0	(0)

International career^{‡}
2024–	Jamaica	8	(1)
- * Club domestic league appearances and goals as of 31 December 2025 ‡ National team caps and goals as of June 29, 2025

Naya Simone Cardoza (born November 2, 2004) is a footballer who plays for Halifax Tides FC in the Northern Super League. Born in Canada, she plays for the Jamaica national team.

== Early life ==
Cardoza played youth soccer with Pickering FC and Woodbridge Strikers and also played with the Ontario provincial team.

== College career ==
In 2022, Cardoza began attending Brown University, where she played for the women's soccer team. On September 1, 2022, she scored her first collegiate goal in a 1–0 victory over the Central Connecticut Blue Devils. On October 31, 2022, she was named the Ivy League Rookie of the Year. At the end of her freshman season, she was named to the All-NEWISA Second Team, TopDrawerSoccer Freshman Best XI Second Team, and All-Ivy League Honorable Mention. In October 2024, she was named the Ivy League Defensive Player of the Week. At the end of 2024, she was again named an All-Ivy League Honorable Mention. In September 2025, she was named the Ivy League Defensive Player of the Week in back-to-back weeks and to the TopDrawerSoccer's National Team of the Week. At the end of her senior season, she was named to the All-Ivy League First Team, All-East Region First Team, All-NEWISA First Team, and the Ivy League All-Tournament Team. She was also named to the NEWISA Senior Bowl.

== Club career ==
Cardoza played in League1 Ontario with stints with Durham United FA, Woodbridge Strikers, Vaughan Azzurri, and then returning to Pickering FC (who re-branded from Durham United).

In February 2026, Cardoza signed with Halifax Tides FC in the Northern Super League.

== International career ==
Cardoza played with the Jamaica U17 team.

In the spring of 2024, Cardoza was called up to a camp with the Jamaica national team. She made her debut in February 2024 against Chile. On February 26, 2025, she scored her first international goal in a match against Peru.

== Career statistics ==
As of December 31, 2025

Club	Season	League			Playoffs		Domestic Cup		League Cup		Total	
Club	Season	Division	Apps	Goals	Apps	Goals	Apps	Goals	Apps	Goals	Apps	Goals
Durham United FA	2017	League1 Ontario	1	0	—		—		0	0	1	0
Durham United FA	2018	League1 Ontario	1	0	0	0	—		0	0	1	0
Durham United FA	2019	League1 Ontario	2	1	—		—		—		2	1
Durham United FA	Total		4	1	0	0	0	0	0	0	4	1
Woodbridge Strikers	2021	League1 Ontario	2	2	0	0	—		—		2	2
Vaughan Azzurri	2023	League1 Ontario	7	2	1	0	—		—		8	2
Vaughan Azzurri	2024	League1 Ontario Premier	2	0	—		—		0	0	2	2
Vaughan Azzurri	Total		9	2	1	0	0	0	0	0	10	2
Vaughan Azzurri B	2024	League2 Ontario	1	1	0	0	—		—		1	1
Pickering FC	2025	League1 Ontario Championship	8	7	—		—		1	0	9	7
Career total			24	13	1	0	0	0	1	0	26	13
