= Delaney Baie Pridham =

Canadian soccer player (born 1997)

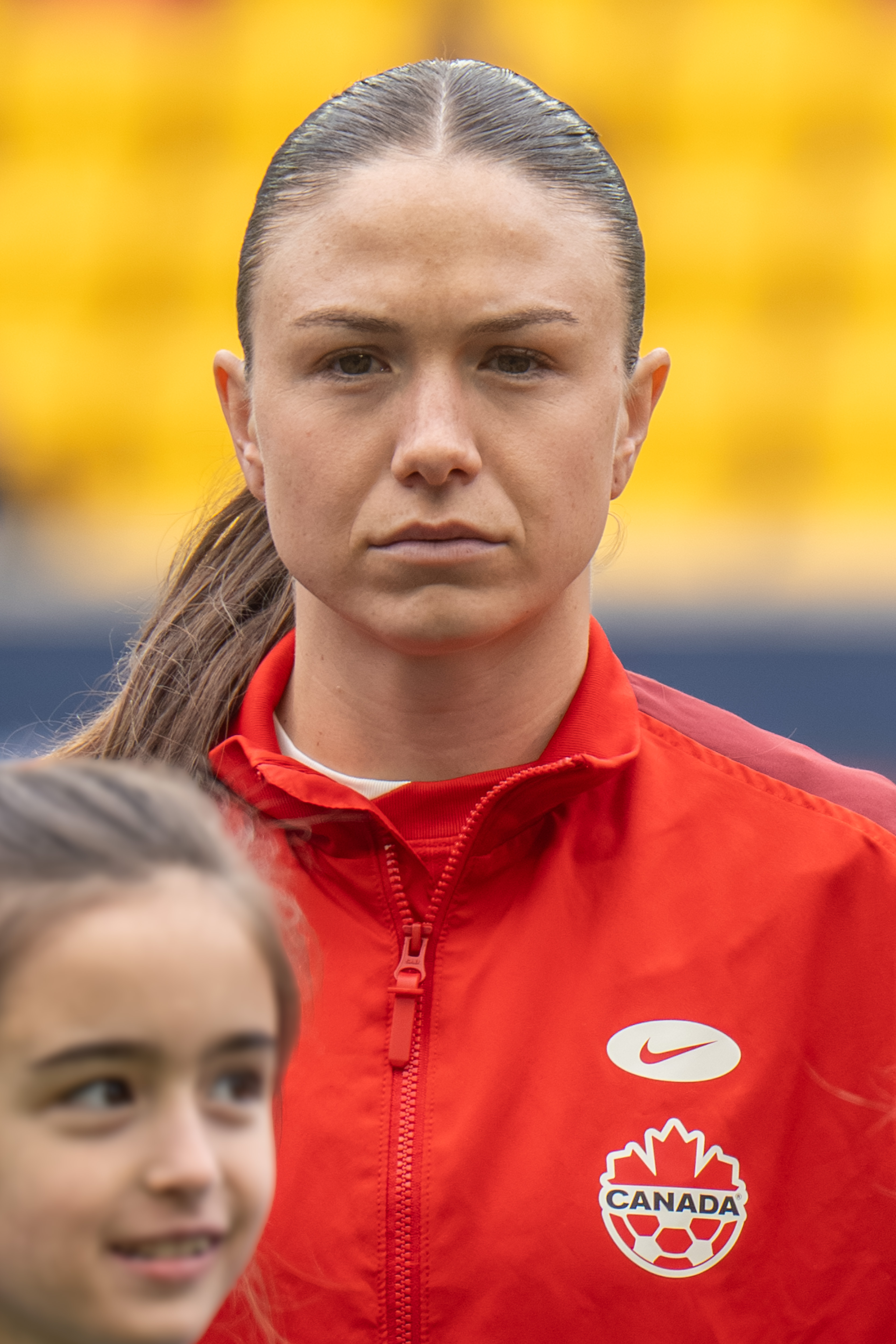
- Pridham with Canada in 2026

Personal information
- Date of birth: September 1, 1997 (age 29)
- Place of birth: Saratoga, California, United States
- Height: 5 ft 6 in (1.68 m)
- Positions: Forward; midfielder

Team information
- Current team: Ottawa Rapid
- Number: 22

Youth career
- De Anza Force

College career
| Years | Team | Apps | (Gls) |
| 2016–2019 | Santa Clara Broncos | 79 | (6) |

Senior career*
| Years | Team | Apps | (Gls) |
| 2019 | MVLA Wolves | 2 | (1) |
| 2021 | ÍBV | 10 | (7) |
| 2021–2022 | Kristianstads DFF | 33 | (4) |
| 2023–2024 | Linköping FC | 19 | (1) |
| 2025– | Ottawa Rapid | 46 | (28) |

International career^{‡}
| 2026– | Canada | 9 | (1) |
- * Club domestic league appearances and goals as of October 30, 2026 ‡ National team caps and goals as of October 12, 2026

Delaney Baie "DB" Pridham (born September 1, 1997) is a professional soccer player who plays as a forward for Northern Super League club Ottawa Rapid. Born in the United States, she represents Canada at international level.

She previously played collegiate soccer for the Santa Clara Broncos, and professionally for ÍBV in Iceland, and for Kristianstads DFF and Linköpings FC in Sweden.

== Early and college career ==
Pridham played youth soccer for De Anza Force in the ECNL and for her high school team, the St. Francis Lancers. She committed to Santa Clara University in June 2014, and joined the Broncos in 2016.

Pridham made her collegiate debut on August 19, 2016, in a 3–2 win over USC. As a freshman, she played in 21 games, recording one assist. The following year, she made 20 appearances, scoring three goals and registering two assists, for a total of 8 points. As a junior, she appeared in all 22 games for the Broncos, once again recording three goals and two assists. In her final season at Santa Clara, she played in 16 games, recording two assists. She finished her time in college with a total of six goals and seven assists in 79 games.

== Club career ==
In 2019, Pridham played with the MVLA Wolves in the Women's Premier Soccer League.

=== ÍBV ===
In January 2021, Pridham signed with Úrvalsdeild kvenna side ÍBV. She made a total of 13 appearances for ÍBV – ten in the league, two in the Icelandic Cup, and one in the Icelandic League Cup – scoring a total of eleven goals in all competitions.

=== Kristianstads DFF ===
On August 15, 2021, she joined Damallsvenskan club Kristianstads DFF. Ten days later, she made her debut in a 3–1 loss to BK Häcken. On August 18, 2022, she made her Champions League debut in a 3–1 defeat to Ajax. She left Kristianstad in December 2022.

=== Linköpings FC ===
On February 16, 2023, Pridham signed with Linköpings FC, following a successful trial period with the club. However, just a month later, she suffered a season-ending knee injury in a match against Kristianstad and was ruled out for the whole year. She left the club at the end of the 2024 season.

=== Ottawa Rapid FC ===
In 2025, Pridham joined Northern Super League club Ottawa Rapid. On April 27, she made her debut in a 2–1 win over AFC Toronto. The following week, she scored her first goal in a 2–1 loss to the Montreal Roses. On June 7, she recorded the first-ever hat-trick in NSL history after scoring three times in a win over Toronto. On July 19, Pridham scored in a 3–0 win over the Calgary Wild, becoming the first player in league history to score 10 goals. She was named the NSL Player of the Month for August, having scored 6 goals and registered two assists across 6 matches in that month. On September 17, 2025, she scored the winning goal in the third minute of added time of the Rapid's 2–1 win over the Calgary Wild, a victory which earned Ottawa a place in the playoffs during their inaugural season in the NSL. She won the first ever NSL Golden Boot award, ending the 2025 regular season with 20 goals. Speaking about the achievement, Rapid head coach Katrine Pedersen said "DB brings something special to our team that you can't teach, a natural ability to find the back of the net when it matters most. But what makes her truly exceptional is her drive, how she elevates everyone around her through her work ethic and her commitment to her teammates." In addition, she was also named the league's Forward of the Year and Player of the Year, as well as being named to the league's Team of the Season.

On August 17, 2026, it was announced that Pridham had signed a two-year contract extension, keeping her with the Rapid through the 2028 season.

== International career ==
Pridham was born in the United States to Canadian parents, and holds both American and Canadian citizenship. In June 2022, she was named to Canada's preliminary roster for the 2022 CONCACAF W Championship. In November 2025, she was called up to the official Canada squad for the first time. However, as she did not have a physical Canadian passport at the time, she was not able to play, and instead was only able to be a training player. On March 1, 2026, Pridham made her debut for Canada, starting in a 4–1 win against Colombia in the 2026 SheBelieves Cup, where she played on the right wing. She was part of the Canada squad which finished second at the tournament following a 0–0 win on penalties over Argentina on March 7, 2026, in which Pridham started.

Called up to the national team squad for the 2026 FIFA Series in Brazil, Pridham earned her first international assist in a 4–0 win over Zambia on April 11, 2026. She scored her first international goal for Canada in a 3–4 loss friendly against Denmark on October 12, 2026.

== Career statistics ==
=== Club ===
As of October 30, 2026.

| Club | League | Season | League | | Playoffs | | National Cup (Note: Includes the Icelandic Cup and the Svenska Cupen.) | | League Cup (Note: Includes the Icelandic League Cup.) | | Continental (Note: Appearance(s) in the UEFA Women's Champions League.) | | Total | |
| Club | League | Season | Apps | Goals | Apps | Goals | Apps | Goals | Apps | Goals | Apps | Goals | Apps | Goals |
|---|---|---|---|---|---|---|---|---|---|---|---|---|---|---|
| ÍBV | Úrvalsdeild kvenna | 2021 | 10 | 7 | — | | 2 | 1 | 1 | 3 | — | | 13 | 11 |
| Kristianstads DFF | Damallsvenskan | 2021 | 7 | 1 | — | | 1 | 0 | — | | 0 | 0 | 8 | 1 |
| Kristianstads DFF | Damallsvenskan | 2022 | 26 | 3 | — | | 4 | 3 | — | | 2 | 0 | 32 | 6 |
| Linköpings FC | Damallsvenskan | 2023 | 0 | 0 | — | | 1 | 0 | — | | 0 | 0 | 1 | 0 |
| Linköpings FC | Damallsvenskan | 2024 | 19 | 1 | — | | 1 | 2 | — | | 2 | 0 | 22 | 3 |
| Ottawa Rapid | Northern Super League | 2025 | 25 | 18 | 2 | 2 | — | | — | | — | | 27 | 20 |
| Ottawa Rapid | Northern Super League | 2026 | 21 | 10 | 0 | 0 | — | | — | | — | | 21 | 10 |
| Career total | | | 108 | 40 | 2 | 2 | 9 | 6 | 1 | 3 | 4 | 0 | 124 | 51 |

=== International goals ===
Scores and results list Canada's goal tally first, score column indicates score after each Pridham goal.

List of international goals scored by Delaney Baie Pridham
| No. | Date | Venue | Opponent | Score | Result | Competition |
|---|---|---|---|---|---|---|
| 1 | October 12, 2026 | BMO Field, Toronto, Canada | Denmark | 1–0 | 3–4 | Friendly |

== Personal life ==
Pridham majored in political science. She is the younger sister of Mackenzie Pridham.

== Honors ==
Individual

- Northern Super League Golden Boot: 2025
- Northern Super League Player of the Year: 2025
- Northern Super League Forward of the Year: 2025
- Northern Super League Team of the Season: 2025
