= Julianne Vallerand =

Canadian soccer player (born 2001)

Personal information
- Full name: Julianne Rita Marie Vallerand
- Date of birth: August 9, 2001 (age 25)
- Place of birth: Montréal, Québec, Canada
- Height: 5 ft 6 in (1.68 m)
- Position: Centre-back

Team information
- Current team: Halifax Tides FC
- Number: 44

Youth career
- CS Terrebonne
- 2016–2017: AS Varennes

College career
Years	Team	Apps	(Gls)
2019–2023	West Virginia Mountaineers	80	(16)

Senior career*
Years	Team	Apps	(Gls)
2018	Lakers du Lac St-Louis	10	(1)
2019	CS Mont-Royal Outremont	5	(2)
2021–2022	AS Blainville	4	(0)
2024–2025	Spokane Zephyr FC	11	(1)
2025–	Halifax Tides FC	12	(0)

International career^{‡}
2016	Canada U15	7	(1)
2018	Canada U17	8	(0)
2019	Canada U20		
- * Club domestic league appearances and goals as of October 17, 2025 ‡ National team caps and goals as of December 1, 2018

Julianne Rita Marie "Jubes" Vallerand (born August 9, 2001) is a Canadian soccer player who plays for Halifax Tides FC in the Northern Super League.

== Early life ==
Vallerand played youth soccer with CS Terrebonne and AS Varennes. She played with Team Quebec at the 2017 Canada Summer Games, winning gold.

== College career ==
In 2019, Vallerand began attending West Virginia University, where she played for the women's soccer team. On August 23, 2019, she made her debut and scored her first goal in a 2-0 victory over the Duquesne Dukes. In August 2021, she was named the West Virginia Student Athlete of the Week. In October 2023, she was named the Big 12 Conference Defender of the Week. She was named to the Big 12 All-Academic Team in each of her five seasons, as well as the Academic All-District Team in her final three seasons. Over her five seasons, she scored 16 goals and added another six assists, while obtaining both a bachelor's degree in criminology and a Master of Business Administration.

== Club career ==
In 2018, Vallerand played in the Première ligue de soccer du Québec with Lakers du Lac St-Louis. In 2019, she joined CS Mont-Royal Outremont. In 2021, she joined AS Blainville.

In May 2024, Vallerand signed with Spokane Zephyr FC of the USL Super League. On October 27, 2024, she made her professional debut, starting against Tampa Bay Sun FC. On December 14, 2024, she scored her first professional goal, also against Tampa Bay Sun. She was named to the league's Team of the Month in December 2024.

In July 2025, she signed with Northern Super League club Halifax Tides FC. After making 12 appearances and registering her first two professional assists during the 2025 season, it was announced on December 16, 2025 that she had signed a contract extension to keep her with the Tides through the 2026 season. She scored the final goal of a 3-1 victory over Ottawa Rapid FC on April 25, 2026, the Tides' opening game of the 2026 season.

== International career ==
Vallerand played with the Canada U15 at the 2016 CONCACAF Girls' U-15 Championship, winning silver and being named to the tournament All-Star Team. In 2017, she played with the Canada U17 team the Four Nations Cup. She later played with the squad at the 2018 CONCACAF Women's U-17 Championship (winning bronze) and the 2018 FIFA U-17 Women's World Cup (finishing fourth). In July 2019, she was named to the Canada U20 team for a series of friendlies in England.

== Career statistics ==
As of July 30, 2025

Club	Season	League			Playoffs		National Cup		League Cup		Total	
Club	Season	League	Apps	Goals	Apps	Goals	Apps	Goals	Apps	Goals	Apps	Goals
Lakers du Lac St-Louis	2018	Première ligue de soccer du Québec	10	1	—		—		—		10	1
CS Mont-Royal Outremont	2019	Première ligue de soccer du Québec	5	2	—		—		—		5	2
AS Blainville	2021	Première ligue de soccer du Québec	1	0	—		—		0	0	1	0
AS Blainville	2022	Première ligue de soccer du Québec	3	0	—		—		0	0	3	0
AS Blainville	Total		4	0	0	0	0	0	0	0	4	0
Spokane Zephyr FC	2024–25	USL Super League	11	1	—		—		—		11	1
Halifax Tides FC	2025	Northern Super League	12	0	—		—		—		12	0
Career total			42	4	0	0	0	0	0	0	42	4
