= Synne Moe =

Norwegian footballer (born 2002)

Personal information
- Full name: Synne Fredriksen Moe
- Date of birth: October 20, 2002 (age 24)
- Place of birth: Bodø, Norway
- Position: Midfielder

Team information
- Current team: Halifax Tides FC
- Number: 21

Youth career
- 2014–2018: Innstrandens
- 2019–2021: Grand Bodø

Senior career*
Years	Team	Apps	(Gls)
2017–2018	Innstrandens 2	22	(6)
2018	Innstrandens	4	(0)
2019	Grand Bodø 2	7	(0)
2019–2023	Grand Bodø	61	(4)
2024–2025	Bodø/Glimt	50	(2)
2025	Bodø/Glimt 2	1	(3)
2026–	Halifax Tides FC	3	(0)
- * Club domestic league appearances and goals as of 13 June 2026

Synne Fredriksen Moe (born 20 October 2002) is a Norwegian footballer who plays for Halifax Tides FC in the Northern Super League.

== Early life ==
Moe played youth football with Innstrandens, serving as captain of her team in her later years, and winning the U16 Cup in 2017.

== Club career ==
Moe began her senior career with Innstrandens, after progressing through their youth system.

In 2019, she moved to Grand Bodø. On 16 October 2022, she scored in a 2–1 victory over KIL/Hemne (she was initially credited with both goals, but one was later changed to an own goal) in the playoff series.

In 2024, she joined Bodø/Glimt in the Toppserien. In January 2025, she extended her contract for an additional season. She departed the club after the 2025 season.

In January 2026, Moe signed with Canadian Northern Super League club Halifax Tides FC.

== Career statistics ==
As of October 12, 2024

Club	Season	League			Playoffs		Domestic Cup		Other		Total	
Club	Season	Division	Apps	Goals	Apps	Goals	Apps	Goals	Apps	Goals	Apps	Goals
Innstrandens 2	2017	2. divisjon	6	2	–		–		–		6	2
Innstrandens 2	2018	2. divisjon	16	4	–		–		–		16	4
Innstrandens 2	Total		22	6	0	0	0	0	0	0	22	6
Innstrandens	2018	2. divisjon	4	0	–		0	0	–		4	0
Grand Bodø 2	2019	2. divisjon	7	0	–		–		–		7	0
Grand Bodø	2019	1. divisjon	17	0	–		0	0	2 (Note: Appearance(s) in promotion/relegation playoffs)	0	19	0
Grand Bodø	2021	2. divisjon	5	1	–		2	0	–		7	1
Grand Bodø	2022	1. divisjon	23	3	–		1	0	–		24	3
Grand Bodø	2023	1. divisjon	16	0	–		1	0	–		17	0
Grand Bodø	Total		61	4	0	0	4	0	2	0	67	4
Bodø/Glimt	2024	1. divisjon	24	2	–		3	0	2	0	29	2
Bodø/Glimt	2025	Toppserien	26	0	–		1	0	–		7	1
Bodø/Glimt	Total		50	2	0	0	4	0	2	0	56	2
Bodø/Glimt 2	2024	3. divisjon	1	3	–		–		–		1	3
Career total			145	15	0	0	8	0	4	0	157	15
