= Julie Pedersen =

Norwegian footballer (born 1999)

Personal information
- Full name: Julie Kjosvold Pedersen
- Date of birth: 4 January 1999 (age 27)
- Place of birth: Notodden, Norway
- Position: Defender

Team information
- Current team: Halifax Tides FC

Youth career
- 2012: SK Snøgg
- 2013–2015: Notodden FK

Senior career*
Years	Team	Apps	(Gls)
2015	Notodden FK	14	(4)
2016–2017	SK Snøgg 2	8	(1)
2016–2019	SK Snøgg	79	(12)
2020	Øvrevoll Hosle IL	3	(0)
2021	SK Snøgg	8	(9)
2021	SK Snøgg 2	1	(0)
2022–2025	Odds BK	82	(24)
2025	Odds BK 2	3	(0)
2026–	Halifax Tides FC	0	(0)
- * Club domestic league appearances and goals as of 17 January 2026

Julie Kjosvold Pedersen (born 4 January 1999) is a Norwegian footballer who plays for Halifax Tides FC in the Northern Super League.

== Club career ==
Pedersen began her senior career with Notodden FK. She then played with SK Snøgg.

In January 2022, she joined Odds BK. She earned the club's Goal of the Year award in 2022. She would commute two hours each way to Skien to play and train with Odds, from her home in Notodden.

In February 2026, Pedersen signed with Canadian club Halifax Tides FC in the Northern Super League.

== Personal life ==
Pedersen studied nursing in university. Pedersen's boyfriend Mads Fagerli Halsøy is also a professional footballer.

== Career statistics ==
As of December 31, 2025

Club	Season	League			Playoffs		Domestic Cup		Other		Total	
Club	Season	Division	Apps	Goals	Apps	Goals	Apps	Goals	Apps	Goals	Apps	Goals
Notodden FK	2015	4. divisjon	14	4	–		–		–		6	2
SK Snøgg 2	2016	3. divisjon	2	0	–		–		–		2	0
SK Snøgg 2	2017	3. divisjon	6	1	–		–		–		6	1
SK Snøgg 2	Total		8	1	0	0	0	0	0	0	8	1
SK Snøgg	2016	2. divisjon	22	0	–		1	0	–		23	0
SK Snøgg	2017	2. divisjon	20	4	–		2	0	–		22	4
SK Snøgg	2018	2. divisjon	15	5	–		2	0	2 (Note: Appearance(s) in promotion/relegation playoffs)	0	19	5
SK Snøgg	2019	1. divisjon	22	3	–		0	0	–		22	3
SK Snøgg	Total		79	12	0	0	4	0	2	0	85	12
Øvrevoll Hosle IL	2020	1. divisjon	3	0	–		1	0	–		4	0
SK Snøgg	2021	2. divisjon	8	9	–		1	0	–		9	9
SK Snøgg 2	2021	3. divisjon	1	0	–		–		–		1	0
Odds BK	2022	2. divisjon	19	10	–		2	1	4	0	25	11
Odds BK	2023	2. divisjon	26	12	–		2	0	–		28	12
Odds BK	2024	1. divisjon	23	1	–		2	0	–		25	1
Odds BK	2025	1. divisjon	14	1	–		1	0	–		15	1
Odds BK	Total		82	24	0	0	7	1	4	0	93	25
Odds BK 2	2025	4. divisjon	3	0	–		–		–		3	0
Career total			198	50	0	0	13	1	6	0	217	51
