= Kat Jordan =

American soccer player (born 2002)

Personal information
- Full name: Katherine Jordan
- Date of birth: February 25, 2002 (age 24)
- Place of birth: Sarasota, Florida, United States
- Height: 5 ft 8 in (1.73 m)
- Position: Midfielder

Team information
- Current team: Halifax Tides FC
- Number: 10

Youth career
- Tampa Bay United

College career
| Years | Team | Apps | (Gls) |
| 2022–2023 | Columbia Lions | 32 | (10) |
| 2024–2025 | Santa Clara Broncos | 37 | (5) |

Senior career*
| Years | Team | Apps | (Gls) |
- Downtown United SC
| 2026– | Halifax Tides FC | 1 | (0) |
- * Club domestic league appearances and goals as of April 25, 2026

Katherine Jordan (born February 25, 2002) is an American soccer player who plays for Halifax Tides FC in the Northern Super League.

== Early life ==
Born in the United States, she is of Canadian and Czech descent. Jordan played youth soccer with Tampa Bay United. She attended Venice High School and was named the HTPreps Girls Soccer Player of the Year in 2019 and was invited to participate in the ECNL National Training Camp in 2019.

== College career ==
In 2020, Jordan began attending Columbia University, where she played for the women's soccer team. After the 2020 season was cancelled due to the COVID-19 pandemic, she did not play in 2021 either, instead debuting in 2022. She scored her first goal on October 8, 2022 against the Penn Quakers. On September 7, 2023, she scored both goals in a 2-0 victory over the Fordham Rams. At the end of October 2023, she was named the Ivy League Offensive Player of the Week. In 2023, she was named to the All-Ivy League First Team, the Ivy League All-Tournament Team, the All-East Region Second Team, and won the team's Ali Ahern Award.

In 2024, she transferred to Santa Clara University as a graduate student, joining the women's soccer team. She made her debut on September 15, 2024 against the San Jose State Spartants. She scored her first goal in the next match on August 18 against the California Golden Bears. At the end of the 2024 season, she was named the West Coast Conference Co-Midfielder of the Year. She was named team captain for the 2025 season. She also earned All-WCC Honorable Mention in 2024 and 2025 and WCC All-Academic Honorable Mention in 2025. After graduating, she trained with National Women's Soccer League club Gotham FC during the 2026 pre-season.

== Club career ==
Jordan played with Downtown United SC in the Women's Premier Soccer League.

In February 2026, Jordan signed with Northern Super League club Halifax Tides FC.
