= Ken Pears =

Canadian soccer player (1934–2022)

Personal information
- Full name: Kenneth Pears
- Date of birth: 12 April 1934
- Place of birth: Vancouver, British Columbia, Canada
- Date of death: 18 December 2022 (aged 88)
- Place of death: Vancouver, British Columbia, Canada
- Height: 1.80 m (5 ft 11 in)
- Position: Goalkeeper

Senior career*
Years	Team	Apps	(Gls)
- Vancouver Capilanos
1951–1954	Westminster Royals FC		
1954–1955	Vancouver Firefighters FC		
1956–1958	Vancouver Hale-Co FC		
1958–1959	Vancouver Firefighters FC		
1959	Westminster Royals FC		
1959–1968	Vancouver Firefighters FC		
1964	→ Vancouver Columbus FC (loan)		
1967	→ Victoria O'Keefe (loan)		
1968	Vancouver Canadian Royals		
1969	Vancouver Spartans		
1969–1970	Vancouver Firefighters FC		

International career
1957	Canada	4	(0)
- * Club domestic league appearances and goals

Kenneth Pears (12 April 1934 – 18 December 2022) was a Canadian soccer goalkeeper. He was a four-time national champion with Westminster Royals FC (1953), Vancouver Hale-Co FC (1956), Vancouver Columbus FC (1964), and Vancouver Firefighters FC (1965). He was Canada's starting goalkeeper during FIFA World Cup Qualifiers in 1957. He is an honoured member of the Canada Soccer Hall of Fame as part of the inaugural class in 2000.

In the Pacific Coast League, Pears won seven championships with three clubs: five times with Firefighters (1954–55, 1961–62, 1963–64, 1964–65, 1965–66), once with Westminster Royals FC (1952–53), and once with Hale-Co FC (1958). From 1952 to 1966, he was a British Columbia or Mainland All-Star in 13 of 15 seasons. He notably posted a clean sheet against Tottenham Hotspur in a 2–0 win in Vancouver on 3 June 1957.

Pears was still just 19 years old when he won his first national title with Westminster Royals in 1953. After they lost the 1952 Canadian Final to Montréal Stelco and opposing goalkeeper Bill Gill (footballer), Pears and his teammates faced the same all-star goalkeeper a year later now wearing the Montréal Hakoah colours. This time, Pears posted two clean sheets in three matches as the Royals captured the 1953 Championship. Across eight inter-provincial matches against Edmonton, Winnipeg and Montréal, Pears posted five clean sheets and conceded just three goals, two of which were scored from the penalty spot.

In 1961–62, Pears won the Austin Delany Memorial Trophy as the league's most valuable player. Along with winning the league championship, the Anderson Cup, and the BC Soccer Province Cup, Pears also helped Firefighters FC win the 1962 Pacific Coast International Championship for the J.K. Kennedy Cup.

Pears also played in the 1964 edition of the Pacific Coast International Championship with the Pacific Coast League all-stars, earning MVP honours as the team finished second. He missed the 1966 edition through injury when Firefighters won their second Kennedy Cup; he won the 1967 edition as a backup goalkeeper (on loan) with Victoria O'Keefe.

In 1969, Pears helped Vancouver Spartans win the Western Canada Soccer League championship.

After representing Canada in FIFA World Cup Qualifiers in 1957, he captained Canada's side during a 1960 tour of the Soviet Union and Britain.

Pears was inducted into the British Columbia Sports Hall of Fame in 1986. He died on 18 December 2022, at the age of 88.
