= Pacific Coast Soccer League (1908–1973) =

Pacific Coast Football League / Pacific Coast Soccer League
- Founded: 1908 / 1939 / 1955 / 1959
- Country: Canada
- Confederation: CONCACAF; British Columbia Soccer Association
- Number of clubs: High of 10, Low of 4

The Pacific Coast Soccer League (originally the Pacific Coast Association Football League and later the Pacific Coast Football League) was an amateur and briefly semi-professional soccer league in Canada. The league had several incarnations from 1908 to 1973 before it merged with the Mainland Senior Soccer League and the Intercity Junior League after the 1972–73 season to form the British Columbia Senior Soccer League (which later became the Vancouver Metro Soccer League). While the league predominantly featured teams from Vancouver's mainland and Vancouver Island, it also featured a team from Seattle, United States for two years.

In the 1950s, the Pacific Coast League was regarded as the best league in Canada. On June 22, 1957, Canada's national team featured an all-Pacific Coast League starting lineup for their first-ever match in FIFA World Cup Qualifiers. In the 1960s, the Pacific Coast League was one of four major leagues in Canadian soccer alongside the Western Canada Soccer League, the National Soccer League of Ontario/Quebec, and the Eastern Canada Professional Soccer League.

More than 20 years after the last Pacific Coast League merged with other leagues in 1973, a new Pacific Coast Soccer League was established in 1995.

== Early leagues ==
The name Pacific Coast Association Football League appears to have been chosen as the railway age had yet to mature to the point where rail travel superseded the steamships traversing the Pacific Coast of the United States and Canada. The leagues for various sports of the highest level such as baseball in the summer; therefore, spanned along the Pacific Coast from California to British Columbia not inland.

The original Pacific Coast Association Football (Soccer) League was formed on July 25, 1908 in Victoria at the Drlard Hotel. Executives elected were Con Jones, president and Will Ellis, secretary-treasurer both from Vancouver and R. Heindmarch of Ladysmith as vice president. A constitution was adopted modeled after the English and Scottish league associations along with a 19-game schedule of matches from September 13, 1908 to January 23, 1909.

One recognizes the constitution’s contents from current leagues. Annual league subscriptions were set at $10 and five percent of gate receipts while player registration was 10 cents per player. The league champion was to be awarded a $100 silver trophy provided by Con Jones. Membership was limited to the larger clubs present at the meeting, including a team from each of Nanaimo, Victoria, and Ladysmith of the Vancouver Island Football League, Vancouver of the Mainland League and Seattle.

The idea promulgated was to have a series of games, following the league principle of each team playing the others home and away, in an international league between teams in the already existing leagues to add prestige to the sport and generate larger attendances. Individual exhibitions between various international sides such as that between Ladysmith of the Vancouver Island League and Seattle of the Puget Sound League in the “Sound City" at Woodland Park on February 25, 1907 drew one of the largest crowds of the Seattle season with over 2,000 spectators. The four home and four away PCSL games for the Pacific Northwest championship were to be played in addition to their regular league schedules.

There was controversy from the start from playing on Sundays (against some local laws) to the feeling the new PCSL was calculated to exclude other communities or clubs within each community from contesting the champion of the Pacific Northwest. An alternate idea was to formalize determining Island and Mainland champions, having them playoff for the British Columbia championship, and then against the Washington state champion to crown the champion of the Pacific Northwest. The promoters of the league wanted to follow the example of baseball and eventually expand the league from California to British Columbia. It was thought by others that four coincident leagues at the same time would dilute talent and enthusiasm for all competitions detrimentally affecting a city’s results in the Island, provincial, and international competitions. Victoria and some other communities had local community leagues, the existing regional league, and a provincial league competition in addition to the new international league. Some of the existing leagues had multiple divisions and field access was a concern.

There were conflicts when PCSL matches were rescheduled, postponing or bumping the other competitions, so that a representative side from local teams could play the PCSL game. The amount of soccer being played is especially notable when one keeps in mind that the same athletes often competed in baseball, boxing, rugby, basketball, lacrosse, and other pursuits in addition to soccer. The PCSL also appears to have motivated the Victoria and District Football Association to begin paying referees. Payment for players and officials was controversial at this time as the amateur and professional question/schism was being debated in most athletic clubs.

The British Colonist calls some of these aggregations of local sides competing in the PCSL: Victoria United, Nanaimo United, and Vancouver United while smaller community teams are referred to by the community name. Locals would also recognize some names of grounds for various sports currently in use today such as Royal Athletic Park. In the spring of 1909 an aggregation of the strongest California players from San Francisco did a tour playing each of the PCSL teams in a bid to get Oregonian and Californian participation in the PCSL. Funds from spectators do not appear to have covered the transportation costs of the travel required for the PCSL.

Victoria West played Seattle in the last PCSL match during February 1909 in a make-up game after Victoria failed to send a team January 10, 1909. Nanaimo won the 1909 PCSL championship. On March 7, 1909 the league had their annual general meeting in Seattle deciding to change the season to March 6, 1910 - June 4, 1910 and not accepting a proposal for professionalism. The moves appear to have been made to alleviate most of the conflicts over fields, players, and officials. Teams from Everett, Westminster, and Tacoma were added to the proposed schedule as well as hopes that a team from Portland, Oregon could be added to the schedule. Momentum for the league does not appear to have been maintained and the league folded.

A second Pacific Coast Football League was formed on June 15, 1925 with C.G. Callin as president and Tommy Chrisite as secretary. On June 26, 1926 an all-star team from the PCFL played an English F.A. touring team in Vancouver. But the league folded again 1927.

== Pacific Coast Leagues from 1930–31 to 1972–73 ==
A third Pacific Coast Football League was formed on August 30, 1930 with Archie Sinclair as president and Vic Sortwell as secretary-treasurer. On September 19, 1930 the first annual meeting was held and James Corral was named president and Robert Davidson, secretary-treasurer. The original four teams were Vancouver St. Andrews, Vancouver St. Saviours, New Westminster Royals, and a fourth team from Nanaimo. The third version of the PCFL stumbled through the 1930s, before being re-formed in August 1939 with Tommy Nelson as president and Jock Hendry as secretary.

A few months after starting the 1955-56 season, the eight-team league canceled the remainder of its schedule and disbanded in February 1956 so that it could initiate a summer schedule in the newly-named Pacific Coast Summer Soccer League. There were five teams in the summer league which played from May to September, while other leagues and teams in British Columbia continued to play a traditional schedule from the Fall through Spring. The summer schedule lasted four seasons (with four to six teams) until the league plotted a new semi-professional format to ensure greater control over players (who were sometimes playing in multiple leagues to take advantage of both schedules). The last summer season was cut short at the end of July 1959 (with a league champion already crowned) and the new semi-pro circuit kicked off in September. A few months into that 1959-60 season, the BC Soccer Commission ordered the league to again be registered as an amateur league, which caused some teams to lose sponsors (although those teams found new sponsors in the 1960s).

From 1942-43 to 1949-50, the league format featured a First Half and Second Half, with each section's winner meeting in the championship match (unless the same team finished first in both halves of the schedule). The league often had to reschedule matches on account of changing weather in the winter months and sometimes canceled matches after first place was clinched. The league also sometimes, but not always, featured a promotion/relegation series at the end of the season. The league featured a single schedule in 1950-51, 1952-53 and 1953-54 (as well as the canceled 1955-56 season and shortened 1959 summer season). The league again featured the First Half / Second Half format in 1951-52, from 1954-55 through 1958, and from 1959-60 to 1961-62. Then from 1962-63 to 1972-73, the league featured a single schedule with playoffs for the Top Star Trophy.

In 1972-73, the regular season featured an inter-locking schedule between the seven Pacific Coast League teams and the six Inter-City League teams, with matches between teams from the two separate leagues counting towards their respective standings. At year's end, the teams from both leagues were part of a merger that helped establish the new British Columbia Senior Soccer League.

== Pacific Coast League champions ==
From 1939–40 to 1972–73, North Vancouver's North Shore club (North Shore United / Carling's) won six championships. Over the course of 34 years, three clubs won back-to-back-to-back titles: St. Andrews FC from 1945–46 to 1947–48, Firefighters FC from 1963–64 to 1965–66, and Columbus FC from 1968–69 to 1970–71. The most successful players with seven championships each were Johnny Newbold, Art Hughes and Ken Pears.

=== Champions ===
1939–1962 seasons
Year	Champions
1939–40	North Shore United FC
1940–41	Vancouver St. Andrews FC
1941–42	North Shore United FC
1942–43	North Shore United FC
1943–44	Vancouver Boeing FC
1944–45	Vancouver St. Saviours (City FC)
1945–46	Vancouver St. Andrews FC
1946–47	Vancouver St. Andrews FC
1947–48	Vancouver St. Andrews FC
1948–49	North Shore United FC
1949–50	Vancouver St. Andrews FC
1950–51	North Shore United FC
1951–52	Victoria United FC
1952–53	New Westminster Royals FC
1953–54	Vancouver City FC
1954–55	Vancouver Firefighters FC
1956	Westminster Royals FC
1957	Westminster Royals FC
1958	Vancouver Hale-Co (City FC)
1959	Westminster Royals FC
1959–60	North Shore United (Carling's)
1960–61	Westminster Royals FC
1961–62	Vancouver Firefighters FC

1962–1973 seasons
Year	Playoff champions Top Star Trophy	Playoff runners-up	Regular season champions
1962–63	Vancouver Firefighters FC	Vancouver Columbus FC	Vancouver Canadians (City FC)
1963–64	Vancouver Firefighters FC	Vancouver Columbus FC	Vancouver Firefighters FC
1964–65	Vancouver Columbus FC	Vancouver Canadians (City FC)	Vancouver Firefighters FC
1965–66	Vancouver Columbus FC	Victoria United FC	Vancouver Firefighters FC
1966–67	North Shore United (Luckies)	Vancouver Columbus FC	Victoria O'Keefe FC
1967–68	Vancouver Firefighters FC	Vancouver Columbus FC	Victoria O'Keefe FC
1968–69	Vancouver Columbus FC	Vancouver Firefighters FC	Vancouver Columbus FC
1969–70	Vancouver Columbus FC	Victoria O'Keefe FC	Vancouver Columbus FC
1970–71	Croatia SC Vancouver	Vancouver Columbus FC	Vancouver Columbus FC
1971–72	Victoria West United FC	Vancouver Paul's Tailors FC	Victoria West United FC
1972–73	Westminster Blues SC	Victoria Gorge FC	Westminster Blues SC

=== Titles ===
Team	Playoff championships		Regular season championships		Total championships
Team	Titles	Years	Titles	Years	Total championships
Vancouver Firefighters FC	3	1962-63, 1963-64, 1967-68	5	1954-55, 1961-62, 1963-64, 1964-65, 1965-66	8
Vancouver Columbus FC	4	1964-65, 1965-66, 1968-69, 1969-70	3	1968-69, 1969-70, 1970-71	7
North Shore United FC / North Shore Carling's / North Shore Luckies	1	1966-67	6	1939-40, 1941-42, 1942-43, 1948-49, 1950-51, 1959-60	7
Victoria United FC / Victoria O'Keefe FC / Victoria West United FC	1	1971-72	4	1951-52, 1966-67, 1967-68, 1971-72	5
Vancouver St. Andrews FC	0		5	1940-41, 1945-46, 1946-47, 1947-48, 1949-50	5
Westminster Royals FC	0		5	1952-53, 1956, 1957, 1959, 1960-61	5
Vancouver St. Saviours / Vancouver City FC / Vancouver Hale-Co FC / Molson Canadians	0		4	1944-45, 1953-54, 1958, 1962-63	4
Westminster Blues SC	1	1972-73	1	1972-73	2
Croatia SC Vancouver	1	1970-71	0		1
Vancouver Boeing FC	0		1	1943-44	1

== Other competitions ==
Teams from the Pacific Coast Soccer League played in cup competitions, most notably Canada Soccer's The Challenge Trophy and BC Soccer's The Province Cup (alongside British Columbia teams from other leagues). From 1922 to 1960, there was one provincial competition that qualified a team to the national competition plus a separate provincial competition organised by the BC Soccer Commission that played for the Province Cup. Starting in 1961, the two competitions were unified, with the winner of the Province Cup regularly qualifying for Canada Soccer's National Championships.

From 1915 until at least 1947, mainland teams competed for the Mainland Cup (also alongside teams from other leagues). From 1943-44 to 1965-66, Pacific Coast League teams played for the Anderson Cup (sometimes over the Christmas break), with proceeds benefiting an injured players' fund. From 1957 to 1960, Pacific Coast League teams played for the Shrine Cup, with proceeds benefiting youth soccer.

From 1961 to 1967, winners of the league usually qualified for the Pacific Coast International Championship featuring teams for Canada, United States, and Mexico. Winners of this international competition won the J.F. Kennedy Cup. Canadian teams won the competition in 1962 (Vancouver Firefighters FC), 1966 (Firefighters FC) and 1967 (Victoria O'Keefe).

Starting in 1969-70, there was a PCL Inter-League Cup competition that was played during the season separate from the Pacific Coast League standings.

== Pacific Coast League teams from 1939-40 to 1972-73 ==
Many teams changed their names over the course of the league history, with notably the use of sponsor names starting in the 1950s. Only each team's Pacific Coast League seasons are listed as many teams played in other leagues during their existence.

- Croatia SC Vancouver (1968-69 to 1970-71)
- Eintracht Vancouver SC (1968-69 to 1970-71)
- Nanaimo City FC (1940-41, 1946-47, 1947-48, 1949-50, 1958)
- North Shore United FC (Reds 1939-40 to 1955-56) / Airco (1956) / North Shore (1957) / North Shore Carling's (1958 to 1961-62) / North Shore (1962-63 and 1963-64) / North Shore Luckies (1964-65 to 1968-69) / North Shore Friuli (1969-70 and 1970-71) / North Shore (1971-72 and 1972-73)
- Seattle Hungarians (1962-63 and 1963-64)
- University of British Columbia (Thunderbirds 1964-65 to 1972-73)
- Vancouver Boeing FC (1942-43 to 1944-45)
- Vancouver Columbus FC (1959-60 to 1970-71)
- Vancouver Firefighters FC (1951-52 to 1955-56 and 1961-62 to 1971-72)
- Vancouver Hungaria (Hungarians 1958) / Vancouver Continentals (1958, 1959, 1959-60) / Hungarians (1959-60)
- Vancouver Inter-Italia FC (1971-72 and 1972-73)
- Vancouver Kerrisdale (1941-42, 1945-46 and 1946-47)
- Vancouver Pilseners FC (1955-56) / Wallace Pilsener FC (1962-63) / Burnaby Wallace (1963-64)
- Vancouver Radials FC (1939-40 to 1941-42)
- Vancouver St. Andrews FC (Scots, 1939-40 to 1958) / Vancouver Labatt's FC (1959 and 1959-60) / Vancouver St. Andrews (1960-61 to 1966-67)
- Vancouver St. Saviours (Saints from 1939-40 to 1947-48) / Vancouver City FC (1947-48 to 1954-55) / Vancouver Hale-Co FC (1955-56 to 1959-60) / Vancouver City FC (1959-60 and 1960-61) / Molson Canadian (1961-62 to 1964-65) / Burnaby Villa (1965-66 to 1968-69) / Vancouver Paul's Tailors (1969-70 to 1972-73)
- Victoria City FC (1954-55)
- Victoria Evoce (1959)
- Victoria Gorge FC (1971-72 and 1972-73)
- Victoria Strathcona (1955-56)
- Victoria United FC (Victoria FC 1929-40) / Victoria United FC (1940-41 to 1953-54, 1956 and 1961-62 to 1965-66) / Victoria O'Keefe (1966-67 to 1969-70) / Victoria United FC (1970-71) / Victoria West United (1971-72 and 1972-73)
- Westminster Blues SC (Westminster Royals FC 1963-64 to 1966-67) / Westminster Labatt's (1967-68 and 1968-69) / Westminster Blues SC (1969-70 to 1972-73)
- Westminster Royal City FC (1962-63)
- Westminster Royals FC (1948-49 to 1962-63)

== Awards ==
- Austin Delany Memorial Trophy (Most Valuable Player)
- Airco Trophy (top scorer)

== Notable players ==
Thirty-six players from the Pacific Coast Soccer League (1939-40 to 1972-73) have since been inducted in the Canada Soccer Hall of Fame as honoured players.

- Frank Ambler (1940-41 to 1955-56)
- Garry Ayre (1971-72)
- Eddie Bak (1956 to 1968–69)
- Jim Blundell (1957 to 1968–69)
- Bob Bolitho (1969–70 to 1972–73)
- Roy Cairns (1947–48 to 1960–61)
- Tony Chursky (1970–71)
- Jack Cowan (1947–48 to 1948–49 and 1954–55 to 1956)
- Errol Crossan (1951–52 to 1953–54 and 1961–62 to 1968–69)
- Ernie Edmunds (1940–41)
- Neil Ellett (1961–62 to 1971–72)
- Doug Greig (1946–47 to 1962–63)
- Trevor Harvey (1939-40 to 1953-54)
- Art Hughes (1950–51 to 1959 and 1961–62 to 1966–67)
- Gordie Ion (1951–52 to 1962–63)
- Glen Johnson (1967–68 and 1968–69)
- Victor Kodelja (1968–69 to 1970–71)
- Bob Lenarduzzi (1970–71)
- Sam Lenarduzzi (1965–66 to 1970–71)
- Don Matheson (1939–40 to 1954–55)
- Normie McLeod (1954–55 to 1959, 1961–62 to 1966–67, 1968–69 and 1971–72)
- Bobby Newbold (1939–40 to 1953–54)
- Buzz Parsons (1968–69 to 1970–71)
- Ken Pears (1951–52 to 1958 and 1961–62 to 1969–70)
- Brian Philley (1942–43 to 1962–63)
- Pat Philley (1948–49 to 1958)
- Brian Robinson (1969–70 to 1971–72)
- Bobby Smith (1958 to 1971–72)
- Jimmy Spencer (1939–40 to 1955–56)
- Gary Stevens (1961–62 to 1970–71)
- Gogie Stewart (1947–48 to 1964–65)
- David Stothard (1955–56 to 1966-67)
- Gino Vazzoler (1961–62 to 1970-71)
- Jack Whent (1939–40, 1942–43, 1946–47, 1953–54 to 1954–55)
- Fred Whittaker (1940–41 to 1945–46 and 1947–48 to 1955–56)
- Bruce Wilson (1970–71 and 1971–72)
