= Dave Turner (soccer, born 1903) =

Canadian soccer player (1934–2022)

Personal information
- Full name: Dave Binnie Turner
- Date of birth: 11 October 1903
- Place of birth: Edinburgh, Scotland
- Date of death: 6 April 1989 (aged 85)
- Place of death: Victoria, British Columbia, Canada
- Height: 1.73 m (5 ft 8 in)
- Position: Inside left

Senior career*
Years	Team	Apps	(Gls)
- Edmonton South Side
1923	Calgary CPR		
1923-24	Cumberland		
1924	Edmonton South Side		
1924-25	Vancouver St. Andrews FC		
1925-26	New Bedford Whalers		
1925-26	Philadelphia Field Club		
1926-1927	Toronto Ulster United FC		
1927-1939	Westminster Royals FC		

International career
1927	Canada	3	(1)
- * Club domestic league appearances and goals

Dave Turner (11 October 1903 – 6 April 1989) was a Canadian soccer player from the 1920s and 1930s. He was a four-time Dominion of Canada Football Championship winner with the Westminster Royals FC, and represented Canada on their 1927 tour to New Zealand. He was honoured by Canada's Sports Hall of Fame as part of their inaugural class in 1955 and then posthumously honoured by the Canada Soccer Hall of Fame as part of the inaugural class in 2000.

He helped the Royals become the first Canadian team to win the Challenge Trophy four times (1928, 1930, 1931, 1936).

Turner was inducted into the British Columbia Sports Hall of Fame in 1966. He died on 6 April 1989, at the age of 85.
