= Bobby Smith (Canadian soccer) =

Canadian soccer player

Personal information
- Full name: Robert Smith
- Date of birth: 30 November 1940 (age 85)
- Place of birth: Vancouver, British Columbia, Canada
- Height: 1.83 m (6 ft 0 in)
- Position: Outside left

Senior career*
Years	Team	Apps	(Gls)
1958	Nanaimo City FC		
1959-1962	North Shore Carling's		
1962-1969	Vancouver Columbus FC		
1965, 1966	→ Vancouver Firefighters FC (loan)		
1967	→ Victoria O'Keefe (loan)		
1969-1970	Vancouver Firefighters FC		
1970	Vancouver Columbus FC		
1970-1972	North Shore Friuli		
- * Club domestic league appearances and goals

Bobby Smith (born 30 November 1940) is a former Canadian soccer player. He was an outside left, most notably with Vancouver Columbus FC with whom he played in the 1968 Canadian final. He is an honoured member of the Canada Soccer Hall of Fame.

In the Pacific Coast League, Smith won league championships titles with North Shore United (1959–60) and Columbus FC (1969-70). He was a British Columbia All-Star five times in an eight-year span from 1960 to 1967.

He was one of only three players that scored more than 150 goals in the Pacific Coast League from 1939–40 to 1972–73, setting the league record with 160 goals from 1958 to 1972. He was the league's top scorer through the 1960s with 132 goals scored. He also led the league in scoring three times (1959–60, 1964–65, 1967–68). In 1959–60, he won the Ed Bayley Trophy as BC Soccer's most outstanding player in his first year in senior soccer after beating Les Fabri in the scoring race.

Smith was still a teenager when he made his Pacific Coast League on 26 May 1958 with Nanaimo City FC under player-manager Gogie Stewart. He scored his first goal on 3 September and then added two more goals on 14 September in a Nanaimo victory that postponed North Shore from clinching first place in the season's second half.

On loan, he helped both Firefighters FC (1966) and Victoria O'Keefe (1967) win the Pacific Coast International Championship for the J.F. Kennedy Trophy. In the 1966 final, he scored a record five goals as Firefighters won 6–0 over the Los Angeles Selects.

In 1968, he helped Columbus FC reach the Canadian final, scoring his team's lone goal in a 2:1 loss to the Toronto Royals on 29 September in Toronto. Two weeks earlier in the western final, Smith had scored both goals in Columbus FC's 2:1 come-from-behind win over Winnipeg Internationals at Callister Park in Vancouver.

In 2019, he was inducted to the Canada Soccer Hall of Fame as part of a group of Past Canadian Players from the 1940s, 1950s and 1960s.

== Personal life ==
Bobby's father Hap Smith was a multi-sport athlete who played soccer and lacrosse. Hap was an all-star soccer player and Dominion of Canada Championship winner with Vancouver Radials. His brother Barry Smith was a multi-sport athlete who played soccer, football and softball.
