= Art Hughes (Canadian soccer) =

Canadian soccer player (1930–2019)

Personal information
- Date of birth: October 1, 1930
- Place of birth: Camrose, Alberta, Canada
- Date of death: March 4, 2019 (aged 88)
- Place of death: Vancouver, British Columbia, Canada
- Height: 1.83 m (6 ft 0 in)
- Position: Centre forward

Youth career
- Vancouver Marpoles Universals

Senior career*
Years	Team	Apps	(Gls)
1950–1951	Westminster Royals FC		
1950–1951	Vancouver St. Andrews FC		
1951–1956	Vancouver Firefighters FC		
1956–1958	Vancouver Hale-Co FC		
1958–1959	Vancouver Firefighters FC		
1959	Westminster Royals FC		
1959–1967	Vancouver Firefighters FC		

International career
1957	Canada	4	(2)

Managerial career
- 1968–1969: Vancouver Firefighters
- * Club domestic league appearances and goals

Arthur Hughes (October 1, 1930 – March 4, 2019) was a Canadian soccer player. He was a two-time national champion with Canadian clubs Vancouver Hale-Co FC (1956) and Vancouver Firefighters FC (1965). He was also Canada's starting centre-forward during the FIFA World Cup Qualifiers in 1957. In the Pacific Coast League, Hughes won seven championships with three different teams from 1954–55 to 1965–66. He won five titles with Firefighters (1954–55, 1961–62, 1963–64, 1964–65, 1965–66), one with Hale-Co FC (1958), and one with Westminster Royals FC (1959). He was a British Columbia or Mainland All-Star in 11 seasons from 1951 to 1965. Along with winning two Dominion titles, he won three runner-up medals with Vancouver St. Andrews (1951), Westminster (1959), and Firefighters (1961). He was an honored member of the Canada Soccer Hall of Fame.

== Early life ==
Hughes was born on 1 October 1930 in Camrose, Alberta. His family moved to Vancouver.

== Club career ==
After playing youth soccer for Marpoles, he joined New Westminster Royals FC and scored two goals in his Pacific Coast League debut as a teenager on September 17, 1950. He split that rookie season between the Royals and Vancouver St. Andrews FC, leading the league with 15 goals scored.

Along with 1950–51, Hughes also led the league in goalscoring in 1956, 1957, and 1959. He was the first-ever winner of the Austin Delany Memorial Trophy as the league's most valuable player in 1959.

Hughes also played in the Mainland Soccer League and won the 1960–61 championship with Firefighters FC. He retired at the end of the season at age 30, but was convinced to return to Firefighters late in the 1961–62 season who were by then back in the Pacific Coast League and en route to winning another championship. He remained active through to the 1966–67 season and retired as the Pacific Coast League's all-time scoring leader with 158 goals (two more than Fred Whittaker).

Hughes played and scored in three editions of the Pacific Coast International Championship, twice with the Vancouver Firefighters FC (1962, 1965) and once with the Pacific Coast League all-stars (1964). Hughes and the Firefighters won the 1962 J.F. Kennedy Trophy.

Upon retiring Hughes became the assistant chief in the Vancouver Fire Department.

== International career ==
After missing a chance to play for Canada in 1956 through injury, Hughes was selected to play for Canada in 1957 for FIFA World Cup Qualifiers. He scored two goals in Canada's first competitive match on 22 June 1957. After representing Canada in FIFA World Cup Qualifiers in 1957, he captained Canada's side during a 1960 tour of the Soviet Union and Britain.

== Managerial career ==
After his playing career, Hughes served as Firefighters FC manager for one season, helping the club finish third in the 1968-69 Pacific Coast League standings.

== Personal life and death ==
Hughes was married to his wife Marlene Hughes with whom he raised two daughters. He died in Vancouver on 4 March 2019 at the age of 88.

== Honours ==
=== Club ===
Vancouver Firefighters FC

- Canada Soccer Championship for The Challenge Trophy: 1965
- Pacific Coast League: 1954–55, 1961–62, 1963–64, 1964–65, 1965–66
- Pacific Coast International Championship for the J.F. Kennedy Trophy: 1962

Vancouver Hale-Co FC (Vancouver City)

- Canada Soccer Championship for The Challenge Trophy (Carling's Red Cap Trophy): 1956
- Pacific Coast League: 1958

Westminster Royals FC

- Pacific Coast League: 1959

=== Individual ===
- Austin Delany Memorial Trophy (PCSL Most Valuable Player): 1959
- Top Scorer of the Pacific Coast Soccer League (4): 1950–51, 1956, 1957, 1959
- Top Scorer of the Canada Soccer Championship for the Challenge Trophy: 1965
