= Canada Soccer Hall of Fame =

- Established: 1997; 29 years ago
- Location: Ottawa, Ontario, Canada
- Coordinates: 45°25′29″N 75°41′42″W
- Type: Sports museum
- Owner: Canadian Soccer Association
- Website: canadasoccer.com/halloffame

The Canada Soccer Hall of Fame honours people and institutions for their contributions to Canadian soccer. It was founded in 1997 by the Ontario Soccer Association and was originally located in Vaughan, Ontario. As of 2024, the Canada Soccer Hall of Fame has inducted 144 players, 13 managers/coaches, 10 officials, and 45 builders as honoured members. Additionally, the Canada Soccer Hall of Fame has recognized 18 teams of distinction and 21 organizations of distinction.

After the Canadian Soccer Association Alumni Association was founded in 1987, the Soccer Hall of Fame was founded by the Ontario Soccer Association in 1997 in Vaughan. The new Canada Soccer Hall of Fame was launched in May 2017 under the direction of the Canadian Soccer Association in Ottawa, Ontario. All previously-inducted members of The Soccer Hall of Fame as well as a catch-up class of 17 legends were named to the new Canada Soccer Hall of Fame.

== Honoured members ==
As of 2024, the Canada Soccer Hall of Fame has honoured 212 honoured members. The honoured members are organized in the following categories: Modern Canadian Players (62), Past Players (82), Coaches/Managers (13), Referees (10), and Builders (45). The next class of honoured members will be inducted in 2025.

Since 2022, the Modern Canadian Players category has featured an equal balance of past Men's National Team Players and Women's National Team Players. As noted by the Canada Soccer Hall of Fame, "this balance reflects the modern era during which international football at the very highest level has both a men’s and women’s FIFA World Cup as the pinnacle of the sport (since the inauguration of the FIFA Women’s World Cup in 1991)."

Names in italics are those persons inducted under the "Pioneer" category (established in 2007) or "Veteran Canadian Players" category (as the category was renamed in 2017).

=== Modern Canadian Players ===
- Patrice Bernier: 2022
- Sue Brand: 2021
- Jim Brennan: 2015
- Ian Bridge: 2003
- Alex Bunbury: 2006
- Silvana Burtini: 2010
- Connie Cant: 2007
- Annie Caron: 2021
- John Catliff: 2004
- Candace Chapman: 2018
- Carla Chin Baker: 2021
- Carlo Corazzin: 2012
- Nick Dasovic: 2011
- Tracy David: 2003
- Dwayne De Rosario: 2024
- Jason deVos: 2013

- Paul Dolan: 2004
- Geri Donnelly: 2014
- Craig Forrest: 2007
- Martina Franko: 2022
- Robyn Gayle: 2024
- Gerry Gray: 2001
- Richard Hastings: 2023
- Janine Helland: 2013
- Randee Hermus: 2019
- Charmaine Hooper: 2012
- Lyndon Hooper: 2011
- Angela Kelly: 2004
- Kara Lang: 2015
- Karina LeBlanc: 2020
- Janet Lemieux: 2021
- John Limniatis: 2009

- Joan McEachern: 2009
- Kevin McKenna: 2019
- Colin Miller: 2005
- Dale Mitchell: 2002
- Domenic Mobilio: 2007
- Luce Mongrain: 2021
- Terry Moore: 2005
- Isabelle Morneau: 2014
- Carmelina Moscato: 2023
- Suzanne Muir: 2021
- Andrea Neil: 2012
- Pat Onstad: 2015
- Paul Peschisolido: 2013
- Tomasz Radzinski: 2018
- Randy Ragan: 2002

- Michelle Ring-Passant: 2005
- Cathy Ross: 2021
- Randy Samuel: 2006
- Branko Segota: 2002
- Carrie Serwetnyk: 2001
- Sue Simon: 2021
- Paul Stalteri: 2017
- Helen Stoumbos: 2008
- Mike Sweeney: 2002
- Brittany Timko Baxter: 2020
- Carl Valentine: 2003
- Amy Walsh: 2017
- Mark Watson: 2012
- Rhian Wilkinson: 2022
- Frank Yallop: 2005

=== Past Players (1880s - 1980s) ===
- Frank Ambler: 2019
- George Anderson: 2015
- Dick Arends: 2000
- Garry Ayre: 2005
- Eddie Bak: 2019
- Jim Blundell: 2019
- Bob Bolitho: 2004
- Walter Bowman: 2008
- Jack Brand: 2008
- Buster Cairns: 2001
- Geordie Campbell: 2000
- Roland Castonguay: 2013
- Paul-Émile Castonguay: 2013
- Marcel Castonguay: 2013
- Sam Chedgzoy: 2005
- Tony Chursky: 2004
- Joe Clulow: 2017
- Jock Coulter: 2017
- Jack Cowan: 2000
- Errol Crossan: 2000
- Eddie Derby: 2017

- Fred Dierden: 2017
- Jimmy Douglas: 2001
- Ernie Edmunds: 2017
- Neil Ellett: 2009
- Bill Findler: 2007
- Larry Fitzpatrick: 2017
- Bill Gill: 2019
- George Graham: 2017
- Doug Greig: 2002
- Art Halliwell: 2001
- Bob Harley: 2003
- Trevor Harvey: 2004
- Art Hughes: 2001
- Robert Iarusci: 2000
- Gordie Ion: 2010
- Glen Johnson: 2007
- Joe Kennaway: 2000
- Victor Kodelja: 2011
- Bobby Lavery: 2017
- Bob Lenarduzzi: 2001
- Sam Lenarduzzi: 2000

- Tino Lettieri: 2001
- Eddie MacLaine: 2017
- Harry Manson: 2014
- Carmine Marcantonio: 2014
- Don Matheson: 2019
- Bill Matthews: 2017
- Robert McDonald: 2000
- John McGrane: 2008
- Normie McLeod: 2005
- Wes McLeod: 2005
- Doug McMahon: 2002
- Jimmy Moir: 2017
- Jimmy Nelson: 2017
- Bobby Newbold: 2019
- Jimmy Nicholl: 2011
- Buzz Parsons: 2003
- Ken Pears: 2000
- Brian Philley: 2003
- Pat Philley: 2004
- Harry Phillips: 2019

- Brian Robinson: 2006
- John Schepers: 2019
- Alec Smith: 2017
- Bobby Smith: 2019
- Jimmy Spencer: 2003
- Andy Stevens: 2017
- Mike Stojanovic: 2009
- Gary Stevens: 2019
- Gogie Stewart: 2004
- Dickie Stobbart: 2002
- David Stothard: 2006
- Albert Thombs: 2017
- Walter Thomson: 2010
- David Turner: 2000
- Gino Vazzoler: 2019
- Stan Wakelyn: 2017
- Jack Whent: 2019
- Fred Whittaker: 2002
- Bruce Wilson: 2000
- Artie Woutersz: 2017

=== Coaches - Managers ===
- Jimmie Adam: 2008
- Bob Bearpark: 2006
- Sylvie Béliveau: 2006
- Chris Bennett: 2014

- Stuart Brown: 2010
- John Buchanan: 2006
- Bert Goldberger: 2011

- Dick Howard: 2002
- Don Petrie: 2000
- Ted Slade: 2009

- Bill Thomson: 2007
- Bruce Twamley: 2008
- Tony Waiters: 2001

=== Referees ===
- Gord Arrowsmith: 2012
- Sonia Denoncourt: 2005
- Tony Evangelista: 2003

- Dan Kulai: 2004
- Horace Lyons: 2000
- Ray Morgan: 2002

- Bob Sawtell: 2009
- Dino Soupliotis: 2008
- Héctor Vergara: 2014

- Werner Winsemann: 2000

=== Builders ===
- George Anderson: 2000
- Arther "Pop" Arnold: 2008
- Brian Avey: 2010
- Angus Barrett: 2012
- Herb Capozzi: 2007
- Jeff Cross: 2004
- Sam Davidson: 2000
- Sam Donaghey: 2023
- Gus Etchegarry: 2007
- William Fenton: 2008
- Jim Fleming: 2007

- David Forsyth: 2000
- Tomas Fried: 2000
- Dave Fryatt: 2000
- Bill Gilhespy: 2013
- Rudy Gittens: 2007
- George Gross: 2006
- William Hoyle: 2011
- Jim Hubay: 2015
- Alex Hylan: 2013
- Colin Jose: 2009

- John Kerr, Sr.: 2015
- Eric King: 2002
- Graham Leggat: 2001
- John McMahon: 2001
- Luigi Moro: 2000
- Kevin Muldoon: 2013
- Christine O'Connor: 2024
- Len Peto: 2011
- Pat Quinn: 2004
- Terry Quinn: 2019
- John Richardson: 2012
- Tom Robertson: 2007

- John Russell: 2010
- Aubrey Sanford: 2003
- Bob Sayer: 2020
- Georges Schwartz: 2005
- William Simpson: 2000
- Leeta Sokalski: 2024
- Alan Southard : 2003
- Frederick Stambrook: 2006
- Steve Stavro: 2005
- William Stirling: 2000
- Les Wilson: 2008
- Derek Wisdom: 2009

== Teams and organisations of distinction ==
=== Teams of Distinction ===
- 1888 Canadian men's team: 2003
- 1904 Galt Football Club: 2004
- 1907 Calgary Caledonians: 2007
- 1924 Canadian men's team: 2008
- 1928 Westminster Royals: 2005
- 1933 Toronto Scottish – 2006
- 1976 Toronto Metros-Croatia: 2010
- 1979 Vancouver Whitecaps: 2011
- 1984 Canadian Olympic men's team: 2013

- 1986 Canadian FIFA World Cup men's team: 2009
- 1989 Canadian Francophone Games men's team: 2012
- 1995 Canadian Women's World Cup team: 2019
- 1998 Canadian Concacaf Championship women's team: 2015
- 2000 Canadian Gold Cup Champion men's team: 2014
- 2010 Canadian Concacaf Championship women's team: 2023
- 2012 Canadian Olympic Bronze Medal women's team: 2023
- 2016 Canadian Olympic Bronze Medal women's team: 2023
- 2021 Canadian Olympic Gold Medal women's team

=== Organisations of Distinction ===
==== British Columbia ====
- North Shore United FC: 2023
- Vancouver Columbus F.C.: 2013
- Vancouver Firefighters: 2010
- Vancouver St. Andrews FC: 2019
- Victoria West: 2012

==== Alberta ====
- Calgary Callies FC: 2019
- Edmonton Angels Scottish SC: 2014
- Edmonton Ital Canadian SC: 2023
- Edmonton Scottish SC: 2019

==== Manitoba ====
- Winnipeg United Weston FC: 2019

==== Ontario ====
- CNSC Windsor Croatia: 2023
- Darlington SC: 2019
- Robbie International Youth Tournament: 2014
- Toronto Scottish FC: 2019
- Toronto Ulster United FC: 2011
- West Indies United Toronto: 2023

==== Québec ====
- Lakeshore SC: 2023
- Montréal Carsteel FC: 2015

==== Newfoundland and Labrador ====
- Feildians AA of St. John's: 2023
- Holy Cross FC: 2019
- St. Lawrence Laurentians: 2019

== Past Awards ==
=== Brian Budd Award ===
The Soccer Hall of Fame managed the Brian Budd Award from 2010 to 2014, but the award has since been managed as part of the overall Canada Soccer Awards program. The Brian Budd Award honours outstanding individuals "who have excelled both in soccer and in another endeavour, be it in sport or public life. The individual must exemplify good character, accomplishments, dedication and provide inspiration to present and future generations".

== Provincial Soccer Halls of Fame ==
Alongside the Canada Soccer Hall of Fame, there are also four provincial Halls of Fame inaugurated by Canada Soccer's Provincial Member Associations (as of 2022): The Soccer Hall of Fame of British Columbia, the Manitoba Soccer Hall of Fame, the Québec Soccer Hall of Fame (Temple de la renommée du soccer québecoise), and the Newfoundland & Labrador Soccer Hall of Fame.
