= Trevor Harvey =

Trevor Harvey may refer to:

- Trevor Harvey (politician) (1885–1952), Australian politician
- Trevor Harvey (conductor) (1911–1989), English conductor
- Trevor Harvey (basketball) (born 1980), Bahamian basketball player
- Trevor Harvey (soccer) (1916–1988), Canadian soccer player
