= Western Canada Soccer League =

- Founded: 1963
- Country: Canada
- Confederation: CONCACAF
- Number of clubs: High of 10, Low of 4

The Western Canada Soccer League was a soccer league in Canada. The league operated for eight seasons over a nine-year period from 1963 to 1971 and eventually operated across nine cities in four Canadian provinces and one American state. In the 1960s, the Western Canada Soccer League was one of four major leagues in Canadian soccer alongside the Pacific Coast League, the National Soccer League of Ontario/Quebec, and the Eastern Canada Professional Soccer League.

In 1963, the league featured 10 clubs across five cities in Alberta and Saskatchewan. In 1967, the league expanded to Manitoba, thus becoming the first Canadian soccer league to operate a league schedule across three provinces. The league later added teams in British Columbia and, for one season only, a team in Washington, United States.

Along with a regular season schedule that usually operated from May to August, the Molson Cup playoffs took place in August or September. Teams also participated in other competitions including their provincial playoffs and Canada Soccer's national The Challenge Trophy competition. In 1967, in the weeks after winning the league's playoff Molson Cup, the Calgary Buffalo Kickers became the first and only Western Canada Soccer League team to reach the national final (a 2–1 loss to Toronto Ballymena).

The Western Canada Soccer League was co-founded by Alec Castleton and Sam Donaghey, both of whom were involved with the Alberta Soccer Association. The league's inaugural match was played on May 4, 1963, in Saskatoon, with opening weekend matches in Calgary and Edmonton postponed because of inclement weather. The price of admission to that opening match at Griffiths Stadium was 50 cents per ticket. Saskatoon Concordia won that first match 7–1 over Saskatoon Hollandia, with Adolf Becker the four-goal hero and George Turay scoring the first-ever goal in the Western Canada Soccer League.

The most famous player to play for a Western Canada League team, albeit not in league action, was Stanley Matthews who dressed for Calgary ATCO in two exhibition matches in July 1964. Matthews joined the Calgary squad under player-manager Les Medley, who was one of Matthews' former England teammates.

== Champions ==
The league featured a single table from 1963 to 1969 and then separate Coast and Prairie divisions in 1970 and 1971. There was also a separate playoff (Cup) competition from 1964 to 1970. Regina Concordia SC were the first champions in 1963, but they were upset in the Molson Cup by 10th place Lethbridge Hungária on 24 August 1963.

=== Champions ===
Year	Play-off champions Challenge Cup	Play-off runners-up	Regular season champions
1963	Lethbridge Hungária SC	Regina Concordia SC	Regina Concordia SC
1964	Regina Concordia SC	Lethbridge Hungária SC	Regina Concordia SC
1966	Calgary Buffalo Kickers FC	Regina Concordia SC	Edmonton Canadians
1967	Calgary Buffalo Kickers FC	Saskatoon City SC	Edmonton Victoria Canadians
1968	Calgary Kickers FC	Edmonton Victoria Canadians	Calgary Kickers FC
1969	Vancouver Spartans	Regina Concordia SC	Vancouver Spartans
1970	Victoria Royals	Regina Concordia SC	Coast: Victoria Royals; Prairies: Regina Concordia SC

=== Titles ===
Team	Playoff championships		Regular season championships		Total championships
Team	Titles	Years	Titles	Years	Total championships
Calgary Kickers FC	3	1966, 1967, 1968	1	1968	4
Regina Concordia SC	1	1964	3	1963, 1964, 1970	4
Vancouver Spartans	1	1969	1	1969	2
Edmonton Canadians / Edmonton Victoria Canadians	0		2	1966, 1967	2
Victoria Royals	1	1970	1	1970	2
Lethbridge Hungária SC	1	1963	0		1

== Teams from 1963 to 1971 ==
- Calgary ATCO (1964)
- Calgary Kickers (1966–1969)
- Calgary Croatia (1963–64)
- Edmonton Canadians / Edmonton Victoria Canadians (1966- 1969)
- Edmonton City (1970) / Edmonton Eagles (1971)
- Edmonton Edelweiss (1963–1964)
- Edmonton Excelsior (1963–1964)
- Edmonton Hungária (1963–1964)
- Edmonton Rangers (1963–1964)
- Lethbridge Hungária SC (1963–1964)
- Regina Concordia SC (1963–1964, 1966–1971)
- Regina Internationals (1963)
- Saskatoon City SC (1966–1969)
- Saskatoon Concordia (1963–1964)
- Saskatoon Hollandia (1963)
- Saskatoon Internationals (1964)
- Seattle Sea-Tac (1970)
- Vancouver Cougars (1970)
- Vancouver Spartans (1969–1971)
- Victoria Royals (1970–1971)
- Winnipeg International FC (1967–1968)
- Winnipeg Blues (1969–1971)

== Notable players ==
Twelve players from the Western Canada Soccer League have since been inducted in the Canada Soccer Hall of Fame as honoured players.

- Bob Bolitho (1970)
- Tony Chursky (1971)
- Neil Ellett (1970)
- Glen Johnson (1969 to 1971)
- Victor Kodelja (1971)
- Bob Lenarduzzi (1970 and 1971)
- Sam Lenarduzzi (1970)
- Buzz Parsons (1969 and 1970)
- Ken Pears (1969)
- Brian Robinson (1970)
- John Schepers (1963 to 1971)
- Bruce Wilson (1970)
