= John Woods (footballer) =

Scottish footballer

Personal information
- Place of birth: Scotland
- Position: Inside forward

Youth career
- Pollok
- Rangers

Senior career*
Years	Team	Apps	(Gls)
1954–1955	Rangers	1	(0)
1955–1957	Hamilton Academical	49	(19)
- Winnipeg
1958–1962	Vancouver St. Andrews FC		
1960	→ Westminster Royals FC (loan)		
1963–1967	North Shore United / Luckies		
Total		50	(19)
- * Club domestic league appearances and goals

John Woods is a Scottish former professional footballer who played as an inside forward.

== Career ==
After playing for Pollok, Woods signed for Rangers at the age of 15, and made one appearance for them in the Scottish Football League during the 1954–1955 season. That match was on 26 March 1955, and resulted in a 1–0 win for Rangers at home to Queen of the South. After leaving Rangers, Woods next played for Hamilton Academical, scoring 19 goals in 49 League appearances for them. Woods then moved to Canada to play for Winnipeg, later moving to Vancouver.

In the Pacific Coast League, Woods played five seasons for Vancouver St. Andrews FC and four seasons for North Shore United FC / Luckies. While playing for St. Andrews in 1962, Woods received a two-year ban for refusing to play in an exhibition game for the Vancouver All-Stars. After his playing career, he served as a manager for North Shore United.

In 1960, Woods played for Canada's national team on tour in the Soviet Union and United Kingdom. He then won the Canada Soccer Championship The Challenge Trophy while on loan for the Westminster Royals FC. He scored two goals in the championship match on 22 October 1960, a 4:0 win over Toronto Golden Mile.
