= Doug Greig =

Canadian soccer player (1928–2003)

Personal information
- Full name: John Douglas Greig
- Date of birth: March 16, 1928
- Place of birth: Vancouver, British Columbia, Canada
- Date of death: 9 March 2003 (aged 74)
- Height: 1.80 m (5 ft 11 in)
- Position: Left half

Senior career*
Years	Team	Apps	(Gls)
- North Shore United FC
1949–1951	Vancouver St. Andrews FC		
1951–1955	Vancouver Firefighters FC		
1953	→ Westminster Royals FC (loan)		
1956	Westminster Royals FC		
1957	Vancouver St. Andrews FC		
1958	Hale-Co FC (Vancouver City FC)		
1959	Labatt's (Vancouver St. Andrews FC)		
1960–1962	Vancouver Firefighters FC		
1962–1963	Canadians (Vancouver City FC)		

International career
1957	Canada	3	(0)
- * Club domestic league appearances and goals

Doug Greig (16 March 1928 – 9 March 2003) was a Canadian former soccer player. He was an outstanding player who played for several teams, most notably Vancouver Firefighters FC with whom he played in the 1961 Canadian final. He was also Canada's starting left half during the FIFA World Cup Qualifiers in 1957. After his retirement, he became an honoured member of the Canada Soccer Hall of Fame.

In the Pacific Coast League, Greig won six championships with four different teams from 1949–50 to 1962–63. He won two titles with Firefighters (1954–55 and 1961–62), one with Vancouver St. Andrews FC (1949–50), one with Westminster Royals FC (1956), and two with Vancouver City FC (known as Hale-Co FC in 1958 and Canadians in 1962–63). He was an all-star selection in 10 seasons from 1950 to 1963.

As a teenager in 1946–47, Greig won the Ed Bayley Trophy as BC Soccer's most outstanding player in his first year in senior soccer. He spent that first season with Pacific Coast League runners up North Shore United. He then joined Vancouver St. Andrews FC, following in the footsteps of his father and two brothers to become the fourth Greig to play for the Canadian-Scottish club. In 1949–50, Doug won his first Pacific Coast League championship playing alongside brother Jimmy.

In 1953, he played in a North American championship match on loan with Westminster Royals FC, helping the Canadian club win the Jack Diamond Trophy over the Chicago Falcons.

In 1960–61, Greig helped Firefighters FC win the Mainland League championship and BC Soccer's Province Cup. The club then represented the west in Canada Soccer's 1961 Carling Cup final against Montreal Concordia FC, but lost 1–0 in the one-match final. In 1961–62, Greig and Firefighters FC were back in the Pacific Coast League, winning the championship, the Anderson Cup, the Province Cup, and the Pacific Coast International Championship for the J.F. Kennedy Trophy.

In 1962–63, Greig rejoined the Vancouver City franchise (known that season as the Vancouver Canadians) and won his final Pacific Coast League title. Greig won the Austin Delany Memorial Trophy as the league's most valuable player.

== Personal life ==
Doug's father David Greig played for Vancouver St. Andrews FC and was a Mainland All-Star in 1921. Three brothers – George, Jimmy and Doug – followed in their father's footsteps in the Pacific Coast League and were all at one point named to provincial all-star teams.

Away from soccer, Greig worked for 37 years for the Vancouver Fire Department.
