= Gogie Stewart =

Canadian soccer player (1929–2003)

Personal information
- Full name: Gordon Selkirk Stewart
- Date of birth: January 2, 1929
- Place of birth: Vancouver, British Columbia, Canada
- Date of death: 12 May 2003 (aged 74)
- Height: 1.70 m (5 ft 7 in)
- Position: Inside forward

Senior career*
Years	Team	Apps	(Gls)
1947–48	North Shore United FC		
1948–49	Vancouver St. Andrews FC		
1949–51	Vancouver City FC		
1951–53	Westminster Royals FC		
1953–54	Everton F.C.		
1954–57	Westminster Royals FC		
1958	Nanaimo City FC		
1959	Vancouver Continentals		
1959–61	Westminster Royals FC		
1961–62	North Shore Carling's FC		
1962–64	Vancouver Columbus FC		
1964–65	Vancouver Firefighters FC		

International career
1957	Canada	4	(2)
- * Club domestic league appearances and goals

Gogie Stewart (2 January 1929 – 12 May 2003) was a Canadian multi-sport athlete and a former soccer player and lacrosse player. He was a three-time national soccer champion with Canadian clubs Vancouver City FC (1950) and Westminster Royals FC (1955, 1960) as well as a two-time national lacrosse champion with Vancouver Burrards (1949) and Nanaimo Timbermen (1956). He was one of Canada's starting inside forwards during FIFA World Cup Qualifiers in 1957. After his retirement, he became an honoured member of the Canada Soccer Hall of Fame.

== Football (Soccer) ==
In the Pacific Coast League, Stewart won six championships, five with Westminster Royals FC (1952–53, 1956, 1957, 1959, 1960-61) and one with Vancouver Firefighters FC (1964–65). From 1948–49 to 1960–61, he was a British Columbia or Vancouver all-star in 11 of 13 seasons. He notably helped British Columbia win 2–0 over Tottenham Hotspur in Vancouver on 3 June 1957 and scored the third goal in Canada's win over the USA in St. Louis on 7 July 1957.

As a teenager in 1947–48, Stewart won the Ed Bayley Trophy as BC Soccer's most outstanding player in his first year in senior soccer. He scored 10 goals in that first season with the Pacific Coast League runners up North Shore FC. He then joined Vancouver St. Andrews FC before the start of the 1948–49 season, helping his new club reach the 1948 Canadian final. After joining Vancouver City FC in 1949–50, he won his first Canadian title in 1950.

Stewart spent much of the 1950s with the Westminster Royals FC, first joining the team in 1950–51. He moved to England in July 1953 to play for Everton's second team, staying in England until May 1954. He returned to Canada and rejoined the Royals in time to win his second Canadian title in 1955. At the end of that calendar year, Stewart was named one of 10 candidates for the Vancouver Sun Athlete of the Year.

Stewart won his third Canadian title in 1960, again with the Westminster Royals. From there, the team rolled into the 1960–61 season and won the Pacific Coast League championship with an undefeated 12-4-0 record. Stewart won the Austin Delany Memorial Trophy as most valuable player of the Pacific Coast League.

In the 1960s, Stewart also played in two editions of the Pacific Coast International Championship for the J.F. Kennedy Trophy, helping Royals finish runners up in 1961 and then the Firefighters finish in third place in 1965.

Just 10 days after the 1965 Pacific Coast International Championship, Stewart played in his final Pacific Coast League match with Firefighters. On 15 May 1965, Stewart knocked out North Shore's John Woods, breaking his jaw and sending him to the hospital. Stewart eventually received a two-year suspension from the BC Soccer Commission and did not return to the Pacific Coast League.

At the international level, Stewart first played for Canada in a 1956 all-star match against FC Lokomotiv Moscow. After representing Canada in FIFA World Cup Qualifiers in 1957, he was part of Canada's side during a 1960 tour of the Soviet Union and Britain.

== Lacrosse ==
His senior lacrosse career spanned between 1949 and 1961 - playing in 152 regular season games and 59 playoff games at the Senior 'A' level in British Columbia. He won two Mann Cup championships (1949, 1956) and also reached the 1951 and 1960 finals. While playing junior lacrosse, he won back-to-back Minto Cup championships in 1948 and 1949. Stewart played four seasons (1949-1952) with Vancouver, then signed with Nanaimo in 1954. After six seasons there, he signed with New Westminster for his final Senior 'A' season in 1961. In 1967, he was a referee in the Prince George Lacrosse Association and helped lay the foundations for the revival of the sport in that city.

== Sporting career ==
Alongside his career in soccer and lacrosse, he was also a boxer and notable basketball player. As a boxer, he was a Golden Gloves winner as a teenager in 1944 and 1945.

== Soccer honours and achievements ==
Vancouver City FC

- Canadian Championship (Challenge Trophy) winner (1950)

Westminster Royals

- Canadian Championship (Challenge Trophy) winner (1955, 1960)
- Pacific Coast League winner (1952–53, 1956, 1957, 1959, 1960-61)

Vancouver Firefighters FC

- Pacific Coast League winner (1964–65)

Individual

- Ed Bayley Memorial Trophy, top rookie 1947-48
- Top scorer of the Challenge Trophy, 1955
- Austin Delany Memorial Trophy, 1960–61
- British Columbia Sports Hall of Fame (1988)
- Canada Soccer Hall of Fame (2004)
- Soccer Hall of Fame of British Columbia (2019)
