= Norm McLeod (soccer) =

Canadian soccer player

Normie McLeod
Personal information
- Full name: Norman McLeod
- Date of birth: September 19, 1938 (age 88)
- Place of birth: Vancouver, British Columbia, Canada
- Height: 1.68 m (5 ft 6 in)
- Positions: Inside forward; outside forward

Senior career*
Years	Team	Apps	(Gls)
1954–55	Vancouver St. Andrews FC		
1956	Vancouver City / Hale-Co FC		
1956–57	Vancouver Capilano's		
1957–58	Vancouver City / Hale-Co FC		
1959	North Shore Carling's FC		
1959–61	Vancouver Capilano's		
1961	San Francisco Mercuries		
1961–62	Vancouver Columbus FC		
1962	→ Vancouver Firefighters FC (loan)		
1962–67	Canadians (City FC) / Burnaby Villa		
1965	→ Vancouver Firefighters FC (loan)		
1967–68	Vancouver Eldos		
1968–69	Vancouver Firefighters FC		
1971–72	Vancouver Inter-Italia		

International career
1957	Canada	4	(1)
- * Club domestic league appearances and goals

Normie McLeod (born 19 September 1938) is a former Canadian soccer player. He was a national champion with Canadian clubs Vancouver Hale-Co FC (1956). As a teenager, he was Canada's youngest player during FIFA World Cup Qualifiers in 1957. After his retirement, he became an honoured member of the Canada Soccer Hall of Fame.

In the Pacific Coast League, McLeod won two championships with the Vancouver City FC club, with the team known as Hale-Co FC in 1958 and Molson Canadian (or Canadians) in 1962–63. In the Mainland Soccer League, he won the 1957 Imperial Cup with the Vancouver Capilano's. From 1957 to 1965, he was a British Columbia or Vancouver all-star in eight of nine seasons. He notably scored against Tottenham Hotspur in a 2–0 win in Vancouver on 3 June 1957.

He also played and scored in three editions of the Pacific Coast International Championship, twice on loan with the Vancouver Firefighters FC (1962, 1965) and once with the Pacific Coast League all-stars (1964). McLeod and the Firefighters won the 1962 J.F. Kennedy Cup.

From 1955 to 1971, he scored 124 goals in the Pacific Coast League, notably finishing as the runner-up in the league scoring race in three successive seasons (1961–62, 1962–63, 1963–64). In all, he finished top-five in the league scoring race nine times.

After representing Canada in FIFA World Cup Qualifiers in 1957, he was part of Canada's side during a 1960 tour of the Soviet Union and Britain.

In 2012, Normie McLeod was inducted into the Coquitlam Sports Hall of Fame.

== Personal life ==
Normie's brother Gordon McLeod also played in the Pacific Coast League. The two brothers were champions together at Vancouver Hale-Co FC and were part of Canada's national squad in 1960. Normie's son Norman Jr. won national titles alongside cousins Billy and Mike McLeod. Normie's other nephew, Wes McLeod, is also a member of the Canada Soccer Hall of Fame, having played in the North American Soccer League and the 1976 Olympic Games.
