= Gordie Ion =

Canadian former soccer player (born 1934)

Personal information
- Full name: Gordon Ion
- Date of birth: August 26, 1934 (age 92)
- Place of birth: Vancouver, British Columbia, Canada
- Positions: Outside forward; inside forward

Senior career*
Years	Team	Apps	(Gls)
1950–1951	Westminster Royals FC		
1952–1955	North Shore FC		
1953	→ Westminster Royals FC (loan)		
1955–1956	Vancouver Pilseners FC		
1955–1959	North Shore FC / Carling's		
1959–1960	Vancouver Hale-Co / City FC		
1960–1963	Vancouver Firefighters FC		

International career
1957	Canada	2	(0)
- * Club domestic league appearances and goals

Gordon Ion (born 26 August 1934) is a Canadian former soccer player. He was a standout player that played for several teams, most notably North Shore FC with whom he reached the 1954 and 1957 Canadian final. He was Canada's starting outside right in two matches during FIFA World Cup Qualifiers in 1957. He is an honoured member of the Canada Soccer Hall of Fame.

After making his Pacific Coast League debut in 1951–52, Ion won the Ed Bayley Trophy in 1952-53 as BC Soccer's most outstanding player in his first full year in senior soccer. At the start of the 1953–54 season, he played in the 1953 North American championship on loan with Westminster Royals FC, helping the Canadian club win the Jack Diamond Trophy over the Chicago Falcons.

From 1953 to 1957, Ion was a British Columbia all-star in five consecutive seasons. He helped British Columbia beat Northern Ireland in 1953 (he scored on a penalty kick) and Tottenham Hotspur in 1957.

== Personal life ==
Gordon's son Greg Ion was a professional and international soccer player.
