= David Stothard =

Canadian soccer player

Personal information
- Full name: David Stothard
- Date of birth: June 27, 1937 (age 89)
- Place of birth: Vancouver, British Columbia, Canada
- Height: 1.83 m (6 ft 0 in)
- Position: Right back

Senior career*
Years	Team	Apps	(Gls)
1955–1957	Westminster Royals FC		
1958	Vancouver Hale-Co FC		
1959–1962	Westminster Royals FC		
1962–1968	Victoria United / O'Keefe		
1965	→ Vancouver Firefighters FC (loan)		

International career
1957	Canada	4	(0)
- * Club domestic league appearances and goals

David Stothard (born 27 June 1937) is a former Canadian soccer player. He was a two-time national champion with Westminster Royals FC (1955 and 1960). He was Canada's starting fullback during FIFA World Cup Qualifiers in 1957 and Canada's tour of the Soviet Union and Britain in 1960. In 2006 he became an honoured member of the Canada Soccer Hall of Fame.

In the Pacific Coast League, Stothard won six championships with three clubs: three times with Westminster (1956, 1957, 1960–61), once with Vancouver Hale-Co FC (1958), and twice with Victoria O'Keefe (1966–67, 1967–68). He also helped Victoria reach the playoff final in 1965–66. He was a regular all-star selection, representing British Columbia in 10 of 11 seasons from 1956 through 1966.

While he primarily played right back, he could in fact play almost any position on the field. In 1962–63 with Victoria, he played several positions and led his team in scoring with a personal-best 13 goals. In 1965–66, he won the Austin Delany Memorial Trophy as most valuable player of the Pacific Coast League.

Along with winning two Dominion titles, he won one national runner-up medal with Westminster in 1959. He also represented three separate clubs at the Pacific Coast International Championship: with Westminster in 1961 (second place), on loan with Vancouver Firefighters in 1965 (third place), and with Victoria in 1967 (winning the J.F. Kennedy Trophy).

In June 1968, he was asked to tryout for Canada's national team in preparation for FIFA World Cup Qualifiers, but he declined the invitation on account of his decision to retire from competitive football.

== Honours and achievements ==
Westminster Royals

- Canadian Championship (Challenge Trophy) winner (1955, 1960)
- Pacific Coast League winner (1956, 1957, 1959, 1960–61)

Vancouver City FC / Hale-Co FC

- Pacific Coast League winner (1958)
- Canadian Championship (Challenge Trophy) winner (1956)

Victoria United FC / Victoria O'Keefe

- Pacific Coast League winner (1966–67, 1967–68)
- Pacific Coast International Championship for the J.F. Kennedy Trophy winner (1967)

Individual

- Ed Bayley Trophy, 1955–56
- Austin Delany Memorial Trophy, 1965–66
- Canada Soccer Hall of Fame, 2006
- Soccer Hall of Fame of British Columbia, 2019
