= Whent =

Whent is a surname. Notable people with the surname include:

- Gerry Whent (1927–2002), British businessman
- Jack Whent (1920–1999), British footballer
- Sean Whent, American police chief
