= George Anderson (soccer executive) =

George Anderson (June 23, 1890 – May 30, 1985) was a Canadian soccer organizer and manager. Born in Strichen, Aberdeenshire, Scotland, Anderson moved to Canada when he was 19, first living in Souris, Manitoba and then in Winnipeg, Manitoba. He served in the Canadian army during the First World War.

Following the Second World War, Anderson organized the relaunch of the Dominion Football Association/Canadian Football Association. He served on the executive from 1950 to 1968 and played a major role in organizing Canada's first FIFA World Cup entry in 1957 (the team did not qualify for the 1958 FIFA World Cup). Anderson has been inducted into Canada's Sports Hall of Fame, the Manitoba Sports Hall of Fame, and the Canadian Soccer Hall of Fame.
