= 1959 Canada Soccer Football Championship =

Tournament details
- Country: Canada

Final positions
- Champions: Montréal Canadian Alouettes (1st title)
- Runners-up: Westminster Royals FC

The 1959 Canada Soccer Football Championship was the 38th staging of Canada Soccer's domestic football club competition. Montréal Canadian Alouettes won the Carling’s Red Cap Trophy after they beat Westminster Royals FC in the Canadian Final at Fred Hamilton Park in Toronto on 20 September 1959.

On the road to the Canadian Final, Canadian Alouettes FC beat Lachine FC in the Québec section and then Hamilton Italo-Canadian SC in the Eastern Final.
