= James Moir (soccer) =

Canadian soccer player

Personal information
- Full name: James Nicol Moir
- Date of birth: 1900
- Place of birth: Edinburgh, Scotland
- Date of death: 11 February 1961 (aged 60–61)
- Place of death: Toronto, Ontario, Canada
- Position: Forward

Senior career*
Years	Team	Apps	(Gls)
1925–1941	Toronto Ulster United		

International career
1925	Canada	1	(0)
- * Club domestic league appearances and goals

James Moir (1900 – 11 February 1961) was a soccer player who played as a defender for Toronto Ulster United. Born in Scotland, he played for Canada.

== Career ==
Moir was born in Edinburgh, Scotland, and moved to Toronto, Canada in 1913. He played with Linfield Rovers junior team, and later with Toronto All Scots. He played with Toronto Ulster United in the Inter-City League and later in the National Soccer League. Throughout his tenure with Toronto he would secure the Challenge Trophy in 1925, and was named the tournament's MVP. In 1932, he participated in the NSL Championship final where Toronto defeated Montreal Carsteel for the title.

He died on February 11, 1961, in Toronto from coronary thrombosis. In 2017, he was inducted into the Canada Soccer Hall of Fame.

== International career ==
Moir made his debut for the Canada men's national soccer team on November 8, 1925, against the United States in a friendly match.
