= George Anderson (Canadian soccer) =

Canadian soccer player (1901–1975)

Personal information
- Date of birth: 2 December 1900
- Place of birth: Bathgate, Scotland
- Date of death: 25 May 1975 (aged 73)
- Place of death: Vancouver, Canada
- Position: Full-back

Senior career*
Years	Team	Apps	(Gls)
1924	Ladysmith		
1926	Canadian Collieries		
1928–1936	Westminster Royals		

International career
1924	Canada	6	(0)
- * Club domestic league appearances and goals

George McQueen Anderson (2 December 1900 – 25 May 1975) was an early prominent member of the Canadian national soccer team.

Born in Bathgate, Scotland in 1901, Anderson played as a full-back for all of Canada's six international games of their 1924 tour of Australia when the Canadians finished with a win-loss-draw record of 2-3-1. The tour began in Sydney on May 10 and ended in Newcastle on July 27, with Canada having played 26 games. One game was played in New Zealand on the way home against an Auckland representative team. His club at this time was Ladysmith.

He played in the Challenge Trophy final of 1926 for Canadian Collieries of Cumberland, when that team were beaten by United Weston of Winnipeg. He was also a member of the Westminster Royals Canadian championship teams of 1927–28 and 1929–30 that defeated Montreal CNR, and the 1935–36 team that defeated United Weston. In addition, he was a member of the same Royals team that won all the British Columbia competitions in the 1928–29 season, but were beaten in the B.C. qualifying competition for the national championship by Vancouver St. Saviours. The 1927–28 Westminster Royals team, which did not win the national championship, were inducted into the British Columbia Sports Hall of Fame in 1979.

Anderson played on a number of B.C. all-star teams, including for Upper Island and the Pacific Coast League all-stars against the English touring team in 1926 and B.C. Lower Mainland against the Welsh FA in 1929.

He was inducted into the Canadian Soccer Hall of Fame in 2015 as a pioneer.
