= 1960 Canada Soccer Football Championship =

Tournament details
- Country: Canada

Final positions
- Champions: Westminster Royals FC (8th title)
- Runners-up: SC Golden Mile Toronto

The 1960 Canada Soccer Football Championship was the 39th staging of Canada Soccer's domestic football club competition. Westminster Royals FC won the Carling’s Red Cap Trophy after they beat SC Golden Mile Toronto in the Canadian Final at Empire Field in Vancouver on 23 October 1960.

On the road to the Canadian Final, Westminster Royals FC beat Vancouver Capilano FC in the BC section and then Calgary Kickers FC in the Western Final.
