= Brian Philley =

Canadian soccer player (1926–2002)

Personal information
- Full name: John Brian Philley
- Date of birth: 15 August 1926
- Place of birth: Saskatoon, Saskatchewan, Canada
- Date of death: 30 August 2002 (aged 76)
- Place of death: Vancouver, British Columbia, Canada
- Height: 1.78 m (5 ft 10 in)
- Positions: Inside forward; centre forward

Youth career
- Vancouver St. Joseph's

Senior career*
Years	Team	Apps	(Gls)
1942–1943	Vancouver St. Andrews FC		
1943–1944	North Shore United FC		
1944–1948	Vancouver St. Saviours / City		
1948–1950	Vancouver St. Andrews FC		
1950–1951	North Shore United FC		
1950–1957	Vancouver City / Hale-Co		
1958	Vancouver St. Andrews FC		
1959	Vancouver City / Hale-Co		
1959–1961	Westminster Royals FC		
1962–1963	Canadians (Vancouver City FC)		

International career
1957	Canada	4	(2)
- * Club domestic league appearances and goals

Brian Philley (15 August 1926 – 30 August 2002) was a former Canadian soccer player. He was a two-time national champion with Vancouver City FC (known as Hale-Co FC in 1956) and Westminster Royals FC (1960). He was Canada's starting inside forward or centre forward during FIFA World Cup Qualifiers in 1957. He is an honoured member of the Canada Soccer Hall of Fame.

In the Pacific Coast League, Philley won five championships with three clubs: three times with Vancouver City (1944-45 St. Saviours, 1953–54 City, 1962-63 Canadians), once with St. Andrews FC (1949–50), and once with Westminster (1960–61). He was a regular all-star selection, representing British Columbia or Vancouver in eight of 14 seasons from 1945–46 to 1958–59. He notably scored against Tottenham Hotspur in a 2–0 win in Vancouver on 3 June 1957. He also scored against the USA in a 3-2 win in St. Louis on 7 July 1957.

Brian was just 16 years old when he made his Pacific Coast league debut on 20 May 1943, coming in as a substitute and scoring once in St. Andrews FC's 4–5 loss to St. Saviours. Across 20 Pacific Coast League seasons, he scored 114 goals, notably finishing as league runner up in 1948-49 (when he scored a career-high 15 goals) and 1949-50 (13 goals). Over the course of one decade, he was the Pacific Coast league's joint second-highest scorer in the 1950s with 66 goals.

In 1953, he played in a North American championship match on loan with Westminster Royals FC, helping the Canadian club win the Jack Diamond Trophy over the Chicago Falcons.

When he retired from soccer he became a referee and a member of the board of directors of the B.C. Soccer Association. He was inducted into the B.C. Sports Hall of Fame in 1997.

== Personal life ==
Brian's brother Pat Philley also played in the Pacific Coast League and was likewise honoured by the Canada Soccer Hall of Fame. While the two brothers often played for different teams, they were both part of Vancouver City's 1953-54 championship team. The brothers also played together for Vancouver St. Andrews FC in 1958, on several provincial all-star teams, and for Canada in 1956 and 1957.

== Honours ==
St. Saviours / Vancouver City FC / Hale-Co FC / Canadians

- Pacific Coast League winner (1944–45, 1953–54, 1962–63)
- Canadian Championship (Challenge Trophy) winner (1956)

St. Andrews FC

- Pacific Coast League winner (1949–50)

North Shore United FC

- Pacific Coast League winner (1950–51)

Westminster Royals

- Canadian Championship (Challenge Trophy) winner (1960)
- Pacific Coast League winner (1960–61)

Individual

- MVP of the Canadian Championship (Challenge Trophy), 1956
- BC Soccer Award of Merit, 1995
- British Columbia Sports Hall of Fame (1997)
- Canada Soccer Hall of Fame (2003)
- Soccer Hall of Fame of British Columbia (2019)
