= Westminster Royals =

- Founded: 1920s
- League: Vancouver and District League Pacific Coast Soccer League
Home colours	Away colours

The Westminster Royals (also Westminster United or New Westminster Royals FC) were a Canadian soccer club based in New Westminster, British Columbia. It has the distinction of winning Canada Soccer's The Challenge Trophy nine times, setting the existing record for most domestic cup championships by a team in Canada. Originally known as Westminster United in 1912, they were Canada's dominant team for close to a decade from when they were known as the Westminster Royals in the 1920s and 1930s. They were later known as New Westminster Royals FC when they rejoined the Pacific Coast League in 1948–49.

From their first of two dynasties, they became the first Canadian team to win the Challenge Trophy four times (1928, 1930, 1931, 1936).

Wrote Winnipeg sports journalist Vince Leah in 1943, "you can name the famous Canadian soccer teams on one hand... Westminster Royals, Toronto Ulster, Montréal Carsteel and United Weston.

== History ==
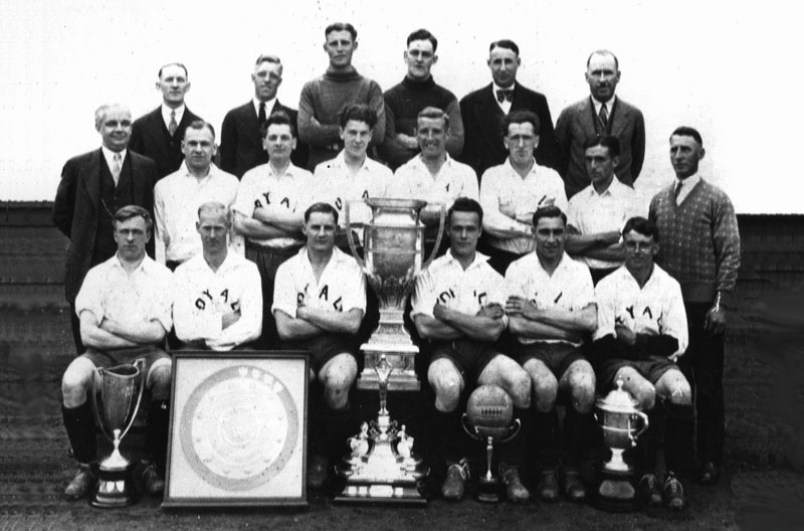
The 1928 team

=== First national championship ===
The Royals first attracted national attention in the 1927–1928 season when they won the Dominion of Canada Football Championship with a team considered to be one of the finest of its time. After winning the qualifying competition in B.C. the Royals went on to defeat the Alberta champions Edmonton Canadian Legion 4-0 and 9–6, before heading east to Winnipeg where they beat the local club Westbrook 7-1 and 2–0 in the western final to advance to the national final played at Carruthers Park. The opposition from the east was Montreal CNR and the Royals won a close game 3-2 and were expected to clinch the title in the second game but were upset by two goals to one, with Montreal forcing a third game. This time Westminster made no mistake winning by 6 goals to one. That game was played on Wednesday August 1, 1928.

Just seven weeks later the Royals opened the 1928–1929 season against another New Westminster club, Sapperton and played through the regular season without losing a game. In the qualifying competition for the national championship the defending champions defeated B.C. telephone, then St. Andrews before being beaten 1-3 and 3-5 by the St. Saviours club of Vancouver and eliminated.

=== Second national championship ===
But the Royals didn't slip up in the 1929–30 season, reaching the national final for the second time, where the final was a repeat of the 1928 final with the team beating Montreal CNR 1–0 in the first game, losing the second 5-0 and winning the third 1–0. This while the Royals might have won the championship by two games to one, they lost on an aggregate score by 2 goals to five.

=== Third national championship ===
A third national championship followed, but not before a lot of controversy. In June 1931 a national representative team from England played in Vancouver and some of the Royals players were selected to represent Vancouver. Some of them refused to play, saying they were tired as a result of playing so many games. Those players were suspended by the B.C. Football Association, thus weakening the Royals heading into the national championships. But replacements were found and the team, now known locally as the Royals Remnants, once again reached the final. As it turned out the remnants of the Royals won comfortably beating Toronto Scottish 2-0 and 3–0.

Dickie Stobbart, who won two titles with Nanaimo City (1923, 1927) and two titles with Westminster Royals (1928, 1931), became the first footballer to win the Challenge Trophy four times.

=== 1936 ===
Following the 1931 triumph the Royals faded from the national picture until 1936. Then, with the final being played in Vancouver, they defeated United Weston from Winnipeg 6–1 in the first game, but oddly enough lost the second for the third time 2–1, before going on to win the trophy in the third game 3–0.

Towards the end of the 1930s soccer in B.C. was in turmoil and the Royals faded from the scene in September 1938, only to be resurrected at the start of the 1948 season. An era ended in 1938 and a new one began 10 years later.

Captain Dave Turner became the first footballer to win the Challenge Trophy four times with the same team.

=== 1950s ===
The new Westminster Royals, like the old had many great players and went on to add four more national championships to the name of B.C.s Royal city. Success was not immediate and the Royals did not reach the final until 1952, only to lose in three games to Montreal Stelco. But the beautiful F.A. Trophy awarded to the national champions was back on the shelf in 1953 following a win over Montreal Hakoah. Three more national championships followed in 1955, 1956 and 1958 with wins over Montreal Ukraina, Winnipeg Germania and Winnipeg Scottish. when the team was awarded the Carling Cup, as a result of Carling Breweries sponsoring the competition.

Only the second defeat in nine finals followed with a loss to the professional Montreal Alouettes in 1959, before the Royals win the national championship in 1960 with a 4–0 defeat of Toronto Golden Mile.

Captain Buster Cairns became the first footballer to win the Challenge Trophy five times, once with Vancouver City FC (1950) and four times with Westminster Royals FC (1953, 1955, 1958, 1960).

=== 1961 ===
In 1961 Westminster Royals represented Canada in the first John F. Kennedy Cup competition for the nations of the west coast of North America. In the first game they beat the San Francisco All-Stars 3–0, but lost 3–0 to the Mexican Selects in the final. The games were played in Los Angeles.

Throughout most of these years the Royals played in the Pacific Coast League, but also competed for the Province Cup, the championship of B.C. and the Mainland Cup, the championship of the B.C. Lower Mainland.

In 1961, the Royals lost to a Mexican Select team 3–0 in the first Pacific international soccer tournament in Los Angeles.

=== Succeeding years ===
In 1962–63, both New Westminster Royals FC and Vancouver St. Andrews FC pulled out of the Pacific Coast League after the BC Commission ordered the promotion of Vancouver Pilsener's FC to the league. While St. Andrews had already played one match, New Westminster had not played any matches. A month later, a new team called New Westminster Royal City FC were admitted to the league with former Royals coach Cecil Goodheart as president.

In 1963-64, the Royals rejoined the Pacific Coast Soccer League. In 1967-68, the team was renamed Westminster Labatt’s; in 1969-70, they were renamed Westminster Blues. In 1972-73, they won their ninth Challenge Trophy as national champions.

== Season-by-season record ==
Westminster Royals FC's season-by-season post-War record in the Pacific Coast League. Note: MP = Matches played, W = Wins, D = Draws, L = Losses, Pts = Points, GF = Goals for, GA = Goals against

Season	MP	W	D	L	Pts	GF	GA	Finish	Playoffs	Province	Canada
1948-49	18	9	2	7	20	32	35	2nd in PCSL	No playoffs		
1949-50	15	4	0	11	8	29	39	4th in PCSL	No playoffs		
1950-51	12	3	2	7	8	23	32	5th in PCSL	No playoffs		
1951-52	20	6	5	9	17	37	41	5th in PCSL	No playoffs	Lost 1952 BC Province Cup Final; Won 1952 CSFA provincial playdowns	
1952-53	15	11	0	4	22	47	30	1st in PCSL	No playoffs	Lost 1953 BC Province Cup Final; Won 1953 CSFA provincial playdowns	Lost 1952 Final
1953-54	15	7	3	5	17	27	21	3rd in PCSL	No playoffs		Won 1953 Challenge Trophy
1954-55	23	10	4	9	24	61	52	2nd in PCSL	No playoffs	Won 1955 CSFA provincial playdowns	
1955-56	6	1	2	3	4	6	8	Season cut short	-	-	Won 1955 Challenge Trophy
1956	21	16	3	2	35	70	37	1st in PCSL	No playoffs		
1957	13	9	0	4	18	41	30	1st in PCSL	No playoffs		
1958	20	12	1	7	25	57	41	3rd in PCSL	No playoffs	Won 1958 CSFA provincial playdowns	Won 1958 Challenge Trophy
1959	12	9	2	1	20	35	16	1st in PCSL	No playoffs	Won 1959 CSFA provincial playdowns	-
1959-60	17	9	1	7	19	42	35	3rd in PCSL	No playoffs	Won 1960 CSFA provincial playdowns	Lost Won 1959 Final
1960-61	16	12	4	0	26	46	16	1st in PCSL	No playoffs		Won 1960 Challenge Trophy
1961-62	24	7	4	13	18	39	56	5th in PCSL	No playoffs		
1962-63	0	-	-	-	-	-	-	Pulled out of PCSL	-		
1963-64	21	5	3	13	13	26	48	7th in PCSL	Missed playoffs	Lost 1964 provincial semifinal	
1964-65	23	7	5	11	19	33	43	5th in PCSL	Missed playoffs		
1965-66	21	5	3	13	13	28	50	7th in PCSL	Missed playoffs		
1966-67	21	7	2	12	16	29	32	6th in PCSL	Missed playoffs		
1967-68	18	7	4	7	18	25	27	5th in PCSL	Missed playoffs		
1968-69	24	13	3	8	29	47	36	4th in PCSL	Lost playoff semifinals		
1969-70	16	8	2	6	18	32	4	4th in PCSL	Lost playoff semifinals		
1970-71	24	8	1	15	17	27	48	8th in PCSL	Missed playoffs		
1971-72	15	7	1	7	15	23	30	4th in PCSL	Lost playoff semifinals	Won 1972 BC Province Cup	
1972-73	18	14	1	3	29	54	17	1st in PCSL	Won 1973 Top Star Trophy	Lost 1973 provincial final	Won 1972 Challenge Trophy

== Notable players ==
The following Westminster Royals FC alumni have been honoured by the Canada Soccer Hall of Fame in the players category.

- Frank Ambler: 1949-50
- George Anderson: 1930s
- Garry Ayre: 1973-76
- Eddie Bak: 1958-60
- Roy Cairns: 1948-50, 1952-61
- Jock Coulter: 1920s and 1930s
- Errol Crossan: 1951-54, 1961-62, 1966-69
- Bill Findler: 1930s
- Doug Greig: 1956
- Trevor Harvey: 1935-37, 1950-51
- Art Hughes: 1950

- Gordie Ion: 1951-52
- Ken Pears: 1951-54, 1959
- Brian Philley: 1959-61
- Pat Philley: 1948-49, 1956-57
- Jimmy Spencer: 1930s
- Gogie Stewart: 1950-62
- Dickie Stobbart: 1920s & 1930s
- David Stothard: 1955-57, 1959-62
- Dave Turner: 1920s & 1930s
- Jack Whent: 1953-55

== Honours ==
=== Titles & trophies ===
- Canada Soccer Challenge Trophy (9): 1928, 1930, 1931, 1936, 1953, 1955, 1958, 1960, 1973
- Canada Soccer BC section playoffs: 1952, 1953, 1955, 1958, 1959, 1960
- British Columbia Province Cup: 1929, 1930, 1931, 1936, 1972
- Pacific Coast League: 1952-53, 1956, 1957, 1959, 1960-61, 1972-73
- Top Star Trophy (PCSL Playoffs): 1973
- Mainland Cup: 1928, 1929
- Mainland Richardson Cup: 1953

=== More honours ===
- 1928 Royals FC team: Canada Soccer Hall of Fame Team of Distinction & Soccer Hall of Fame of British Columbia Team of Distinction
- 1928-29 Royals FC team: British Columbia Sports Hall of Fame
- 1928 Royals FC team: The Canadian Press Best Team in 50 Years, 1950
