= Mainland Cup =

- Founded: 1909 (as Mainland Challenge Trophy)
- Abolished: 1952
- Region: Canada (CONCACAF)

The Mainland Cup was a knock-out cup competition for soccer clubs in the Canadian province of British Columbia. The tournament served as the de facto championship for clubs in the province from 1909 to 1952.

== History ==
The Mainland Challenge Cup was founded in 1909 and was contested by clubs in Vancouver and the Lower Mainland region. The Mainland Cup trophy was donated in 1914 by Vancouver legislator William Bowser, who would go on to serve as Premier from 1915 to 1916. The trophy later disappeared, but was recovered and is displayed at the BC Sports Hall of Fame; at one point during its disappearance, the trophy had been used as a garden planter.

The cup was originally played by four teams from the B.C. First Division, but was later expanded to include extra rounds and teams from the Second Division.

The 1933 edition of the cup was won by a team of Chinese students over the University of British Columbia, sparking celebrations in the Chinese community.

In October 1952, the Pacific Coast Soccer League announced that it would have its teams compete in a new tournament that would replace the Mainland Cup.

== List of finals ==
(R) indicates a final that was played as a replay

Mainland Cup winners
Season	Winners	Score	Runners–up	Venue	Attendance
1915	Coquitlam Ranchers	3–0 (R)	B.C. Electric		
