= Carrie Serwetnyk =

Canadian soccer player

Personal information
- Date of birth: July 17, 1965 (age 61)
- Place of birth: Hamilton, Ontario
- Height: 1.65 m (5 ft 5 in)
- Position: Forward

College career
| Years | Team | Apps | (Gls) |
| 1985–87 | North Carolina Tar Heels | | |

Senior career*
| Years | Team | Apps | (Gls) |
| 1988–1990 | Jeunesse Sportive Féminine de Poissy | | |
| 1992 | Fujita Tendai SC Mercury | | |
| 1993–1994 | Yomiuri Beleza | | |
| 1997 | Boston Renegades | 4 | (0) |

International career
| 1986–1996 | Canada | 18 | (1) |
- * Club domestic league appearances and goals

Carrie Serwetnyk is a former forward with the Canada women's national soccer team from 1986 to 1991. While playing with Canada, Serwetnyk appeared at the 1988 FIFA Women's Invitation Tournament and the 1991 FIFA Women's World Cup qualification before leaving the team in 1991. After playing in Japan in the early 1990s, Serwetnyk returned to the Canadian national team in 1996 before retiring. Serwetnyk was the first woman to be named into the Canada Soccer Hall of Fame upon her 2001 induction and was a torchbearer for the 2010 Winter Olympics.

== Early life and education ==
Serwetnyk was born on July 17, 1965 in Hamilton, Ontario. She spent her childhood in Mississauga, Ontario and attended the University of North Carolina at Chapel Hill between 1985 and 1987. While at North Carolina, Serwetnyk played with the North Carolina Tar Heels women's soccer team and received a Bachelor of Fine Arts.

== Career ==
Apart from the Tar Heels, Serwetnyk played on the Canada women's national soccer team from 1986 to 1991 excluding 1989. During these five years, Serwetnyk participated in multiple events including the 1988 FIFA Women's Invitation Tournament and the 1991 FIFA Women's World Cup qualification. She scored her only goal with the Canadian national team at a 1990 invitational match in Winnipeg, Manitoba. Serwetnyk played with Fujita SC Mercury in 1992 and the Yomiuri soccer team from 1993 to 1994. While in Japan, she scored a total of sixteen goals. Outside of Japan, Serwetnyk played on a French soccer team in Poissy before ending her athletic career with Canada in 1996 and started painting. In 1997 Serwetnyk played for Boston Renegades of the USL W-League, serving one assist in her four appearances. In 2014, Serwetnyk opened up a Vancouver soccer company for girls attending elementary school.

== Awards and honours ==
Serwetnyk became the first woman to be inducted into the Canada Soccer Hall of Fame after her 2001 selection. She was chosen as a torchbearer for the 2010 Winter Olympics.
