= 1928 Canadian Challenge Trophy =

1928 Dominion of Canada Football Championship
Tournament details
- Country: Canada

Final positions
- Champions: Westminster Royals FC (1st title)
- Runners-up: Montréal CNR

The 1928 Dominion of Canada Football Championship was the 13th staging of Canada Soccer's domestic football club competition. Westminster Royals FC won the Challenge Trophy after they beat Montréal CNR in a best-of-three series at Carruthers Park in Winnipeg from 28 July to 1 August 1928. It was Westminster's first of four Dominion titles in a nine-year span.

After winning the British Columbia section, Westminster Royals FC beat Edmonton Canadian Legion and Winnipeg Westbrook on the road to the Canadian Final.

== Provincial qualification ==
=== BC Finals ===
9 June 1928	Westminster Royals	5–1	Ladysmith	Vancouver, BC
				Stadium: Con Jones Park

16 June 1928	Westminster Royals	5–2	Esquimault	Vancouver, BC
				Stadium: Royal Athletic Park

23 June 1928	Westminster Royals	3–2	St. Saviours	Vancouver, BC
				Stadium: Con Jones Park

7 July 1928	Westminster Royals	5–2	St. Paul's	Vancouver, BC
				Stadium: Con Jones Park

== National Competition ==
=== Bracket ===
Quarter-finals
(Manitoba)	Winnipeg Westbrook	0	3	2	2
(Saskatchewan)	Saskatoon Thistles	1	2	0	1
(British Columbia)	Westminster Royals	4	9	n	2
(Alberta)	Edmonton Canadian Legion	0	6	n	0
(Quebec)	Montreal CNR	0	?	?	2
(Ontario)	Toronto Ulster United	1	?	?	1

Semi-finals
(Manitoba)	Winnipeg Westbrook	1	0	n	0
(British Columbia)	Westminster Royals	7	2	n	2
(Ontario)	Fort William Legion	2	0	n	0
(Quebec)	Montreal CNR	6	6	n	2

National Final
(British Columbia)	Westminster Royals	3	1	6	2
(Quebec)	Montreal CNR	2	2	1	1

=== BC/Alberta Finals ===
14 July 1928	Westminster Royals	4–0	Edmonton Canadian Legion	Vancouver, BC
				Stadium: Con Jones Park

16 July 1928	Westminster Royals	9–6	Edmonton Canadian Legion

=== Western Canada Finals ===
23 July 1928	Westminster Royals	7–1	Winnipeg Westbrook

25 July 1928	Westminster Royals	2–0	Winnipeg Westbrook

=== National Finals ===
28 July 1928	Westminster Royals	3–2	Montreal CNR	Winnipeg, MB
	Jock Coulter; Jock Coulter; Dave Turner		Bill Finlayson; Bill Finlayson	Stadium: Carruthers Park

30 July 1928	Montreal CNR	2–1	Westminster Royals	Winnipeg, MB
	Edward McGuire; John Coule		Jock Coulter	Stadium: Carruthers Park; Attendance: 5,000

1 August 1928	Westminster Royals	6–1	Montreal CNR	Winnipeg, MB
	Dickie Stobbart; Jock Coulter; Jock Coulter; Jock Coulter; Jock Coulter; Adam Kerr		Edward McGuire	Stadium: Carruthers Park
