= Buster Cairns =

Canadian soccer player

Roy Cairns
Personal information
- Full name: Roy Desmond Cairns
- Date of birth: February 15, 1925
- Place of birth: Clayburn, British Columbia, Canada
- Date of death: 13 November 2010 (aged 85)
- Height: 1.68 m (5 ft 6 in)
- Position: Left back

Senior career*
Years	Team	Apps	(Gls)
1947–1948	Vancouver St. Andrews FC		
1948–1950	Westminster Royals FC		
1950	Vancouver City FC		
1950–1952	Vancouver St. Andrews FC		
1952–1961	Westminster Royals FC		

International career
1957	Canada	3	(0)
- * Club domestic league appearances and goals

Roy Desmond "Buster" Cairns (15 February 1925 – 13 November 2010) was a Canadian soccer player. He was a five-time national champion with Canadian clubs Vancouver City FC (1950) and Westminster Royals FC (1953, 1955, 1958, 1960). He was also Canada's starting left back for three matches during FIFA World Cup Qualifiers in 1957. After his retirement, he became an honoured member of the Canada Soccer Hall of Fame.

In the Pacific Coast League, Cairns won five championships, one with Vancouver St. Andrews (1947–48) and four with the Westminster Royals FC (1952–53, 1956, 1957, and 1960-61). He was a regular all-star selection, representing British Columbia in four-straight years from 1950 to 1953 and then again in 1957. Along with winning five Challenge Trophy titles, he also won three runner-up medals (1951 with St. Andrews, 1952 and 1959 with Westminster).

He was at his best in 1953 when he was the most valuable player of the Canadian Football Championship. After winning the national title, he captained Westminster to the North American Club Championship over the Chicago Falcons.

In later years, Cairns worked as a volunteer in the Crime Prevention Office of the New Westminster Police Office. He was inducted into Abbotsford Sports Hall of Fame in 2008.
