= Jack Cowan =

Canadian soccer player

Personal information
- Date of birth: 6 June 1927
- Place of birth: Vancouver, British Columbia, Canada
- Date of death: 10 December 2000 (aged 73)
- Height: 1.84 m (6 ft 0 in)
- Position: Left back

Youth career
- Hastings Bluebirds
- 1945–49: UBC Thunderbirds

Senior career*
Years	Team	Apps	(Gls)
1947–49	St. Saviours / Vancouver City FC		(0)
1949–1954	Dundee	115	(1)
1954–56	Vancouver City FC / Hale-Co FC		(8)

International career
1956	Canada	0	(0)
Signature
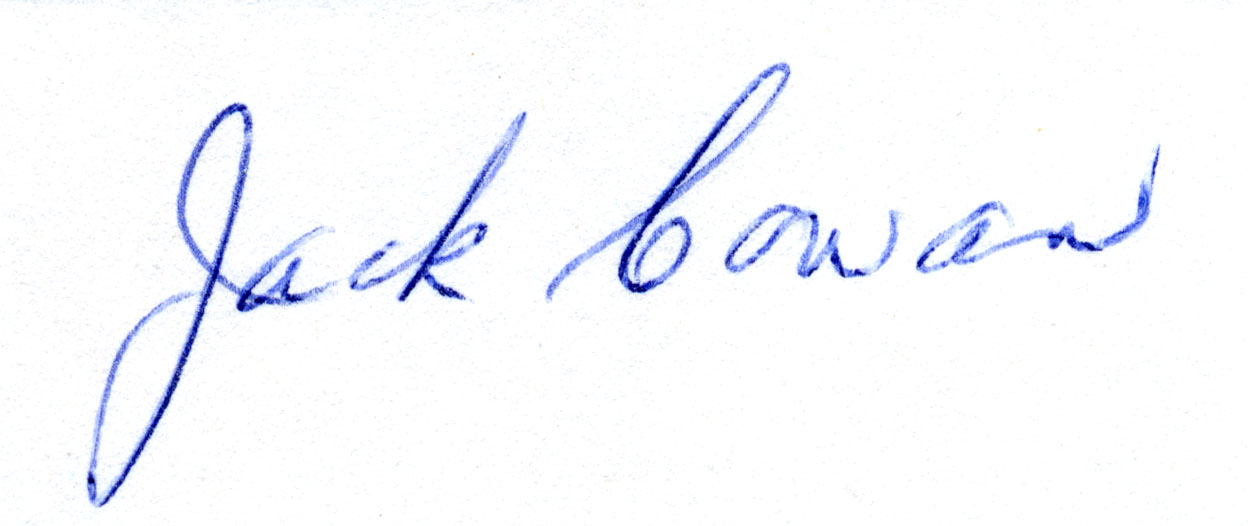
- * Club domestic league appearances and goals

Jack Cowan (6 June 1927 – 10 December 2000) was a Canadian soccer player who won championships in both Canada and Scotland. He won the Scottish League Cup with Dundee in 1951–52 (also playing on the losing side in the final of that season's Scottish Cup), then capped off his career by winning Canada Soccer's Carling Cup with Vancouver Hale-Co FC. He was inducted into the Canada Soccer Hall of Fame as a player in 2000.

While attending the University of British Columbia, Cowan made his Pacific Coast League in 1947–48 with Vancouver St. Saviours. He again played for the team in 1948-49 (renamed Vancouver City FC) and was selected to the British Columbia All-Stars at year's end.

After five seasons in Scotland, Cowan returned to Canada to start his engineering career. He also rejoined Vancouver City FC, who in 1955-56 were renamed Vancouver Hale-Co FC. In 1956, he helps his club with the national title. He played in several all-star matches, including representative teams for British Columbia, Western Canada, and Canada. He played one match for Canada, an exhibition match against FC Lokomotiv Moscow on 18 August 1956.

Cowan retired from soccer after the 1956 season at age twenty-nine.
