= Len Peto =

National Hockey League executive (1892–1985)

- Born: Leonard Arthur Peto; June 25, 1892; London, England
- Died: November 10, 1985 (aged 93); Vallejo, California, United States
- Occupation: Sports executive

Leonard Arthur Peto (June 25, 1892 – November 10, 1985) was a National Hockey League executive and a director of both the Montreal Canadiens and the Montreal Maroons. His name was engraved on the Stanley Cup in 1944 with the Montreal Canadiens.

Leonard Arthur Peto was born in London, England, and died in Vallejo, Solano County, California. He came to Canada in 1912 and joined the staff of the Canadian Car and Foundry Company eventually rising to the position of vice president and managing director. At about the same time he joined the Montreal Amateur Athletic Association (MAAA). During his soccer career in Canada, he played in goal for the MAAA and was also a member of the Montreal All-Star team that played in the Carls-Rite Cup game against the Toronto All-Stars in 1915. When a knee injury took him out of competition he turned to organizing and became the man behind Montréal Carsteel FC, one of the greatest teams in Canadian soccer history. During the turbulent years of the 1920s, he was also involved with the Inter-Provincial League and then became the first president of the National Soccer League when it was formed in 1926, a position he held for 10 years. He was also behind an ill-fated attempt to form an International League between teams in the National Soccer League and the American Soccer League in 1926, the league lasted just one season. He also found himself in trouble with the Dominion of Canada Football Association (today's Canadian Soccer Association) over an attempt to play Sunday soccer in Montreal when soccer on the Sabbath was frowned on in Canada. However, as time went on he returned to favour and was elected President of the Dominion of Canada Football Association in 1935, a position he held until 1939. In later years he switched his interest to Canadian football and then to hockey. In 1940, along with D.C. Coleman, he was invited by Senator Donat Raymond to join the board of directors of the Canadian Arena Company, and this led to him becoming one of a three-man committee directing operations of the NHL Canadiens when the club was taken over by Forum interests from private ownership. For some years previous he had been honorary president of the Montreal Royals of the Quebec Senior Hockey League.

He later moved to Philadelphia, where in 1945 he sought to revive the dormant Maroons franchise. The team had suspended operations in 1938, and World War II had prevented their return. While Peto got swift approval to move the Maroons to Philadelphia, he was stymied by the lack of an arena that was suitable even for temporary use. In March 1946, Peto planned to construct an arena at the site of the Philadelphia Phillies' former ballpark. After two years of attempts to find an adequate arena or fund a new one, he returned the Maroons franchise to the league.

His soccer team Montréal Carsteel FC dominated soccer in Quebec, winning the Quebec Cup, the championship of Quebec in 1925, 1927, 1931, 1932, 1933, 1934, 1937, 1938, and 1939. Carsteel also reached the final of the Canadian Challenge Cup in 1939, only to lose to Vancouver Radials in four close games. He was a member of the Mount Stephen Club in Montreal, the Kanawaki Golf Club, and the St. George Snowshoe Club, and a Life Member of the Province of Quebec Football Association and of the Dominion of Canada Football Association. In 2011, he was inducted into the Canadian Soccer Hall of Fame as a pioneer.
