= 1955 FA Canada Championship =

Tournament details
- Country: Canada

Final positions
- Champions: Westminster Royals FC (6th title)
- Runners-up: SA Ukraina Montréal

The 1955 FA Canada Championship was the 34th staging of Canada Soccer's domestic football club competition. Westminster Royals FC won the Carling's Red Cap Trophy after they beat SA Ukraina Montréal in a best-of-three series in Toronto from 18 to 21 September 1955.

After winning the British Columbia section, Westminster Royals FC beat Calgary Danish Canadians and Winnipeg Institute Provista AC on the road to the Canadian Final.
