= Pat Philley =

Canadian soccer player (1929–2019)

Personal information
- Full name: H. Patrick Philley
- Date of birth: April 24, 1929
- Place of birth: Vancouver, British Columbia, Canada
- Date of death: November 22, 2019 (aged 90)
- Place of death: Vancouver, British Columbia, Canada
- Position: Centre-half
1953–54	Vancouver City / Hale-Co		
1956–57	Westminster Royals FC		
1958	Vancouver St. Andrews FC		

International career
Years	Team	Apps	(Gls)
1957	Canada	3	(0)

Pat Philley (24 April 1929 – 22 November 2019) was a Canadian soccer player. He was a national champion with Vancouver City FC in 1950. He was Canada's starting centre half and captain during three matches in FIFA World Cup Qualifiers in 1957. He is an honoured member of the Canada Soccer Hall of Fame.

In the Pacific Coast League, Philley won two championships, the first with Vancouver City FC in 1953–54 and the second with Westminster Royals FC in 1956. He was a regular all-star selection, representing British Columbia or Vancouver in six of nine seasons from 1948–49 to 1956–57. He was part of the BC All-Stars team that won 2–0 over Tottenham Hotspur in Vancouver on 3 June 1957.

In 2014, Pat Philley was inducted into the Coquitlam Sports Hall of Fame.

== Personal ==
Pat's brother Brian Philley also played in the Pacific Coast League and was likewise honoured by the Canada Soccer Hall of Fame. While the two brothers often played for different teams, they were both part of Vancouver City's 1953–54 championship team. The brothers also played together for Vancouver St. Andrews FC in 1958, on several provincial all-star teams, and for Canada in 1956 and 1957.

== Honours ==
=== Club ===
Vancouver City FC

- Canada Soccer Championship for The Challenge Trophy: 1950
- Pacific Coast League: 1953–54

Westminster Royals FC

- Pacific Coast League: 1956
