= Bill Gill (soccer) =

Canadian soccer player

Personal information
- Full name: William Gill
- Date of birth: April 15, 1919
- Place of birth: Montreal, Quebec, Canada
- Height: 1.85 m (6 ft 1 in)
- Position: Goalkeeper

Youth career
- Westmount

Senior career*
Years	Team	Apps	(Gls)
- CPR Glen Yards
1947–1952	Montréal Stelco		
1953–1955	Montréal Hakoah FC		
1956	Sparta FC		
- * Club domestic league appearances and goals

Bill Gill (born April 15, 1919, date of death unknown) was a Canadian soccer goalkeeper. He was a member of the Montreal Stelco squad who won the national title in 1952.

In 1952, the year he led Stelco to the national title over Westminster Royals FC, Gill won the McLagan Trophy as Montreal's most valuable player. In 1953, he joined Montréal Hakoah FC and led his new club to the Canadian final, but this time lost the three-game series to Westminster.
