= Luce Mongrain =

Canadian soccer player

Personal information
- Date of birth: 11 January 1971 (age 55)
- Place of birth: Trois-Rivières, Quebec, Canada
- Height: 1.73 m (5 ft 8 in)
- Position: Defender

College career
Years	Team	Apps	(Gls)
1989	NC State Wolfpack		

International career
1987–1995	Canada	30	(0)

Luce Mongrain (born 11 January 1971) is a Canadian soccer player who played as a defender for the Canada women's national soccer team. She was part of the team at the 1995 FIFA Women's World Cup.

== Honours ==
- 2021: Canada Soccer Hall of Fame
