= Brian Robinson (soccer) =

Canadian soccer player (born 1948)

Brian Robinson (born 1948) is a former Canadian national soccer team player. He was born in Victoria, British Columbia.

== Club career ==
Robinson started playing at the age of ten with the Evening Optimist Club in his home town and later starred in the Victoria High School team that reached the B.C. High School final in 1966. At 17 he was playing for Vic West in the Victoria City League where he played for two years before joining Victoria United in the Pacific Coast League. By 1970 he was playing in the Western Canada Soccer League for the Victoria Royals and was a member of the WCSL championship team in that year. While most of his club career was spent in Victoria, where he won a Canadian Championship medal with a team sponsored by the London Boxing Club in 1975, Robinson played the whole of the 1976 season for the Vancouver Whitecaps in the North American Soccer League.

== International career ==
By 1972 his power and quickness took him to the national team and he made his international debut in midfield against the United States in St. John's in a World Cup qualification game. Robinson scored a memorable goal for Canada against Mexico in the Azteca Stadium in 1972. He played 18 times for his country including 14 full internationals.

=== International goals ===
Scores and results list Canada's goal tally first.

#	Date	Venue	Opponent	Score	Result	Competition
1	6 September 1972	Estadio Azteca, Mexico City, Mexico	Mexico	1–1	1–2	1974 FIFA World Cup qualification

In 2006 he was inducted into the Canadian Soccer Hall of Fame.
