= 1931 Dominion of Canada Football Championship =

Tournament details
- Country: Canada

Final positions
- Champions: Westminster Royals FC (3rd title)
- Runners-up: Toronto Scottish FC

The 1931 Dominion of Canada Football Championship was the 16th staging of Canada Soccer's domestic football club competition. Westminster Royals FC won the Challenge Trophy after they beat Toronto Scottish FC with back-to-back wins at Carruthers Park in Winnipeg from 30 July to 3 August 1931.

After winning the British Columbia section, Westminster Royals FC beat Edmonton CNR and Winnipeg Irish FC on the road to the Canadian Final.

This was Westminster's third of four Dominion titles in a nine-year span from 1928 to 1936.
