= 1953 FA Canada Championship =

Tournament details
- Country: Canada

Final positions
- Champions: Westminster Royals FC (5th title)
- Runners-up: Montréal Hakoah FC

The 1953 FA Canada Championship was the 32nd staging of Canada Soccer's domestic football club competition. Westminster Royals FC won the Challenge Trophy after they beat Montréal Hakoah FC in a best-of-three series at Delorimier Stadium in Montréal from 15-18 August 1953.

After winning the British Columbia section, Westminster Royals FC beat Edmonton North Side Legion FC and Winnipeg AN&AF Scottish FC on the road to the Canadian Final.
