= Trevor Harvey (soccer) =

Canadian soccer player (1916–1988)

Personal information
- Full name: Trevor Harvey
- Date of birth: September 7, 1916
- Place of birth: Vancouver, British Columbia, Canada
- Date of death: 24 July 1988 (aged 71)
- Position: Centre half

Youth career
- North Shore Bluebirds

Senior career*
Years	Team	Apps	(Gls)
1936	Westminster Royals FC		
1937	Vancouver Johnston National Storage FC		
1938	Vancouver Excelsior		
1939	North Shore United FC		
1939–1940	Seaforth Highlanders		
1939–1941	North Shore United FC		
1941–1942	Vancouver St. Saviours		
1941–1942	Victoria Machinery Depot		
1942–1949	North Shore United FC		
1950–1951	Westminster Royals FC		
1951–1954	North Shore United FC		
- * Club domestic league appearances and goals

Trevor Harvey (7 September 1916 – 24 July 1988) is a former Canadian soccer player. He was a four-time national champion, winning titles with the Westminster Royals FC (1936), Vancouver Johnston National Storage FC (1937), and North Shore United FC (1938 and 1949). He was posthumously named an honoured member of the Canada Soccer Hall of Fame.

He notably won the Canadian Championship in three successive seasons with three different teams from 1936 to 1938. He was the hero of the 1938 series, a five-game series with Timmins' Dome Mines club.

While he was predominantly a centre half, he could also play just about any position on the forward line, too. In 1942–43, he led the Pacific Coast League in goalscoring (he was the first player to surpass the 20-goal plateau after the league was re-established in 1939-40).

In 1985, Harvey was inducted into the BC Sports Hall of Fame.
