= Dickie Stobbart =

Canadian soccer player

Dick Stobbart
Personal information
- Full name: Richard Stobbart
- Date of birth: 18 December 1891
- Place of birth: Bedlington
- Date of death: 9 November 1952 (aged 60)
- Position: Forward

International career
Years	Team	Apps	(Gls)
1924	Canada	6	(2)

Richard Paul Stobbart (December 18, 1891 – November 9, 1952) known as Dickie Stobbart was a Canadian national soccer team player who was usually positioned as forward. He is considered to be one of the finest half backs in the history of Canadian soccer. He starred for Canada on its 1924 tour of Australia, appearing in all six internationals.

Stobbart was born in Bedlington, Northumberland, England. In 1921 he was a member of the Ladysmith team that lost the national final to Toronto Scottish. However, in 1922 he joined the Nanaimo Wanderers and in 1923 he scored the winning goal from a penalty kick against Montreal C.P.R. to win the National Championship. In 1925 Nanaimo reached the finals but lost to Toronto Ulster United.

In 1928 he joined the Westminster Royals and again reached the finals in the National Championship beating Montreal C.P.R. in a three-game series, scoring one of the Royals six goals in the deciding game. In 1931 he helped the Royals reached the finals again this time beating the Toronto Scottish in a two-game series.

He played 25 seasons before he retired during the 1936-37 season.

After he retired as a player he was named as one of the Players of the Half Century in the 1950 Canadian Press poll. He became the assistant coach of the Vancouver St. Andrews in 1947 when they won the Canadian title. He died in Vancouver on November 9, 1952.

In April 2002 Stobbart was inducted into the Canadian Soccer Hall of Fame.

== International career ==
Stobbart played his first international game with the senior national team on 7 June 1924 in and against Australia (3–2). He only played internationals in June and July 1924, but managed to score twice in six internationals.
