= Harry Manson (soccer) =

First Nations soccer player (1879–1912)

Xul-si-malt, who was given the English name Harry Manson, (1879 – February 10, 1912) was a First Nations soccer player, the first to be inducted into the Canadian Soccer Hall of Fame. He was also inducted into Canada's Sports Hall of Fame in 2015. He broke many racial barriers as one of the first Aboriginal soccer players in the late 1800s and early 1900s. Manson was known for his many abilities and skills in soccer. In fact, he was the only player, of Aboriginal or European descent, to play on all three Nanaimo premier soccer teams.

A member of the Snuneymuxw First Nation, he was born on Vancouver Island. He was recruited by the Nanaimo Thistles in 1898 to play in the provincial championship. In 1903, he was named to the Nanaimo all-star team. Harry Manson and other aboriginal teammates were the first players to compete in a provincial championship alongside their white teammates. As he prepared to take the field, crowds would call him "savage" because of his athleticism. He was also captain of an all-Snuneymuxw soccer team called the Indian Wanderers which won the Nanaimo city championship in 1904. In 1907, with four Snuneymuxw players including Manson, the Nanaimo team won the provincial championship. Local press recognized Manson as one of the best players that Nanaimo has ever produced.

Manson was also a very good baseball player, playing for the Nanaimo Reliance Baseball Club in 1906. He married Lucy Sampson, with whom he had one child. In 1912, while returning from a trip into town to get medicine for his sick infant son, he tried to hop aboard a coal train and was killed when he fell onto the tracks. In Indigenous cultures, when one passes on their spirit name becomes a guide to who they are and how they should be in the world. For Harry Manson, his name Xulsimalt means "One Who Leaves His Mark".

== The Harry Manson Legacy Tournament ==
The Harry Manson Legacy Tournament is a tournament that is open to Aboriginal and Non-Aboriginal men and women to play in. The tournament was set up in 2015 and includes four teams from the First Nation communities in the Vancouver-area, as well as aboriginal students from surrounding urban areas. They hope to overcome racial barriers that are still present in Vancouver and surrounding areas.
