= Jack Whent =

English footballer (1920–1999)

Personal information
- Full name: John Richard Whent
- Date of birth: 3 May 1920
- Place of birth: Darlington, England
- Date of death: 25 August 1999 (aged 79)
- Place of death: Citrus Heights, California, US
- Height: 1.80 m (5 ft 11 in)
- Position: Half back

Senior career*
Years	Team	Apps	(Gls)
1939–1940	Vancouver St Saviour's		
1940–1942	Olympic Club		
1942–1943	Vancouver Boeing FC	0	(0)
1943–1944	Tottenham Hotspur		
1944–1946	Brighton & Hove Albion		
1946–1947	Vancouver St Andrew's FC		
1947–1950	Brighton & Hove Albion	101	(4)
1950–1951	Luton Town	11	(3)
1951–1953	Kettering Town		
1953–1955	Westminster Royals		
- San Francisco Rovers
- San Francisco Mercuries
- * Club domestic league appearances and goals

John Richard Whent (3 May 1920 – 25 August 1999) was an English professional soccer player who made 113 English Football League appearances playing at centre half or wing half for Brighton & Hove Albion and Luton Town. He won two Canadian Championships, with Vancouver St Andrew's in 1947 and the Westminster Royals six years later

== Life and career ==
Whent was born in England, in Darlington, County Durham, and emigrated to Canada at a young age. He also lived in California, playing football for Olympic Club and San Francisco Rovers, before returning to Vancouver where he played for St Saviour's. He served in the Canadian Army during the Second World War, played football as a guest for Tottenham Hotspur, and when he was posted to the Brighton area, signed amateur forms with Brighton & Hove Albion and represented them in the 1945–46 FA Cup. When the war was over, he returned to Canada where he was a member of the 1946–47 Pacific Coast League-winning Vancouver St Andrew's team who in 1987 were inducted into the British Columbia Sports Hall of Fame.

Whent was tempted back to Brighton in 1947, and signed for the club on professional terms. He played regularly, mainly at centre half, and also captained the team as he went on to make 101 appearances in the Football League Third Division South. He moved on to Second Division club Luton Town ahead of the 1950–51 season, as part of the deal that took Jimmy Mulvaney and Peter Walsh to Brighton, but played little. After two seasons with Kettering Town of the Southern League, he returned to Canada where he won his first Challenge Trophy in 1953 with the Westminster Royals. In 1950, Whent was on a 16-man shortlist in a 1950 Canadian Press poll to select the best players of the previous 50 years.

Whent rejoined the Pacific Coast League for the 1953–54 and 1954–55 seasons with the New Westminster Royals. In the fall of 1953, he helped the Royals captured the 1953 Canadian championship.

By 1958, Whent was back in San Francisco playing for an all-star team against a touring Manchester City side. He died in Citrus Heights, California, in 1999 at the age of 79. He was playing for the San Francisco Mercuries as late as 1961.
