= 1952 FA Canada Championship =

Tournament details
- Country: Canada

Final positions
- Champions: Montréal Stelco FC (1st title)
- Runners-up: Westminster Royals FC

The 1952 FA Canada Championship was the 31st staging of Canada Soccer's domestic football club competition. Montréal Stelco FC won the Challenge Trophy after they beat Westminster Royals FC in a best-of-three series at Osborne Stadium in Winnipeg from September 1 to 4, 1952.

After winning the Québec section, Montréal Stelco FC beat Toronto Italo-Canadians and United Weston FC on the road to the Canadian Final.
