= Fred Whittaker (soccer) =

Canadian sportsman

Personal information
- Full name: Frederick John Rennie Whittaker
- Date of birth: April 18, 1923
- Place of birth: Vancouver, British Columbia, Canada
- Date of death: September 29, 2006 (aged 83)
- Place of death: Aldergrove, British Columbia, Canada
- Height: 1.83 m (6 ft 0 in)
- Position: Centre forward

Senior career*
Years	Team	Apps	(Gls)
1940–44	Vancouver St. Saviours		
1944–45	Vancouver Boeing FC		
1945–46	North Shore United FC		
1946–47	Notts County	10	(2)
1947–49	St. Saviours / Vancouver City		
1949–54	North Shore United FC		
1955–56	Vancouver Pilseners		
- * Club domestic league appearances and goals

Frederick John Rennie Whittaker (April 18, 1923 – September 29, 2006) was a Canadian lacrosse and soccer player. He was signed by the English club Notts County in 1946 and scored two goals in ten games for them in that year. Back in Canada he led Vancouver North Shore United to the national championship in 1949 and played eleven times for and coached the British Columbia All-Stars.

In 2002, he was inducted into the Canada Soccer Hall of Fame.
