= BC Sports Hall of Fame =

Hall of Fame and museum in British Columbia, Canada

Coordinates: 49°16′36″N 123°6′43″W

BC Sports Hall of Fame and Museum

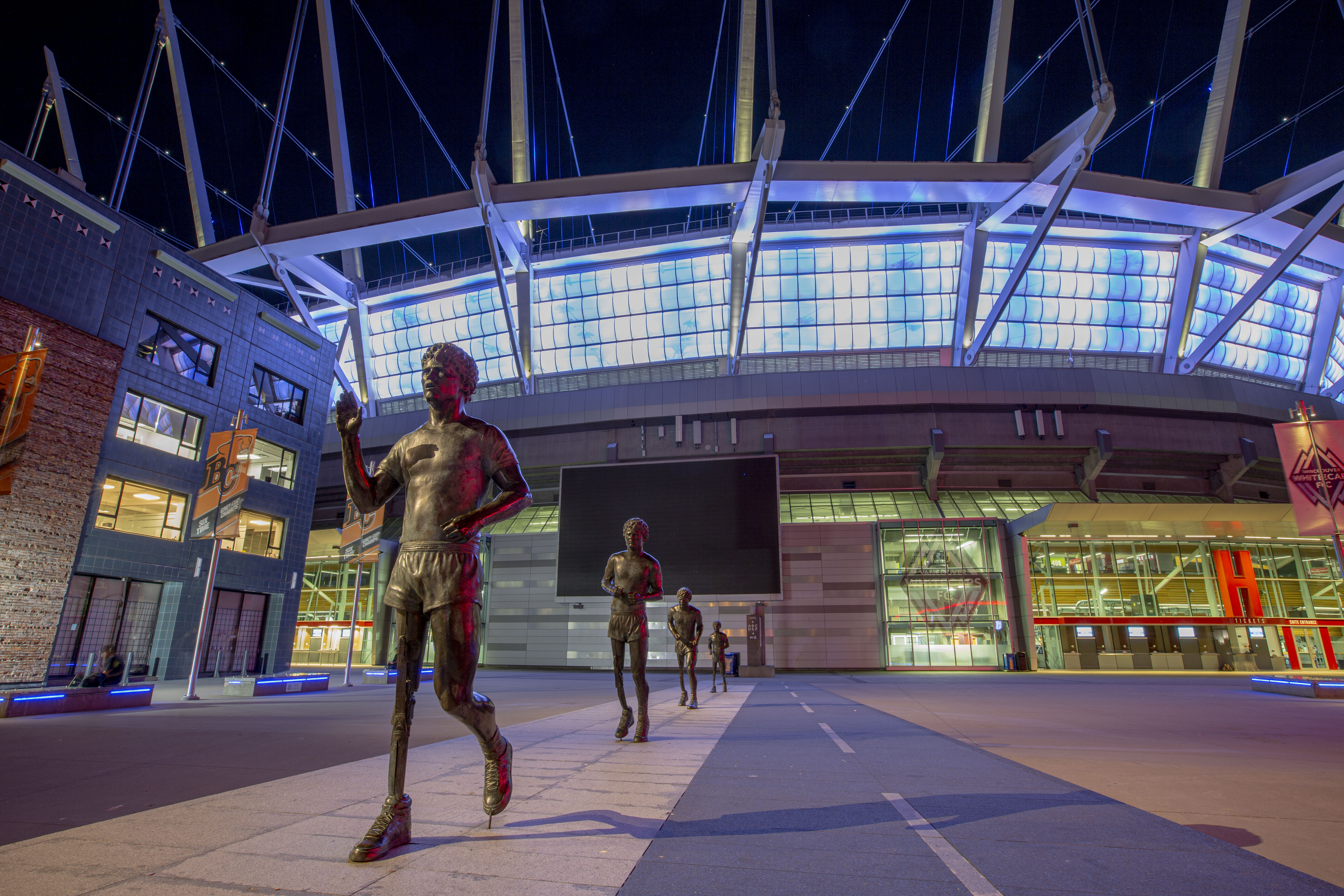
- Established: 1966; 60 years ago
- Location: Gate A, BC Place, 777 Pacific Boulevard South, Vancouver, British Columbia; Canada V6B 4Y8
- Type: Non-profit
- Founder: Eric Whitehead
- Director: Jason Beck
- Chairperson: Tom Mayenknecht
- Curator: Jason Beck
- Public transit access: Stadium-Chinatown; Yaletown–Roundhouse
- Website: bcsportshall.com

The BC Sports Hall of Fame is a museum located in the BC Place stadium, at Gate A, the main entrance to the stadium, in Vancouver, British Columbia, Canada. It collects, preserves, studies and interprets materials that relate to British Columbia's sport history, and allows researchers, writers, media members and sport historians to gain access to and appreciate BC's sporting heritage.

The organization has amassed an extensive artifact and archival collection of artifacts and archival documents related to sports. The museum features galleries on BC sportspeople Terry Fox, Rick Hansen and Greg Moore. It also has several multi-sport galleries including a gallery on Aboriginal sport, the BC professional sports teams, the 1954 British Empire and Commonwealth Games, and "In Her Footsteps", a gallery focused on women in sport.

== History ==
The BC Sports Hall of Fame was founded in 1966 by Eric Whitehead and other groups of sports-minded individuals in British Columbia. In August of that year the Hall officially opened in the BC Pavilion on the Pacific National Exhibition grounds.

In 1993, the BC Sports Hall of Fame opened in BC Place.

The BC Sports Hall of Fame re-opened in January 2012 after having been closed to the public for a 20-month period while the new roof was being installed on BC Place Stadium. During the construction artifacts from the museum were loaned out to institutions around the province. The Hall then opened a new Vancouver 2010 Gallery with the world's largest and broadest collection of 2010 Olympic and Paralympic artifacts, as well as a new Hall of Champions, the Hall's signature gallery.

In 2017 a replica of the news desk from the Sports Page television show was put on display in commemoration of its 40th anniversary.

The Hall was closed from May to July 2026 because the building was used by FIFA as a World Cup media centre. Hall of Fame curator Jason Beck criticised the decision as a "massive missed opportunity" to showcase a local landmark while international visitors were in Vancouver for the World Cup. To make space in the Hall for media operations, thousands of artifacts and archival items were moved to a storage space in the lower level of BC Place. The building formally reopened on August 1.

== Induction ==
Since 1966, the BC Sports Hall of Fame has inducted 406 individuals and 63 teams. Once inducted, these individuals become known as Honoured Members and the teams are known as Honoured Teams of the BC Sports Hall of Fame. The five major induction categories, each with its own set of criteria, are Athlete, Builder, Pioneer, Media and Team.

=== Induction process ===
Any individual or association may submit a nomination except current members of the selection committee. A member of the board of trustees who submits a nomination may not vote on that nomination if and when it is brought to the board of trustees for approval.

Each year, nominations are accepted until June 30.

Each nomination is eligible for three consecutive years. If at the end of three consecutive years of eligibility, a nomination has not been selected for induction, the nomination must sit inactive for a period of one year after which the nomination can be resubmitted.

=== Induction Gala ===
The BC Sports Hall of Fame hosts an annual Induction Gala, the official induction and public recognition ceremony, attracting over 1000 guests. The 50th Induction Gala was held on May 23, 2019, at the Vancouver Convention Centre.

== Inductees ==
=== A ===
==== All round ====
- Herb Capozzi was inducted as a Builder in 2007.
- Bill Chandler was inducted as an Athlete in 1966.
- Reg Clarkson was inducted as an Athlete in 1974.
- Lorne Davies was inducted as a Builder in 2010.
- Faye (Burnham) Eccleston was inducted as an Athlete in 1966.
- John Hugh (Jack) Gillis was inducted as a Pioneer in 2006.
- Bob Hindmarch was inducted as a Builder in 2006.
- Fred Hume was inducted as a Builder in 1966.
- Ted Hunt was inducted as an Athlete in 1972.
- Marion Lay was inducted as a Builder in 2005.
- Wallace Mayers was inducted as an Athlete in 1966.
- Colleen McCulloch was inducted as an Athlete in 2001.
- Lou Moro was inducted as a Builder in 1995.
- Robert Osborne was inducted as a Builder in 1967.
- Doug Peden was inducted as an Athlete in 1967.
- Jack Pomfret was inducted as an Athlete in 1971.
- Marilyn Pomfret was inducted as a Builder in 2004
- Sandy Robertson was inducted as an Athlete in 1971.
- Stanley Smith was inducted as a Builder in 1966.
- Shirly Ann Topley was inducted as an Athlete in 1998.
- Denny Veitch was inducted as an Builder in 2015.
- Peter Webster was inducted as a Builder in 2007.
- Ruth Wilson was inducted as a Builder in 1966.
- Eric Whitehead was inducted as a Builder in 1977.
- Eleanor (Cave) Whyte was inducted as a Builder in 1987.

==== Archery ====
- Dorothy (Wagar) Lidstone was inducted as an Athlete in 1981.

==== Athletics ====
- Ann Clark Ayers was inducted as a Pioneer in 2010.

=== B ===
==== Badminton ====
- Claire (Ehman) Lovett was inducted as an Athlete in 1975.
- Wayne Macdonnell was inducted as an Athlete in 1993.
- John Samis was inducted as an Athlete in 1972.
- Claire (Backhouse) Sharpe was inducted as an Athlete in 1997.
- Daryl Thompson was inducted as a Builder in 1984.
- Margaret (Taylor) Turner was inducted as an Athlete in 1967.
- Eileen (George) Underhill was inducted as an Athlete in 1970.
- Jack (John) Underhill was inducted as an Athlete in 1969.

==== Baseball ====
- Japanese-Canadian baseball team Asahi were inducted as a Pioneer in 2005.
- Andy Bilesky was inducted as a Builder in 1984.
- Ted Bowsfield was inducted as an Athlete in 1980.
- Bob Brown was inducted as a Builder in 1966.
- Arnold (Arnie) Hallgren was inducted as an Athlete in 2005.
- Ryan Dempster was inducted as an Athlete in 2018.

==== Basketball ====
- 1930 UBC Senior A (Women) was inducted as a Team in 1981.
- 1936–1937 UBC Thunderbirds (Men) was inducted as a Team in 1980.
- 1944–1945 Hedlunds (Women) was inducted as a Team in 1989.
- 1945–1946 UBC Thunderbirds (Men) was inducted as a Team in 1984.
- 1945–1946 Victoria Dominoes (Men) was inducted as a Team in 1978.
- 1948–1949 Vancouver Clover Leafs (Men) was inducted as a Team in 1993.
- 1954–1955 Vancouver Eilers was inducted as a Team in 1991.
- 1955 Alberni Athletic (Men) was inducted as a Team in 2001.
- 1966 IGA Grocers (Men) was inducted as a Team in 1997.
- George "Porky" Andrews was inducted as an Athlete in 1967.
- Norm Baker was inducted as an Athlete in 1966.
- Jim Bardsley was inducted as an Athlete in 1978.
- Rita (Panasis) Bell was inducted as an Athlete in 1975.
- Art Chapman was inducted as an Athlete in 1969.
- Chuck Chapman was inducted as an Athlete in 1968.
- Norm Gloag was inducted as a Builder in 1975.
- Eli Pasquale was inducted as an Athlete in 2004.
- Roy Phipps was inducted as an Athlete in 1966.
- Bev Smith was inducted as an Athlete in 2003.
- J.A. "Wink" Willox was inducted as a Builder in 1985.
- Ken Wright was inducted as a Builder in 1983.

==== Boxing ====
- Herbert A. Lowes was inducted as a Builder in 1990.
- Harold Mann was inducted as an Athlete in 2006.
- Jimmy McLarnin was inducted as an Athlete in 1966.
- Tom Paonessa was inducted as a Pioneer in 2001.
- William Townsend was inducted as an Athlete in 1966.
- Dale Walters was inducted as an Athlete in 2006.
- Len Walters was inducted as an Athlete in 1995.

In 2010, a British Columbia Amateur Boxing Hall of Fame was started, and the 15 inductees included Harold Mann and Dale Walters. In 2011, the ten inductees included Tommy Paonessa and Len Walter.

=== C ===
==== Canoeing ====
- Hugh Fisher was inducted as an Athlete in 1985.

==== Curling ====
- 1948 Frenchy D'Amour Rink (Men) was inducted as a Team in 1980.
- 1964 Lyall Dagg Rink (Men) was inducted as a Team in 1976.
- 1985 Linda Moore Rink (Women) was inducted as a Team in 1990.
- 1987 Pat Sanders Rink (Women) was inducted as a Team in 1996.
- 1994 Rick Folk Rink (Men) was inducted as a Team in 1995.
- 2000 Kelley Law (Women) & Greg McAulay (Men) Curling Teams were both inducted as Teams in 2002.
- Frank Avery was inducted as a Builder in 1970.
- Bernie Sparkes was inducted as an Athlete in 1995.
- Reg Stone was inducted as an Athlete in 1984.
- Roy Stone was inducted as an Athlete in 1984.

==== Cycling ====
- Lorne "Ace" Atkinson was inducted as a Builder in 1997.
- Jim Davies was inducted as a Builder in 1972.
- William "Torchy" Peden was inducted as an Athlete in 1966.
- Morris Robinson was inducted as a Pioneer in 2002.
- Roger Sumner was inducted as a Builder in 2003.
- Brian Walton was inducted as an Athlete in 2006.

=== D ===
==== Diving ====
- George Athans was inducted as an Athlete in 1968.
- Tom Dinsley was inducted as an Athlete in 1979.
- Lynda (Adams) Hunt was inducted as a Builder in 1970.
- Irene MacDonald was inducted as an Athlete in 1972.

=== F ===
==== Field hockey ====
- Moira (Christie) Colbourne was inducted as a Builder in 1985.
- Jenny John was inducted as a Builder in 2010.
- Barbara "Bim" Schrodt was inducted as a Builder in 1999.
- Harry Warren was inducted as a Builder in 1990.

==== Figure skating ====
- Linda (Scharfe) Brauckmann was inducted as a Builder in 1997.
- Karen (Magnussen) Cella was inducted as an Athlete in 1972.
- Victor Kraatz was inducted as an Athlete in 2004.
- E.V. "Billie" Mitchell was inducted as a Builder in 1998.
- Soper Ice Dance Pair (Barry and Louise Soper) were inducted as Athletes and as a Team in 1979.
- Tracy Wilson was inducted as an Athlete in 1991.

==== Football ====
- 1964 BC Lions were inducted as a Team in 1986.
- 1985 BC Lions were inducted as a Team in 2000.
- 1994 BC Lions were inducted as a Team in 2010.
- Bob Ackles was inducted as a Builder in 2004.
- Byron (By) Bailey was inducted as an Athlete in 1975.
- Tom Brown was inducted as an Athlete in 1987.
- Jack Farley was inducted as a Builder in 1996.
- Norm Fieldgate was inducted as an Athlete in 1970.
- Willie "The Wisp" Fleming was inducted as an Athlete in 1998.
- W.T. (Tom) Hinton was inducted as an Athlete in 1992.
- Joe Kapp was inducted as an Athlete in 1999.
- Sean Millington was inducted as an Athlete in 2010.
- Lui Passaglia was inducted as an Athlete in 2001.
- Paul Rowe was inducted as an Athlete in 1981.
- Annis Stukus was inducted as a Builder in 1998.
- Al Wilson was inducted as an Athlete in 1997.
- Jim Young was inducted as an Athlete in 1994.

=== G ===
==== Golf ====
- 1994 Dunhill Cup Team was inducted as a Team in 1999.
- David Black was inducted as an Athlete in 1966.
- Ken Black was inducted as an Athlete in 1966.
- Ernest Edgar Brown was inducted as a Builder in 2003.
- John Johnston was inducted as an Athlete in 1971.
- Stan Leonard was inducted as an Athlete in 1966.
- Bill Mawhinney was inducted as an Athlete in 1970.
- Walter McElroy was inducted as an Athlete in 1980.
- Gail Moore was inducted as an Athlete in 2004.
- Doug Roxburgh was inducted as an Athlete in 1995.
- Violet (Pooley) Sweeny was inducted as an Athlete in 1974.
- Margaret (Sutcliffe) Todd was inducted as an Athlete in 1973.

==== Gymnastics ====
- Philip Delesalle was inducted as an Athlete in 1994.
- Gladys Hartley was inducted as a Builder in 2002.

=== H ===
==== High jump ====
- Shirley Olafsson was inducted as a Pioneer in 2004.

==== Horse racing ====
- Hedley Woodhouse was inducted as an Athlete in 1979.

==== Hydroplane racing ====
- Jim Hutchison was inducted as a Builder in 1984..

=== I ===
==== Ice hockey ====
- 1914–1915 Vancouver Millionaires was inducted as a Team in 1977.
- 1924–1925 Victoria Cougars was inducted as a Team in 1977.
- 1994–1995 Kamloops Blazers was inducted as a Team in 2016.
- 1935–1936 Kimberley Dynamiters was inducted as a Team in 1976.
- 1954–1955 Penticton V's was inducted as a Team in 1976.
- 1900–1918 Rossland Ladies Hockey was inducted as a Team in 2018.
- 1938–1939 Trail Smoke Eaters was inducted as a Team in 1976.
- 1960–1961 Trail Smoke Eaters was inducted as a Team in 1976.
- 1945–1946 Vancouver Canucks was inducted as a Team in 2012.
- 1968–1969 Vancouver Canucks was inducted as a Team in 2006.
- 2002 Canadian Olympic Hockey Team (Men) was inducted as a Team in 2003.
- 2010 Canadian Olympic Hockey Team (Men) was inducted as a Team in 2011.
- Glenn Anderson was inducted as an Athlete in 2001.
- Mike Buckna was inducted as a Builder in 1989.
- John Ferguson, Sr. was inducted as an Athlete in 1978.
- Frank Fredrickson was inducted as an Athlete in 1983.
- Danny Gare was inducted as an Athlete in 2008.
- Ken Holland was inducted as a Builder in 2019.
- Lloyd Gilmour was inducted as a Builder in 2002.
- Paul Kariya was inducted as an Athlete in 2015.
- Orland Kurtenbach was inducted as an Athlete in 1997.
- Larry Kwong was inducted as an Athlete in 2013.
- Trevor Linden was inducted as an Athlete in 2011.
- Duncan "Mickey" Mackay was inducted as an Athlete in 1989.
- Cesare Maniago was inducted as an Athlete in 1996.
- Seth Martin was inducted as an Athlete in 1988.
- Ivan McLelland was inducted as an Athlete in 2005.
- Andy Moog was inducted as an Athlete in 2003.
- Jim Morris was inducted as an Athlete in 1974.
- Cam Neely was inducted as an Athlete in 2000.
- Scott Niedermayer was inducted as an Athlete in 2014.
- Bob Nicholson was inducted as a Builder in 2014.
- Fred Page was inducted as a Builder in 2001.
- Frank Patrick was inducted as a Builder in 1966.
- Joseph Patrick was inducted as a Pioneer in 1998.
- Lester Patrick was inducted as a Builder in 1966.
- Lynn Patrick was inducted as an Athlete in 1968.
- Murray "Muzz" Patrick was inducted as an Athlete in 1968.
- Mark Recchi was inducted as an Athlete in 2017.
- Cliff Ronning was inducted as an Athlete in 2018.
- Darcy Rota was inducted as an Athlete in 2002.
- Joe Sakic was inducted as an Athlete in 2010.
- Daniel Sedin was inducted as an Athlete in 2019.
- Henrik Sedin was inducted as an Athlete in 2019.
- Rob Shick was inducted as a Builder in 2018.
- Stan Smyl was inducted as an Athlete in 2005.
- Harold Snepsts was inducted as an Athlete in 2006.
- Fred "Cyclone" Taylor was inducted as an Athlete in 1966.
- Ivan Temple was inducted as a Builder in 1984.
- Ron Toigo was inducted as a recipient of the W.A.C. Bennett Award in 2019.
- Jim Watson was inducted as an Athlete in 2002.
- Joe Watson was inducted as an Athlete in 2002.

=== J ===
==== Judo ====
- Doug Rogers was inducted as an Athlete in 1976.
- Yuzuru "Jim" Kojima was inducted as a Builder in 2023.
- Shigetaka "Steve" Sasaki was inducted as a Builder in 1995.

=== L ===
==== Lacrosse ====
- 1908 New Westminster Salmonbellies Field Lacrosse Team was inducted as a Team in 2003.
- 1936's North Shore Indians was inducted as a Team in 1999.
- 1964 Vancouver Carling Lacrosse Club was inducted as a Team in 2005.
- Jack Bionda was inducted as an Athlete in 1998.
- John Crookall was inducted as an Athlete in 1967.
- William Dickinson was inducted as a Builder in 1967.
- Bill Dickson was inducted as a Builder in 1967.
- James Douglas was inducted as an Athlete in 1967.
- Merv Ferguson was inducted as a Builder in 1978.
- Douglas Fletcher was inducted as a Builder in 1968.
- Wayne Goss was inducted as an Athlete in 1989.
- Cliff "Doughy" Spring was inducted as an Athlete in 1967.
- Alex "Dad" Turnbull was inducted as an Athlete in 1967.

=== M ===
==== Media ====
- Steve Armitage was inducted in 2006.
- Jim Coleman was inducted in 1998.
- Jim Cox was inducted in 2004.
- Bill Cunningham was inducted in 1983.
- Greg Douglas was inducted in 2010.
- Bill Good, Sr. was inducted in 2002.
- Jim Kearney was inducted in 1999.
- Clancy Loranger was inducted in 2003.
- Ted Reynolds was inducted in 1998.
- Jim Robson was inducted in 2000.
- Jack Short was inducted in 2001.
- Jim Taylor was inducted in 2005.

==== Motor cycling ====
- Trevor Deeley was inducted as an Athlete in 2000.

==== Motor sports ====
- Greg Moore was inducted as an Athlete in 2000.

=== R ===
==== Rhythmic gymnastics ====
- Lori Fung Methorst was inducted as an Athlete in 1985.

==== Rodeo ====
- Mel Hyland was inducted as an Athlete in 1999.
- Ken McLean was inducted as an Athlete in 1973.

==== Rowing ====
- 1924 VRC Coxless Fours (Men) was inducted as a Team in 1977.
- 1932 VRC Double Sculls (Men) was inducted as a Team in 1980.
- 1954 UBC/VRC Eights (Men) was inducted as a Team in 1966.
- 1956 UBC/VCR Coxless Fours (Men) was inducted as a Team in 1966.
- 1956 UBC/VCR Eights (Men) was inducted as a Team in 1976.
- 1960 UBC/VCR Eights (Men) was inducted as a Team in 1977.
- 1984 Olympic Eights (Men) was inducted as a Team in 1985.
- 1992 BC Members, Olympic Teams (Men & Women) were inducted as a Team in 1994.
- Kathleen Heddle was inducted as an Athlete in 2003.
- George Hungerford was inducted as an Athlete in 1966.
- Bob Johnston was inducted as an Athlete in 1966.
- Silken Laumann was inducted as an Athlete in 2004.
- Dick McClure was inducted as a Builder in 1999.
- Derek Porter was inducted as an Athlete in 1996.
- Frank Read was inducted as a Builder in 1996.
- Tricia Smith was inducted as an Athlete in 1992.
- Nelles Stacey was inducted as a Builder in 1966.
- Adam Kreek was inducted as a Team in 2014.

==== Rugby ====
- Jack Bain was inducted as an Athlete in 1977.
- Don Burgess was inducted as a Builder in 2000.
- Barrie Burnham was inducted as an Athlete in 1998.
- Hans De Goede was inducted as an Athlete in 2007.
- Spence McTavish was inducted as an Athlete in 2010.
- Douglas (Buzz) Moore was inducted as an Athlete in 1967.
- Robert Spray was inducted as a Builder in 1975.
- Reginald Woodward was inducted as a Builder in 1967.

=== S ===
==== Sailing ====
- 1972 Olympic Sailing Crew was inducted as a Team in 1989.
- 1994 Star Class Crew was inducted as a Team in 1998.
- Don Martin was inducted as a Builder in 2012.

==== Shooting ====
- Frank Opsal was inducted as an Athlete in 1976.
- Gunnar Westling was inducted as an Athlete in 1974.

==== Ski jumping ====
- Nels Nelsen was inducted as an Athlete in 1984.

==== Skiing ====
- Greg Athans was inducted in 2014.
- Rob Boyd was inducted as an Athlete in 2003.
- Sarah Burke was inducted as an Athlete in 2014.
- Emily Brydon was inducted as an Athlete in 2019.
- Dave Irwin was inducted as an Athlete in 1989.
- Kerrin Lee-Gartner was inducted as an Athlete in 1994.
- Ashleigh McIvor was inducted as an Athlete in 2012.
- Gerry (Sorensen) Lenihan was inducted as an Athlete in 1986.
- Dave Murray was inducted as an Athlete in 1987.
- Nancy (Greene) Raine was inducted as an Athlete in 1969.
- Marielle Thompson was inducted as an Athlete in 2018.

==== Snooker ====
- Cliff Thorburn was inducted as an Athlete in 1995.

==== Snowboarding ====
- Ross Rebagliati was inducted as an Athlete in 2005.
- Maëlle Ricker was inducted as an Athlete in 2011.

==== Soccer ====
- 1927–28 New Westminster Royals was inducted as a Team in 1979.
- 1933 Chinese Students was inducted as a Team in 2011.
- 1946–47 St. Andrews was inducted as a Team in 1987.
- 1979 Vancouver Whitecaps was inducted as a Team in 1988.
- 1989 Vancouver 86ers was inducted as a Team in 2004.
- 2004 Vancouver Whitecaps Women's Soccer Team was inducted as a Team in 2004.
- 2012 Canadian Olympic Soccer Team (women) was inducted as a Team in 2015.
- Jack Cowan was inducted as an Athlete in 1974.
- Geri Donnelly was inducted as an Athlete in 2016.
- Craig Forrest was inducted as an Athlete in 2007.
- David Fryatt was inducted as an Athlete in 1983.
- Trevor Harvey was inducted as an Athlete in 1985.
- Dan Kulai was inducted as a Builder in 1970.
- Bob Lenarduzzi was inducted as an Athlete in 1992.
- Harry Manson was inducted as a Pioneer in 2016.
- Domenic Mobilio was inducted as an Athlete in 2008.
- Andrea Neil was inducted as an Athlete in 2012.
- Ken Pears was inducted as an Athlete in 1986.
- Brian Philley was inducted as an Athlete in 1997.
- John Richardson was inducted as a Builder in 1966.
- John Russell was inducted as a Builder in 1966.
- Aubrey Sanford was inducted as an Athlete in 1971.
- Jimmy Spencer was inducted as an Athlete in 1973.
- Gordon "Gogie" Stewart was inducted as an Athlete in 1988.
- Stan Stronge was inducted as a Builder in 1980.
- David Turner was inducted as an Athlete in 1966.
- Carl Valentine was inducted as an Athlete in 2016.
- Tony Waiters was inducted as a Builder in 2019.
- Bruce Wilson was inducted as an Athlete in 1990.
- Quene Yip was inducted as a Pioneer in 1998.

==== Softball ====
- 1976 Victoria Bate Construction (Men) was inducted as a Team in 1990.
- 1978 Doc's Blues Women's Softball was inducted as a Team in 2014.
- Rosemary Fuller was inducted as an Athlete in 1991.
- Bernard "Buster" Moberg was inducted as an Athlete in 2012.
- Glen Todd was inducted as a Builder in 2008

==== Speed skating ====
- Eden Donatelli Green was inducted as an Athlete in 2000.
- Neal Marshall was inducted as an Athlete in 2002.
- Denny Morrison was inducted as an Athlete in 2015.

==== Squash ====
- George Morfitt was inducted as a Builder in 1988.

==== Swimming ====
- 1965 Ocean Falls Amateur Swimming Club was inducted as a Team in 2013.
- Leslie Cliff was inducted as an Athlete in 1978.
- Michael Edgson was inducted as an Athlete in 2012.
- Howard Firby was inducted as an Athlete in 1977.
- George Gate was inducted as an Athlete in 1986.
- Cheryl Gibson was inducted as an Athlete in 2010.
- Donna-Marie Gurr was inducted as an Athlete in 1987.
- Brent Hayden was inducted as an Athlete in 2013.
- Wendy (Cook) Hogg was inducted as an Athlete in 1990.
- Helen (Stewart) Hunt was inducted as an Athlete in 1968.
- Ralph Hutton was inducted as an Athlete in 1973.
- Ron Jacks was inducted as an Athlete in 1992.
- Tom Johnson was inducted as a Builder in 2018.
- Audrey (Griffin) Kieran was inducted as an Athlete in 1971.
- Bill Mahony was inducted as an Athlete in 1980.
- Mary (Stewart) McIlwaine was inducted as an Athlete in 1966.
- Archie McKinnon was inducted as a Builder in 1966.
- Joan (Langdon) McLagan was inducted as an Athlete in 1988.
- Ann (Mundigel) Meraw was inducted as a Builder in 1985.
- Percy Norman was inducted as a Builder in 1967.
- Pamela Rai was inducted as an Athlete in 1993.
- Bruce Robertson was inducted as an Athlete in 1978.
- Peter Salmon was inducted as an Athlete in 1984.
- Shannon Smith was inducted as an Athlete in 1983.
- Deryk Snelling was inducted as a Builder in 2006.
- Elaine Tanner was inducted as an Athlete in 1969.

==== Synchronized swimming ====
- Donalda Smith was inducted as a Builder in 1992.

=== T ===
==== Taekwondo ====
- Chang Keun Choi was inducted as a Pioneer in 2017.

==== Tennis ====
- Tony Bardsley was inducted as an Athlete in 2007.
- Edward Cardinall was inducted as a Builder in 1966.
- Grant Connell was inducted as an Athlete in 1999.
- Helen Kelesi was inducted as an Athlete in 2008.
- Marjorie Leeming was inducted as an Athlete in 1977.
- Lorne Main was inducted as an Athlete in 1975.
- Robert Powell was inducted as a Pioneer in 2014.
- Bernie Schwengers was inducted as an Athlete in 1966.
- Jack Wright was inducted as an Athlete in 1966.

==== Track and field ====
- Lillian (Palmer) Alderson was inducted as an Athlete in 1969.
- Stephanie (Berto) Berkun was inducted as an Athlete in 1989.
- Debbie Brill was inducted as an Athlete in 1989.
- Isabell Cavallin was inducted as a Builder in 1996.
- Angela Chalmers was inducted as an Athlete in 2004.
- William Chandler was inducted as an Athlete in 1966
- Doug Clement was inducted as a Builder in 2004.
- Charmaine Crooks was inducted as an Athlete in 2003.
- Patricia (Jones) Dalziel was inducted as an Athlete in 1991.
- Graeme Fell was inducted as an Athlete in 2004.
- Duncan Gillis was inducted as an Athlete in 1967.
- Jack Harrison was inducted as a Pioneer in 2000.
- Bruce Humber was inducted as a Builder in 1969.
- Harry Jerome was inducted as an Athlete in 1966.
- Greg Joy was inducted as an Athlete in 1986.
- Willi Krause was inducted as a Builder in 1981.
- Patty Loverock was inducted in 1986.
- Duncan McNaughton was inducted as an Athlete in 1966.
- Bill Parnell was inducted as an Athlete in 1970.
- Irene Piotrowski was inducted as an Athlete in 1993.
- Frederick Rowell was inducted as a Builder in 1992.
- Dave Steen was inducted as an Athlete in 1991.
- Don Steen was inducted as a Builder in 2003.
- Jane Swan was inducted as a Builder in 2005.
- Lloyd Swindells was inducted as a Builder in 1976.
- Mary (Frizzell) Thomasson was inducted as a Pioneer in 2007.
- Lynn (Kanuka) Williams was inducted as an Athlete in 1999.
- Percy Williams was inducted as an Athlete in 1966.
- Harold Wright was inducted as a Builder in 1979.
- Thelma Wright was inducted as an Athlete in 2000.

==== Triathlon ====
- Lori Bowden was inducted as an Athlete in 2009.
- Peter Reid was inducted as an Athlete in 2013.
- Jo-Anne Ritchie was inducted as an Athlete in 2001.
- Simon Whitfield was inducted as an Athlete in 2002.
- Les McDonald was inducted as a Builder in 2009.

=== V ===
==== Volleyball ====
- Carole Bishop was inducted as an Athlete in 1988.
- Victor Lindal was inducted as a Builder in 2001.

=== W ===
==== Water skiing ====
- George Athans was inducted as an Athlete in 1976.

==== Weightlifting ====
- Doug Hepburn was inducted as an Athlete in 1966.

==== Wheelchair athletics ====
- Rick Hansen was inducted as an Athlete in 2007.
- Eugene Reimer was inducted as an Athlete in 2002.

==== Wheelchair basketball ====
- Marni Abbott-Peter was inducted as an Athlete in 2007.

==== Wheelchair rugby ====
- Richard Peter was inducted as an Athlete in 2010.

==== Whitewater/slalom kayaking ====
- David Ford was inducted as an Athlete in 2005.

==== Wrestling ====
- Carol Huynh was inducted as an Athlete in 2009.
- Daniel Igali was inducted as an Athlete in 2001.
- Mike Jones was inducted as an Athlete in 2011.
- Bob Molle was inducted as an Athlete in 1999.
- Paul Nemeth was inducted as a Builder in 1990.
- Chris Wilson was inducted as an Athlete in 1998.

==== W.A.C. Bennett Award ====
- Nat Bailey was the recipient of the award in 2003.
- Peter J.G. Bentley was the recipient of the award in 1999.
- May Brown was the recipient of the award in 2012.
- Bill Cunningham was the recipient of the award in 1983.
- Jack Diamond was the recipient of the award in 1989.
- Terry Fox was the recipient of the award in 1980.
- John Furlong was the recipient of the award in 2004.
- Arthur Griffitjs was the recipient of the award in 2016.
- Frank Griffiths, Sr. was the recipient of the award in 1997.
- Rick Hansen was the recipient of the award in 1987.
- Ok'wilagame' was the recipient of the award in 2018.
- John Wilson (Jack) Poole was the recipient of the award in 2005.
- Pat Quinn was the recipient of the award in 2013.
- Eugene D. Reimer was the recipient of the award in 1993.
- Gordon Shrum was the recipient of the award in 2008.
- Erwin Swangard was the recipient of the award in 2014.
- Ron Toigo was the recipient of the award in 2019.
- Franz Wilhelmsen was the recipient of the award in 1998.
- C.N. "Chunky" Woodward was the recipient of the award in 1986.
- Marty Zlotnik was the recipient of the award in 2011.
