= Surrey United SC =

Surrey United Soccer Club
- Full name: Surrey United Soccer Club
- Nickname: SUSC
- Founded: 1968
- Stadium: Cloverdale Athletic Park
- Coach: Jeff Clarke
- League: BC Soccer
- Website: http://www.surreyunitedsoccer.com/
Home colours	Away colours

Surrey United Soccer Club is a Canadian amateur soccer club based in the Cloverdale area in Surrey, British Columbia, Canada. The club was founded in 1968. The senior men's team goes by the name Surrey United Firefighters and plays in the Fraser Valley Soccer League.

== History ==
The club was formed in 1968.

=== Surrey United Soccer Club ===
Surrey United is one of the largest soccer clubs in the province of British Columbia with 4,400 mini, youth, and adult players.

Currently, they have a BCSPL franchise at the highest level of youth soccer in the province and levels of play for all ages 4-adult. They are a CSA Youth Club License holder, one of the first in Canada in 2019.

== Stadium ==
The club plays its home matches at Cloverdale Athletic Park, which has been Surrey United's home from 1999. The team's colors are red, black and white.

== Year-by-year Surrey United Firefighters Team ==
Year	Division	League	Reg. season	Playoffs	Open Canada Cup
1999	4	PCSL	2nd		did not qualify
2000	4	PCSL	8th		did not qualify
2001	4	PCSL	5th		did not qualify
2002	4	PCSL	8th		did not qualify
2003	4	PCSL	6th		did not qualify
2004	4	PCSL	8th		did not qualify
2005	4	PCSL	4th, South	did not qualify	did not qualify
2006	4	PCSL	10th		did not qualify
2007	4	PCSL	8th		did not qualify
2008	4	PCSL	2nd		did not qualify
2009	4	PCSL			

== Honours ==
=== Surrey United ===
See also external links.

- Sheila Anderson Memorial (Challenge) Cup
  - Winners (1): 2001
- J. F. Kennedy Trophy
  - Winners (1):1999

=== Vancouver Firefighters ===
- Canadian Challenge Trophy:
  - Winners (4): 1965, 1973, 1983, 1990
  - Runners-up (1): 1961
- J.F. Kennedy Trophy:
  - Winner (1): 1962

=== Surrey United Firefighters ===
- Canadian Challenge Trophy:
  - Runners-up (1): 2013

== Stadia ==
- Cloverdale Athletic Park; Surrey, British Columbia (1968–present)
