= 2024 Challenge Trophy =

100th edition of amateur cup competition in Canadian soccer

2024 Canada Soccer National Championships
- 2024 Toyota National Championships; French: Championnats nationaux Toyota 2024

Tournament details
- Country: Canada
- Dates: 9–14 October 2024
- Teams: 10

Final positions
- Champions: (Ontario Soccer Association) Gloucester Celtic FC (3rd title)
- Runners-up: (Soccer Nova Scotia) Suburban FC
- Third place: (British Columbia Soccer Association) Coquitlam Metro-Ford SC

Tournament statistics
- Matches played: 25
- Goals scored: 83 (3.32 per match)
- Attendance: 1,827 (73 per match)

Awards
- Best player: (Ontario Soccer Association) MVP Stefan Karajovanovic
- All statistics correct as of 14 October 2024. Goals scored in penalty kicks are excluded from statistics.

The 2024 Canada Soccer National Championships (officially the Toyota National Championships for sponsorship reasons) was the 100th staging of Canada Soccer's amateur football club competition. Gloucester Celtic FC won the Challenge Trophy after they beat Suburban FC in the Canadian Final at Newton Athletic Field in Surrey on 14 October 2024.

Ontario's Gloucester Celtic FC won 1-0 in the Canadian Final to lift the Challenge Trophy for the third time in 12 years (also the second time in three years). Joey Kewin scored the lone goal.

Ten teams qualified to the final week of the 2024 National Championships in Surrey. Each team played four group matches before the medal and ranking matches on the last day. An Ontario team reached the Canadian Final for the fifth consecutive year, the longest such streak by any member association since British Columbia teams made six straight appearances between 1982 and 1987.

On the road to the 2024 National Championships, Gloucester Celtic FC beat Scarborough GS United in the 2024 Ontario Cup Final.

== Host selection ==
The bidding procedure to host the 2022, 2023, and 2024 Challenge and Jubilee Trophy competitions was officially opened by Canada Soccer via request for proposal submissions on 12 August 2020. Bidding for the 2024 tournament was appended to a previously existing procedure for the 2022 and 2023 competitions, which had been originally issued on 7 February 2020 but suspended due to the COVID-19 pandemic.

On 18 March 2021, the city of Surrey — who had submitted a bid as part of their sports tourism strategy in partnership with the local Surrey Football Club — were officially awarded hosting rights by Canada Soccer.

== Format and entrants ==
Each of Canada Soccer's thirteen member associations were invited to nominate a provincial or territorial representation team for the tournament, with teams generally earning the nomination by qualifying through a preliminary series such as a league competition, open cup, playoff, or single elimination tournament. Based on the number of provincial and territorial entries received, Canada Soccer's Competition Committee determined the competition format — which in this case, also meant awarding a host and additional team entry to ensure an even number of participants and ensuring that participants play in an equal number of matches.

On 13 May, Canada Soccer confirmed a total of ten member associations (nine provincial, one territorial) had indicated their participation for the 2024 tournament. Following two withdrawals from the competition in August 2024, the final number of provincial and territorial associations who participated in the competition was reduced to eight – with several revisions to the seeding and groups required.

=== Seeding and groups ===
Member associations were seeded according to the final classification of their representation teams in the previous year's championship, then assigned to two groups of five using a serpentine distribution method. Associations without representation in the previous year's tournament, host entries, and additional entries were then added to seeding in the order their participation in the competition was confirmed.

Within their groups, the teams played each other once in a single round-robin over the course of five days, with the teams receiving a bye day corresponding with their seed number (seeds 1–2 received a bye on day 5 of competition, seeds 3–4 on day 4, seeds 5–6 on day 3, and so on). The final round was held on day six of the competition, with match pairings determined by group standings.

==== Preliminary groups ====
Group A		Group B	
Seed	**Province or Territory**	**Seed**	**Province or Territory**
1	(Ontario Soccer Association) Ontario	**2**	(Soccer Québec) Québec
4	(British Columbia Soccer Association) British Columbia	**3**	(Soccer Nova Scotia) Nova Scotia
5	(Alberta Soccer Association) Alberta	**6**	(Manitoba Soccer Association) Manitoba
8	(Prince Edward Island Soccer Association) Prince Edward Island	**7**	(Newfoundland and Labrador Soccer Association) Newfoundland and Labrador
9	(Soccer New Brunswick) New Brunswick	◊	(Yukon Soccer Association) Yukon

==== Revised groups (as of 2 August) ====
Group A		Group B	
**Seed**	**Province or Territory**	**Seed**	**Province or Territory**
**1**	(Ontario Soccer Association) Ontario	**2**	(Soccer Québec) Québec
**4**	(British Columbia Soccer Association) British Columbia	**3**	(Soccer Nova Scotia) Nova Scotia
**5**	(Alberta Soccer Association) Alberta	**6**	(Manitoba Soccer Association) Manitoba
**8**	(Prince Edward Island Soccer Association) Prince Edward Island	**7**	(Newfoundland and Labrador Soccer Association) Newfoundland and Labrador
◊	(Yukon Soccer Association) Yukon	†	(British Columbia Soccer Association) British Columbia **(H)**

==== Final groups (as of 31 August) ====
Group A		Group B	
**Seed**	**Province or Territory**	**Seed**	**Province or Territory**
**1**	(Ontario Soccer Association) Ontario	**2**	(Soccer Québec) Québec
**4**	(British Columbia Soccer Association) British Columbia	**3**	(Soccer Nova Scotia) Nova Scotia
**5**	(Alberta Soccer Association) Alberta	**6**	(Manitoba Soccer Association) Manitoba
◊	(Yukon Soccer Association) Yukon	**7**	(Newfoundland and Labrador Soccer Association) Newfoundland and Labrador
†	(British Columbia Soccer Association) British Columbia **(H)**	‡	(Ontario Soccer Association) Ontario **(A)**

◊ denotes new entry† and (H) denote a host entry‡ and (A) denote an additional entry

=== Entrants ===
Of the 10 teams qualified to play at the 2024 Challenge Trophy, only 2 participated at the previous tournament in 2023 in Halifax. Nova Scotia's representatives, Suburban FC of Bedford, made their 3rd appearance overall in the tournament, on the heels of a 4th-place finish in 2023. Meanwhile, Edmonton Scottish returned as Alberta's representative for an impressive 8th time in the last 11 competitions, which also marked their 13th appearance overall.

Newfoundland's Holy Cross FC continued their historic run of Challenge Trophy entries, attending their 11th tournament in 14 years and 22nd overall. Elsewhere, British Columbia's representative team Coquitlam Metro-Ford SC returned for its first appearance in a quarter of a century (since 1999), and their host team Vancouver United Hibernian made their debut in Challenge Trophy competition.

Overall, the field boasted 5 previous champions, including 2022 winners Gloucester Celtic FC. Notably, 2023 champions West Ottawa Warriors did not enter Ontario's qualifying tournament, the Ontario Cup in 2024 – meaning they could not defend their title at this competition.

==== Qualified teams ====
Province/Territory	Team	Qualified as	Qualification date	Previous appearances in tournament (Note: Bold indicates champion for that year.)	Previous best performance(s)	Ref.
(British Columbia Soccer Association) British Columbia	Coquitlam Metro-Ford SC	BC Soccer Adult A Cup winners	28 April 2024	2 (1994, 1999)	Runners-up (1999)	
(British Columbia Soccer Association) British Columbia	Vancouver United Hibernian (Note: Awarded host entry into the tournament via articles 2.1.1 and 13.3 (competition format).)	Host entry, as BC Soccer Adult A Cup runners-up	2 August 2024 (Note: Qualified as runners-up on 28 April 2024, but awarded host team entry on 2 August 2024.)	0 (debut)	–	
(Alberta Soccer Association) Alberta	Edmonton Scottish	Alberta Soccer Challenge Cup winners	18 August 2024	12 (1972, 1979, 1987, 1992, 1996, 2012, 2013, 2015, **2016**, 2018, 2019, 2023)	**Champions** (2016)	
(Manitoba Soccer Association) Manitoba	Hellas SC	Manitoba MSA Cup Provincial Championship winners	27 July 2024	4 (2008, **2009**, 2012, 2022)	**Champions** (2009)	
(Ontario Soccer Association) Ontario	Gloucester Celtic FC	MilkUP Ontario Cup winners	31 August 2024 (Note: Qualified as Ontario Cup finalists on 25 August 2024 and confirmed as entrants on 31 August 2024.) (Note: Officially seeded on 8 September 2024 following Ontario Cup final result.)	3 (**2013**, 2016, **2022**)	**Champions** (2013, 2022)	
(Ontario Soccer Association) Ontario	Scarborough GS United (Note: Awarded additional entry into the tournament via articles 2.1.1 and 8 (replacement teams).)	Additional entry, as MilkUP Ontario Cup runners-up	31 August 2024	1 (**2005**)	**Champions** (2005)	
(Soccer Québec) Québec	CS Saint-Lazare/Hudson	LSEQ league final winners	21 September 2024 (Note: Rescheduled from original date of 15 September 2024.)	0 (debut)	–	
(Soccer New Brunswick) New Brunswick	~~Fredericton Picaroons Reds~~ (Note: Withdrew from the competition on 2 August 2024.)	NBPSL Challenge Cup winners	1 August 2024	10 (2007, 2011, 2012, 2014, 2015, 2016, 2017, 2018, 2019, 2023)	Sixth place (2007, 2019)	
(Soccer Nova Scotia) Nova Scotia	Suburban FC (Note: Competed in previous competitions as Suburban FC of Fall River.)	Soccer Nova Scotia AAA Cup winners	8 August 2024	2 (2011, 2023)	Fourth place (2023)	
(Prince Edward Island Soccer Association) Prince Edward Island	~~Winsloe-Charlottetown Royals~~ (Note: Withdrew from the competition on 31 August 2024.)	Acclaimed (Note: Awarded Prince Edward Island's provincial championship and competition berth by acclamation.)	13 May 2024	2 (2022, 2023)	Seventh place (2022)	
(Newfoundland and Labrador Soccer Association) Newfoundland and Labrador	Holy Cross FC	Newfoundland and Labrador Challenge Cup winners	18 August 2024	21 (1973, 1979, 1981, 1983, 1984, 1985, 1986, **1988**, 1989, 1992, 1994, 2009, 2010, 2011, 2012, 2014, 2015, 2017, 2018, 2019, 2022)	**Champions** (1988)	
(Yukon Soccer Association) Yukon	Yukon Selects SC	Acclaimed (Note: Awarded Yukon's territorial championship and competition berth by acclamation.)	13 May 2024	6 (2000, 2005, 2006, 2009, 2011, 2017)	Ninth place (2009)	

Denotes additional entry Denotes host entry Denotes withdrawn entries

==== Withdrawals ====
===== New Brunswick =====
In early August, following the release of the preliminary schedule and groups, New Brunswick informed Canada Soccer that they would be withdrawing their entry into the competition. As a result, Yukon were elevated a position within the seeding table and placed in group A, and British Columbia were awarded an additional berth into the tournament for a host team and automatically placed in the remaining group B slot.

This also marked the second time New Brunswick had withdrawn from the tournament in three years, following their abandonment of the 2022 competition.

===== Prince Edward Island =====
As the tournament drew closer, Prince Edward Island informed Canada Soccer on 31 August that they too would be withdrawing their team nomination. With a second berth already awarded to British Columbia via a host team, the Competitions Committee held a draw to determine which province would be awarded an entry for an additional team into the tournament – a process which last occurred ahead of the 2016 competition. This process resulted in Ontario being allotted an entry for an additional, unseeded team into the competition.

Following this withdrawal, the two finalists of the 2024 MilkUP Ontario Cup were informed of their qualification to the tournament. This meant that the Ontario representatives were determined on 31 August, as opposed to the date of their provincial final, which was scheduled for 8 September. These developments further triggered another change in seeding, with Yukon now elevated again by a position within the seeding table (remaining in group A). This also moved British Columbia's host team entry to group A, ultimately placing Ontario's additional team into group B.

== Venue and fields ==
All 25 group stage and classification matches took place across four artificial turf fields at Newton Athletic Park, within the host city of Surrey, British Columbia.

Surrey
Newton Athletic Park
Artificial turf field numbering and locations at Newton Athletic Park
1 Field 1
2 Field 2
4 Field 4
5 Field 5

== Competition ==
The preliminary schedule was released by Canada Soccer on 19 August without locations or kick-off times, which were later confirmed on 6 September.

=== Group stage ===
==== Tiebreakers ====
Tie-breaking criteria for group play

The following criteria is used by Canada Soccer to determine group standings:

1. Greater number of points across all group matches
2. If two (2) teams are tied in points across all group matches
  1. Greater number of points in matches between the two (2) tied teams (head-to-head competition)
  2. Greater goal difference across all group matches
  3. Greater number of goals for across all group matches
  4. Penalty kicks at a time and place determined by Canada Soccer
3. If three (3) or more teams are tied in points across all group matches
  1. Greater number of points in matches between the teams concerned (head-to-head competition)
  2. Greater number of goals for across the matches between the teams concerned
  3. Greater goal difference across all group matches
  4. Greater number of goals for across all group matches
  5. Drawing of lots at a time and place determined by Canada Soccer

Current as of November 2023, adapted from articles 14.7 and 14.9 of Canada Soccer's 2024 Competition Regulations for National Club Championships

==== Group A ====
Pos	Team	Pld	W	D	L	GF	GA	GD	Pts	Qualification	(Gloucester Celtic FC)	(Coquitlam Metro-Ford SC)	(Edmonton Scottish)	(Vancouver United Hibernian)	(Yukon Selects SC)
1	(Ontario Soccer Association) Gloucester Celtic FC	4	3	1	0	8	4	+4	10	Advance to Challenge Trophy final	—	3–1	1–1	3–2	1–0
2	(British Columbia Soccer Association) Coquitlam Metro-Ford SC	4	3	0	1	8	7	+1	9	Advance to bronze medal match	—	—	2–1	2–1	3–2
3	(Alberta Soccer Association) Edmonton Scottish	4	2	1	1	7	4	+3	7	Advance to fifth place match	—	—	—	2–0	3–1
4	(British Columbia Soccer Association) Vancouver United Hibernian (H)	4	1	0	3	5	7	−2	3	Advance to seventh place match	—	—	—	—	—
5	(Yukon Soccer Association) Yukon Selects SC	4	0	0	4	3	9	−6	0	Advance to ninth place match	—	—	—	0–2	—

Source: Canada Soccer
Rules for classification: Tiebreakers
(H) Host entry

Matchday 1

9 October 2024
10:00 UTC−7

Gloucester Celtic FC (Ontario Soccer Association)	1–0	(Yukon Soccer Association) Yukon Selects SC
	Report

Newton Athletic Park (Field 4), Surrey
Attendance: 20
Referee: David Schmidt-Schweda (British Columbia)
9 October 2024
10:00 UTC−7

Coquitlam Metro-Ford SC (British Columbia Soccer Association)	2–1	(Alberta Soccer Association) Edmonton Scottish
	Report

Newton Athletic Park (Field 1), Surrey
Attendance: 50
Referee: Thomas Noël (Québec)

Matchday 2

10 October 2024
12:30 UTC−7

Gloucester Celtic FC (Ontario Soccer Association)	3–1	(British Columbia Soccer Association) Coquitlam Metro-Ford SC
	Report

Newton Athletic Park (Field 4), Surrey
Attendance: 65
Referee: Amer Ramic (British Columbia)
10 October 2024
12:30 UTC−7

Edmonton Scottish (Alberta Soccer Association)	2–0	(British Columbia Soccer Association) Vancouver United Hibernian
	Report

Newton Athletic Park (Field 1), Surrey
Attendance: 80
Referee: Joey Ratcliffe (British Columbia)

Matchday 3

11 October 2024
10:00 UTC−7

Gloucester Celtic FC (Ontario Soccer Association)	3–2	(British Columbia Soccer Association) Vancouver United Hibernian
	Report

Newton Athletic Park (Field 4), Surrey
Attendance: 40
Referee: Mazzen Black (Alberta)
11 October 2024
10:00 UTC−7

Coquitlam Metro-Ford SC (British Columbia Soccer Association)	3–2	(Yukon Soccer Association) Yukon Selects SC
	Report

Newton Athletic Park (Field 1), Surrey
Attendance: 100
Referee: Marko Ristic (British Columbia)

Matchday 4

12 October 2024
12:30 UTC−7

Yukon Selects SC (Yukon Soccer Association)	0–2	(British Columbia Soccer Association) Vancouver United Hibernian
	Report

Newton Athletic Park (Field 4), Surrey
Attendance: 65
Referee: Mo Mohseni (British Columbia)
12 October 2024
15:00 UTC−7

Gloucester Celtic FC (Ontario Soccer Association)	1–1	(Alberta Soccer Association) Edmonton Scottish
	Report

Newton Athletic Park (Field 1), Surrey
Attendance: 120
Referee: Nico Jecanski (British Columbia)

Matchday 5

13 October 2024
12:30 UTC−7

Coquitlam Metro-Ford SC (British Columbia Soccer Association)	2–1	(British Columbia Soccer Association) Vancouver United Hibernian
	Report

Newton Athletic Park (Field 1), Surrey
Attendance: 160
Referee: Amer Ramic (British Columbia)
13 October 2024
12:30 UTC−7

Edmonton Scottish (Alberta Soccer Association)	3–1	(Yukon Soccer Association) Yukon Selects SC
	Report

Newton Athletic Park (Field 4), Surrey
Attendance: 47
Referee: Joey Ratcliffe (British Columbia)

==== Group B ====
Pos	Team	Pld	W	D	L	GF	GA	GD	Pts	Qualification	(Suburban FC of Bedford)	(Scarborough GS United)	(Hellas SC)	(Holy Cross FC)	(CS Saint-Lazare/Hudson)
1	(Soccer Nova Scotia) Suburban FC of Bedford	4	3	0	1	9	6	+3	9 (Note: Advance to Challenge Trophy final on criteria 2.1 with 4–3 win over Scarborough GS United (head to head competition))	Advance to Challenge Trophy final	—	4–3	0–2	3–1	—
2	(Ontario Soccer Association) Scarborough GS United (A)	4	3	0	1	8	6	+2	9	Advance to bronze medal match	—	—	—	—	—
3	(Manitoba Soccer Association) Hellas SC	4	2	1	1	8	6	+2	7	Advance to fifth place match	—	2–3	—	1–1	—
4	(Newfoundland and Labrador Soccer Association) Holy Cross FC	4	1	1	2	3	5	−2	4	Advance to seventh place match	—	0–1	—	—	—
5	(Soccer Québec) CS Saint-Lazare/Hudson	4	0	0	4	2	7	−5	0	Advance to ninth place match	0–2	0–1	2–3	0–1	—

Source: Canada Soccer
Rules for classification: Tiebreakers
(A) Additional entry
Notes:

Matchday 1

9 October 2024
12:30 UTC−7

CS Saint-Lazare/Hudson (Soccer Québec)	0–1	(Newfoundland and Labrador Soccer Association) Holy Cross FC
	Report

Newton Athletic Park (Field 1), Surrey
Attendance: 40
Referee: Mazzen Black (Alberta)
9 October 2024
12:30 UTC−7

Suburban FC of Bedford (Soccer Nova Scotia)	0–2	(Manitoba Soccer Association) Hellas SC
	Report

Newton Athletic Park (Field 4), Surrey
Attendance: 30
Referee: Amaury Majors (Bermuda)

Matchday 2

10 October 2024
10:00 UTC−7

CS Saint-Lazare/Hudson (Soccer Québec)	0–2	(Soccer Nova Scotia) Suburban FC of Bedford
	Report

Newton Athletic Park (Field 1), Surrey
Attendance: 60
Referee: Niko Jecanski (British Columbia)
10 October 2024
10:00 UTC−7

Hellas SC (Manitoba Soccer Association)	2–3	(Ontario Soccer Association) Scarborough GS United
	Report

Newton Athletic Park (Field 4), Surrey
Attendance: 50
Referee: Mo Mohseni (British Columbia)

Matchday 3

11 October 2024
12:30 UTC−7

CS Saint-Lazare/Hudson (Soccer Québec)	0–1	(Ontario Soccer Association) Scarborough GS United
	Report

Newton Athletic Park (Field 4), Surrey
Attendance: 150
Referee: Amaury Majors (Bermuda)
11 October 2024
12:30 UTC−7

Suburban FC of Bedford (Soccer Nova Scotia)	3–1	(Newfoundland and Labrador Soccer Association) Holy Cross FC
	Report

Newton Athletic Park (Field 1), Surrey
Attendance: 65
Referee: Thomas Noël (Québec)

Matchday 4

12 October 2024
10:00 UTC−7

CS Saint-Lazare/Hudson (Soccer Québec)	2–3	(Manitoba Soccer Association) Hellas SC
	Report

Newton Athletic Park (Field 4), Surrey
Attendance: 70
Referee: David Schmidt-Schweda (British Columbia)
12 October 2024
10:00 UTC−7

Holy Cross FC (Newfoundland and Labrador Soccer Association)	0–1	(Ontario Soccer Association) Scarborough GS United
	Report

Newton Athletic Park (Field 1), Surrey
Attendance: 75
Referee: Amer Ramic (British Columbia)

Matchday 5

13 October 2024
10:00 UTC−7

Suburban FC of Bedford (Soccer Nova Scotia)	4–3	(Ontario Soccer Association) Scarborough GS United
	Report

Newton Athletic Park (Field 1), Surrey
Attendance: 85
Referee: Thomas Noël (Québec)
13 October 2024
10:00 UTC−7

Hellas SC (Manitoba Soccer Association)	1–1	(Newfoundland and Labrador Soccer Association) Holy Cross FC
	Report

Newton Athletic Park (Field 4), Surrey
Attendance: 40
Referee: Amaury Majors (Bermuda)

=== Final round ===
==== Placement matches ====
Ninth place match

14 October 2024
08:00 UTC−7

Yukon Selects SC (Yukon Soccer Association)	0–6	(Soccer Québec) CS Saint-Lazare/Hudson
	Report

Newton Athletic Park (Field 5), Surrey
Attendance: 35
Referee: Joey Ratcliffe (British Columbia)

Seventh place match

14 October 2024
08:00 UTC−7

Vancouver United Hibernian (British Columbia Soccer Association)	5–1	(Newfoundland and Labrador Soccer Association) Holy Cross FC
	Report

Newton Athletic Park (Field 4), Surrey
Attendance: 25
Referee: Amaury Majors (Bermuda)

Fifth place match

14 October 2024
10:30 UTC−7

Edmonton Scottish (Alberta Soccer Association)	0–3	(Manitoba Soccer Association) Hellas SC
	Report

Newton Athletic Park (Field 5), Surrey
Attendance: 40
Referee: Mo Mohseni (British Columbia)

Bronze medal match

14 October 2024
10:30 UTC−7

Coquitlam Metro-Ford SC (British Columbia Soccer Association)	3–3	(Ontario Soccer Association) Scarborough GS United
	Report
Penalties
	5–4 (Note: Match went directly to penalty kicks following regulation time as per article 14.3 (duration of play, tie-breaking, and standings).)

Newton Athletic Park (Field 4), Surrey
Attendance: 100
Referee: Thomas Noël (Québec)

==== Challenge Trophy final ====
14 October 2024
10:30 UTC−7

Gloucester Celtic FC (Ontario Soccer Association)	1–0	(Soccer Nova Scotia) Suburban FC of Bedford
	Report

Newton Athletic Park (Field 1), Surrey
Attendance: 215
Referee: Niko Jecanski (British Columbia)

== Standings ==
=== Final classification ===
Per statistical convention in football, matches decided by penalty kicks are denoted as draws.

Pos	Grp	Team	Pld	W	D	L	GF	GA	GD	Pts	Final position
1	A	(Ontario Soccer Association) Gloucester Celtic FC (S)	5	4	1	0	9	4	+5	13	Champions
2	B	(Soccer Nova Scotia) Suburban FC of Bedford (S)	5	3	0	2	9	7	+2	9	Runners-up
3	A	(British Columbia Soccer Association) Coquitlam Metro-Ford SC (S)	5	3	1	1	11	10	+1	10	Third place
4	B	(Ontario Soccer Association) Scarborough GS United (A, U)	5	3	1	1	11	9	+2	10	
5	B	(Manitoba Soccer Association) Hellas SC (S)	5	3	1	1	11	6	+5	10	
6	A	(Alberta Soccer Association) Edmonton Scottish (S)	5	2	1	2	7	7	0	7	
7	A	(British Columbia Soccer Association) Vancouver United Hibernian (H, U)	5	2	0	3	10	8	+2	6	
8	B	(Newfoundland and Labrador Soccer Association) Holy Cross FC (S)	5	1	1	3	4	10	−6	4	
9	B	(Soccer Québec) CS Saint-Lazare/Hudson (S)	5	1	0	4	8	7	+1	3	
10	A	(Yukon Soccer Association) Yukon Selects SC (S)	5	0	0	5	3	15	−12	0	

Source: Canada Soccer
(A) Additional entry; (H) Host entry; (S) Seeded representative; (U) Unseeded representative (result precluded in 2025 seeding)

=== Seeding for 2025 Challenge Trophy ===
The table below indicates the seed position earned and allocated to each member association for 2025, provided that those associations send an entry to that competition. It is based on the performance of their seeded representation teams at this tournament (teams denoted with an (S) in the classification table), and may not reflect the preliminary seeding upon its release.

Seed	Province or Territory
1	(Ontario Soccer Association) Ontario
2	(Soccer Nova Scotia) Nova Scotia
3	(British Columbia Soccer Association) British Columbia
4	(Manitoba Soccer Association) Manitoba
5	(Alberta Soccer Association) Alberta
6	(Newfoundland and Labrador Soccer Association) Newfoundland and Labrador
7	(Soccer Québec) Québec
8	(Yukon Soccer Association) Yukon
