= Canadian soccer league system =

Structure of the soccer league system in Canada

- Country: Canada
- Sport: Soccer
- Promotion and relegation: Top division: No; Lower divisions: Limited

National system
- Federation: Canada Soccer
- Confederation: CONCACAF
- Top division: Canadian Premier League (men); Northern Super League (women)
- Cup competition: Canadian Championship (men); W Canadian Championship (women)

Regional systems
- Federations: Alberta Soccer; BC Soccer; Manitoba Soccer; Soccer New Brunswick; Newfoundland and Labrador Soccer; Soccer Nova Scotia; Ontario Soccer; PEI Soccer; Soccer Québec; Saskatchewan Soccer
- Top divisions: Alberta Premier League; British Columbia Premier League; Prairies Premier League; Ontario Premier League; Ligue1 Québec

The Canadian soccer league system, also called the Canadian soccer pyramid, is a multi-tiered soccer league system in Canada. The Canadian Soccer Association (CSA) oversees the system and domestic cups (including the Canadian Championship) but does not operate any of its component leagues. In addition, some Canadian teams compete in leagues that are based in the United States.

== Men ==
=== League structure ===
The Canadian Soccer Association system consists of several unconnected leagues and it does not have promotion and relegation in the top division. Leagues in the Canadian system are classified as either professional, pro-am, or amateur. The Canadian Soccer Association (CSA) is the governing body for the sport in Canada and directly sanctions leagues that operate in more than one province. Leagues operating in a single province receive sanctioning from their provincial soccer association.

==== Professional ====
The Canadian Premier League (CPL) is the top division of men's soccer in the Canadian soccer league system. It is the only fully professional, and only fully national, men's league in the system. Founded in 2019, the CPL is composed of eight teams and is sanctioned by the CSA. Each year, the top CPL clubs qualify for the CONCACAF Champions Cup.

There are also three Canadian teams which play in Major League Soccer, the division 1 league sanctioned by the United States Soccer Federation, reflecting a longstanding practice of major Canadian sports teams competing in American leagues. The Canadian clubs in this league are members of the CSA and compete in the Canadian Championship, rather than in the U.S. Open Cup, alongside clubs from the CPL and qualified lower division clubs.

The three Canadian MLS clubs also compete in the Leagues Cup, a competition held between MLS and Liga MX clubs, as the sub-regional competition within CONCACAF. The CPL does not take part in this competition.

==== Pro-am ====
Pro-am (or semi-pro) soccer competitions in Canada are regionally-based due to its large geography and dispersed pockets of population. Teams playing in pro-am leagues are permitted to be composed of professional and amateur players. There are five of such leagues in Canada: the Alberta Premier League (APL); the British Columbia Premier League (BCPL); the Prairies Premier League (PPL); the Ontario Premier League (OPL); and the Ligues senior provinciales (LS Pro). They are based in Alberta, British Columbia, the Prairies provinces of Manitoba and Saskatchewan as well as Northern Ontario, Southern Ontario, and Quebec respectively, and are sanctioned by their relevant provincial soccer associations. There are more than 40 sanctioned teams playing in these leagues. These five leagues belong to the parent organization Premier Soccer Leagues Canada which was founded in 2022 as League1 Canada.

LS Pro was founded as a semi-pro league in 2012 and is sanctioned by Soccer Quebec. The league includes a team from Eastern Ontario, who compete with special permission from the CSA.

Following the release of The Easton Report in 2013, the CSA set out to create a Division 3 semi-pro structure divided by region, similar to the major junior hockey leagues in Canada, with regional champions competing in a national tournament. In November 2013, the Ontario Soccer Association announced the sanction of League1 Ontario as part of this new structure.

On October 5, 2021, BC Soccer announced the establishment of League1 British Columbia as the nation's third regional pro-am soccer league. The league began play in May 2022 with seven clubs.

In 2022, Toronto FC II and Whitecaps FC 2 began play in MLS Next Pro, a USSF-sanctioned division 3 league. Both Canadian clubs are members of the CSA. Toronto FC II had played in the division 2 USL Championship until 2018 and in the division 3 USL League One from 2019 to 2021.

In March 2023, League1 Alberta was founded by the Alberta Soccer Association. With only five teams in the men's and women's division (one short of the requirement for sanctioning), the league played an exhibition series in 2023. By December 2023, league membership had grown to seven teams and so the league joined League1 Canada and received full sanctioning ahead of the 2024 season.

In January 2026, League1 Canada was renamed to Premier Soccer Leagues Canada as part of a larger rebrand that included the CPL and extended to most of PSL Canada's regional leagues. Also announced was a new league for the Prairies provinces of Manitoba and Saskatchewan called the Prairies Premier League, set for a May launch. Ligue1 Québec was excluded from the rebranding, instead becoming LS Pro.

==== Amateur ====
There are various amateur provincial leagues that are sanctioned under their individual provincial or territorial associations. This includes such leagues as the Pacific Coast Soccer League, Alberta Major Soccer League, Manitoba Major Soccer League, and the Ontario Soccer League. This collection of leagues across the country collectively compete for the Challenge Trophy.

There are 13 provincial and territorial soccer associations in Canada, with a number of leagues organized as amateur competitions at adult and/or youth levels. Typically there is promotion and relegation plus league and cup competitions in each provincial and territorial association, which culminates in the national Challenge Trophy. However, not all associations consistently send representative teams to national championships.

The United Soccer League (USL) manages several leagues, including the amateur USL League Two (USL2). USL2 is sanctioned and administered under the USASA and is below Division 3 in the United States soccer league system. On November 18, 2015, four Ontario teams (including FC London, who then moved to L1O) were given notice by the Ontario Soccer Association that they would no longer be permitted to participate in the league starting in 2017. As of 2025, there are no Canadian clubs in USL2.

=== Pyramid breakdown ===
As of the 2026 season.

Canadian leagues grouped by CSA sanctioning level
Tier	League				
Professional (Tier 1)	Canadian Premier League (CPL); 8 teams				
Pro-am (Tier 3)	Premier Soccer Leagues Canada				LS Pro
Pro-am (Tier 3)	Ontario Premier League 1 (OPL1); 12 teams ↓ relegate 1 or 2	British Columbia Premier League (BCPL); 8 teams	Alberta Premier League (APL); 8 teams	Prairies Premier League (PPL); 6 teams	Ligue1 Québec (L1QC); 12 teams ↓ relegate 2
Pro-am (Tier 3)	Ontario Premier League 2 (OPL2); 12 teams ↑ promote 1 or 2 ↓ relegate 1	British Columbia Premier League (BCPL); 8 teams	Alberta Premier League (APL); 8 teams	Prairies Premier League (PPL); 6 teams	Ligue2 Québec (L2QC); 12 teams in 2 groups ↑ promote 2 ↓ relegate 2
Pro-am (Tier 3)	Ontario Premier League 3 (OPL3); 28 teams in 3 conferences ↑ promote 1	British Columbia Premier League (BCPL); 8 teams	Alberta Premier League (APL); 8 teams	Prairies Premier League (PPL); 6 teams	Ligue3 Québec (L3QC); 25 teams in 2 groups ↑ promote 2
Amateur	Challenge Trophy; 13 provincial/territorial associations: AB; BC; MB; NB; NL; NS; NT; NU; ON; PE; QC; SK; YT				

American leagues grouped by USSF sanctioning level
Division	League
1	Major League Soccer (MLS); 30 teams, including 3 in Canada: CF Montréal; Toronto FC; Vancouver Whitecaps FC
2	No Canadian clubs at this level
3	MLS Next Pro; 29 teams, including 2 in Canada: Toronto FC II; Whitecaps FC 2

=== National cups ===
The Canadian Championship is the primary domestic cup in Canada. It was established in 2008 to determine the nation's representative at the CONCACAF Champions Cup. The tournament is organized by the Canadian Soccer Association and is open to fully professional Canadian teams (playing in American or Canadian leagues) and the winners of the Canadian regional pro-am leagues. The winner of the Canadian Championship is awarded the fan-created Voyageurs Cup which predates the tournament.

The Challenge Trophy is Canada's national men's amateur championship. It has been contested since 1913.

=== Professional leagues background ===
By the mid-1960s, there were four major leagues across Canada including the Eastern Canada Professional Soccer League (1961–1967). From west to east, the other major leagues were the Pacific Coast Soccer League (British Columbia), the Western Canada Soccer League (Alberta, Saskatchewan and eventually Manitoba and British Columbia), and the National Soccer League (Ontario and Quebec). In 1968, Canadian soccer turned its attention to the cross-nation North American Soccer League that initially featured professional teams in Vancouver and Toronto. Over the next 15 years, the professional league also featured teams in Calgary, Edmonton, and Montreal.

After the collapse of the original North American Soccer League, and Canada's participation in the 1986 FIFA World Cup the original Canadian Soccer League started operations as a nationally based CSA sanctioned Division 1 league. When the original CSL folded in 1993, three Canadian teams moved to the American Professional Soccer League (APSL) where several had played preseason games and competed in post season tournaments. Later in 1993, Major League Soccer (MLS) beat the APSL and won the USSF's competition for U.S. Division 1 status. Canadian teams continued to participate in the APSL and subsequently with the United Soccer Leagues merger in the A League / USL-1. FIFA did not allow the U.S. Division 1 sanctioned league to include foreign teams which was why the APSL was never officially recognized as Division 1 before MLS.

MLS would eventually expand into Canadian cities with existing U.S. Division 2 teams. Newly created Toronto FC joined MLS for the 2007 season, whereas the existing Toronto Lynx self relegated from the USL-1 and began playing in the amateur-only USL Premier Development League. The owners of Vancouver Whitecaps FC of the USSF Division 2 Professional League formed a team that joined MLS in 2011, and the owners Montreal Impact of the North American Soccer League created a team that joined in 2012.

One of the other original CSL teams did not join the APSL, they joined the National Soccer League based in southern Ontario. The National Soccer League renamed itself the Canadian National Soccer League (CNSL) with the addition of an out of province team. The CNSL had four teams found the second league named the Canadian Professional Soccer League (1998–2006) or CPSL with four other new teams. In 2006, the CPSL teams restarted in a new league, the second Canadian Soccer League (CSL). This second version of the CSL was initially sanctioned the Ontario Soccer Association and later by the Canadian Soccer Association as Division 3 in 2009. Following a match fixing scandal the league was then de-sanctioned in 2014 and continues to operate as a member of the Soccer Federation of Canada (SFC) that is not associated with any international body.

In February 2010, the Canadian Soccer League was granted full membership by the CSA and sanctioned as a semi-professional league. Sitting behind MLS and the NASL, the CSL operated as one of the Division 3 leagues within the Canadian pyramid. However, following the release of a development study and subsequent change in CSA policy for the future growth and development of regional leagues, also coinciding with match fixing allegations in 2012, the CSL was de-sanctioned by the CSA in 2013 and would not be considered a CSA sanctioned semi-pro league for the 2014 season.

In order to limit the Americanization of all of Canada's professional soccer clubs, the CSA issued a moratorium on the sanctioning of any new Division 2, 3, or 4 teams on November 15, 2010, which lasted until September 30, 2011. Despite the moratorium, the NASL announced that Ottawa had been awarded a franchise on June 20, 2011.

== Women ==
=== Professional ===
The Northern Super League (NSL) is the top-tier of women's soccer in Canada. It began play in 2025, becoming the first professional women's soccer league in Canada. In 2022, former national team player Diana Matheson and then-current national team captain Christine Sinclair first announced the league provisionally named Project 8. The NSL consisted of six teams during its inaugural season.

The CSA formerly had an affiliation with the U.S.-based National Women's Soccer League where some Canada women's national soccer team players would be assigned to an NWSL club. This affiliation ended in 2021 although many Canadians continue to play in the American league.

=== Pro-am ===
Various women's leagues operate throughout Canada and the United States at a lower level than NSL in a pro-am setup. As with the men's system, there is often no formal relationship (or results-based promotion/relegation) between leagues. There are five Canadian leagues: Ontario Premier League, LS Pro (Quebec), Prairies Premier League, Alberta Premier League and British Columbia Premier League, which have a total over 40 clubs. Like the men's divisions of these leagues, Premier Soccer Leagues Canada was formed as an umbrella organization for the three leagues. Since in 2022, PSL Canada has organized the Women's Inter-Provincial Championship, an annual competition between the provincial league champions. Until 2024, some Canadian clubs competed in United Women's Soccer.

=== U Sports and amateur ===
U Sports women's soccer is a league competition for students at Canadian universities. The two-month season is followed by the U Sports women's soccer championship to determine a national champion.

There are provincial competitions run by each of the provincial soccer associations to qualify an amateur team for the national championship, the Jubilee Trophy. Some of these are leagues and others cup competitions. Many other primarily adult amateur leagues, some with eight month seasons, also culminate in the Jubilee Trophy. There are indoor (March) and outdoor (September) national championships given Canada's climate.

=== Pyramid breakdown ===
As of the 2026 season.

Tier	League				
Professional (Tier 1)	Northern Super League; 6 teams				
Pro-am (Tier 3)	Premier Soccer Leagues Canada				
Pro-am (Tier 3)	Ontario Premier League 1 (OPL1); 10 teams ↓ relegate 1 or 2	Ligue1 Québec (L1QC); 11 teams	British Columbia Premier League (BCPL); 9 teams	Alberta Premier League (APL); 9 teams	Prairies Premier League (PPL); 6 teams
Pro-am (Tier 3)	Ontario Premier League 2 (OPL2); 10 teams ↑ promote 1 or 2 ↓ relegate 1	Ligue2 Québec (L2QC); 19 teams ↑ promote 1	British Columbia Premier League (BCPL); 9 teams	Alberta Premier League (APL); 9 teams	Prairies Premier League (PPL); 6 teams
Pro-am (Tier 3)	Ontario Premier League 3 (OPL3); 25 teams in 3 conferences ↑ promote 1	Ligue2 Québec (L2QC); 19 teams ↑ promote 1	British Columbia Premier League (BCPL); 9 teams	Alberta Premier League (APL); 9 teams	Prairies Premier League (PPL); 6 teams
Amateur	Jubilee Trophy; 13 provincial/territorial associations: AB; BC; MB; NB; NL; NS; NT; NU; ON; PE; QC; SK; YT				

== See also ==
- Soccer in Canada
- List of Canadian soccer clubs in American leagues
- United States soccer league system
