= Soccer at the Canada Games =

Soccer competition in Canada

Canada Games Soccer Tournament
- Founded: 1967
- Region: Canada
- Teams: 24 (12 men, 12 women)
- Current champions: Men: Quebec (5th); Women: Ontario (3rd)
- Most championships: Men: British Columbia and Quebec (5 each); Women: British Columbia (5)
- Website: canadagames.ca/soccer
- Soccer at the 2025 Canada Summer Games

For soccer in Canada, the quadrennial Canada Summer Games competition has a soccer tournament. The participants are provincial and territorial soccer associations.

== Participants ==
- British Columbia Soccer Association
- Alberta Soccer Association
- Saskatchewan Soccer Association
- Manitoba Soccer Association
- Ontario Soccer Association
- Quebec Soccer Federation
- Newfoundland and Labrador Soccer Association
- Soccer Nova Scotia
- Soccer New Brunswick
- Prince Edward Island Soccer Association
- Northwest Territories Soccer Association
- Yukon Soccer Association

== Statistics ==
=== Participating provinces ===
==== Men ====
Province	1969	1973	1977	1981	1985	1989	1993	1997	2001	2005	2009	2013	2017	2022	2025
Alberta	7	8	5	2	1	5	5	3	1	5	2	5	2	3	2
British Columbia	1	1	1	1	4	6	1	2	7	4	8	2	8	5	3
Manitoba	5	3	7	7	6	3	4	10	9	9	9	10	4	8	10
New Brunswick	6	6	8	10	7	8	9	8	10	2	6	8	5	4	6
Newfoundland and Labrador	3	5	4	6	5	4	8	6	2	10	7	4	6	11	8
Northwest Territories	10	–	–	–	–	–	11	11	12	12	12	12	12	12	12
Nova Scotia	4	7	6	4	9	7	3	4	3	6	4	7	7	9	4
Nunavut									–	–	–	–	–	–	–
Ontario	2	2	3	5	3	1	2	7	5	1	3	3	1	2	5
Prince Edward Island	11	10	10	9	8	10	6	5	4	8	5	6	11	10	7
Quebec	9	4	2	3	2	2	7	1	7	3	1	1	3	1	1
Saskatchewan	8	9	9	8	10	9	10	9	6	7	10	9	9	6	9
Yukon	12	11	11	–	–	–	–	–	11	11	11	11	10	7	11

=== Medal winners ===
==== Men ====
Games	Gold	Silver	Bronze
1969 Halifax/Dartmouth	British Columbia	Ontario	Newfoundland
1973 New Westminster/Burnaby	British Columbia	Ontario	Manitoba
1977 St. John's	British Columbia	Quebec	Ontario
1981 Thunder Bay	British Columbia	Alberta	Quebec
1985 Saint John	Alberta	Quebec	Ontario
1989 Saskatoon	Ontario	Quebec	Manitoba
1993 Kamloops	British Columbia	Ontario	Nova Scotia
1997 Brandon	Quebec	British Columbia	Alberta
2001 London	Alberta	Newfoundland	Nova Scotia
2005 Regina	Ontario	New Brunswick	Quebec
2009 Charlottetown	Quebec	Alberta	Ontario
2013 Sherbrooke	Quebec	British Columbia	Ontario
2017 Winnipeg	Ontario	Alberta	Quebec
2022 Niagara	Quebec	Ontario	Alberta
2025 St. John's	Quebec	Alberta	British Columbia

==== Women ====
Games	Gold	Silver	Bronze
1993 Kamloops	British Columbia	Nova Scotia	Quebec
1997 Brandon	British Columbia	Quebec	Ontario
2001 London	Ontario	British Columbia	Saskatchewan
2005 Regina	British Columbia	Alberta	Ontario
2009 Charlottetown	British Columbia	Quebec	Ontario
2013 Sherbrooke	British Columbia	Quebec	Ontario
2017 Winnipeg	Quebec	Ontario	Nova Scotia
2022 Niagara	Ontario	Quebec	Nova Scotia
2025 St. John's	Ontario	Quebec	Nova Scotia

=== Medal table ===
==== Men ====
Rank	Nation	Gold	Silver	Bronze	Total
1	Quebec	5	3	3	11
2	British Columbia	5	2	1	8
3	Ontario	3	4	4	11
4	Alberta	2	4	2	8
5	Newfoundland and Labrador	0	1	1	2
6	New Brunswick	0	1	0	1
7	Manitoba	0	0	2	2
7	Nova Scotia	0	0	2	2
Totals (8 entries)		15	15	15	45

==== Women ====
Rank	Nation	Gold	Silver	Bronze	Total
1	British Columbia	5	1	0	6
2	Ontario	3	1	4	8
3	Quebec	1	5	1	7
4	Nova Scotia	0	1	3	4
5	Alberta	0	1	0	1
6	Saskatchewan	0	0	1	1
Totals (6 entries)		9	9	9	27

== Notable players ==
Twenty-one players from the Canada Games soccer tournament have since been inducted in the Canada Soccer Hall of Fame as honoured players from their professional and international careers (through the Class of 2022).

- Garry Ayre (British Columbia 1973 gold)
- Patrice Bernier (Quebec 1997 gold)
- Bob Bolitho (British Columbia 1973 gold)
- Jack Brand (Ontario 1973 silver)
- Ian Bridge (British Columbia 1977 gold)
- Carla Chin (Ontario 1993)
- Tony Chursky (British Columbia 1973 gold)
- Janine Helland (Alberta 1993)
- Randee Hermus (British Columbia 1997 gold)
- Lyndon Hooper (Ontario 1985 bronze)
- Kara Lang (Ontario 2001 gold)
- Karina LeBlanc (British Columbia 1997 gold)
- Sam Lenarduzzi (British Columbia 1969 gold)
- John McGrane (Ontario 1973 silver)
- Kevin McKenna (Alberta 1997 bronze)
- Luce Mongrain (Quebec 1993 bronze)
- Suzanne Muir (Nova Scotia 1993 silver)
- Andrea Neil (British Columbia 1993 gold)
- Helen Stoumbos (Ontario 1993)
- Mark Watson (British Columbia 1989)
- Rhian Wilkinson (Quebec 2001)

Other notable athletes that played soccer at the Canada Games include:

- Chris Bennett (British Columbia 1973 gold)
- Melanie Booth (Ontario 2001 gold)
- Allysha Chapman (Ontario 2005 bronze)
- Drew Ferguson (British Columbia 1977 gold)
- Robyn Gayle (Ontario 2001 gold)
- Vanessa Gilles (Ontario 2013 bronze)
- Julia Grosso (British Columbia 2017)
- Doneil Henry (Ontario 2009 bronze)
- Kaylyn Kyle (Saskatchewan 2005)
- Adriana Leon (Ontario 2009 bronze)
- Sydney Leroux (British Columbia 2005 gold)
- Diana Matheson (Ontario 2001 gold)
- Erin McLeod (Alberta 2001)
- Kamal Miller (Ontario 2013 bronze)
- Carmelina Moscato (Ontario 2001 gold)
- Marie-Eve Nault (Quebec 2001)
- Kelly Parker (Saskatchewan 2001 bronze)
- Lui Passaglia (British Columbia 1973 gold)
- Desiree Scott (Manitoba 2005)
- Dayne St. Clair (Ontario 2013 bronze)
- Katie Weatherston (Ontario 2001 gold)
- Shelina Zadorsky (Ontario 2009 bronze)
