= 2023 Challenge Trophy =

99th edition of amateur cup competition in Canadian soccer

2023 Canada Soccer National Championships
- 2023 Toyota National Championships; French: Championnats nationaux Toyota 2023

Tournament details
- Country: Canada
- Dates: 4–9 October 2023
- Teams: 10

Final positions
- Champions: (Ontario Soccer Association) West Ottawa Warriors (1st title)
- Runners-up: (Soccer Nova Scotia) Western Halifax FC

Tournament statistics
- Matches played: 25
- Goals scored: 90 (3.6 per match)
- Top goal scorer(s): (Surrey BB5 United) Farivar Torabi (FC Winnipeg Lions) Montassar Trimech (4 goals)

Awards
- Best player: (West Ottawa Warriors) Javane Henry

The 2023 Canada Soccer National Championships (officially the Toyota National Championships for sponsorship reasons) was the 99th staging of Canada Soccer's amateur football club competition. West Ottawa SC won the Challenge Trophy after they beat Western Halifax FC in the Canadian Final at Mainland Commons in Halifax on 9 October 2023.

West Ottawa SC won 1–0 in the Canadian Final with the lone goal scored by Zach El Shafei.

Ten teams qualified to the final week of the 2023 National Championships in Halifax. Each team played four group matches before the medal and ranking matches on the last day.

On the road to the National Championships, West Ottawa SC beat Scarborough GS United in the 2023 Ontario Cup Final.

== Teams ==
Teams were seeded on the basis of their Provincial/Territorial Associations team's final standing in the previous year's championship.

Group A	Group B
(Ontario Soccer Association) Ontario	(Alberta Soccer Association) Alberta
(British Columbia Soccer Association) British Columbia	(Newfoundland and Labrador Soccer Association) Newfoundland and Labrador
(Manitoba Soccer Association) Manitoba	(Soccer Nova Scotia) Nova Scotia A
(Soccer Quebec) Quebec	(PEI Soccer Association) Prince Edward Island
(Soccer New Brunswick) New Brunswick	(Soccer Nova Scotia) Nova Scotia B

=== Teams ===
Each of Canada Soccer's thirteen provincial and territorial associations can send one representative to the Challenge Trophy, with teams generally qualifying through a regional preliminary series such as an open cup or league competition.

For the 2023 tournament, nine provincial associations confirmed their participation, with Nova Scotia fielding two teams as the host.

Province	Team	Qualified as	Previous appearances in tournament^{1}	Previous best performance	Ref.
(British Columbia Soccer Association) British Columbia	Surrey BB5 United^{2}	BC Soccer Adult A Cup winners	2 (**2019**, 2022)	**Champions** (2019)	
(Alberta Soccer Association) Alberta	Edmonton Scottish	Alberta Soccer Challenge Cup winners	11 (1972, 1979, 1987, 1992, 1996, 2012, 2013, 2015, **2016**, 2018, 2019)	**Champions** (2016)	
(Manitoba Soccer Association) Manitoba	FC Winnipeg Lions^{3}	Manitoba Soccer Provincial Championship winners	11 (1996, 1998, **2002**, 2007, 2012, 2013, 2014, 2016, 2017, 2018, 2019)	**Champions** (2002)	
(Ontario Soccer Association) Ontario	West Ottawa Warriors	MilkUP Ontario Cup winners	0 (debut)	—	
(Soccer Quebec) Quebec	Rapides de Chaudière-Ouest	LSEQ league winners	1 (2022)	Eighth place (2022)	
(Soccer New Brunswick) New Brunswick	Fredericton Picaroons Reds	NBPSL Challenge Cup Final winners	9 (2007, 2011, 2012, 2014, 2015, 2016, 2017, 2018, 2019)	Sixth place (2007, 2019)	
(Soccer Nova Scotia) Nova Scotia	Suburban FC of Fall River	Soccer Nova Scotia AAA Cup winners	1 (2011)	Fifth place (2011)	
(Soccer Nova Scotia) Nova Scotia	Western Halifax FC	Soccer Nova Scotia AAA Cup runners-up	2 (2016, **2017**)	**Champions** (2017)	
(Newfoundland and Labrador Soccer Association) Newfoundland and Labrador	Feildians AA of St. John's	Newfoundland and Labrador Challenge Cup winners	2 (1969, 2008)	Third place (1969)	
(PEI Soccer Association) Prince Edward Island	Winsloe-Charlottetown Royals	PEI winners by acclamation as the only PEI team in the NB Premier League	1 (2022)	Seventh place (2022)	—

^{1} Bold indicates champion for that year.
^{2} Competed in previous tournaments as Central City Breakers FC.
^{3} Competed in previous tournaments as Winnipeg Sons of Italy.

== Venues ==
Matches took place at three different venues within the Halifax Regional Municipality.

Bedford	Dartmouth	Halifax
Bedford-Hammond Plains	Harbour East Field	Mainland Common Field
Capacity: 400	Capacity: 400	Capacity: 400

== Group stage ==
Competing teams were divided into two groups of five teams, playing against one another in a single round-robin and advancing to the final round based on their group positioning.

The preliminary schedule was released by Canada Soccer in August 2023 without locations or kick-off times, which were later confirmed on 15 September. Teams were given bye days based on the pot they were drawn from, with pot 1 teams receiving byes on the 5th day of the group stage, pot 2 teams receiving byes on the 4th day of the group stage, etc.

Tie-breaking criteria for group play
The following criteria shall be used to determine the final standings:
1. Most points in all group matches;
2. If two (2) teams are tied in points in all group matches:
  1. Greater number of points in matches between the teams concerned (head to head competition);
  2. Greater goal difference in all group matches;
  3. Greater number of goals scored in all group matches;
  4. Kicks from the penalty mark as per the Laws of the Game, at a time and place decided by the Canada Soccer General Coordinator.
3. If three (3) or more teams are tied in points in all group matches, the following are the only criteria to break the tie:
  1. Greater goal difference in matches between the teams concerned (head to head competition);
  2. Greater number of goals scored in all matches between the teams concerned;
  3. Greater goal difference in all group matches;
  4. Greater number of goals scored in all group matches;
  5. Drawing of lots to determine ranking at a time and place decided by the Match Commissioner.

=== Group A ===
Pos	Team	Pld	W	D	L	GF	GA	GD	Pts	Qualification	(West Ottawa Warriors)	(Rapides de Chaudière-Ouest)	(Surrey BB5 United)	(FC Winnipeg Lions)	(Fredericton Picaroons Reds)
1	(Ontario Soccer Association) West Ottawa Warriors	4	3	0	1	12	4	+8	9 (Note: Advance to first place match on criteria 2.1 with 2–1 win over Rapides de Chaudière-Ouest (head to head competition))	Advance to first place match	—	2–1	1–0	1–3	8–0
2	(Soccer Quebec) Rapides de Chaudière-Ouest	4	3	0	1	10	4	+6	9	Advance to third place match	—	—	—	—	6–1
3	(British Columbia Soccer Association) Surrey BB5 United	4	2	0	2	9	5	+4	6 (Note: Advance to fifth place match on criteria 2.1 with 2–1 win over FC Winnipeg Lions (head to head competition))	Advance to fifth place match	—	1–2	—	2–1	6–1
4	(Manitoba Soccer Association) FC Winnipeg Lions	4	2	0	2	10	4	+6	6	Advance to seventh place match	—	0–1	—	—	6–0
5	(Soccer New Brunswick) Fredericton Picaroons Reds	4	0	0	4	2	26	−24	0	Advance to ninth place match	—	—	—	—	—

Source: Canada Soccer
Rules for classification: Tiebreakers
Notes:

4 October 2023
11:00 UTC−4

Surrey BB5 United (British Columbia Soccer Association)	2–1	(Manitoba Soccer Association) FC Winnipeg Lions
de Jong 32'; MacMillan 42'; Morello (yellow card) 74'; O'Shea (yellow card) 90'	Report	Figueiredo (yellow card) 22' (yellow-red card) 45+2'; Hodges (yellow card) 24'; Hidalgo-Mazzei 37' (pen.)

Mainland Common Field, Halifax
Referee: Mazen Hassanin
4 October 2023
13:30 UTC−4

West Ottawa Warriors (Ontario Soccer Association)	2–1	(Soccer Quebec) Rapides de Chaudière-Ouest
Rodriguez (yellow card) 31'; Comba 35'; Henry 51', (yellow card) 80'	Report	Mathieu (yellow card) 10'; Aussems (yellow card) 63'; Assouyat 72', (yellow card) 90+2'; N'Guessan (yellow card) 88'; Turgeon (yellow card) 90+1'

Mainland Common Field, Halifax
Attendance: Mario Al-Ayass

5 October 2023
11:00 UTC−4

West Ottawa Warriors (Ontario Soccer Association)	1–0	(British Columbia Soccer Association) Surrey BB5 United
Henry (yellow card) 6'; Curkovic 18'; El-Shafei (yellow card) 86'; Bastianelli (yellow card) 90'	Report	Hodut (yellow card) 22'; Essa (yellow card) 42' (yellow-red card) 90+2'; Rostant (yellow card) 63'; de Graaf (yellow card) 64'; MacMillan (yellow card) 69'; Smychenko (yellow card) 71' (yellow-red card) 90+5'

Mainland Common Field, Halifax
Referee: Mo Mohseni
5 October 2023
16:00 UTC−4

FC Winnipeg Lions (Manitoba Soccer Association)	6–0	(Soccer New Brunswick) Fredericton Picaroons Reds
Nadeau 1'; Law 8' (o.g.); Hidalgo-Mazzei 52'; dos Anjos Aquino 56'; Kabamba 70'; Hodges 90+1'	Report	Morrison (yellow card) 36'

Mainland Common Field, Halifax
Referee: Mazzen Black

6 October 2023
11:00 UTC−4

West Ottawa Warriors (Ontario Soccer Association)	8–0	(Soccer New Brunswick) Fredericton Picaroons Reds
Belhaj 3', 5', 27'; Bastianelli 20', 46'; McKee 26'; Markus 73', 84'	Report

Mainland Common Field, Halifax
Referee: Aubrey Kotelko
6 October 2023
13:30 UTC−4

Surrey BB5 United (British Columbia Soccer Association)	1–2	(Soccer Quebec) Rapides de Chaudière-Ouest
MacMillan 23'; de Jong (yellow card) 81'	Report	Roy-Madore 25'; Mathieu (yellow card) 32'; Levasseur (yellow card) 37'; N'Guessan (yellow card) 56'; Chaouki 86'

Mainland Common Field, Halifax
Referee: Robert D'Alesio

7 October 2023
11:00 UTC−4

West Ottawa Warriors (Ontario Soccer Association)	1–3	(Manitoba Soccer Association) FC Winnipeg Lions
Pensom (red card) 8'; Natoli 61'; Johnson (yellow card) 70'; Mohasar (yellow card) 90'	Report	Budhoo (yellow card) 17', (goal) 51'; Wood (yellow card) 32'; Trimech 56', 74'; Moraldo (yellow card) 79'

Mainland Common Field, Halifax
Referee: Marie-Soleil Beaudoin
7 October 2023
13:30 UTC−4

Rapides de Chaudière-Ouest (Soccer Quebec)	6–1	(Soccer New Brunswick) Fredericton Picaroons Reds
Morin 11', 61' (pen.); Jeanneau (yellow card) 32'; Lamontagne 44'; Chaouki 46'; Aussems 82'; Levasseur 84'	Report	Itoafa 32' (pen.); Law (yellow card) 41'; Morrison (yellow card) 52' (yellow-red card) 90+4'; Padilha (yellow card) 71'

Mainland Common Field, Halifax
Referee: Simon Gomez

8 October 2023
09:00 UTC−4

Surrey BB5 United (British Columbia Soccer Association)	6–1	(Soccer New Brunswick) Fredericton Picaroons Reds
Gindo 29'; Torabi 33', 71', 89'; Morello 41'; Bruk 49'	Report	Pinsent (yellow card) 32'; Choudhary 85'

Mainland Common Field, Halifax
Referee: Scott Decker
8 October 2023
14:00 UTC−4

FC Winnipeg Lions (Manitoba Soccer Association)	0–1	(Soccer Quebec) Rapides de Chaudière-Ouest
Naumiuk (yellow card) 35'; Appler (yellow card) 45+2' (yellow-red card) 72'; Hidalgo-Mazzei (yellow card) 90'	Report	N'Guessan (yellow card) 28'; Kabamba 37' (o.g.); Roy-Madore (yellow card) 46'; Turgeon (yellow card) 59'; Attia (yellow card) 69' (yellow-red card) 89'; Misol Rodriguez (yellow card) 86'

Mainland Common Field, Halifax
Referee: Mo Mohseni

=== Group B ===
Pos	Team	Pld	W	D	L	GF	GA	GD	Pts	Qualification	(Western Halifax FC)	(Suburban FC of Fall River)	(Edmonton Scottish)	(Feildians AA of St. John's)	(Winsloe-Charlottetown Royals)
1	(Soccer Nova Scotia) Western Halifax FC (H)	4	3	1	0	6	1	+5	10	Advance to first place match	—	—	—	—	—
2	(Soccer Nova Scotia) Suburban FC of Fall River (H)	4	2	1	1	3	2	+1	7 (Note: Advance to third place match on criteria 2.1 with 0–1 win over Edmonton Scottish (head to head competition))	Advance to third place match	0–1	—	—	—	2–1
3	(Alberta Soccer Association) Edmonton Scottish	4	2	1	1	5	3	+2	7	Advance to fifth place match	0–0	0–1	—	2–1	3–1
4	(Newfoundland and Labrador Soccer Association) Feildians AA of St. John's	4	1	1	2	4	6	−2	4	Advance to seventh place match	1–3	0–0	—	—	2–1
5	(PEI Soccer Association) Winsloe-Charlottetown Royals	4	0	0	4	3	9	−6	0	Advance to ninth place match	0–2	—	—	—	—

Source: Canada Soccer
Rules for classification: Tiebreakers
(H) Hosts
Notes:

4 October 2023
16:00 UTC−4

Edmonton Scottish (Alberta Soccer Association)	3–1	(PEI Soccer Association) Winsloe-Charlottetown Royals
Gajic 27'; MacLachlan 42'; MacDonald 56'; Borrett (yellow card) 66'	Report	Maund 23'

Mainland Common Field, Halifax
Referee: David Schmidt-Schweda
4 October 2023
18:30 UTC−4

Feildians AA of St. John's (Newfoundland and Labrador Soccer Association)	0–0	(Soccer Nova Scotia) Suburban FC of Fall River
Exley (yellow card) 26'; Power (yellow card) 88'	Report

Mainland Common Field, Halifax
Referee: Robert D'Alesio

5 October 2023
13:30 UTC−4

Edmonton Scottish (Alberta Soccer Association)	2–1	(Newfoundland and Labrador) Feildians AA of St. John's
MacDonald 20'; Graham 31'; Gazic (yellow card) 82'; McCormick (yellow card) 82'; S. Lam (yellow card) 90+3'	Report	Neil (yellow card) 39'; Dolo 51'; Opuoro (yellow card) 78'; Courage (red card) 82'; Jones (yellow card) 85'

Mainland Common Field, Halifax
Referee: Darcy Bristol
5 October 2023
16:00 UTC−4

Suburban FC of Fall River (Soccer Nova Scotia)	0–1	(Soccer Nova Scotia) Western Halifax FC
Green (yellow card) 90+3'	Report	Ndopedro 3', (yellow card) 76'; Bekkers (yellow card) 37'; Bruce (yellow card) 62'; Kodejs (yellow card) 77'

Mainland Common Field, Halifax
Referee: Mazen Hassanin

6 October 2023
16:00 UTC−4

Edmonton Scottish (Alberta Soccer Association)	0–0	(Soccer Nova Scotia) Western Halifax FC
Demers (yellow card) 90+2'	Report	Ndopedro (yellow card) 16'; Iatrou (yellow card) 44'; Rodriguez (yellow card) 51'

Mainland Common Field, Halifax
Referee: Rayan Bouhlel
6 October 2023
18:30 UTC−4

Feildians AA of St. John's (Newfoundland and Labrador Soccer Association)	2–1	(PEI Soccer Association) Winsloe-Charlottetown Royals
Exley 9'; Davis (yellow card) 13'; Gamba (yellow card) 54'; Dolo 74'; Harvey (yellow card) 90+2' (red card) 90+3'	Report	Hunter (yellow card) 29', (goal) 90+7'; Lasia (yellow card) 30'; VanWiechen (yellow card) 44' (yellow-red card) 60'

Mainland Common Field, Halifax
Referee: Isabelle Duclos

7 October 2023
16:00 UTC−4

Winsloe-Charlottetown Royals (PEI Soccer Association)	0–2	(Soccer Nova Scotia) Western Halifax FC
	Report	Iatrou 13'; Pike (yellow card) 44'; MacEachern 64' (o.g.); Bekkers (yellow card) 74'

Mainland Common Field, Halifax
Referee: Mario Al-Ayass
7 October 2023
18:30 UTC−4

Edmonton Scottish (Alberta Soccer Association)	0–1	(Soccer Nova Scotia) Suburban FC of Fall River
Prochnau (yellow card) 90+1'	Report	Jaber (yellow card) 11', (goal) 25'; Mellema (yellow card) 67'; Veinot (yellow card) 90+4'

Mainland Common Field, Halifax
Referee: Mo Mohseni

8 October 2023
11:30 UTC−4

Feildians AA of St. John's (Newfoundland and Labrador Soccer Association)	1–3	(Soccer Nova Scotia) Western Halifax FC
Dolo 27'; Nunes (yellow card) 50'; Nakonieczny (yellow card) 86'; Gamba (yellow card) 87'; Osmond (yellow card) 90+2'	Report	Thompson 43'; Hawley (yellow card) 45+1'; Kodejs 47'; Geyer (yellow card) 55', (goal) 80'; Ndopedro (yellow card) 57'

Mainland Common Field, Halifax
Referee: David Schmidt-Schweda
8 October 2023
16:30 UTC−4

Suburban FC of Fall River (Soccer Nova Scotia)	2–1	(PEI Soccer Association) Winsloe-Charlottetown Royals
Warren 9'; Sanchez 36'; Mercer (yellow card) 40'	Report	Tweel 13'; Sanchez (yellow card) 26'; Smiley (yellow card) 81'; VanWiechen (yellow card) 90+6'

Mainland Common Field, Halifax
Referee: Mazzen Black

== Final round ==
The final round (known as Teck Finals Day for sponsorship reasons) paired equally-ranked opponents from opposite groups to determine a final ranking for the tournament.

9 October 2023
11:30 UTC−4
Ninth place match

Fredericton Picaroons Reds (Soccer New Brunswick)	2–6	(PEI Soccer Association) Winsloe-Charlottetown Royals
Morrison 38'; Cotton (yellow card) 58' (red card) 85'; Law 70'		Reddick-Stevens 9', 35'; Tweel 25', 77'; Smiley 54'; Stewart 64'

BMO Soccer Centre, Halifax ^{(Note)}
Referee: Mazen Hassanin
^{(Note)} Match was originally scheduled to be played at Bedford-Hammond Plains in Bedford, but was moved indoors to the BMO Soccer Centre in Halifax due to field damage caused by Tropical Storm Philippe.

9 October 2023
11:30 UTC−4
Seventh place match

FC Winnipeg Lions (Manitoba Soccer Association)	7–2	(Newfoundland and Labrador) Feildians AA of St. John's
dos Anjos Aquino 5'; Peddle 20'; Hodges 37'; Budhoo 45'; Figueiredo 53', (yellow card) 57'; Trimech 65', 79'		Nakonieczny (yellow card) 26'; Nunes 29'; Gamba (yellow card) 67'; Jones 90+2'

Harbour East Field, Dartmouth
Referee: Mazzen Black

9 October 2023
11:30 UTC−4
Fifth place match

Surrey BB5 United (British Columbia Soccer Association)	3–2	(Alberta Soccer Association) Edmonton Scottish
Torabi 51'; Essa 54', (yellow card) 81'; Morello 76'		Gazic 48', 59'; MacLachlan (yellow card) 74'

Harbour East Field, Dartmouth
Referee: David Schmidt-Schweda

9 October 2023
11:30 UTC−4
Third place match

Rapides de Chaudière-Ouest (Soccer Quebec)	2–1	(Soccer Nova Scotia) Suburban FC of Fall River
Roy-Madore 23'; Chaouki 56'; Misol Rodriguez (yellow card) 70'; Lamontagne (yellow card) 85'	Report	Larsen (yellow card) 24'; Greedy 53'; Warren (yellow card) 55'; Veinot (yellow card) 56'; Taylor (yellow card) 72'; Bain (yellow card) 90+6'

Mainland Common Field, Halifax
Referee: Robert D'Alesio

9 October 2023
12:30 UTC−4
Final

West Ottawa Warriors (Ontario Soccer Association)	1–0	(Soccer Nova Scotia) Western Halifax FC
Henry (yellow card) 19'; El-Shafei 41', (yellow card) 42'; Rodriguez (yellow card) 72'; Mohasar (yellow card) 84'	Report	Geyer (yellow card) 46'; Ellis (yellow card) 63'; Gorski (yellow card) 90+1'

Mainland Common Field, Halifax
Referee: Mario Al-Ayass

== Statistics ==
=== Classification ===
Per statistical convention in football, matches decided by penalty shoot-outs are counted as draws.

Pos	Grp	Team	Pld	W	D	L	GF	GA	GD	Pts	Final position
1	A	(Ontario Soccer Association) West Ottawa Warriors	5	4	0	1	13	4	+9	12	Champions
2	B	(Soccer Nova Scotia) Western Halifax FC (H)	5	3	1	1	6	2	+4	10	Runners-up
3	A	(Soccer Quebec) Rapides de Chaudière-Ouest	5	4	0	1	12	5	+7	12	Third place
4	B	(Soccer Nova Scotia) Suburban FC of Fall River (H)	5	2	1	2	4	4	0	7	
5	A	(British Columbia Soccer Association) Surrey BB5 United	5	3	0	2	12	7	+5	9	
6	B	(Alberta Soccer Association) Edmonton Scottish	5	2	1	2	7	6	+1	7	
7	A	(Manitoba Soccer Association) FC Winnipeg Lions	5	3	0	2	17	6	+11	9	
8	B	(Newfoundland and Labrador Soccer Association) Feildians AA of St. John's	5	1	1	3	6	13	−7	4	
9	B	(PEI Soccer Association) Winsloe-Charlottetown Royals	5	1	0	4	9	11	−2	3	
10	A	(Soccer New Brunswick) Fredericton Picaroons Reds	5	0	0	5	4	32	−28	0	

Source: Canada Soccer
(H) Hosts

=== Goalscorers ===
There were 90 goals scored in 25 matches, for an average of 3.6 goals per match.

4 goals

- (Surrey BB5 United) Farivar Torabi
- (FC Winnipeg Lions) Montassar Trimech

3 goals

- (Feildians AA of St. John's) Emmanuel Dolo
- (West Ottawa Warriors) Malek Belhaj
- (Winsloe-Charlottetown Royals) Jacob Tweel
- (Rapides de Chaudière-Ouest) Wassim Chaouki

2 goals

- (Edmonton Scottish) Almir Gazic
- (Edmonton Scottish) Conor MacDonald
- (Surrey BB5 United) Connor MacMillan
- (Surrey BB5 United) Nicolas Morello
- (FC Winnipeg Lions) Caelan Budhoo
- (FC Winnipeg Lions) Matheus dos Anjos Aquino
- (FC Winnipeg Lions) Aaron Hidalgo-Mazzei
- (FC Winnipeg Lions) Stuart Hodges
- (West Ottawa Warriors) Michael Bastianelli
- (West Ottawa Warriors) Matias Markus
- (Winsloe-Charlottetown Royals) Cohen Reddick-Stevens
- (Rapides de Chaudière-Ouest) Jeremy Morin
- (Rapides de Chaudière-Ouest) Julien Roy-Madore

1 goal

- (Edmonton Scottish) Stefan Gajic
- (Edmonton Scottish) Morgan Graham
- (Edmonton Scottish) Dexter MacLachlan
- (Surrey BB5 United) Yigal Bruk
- (Surrey BB5 United) Marcel de Jong
- (Surrey BB5 United) Yassin Essa
- (Surrey BB5 United) Elie Gindo
- (FC Winnipeg Lions) Hugo Figueiredo
- (FC Winnipeg Lions) Balex Kabamba
- (FC Winnipeg Lions) Nicolas Nadeau
- (FC Winnipeg Lions) Elliott Peddle
- (Fredericton Picaroons Reds) Shreyansh Choudhary
- (Fredericton Picaroons Reds) David Itoafa
- (Fredericton Picaroons Reds) Benjamin Law
- (Fredericton Picaroons Reds) Kenneth Morrison
- (Feildians AA of St. John's) Taj Exley
- (Feildians AA of St. John's) Nicholas Jones
- (Feildians AA of St. John's) Alexandre Nunes
- (Suburban FC of Fall River) Ian Greedy
- (Suburban FC of Fall River) Moe Jaber
- (Suburban FC of Fall River) Ignacio Sanchez
- (Suburban FC of Fall River) William Warren
- (Western Halifax FC) Isaac Geyer
- (Western Halifax FC) Joseph Iatrou
- (Western Halifax FC) Shawn Kodejs
- (Western Halifax FC) Jared Ndopedro
- (Western Halifax FC) Benjamin Thompson
- (West Ottawa Warriors) Ricky Comba
- (West Ottawa Warriors) Braden Curkovic
- (West Ottawa Warriors) Javane Henry
- (West Ottawa Warriors) Owen McKee
- (West Ottawa Warriors) Marco Natoli
- (West Ottawa Warriors) Zach El-Shafei
- (Winsloe-Charlottetown Royals) Charlie Hunter
- (Winsloe-Charlottetown Royals) Max Maund
- (Winsloe-Charlottetown Royals) Sam Smiley
- (Winsloe-Charlottetown Royals) Andrew Stewart
- (Rapides de Chaudière-Ouest) Francis Assouyat
- (Rapides de Chaudière-Ouest) Bastien Aussems
- (Rapides de Chaudière-Ouest) Christophe Lamontagne
- (Rapides de Chaudière-Ouest) Gabriel Levasseur

1 own goal

- (Fredericton Picaroons Reds) Benjamin Law (against FC Winnipeg Lions)
- (FC Winnipeg Lions) Balex Kabamba (against Rapides de Chaudière-Ouest)
- (Winsloe-Charlottetown Royals) Laclan MacEachern (against Western Halifax FC)
