= 2022 Challenge Trophy =

98th edition of amateur cup competition in Canadian soccer

2022 Canada Soccer National Championships
- 2022 Toyota National Championships; French: Championnats nationaux Toyota 2022

Tournament details
- Country: Canada
- Dates: 5–10 October 2022
- Teams: 9

Final positions
- Champions: (Ontario Soccer Association) Gloucester Celtic FC (2nd title)
- Runners-up: (Alberta Soccer Association) Edmonton Green and Gold

Tournament statistics
- Matches played: 20
- Goals scored: 95 (4.75 per match)

Awards
- Best player: MVP (Ontario Soccer Association) Bezick Evraire

The 2022 Canada Soccer National Championships (officially the Toyota National Championships for sponsorship reasons) was the 98th staging of Canada Soccer's amateur football club competition. Gloucester Celtic FC won the Challenge Trophy after they beat Edmonton Green and Gold in the Canadian Final at North Maple Field in Vaughan on 10 October 2022.

Nine teams qualified to the final week of the 2022 National Championships in Vaughan. Teams played either three or four group matches before the medal and ranking matches on the last day.

On the road to the National Championships, Gloucester Celtic FC beat Caledon SC in the 2022 Ontario Cup Final.

== Teams ==
Each of Canada Soccer's thirteen provincial and territorial associations can send one representative to the Challenge Trophy, with teams generally qualifying through a regional preliminary series such as an open cup or league competition.

For the 2022 tournament, ten provincial associations confirmed their participation. New Brunswick's Fredericton Picaroons withdrew from the tournament in September 2022, leaving nine provincial representatives.

Province	Team	Qualified as	Previous appearances in tournament^{1}	Previous best performance	Ref.
(British Columbia Soccer Association) British Columbia	Surrey BB5 United^{2}	British Columbia Provincial Championship winners	1 (**2019**)	**Champions** (2019)	
(Alberta Soccer Association) Alberta	Edmonton Green & Gold	Alberta Soccer Challenge Cup winners	4 (2005, 2011, 2015, 2016)	Runners-up (2005)	
(Saskatchewan Soccer Association) Saskatchewan	SK Classicos	Acclaimed	0 (debut)	—	—
(Manitoba Soccer Association) Manitoba	SC Hellas	Manitoba Soccer Provincial Championship winners	3 (2008, **2009**, 2012)	**Champions** (2009)	
(Ontario Soccer Association) Ontario	Ottawa Gloucester Celtic	Ontario Cup winners	2 (**2013**, 2016)	**Champions** (2013)	
(Soccer Quebec) Quebec	Rapides de Chaudière-Ouest	Coupe du Québec runners-up^{3}	0 (debut)	—	
(Soccer New Brunswick) New Brunswick	~~Fredericton Picaroons Reds~~^{4}	NBPSL Men's League winners	9 (2007, 2011, 2012, 2014, 2015, 2016, 2017, 2018, 2019)	Sixth place (2007, 2019)	
(Soccer Nova Scotia) Nova Scotia	Halifax Dunbrack SC	Nova Scotia Provincial Championship runners-up^{5}	5 (1997, 1998, 1999, 2010, 2013)	Third place (2010)	
(Newfoundland and Labrador Soccer Association) Newfoundland and Labrador	Holy Cross FC	Newfoundland and Labrador Challenge Cup winners	20 (1973, 1979, 1981, 1983, 1984, 1985, 1986, **1988**, 1989, 1992, 1994, 2009, 2010, 2011, 2012, 2014, 2015, 2017, 2018, 2019)	**Champions** (1988)	
(PEI Soccer Association) Prince Edward Island	Winsloe-Charlottetown Royals	PEISA Men's League runners-up^{6}	1 (2013)	Ninth place (2013)	

^{1} Bold indicates champion for that year.
^{2} Competed in previous tournaments as Central City Breakers FC.
^{3} Replaced Royal-Sélect de Beauport as Quebec representatives.
^{4} Withdrew from the tournament in September 2022.
^{5} Replaced Suburban FC as Nova Scotia representatives.
^{6} Replaced Sherwood-Parkdale Rangers as Prince Edward Island representatives.

== Venues ==
Matches were played at two different venues in the Maple and Woodbridge subdivisions of Vaughan.

Maple	Woodbridge
North Maple Regional Park	Vaughan Grove Sports Park
Capacity: 2,000	Capacity: 1,000

== Group stage ==
Competing teams are divided into two groups, playing against one another in a single round-robin and advancing to the final round based on their group positioning.

The preliminary schedule was announced by Canada Soccer on 9 August 2022 without kick-off times, and were later confirmed on 29 September 2022.

Tie-breaking criteria for group play
The following criteria shall be used to determine the final standings:
1. Most points in all group matches;
2. Greater number of points in matches between the teams concerned (head-to-head competition);
3. Greater goal difference in all group matches;
4. Greater number of goals scored in all group matches;
5. Kicks from the penalty mark as per the Laws of the Game, at a time and place decided by the Canada Soccer General Coordinator.

=== Group A ===
Pos	Team	Pld	W	D	L	GF	GA	GD	Pts	Qualification	Alberta Soccer Association	British Columbia Soccer Association	Manitoba Soccer Association	Soccer Quebec	Saskatchewan Soccer Association
1	(Alberta Soccer Association) Edmonton Green & Gold	4	4	0	0	10	1	+9	12	Advance to final	—	—	1–0	2–1	4–0
2	(British Columbia Soccer Association) Surrey BB5 United	4	3	0	1	17	3	+14	9	Advance to third place match	0–3	—	4–0	6–0	7–0
3	(Manitoba Soccer Association) SC Hellas	4	2	0	2	17	8	+9	6	Advance to fifth place match	—	—	—	—	—
4	(Soccer Quebec) Rapides de Chaudière-Ouest	4	1	0	3	9	13	−4	3	Advance to seventh place match	—	—	2–4	—	6–1
5	(Saskatchewan Soccer Association) SK Classicos	4	0	0	4	2	30	−28	0	Ninth place	—	—	1–13	—	—

Source: Canada Soccer
Rules for classification: Tiebreakers
5 October 2022
13:00 UTC−5

(Alberta Soccer Association) Edmonton Green & Gold	2–1	(Soccer Quebec) Rapides de Chaudière-Ouest
Idrizi 24', (yellow card) 90+2'; Onyejelem 78'		Withers 7' (o.g.); Saint-Maurice (yellow card) 73'; Misol-Rodriguez (yellow card) 81'

North Maple Regional Park, Vaughan
Referee: Niko Jecanski
5 October 2022
13:00 UTC−5

(British Columbia Soccer Association) Surrey BB5 United	7–0	(Saskatchewan Soccer Association) SK Classicos
Lakhan (yellow card) 10'; Morello 22', 24', 48', 56'; Giezen 64', 72'; James 81'

North Maple Regional Park, Vaughan
Referee: Robert D'Alesio

6 October 2022
13:00 UTC−5

(British Columbia Soccer Association) Surrey BB5 United	0–3	(Alberta Soccer Association) Edmonton Green & Gold
Lakhan (yellow card) 15' (yellow-red card) 54'; Alfantazi (yellow card) 30'; Morello (yellow card) 36'; Giezen (yellow card) 68'; Pang (yellow card) 88'		Amara 17', (yellow card) 40'; Idrizi 35'; Assem (yellow card) 51'; Haque (yellow card) 68'; Onyejelem 78'

North Maple Regional Park, Vaughan
Referee: Melvin Christopher
6 October 2022
13:00 UTC−5

(Soccer Quebec) Rapides de Chaudière-Ouest	2–4	(Manitoba Soccer Association) SC Hellas
Misol-Rodriguez 7'; Roy-Madore (yellow card) 66'; Jeanneau (yellow card) 70' (red card) 90+1'; Krowiak 86' (o.g.)		Pagano 25', (yellow card) 90'; Cannizzaro (yellow card) 34'; Foderaro 42', (yellow card) 43'; Ifantis (yellow card) 52'; Olowe (yellow card) 66'; Sugumaran 70'; De Luca (yellow card) 90'; Kurbegovic 90+5'

North Maple Regional Park, Vaughan
Referee: Nivin Raizada

7 October 2022
13:00 UTC−5

(British Columbia Soccer Association) Surrey BB5 United	4–0	(Manitoba Soccer Association) SC Hellas
Mehrabi 8', 19'; Pang 40'; Kabbadj 68'; Si (yellow card) 71'		Ifantis (yellow card) 14'; Haiart (yellow card) 30'; Cannizzaro (yellow card) 33'; Foderaro (yellow card) 66'; Sacramento (yellow card) 68'

North Maple Regional Park, Vaughan
Referee: Robert D'Alesio
7 October 2022
13:00 UTC−5

(Alberta Soccer Association) Edmonton Green & Gold	4–0	(Saskatchewan Soccer Association) SK Classicos
Bosch 57'; Zebie 59'; Amara 74'; Jetishi 79'		Maki (yellow card) 69'

North Maple Regional Park, Vaughan
Referee: Sebastian Noshinravani

8 October 2022
13:00 UTC−5

(British Columbia Soccer Association) Surrey BB5 United	6–0	(Soccer Quebec) Rapides de Chaudière-Ouest
Desrosiers 15' (o.g.); de Graaf (yellow card) 21'; Glennon 36'; Morello 60'; Alfantazi 67'; James (yellow card) 82'; Essa 86', 90' (pen.)		Dorval (yellow card) 24'; Attia (yellow card) 90+1'

North Maple Regional Park, Vaughan
Referee: Niko Jecanski
8 October 2022
13:00 UTC−5

(Saskatchewan Soccer Association) SK Classicos	1–13	(Manitoba Soccer Association) SC Hellas
Halyk 65'; Kunkel (yellow card) 68'; Wright (yellow card) 78'; Bishop (yellow card) 90+1'		Douglas 26'; Sugumaran 27', 51', 54', 76', 78', 87'; Martin (yellow card) 50'; Sacramento 70', 79'; De Luca 77', 84', 90'; Kurbegovic 82'

North Maple Regional Park, Vaughan
Referee: Josue Tomas Cascales

9 October 2022
12:15 UTC−5

(Alberta Soccer Association) Edmonton Green & Gold	1–0	(Manitoba Soccer Association) SC Hellas
Withers (yellow card) 50'; Onyejelem 53'; Graham (yellow card) 63'; Huang (yellow card) 77'		Olowe (yellow card) 9'; Foderaro (yellow card) 32'; Haiart (yellow card) 65'

North Maple Regional Park, Vaughan
Referee: Sebastian Noshinravani
9 October 2022
12:15 UTC−5

(Soccer Quebec) Rapides de Chaudière-Ouest	6–1	(Saskatchewan Soccer Association) SK Classicos
Dorval 4'; Morin 8', 83'; Perusse 67'; Jachée 61' (pen.), 78'		Abel 18'

North Maple Regional Park, Vaughan
Referee: Ryan Schwenger

=== Group B ===
Pos	Team	Pld	W	D	L	GF	GA	GD	Pts	Qualification	Ontario Soccer Association	Newfoundland and Labrador Soccer Association	Soccer Nova Scotia	(PEI Soccer Association)
1	(Ontario Soccer Association) Ottawa Gloucester Celtic	3	2	1	0	8	2	+6	7	Advance to final	—	1–1	3–1	4–0
2	(Newfoundland and Labrador Soccer Association) Holy Cross FC	3	2	1	0	6	3	+3	7	Advance to third place match	—	—	—	3–1
3	(Soccer Nova Scotia) Halifax Dunbrack SC	3	1	0	2	6	7	−1	3	Advance to fifth place match	—	1–2	—	4–2
4	(PEI Soccer Association) Winsloe-Charlottetown Royals	3	0	0	3	3	11	−8	0	Advance to seventh place match	—	—	—	—

Source: Canada Soccer
Rules for classification: Tiebreakers
5 October 2022
09:30 UTC−5

(Ontario Soccer Association) Ottawa Gloucester Celtic	4–0	(PEI Soccer Association) Winsloe-Charlottetown Royals
Kewin 12'; Davies (yellow card) 25'; Babineau 30'; Bryan (yellow card) 82'; Pang 90+2'; Evraire 90+4'		Sanoh (yellow card) 15' (yellow-red card) 32'; Egwatu (yellow card) 90+3'

North Maple Regional Park, Vaughan
Referee: Sebastian Noshinravani
5 October 2022
09:30 UTC−5

(Soccer Nova Scotia) Halifax Dunbrack SC	1–2	(Newfoundland and Labrador Soccer Association) Holy Cross FC
P. Gorski (yellow card) 75'; Parkinson 88'		O'Keefe 26'; Kirby 35', (yellow card) 68'

North Maple Regional Park, Vaughan
Referee: Marko Grubisic

6 October 2022
09:30 UTC−5

(Ontario Soccer Association) Ottawa Gloucester Celtic	1–1	(Newfoundland and Labrador Soccer Association) Holy Cross FC
Bryan 28'; Stojanovic (yellow card) 58'; Dasah (yellow card) 78'; Desjeunes (yellow card) 90+1'		Kirby 18'; DeLong (yellow card) 41'; Stanford (yellow card) 42'

North Maple Regional Park, Vaughan
Referee: Niko Jecanski
6 October 2022
09:30 UTC−5

(Soccer Nova Scotia) Halifax Dunbrack SC	4–2	(PEI Soccer Association) Winsloe-Charlottetown Royals
Benoi 3'; Okello 15'; D. Gorski (yellow card) 48'; Manyot 69', 82'; Wurie (yellow card) 90'		D. Gorski 6' (o.g.); Clarke (red card) 51'; Wright 87'; Akakpo (yellow card) 87'

North Maple Regional Park, Vaughan
Referee: Vasyl Dzikh

8 October 2022
09:30 UTC−5

(Ontario Soccer Association) Ottawa Gloucester Celtic	3–1	(Soccer Nova Scotia) Halifax Dunbrack SC
Stojanovic (yellow card) 9' (yellow-red card) 45+1'; Asabre 18'; Evraire 44'; Dasah (yellow card) 72'; Sanders 86', (yellow card) 88'		Karklins 28', (yellow card) 38'; Hawley (yellow card) 76'; P. Gorski (yellow card) 85'; Ellis (yellow card) 89'

North Maple Regional Park, Vaughan
Referee: Hussein Walji
8 October 2022
09:30 UTC−5

(Newfoundland and Labrador Soccer Association) Holy Cross FC	3–1	(PEI Soccer Association) Winsloe-Charlottetown Royals
O'Keefe 42', 90+1'; O'Brien 52'		Sanoh 49', (yellow card) 71'; Alhaji Ali (yellow card) 83'

North Maple Regional Park, Vaughan
Referee: Nick Vagenas

== Final round ==
The final round (known as Teck Finals Day for sponsorship reasons) pairs equally-ranked opponents from opposite groups to determine a final ranking for the tournament.

10 October 2022
09:00 UTC−5
Seventh place match

(Soccer Quebec) Rapides de Chaudière-Ouest	1–3	(PEI Soccer Association) Winsloe-Charlottetown Royals
Misol-Rodriguez 54'		MacWilliams 10'; Egwatu (yellow card) 34'; Sanoh 40', 88'; Lasia (yellow card) 50'; McKenna (yellow card) 89'

Vaughan Grove Sports Park, Vaughan
Referee: Marko Grubisic

10 October 2022
09:00 UTC−5
Fifth place match

(Manitoba Soccer Association) SC Hellas	3–1	(Soccer Nova Scotia) Halifax Dunbrack SC
Larson 58', 71'; Olowe (yellow card) 76'; Sugumaran 83'		Wahdan 45'; Manyot (yellow card) 45+2'

North Maple Regional Park, Vaughan
Referee: Carly Shaw-MacLaren

10 October 2022
09:00 UTC−5
Third place match

(British Columbia Soccer Association) Surrey BB5 United	1–6	(Newfoundland and Labrador Soccer Association) Holy Cross FC
Si 28'; Dhillon (yellow card) 80'; Alfantazi (red card) 85'; Kaler (yellow card) 85'		Kirby 2', 39'; Warren 16'; DeLong 41'; O'Keefe 55'; Connors 78'

North Maple Regional Park, Vaughan
Referee: Vasyl Dzikh

Challenge Cup
10 October 2022
12:00 UTC−5
Final

Edmonton Green and Gold	0–2	(Ontario Soccer Association) Ottawa Gloucester Celtic
Haque (yellow card) 90+5'		Sanders 20', (yellow card) 60'; Bryan 21'; Panginas (yellow card) 90+2'; Yoseke (yellow card) 90+5'

North Maple Regional Park, Vaughan
Referee: Robert D'Alesio

== Awards ==
- Most Valuable Player: Bezick Evraire, Ottawa Gloucester Celtic FC
