= Robyn Gayle =

Canadian soccer player (born 1985)

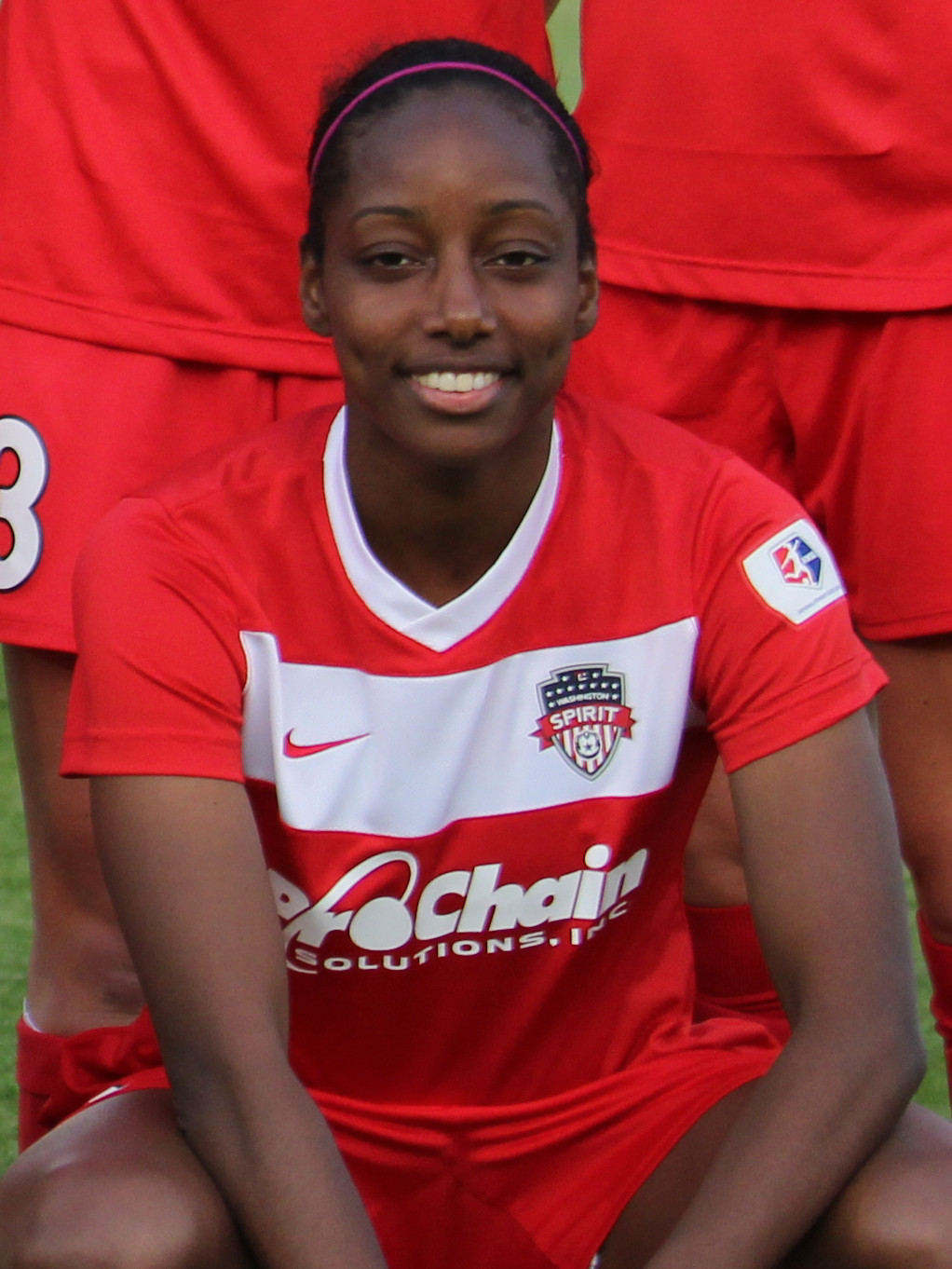

Personal information
- Full name: Robyn Krista Gayle
- Date of birth: 31 October 1985 (age 41)
- Place of birth: Toronto, Ontario, Canada
- Height: 1.68 m (5 ft 6 in)
- Position: Right-back

Youth career
- Mississauga Dixie Hearts
- Oakville SC

College career
Years	Team	Apps	(Gls)
2004–2007	North Carolina Tar Heels		

Senior career*
Years	Team	Apps	(Gls)
2003	Toronto Inferno		
2004-2006	Ottawa Fury Women		
2009	FC Indiana		
2010–2012	Vancouver Whitecaps		
2013–2014	Washington Spirit	31	(2)

International career
2002–2004	Canada U-19		
2006–2015	Canada	81	(2)
Medal record
Women's soccer
Representing Canada
Olympic Games
Bronze medal – third place	2012 London	Team
Pan American Games
Gold medal – first place	2011 Guadalajara	Team
Silver medal – second place	2003 Santo Domingo	Team
- * Club domestic league appearances and goals as of 15 April 2015

Robyn Krista Gayle (born 31 October 1985) is a Canadian former soccer player who was both a Concacaf champion and Olympic Bronze Medal winner. She played her club career in Canada and the United States, including two years with the Washington Spirit of the National Women's Soccer League. She is an honoured member of the Canada Soccer Hall of Fame as part of the Class in 2024.

== Early life ==
=== University of North Carolina ===
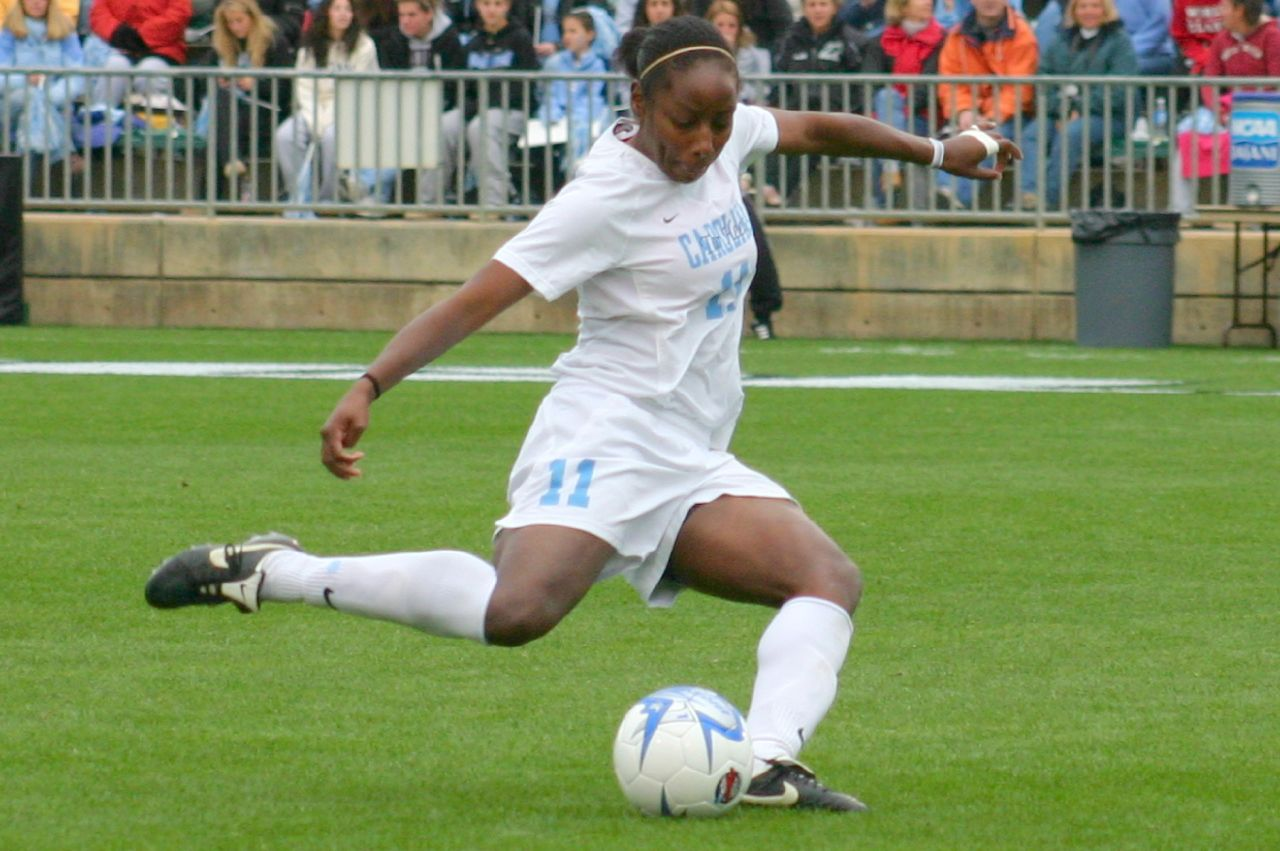
Gayle at North Carolina

Gayle attended the University of North Carolina and was team captain for the Tar Heels in 2006. She led the Tar Heels to their 18th National championship, and was named Defensive MVP of the College Cup the same year.

== Playing career ==
=== Club career ===
Robyn Gayle was a teenager when she won Canada Soccer's 2002 National Championships with Oakville SC. During her college career, she played in the USL W-League with the Toronto Inferno, Ottawa Fury, and Vancouver Whitecaps FC. She reached the USL W-League Championship twice with Ottawa (2005, 2006) and once with Vancouver (2010).

On 11 January 2013, she joined Washington Spirit in the new National Women's Soccer League. She helped Washington reach the NWSL Semi-Finals in 2014.

=== International ===
Gayle represented Canada at the 2007, 2011, and 2015 FIFA Women's World Cup, as well as the 2008 and 2012 Summer Olympics. She was a member of Canada's gold-winning team at the 2011 Pan-American held at Guadalajara, Mexico.

She won a bronze medal as part of Canada's national soccer team at the 2012 Olympics when Canada defeated France 1–0 in the bronze medal match.

== Honours ==
=== Player ===
Oakville SC

- Canada Soccer National Championships: Jubilee Trophy 2002

Ottawa Fury

- USL W-League Northern Division: 2005

FC Indiana

- USL W-League Midwest Division: 2009

Vancouver Whitecaps FC

- USL W-League Western Conference: 2010

University of North Carolina

- NCAA Division I Women's Soccer Championship: 2006

Ontario

- Canada Games: 2001

Canada

- CONCACAF Women's Championship: 2010
- Pan American Games: 2011
- Cyprus Women's Cup: 2008, 2010, 2011

Individual

- College Cup Most Outstanding Defensive Player: 2006
- Mississauga Amateur Athlete of the Year: 2012

=== Staff ===
Canada

- Summer Olympics: 2021
