= Nunavut Soccer Association =

Governing body for soccer in Nunavut, Canada

- Location: Iqaluit, Nunavut, Canada
- President: Kim Walton
- Executive Director: Todd Janes
- Parent organization: Canadian Soccer Association
- Website: https://www.facebook.com/NunavutSoccerAssociation

The Nunavut Soccer Association is the governing body for soccer in the Canadian territory of Nunavut. It is a member association of the Canadian Soccer Association.
