= Northwest Territories Soccer Association =

- Formation: 1990; 36 years ago
- Location: Yellowknife, Northwest Territories, Canada
- President: Alex Godfrey
- Executive Director: Melanie Thompson
- Parent organization: Canadian Soccer Association
- Website: http://nwtsoccer.ca/

The Northwest Territories Soccer Association is the governing body for soccer in the Canadian territory of the Northwest Territories. It is a member association of the Canadian Soccer Association.
