= 1988 Canadian National Challenge Cup =

1988 Canada Soccer National Championships
Tournament details
- Country: Canada

Final positions
- Champions: Holy Cross FC (1st title)
- Runners-up: Edmonton Ital Canadian SC

The 1988 Canada Soccer National Championships was the 66th staging of Canada Soccer's domestic football club competition. Holy Cross FC from St. John's won the Challenge Trophy after they beat Edmonton Ital Canadian SC in the Canadian Final in Saskatoon on 10 October 1988.

Six teams qualified to the final weekend of the 1988 National Championships in Saskatoon. Holy Cross FC won their group ahead of Winnipeg Italia SC and Saskatchewan Huskies while Edmonton Ital Canadian SC won their group ahead of Norvan ANAF and Toronto SC Braga Arsenal.

On the road to the National Championships, Holy Cross FC beat Lawn Sharmrocks in the Newfoundland final and then both Charlottetown Olde Dublin Pub and Dartmouth United SC in the Atlantic Regional Playoff.

Six members from 1988 Holy Cross winning team have been elected to the Newfoundland Soccer Hall of Fame.

== Rosters ==
Holy Cross

- Doug Redmond (manager)
- Bern Tobin (manager)
- Brian Murphy (coach)
- Gerry 'Farmer' Reddy (assistant coach )
- Bob Thompson
- John Breen
- Paul Mullett
- Bruce Tobin
- Tony Mullett
- Bill Breen
- Barry Piercey
- Gary Breen
- Darryl Smith
- Dick Power
- Bob Breen
- A.J. Breen
- George Joyce
- Gus Richards
- Dean Mullett
- Bernard 'Fox' Reddy
- Bob O'Leary
- Shawn Browne
