= 2011 Challenge Trophy =

2011 Canada Soccer National Championships
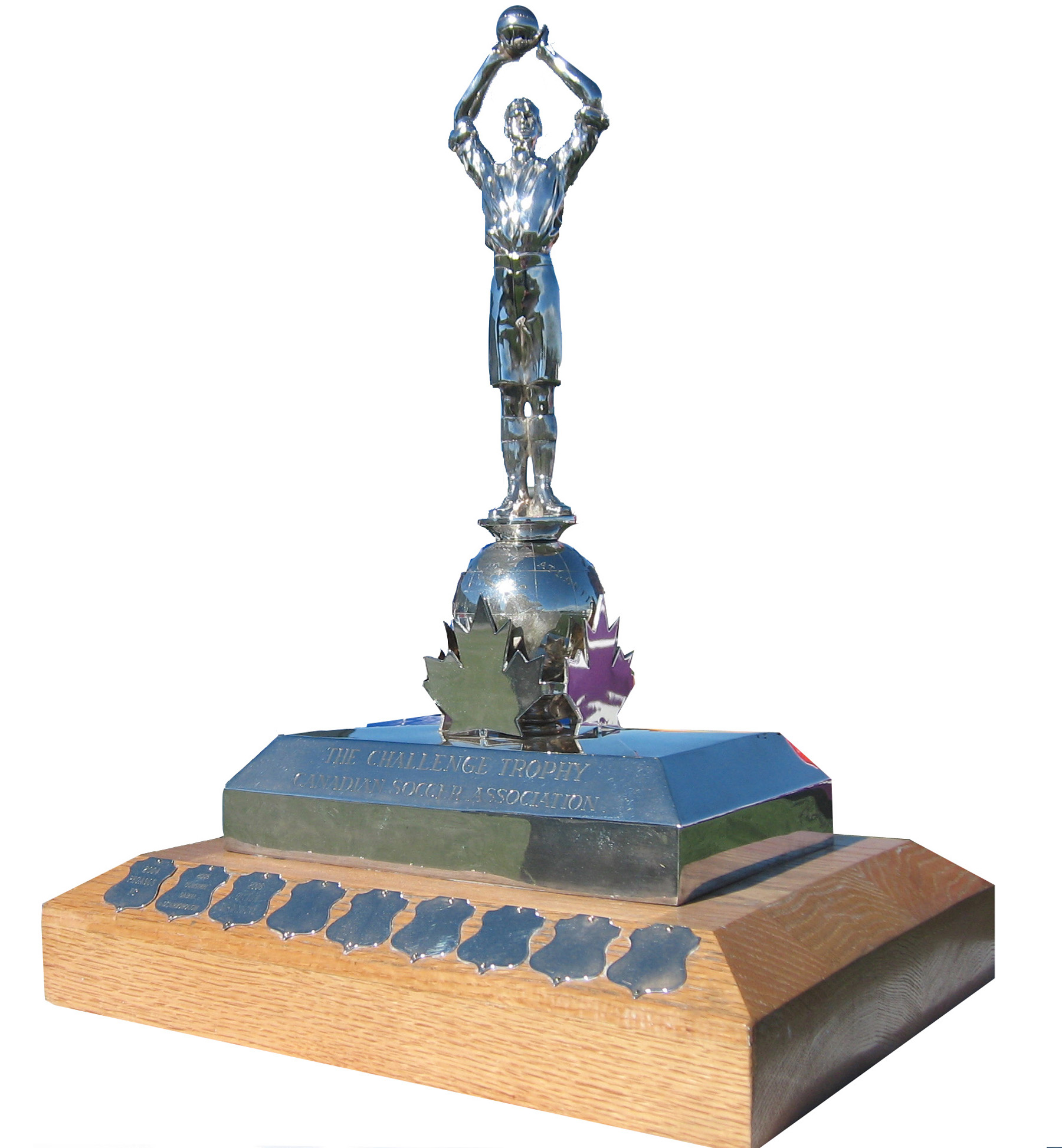
- The Challenge Trophy

Tournament details
- Country: Canada

Final positions
- Champions: Saskatoon HUSA Alumni (1st title)
- Runners-up: Surrey ICST Pegasus

The 2011 Canada Soccer National Championships was the 89th staging of Canada Soccer's amateur football club competition. Saskatoon HUSA Alumni won the Challenge Trophy after they beat Surrey ICST Pegasus in the Canadian Final at Illinois Field in Brossard on 10 October 2011.

Twelve teams qualified to the final week of the 2011 National Championships in Brossard. In the Semifinals, Saskatoon HUSA Alumni beat Toronto Celtic while Surrey ICST Pegasus beat Holy Cross FC.

On the road to the National Championships, Saskatoon HUSA Alumni qualified after they finished first in the Saskatchewan provincial series.

== Results ==
=== First round ===
Team 1	Score	Team 2
BC-ICST Pegasus	2-0	NB-Fredericton
NS-NS	2-1	YU-Yukon Selects SC
PE-SPR Soccerstop	0-1	NL-Holy Cross Kirby
ON-Toronto Celtic	5-1	TN-Yellowknife FC
BC-ICST Pegasus	2-1	SK-HUSA Alumni
SK-HUSA Alumni	4-0	NB-Fredericton

== Standings ==
=== Group A ===
Pos	Team	Pld	W	D	L	GF	GA	GD	Pts
1	Sherwood Park Rangers	2	1	0	1	3	2	+1	3
2	Holy Cross	2	1	0	1	3	3	0	3
3	Winnipeg Juventus	2	1	0	1	4	5	−1	3

Source: issuu.com
Rules for classification: 1) points; 2) goal difference; 3) number of goals scored.

=== Group B ===
Pos	Team	Pld	W	D	L	GF	GA	GD	Pts
1	ICST Pegasus	2	2	0	0	4	1	+3	6
2	HUSA Alumni	2	1	0	1	5	2	+3	3
3	Fredericton Picaroons Reds	2	0	0	2	0	6	−6	0

Source: issuu.com
Rules for classification: 1) points; 2) goal difference; 3) number of goals scored.

=== Group C ===
Pos	Team	Pld	W	D	L	GF	GA	GD	Pts
1	CS Mont-Royal Outremont	2	1	1	0	5	1	+4	4
2	Surrey ICST Pegasus	2	1	1	0	3	2	+1	4
3	Yukon Selects S.C.	2	0	0	2	1	6	−5	0

Source: issuu.com
Rules for classification: 1) points; 2) goal difference; 3) number of goals scored.

=== Group D ===
Pos	Team	Pld	W	D	L	GF	GA	GD	Pts
1	Toronto Celtic	2	1	1	0	7	3	+4	4
2	Edmonton Green & Gold	2	1	1	0	6	3	+3	4
3	Yellowknife FC	2	0	0	2	2	9	−7	0

Source: issuu.com
Rules for classification: 1) points; 2) goal difference; 3) number of goals scored.

== Play-offs ==
Quarter-finals
A1	Sherwood Park Rangers	0
D2	Toronto Celtic	1
C1	NS	0
B2	HUSA Alumni	4
D1	Edmonton Green & Gold	0
A2	Holy Cross Kirby	4
B1	ICST Pegasus	1
C2	Mont-Royal Outremont	0

Semi-finals
Toronto Celtic	1
HUSA Alumni	2
Holy Cross Kirby	1
ICST Pegasus	2

Finals
HUSA Alumni	2
ICST Pegasus	0

== Final result ==
Place	Team	Province or Territories
1.	HUSA Alumni	Saskatchewan
2.	ICST Pegasus	British Columbia
3.	Toronto Celtic	Ontario
4.	Holy Cross	Newfoundland & Labrador
5.	Suburban FC	Nova Scotia
6.	Griffons du CS Mont-Royal Outremont	Quebec
7.	Edmonton Green & Gold	Alberta
8.	Sherwood Park Rangers	Prince Edward Island
9.	Winnipeg Juventus	Manitoba
10.	Fredericton Picaroon Reds	New Brunswick
11.	Yellowknife FC	Northwest Territories
12.	Yukon Selects SC	Yukon

== Teams ==
The national competition brings together all provincial champions. The provincial competition formats are all varied, some are leagues with a play-off and some are cups. The following table attempts to highlight all the teams in Canada who have national aspirations.

Team	City / Town	Province	League	Cup
ACBC		BC	Fraser Valley Soccer League	Prelim
PoMo Gunners		BC		Prelim
Juan de Fuca		BC		Prelim
Coquitlam Metro-Ford Wolves		BC		1/4 final
Cowichan		BC		Prelim
ICSF Inter		BC		Prelim
Poco City FC		BC		Prelim
Gordon Head		BC		Prelim
Bays Utd		BC	Vancouver Island Soccer League	1/16 Final
ICST Pegasus		BC	VMSL	Champion
Punjab Hurricanes		BC		1/4 Final
Peace Arch United		BC	Fraser Valley Soccer League	1/16 Final
Delta Utd		BC	VMSL	semi Final
Richmond Hibs		BC		1/16 Final
SUFF		BC		1/16 Final
Columbus Clan F.C.		BC	VMSL	Runner Up
West Van		BC	VMSL	1/4 Final
Gorge FC		BC		1/16 Final
Abby		BC		1/16 Final
Vancouver Thunderbirds		BC	PCSL	semi Final
Calgary Callies	Calagary	AB	AMSL	
Edmonton Drillers	Edmonton	AB	AMSL	
Calgary Dinosaurs	Calgary	AB	AMSL	
Edmonton Green & Gold	Edmonton	AB	AMSL	
Calgary Villains Elite	Calgary	AB	AMSL	
Edmonton Scottish	Edmonton	AB	AMSL	
Lethbridge FC	Lethbridge	AB	AMSL	
Edmonton Croatia Dinamo	Edmonton	AB	AMSL	
Sons of Italy Lions SC		MB	MMSL-P1	Finalist
Winnipeg Lucania FC	Winnipeg	MB	MMSL-P1	QF
SC Hellas		MB	MMSL-P1	SF
WINNIPEG JUVENTUS		MB	MMSL-P1	Finalist
GERMANIA		MB	MMSL-P1	QF
ITAL INTER		MB	MMSL-P1	SF
UNITED WESTON		MB	MMSL-P1	Group Stage
DYNAMO KYIV	Winnipeg	MB	MMSL-P2	Group Stage
INTERNAZIONALE		MB	MMSL-P2	Group Stage
CELTIC		MB	MMSL-P2	Group Stage (defaulted last game)
POLONIA		MB	MMSL-P2	Group Stage (defaulted last game)
GRANITE UNITED		MB	MMSL-P2	Group Stage
NKMB SAINTS		MB	MMSL-P2	Group Stage (defaulted last game)
WINKLER STORM		MB	MMSL-1	Withdrew
ADRIATIK		MB	MMSL-3	QF
INSPIRE FC	Brandon, Manitoba	MB	MMSL-6	QF
Royal Select Beauport	Beauport, Quebec City	QC	LSEQ 1st Division	1/16 final
Rapides de Chaudière-Ouest	Charny, Quebec	QC	LSEQ 2nd Division	QF
Kirkland-Dorval United	Dorval & Kirkland, Quebec	QC	LSEQ 2nd Division	1/16 final
Vallee-du-Richelieu	Example	QC	Example	1/8 final
Lasalle-Lakeshore United	LaSalle, Quebec	QC	Example	QF
Blainville	Blainville, Quebec	QC	Example	1/16 final
Casalciprano Anjou 2	Anjou, Quebec	QC	Example	1/8 final
Dorion-Vaudreuil AA	Example	QC	Example	1/16 final
Charlesboug	Charlesbourg, Quebec City	QC	Example	1/16 final
Hull	Example	QC	Example	1/8 final
Le Laser AA	Joliette	QC	Example	1/16 final
Monteuil U21	Example	QC	Example	QF
Riveres-des-Prairies	Rivière-des-Prairies–Pointe-aux-Trembles	QC	Example	1/8 final
Pointe-Claire AA	Pointe-Claire	QC	Example	1/16 final
Mont-Royal Outremont	Example	QC	Example	QF
Casalciprano Anjou 1	Anjou, Quebec	QC	Example	1/16 final
Corfinium St-Leonard	Anjou, Quebec	QC	Example	QF
Boreal Rouyn-Noranda	Example	QC	Example	1/16 final (forfeit)
Rimouski	Rimouski	QC	Example	1/16 final
Trois-Rivières U21	Trois-Rivières	QC	Example	1/8 final
Association trifluvienne	Example	QC	Example	QF
FC Outaouais U21	Example	QC	Example	1/16 final
Verts de Sherebrooke AA	Example	QC	Example	1/8 final
Celtix du Haut-Richelieu	Example	QC	Example	1/16 final
Panellinios	Example	QC	Example	QF
Longueuil AA	Example	QC	Example	1/16 final
St-Leonard U21	Example	QC	Example	1/16 final
Cosmos de Granby	Example	QC	Example	1/8 final
Celtix du Haut Richelieu	Example	QC	Example	QF
Trois-Rivières AA	Trois-Rivières	QC	Example	1/16 final
St-Hubert U21	Example	QC	Example	1/8 final
Drummondville U21	Example	QC	Example	1/16 final
Fredericton Wanderers	Fredericton	NB	NBPSL	SF
Fredericton Picaroons	Fredericton	NB	NBPSL	Champion
Fundy United	Saint John	NB	NBPSL	Finalist
Codiac First Touch	Moncton	NB	NBPSL	SF
FC Chaleur	Petit-Rocher	NB	NBPSL	QF
Restigouche United	Dalhousie	NB	NBPSL	7th
Olympique Mad Vic	Edmundston, New Brunswick	NB	NBPSL	QF
Halifax Dunbrack	Halifax	NS	NSSL	
Halifax City	Halifax	NS	NSSL	
Dartmouth United	Dartmouth	NS	NSSL	
Suburban FC	Upper Sackville	NS	NSSL	
Valley United	Wolfville	NS	NSSL	
Halifax County	Halifax	NS	NSSL	
Holy Cross Kirby	St. John's	NL	NLCC	
Mt. Pearl	Mount Pearl	NL	NLCC	
St. Lawrence Laurentians	St. Lawrence	NL	NLCC	
CB Auto Strikers FC	Conception Bay South	NL	NLCC	
Feildians Ernst & Young Orenda	St. John's	NL	NLCC	
Soccer Edge	Charlottetown	PEI		Champion
Yukon Selects	Whithehorse	YT		Champion
Yukon Strikers		YT		Finalist
