= 2017 Challenge Trophy =

2017 Canada Soccer National Championships
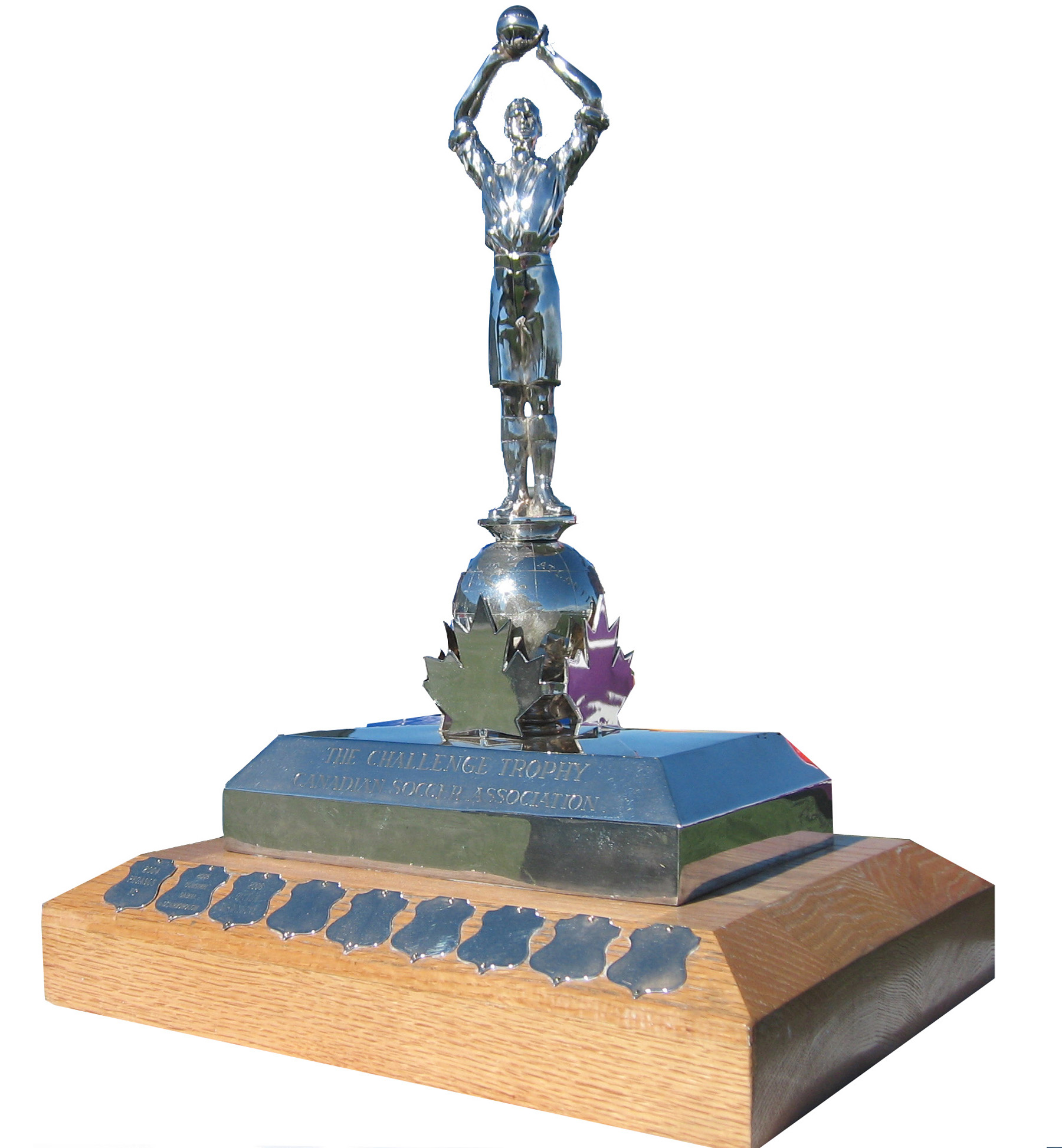
- The Challenge Trophy

Tournament details
- Country: Canada
- Dates: 4-9 October 2017
- Teams: 10

Final positions
- Champions: Western Halifax FC (1st title)
- Runners-up: FC Winnipeg Lions

Tournament statistics
- Matches played: 25
- Goals scored: 91 (3.64 per match)
- Top goal scorer: Joseph Vaz 6 goals

Awards
- Best player: MVP Jhonattan Córdoba

The 2017 Canada Soccer National Championships (officially the Toyota National Championships for sponsorship reasons) was the 95th staging of Canada Soccer's amateur football club competition. Western Halifax FC won the Challenge Trophy after they beat FC Winnipeg Lions in the Canadian Final at the Newton Athletic Park in Surrey on 9 October 2017.

Ten teams qualified to the final week of the 2017 National Championships in Surrey. Each team played four group matches before the medal and ranking matches on the last day. This was the first year that Canada Soccer's National Championships featured Toyota as the title sponsor.

On the road to the National Championships, Western Halifax FC beat Halifax City SC in the 2017 Nova Scotia Final.

== Teams ==
Ten teams were granted entry into the competition; one from each Canadian province. Teams are selected by their provincial soccer associations; most often qualifying by winning provincial leagues or cup championships such as the Ontario Cup.

Province	Team	Manager	Qualification
British Columbia	Vancouver Club Inter FC	Joe Marrello	British Columbia Men's Provincial Cup
Alberta	Calgary Callies	Kevin Randall	Alberta Soccer Provincial Championships
Saskatchewan	Saskatoon HUSA Alumni	Stewart Gillott	Saskatchewan Shield
Nova Scotia	Western Halifax FC	Alan Jazic	Nova Scotia provincial winner
Newfoundland and Labrador	Holy Cross SC	Jeremy Babstock	NL provincial winner
Yukon	Yukon Selects	Jake Hanson	Yukon representative
Manitoba	FC Winnipeg Lions	Tony Nocita	Manitoba Cup winners
Ontario	Durham Celtic FC	Mike Hadden	Ontario Cup winners
Quebec	Celtix Haut-Richelieu	Yannick Rome-Gosselin	Québec LSEQ playoff winners
New Brunswick	Fredericton Picaroons Reds	Dave Rouse	New Brunswick provincial winners

== Venues ==
Newton Athletic Fields in Surrey will serve as the tournament's main venue.

== Group stage ==
The ten teams in the competition are divided into two groups of five teams each, which then play a single-game round-robin format. At the end of the group stage, each team faces the equal-ranked team from the other group to determine a final seeding for the tournament.

=== Group A ===
Pos	Team	Pld	W	D	L	GF	GA	GD	Pts	Qualification	NS	SK	BC	NL	AB
1	(Nova Scotia) Western Halifax FC	4	3	1	0	8	3	+5	10	Advance to first place match	—	—	—	—	—
2	(Saskatchewan) Saskatoon HUSA Alumni	4	2	2	0	6	4	+2	8	Advance to third place match	1–1	—	1–1	1–0	—
3	(British Columbia) Vancouver Club Inter FC	4	2	1	1	8	5	+3	7	Advance to fifth place match	1–2	—	—	—	—
4	(Newfoundland and Labrador) Holy Cross SC	4	1	0	3	3	8	−5	3	Advance to seventh place match	1–3	—	1–4	—	—
5	(Alberta) Calgary Callies	4	0	0	4	3	8	−5	0	Advance to ninth place match	0–2	2–3	1–2	0–1	—

Source: http://www.canadasoccer.com/schedule-results-s15521
Rules for classification: 1) points; 2) head-to-head record; 3) goal difference

=== Group B ===
Pos	Team	Pld	W	D	L	GF	GA	GD	Pts	Qualification	MB	ON	QC	NB	YT
1	(Manitoba) FC Winnipeg Lions	4	3	1	0	12	2	+10	10	Advance to first place match	—	0–0	—	2–1	7–0
2	(Ontario) Durham Celtic FC	4	2	2	0	14	5	+9	8	Advance to third place match	—	—	—	3–3	8–0
3	(Quebec) Celtix Haut-Richelieu	4	2	0	2	7	7	0	6	Advance to fifth place match	1–3	2–3	—	2–1	2–0
4	(New Brunswick) Fredericton Picaroons Reds	4	1	1	2	10	9	+1	4	Advance to seventh place match	—	—	—	—	5–2
5	Yukon Selects	4	0	0	4	2	22	−20	0	Advance to ninth place match	—	—	—	—	—

Source: http://www.canadasoccer.com/schedule-results-s15521
Rules for classification: 1) points; 2) head-to-head record; 3) goal difference

== Final round ==
The final round consists of one game for each club, where they are paired with their equal-ranked opponent from the opposite group to determine a final ranking for the tournament.

October 9, 2017 (gold) First place match	Western Halifax FC (Nova Scotia)	1–0	(Manitoba) FC Winnipeg Lions	Newton Athletic Park - Field #1
12:30 pm	Macrae 3'	Report

October 9, 2017 (bronze) Third place match	Saskatoon HUSA Alumni (Saskatchewan)	1–3	(Ontario) Durham Celtic FC	Newton Athletic Park - Field #4
10:00 am	Peters 74'	Report	Van Beek 47', 77'; Murphy 84'

October 9, 2017 Fifth place match	Vancouver Club Inter FC (British Columbia)	1–1 (4–2 p)	(Quebec) Celtix Haut-Richelieu	Newton Athletic Park - Field #2
11:30 am	Rahmati 34'	Report	Beaumont 75'

October 9, 2017 Seventh place match	Holy Cross SC (Newfoundland and Labrador)	6–1	(New Brunswick) Fredericton Picaroons Reds	Newton Athletic Park - Field #10
10:00 am	Grant 13', 74', 80'; Warren 18'; Dolomount 50'; Barry 79'	Report	K. Morrison 4'

October 9, 2017 Ninth place match	Calgary Callies (Alberta)	4–0	Yukon Selects	Newton Athletic Park - Field #2
9:00 am	Greedy 42', 45'; Kastrati 58'; Jovica 59'	Report

== Tournament ranking ==
Rank	Team
1st place, gold medalist(s)	(Nova Scotia) Western Halifax FC
2nd place, silver medalist(s)	(Manitoba) FC Winnipeg Lions
3rd place, bronze medalist(s)	(Ontario) Durham Celtic FC
4	(Saskatchewan) Saskatoon HUSA Alumni
5	(British Columbia) Vancouver Club Inter FC
6	(Quebec) Celtix Haut-Richelieu
7	(Newfoundland and Labrador) Holy Cross SC
8	(New Brunswick) Fredericton Picaroons Reds
9	(Alberta) Calgary Callies
10	Yukon Selects

== Top goalscorers ==
Rank	Player	Club	Goals
1	Joseph Vaz	Durham Celtic FC	6
2	Mark Van Beek	Durham Celtic FC	5
2	Milad Mehrabi	Vancouver Club Inter FC	5
2	Garrett Peters	Saskatoon HUSA Alumni	5
5	Nicholas Beaumont	Celtix Haut-Richelieu	4
5	AJ Naumiuk	FC Winnipeg Lions	4
7	Jhonattan Cordoba	Western Halifax FC	3
7	Brendan Rattai	FC Winnipeg Lions	3
7	Jacob Grant	Holy Cross SC	3
10	(Ten players tied)		2
