= 2012 Challenge Trophy =

2012 Canada Soccer National Championships
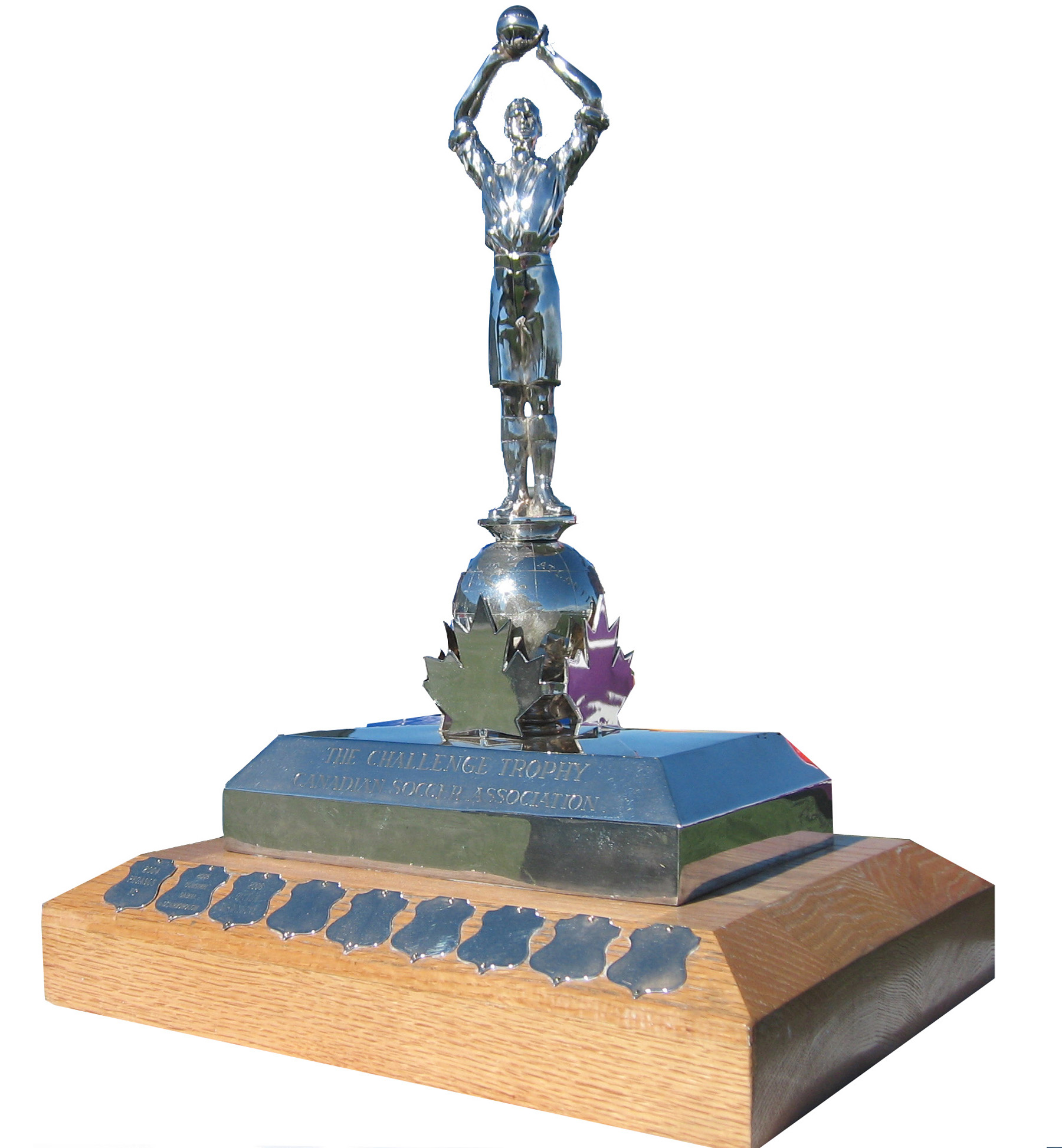
- The Challenge Trophy

Tournament details
- Country: Canada

Final positions
- Champions: Royal-Sélect de Beauport (1st title)
- Runners-up: Edmonton Scottish SC

Awards
- Best player: MVP Samuel Georget

The 2012 Canada Soccer National Championships was the 90th staging of Canada Soccer's amateur football club competition. Royal-Sélect Beauport won the Challenge Trophy after they beat Edmonton Scottish SC in the Canadian Final at Winnipeg Sports Complex in Winnipeg on 8 October 2012.

Twelve teams qualified to the final week of the 2012 National Championships in Winnipeg. In the Semifinals, Royal-Sélect Beauport beat PEI FC while Edmonton Scottish beat Saskatoon HUSA Alumni.

On the road to the National Championships, Royal-Sélect Beauport beat Rapides de Chaudière-Ouest in the Coupe du Québec Final.

== Teams ==
- (Manitoba) FC Winnipeg Lions
- (Manitoba) Hellas FC
- (Quebec) Royal-Sélect de Beauport
- (Prince Edward Island) PEI FC
- (Saskatchewan) HUSA Alumni
- (Alberta) Edmonton Scottish
- (Newfoundland and Labrador) Holy Cross
- (Ontario) AEK London
- (New Brunswick) Fredericton Picaroons
- (British Columbia) Surrey United Firefighters
- (Nova Scotia) Halifax City
- (Northwest Territories) Yellowknife FC

== Finals ==
bronze medal game	HUSA Alumni (Saskatchewan)	3-1	(Prince Edward Island) PEI FC

8-October-2012 gold medal game	(Quebec) Royal-Sélect de Beauport	3-3 (a.e.t) (4-2 p)	(Alberta) Edmonton Scottish
	Bragagnalo (red card) (29') Georget (47'); Nafi Raynauld-Dicko (51') Barrette (77')		McCormack (29') Bartkus (36'); Bartkus (54') Wong (67')	Referee: Geoff Gamble
	Penalties
	Georget (penalty scored); Gutierrez (penalty scored); Davalos (penalty scored); Mana Nga (penalty scored)		Penalty scored Penalty missed
