= Yukon Selects S.C. =

- Full name: Yukon Selects Soccer Club
- Founded: 1998; 28 years ago
- Ground: F.H. Collins Stadium; Whitehorse, Yukon, Canada
- Coordinates: 60.7212°N 135.0568°W
- General Manager: Jacob Hanson
- Head Coach: Ash Jordan
- League: UPSL
- 2020: TBD
- Website: https://www.facebook.com/YukonSelects/

Yukon Selects Soccer Club is a Canadian semi-professional soccer club based in Whitehorse, Yukon. The club's senior team was to begin playing in the Last Frontier Division of the United Premier Soccer League in 2020; however due to the COVID-19 pandemic, this has been delayed.

== Stadium ==
The team's home venue is the stadium of F.H. Collins Secondary School in Whitehorse which meets UPSL National Division I standards.

== History ==
Yukon Selects was founded in 1998. The club went on to represent the Yukon Territory in the Canadian Club National Championships in 2000, 2004, 2005, 2006, 2009, 2011 and 2017. It has also participated in the State Cup of neighbouring Alaska, United States approximately six times, including a title-winning year in 1999. The team were runners-up in the same tournament in 2009, losing on penalty kicks, after earning the championship in the Yukon A-Division that year. The team originally began competing in Alaskan competitions because no high-level opponents from outside of the territory were willing to travel to Whitehorse for matches.

On June 9, 2020 it was announced that the club would become the first Canadian team to compete in the United Premier Soccer League, the fifth tier of the United States soccer league system. The club was placed in The Last Frontier Division of the league, a division which previously consisted exclusively of teams from Alaska. At that time, it was announced that the team would begin play during the 2020 Spring Season. However, because of the 2020 COVID-19 pandemic travel restrictions delayed their first appearance, with a new target debut set for the UPSL Cup in August 2020, pending approval by Canada Soccer. They later hoped to debut in 2021, but their debut has continued to be delayed.

At the time of the team's unveiling, Ash Jordan was introduced as head coach with Jacob Hanson serving as General Manager. Jordan had already been with the club for a number of years, coaching at different age levels including at the 2018 Canada Soccer National Championships U15 Cup. The team's 2–0 victory over Team Nova Scotia that year was called "historic" by the CBC. That year Jordan's U15 team was named Team of the Year by Sport Yukon.

== Record ==
Year	Division	League	Record (W–L–D)	Regular Season	Other
2021	5	UPSL	TBD	TBD, Last Frontier Division	

== Honours ==
- Yukon A-Division:

Champions: 2009

- Alaska Cup: 1

Champions: 1999

Runners-Up: 2006, 2009

Appearance: 2007, 2008, 2017
