= Yukon Soccer Association =

Canadian Soccer Governing Body

- Formation: 1983; 42 years ago
- Location: Whitehorse, Yukon, Canada
- President: Crystal Birmingham
- Executive Director: Alisha Khalik
- Parent organization: Canadian Soccer Association
- Website: https://yukonsoccer.yk.ca/

The Yukon Soccer Association is the governing body for soccer in the Canadian territory of the Yukon. It is a member association of the Canadian Soccer Association. The organization was founded in 1983 as the Yukon Youth Soccer Association, before later changing to its current name.
