= Prince Edward Island Soccer Association =

Governing body for soccer in Prince Edward Island, Canada

- Location: Charlottetown, Prince Edward Island, Canada
- President: Lori Lund
- Executive Director: Jason Eden
- Parent organization: Canadian Soccer Association
- Website: https://peisoccer.com/

The Prince Edward Island Soccer Association is the governing body for soccer in the Canadian province of Prince Edward Island. It is a member association of the Canadian Soccer Association.

== Members ==
As of 2021, the association has twelve members in five regions. It also lists school and university sport associations as affiliate members.

Category	Region	Club
Club members	Prince County	West Prince Storm Soccer Club
Club members	Prince County	Summerside United Soccer Club
Club members	Prince County	Kensington & Area Soccer Club
Club members	Kings County	Eastern Eagles Soccer Club
Club members	Kings County	Souris Lamplighters Soccer Club
Club members	Kings County	Morell Strikers Soccer Club
Club members	Queens County	RC United
Club members	Charlottetown East (Hillsborough United)	Stratford Soccer Club
Club members	Charlottetown East (Hillsborough United)	Sherwood-Parkdale Rangers Soccer Club
Club members	Charlottetown East (Hillsborough United)	North Shore Sharks Soccer Club
Club members	Charlottetown West	Winsloe Charlottetown Royals Football Club
Affiliate members
Affiliate members	Atlantic University Sport	
Affiliate members	Atlantic Collegiate Athletic Association	
Affiliate members	PEI School Athletic Association	
