= Soccer New Brunswick =

Governing body for soccer in New Brunswick, Canada

- Formation: 1965; 61 years ago
- Location: Moncton, New Brunswick, Canada
- President: Kevin Topolniski
- Executive Director: Younes Bouida
- Parent organization: Canadian Soccer Association
- Website: https://www.soccernb.org/

Soccer New Brunswick is the governing body for soccer in the Canadian province of New Brunswick. It is a member association of the Canadian Soccer Association.
