= Soccer Nova Scotia =

Soccer governing association

- Formation: 1912; 114 years ago
- Location: Halifax, Nova Scotia, Canada
- President: David Risk
- Executive Director: Lindsay MacSkill
- Parent organization: Canadian Soccer Association
- Website: https://soccerns.ca/

Soccer Nova Scotia is the governing body for soccer in the Canadian province of Nova Scotia. The body is a member association of the Canadian Soccer Association. It has jurisdiction over the Nova Scotia Soccer League.

== Districts ==
The province is divided into seven districts for soccer:

- Cape Breton District (encompasses all of Cape Breton Island)
- Halifax District (the area bounded on the south by Lunenburg County and on the west by Hants County)
- Harbour East District (all areas within Halifax County southeast of Highway 118)
- Highland District (encompasses the counties of Cumberland, Colchester, Pictou, Guysborough and Antigonish)
- Scotia/East Hants/Sackville District
- South Shore District (encompasses the counties of Yarmouth, Shelbourne, Queens, and Lunenburg)
- Valley District (encompasses the counties of Hants, Kings, Annapolis and Digby)

== History ==
Prior to 1912, there was no association football for civilians. A club had appeared now and again, in Halifax, "like a shooting star," but was not able to live on account of having no opposition.

During the early spring of 1912 one, Mr. L. Leach conceived the idea of forming an Association Football Club at the Nova Scotia Car Works, and with Messrs Bradshaw, Wilkinson, R.G. Costley, H.J. Brownhill, H. Hall, J.S. Rose and F.J. Rowley co-operating with him the N.S. Car Works club was founded on April 2, 1912. These officers were very enthusiastic and completed the first season of eight matches by calling on thirty-five men and boys, to complete their team.

In the fall, Dartmouth Rope Works and the Wanderers Football Club were formed, and Mr. A.H. Leighton secured a trophy from Morton and Craigg's for Competition among all Amateur Association Football Clubs of Halifax and Dartmouth. This competition brought all the Naval, Military and Civilian Clubs together in friendly combat, and under the guiding influence of the following Committee: Capt. A.P. Birchall, R.C. Regiment. Lieut. H.B. Germain, R.N. Niobe. H.W. Hones, Wanderers, Secretary T.J. Wilkinson, N.S.C. Works, Treasurer. C.E. Clarke, Rope Works, Dartmouth. F.J. Howley, N.S. Car Works. Sgt. Chew, M. Staff Clerks. The competition was a great success, and the interest created made it evident that the time was ripe for the forming of a Provincial Governing Body.

On November 8, 1912, at a General meeting of the H.A. Cups competition (at which all football clubs were invited), a motion was put to the meeting as follows: "That an Association be formed to be called the Nova Scotia Football Association to accept the Rules of the English Football Association." Carried. A Committee was appointed for preliminary work of organization as follows: T.J. Wilkinson, Chairman, F.H. Gardner, J.H.W. Beach, Corp. Murray, R.C. Regt with F.J. Howley, Secretary. To the hard work of this Committee, we owe a great debt of gratitude, for on February 3, 1913, they secured the services of Fred Barter, President of the Dominion of Canada Football Association for an address on Association Football, and three days later (February 6th), the Nova Scotia Football Association came into being. The clubs that affiliated were: C.P.A.S. Corps, Clan Thistle, Deaf and Dumb, Halifax City, H.M.C.S. Niobe, Nova Scotia Car Works, Royal Canadian Regiment, R.C. Engineers, R.C. Ord. Corps, R.C.G. Artillery, Royal Naval College, and Sons of England all from Halifax. North Star (Dartmouth), New Glasgow Rangers (New Glasgow), Stellarton, Truro Corinthians and Westville Town in Pictou County. The new Association accepted as its standards the English Football Association Rules and Bylaws. Its headquarters were in the Y.M.C.A. Building on Barrington Street in Halifax.

The first competition for the Championship of Nova Scotia was held later in the year and won by Nova Scotia Car Works, who beat Canadian Ord. Corps 3–1 in the final. The names of the winning players were. A.E. Bradshaw, W. Matthews, R. Noon, W. Fairbrother, T, Swinhoe, A. West, J. Scott, A. Ellis, H. Hall H. Smith and W. Hill. At its second annual meeting in 1914, the provincial body elected F.J. Gardner as President and voted to pay the $25 fee and join the Dominion of Canada F.A.

However, within a very short time, the Nova Scotia F.A. found itself facing the outbreak of World War One and had to shut down for the duration. With the resumption of activities following the war, the provincial body was reformed in time to put together a team to play the Scottish F.A. touring team. The Scots, made up of players from the Scottish professional league, won by seven goals to one. The team that represented Halifax was Wilson – O'Dell, Taylor – Fox, Campbell, Hunt – Ferguson, Carpenter, Jamieson, Sellings and Beston, a crowd of 3,000 watched. Later that year the Nova Scotia F.A. sent George W. Crossan, its President, to Toronto to attend the 1921 annual meeting of the Dominion of Canada Football Association. The provincial body continued to operate in 1922 with E.J. Kelly as President, but there doesn't seem to have been another AGM until 1928.

During the 1920s, clearly soccer was very popular in the mines of Cape Breton with Dominion Number 11 winning the Nova Scotia Championship in 1929 and New Waterford winning in 1930 and 1931. However, from 1928 on, the provincial association seems to have continued to operate until 1936. C. Ireland was Secretary in 1929 before in 1931 T. Bruce Taylor was elected President with Thomas Greeley as Secretary-Treasurer. The 1933 AGM was held in Halifax on March 23, with T. Bruce Taylor as President, B.T. Milne Vice-President and Thomas Greeley, again Secretary-Treasurer. In 1934, the AGM was held on July 31 and T. Bruce Taylor was once again elected President with B.T. Milne and Robert Barrett as Vice-Presidents. J. Hurst and B.T. Milne were delegates to the DCFA AGM in Winnipeg in September of that year. In 1935, T. Bruce Taylor was once again President with Lieut. R.C. Hervey as Vice-President and Thomas Greeley as Secretary-Treasurer. This year for the first, time Nova Scotia entered a team for the Dominion Championship. That team was Halifax St. George's Aces, who played the Aldred Soccer Club of Montreal in early August. In the first game Halifax was beaten 6–0 and in the second 6–1. In 1936 T. Bruce Taylor was returned as President, along with Robert Barrett as Vice-President and Thomas Greeley as Secretary-Treasurer. Delegates to the DCFA were Robert Barrett and B.T. Milne. The AGM backed a proposal for the formation of a Maritime Football Association. Beyond this time, no record has been found of the Nova Scotia Football Association being in operation beyond the 1936 season until the years following World War Two.
