= Soccer Québec =

Governing body for soccer in Quebec

- Formation: 1911; 115 years ago
- Location: Laval, Québec, Canada
- President: Pari Arshagouni
- Executive Director: Olivier Plante
- Parent organization: Canadian Soccer Association
- Website: https://www.soccerquebec.org/

Soccer Québec (formerly (French: Fédération Québécoise de Soccer FQS) or the Quebec Soccer Federation (QSF)) is the governing body for soccer in the Canadian province of Quebec. The QSF is one of thirteen provincial and territorial federations members of the Canadian Soccer Association. It is headquartered in Laval.

This federation was founded in 1911 and adopted its current name in 2000.

== Turban ban ==
On June 10, 2013, the Canadian Soccer Association suspended the Quebec Soccer Federation over its refusal to let turban-wearing children play. Quebec's premier Pauline Marois announced her support of the Quebec Soccer Federation's ban and suggested that the CSA has no authority over provincial organizations.

In 2014, the QSF removed the ban after a ruling from FIFA that turbans are allowed for male players.
