= British Columbia Soccer Association =

Governing body of soccer in British Columbia

BC Soccer
- Formation: December 29, 1904; 121 years ago
- Location: Suite 250-3410 Lougheed Highway, Vancouver, British Columbia
- President: Gayle Statton
- Executive Director: Jason Elligott
- Parent organization: Canadian Soccer Association (joined in 1920; 106 years ago)
- Website: www.bcsoccer.net

BC Soccer is the governing body of adult and youth soccer in British Columbia, Canada. They are the head association for all FIFA affiliated soccer associations in BC. BCSA is located in Vancouver, British Columbia's largest city. There are different levels of play under this association. The British Columbia Soccer Premier League (BCSPL) is the highest level of play, followed by the Metro Select League (MSL), and then what was commonly known as "Gold", "Silver", "Bronze", and "House". These categories have now been changed to a divisional tiering beginning with Division 1, Division 2, and so on, where promotion and relegation processes align with professional leagues. These divisions are split by age, gender, and geographic location.

== Sanctioned competitions ==
=== Pro-am (third tier) ===
- British Columbia Premier League (formerly League1 British Columbia)

=== Amateur ===
- Fraser Valley Soccer League
- Pacific Coast Soccer League
- Vancouver Island Soccer League
- Vancouver Metro Soccer League

Each amateur league sends some of their teams to the British Columbia Provincial Soccer Championship.

=== Youth ===
==== BC Soccer Premier League ====
The BC Soccer Premier League or BCSPL is the highest level of youth soccer in the province. It was established in 2011 as a standards-based youth league in partnership with Vancouver Whitecaps FC to support player development pathways at the U13 to U18 age groups. Each season culminates with the BC Premier Cup to determine a provincial champion, where the champions at the U15 and U17 levels will advance to the Canada soccer national championships.

==== Divisional leagues ====
Below the BCSPL, regional youth soccer leagues are divided into tiers of Division 1 (formerly Metro), Division 2 (formerly Gold), and Division 3 (formerly Silver and Bronze), to ensure there is meaningful competition for each participating team. The highest ranked teams in Division 1 and Division 2 leagues qualify for the Provincial A and B Cup competitions.

== BC Soccer member clubs ==
Member Club	City/Location
100 Mile House Youth Soccer	100 Mile House
Abbotsford Soccer Association	Abbotsford
Alberni Youth Soccer Association	Port Alberni
Aldergrove Soccer Club	Aldergrove
Bay United Youth Soccer Association	Victoria (Oak Bay)
Burnaby Girls Soccer Club	Burnaby
Chilliwack FC	Chilliwack
Burnaby FC	Burnaby
Comox Valley United Soccer Club	Comox Valley
Cowichan Valley Soccer Club	Cowichan Valley
Coquitlam Metro-Ford Soccer Club	Coquitlam
Douglas Park Soccer Club	Vancouver
Golden Ears United Soccer Club	Golden Ears
Saanich Fusion FC	Saanich, British Columbia
Gorge Soccer Association	Saanich
Guilford Soccer Club	Surrey
Juan de Fuca Soccer Association	Victoria (Westshore - Langford, Colwood, View Royal)
Kamloops Youth Soccer Association	Kamloops
Kelowna Youth Soccer Association	Kelowna
Kensington – Little Mountain Soccer Association	Vancouver
Kitimat Youth Soccer Association	Kitimat
Ladner Soccer Club	Ladner
Lakehill Soccer Association	Victoria (UVIC area)
Langley Youth Soccer	Langley
Lower Island Soccer Association	Lower Vancouver Island
Lynn Valley Soccer Association	Vancouver North Shore
Marpole Soccer Club	Vancouver
Mission Soccer Club	Mission
Mount Seymour Soccer Association	Mount Seymour
Nanaimo United Football Club	Nanaimo
New Westminster Soccer Club	New Westminster
North Coquitlam United Soccer Club	Coquitlam
North Delta Youth Soccer Club	Delta
North Okanagan Youth Soccer Association	Vernon
North Shore Girls Soccer Club	Vancouver North Shore
NVFC Campobasso	North Shore (Greater Vancouver), Burnaby, Vancouver
Oceanside Youth Soccer	Parksville
Peace Arch Soccer Club	Delta
Pemberton Youth Soccer Association	Pemberton
Peninsula Soccer Association	North Saanich
Pitt Meadows Soccer Club	Pitt Meadows
Preston GM Langley FC	Langley
Port Coquitlam Soccer Club	Port Coquitlam
Port Moody Soccer Club	Port Moody
Powell River Youth Soccer Association	Powell River
Prince George Youth Soccer Association	Prince George
Quesnel Youth Soccer Association	Quesnel
Richmond Youth Soccer Association	Richmond
Vancouver United Football Club	Vancouver
Semiahmoo Soccer Club	White Rock
Aldergrove Soccer Club	Aldergrove
Vancouver Island Soccer League	Vancouver Island
West Vancouver Soccer Club	West Vancouver

== See also ==
- British Columbia Provincial Soccer Championship
