= Alberta Soccer Association =

Governing body for soccer in the Canadian province of Alberta

- Founded: 1911; 115 years ago
- Headquarters: Edmonton, Alberta, Canada
- National affiliation: Canadian Soccer Association
- President: JR Figueiredo
- Website: https://albertasoccer.com/

The Alberta Soccer Association (ASA) is the governing body for soccer in the Canadian province of Alberta. The association was formed in 1911 as the Alberta Football Association.

The ASA is a member of the national governing body, the Canadian Soccer Association. The association organizes the highest level of amateur play in Alberta, the Alberta Major Soccer League (AMSL), and also has jurisdiction over the Canadian Major Indoor Soccer League. The winner of AMSL League Cup is also the Alberta Provincial Champion and represents the province in the national amateur championships, the Jubilee Shield and Canadian National Challenge Cup.

The offices of the Alberta Soccer Association are located in Edmonton. They were located in Commonwealth Stadium (Edmonton), which was Canada's National Soccer Stadium until the opening of BMO Field in Toronto in 2007, but in 2008 the association relocated to southeast Edmonton.

== See also ==
- Alberta Major Soccer League
- Edmonton Cup
