= Manitoba Soccer Association =

- Manitoba Soccer Association Logo
- Formation: March 19, 1896
- Location(s): 211 Chancellor Matheson Road Winnipeg, Manitoba, Canada R3T 1Z2
- President: Ramona Rohringer
- Executive Director: Héctor Vergara
- Parent organization: Canadian Soccer Association
- Website: www.manitobasoccer.ca

The Manitoba Soccer Association (MSA) is the governing body for soccer in the Canadian province of Manitoba. The association was formed March 19, 1896 in Brandon, Manitoba, making it the oldest provincial soccer association in Canada.

The MSA is a member of the national governing body, the Canadian Soccer Association.
