= Newfoundland and Labrador Soccer Association =

- Location: Mount Pearl, Newfoundland and Labrador, Canada
- President: Chris Bartlett
- Executive Director: Kevin Marshall
- Parent organization: Canadian Soccer Association
- Website: http://www.nlsa.ca/

The Newfoundland and Labrador Soccer Association is the governing body for soccer in the Canadian province of Newfoundland and Labrador. It is a member association of the Canadian Soccer Association.
