= List of Canadian men's soccer champions =

Despite over 100 years of soccer history, Canada has been without a national soccer league for the majority of its history. The current national league in Canada was founded in 2019 following 26 seasons without one. Throughout history, Canadian clubs have also competed in regional leagues, national championships, and in American professional leagues.

This list focuses on Canadian-run competitions. For modern leagues, only those that are sanctioned by the Canadian Soccer Association as professional or pro–am (division 3 or higher) are included. For historical leagues, only those considered to be "major" by the CSA are included. Individual seasons where a Canadian team was champion of an American-run league also appear here.

== Top division leagues ==
Since the 1960s, four men's professional leagues have been sanctioned as division 1 by the Canadian Soccer Association: the Eastern Canada Professional League, the Canadian Professional Soccer League, the Canadian Soccer League, and the Canadian Premier League.

=== Canadian Professional Soccer League (1983) ===
Year	Champions	Runners-up	Regular season top record
1983	Edmonton Eagles	Hamilton Steelers	Edmonton Eagles

=== Canadian Soccer League (1987–1992) ===
Year	Champions (tot)	Runners-up	Regular season top record
1987	Calgary Kickers	Hamilton Steelers	Calgary Kickers
1988	Vancouver 86ers	Hamilton Steelers	Vancouver 86ers
1989	Vancouver 86ers (2)	Hamilton Steelers	Vancouver 86ers
1990	Vancouver 86ers (3)	Hamilton Steelers	Vancouver 86ers
1991	Vancouver 86ers (4)	Toronto Blizzard	Vancouver 86ers
1992	Winnipeg Fury	Vancouver 86ers	Vancouver 86ers

=== Canadian Premier League (2019–present) ===
Year	Champions (tot)	Runners-up	CPL Shield (tot)	Runners-up
2019	Forge FC	Cavalry FC	Cavalry FC	Forge FC
2020	Forge FC (2)	HFX Wanderers FC	—N/a	—N/a
2021	Pacific FC	Forge FC	Forge FC	Cavalry FC
2022	Forge FC (3)	Atlético Ottawa	Atlético Ottawa	Forge FC
2023	Forge FC (4)	Cavalry FC	Cavalry FC (2)	Forge FC
2024	Cavalry FC	Forge FC	Forge FC (2)	Cavalry FC
2025	Atlético Ottawa	Cavalry FC	Forge FC (3)	Atlético Ottawa
2026	Cavalry FC (2)	Atlético Ottawa	Cavalry FC (3)	Forge FC

=== American league champions ===
This section includes seasons of United States Soccer Federation sanctioned leagues which were won by Canadian teams.

USSF league seasons with Canadian champions
Year	League	Champions	Runners-up	Regular season title^{1}	Runners-up
1976	NASL	**Toronto Metros-Croatia**	Minnesota Kicks	Tampa Bay Rowdies^{1}	New York Cosmos^{1}
1979	NASL	**Vancouver Whitecaps**	Tampa Bay Rowdies	New York Cosmos^{1}	Houston Hurricane^{1}
2017	MLS	**Toronto FC**	Seattle Sounders FC	**Toronto FC**	New York City FC

- **Bold** indicates Canadian club
- **^Note 1** – The NASL did not award any regular season title. The regular season's information was added for historical continuity purposes.

== Lower division leagues ==
=== Canadian Soccer League ===
The Canadian Soccer League was founded in 1998 and has primarily consisted of teams from Ontario. It was sanctioned as a division 3 league in 2010 but was de-sanctioned in 2013.

Year	Champions	Runners-up	Regular season	Runners-up
2010	Brantford Galaxy SC	Hamilton Croatia	York Region Shooters	Serbian White Eagles
2011	Toronto Croatia	Capital City FC	SC Toronto	Toronto Croatia
2012	Toronto Croatia	Montreal Impact Academy	Toronto Croatia	Montreal Impact Academy
2013	SC Waterloo	Kingston FC	Kingston FC	York Region Shooters

=== League1 Canada ===
There are currently four division 3 leagues in Canada: League1 British Columbia (BC), League1 Alberta (AB), League1 Ontario (ON), and Ligue1 Québec (QC). These four leagues belong to League1 Canada which was founded in 2022.

Year	Playoff champions	Playoff runners-up	Regular season	Runners-up	Cups
2012 (QC)	—N/a	—N/a	QC: FC St-Léonard	QC: FC L'Assomption	—N/a
2013 (QC)	—N/a	—N/a	QC: CS Mont-Royal Outremont	QC: FC St-Léonard	QC: CS Mont-Royal Outremont
2014 (QC, ON)	—N/a	—N/a	QC: CS Longueuil; ON: Toronto FC Academy	QC: FC Gatineau; ON: Woodbridge Strikers	QC: FC Gatineau; ON: Vaughan Azzurri
2015 (QC, ON)	—N/a	—N/a	QC: CS Mont-Royal Outremont; ON: Oakville Blue Devils	QC: Lakeshore SC; ON: Woodbridge Strikers	QC: Lakeshore SC; ON: Woodbridge Strikers
2016 (QC, ON)	ON: Vaughan Azzurri	ON: Woodbridge Strikers	QC: CS Mont-Royal Outremont; ON: Vaughan Azzurri	QC: AS Blainville; ON: FC London	QC: AS Blainville; ON: Vaughan Azzurri
2017 (QC, ON)	ON: Oakville Blue Devils	ON: Woodbridge Strikers	QC: AS Blainville; ON: Oakville Blue Devils	QC: Dynamo de Quebec; ON: Sigma FC	QC: AS Blainville; ON: Woodbridge Strikers
2018 (QC, ON)	ON: Vaughan Azzurri	ON: Woodbridge Strikers	QC: AS Blainville; ON: FC London	QC: CS Mont-Royal Outremont; ON: Sigma FC	QC: FC Lanaudière; ON: Vaughan Azzurri
2019 (QC, ON)	ON: Master's FA	ON: FC London	QC: AS Blainville; ON: Oakville Blue Devils	QC: CS Mont-Royal Outremont; ON: Vaughan Azzurri	QC: CS Fabrose
2020 (QC, ON^{1})	—N/a	—N/a	QC: AS Blainville	QC: Ottawa South United	—N/a
2021 (QC, ON)	ON: Guelph United FC	ON: Blue Devils FC	QC: CS Mont-Royal Outremont; ON: Vaughan Azzurri	QC: AS Blainville; ON: Guelph United FC	—N/a
2022 (QC, ON, BC)	ON: Vaughan Azzurri; BC: TSS FC Rovers	ON: Blue Devils FC; BC: Varsity FC	QC: FC Laval; ON: Vaughan Azzurri; BC: Varsity FC	QC: CS Saint-Laurent; ON: Blue Devils FC; BC: TSS FC Rovers	QC: AS Blainville
2023 (QC, ON, BC)	ON: Simcoe County Rovers FC; BC: Whitecaps FC Academy	ON: Scrosoppi FC; BC: Victoria Highlanders FC	QC: CS Saint-Laurent; ON: Scrosoppi FC; BC: Victoria Highlanders FC	QC: Royal-Sélect de Beauport; ON: Simcoe County Rovers FC; BC: TSS FC Rovers	QC: CS Saint-Laurent
2024 (QC, ON, BC, AB)	BC: TSS FC Rovers	BC: Altitude FC	QC: FC Laval; ON: Scrosoppi FC; BC: TSS FC Rovers; AB: Edmonton Scottish	QC: CS Saint-Laurent; ON: Vaughan Azzurri; BC: Altitude FC; AB: Calgary Foothills FC	QC: CS Saint-Laurent; ON: Vaughan Azzurri
2025 (QC, ON, BC, AB)	—N/a	—N/a	QC: CS Saint-Laurent; ON: Woodbridge Strikers; BC: Langley United; AB: Calgary Blizzard SC	QC: AS Laval; ON: Scrosoppi FC; BC: TSS FC Rovers; AB: St. Albert Impact	QC: AS Blainville; ON: Scrosoppi FC

- **^Note 1** – League1 Ontario's 2020 season cancelled due to COVID-19 pandemic.

==== Inter-Provincial Cup ====
The Inter-Provincial Cup was a super cup played between the champions of the two division 3 provincial/regional leagues at the time.

Year	Champions	Score(s)	Runners-up	Location
2014	Toronto FC Academy	4–0; 0–0	CS Longueuil	Brossard, Quebec; Pickering, Ontario
2015	Oakville Blue Devils FC	3–1; 2–2	CS Mont-Royal Outremont	Vaughan, Ontario; Terrebonne, Quebec
2016	CS Mont-Royal Outremont	1–1; 2–1	Vaughan Azzurri	Terrebonne, Quebec; Pickering, Ontario

=== American lower division league champions ===
This section includes seasons of United States Soccer Federation sanctioned leagues which were won by Canadian teams.

USSF league seasons with Canadian champions (Level 2)
Year	Competition	Champions	Runners-up	Regular season	Runners-up
1993	APSL	Colorado Foxes	Los Angeles Salsa	**Vancouver 86ers**	Colorado Foxes
1994	APSL	**Montreal Impact**	Colorado Foxes	Seattle Sounders	Los Angeles Salsa
1995	APSL	Seattle Sounders	Atlanta Ruckus	**Montreal Impact**	Seattle Sounders
1996	APSL	Seattle Sounders	Rochester Rhinos	**Montreal Impact** (2)	Colorado Foxes
1997	USL-1	Milwaukee Rampage	Carolina Dynamo	**Montreal Impact** (3)	Hershey Wildcats
2004	USL-1	**Montreal Impact** (2)	Seattle Sounders	Portland Timbers	**Montreal Impact**
2005	USL-1	Seattle Sounders	Richmond Kickers	**Montreal Impact** (4)	Rochester Raging Rhinos
2006	USL-1	**Vancouver Whitecaps**	Rochester Raging Rhinos	**Montreal Impact** (5)	Rochester Raging Rhinos
2008	USL-1	**Vancouver Whitecaps** (2)	Puerto Rico Islanders	Puerto Rico Islanders	**Vancouver Whitecaps**
2009	USL-1	**Montreal Impact** (3)	**Vancouver Whitecaps**	Portland Timbers	Carolina RailHawks

Bold indicates Canadian club

USSF league seasons with Canadian champions (Below Level 3)
Season	Competition	Playoff champions	Regular season leaders ^{1}
2001	USL2	Westchester Flames	**Calgary Storm**
2008	USL2	**Thunder Bay Chill**	Michigan Bucks
2012	USL2	**Forest City London**	Michigan Bucks
2013	USL2	Austin Aztex	**Thunder Bay Chill**
2015	USL2	**K–W United FC**	Michigan Bucks
2018	USL2	**Calgary Foothills FC**	Des Moines Menace

Bold indicates Canadian club

- **^Note 1** – USL2 does not award any regular season title. The regular season's information was added for historical continuity purposes.

== Historical leagues ==
In the middle of the 20th century, five leagues were considered to be the highest level of Canadian soccer at the time: Pacific Coast Soccer League (PC), National Soccer League (NL), Eastern Canada Professional Soccer League (EC), Québec National League (QC) and the Western Canada Soccer League (WC). These regional leagues have been designated by Canada Soccer as "major leagues".

For leagues that used a fall-spring format, the year in this table indicates the year in which the season ended, e.g. the 1960–61 champion would appear in the 1961 row. Only league seasons designated by Canada Soccer are included in this list.

Season	Playoff champions	Playoff runners-up	Regular season champions	Runners-up
1940 (PC)	—N/a	—N/a	PC: North Shore United FC	PC: ?
1941 (PC)	—N/a	—N/a	PC: Vancouver St. Andrews FC	PC: ?
1942 (PC)	—N/a	—N/a	PC: North Shore United FC	PC: ?
1943 (PC)	—N/a	—N/a	PC: North Shore United FC	PC: ?
1944 (PC)	—N/a	—N/a	PC: Vancouver Boeing FC	PC: ?
1945 (PC)	—N/a	—N/a	PC: Vancouver St. Saviours (City FC)	PC: ?
1946 (PC)	—N/a	—N/a	PC: Vancouver St. Andrews FC	PC: ?
1947 (PC, NL)	—N/a	—N/a	PC: Vancouver St. Andrews FC; NL: Montréal Stelco FC	PC: ? NL: Toronto Ulster United FC
1948 (PC, NL)	NL: Montréal Carsteel FC	NL: Hamilton Westinghouse FC	PC: Vancouver St. Andrews FC; NL East: Montréal Carsteel FC; NL West: Hamilton Westinghouse FC	PC: ? NL East: Montréal Canadair Falcons FC; NL West: ?
1949 (PC, NL)	NL: Toronto East End Canadians FC	NL: Montréal Carsteel FC	PC: North Shore United FC; NL East: Montréal Cancar FC; NL West: Toronto East End Canadians FC	PC: ? NL East: Montréal Stelco FC; NL West: Hamilton Westinghouse FC
1950 (PC, NL)	NL: Hamilton Westinghouse FC	NL: Montréal Canadair Falcons FC	PC: Vancouver St. Andrews FC; NL East: Montréal Canadair Falcons FC; NL West: Hamilton Westinghouse FC	PC: ? NL East: Westmount; NL West: Toronto St. Andrews FC
1951 (PC, NL)	NL: Ukraina SA Toronto	NL: Toronto East End Canadians FC	PC: North Shore United FC; NL: Toronto St. Andrews FC	PC: ? NL: Toronto Ulster United FC
1952 (PC, NL)	NL: Ukraina SA Toronto	NL: Toronto East End Canadians FC	PC: Victoria United FC; NL: Toronto East End Canadians FC	PC: ? NL: Toronto Hungaria
1953 (PC, NL)	NL: Ukraina SA Toronto	NL: Toronto East End Canadians FC	PC: New Westminster Royals FC; NL: Ukraina SA Toronto	PC: ? NL: Toronto Ulster United FC
1954 (PC, NL)	NL: Toronto Ulster United FC	NL: Toronto White Eagle SC	PC: Vancouver City FC; NL: Ukraina SA Toronto	PC: ? NL: Toronto Ulster United FC
1955 (PC, NL)	NL: Toronto Ulster United FC	NL: Toronto White Eagle SC	PC: Vancouver Firefighters FC; NL: Ukraina SA Toronto	PC: ? NL: Toronto Ulster United FC
1956 (PC, NL)	NL: Toronto White Eagle SC	NL: Toronto Italia FC	PC: Westminster Royals FC; NL: Toronto White Eagle SC	PC: ? NL: Toronto Italia FC
1957 (PC, NL)	NL: Toronto Italia FC	NL: Toronto Hungaria	PC: Westminster Royals FC; NL East: Montréal Cantalia FC; NL West: Toronto Italia FC	PC: ? NL East: Hungaria SC Montréal; NL West: Toronto White Eagle SC
1958 (PC, NL)	NL: Hungaria SC Montréal	NL: Toronto Italia FC	PC: Vancouver Hale-Co (City FC); NL: Hungaria SC Montréal	PC: ? NL: Toronto Italia FC
1959 (PC, NL)	NL: Toronto Italia FC	NL: Montréal Cantalia FC	PC: Westminster Royals FC; NL: Montréal Cantalia FC	PC: ? NL: Toronto Italia FC
1960 (PC, NL)	NL: Toronto Italia FC	NL: Montréal Cantalia FC	PC: North Shore United (Carling's); NL: Toronto Italia FC	PC: ? NL: Toronto Sparta
1961 (PC, NL, EC, QC)	NL: Ukraina SA Toronto; EC: Montréal Cantalia FC; QC: SA Ukraina Montréal	NL: Toronto Hungaria; EC: Toronto Italia FC; QC: ?	PC: Westminster Royals FC; NL: Toronto Roma FC; EC: Toronto City SC; QC: Hungaria SC Montréal	PC: ? NL: Montréal Concordia FC; EC: Montréal Cantalia FC; QC: ?
1962 (PC, NL, EC, QC)	NL: Toronto Italian Virtus; EC: Toronto Italia FC; QC: Montréal Germania-Kickers	NL: Ukraina SA Toronto; EC: Toronto City FC; QC: ?	PC: Vancouver Firefighters FC; NL: Olympia-Harmonie Toronto; EC: Toronto Roma FC; QC: Montréal Cantalia FC	PC: ? NL: Ukraina SA Toronto; EC: Toronto City FC; QC: ?
1963 (PC, NL, EC, QC, WC)	PC: Vancouver Firefighters FC; NL: Ukraina SA Toronto; EC: Toronto Italia FC; QC: Montréal Hellenic SC; WC:Lethbridge Hungária SC	PC: Vancouver Columbus FC; NL: Toronto Hakoah; EC: Montréal Cantalia FC; QC: ? WC:Regina Concordia SC	PC: Vancouver Canadians (City FC); NL: Toronto Italian Virtus; EC: Toronto Italia FC; QC: ? WC:Regina Concordia SC	PC: ? NL: Toronto Hakoah; EC:Hamilton Steelers; QC: ? WC: ?
1964 (PC, NL, EC, WC)	PC: Vancouver Firefighters FC; NL: Ukraina SA Toronto; EC: Toronto City FC; WC:Regina Concordia SC	PC: Vancouver Columbus FC; NL: Toronto Abruzzi; EC: Toronto Italia FC; WC:Lethbridge Hungária SC	PC: Vancouver Firefighters FC; NL: Ukraina SA Toronto; EC: Toronto City FC; WC:Regina Concordia SC	PC: ? NL: Montréal Cantalia FC; EC:Toronto Italia FC; WC: ?
1965 (PC, NL, EC, QC)	PC: Vancouver Columbus FC; NL: Toronto Hakoah; EC: Toronto Italia Falcons; QC: Kalena St-Simon Montréal	PC: Vancouver Canadians (City FC); NL: Ukraina SA Toronto; EC: Primo Hamilton FC; QC: ?	PC: Vancouver Firefighters FC; NL: Ukraina SA Toronto; EC: Montréal Italica; QC: Kalena St-Simon Montréal	PC: ? NL: Toronto Hakoah; EC: Toronto Inter Roma; QC: ?
1966 (PC, NL, EC, QC, WC)	PC: Vancouver Columbus FC; NL: Windsor Teutonia SC; EC: Toronto Inter Roma; QC: Kalena St-Simon Montréal; WC: Calgary Buffalo Kickers FC	PC: Victoria United FC; NL: Toronto Croatia; EC: Toronto Italia FC; QC: ? WC: Regina Concordia SC	PC: Vancouver Firefighters FC; NL: Sudbury Italia FC; EC: Toronto Italia FC; QC: Montréal B.K. Johl; WC: Edmonton Canadians	PC: ? NL: Toronto Hellas; EC:Toronto Inter Roma; QC: ? WC: ?
1967 (PC, NL, QC, WC)	PC: North Shore United (Luckies); NL: Windsor Teutonia SC; QC: Hungaria SC Montréal; WC: Calgary Buffalo Kickers FC	PC: Vancouver Columbus FC; NL: Primo Hamilton SC; QC: ? WC: Saskatoon City SC	PC: Victoria O'Keefe FC; NL: Primo Hamilton SC; QC: Lachine Rangers; WC: Edmonton Victoria Canadians	PC: ? NL: Toronto Roma FC; QC: ? WC: ?
1968 (PC, NL, QC, WC)	PC: Vancouver Firefighters FC; NL: Sudbury Italia FC; QC: Verdun Celtic; WC: Calgary Kickers FC	PC: Vancouver Columbus FC; NL: Toronto Hellas; QC: ? WC: Edmonton Victoria Canadians	PC: Victoria O'Keefe FC; NL: Sudbury Italia FC; QC: Superga St-Viateur; WC: Calgary Kickers FC	PC: ? NL: Toronto Hellas; QC: ? WC: ?
1969 (PC, NL, QC, WC)	PC: Vancouver Columbus FC; NL: Toronto Italia FC; QC: ? WC: Vancouver Spartans	PC: Vancouver Firefighters FC; NL: Toronto Hungaria; QC: ? WC: Regina Concordia SC	PC: Vancouver Columbus FC; NL: Toronto First Portuguese; QC: SA Ukraina Montréal; WC: Vancouver Spartans	PC: ? NL: Toronto Hellas; QC: ? WC: Regina Concordia SC
1970 (PC, WC)	PC: Vancouver Columbus FC; WC: Victoria Royals	PC: Victoria O'Keefe FC; WC: Regina Concordia SC	PC: Vancouver Columbus FC; WC Coast: Victoria Royals; WC Praries: Regina Concordia	PC: ? WC: ?
1971 (PC)	PC: Croatia SC Vancouver	PC: Vancouver Columbus FC	PC: Vancouver Columbus FC	PC: ?
1972 (PC)	PC: Victoria West United FC	PC: Vancouver Paul's Tailors FC	PC: Victoria West United FC	PC: ?
1973 (PC)	PC: Westminster Blues SC	PC: Victoria Gorge FC	PC: Westminster Blues SC	PC: ?

== Domestic cups ==
There are two official domestic cups in Canada and both are ongoing. The Challenge Trophy was first contested in 1913 and it is the oldest ongoing national soccer competition in Canada. Played under a variety of names and formats over the years, it is currently contested annually by the amateur champion of each province and played in a centralized location. The Canadian Championship was created in 2008 to be contested by professional clubs from various American leagues to determine a champion of Canada and an entrant to the CONCACAF Champions League.

Prior to 2008 there were some notable attempts to declare a national champion of Canada. The Open Canada Cup existed from 2003 to 2007, but excluded the premier professional clubs and was largely limited to the Ontario area. The Voyageurs Cup was a fan-run competition from 2002 to 2007 which awarded a trophy to the best Canadian team in the USL First Division based on regular season results. The Voyageurs Cup trophy is now awarded to the Canadian Championship winner.

=== Challenge Trophy ===
Year	Champions (tot)	Runners-up
1913	Norwood Wanderers	Lachine
1914	Norwood Wanderers (2)	Fort William CPR
1915	Winnipeg Scottish	Toronto Lancashire FC
1919	Montréal Grand Trunk FC	Winnipeg War Veterans
1920	Hamilton Westinghouse FC	Winnipeg Britannia
1921	Toronto Scottish FC	Ladysmith FC
1922	Calgary Hillhurst FC	Toronto Ulster United FC
1923	Nanaimo City FC Wanderers	Montréal CPR
1924	United Weston FC	Beloeil Canadian Explosives
1925	Toronto Ulster United FC	Nanaimo Wanderers
1926	United Weston FC (2)	Cumberland Cdn. Collieries
1927	Nanaimo City FC Wanderers (2)	Fort William Canadian Legion
1928	Westminster Royals FC	Montréal CNR
1929	Montréal CNR (2)	United Weston FC
1930	Westminster Royals FC (2)	Montréal CNR
1931	Westminster Royals FC (3)	Toronto Scottish FC
1932	Toronto Scottish FC (2)	North Shore United FC
1933	Toronto Scottish FC (3)	Prince Albert City Reds
1934	Verdun Park FC	Prince Albert City Reds
1935	Montréal Aldred	Nanaimo City FC
1936	Westminster Royals FC (4)	United Weston FC
1937	Vancouver Johnston Storage	Toronto Ulster United FC
1938	North Shore United FC	Timmins Dome Mines
1939	Vancouver Radials FC	Montréal Carsteel FC
1946	Toronto Ulster United FC (2)	Fort William Vets
1947	Vancouver St. Andrew's FC	Winnipeg Scottish FC
1948	Montréal Carsteel FC	Vancouver St. Andrews FC
1949	North Shore United FC (2)	Hamilton Westinghouse FC
1950	Vancouver City FC	Winnipeg AN&AF Scottish FC
1951	Toronto Ulster United FC (3)	Vancouver St. Andrew's FC
1952	Montréal Stelco	Westminster Royals FC
1953	Westminster Royals FC (5)	Montréal Hakoah
1954	Winnipeg AN&AF Scottish FC (2)	North Shore United FC
1955	Westminster Royals FC (6)	Ukraina Montréal
1956	Vancouver Hale-Co FC (2)	Winnipeg Germania FC
1957	Ukraina Montréal	North Shore United FC
1958	Westminster Royals FC (7)	Winnipeg AN&AF Scottish FC
1959	Montréal Canadian Alouettes	Westminster Royals FC
1960	Westminster Royals FC (8)	Toronto Golden Mile
1961	Montréal Concordia (2)	Vancouver Firefighters FC
1962	Winnipeg AN&AF Scottish FC (3)	Edmonton Edelweiss
1964	Vancouver Columbus FC	Sudbury Italia FC
1965	Vancouver Firefighters FC	Oshawa Italia FC
1966	British Columbia Selects	Québec
1967	Toronto Balymena United	Calgary Buffalo Kickers
1968	Toronto Royals	Vancouver Columbus FC
1969	Vancouver Columbus FC (2)	Montréal Ukraina
1970	Manitoba Selects	Québec
1971	Vancouver Eintracht	Windsor Maple Leafs
1972	Westminster Blues (9)	Toronto San Fili
1973	Vancouver Firefighters FC (2)	Toronto West Indies Utd.
1974	Calgary Springer Kickers	Windsor Italia
1975	Victoria London Boxing Club	St. Lawrence Laurentians
1976	Victoria West FC	Winnipeg Fort Rouge
1977	Vancouver Columbus FC (3)	St. Lawrence Laurentians
1978	Vancouver Columbus FC (4)	Montréal Elio Blues
1979	Victoria West FC (2)	Olympique LaSalle
1980	Saint John Drydock Islanders	Ottawa Maple Leaf Almrausch
1981	North York Ciociaro SC	Calgary Springer Kickers
1982	Victoria West FC (3)	Saskatoon United
1983	Vancouver Firefighters FC (3)	Windsor Croatia
1984	Victoria West FC (4)	Hamilton Dundas United
1985	Croatia SC Vancouver	Montréal Elio Blues
1986	Hamilton Steelers	Croatia SC Vancouver
1987	Winnipeg Lucania SC	New Westminster QPR
1988	St. John's Holy Cross FC	Edmonton Ital-Canadians
1989	Scarborough Azzuri	Holy Cross FC
1990	Vancouver Firefighters FC (4)	Dartmouth United
1991	NorVan ANAF	Scarborough Azzuri
1992	NorVan ANAF (2)	Edmonton Scottish
1993	Vancouver Westside Rino	Calommiers Longueuil
1994	Edmonton Ital Canadians SC	Scarborough Azzurri
1995	Mistral-Estrie	Halifax King of Donair
1996	Vancouver Westside	Cosmos Lasalle
1997	Edmonton Ital Canadians SC (2)	North Shore Pegasus
1998	Riviere des Prairies	Hamilton Serbian
1999	Calgary Celtic	Coquitlam Metro Ford SC
2000	Winnipeg Lucania SC (2)	Vancouver Westside
2001	Halifax King of Donair	Victoria Gorge FC
2002	Winnipeg Sons of Italy	St. Lawrence Laurentians

=== Open Canada Cup ===
Year	Champions (tot)	Runners-up
2003	London City	Metro Lions
2004	Windsor Border Stars	Ottawa St. Anthony Italia
2005	Windsor Border Stars (2)	London City
2006	Ottawa St. Anthony Italia	Toronto Lynx
2007	Trois-Rivières Attak	Columbus Clan FC

=== Canadian Championship ===
Year	Champions (tot)	Runners-up
2008	Montreal Impact (1)	Toronto FC
2009	Toronto FC	Vancouver Whitecaps
2010	Toronto FC (2)	Vancouver Whitecaps
2011	Toronto FC (3)	Vancouver Whitecaps FC
2012	Toronto FC (4)	Vancouver Whitecaps FC
2013	Montreal Impact (2)	Vancouver Whitecaps FC
2014	Montreal Impact (3)	Toronto FC
2015	Vancouver Whitecaps FC	Montreal Impact
2016	Toronto FC (5)	Vancouver Whitecaps FC
2017	Toronto FC (6)	Montreal Impact
2018	Toronto FC (7)	Vancouver Whitecaps FC
2019	Montreal Impact (4)	Toronto FC
2020	Toronto FC (8)	Forge FC
2021	CF Montréal (5)	Toronto FC
2022	Vancouver Whitecaps FC (2)	Toronto FC
2023	Vancouver Whitecaps FC (3)	CF Montréal
2024	Vancouver Whitecaps FC (4)	Toronto FC
2025	Vancouver Whitecaps FC (5)	Vancouver FC
2026	Forge FC	CF Montréal

== Most major titles ==
Legend
LC	League championship	DC	Domestic cup
RS	Regular season	†	Defunct club

Team	D1 league championship			D1 regular season title^{1}			Domestic cup^{2}	Total	First major	Last major
Team	(Canada)	(United States)	Total	(Canada)	(United States)	Total	Domestic cup^{2}	Total	First major	Last major
Vancouver Whitecaps FC^{3} ^{4}	4	1	5	0 (Note: Best regular season record in the CSL 5 times.)	0	0	5	10	1979 LC	2025 DC
Toronto FC	0	1	1	0	1	1	8	10	2009 DC	2020 DC
Forge FC	4	0	4	3	0	3	1	8	2019 LC	2026 DC
Cavalry FC	2	0	2	3	0	3	0	5	2019 RS	2026 LC
CF Montréal^{3} ^{4}	0	0	0	0	0	0	5 (Note: Voyageurs Cup winners 11 times.)	5	2008 DC	2021 DC
Atlético Ottawa	1	0	1	1	0	1	0	2	2022 RS	2025 LC
Calgary Kickers †	1	0	1	0 (Note: Best regular season record in the CSL 1 time.)	0	0	0	1	1987 LC	
Edmonton Eagles †	1	0	1	0 (Note: Best regular season record in the CPSL 1 time.)	0	0	0	1	1983 LC	
Pacific FC	1	0	1	0	0	0	0	1	2021 LC	
Toronto Blizzard †	0	1	1	0	0	0	0	1	1976 LC	
Winnipeg Fury †	1	0	1	0	0	0	0	1	1992 LC	

- ^Note 1 – Only MLS (1996 onward) and the CPL (2019 onward, excluding 2020) have had an award for best regular season record
- ^Note 2 – Includes only the current domestic cup (i.e. the Canadian Championship, established in 2008)
- ^Note 3 – The current incarnation is a namesake phoenix club that owns the rights to the original club's history
- ^Note 4 – The club has rebranded and won at least one title under a different name

== See also ==
- List of American and Canadian soccer champions
