= 2019 Challenge Trophy =

2019 Canada Soccer National Championships
- 2019 Toyota National Championships; French: Championnats nationaux Toyota 2019

Tournament details
- Country: Canada
- Dates: 9–14 October 2019
- Teams: 10

Final positions
- Champions: (British Columbia Soccer Association) Central City Breakers FC (1st title)
- Runners-up: (Ontario Soccer Association) Ottawa St. Anthony SC

Tournament statistics
- Matches played: 25
- Goals scored: 108 (4.32 per match)
- Attendance: 2,480 (99 per match)
- Top goal scorer(s): (Manitoba Soccer Association) Ryan Ramjiawan (9 goals)

Awards
- Best player: MVP (British Columbia Soccer Association) Bobby Jhutty

The 2019 Canada Soccer National Championships (officially the Toyota National Championships for sponsorship reasons) was the 97th staging of Canada Soccer's amateur football club competition. Central City Breakers FC won the Challenge Trophy after they beat Ottawa St. Anthony SC in the Canadian Final at King George V Park in St. John's on 14 October 2019.

Central City Breakers FC won the tournament on their debut, defeating Ottawa St. Anthony SC 2–0 in the Canadian Final.

Ten teams qualified to the final week of the 2019 National Championships in St. John's. Each team played four group matches before the medal and ranking matches on the last day.

On the road to the National Championships, Central City Breakers FC beat Rino's FC Tigers Vancouver in the 2019 BC Province Cup Final.

== Teams ==
Each of Canada Soccer's thirteen provincial and territorial associations can send one representative to the Challenge Trophy, with teams generally qualifying through a regional preliminary series such as an open cup or league competition.

For the 2019 tournament, nine provinces and one territory confirmed their participation.

| Province | Team | Qualified as | Previous appearances in tournament^{1} | Previous best performance | Ref. |
|---|---|---|---|---|---|
| (British Columbia Soccer Association) British Columbia | Central City Breakers FC | British Columbia Provincial Championship winners | 0 (debut) | — | |
| (Alberta Soccer Association) Alberta | Edmonton Scottish | Alberta Soccer Challenge Cup winners | 10 (1972, 1979, 1987, 1992, 1996, 2012, 2013, 2015, **2016**, 2018) | **Champions** (2016) | |
| (Saskatchewan Soccer Association) Saskatchewan | Saskatoon Revolution | Saskatchewan Open Cup winners | 1 (2018) | Third place (2018) | — |
| (Manitoba Soccer Association) Manitoba | FC Winnipeg Lions^{2} | Manitoba Soccer Provincial Championship winners | 10 (1996, 1998, **2002**, 2007, 2012, 2013, 2014, 2016, 2017, 2018) | **Champions** (2002) | |
| (Ontario Soccer Association) Ontario | Ottawa St. Anthony SC^{3} | Ontario Cup winners | 2 (1964, **2006**) | **Champions** (2006) | |
| (Soccer Quebec) Quebec | Kodiak de Charlesbourg | Québec LSEQ playoff winners | 0 (debut) | — | — |
| (Soccer New Brunswick) New Brunswick | Fredericton Picaroons Reds | NBPSL Men's League winners | 8 (2007, 2011, 2012, 2014, 2015, 2016, 2017, 2018) | Sixth place (2007) | — |
| (Soccer Nova Scotia) Nova Scotia | United Dartmouth FC^{4} | Nova Scotia Provincial Championship winners | 8 (1982, 1984, 1986, 1987, 1988, 1990, 2014, 2015) | Runners-up (1990) | |
| (Newfoundland and Labrador Soccer Association) Newfoundland and Labrador | Holy Cross FC | Newfoundland and Labrador Challenge Cup winners | 19 (1973, 1979, 1981, 1983, 1984, 1985, 1986, **1988**, 1989, 1992, 1994, 2009, 2010, 2011, 2012, 2014, 2015, 2017, 2018) | **Champions** (1988) | |
| (NWT Soccer Association) Northwest Territories | YK Galaxy FC^{5} | Acclaimed | 6 (2011, 2012, 2013, 2014, 2015, 2018) | Tenth place (2018) | — |

^{1} Bold indicates champion for that year.
^{2} Competed in previous tournaments as Winnipeg Sons of Italy.
^{3} Competed in previous tournaments as Ottawa St. Anthony's Italia FC.
^{4} Competed in previous tournaments as Dartmouth United Oland.
^{5} Competed in previous tournaments as Yellowknife FC.

== Venues ==
Matches were played at four different venues within the St. John's metropolitan area.

| Conception Bay South | Mount Pearl |
|---|---|
| Topsail Field | Smallwood Field |
| Capacity: 750 | Capacity: 2,500 |
Location of venues for the 2019 Challenge Trophy
| Portugal Cove–St. Philip's | St. John's |
| Rainbow Gully Park | King George V Park |
| Capacity: 450 | Capacity: 6,400 |

== Group stage ==
Competing teams are divided into two groups of five teams, playing against one another in a single round-robin and advancing to the final round based on their group positioning.

Tie-breaking criteria for group play
The following criteria shall be used to determine the final standings:
1. Most points in all group matches;
2. Greater number of points in matches between the teams concerned (head-to-head competition);
3. Greater goal difference in all group matches;
4. Greater number of goals scored in all group matches;
5. Kicks from the penalty mark as per the Laws of the Game, at a time and place decided by the Canada Soccer General Coordinator.

=== Group A ===
| Pos | Team | Pld | W | D | L | GF | GA | GD | Pts | Qualification | British Columbia Soccer Association | Alberta Soccer Association | (Soccer New Brunswick) | Newfoundland and Labrador Soccer Association | Manitoba Soccer Association |
|---|---|---|---|---|---|---|---|---|---|---|---|---|---|---|---|
| 1 | (British Columbia Soccer Association) Central City Breakers FC | 4 | 3 | 1 | 0 | 9 | 3 | +6 | 10 | Advance to final | — | 1–1 | 4–0 | 2–1 | 2–1 |
| 2 | (Alberta Soccer Association) Edmonton Scottish | 4 | 2 | 1 | 1 | 9 | 6 | +3 | 7 | Advance to third place match | — | — | 1–2 | — | 2–1 |
| 3 | (Soccer New Brunswick) Fredericton Picaroons Reds | 4 | 2 | 0 | 2 | 8 | 11 | −3 | 6 | Advance to fifth place match | — | — | — | — | — |
| 4 | (Newfoundland and Labrador Soccer Association) Holy Cross FC | 4 | 1 | 1 | 2 | 7 | 9 | −2 | 4 | Advance to seventh place match | — | 2–5 | 3–1 | — | 1–1 |
| 5 | (Manitoba Soccer Association) FC Winnipeg Lions | 4 | 0 | 1 | 3 | 6 | 10 | −4 | 1 | Advance to ninth place match | — | — | 3–5 | — | — |

Source: Canada Soccer
Rules for classification: Tiebreakers
9 October 2019
14:00 UTC−3:30

| (British Columbia Soccer Association) Central City Breakers FC | 2–1 | (Manitoba Soccer Association) FC Winnipeg Lions |
|---|---|---|
| Mehrabi 64'; Clarke 89' | Report | Szulc 55' |

Smallwood Field, Mount Pearl
Attendance: 85
Referee: Ben Hoskins
9 October 2019
18:00 UTC−3:30

| (Newfoundland and Labrador Soccer Association) Holy Cross FC | 2–5 | (Alberta Soccer Association) Edmonton Scottish |
|---|---|---|
| Williams 30', 41' | Report | Hamilton 13', 90' (pen.); Sahota 15'; Carter 80' (o.g.); Hylton 88' |

King George V Park, St. John's
Attendance: 500
Referee: Juan Marquez

10 October 2019
14:30 UTC−3:30

| (Alberta Soccer Association) Edmonton Scottish | 1–2 | (Soccer New Brunswick) Fredericton Picaroons Reds |
|---|---|---|
| Cabrera 69' | Report | Kanneh 28'; Rouse 45' |

Smallwood Field, Mount Pearl
Attendance: 25
Referee: Marko Kalic
10 October 2019
18:00 UTC−3:30

| (British Columbia Soccer Association) Central City Breakers FC | 2–1 | (Newfoundland and Labrador Soccer Association) Holy Cross FC |
|---|---|---|
| Mehrabi 18'; Si 58' | Report | Warren 90' |

King George V Park, St. John's
Attendance: 500
Referee: Brad Doubrough

11 October 2019
14:30 UTC−3:30

| (British Columbia Soccer Association) Central City Breakers FC | 4–0 | (Soccer New Brunswick) Fredericton Picaroons Reds |
|---|---|---|
| Mehrabi 35'; Clarke 48'; Rahmati 88'; Mackinnon 90+3' (o.g.) | Report |

Topsail Field, Conception Bay South
Attendance: 25
Referee: Nicolas Joubert
11 October 2019
18:00 UTC−3:30

| (Newfoundland and Labrador Soccer Association) Holy Cross FC | 1–1 | (Manitoba Soccer Association) FC Winnipeg Lions |
|---|---|---|
| Bonisteel 32' | Report | Figueiredo 27' |

Topsail Field, Conception Bay South
Attendance: 350
Referee: Serge Topalian

12 October 2019
14:30 UTC−3:30

| (Manitoba Soccer Association) FC Winnipeg Lions | 3–5 | (Soccer New Brunswick) Fredericton Picaroons Reds |
|---|---|---|
| Szulc 37'; Lourenco 44'; Rattai 86' | Report | Itoafa 9', 31'; Morrison 21', 60' (pen.); Niyonkuru 73' |

King George V Park, St. John's
Attendance: 50
Referee: Juan Marquez
12 October 2019
16:30 UTC−3:30

| (British Columbia Soccer Association) Central City Breakers FC | 1–1 | (Alberta Soccer Association) Edmonton Scottish |
|---|---|---|
| Clarke 71' | Report | Hylton 81' |

Smallwood Field, Mount Pearl
Attendance: 100
Referee: Sebastian Noshinravani

13 October 2019
09:30 UTC−3:30

| (Newfoundland and Labrador Soccer Association) Holy Cross FC | 3–1 | (Soccer New Brunswick) Fredericton Picaroons Reds |
|---|---|---|
| Grant 32'; Bonisteel 64'; Warren 82' | Report | Sanoh 33' |

Topsail Field, Conception Bay South
Attendance: 150
Referee: Nicolas Joubert
13 October 2019
13:00 UTC−3:30

| (Alberta Soccer Association) Edmonton Scottish | 2–1 | (Manitoba Soccer Association) FC Winnipeg Lions |
|---|---|---|
| Lam 31'; Hylton 75' | Report | Hidalgo-Mazzei 39' |

Smallwood Field, Mount Pearl
Attendance: 35
Referee: Brad Doubrough

=== Group B ===
| Pos | Team | Pld | W | D | L | GF | GA | GD | Pts | Qualification | Ontario Soccer Association | Soccer Nova Scotia | Soccer Quebec | Saskatchewan Soccer Association | (NWT Soccer Association) |
|---|---|---|---|---|---|---|---|---|---|---|---|---|---|---|---|
| 1 | (Ontario Soccer Association) Ottawa St. Anthony SC | 4 | 4 | 0 | 0 | 11 | 1 | +10 | 12 | Advance to final | — | 2–0 | 1–0 | 4–1 | 4–0 |
| 2 | (Soccer Nova Scotia) United Dartmouth FC | 4 | 2 | 1 | 1 | 7 | 2 | +5 | 7 | Advance to third place match | — | — | — | — | 5–0 |
| 3 | (Soccer Quebec) Kodiak de Charlesbourg | 4 | 1 | 2 | 1 | 9 | 2 | +7 | 5 | Advance to fifth place match | — | 0–0 | — | — | 8–0 |
| 4 | (Saskatchewan Soccer Association) Saskatoon Revolution | 4 | 1 | 1 | 2 | 12 | 8 | +4 | 4 | Advance to seventh place match | — | 0–2 | 1–1 | — | 10–1 |
| 5 | (NWT Soccer Association) YK Galaxy FC | 4 | 0 | 0 | 4 | 1 | 27 | −26 | 0 | Advance to ninth place match | — | — | — | — | — |

Source: Canada Soccer
Rules for classification: Tiebreakers
9 October 2019
16:30 UTC−3:30

| (Saskatchewan Soccer Association) Saskatoon Revolution | 1–1 | (Soccer Quebec) Kodiak de Charlesbourg |
|---|---|---|
| Whiting 82' | Report | Le Roy 37' |

Smallwood Field, Mount Pearl
Attendance: 40
Referee: Nicolas Joubert
9 October 2019
16:30 UTC−3:30

| (Ontario Soccer Association) Ottawa St. Anthony SC | 2–0 | (Soccer Nova Scotia) United Dartmouth FC |
|---|---|---|
| Bauld 81' (o.g.); Lubenga 90' | Report |

Topsail Field, Conception Bay South
Attendance: 20
Referee: Sebastian Noshinravani

10 October 2019
14:00 UTC−3:30

| (Soccer Quebec) Kodiak de Charlesbourg | 8–0 | (NWT Soccer Association) YK Galaxy FC |
|---|---|---|
| Perusse 13', 37', 63', 71'; Kouo Dibongue 43', 64'; Tothaud-Mouandza 44'; Chiasson 75' | Report |

Topsail Field, Conception Bay South
Attendance: 20
Referee: Mohammad Mohseni
10 October 2019
17:00 UTC−3:30

| (Ontario Soccer Association) Ottawa St. Anthony SC | 4–1 | (Saskatchewan Soccer Association) Saskatoon Revolution |
|---|---|---|
| Lubenga 31', 77'; Turner 50'; Soukary 54' | Report | Reis 57' |

Smallwood Field, Mount Pearl
Attendance: 20
Referee: Carly Shaw-MacLaren

11 October 2019
14:00 UTC−3:30

| (Ontario Soccer Association) Ottawa St. Anthony SC | 4–0 | (NWT Soccer Association) YK Galaxy FC |
|---|---|---|
| Kalule 9'; Lubenga 43'; Natoli 52'; Turner 88' | Report |

King George V Park, St. John's
Attendance: 20
Referee: Richard Kent
11 October 2019
16:30 UTC−3:30

| (Saskatchewan Soccer Association) Saskatoon Revolution | 0–2 | (Soccer Nova Scotia) United Dartmouth FC |
|---|---|---|
| | Report | Serieys 55'; Miller 85' |

King George V Park, St. John's
Attendance: 50
Referee: Ben Hoskins

12 October 2019
16:30 UTC−3:30

| (Soccer Nova Scotia) United Dartmouth FC | 5–0 | (NWT Soccer Association) YK Galaxy FC |
|---|---|---|
| Miller 2', 17'; Thompson 42'; Marshall 50', 84' | Report |

Rainbow Gully Park, Portugal Cove–St. Philip's
Attendance: 10
Referee: Isabelle Duclos
12 October 2019
17:00 UTC−3:30

| (Ontario Soccer Association) Ottawa St. Anthony SC | 1–0 | (Soccer Quebec) Kodiak de Charlesbourg |
|---|---|---|
| Lubenga 79' | Report |

King George V Park, St. John's
Attendance: 50
Referee: Carly Shaw-MacLaren

13 October 2019
13:00 UTC−3:30

| (Soccer Quebec) Kodiak de Charlesbourg | 0–0 | (Soccer Nova Scotia) United Dartmouth FC |
|---|---|---|
| | Report |

Rainbow Gully Park, Portugal Cove–St. Philip's
Attendance: 50
Referee: Michael Mund
13 October 2019
14:15 UTC−3:30

| (Saskatchewan Soccer Association) Saskatoon Revolution | 10–1 | (NWT Soccer Association) YK Galaxy FC |
|---|---|---|
| Peters 3', 23', 41'; Reis 6', 11', 19', 42'; Bauche 21'; Brown 49', 59' | Report | Danso 16' |

Topsail Field, Conception Bay South
Attendance: 10
Referee: Shannon Tobin

== Final round ==
The final round (known as Teck Finals Day for sponsorship reasons) consists of one game for each team, where they are paired with their equal-ranked opponent from the opposite group to determine a final ranking for the tournament.

14 October 2019
10:00 UTC−3:30
Ninth place match

| (Manitoba Soccer Association) FC Winnipeg Lions | 19–0 | (NWT Soccer Association) YK Galaxy FC |
|---|---|---|
| Ramjiawan 4', 6', 22', 39', 47', 62', 68', 76', 82'; Aitken 10'; Szulc 31'; Hodges 35', 65', 71', 75'; Hidalgo-Mazzei 60'; Harrison 80'; Naumiuk 84', 86' | Report |

Rainbow Gully Park, Portugal Cove–St. Philip's
Attendance: 25
Referee: Richard Kent

14 October 2019
10:00 UTC−3:30
Seventh place match

| (Newfoundland and Labrador Soccer Association) Holy Cross FC | 2–0 | (Saskatchewan Soccer Association) Saskatoon Revolution |
|---|---|---|
| Grant 16'; Bonisteel 37' | Report |

Smallwood Field, Mount Pearl
Attendance: 100
Referee: Michael Mund

14 October 2019
10:00 UTC−3:30
Fifth place match

| (Soccer New Brunswick) Fredericton Picaroons Reds | 0–4 | (Soccer Quebec) Kodiak de Charlesbourg |
|---|---|---|
| | Report | Kouo Dibongue 30', 41'; Morissette 65'; Tothaud-Mouandza 87' |

Topsail Field, Conception Bay South
Attendance: 25
Referee: Brad Doubrough

14 October 2019
09:00 UTC−3:30
Third place match

| (Alberta Soccer Association) Edmonton Scottish | 0–2 | (Soccer Nova Scotia) United Dartmouth FC |
|---|---|---|
| | Report | Serieys 28'; Gaudet 90+3' |

King George V Park, St. John's
Attendance: 20
Referee: Mohammad Mohseni

14 October 2019
12:00 UTC−3:30
Final

| (British Columbia Soccer Association) Central City Breakers FC | 2–0 | (Ontario Soccer Association) Ottawa St. Anthony SC |
|---|---|---|
| Clarke 65'; Mehrabi 90' | Report |

King George V Park, St. John's
Attendance: 200
Referee: Serge Topalian

== Goalscorers ==
There were 108 goals scored in 25 matches, for an average of 4.32 goals per match.

9 goals

- (Manitoba Soccer Association) Ryan Ramjiawan

5 goals

- (Ontario Soccer Association) Shamir Lubenga
- (Saskatchewan Soccer Association) Nathan Reis

4 goals

- (British Columbia Soccer Association) Caleb Clarke
- (British Columbia Soccer Association) Milad Mehrabi
- (Manitoba Soccer Association) Stuart Hodges
- (Soccer Quebec) Marc-Olivier Kouo Dibongue
- (Soccer Quebec) Alexandre Perusse

3 goals

- (Alberta Soccer Association) Oshane Hylton
- (Manitoba Soccer Association) Krzysztof Szulc
- (Newfoundland and Labrador Soccer Association) Isaac Bonisteel
- (Soccer Nova Scotia) Adam Miller
- (Saskatchewan Soccer Association) Garrett Peters

2 goals

- (Alberta Soccer Association) Paul Hamilton
- (Manitoba Soccer Association) Aaron Hidalgo-Mazzei
- (Manitoba Soccer Association) A.J. Naumiuk
- (Soccer New Brunswick) David Itoafa
- (Soccer New Brunswick) Kenny Morrison
- (Newfoundland and Labrador Soccer Association) Jacob Grant
- (Newfoundland and Labrador Soccer Association) Jake Warren
- (Newfoundland and Labrador Soccer Association) Kyle Williams
- (Soccer Nova Scotia) Oscar Marshall
- (Soccer Nova Scotia) Andrew Serieys
- (Ontario Soccer Association) Trevor Turner
- (Soccer Quebec) Jeremy-Nathaniel Tothaud-Mouandza
- (Saskatchewan Soccer Association) David Brown

1 goal

- (Alberta Soccer Association) Sebastian Cabrera
- (Alberta Soccer Association) Sam Lam
- (Alberta Soccer Association) Anoop Sahota
- (British Columbia Soccer Association) Milad Rahmati
- (British Columbia Soccer Association) Boris Si
- (Manitoba Soccer Association) Andrew Aitken
- (Manitoba Soccer Association) Hugo Figueiredo
- (Manitoba Soccer Association) Zach Harrison
- (Manitoba Soccer Association) Anthony Lourenco
- (Manitoba Soccer Association) Brendan Rattai
- (Soccer New Brunswick) Eseaka Kanneh
- (Soccer New Brunswick) Yosua Niyonkuru
- (Soccer New Brunswick) Jason Rouse
- (Soccer New Brunswick) Ibrahima Sanoh
- (NWT Soccer Association) Russell Danso
- (Soccer Nova Scotia) Derek Gaudet
- (Soccer Nova Scotia) Callum Thompson
- (Ontario Soccer Association) Anthony Kalule
- (Ontario Soccer Association) Marco Natoli
- (Ontario Soccer Association) Ibrahim Soukary
- (Soccer Quebec) Pierre-Luc Chiasson
- (Soccer Quebec) Yann Gael Le Roy
- (Soccer Quebec) Julien Morissette
- (Saskatchewan Soccer Association) Mitchell Bauche
- (Saskatchewan Soccer Association) Sam Whiting

1 own goal

- (Soccer New Brunswick) Ryan Mackinnon (against Central City Breakers FC)
- (Newfoundland and Labrador Soccer Association) Harry Carter (against Edmonton Scottish)
- (Soccer Nova Scotia) Zach Bauld (against Ottawa St. Anthony SC)
