= Gene Vazzoler =

Canadian soccer player

Personal information
- Full name: Eugenio Vazzoler
- Date of birth: 25 September 1941
- Place of birth: Torino, Italy
- Height: 1.80 m (5 ft 11 in)
- Position: Centre half

Youth career
- Torino
- Norburn Legion

Senior career*
Years	Team	Apps	(Gls)
1961-1972	Vancouver Columbus FC		
1973-1982	Vancouver Italia; Italian Canadians; Columbus FC		
- * Club domestic league appearances and goals

Gene Vazzoler (25 September 1941) was a former Canadian soccer player. He was a four-time national champion with Vancouver Columbus FC (1964, 1969, 1977, 1978). Born in Turin, Italy, but raised in Burnaby, he is an honoured member of the Canada Soccer Hall of Fame.

In the Pacific Coast League, Vazzoler won three championships with Columbus FC (1968-69, 1969-70, 1970-71). He was an all-star selection, representing British Columbia or Vancouver, four times in a six-year period from 1964 to 1969.

In April 1983, his jersey number 5 was retired by Vancouver Columbus FC. He was the first player from the organisation to have his sweater number retired.

In March 2019, he was inducted to the Canada Soccer Hall of Fame.

== Honours ==
Vancouver Columbus FC

- Pacific Coast League winner (1968-69, 1969-70, 1970-71)
- Canadian Championship (Challenge Trophy) winner (1964, 1969, 1977, 1978)

Individual

- Canada Soccer Hall of Fame (2019)
- Soccer Hall of Fame of British Columbia (2019)
