= Norm Odinga =

Canadian soccer player

Personal information
- Full name: Norman Hendrik Odinga
- Date of birth: February 11, 1963 (age 63)
- Place of birth: Edmonton, Alberta, Canada
- Position: Midfielder

College career
Years	Team	Apps	(Gls)
1984–1985	Alberta		
1988	Alberta		

Senior career*
Years	Team	Apps	(Gls)
1983	Edmonton Eagles	?	(2)
1985–1990	Edmonton Brick Men	71	(22)
1991–1993	Vancouver 86ers	34	(6)
- Edmonton Ital Canadian SC

International career
1983–1987	Canada U23	7	(2)
1989	Canada Futsal	3	(0)
1989	Canada B	4	(0)
1989–1993	Canada	8	(1)
Medal record
Representing Canada
Men's Association football
North American Nations Cup
Third place	1991 United States
- * Club domestic league appearances and goals

Norman Hendrik Odinga (born February 11, 1963) is a Canadian retired international soccer player.

== Club career ==
Odinga was named MVP of the University of Alberta and played for the Edmonton Eagles, Edmonton Brick Men and Vancouver 86ers.

After his professional career, he twice won Canada Soccer's National Championships with Edmonton Ital Canadian SC, in 1994 and 1997. He scored the winning goal in the 1997 Canadian Final at Calgary.

== International career ==
Odinga made his debut for Canada in an April 1989 friendly match against Denmark and earned a total of 8 caps, scoring 1 goal. He also played in a non official match against Mexico in March 1991.

He has represented Canada at the inaugural 1989 FIFA Futsal World Championship.

His final international game was a July 1993 World Cup qualification match against Australia.

=== International goals ===
Scores and results list Canada's goal tally first.

#	Date	Venue	Opponent	Score	Result	Competition
1	April 2, 1992	Royal Athletic Park, Victoria, Canada	China		5–2	Friendly match

== Coaching career ==
He currently is head coach of an U14 girls team in Alberta.

== Honours ==
Canada

- North American Nations Cup: 3rd place, 1991
