= 1940 Dominion of Canada Football Championship =

Tournament details
- Country: Canada

Final positions
- Champions: No winner

The 1940 Dominion of Canada Football Championship was cancelled in July 1940 with no winner decided in Canada Soccer's annual domestic football club competition for the first time since 1918. The series was cancelled after provincial competitions were already underway since late May, but shortly before interprovincial playdowns were scheduled to begin in July.

The Dominion of Canada Football Association cancelled the series in light of a drop in gate receipts across the provincial playdowns. Secretary-treasurer Sam Davidson noted that the interprovincial matches "could only be conducted at a serious loss to both our association and the clubs participating. Our association is not in a position to stand this loss and we believe very few, if any, of the clubs can do so either. In view of the foregoing and the present serious war situation, we feel that this decision is in the best interests of all concerned."

The competition remained cancelled until after the war when the series was reintroduced in 1946. Only three regions participated in that first year back: New Ontario, Ontario and Quebec. Ontario's Toronto Ulster United FC won the Championship on 29 August 1946.
