= 2018 Challenge Trophy =

2018 Canada Soccer National Championships
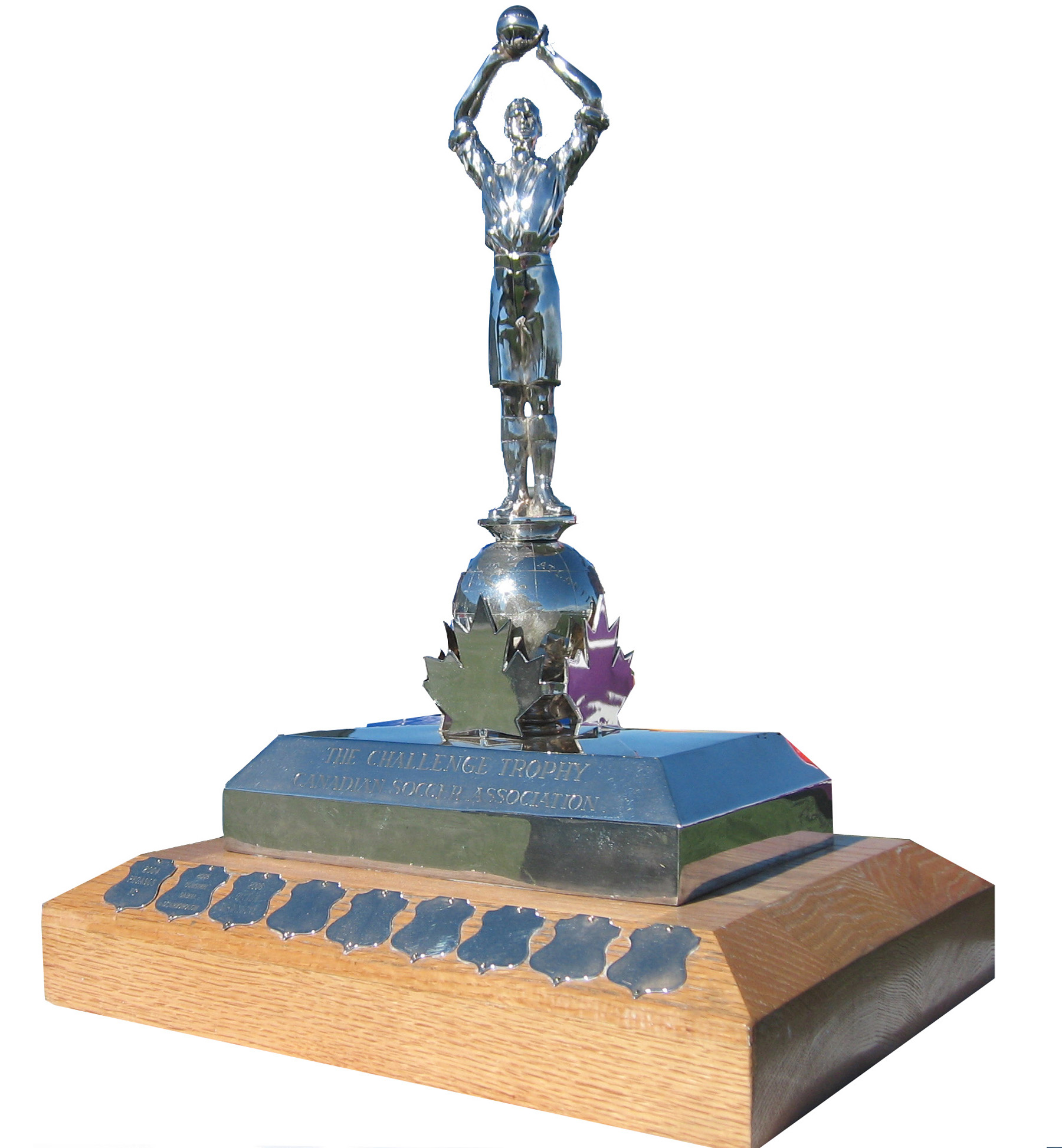
- The Challenge Trophy

Tournament details
- Country: Canada
- Dates: 3-8 October 2018
- Teams: 10

Final positions
- Champions: Surrey BC Tigers Hurricanes (1st title)
- Runners-up: Caledon SC

Awards
- Best player: MVP Nick Soolsma

The 2018 Canada Soccer National Championships (officially the Toyota National Championships for sponsorship reasons) was the 96th staging of Canada Soccer's amateur football club competition. Surrey BC Tigers Hurricanes won the Challenge Trophy after they beat Caledon SC in the Canadian Final at Umea Field in Saskatoon on 8 October 2018.

Ten teams qualified to the final week of the 2018 National Championships in Saskatoon. Each team played four group matches before the medal and ranking matches on the last day.

On the road to the National Championships, Surrey BC Tigers Hurricanes beat Langley United in the 2018 BC Province Cup Final.

== Teams ==
Ten teams were granted entry into the competition; one from each Canadian province. Teams are selected by their provincial soccer associations; most often qualifying by winning provincial leagues or cup championships such as the Ontario Cup.

Province	Team	Manager	Qualification
Alberta	Edmonton Scottish	Kevin Poissant	Alberta Soccer Provincial Championships
British Columbia	BC Tigers Hurricanes	Rob Jandric	British Columbia Men's Provincial Cup
Nova Scotia	Western Halifax FC	Alan Jazic	Nova Scotia provincial winner
Manitoba	FC Winnipeg Lions	Tony Nocita	Manitoba Cup winners
New Brunswick	Fredericton Picaroons Reds	Dave Rouse	New Brunswick provincial winners
Newfoundland and Labrador	Holy Cross SC	Noel Stanford	NL Challenge Cup champion
Northwest Territories	Yellowknife Galaxy	Judon Gregory	Northwest Territories Representative
Ontario	Caledon SC	Steven Hill	Ontario Cup winners
Quebec	Royal Select de Beauport	Samir Ghrib	Québec LSEQ playoff winners
Saskatchewan	Saskatoon Revolution	Stewart Gillott	Saskatchewan Shield

== Group stage ==
The ten teams in the competition are divided into two groups of five teams each, which then play a single-game round-robin format. At the end of the group stage, each team faces the equal-ranked team from the other group to determine a final seeding for the tournament.

== Final round ==
The final round consists of one game for each club, where they are paired with their equal-ranked opponent from the opposite group to determine a final ranking for the tournament.

October 8, 2018 (gold) First place match	Surrey BC Tigers Hurricanes (British Columbia)	7–3	(Ontario) Caledon SC

October 8, 2018 (bronze) Third place match	Saskatoon Revolution (Saskatchewan)	1–1 (7–6 p)	(Newfoundland and Labrador) Holy Cross FC

October 8, 2018 Fifth place match	Edmonton Scottish SC (Alberta)	0–0 (4–2 p)	(Quebec) Royal-Sélect Beauport

October 8, 2018 Seventh place match	Western Halifax FC (Nova Scotia)	1–1 (6–5 p)	(Manitoba) FC Winnipeg Lions

October 8, 2018 Ninth place match	Fredericton Picaroons Reds (New Brunswick)	7–0	(Northwest Territories) Yellowknife YK Galaxy FC
