= Nocita =

Nocita is a surname. Notable people with the surname include:

- Salvatore Nocita (born 1934), Italian television and film director, editor, and screenwriter
- Tony Nocita (born 1963), Canadian soccer player and coach
