= Percy Manuel =

English footballer

Personal information
- Full name: Percival Edmund Manuel
- Date of birth: 21 February 1909
- Place of birth: Wantage, Berkshire, England
- Date of death: 15 August 1983 (aged 74)
- Position: Outside right

Senior career*
Years	Team	Apps	(Gls)
- Toronto Transportation Company
- Marlborough Town
- Oxford City
1933–1934	Swindon Town	0	(0)
1934	→ Trowbridge Town (loan)		
1934–1935	Stourbridge		
1935	Wrexham	2	(0)
- Montréal Carsteel FC
- Marlborough Town
- * Club domestic league appearances and goals

Percival Edmund Manuel (21 February 1909 – 15 August 1983) was an English professional footballer who played as an outside right. He played in both the English Football League and the Canadian National Soccer League throughout his career.

He also represented an Eastern Canada All-Stars team to take on a Scotland XI during Scotland's North American tour of 1935.
