= Cuzzetto =

Cuzzetto is an Italian surname. Notable people with the surname include:

- Joe Cuzzetto (born 1960), Canadian soccer player
- Rudy Cuzzetto (fl. from 2018), Canadian politician in Ontario
