= Andy Menyes =

Canadian soccer player (1934–2022)

Personal information
- Full name: Andy Menyes
- Position: Inside right

Senior career*
Years	Team	Apps	(Gls)
1945	Montréal Wanderers		
1945	Canadian Vickers AFC Montréal		
1947	Hungária SC Montréal		
1947-1949	Montréal Carsteel FC		
1950	Hungária SC Montréal		
1951	Montréal Hakoah FC		
1951-1953	Vancouver St. Andrews FC		
1953-1954	Montréal Hakoah FC		
1955-1956	Montréal Cantalia FC		
1958-59	SA Ukraina Montréal		
- * Club domestic league appearances and goals

Andy Menyes was a Canadian soccer player from the 1940s and 1950s. He was a Dominion of Canada Football Championship winner with Montréal Carsteel FC in 1948. He represented Canada in the 1949 Triner Trophy championship.

Across his career in Montréal and Vancouver, he scored more than 150 goals in all competitions. He also played in California.
