= 1977 Canada Soccer National Championships =

Tournament details
- Country: Canada

Final positions
- Champions: Vancouver Columbus FC (3rd title)
- Runners-up: St. Lawrence Laurentians

The 1977 Canada Soccer National Championships was the 55th staging of Canada Soccer's domestic football club competition. Vancouver Columbus FC won the Challenge Trophy after they beat the St. Lawrence Laurentians in the Canadian Final at Centennial Soccer Field in St. Lawrence, Newfoundland and Labrador on 11 September 1977.

Four teams qualified to the final weekend of the 1977 National Championships in St. Lawrence. In the Semifinals, Vancouver Columbus FC beat Toronto Hakoah while St. Lawrence Laurentians beat Winnipeg Ital-Inter.

On the road to the National Championships, Vancouver Columbus FC beat Victoria West FC in the BC Province Cup and then Edmonton Ital Canadian SC in the interprovincial playdowns.
