= Sam Chedgzoy =

English footballer and manager

Personal information
- Full name: Samuel Chedgzoy
- Date of birth: 27 January 1889
- Place of birth: Ellesmere Port, England
- Date of death: 7 January 1967 (aged 77)
- Place of death: Montreal, Quebec, Canada
- Height: 5 ft 8 1/2 in (1.74 m)
- Position: Outside right

Senior career*
Years	Team	Apps	(Gls)
?–1910	Burnell's Ironworks	?	(?)
1910–1926	Everton	279	(33)
1916–1919	→ West Ham United (guest)	28	(14)
1926–1930	New Bedford Whalers	164	(21)
1930–1939	Montréal Carsteel FC		

International career
1920–1924	England	8	(0)

Managerial career
- 1924: Grenadier Guards
- 1930–1940: Montréal Carsteel FC
- * Club domestic league appearances and goals

Samuel Chedgzoy (27 January 1889 – 7 January 1967) was an English footballer who changed the laws of the game. He played professionally for Everton, the New Bedford Whalers and Montréal Carsteel FC. He also earned eight caps with the England national team.

== Biography ==
=== Club career ===
Born 27 January 1889 in Ellesmere Port, England, Chedgzoy began his professional career with Everton in 1910, joining the club from amateur side Burnell's Ironworks. He spent sixteen seasons with the Blues, predominantly was a right wing forward. Everton were runners up in the First Division in the 1911–12 season and won the championship 1914–15. In total, Chedgzoy made 300 appearances (279 in the league) for Everton. He scored 36 goals, with 33 coming in league games. Chedgzoy also guested for West Ham United during World War One, making 28 appearances and scoring 14 goals.

==== American Soccer League ====
In 1926, Chedgzoy emigrated to the United States where he signed with New Bedford Whalers of the American Soccer League.

==== Canada ====
Chedgzoy gained his first taste of Canada while vacationing there in 1922. In 1924, he spent the English League off season as manager of The Canadian Grenadier Guards, a Canadian armed forces team which competed in the Interprovincial League. When he left the Whalers in 1930, Len Peto, owner of Montréal Carsteel FC hired Chedgzoy as the team's player-coach in the National Soccer League. In his ten years with the club, he took them to seven league finals, losing the first four before winning the 1936, 1939 and 1940 titles. He made his final appearance as a player for Montréal Carsteel FC in the Canadian Club Final in 1939 at the age of fifty. He remained in Montreal until his death on 7 January 1967.

Chedgzoy was inducted into the Canadian Soccer Hall of Fame in 2005.

=== National team ===
Chedgzoy earned his first cap with England in a 2–1 loss to Wales on 15 March 1920. He went on play a total of eight games with England, his last a 3–1 victory over Northern Ireland on 22 October 1924.

== Changing the laws of the game ==
In 1926, he forced a change in the laws of the game when he almost scored by dribbling the ball in from a corner kick. Contrary to popular belief, he hit the side netting and did not score. Prior to 1924 a goal could only be scored from a corner kick if another player made contact with the ball. In that year, the International Football Association Board (IFAB) changed the laws of football so that a goal could be scored directly from a corner kick (without another player touching the ball). However, the wording of the new law was vague. A Liverpool Echo sports journalist, Ernest Edwards, informed the Everton side of the lack of precision in the new rules. During a game against Woolwich Arsenal, Everton gained a corner kick that Chedgzoy took. Instead of crossing the ball in, he dribbled the ball into the penalty area and nearly scored while the other players and referee looked on in shock – and then he successfully persuaded the referee that the rules permitted this way of scoring a goal. After deliberation by the Football Association, it was decided that the goal was legal, and the law was amended making it clear that the player taking the corner could only strike the ball once before another player must make contact. This ensures that corner kicks cannot become corner dribbles, but also permits a goal to be scored direct from a corner.

== Personal life ==
His son, Sydney (1911–1983), was also a footballer who played for various clubs in the 1930s. Chedgzoy served as a private in the Scots Guards during the First World War.
