= 2013 Challenge Trophy =

2013 Canada Soccer National Championships
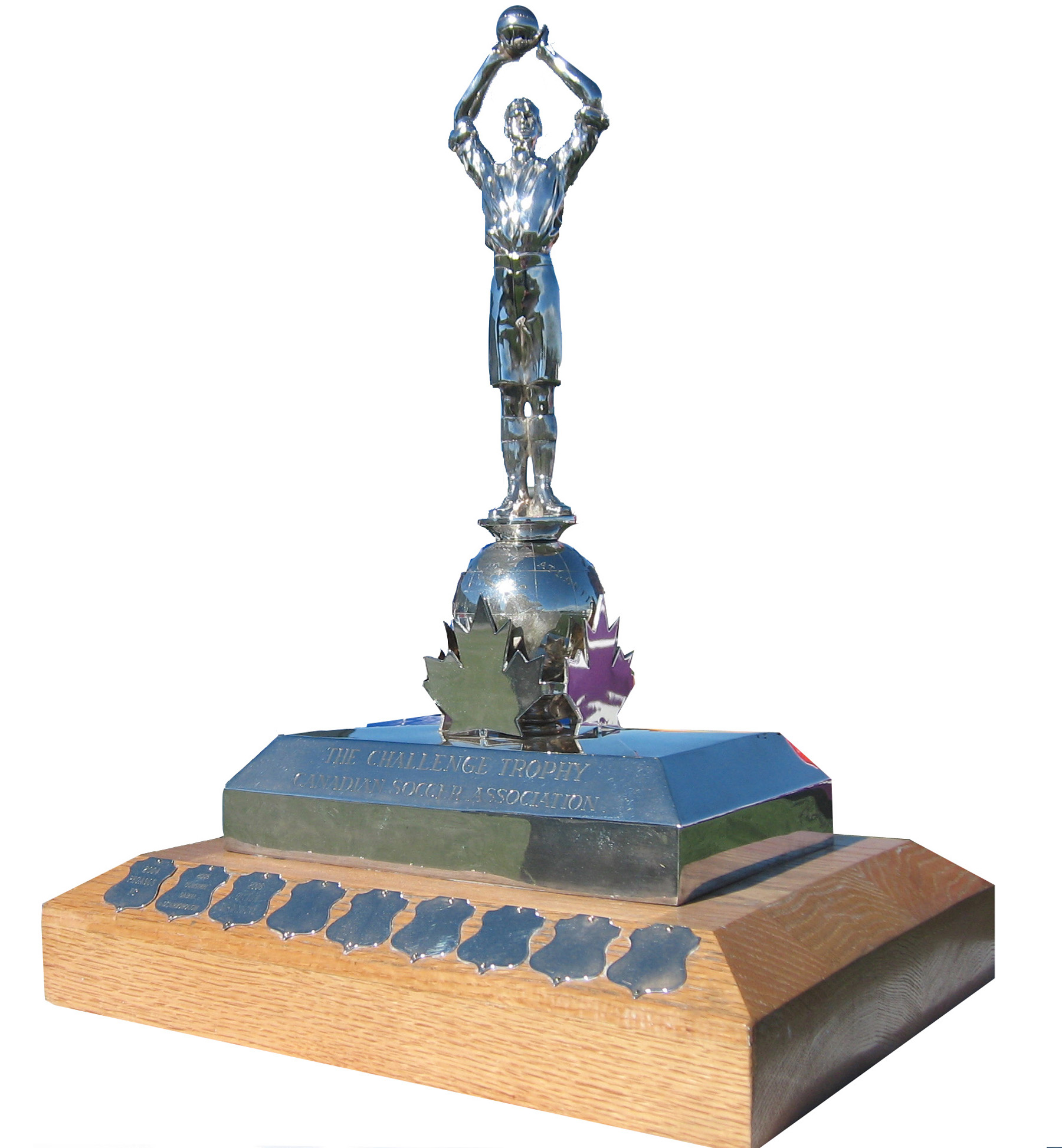
- The Challenge Trophy

Tournament details
- Country: Canada

Final positions
- Champions: Gloucester Celtic FC (1st title)
- Runners-up: Surrey United Firefighters

Awards
- Best player: MVP Tom MacDonald

The 2013 Canada Soccer National Championships (officially the Sport Chek National Championships for sponsorship reasons) was the 91st staging of Canada Soccer's amateur football club competition. Gloucester Celtic FC won the Challenge Trophy after they beat Surrey United Firefighters in the Canadian Final at Mainland Commons in Halifax on 14 October 2013.

Twelve teams qualified to the final week of the 2013 National Championships in Halifax. In the Semifinals, Gloucester Celtic FC beat FC Winnipeg Lions while Surrey United Firefighters beat Saskatoon HUSA Alumni.

On the road to the National Championships, Gloucester Celtic FC beat Caledon SC in the 2013 Ontario Cup Final.

== Teams ==
- (Ontario) Gloucester Celtic FC
- (British Columbia) Surrey United Firefighters
- (Alberta) Edmonton Scottish
- (Manitoba) Winnipeg Lions
- (New Brunswick) Fredericton Wanderers
- (Newfoundland and Labrador) St. Lawrence Laurentians
- (Prince Edward Island) Sherwood-Parkdale Rangers SC
- (Quebec) Royal Select de Beauport (2012 champion)
- (Saskatchewan) HUSA Alumni
- (Northwest Territories) Yellowknife FC
- (Nova Scotia) Halifax City
- (Nova Scotia) Halifax Dunbrack (2)

== Results ==
battle for 11th	St. Lawrence Laurentians (Newfoundland and Labrador)	4-0	(Northwest Territories) Yellowknife FC	Halifax, NS

battle for 9th	Sherwood-Parkdale Rangers SC (Prince Edward Island)	5-0	(New Brunswick) Fredericton Wanderers	Halifax, NS

battle for 7th	Royal Select de Beauport (Quebec)	6-4	(Nova Scotia) Halifax Dunbrack	Halifax, NS

battle for 5th	Edmonton Scottish (Alberta)	2-1	(Nova Scotia) Halifax City	Halifax, NS

bronze medal game	Winnipeg Lions (Manitoba)	2-1	(Saskatchewan) Husa Alumni	Halifax, NS

gold medal game	Gloucester Celtic (Ontario)	3-0	(British Columbia) Surrey United Firefighters	Halifax, NS
	Ryne Gulliver 59' 67'; Alex Walker 62'
