= 2000 Canada Soccer National Championships =

Tournament details
- Country: Canada

Final positions
- Champions: Winnipeg Lucania FC (2nd title)
- Runners-up: Vancouver Westside FC

The 2000 Canada Soccer National Championships was the 78th staging of Canada Soccer's domestic football club competition. Winnipeg Lucania FC won the Challenge Trophy after they beat Vancouver Westside FC in the Canadian Final at Umea Field in Saskatoon on October 9, 2000.

Eleven teams qualified to the final week of the 2000 National Championships in Saskatoon. Each team played group matches before the medal and ranking matches on the last day.

On the road to the National Championships, Winnipeg Lucania FC beat Winnipeg Sons of Italy in the 2000 Manitoba Cup Final.
