= 1975 Canada Soccer National Championships =

Tournament details
- Country: Canada

Final positions
- Champions: Victoria London Boxing AC (1st title)
- Runners-up: St. Lawrence Laurentians

The 1975 Canada Soccer National Championships was the 53rd staging of Canada Soccer's domestic football club competition. Victoria London Boxing AC won the Challenge Trophy after they beat the St. Lawrence Laurentians in the Canadian Final at Mewata Stadium in Calgary on 24 August 1975.

Four teams qualified to the final weekend of the 1975 National Championships in Calgary. In the Semifinals, Victoria London Boxing AC beat Edmonton Ital Canadian SC while St. Lawrence Laurentians beat Kalena St-Simon Montréal.

On the road to the National Championships, Victoria London Boxing AC beat North Shore Paul's Tailor FC in the BC Province Cup and then Winnipeg Thistle FC in the interprovincial playdowns.
