= 1925 Dominion of Canada Football Championship =

Tournament details
- Country: Canada

Final positions
- Champions: Toronto Ulster United FC (1st title)
- Runners-up: Nanaimo City FC

The 1925 Dominion of Canada Football Championship was the 10th staging of Canada Soccer's domestic football club competition. Toronto Ulster United FC won the Challenge Trophy after they beat Nanaimo City FC in a best-of-three series at Carruthers Park in Winnipeg from 25-29 July 1925.

After winning the Ontario section, Toronto Ulster United FC beat Montréal Carsteel FC and Fort William War Veterans on the road to the Canadian Final.
