= Sydney Chedgzoy =

English footballer

Personal information
- Full name: Sydney Chedgzoy
- Date of birth: 17 February 1911
- Place of birth: Liverpool, England
- Date of death: 1983 (aged 71 or 72)
- Place of death: Liverpool, England
- Position: Winger

Senior career*
Years	Team	Apps	(Gls)
1932–1933	Everton	0	(0)
1933–1934	Burnley	5	(1)
1934	Millwall	3	(0)
1934–1938	Runcorn	?	(?)
1938	Sheffield Wednesday	4	(0)
1938–1939	Swansea Town	18	(2)
- * Club domestic league appearances and goals

Sydney Chedgzoy (17 February 1911 – 1983) was an English professional association footballer who played as a winger for a number of Football League and non-league clubs in the 1930s.

He was the son of the Everton and England player, Sam Chedgzoy (1889–1967).
