= 1965 Canada Soccer Football Championship =

Tournament details
- Country: Canada

Final positions
- Champions: Vancouver Firefighters (1st title)
- Runners-up: Oshawa Italia FC

The 1965 Canada Soccer Football Championship was the 43rd staging of Canada Soccer's domestic football club competition. Vancouver Firefighters won the Challenge Trophy after they beat Oshawa Italia FC in the Canadian Final at Kinsmen Civic Memorial Stadium in Oshawa on 25 September 1965.

On the road to the Canadian Final, Vancouver Firefighters FC beat Vancouver Columbus FC in the BC Province Cup, Edmonton Rangers FC in the first round of the interprovincial playdowns, and Winnipeg AN&AF Scottish FC in the Western Final.
