= Doug McMahon =

Canadian soccer player

Personal information
- Full name: Douglas Alexander McMahon
- Date of birth: 16 October 1917
- Place of birth: Winnipeg, Manitoba, Canada
- Date of death: 16 April 1997 (aged 79)
- Height: 1.75 m (5 ft 9 in)
- Position: Forward

Senior career*
Years	Team	Apps	(Gls)
- Winnipeg United Weston FC
1938–1939	Wolverhampton Wanderers F.C.		
1940–1942	Montréal Carsteel FC		
1945–1953	Montréal Carsteel FC / Cancar FC		
1946	→ Chicago Maroons		
1954	Montréal Hakoah FC		
1955–1956	Montréal Nework-Sparta / Sparta FC		
- * Club domestic league appearances and goals

Doug McMahon (16 October 1917 – 16 April 1997) was a Canadian soccer player, who played in the Football League for Wolverhampton Wanderers. He is an honoured member of the Canada Soccer Hall of Fame.

Born in Winnipeg, Manitoba, McMahon signed for Wolves in 1938 and made his debut on 1 January 1939 against Blackpool. He played with them until 1940 and the interruption of play in England due to World War II. During the 1939-40 West Midlands (Regional) League play, McMahon had an impressive nine goals in six games for the Wolves 'A' team, when league play was halted. During the war, McMahon served with Royal Canadian Naval Volunteer Reserves. In England he guested for Chester, scoring six times against Stockport County in December 1939.

In 1946 McMahon played part of the season for the Chicago Maroons in the newly formed North American Soccer Football League. He played for Eastern Canada selects against the Eastern United States in 1947 and 1948 and then Scotland in 1949. In 1948, McMahon won a Canadian championship medal with Montréal Carsteel FC. Across all competitions that year, he scored a local record 71 goals, breaking Eddie MacLaine's old record of 60 goals on 25 September.

== Personal life ==
McMahon's father Sandy was a notable soccer referee in Winnipeg. Brother Bill was also a soccer player.
