= Surrey United =

Surrey United may refer to:

- Surrey United (basketball), an English basketball team
- Surrey United Firefighters, a Canadian soccer team
