= 1999 Canada Soccer National Championships =

Tournament details
- Country: Canada

Final positions
- Champions: Calgary Celtic SFC (1st title)
- Runners-up: Coquitlam Metro-Ford SC

The 1999 Canada Soccer National Championships was the 77th staging of Canada Soccer's domestic football club competition. Calgary Celtic SFC won the Challenge Trophy after they beat Coquitlam Metro-Ford SC in the Canadian Final at Townsend Park in Chilliwack on October 11, 1999.

Celtic SFC were the first Challenge Trophy winners from Calgary in 25 years, with the last title being the Calgary Springer Kickers's in 1974.

Ten teams qualified to the final week of the 1999 National Championships in Chilliwack. Each team played four group matches before the medal and ranking matches on the last day.

On the road to the National Championships, Calgary Celtic SFC beat Calgary Dinosaurs in the 1999 Alberta Cup Final.
