= Art Halliwell =

Canadian soccer player (1897–1964)

Personal information
- Full name: Arthur Jennings Halliwell
- Date of birth: 13 February 1897
- Place of birth: Manchester, England
- Date of death: 18 May 1964 (aged 67)
- Place of death: Toronto, Canada
- Position: Goalkeeper

Senior career*
Years	Team	Apps	(Gls)
1914–1919	Toronto Ulster United FC		
1920	Merchants Shipbuilding F.C.		
1921	Dunfermline Athletic	5	(0)
1926	Toronto Craigavon		
1927–1931	Toronto Scottish		

International career
1925	Canada	2	(0)

Managerial career
- 1925–1930: Toronto Varsity Blues
- * Club domestic league appearances and goals

Art Halliwell (February 13, 1897 – May 18, 1964) was a Canadian soccer player who played as a goalkeeper at the international level with Canada.

== Club career ==
Halliwell was born in England and emigrated to Canada in 1903 along with his parents. In 1914, he played with Toronto Ulster United FC. In 1920, he played abroad in the United States with Merchants Shipbuilding F.C. He played in several friendly matches against the Scottish Football Association's representative teams in 1921. In late 1921, he played in the Scottish Football League Second Division with Dunfermline Athletic where he appeared in five matches.

He represented Ontario in several friendly matches against The Football Association's touring teams and against Corinthian F.C. in 1924, and 1926. In 1926, he played in the Toronto Senior League with Toronto Craigavon. In 1927, played in the National Soccer League with Toronto Scottish. Throughout his tenure with Toronto he assisted in securing the Ontario Cup twice (1928, and 1931) and featured in the Dominion Cup finals against Westminster Royals in 1931.

In 2001, he was inducted into the Canada Soccer Hall of Fame.

== International career ==
Halliwell made his debut for the Canada national team on June 27, 1925, against the United States, and made another appearance against United States on November 8, 1925.

== Managerial career ==
Halliwell served as the head coach in 1925 for the University of Toronto soccer team and secured five championships (1929, 1931, 1932, 1933, and 1935). In 1947, he served as the club president for former club Toronto Ulster United in the National Soccer League.

== Personal life ==
Halliwell died on May 18, 1964, in Toronto, Ontario. A businessman, he became a millionaire through his ownership of gas stations and horse racing.
