= Carlo Alberti =

Canadian soccer player and coach

Carlos Alberti
Personal information
- Date of birth: August 26, 1959 (age 67)

Senior career*
Years	Team	Apps	(Gls)
- Vancouver Columbus FC
1980	Houston Hurricane	1	

International career
1978–1979	Canada U20	8	

Managerial career
- Vancouver Columbus FC
- Ultimate Soccer School
Medal record
Second place	CONCACAF U-20 Tournament	1978
- * Club domestic league appearances and goals

Carlos Alberti (born 26 August 1959) is a Canadian retired soccer player and coach.

== Life ==
Alberti was part of the team representing Canada at the 1978 CONCACAF U-20 Tournament, he earned a silver medal there. He also participated with the Canadian National Youth Team in the FIFA Under 20 World Cup of Soccer in Japan in 1979. He played for the Houston Hurricanes of the NASL.

He currently coaches for Ultimate Soccer School. He is of Italian ancestry.
