= George Graham (soccer, born 1902) =

Irish-Canadian soccer player

Personal information
- Date of birth: April 1, 1902
- Place of birth: Derry, Ireland
- Date of death: August 7, 1966 (aged 64)
- Place of death: Toronto, Ontario, Canada
- Position: Center forward

Senior career*
Years	Team	Apps	(Gls)
- Toronto Ulster United
1925–1926	Philadelphia	10	(8)
1927–1928	Fall River	30	(17)
1928	Brooklyn Wanderers	4	(2)
1928–	Toronto Ulster United FC		

International career
1926	Canada	1	(1)
- * Club domestic league appearances and goals

George Graham (April 1, 1902 – August 7, 1966) was an Irish-Canadian soccer player who earned one cap with the Canadian national team in 1926. He played professionally in both Canada and the United States. In 2017, as part of the "Legends Class" he was elected to the Canada Soccer Hall of Fame as a player.

== Club ==
Born in Ireland, Graham's parents moved to Canada when he was fourteen and settled near Edmonton. Graham worked for the T. Eaton Company and played for the Eaton-sponsored Toronto Ulster United FC. In 1925, Graham joined Philadelphia Field Club of the American Soccer League. In 1927, he moved to the Fall River, playing thirty league games and scoring seventeen goals. Near the end of the season, the 'Marksmen' sent Graham to the Brooklyn Wanderers where he scored another two goals in four games. His combined goals total put him thirteenth on the league's goals table that season. He then returned to Canada where he spent the remainder of his career with Toronto Ulster United. In 1929, Graham scored in the final as Toronto won the Carls-Rite Cup.

== International ==
On November 6, 1926, Graham scored in Canada's 6–2 away loss to the United States.

== Death ==
He died on August 7, 1966, at the Queensway General Hospital.
