= 1985 Canada Soccer National Championships =

Tournament details
- Country: Canada

Final positions
- Champions: Croatia SC Vancouver (1st title)
- Runners-up: Montréal Elio Blues

The 1985 Canada Soccer National Championships was the 63rd staging of Canada Soccer's domestic football club competition. Croatia SC Vancouver won the Challenge Trophy after they beat Montréal Elio Blues in the Canadian Final at Clarke Stadium in Edmonton on 14 October 1985.

Six teams qualified for the final weekend of the 1985 National Championships in Edmonton. Croatia SC Vancouver finished first in their group ahead of Edmonton Ital Canadian SC and Moncton Rovers while Montréal Elio Blues finished first in their group ahead of Winnipeg Ital-Inter SC and Toronto Emerald SC.

On the road to the National Championships, Croatia SC Vancouver beat North Vancouver's Norvan ANAF #45 in the BC Province Cup.
