= Joe Cuzzetto =

Canadian soccer player

Joe Cuzzetto (born March 31, 1960) is a Canadian retired soccer player for Vancouver Columbus FC. As a player, has won 4 Canadian Championships two with Columbus FC in 1978 and Masters in 2003 and two with British Columbia Under 16 and 21 Selects in 1976 and 1981. Cuzzetto represented Canada in the FIFUSA 1985 World Futsal Championship held in Spain while scoring Canada's only goal against Spain. In 1985, as an AllStar representing the Pacific Rim Soccer League, Joe played in the BC Place International Soccer Tournament against Ajax of Amsterdam and Glasgow Celtic. He is a past director with the British Columbia Soccer Association and also recognized and selected to the BC Soccer Roll of Honour. In 2022, Joe has written and published a book The Columbus Football Club - Our Story, the book’s narrative and photographs documenting the clubs’s history and its importance to BC and Canadian soccer. In 2023, Joe was selected as the Confratalanza Club's Italian Canadian of the Year.
