= 1946 Dominion of Canada Football Championship =

Tournament details
- Country: Canada

Final positions
- Champions: Toronto Ulster United FC (2nd title)
- Runners-up: Fort William Army, Navy and Air Force FC

The 1946 Dominion of Canada Football Championship was the 25th staging of the Canada Soccer's domestic football club competition (the first since 1939). Toronto Ulster United FC won the Challenge Trophy after they beat Fort William Army, Navy and Air Force with back-to-back wins in Toronto from 27-29 August 1946.

Only eastern teams competed in 1946. On the road to the Canadian Final, Toronto Ulster United FC beat Toronto Wear-Ever FC in the Ontario section and then beat Montréal Carsteel FC in the Eastern Final.
