= 1991 Canada Soccer National Championships =

Tournament details
- Country: Canada

Final positions
- Champions: Norvan ANAF #45 (1st title)
- Runners-up: Scarborough Azzurri SC

The 1991 Canada Soccer National Championships was the 69th staging of Canada Soccer's domestic football club competition. Norvan ANAF #45 won the Challenge Trophy after they beat Scarborough Azzurri SC in the Canadian Final at Umea Field in Saskatoon on October 14, 1991.

Eight teams qualified to the final week of the 1991 National Championships in Saskatoon which opened with the quarter-finals on October 11. In the semi-finals, Norvan ANAF #45 beat Winnipeg Lucania FC while Scarborough Azzurri SC beat Cole Harbour SC.

On the road to the National Championships, Norvan ANAF #45 beat Vancouver Firefighters in the BC Province Cup Final.
