= 2002 Canada Soccer National Championships =

Tournament details
- Country: Canada

Final positions
- Champions: Winnipeg Sons of Italy (1st title)
- Runners-up: Vancouver Westside FC

The 2002 Canada Soccer National Championships was the 80th staging of Canada Soccer's domestic football club competition. Winnipeg Sons of Italy won the Challenge Trophy after they beat the St. Lawrence Laurentians in the Canadian Final at King George V Park in St. John's on October 14, 2002.

Ten teams qualified to the final week of the 2002 National Championships in St. John's. Each team played four group matches before the medal and ranking matches on the last day.

On the road to the National Championships, Winnipeg Sons of Italy beat Winnipeg Lucania FC in the 2002 Manitoba Cup Final.
