= 1995 Canada Soccer National Championships =

Tournament details
- Country: Canada

Final positions
- Champions: Mistral Estrie (1st title)
- Runners-up: Halifax King of Donair

The 1995 Canada Soccer National Championships was the 73rd staging of Canada Soccer's domestic football club competition. Mistral Estrie won the Challenge Trophy after they beat Halifax King of Donair in the Canadian Final in Winnipeg on 9 October 1995.

Eight teams qualified to the final week of the 1995 National Championships in Winnipeg. Each team played three group matches before the medal and ranking matches on the last day.

On the road to the National Championships, Mistral Estrie beat Racing de Montréal in the 1995 Coupe du Québec Final.
