= 1997 Canada Soccer National Championships =

Tournament details
- Country: Canada

Final positions
- Champions: Edmonton Ital Canadian SC (2nd title)
- Runners-up: North Shore Pegasus

The 1997 Canada Soccer National Championships was the 75th staging of Canada Soccer's domestic football club competition. Edmonton Ital Canadian SC won the Challenge Trophy after they beat North Shore Pegasus in the Canadian Final at the Calgary Soccer Centre in Calgary on 13 October 1997.

Edmonton Ital Canadians SC won 3-1 in the Canadian Final. Vince Reda, Norm Odinga and Sergio Maione scored the Edmonton goals while Troy Wood scored North Shore’s lone goal against Edmonton's teenaged goalkeeper Lars Hirschfeld.

Eight teams qualified to the final week of the 1997 National Championships in Calgary. Each team played three group matches before the medal and ranking matches on the last day.

On the road to the National Championships, Edmonton Ital Canadians SC qualified after they finished in first place at the 1997 Alberta Cup Finals.
