= Leigh Sembaluk =

Canadian soccer player

Personal information
- Date of birth: 2 November 1985 (age 40)
- Place of birth: Regina, Saskatchewan, Canada
- Height: 5 ft 7 in (1.70 m)
- Position: Defender

Youth career
- 2003–2007: Simon Fraser University

Senior career*
Years	Team	Apps	(Gls)
2008	Rochester Rhinos	5	(0)
- * Club domestic league appearances and goals as of September 3, 2008

Leigh Sembaluk (born 2 November 1985) is a Canadian soccer player who played five games for the Rochester Rhinos in the USL First Division in 2008.
