= 1951 Dominion of Canada Football Championship =

Tournament details
- Country: Canada

Final positions
- Champions: Toronto Ulster United FC (3rd title)
- Runners-up: Vancouver St. Andrews FC

The 1951 Dominion of Canada Football Championship was the 30th staging of Canada Soccer's domestic football club competition. Toronto Ulster United FC won the Challenge Trophy after they beat Vancouver St. Andrews FC in a best-of-three series at Westmount Athletic Grounds in Montréal from 15-18 September 1951.

After winning the Ontario section, Toronto Ulster United FC beat Montréal Italia FC in the Eastern Final on the road to the Canadian Final.
