= 2001 Canada Soccer National Championships =

Tournament details
- Country: Canada

Final positions
- Champions: Halifax King of Donair (1st title)
- Runners-up: Victoria Gorge FC

The 2001 Canada Soccer National Championships was the 79th staging of Canada Soccer's domestic football club competition. Halifax King of Donair won the Challenge Trophy after they beat the Victoria Gorge FC in the Canadian Final in Vaughan, Ontario on October 8, 2001. The Halifax team was sponsored by King of Donair.

Ten teams qualified to the final week of the 2000 National Championships in Etobicoke. Each team played four group matches before the medal and ranking matches on the last day.

On the road to the National Championships, Halifax King of Donair beat Halifax Dunbrack in the 2001 Nova Scotia Final.
