= 1976 Canada Soccer National Championships =

Tournament details
- Country: Canada

Final positions
- Champions: Victoria West FC (1st title)
- Runners-up: Winnipeg Fort Rouge

The 1976 Canada Soccer National Championships was the 54th staging of Canada Soccer's domestic football club competition. Victoria West FC won the Challenge Trophy after they beat the Winnipeg Fort Rouge in the Canadian Final at Alexander Park in Winnipeg on August 29, 1976.

Four teams qualified to the final weekend of the 1976 National Championships in Winnipeg. In the semi-finals, Victoria West FC beat St. Lawrence Laurentians while Winnipeg Fort Rouge beat Halifax-Oland SC.

On the road to the National Championships, Victoria West FC beat Vancouver Italia Canadian Paul's Tailor in the BC Province Cup and then Regina Concordia in the interprovincial playdowns.
