= 1978 Canada Soccer National Championships =

Tournament details
- Country: Canada

Final positions
- Champions: Vancouver Columbus FC (4th title)
- Runners-up: Elio Blues de Montréal

Awards
- Best player: MVP Robin Elliott

The 1978 Canada Soccer National Championships was the 56th staging of Canada Soccer's domestic football club competition. Vancouver Columbus FC won the Challenge Trophy after they beat the Montréal Elio Blues in the Canadian Final at Memorial Stadium in Kitchener on September 10, 1978.

Four teams qualified to the final weekend of the 1978 National Championships in Kitchener. In the semi-finals, Vancouver Columbus FC beat St. Lawrence Laurentians, while Montréal Elio Blues beat St. Catharines Roma.

On the road to the National Championships, Vancouver Columbus FC beat Vancouver Eldorado Glens in the BC Province Cup, and then Regina Concordia, Charleswood United and Calgary Springer Kickers in the Western Regional Playoff.
