= 1984 Canada Soccer National Championships =

Tournament details
- Country: Canada

Final positions
- Champions: Victoria West FC (4th title)
- Runners-up: Hamilton Dundas United

The 1984 Canada Soccer National Championships was the 62nd staging of Canada Soccer's domestic football club competition. Victoria West FC won the Challenge Trophy after they beat Hamilton Dundas United in the Canadian Final at Royal Athletic Park on 7 October 1984.

Four teams qualified to the final weekend of the 1984 National Championships in Victoria. In the Semifinals, Victoria West FC beat Edmonton Ital Canadian SC while Hamilton Dundas United beat Halifax Dartmouth United Olands.

On the road to the National Championships, Victoria West FC beat Kamloops Merchants in the BC Province Cup.
