= 1948 Dominion of Canada Football Championship =

Tournament details
- Country: Canada

Final positions
- Champions: Montréal Carsteel FC (1st title)
- Runners-up: Vancouver St. Andrews FC

The 1948 Dominion of Canada Football Championship was the 27th staging of the Canada Soccer's domestic football club competition. Montréal Carsteel FC won the Challenge Trophy for the first time, beating Vancouver St. Andrews FC in a best-of-three final in Toronto from 7-11 August 1948.

On the road to the Canadian Final, Montréal Carsteel FC beat Montréal Stelco FC in the Québec section and then beat Toronto Greenbacks in the Eastern Final at Montréal.
