= 1993 Canada Soccer National Championships =

Tournament details
- Country: Canada

Final positions
- Champions: Vancouver Westside FC (1st title)
- Runners-up: Edmonton Scottish SC

The 1993 Canada Soccer National Championships was the 71st staging of Canada Soccer's domestic football club competition. Vancouver Westside FC won the Challenge Trophy after they beat Calommiers Longueuil in the Canadian Final in Etobicoke on October 11, 1993.

Eight teams qualified to the final week of the 1993 National Championships in Etobicoke. Each team played three group matches before the medal and ranking matches on the last day.

On the road to the National Championships, Vancouver Westside FC beat two-time national champions Norvan ANAF #45 in the 1993 BC Province Cup Final.
