= 1989 Canada Soccer National Championships =

Tournament details
- Country: Canada

Final positions
- Champions: Scarborough Azzurri SC (1st title)
- Runners-up: Holy Cross FC

The 1989 Canada Soccer National Championships was the 67th staging of Canada Soccer's domestic football club competition. Scarborough Azzurri SC won the Challenge Trophy after they beat Holy Cross FC in the Canadian Final at King George V Park in St. John's on 9 October 1989.

Six teams qualified to the final weekend of the 1989 National Championships in St. John's. Scarborough Azzurri SC won their group ahead of Edmonton Ital Canadian SC and Vancouver Westside FC while Holy Cross FC won their group ahead of Winnipeg Lucania FC and Halifax King of Donair.

On the road to the National Championships, Scarborough Azzurri SC beat Hamilton Star in the Ontario Cup Final and then both Hampstead SC and Saskatoon United SC in the Regional Playoff.
