= 1986 Canada Soccer National Championships =

Tournament details
- Country: Canada

Final positions
- Champions: Hamilton Steelers SC (1st title)
- Runners-up: Croatia SC Vancouver

The 1986 Canada Soccer National Championships was the 64th staging of Canada Soccer's domestic football club competition. Croatia SC Vancouver won the Challenge Trophy after they beat Croatia SC Vancouver in the Canadian Final at Rock Forest Park in Sherbrooke on 13 October 1986.

Six teams qualified to the final weekend of the 1986 National Championships in Sherbrooke and Windsor, Quebec. Hamilton Steelers SC won their group ahead of Edmonton Ital Canadian SC and CS Dollard-des-Ormeaux while Croatia SC Vancouver won their group ahead of Charlottetown Olde Dublin Pub and Winnipeg FC Germania.

On the road to the National Championships, Hamilton Steelers SC beat Hamilton Dundas United in the Ontario Cup Final and then Prince Albert Celtic in an interprovincial playoff.
