= 1987 Canadian National Challenge Cup =

1987 Canada Soccer National Championships
Tournament details
- Country: Canada

Final positions
- Champions: Winnipeg Lucania FC (1st title)
- Runners-up: New Westminster QPR

The 1987 Canada Soccer National Championships was the 65th staging of Canada Soccer's domestic football club competition. Winnipeg Lucania FC won the Challenge Trophy after they beat New Westminster Queens Park Rangers in the Canadian Final in Winnipeg on 12 October 1987.

Six teams qualified to the final weekend of the 1987 National Championships in Winnipeg. Winnipeg Lucania FC won their group ahead of Dartmouth United SC Moosehead and Scarborough Azzurri SC while New Westminster QPR won their group ahead of Edmonton Scottish SC and CS Hermès Montréal.

On the road to the National Championships, Winnipeg Lucania FC beat Winnipeg Micalense in the Manitoba Cup Final.

== Results ==
12-Oct-1987 Final	Winnipeg Lucania FC	1-0	New Westminster Q.P.R.	Winnipeg, Manitoba
	Kevin Methot	Summary Report

== Team rosters ==
=== Winnipeg Lucania FC ===
- Winnipeg: (Squad): Steve Hooper, Chris Harris, Rob Albo, Rob Watson, Keith Ferbers, Mark Edwards, Doug

Reimer, Venni Sartor, Alex Bustos, John Baillie, Kevin Methot, Dave Dulko, Abe Rempel, Bill Elzard, Kevin Antonio, Marno Olafson.

=== New Westminster Q.P.R. ===
- New Westminster: (Squad): Brad Higgs, Garry Ayre, Carl Shearer, Mike Sephton, Peter Stanley, Jim Roberts,

Jim Easton, Dave Harkison, Lindsay Henderson, Dave Porter, Frank Fiddler, Steve Brown, Kevin Moye, John Michalec, Stewart Easton, Rick Gomboc.
