= 1974 Canada Soccer National Championships =

Tournament details
- Country: Canada

Final positions
- Champions: Calgary Springer Kickers (1st title)
- Runners-up: Windsor SS Italia

The 1974 Canada Soccer National Championships was the 52nd staging of Canada Soccer's domestic football club competition. Calgary Springer Kickers won the Challenge Trophy after they beat Windsor SS Italia in the Canadian Final at King George V Park in St. John's on 25 August 1974.

Four teams qualified to the final weekend of the 1974 National Championships in St. John's. In the Semifinals, Calgary Springer Kickers beat AS Haïtiana Montréal and Windsor SS Italia beat Grand Bank GeeBees.

On the road to the National Championships, Calgary Springer Kickers beat Edmonton Scottish SC in the Alberta Cup Final and then Vancouver Lobban's FC in the interprovincial playdowns.
