= 1969 Canada Soccer Football Championship =

Tournament details
- Country: Canada

Final positions
- Champions: Vancouver Columbus FC (2nd title)
- Runners-up: SA Ukraina Montréal

The 1969 Canada Soccer Football Championship was the 47th staging of Canada Soccer's domestic football club competition. Vancouver Columbus FC won the Challenge Trophy after they beat SA Ukraina Montréal in the Canadian Final at Swangard Stadium in Burnaby on 28 September 1969.

On the road to the Canadian Final, Vancouver Columbus FC beat Vancouver Glenavon in the BC Province Cup Final, Calgary Shamrocks in the first round of the interprovincial playdowns, and Regina Concordia in the Western Final.
