= 1964 Canada Soccer Football Championship =

Tournament details
- Country: Canada

Final positions
- Champions: Vancouver Columbus FC (1st title)
- Runners-up: Sudbury Italia FC

The 1964 Canada Soccer Football Championship was the 42nd staging of Canada Soccer's domestic football club competition. Vancouver Columbus FC won the Challenge Trophy after they beat Sudbury Italia FC in the Canadian Final at Callister Park in Vancouver on 19 September 1964.

On the road to the Canadian Final, Vancouver Columbus FC beat Vancouver Firefighters in the BC Province Cup, Edmonton Italia Canadians in the first round of the interprovincial playdowns, and Regina Concordia in the Western Final.

Sudbury Italia FC beat Windsor Teutonia in the Ontario Cup, Halifax-Oland SC in the first round of the interprovincial playdowns, and Montréal Saint-Paul Rovers in the Eastern Final before they lost to Vancouver in the Canadian Final.
