= 1990 Canada Soccer National Championships =

Tournament details
- Country: Canada

Final positions
- Champions: Vancouver Firefighters (4th title)
- Runners-up: Dartmouth United Moosehead

The 1990 Canada Soccer National Championships was the 68th staging of Canada Soccer's domestic football club competition. Vancouver Firefighters won the Challenge Trophy after they beat Dartmouth United SC Moosehead in the Canadian Final at Beazley Field in Dartmouth on October 8, 1990.

Six teams qualified to the final weekend of the 1990 National Championships in Dartmouth, Nova Scotia. Vancouver Firefighters FC won their group ahead of Windsor Giovanni Caboto Club and Saint John Bicentennial Moosehead while Dartmouth United SC Moosehead won their group ahead of Winnipeg Italia SC and Burin Eagles.

On the road to the National Championships, Vancouver Firefighters FC beat New Westminster QPR in the BC Province Cup Final and then both Saskatoon United and Edmonton Italia Canadians in the Western Regional Playoff.
