= 1998 Canada Soccer National Championships =

Tournament details
- Country: Canada

Final positions
- Champions: CS Rivière-des-Prairies (1st title)
- Runners-up: Hamilton Serbians SC

The 1998 Canada Soccer National Championships was the 76th staging of Canada Soccer's domestic football club competition. CS Rivière-des-Prairies won the Challenge Trophy after they beat Hamilton Serbians SC in the Canadian Final at Chapman Field in Fredericton on 12 October 1998.

Eight teams qualified to the final week of the 1998 National Championships in Fredericton. Each team played three group matches before the medal and ranking matches on the last day.

On the road to the National Championships, CS Rivière-des-Prairies qualified after they finished in first place at the 1998 Coupe du Québec Finals.
