= 1996 Canada Soccer National Championships =

Tournament details
- Country: Canada

Final positions
- Champions: Vancouver Westside FC (2nd title)
- Runners-up: Cosmos LaSalle

Awards
- Best player: John Catliff

The 1996 Canada Soccer National Championships was the 74th staging of Canada Soccer's domestic football club competition. Vancouver Westside FC won the Challenge Trophy after they beat Cosmos LaSalle in the Canadian Final at Lockhart Ryan Memorial Park in New Minas on October 14, 1996.

John Catliff, who scored twice in the Canadian Final, was named the Most Valuable Player of the tournament, leading the tournament with six goals in four matches.

Eight teams qualified to the final week of the 1996 National Championships in New Minas. Each team played three group matches before the medal and ranking matches on the last day.

On the road to the National Championships, Vancouver Westside FC beat North Shore Pegasus in the 1996 BC Province Cup Final.
