= Tony Nocita =

Canadian soccer player

Personal information
- Full name: Antonio Nocita
- Date of birth: November 9, 1963 (age 62)
- Place of birth: Winnipeg, Manitoba, Canada
- Position: Defender

Team information
- Current team: Sons of Italy Lions SC
- Number: 5

Senior career*
Years	Team	Apps	(Gls)
1987–1990	Winnipeg Fury	95	(9)
1991	Hamilton Steelers	28	(1)
1992-1993	Winnipeg Fury	20+	(3+)
1994	Toronto Rockets		
2002–?	Sons of Italy Lions SC	180	(9)

International career^{‡}
1987–1992	Canada	8	(0)
- * Club domestic league appearances and goals as of 23 September 2009 ‡ National team caps and goals as of 23 September 2009

Tony Nocita (born 9 November 1963) is a former professional Canadian soccer player who currently coaches the FC Winnipeg Lions.

He has been inducted into the Manitoba Sports Hall of Fame in 2003. The Winnipeg Fury's 1992 Mita Cup winning team will be inducted into the Manitoba Sports Hall of Fame in 2008.

== Club career ==
Nocita played for the Winnipeg Fury of the Canadian Soccer League beginning in 1987, and was a member of the 1992 Championship team. He served as the team captain for the Fury in 1993 during the team's run in the Canadian National Soccer League. In 1994, he played in the American Professional Soccer League with the Toronto Rockets.

== International career ==
Nicknamed Chita, he made his debut for Canada in an October 1987 friendly match against Honduras. He went on to earn 8 caps, all friendlies, scoring no goals.

His final international was an April 1992 game against China.

== Coaching career ==
He has coached FC Winnipeg Lions for several years as well as Calgary Storm.

== Honours ==
- Canadian Soccer League: 1

1992
