= 1972 Canada Soccer National Championships =

Tournament details
- Country: Canada

Final positions
- Champions: New Westminster Blues SC (9th title)
- Runners-up: Toronto San Fili SC

Awards
- Best player: MVP Mike Gilmore

The 1972 Canada Soccer National Championships was the 50th staging of Canada Soccer's domestic football club competition. New Westminster Blues SC won the Challenge Trophy after they beat Toronto San Fili SC in the Canadian Final at Empire Field in Vancouver on 1 October 1972.

On the road to the Canadian Final, Westminster Blues SC beat Norburn in the BC Province Cup Final, Edmonton Scottish SC in the interprovincial playdowns, and Winnipeg Thistle FC in the Western Final.
