= Yellowknife FC =

Yellowknife FC (Senior Men)
- Ground: Range Lake; Yellowknife, Northwest Territories
- Manager: Isaac Ayiku
- Website: http://www.nwtkicks.ca/club-teams/yellowknife-fc/senior-mens
Home colours

Yellowknife FC (Senior Women)
- Ground: Range Lake; Yellowknife, Canada
- Manager: Ryan Fequet
- Website: http://www.nwtkicks.ca/club-teams/yellowknife-fc/senior-womens
Home colours

Yellowknife FC is a football (soccer) club from Yellowknife, Northwest Territories, of Canada. The club sends a senior men's and senior women's team to represent the Northwest Territories at the Challenge Trophy and the Jubilee Trophy respectively. The Yellowknife FC Senior men's squad made their first appearance at the finals in 2011. The senior women entered in 2012. Every year the teams compete for a top-eight spot in the 12-team competition for men and the 10-team competition for women. Such a finish would give the Northwest Territories a better seeding the following year.

== History ==
=== 2013 ===
The squads prepared for the National Club Championships in Halifax, Nova Scotia 2013. The men were featured in group B which also includes the champions from Alberta and Nova Scotia. The women were in group A featuring the champions from Ontario, Quebec, Nova Scotia and Newfoundland. It was announced after the last year's finals that Isaac Ayiku would retire as a player and would take over from Mark LeDrew as manager of the senior men. Ryan Fequet remains at the helm of the senior women's squad.

=== 2012 ===
For the first time, the Northwest Territories sent a women's squad to the Canadian Soccer Association National Championships Jubilee Trophy competition. Ryan Fequet became the first head coach of the Yellowknife FC Women's Senior squad. Fequet is also President of Northwest Territories Soccer Association and sits on the board of directors at the Canadian Soccer Association. The senior men and women traveled to Winnipeg, MB in early October to participate in the competition. Matthew Jason returned to the senior men's starting lineup and the injured Mark LeDrew (center back) took over as head coach. LeDrew hopes to again be at the heart of the defense for the National Club Championships in Halifax, Nova Scotia.

=== 2011 ===
For the first time, the Northwest Territories sent a men's squad, represented by Yellowknife FC, to the National Championships Challenge Trophy competition in Brossard, QC. The select team featured players from several clubs in the territory. Matthew Jason, a regular in the starting eleven, sustained a potential career ending knee injury and became head coach of the Senior Men's Squad. Jason created Yellowknife FC.

== Coaching staff ==
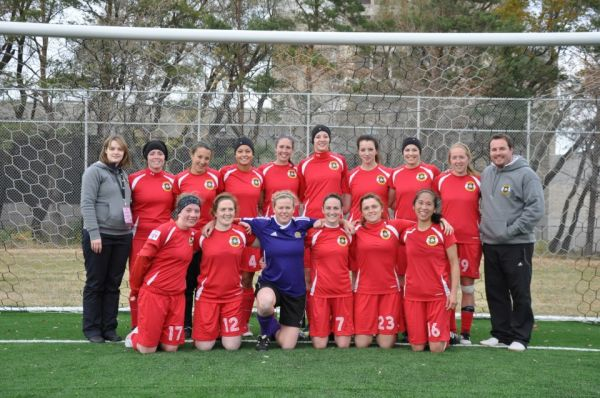
Senior Women Team

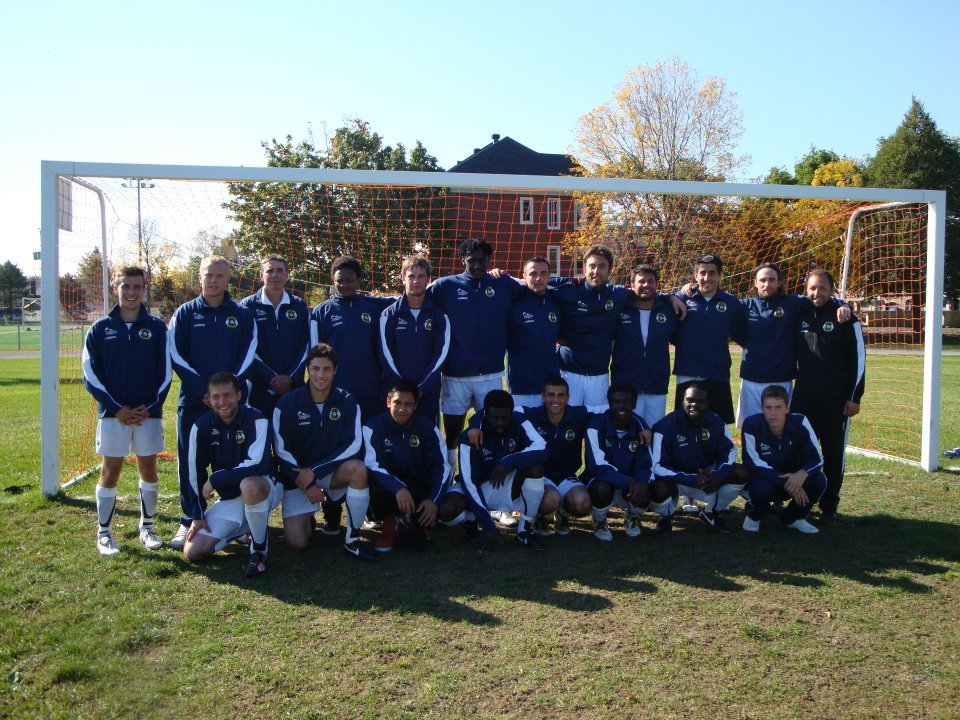

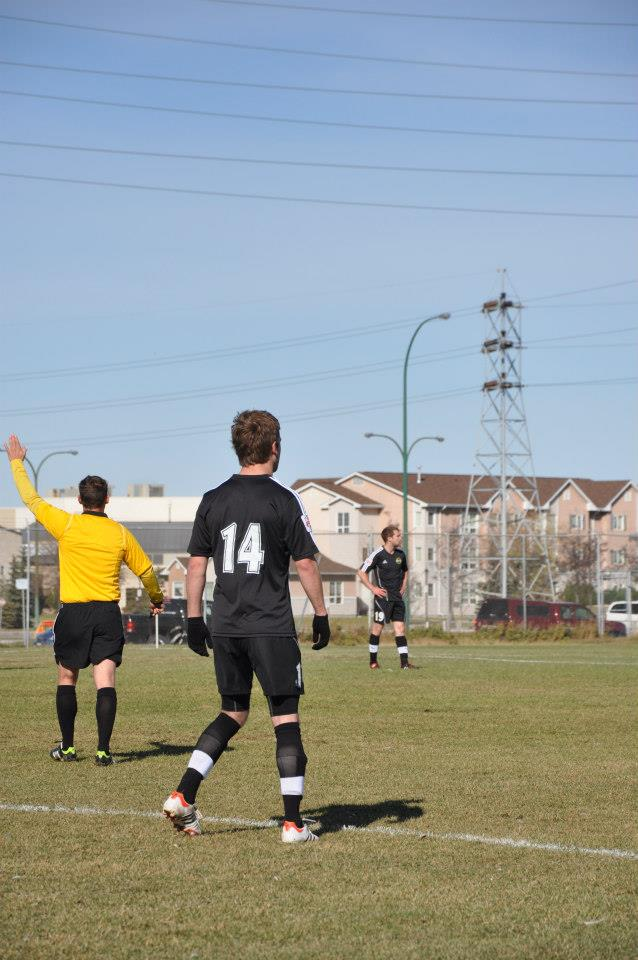
Game against the champions from Winnipeg

Isaac Ayiku enters his first year as head coach for the senior men. Ryan Fequet returns for his second year as the head coach of the senior women.

== Domestic competitions ==
Yellowknife FC is the only competitive team in NT. In order to stay fit and prepare for the Canadian Challenge Cup and Jubilee Trophy, players compete on various teams in the Yellowknife Adult Soccer League.

== Challenge Trophy/ Jubilee Trophy Club Championship ==
=== Location ===
Halifax, Nova Scotia

==== Date ====
14 October 2013

=== National Seeding ===
| Seeding (Men) | Province | Seeding (Women) | Province |
|---|---|---|---|
| 1 | Quebec | 1 | Ontario |
| 2 | Alberta | 2 | British Columbia |
| 3 | Saskatchewan | 3 | Saskatchewan |
| 4 | Prince Edward Island | 4 | Quebec |
| 5 | British Columbia | 5 | Nova Scotia |
| 6 | Ontario | 6 | Manitoba |
| 7 | Nova Scotia | 7 | Alberta |
| 8 | Newfoundland Labrador | 8 | Newfoundland Labrador |
| 9 | Manitoba | 9 | Northwest Territories |
| 10 | New Brunswick | 10 | Prince Edward Island |
| 11 | Northwest Territories | N/A | N/A |
| 12 | Nova Scotia (2) Guest team | N/A | N/A |

Last updated: 1 July 2013
