= 1981 Canada Soccer National Championships =

Tournament details
- Country: Canada

Final positions
- Champions: North York Ciociaro (1st title)
- Runners-up: Calgary Springer Kickers

The 1981 Canada Soccer National Championships was the 59th staging of Canada Soccer's domestic football club competition. North York Ciociaro SC won the Challenge Trophy after they beat the Calgary Springer Kickers in the Canadian Final at Glenmore Park in Calgary on October 11, 1981.

Four teams qualified to the final weekend of the 1981 National Championships in Calgary. In the semi-finals, North York Ciociaro SC beat Holy Cross FC, while hosts Calgary Springer Kickers beat Victoria West FC.

On the road to the 1981 National Championships, North York Ciociaro SC beat Hamilton Dundas United in the 1980 Ontario Cup and then CS Hermès Montréal in the 1981 Central Regional Playoff.
