= 1982 Canada Soccer National Championships =

Tournament details
- Country: Canada

Final positions
- Champions: Victoria West FC (3rd title)
- Runners-up: Saskatoon United

The 1982 Canada Soccer National Championships was the 60th staging of Canada Soccer's domestic football club competition. Victoria West FC won the Challenge Trophy after they beat Saskatoon United in the Canadian Final at Glenmore Park in Calgary on 11 October 1982.

Four teams qualified to the final weekend of the 1982 National Championships in Saskatoon. In the Semifinals, Victoria West FC beat Kitchener Olympics while hosts Saskatoon United beat hosts Dartmouth United Olands.

On the road to the National Championships, Victoria West FC beat Croatia SC Vancouver in the BC Province Cup and then Calgary Springer Kickers and Winnipeg Tatra SC in the Western Regional Playoff.
