= 1979 Canada Soccer National Championships =

Tournament details
- Country: Canada

Final positions
- Champions: Victoria West FC (2nd title)
- Runners-up: LaSalle Olympique SC

The 1979 Canada Soccer National Championships was the 57th staging of Canada Soccer's domestic football club competition. Victoria West FC won the Challenge Trophy after they beat the LaSalle Olympique SC in the Canadian Final at Royal Athletic Park in Victoria on 16 September 1979.

Four teams qualified to the final weekend of the 1979 National Championships in Victoria. In the Semifinals, Victoria West FC beat Winnipeg Tatra SC while LaSalle Olympique SC beat Holy Cross FC.

On the road to the National Championships, Victoria West FC beat Vancouver Croatia in the BC Province Cup.
