= 1992 Canada Soccer National Championships =

Tournament details
- Country: Canada

Final positions
- Champions: Norvan ANAF #45 (2nd title)
- Runners-up: Edmonton Scottish SC

The 1992 Canada Soccer National Championships was the 70th staging of Canada Soccer's domestic football club competition. Norvan ANAF #45 won the Challenge Trophy after they beat Edmonton Scottish SC in the Canadian Final at Swangard Stadium in Burnaby on October 12, 1992.

Steve Millar scored the winning goal in the amateur Canadian Final just eight days after he scored the series winner for the Winnipeg Fury in the Canadian Soccer League Final.

Eight teams qualified to the final week of the 1992 National Championships in Burnaby which opened with the quarter-finals on October 9. In the semi-finals, Norvan ANAF #45 beat Halifax King of Donair while Edmonton Scottish SC beat West Island Lakers.

On the road to the National Championships, Norvan ANAF #45 beat Simon Fraser Clan Alumni in the 1992 BC Province Cup Final.
