= 1973 Canada Soccer National Championships =

Tournament details
- Country: Canada

Final positions
- Champions: Vancouver Firefighters (1st title)
- Runners-up: West Indies United Toronto

Awards
- Best player: MVP John Haar

The 1973 Canada Soccer National Championships was the 51st staging of Canada Soccer's domestic football club competition. Vancouver Firefighters won the Challenge Trophy after they beat West Indies United Toronto in the Canadian Final at King George V Park in St. John's on 3 September 1973.

Six teams qualified to the final weekend of the 1973 National Championships in St. John's. In the Semifinals, Vancouver Firefighters beat St-Viateur Montréal while West Indies United Toronto beat Holy Cross FC. West Indies United Toronto were the first team of colour to reach the Canadian Final.

On the road to the National Championships, Vancouver Firefighters FC beat New Westminster Blues SC in the BC Province Cup Final and then the Yukon Canucks in the interprovincial playdowns. Vancouver then beat the Saint John Schooners in their opening match at the National Championships.
