= 1983 Canada Soccer National Championships =

Tournament details
- Country: Canada

Final positions
- Champions: Vancouver Firefighters (3rd title)
- Runners-up: CNSC Windsor Croatia

The 1983 Canada Soccer National Championships was the 61st staging of Canada Soccer's domestic football club competition. Vancouver Firefighters won the Challenge Trophy after they beat CNSC Windsor Croatia in the Canadian Final at Fort William Stadium in Thunder Bay on October 10, 1983.

Four teams qualified to the final weekend of the 1983 National Championships in Thunder Bay. In the semi-finals, Vancouver Firefighters FC beat Montréal Elio Blues, while CNSC Windsor Croatia beat Halifax King of Donair.

On the road to the National Championships, Vancouver Firefighters FC beat Victoria Vikings in the BC Province Cup and then both Lethbridge Royals and Regina Concordia in the Western Regional Playoff.
