= Toronto Ulster United FC =

Canadian former soccer club

- Full name: Toronto Ulster United FC
- Nickname: Redhanders
- Stadium: Ulster Stadium

Toronto Ulster United FC was a Canadian soccer club based in Toronto, Ontario. They were three-time Dominion of Canada Football Championships winners, lifting the Connaught Cup in 1925 and then the Challenge Trophy in 1946 and 1951. They were recognized by the Canada Soccer Hall of Fame as an Organisation of Distinction.

Toronto Ulster United FC were established in November 1913. In the 1920s, club president Bill Pentland invested $94,000 towards the building of Ulster Stadium, a soccer-specific stadium near Greenwood and Gerrard avenues.

Over the course of their history, they played in several leagues and competitions and were at times either a professional or amateur club. Their last major season was 1962 before they withdrew from the National League playoffs due to financial issues.

Wrote Winnipeg sports journalist Vince Leah in 1943, "you can name the famous Canadian soccer teams on one hand... Westminster Royals, Toronto Ulster, Montréal Carsteel and United Weston."

== Season-by-season record ==
Toronto Ulster United FC season-by-season record after they left the National League Ontario (National League Ontario-Québec) just before the 1942 season. They played three seasons in the Toronto & District League and five seasons in the Ontario Major Soccer League (they rejoined the National League in 1947, but then rejoined the Ontario Major League before the end of the year). Note: MP = Matches played, W = Wins, D = Draws, L = Losses, Pts = Points, GF = Goals for, GA = Goals against

Season & League	MP	W	D	L	Pts	Season	Playoffs	City / Consols	Canada
1942 TDFA	13	10	2	1	22	1st in TDFA	Won TDFA Championship; Won Inter-City Halliwell Cup	Advanced, but series postponed until 1943	n/a
1943 TDFA	18	11	7	0	29	1st in TDFA	Won TDFA Championship; Won Inter-City Halliwell Cup	Won 1942 City Cup; Won 1943 City Cup	n/a
1944 TDFA	17	11	2	4	24	2nd in TDFA	Lost Quarterfinals	Lost City 1st Round	n/a
1945 OMSL	20	8	7	5	23	2nd in OMSL	Lost Final	Lost 2nd Round	n/a
1946 OMSL	14	12	2	0	26	1st, won Pickavat Trophy	Won Playoff Final	Won City's Consols Trophy	Won DCFA Ontario Final; Won Challenge Trophy
1947 NSL ON/QC	16	8	6	2	22	3rd in NSL-ON/QC	-	Lost City Semifinals	Won DCFA Ontario Final; Dismissed from DCFA 2nd Round
1947 OMSL	2	0	0	2	0	-	Won Playoff Final	-	-
1948 OMSL	24	7	6	11	20	4th in OMSL	Lost Semifinals	Lost City Semifinals	Lost DCFA Ontario Semifinals
Season & League	MP	W	D	L	Pts	Season	Playoffs	City (Consols); Province	Canada
1949 OMSL	20	17	2	1	36	1st, won Pickavat Trophy	Lost Final	Lost City 2nd Round; Lost Ontario Cup 1st Round	Lost DCFA Ontario Quarterinals

Toronto Ulster United FC season-by-season record after they rejoined the National League Ontario (National League Ontario-Québec) in 1950. Note: MP = Matches played, W = Wins, D = Draws, L = Losses, Pts = Points, GF = Goals for, GA = Goals against

Season	MP	W	D	L	Pts	Finish	NSL Playoffs	City (Consols Cup)	Canada
1950	14	8	1	5	17	4th in NSL-ON	Missed playoffs	Lost City Semifinals	Did not enter
1950 Frame	4	3	0	1	6	1st in Group	Won Frame Cup	-	-
1950 Glebe	4	2	2	0	6	?	-	-	-
1951	24	16	3	5	35	2nd in NSL-ON	Missed playoffs	Lost City Semifinals	Won Ontario section, won 1951 Challenge Trophy
1952	18	7	6	5	20	6th in NSL-ON	No playoffs	Lost City Quarterfinals	Did not enter
1952 Walker	9	6	1	2	13	1st in series	Lost Final	-	-
1953	16	9	4	3	22	2nd in NSL-ON	No playoffs	Eliminated 3rd Round	Did not enter
1953 Arnold Cup	7	5	1	1	11	3rd in series	Missed playoffs	-	-
1954	20	11	5	4	27	2nd in NSL-ON/QC	No playoffs	Did not enter	Did not enter
1954 Arnold Cup	8	6	1	1	13	1st in Group	Won Arnold Cup Final (best of three)	-	-
1955	18	10	4	4	24	3rd in NSL-ON	Won Playoff Final (Carling Trophy)	Won Final (Consols Trophy)	Won Ontario section, lost Eastern Final
1955 Arnold Cup	6	3	1	2	7	5th in series	-	-	-
Season	MP	W	D	L	Pts	Finish	NSL Playoffs	Province (Ontario Cup)	Canada
1956	24	16	1	7	33	3rd in NSL-ON	Lost semifinals	Did not enter	Did not enter
1957	27	11	6	10	28	5th in NSL-ON	Missed playoffs	Did not enter	Did not enter
1958	28	9	4	15	22	10th in NSL-ON/QC	Missed playoffs	Did not enter	Did not enter
1959	26	8	3	15	19	12th in NSL-ON/QC	Missed playoffs	Did not enter	Lost in NSL section
1960	24	5	2	17	12	12th in NSL-ON/QC	Missed playoffs	Did not enter	Did not enter
1961	24	2	3	19	7	7th in NSL-ON/QC (last)	Missed playoffs	Did not enter	Lost in NSL section
1962	22	12	3	7	27	4th in NSL-ON	Lost in semifinals group	Did not enter	No competition

== Honours ==
National
Competitions	Titles	Seasons
Dominion of Canada Football Championship	3	1925, 1946, 1951
National League Championship for the Atholstan Trophy	5	1926('27), 1932, 1933('34), 1934('35), 1941
International League for the Nathan Strauss Cup	1	1926
Ontario section winners for the Dominion Championship	11	1922, 1923, 1925, 1928, 1937, 1938, 1939, 1946, 1947, 1951, 1955
Ontario Cup (provincial championship)	3	1927, 1929, 1937
British Consols Trophy (city championship)	10	1925, 1927, 1928, 1929, 1930, 1931, 1937, 1938, 1946, 1955
National City League	1	1940
Toronto & District Football League	2	1942, 1943
Ontario Major League	2	1946, 1949
Ontario Major League Playoffs	2	1946, 1947
NSL Frame Series	1	1950
NSL Arnold Cup	1	1954
NSL Playoffs for the Carling Trophy	1	1955

== Notable former players ==
Eight former Toronto Ulster United FC players have been inducted into the Canada Soccer Hall of Fame as honoured players.

- (Canada) Joe Clulow
- (Canada) Fred Dierden
- (Canada) George Graham
- (Canada) Art Halliwell
- (Canada) Bobby Lavery
- (Canada) Jimmy Moir
- (Canada) Andy Stevens
- (Canada) Dave Turner
