= 1994 Canada Soccer National Championships =

Tournament details
- Country: Canada

Final positions
- Champions: Edmonton Ital Canadian SC (1st title)
- Runners-up: Scarborough Azzurri SC

The 1994 Canada Soccer National Championships was the 72nd staging of Canada Soccer's domestic football club competition. Edmonton Ital Canadian SC won the Challenge Trophy after they beat Scarborough Azzurri SC in the Canadian Final at Victoria Soccer Club in Edmonton on 10 October 1994.

Eight teams qualified to the final week of the 1994 National Championships in Edmonton. Each team played three group matches before the medal and ranking matches on the last day.

On the road to the National Championships, Edmonton Ital Canadians SC beat Edmonton Scottish SC in the 1994 Alberta Cup Final.
