= ICSF Columbus FC =

Columbus FC
- Full name: Columbus FC
- Founded: 1953; 73 years ago
- League: VMSL Premier
- 2022–23: VMSL Division Premier League
- Website: http://www.columbusfc.ca/
Home colours	Away colours

Columbus FC is a Canadian soccer club based in Vancouver, British Columbia currently playing in the Premier division of the Vancouver Metro Soccer League. In 2013, the club was recognized as a Canada Soccer Hall of Fame Organization of Distinction.

== History ==
Father Della Torre was instrumental in starting the team in 1953 as Sacred Heart soccer team, with the goal of providing a team for the many Italian immigrants who settled in the east side of Vancouver.

By 1957, the team name changed to Columbus and was under the guidance of Peter Mainardi. As president, Mainairdi gave the club stability and strong leadership and paved the way for Columbus' future successes. After joining the Pacific Coast League in 1959–60, they became one of the league's most popular and successful teams of the 1960s. After winning their first national title in 1964, they won back-to-back Pacific Coast League playoff titles in 1965 and 1966 and then finally their first Pacific Coast League championship in 1968–69. In that 1968–69 season, they won the league, the playoffs, BC Soccer's Province Cup, and Canada Soccer's Challenge Trophy.

Their domination on the field captured the imagination of the Italian soccer community in particular. The team played at Callister Park in Vancouver at that time.

In all, Columbus FC played 12 seasons in the Pacific Coast League from 1959–60 to 1970–71, winning three championships (1968–69, 1969–70, 1970–71) and four playoff titles (1965, 1966, 1969, 1970). In 1972, they joined the newly formed British Columbia Premier League and won both the league and playoff title.

In 1973, for having played in an unsanctioned tournament, the club and its owner Peter Mainardi were suspended. Therefore, for a few years the same players played under the Vancouver Italia name until coming back with the Columbus name in 1975.

Following the death of Mainairdi, the club came under the guidance of Paul Anthony who had joined the team as a player in 1954.

Anthony continued on as secretary and team manager and played a key role in the evolution of the club until his death in 1982. From 1982 to 1987, the administration of the club was under the leadership of Eugenio Vazzoler, Peter Greco and General manager Charlie Cuzzetto.

In 1985, Columbus entered the newly formed semi-professional Pacific Rim Soccer League with Joe Tinucci as president and Mike Bernardis as coach. Columbus as a semi-professional club, quickly became cup champions as well as national finalists with Toronto Blizzard.

After an absence of 10 years Columbus re-emerged in 2003 under the direction of Rob Mascitti, Carmen D'Onofrio and Joe Papa. Although the passing of years has seen the influx of non -Italian players, the major part of the team still hold fast to its Italian roots, a tribute to past Coaches Gianni Azzi, Jack Hobbs 1964 (Canadian Champions) Joe Csabai 1969 (Canadian Champions), Tony Canta 1977, 1978 (Canadian Champions).

Columbus has been at the forefront of Canadian soccer and has planted deep soccer roots in Canada over the past 70 years. The team has provided more players than any other amateur club in Canada to Canada's Professional, Provincial, Olympic and National Team rosters as well as supplying Universities and Colleges. Columbus also holds the distinction of having the most players in the Canadian Soccer Hall of Fame with eleven players. After the Westminster Royals, Columbus is the most successful amateur club in Canada having appeared in six National Finals and winning four. Columbus also holds the record for the largest margin of victory in a Canadian championship final game a 10–0 score against Montreal Ukraine in 1969.

The Columbus family of teams include the men's open premier team, Division 2 team, women's Division 2 team, over 35s, over 45s (Premier and Division 1), over 50s, over 55s and over 60s. As of 2015, the Columbus family of teams are now associated with the Italian Canadian Sports Federation, which also includes boys and girls teams from five-year-olds to adults.

Several figures linked to the Columbus Alumni have held influential roles across Canadian and international football. Victor Montagliani rose to the presidencies of CONCACAF and the Canadian Soccer Association and became a FIFA vice president. Charlie and Joe Cuzzetto, along with Frank Ciaccia, earned senior administrative posts and places on the BC Soccer Roll of Honour. Various others, including Danny and Sam Lenarduzzi, Frank Iuele, and Michael Findlay, have shaped youth development, technical programmes, and national team coaching across Canada. In addition to winning numerous league championships, Kennedy Cups, Imperial Cups and Provincial Cups, Columbus has won the Challenge Trophy four times: 1964, 1969, 1977 and 1978 and were finalists in 1968 and 2007.

In addition, Columbus Masters Over 35s also won a National Championship in 2003 and Western Championship in 2009 and 2013. The Over 40s have won two league and one cup championships. Since 2003, Columbus has played in the VMSL and have won a Provincial Cup, two Imperial Cups, two Western Canadian Championships and one Provincial Cup Finalist and one Canadian National Trophy Cup Finalist.

== Season-by-season record ==
Vancouver Columbus FC season-by-season record in the Pacific Coast League. Note: MP = Matches played, W = Wins, D = Draws, L = Losses, Pts = Points, GF = Goals for, GA = Goals against

Season	MP	W	D	L	Pts	GF	GA	Finish	Playoffs	Province	Canada
1959-60	19	11	1	7	23	51	40	2nd in PCSL	Lost playoff final		
1960-61	16	5	5	6	15	34	37	3rd in PCSL	No playoffs	Lost provincial semifinals	
1961-62	25	15	4	6	34	59	45	2nd in PCSL	Lost playoff final		
1962-63	21	10	4	7	24	46	40	4th in PCSL	Lost Final, 0–1 Firefighters	Lost provincial semifinals	
1963-64	21	14	5	2	33	60	23	3rd in PCSL	Lost Final, 1-2 Firefighters	Won 1964 BC Province Cup	
1964-65	24	12	3	9	25	44	38	4th in PCSL	Won 1965 Top Star Trophy	Lost provincial final	Won 1964 Challenge Trophy
1965-66	21	12	3	6	27	38	21	2nd in PCSL	Won 1966 Top Star Trophy	Lost provincial semifinals	
1966-67	21	14	4	3	32	43	15	2nd in PCSL	Lost playoff final series	Lost provincial semifinals	
1967-68	18	10	2	6	22	35	28	3rd in PCSL	Lost playoff final series	Won 1968 BC Province Cup	
1968-69	24	19	2	3	40	63	12	1st in PCSL	Won 1969 Top Star Trophy	Won 1969 BC Province Cup	Runner up 1968 Challenge Trophy
1969-70	16	12	4	0	28	33	4	1st in PCSL	Won 1970 Top Star Trophy		Won 1969 Challenge Trophy
1970-71	24	16	4	4	36	53	22	1st in PCSL	Lost Final, 1-2 Croatia SC		
1972	22	15	4	3	34			1st in BCPSL	No playoffs		

== Honours ==
Canada Soccer Hall of Fame: Organization of Distinction	2013
Canada Soccer Challenge Trophy	1964, 1969, 1977, 1978
BC Soccer Hall of Fame: Organization of Distinction	2019
BC Soccer Province Cup winners	1964, 1968, 1969, 1977, 1978, 2007,2026
Challenge Trophy runners up	1968, 2007,2026
Provincial Cup Finalist	2011, 2012 (Women)
National Soccer League Cup (Semi-Pro) Finalists	1986
Open Canada Cup National Runners-up	2007
Open Canada Cup Western Champions	2007
VMSL Imperial Cup Winners	1977, 1978, 1979, 1980, 2006, 2007
VMSL Imperial Cup Finalist	2013, 2014
VMSL League Champions	1976, 1977, 1978, 1979, 1980, 2013
Pacific Coast League winners	1968–69, 1969–70, 1970–71
Top Star Trophy (PCSL Playoffs)	1964–65, 1965–66, 1968–69, 1969-70
Anderson Cup (PCSL)	1959-60
BC Premier League winners	1972
Pacific Coast Soccer League winners	1988, 1989
Pacific Coast Soccer League Cup winners	1984, 1988
Pacific Coast League Junior Division winners	1965
Pacific Rim League President's Cup	1972, 1985
Pacific Rim League Champions	1986
JFK Kennedy Cup Winners	1989
BC Masters Provincial Cup Champions(Over 30/35)	1994, 1996, 2000, 2003, 2009, 2013
BC Masters Provincial Cup Finalists(Over 30/35)	1995, 1997, 2007
BC Games Over 55 Champions Gold Medal Champions	2014, 2015, 2016
National Masters Trophy Winners	2003
Western Masters Trophy Winners	2009, 2013
American Masters Over 50 Gold Medal Champions	2016
VMSL Over 40s League Champions	2012, 2013, 2015
VMSL Over 45s League Champions	2018, 2022
VMSL Masters A Cup Champions	2016
VMSL Masters B Cup Champions	2013, 2014, 2018, 2022

== National trophy winners by player for Columbus FC only ==
Player	Trophies	Years
Gene Vazzoler	4	1964, 1969, 1977, 1978
Peter Greco	3	1969, 1977, 1978
Sergio Zanatta	3	1969, 1977, 1978
Vanni Lenarduzzi	3	1969, 1977, 1978
Steve Djoric	2	1964, 1969
Bob Hazeldine	2	1964, 1969
Jim Berry	1	1969
Roy Nosella	1	1964
Carlos Franco	1	1964
John Comuzzi	1	1964
Sam Lenarduzzi	1	1969
Victor Kodelja	1	1969
Elio Ciaccia	1	1978
Joe Cuzzetto	1	1978

== Notable former players ==
Thirteen former Columbus FC players have been inducted into the Canada Soccer Hall of Fame as honoured players.

- (Canada) Eddie Bak
- (Canada) Chris Bennett
- Errol Crossan
- (Canada) Peter Greco
- (Canada) Victor Kodelja
- (Canada) Bob Lenarduzzi
- (Canada) Sam Lenarduzzi
- (Canada) Normie McLeod
- (Canada) Wes McLeod
- (Canada) Buzz Parsons
- (Canada) Ken Pears (on loan)
- (Canada) Bobby Smith
- (Canada) Gogie Stewart
- (Canada) Gino Vazzoler
- (Canada) Bruce Wilson
- Charlie Cuzzetto—-Futsal Canada Hall of Fame

There are other notable Columbus FC alumni who played, coached or been executives at the national and/or professional level.

- (Canada) Carlo Alberti
- (Canada) Dino Alberti
- (Canada) Ivano Belfiore
- (Canada) Luca Bellisomo
- (Canada) Gordon Chin
- (Canada) Elio Ciaccia
- (Canada) Frank Ciaccia
- (Canada) Tino Cucca
- (Canada) Charlie Cuzzetto
- (Canada) Joe Cuzzetto
- (Canada) Michael D'Agostino
- (Canada) Carmen D'Onofrio
- (Canada) Alex Elliott
- (Canada) Michael Findlay
- (Canada) Justin Isidro
- (Canada) Tiarnan King
- (Canada) Danny Lenarduzzi
- David McGill
- (Canada) Victor Montagliani
- (Canada) Steve Nesin
- (Canada) Joe Scigliano
- (Canada) Leigh Sembaluk
- (Canada) Guido Titotto
- (Canada) Sergio Zanatta
- (Canada) Gianluca Zavarise
- (Canada) Haris Hussaini
- (France) Mathieu Engel
