= FC Winnipeg Lions =

- Full name: Football Club Winnipeg Lions
- Nicknames: Lions, Sons
- Short name: FC Winnipeg Lions
- Founded: 1995
- Stadium: Ralph Cantafio Soccer Complex
- Capacity: 2,000
- President: Ted Nocita
- Head Coach: Tony Nocita
- League: Manitoba Major Soccer League
Home colours

The FC Winnipeg Lions (formerly known as Sons of Italy Lions Soccer Club), formed in 1995, is a Canadian soccer club that competes in the Manitoba Major Soccer League.

== History ==
Founded in 1995 as Sons of Italy Lions, the club officially changed their name in 2012. The Lions have won numerous league titles, trophies and cup tournaments. Since 2002 they have captured the Manitoba top division title twelve times (2003, 2004, 2006, 2007, 2010, 2011, 2013, 2014, 2015, 2016, 2017, 2018)

The club has represented Manitoba at The Challenge Trophy on a number of occasions, including winning the Gold medal at the 2002 championship by defeating St. Lawrence Laurentians 1–0. The Lions captured the Bronze medal in 1996 and again in 2013. In 2017 the Lions captured the Silver medal in a 1–0 loss against Nova Scotia representatives Western Halifax.
