= Montréal Carsteel FC =

Canadian soccer club

Montréal Carsteel FC (later known as Cancar FC) was a Canadian soccer club based in Montréal, Québec. They were one-time Dominion of Canada Football Championships winners, lifting the Challenge Trophy in 1948. They were recognized by the Canada Soccer Hall of Fame as an Organisation of Distinction.

Over the course of their soccer history, Carsteel FC played in several leagues and competitions and were at times either a professional or amateur club. They were renamed Cancar FC in 1949 and they played their last major season in 1953. The soccer team was owned (and named after) the Canadian Car and Foundry.

Wrote Winnipeg sports journalist Vince Leah in 1943, "you can name the famous Canadian soccer teams on one hand... Westminster Royals, Toronto Ulster, Montréal Carsteel and United Weston."

== Season-by-season record ==
Note: MP = Matches played, W = Wins, D = Draws, L = Losses, Pts = Points, GF = Goals for, GA = Goals against

Montréal Carsteel FC / Cancar FC record after the start of the Second World War.

Season	MP	W	D	L	Pts	Finish	Playoffs	Québec	Canada Playoffs
1940 National League	12	11	1	0	23	1st in NSL-QC	Won Atholstan Trophy	Lost Semifinals	Lost Québec Semifinals
1941 National League	12	9	1	2	19	1st in NSL-QC	Runners up	Lost Semifinals	
1941 City League	4	4	0	0	8	1st in NCL-A			
1942 Montréal	18	13	4	1	30	1st in MNL			
1942 City League	5	4	0	1	8	2nd in NCL-A			
1943 Montréal	10	6	2	2	14	2nd in MNL			
1943 City League	7	6	0	1	12	1st in NCL-A			
1944 Montréal	12	6	3	3	15	3rd in MNL			
1944 City League	5	3	0	2	6	3rd in NCL-A			
1945 Montréal	11	6	3	2	15	1st in MNL			
1945 City League	5	5	0	0	10	1st in NCL-A			
1946 Montréal	10	7	1	2	15	2nd in Mtl-NSL	No playoffs	Lost Final	Lost Semifinals
1946 City League	5	4	0	1	8	2nd in NCL-A	No playoffs		
1947 National League	15	4	2	9	10	4th in NSL-ON/QC	No playoffs	Lost Semifinals	Lost Eastern Final
1947 City League	4	3	0	1	6	2nd in NCL-A	No playoffs		
1948 National League	6	5	1	0	11	1st in NSL-QC	Won Atholstan Trophy	Won 1948 Coupe du Québec	Won 1948 Challenge Trophy
1948 City League	16	14	1	1	29	2nd in NCL-A	No playoffs		
1949 National League	10	10	0	0	20	1st in NSL-QC	Runners up 1949(50)	Lost Semifinals	Québec 1st Round
1949 City League	10	8	0	2	16	1st in NCL-A	No playoffs		
1950 National League	12	5	3	4	13	4th in NSL-QC	No playoffs	Lost Quarterfinals	Did not enter

Montréal Cancar FC record in the Montréal First Division (after Québec teams pulled out of the National League).

Season	MP	W	D	L	Pts	Finish	Playoffs	Québec	Canada Playoffs
1951	13	7	4	2	18	3rd in MSL	Runners up	Won 1951 Coupe du Québec	Lost Québec final
1952	16	8	2	6	18	4th in MSL	Runners up	Round of 16	Lost Québec final
1953	18	6	5	7	17	6th in MSL	No playoffs	Quarterfinals	Québec Quarterfinals

== Honours ==
National
Competitions	Titles	Seasons
Dominion of Canada Football Championship	1	Challenge Trophy 1948
Coupe du Québec	11	1925, 1927, 1931, 1932, 1933, 1934, 1937, 1938, 1939, 1948, 1951
Québec section winners for the Dominion Championship	7	1925, 1931, 1938, 1939, 1946, 1947, 1948
Interprovincial League	1	1925
National League Championship for the Atholstan Trophy	3	1936, 1940, 1948
National League Québec	7	Meighen Trophy 1939, 1940, 1941, 1942, 1945, 1948, 1949
National City League	4	Stanford Trophy 1941, 1943, 1945, 1949

== Notable former player ==
Eight former Montréal Carsteel FC players have been inducted into the Canada Soccer Hall of Fame as honoured players.

- (Canada) Marcel Castonguay
- (Canada) Paul-Émile Castonguay
- (Canada) Roland Castonguay
- (England) Sam Chedgzoy
- (Canada) Bill Gill
- (Canada) Eddie MacLaine
- (Canada) Doug McMahon
- (Canada) Arthur Woutersz
