= Edmonton Ital Canadian SC =

Canadian soccer club

Edmonton Ital Canadian SC is a Canadian soccer club based in Edmonton, Alberta. They have lifted the Challenge Trophy twice as Canadian amateur champions (1994 and 1997). They have recognised by the Canada Soccer Hall of Fame as an Organisation of Distinction.

Over the course of their history, they have played in several leagues and competitions. They played their first season in the Edmonton & District League First Division in 1962. They won their first of 16 Alberta Cup provincial championships in 1966.

== Honours ==
National
| Competitions | Titles | Seasons |
|---|---|---|
| Canada Soccer's National Championships for the Challenge Trophy | 3 | 1994, 1997 |
| Alberta Cup | 16 | 1966, 1971, 1975, 1977, 1981, 1984, 1985, 1986, 1988, 1989, 1990, 1993, 1994, 1995, 1997, 2001 |

== Notable former players ==
One former Edmonton Ital Canadian SC player has been inducted into the Canada Soccer Hall of Fame as an honoured player.

- (Canada) Lars Hirschfeld
