= Winnipeg Scottish FC =

Winnipeg Scottish FC or later Winnipeg AN&AF Scottish FC was a Canadian soccer club based in Winnipeg, Manitoba. They were three-time Canada Soccer winners, lifting the Connaught Cup in 1915 and the Challenge Trophy in 1954 and 1962. They were Canadian runners up in 1947, 1950, and 1958.

Over the course of their soccer history, they played in several leagues and competitions in Manitoba. They won their first Manitoba Cup provincial championship in 1914.

== Honours ==
National
Competitions	Titles	Seasons
Dominion of Canada Football Championship	3	Connaught Cup 1915, Challenge Trophy 1954, 1962
Manitoba section winners for the Dominion Championship	12	1915, 1947, 1949, 1950, 1951, 1953, 1954, 1958, 1959, 1962, 1964, 1965
Manitoba Cup	14	1914, 1917, 1919, 1927, 1949, 1950, 1951, 1952, 1953, 1958, 1959, 1962, 1964, 1965
John Queen Memorial Trophy	6	1947, 1952, 1954, 1955, 1957, 1958

== Notable former player ==
Two former Winnipeg AN&AF Scottish FC players have been inducted into the Canada Soccer Hall of Fame.

- (Canada) John Schepers
- (Canada) Frederick Stambrook

One former Winnipeg Scottish FC player has been inducted into the Canadian Sports Hall of Fame for his career as a curler.

- (Canada) Pappy Wood
