= Ralph Makepeace =

English footballer (1909–1995)

Personal information
- Full name: Ralph Makepeace
- Date of birth: 23 February 1909
- Place of birth: Trimdon Grange, England
- Date of death: 1995 (aged 85–86)
- Place of death: Borough of Hartlepool, England
- Height: 6 ft 1 in (1.85 m)
- Positions: Left half; centre half

Senior career*
Years	Team	Apps	(Gls)
192?–1929	Trimdon Grange Recreation		
1929–1930	Prince Albert Penitentiary		
1930	Sons of England		
1930–1931	Westminster Royals		
1931	Blackhall Colliery Welfare		
1931–1932	Sunderland	0	(0)
1932–1934	Hartlepools United	45	(2)
1934	Blackhall Colliery Welfare		
1934–1935	Darlington	1	(0)
1935–	Blackhall Colliery Welfare		
- * Club domestic league appearances and goals

Ralph Makepeace (23 February 1909 – 1995) was an English footballer who played as a left half or centre half. After beginning his career in English local football, he emigrated to Canada, where he spent two years playing for Canadian clubs, including representing the province of Saskatchewan in the Dominion Championships. He returned to England and played for Blackhall Colliery Welfare, from where he signed for Football League First Division club Sunderland. He was released after a few months, and joined Third Division North club Hartlepools United, with whom he played 45 matches in the Football League over two seasons. He also played once in the Third Division for Darlington in between further spells with Blackhall Welfare.

== Personal life ==
Makepeace was born in Trimdon Grange, County Durham, the fourth child of Robert Hutchison Makepeace, a coal miner, and his wife Eleanor. At the time of the 1911 Census, the family were living in Ferryhill. Several of his brothers were good at football: his three older brothers played for teams in Canada, and his younger brother Robert was on the books of Hartlepools United, though never played for their first team. He married Vera Kirkbride in September 1936. Makepeace died in early 1995 in the Hartlepool area. (Note: Makepeace's death was registered in February 1995 in the North Cleveland registration district, which corresponds to the Borough of Hartlepool.)

== Football career ==
Makepeace played football as a left half for his local club, Trimdon Grange Recreation, and had a trial with Football League First Division club Leicester City. In April 1929, he followed his older brothers Tom and Joe to Canada where they were playing for the Prince Albert Penitentiary club, soon to be joined by another brother, Cud. From Prince Albert, Makepeace joined the Saskatoon-based Sons of England in the spring of 1930. He helped them win that year's Saskatchewan Challenge Shield and with it the right to represent the province in the Dominion Championships; they lost to Manitoba's Winnipeg Hearts in the regional qualifier. Makepeace played as a forward in the second leg to accommodate other players in the half-back line. He, his brother Cud and another player moved on to Challenge Trophy-holders the Westminster Royals for 1931, a move attributed by the Manitoba Free Press to the lack of suitable off-field employment to fit in with the requirements of their football career.

He returned to England in 1931 and resumed his domestic career with Blackhall Colliery Welfare of the Wearside League. In October, he joined First Division club Sunderland on trial. While he was still in Canada, in a match between Westminster Royals and a Football Association touring side that included numerous international players, Makepeace had played at left half against the England and Sunderland right winger Tommy Urwin, who recommended him to the club. His performance during the initial month earned him a contract, but he played only for the reserve team and was listed for transfer at the end of the season.

Makepeace signed for Third Division North club Hartlepools United ahead of the 1932–33 season. In a pre-season practice match, the Northern Daily Mail thought him to be "a worker, but not over constructive". He made his Football League debut on 3 September, in Hartlepools' first home game of the season, a 3–1 win against Wrexham; the Mail's correspondent thought he would keep his place, despite a lack of pace. He was reportedly outstanding against Gateshead, but a few weeks later, he appeared to lack both speed and stamina, and his form was "so far below that of which we know he is capable, that I can conclude only that it was too bad to be true or permanent". The next week, he was tried at centre half, and played well defensively, although the Mail's reporter was unimpressed with the way he "punted the ball down the field, anywhere so long as he parted with it", and felt he would need to improve the constructive side of his game if he was to keep the position. He was a regular selection through the season when fit, but missed games in the winter with a damaged thigh and at the end of the season, also because of injury. He came back into the side in mid-October 1933, and played regularly until the following February, when he sustained an ankle injury, and appeared only twice more in what remained of the season. Despite having been the subject of transfer interest during the season, Makepeace was given a free transfer at the end of it, and returned to Blackhall Welfare.

Makepeace played once more in the Football League. He signed for Third Division Darlington in November 1934, and was preferred to Arthur Childs as replacement for the injured Dan Cassidy in the New Year's Day match at home to Accrington Stanley, a 5–0 win. After leaving Darlington, he returned once more to Blackhall Colliery Welfare. By 1937, he was the team's captain. He helped them reach a standard high enough to earn the club admission to the North-Eastern League for the 1939–40 season, remained with them during the early months of the Second World War, and was brought back into service after it when a rule forbidding guest players was introduced for the 1945–46 Durham Challenge Cup.
