= 1949 Dominion of Canada Football Championship =

Tournament details
- Country: Canada

Final positions
- Champions: North Shore United FC (2nd title)
- Runners-up: Hamilton Westinghouse FC

The 1949 Dominion of Canada Football Championship was the 28th staging of the Canada Soccer's domestic football club competition. North Shore United FC won the Challenge Trophy for the second time, beating Hamilton Westinghouse FC in a best-of-three final at Mewata Stadium in Calgary from 6-10 August 1949.

After the Canadian Final, Dominion of Canada Football Association's outgoing president Dr. O.J. Todd presented the Challenge Trophy to North Shore captain Tom Cumming.

On the road to the Canadian Final, North Shore United FC beat Vancouver City FC in the British Columbia section at Callister Park and then beat Edmonton North Side Legion FC in the Western Final at Edmonton.
