= Ontario Cup =

Canadian annual soccer tournament, founded 1901

- Founded: 1901
- Region: Ontario, Canada (CONCACAF)
- Current champions: Gloucester Celtic (5th title)
- Most championships: Hamilton Westinghouse (6 titles)

The Ontario Cup is a soccer tournament for clubs based in the province of Ontario in Canada. It began play in 1901 under the Ontario Football Association League, now known as the Ontario Soccer Association, and is the oldest soccer competition in North America.

== History ==
The cup was first played as a senior men's tournament in 1901, making it one of the oldest active sporting competitions in Canada. It has been held every year since, with the exception of the World Wars.

By 2004, the cup featured at least 12,000 athletes, and by 2008 it featured over 600 teams across 22 different age levels. The final is played at the Ontario Soccer Centre in Vaughan, Ontario.

== Format ==
The competition is played from May to September every year to crown a champion in each of 22 divisions, including different age levels for boys, girls and adults, and a Special Olympics division. The Ontario Cup winners from the under-14, under-16, under-18 and senior open divisions advance to the Canadian National Challenge Cup to compete against the cup winners from other provinces in Canada.

== Men's Champions ==
- 1901 Galt FC
- 1902 Galt FC
- 1903 Galt FC
- 1904 Toronto Scots
- 1905 Seaforth Hurons
- 1906 Toronto Thistle FC
- 1907 Toronto Thistle FC
- 1908 Little York
- 1909 Toronto Thistle FC
- 1910 Galt FC
- 1911 Hamilton Westinghouse FC
- 1912 Hamilton Westinghouse FC
- 1913 Hamilton Lancashire
- 1914 Toronto Eaton's
- 1915 Toronto Lancashire
- 1916 Hamilton Westinghouse FC & Toronto Eaton's
- 1918 Toronto Scottish FC
- 1919 Toronto Old Country
- 1920 Hamilton Westinghouse FC
- 1921 Toronto Scottish FC
- 1922 Toronto Scottish FC
- 1923 Guelph Taylor-Forbes
- 1924 Brantford Cockshutt FC Blues
- 1925 Hamilton Westinghouse FC
- 1926 Toronto Willys-Overland
- 1927 Toronto Ulster United FC
- 1928 Toronto Scottish FC
- 1929 Toronto Ulster United FC
- 1930 Hamilton Thistle FC
- 1931 Toronto Scottish FC
- 1932 Falconbridge FC
- 1933 Falconbridge FC
- 1934 Falconbridge FC
- 1935 Toronto British Consols
- 1936 Toronto British Consols
- 1937 Toronto Ulster United FC
- 1938 Timmins Dome Mines
- 1939 Hamilton City
- 1940 Toronto England United
- 1956 Toronto Thistle FC
- 1957 Windsor Corinthians
- 1958 Sudbury United FC
- 1959 Hamilton City
- 1960 SC Golden Mile Toronto
- 1961 Windsor Caboto
- 1962 Toronto Royals FC
- 1963 Scarborough Thistle
- 1964 Sudbury Italia FC
- 1965 Oshawa Italia FC
- 1966 London Italia Marconi
- 1967 Toronto Ballymena United
- 1968 Toronto Royals FC
- 1969 Sudbury White Eagles
- 1970 Hamilton Italo-Canadian SC
- 1971 Windsor Maple Leafs
- 1972 Toronto San Fili
- 1973 Toronto West Indies United
- 1974 Windsor SS Italia
- 1975 Brantford Falcons
- 1976 Windsor Croatia SC
- 1977 Toronto Emerald
- 1978 London Italia Marconi
- 1979 Toronto Termitana
- 1980 North York Ciociaro SC
- 1981 Kitchener-Waterloo Olympics
- 1982 Hamilton Serbians SC
- 1983 Windsor Croatia SC
- 1984 Hamilton Dundas United
- 1985 Toronto Emerald
- 1986 Hamilton Steelers
- 1987 Scarborough Azzurri SC
- 1988 Toronto SC Braga Arsenal
- 1989 Scarborough Azzurri
- 1990 Windsor Giovanni Caboto Sting
- 1991 Scarborough Azzurri
- 1992 Scarborough Ulster Thistle
- 1993 Woodbridge Sora Lazio
- 1994 Scarborough Azzurri
- 1995 Windsor Croatia
- 1996 Scarborough Azzurri
- 1997 Hamilton Dundas United
- 1998 Hamilton Serbians
- 1999 Woodbridge Sora Lazio Strikers
- 2000 Woodbridge Azzurri
- 2001 Aurora SC Hearts
- 2002 London Portuguese
- 2003 Kanata Soccer Post
- 2004 Ottawa Royals
- 2005 Scarborough GS United
- 2006 Ottawa St. Anthony SC
- 2007 Woodbridge Italia
- 2008 AEK London FC
- 2009 Real Toronto FC
- 2010 AEK London FC
- 2011 Toronto Celtic
- 2012 AEK London FC
- 2013 Gloucester Celtic FC
- 2014 London Marconi
- 2015 London Marconi
- 2016 Gloucester Celtic FC
- 2017 Durham FC Celtic
- 2018 Caledon SC
- 2019 Ottawa St. Anthony
- 2020 Cancelled due to COVID-19 pandemic
- 2021 Gloucester Celtic FC
- 2022 Gloucester Celtic FC
- 2023 West Ottawa SC
- 2024 Gloucester Celtic FC

== Challenge Cup Ontario Section Winners ==
- 1947 Toronto Ulster United FC
- 1948 Toronto Greenbacks
- 1949 Hamilton Westinghouse FC
- 1950 Toronto Mahers
- 1951 Toronto Ulster United FC
- 1952 Toronto Italo-Canadians
- 1954 Hamilton British Imperials
- 1955 Toronto Ulster United FC
- 1959 Hamilton Italo-Canadian SC

== U13 Boys Champions ==
U13B Championship
Year	Winner	Score	Runner-Up
1970	Chinguacousy Mosquitos		
1971	Duffield Boys Club		
1972	Anglo Canadians		
1973	Scarborough Caledonia		
1974			Wexford Cameron Advertising
1975	St. Andrew Wynns Whippets		
1976	St. Andrew Schuller Machine		
1977	Mississauga United Falcons		
1978	Oshawa		
1979	Mississauga United		Brown Boveri
1980	Stampall Washer Chinguacousy		
1981	Niagara Falls Kiwanis Club		
1982	Oakville Sun Life		
1983	Guildwood Jimac Paints		
1984	Guildwood Rainford Kraus		
1985	Oakville		
1986	London Sports		
1987	London		
1988	Burlington		
1989	Wexford		
1990	Scarborough National Malvern		
1991	Scarborough National Malvern		
1992	Brampton Youth Harriers		
1993	Wexford Loyal Order of Moose		
1994	Glen Shields Athletics		
1995	Brampton Braves		
1996	Brampton Braves		
1997	North York Azzurri A	2–1	Mississauga Dixie Lightning
1998	Mississauga Dixie Strikers	1-1 (3-1 pen)	North York Azzurri A
1999	Scarboro West Rouge Firebirds	3–2	Woodbridge Strikers
2000	North York CS Azzurri	6–1	Brampton Bandits
2001	Woodbridge Strikers	2–1	North York CS Azzurri
2002	North London Dynamites	4–1	Glen Shields Sun Devils
2003	Glen Shields Sun Devils 'A'	4–1	Mississauga Falcons
2004	North Mississauga	10–0	North London Cobras
2005	Brampton Blast	4–3	Brampton East Chiefs
2006–2019	data missing, incomplete table		
2020	Cancelled due to COVID-19 pandemic		
2021	data missing, incomplete table		
2022	London Alliance	5–4	Brampton Elite SA - Prospects
2023	Milton Youth Soccer Club Blue	1–0	East York Atletico
2024			
2025			

== Women's Champions ==
Women's Championship
Year	Winner	Score	Runner-Up
1977	Armourdale Royal Reds		
1978	London Organic Health Foods		
1979	London Organic Health Foods		
1980	Niagara Springettes		
1981	London Concorde		
1982	London Concorde		
1983	Oakville Hair Boutique		
1984	Scarborough United		
1985	St. Catharines Jets		
1986	Scarborough United		
1987	Oakville		
1988	Scarborough United Dynamos		
1989	Oakville		
1990	Oakville		
1991	Scarborough United Rowdies		
1992	Oakville		
1993	Scarborough United Rowdies		
1994	Scarborough West Rouge Renegades		
1995	Scarborough Azzurri		
1996	Scarborough Azzurri		
1997	Nepean United Spirit		
1998	Nepean United Spirit		
[p1999	Nepean United Spirit		
2000	Rexdale Elites		
2001	Rexdale Elites		
2002	Oakville		
2003	Scarborough Azzurri Admirals		
2004	Scarborough Azzurri Admirals		
2005	Oakville Storm	2–0	St.Catharines Jets
2006	Ottawa Royals	1–0	Scarborough Azzuri Admirals
2007	London City Galaxy	9–0	Windsor Caboto Gold
2008	North London Galaxy		
2009	North London Galaxy		
2010	Barrie Spirit		
2011	Windsor Caboto Strikers		
2012	North London Galaxy		
2013	Scarborough GS United		
2014	Scarborough GS United		
2015	Scarborough GS United		
2016	Scarborough GS United		
2017	Scarborough GS United		
2018	Scarborough GS United		
2019	Scarborough GS United		
2020	Cancelled due to COVID-19 pandemic		
2021	Scarborough GS United		
2022	London Alliance FC Galaxy	2–1	King City Royals
2023	King City Royals	1–0	Caledon United FC
2024			
2025			
