= Falconbridge FC =

Canadian former soccer club

- Full name: Falconbridge FC
- Nickname: Falcons
- Stadium: Athletic Park

Falconbridge FC Falcons was a Canadian soccer club based in Falconbridge, Greater Sudbury, Ontario associated with Falconbridge Nickel Mines. They were three-time Ontario Cup provincial winners from 1932 to 1934.

Falconbridge FC played their first season in the Sudbury & District Football League in 1930. They won their first league title for the Anderson Trophy in 1930.

In 1933, Falconbridge FC entered the playdowns for the Dominion of Canada Football Championship for the first time. They were eliminated by McIntyre Mines in 1933 and then Frood Mines in 1934, but then won their Northern Ontario section in 1935, 1936 and 1939. They reached the Canadian Semifinals in 1936 and 1939.

From 1935 to 1937, the Sudbury & District League was affiliated with the National Soccer League as their Northern Ontario Division. Falconbridge FC won their division in 1936 and 1937; they were National League runners up in 1937 (after they lost to Toronto British Consols).

== Honours ==
National
Competitions	Titles	Seasons
Northern Ontario section winners for the Dominion Championship	3	1935, 1936, 1939
Ontario Cup (provincial championship)	3	1932, 1933, 1934
Sudbury & District Football League (Anderson Trophy)	4	1931, 1932, 1933, 1934
National League Ontario North (Anderson Trophy)	2	1936, 1937

== Notable former players ==
One former Falconbridge FC player has been inducted into the Canada Soccer Hall of Fame as an honoured player.

- (Canada) Harry Phillips
