= John Wildsmith =

English footballer (1911–2003)

Personal information
- Full name: John Bennison Wildsmith
- Date of birth: 17 June 1911
- Place of birth: Darlington, England
- Date of death: 11 January 2003 (aged 91)
- Place of death: Darlington, England
- Height: 5 ft 8 in (1.73 m)
- Positions: Inside right; outside right

Senior career*
Years	Team	Apps	(Gls)
- Darlington G.S.O.B.
192?–1936	Darlington	6	(0)
1936–1937	Spennymoor United		
1937–1938	City of Durham		
- * Club domestic league appearances and goals

John Bennison Wildsmith (17 June 1911 – 11 January 2003) was an English footballer who played as an inside right or outside right in the Football League for Darlington. He also played for Darlington Grammar School Old Boys, Spennymoor United and City of Durham.

== Life and career ==
Wildsmith was born in Darlington, County Durham, to Piercy Wilson Wildsmith, a grocer's assistant, and his second wife, Elizabeth Annie née Bennison. He had three older half-siblings. He played football for Darlington Grammar School Old Boys team before joining Darlington F.C.

Wildsmith appeared for their North-Eastern League team as a 17-year-old, selected at outside right to face Jarrow in November 1928. In October 1930, against Carlisle United's reserves, he was "a danger spot throughout the game" and scored twice as Darlington came back from a three-goal deficit to draw the match, and a year later, rumours linked him with a transfer to Wolverhampton Wanderers to help them gain promotion from the Football League Second Division, but no move took place.

He made his first-team debut for Darlington on 14 November 1931, filling in at inside right for the Third Division North match against Stockport County; "after six minutes, Wildsmith ... turned a pass smartly to Mitchell, who with a characteristic cross-shot flashed the ball into the net" for the opening goal of a 2–0 win. He played once more that season, and signed on again for 1932–33. Again, he was a regular in the reserve team but appeared only twice for the senior side, and the process was repeated in the 1933–34 season.

In September 1934, Wildsmith was reported to be of interest to Sunderland of the First Division, but he remained a Darlington player for a further two seasons. In October 1935, he was selected for the Rest of the North-Eastern League XI in the traditional fixture against that league's champions, in this case Middlesbrough Reserves. Having made no first-team appearance since January 1934, Wildsmith was given a free transfer at the end of the 1935–36 season, and he went on to play North-Eastern League football for Spennymoor United and City of Durham, where his team-mates included fellow former Darlington players in Arthur Childs and Dave Edgar.

The 1939 Register finds Wildsmith living with his wife, Gladys, in Danesmoor Crescent, Darlington, employed as an assistant stock registration officer by the Durham County Water Board, and serving in the Auxiliary Fire Service. Wildsmith died in Darlington in January 2003 at the age of 91.

== Sources ==
- Tweddle, Frank (2000). The Definitive Darlington F.C. Nottingham: Soccerdata. ISBN 978-1-899468-15-7.
