= 2003 Canada Soccer National Championships =

Tournament details
- Country: Canada

Final positions
- Champions: Calgary Callies (2nd title)
- Runners-up: Panellinios Montréal FC

The 2003 Canada Soccer National Championships was the 81st staging of Canada Soccer's domestic football club competition. Calgary Callies won the Challenge Trophy after they beat the Panellinios Montréal FC in the Canadian Final at Patro in Québec on October 13, 2003.

Ten teams qualified to the final week of the 2003 National Championships in Québec. Each team played four group matches before the medal and ranking matches on the last day.

On the road to the National Championships, Calgary Callies beat Calgary Villains in the 2003 Alberta Cup Final.
