= 1950 Canadian National Challenge Cup =

1950 Dominion of Canada Football Championship
Tournament details
- Country: Canada

Final positions
- Champions: Vancouver City FC (1st title)
- Runners-up: Winnipeg AN&AF Scottish FC

The 1950 Dominion of Canada Football Championship was the 29th staging of Canada Soccer's domestic football club competition. Vancouver City FC won the Challenge Trophy after they beat Winnipeg AN&AF Scottish FC after two matches at Callister Park in Vancouver from 12 to 14 August 1950.

After winning the British Columbia section, Vancouver City FC beat Calgary Callies FC in the Western Final on the road to the Canadian Final.

== Alberta ==
The Calgary Football Association reported the draw for the Dominion play downs.

- 10 June – Calgary Callies v. RCAF Flyers
- 14 June – Calgary Callies 2-1 Calgary Hillhurst FC
- 17 June – Calgary Callies 5-0 Lethbridge Miners
- Oliver St. Pats 4-2 Edmonton RCAF
- Edmonton North Side Legion FC 3-2 Anavets
- Edmonton North Side Legion FC 10-2 Oliver St. Pats
- home and home series with Edmonton must be completed by 15 July. First game 1 July.
- 1 July Calgary Callies 5-0 Edmonton North Side Legion

== Ontario–Quebec play-off ==
Montreal Hakoahs def. Toronto Mahers

=== Quebec ===
West End 2-1 Blue Bonnets (semi final at Charlevoix, 11 June 1950)

North End Hakoah v. Scottish (semi-final at Charlevoix, 13 June 1950)

== Manitoba–Saskatchewan play-off ==
This series was played by the Regina Nationals and Winnipeg Scottish.

Saturday 29 July 5–1 at Taylor Field.

Monday 31 July 5-0

== Manitoba–Western Ontario play-off ==
This best of 3 series leads to the National Championship and was hosted by Winnipeg. Winner moves on to play the Regina Nationals to begin Saturday 29 July 1950.

Winnipeg Scottish v. Port Arthur Brent Park Monday 24 July 1950 – 5-2 Winnipeg Tuesday 25 July – Wednesday 26 July – if necessary

== Match list ==
Round	Home team	Score	Away team	Date
SK	Regina Nationals	2-1	Saskatoon Nats	7 July 1950
SK	Saskatoon Nats	0-2	Regional Nationals	22 July 1950
Quarter Final	Regina Nationals	1-5	Winnipeg Scottish	29 July 1950
Quarter Final	Regina Nationals	0-5	Winnipeg Scottish	31 July 1950
Semi final	Winnipeg Scottish	6-1	Montreal Hakoahs	7 Aug 1950

v

10 June 1950 Quebec Semi-Final	West End	2-1	Blue Bonnets	Charlevoix, Quebec
	Doug Smith	news	Gawn Croll

13 June 1950 Quebec Semi-Final	North End Hakoah	v	Scottish

== Western final ==
The Western final was contested by Vancouver City and Calgary Callies in Calgary's Mewata Stadium. The best of 3 series was swept 4-1 and 2–0.

v

v

v

== Eastern final ==
The Eastern final, or Dominion semi-final, was contested by Winnipeg Scottish and Montreal Hakoahs in Winnipeg.

5 August 1950 Semi-final	Winnipeg Scottish	6-1	Montreal Hakoahs	Winnipeg, Manitoba
	Midge Pennington; Don MacAngus; Ian Jack	Report	Pete Goldner 10'	Attendance: 2,000; Referee: Andy Bruce

7 August 1950 Semi-final	Winnipeg Scottish	0-0	Montreal Hakoahs	Winnipeg, Manitoba
		Report		Attendance: 1,600

8 August 1950 Semi final	Winnipeg Scottish	6-1	Montreal Hakoahs	Winnipeg, Manitoba
		https://news.google.com/newspapers?id=SSxkAAAAIBAJ&sjid=xnsNAAAAIBAJ&pg=7302%2C1203559 news

== National final ==
4-1	Vancouver, British Columbia
Report

15 August 1950 Final	Vancouver City	4-0	Winnipeg Scottish	Vancouver, British Columbia
	Wallace Milligan; Ivan Carr; Gogie Stewart	News		Stadium: Callister Park; Attendance: 350

v
