= Saint John Dry Dock Islanders =

Canadian soccer club

Saint John Dry Dock Islanders was a Canadian soccer club based in Saint John, New Brunswick. They were one-time Canada Soccer National Championship winners, lifting the Challenge Trophy in 1980. At the time, they played in the Atlantic Soccer League and they were the first team from New Brunswick to win the national title.

== Honours ==
National
Competitions	Titles	Seasons
Canada Soccer National Championships	1	Challenge Trophy 1980
New Brunswick Cup (men's provincial title)	4	1978, 1979, 1980, 1981
