= 1970 Canada Soccer Football Championship =

Tournament details
- Country: Canada

Final positions
- Champions: Manitoba Soccer (1st title)
- Runners-up: Québec

The 1970 Canada Soccer Football Championship was the 48th staging of Canada Soccer's domestic football competition. Manitoba won the Challenge Trophy after they beat Québec in the Canadian Final at Alexander Park in Winnipeg on 6 August 1970.

This marked the second time that the Canada Soccer Football Championship featured provincial all-star teams (1966 and 1970). Eight provincial select teams took part in the competition from 2-6 August 1970.
