= 1922 Dominion of Canada Football Championship =

Connaught Cup Series

Tournament details
- Country: Canada

Final positions
- Champions: Calgary Hillhurst FC (1st title)
- Runners-up: Toronto Ulster United FC

The 1922 Dominion of Canada Football Championship was the seventh staging of Canada Soccer's domestic football club competition. Calgary Hillhurst FC won the Connaught Cup after they beat Toronto Ulster United FC after two matches at Scottish Field in Toronto on August 10 and 12, 1922.

After winning the Alberta section, Calgary Hillhurst FC beat Nanaimo City FC and United Weston FC on the road to the Canadian Final.
