= Bob Harley =

Canadian soccer player

Robert Walkinshaw Harley (born 8 September 1888 in Renfrew, Scotland - died in Winnipeg, Manitoba, Canada in 1958) was a Canadian soccer player in the 1920s.

Harley earned his 7 Canadian national soccer team caps in captaining the side to a 2 wins, 3 losses, and 2 draws record in their 1924 tour of Australia and New Zealand in games against those countries' national sides.

Raised in Scotland, and in Rangers F.C.'s youth program for a time, Harley immigrated to Canada in 1911, settling to Winnipeg. He captained amateur club soccer for Winnipeg's United Weston FC, although he was not with the club when they won the Canadian Club Championships in 1924 and '26.

Harley was inducted into the Canadian Soccer Hall of Fame in 2003 and the Manitoba Sports Hall of Fame in 2004.
