= 1935 Dominion of Canada Football Championship =

Tournament details
- Country: Canada

Final positions
- Champions: Montréal Aldred FC (1st title)
- Runners-up: Nanaimo City FC

The 1935 Dominion of Canada Football Championship was the 20th staging of Canada Soccer's domestic football club competition. Montréal Aldred FC won the Challenge Trophy after they beat Nanaimo City FC after four matches at Carruthers Park in Winnipeg from 19-24 August 1935.

After winning the Québec section, Montréal Aldred FC beat Halifax St. George’s Aces, Falconbridge FC and Fort William Westfort Wanderers on the road to the Canadian Final.
