= 1938 Dominion of Canada Football Championship =

Tournament details
- Country: Canada

Final positions
- Champions: North Shore United FC (1st title)
- Runners-up: Timmins Dome FC

The 1938 Dominion of Canada Football Championship was the 23rd staging of Canada Soccer's domestic football club competition. North Shore United FC won the Challenge Trophy after they beat Timmins Dome Mines in five matches at Carruthers Park in Winnipeg from 10-17 August 1938.

After winning the British Columbia section, North Shore United FC beat Calgary Callies and United Weston FC on the road to the Canadian Final.
