= Atlantic Soccer League =

- Founded: 1980
- Country: Canada
- Confederation: CONCACAF
- Number of clubs: 6

The Atlantic Soccer League was a soccer league in Canada. The league operated for three seasons from 1980 to 1982 and featured teams from Canada's four Atlantic provinces. The league folded after the 1982 season.

The league was the second in Canada to feature clubs from three provinces. In 1981 with the addition of Corner Brook from the Newfoundland and Labrador Soccer Association, the Atlantic Soccer League became the second Canadian soccer league to operate a league schedule across four provinces (the defunct Western Canada Soccer League was the first in 1969).

Of note, 1980 league runners up Saint John Dry Dock Islanders won Canada Soccer's National Championships for the Challenge Trophy.

The league's third and final season kicked off June 13, 1982. For the final season, the league added two teams from Saint Pierre and Miquelon.

== Champions ==
Year	Regular season champions
1980	Scotia Olympics
1981	Dartmouth United Oland
1982	Dartmouth United Oland

== Teams ==
- Nova Scotia Canada Games (1981)
- Charlottetown Tradewinds
- Corner Brook Hawks
- Halifax-Oland SC / Dartmouth United Oland
- New Waterford
- Saint John Dry Dock Islanders / Kennebecasis Valley Labatt Blue
- Scotia Olympics
- AS Saint Pierraise (1982)
- AS Îlienne Amateur (1982)
