= George Davis (footballer, born 1881) =

English footballer and coach

Personal information
- Full name: George Henry Davis
- Date of birth: 5 June 1881
- Place of birth: Alfreton, England
- Date of death: 28 April 1969 (aged 87)
- Place of death: Wimbledon, England
- Height: 5 ft 6 1/2 in (1.69 m)
- Position: Outside left

Senior career*
Years	Team	Apps	(Gls)
- Alfreton Town
1899–1909	Derby County	134	(27)
- Birchwood Colliery
- Riddings United
- Ripley Ivanhoe
- South Normanton Athletic
- Stoneyford
- Codnor Town
- Calgary Hillhurst FC

International career
1904	England	2	(1)

Managerial career
- Manitoba
- * Club domestic league appearances and goals

George Henry Davis (5 June 1881 – 28 April 1969) was an English football player and coach, known for his time with Derby County and the England national team, playing as an outside left.

== Early and personal life ==
Born in Alfreton, Davis was the second youngest of eight children. In 1901 he was still living with his parents, and working as an assistant to his father as a greengrocer. By 1911 he was married with four children, and working as the hotelier of the Plough Inn in Alfreton.

== Career ==
Davis played for Alfreton Town, Derby County, Birchwood Colliery, Riddings United, Ripley Ivanhoe, South Normanton Athletic, Stoneyford and Codnor Town.

While playing with Derby he was a runner-up in the 1903 FA Cup Final, and earned two caps for England in 1904.

== Later life ==
He emigrated to Canada in 1912, playing for Calgary Hillhurst FC (winning the Canadian Cup in 1922) and coaching Manitoba. He worked in the hotel business in Calgary. He returned to England in the 1950s, dying in Wimbledon.
