= 1913 Canadian National Challenge Cup =

1913 Dominion of Canada Football Championship
Connaught Cup Series

Tournament details
- Country: Canada
- Teams: 4

Final positions
- Champions: Norwood Wanderers FC (1st title)
- Runners-up: Lachine

The 1913 Dominion of Canada Football Championship was the first staging of Canada Soccer's domestic football club competition. Norwood Wanderers FC of St. Boniface, Manitoba won the Connaught Cup after they finished in first place in a four-team round-robin series in Fort William from 1-6 September 1913.

For the inaugural edition, four teams qualified to contest the competition – Fort William CPR from Fort William, New Ontario, Lachine from Montreal, Quebec, Norwood Wanderers from Winnipeg, Manitoba and Toronto Old County from Toronto, Ontario.

== Background ==
The idea for a Canada-wide soccer championship was born in Toronto on May 24, 1912 by the Amateur Athletic Union of Canada (AAUC). Later in the year, the Dominion of Canada Football Association (DCFA) was formed in Winnipeg, Manitoba. Members associations of the DCFA in 1913 included Alberta, Manitoba, New Ontario, Ontario, Quebec and Saskatchewan. The trophy that would be contested was known as the Connaught Cup.

== Format ==
The inaugural competition was played as a single round robin tournament. Each team played every other team once at a neutral venue hosted in Fort William, New Ontario. The competition was open to the six member associations of the DCFA but Alberta and Saskatchewan did not enter a team.

=== Teams ===
- Manitoba: Norwood Wanderers
- New Ontario: Fort William C.P.R.
- Ontario: Toronto Old Country
- Quebec: Lachine

== Overview ==
Norwood Wanderers won the inaugural competition after remaining undefeated throughout the competition. Lachine finished as runners-up.

=== Standings ===
Pos	Team	Pld	W	T	L	GF	GA	GD	Pts
1	(Manitoba) Norwood Wanderers	3	1	2	0	6	3	+3	4
2	(Quebec) Lachine	3	1	1	1	3	3	0	3
3	(Ontario) Fort William C.P.R.	3	1	1	1	5	7	−2	3
4	(Ontario) Toronto Old Country	3	0	2	1	3	4	−1	2

== History ==
Norwood Wanderers successfully defended their title a year later when the competition was hosted in Winnipeg, Manitoba. It would be the last season that the competition was contested as a round robin tournament. In 1926, the Connaught Cup was retired in favour of a new trophy – the Challenge Trophy – donated to the DCFA by the Football Association.
