= 1932 Dominion of Canada Football Championship =

Tournament details
- Country: Canada

Final positions
- Champions: Toronto Scottish FC (2nd title)
- Runners-up: North Shore United FC

The 1932 Dominion of Canada Football Championship was the 17th staging of Canada Soccer's domestic football club competition. Toronto Scottish FC won the Challenge Trophy after they beat North Shore United FC with back-to-back wins at Ulster Stadium in Toronto from 28-30 July 1932.

After winning the Ontario section, Toronto Scottish FC beat Fort William Canadian Legion and Montréal Blue Bonnets on the road to the Canadian Final.
