= 1930 Canadian Challenge Trophy =

1930 Dominion of Canada Football Championship
Tournament details
- Country: Canada

Final positions
- Champions: Westminster Royals FC (2nd title)
- Runners-up: Montréal CNR

The 1930 Dominion of Canada Football Championship was the 15th staging of Canada Soccer's domestic football club competition. Westminster Royals FC won the Challenge Trophy after they beat Montréal CNR in a best-of-three series at Carruthers Park in Winnipeg from 29 July to 2 August 1930. It was Westminster's second of four Dominion titles in a nine-year span from 1928 to 1936.

After winning the British Columbia section, Westminster Royals FC beat Calgary Hillhurst FC and Winnipeg Hearts on the road to the Canadian Final.

The Canadian final was watched by 7,000 fans in Winnipeg.

== Qualifiers ==
Calgary Hillhurst FC def. Edmonton Callies (Alberta Final)

Westminster Royals def. Calgary Hillhurst FC (BC/AB Final)

Westminster Royals def. Winnipeg Hearts (Western Final)

== National Final ==
2 games to 1

Montreal Canadian National 5–0 in the 2nd game (31-Jul-1930) Westminster Royals 1–0 in the 3rd game (3-Aug-1930)

== Rosters ==
=== Montreal ===
Nelson; Barnes and Duguid; Low, Kerr and Campbell; Howley, Henderson, Bill Finlayson, Westwater, Green.

=== New Westminster ===
Sanford; Anderson and Waugh; Les Rimmer, Stoddart and Delaney; McDougall, Trotter, Coulter, Turner, D'Easum.
