= 2005 Canadian National Challenge Cup =

2005 Canada Soccer National Championships
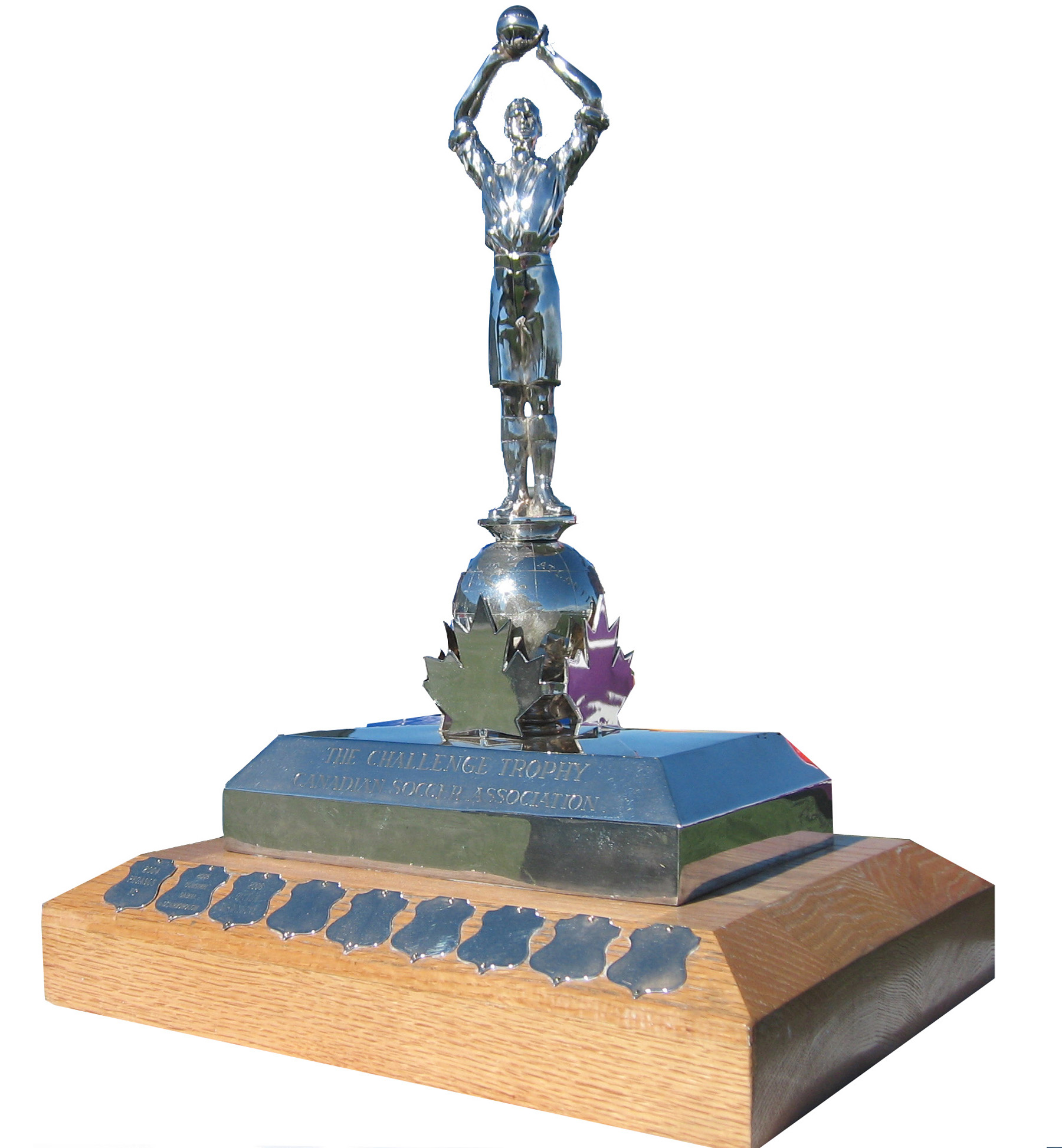
- The Challenge Trophy

Tournament details
- Country: Canada

Final positions
- Champions: Scarborough GS United (1st title)
- Runners-up: Edmonton Green & Gold

The 2005 Canada Soccer National Championships was the 83rd staging of Canada Soccer's domestic football club competition. Scarborough GS United won the Challenge Trophy after they beat Edmonton Green & Gold in the Canadian Final at Broadview Park in Calgary on 10 October 2005.

Scarborough GS United won 3-2 in the Canadian Final. Tom Kouzmanis, Emil Calixerio and Sultan Haitham (extra time -119th minute) scored for Scarborough while Mark Korthuis and Ian Diaz.

Twelve teams qualified to the final week of the 2005 National Championships in Calgary. In the Semifinals, Scarborough GS United beat Panellinios Montréal FC while Edmonton Green & Gold beat the Calgary Dinosaurs.

On the road to the National Championships, Scarborough GS United beat Woodbridge Azzurri in the 2005 Ontario Cup Final.

== Rosters ==
=== Edmonton Green & Gold ===
Edmonton (Squad): Jordan Robinson, Devon Fraser, Jarin Myskiw, Neil Morrow, Jamie Belous, Troy Hart, Kenny Nutt, Damir Jesic, Nikola Vignjevic, Jordan Gillespie, Mark Korthuis, Ben Drummond, Sam Lam, Vikram Kaushal, Quenton Zalazar, Brett Bachelu, Ian Diaz, Eric Pinnell, Herman Braich, Matteo Saccomano.

Coach & Managers: Leonard Vickery, Manuel Barreira

=== Scarborough G.S. United ===
Scarboro (Squad): Courtney Campbell, Courtney Brown, Tony Marshall, Valentine Anozie, Emil Calixterio, Ryan Dummett, Decio Rego, Thomas Kouzmanis, Jonathan Westmass, Sultan Haitham, Shawn Long, Ron Belfon, Lyndon Hooper, John Williams, Wayne Morgan, Jermaine Coleman, Shaun Griffith, Richard Kirwan, Gus Kouzmanis, Lester Bruno.
