= 1929 Canadian Challenge Trophy =

1929 Dominion of Canada Football Championship
Tournament details
- Country: Canada

Final positions
- Champions: Montréal CNR (2nd title)
- Runners-up: United Weston FC

The 1929 Dominion of Canada Football Championship was the 14th staging of Canada Soccer's domestic football club competition. Montréal CNR won the Challenge Trophy after they beat United Weston FC with back-to-back wins at Carruthers Park in Winnipeg from 29-31 July 1929.

After winning the Québec section, Montréal CNR beat Oshawa General Motors and Fort William Canadian Legion on the road to the Canadian Final.

== BC/Alberta Final ==
Edmonton C.N.R. defeated Vancouver St. Saviours

== Western Final ==
Winnipeg's United Weston FC defeated Edmonton C.N.R. in three games.

== Canadian Final ==
29 July 1929	Montréal CNR	4-0	United Weston FC	Carruthers Park; Winnipeg, MB
	Bill Finlayson; Bill Finlayson; Joe Williams; Joe Williams			Referee: Bill Street

31 July 1929	Montréal CNR	5-0	United Weston FC	Carruthers Park; Winnipeg, MB
	Bill Finlayson; Bill Finlayson; Joe Williams; Dave Meldrum; Bob Campbell			Referee: Bill Street
