= 1961 Canadian National Challenge Cup =

1961 Canada Soccer Football Championship
Tournament details
- Country: Canada

Final positions
- Champions: Montreal Concordia (2nd title)
- Runners-up: Vancouver Firefighters

The 1961 Canada Soccer Football Championship was the 40th staging of Canada Soccer's domestic football club competition. Montreal Concordia won the Carling's Red Cap Trophy after they beat Vancouver Firefighters in the Canadian Final at Faillon Stadium in Montréal on 29 July 1961.

This was the last year in which Canada Soccer featured professional clubs in its national club competition until 2008 when it inaugurated the new Canadian Championship.

== Format ==
The eastern Canada based National Soccer League held a round robin series to determine a winner to play against the winner of the Eastern Professional Soccer League. The winner of that series would then face the western Canada representative.

== Squad lists ==
The following are some of the players from the games found in the news reports.

=== Montreal Concordia ===
- Olivio Lacerda (centre forward)
- Hector Dadderio (outside right)
- Emilio Svitch (GK)

=== Vancouver Firfighters ===
- Ken Pears (GK)
- Art Hughes (centre-forward)
- Art Bennett (forward)

== Matches ==
22 July 1961 Final	Montreal Concordia	1-0	Vancouver Firefighters	Montreal, Quebec
	Olivio Lacerda			Stadium: Faillon Stadium; Attendance: 4,000; Referee: Harry Sadler
