= 1937 Dominion of Canada Football Championship =

Tournament details
- Country: Canada

Final positions
- Champions: Vancouver Johnston National Storage FC (1st title)
- Runners-up: Toronto Ulster United FC

The 1937 Dominion of Canada Football Championship was the 22nd staging of Canada Soccer's domestic football club competition. Vancouver Johnston National Storage FC won the Challenge Trophy after they beat Toronto Ulster United FC in a best-of-three series at Carruthers Park in Winnipeg from 29 July to 2 August 1937.

After winning the British Columbia section, Vancouver Johnston National Storage FC beat CPR Glen Yards Montréal and Sudbury Frood Mines on the road to the Canadian Final.
