= 1921 Dominion of Canada Football Championship =

Connaught Cup Series

Tournament details
- Country: Canada

Final positions
- Champions: Toronto Scottish FC (1st title)
- Runners-up: Ladysmith FC

The 1921 Dominion of Canada Football Championship was the sixth staging of Canada Soccer's domestic football club competition. Toronto Scottish FC won the Connaught Cup after they beat Ladysmith FC after two matches at Toronto on August 3 and 6, 1921.

After winning the Ontario section, Toronto Scottish FC beat Fort William and Montréal CPR on the road to the Canadian Final.
