= 1957 Canada Soccer Football Championship =

Tournament details
- Country: Canada

Final positions
- Champions: SA Ukraina Montréal (1st title)
- Runners-up: North Shore United FC

The 1957 Canada Soccer Football Championship was the 36th staging of Canada Soccer's domestic football club competition. SA Ukraina Montréal won the Carling's Red Cap Trophy after they beat North Shore United FC in the Canadian Final at Faillon Stadium in Montréal on 22 September 1957.

On the road to the Canadian Final, SA Ukraina Montréal beat Montréal Sparta in the Québec Cup, Halifax Shipyards in the first round of the interprovincial playdowns, and Windsor Corinthians in the Eastern Final.
