= 1927 Dominion of Canada Football Championship =

Tournament details
- Country: Canada

Final positions
- Champions: Nanaimo City FC Wanderers (2nd title)
- Runners-up: Fort William Canada Legion

The 1927 Dominion of Canada Football Championship was the 12th staging of Canada Soccer's domestic football club competition. Nanaimo City FC won the Challenge Trophy after they beat Fort William Canada Legion with back-to-back wins at Carruthers Park in Winnipeg from 1-3 August 1927.

After winning the British Columbia section, Nanaimo City FC beat Edmonton Canadian Legion and Saskatoon Sons of England on the road to the Canadian Final.
