= 1934 Dominion of Canada Football Championship =

Tournament details
- Country: Canada

Final positions
- Champions: Verdun Park FC (1st title)
- Runners-up: Prince Albert City Reds

The 1934 Dominion of Canada Football Championship was the 19th staging of Canada Soccer's domestic football club competition. Verdun Park FC won the Challenge Trophy after they beat Prince Albert City Reds in a best-of-three series at Carruthers Park in Winnipeg from 11-16 August 1934.

After winning the Québec section, Verdun Park FC beat Sudbury Frood Mines in the Eastern Final on the road to the Canadian Final.
