= 1980 Canada Soccer National Championships =

Tournament details
- Country: Canada

Final positions
- Champions: Saint John Dry Dock Islanders (1st title)
- Runners-up: Ottawa Maple Leaf Almrausch

The 1980 Canada Soccer National Championships was the 58th staging of Canada Soccer's domestic football club competition. Saint John Dry Dock Islanders won the Challenge Trophy after they beat the Ottawa Maple Leaf Almrausch in the Canadian Final at St. Mary's Stadium in Halifax on September 14, 1980.

Four teams qualified to the final weekend of the 1980 National Championships in Halifax. In the semi-finals, Saint John Drydock Islanders beat Victoria West FC, while Ottawa Maple Leaf Almrausch beat hosts Halifax City Privateers.

On the road to the National Championships, Saint John Drydock Islanders beat Fredericton Schooner Caps in the New Brunswick Final and then the St. Lawrence Laurentians in the Atlantic Regional Playoff.
