= Olivio Lacerda =

Mexican footballer

Olivio Lacerda is a Mexican former footballer who played as a forward.

== Career ==
Lacerda played in the National Soccer League in 1961 with Montreal Concordia. In his debut season he finished as the league's top goal scorer, and contributed the winning goal in the 1961 Dominion Cup against the Vancouver Firefighters. In 1962, he signed a contract with Toronto City in the Eastern Canada Professional Soccer League. The following season he played with league rivals Montréal Cantalia FC for the ECPSL 1963 season. The remainder of the season he played in the American Soccer League with Philadelphia Ukrainians.

In the winter of 1963 he played with Club Deportivo Nacional in the Mexican Primera División. In 1965, he signed a contract with another league rival Primo Hamilton FC, but was later traded to Montreal Italica. Throughout his tenure with Montreal he assisted in securing the regular season title for Montreal.

In 1967, he was loaned to the American Soccer League to play with the Rochester Lancers. On August 2, 1967 he joined the Pittsburgh Phantoms in the National Professional Soccer League. Shortly after Pittsburgh released him. In 1969, he returned to the National Soccer League to play with Toronto Hellas. The following season he signed with league rivals Hamilton Croatia.
