= 2004 Canadian National Challenge Cup =

2004 Canada Soccer National Championships
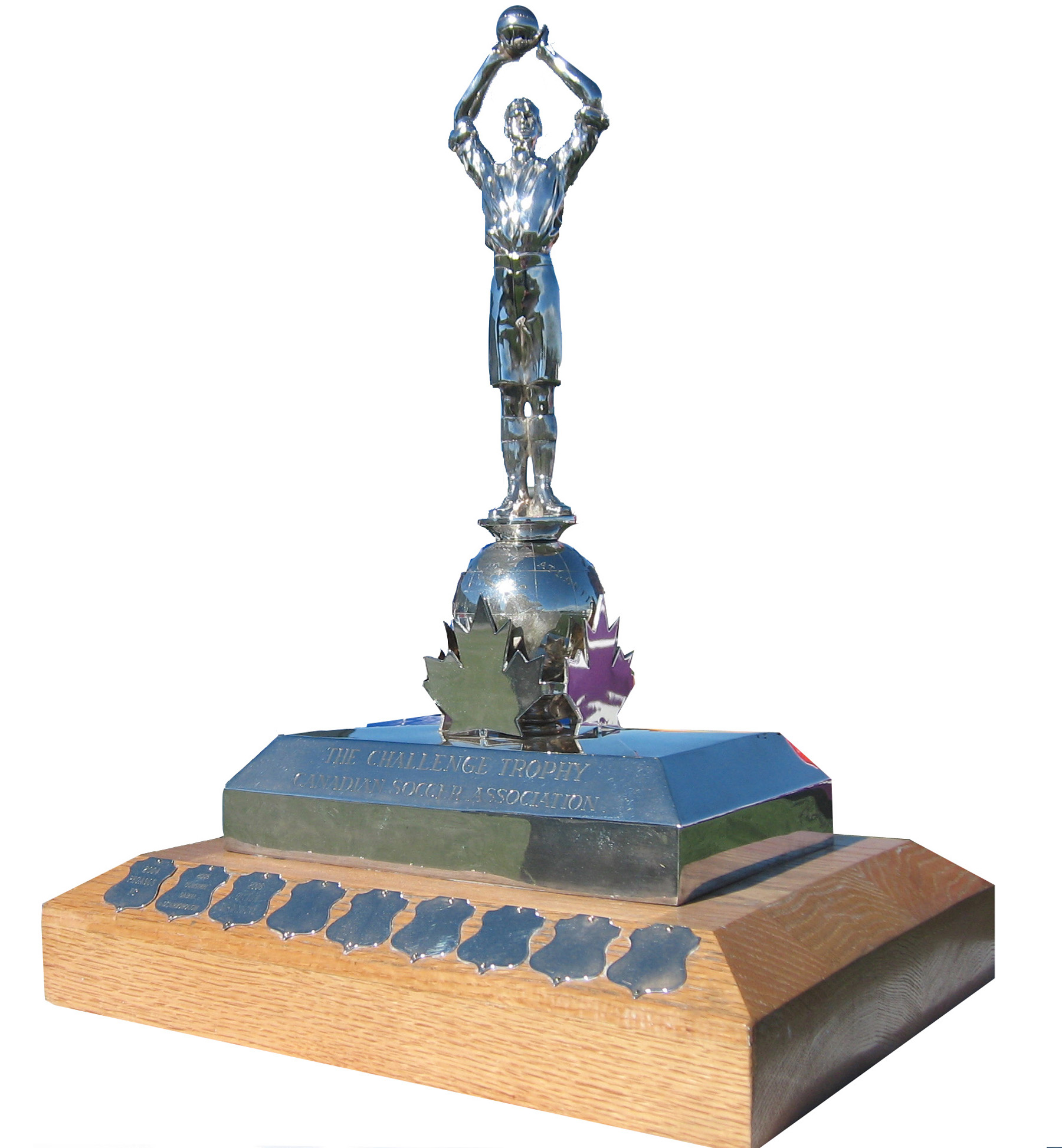
- The Challenge Trophy

Tournament details
- Country: Canada

Final positions
- Champions: Surrey FC Pegasus (1st title)
- Runners-up: Ottawa Royals

The 2004 Canada Soccer National Championships was the 82nd staging of Canada Soccer's domestic football club competition. Surrey FC Pegasus won the Challenge Trophy after they beat Ottawa Royals in the Canadian Final at UPEI in Charlottetown on 11 October 2004.

Ten teams qualified to the final week of the 2004 National Championships in Prince Edward Island. Each team played four group matches before the medal and ranking matches on the last day.

On the road to the National Championships, Surrey FC Pegasus beat Vancouver Westside FC in the 2004 BC Province Cup Final.

== Teams ==
1. Alberta - Calgary Callies
2. Quebec - SC Panellinios Montréal
3. British Columbia - Pegasus FC
4. Manitoba - Lucania
5. Prince Edward Island - Velvet Underground
6. Nova Scotia - Halifax Celtic Soccer Pro
7. New Brunswick - Fundy Labatt United
8. Saskatchewan - Saskatoon Arsenal
9. Ontario - Ottawa Royals
10. Newfoundland & Labrador - Marystown United

== Results ==
day 1	v

day 1	Fundy Labatt United (New Brunswick)	0-5	(Quebec) SC Panellinios Montréal

day 1	v

day1	v

day 2	Marystown United (Newfoundland and Labrador)	1-2	(Quebec) SC Panellinios Montréal
	Brian Francis 78'		Andrew Mallouk 7'; Andrew Tsartolias 56'

day 2	v

day 2	v

day 2	v

day 3	Marystown United (Newfoundland and Labrador)	2-3	(Nova Scotia) Halifax Celtic
	Johnny Pickett 49' (pen.); Jan Peddle 57'		Mark Sweetapple 80'

day 3	v

day 3	v

day 3	v

day 4	Marystown United (Newfoundland and Labrador)	1-0	(New Brunswick) Fundy Labatt United

day 4	v

day 4	v

day 4	v

day 5	Marystown United (Newfoundland and Labrador)	2-4	(British Columbia) Pegasus FC

day 5	v

day 5	v

day 5	v

11 October 2004	v

11 October 2004	v

11 October 2004 7th/8th place	Marystown United (Newfoundland and Labrador)	1-2	(Prince Edward Island) Velvet Underground

11 October 2004 Final	Ottawa Royals (Ontario)	0-0 (3-4 p)	(British Columbia) Surrey Pegasus FC	Charlottetown, PEI
				Referee: Dave Gantor

== Rosters ==
=== Surrey Pegasus FC ===
Surrey (Squad): Rob Iorio, Trevor Short, Randy Celebrini, Gavin Frey, Eddie Cannon, Paul Dailly, Darin Burr, Adam Costley, Ryan Powell, Nico Berg, Mike Dodd, Ryan Green, Robin Regnier, Frank Lore, Jamie Fiddler, Stedman Espinoza, Laurent Scalignine, Rob Reed, Steve London, Shawn Perry.

=== Ottawa Royals ===
Ottawa (Squad): Erik Lefebre - Andriy Sowarek, Simon Bonk, Declen Bonper, Dan Cheney, Sylvain Cloutier, Drew Dailey, Dan Degenutti, Alec Edgar, Dave Foley, Kweis Loney, Dylan Loy, Ewan Lyttle, Gord MacDonald, James MacMillan, Victor Mendes, Sanjeev Permar, Marcelo Plada, Dom Rochon, Roland Tinmuh.
