= 1920 Connaught Cup =

1920 Dominion of Canada Football Championship
Connaught Cup Series

Tournament details
- Country: Canada

Final positions
- Champions: Hamilton Westinghouse FC (1st title)
- Runners-up: Winnipeg Brittania

The 1920 Dominion of Canada Football Championship was the fifth staging of Canada Soccer's domestic football club competition. Hamilton Westinghouse FC won the Connaught Cup after they beat Winnipeg Brittania across two matches in Ontario from 4 to 6 September 1920.

After winning the Ontario section, Hamilton Westinghouse FC beat Montréal CPR and Fort William CPR on the road to the Canadian Final.

== Ontario ==
3 July 1920	Toronto Willys Overland	2-3	Hamilton Westinghouse FC	Toronto
	Fred Dierden; Bailey		Tiny Thombs; Tiny Thombs; Pilkington

== Final ==
4 September 1920	Hamilton Westinghouse FC	0–0	Winnipeg Brittania	Hamilton, Ontario
				Stadium: Harvester Park; Attendance: 3,500; Referee: Billy Murchie

6 September 1920	Hamilton Westinghouse FC	2–1	Winnipeg Brittania	Toronto, Ontario
				Stadium: Varsity Stadium; Attendance: 6,000
