= 1971 Canada Soccer National Championships =

Tournament details
- Country: Canada

Final positions
- Champions: Eintracht SC Vancouver (1st title)
- Runners-up: Windsor Maple Leafs

The 1971 Canada Soccer National Championships was the 49th staging of Canada Soccer's domestic football club competition. Eintracht SC Vancouver won the Challenge Trophy after they beat the Windsor Maple Leafs in the Canadian Final at Swangard Stadium in Burnaby on 3 October 1971.

On the road to the Canadian Final, Eintracht SC Vancouver beat Vancouver Paul's Tailor FC in the BC Province Cup Final, Edmonton Ital Canadian SC in the interprovincial playdowns, and Winnipeg Ital-Inter in the Western Final.

After winning the Challenge Trophy, Eintracht Vancouver SC lost to Toronto Croatia in the 1971 Export Cup at Stanley Park in Toronto on 17 October 1971. It was promoted as an "open championship" between the amateur winners of the Challenge Trophy and the winners of the National Soccer League Ontario.
