= 2006 Canadian National Challenge Cup =

2006 Canada Soccer National Championships
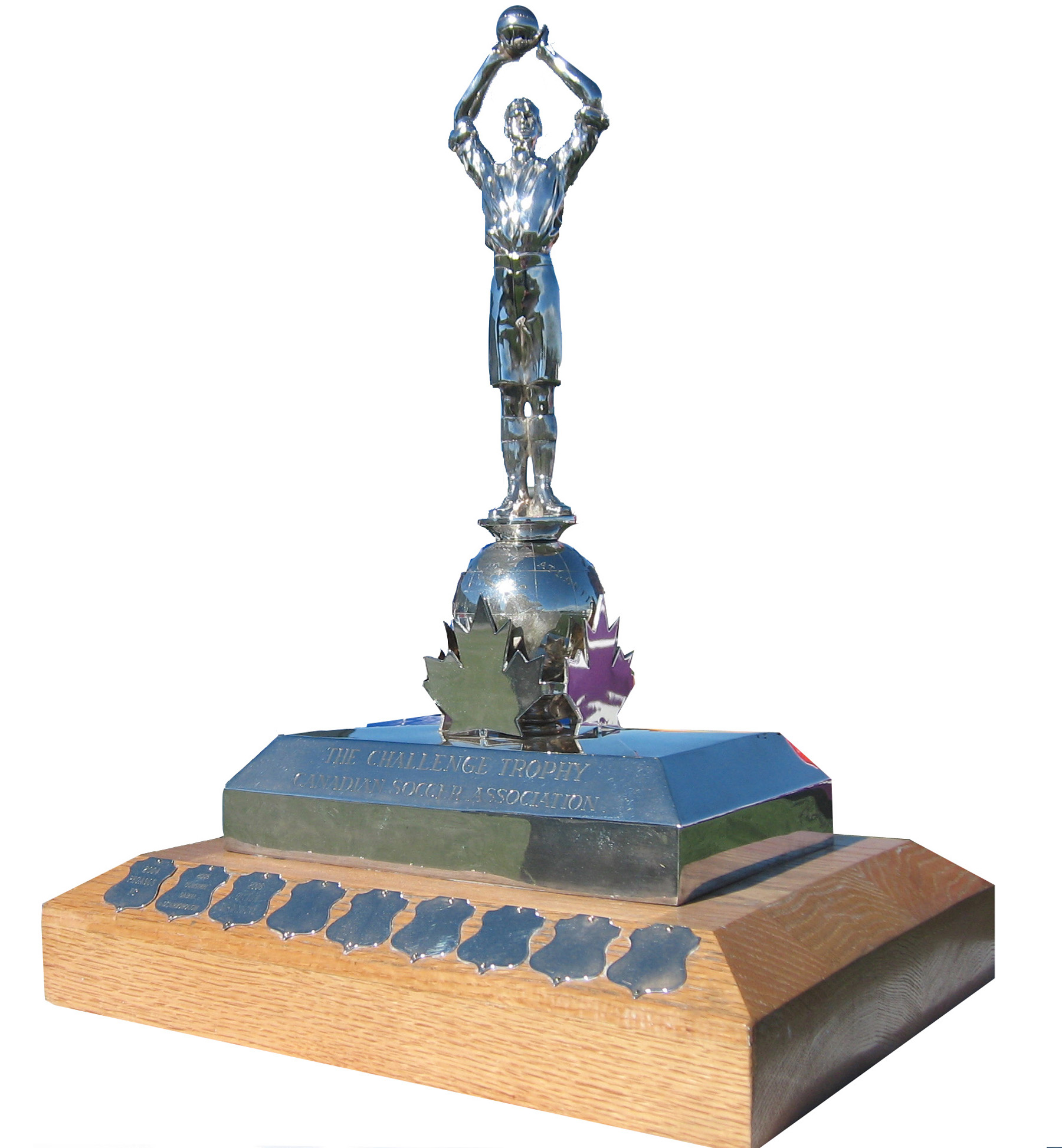
- The Challenge Trophy

Tournament details
- Country: Canada

Final positions
- Champions: Ottawa St. Anthony SC (1st title)
- Runners-up: Calgary Callies

The 2006 Canada Soccer National Championships was the 84th staging of Canada Soccer's domestic football club competition. Ottawa St. Anthony SC won the Challenge Trophy after they beat Calgary Callies in the Canadian Final at Newton Athletic Park in Surrey on 9 October 2006.

Twelve teams qualified to the final week of the 2006 National Championships in Surrey. In the Semifinals, Ottawa St. Anthony SC beat Scotia M-I Men while Calgary Callies beat Sélect Trois-Rivières.

On the road to the National Championships, Ottawa St. Anthony SC beat Glen Shields United in the 2006 Ontario Cup Final.

== Results ==
9 Oct 2006 Final	Ottawa St. Anthony SC	1-0	Calgary Callies	Surrey, British Columbia
				Referee: Jonathan Lavergne

== Rosters ==
=== Sapperton Rovers ===
Note: Flags indicate national team as defined under FIFA eligibility rules; some limited exceptions apply. Players may hold more than one non-FIFA nationality.

No.	Pos.	Nation	Player
—			
—			
—			
—			
—			
—			
—			
—			
—			
—			
—			

No.	Pos.	Nation	Player
—			
—			
—			
—			
—			
—			
—			
—			
—			
—			
—			

=== Ottawa St. Anthony ===
Note: Flags indicate national team as defined under FIFA eligibility rules; some limited exceptions apply. Players may hold more than one non-FIFA nationality.

No.	Pos.	Nation	Player
—			Angus Wong
—			Simon Bonk
—			Kwame Telemaque
—			Kwesi Loney
—			Richard Furano
—			Edgar Soglo
—			Urbain Some
—			Marcelo Plada
—			Souleymane Gagou
—			Abraham Osman
—			Scott Milliquet

No.	Pos.	Nation	Player
—			Johnny Schieda
—			Alessandro Battisti
—			Claudio Venegas
—			Ladislas Bushiri
—			Christian Hoefler
—			Allan Popazzi
—			Daniel Jones
—			Loui Legakis
—			
—			
—			

=== Calgary Callies ===
Note: Flags indicate national team as defined under FIFA eligibility rules; some limited exceptions apply. Players may hold more than one non-FIFA nationality.

No.	Pos.	Nation	Player
—			Dave Harrison
—			Will Langford
—			Ryon Pezneker
—			Cenek Patik
—			Ben Duffy
—			Arthur Paszkowski
—			Jimmy Reyes
—			Jamie Auvigne
—			Mark Slade
—			Steffen Holdt
—			Felix Napuri

No.	Pos.	Nation	Player
—			Liam de Silva
—			Ken Nutt
—			Tommy Wheeldon Jr.
—			Mike Rodway
—			Nicolas Reyes
—			Cody Cook
—			Miguel Romeo
—			Chris Kooy
—			Allen Jovica
