= 1954 FA Canada Championship =

Tournament details
- Country: Canada

Final positions
- Champions: Winnipeg AN&AF Scottish FC (2nd title)
- Runners-up: North Shore United FC

The 1954 FA Canada Championship was the 33rd staging of Canada Soccer's domestic football club competition. Winnipeg AN&AF Scottish FC won the Carling’s Red Cap Trophy (and Challenge Trophy) after they beat North Shore United FC in a best-of-three series at Alexander Park in Winnipeg between August 28 and 30, 1954.

Winnipeg AN&AF Scottish FC won back-to-back matches to capture the 1954 FA Canada Championship. They were the first Manitoba team to win the Canadian title in 28 years.

After winning the Manitoba section, Winnipeg AN&AF Scottish FC beat Port Arthur United and Hamilton British Imperials on the road to the Canadian Final.
