= 1956 Canada Soccer Football Championship =

Tournament details
- Country: Canada

Final positions
- Champions: Vancouver City / Hale-Co FC (2nd title)
- Runners-up: Winnipeg FC Germania

The 1956 Canada Soccer Football Championship was the 35th staging of Canada Soccer's domestic football club competition. Vancouver Hale-Co FC won the Carling's Red Cap Trophy after they beat Winnipeg FC Germania in the Canadian Final at Callister Park in Vancouver on 15 September 1956.

On the road to the Canadian Final, Vancouver Hale-Co FC beat Vancouver St. Andrews FC in the British Columbia section and then Calgary Danish Canadians in the Western Final.
