= Nico Berg =

Canadian soccer player (born 1973)

Personal information
- Full name: Nicolas Berg
- Date of birth: September 11, 1973 (age 53)
- Place of birth: North Vancouver, British Columbia, Canada
- Height: 5 ft 11 in (1.80 m)
- Position: Midfielder

Youth career
- Lynn Valley Falcons

Senior career*
Years	Team	Apps	(Gls)
1992	London Lasers	5	(1)
1992	Vancouver 86ers	1	(0)
1993	Winnipeg Fury		
1994–2002	Vancouver 86ers/Whitecaps	112	
2004	Surrey Pegasus FC		

International career
1988–1989	Canada U16	4	(0)
1991–1992	Canada U20	8	(0)
1994–1996	Canada U23	5	(0)
- * Club domestic league appearances and goals

Nicolas "Nico" Berg (born September 11, 1973) is a Canadian retired soccer player who played as a midfielder.

== Player ==
=== Club ===
Played youth soccer with the Lynn Valley Falcons and was a member of the UBC Thunderbirds men's varsity soccer team. Berg played in the Canadian Soccer League in 1992 with the London Lasers. In 1993, he played in the Canadian National Soccer League with Winnipeg Fury. In 1994, Berg joined the Vancouver 86ers in the American Professional Soccer League. Berg did not play in 2000, but returned to the team in 2001. That season, the 86ers were renamed the Whitecamps. Berg retired after the 2002 season. In 2004, he played for the amateur Surrey Pegasus FC when it won the 2004 Canadian National Challenge Cup.

=== International ===
Berg played one game at the 1989 FIFA U-16 World Championship. He went on to appear for Canada at the U-20 and U-23 levels.

== Physiotherapist ==
In 1997, Berg earned a bachelor's degree in physical therapy from the University of British Columbia. He later gained a masters in physiotherapy from the University of Queensland. He works as a sports physiotherapist.

== Career stats ==
Club	Season	League	League		Playoffs		National Cup		Total	
Club	Season	League	Apps	Goals	Apps	Goals	Apps	Goals	Apps	Goals
Vancouver 86ers	1994	APSL								
Vancouver 86ers	1995	A-League	8	0						
Vancouver 86ers	1996	A-League								
Vancouver 86ers	1997	A-League	24	0						
Vancouver 86ers	1998	A-League	3	0						
Vancouver 86ers	1999	A-League	26	0						
Vancouver Whitecaps	2001	A-League	9	0						
Vancouver Whitecaps	2002	A-League	11	0						
Career total										
