= 1968 Canada Soccer Football Championship =

Tournament details
- Country: Canada

Final positions
- Champions: Toronto Royals FC (1st title)
- Runners-up: Vancouver Columbus FC

The 1968 Canada Soccer Football Championship was the 46th staging of Canada Soccer's domestic football club competition. Toronto Royals FC won the Challenge Trophy after they beat Vancouver Columbus FC in the Canadian Final at Stanley Park in Toronto on 29 September 1968.

On the road to the Canadian Final, Toronto Royals FC beat Oshawa Montini Beavers in the Ontario Cup, Halifax-Oland SC in the first round of the interprovincial playdowns, and Lachine Johl Rangers in the Eastern Final.
