= 1924 Dominion of Canada Football Championship =

Connaught Cup Series

Tournament details
- Country: Canada

Final positions
- Champions: United Weston FC (1st title)
- Runners-up: Beloeil Canadian Explosives

The 1924 Dominion of Canada Football Championship was the ninth staging of Canada Soccer's domestic football club competition. United Weston FC won the Connaught Cup after they beat Beloeil Canadian Explosives after two matches at Carruthers Park in Winnipeg on July 24 and 26, 1924.

After winning the Manitoba section, United Weston FC beat Moose Jaw CPR and Cumberland FC on the road to the Canadian Final.
