= 1964 Canadian Nation Challenge Cup =

1964 Dominion Championship
Canadian National Challenge Cup

Tournament details
- Country: Canada

The 1964 Canadian National Challenge Cup was won by Vancouver Columbus who defeated the Sudbury Italian Flyers.

The Canadian National Challenge Cup, also known as The Challenge Trophy, is a national amateur football (soccer) cup in Canada contested by the champions of individual provincial soccer competitions.

In the Eastern Canada Amateur Soccer Championship, the St. Paul Rovers of Montreal and Sudbury Italia Flyers were left in a tie, 2-2, on August 30, 1964, The St. Anthony Italia went on to defeat the Montreal St. Paul Rovers 4–2, in the tie-breaking game in Sudbury on September 12, 1964.
