= 1923 Dominion of Canada Football Championship =

Connaught Cup Series

Tournament details
- Country: Canada

Final positions
- Champions: Nanaimo City FC (1st title)
- Runners-up: Montréal CPR

The 1923 Dominion of Canada Football Championship was the eighth staging of Canada Soccer's domestic football club competition. Nanaimo City FC won the Connaught Cup after they beat Montréal CPR after three matches at Carruthers Park in Winnipeg between August 4 and 8, 1923.

After winning the British Columbia section, Nanaimo City FC beat Coleman and Fort Rouge Rangers on the road to the Canadian Final.
