= 1919 Dominion of Canada Football Championship =

Connaught Cup Series

Tournament details
- Country: Canada

Final positions
- Champions: Montréal Grand Trunk FC (1st title)
- Runners-up: Ladysmith FC

The 1919 Dominion of Canada Football Championship was the fourth staging of Canada Soccer's domestic football club competition (the first since 1915). Montréal Grand Trunk FC won the Connaught Cup after they beat Winnipeg Great War Veterans across two matches at Montréal on August 14 and 16, 1919.

After winning the Québec section, Montréal Grand Trunk FC beat Toronto Old Country in the Eastern Final on the road to the Canadian Final.

As Dominion champions, Montréal Grand Trunk returned home and later won the provincial championship for the Québec Trophy in October.
