= 1967 Canada Soccer Football Championship =

Tournament details
- Country: Canada

Final positions
- Champions: Toronto Ballymena United FC (1st title)
- Runners-up: Calgary Buffalo Kickers FC

The 1967 Canada Soccer Football Championship was the 45th staging of Canada Soccer's domestic football club competition. Toronto Ballymena United FC won the Challenge Trophy after they beat Calgary Buffalo Kickers FC in the Canadian Final at Mewata Stadium in Calgary on 30 September 1967.

On the road to the Canadian Final, Toronto Ballymena United FC beat Oshawa Italia in the Ontario Cup, Verdun Celtic in the first round of the interprovincial playdowns, and St. Lawrence Laurentians in the Eastern Final.
