= Blackhall Colliery Welfare F.C. =

English football club

Blackhall Colliery Welfare
- Full name: Blackhall Colliery Welfare Football Club
- Founded: 1929
- Dissolved: 1959
- Ground: Miners Welfare Ground
- Capacity: c. 3,700
Home colours

Blackhall Colliery Welfare F.C. was an English association football club which participated in the North Eastern League and the FA Cup.

== History ==
The club was founded in 1929, and, at the second time of asking, joined the Wearside Football League for the 1929–30 season.

The club's best run in the FA Cup came in 1951–52, when the club won through the qualifying rounds for the only time. In the first round proper, Blackhall hosted Football League side Workington, and, although Blackhall had most of the early possession, the visitors scored two breakaway goals in the first 20 minutes, going on to win 5–2. The consolation for the home side was record receipts of £242 from a crowd of 3,633.

Halfway through the 1954–55 season, the club decided to resign from the North Eastern League at season end due to lack of support, and the club duly finished second bottom, with over half of the club's income coming from welfare funds. The club failed in a bold attempt to be elected to the Northern Football League in June 1955, its application not getting a single vote. The club instead rejoined the Wearside League, but continued to struggle at this lower level, although it did win the Monkwearmouth Charity Cup in 1956–57. However the club's support never picked up, and after several loss-making seasons, the club quit the Wearside League at the end of the 1958–59 season, and did not re-emerge again.

=== Later use of the name ===
The name was revived twice in later years; once in 1968, when Wearside League side Blackhall Club changed its name, but the revival only lasted one season, the club quitting the League, again due to a lack of support, which did not cover the £20 weekly expenses.

The second time was in 1976, when Blackhall Athletic, a Durham and District League side, adopted the name, This club joined Vaux Wearside League in 1987, and won the Division 2 Cup in 1990–91, beating Windscale 3–2 in the final. However, the following week the club turned up at the same opposition, late, and with an incomplete team, and lost 14–0. The cup triumph was the club's last achievement; at the start of September 1991, the club disbanded due to financial problems, with the support not covering the expense of League trips to Cumbria.

== Colours ==
The club wore black and white striped shirts, black shorts, and black socks.

== Ground ==
The club's ground, Welfare Park, off Eleventh Street, remains as a sporting venue, being used by teams including (as at 2025) the Hartlepool United academy side.

== Notable players ==
- Notable players ( 18 )
