= 1914 Canadian National Challenge Cup =

1914 Dominion of Canada Football Championship
Connaught Cup Series

Tournament details
- Country: Canada
- Teams: 5

Final positions
- Champions: Norwood Wanderers FC (2nd title)
- Runners-up: Fort William CPR

The 1914 Dominion of Canada Football Championship was the second staging of Canada Soccer's domestic football club competition. Norwood Wanderers FC of St. Boniface, Manitoba won the Connaught Cup after they finished in first place in a five-team round-robin series in Winnipeg from 7-11 September 1914.
