= 1926 Dominion of Canada Football Championship =

Tournament details
- Country: Canada

Final positions
- Champions: United Weston FC (2nd title)
- Runners-up: Cumberland Canadian Collieries

The 1926 Dominion of Canada Football Championship was the 11th staging of Canada Soccer's domestic football club competition. United Weston FC won the Challenge Trophy after they beat Cumberland Canadian Collieries after four matches at Carruthers Park in Winnipeg from 29 July to 4 August 1926.

After winning the Manitoba section, United Weston FC beat Fort William Great War Veterans and Toronto Willys-Overland on the road to the Canadian Final.
