= 1936 Dominion of Canada Football Championship =

Tournament details
- Country: Canada

Final positions
- Champions: Westminster Royals FC (4th title)
- Runners-up: United Weston FC

The 1936 Dominion of Canada Football Championship was the 21st staging of Canada Soccer's domestic football club competition. Westminster Royals FC won the Challenge Trophy after they beat United Weston FC in a best-of-three series at Con Jones Park in Vancouver from 8-12 August 1936.

After winning the British Columbia section, Westminster Royals FC beat Calgary Callies in the Western Final.

This was Westminster's fourth Dominion title in a nine-year span from 1928 to 1936.
