= Gloucester Celtic FC =

Canadian soccer club

Gloucester Celtic FC, based in Ottawa, Ontario, was founded in 1999. The club first captured major attention in 2013, winning their first Ontario Cup, subsequently followed by earning their first Canadian national amateur championship by winning the Challenge Trophy, defeating Surrey United Firefighters in the 2013 final in Halifax.

In recognition of that achievement, Ottawa Mayor Jim Watson and Ottawa City Council proclaimed January 22, 2014, a civic day in honour of the Celtic Men’s Team.

The team continued to build success, winning further Ontario Cups in 2016, 2021, 2022, 2024, and 2025.

In national competition, Gloucester Celtic added further Challenge Trophy titles in 2022 and 2024, going undefeated in the 2024 national championship and claiming the title with a 1-0 win over Nova Scotia’s Suburban FC.

== Management and Leadership ==
The club is led by coach and general manager Matt Williams, who has been involved in coaching for over twenty five years. He was elected to the Ontario Soccer Board of Directors in 2019, serving as the Chair of the Finance Committee.

== Silverware ==
Competitions	Titles	Seasons
Canada Soccer's National Championships Challenge Trophy	4	2013, 2022, 2024, 2026
Ontario Cup	6	2013, 2016, 2021, 2022, 2024, 2025
Ontario Cup (Masters O35)	1	2021
OCSL Bob Rathwell Cup	9	2012, 2013, 2015, 2017, 2018, 2022, 2024, 2025, 2026
OCSL League Titles (Mens Premier)	12	2011, 2012, 2013, 2014, 2015, 2016, 2017, 2018, 2019, 2021, 2024, 2025, 2026

== Notable Club Players ==
Gloucester Celtic FC players that have featured at the international "A" level.

- (Canada) Julian de Guzman
- (South Sudan) Nevello Yoseke

Other Gloucester Celtic FC players that have featured at the international level.

- (Canada) Olivier Babineau (Beach Soccer)
- (Canada) Bila Dicko-Raynauld (Futsal)

== Canada Soccer’s 2026 National Championships ==
In October 2026 Gloucester Celtic, along with its parent club the Ottawa Gloucester Soccer Club, will be playing host to Canada Soccer's National Championships for the men's Challenge Trophy. As hosts and the 2025 runners up, Gloucester Celtic will make their fourth appearance within the last five years in pursuit of their fourth Challenge Trophy.
