= 1958 Canada Soccer Football Championship =

Tournament details
- Country: Canada

Final positions
- Champions: Westminster Royals FC (7th title)
- Runners-up: Winnipeg AN&AF Scottish FC

The 1958 Canada Soccer Football Championship was the 37th staging of Canada Soccer's domestic football club competition. Westminster Royals FC won the Carling’s Red Cap Trophy after they beat Winnipeg AN&AF Scottish FC in the Canadian Final at Callister Park in Vancouver on 20 September 1958.

On the road to the Canadian Final, Westminster Royals FC beat Vancouver Hale-Co FC in the BC section and Lethbridge Bombers in the Western Final.
