= 1933 Dominion of Canada Football Championship =

Tournament details
- Country: Canada

Final positions
- Champions: Toronto Scottish FC (3rd title)
- Runners-up: Prince Albert City Reds

The 1933 Dominion of Canada Football Championship was the 18th staging of Canada Soccer's domestic football club competition. Toronto Scottish FC won the Challenge Trophy after they beat Prince Albert City Reds in a best-of-three series at Carruthers Park in Winnipeg from 3-7 August 1933.

After winning the Ontario section, Toronto Scottish FC beat McIntyre Mines and Montréal CNR on the road to the Canadian Final.
