= Hamilton Westinghouse FC =

Canadian soccer club

Hamilton Westinghouse FC was a Canadian soccer club based in Hamilton, Ontario. They were one-time Dominion of Canada Football Championship winners, lifting the Connaught Cup in 1920. They were national runners up in 1949. The team was sponsored by Canadian Westinghouse Company Limited.

Over the course of their soccer history, they played in several leagues and competitions in Ontario. Their last major season was 1956 before they quit the National League Ontario in August part way through the season.

== Season-by-season record in National Soccer League Ontario ==
Hamilton Westinghouse FC season-by-season record after they rejoined the National League Ontario (National League Ontario-Québec) in 1948. Note: MP = Matches played, W = Wins, D = Draws, L = Losses, Pts = Points, GF = Goals for, GA = Goals against

Season	MP	W	D	L	Pts	Finish	NSL Playoffs	Canada Playoffs
1948	16	15	1	0	31	1st in NSL-ON	Runners up	Lost in first round
1948 Frame	4	3	1	0	-	Won Frame Cup	-	-
1949	15	9	3	3	21	2nd in NSL-ON	Won Frame Cup	Won Ontario section, lost 1949 national final
1950	15	11	1	3	23	1st in NSL-ON	Atholstan Trophy	Did not enter
1950 Frame	1	0	0	1	-	Lost Semifinals	-	-
1950 Glebe	4	2	0	2	4	?	-	-
1951	24	7	7	10	21	5th in NSL-ON	Missed playoffs	Lost Ontario section final
1952	18	7	7	4	21	4th in NSL-ON	No playoffs	Did not enter
1952 Walker	10	3	3	4	9	4th in series	Missed playoff	-
1953	16	4	2	10	10	9th in NSL-ON	No playoffs	Did not enter
1953 Arnold Cup	?	?	?	?	?	? in series	Missed playoffs	-
1954	20	5	3	2	13	9th in NSL-ON/QC	No playoffs	Did not enter
1954 Arnold Cup	8	4	0	4	8	3rd in Group	-	-
1955	18	3	8	7	14	8th in NSL-ON	Missed playoffs	Won Ontario section, lost Eastern Final
1955 Arnold Cup	?	?	?	?	?	? in series	-	-
1956	13	1	1	11	3	Did not finish season	-	Did not enter

== Honours ==
National
Competitions	Titles	Seasons
Dominion of Canada Football Championship	1	1920 Connaught Cup
National League Championship for the Atholstan Trophy	1	1950
Ontario Cup winners	5	1911, 1912, 1916, 1920, 1925
Ontario section winners for the Dominion Championship	1	1949
Spectator Cup (city championship)	7	1907, 1908, 1909, 1911, 1912, 1920, 1955
Canadian National Soccer League Walker Trophy	2	1948, 1950
NSL Frame Cup	2	1948, 1949

== Notable former player ==
One former Hamilton Westinghouse FC player has been inducted into the Canada Soccer Hall of Fame as an honoured player.

- (Canada) Albert "Tiny" Thombs
