= Edmonton North Side Legion FC =

Canadian soccer club

Edmonton North Side Legion FC (also known as Montgomery North Side Legion) was a Canadian soccer club based in Edmonton, Alberta. They represented Alberta in Canada Soccer's National Championships six times in an eight-year span from 1947 to 1954, but were then eliminated in the Alberta Final in 1955 and 1958. They reached the Western Final three times, but never played in the Canadian Final.

After soccer was reorganised in Edmonton after the Second World War, North Side Legion / Montgomery Legion won the Alberta Cup as provincial champions five times in a nine-year span from their inception in 1946 through 1954. They won seven-straight Edmonton & District League titles from 1946 to 1952. During their best years, their manager was Martin Collingwood, known locally as "Mr. Soccer".

Their last season in local football was 1961 when they finished third in the Edmonton League First Division. They won their last trophy in 1959 when they captured the Edmonton League's playoff championship for the Custom House Trophy with a 4-3 win over the Edmonton Hungarians.

== Season-by-season record ==
Edmonton North Side Legion FC season-by-season record in the Edmonton & District Football League. Note: MP = Matches played, W = Wins, D = Draws, L = Losses, Pts = Points. From 1947 to 1956, there were separate competitions for the Alberta Cup and the provincial playdowns to the National Championships. From 1957 forward, the Alberta Cup served as the provincial playdowns for the National Championships.

Season	MP	W	D	L	Pts	League	Local Cups	Alberta Cup	Canada Playoffs
1946	6	4	2	0	10	1st in EDFL	Won Dragoon Cup & won Vets' Martin Cup	Won Alberta Cup	-
1947	5	5	0	0	10	1st in EDFL	Won Vets' Martin Cup	Won Alberta Cup	Lost interprovincial playoff (Dominion Quarterfinals)
1948	11	10	0	1	20	1st in EDFL	Won Dragoon Cup	Won Alberta Cup	Lost interprovincial playoff (Dominion Quarterfinals)
1949	12	10	0	2	20	1st in EDFL	–	Lost Alberta Final	Lost Western Final (Dominion Semifinals)
1950	8	6	0	2	12	1st in EDFL	–	Lost Alberta Final	Lost Alberta section final
1951	7	7	0	0	14	1st in EDFL	Lost Dragoon first round	Lost City Final (by protest)	Lost Alberta section final
1952	11	9	1	1	19	1st in EDFL	–	Won Alberta Cup	Lost Western Final (Dominion Semifinals)
1953	9	4	2	3	10	2nd in EDFL	–	Lost Alberta Final	Lost interprovincial playoff
1954	12	12	0	0	24	1st in EDFL	Won Dragoon Cup	Won Alberta Cup	Lost Western Final (Dominion Semifinals)
1955	15	6	3	6	15	?? in EDFL	Won Dragoon Cup	Lost City Final	Lost Alberta section final
1956	12	5	0	7	10	5th in EDFL	–	Lost City Final	Lost City Final
1957	18	10	4	4	24	T-2nd in EDFL	Lost Playoff Semifinals	Lost City Semifinals	
1958	14	5	2	7	12	6th in EDFL	–	Lost Alberta section final	
1959	8	3	1	4	7	3rd in EDFL	Won Custom House Trophy	Lost City Semifinals	
1960	14	9	3	2	21	2nd in EDFL	–	Lost City second round	
1961	14	6	3	5	6	3rd in EDFL	–	Lost City Semifinals	

== Honours ==
National
Competitions	Titles	Seasons
Alberta Cup	5	1946, 1947, 1948, 1952, 1954
Alberta section winners for the Dominion Championship	6	1947, 1948, 1949, 1952, 1953, 1954
Edmonton & District League (First Division)	8	1946, 1947, 1948, 1949, 1950, 1951, 1952, 1954
Dragoon Cup	4	1946, 1948, 1954, 1955
Vets' Martin Cup	2	1946, 1947
EDFL Playoffs for the Custom House Trophy	1	1959
