= United Weston FC =

Canadian soccer club

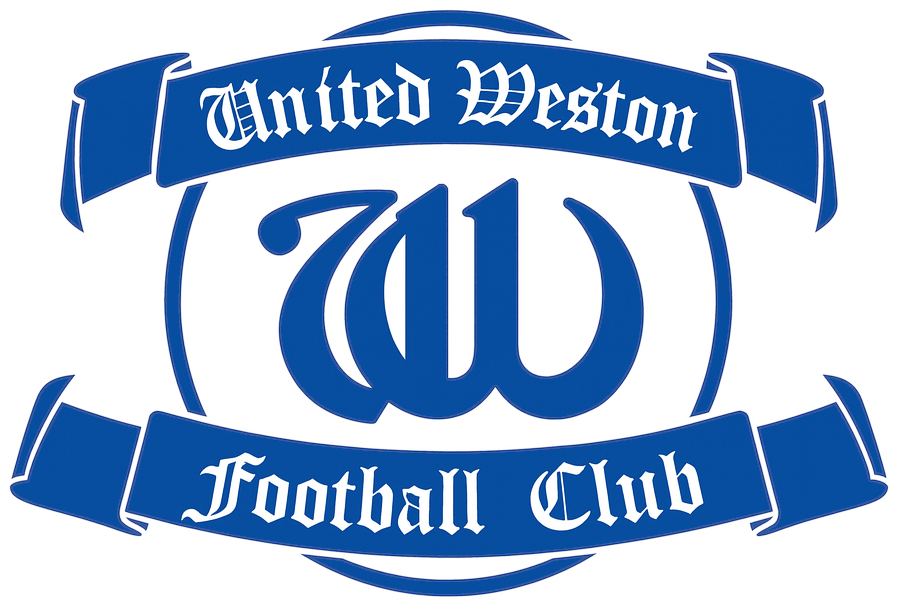
- Founded: 1909

United Weston FC is a Canadian soccer club based in Winnipeg, Manitoba. The club was established in 1909 in the Weston neighbourhood of Winnipeg. They were two-time Dominion of Canada Football Championship winners, lifting the Connaught Cup in 1924 and the Challenge Trophy in 1926. They were Dominion runners up in 1929 and 1936. They were recognized by the Canada Soccer Hall of Fame as an Organisation of Distinction.

Over the course of their soccer history, they played in several leagues and competitions in Manitoba. They won their first Manitoba Cup provincial championship in 1909.

Wrote sports journalist Vince Leah in 1943, "you can name the famous Canadian soccer teams on one hand... Westminster Royals, Toronto Ulster, Montréal Carsteel and United Weston. When you think of soccer, you naturally think of Weston.

Their victory song was "Weston on the ball."

== Season-by-season record ==
Note: MP = Matches played, W = Wins, D = Draws, L = Losses, Pts = Points, GF = Goals for, GA = Goals against

United Weston FC record after the local league restarted in 1943 (initially known as the "Victory League").

Season	Division	MP	W	D	L	Pts	Finish	Manitoba Cup	Canada Playoffs
1943	Victory	8	5	2	1	12	1st Place / won Final (2-0-0)	Runners up	No competition
1944	Div 1	8	6	1	1	13	1st Place / won Final (2-1-0)	No competition	No competition
1945	Div 1	10	7	1	2	15	?? (Reached Final)	Won Manitoba Cup	No competition
1946	Div 1	10	7	2	1	16	2nd (Lost Final)	Won Manitoba Cup	Manitoba not affiliated / did not compete
1947	Div 1	??	??	??	??	??	?? (Reached Final)	Competition not finished	Lost Manitoba Final
1948	Div 1	??	??	??	??	??	2nd (Lost Final)	Won Manitoba Cup	Lost Manitoba 1st Round
1949	Div 1	??	??	??	??	??	?? in WDSL	Lost semifinals	Lost Manitoba 1st Round
1950	Div 1	12	??	??	??	??	?? in WDSL	Lost 1st Round	Lost Manitoba 1st Round
1951	Div 1	??	??	??	??	??	?? in WDSL	Lost provincial final	Lost Manitoba 1st Round
1952	Div 1 ↓	11	2	2	7	6	4th in WDSL	Lost semifinals	Won Manitoba section, lost Eastern Final
1953	Div 2 ↑	??	??	??	??	??	1st in Div 2	Lost Semifinals	Lost Manitoba Semifinals
1954	Div 1	10	5	4	1	14	2nd in WDSL	Lost Semifinals	Lost Manitoba Quarterfinals
1955	Div 1	13	7	1	5	15	3rd in WDSL	Lost Quarterfinals	Lost Manitoba 2nd Round

United Weston FC record in the Winnipeg National League after it was formed in 1956.

Season	MP	W	D	L	Pts	Finish	Playoffs	Manitoba Cup	Canada Playoffs
1956	9	1	3	5	5	4th in WNL	No playoffs	Lost Manitoba Final	Did not qualify
1957	11	2	3	6	7	3rd in WNL	3rd in playoffs	Lost in Semifinals	Lost second round
1958	11	6	3	2	15	2nd in WNL	Runners up	Lost Quarterfinals	Did not qualify
1959	15	8	3	4	19	2nd in WNL	Lost Semifinals	Lost Semifinals	Did not qualify
1960	18	11	1	6	23	3rd in WNL	No playoffs	Lost Semifinals	Did not qualify
1961	15	8	2	5	18	3rd in WNL	No playoffs	Lost Semifinals	Did not qualify
1962	12	6	3	3	15	3rd in WNL	No playoffs	Lost Semifinals	Did not qualify
1963	15	9	2	4	20	3rd in WNL	No playoffs	Won Manitoba Cup	No national competition
1964	18	10	2	6	22	3rd in WNL	No playoffs	??	Did not qualify
1965	12	2	0	10	4	7th in WNL	No playoffs	??	Did not qualify
1966	12	4	3	5	11	4th in WNL	No playoffs	??	No national competition for clubs
1967	14	??	??	??	??	??	No playoffs	??	Did not qualify
1968	14	??	??	??	??	8th in WNL	No playoffs	??	Did not qualify
1969	14	6	1	7	13	5th in WNL	No playoffs	Lost provincial final	Did not qualify

== Honours ==
National
Competitions	Titles	Seasons
Dominion of Canada Football Championship	2	Connaught Cup 1924, Challenge Trophy 1926
Manitoba section winners for the Dominion Championship	12	1922, 1924, 1925, 1926, 1929, 1934, 1935, 1936, 1937, 1938, 1952, 1957
Manitoba Cup	13	1909, 1915, 1916, 1918, 1921, 1923, 1928, 1935, 1938, 1945, 1946, 1948, 1963
John Queen Memorial Trophy	3	1939, 1951, 1958

== Notable former player ==
Four former United Weston FC players have been inducted into the Canada Soccer Hall of Fame as honoured players.

- (Canada) Eddie Derby
- (Canada) Bob Harley
- (Canada) Bill Matthews
- (Canada) Doug McMahon
