= 1962 Canada Soccer Football Championship =

Tournament details
- Country: Canada

Final positions
- Champions: Winnipeg AN&AF Scottish FC (3rd title)
- Runners-up: Edmonton Edelweiss FC

The 1962 Canada Soccer Football Championship was the 41st staging of Canada Soccer's domestic football club competition. Winnipeg AN&AF Scottish FC won the Challenge Trophy after they beat Edmonton Edelweiss FC in the Canadian Final at Empire Field in Vancouver on 22 September 1962.

Only three teams featured in the 1962 competition: provincial winners from Alberta, Saskatchewan and Manitoba. In the only interprovincial match before the Canadian Final, Edmonton Edelweiss FC eliminated Regina Concordia on 15 September 1962.

On the road to the Canadian Final, Winnipeg AN&AF Scottish FC beat Winnipeg FC Germania in the Manitoba Cup Final.
