= 1915 Dominion of Canada Football Championship =

Connaught Cup Series

Tournament details
- Country: Canada

Final positions
- Champions: Winnipeg Scottish FC (1st title)
- Runners-up: Toronto Lancashire FC

The 1915 Dominion of Canada Football Championship was the third staging of Canada Soccer's domestic football club competition. Winnipeg Scottish FC won the Connaught Cup after they beat Toronto Lancashire FC after two matches at Varsity Stadium in Toronto on August 11 and 12, 1915.

After winning the Manitoba section, Winnipeg Scottish FC beat Fort William CPR in the Western Final on the road to the Canadian Final.
