= 1939 Dominion of Canada Football Championship =

Tournament details
- Country: Canada

Final positions
- Champions: Vancouver Radials FC (1st title)
- Runners-up: Montréal Carsteel FC

The 1939 Dominion of Canada Football Championship was the 24th staging of Canada Soccer's domestic football club competition. Vancouver Radials FC won the Challenge Trophy after they beat Montréal Carsteel FC in four matches at Carruthers Park in Winnipeg from 31 July to 5 August 1939.

After winning the British Columbia section, Vancouver Radials beat Edmonton Civics and Winnipeg Irish on the road to the Canadian Final.
