= Calgary Hillhurst FC =

Canadian soccer club

Calgary Hillhurst FC was a Canadian soccer club based in Calgary, Alberta. The club was established in 1905 in the Hillhurst neighbourhood of Calgary. They were one-time Dominion of Canada Football Championship winners, lifting the Connaught Cup in 1922. Before Canada Soccer, they won The People's Shield in 1910.

Over the course of their soccer history, they played in several leagues and competitions in Alberta. Their last season in local football was 1950 when they finished second in the Calgary & District League. They won their last trophy in 1947 when they captured the city championship for the Dave E. Black Cup.

== Season-by-season record ==
Calgary Hillhurst FC record in the Calgary & District League after the second World War. Note: MP = Matches played, W = Wins, D = Draws, L = Losses, Pts = Points, GF = Goals for, GA = Goals against

Season	MP	W	D	L	Pts	League	Black Cup	Alberta Cup	Canada Playoffs
1946	3	1	0	2	2	3rd in CDSL	Runners up (round robin)	Lost City Final	-
1947	6	2	1	3	5	3rd in CDSL	Won D.E. Black Cup	Lost first round	Lost first round
1948	4	0	0	4	0	5th in CDSL	Lost Semifinals	Lost City Final	Lost City Final
1949	4	0	1	3	1	4th in CDSL	Lost Semifinals	Lost City Final	Lost City Final
1950	4	2	0	2	6	2nd in CDSL	Lost 1st Round	Lost City Final	Lost City Final

== Honours ==
National
Competitions	Titles	Seasons
Dominion of Canada Football Championship	1	1922
The People's Shield	1	1910
Alberta Cup	4	Bennett Shield 1919, 1922, 1924, Campbell Cup 1933
Alberta section winners for the Dominion Championship	3	1922, 1924, 1930
Calgary city championship for the Black Cup	3	1920, 1921, 1947

== Notable former players ==
One former Calgary Hillhurst FC player has been inducted into the Canada Soccer Hall of Fame as an honoured player.

- (Canada) Stan Wakelyn

One former Calgary Hillhurst FC player played for England's National Team before he moved to Canada.

- (England) George Davis
