= 1947 Dominion of Canada Football Championship =

Tournament details
- Country: Canada

Final positions
- Champions: Vancouver St. Andrews FC (1st title)
- Runners-up: Winnipeg Scottish FC

The 1947 Dominion of Canada Football Championship was the 26th staging of the Canada Soccer's domestic football club competition. Vancouver St. Andrews FC won the Challenge Trophy for the first time after they beat Winnipeg Scottish FC with back-to-back wins in Vancouver from 20-22 September.

Vancouver was selected as the host city for the 1947 Championship one year earlier during the Dominion of Canada Football Association's annual meeting.

Vancouver St. Andrews FC beat Vancouver Collingwood in the British Columbia section to advance straight to the Canadian Final.
