= 1966 Canada Soccer Football Championship =

Tournament details
- Country: Canada

Final positions
- Champions: British Columbia Selects (1st title)
- Runners-up: Québec Selects

The 1966 Canada Soccer Football Championship was the 44th staging of Canada Soccer's domestic football competition, although this was the first time it featured provincial all-star teams. British Columbia won the Challenge Trophy after they beat Québec in the Canadian Final at Alexander Park in Winnipeg on 3 September 1966.

Six provincial select teams took part in the competition from 28 August to 3 September 1966.
