= Arthur Childs =

English footballer

Personal information
- Full name: John Arthur Childs
- Date of birth: 25 April 1904
- Place of birth: Acomb, England
- Date of death: 1963 (aged 58–59)
- Height: 5 ft 11 1/2 in (1.82 m)
- Position: Centre half

Senior career*
Years	Team	Apps	(Gls)
1922–1923	Shildon		
1923–1928	Darlington	26	(2)
1928–1931	Hull City	74	(8)
1931–1934	Exeter City	62	(4)
1934	Accrington Stanley	0	(0)
1934–1936	Darlington	19	(4)
1936	Durham City		
Total		181	(18)
- * Club domestic league appearances and goals

John Arthur Childs (25 April 1904 – 1963) was an English footballer who played in the Football League for Darlington, Exeter City and Hull City.
