= Challenge Trophy =

Canadian men's amateur soccer tournament

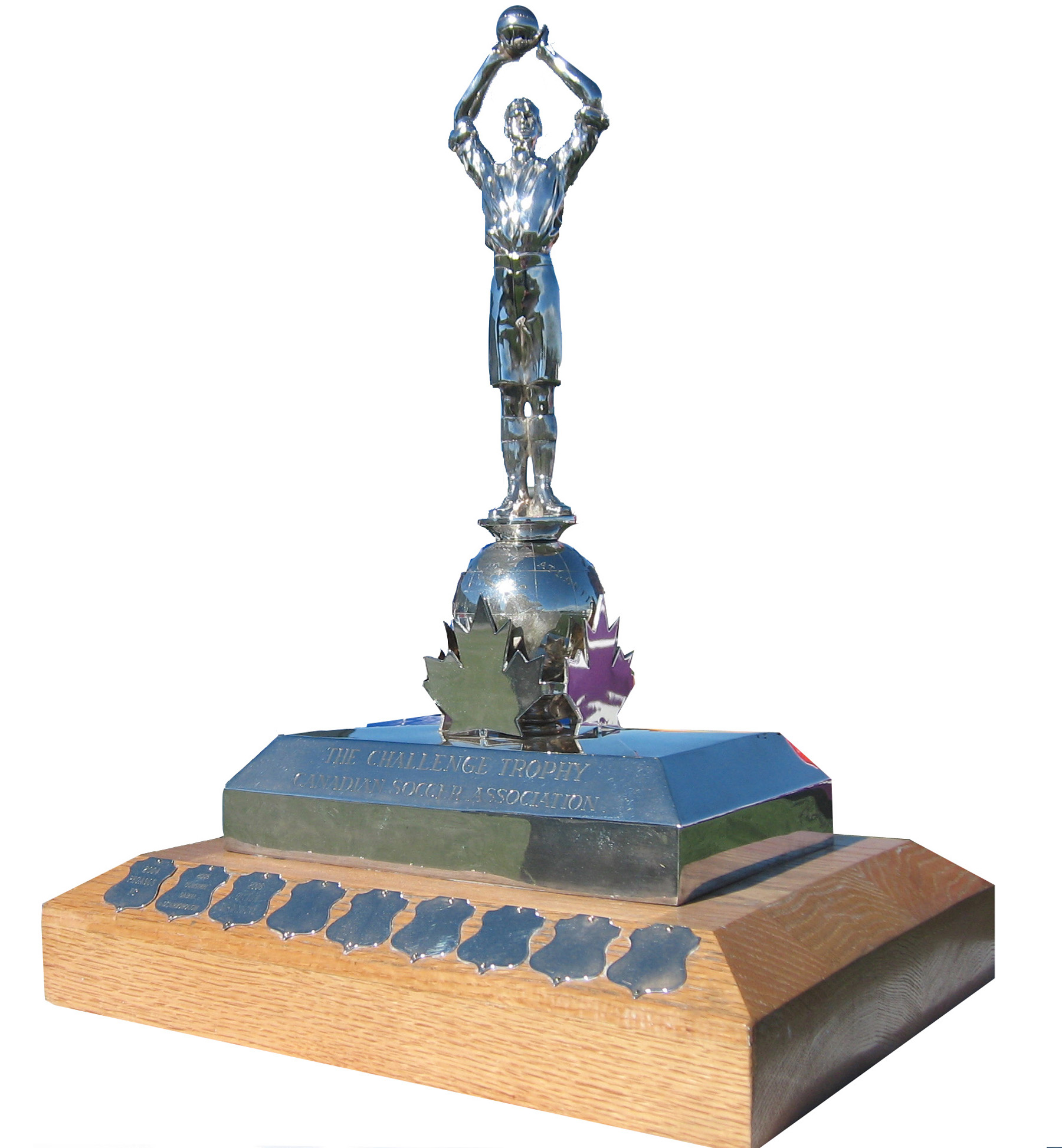
- Founded: 1912
- Region: Canada (CONCACAF)
- Teams: 8–12
- Current champions: Holy Cross FC
- Most championships: Westminster Royals FC (9 titles)
- Broadcaster: Canada Soccer
- Website: canadasoccer.com
- 2025 Challenge Trophy

The Challenge Trophy (French: Trophée Challenge) is the trophy presented to Canada's men's amateur soccer champions as part of Canada Soccer's annual National Championships. The men's competition was created with the inauguration of the Dominion of Canada Football Association in 1912 and the first club winners were presented the Connaught Cup in 1913. The first Challenge Trophy, donated by The Football Association, was presented to the Dominion of Canada Football Championship winners for the first time in 1926 (although at the time the competition was still known as the Connaught Series). The new Challenge Trophy was presented to the men's amateur champions for the first time in 2004.

As part of the same National Championships, the Jubilee Trophy is presented annually to the women's amateur soccer champions. The Jubilee Trophy was first presented in 1982. Other amateur divisions in the National Championships are U-15 and U-17 for each boys and girls.

The National Championships initially featured a round-robin format in 1913 and 1914, then featured a knockout format with a two-leg Final from 1915 to 1927. From there, the Final featured a best-of-three format from 1928 to 1955 and a single-match format from 1956 to present.

More than 20 clubs have won the National Championships men's competition two or more times. Westminster Royals FC are the most successful club with nine Challenge Trophy titles to their credit (1928, 1930, 1931, 1936, 1953, 1955, 1958, 1960, 1973). Since 1963, only amateur clubs have participated in the competition, with notably Montréal Concordia FC the last professional side to win the Challenge Trophy back in 1961.

== Amateur eligibility ==
As Canada Soccer's premier amateur competition, only Canadian citizens, permanent residents or protected persons may compete in the National Championships. Only amateur players (including reinstated amateurs) may compete in the competition and they must be assigned to their respective clubs by 31 August of that year (or an earlier date if stipulated by the province or territory).

== Format and hosts ==
Since 1973, the Challenge Trophy competition has featured a host venue for the final weekend or final week of matches. Regional interprovincial playoffs (before the final matches) continued up until 1998 after which clubs from all Canadian provinces and territories have been eligible to qualify directly into the final week of the competition. Each year, Canada Soccer's provincial and territorial soccer associations determine how clubs from their region qualify for the National Championships. Since 1999, anywhere from eight to 12 clubs have competed in the final week of the competition. While there have sometimes been Quarterfinals and/or Semifinals since 1985, the National Championships format for the final week has generally started with the group phase and ended with the final ranking/standings day which includes a single-match final for gold medals and the Challenge Trophy.

Canadian communities have the opportunity to bid on hosting the National Championships. As explained by Canada Soccer, "events will be organized and executed by Canada Soccer in collaboration with the Local Organizing Committee." Bidders are evaluated across nine different categories: background; support and partnerships; facilities; competition; finance; communication, hosting services & activities; operation organization; legacy; and overall bid presentation.

Once a Host City is selected, the hosts set up a Local Organizing Committee that stages the competition. Canada Soccer remains the "rights holder and has the overall responsibility for these events."

=== Hosts by province (1973 to 2025) ===
Rank	Province	Years Hosted	Host Cities
1	Newfoundland and Labrador	9	St. John's (1973, 1974, 1989, 2002, 2008, 2016, 2019, 2025), St. Lawrence (1977)
2	British Columbia	7	Victoria (1979, 1984), Burnaby (1992), Chilliwack (1999), Surrey (2006, 2017, 2024)
2	Alberta	7	Calgary (1975, 1981, 1997, 2005, 2015), Edmonton (1985, 1994)
4	Saskatchewan	6	Saskatoon (1982, 1988, 1991, 2000, 2009, 2018)
4	Ontario	6	Kitchener (1978), Thunder Bay (1983), Etobicoke (1993), Vaughan (2001, 2014, 2022)
4	Nova Scotia	6	Halifax (1980, 2007, 2013, 2023), Dartmouth (1990), New Minas (1996)
7	Manitoba	4	Winnipeg (1976, 1987, 1995, 2012)
8	Quebec	3	Sherbrooke (1986), Québec (2003), Brossard (2011)
9	Prince Edward Island	2	Charlottetown (2004, 2010)
10	New Brunswick	1	Fredericton (1998)

== History ==
An unofficial Dominion championship for a trophy donated by The People newspaper of London, named the Peoples Shield, was contested from 1906–1912. Teams from all provinces did not enter the competition in each year, and it was contested by Western Canada in its last years.

On May 24, 1912, the Amateur Athletic Union met in Toronto to determine a competition to crown a Canadian national champion. That year, the executive of the Dominion of Canada Football Association invited the Duke of Connaught to become the Patron of the Association. The Duke donated the Connaught Cup to the FA, which became the championship of Canadian soccer. In 1926, the English FA donated a new trophy to replace it as the national championship named the Challenge Trophy.

The inaugural competition in 1913 and the 1914 edition both featured four teams in a league format; both were won by Manitoba side Norwood Wanderers.

In 1927, the previously amateur-only tournament opened to professional teams. Prior to 1940, fifteen finals were played at Carruthers Park in Winnipeg (1923–1939), (roughly halfway across the country) five in Toronto and one each in Vancouver and Montreal.

From 1954 to 1961, the trophy was replaced by the Carling Cup. The original Challenge Trophy is now retired and on display at Canada Soccer House in Ottawa, Ontario.

The tournament acted as a men's national championship at the highest level in Canadian soccer in its early years, however, professional and semi-professional tournaments have taken on more importance in recent decades, including the Canadian Championship.

== Qualifying competitions ==
As outlined in the tournament regulations, "Provincial and Territorial Associations must advise Canada Soccer of its qualified teams" for the National Championships.

Province	Qualification
British Columbia	BC Soccer winners
Alberta	Alberta Cup winners
Saskatchewan	Sask Cup winners
Manitoba	MSA Cup winners
Ontario	Ontario Cup winners
Québec	LS Pro Ligue2 winners
New Brunswick	Soccer New Brunswick Cup winners
Nova Scotia	Soccer Nova Scotia Cup winners
Prince Edward Island	PEI Cup winners (sometimes winners by acclamation)
Newfoundland and Labrador	Newfoundland and Labrador Cup winners

== Medals and trophy ==
The top-three teams at the National Championships Challenge Trophy competition are presented medals while the remaining teams are presented participation banners. Along with their medals, the winning team is presented the Challenge Trophy, although the trophy remains in Canada Soccer's possession.

== Winners ==
=== Winners from 1913 to 1972 ===
Year	Host	Final			Third-place match		
Year	Host	Winner	Score	Runner-up	3rd place	Score	4th place
1913 league	Arena; Fort William, Ontario	Norwood Wanderers; St. Boniface, Manitoba		Lachine	Fort William CPR		Toronto Old Country
1914 league	Winnipeg; Winnipeg, Manitoba	Norwood Wanderers; St. Boniface, Manitoba		Fort William CPR	Toronto Eaton's		Lachine
1915 details	Varsity; Toronto, Ontario	Winnipeg Scottish FC; Winnipeg, Manitoba	0–0; 6–1	Toronto Lancashire FC			
1916–1918	No Competition						
1919 details	National; Westmount; Montreal, Quebec	Montréal Grand Trunk FC; Montreal, Quebec	2–1; 1–0	Winnipeg War Veterans			
1920 details	Harvester; Hamilton, Ontario; Varsity; Toronto, Ontario	Hamilton Westinghouse FC; Hamilton, Ontario	0–0; 2–1	Winnipeg Britannia			
1921 details	Broadview; Island; Toronto, Ontario	Toronto Scottish FC; Toronto, Ontario	3–0; 1–0	Ladysmith FC			
1922 details	Scottish Field; Toronto, Ontario	Calgary Hillhurst FC; Calgary, Alberta	2–1; 0–0	Toronto Ulster United FC			
1923 details	Carruthers Park; Winnipeg, Manitoba	Nanaimo City FC Wanderers; Nanaimo, British Columbia	1–0; 0–1; 1–0	Montréal CPR			
1924 details	Carruthers Park; Winnipeg, Manitoba	United Weston FC; Winnipeg, Manitoba	3–2; 0–0	Beloeil Canadian Explosives			
1925 details	Carruthers Park; Winnipeg, Manitoba	Toronto Ulster United FC; Toronto, Ontario	0–0; 1–1; 2–0	Nanaimo Wanderers			
1926 details	Carruthers Park; Winnipeg, Manitoba	United Weston FC; Winnipeg, Manitoba	0–0; 1–1; 1–1; 1–0	Cumberland Cdn. Collieries			
1927 details	Carruthers Park; Winnipeg, Manitoba	Nanaimo City FC Wanderers; Nanaimo, British Columbia	9–0; 5–1	Fort William Canadian Legion			
1928 details	Carruthers Park; Winnipeg, Manitoba	Westminster Royals FC; New Westminster, British Columbia	3–2; 1–2; 6–1	Montréal CNR			
1929 details	Carruthers Park; Winnipeg, Manitoba	Montréal CNR; Montreal, Quebec	4–0; 5–0	United Weston FC			
1930 details	Carruthers Park; Winnipeg, Manitoba	Westminster Royals FC; New Westminster, British Columbia	1–0; 0–5; 1–0	Montréal CNR			
1931 details	Carruthers Park; Winnipeg, Manitoba	Westminster Royals FC; New Westminster, British Columbia	2–0; 3–0	Toronto Scottish FC			
1932 details	Ulster; Toronto, Ontario	Toronto Scottish FC; Toronto, Ontario	3–0; 2–1	North Shore United FC			
1933 details	Carruthers Park; Winnipeg, Manitoba	Toronto Scottish FC; Toronto, Ontario	2–2; 0–0; 3–0	Prince Albert City Reds			
1934 details	Carruthers Park; Winnipeg, Manitoba	Verdun Park FC; Montreal, Quebec	4–0; 0–2; 4–1	Prince Albert City Reds			
1935 details	Carruthers Park; Winnipeg, Manitoba	Montréal Aldred; Montreal, Quebec	3–2; 3–7; 1–1; 1–0	Nanaimo City FC			
1936 details	Con Jones; Vancouver, British Columbia	Westminster Royals FC; New Westminster, British Columbia	6–1; 1–2; 3–0	United Weston FC			
1937 details	Carruthers Park; Winnipeg, Manitoba	Vancouver Johnston Storage; Vancouver, British Columbia	1–3; 3–1; 3–2	Toronto Ulster United FC			
1938 details	Carruthers Park; Winnipeg, Manitoba	North Shore United FC; Vancouver, British Columbia	1-1; 1-3; 1-0; 2-2; 6–2	Timmins Dome Mines			
1939 details	Carruthers Park; Winnipeg, Manitoba	Vancouver Radials FC; Vancouver, British Columbia	2–2; 2–3; 2–0; 3–1	Montréal Carsteel FC			
1940-1945	No Competition						
1946 details	Broadview; Oakview; Toronto, Ontario	Toronto Ulster United FC; Toronto, Ontario	3–1; 7–1	Fort William Vets			
1947 details	Callister Park; Vancouver, British Columbia	Vancouver St. Andrews FC; Vancouver, British Columbia	5–0; 4–0	Winnipeg Scottish FC			
1948 details	Broadview YMCA; Toronto, Ontario	Montréal Carsteel FC; Montreal, Quebec	4–3; 1–3; 4–3	Vancouver St. Andrews FC			
1949 details	Mewata Stadium; Calgary, Alberta	North Shore United FC; Vancouver, British Columbia	4–0; 1–2; 2–0	Hamilton Westinghouse FC			
1950 details	Callister Park; Vancouver, British Columbia	Vancouver City FC; Vancouver, British Columbia	4–1; 4–0	Winnipeg AN&AF Scottish FC			
1951 details	Wesetmount Athletic Grounds; Montreal, Quebec	Toronto Ulster United FC; Toronto, Ontario	1–1; 2–1; 2–2	Vancouver St. Andrews FC			
1952 details	Osborne; Winnipeg, Manitoba	Montréal Stelco; Montreal, Quebec	2–4; 3–1; 2–0	Westminster Royals FC			
1953 details	Delormier; Montreal, Quebec	Westminster Royals FC; New Westminster, British Columbia	0–0; 2–0; 1–1	Montréal Hakoah			
1954 details	Alexander; Winnipeg, Manitoba	Winnipeg AN&AF Scottish FC; Winnipeg, Manitoba	3–2; 3–0	North Shore United FC			
1955 details	Fred Hamilton; Broadview; Toronto, Ontario	Westminster Royals FC; New Westminster, British Columbia	3–1; 1–1; 2–2	Ukraina Montréal			
1956 details	Callister; Vancouver, British Columbia	Vancouver Hale-Co FC; Vancouver, British Columbia	5–1	Winnipeg Germania FC			
1957 details	Faillon; Montreal, Quebec	Ukraina Montréal; Montreal, Quebec	2–1	North Shore United FC			
1958 details	Callister; Vancouver, British Columbia	Westminster Royals FC; New Westminster, British Columbia	2–0	Winnipeg AN&AF Scottish FC			
1959 details	Fred Hamilton; Toronto, Ontario	Montréal Canadian Alouettes; Montreal, Quebec	3–2	Westminster Royals FC			
1960 details	Empire; Vancouver, British Columbia	Westminster Royals FC; New Westminster, British Columbia	4–0	Toronto Golden Mile			
1961 details	Faillon Stadium; Montreal, Quebec	Montréal Concordia; Montreal, Quebec	1–0	Vancouver Firefighters FC			
1962 details	Alexander; Winnipeg, Manitoba	Winnipeg AN&AF Scottish FC; Winnipeg, Manitoba	6–0	Edmonton Edelweiss			
1963	No Competition						
1964 details	Callister; Vancouver, British Columbia	Vancouver Columbus FC; Vancouver, British Columbia	4–0	Sudbury Italia FC			
1965 details	Oshawa, Ontario	Vancouver Firefighters FC; Vancouver, British Columbia	5–0	Oshawa Italia FC			
1966 details	Alexander Park; Winnipeg, Manitoba	British Columbia Selects; British Columbia	2–0	Québec	Ontario	3–1	Saskatchewan
1967 details	Mewata; Calgary, Alberta	Toronto Ballymena United; Toronto, Ontario	1–0	Calgary Buffalo Kickers			
1968 details	Stanley; Toronto, Ontario	Toronto Royals; Toronto, Ontario	2–1	Vancouver Columbus FC			
1969 details	Swangard; Burnaby, British Columbia	Vancouver Columbus FC; Vancouver, British Columbia	10–0	Montréal Ukraina			
1970 details	Alexander; Winnipeg, Manitoba	Manitoba Selects; Manitoba	2–1	Québec	British Columbia	7–0	Newfoundland Labrador
1971 details	Burnaby; Vancouver, British Columbia	Vancouver Eintracht; Vancouver, British Columbia	3–1	Windsor Maple Leafs			
1972 details	York Stadium; Toronto, Ontario	Westminster Blues; New Westminster, British Columbia	3–0	Toronto San Fili			

=== Winners from 1973 to 2025 ===
Since 1973, Canada Soccer's annual amateur championship has featured one venue for the final week of matches.

Season	Winners	Score	Runners-up	Scorers	MVP	Venue
1973	Vancouver Firefighters FC	2–0	Toronto West Indies United	Louis Trischuk, John Haar		St. John's, Newfoundland; King George V Park
1974	Calgary Springer Kickers	2–1	Windsor SS Italia	Yilmas Atas, Ray Gannon		St. John's, Newfoundland; King George V Park
1975	Victoria London Boxing AC	3–1	St. Lawrence Laurentians			Calgary, Alberta; Mewata Stadium
1976	Victoria West FC	3–2	Winnipeg Fort Rouge			Winnipeg, Manitoba; Alexander Park
1977	Vancouver Columbus FC	1–0	St. Lawrence Laurentians			St. Lawrence, Newfoundland; Centennial
1978	Vancouver Columbus FC	3–1	Montréal Elio Blues			Kitchener, Ontario; Memorial
1979	Victoria West FC	6–2	LaSalle Olympique SC			Victoria, British Columbia; Royal Athletic Park
1980	Saint John Dry Dock Islanders	3–2	Ottawa Maple Leaf Almrausch			Halifax, Nova Scotia; St. Mary's
1981	North York Ciociaro SC	2–1	Calgary Springer Kickers	Tony Desousa, Angelo Gabrielli		Calgary, Alberta; Glenmore Park
1982	Victoria West FC	4–0	Saskatoon United SC			Saskatoon, Saskatchewan
1983	Vancouver Firefighters FC	2–1	CNSC Windsor Croatia			Thunder Bay, Ontario; Fort William Stadium
1984	Victoria West FC	1–0	Hamilton Dundas United			Victoria, British Columbia; Royal Athletic Park
1985	Croatia SC Vancouver	1–0	Montréal Elio Blues			Edmonton, Alberta; Clarke Field
1986	Hamilton Steelers	1–0	Croatia SC Vancouver			Sherbrooke, Quebec, Quebec; Rock Forest Park
1987 details	Winnipeg Lucania SC	1–0	New Westminster QPR	Kevin Methot		Winnipeg, Manitoba; University of Manitoba
1988 details	Holy Cross FC	2–0	Edmonton Ital Canadians SC			Saskatoon, Saskatchewan; Umea West
1989	Scarborough Azzurri SC	3–2	Holy Cross FC			St. John's, Newfoundland; King George V Park
1990	Vancouver Firefighters FC	1–0	Dartmouth United			Dartmouth, Nova Scotia; Beazley Field
1991	NorVan ANAF	2–2(a.e.t.); 4–2 (p)	Scarborough Azzurri SC			Saskatoon, Saskatchewan
1992	NorVan ANAF	1–0	Edmonton Scottish SC			Burnaby, British Columbia; Swangard Stadium
1993	Vancouver Westside FC	1–0	Calommiers Longueuil			Etobicoke, Ontario; Centennial Stadium
1994	Edmonton Ital Canadians SC	1–0	Scarborough Azzurri SC			Edmonton, Alberta; Victoria Soccer
1995	Mistral Estrie	1–0	Halifax King of Donair			Winnipeg, Manitoba; Winnipeg Sports Complex
1996	Vancouver Westside FC	2–1	Cosmos LaSalle	John Catliff (2)	John Catliff	New Minas, Nova Scotia; Lockhart Ryan Memorial Park
1997	Edmonton Ital Canadians SC	3–1	North Shore Pegasus			Calgary, Alberta; Calgary Soccer Centre
1998	Rivière-des-Prairies	1–0	Hamilton Serbian			Fredericton, New Brunswick; Chapman
1999	Calgary Celtic SFC	1–0	Coquitlam Metro-Ford SC			Chilliwack, British Columbia; Townsend Park
2000	Winnipeg Lucania SC	2–0	Vancouver Westside FC			Saskatoon, Saskatchewan; Umea East
2001	Halifax King of Donair	4–1	Victoria Gorge FC			Vaughan, Ontario; Vaughan Grove
2002	Winnipeg Sons of Italy	1–0 (a.e.t.)	St. Lawrence Laurentians			St. John's, Newfoundland
2003	Calgary Callies	1–1 (a.e.t.); 4–2 (p)	Panellinios Montréal FC			Quebec City, Quebec; Patro
2004 details	Surrey Pegasus FC	0–0 (a.e.t.); 4–3 (p)	Ottawa Royals	No goals		Charlottetown, Prince Edward Island; UPEI
2005 details	Scarborough GS United	3–2	Edmonton Green & Gold	Emil Calixeirio, Tom Kouzmanis, Sultan Haitham		Calgary, Alberta; Broadview Park
2006 details	Ottawa St. Anthony	1–0	Calgary Callies			Surrey, British Columbia; Newton Athletic Park
2007 details	Calgary Callies	5–0	Vancouver Columbus FC	Mark Slade (3), Cenek Patik, Nicky Reyes		Halifax, Nova Scotia; Mainland Commons
2008 details	Calgary Callies	3–1	Corfinium de St-Léonard	Nicky Reyes, Mark Slade, Steffen Holdt		St. John's, Newfoundland; King George V Park
2009 details	Winnipeg Hellas SC	1–0	Royal-Sélect Beauport	Chris Musto		Saskatoon, Saskatchewan; SaskTel Field House
2010 details	Charlottetown Abbies SC	2–0	Victoria Gorge FC	Brett Norton, Ryan Anstey		Charlottetown, Prince Edward Island; UPEI
2011 details	Saskatoon HUSA Alumni	2–0	Surrey ICST Pegasus	Nathan Reis, Mitchell Collins		Brossard, Quebec; Illinois
2012 details	Royal-Sélect Beauport	3–3; 4–2 (p)	Edmonton Scottish SC	Samuel Georget 47', Nafi Raynauld-Dicko 51', Vincent Barrette 77'	Samuel Georget	Winnipeg, Manitoba; Winnipeg Sports Complex
2013 details	Gloucester Celtic FC	3–0	Surrey United Firefighters	Ryne Gulliver 59', 67', Alex Walker 62'	Tom MacDonald	Halifax, Nova Scotia; Mainland Commons
2014 details	London Marconi	0–0 (a.e.t.); 4–2 (p)	Calgary Callies	No goals	Denver Spearman	Vaughan, Ontario; Ontario Soccer Centre
2015 details	London Marconi	2–1 (a.e.t.)	Edmonton Scottish SC	Jovan Ivanovich (2)	Jovan Ivanovich	Calgary, Alberta; AT
2016 details	Edmonton Scottish SC	1–0	Royal-Sélect Beauport	Steven Wheeler	Paul Hamilton	St. John's, Newfoundland; King George V Park
2017 details	Western Halifax FC	1–0	FC Winnipeg Lions	Calum MacRae	Jhonnatan Cordoba	Surrey, British Columbia; Newton Athletic Park
2018 details	Surrey BC Tigers Hurricanes	7–3	Caledon SC	Nick Soolsma (4), Ryan Dhillon (2), Pavi Dhillon	Nick Soolsma	Saskatoon, Saskatchewan; Umea Field
2019 details	Surrey Central City Breakers	2–0	Ottawa St. Anthony SC	Caleb Clarke, Milad Mehrabi	Bobby Jhutty	St. John's, Newfoundland; King George V Park
2022 details	Gloucester Celtic FC	2–0	Edmonton Green & Gold	Kieran Sanders, Andrew Bryan	Bezick Evraire	Vaughan, Ontario; North Maple
2023	West Ottawa SC	1–0	Western Halifax FC	Zach El Shafei 41'	Javane Henry	Halifax, Nova Scotia; Mainland Commons
2024	Gloucester Celtic FC	1–0	Suburban FC			Surrey, British Columbia
2025	Holy Cross FC	1–1; 5–3 (p)	Gloucester Celtic FC			St. John's, Newfoundland; King George V Park
2026	Gloucester Celtic FC	3–1	ICSF Columbus FC	Gloucester: Joey Kewin 5', Christopher Malekos 29', Luca Piccioli 45+2'; Columbus: Matteo Polisi 65'		Ottawa, Ontario; Julian de Guzman Park

== Titles ==
=== By provincial association (1913 to 2025) ===
Rank	Province	Titles	Years
1	British Columbia	41	1923, 1927, 1928, 1930, 1931, 1936, 1937, 1938, 1939, 1947, 1949, 1950, 1953, 1955, 1956, 1958, 1960, 1964, 1965, 1966, 1969, 1971, 1972, 1973, 1975, 1976, 1977, 1978, 1979, 1982, 1983, 1984, 1985, 1990, 1991, 1992, 1993, 1996, 2004, 2018, 2019
2	Ontario	20	1920, 1921, 1925, 1932, 1933, 1946, 1951, 1967, 1968, 1981, 1986, 1989, 2005, 2006, 2013, 2014, 2015, 2022, 2023, 2024
3	Manitoba	12	1913, 1914, 1915, 1924, 1926, 1954, 1962, 1970, 1987, 2000, 2002, 2009
3	Quebec	12	1919, 1929, 1934, 1935, 1948, 1952, 1957, 1959, 1961, 1995, 1998, 2012
5	Alberta	9	1922, 1974, 1994, 1997, 1999, 2003, 2007, 2008, 2016
6	Newfoundland and Labrador	2	1988, 2025
6	Nova Scotia	2	2001, 2017
8	New Brunswick	1	1980
8	Prince Edward Island	1	2010
8	Saskatchewan	1	2011

=== All-time winners and runners up (1913 to 2025) ===
Rank	Club	Champions	Winning years	Runners up	Years as Runners Up
1	Westminster Royals FC	9	1928, 1930, 1931, 1936, 1953, 1955, 1958, 1960, 1972	2	1952, 1959
2	Vancouver Columbus FC	4	1964, 1969, 1977, 1978	2	1968, 2007
2	Victoria West FC	4	1976, 1979, 1982, 1984	0	
2	Vancouver Firefighters FC	4	1965, 1973, 1983, 1990	1	1961
2	Calgary Celtic SFC / Calgary Caledonian FC	4	1999, 2003, 2007, 2008	2	2006, 2014
6	Toronto Scottish FC	3	1921, 1932, 1933	1	1931
6	Toronto Ulster United FC	3	1925, 1946, 1951	2	1922, 1937
6	Winnipeg Scottish FC / Winnipeg AN&AF Scottish FC	3	1915, 1954, 1962	3	1947, 1950, 1958
6	Gloucester Celtic FC	3	2013, 2022, 2024	1	2025
10	Norwood Wanderers FC of St. Boniface	2	1913, 1914	0	
10	United Weston FC	2	1924, 1926	2	1929, 1936
10	Nanaimo City FC Wanderers	2	1923, 1927	2	1925, 1935
10	Montréal Grand Trunk FC / Canadian National Railway	2	1919, 1929	2	1928, 1930
10	North Shore United FC	2	1938, 1949	3	1932, 1954, 1957
10	Vancouver City FC / Vancouver Hale-Co FC	2	1950, 1956	0	
10	Montréal Canadian Alouettes / Montréal Concordia	2	1959, 1961	0	
10	NorVan ANAF	2	1991, 1992	0	
10	Vancouver Westside FC	2	1993, 1996	1	2000
10	Edmonton Ital Canadians SC	2	1994, 1997	1	1988
10	Winnipeg Lucania SC	2	1987, 2000	0	
10	London Marconi	2	2014, 2015	0	
10	St. John's Holy Cross FC	2	1988, 2025	1	1989
23	Hamilton Westinghouse FC	1	1920	1	1949
23	Calgary Hillhurst FC	1	1922	0	
23	Verdun Park FC	1	1934	0	
23	Montréal Aldred FC	1	1935	0	
23	Vancouver Johnston National Storage FC	1	1937	0	
23	Vancouver Radials FC	1	1939	0	
23	Vancouver St. Andrews FC	1	1947	2	1948, 1951
23	Montréal Carsteel FC	1	1948	1	1939
23	Montréal Stelco	1	1952	0	
23	SA Ukraina Montréal	1	1957	2	1955, 1969
23	British Columbia Selects	1	1966	0	
23	Toronto Ballymena United FC	1	1967	0	
23	Toronto Royals FC	1	1968	0	
23	Manitoba Selects	1	1970	0	
23	Eintracht SC Vancouver	1	1971	0	
23	Calgary Kickers / Springer Kickers	1	1974	2	1967, 1981
23	Victoria London Boxing AC / Victoria Athletics	1	1975	0	
23	Saint John Drydock Islanders	1	1980	0	
23	North York Ciociaro SC	1	1981	0	
23	Croatia SC Vancouver	1	1985	1	1986
23	Hamilton Steelers SC	1	1986	0	
23	Scarborough Azzurri SC	1	1989	2	1991, 1994
23	Mistral Estrie	1	1995	0	
23	CS Rivière-des-Prairies	1	1998	0	
23	Halifax King of Donair	1	2001	1	1995
23	Winnipeg Sons of Italy / FC Winnipeg Lions	1	2002	1	2017
23	Surrey Pegasus FC / Surrey ICST Pegasus	1	2004	1	2011
23	Scarborough GS United	1	2005	0	
23	Ottawa St. Anthony	1	2006	1	2019
23	Winnipeg Hellas SC	1	2009	0	
23	Charlottetown Abbies SC / PEI FC	1	2010	0	
23	Saskatoon HUSA Alumni	1	2011	0	
23	Royal-Sélect Beauport	1	2012	2	2009, 2016
23	Edmonton Scottish SC	1	2016	3	1992, 2012, 2015
23	Western Halifax FC	1	2017	1	2023
23	Surrey BC Tigers Hurricanes	1	2018	0	
23	Surrey Central City Breakers FC / Surrey BB5 United	1	2019	0	
23	West Ottawa SC	1	2023	0	
62	Lachine			1	1913
62	Fort William CPR			1	1914
62	Toronto Lancashire FC			1	1915
62	Winnipeg Great War Veterans			1	1919
62	Hamilton Brittania			1	1920
62	Ladysmith FC			1	1921
62	Montréal CPR			1	1923
62	Beloeil Canadian Explosives			1	1924
62	Cumberland FC			1	1926
62	Fort William Legion			1	1927
62	Prince Albert City Reds			2	1933, 1934
62	Timmins Dome Mines			1	1938
62	Fort William Army, Navy & Air Force			1	1946
62	Montréal Hakoah			1	1953
62	Winnipeg FC Germania			1	1956
62	SC Golden Mile Toronto			1	1960
62	Edmonton Edelweiss			1	1962
62	Sudbury Italia FC			1	1964
62	Oshawa Italia FC			1	1965
62	Équipe du Québec			1	1966, 1970
62	Windsor Maple Leafs			1	1971
62	Toronto San Fili SC			1	1972
62	West Indies United Toronto			1	1973
62	Windsor SS Italia			1	1974
62	St. Lawrence Laurentians			3	1975, 1977, 2002
62	Winnipeg Fort Rouge			1	1976
62	Montréal Elio Blues			2	1978, 1985
62	LaSalle Olympique SC			1	1979
62	Ottawa Maple Leaf Almrausch			1	1980
62	Saskatoon United SC			1	1982
62	CNSC Windsor Croatia			1	1983
62	Hamilton Dundas United			1	1984
62	New Westminster QPR			1	1987
62	Dartmouth United			1	1990
62	Calommiers Longueuil			1	1993
62	Cosmos LaSalle			1	1996
62	North Shore Pegasus			1	1997
62	Hamilton Serbian			1	1998
62	Coquitlam Metro-Ford SC			1	1999
62	Victoria Gorge FC			2	2001, 2010
62	Panellinios Montréal FC			1	2003
62	Ottawa Royals			1	2004
62	Edmonton Green & Gold			2	2005, 2022
62	Corfinium St-Léonard			1	2008
62	Surrey United Firefighters			1	2013
62	Caledon SC			1	2018
62	Suburban FC			1	2024

== See also ==
- Soccer in Canada
- History of the Canadian Soccer Association
- List of soccer clubs in Canada
