= Canada soccer national championships =

Canadian amateur soccer tournament

Canada Soccer's National Championships
- Founded: 1913
- Region: Canada (CONCACAF)
- Broadcaster: CanadaSoccerTV
- Website: canadasoccer.com

Canada Soccer's National Championships, is an annual amateur soccer competition in Canada. The multi-division competition is hosted in three venues each October: the open-age adult competitions (men's Challenge Trophy and women's Jubilee Trophy); the U-17 Cup competition for boys and girls; and the U-15 Cup competition for boys and girls.

The men's competition was originally known as the Dominion of Canada Football Championship when it was inaugurated in 1913 (winners were presented the Connaught Cup). Over time, different divisions have been added, starting with the Youth Championship in 1966. The women's championship was added in 1982.

== Amateur eligibility ==
As Canada Soccer's premier amateur competition, only Canadian citizens, permanent residents or protected persons may compete in the National Championships. Only amateur players (including reinstated amateurs) may compete in the competition and they must be assigned to their respective clubs by August 31 of that year (or an earlier date if stipulated by the province or territory).

== Host cities ==
Canadian communities have the opportunity to bid on hosting the National Championships. As explained by Canada Soccer, "events will be organized and executed by Canada Soccer in collaboration with the Local Organizing Committee." Bidders are evaluated across nine different categories: Background; Support and partnerships; Facilities; Competition; Finance; Communication, hosting services & activities; Operation Organization; Legacy; and Overall Bid Presentation.

Once a Host City is selected, the hosts set up a Local Organizing Committee that stages the competition. Canada Soccer remains the "rights holder and has the overall responsibility for these events."

=== Youth Cup Hosts ===
Season	U-15/U-14 Cups	U-17/U-16 Cups	U-19/U-18 Cups
1984	Dorval; Quebec; U-14 Cup	Calgary; Alberta; U-16 Cup	North York; Ontario; U-18 Cup
1985	Richmond; British Columbia; U-14 Cup	Ottawa; Ontario; U-16 Cup	Sydney; Nova Scotia; U-18 Cup
1986	Oshawa; Ontario; U-14 Cup	Saint John; New Brunswick; U-16 Cup	Saskatoon; Saskatchewan; U-18 Cup
1987	Calgary; Alberta; U-14 Cup	St. John's; Newfoundland and Labrador; U-16 Cup	Ottawa; Ontario; U-18 Cup
1988	Richmond; British Columbia; U-14 Cup	Ottawa; Ontario; U-16 Cup	Kirkland; Quebec; U-18 Cup
1989	Ottawa; Ontario; U-14 Cup	Dartmouth; Nova Scotia; U-16 Cup	Edmonton; Alberta; U-18 Cup
1990	Edmonton; Alberta; U-14 Cup	St. John's; Newfoundland and Labrador; U-16 Cup	Ottawa; Ontario; U-18 Cup
1991	Ottawa; Ontario; U-14 Cup	Edmonton; Alberta; U-16 Cup	Dartmouth; Nova Scotia; U-18 Cup
1992	Calgary; Alberta; U-14 Cup	Winnipeg; Manitoba; U-16 Cup	Saint John; New Brunswick; U-18 Cup
1993	Québec; Quebec; U-14 Cup	Winnipeg; Manitoba; U-16 Cup	Edmonton; Alberta; U-18 Cup
1994	Etobicoke; Ontario; U-14 Cup	Saskatoon; Saskatchewan; U-16 Cup	Halifax; Nova Scotia; U-18 Cup
1995	Charlottetown; Prince Edward Island; U-14 Cup	Saskatoon; Saskatchewan; U-16 Cup	Etobicoke; Ontario; U-18 Cup
1996	Etobicoke; Ontario; U-15 Cup	St. John's; Newfoundland and Labrador; U-17 Cup	Edmonton; Alberta; U-19 Cup
1997	Charlottetown; Prince Edward Island; U-15 Cup	Richmond; British Columbia; U-17 Cup	Brossard; Quebec; U-19 Cup
1998	Prince Albert; Saskatchewan; U-15 Cup	Vaughan; Ontario; U-17 Cup	Saint-Jean-sur-Richelieu; Quebec; U-19 Cup
1999	Edmonton; Alberta; U-15 Cup	Charlottetown; Prince Edward Island; U-17 Cup	Etobicoke; Ontario; U-19 Cup
2000	Etobicoke; Ontario; U-15 Cup	St. John's; Newfoundland and Labrador; U-17 Cup	Burnaby; British Columbia; U-19 Cup
2001	Lachine; Quebec; U-14 Cup	Edmonton; Alberta; U-16 Cup	Charlottetown; Prince Edward Island; U-18 Cup
2002	Etobicoke; Ontario; U-14 Cup	Calgary; Alberta; U-16 Cup	Kelowna; British Columbia; U-18 Cup
2003	Lachine; Quebec; U-14 Cup	Edmonton; Alberta; U-16 Cup	Charlottetown; Prince Edward Island; U-18 Cup
2004	Halifax; Nova Scotia; U-14 Cup	Surrey; British Columbia; U-16 Cup	Winnipeg; Manitoba; U-18 Cup
2005	Moncton; New Brunswick; U-14 Cup	Mount Pearl; Newfoundland and Labrador; U-16 Cup	Sydney; Nova Scotia; U-18 Cup
2006	Vaughan; Ontario; U-14 Cup	Saint John; New Brunswick; U-16 Cup	Laval; Quebec; U-18 Cup
2007	St. John's; Newfoundland and Labrador; U-14 Cup	Sherwood Park; Alberta; U-16 Cup	Fredericton; New Brunswick; U-18 Cup
2008	Sydney; Nova Scotia; U-14 Cup	Vaughan; Ontario; U-16 Cup	Charlottetown; Prince Edward Island; U-18 Cup
2009	Winnipeg; Manitoba; U-14 Cup	Sherwood Park; Alberta; U-16 Cup	Sydney; Nova Scotia; U-18 Cup
2010	Moncton; New Brunswick; U-14 Cup	Vaughan; Ontario; U-16 Cup	Mount Pearl; Newfoundland and Labrador; U-18 Cup
2011	Mount Pearl; Newfoundland and Labrador; U-14 Cup	Lethbridge; Alberta; U-16 Cup	Fredericton; New Brunswick; U-18 Cup
2012	Vaughan; Ontario; U-14 Cup	Charlottetown; Prince Edward Island; U-16 Cup	Sydney; Nova Scotia; U-18 Cup
2013	Lethbridge; Alberta; U-14 Cup	Kamloops; British Columbia; U-16 Cup	Mount Pearl; Newfoundland and Labrador; U-18 Cup
2014	Charlottetown; Prince Edward Island; U-14 Cup	Mount Pearl; Newfoundland and Labrador; U-16 Cup	Surrey; British Columbia; U-18 Cup
2015	St. John's; Newfoundland and Labrador; U-14 Cup	Surrey; British Columbia; U-16 Cup	Charlottetown; Prince Edward Island; U-18 Cup
2016	Moncton; New Brunswick; U-14 Cup	Lethbridge; Alberta; U-16 Cup	Vaughan; Ontario; U-18 Cup
2017	Calgary; Alberta; U-15 Cup	Fredericton; New Brunswick; U-17 Cup	
2018	Laval; Quebec; U-15 Cup	Surrey; British Columbia; U-17 Cup	
2019	Edmonton; Alberta; U-15 Cup	Charlottetown; Prince Edward Island; U-17 Cup	
2022	Charlottetown; Prince Edward Island; U-15 Cup	Surrey, British Columbia; British Columbia; U-17 Cup	
2023	Waterloo; Ontario; U-15 Cup	Moncton; New Brunswick; U-17 Cup	
2024	Quinte West; Ontario; U-15 Cup	Cape Breton; Nova Scotia; U-17 Cup	
2025	Charlottetown; Prince Edward Island; U-15 Cup	Kamloops; British Columbia; U-17 Cup	

== National championships ==
Since 2017, Canada Soccer has featured six active divisions at the National Championships.

=== Active Divisions - Adult Amateur Championships ===
Division	Seasons
Men's Challenge Trophy (Previously Connaught Cup Series)	1913 to present
Women's Jubilee Trophy	1982 to present

=== Active Divisions - Youth Championships ===
Division	Seasons
Boys U-17 Cup	1993 to 2000 / 2017 to present
Girls U-17 Cup	1993 to 2000 / 2017 to present
Boys U-15 Cup	1993 to 2000 / 2017 to present
Girls U-15 Cup	1993 to 2000 / 2017 to present

=== Retired Divisions - Youth Championships (Club Football) ===
Division	Seasons
Boys U-18 Cup (Previous: Youth Championship)	1966 to 1992 / 2001 to 2016
Boys U-16 Cup	1973 to 1992 / 2001 to 2016
Boys U-14 Cup	1973 to 1992 / 2001 to 2016
Girls U-19 Cup	1993 to 2000
Girls U-18 Cup	1978 to 1992 / 2001 to 2016
Girls U-16 Cup	1978 to 1992 / 2001 to 2016
Girls U-14 Cup	1978 to 1992 / 2001 to 2016

=== Retired Divisions - All-Star Selects ===
Division	Seasons
Men's Schreyer Cup	1979 to 1982
Boys U-18 All-Stars	1972 to 1987 / 1998 to 1999
Boys U-17 All-Stars	1988 to 1997 / 2000 to 2003
Boys U-16 All-Stars	2004 to 2013
Boys U-15 All-Stars	1975 to 2003 / 2011 to 2013
Boys U-14 All-Stars	2004 to 2010
Women’s All-Star Championship	1986 to 1987
Girls U-19 All-Stars	1990 to 1996 / 1999
Girls U-18 All-Stars	1998
Girls U-17 All-Stars	1999 to 2003
Girls U-16 All-Stars	2004 to 2013
Girls U-15 All-Stars	1998 / 2000 to 2003 / 2011 to 2013
Girls U-14 All-Stars	2004 to 2010

== Other amateur competitions ==
=== Canada Games Soccer Tournaments ===
Youth competitions organized each four years by Canada Games, in conjunction with Canada Soccer, featuring provincial and territorial all-star teams.

Division	Seasons
Men's Tournament (Youth)	1969 to present
Women's Tournament (Youth)	1993 to present

=== University & College Soccer Championships ===
University and college competitions organized each year by U Sports and the Canadian Collegiate Athletic Association.

Division	Seasons
U Sports Men's Soccer (Previous: CIAU or CIS)	1972 to present
U Sports Women's Soccer (Previous: CIAU or CIS)	1987 to present
CCAA Men's Soccer	1983 to present
CCAA Women's Soccer	1991 to present

=== Futsal Canadian Championship ===
Adult amateur futsal competition organized each year by Canada Soccer.

Division	Seasons
Men's Futsal	2015 to present
Women's Futsal	2023 to present

== See also ==
- Men's Amateur Champions for the Challenge Trophy
- Women's Amateur Champions for the Jubilee Trophy
