= 2026 Premier Soccer Leagues Canada season =

Premier Soccer Leagues Canada
- Season: 2026

Men's soccer
- Alberta PL: Edmonton BTB SC
- British Columbia PL: Langley United
- Ontario PL: Scrosoppi FC
- LS Pro (Quebec): FC Laval
- Prairies PL: Thunder Bay Chill

Women's soccer
- Alberta PL: Calgary Wild FC U23
- British Columbia PL: Vancouver Rise FC Academy
- Ontario PL: Simcoe County Rovers FC
- LS Pro (Quebec): A.S. Blainville
- Prairies PL: Bonivital Flames

The 2026 Premier Soccer Leagues Canada season was the fifth edition of Premier Soccer Leagues Canada (PSLC), the 3rd division of soccer in Canada. It included league competitions from its five member leagues, with some league winners advancing to the men's and women's Canadian Championship.

== Changes from 2025 ==
The 2026 season was the first PSLC season to include a fifth regional league, following the establishment of the Prairies Premier League (PPL) in Manitoba, Saskatchewan, and Northern Ontario. It was also the first season of the PSLC following the renaming from League1 Canada in January 2026.

Four of the five men's league champions qualified for the 2027 Canadian Championship; the inaugural PPL champions were not invited. Additionally, the Women's Inter-Provincial Championship was discontinued and replaced with the W Canadian Championship; the 2026–27 W Canadian Championship featured the winner and runner up of the 2025 Inter-Provincial Championship as well as the six teams of the Northern Super League.

== Men's competitions ==
Alberta Premier League
British Columbia Premier League
LS Pro – Ligue1

Pos	Team	Pld	Pts
1	Edmonton BTB SC (C)	14	37
2	Calgary Blizzard SC	14	36
3	Calgary Foothills FC	14	26
4	Cavalry FC II	14	22
5	St. Albert Impact	14	20
6	Calgary Villains FC	14	8
7	Calgary Rangers SC	14	6
8	Callies United	14	5

Source: APL
(C) Champions

Pos	Team	Pld	Pts
1	Langley United (C)	14	35
2	TSS Rovers FC	14	32
3	Whitecaps FC Academy	14	22
4	Nanaimo United FC	14	18
5	Altitude FC	14	18
6	Burnaby FC	14	16
7	Kamloops United FC	14	9
8	Unity FC	14	8

Source: BCPL
(C) Champions

Pos	Team	Pld	Pts
1	FC Laval (C)	22	47
2	CS Saint-Laurent	22	45
3	Ottawa South United	22	35
4	AS Laval	22	34
5	Royal-Sélect de Beauport	22	33
6	AS Gatineau	22	31
7	AS Blainville	22	29
8	CS LaSalle	22	25
9	Celtix du Haut-Richelieu	22	24
10	CS St-Hubert	22	23
11	CS Longueuil (R)	22	23
12	CS Mont-Royal Outremont (R)	22	17

Source: LS Pro
(C) Champions; (R) Relegated
Ontario Premier League 1
Prairies Premier League

Pos	Team	Pld	Pts
1	Scrosoppi FC (C)	22	51
2	Woodbridge Strikers	22	50
3	Oakville SC	22	41
4	Vaughan Azzurri	22	41
5	Unionville Milliken SC	22	37
6	Sigma FC	22	29
7	Burlington SC	22	28
8	North Toronto Nitros	22	28
9	St. Catharines Roma Wolves	22	23
10	International FC	22	20
11	Sudbury Cyclones (R)	22	18
12	Simcoe County Rovers FC (R)	22	4

Source: OPL
(C) Champions; (R) Relegated

Pos	Team	Pld	Pts
1	Thunder Bay Chill (C)	10	21
2	Queen City United SC	10	18
3	Bonivital Flames	10	15
4	Saskatchewan EXCEL	10	15
5	FC Manitoba	10	13
6	Forza Soccer Academy	10	1

Source: PPL
(C) Champions

== Women's competitions ==
Alberta Premier League
British Columbia Premier League
LS Pro Féminin – Ligue1

Pos	Team	Pld	Pts
1	Calgary Wild FC U23 (C)	14	34
2	Calgary Foothills FC	14	27
3	Calgary Blizzard SC	14	27
4	Edmonton BTB SC	14	25
5	St. Albert Impact	14	23
6	Calgary Rangers SC	14	10
7	Calgary Villains FC	14	9
8	Callies United	14	3

Source: APL
(C) Champions

Pos	Team	Pld	Pts
1	Vancouver Rise FC Academy (C)	14	39
2	Altitude FC	14	32
3	Langley United	14	24
4	TSS Rovers FC	14	21
5	Unity FC	14	19
6	Kamloops United FC	14	11
7	Burnaby FC	14	10
8	Nanaimo United FC	14	4

Source: BCPL
(C) Champions

Pos	Team	Pld	Pts
1	A.S. Blainville (C)	16	37
2	CS Mont-Royal Outremont	16	32
3	Royal-Sélect de Beauport	16	30
4	CF Montréal Academy	16	23
5	AS Chaudière-Ouest	16	21
6	Celtix du Haut-Richelieu	16	19
7	CS Longueuil	16	24
8	FC Laval	16	19
9	Ottawa South United	16	18
10	Lakeshore SC	16	14
11	CS Saint-Laurent (R)	16	11
12	AS Laval (R)	16	11

Source: LS Pro
(C) Champions; (R) Relegated
Ontario Premier League 1
Prairies Premier League

Pos	Team	Pld	Pts
1	Simcoe County Rovers FC (C)	18	50
2	NDC Ontario	18	38
3	Guelph United FC	18	37
4	Vaughan Azzurri	18	28
5	FC London	18	26
6	Scrosoppi FC	18	25
7	Woodbridge Strikers	18	21
8	Waterloo United	18	20
9	North Toronto Nitros	18	14
10	North Mississauga SC (R)	18	0

Source: OPL
(C) Champions; (R) Relegated

Pos	Team	Pld	Pts
1	Bonivital Flames (C)	10	20
2	FC Manitoba	10	17
3	Thunder Bay Chill	10	15
4	Saskatchewan EXCEL	10	12
5	Queen City United SC	10	10
6	Winnipeg Lucania FC	10	9

Source: PPL
(C) Champions
