= List of soccer clubs in Canada =

This is a list of current soccer clubs in Canada. The Canadian soccer system consists of several unconnected leagues and it does not have promotion and relegation. Leagues in the Canadian system are classified as either professional, pro-am, or amateur. The Canadian Soccer Association (CSA) is the governing body for the sport in Canada and directly sanctions leagues that operate in more than one province. Leagues operating in a single province receive sanctioning from their provincial soccer association.

== Clubs competing in the United States ==
The following are clubs that compete in professional and semi-professional leagues in the United States as of 2025.

Club	Home city	Stadium	Founded	Season joined
Major League Soccer
CF Montréal (Note: Played as Montreal Impact until the end of the 2020 MLS season.)	Montreal, Quebec	Saputo Stadium	1993 (Note: MLS franchise granted in 2010.)	2012
Toronto FC	Toronto, Ontario	BMO Field	2005	2007
Vancouver Whitecaps FC	Vancouver, British Columbia	BC Place	1974 (Note: MLS franchise granted in 2009.)	2011
MLS Next Pro
Toronto FC II	Toronto, Ontario	York Lions Stadium	2014	2022
Whitecaps FC 2	Burnaby, British Columbia	Swangard Stadium	2021	2022

== Canadian Premier League ==
=== 2026 CPL teams ===
Club	Home city	Stadium	Finishing position in 2026	Season joined
Atlético Ottawa	Ottawa, Ontario	TD Place Stadium	3rd	2020
Cavalry FC	Foothills County, Alberta	ATCO Field	1st	2019
Forge FC	Hamilton, Ontario	Hamilton Stadium	2nd	2019
HFX Wanderers FC	Halifax, Nova Scotia	Wanderers Grounds	7th	2019
Inter Toronto FC (Note: Played as York9 FC 2019–2020 and York United FC 2021–2025.)	Toronto, Ontario	York Lions Stadium	6th	2019
Pacific FC	Langford, British Columbia	Starlight Stadium	8th	2019
FC Supra du Québec	Laval, Quebec	Stade Boréale	4th	2026
Vancouver FC	Langley, British Columbia	Willoughby Stadium	5th	2023

== Premier Soccer Leagues Canada ==
=== Alberta Premier League ===
Men's division
Team	City	Principal stadium	First season
Edmonton BTB SC	Edmonton	Clarke Stadium	2023
Calgary Blizzard SC	Calgary	Broadview Park	2024
Calgary Foothills FC	Calgary	Macron Performance Centre	2023
Calgary Rangers SC	Calgary	Webber Athletic Park	2025
Calgary Villains FC	Calgary	Villains Dome	2025
Callies United	Calgary	Calgary West Soccer Centre	2024
Cavalry FC II (Note: Cavalry FC II was known as Cavalry FC U21 from 2023 to 2024)	Foothills County	Shouldice Athletic Park	2023
St. Albert Impact	St. Albert	Riel Recreation Park	2023

=== British Columbia Premier League ===
Team	City	Stadium	First season
Altitude FC	North Vancouver	Kinsmen Field South	2022
Burnaby FC	Burnaby	Burnaby Lake Sports Complex West	2024
Langley United	Langley	Willoughby Community Park	2025
Kamloops United FC (Note: Kamloops United FC was known as Rivers FC from 2022 to 2024)	Kamloops	Hillside Stadium	2022
Nanaimo United FC (Note: Nanaimo United FC was known as Harbourside FC from 2023 to 2024)	Nanaimo	Q'unq'inuqwstuxw Stadium	2023
TSS Rovers FC	Burnaby	Swangard Stadium	2022
Unity FC	Surrey	Cloverdale Athletic Park	2022
Whitecaps FC Academy	Vancouver (UBC Campus) (Note: Based on the campus of the University of British Columbia. The campus is part of the unincorporated Metro Vancouver Electoral Area A and is located just west of the City of Vancouver proper.)	Thunderbird Stadium	2022

=== Ontario Premier League ===
Team	City	Stadium	Capacity	Founded	Debut
Current teams
International FC	Vaughan	Zanchin Automotive Soccer Centre	2,200	2009	2026
Burlington SC	Burlington	Corpus Christi CSS		1962	2022
FC London	London	Tricar Field	900	2008	2016
North Toronto Nitros	Toronto	Downsview Park	1,000	1980	2016 (Note: North Toronto Nitros was on hiatus in 2018 & 2019, and returned in 2020)
Oakville SC (Note: Oakville SC operated as Oakville Blue Devils FC until the 2021 season and Blue Devils FC between the 2021 and 2024 season prior to their merger)	Oakville	Bronte Athletic Park	500	1972	2015
Scrosoppi FC	Milton	Saint Francis Xavier CSS		2020	2021
Sigma FC	Mississauga	Mississauga Sports and Entertainment Centre/Hamilton Stadium	5,400	2005	2014
Simcoe County Rovers FC	Barrie	J.C. Massie Field	1,200	2021	2022
St. Catharines Roma Wolves	St. Catharines	Club Roma Stadium	1,500	1967	2021
Vaughan Azzurri	Vaughan	North Maple Regional Park	500	1982	2014
Woodbridge Strikers	Woodbridge	Vaughan Grove Park	1,000	1976	2014

=== Prairies Premier League ===
Men's division
Team	City	Principal stadium	First season
Saskatchewan EXCEL			2026
Forza Soccer Academy			2026
Queen City United SC	Regina		2026
FC Manitoba	Winnipeg	Ralph Cantafio Soccer Complex	2026
Bonivital Flames	Winnipeg		2026
Winnipeg Lucania FC	Winnipeg		2026
Thunder Bay Chill	Thunder Bay	Chapples Park Stadium	2026

=== Ligue1 Quebec ===
Team	City	Stadium	Joined
Current teams
A.S. Blainville	Blainville, Laurentides	Parc Blainville	2012
Celtix du Haut-Richelieu	Saint-Jean-sur-Richelieu, Montérégie	Parc Pierre-Benoît	2020
AS Laval (Note: AS Laval was known as CS Monteuil until the 2021 season)	Laval	Parc de Lausanne	2019
FC Laval (Note: FC Laval was known as CS Fabrose until the 2020 season)	Laval	Parc Berthiaume-Du Tremblay	2018
CS Longueuil	Longueuil, Montérégie	Parc Laurier	2014
CS Mont-Royal Outremont	Mount Royal, Montréal	Parc Recreatif de TMR	2013
CS Saint-Laurent	Saint-Laurent, Montreal	Stade Claude-Robillard	2022
CS St-Hubert	Saint-Hubert, Montérégie	Centre Sportif Roseanne-Laflamme	2017
Ottawa South United	Ottawa, Ontario	TAAG Park (Carleton University)	2020
Royal-Sélect de Beauport	Quebec City	Stade Beauport	2021
CS LaSalle	Montréal		2025
AS Gatineau	Gatineau, Outaouais		2025

== See also ==
- List of Canadian soccer clubs in American leagues
