= Mosaic Stadium =

Football stadium in Regina, Saskatchewan

- New Mosaic Stadium; Mosaic Stadium II
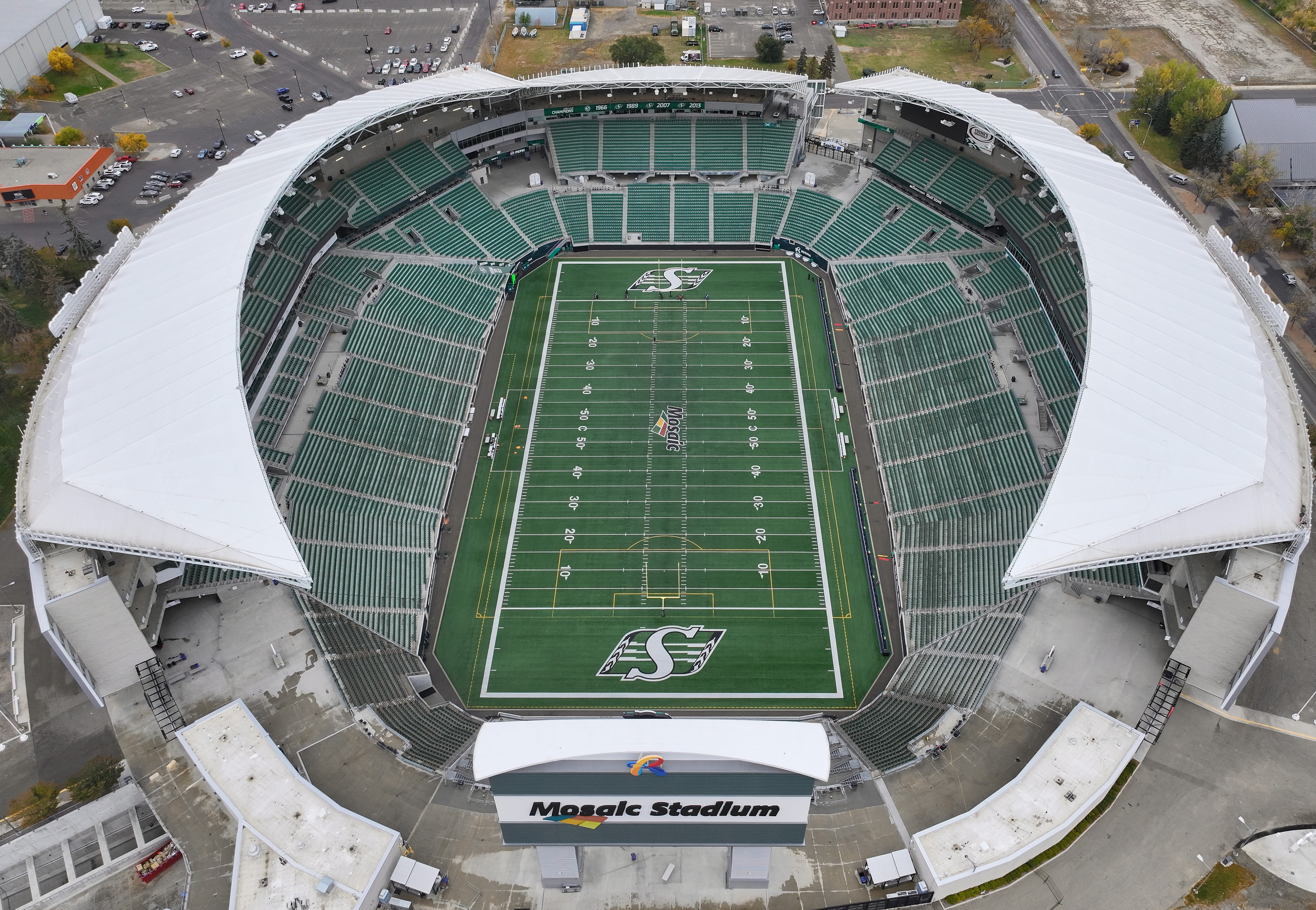
- Mosaic Stadium in 2025

- Location in Saskatchewan Location in Canada
- Location: 1734 George Reed Way, Regina, SK
- Coordinates: 50°27′02″N 104°37′59″W
- Owner: City of Regina
- Operator: Regina Exhibition Association Ltd.
- Capacity: 33,350 (expandable to 40,000)
- Executive suites: 38
- Surface: FieldTurf Revolution 360
- Record attendance: 34,352 (Sept 6, 2026 vs Winnipeg Blue Bombers); 39,500 (Aug 9 or 10, 2019, The Garth Brooks Stadium Tour - estimated)

Construction
- Groundbreaking: June 16, 2014
- Opened: July 1, 2017
- Cost: $278 million
- Architects: HKS (Sports and Lead Design Architect), and B+H Architects (Architect of Record), Mott MacDonald and Pattern Design (Pre-design services)
- Project managers: ZW Group and PC Sports
- General contractor: PCL Construction

Tenants
- Saskatchewan Roughriders (CFL) (2017–present); Regina Rams (U Sports) (2016–present); Regina Thunder (CJFL) (2017–present); Regina Riot (WWCFL) (2017–present); Regina High School Football

Mosaic Stadium is an open-air stadium at REAL District in Regina, Saskatchewan. Announced on July 12, 2012, the stadium replaced Taylor Field as the home field of the Canadian Football League's Saskatchewan Roughriders. It was designed by HKS, Inc., in joint venture with B+H, the architects of record. Preliminary construction on the new stadium began in early 2014, and it was declared "substantially complete" on August 31, 2016. The stadium is owned by the city of Regina and operated by the Regina Exhibition Association Ltd. (REAL).

The stadium soft opened with a university football game between the Regina Rams and the Saskatchewan Huskies on October 1, 2016. The Roughriders moved into the stadium for the 2017 CFL season. It hosted the 2019 NHL Heritage Classic and the 109th Grey Cup in 2022.

== History ==
On July 12, 2012 during a pre-game ceremony, Saskatchewan Premier Brad Wall and Regina mayor Pat Fiacco announced the signing of a memorandum of understanding for the funding of a new stadium to house the Saskatchewan Roughriders to replace Mosaic Stadium at Taylor Field. The Riders had played at least part-time at the site of Taylor Field since 1921, and had moved there full-time after a permanent stadium was built there in 1936. The stadium was slated for construction at Evraz Place, Regina's exhibition grounds, sharing its site with Regina's indoor arena Brandt Centre. The project was officially approved by the Regina City Council in January 2013.

The new stadium serves as an aspect of the Regina Revitalization Initiative, a redevelopment project which will also see the former site of Taylor Field redeveloped into a residential area, and the re-location of the Canadian Pacific Railway's downtown yard to the Global Transportation Hub project on the west end of Regina to allow for further downtown development.

On March 14, 2014, it was announced that PCL Construction had won the bid to lead the construction of the new stadium, and that it would be designed by HKS, Inc.—a firm recently known for their work on AT&T Stadium and Lucas Oil Stadium. The official design of the new stadium was unveiled on May 22, 2014. It was also announced that The Mosaic Company, which held naming rights to the previous stadium, would renew its naming rights to cover the new stadium under a 20-year deal. As such, the new stadium will also be known as Mosaic Stadium.

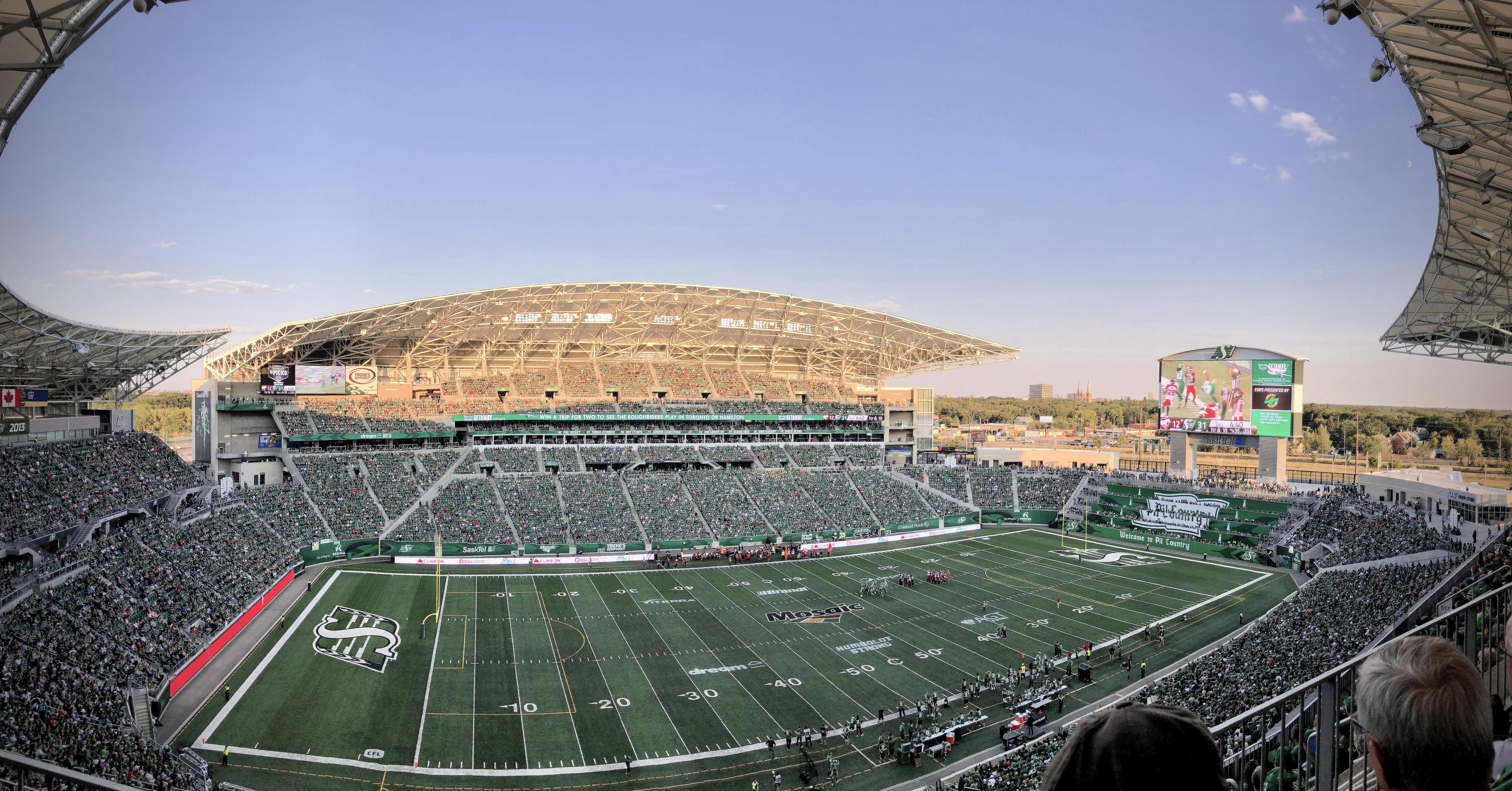
Regular season Riders game in 2018.

Preliminary excavation of the stadium site began in April 2014, and an official groundbreaking ceremony was held on June 16, 2014. The new stadium was scheduled to be completed by August 2016, and the Roughriders were to officially move into the facility for the 2017 season. Installation of the stadium's FieldTurf Revolution 360 playing surface began in July 2016; it is the first CFL stadium to feature this iteration of FieldTurf. On August 31, 2016, officials declared Mosaic Stadium to be "substantially complete", with furniture, concessions, and other fixtures still being finished.

The city stated that at least three test events would be held at Mosaic Stadium before the Roughriders' inaugural season at the facility; the first was a Regina Rams/Saskatchewan Huskies university football game on October 1, 2016. Only the lower bowl was utilized, capping capacity at 16,500. The second test event, Regina Rocks Mosaic Stadium, was held on May 27, 2017, headlined by Bryan Adams. The stadium was capped at 75% of its capacity for this event. The Riders hosted their first game at the new Mosaic Stadium, a pre-season game against the Winnipeg Blue Bombers, on June 10, 2017.

In November 2019, a stretch of 10th Avenue along the north end of the stadium was renamed George Reed Way, in honour of retired Roughriders player George Reed. The stadium's official address was also changed to 1734 George Reed Way, in reference to his #34 jersey.

As part of scheduled maintenance, the city is installing a new playing surface in Mosaic Stadium ahead of the 2027 CFL season. In November 2026, it was reported that the city plans to permanently stitch field markings for CFL football and soccer into the new surface rather than paint them. The proposal was met with criticism, since the permanent markings would make it difficult for high school and university football teams to play at Mosaic Stadium due to the CFL's new shorter field dimensions for the 2027 season. Mayor Chad Bachynski stated that repainting the field would reduce community access and increase costs (projected to be $200,000 upfront for required equipment, and an additional $7,000 for each repainting), and that "If the CFL believes this is the preferred approach, it should be prepared to financially contribute to those additional costs, operating impacts and lost revenues." The city stated that the new playing surface would be able to accommodate 97% of existing bookings, provided that Football Canada amends its rules to allow use of the CFL's 100-yard field. CFL commissioner Stewart Johnston responded to the mayor's proposal, stating that "painting is not that difficult and I think painting futureproofs your field."

== Design ==
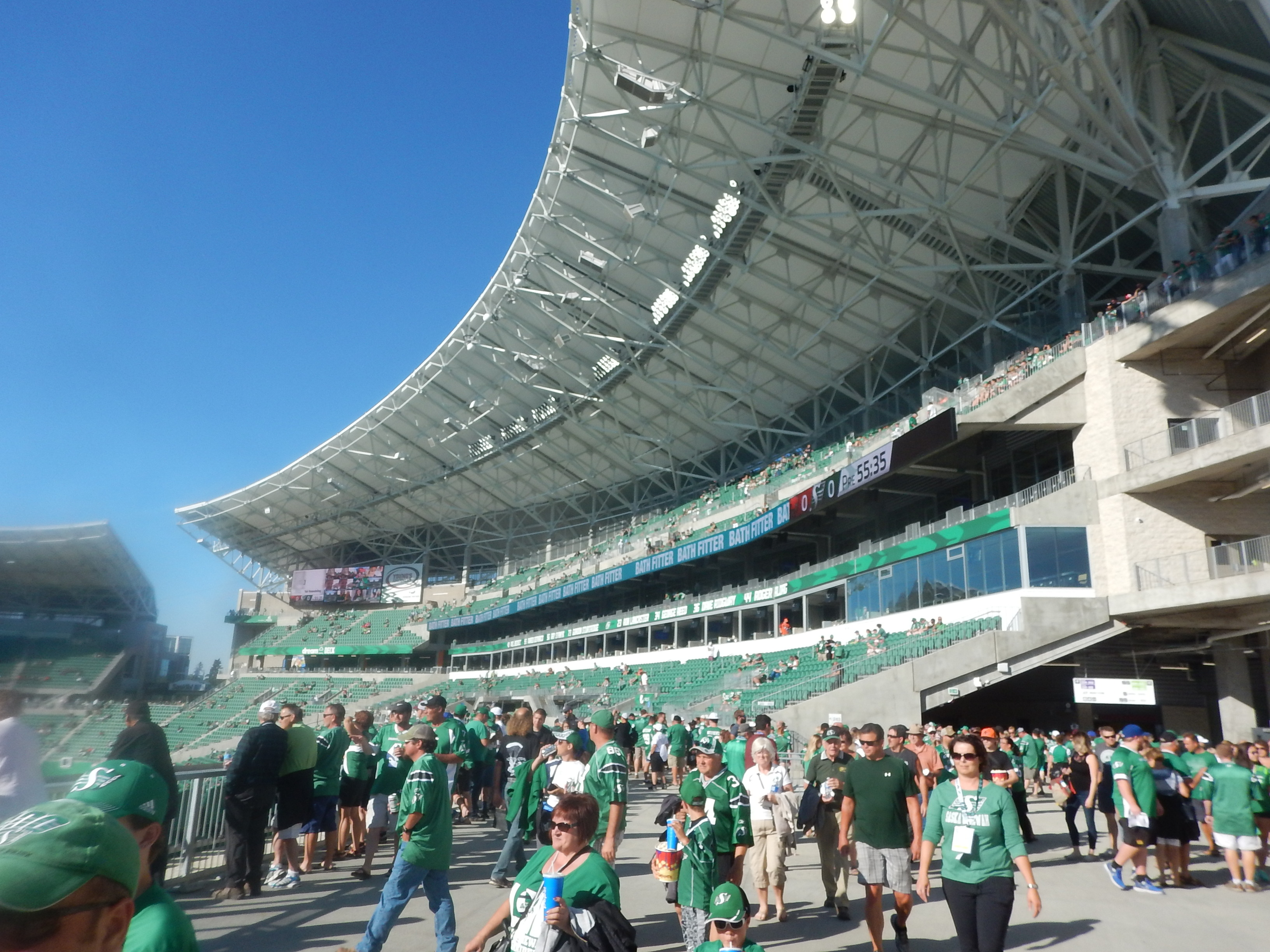
Interior and grandstand.

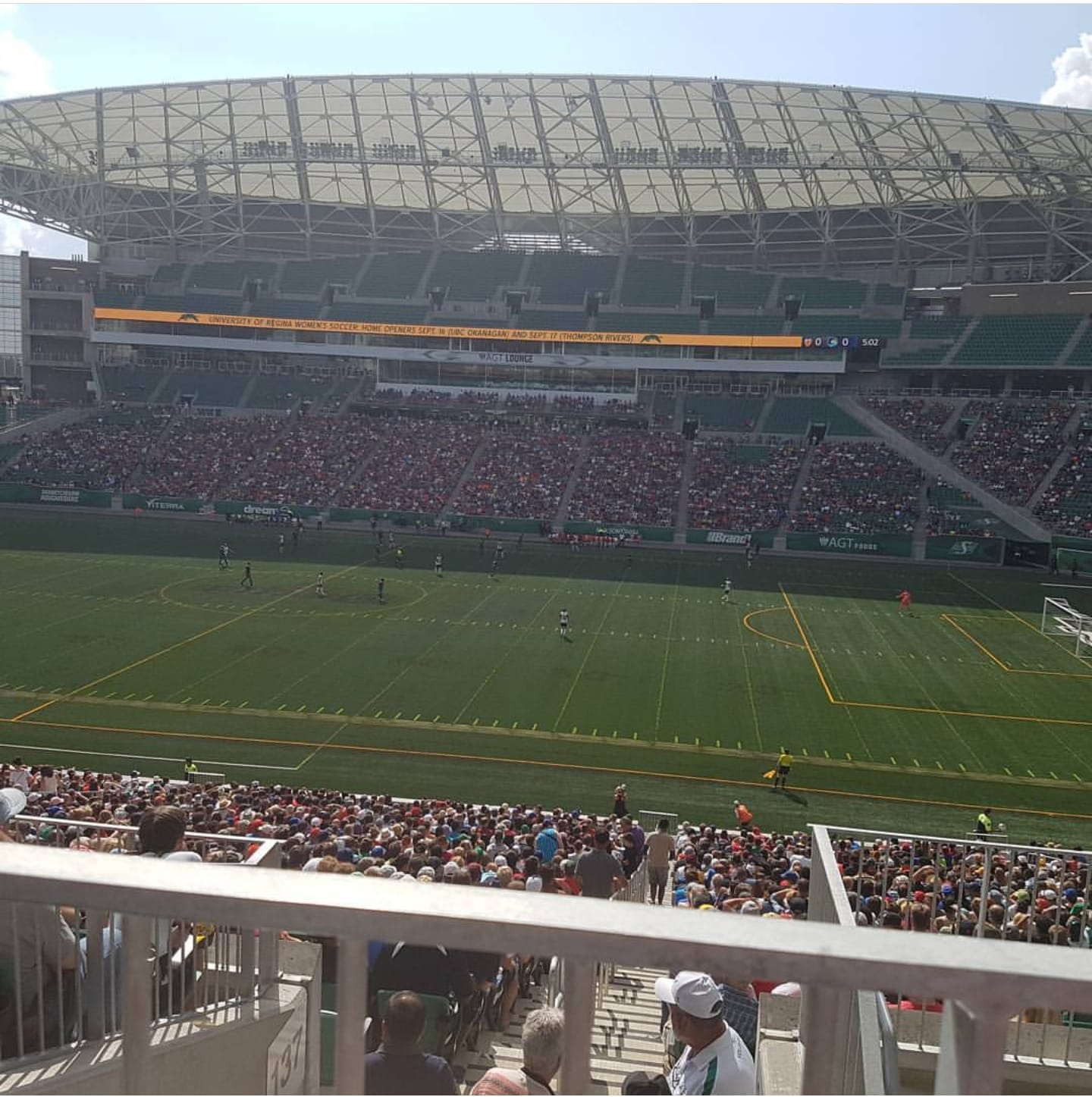
Mosaic Stadium during a soccer game.

The stadium is intended to provide a more modern fan experience in comparison to Taylor Field, utilizing a sunken bowl with a partial roof around much of its rim, designed to shield spectators. The rim's curved design is meant to prevent snow from accumulating on the roof. The stadium was built to support the construction of a full roof in the future. To protect spectators from winds which predominantly come from the north and west, the lower bowl is situated 10 metres (33 ft) below ground level and the upper deck surrounds the entire north end zone. Thirty-eight corporate suites and two levels of luxury seating are also provided. The stadium features an open concourse, circling the entire facility.

Below the concourse of the south end zone, which is not covered by either the roof or the upper deck, are five standing-room tiers branded as "Pil Country" (as part of a sponsorship by Pilsner), with bars running across their length. The section is by general admission and limited to attendees of legal drinking age (19 in Saskatchewan).

Statues honouring Roughriders players Ron Lancaster and George Reed were erected at the west end of the stadium site.

== Budget ==
Mosaic Stadium was estimated to cost around $278 million to build. Funding would be provided by multiple sources; the government of Saskatchewan provided a grant of $80 million, and a $100 million loan being paid off through a $12 surcharge on all Roughriders tickets. The city provided $73 million in funding, which will be subsidized through property tax increases. The remainder of the budget was covered by the Roughriders themselves, primarily through naming rights. In May 2018, the Regina Exhibition Association's president disclosed that additional surcharges may be introduced for concert tickets in the future.

As part of its 2022–23 provincial budget, the Saskatchewan government ended the provincial sales tax exemption for sports and entertainment tickets beginning October 1, 2022.

== Accessibility and transportation ==
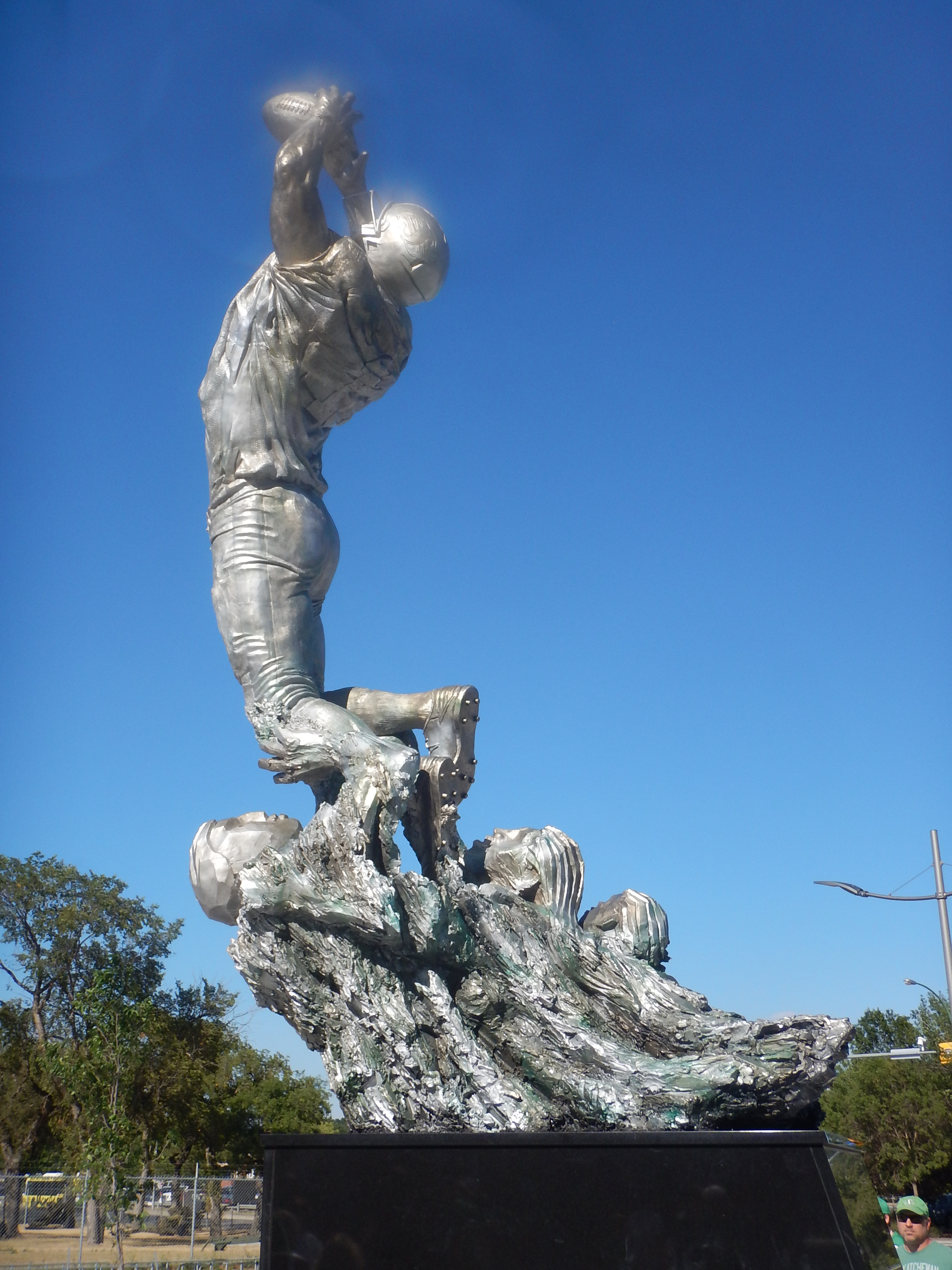
A white bronze statue of a Roughrider receiving a pass, supported by fans at the base, is located on the stadium grounds

Regina Transit offers free shuttle bus and parking service to and from Mosaic Stadium for Roughriders games and other major events, with drop-off points including Northgate Mall, Southland Mall, the University of Regina, two downtown locations and three locations in the Warehouse District. In 2018, Normanview Crossing dropped out of the program, as its businesses objected to the site's parking lots being wasted by its users. The site was replaced by a third downtown pickup location near the former Sears outlet store on Broad Street, which was criticized for removing coverage of the service from the city's northwest neighbourhoods. In 2019, Victoria Square Mall was replaced by the University of Regina campus.

== Notable events ==
=== Football ===
- On November 20, 2022, Mosaic Stadium hosted the 109th Grey Cup between the Toronto Argonauts and Winnipeg Blue Bombers.

=== Concerts ===
- On May 27, 2017, the stadium hosted its second major test event, Regina Rocks Mosaic Stadium, a concert headlined by Bryan Adams.
- Guns N' Roses played Mosaic Stadium on the Not in This Lifetime... Tour on August 27, 2017.
- Eagles played Mosaic Stadium on May 17, 2018, as part of their North American tour, scheduled as part of festivities for the 2018 Memorial Cup (hosted by the Regina Pats at nearby Brandt Centre).
- Garth Brooks played two shows of The Garth Brooks Stadium Tour at Mosaic Stadium on August 9 and 10, 2019.
- Foo Fighters are scheduled to play a show on September 15, 2026, as part of the Take Cover Tour.

=== Hockey ===
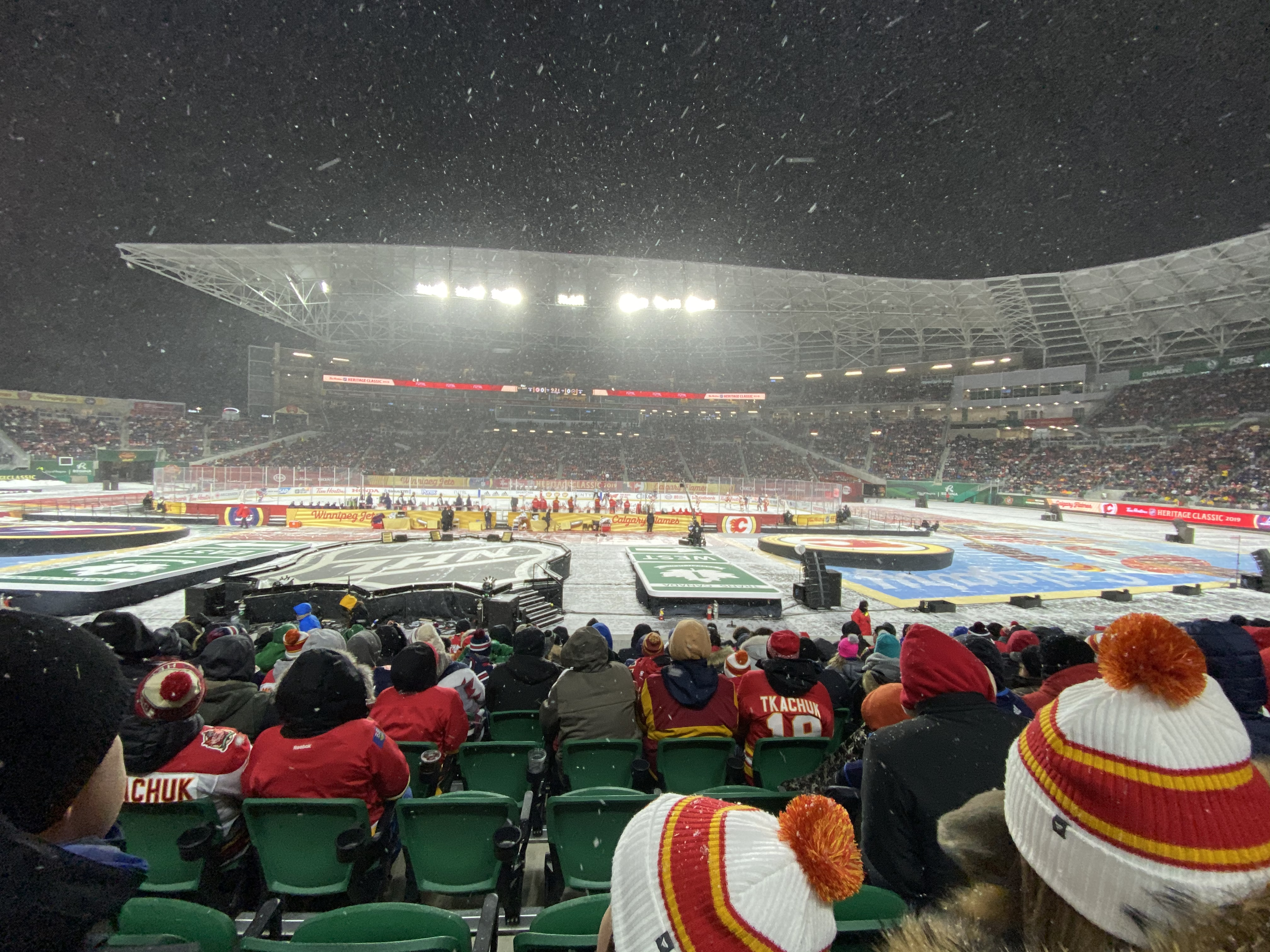
Mosaic Stadium during the 2019 NHL Heritage Classic.

- On October 26, 2019, Mosaic Stadium hosted the 2019 NHL Heritage Classic, featuring the Winnipeg Jets and Calgary Flames. The Regina Pats hosted the Calgary Hitmen in a Western Hockey League (WHL) game the next day, the Prairie Classic. The Pats had originally planned to host an outdoor game against the Moose Jaw Warriors in February 2018 as part of their centennial season. However, due to slow ticket sales and weather concerns, the outdoor games were cancelled and moved back to Brandt Centre.

=== Soccer ===
- Valencia CF of La Liga and the New York Cosmos of the North American Soccer League hosted an international friendly at Mosaic Stadium on July 22, 2017. The match was played as part of Soccer Day in Saskatchewan, which also included a women's university soccer match between the Regina Cougars and Saskatchewan Huskies.
- In 2017, Mosaic Stadium was listed as one of nine possible Canadian venues in United 2026, a joint U.S.-led bid to hold portions of the 2026 FIFA World Cup in Canada and Mexico. However, Regina did not make the shortlist of 32.
- On August 3, 2022, the stadium hosted an exhibition match between under-23 sides of Sunderland A.F.C. and Toronto FC.
- In late May and early July 2026, Mosaic Stadium will be used as the home stadium by Queen City United SC of the Prairies Premier League in the league's inaugural season.
