= 2026 in Canadian soccer =

Soccer in Canada
- Season: 2026

Men's soccer
- CPL Shield: Cavalry FC
- Supporters' Shield: (United States) Nashville SC (Note: Vancouver Whitecaps FC was the best Canadian club in the Supporters' Shield standings.)
- Premier Soccer Leagues: Edmonton BTB (APL); Langley United (BCPL); FC Laval (LS Pro); Scrosoppi FC (OPL); Thunder Bay Chill (PPL)
- Canadian Championship: Forge FC
- Challenge Trophy: Gloucester Celtic

Women's soccer
- Premier Soccer Leagues: Calgary Wild U23 (APL); Vancouver Rise Academy (BCPL); A.S. Blainville (LS Pro); Simcoe County Rovers (OPL); Bonivital Flames (PPL)
- Jubilee Trophy: Coquitlam Metro-Ford

The following are events related to Canadian soccer in the year 2026.

== National team events ==
=== Men's national team matches ===
March 28, 2026 Friendly	Canada	2–2	Iceland	Toronto, Ontario
13:00 UTC−4	J. David 67' (pen.), 76' (pen.); Buchanan (red card) 80'	Report	Óskarsson 9', 21'; Þorsteinsson (yellow card) 35'; Anderson (yellow card) 80'	Stadium: BMO Field; Attendance: 26,328; Referee: Jon Freemon (United States)

March 31, 2026 Friendly	Canada	0–0	Tunisia	Toronto, Ontario
21:00 UTC−4	Oluwaseyi (yellow card) 29'; Waterman (yellow card) 53'; Millar (yellow card) 74'; Hoilett (yellow card) 90+2'	Report	Saad (yellow card) 28'; Ayari (yellow card) 46'	Stadium: BMO Field; Attendance: 22,624; Referee: Keylor Herrera (Costa Rica)
Note: The match was postponed by 90 minutes due to a lightning delay.

June 1, 2026 Friendly	Canada	2–0	Uzbekistan	Edmonton, Alberta
19:00 UTC−6	Millar (yellow card) 40'; Cornelius (yellow card) 43'; Osorio 58'; Nelson 90+1'	Report	Ganiev (yellow card) 2'; Sayfiev (yellow card) 9'	Stadium: Commonwealth Stadium; Attendance: 46,164; Referee: Marco Ortíz (Mexico)

June 5, 2026 Friendly	Canada	1–1	Republic of Ireland	Montreal, Quebec
19:45 UTC−4	O'Brien 23' (o.g.); Cornelius (yellow card) 47'; Larin (yellow card) 57'	Report	Parrott (penalty missed) 60'; Ogbene 60'; McGrath (yellow card) 64'	Stadium: Saputo Stadium; Attendance: 19,619; Referee: Pablo Camacho (Costa Rica)

June 12, 2026 2026 World Cup GS	Canada	1–1	Bosnia and Herzegovina	Toronto, Ontario
15:00 UTC−4	Johnston (yellow card) 11'; De Fougerolles (yellow card) 53'; Larin 78'	Report	Lukić 21', (yellow card) 45+1'; Demirović (yellow card) 44'; Katić (yellow card) 90+3'	Stadium: BMO Field; Attendance: 43,002; Referee: Facundo Torres (Argentina)

June 18, 2026 2026 World Cup GS	Canada	6–0	Qatar	Vancouver, British Columbia
15:00 UTC−7	Cornelius (yellow card) 9'; Larin 16'; J. David 29', 45+3', 90+2'; Saliba 64'; Manai 75' (o.g.)	Report	Ahmed (red card) 33'; Madibo (red card) 51'; Fathy (yellow card) 62'	Stadium: BC Place; Attendance: 52,497; Referee: Cristián Garay (Chile)

June 24, 2026 2026 World Cup GS	Switzerland	2–1	Canada	Vancouver, British Columbia
12:00 UTC−7	Xhaka (yellow card) 32'; Vargas 46'; Manzambi 57'	Report	Larin (yellow card) 32'; P. David 76'; Millar (yellow card) 87'	Stadium: BC Place; Attendance: 52,497; Referee: Ramon Abatti (Brazil)

June 28, 2026 2026 World Cup R32	South Africa	0–1	Canada	Inglewood, California, United States
12:00 UTC−7		Report	Saliba (yellow card) 54'; Sigur (yellow card) 67'; Eustáquio 90+2'	Stadium: SoFi Stadium; Attendance: 69,237; Referee: João Pinheiro (Portugal)

July 4, 2026 2026 World Cup R16	Canada	0–3	Morocco	Houston, Texas, United States
12:00 UTC−5	Laryea (yellow card) 40'; J. David (yellow card) 43'; De Fougerolles (yellow card) 49'; Larin (yellow card) 67'	Report	Halhal (yellow card) 20'; Hakimi (yellow card) 40'; Ounahi (yellow card) 45', (goal) 50', 82'; El Khannouss (yellow card) 45+6'; Rahimi 90+8'	Stadium: NRG Stadium; Attendance: 68,777; Referee: Michael Oliver (England)

September 26, 2026 Friendly	Canada	1–0	Chile	Toronto, Ontario
19:00 UTC−4	J. David 12'; Larin (yellow card) 72'; Knight-Lebel (yellow card) 81'; P. David (yellow card) 90+3'	Report	Suazo (yellow card) 29' (yellow-red card) 49'; Cepeda (red card) 35'	Stadium: BMO Field; Attendance: 23,310; Referee: Marco Ortíz (Mexico)

October 3, 2026 Friendly	Canada	2–0	Peru	Montreal, Quebec
14:00 UTC−4	Shaffelburg 19', 35'; Laryea (yellow card) 90'	Report	Garcés (yellow card) 82'; Lapadula (yellow card) 90'	Stadium: Saputo Stadium; Attendance: 19,619; Referee: Jon Freemon (United States)

October 6, 2026 Friendly	United States	1–0	Canada	Saint Paul, Minnesota, United States
19:00 UTC−5	Ellis 29'; Reyna (yellow card) 41'; Tillman (yellow card) 72'	Report	Oluwaseyi (yellow card) 31'; J. David (yellow card) 58'	Stadium: Allianz Field; Attendance: 19,182; Referee: Steven Madrigal (Costa Rica)

November 13, 2026 2026–27 Nations League QF	Guatemala	v	Canada	Guatemala City, Guatemala
20:00 UTC−6		Report		Stadium: Estadio Manuel Felipe Carrera

November 16, 2026 2026–27 Nations League QF	Canada	v	Guatemala	Toronto, Ontario
20:00 UTC−5		Report		Stadium: BMO Field

=== Women's national team matches ===
March 1 2026 SheBelieves Cup	Canada	4–1	Colombia	Nashville, United States
14:00 ET	Gilles 31'; Sonis 67'; Collins 73'; Prince 90'	Report	Santos 81' (pen.); (yellow card) 64' (yellow-red card) 83' Robledo	Stadium: Geodis Park; Referee: Katja Koroleva (United States)

March 4 2026 SheBelieves Cup	United States	1–0	Canada	Columbus, United States
18:45 ET	Sentnor 55'	Report		Stadium: ScottsMiracle-Gro Field; Referee: Lizzet García (Mexico)

March 7 2026 SheBelieves Cup	Canada	0–0 (3–2 p)	Argentina	Harrison, United States
12:30 ET		Report		Stadium: Sports Illustrated Stadium; Referee: Alyssa Pennington (United States)
	Penalties
	Huitema (penalty missed); Fleming (penalty scored); Sonis (penalty scored); Grosso (penalty scored)		(penalty missed) Cometti; (penalty missed) Braun; (penalty scored) Holzeier; (penalty scored) Vargas; (penalty missed) Preininger

April 11 2026 FIFA Series	Canada	4–0	Zambia	Cuiabá, Brazil
15:30 ET	Prince 41', 45+2'; Chukwu 80', 88'	Report (FIFA)		Stadium: Arena Pantanal; Referee: Emikar Calderas (Venezuela)

April 14 2026 FIFA Series	Canada	3–1	South Korea	Cuiabá, Brazil
15:30 ET	Viens 23'; Gilles 50', 70'	Report (FIFA)	Kim Shin-ji 29'	Stadium: Arena Pantanal

April 18 2026 FIFA Series	Brazil	1–0	Canada	Cuiabá, Brazil
21:30 ET	Gomes 47'	Report (FIFA)		Stadium: Arena Pantanal

June 9 Friendly	Costa Rica	0–6	Canada	Santa Ana, Costa Rica
21:30 ET	Coto (red card) 53'	Report	Viens 7'; Sonis 41', 54' (pen.), 78' (pen.); Huitema 84'; Alidou 90+2'	Stadium: Estadio Piedades de Santa Ana

November 28 2026 CONCACAF W Championship QF	Canada	v	Panama	Mansfield, United States
				Stadium: Texas Health Mansfield Stadium

== Club soccer ==
=== Leagues ===
==== Men's ====
- 2026 Canadian Premier League season
- 2026 Major League Soccer season
- 2026 MLS Next Pro season
- 2026 Premier Soccer Leagues Canada season
  - 2026 Alberta Premier League season
  - 2026 British Columbia Premier League season
  - 2026 Ontario Premier League season
  - 2026 Prairies Premier League season
  - 2026 LS Pro season
- 2026 Canadian Soccer League season

==== Women's ====
- 2026 Northern Super League season
- 2026 Premier Soccer Leagues Canada season
  - 2026 Alberta Premier League season
  - 2026 British Columbia Premier League season
  - 2026 Ontario Premier League season (women)
  - 2026 Prairies Premier League season
  - 2026 LS Pro Féminin season

=== Events ===
- 2026 Canadian Championship
  - 2026 Canadian Championship final
- 2026 CONCACAF Champions Cup
- 2026 CPL–U Sports Draft
- 2026 U Sports Men's Soccer Championship
- 2026 U Sports Women's Soccer Championship

=== Team seasons ===
==== Men's teams ====
- 2026 Atlético Ottawa season
- 2026 Cavalry FC season
- 2026 Forge FC season
- 2026 HFX Wanderers FC season
- 2026 Inter Toronto FC season
- 2026 CF Montréal season
- 2026 Pacific FC season
- 2026 FC Supra du Québec season
- 2026 Toronto FC season
- 2026 Toronto FC II season
- 2026 Vancouver FC season
- 2026 Vancouver Whitecaps FC season

==== Women's teams ====
- 2026 Calgary Wild FC season
- 2026 Halifax Tides FC season
- 2026 Montreal Roses FC season
- 2026 Ottawa Rapid FC season
- 2026 AFC Toronto season
- 2026 Vancouver Rise FC season
