= 2026 Prairies Premier League season =

Canadian semi-pro soccer league season

Prairies Premier League
- Season: 2026
- Dates: May 10 – July 18
- Country: Canada (Saskatchewan, Manitoba, Northern Ontario)
- Teams: 6 (men); 6 (women)
- Champions: Thunder Bay Chill (men); Bonivital Flames (women)
- Runner up: Queen City United SC (men); FC Manitoba (women)
- Matches: 60
- Goals: 203 (3.38 per match)
- Top goalscorer: Jamaal Abdullahi (13 goals); Ella Favot (10 goals)

The 2026 Prairies Premier League season was the inaugural season of the Prairies Premier League, a semi-professional men's and women's soccer league in the Canadian soccer league system and the highest level of soccer based in the Canadian provinces of Manitoba and Saskatchewan.

== Clubs ==
During this season, the league consisted of seven clubs: three from Saskatchewan, three from Manitoba, and one from Northwestern Ontario. For the 2026 season, 6 teams competed in each of the men's and women's divisions.

Prairies Prairies Premier League Metro Area

Winnipeg Prairies Premier League

Team	City	Province	Principal stadium	Men's division	Women's division
Queen City United SC	Regina	Saskatchewan	Leibel Field (Note: Queen City hosted men's and women's matches at Rams Field at the University of Regina on May 13, as well as a women's match at Mosaic Stadium on May 29.)	Participating	Participating
Forza Soccer Academy	Saskatoon	Saskatchewan	Saskatoon Minor Football Field	Participating	Did not enter
Saskatchewan EXCEL	Saskatoon	Saskatchewan	Saskatoon Minor Football Field	Participating	Participating
Bonivital Flames	Winnipeg	Manitoba	Saint Vital Memorial Park	Participating	Participating
FC Manitoba	Winnipeg	Manitoba	Ralph Cantafio Soccer Complex (Note: FC Manitoba moved men's and women's matches indoors to Winnipeg Soccer Federation South due to adverse weather on May 27. Lucania hosted a women's match indoors at Winnipeg Soccer Federation North on June 30.)	Participating	Participating
Winnipeg Lucania FC	Winnipeg	Manitoba	Ralph Cantafio Soccer Complex	Did not enter	Participating
Thunder Bay Chill	Thunder Bay	Ontario	Tbaytel Field at Chapples Park	Participating	Participating

== Men's division ==
The 10-game season was played as a double round-robin, with each team playing the other five teams once at home and once away. Unlike the champions of the other four semi-professional leagues associated with Premier Soccer Leagues Canada, the Thunder Bay Chill were not invited to compete in the 2027 Canadian Championship despite claiming the PPL's inaugural league title.

=== Standings ===
Pos	Team	Pld	W	D	L	GF	GA	GD	Pts
1	Thunder Bay Chill (C)	10	6	3	1	22	11	+11	21
2	Queen City United SC	10	5	3	2	29	19	+10	18
3	Bonivital Flames	10	4	3	3	16	14	+2	15
4	Saskatchewan EXCEL	10	4	3	3	14	11	+3	15
5	FC Manitoba	10	4	1	5	23	16	+7	13
6	Forza Soccer Academy	10	0	1	9	9	42	−33	1

Source: PPL
Rules for classification: 1) Head-to-head points (only if between two teams); 2) Goal differential; 3) Total wins; 4) Goals for; 5) Away goal differential; 6) Away goals for; 7) Home goal differential; 8) Home goals for; 9) Drawing of lots.
(C) Champions

=== Results ===
Home \ Away	BON	FOR	MAN	QCU	SAS	TBC
Bonivital Flames		6–1	1–2	1–1	0–0	0–1
Forza Soccer Academy	1–2		0–8	3–4	0–0	1–6
FC Manitoba	1–2	2–1		2–3	2–3	1–1
Queen City United SC	6–2	7–1	0–2		1–1	1–3
Saskatchewan EXCEL	0–1	5–1	2–1	1–3		1–0
Thunder Bay Chill	1–1	2–0	3–2	3–3	2–1	

Source: PPL
Legend: Blue = home team win; Yellow = draw; Red = away team win.

=== Statistics ===
Top goalscorers

Rank	Player	Club	Goals
1	Jamaal Abdullahi	Queen City United SC	13
2	Nick Phyllis	Thunder Bay Chill	11
3	Diego Reveco	FC Manitoba	7
4	Hunter Delahunt	FC Manitoba	6
5	Coen LaClare	Saskatchewan EXCEL	4
5	Faisal Karoyo	Forza Soccer Academy	4
5	Ifeoluwa Olusoji-Adeyeye	Saskatchewan EXCEL	4
5	Malik Darbi	Queen City United SC	4
9	Matteo Bosch	Thunder Bay Chill	3
9	Rajesh Rodney	Saskatchewan EXCEL	3

Source: PPL

== Women's division ==
The 10-game season was played as a double round-robin, with each team playing the other five teams once at home and once away.

=== Standings ===
Pos	Team	Pld	W	D	L	GF	GA	GD	Pts
1	Bonivital Flames (C)	10	6	2	2	16	13	+3	20
2	FC Manitoba	10	5	2	3	12	8	+4	17
3	Thunder Bay Chill	10	4	3	3	21	17	+4	15
4	Saskatchewan EXCEL	10	4	0	6	13	20	−7	12
5	Queen City United SC	10	2	4	4	13	15	−2	10
6	Winnipeg Lucania FC	10	2	3	5	15	17	−2	9

Source: PPL
Rules for classification: 1) Head-to-head points (only if between two teams); 2) Goal differential; 3) Total wins; 4) Goals for; 5) Away goal differential; 6) Away goals for; 7) Home goal differential; 8) Home goals for; 9) Drawing of lots.
(C) Champions

=== Results ===
Home \ Away	BON	LUC	MAN	QCU	SAS	TBC
Bonivital Flames		0–3	1–0	0–0	2–1	3–3
Winnipeg Lucania FC	0–3		1–1	0–2	5–1	1–1
FC Manitoba	0–2	2–1		1–0	1–2	3–0
Queen City United SC	0–3	2–2	0–0		0–1	1–2
Saskatchewan EXCEL	0–1	2–1	0–1	3–5		1–0
Thunder Bay Chill	6–1	3–1	0–2	2–2	4–2	

Source: PPL
Legend: Blue = home team win; Yellow = draw; Red = away team win.

=== Statistics ===
Top goalscorers

Rank	Player	Club	Goals
1	Ella Favot	Thunder Bay Chill	10
2	Olivia Gables	Queen City United SC	8
3	Madison Mayert	Winnipeg Lucania FC	5
4	Emily Pegg	Saskatchewan EXCEL	4
4	Sarah Nason	Bonivital Flames	4
6	Amella Puskar	FC Manitoba	3
6	Elly Mitchell	Saskatchewan EXCEL	3
6	Imogene Joseph	Thunder Bay Chill	3
6	Olivia Walsh	Thunder Bay Chill	3
10	10 players		2

Source: PPL
