= 2019 in Canadian soccer =

2019 in Canadian soccer
(Canada)

Men's Domestic Club Leagues
Div	League	Champion
I	(Canada) CPL	Forge FC
III	(Canada) L1O	Master's Futbol
III	(Canada) PLSQ	A.S. Blainville

Men's International Club Leagues
Div	League	Champion
I	(United States) (Canada) MLS	Seattle Sounders FC
II	(United States) (Canada) USLC	Real Monarchs SLC
III	(United States) (Canada) USL1	North Texas SC
IV	(United States) (Canada) USL2	Flint City Bucks

Women's Club Leagues
Div	League	Champion
I	(United States) NWSL	North Carolina Courage
II	(United States) (Canada) UWS	LA Galaxy Orange County
III	(Canada) L1O	FC London
III	(Canada) PLSQF	CS Monteuil

Men's Domestic Cups
Div	Name	Champion
I	Canadian Championship	Montreal Impact
II	Canadian Championship	Montreal Impact
III	Canadian Championship	Montreal Impact
IV	Challenge Trophy	Central City Breakers FC

Women's Domestic Cups
Div	Name	Champion
IV	Jubilee Trophy	Royal Sélect Beauport

The 2019 season was the 143rd season of competitive soccer in Canada.

== National teams ==
When available, the home team or the team that is designated as the home team is listed in the left column; the away team is in the right column.

Win Draw Loss

=== Senior Men ===
==== 2019–20 CONCACAF Nations League qualifying ====
March 24, 2019 CNL Qualifying	Canada	4–1	French Guiana	Vancouver, Canada
3:00 pm PT	Hoilett 11'; Cavallini 39', 50'; Jonathan David 41'	Report	Rimane 26'	Stadium: BC Place; Referee: Diego Montaño (Mexico)

Canada qualifies for the 2019 CONCACAF Gold Cup and the 2019–20 CONCACAF Nations League (League A).

==== 2019 CONCACAF Gold Cup ====
June 15, 2019 Group stage	Canada	4–0	Martinique	Pasadena, United States
4:30 pm PT	Jonathan David 33', 53'; Hoilett 63'; Arfield 67'	Report		Stadium: Rose Bowl; Attendance: 65,527; Referee: Said Martínez (Honduras)

June 19, 2019 Group stage	Mexico	3–1	Canada	Denver, United States
8:30 pm MT	Alvarado 40'; Guardado 54', 77'	Report	Cavallini 75'	Stadium: Broncos Stadium at Mile High; Attendance: 52,874; Referee: Henry Bejarano (Costa Rica)

June 23, 2019 Group stage	Canada	7–0	Cuba	Charlotte, United States
6:00 pm ET	Jonathan David 3', 71', 77'; Cavallini 21', 43', 45+1'; Hoilett 50'	Report		Stadium: Bank of America Stadium; Attendance: 59,283; Referee: Armando Villarreal (United States)

June 29, 2019 Quarter-finals	Haiti	3–2	Canada	Houston, United States
7:00 pm ET	Nazon 50'; Bazile 70' (pen.); Guerrier 76'	Report	Jonathan David 18'; Cavallini 28'	Stadium: NRG Stadium; Attendance: 70,788; Referee: Jair Marrufo (United States)

Canada eliminated in the quarter-finals.

==== 2019–20 CONCACAF Nations League ====
September 7 Group stage	Canada	6–0	Cuba	Toronto
20:00 EDT (UTC-04:00)	Hoilett 13', 50', 82' (pen.); Jonathan David 21'; Osorio 52'; Henry 65'	Report		Stadium: BMO Field; Attendance: 10,224; Referee: Fernando Hernández (Mexico)

September 10 Group stage	Cuba	0–1	Canada	George Town, Cayman Islands
19:15 EDT (UTC-04:00)		Report	Davies 9'	Stadium: Truman Bodden Sports Complex; Referee: Mario Escobar (Guatemala)

October 15 Group stage	Canada	2–0	United States	Toronto
19:30 EDT (UTC-04:00)	Davies 63'; Cavallini 90+1'	Report		Stadium: BMO Field; Attendance: 17,126; Referee: Daneon Parchment (Jamaica)

November 15 Group stage	United States	4–1	Canada	Orlando, United States
19:00	Morris 2'; Zardes 23', 89'; Long 34'	Report	Vitória 72'	Stadium: Exploria Stadium; Attendance: 13,103; Referee: César Ramos (Mexico)

Canada qualifies for the 2021 CONCACAF Gold Cup.

=== Senior Women ===
==== 2019 Algarve Cup ====
February 27, 2019 Group Stage	Canada	0–0	Iceland	Parchal, Portugal
1:15 pm WET		Report		Stadium: Bela Vista Municipal Stadium

March 1, 2019 Group Stage	Canada	1–0	Scotland	Lagos, Portugal
1:15 pm WET	Sinclair 81' (pen.)	Report		Stadium: Lagos Municipal Stadium

March 6, 2019 Third place	Canada	0–0 (6–5 p)	Sweden	São João da Venda, Portugal
5:00 pm WET		Report		Stadium: Estádio Algarve
	Penalties
	Schmidt (penalty scored); Sinclair (penalty missed); Rose (penalty scored); Lawrence (penalty scored); Beckie (penalty scored); Buchanan (penalty scored); Fleming (penalty scored)		(penalty scored) Anvegård; (penalty scored) Sembrant; (penalty scored) Björn; (penalty missed) Larsson; (penalty scored) Jakobsson; (penalty scored) Ericsson; (penalty missed) Glas

Canada finishes in (bronze) third place.

==== 2019 FIFA Women's World Cup ====
June 10, 2019 Group Stage	Canada	1–0	Cameroon	Montpellier, France
9:00 pm CET	Buchanan 45'	Report		Stadium: Stade de la Mosson; Attendance: 10,710; Referee: Ri Hyang-ok (North Korea)

June 15, 2019 Group Stage	Canada	2–0	New Zealand	Grenoble, France
9:00 pm CET	Fleming 48'; Prince 79'	Report		Stadium: Stade des Alpes; Attendance: 14,856; Referee: Yoshimi Yamashita (Japan)

June 20, 2019 Group Stage	Netherlands	2–1	Canada	Reims, France
6:00 pm CET	Dekker 54'; Beerensteyn 75'	Report	Sinclair 60'	Stadium: Stade Auguste-Delaune; Attendance: 19,277; Referee: Stéphanie Frappart (France)

June 24, 2019 Round of 16	Sweden	1–0	Canada	Paris, France
9:00 pm CET	Blackstenius 55'	Report		Stadium: Parc des Princes; Attendance: 38,078; Referee: Kate Jacewicz (Australia)

Canada eliminated in the round of 16.

==== Friendlies ====
January 22, 2019 Friendly	Canada	1–0	Norway	La Manga, Spain
6:00 pm CET	Sinclair 66'	Report		Stadium: La Manga Stadium

April 5, 2019 Friendly	England	0–1	Canada	Manchester, England
7:00 pm BST		Report	Sinclair 80'	Stadium: Academy Stadium

April 8, 2019 Friendly	Canada	2–1	Nigeria	Mercia, Spain
4:00 pm CET	Beckie 47'; Schmidt 53'	Report	Oparanozie 27'	Stadium: Pinatar Stadium

May 18, 2019 Friendly	Canada	3–0	Mexico	Toronto, Canada
1:00 pm ET	Fleming 20'; Sinclair 53'; Leon 79'	Report		Stadium: BMO Field; Attendance: 19,610

May 24, 2019 Friendly	Spain	0–0	Canada	Logroño, Spain
7:00 pm CET		Report		Stadium: Estadio Las Gaunas; Attendance: 4,389

== Men's domestic club leagues ==
=== Canadian Premier League ===
Seven teams play in this league, all of which are based in Canada. It is considered a Division 1 men's league in the Canadian soccer league system.

Pos	Team	Pld	W	D	L	GF	GA	GD	Pts	Qualification
1	Cavalry (S)	28	19	5	4	51	19	+32	62	2019 CPL finals (Note: As winner of the 2019 Spring and Fall seasons)
2	Forge (C)	28	17	5	6	45	26	+19	56	2019 CPL finals (Note: As second place in overall table)
3	York9	28	9	7	12	39	37	+2	34	
4	FC Edmonton	28	8	8	12	27	33	−6	32	
5	Pacific	28	8	7	13	35	46	−11	31	
6	Valour	28	8	4	16	30	52	−22	28	
7	HFX Wanderers	28	6	10	12	21	35	−14	28	

Source: CanPL.ca
Rules for classification: 1) points; 2) total wins; 3) goal differential; 4) goals for; 5) away goal differential; 6) away goals for; 7) home goal differential; 8) home goals for; 9) coin toss or drawing of lots.
(C) Champions; (S) Regular season winner

=== League1 Ontario (Men) ===
16 teams play in this league, all of which are based in Canada. It is considered a Division 3 men's league in the Canadian soccer league system.

Pos	Team	Pld	W	D	L	GF	GA	GD	Pts	Qualification
1	Oakville Blue Devils	15	12	2	1	29	8	+21	38	Playoffs
2	Vaughan Azzurri	15	12	1	2	45	15	+30	37	Playoffs
3	Alliance United FC	15	11	3	1	28	6	+22	36	Playoffs
4	Master’s Futbol (C)	15	9	3	3	33	18	+15	30	Playoffs
5	Sigma FC	15	8	3	4	37	25	+12	27	Playoffs
6	North Mississauga SC	15	8	2	5	32	15	+17	26	Playoffs
7	FC London	15	8	1	6	23	18	+5	25 (Note: FC London beat Woodbridge Strikers on head-to-head points (3–0).)	Playoffs
8	Woodbridge Strikers	15	8	1	6	28	18	+10	25	Playoffs
9	Darby FC	15	7	2	6	35	17	+18	23	
10	Aurora FC	15	6	3	6	34	27	+7	21	
11	ProStars FC	15	5	2	8	13	31	−18	17	
12	Unionville Milliken SC	15	3	3	9	15	33	−18	12	
13	Windsor TFC	15	3	2	10	11	34	−23	11	
14	Durham United FA	15	2	2	11	16	38	−22	8	
15	Toronto Skillz FC	15	2	1	12	5	53	−48	7	
16	Ottawa South United	15	0	1	14	1	29	−28	1	

Source: http://www.league1ontario.com/page/show/2309115-standings
Rules for classification: 1) points; 2) total wins; 3) head-to-head points; 4) goal differential; 5) most goals
(C) Champion and qualification to 2020 Canadian Championship
Notes:

Pos	Team	Pld	W	D	L	GF	GA	GD	Pts
1	Oakville Blue Devils Reserves	12	8	3	1	43	13	+30	27
2	FC London Reserves	12	8	3	1	38	13	+25	27
3	Vaughan Azzurri Reserves	12	7	1	4	31	19	+12	22
4	Oakville SC U21	12	6	2	4	24	19	+5	20
5	Darby FC Reserves	12	5	4	3	20	19	+1	19
6	Master’s Futbol Reserves	12	5	1	6	18	25	−7	16
7	Hamilton United U21	12	4	2	6	18	30	−12	14
8	Sigma FC Reserves B1	12	3	4	5	20	23	−3	13
9	Sigma FC Reserves B2	12	3	1	8	21	32	−11	10
10	ProStars FC Reserves	12	0	1	11	11	51	−40	1

Source: https://league1.e2esoccer.com/About_ArchivedStats.aspx
Rules for classification: 1) points; 2) total wins; 3) head-to-head points; 4) goal differential; 5) most goals

=== Première Ligue de Soccer du Québec ===
Nine teams play in this league, all of which are based in Canada. It is considered a Division 3 men's league in the Canadian soccer league system.

Pos	Team	Pld	W	D	L	GF	GA	GD	Pts	Qualification
1	AS Blainville (C)	16	11	4	1	43	12	+31	37	2020 Canadian Championship
2	CS Mont-Royal Outremont	16	11	4	1	41	12	+29	37	
3	Dynamo de Québec	16	7	6	3	31	23	+8	27	
4	CS Fabrose	16	7	5	4	30	21	+9	26	
5	CS St-Hubert	16	7	3	6	25	25	0	24	
6	CS Monteuil	16	6	6	4	27	23	+4	24	
7	FC Lanaudière	16	3	2	11	27	51	−24	11	
8	CS Longueuil	16	2	4	10	23	45	−22	10	
9	FC Gatineau	16	0	2	14	12	47	−35	2	

Updated to match(es) played on September 7, 2019. Source: http://www.tsisports.ca/soccer/ligue/l_classam.aspx
(C) Champion and qualification to 2020 Canadian Championship

=== Canadian Soccer League ===
Sixteen teams play in this league, all of which are based in Canada. It is a Non-FIFA league previously sanctioned by the Canadian Soccer Association and is now a member of the Soccer Federation of Canada (SFC).

First Division

Pos	Team	Pld	W	D	L	GF	GA	GD	Pts	Qualification
1	FC Vorkuta (C)	18	15	3	0	66	15	+51	48	Playoffs
2	Scarborough SC (O)	18	12	3	3	50	18	+32	39	Playoffs
3	FC Ukraine United	18	10	2	6	43	22	+21	32	Playoffs
4	SC Waterloo Region	18	10	1	7	41	25	+16	31	Playoffs
5	Serbian White Eagles	18	9	4	5	42	33	+9	31	Playoffs
6	Hamilton City	18	6	3	9	26	39	−13	21	Playoffs
7	CSC Mississauga	18	6	1	11	38	47	−9	19	Playoffs
8	Kingsman SC	18	6	1	11	30	48	−18	19	Playoffs
9	SC Real Mississauga	18	3	2	13	20	62	−42	11	
10	Brantford Galaxy	18	2	2	14	18	65	−47	8	

Source: []
Rules for classification: 1) points; 2) goal difference; 3) number of goals scored.
(C) Champions; (O) Play-off winners

Second Division

Pos	Team	Pld	W	D	L	GF	GA	GD	Pts	Qualification
1	FC Vorkuta B (C, O)	15	13	0	2	74	19	+55	39	Playoffs
2	Serbian White Eagles B	15	8	1	6	56	57	−1	25	Playoffs
3	CSC Mississauga B	15	7	2	6	38	45	−7	23	Playoffs
4	Kingsman SC B	15	4	4	7	27	41	−14	16	Playoffs
5	Hamilton City SC B	15	3	4	8	28	36	−8	13	Playoffs
6	Brantford Galaxy B	15	3	3	9	28	48	−20	12	Playoffs

Updated to match(es) played on October 3, 2019. Source: http://canadiansoccerleague.ca/2019-second-division-standings/
Rules for classification: 1) points; 2) goal difference; 3) number of goals scored.
(C) Champions; (O) Play-off winners

== Men's international club leagues ==
=== Major League Soccer ===
Three Canadian teams (Montreal Impact, Toronto FC, and Vancouver Whitecaps FC) play in this league, which also contains 21 teams from the United States. It is considered a Division 1 men's league in the United States soccer league system.

Overall standings

2019 MLS regular season standings
Pos	Team	Pld	W	L	T	GF	GA	GD	Pts	
1	Los Angeles FC (S)	34	21	4	9	85	37	+48	72	Qualification for the CONCACAF Champions League
2	New York City FC	34	18	6	10	63	42	+21	64	Qualification for the CONCACAF Champions League
3	Atlanta United FC (U)	34	18	12	4	58	43	+15	58	Qualification for the CONCACAF Champions League
4	Seattle Sounders FC (C)	34	16	10	8	52	49	+3	56	Qualification for the CONCACAF Champions League
5	Philadelphia Union	34	16	11	7	58	50	+8	55	
6	Real Salt Lake	34	16	13	5	46	41	+5	53	
7	Minnesota United FC	34	15	11	8	52	43	+9	53	
8	LA Galaxy	34	16	15	3	58	59	−1	51	
9	Toronto FC	34	13	10	11	57	52	+5	50	
10	D.C. United	34	13	10	11	42	38	+4	50	
11	Portland Timbers	34	14	13	7	52	49	+3	49	
12	New York Red Bulls	34	14	14	6	53	51	+2	48	
13	FC Dallas	34	13	12	9	54	46	+8	48	
14	New England Revolution	34	11	11	12	50	57	−7	45	
15	San Jose Earthquakes	34	13	16	5	52	55	−3	44	
16	Colorado Rapids	34	12	16	6	58	63	−5	42	
17	Chicago Fire	34	10	12	12	55	47	+8	42	
18	Montreal Impact (V)	34	12	17	5	47	60	−13	41	Qualification for the CONCACAF Champions League
19	Houston Dynamo	34	12	18	4	49	59	−10	40	
20	Columbus Crew SC	34	10	16	8	39	47	−8	38	
21	Sporting Kansas City	34	10	16	8	49	67	−18	38	
22	Orlando City SC	34	9	15	10	44	52	−8	37	
23	Vancouver Whitecaps FC	34	8	16	10	37	59	−22	34	
24	FC Cincinnati	34	6	22	6	31	75	−44	24	

Source: MLS
Rules for classification: 1) points; 2) total wins; 3) total goal differential; 4) total goals scored; 5) disciplinary points; 6) away goals scored; 7) away goal differential; 8) coin toss or drawing of lots
(C) MLS Cup champions; (S) Supporters' Shield winners; (U) U.S. Open Cup winners; (V) Canadian Championship winners

=== USL Championship ===
One Canadian team (Ottawa Fury FC) plays in this league, which also contains 35 teams from the United States. It is considered a Division 2 men's league in the United States soccer league system.

Pos	Team	Pld	W	D	L	GF	GA	GD	Pts	Qualification
1	Pittsburgh Riverhounds SC	34	19	11	4	58	30	+28	68	Conference Quarterfinals
2	Nashville SC	34	20	7	7	59	26	+33	67	Conference Quarterfinals
3	Indy Eleven	34	19	6	9	48	29	+19	63	Conference Quarterfinals
4	Louisville City FC	34	17	9	8	58	41	+17	60	Conference Quarterfinals
5	Tampa Bay Rowdies	34	16	10	8	61	33	+28	58	Conference Quarterfinals
6	New York Red Bulls II	34	17	6	11	74	51	+23	57	Conference Quarterfinals
7	North Carolina FC	34	16	8	10	57	37	+20	56	Play-In Round
8	Ottawa Fury FC	34	14	10	10	50	43	+7	52	Play-In Round
9	Charleston Battery	34	11	13	10	44	44	0	46	Play-In Round
10	Birmingham Legion FC	34	12	7	15	35	51	−16	43	Play-In Round
11	Saint Louis FC	34	11	9	14	40	41	−1	42	
12	Loudoun United FC	34	11	6	17	59	65	−6	39	
13	Charlotte Independence	34	9	11	14	42	53	−11	38	
14	Atlanta United 2	34	9	8	17	45	77	−32	35	
15	Memphis 901 FC	34	9	7	18	37	52	−15	34	
16	Bethlehem Steel FC	34	8	7	19	49	78	−29	31	
17	Hartford Athletic	34	8	5	21	49	80	−31	29	
18	Swope Park Rangers	34	6	8	20	46	80	−34	26	

Source: USL Championship Standings
Rules for classification: 1) total wins; 2) total goal differential; 3) total goals scored; 4) points earned against top four Conference finishers; 5) disciplinary points; 6) coin toss or drawing of lots

=== USL League One ===
One Canadian team (Toronto FC II) plays in this league, which also contains nine teams from the United States. It is considered a Division 3 men's league in the United States soccer league system.

Pos	Team	Pld	W	D	L	GF	GA	GD	Pts	Qualification
1	North Texas SC	28	17	5	6	53	31	+22	56	Playoffs
2	Lansing Ignite FC	28	12	10	6	49	37	+12	46	Playoffs
3	Greenville Triumph SC	28	12	7	9	32	22	+10	43	Playoffs
4	Forward Madison FC	28	12	7	9	33	26	+7	43	Playoffs
5	Chattanooga Red Wolves SC	28	10	10	8	35	37	−2	40	
6	South Georgia Tormenta FC	28	9	10	9	32	34	−2	37	
7	Toronto FC II	28	9	9	10	43	46	−3	36	
8	FC Tucson	28	8	9	11	35	41	−6	33	
9	Richmond Kickers	28	9	5	14	26	35	−9	32	
10	Orlando City B	28	4	4	20	23	52	−29	16	

Source: 2019 USL League One standings
Rules for classification: 1) total wins; 2) total goal differential; 3) total goals scored; 4) points earned against top four Conference finishers; 5) disciplinary points; 6) coin toss or drawing of lots

=== USL League Two ===
Five Canadian teams play in this league, which also contains 69 teams from the United States. It is unofficially considered a Division 4 men's league in the United States soccer league system.

Heartland Division - (Canada) Thunder Bay Chill, WSA Winnipeg

Pos	Team	Pld	W	L	T	GF	GA	GD	Pts	Qualification
1	Des Moines Menace (R)	14	11	0	3	30	4	+26	36	Central Conference playoffs
2	Kaw Valley FC	14	7	3	4	18	9	+9	25	Central Conference playoffs
3	Thunder Bay Chill	14	6	6	2	19	19	0	20 (Note: Thunder Bay Chill and Green Bay Voyageurs were tied on head-to-head points. (3-3))	
4	Green Bay Voyageurs	14	5	4	5	18	15	+3	20	
5	St. Louis Lions	14	4	7	3	17	20	−3	15	
6	WSA Winnipeg	14	0	13	1	5	40	−35	1	

Source: 2019 USL League Two standings
Rules for classification: 1) head-to-head record; 2) total wins; 3) total goal differential; 4) total goals scored; 5) record against the smallest group; 6) points earned against top four conference finishers; 7) point percentage outside smallest group; 8) disciplinary points; 9) coin toss or drawing of lots
(R) Regular Season Champions
Notes:

Northwest Division - (Canada) Calgary Foothills FC, TSS FC Rovers, Victoria Highlanders

Pos	Team	Pld	W	L	T	GF	GA	GD	Pts	Qualification
1	Calgary Foothills FC	14	9	3	2	25	15	+10	29	Western Conference playoffs
2	Seattle Sounders FC U-23	14	7	3	4	24	13	+11	25	
3	Lane United FC	14	5	4	5	22	17	+5	20	
4	Victoria Highlanders	14	6	7	1	22	22	0	19	
5	Portland Timbers U23	14	3	7	4	19	33	−14	13	
6	TSS FC Rovers (J)	14	3	9	2	19	31	−12	11	

Source: 2019 USL League Two standings
Rules for classification: 1) head-to-head record; 2) total wins; 3) total goal differential; 4) total goals scored; 5) record against the smallest group; 6) points earned against top four conference finishers; 7) point percentage outside smallest group; 8) disciplinary points; 9) coin toss or drawing of lots
(J) Juan de Fuca Plate

== Women's club leagues ==
=== National Women's Soccer League ===
No Canadian teams play in this league, though players from the Canada women's national soccer team are allocated to its teams by the Canadian Soccer Association. It is considered a Division 1 women's league in the United States soccer league system.

Pos	Team	Pld	W	D	L	GF	GA	GD	Pts	Qualification
1	North Carolina Courage (C)	24	15	4	5	54	23	+31	49	NWSL Shield
2	Chicago Red Stars	24	14	2	8	41	28	+13	44	NWSL Playoffs
3	Portland Thorns FC	24	11	7	6	40	31	+9	40	NWSL Playoffs
4	Reign FC	24	10	8	6	27	27	0	38	NWSL Playoffs
5	Washington Spirit	24	9	7	8	30	25	+5	34	
6	Utah Royals FC	24	10	4	10	25	25	0	34	
7	Houston Dash	24	7	5	12	21	36	−15	26	
8	Sky Blue FC	24	5	5	14	20	34	−14	20	
9	Orlando Pride	24	4	4	16	24	53	−29	16	

Source: NWSL
Rules for classification: Tiebreakers
(C) Champions

=== United Women's Soccer ===
Two Canadian teams (Calgary Foothills WFC and Queen City United SC) play in this league, which also contains 27 teams from the United States. It is unofficially considered a Division 2 women's league in the United States soccer league system.

Pos	Team	Pld	W	L	T	GF	GA	GD	Pts	Qualification
1	Calgary Foothills WFC	8	6	1	1	20	5	+15	19	2019 UWS national playoffs
2	LA Galaxy Orange County	8	5	1	2	16	4	+12	17	2019 UWS national playoffs
3	Santa Clarita Blue Heat	8	5	2	1	14	9	+5	16	
4	Queen City United SC	8	2	6	0	5	18	−13	6	
5	Colorado Pride	8	0	8	0	3	22	−19	0	

Source: UWS standings
Rules for classification: 1) Head-to-head based on total points; 2) Total wins; 3) Goal difference all league games; 4) Goals scored in league games

=== League1 Ontario (Women) ===
14 teams play in this league, all of which are based in Canada. It is considered a Division 3 women's league in the Canadian soccer league system.

Pos	Team	Pld	W	D	L	GF	GA	GD	Pts	Qualification
1	Oakville Blue Devils FC	13	11	0	2	47	11	+36	33	League Playoffs
2	Vaughan Azzurri	13	10	1	2	45	10	+35	31	League Playoffs
3	FC London (C)	13	7	3	3	39	18	+21	24	League Playoffs
4	Woodbridge Strikers	13	7	1	5	28	11	+17	22	League Playoffs
5	Ottawa South United	13	6	2	5	30	25	+5	20 (Note: Head-to-head: Ottawa South United (6 pts), FC Oshawa (1 pt), Alliance United FC (1 pt).)	League Playoffs
6	FC Oshawa	13	6	2	5	27	16	+11	20	League Playoffs
7	Alliance United FC	13	6	2	5	19	30	−11	20	League Playoffs
8	Darby FC	13	6	1	6	22	24	−2	19	League Playoffs
9	DeRo United FC	13	5	3	5	17	22	−5	18	
10	Durham United FA	13	4	5	4	26	21	+5	17 (Note: Head-to-head: Durham United FA (1 pt), Unionville Milliken SC (1 pt).)	
11	Unionville Milliken SC	13	4	5	4	25	22	+3	17	
12	Hamilton United	13	4	1	8	30	32	−2	13	
13	Aurora FC	13	1	2	10	21	27	−6	5	
14	North Mississauga SC	13	0	0	13	5	112	−107	0	

Source: http://www.league1ontario.com/page/show/2309115-standings
Rules for classification: 1) points; 2) total wins; 3) head-to-head points; 4) goal differential; 5) goals scored; 6) away goal differential; 7) away goals scored; 8) coin toss or drawing of lots.
(C) Champion

=== Première Ligue de soccer du Québec (Women) ===
Six teams play in this league, all of which are based in Canada. It is considered a Division 3 women's league in the Canadian soccer league system.

Pos	Team	Pld	W	D	L	GF	GA	GD	Pts	Qualification
1	CS Monteuil (C)	15	10	3	2	29	17	+12	33	Champion
2	Dynamo de Québec	15	9	4	2	46	18	+28	31	
3	AS Blainville	15	7	4	4	46	30	+16	25	
4	CS Fabrose	15	3	4	8	19	33	−14	13	
5	FC Sélect Rive-Sud	15	3	3	9	14	35	−21	12	
6	CS Mont-Royal Outremont	15	2	4	9	13	34	−21	10	

Source: http://www.tsisports.ca/soccer/ligue/l_classam.aspx
(C) Champion

== Domestic cups ==
=== Canadian Championship ===
The Canadian Championship is a national cup contested by men's teams in divisions 1 through 3. The draw was held on February 12, 2019.

First qualifying round May 15–22
PLSQ	AS Blainville	0	0	0
CPL	York9 FC	0	1	1
CPL	Pacific FC	0	1	1
CPL	Cavalry FC	2	2	4
L1O	Vaughan Azzurri	2	1	3
CPL	HFX Wanderers FC (a)	3	0	3

Second qualifying round June 4–12
CPL	FC Edmonton	1	1	2
CPL	York9 FC	3	0	3
CPL	Forge FC	1	1	2
CPL	Cavalry FC	1	2	3
CPL	Valour FC	1	0	1
CPL	HFX Wanderers FC	2	2	4

Third qualifying round July 10–24
MLS	Montreal Impact	2	1	3
CPL	York9 FC	2	0	2
MLS	Vancouver Whitecaps FC	0	1	1
CPL	Cavalry FC	0	2	2
USL	Ottawa Fury FC	3	2	5
CPL	HFX Wanderers FC	2	2	4

Semi-finals; August 7–14
MLS	Montreal Impact	2	1	3
CPL	Cavalry FC	1	0	1
MLS	Toronto FC	2	3	5
USL	Ottawa Fury FC	0	0	0

Final; September 18–25
MLS	Montreal Impact (p)	1	0	1 (3)
MLS	Toronto FC	0	1	1 (1)

=== Challenge Trophy ===
The Challenge Trophy is a national cup contested by men's teams at the division 4 level and below.

=== Jubilee Trophy ===
The Jubilee Trophy is a national cup contested by women's teams at the division 4 level and below.

== Canadian clubs in international competition ==
=== 2019 CONCACAF Champions League ===
February 19, 2019 Round of 16	Independiente (Panama)	4–0	(Canada) Toronto FC	Estadio Agustín Sánchez, La Chorrera
8:00 pm ET	Ayarza 9'; Browne 48'; Ivey 52', 78'	Report		Referee: Iván Barton (El Salvador)

February 26, 2019 Round of 16	Toronto FC (Canada)	1–1	(Panama) Independiente	Toronto, Canada
8:00 pm ET	Hamilton 19'	Report	Browne 67'	Stadium: BMO Field; Referee: Juan Calderón (Costa Rica)

(Canada) Toronto FC loses 5–1 on aggregate.

=== 2019 CONCACAF League ===
==== Preliminary round ====
August 1 First leg	Forge FC (Canada)	2–1	(Guatemala) Antigua GFC	Hamilton, Ontario
6:00 pm	Krutzen 46'; Owundi (yellow card) 61'; Choinière 90+1'	Report	Pacheco 33'	Stadium: Tim Hortons Field; Attendance: 4,644; Referee: Juan Gabriel Calderón (Costa Rica)

August 8 Second leg	Antigua GFC (Guatemala)	0–0 (1–2 agg.)	(Canada) Forge FC	Guatemala City, Guatemala
8:00 pm	Mingorance (yellow card) 46' (yellow-red card) 86'	Report	Henry (yellow card) 45'; Borges (yellow card) 47'	Stadium: Estadio Doroteo Guamuch Flores; Referee: Randy Solano (Dominican Republic)

==== Round of 16 ====
August 22 First leg	Forge FC (Canada)	1–0	(Honduras) Olimpia	Hamilton, Ontario
8:00 pm	Nanco 4'; Frano (yellow card) 22'	Report		Stadium: Tim Hortons Field; Attendance: 4,876; Referee: José Raúl Torres (Puerto Rico)

August 29 Second leg	Olimpia (Honduras)	4–1 (4–2 agg.)	(Canada) Forge FC	San Pedro Sula, Honduras
10:00 pm	Ferrari 30'; Flores 42'; Lacayo 75'; Bengtson 79'	Report	Choinière 88'	Stadium: Estadio Olímpico Metropolitano; Attendance: 0 Referee: Henry Bejarano (Costa Rica)
Note: The match was played behind closed doors.
