= List of soccer clubs in Canada by competitive honours won =

This article lists Canadian professional soccer clubs whose men's sides have won competitive honours run by official governing bodies. Friendly competitions and matches organized between clubs are not included. A significant number of Canadian clubs have participated and continue to participate in leagues sanctioned by American authorities.

The first official title won by a Canadian professional soccer club was claimed by the Vancouver Whitecaps, who were crowned 1979 NASL champions after defeating the Tampa Bay Rowdies 2–1 in Soccer Bowl '79. From there, Canadian teams began playing in multiple different American and Canadian leagues, including the original Canadian Soccer League (1987–1992), the American Professional Soccer League (1990–1996), the USL First Division (2005–2010), Major League Soccer (1996–present), and finally, the Canadian Premier League (2019–present).

As of 2024, three Canadian professional clubs play in the U.S.-sanctioned Major League Soccer, while the other eight play in the Canadian Premier League.

== Summary totals ==
The table below shows every official title won by Canadian professional soccer clubs regardless of the division.

Numbers with a blue background are record totals for that category. Statistics include previous iterations of active professional clubs, such as the Vancouver Whitecaps and CF Montréal.

As of November 21, 2026

Club	League championships								Can. Champ.	Shield				Total
Club	CPL	MLS	NASL	CPSL	CSL	APSL	USL	Total	Can. Champ.	CPL	MLS	USL	Total	Total
Vancouver Whitecaps FC	–	–	1	–	4	–	2	7	5	– (Note: The CSL did not have an award for the team which won the most points in the regular season. For that reason, the Vancouver Whitecaps are shown as having won 0 titles in this section despite having the best regular season record 5 times in 1988, 1989, 1990, 1991, and 1992.)	–	– (Note: The Commissioner's Cup was not awarded in the APSL and USL A-League until the 2005 USL–1 season. For that reason, the Vancouver Whitecaps are shown as having won 0 titles in this section instead of 1, despite having the best regular season record in 1993.)	–	12
Toronto FC	–	1	–	–	–	–	–	1	8	–	1	–	1	10
CF Montréal	–	–	–	–	–	1	2	3	5 (Note: Despite the Voyageurs Cup from 2002 to 2007 being recognized as the official precursor to the Canadian Championship by CF Montréal, the Vancouver Whitecaps and Major League Soccer (MLS), Canada Soccer does not and has never recognized them. For that reason, CF Montréal are shown as having only won 5 titles in this section instead of 11.)	–	–	2 (Note: The Commissioner's Cup was not awarded in the APSL and USL A-League until the 2005 USL–1 season. For that reason, the Montreal Impact are shown as having won 2 titles in this section instead of 5, despite having the best regular season record in 1995, 1996, 1997.)	2	10
Forge FC	4	–	–	–	–	–	–	4	1	3	–	–	3	8
Cavalry FC	2	–	–	–	–	–	–	2	–	3	–	–	3	5
Atlético Ottawa	1	–	–	–	–	–	–	1	–	1	–	–	1	2
Calgary Kickers †	–	–	–	–	1	–	–	1	–	– (Note: The CSL did not have an award for the team which won the most points in the regular season. For that reason, the Calgary Kickers are shown as having won 0 titles in this section despite having the best regular season record in 1987.)	–	–	–	1
Edmonton Eagles †	–	–	–	1	–	–	–	1	–	– (Note: The CPSL did not have an award for the team which won the most points in the regular season. For that reason, the Edmonton Eagles are shown as having won 0 titles in this section despite having the best regular season record in 1983.)	–	–	–	1
Pacific FC	1	–	–	–	–	–	–	1	–	–	–	–	–	1
Toronto Blizzard †	–	–	1	–	–	–	–	1	–	–	–	–	–	1

† – Defunct club

== See also ==
- List of football clubs by competitive honours won
- Canadian soccer league system
- List of soccer clubs in Canada
