= L1C (disambiguation) =

L1C is a type of GPS signal.

L1C May also refer to:

- L1C (forward sortation area), a forward sortation area for Bowmanville, Ontario, Canada
- League1 Canada, a semi-pro association football (soccer) league in Canada
