= Jean-Baptiste Pierazzi =

French footballer (born 1985)

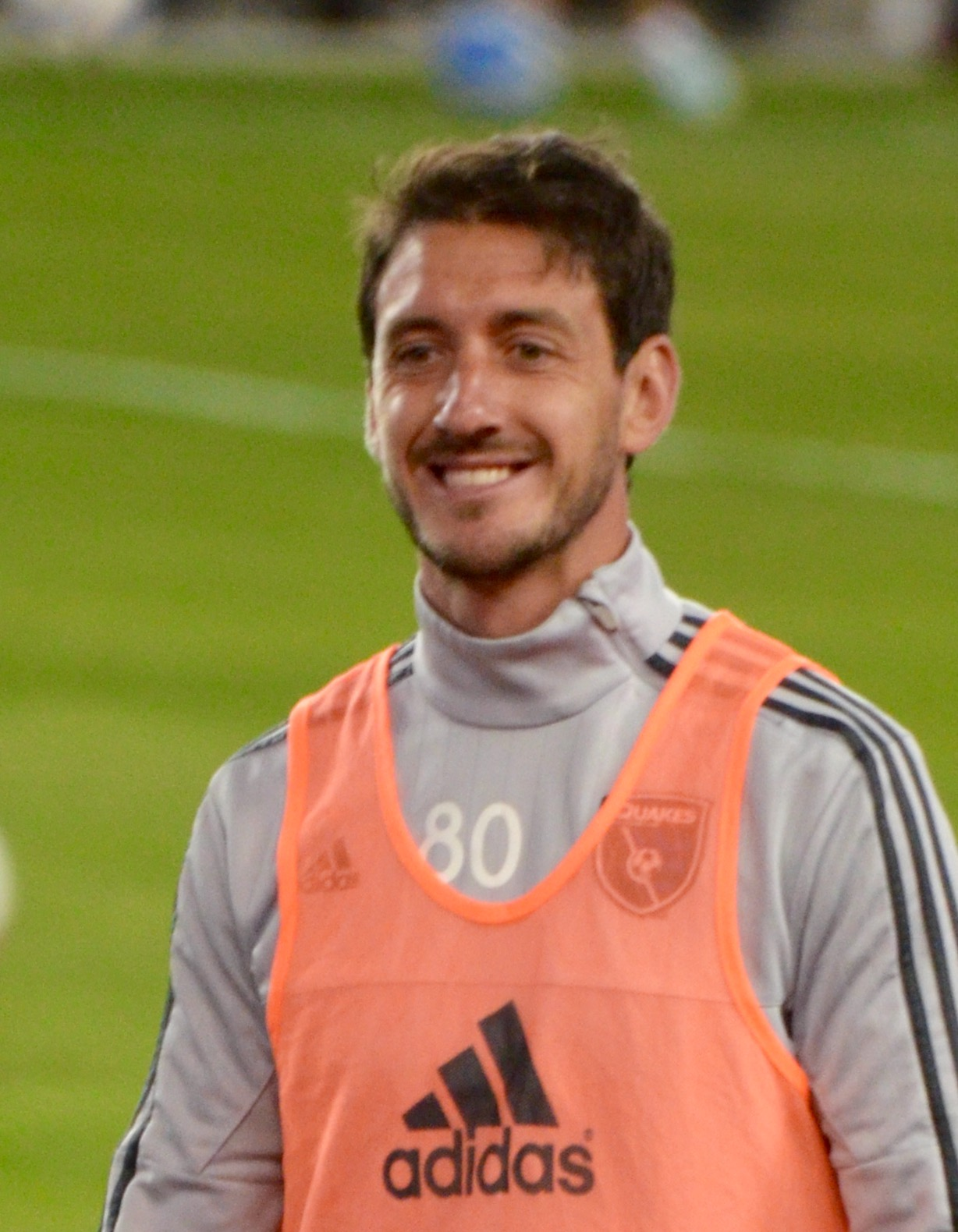

Personal information
- Date of birth: 17 June 1985 (age 41)
- Place of birth: Ajaccio, France
- Height: 1.85 m (6 ft 1 in)
- Position: Defensive midfielder

Senior career*
Years	Team	Apps	(Gls)
2006–2014	AC Ajaccio	179	(2)
2014–2015	San Jose Earthquakes	27	(1)
2016–2017	Paris FC	32	(2)
2017–2018	Alki Oroklini	15	(1)
2018–2020	Gazélec Ajaccio	48	(0)
2020–2021	Olympias Lympion	28	(1)
2021–2022	Omonia Aradippou	27	(0)

International career
2009	Corsica	4	(0)

Managerial career
- 2023: Ethnikos Achna (analyst)
- 2023–2024: AC Ajaccio (analyst)
- 2025: Valour FC (assistant)
- 2026–present: Bonivital Flames
- * Club domestic league appearances and goals

Jean-Baptiste Pierazzi (born 17 June 1985) is a retired French footballer who played as a defensive midfielder and is currently the head coach of the Bonivital Flames of the Prairies Premier League.

== Club career ==
Jean-Baptiste began his professional career with AC Ajaccio during the 2006–07 season, making his debut under coach Ruud Krol. He made 25 appearances in his debut season in Ligue 2, and was also an important player during Gernot Rohr's tenure at the club. He also captained the club during the 2010–11 season in which he helped Ajaccio gain promotion to Ligue 1. In his first season in the top flight, Pierazzi appeared in 34 league matches and helped the club maintain its Ligue 1 status. During his time with Ajaccio, Pierazzi appeared in 112 Ligue 2 matches and 67 Ligue 1 matches.

During January 2014, Pierazzi signed with Major League Soccer side San Jose Earthquakes.

== Post-retirement ==
From February to May 2023, Pierazzi worked as Head of Video & Tactical Analysis for Cypriot club Ethnikos Achna. In the summer of 2023, Pierazzi returned to his former club, AC Ajaccio, where he was hired as a video analyst.

In 2025, he joined Valour FC of the Canadian Premier League as an assistant coach. In 2026, he became the head coach of the Bonivital Flames of the Prairies Premier League.
