= Women's soccer in Canada =

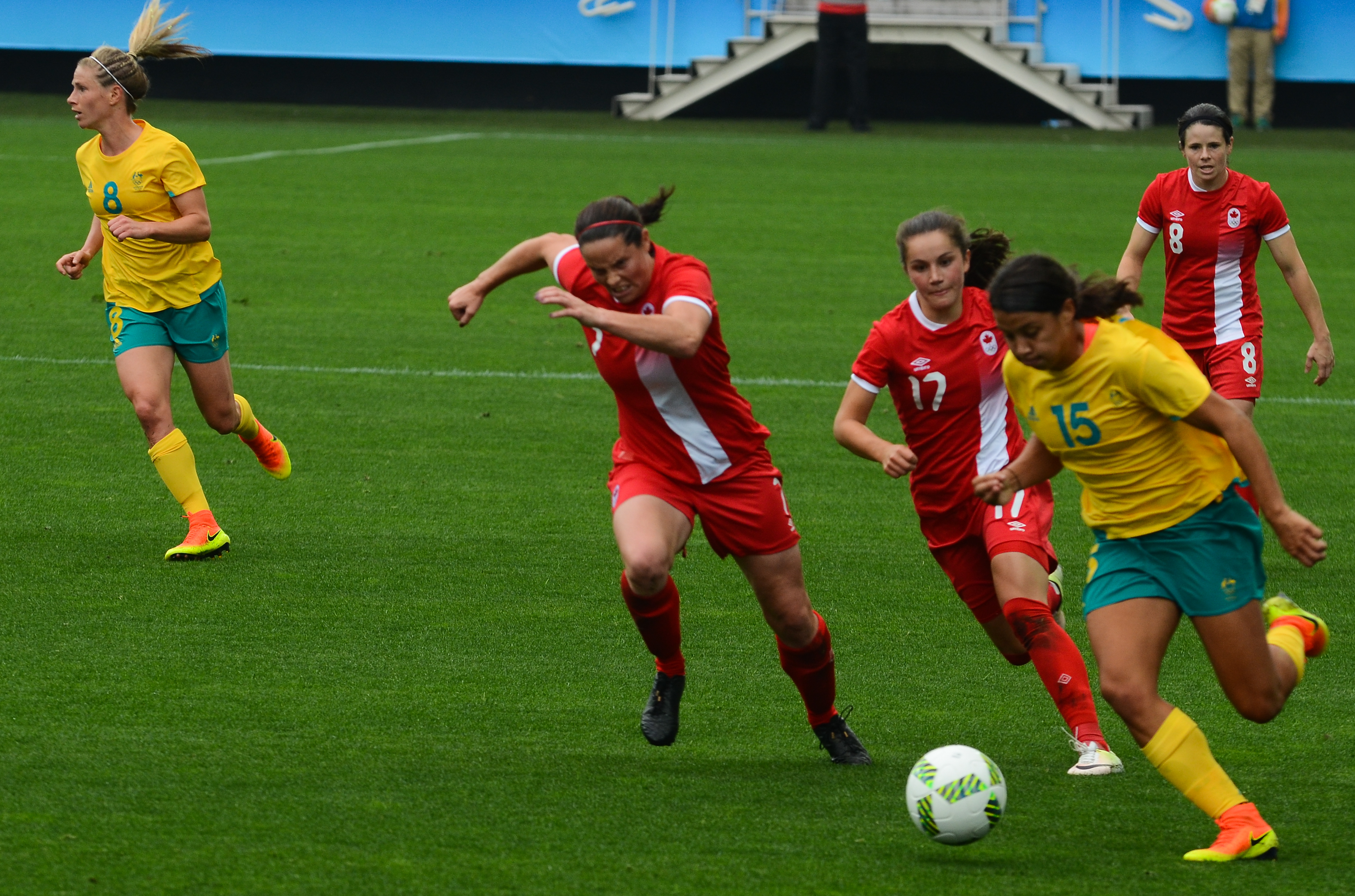
- The Canadian women's national soccer team in a soccer game against the Australian women's national soccer team during the 2016 Summer Olympics.
- Country: Canada
- Governing body: Canadian Soccer Association
- National teams: Senior; U-20; U-17

National competitions
- W Canadian Championship (pro); Inter-Provincial Championship (semi-pro); Jubilee Trophy (amateur)

Club competitions
- Northern Super League; Premier Soccer Leagues Canada; Alberta Premier League; British Columbia Premier League; LS Pro (Quebec); Ontario Premier League; Prairies Premier League

International competitions
- Olympic football tournament FIFA Women's World Cup; CONCACAF W Championship; CONCACAF W Champions Cup

Audience records
- Single match: 53,058 (2015 FIFA Women's World Cup)
- Season: 272,496 (2025 NSL)

Women's soccer is not traditionally a major mainstream sport in Canada, but the sport has been growing since the end of the 20th century. Up to 85,000 girls participate in soccer, which is 41% of all youth in the country. The Canadian Soccer Association is the governing body for the sport, responsible for overseeing the Canadian women's national team, as well as professional and amateur leagues in the country. The Northern Super League is the top level of professional women's soccer in Canada.

== History ==
Women's soccer was first introduced in Canada in 1922.

In 1986, the Canadian Soccer Association designed a women's soccer program in preparation for the 1988 FIFA Women's Invitation Tournament in China. Canada reached the quarterfinals of the tournament, losing 1–0 to Sweden. Canada's first major tournament win was the 1998 CONCACAF Women's Championship tournament, which was hosted in Canada. In 2015, Canada hosted the FIFA Women's World Cup.

Also in 2015, League1 Ontario debuted as the first pro-am women's soccer league in Canada. As of 2024, it is one of four of such leagues under the League1 Canada umbrella. In 2025, the Northern Super League began, marking the debut of professional soccer in Canada.

== National teams ==
The senior women's national soccer team is one of the best in the world and has regularly been ranked in the top-ten since 2011. The national team enjoyed more success and greater mainstream support than their male counterparts during the 2010s.

The senior women's national soccer team's best achievement is gaining a gold medal at the 2020 Olympics, defeating Sweden.

== Club soccer ==
In 2025, the Northern Super League played its first season. It was the first professional women's league in Canada and the first national league, with six teams from across the country. There are five regional pro-am leagues: Ontario Premier League, Ligue1 Québec, Alberta Premier League, Prairies Premier League, and British Columbia Premier League. The Ontario Premier League was the first to debut, in 2015.

From 2013 to 2021, some Canadian national team players had their salaries partially paid by the CSA and other federal government athlete funding programs to play in the National Women's Soccer League in the United States. The exact proportion of salaries paid by the CSA was negotiated with NWSL teams. Unsubsidized Canadian players could also play in the league as part of the international quota while others play in Europe. Canadian players play in the NWSL although all franchises are located in the U.S.; no Canadian franchises play in this U.S.-based league. Financial remuneration varies in the NWSL; the four-month-long league is new as of 2013 and salaries for unsubsidized players are not high enough to support them without other outside income.

== Women’s soccer and Canada’s challenges ==
Research on women in soccer has examined gender relations at the nexus of identity, sexuality, race, and ethnicity through studies of players, coaches, administrators, and supporters.

While acknowledging the accomplishments of sportswomen, these studies also highlight the ongoing challenges faced by female soccer players. This is partially a reflection of soccer's historical standing outside of North America, where it is recognized as a national sport and enculturation site in addition to being a significant location for the social construction and performance of masculine identities. Women's participation in soccer is undervalued in environments where it simultaneously reinforces and reproduces nationalism and masculinity.

== See also ==
- Soccer in Canada
