= Saskatchewan Soccer Association =

- Formation: 1906; 120 years ago
- Location: Regina, Saskatchewan, Canada
- President: Lisa Bagonluri
- Executive Director: Rahim Mohamed
- Parent organization: Canadian Soccer Association
- Website: https://www.sasksoccer.com/

Saskatchewan Soccer Association (SSA) is the governing body for soccer (Association Football) in the Canadian province of Saskatchewan. The association was formed in 1905.

== History of Soccer in Saskatchewan ==
When European colonists came to Saskatchewan in the late 1800s, soccer was incorporated to the area by them. The first game was played in Prince Albert on June 28, 1889. The Saskatchewan Soccer Association was formed in Grenfell, Saskatchewan on Good Friday in 1906. A number of exhibition matches against teams from Britain, combined with inner-city matches and the annual match between those of English and those of Scottish heritage in Saskatoon, Saskatchewan, helped keep soccer in the provincial spotlight.

Ain increase in participation began during the 1950s and then in the 1960s with the inclusion of Saskatchewan teams in the newly formed Western Canadian Soccer League. Throughout the 1970s and 1980s, Saskatchewan soccer experienced continual expansion. This boom was prevalent in several communities such as Moose Jaw, Prince Albert and Yorkton.

Development of women's soccer in Saskatchewan began in the 1980's through the 90's. There was also an increase in female involvement off the playing field as more women became involved in coaching, officiating and administering the game.

The Regional Training Centre was opened in Saskatoon in 1986 and it has been utilized for a number of teams, including the Western Canada Games team in 1987, the Canada Summer Games team in 1989, the Women's All-Stars and the University of Saskatchewan teams.

During the 1990s soccer became an all year-round sport as multimillion-dollar facilities were built throughout Saskatchewan. Soccer centers could be found in Regina, Saskatoon, Yorkton and Lloydminster. More indoor soccer facilities were built in Warman and Moose Jaw in the first decade of the 21st century, and registrations increased to over 42,000 players participating in the sport of soccer in 2013.

The SSA operates the Saskatchewan Premier Soccer League: the highest level of amateur soccer competition in the province. Furthermore, it operates, in partnership with Lakeland College and the Meridian Youth Soccer Association (Lloydminster), The Rivers West Centre of Excellence.

The SSA is a member organization of the national sport governing body, the Canadian Soccer Association, and fields a pair of men's and women's teams, known as Saskatchewan EXCEL, that compete in the Prairies Premier League.

=== Members ===
The following organizations are members of the Saskatchewan Soccer Association:

==== Regular members ====
- Astra Soccer Academy
- Battlefords Youth Soccer
- Battlefords Senior Soccer Association
- Briercrest College and Seminary
- Broadview Soccer
- Canora Soccer
- Choiceland Soccer
- Dundurn Community Association
- Esterhazy Soccer
- Estevan Senior Soccer Association
- Estevan Youth Soccer Association
- Futbol Club Regina
- Grenfell Soccer
- Humboldt and District Soccer Association
- Ile a la Crosse Friendship Centre
- JJ Soccer
- Kindersley Minor Soccer Association
- Kipling Soccer
- La Loche Minor Sports
- Lac La Ronge Tri-Community Soccer Association
- Langenburg United Soccer Organization
- Lanigan & District Soccer
- Lloydminster & District Soccer Association
- Meadow Lake Senior Soccer
- Meadow Lake & District Youth Soccer
- Melfort Youth Soccer Association
- Melville Soccer
- Meridian Youth Soccer Association
- Montmartre Soccer
- Moose Jaw Youth Soccer Association
- Moose Mountain Soccer
- Moosomin Soccer
- Nipawin Indoor Soccer
- Nipawin Outdoor Soccer
- Oxbow Soccer
- Poundmaker Youth Soccer
- Prince Albert Youth Soccer Association
- Prince Albert Senior Soccer Association
- Qu'Appelle Valley Soccer Association
- Queen City United Soccer
- Redvers Soccer Club
- Rocanville Soccer
- Rosetown Soccer Association
- Saskatoon Adult Soccer Inc
- Saskatoon Youth Soccer Inc.
- Shaunavon Soccer
- Springside Minor Sports
- Stoughton Soccer Club
- Swift Current Soccer Association
- TDSoccer
- Tisdale Soccer
- Town of Eston
- Valley Soccer Association
- Vibank Soccer
- Watson Minor Sports
- Watrous and District Association
- Wawota Soccer
- Weyburn Soccer Association
- Whitewood Soccer
- Wolseley Soccer
- Wynyard Soccer
- Yorkton Soccer Association

==== Associate members ====
- Phantom Lake Soccer Club, MB
- Regina Referees Association
- Saskatoon & District Referees Association
- University of Regina
- University of Saskatchewan

== David Newsham Award Winners ==
The Saskatchewan Soccer Association (SSA) also recognizes participants (coaches, athletes, referees, volunteers, etc.) in sport of soccer on an annual basis. The premier award for dedication to the sport of soccer in the province of Saskatchewan is the David Newsham Award.

David Newsham was an athlete and leader in the Saskatchewan soccer community and was instrumental in the development of soccer in the province of Saskatchewan.

The David Newsham Award is presented to an individual who has demonstrated exceptional volunteer service to the sport of soccer as well as an outstanding effort as well as dedication in their role as a coach, administrator or official.

Award Winners by Year:

Year	Winner
1985	Henk Ruys
1986	Doug Knott
1987	Cedric Gillott
1988	Raymond Jones
1989	Hank Koopman
1990	Bill Kerr
1991	Not Awarded
1992	Ross Wilson
1993	Klaas Post
1994	Paul Caves
1995	David Herbert
1996	Ken Billows
1997	Andy Sharpe
1998	Ed Horn
1999	David Jenkins
2000	Tom Wieclawski
2001	Al Day
2002	Bob Maltman
2003	Dale Perry
2004	Percy Hoff
2005	Bob Rohachuk
2006	Jim Nicholson
2007	Esther Dupperon
2008	Bruce Cowan
2009	John Leyshon
2010	Rob Newman
2011	Brett Mario
2012	Huw Morris
2013	David Jenkins
2014	Jeannette Kuc
2015	Don Findlay
2016	Mark Lord
2017	Rob Kroeker
2018	Gord Quinlan
2019	Hung Tan Duong
2020	Leslie Blyth
2021	Leonard Lewko
