= St. Vital Park =

Regional park in St. Vital (Winnipeg), Canada

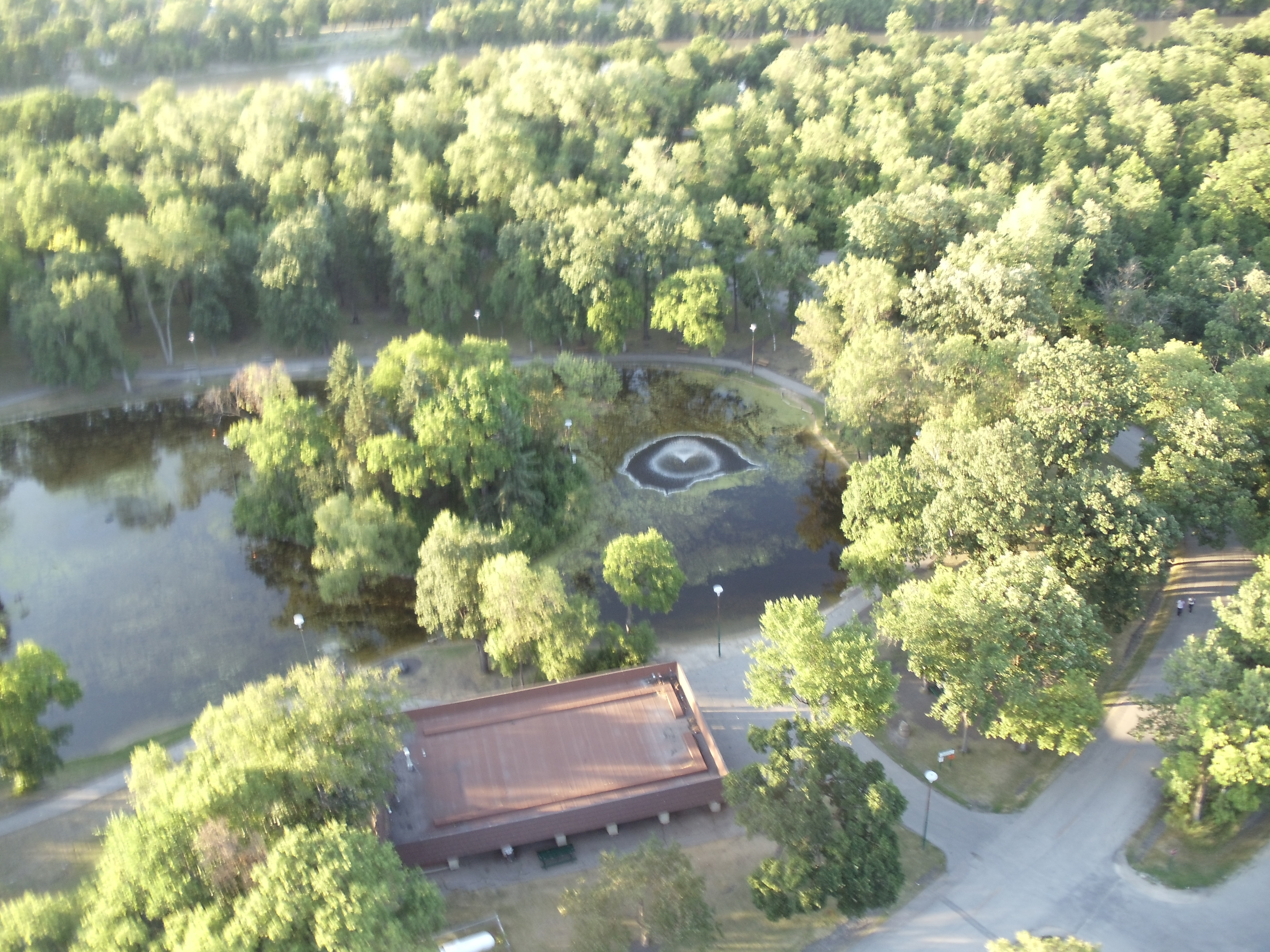
- Interactive map of St. Vital Park
- Location: 190 River Road; Winnipeg, Manitoba, R2M 5C4; Canada
- Coordinates: 49.8285°N 97.1404°W
- Area: 100 acres (40 ha)
- Established: 1929
- Public transit: Winnipeg Transit; 676 101

St. Vital Park (French: Parc de Saint-Vital) is a 100-acre (40 ha) park in southern Winnipeg, Manitoba, located on a bend of the Red River. In winter months, a skating pond is situated near the pathways which cover the area. St. Vital Park is also a popular area chosen to have events such as weddings and picnics. It is the third largest park in the city.

St. Vital Park is home to many birds throughout the spring, summer, and autumn months, including ducks (mallards, wood ducks), Canada geese, crows, etc. Chickadees and blue jays are seen throughout the year. Occasionally one may glimpse the deer that reside here. The park is popular with dog walkers, joggers, and community sports teams. The park also includes two playgrounds for the younger and older children to enjoy.

Starting in 2026, Memorial Park Turf Field at Saint Vital Memorial Park became the home field for the Bonivital Flames. Both the men's and women's teams host their games here in the Canadian Prairies Premier League.

== History ==
St. Vital Park was first developed in May 1929. The first works were in clearing the property and paving roads. It opened later.
