= Premier Soccer Leagues Canada =

Canadian soccer league

- Founded: March 31, 2022; 4 years ago
- First season: 2022
- Country: Canada
- Confederation: CONCACAF
- Divisions: 5
- Number of clubs: 46 clubs (men); 44 clubs (women) (Note: Top-division teams only.)
- Level on pyramid: 3 (Note: There are no tier-2 leagues or clubs in Canada. PSLC is effectively the second highest level of soccer in the Canadian league system.) (Note: Ontario Premier League and LS Pro have their own three-tier league system. However, Canada Soccer sanctions the entire OPL and L1QC systems as being in the third division of the Canadian soccer league system, despite the internal promotion and relegation structure.)
- Domestic cup(s): Canadian Championship; W Canadian Championship
- League cup: Inter-Provincial Championship (women)
- International cups: CONCACAF Champions Cup (Note: Men's PSLC teams can qualify for the CONCACAF Champions Cup through the Canadian Championship.); CONCACAF W Champions Cup (Note: Women's PSLC teams can qualify for the CONCACAF W Champions Cup through the W Canadian Championship.)
- Broadcaster(s): OneSoccer (select matches)
- Website: premiersoccerleagues.ca
- Current: 2026 Premier Soccer Leagues Canada season

The Premier Soccer Leagues Canada (PSLC; French: Premières Ligues de soccer du Canada, PLSC) is a national pro–am soccer organization in Canada. It consists of five regional leagues; the Alberta Premier League, British Columbia Premier League, Ontario Premier League, Prairies Premier League, and LS Pro (Quebec), with each league operating men's and women's divisions. PSLC is overseen by Canadian Soccer Media & Entertainment (formerly Canada Soccer Business), in partnership with participating provincial member federations.

Originally founded as League1 Canada in 2022, PSLC is the third tier of the Canadian soccer league system which is the highest level of pro–am soccer in the country. It is below the Canadian Premier League and Northern Super League which are the nation's top-tier professional leagues. Winners of each men's regional premier league gain entry to the Canadian Championship the following season, from which they may qualify for the CONCACAF Champions Cup; winners of each women's regional premier league gain entry of the Women's Inter-Provincial Championship from which the winner advances to the CONCACAF W Champions Cup.

== History ==
In 2011, the Première ligue de soccer du Québec was established to begin play in 2012, marking the return of semi-professional soccer in the province of Quebec. In 2013, League1 Ontario was founded as a semi-professional league by the Ontario Soccer Association to begin play in 2014 with a men's division, followed by a women's division in 2015. After multiple years of consideration, League1 British Columbia began play in 2022 in both the male and female divisions.

On March 31, 2022, League1 Canada was announced as an alliance of the three existing division three pro-am leagues, aligning the national soccer pathway. L1O and L1BC adopted new logos that day, while the PLSQ transitioned to a common logo and rebranded to Ligue1 Québec in 2023. Dino Rossi became the first League1 Canada president in May 2022.

From August 12 to 14, 2022, the inaugural Women's Inter-Provincial Championship was held in Laval, Quebec. The competition was a four-team knockout tournament featuring the champions of each of the three divisions, as well as an additional team from the PLSQ (allocated as host). A.S. Blainville won the inaugural title. The 2023 tournament was held in British Columbia.

In March 2023, League1 Alberta was announced with a five-team exhibition series to be played that summer. The league launched officially in 2024 season with eight teams participating in the inaugural season. In June 2023, League1 Prairies was announced with plans for the league to operate between Manitoba and Saskatchewan; the league initially planned to launch for the 2025 season. Similarly in early 2023, League1 Canada also announced exploring expanding with a multi-provincial League1 Atlantic for Atlantic Canada in March 2023, but a timeframe for its formal expansion was not announced. An annual showcase tournament, known as the Maritime Super Series, began play in 2023 as a stepping stone towards the formation of a formal league.

On December 7, 2023, League1 Canada announced it had reached an agreement with the Alberta Soccer Association to add League1 Alberta to its national alliance of Division III pro-am leagues. Later that week, Dino Rossi resigned from his role as League1 Canada president.

In November 2025, the Saskatchewan Soccer Association announced plans to run a League1 Prairies exhibition series in 2026 which will lead to launching a full league in 2028. Clubs from Saskatchewan and Manitoba would participate in the competition.

In January 2026, the Prairies Premier League was announced alongside a rebranding from League1 Canada to Premier Soccer Leagues Canada.

== Regional competitions ==
=== Leagues ===
Each member league determines their own season format and schedules. As of 2026, each regional premier league determined their champions via regular season standings.

Logo	League	Men's division			Women's division		
Logo	League	First season	Teams	Current winner	First season	Teams	Current winner
	Alberta	2024	8	Edmonton BTB SC (2026)	2024	8	Calgary Wild FC U23 (2026)
	British Columbia	2022	8	Langley United (2026)	2022	8	Vancouver Rise FC Academy (2026)
	Ontario	2014	12 (Note: Only includes teams in the highest division.)	Scrosoppi FC (2026)	2015	10	Simcoe County Rovers FC (2026)
	Prairies	2026	6	Thunder Bay Chill (2026)	2026	6	Bonivital Flames (2026)
	Quebec (Note: Unlike the other four PSL Canada member leagues, which adopted unified "Premier League" branding aligned with Canadian Soccer Media & Entertainment in January 2026, LS Pro retained its own identity and operates independently of CSME.)	2012	12	FC Laval (2026)	2018	12	A.S. Blainville (2026)

=== League cups ===
Not to be confused with a league's playoff phase.

Cup	Men's division		Women's division	
Cup	First season	Current winner	First season	Current winner
(Ontario) OPL Cup	2014	Woodbridge Strikers (2026)	2015	Guelph United FC (2026)
(Quebec) Coupe L1QC	2013	A.S. Blainville (2025)	2021	PEF Québec (2023) (Note: The women's Coupe L1QC was not played in 2024)

=== Other secondary competitions ===
Cup	First season	Current winner (Note: Trophy is awarded to the club with the most combined points acquired in the regular season by their men's and women's teams.)
(British Columbia) Juan de Fuca Plate	2022 (Note: Trophy was awarded from 2012–2014 and 2017–2019 to men's Premier Development League teams in British Columbia. The trophy only became affiliated with League1 BC in 2022.)	Whitecaps FC Academy (2026)

== Inter-provincial competitions ==
=== Women ===
The Women's Inter-Provincial Championship is a four-team knockout tournament organized by PSLC. It is contested annually by the four regional premier league champions. The tournament is held over a single weekend at the end of the season and determines a national champion. The winners of the 2023 and 2024 tournaments qualified for the following year's CONCACAF W Champions Cup.

Cup	First season	Current winner
(Canada) Women's Inter-Provincial Championship	2022	(Ontario) Simcoe County Rovers FC (2025)

=== Men ===
The winners of the men's regional premier leagues qualify for the following year's Canadian Championship. There were plans for a Men's Inter-Provincial Championship to begin in 2024. From 2014 to 2016, prior to the formation of League1 Canada, the winners of L1ON and L1QC participated in a similar competition known as the Inter-Provincial Cup.

== See also ==
- Canadian soccer league system
- Inter-Provincial Cup (soccer) – a defunct super cup competition between the Ontario and Quebec champions
- National Premier Leagues – a grouping of Australian regional soccer leagues
- Canadian Hockey League
