= Bonivital Flames =

- Full name: Bonivital Soccer Club
- Founded: 1979
- Stadium: Memorial Park Turf Field at St. Vital Park
- Chairman: Kevin Dick
- Head coach: Jean-Baptiste Pierazzi (men); Tonya Derkson (women)
- League: Prairies Premier League
- 2026: 1st (Women); 3rd (Men)
- Website: www.bonivitalsoccer.com
Home colours	Away colours

Bonivital Soccer Club, commonly known as the Bonvital Flames, is a Canadian semi-professional soccer club based in Winnipeg, Manitoba that competes in the men's and women's division of the Prairies Premier League.

== History ==
In 1979, the club was founded, as the St. Boniface-St. Vital Soccer Association, as a youth soccer club to serve the south-east Winnipeg community. The club plays at a turf field installed at St. Vital Memorial Park, which was originally built as a training facility for the 2015 FIFA Women's World Cup. In October 2017, the club's U17 boys team, won the Canadian national championship. In August 2021, they became a youth partner club of profession Canadian Premier League side Valour FC.

In 2026, they became one of the founding members of the semi-pro Prairies Premier League. On May 10, the women's team played in the inaugural league match, where they were defeated by Lucania FC 3–0. The men played their first match the following week, where they were defeated 1–0 by the Thunder Bay Chill.

The Bonivital women's team were the Prairies Premier League's first champion in 2026, earning 20 points from their 10 games during their inaugural season led by attacking mid-fielder and former Manitoba Bisons captain Jessica Tsai.

== Seasons ==
Men

Season	League	Teams	Record	Rank	Playoffs	Canadian Championship	Ref
2026	Prairies Premier League	6	4–3–3	3rd	Not held	Did not qualify	

Women

Season	League	Teams	Record	Rank	Playoffs	W Canadian Championship	Ref
2026	Prairies Premier League	6	6–2–2	1st	Not held		
