= Winnipeg Lucania FC =

- Short name: Lucania FC
- Founded: 1971
- Stadium: Ralph Cantafio Soccer Complex
- Capacity: 2,000
- League: Prairies Premier League
- 2026: TBD
Home colours	Away colours

Winnipeg Lucania Football Club is an amateur soccer club based in Winnipeg, Manitoba. It was founded in 1971 by Italo-Canadians, who named the club after Muro Lucano in Southern Italy. They won gold at the Canadian National Challenge Cup on two occasions, in 1987 and 2000. The club was ranked the number one senior men's amateur team in Canada on June 22, 2011. The team joined the third-tier Prairies Premier League in 2026, fielding a women's side only.

== Seasons ==
Women

Season	League	Teams	Record	Rank	Playoffs	W Canadian Championship	Ref
2026	Prairies Premier League	6	2–3–5	6th	Not held	Not eligible	

== Honours ==
Canadian National Challenge Cup

- Gold Medal – 1987, 2000
- 3rd place – 1989, 1991, 1997

MSA Cup

- Champion – 1987, 1991, 1994, 1997, 1999, 2000, 2001, 2004, 2005, 2006, 2010, 2026

Manitoba Major Soccer League

- Champion – 2008

Molson Super Soccer Alliance

- Champion – 1991
