= FC Manitoba =

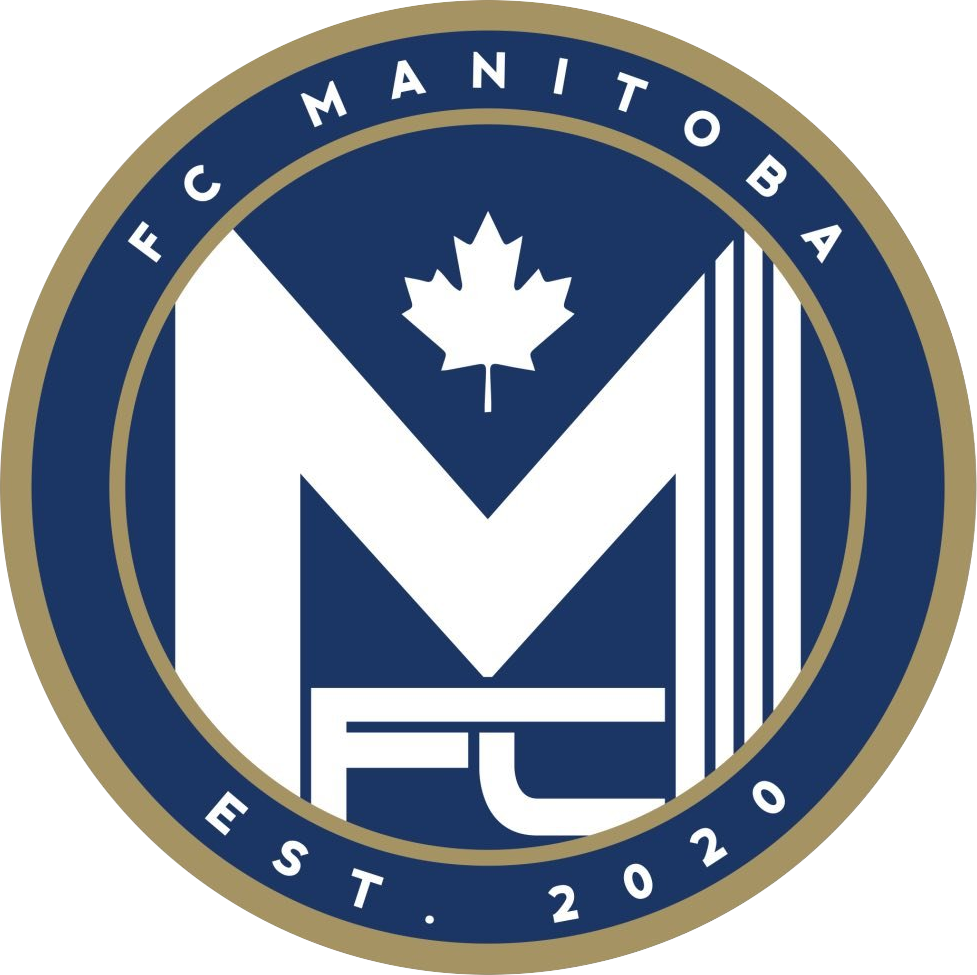
- Full name: Football Club Manitoba
- Founded: 2010 (as WSA Winnipeg); 2020 (as FC Manitoba)
- Stadium: Ralph Cantafio Soccer Complex; Winnipeg, Manitoba
- Capacity: 2,000
- Owners: FC Manitoba Inc. (Garcea Group of Companies)
- League: Prairies Premier League
- 2026: TBD
Home colours	Away colours

FC Manitoba is a Canadian soccer team based in Winnipeg, Manitoba. The club was founded in 2010 as WSA Winnipeg. In 2020, the club was acquired by a new ownership group and re-organized and branded as FC Manitoba. The teams plays in the Prairies Premier League, in the third tier of the Canadian soccer pyramid. The team played in USL League Two, part of the United States soccer league system, from 2011 until 2023.

The team plays its home games at the Ralph Cantafio Soccer Complex on the FIFA-approved synthetic grass of the complex's John Scouras Field. The team's colours are navy, gold, and white.

== History ==
=== WSA Winnipeg ===
Crest of WSA Winnipeg (2010–2019)

The World Soccer Academy was founded in 2001 in Winnipeg as a youth soccer academy by Eduardo Badescu.

In December 2010, WSA Winnipeg created a semi-professional team to participate in the US-based Premier Development League to begin play in the 2011 season. This marked the return of high level soccer to the city of Winnipeg since the Winnipeg Fury of the original Canadian Soccer League ceased operations in 1993. The club was supported by Mondetta, a well-recognized brand in Canadian professional sports, as one of its primary sponsors. The team primarily fielded rosters built around local talent.

They played their debut match on May 28, 2011, against the Thunder Bay Chill, losing 1–0. They got their first win the next day in a rematch versus the Chill, winning 3–0. The first goal in franchise history was scored by Kenny Sacramento. In their first season, they played an exhibition match against Italian Serie A club AS Roma.

=== FC Manitoba ===
In January 2020, the team was purchased by the Garcea Group of Companies and renamed FC Manitoba, while revamping the entire development system of the club, separating from the World Soccer Academy. The team also received new colours and a new logo. The new team's debut season in 2020 was cancelled due to the COVID-19 pandemic. In September 2020, they signed former Serie A player Michele Paolucci to a contract. Due to the travel restrictions as a result of the continuing pandemic, the team opted out of the 2021 USL League Two season as well. Instead, in 2021, they participated in the 2021 Summer Series with other Canadian semi-professional and amateur clubs. FC Manitoba returned to USL2 for the 2022 and 2023 seasons, before going dormant in 2024. The club will be revived in 2026, joining the third-tier Prairies Premier League.

== Year-by-year ==
Men's

Year	League	Record	Regular season	Playoffs	Canadian Championship	Reference
WSA Winnipeg
2011	PDL	3–1–12	6th, Heartland	did not qualify	Not eligible	
2012	PDL	3–5–8	6th, Heartland	did not qualify	Not eligible	
2013	PDL	3–2–9	7th, Heartland	did not qualify	Not eligible	
2014	PDL	2–2–10	5th, Heartland	did not qualify	Not eligible	
2015	PDL	0–2–12	6th, Heartland	did not qualify	Not eligible	
2016	PDL	1–2–11	6th, Heartland	did not qualify	Not eligible	
2017	PDL	2–1–11	6th, Heartland	did not qualify	Not eligible	
2018	PDL	0–0–14	6th, Heartland	did not qualify	Not eligible	
2019	USL2	0–1–13	6th, Heartland	did not qualify	Not eligible	
FC Manitoba
2020	USL2	season cancelled due to the COVID-19 pandemic			Not eligible	
2021	USL2	did not play due to COVID-19 pandemic travel restrictions			Not eligible	
2022	USL2	4–2–6	4th, Deep North	did not qualify	Not eligible	
2023	USL2	5–4–3	3rd, Deep North	did not qualify	Not eligible	
2024	Did not compete					
2025	Did not compete					
2026	PPL	4–1–5	5th	Not held	Did not qualify	

Women's

Year	League	Record	Regular season	Playoffs	W Canadian Championship	Reference
2026	PPL	4–3–3	3rd	Not held	Did not qualify	

== Head coaches ==
- Eduardo Badescu (2011–2019)
- Tony Mazza (2020)
- Jose Borg (2021–2022)
- Walter Obregón (2023)

== Notable former players ==
The following players have either played at the professional or international level, either before or after playing for the PDL/USL2 team:

- (Canada) Tyson Farago
- (Canada) Kyle Hiebert
- (Somalia) (Canada) Ali Musse
- (Namibia) Maleagi Ngarizemo
- (Ghana) Raphael Ohin
- (Italy) Michele Paolucci

== Affiliate team ==
FC Manitoba also operates an affiliate team, Ital-Inter SC, in Premier Division of the Manitoba Major Soccer League.

== Women's team ==
In 2021, they announced that they would be creating a women's team. They were set to join the semi-professional US-based Women's Premier Soccer League.
