= Forza Soccer Academy =

Soccer club in Saskatoon, Saskatchewan

- Founded: 2021; 5 years ago
- League: Prairies Premier League
- Website: https://www.forzasocceracademy.ca/
Home colours

Forza Soccer Academy is a Canadian semi-professional soccer club based in Saskatoon, Saskatchewan that competes in the men's division of the Prairies Premier League.

== History ==
Forza Soccer Academy was founded in 2021. In 2026, they joined the newly formed Prairies Premier League, entering the men's division.

== Seasons ==
Season	League	Teams	Record	Rank	Playoffs	Canadian Championship	Ref
2026	Prairies Premier League	6	0–1–9	6th	Not held	did not qualify	
