= Ralph Cantafio Soccer Complex =

Sporting venue in Winnipeg, Canada

- Interactive map of Ralph Cantafio Soccer Complex
- Former names: Winnipeg Soccer Complex (1991–2016)
- Address: 900 Waverley St
- Location: Winnipeg, Manitoba, Canada
- Coordinates: 49.8435°N 97.1777°W
- Operator: Winnipeg Soccer Federation
- Capacity: Field #1: 2,000 (current); 4,500, including 900 standing (planned); Field #2: 750
- Surface: Turf
- Field size: 68m x 105m

Construction
- Opened: 1991
- Expanded: 2027

Tenants
- FC Manitoba (PPL) (2011–2023, 2026–present); Winnipeg Lucania FC (PPL) (2026–present); Winnipeg Ember FC (NSL) (2027–present)

Website
- Website

The Ralph Cantafio Soccer Complex, originally known as the Winnipeg Soccer Complex, is a multi-use stadium in Winnipeg, Manitoba. It is used mostly for soccer matches, including for the Prairies Premier League. The main pitch holds approximately 2,000 spectators, but will expand to 4,500 once a new soccer-dedicated stadium is built by April 2027.

The complex was renamed on June 12, 2016, in honour of Ralph Cantafio, a local soccer executive and pioneer for the sport in the province of Manitoba. Cantafio died 10 years later, at the age of 97, on March 9, 2026.

The Ralph Cantafio Soccer Complex features two synthetic fields: John Scouras Field #1, and Field #2. Both fields have spectator bleachers and team shelters. The clubhouse contains four dressing rooms, referee rooms, public washrooms, and an open common area. There is an on-site press box, sound system, and scoreboard on John Scouras Field #1, which seats approximately 2,000. Field #2 seats approximately 750.

In the past, the complex hosted matches for the Canada men's national soccer team. It hosted the 1999 Pan American Games. It was a practice facility for the Canada and United States women’s national teams in 2013, as well as for multiple teams during the 2015 FIFA Women's World Cup. It hosted the 2017 Canada Summer Games as well as the 2025 National Masters Championship.

The complex has consistently been used for amateur soccer in Winnipeg. Beginning in 2026, FC Manitoba and Winnipeg Lucania FC of the Prairies Premier League host matches at the complex. Upon the conclusion of their first season, the Government of Manitoba announced funding to replace the outdoor field pitch and lighting system.

A soccer-dedicated stadium is set to be built on site by April 2027, increasing capacity from 2,000 to 4,500. This was jointed funded by the Northern Super League (NSL) along with municipal, provincial, and federal governments, with the purpose of supporting Winnipeg Ember FC joining the NSL in 2027.
