= Prairies Premier League =

Canadian soccer league founded in 2026

- Organising body: Manitoba Soccer Association; Saskatchewan Soccer Association
- Founded: 2026
- First season: 2026
- Country: Canada
- Confederation: CONCACAF
- Number of clubs: 7
- Level on pyramid: 3
- Current champions: Thunder Bay Chill (men); Bonivital Flames (women) (2026)
- Website: https://pplsoccer.ca/
- Current: 2026 Prairies Premier League season

The Prairies Premier League (PPL) is a semi-professional men's and women's soccer league in the Canadian Prairies, featuring teams from Saskatchewan, Manitoba, and Northern Ontario. The league is organized jointly by the Manitoba Soccer Association and the Saskatchewan Soccer Association and is sanctioned by the Canadian Soccer Association as a third division pro–am league in the Canadian soccer league system.

The PPL is part of Premier Soccer Leagues Canada (PSLC), the national third tier with other regional divisions in Alberta, British Columbia, Ontario, and Quebec. Once the league is fully instituted, the men's league champion is expected to qualify for the Canadian Championship, the domestic cup championship, while the women's league champion is expected to qualify for the W Canadian Championship.

== History ==
In 2021, a group of clubs from British Columbia, Alberta, and Manitoba organized the 2021 Summer Series, a series of friendly soccer matches played between Western Canadian soccer clubs to showcase a potential national second division. In 2022, another exhibition showcase was organized by four clubs—three from Alberta and one from Manitoba (FC Manitoba)—as an entity known as Central League1. This was followed by the creation of League1 Alberta in 2023.

In June 2023, League1 Canada publicly announced that planning for a League1 Prairies was underway. The proposed league would include clubs from Manitoba and Saskatchewan and was planned to launch for the 2025 season. In November 2025, the Saskatchewan Soccer Association announced plans to run a League1 Prairies exhibition series in 2026 which will lead to launching a full league in 2028.

On January 27, 2026, the league was officially announced as the Prairies Premier League. The announcement coincided with a rebranding of Premier Soccer Leagues Canada (formerly League1 Canada) and its other member leagues. The PPL debuted on May 10, 2026, with seven clubs across three provinces, with six teams in each of the men's and women's divisions.

In September 2026, the league was exploring the potential for expansion via gathering a expressions of interest for new clubs to join the league.

== Clubs ==
The league consists of three clubs from Saskatchewan, three from Manitoba, and one from Northwestern Ontario. The league had five clubs fielding both men's and women's teams in the 2026 season, along with one standalone men's team and one standalone women's team, for a total of six teams in each of the men's and women's divisions.

Prairies Prairies Premier League Metro Area

Winnipeg Prairies Premier League

As of 2026 season

Team	City	Stadium	Capacity	Founded	Debut	Male	Female
Current teams
Bonivital Flames	Winnipeg, MB	St. Vital Memorial Park		1979	2026	Yes	Yes
FC Manitoba	Winnipeg, MB	Ralph Cantafio Soccer Complex	2,000	2010	2026	Yes	Yes
Forza Soccer Academy	Saskatoon, SK	Saskatoon Minor Football Field	5,000	1921	2026	Yes	No
Queen City United SC	Regina, SK	Leibel Field	1,200	1987	2026	Yes	Yes
Saskatchewan EXCEL	Saskatoon, SK	Saskatoon Minor Football Field	5,000	2026	2026	Yes	Yes
Thunder Bay Chill	Thunder Bay, ON	Chapples Park	2,000	2000	2026	Yes	Yes
Winnipeg Lucania FC	Winnipeg, MB	Ralph Cantafio Soccer Complex	2,000	1971	2026	No	Yes

== Seasons ==
Season	Teams	League champions	
Season	Teams	Men's division	Women's division
2026	6	Thunder Bay Chill	Bonivital Flames
