= Queen City United SC =

Soccer club in Regina, Saskatchewan

- Full name: Queen City United Soccer Club
- Founded: 1987; 39 years ago
- League: Prairies Premier League
- Website: https://www.qcsoccer.ca/
Home colours

Queen City United Soccer Club is a Canadian semi-professional soccer club based in Regina, Saskatchewan that competes in the men's and women's division of the Prairies Premier League.

== History ==
The club was founded as a youth soccer club in 1987, through a merger between the Regina Spurs and the Regina Steelers. In 2019, the club entered a women's semi-pro team in the US-based United Women's Soccer, becoming the second Canadian franchise in the league after Calgary Foothills WFC. On June 29, 2019, they recorded their first victory, defeating the Colorado Pride 2-1. In 2022, the club began the first team in Regina to receive a National Youth Club License from the Canadian Soccer Association.

In 2026, they joined the newly formed Prairies Premier League, entering both men's and women's teams.

== Seasons ==
Women

Season	League	Division	Teams	Record	Rank	Playoffs	W Canadian Championship	Ref
2019	United Women's Soccer	West Conference	5	2–0–6	4th	did not qualify	N/A	
2026	Prairies Premier League	—N/a	6	2–4–4	5th	—N/a	Not eligible	

Men

Season	League	Teams	Record	Rank	Playoffs	Canadian Championship	Ref
2026	Prairies Premier League	6	5–3–2	2nd	—N/a	Not eligible	
