= 2026–27 W Canadian Championship =

Tournament details
- Country: Canada
- Dates: August 3, 2026 – May 2027
- Teams: 8

Tournament statistics
- Matches played: 4
- Goals scored: 13 (3.25 per match)
- Attendance: 8,476 (2,119 per match)
- Top goal scorer(s): Mya Jones; Jordyn Rhodes (2 goals each)
- All statistics correct as of October 4, 2026.

The 2026–27 W Canadian Championship is the first edition of the W Canadian Championship, replacing the Women's Inter-Provincial Championship as the national women's soccer knockout competition in Canada. The winner will qualify for the 2027 CONCACAF W Champions Cup.

== Format ==
Eight teams are participating across three knockout rounds starting with the quarter-finals featuring all six teams from the Northern Super League (NSL) and two clubs from Premier Soccer Leagues Canada.

The quarter-finals were held in August and October 2026. Two of the four quarter-final matches were between NSL teams, and were previously scheduled league matches that also counted for the tournament.

A draw for the semi-finals and final will be held in early 2027. The semi-finals will take place in April 2027 and the final will take place on Victoria Day weekend, May 21–24, 2027. Each matchup throughout the tournament consists of a single leg and will feature extra time and, if required, a penalty shoot-out to resolve ties.

== Teams ==
All six Northern Super League are participating, as are the winner and runner up of the 2025 Inter-Provincial Championship.

League	Team	Location
Northern Super League	Calgary Wild FC	Calgary, Alberta
Northern Super League	Halifax Tides FC	Halifax, Nova Scotia
Northern Super League	Montreal Roses FC	Laval, Quebec
Northern Super League	Ottawa Rapid FC	Ottawa, Ontario
Northern Super League	AFC Toronto	Toronto, Ontario
Northern Super League	Vancouver Rise FC	Burnaby, British Columbia
Ontario Premier League	Simcoe County Rovers FC	Barrie, Ontario
LS Pro Féminin	CS Mont-Royal Outremont	Mount Royal, Quebec

== Schedule ==
Round	Dates
Quarter-finals	August 3, 5 and 12; October 4
Semi-finals	April 2027
Final	May 21–24, 2027

== Bracket ==
Quarter-finals
August 3, 2026 – Halifax
NSL Halifax Tides FC	2
NSL Ottawa Rapid FC (a.e.t.)	3
August 5, 2026 – Foothills County
NSL Calgary Wild FC	4
LS Pro CS Mont-Royal Outremont	0
August 12, 2026 – Laval
NSL Montreal Roses FC	0
OPL Simcoe County Rovers FC	1
October 4, 2026 – Toronto
NSL AFC Toronto (a.e.t.)	2
NSL Vancouver Rise FC	1

Semi-finals
April 2027
April 2027

Final
May 2027

== Quarter-finals ==
=== Summary ===
Home team	Score	Away team
Halifax Tides FC	2–3 (a.e.t.)	Ottawa Rapid FC
Calgary Wild FC	4–0	CS Mont-Royal Outremont
Montreal Roses FC	0–1	Simcoe County Rovers FC
AFC Toronto	2–1 (a.e.t.)	Vancouver Rise FC

=== Matches ===
August 3, 2026
3:00 pm ADT

Halifax Tides FC	2–3 (a.e.t.)	Ottawa Rapid FC
Rhodes 49', 62'		Belzile 83'; Wilkinson 90+2'; Golen 107'

Wanderers Grounds, Halifax
Attendance: 4,049 (Note: Canada Soccer report states attendance of 4,049, but NSL report states attendance of 3,682.)
Referee: Myriam Marcotte
August 5, 2026
7:00 pm MDT

Calgary Wild FC	4–0	CS Mont-Royal Outremont
Jones 30', 47'; Otto 54'; Thurton 85'

ATCO Field, Foothills County
Attendance: 1,124
Referee: Alain Ruch
August 12, 2026
6:00 pm EDT

Montreal Roses FC	0–1	Simcoe County Rovers FC
		Schaffer 2'

Stade Boréale, Laval
Attendance: 608
Referee: Salma Flores-Desrochers
October 4, 2026
1:00 pm EDT

AFC Toronto	2–1 (a.e.t.)	Vancouver Rise FC
Silano 19'; Hunter 100'		Abdu 27'

York Lions Stadium, Toronto
Attendance: 2,695
Referee: Sheila Couture

== Semi-finals ==
=== Summary ===
Home team	Score	Away team
	–	
	–	

=== Matches ===
April 2027

v

April 2027

v

== Final ==
May 2027

v

== Statistics ==
=== Top goalscorers ===
Rank	Player	Team	Goals
1	(Canada) Mya Jones	Calgary Wild FC	2
1	(United States) Jordyn Rhodes	Halifax Tides FC	2
3	Nine players		1

== See also ==
- 2026 Canadian Championship
