= 2017 Jubilee Trophy =

National Championships

Tournament details
- Country: Canada
- Date: October 4-9, 2017
- Teams: 9

Final positions
- Champions: Edmonton Victoria SC
- Runners-up: Surrey United SC

Tournament statistics
- Matches played: 18
- Goals scored: 63 (3.5 per match)
- Top goal scorer: Heather Lund 4 goals

The 2017 Jubilee Trophy (part of the Toyota National Championships for sponsorship reasons) is the national championship for women's soccer clubs in Canada. It was held in Surrey, British Columbia from October 4-9, 2017.

== Teams ==
Nine teams were granted entry into the competition; one from each Canadian province excluding Manitoba and Prince Edward Island. As host, British Columbia was permitted a second entry into the competition. This field of nine teams represents a decrease of one team from the ten sides that contested the 2016 Jubilee Trophy.

Teams are selected by their provincial soccer associations; most often qualifying by winning provincial leagues or cup championships such as the Ontario Cup.

Province	Team	Coach	Qualification
British Columbia	North Shore GSC Renegades	Sipho Sibiya	BC Soccer Women's Provincial Runners-Up
British Columbia	Surrey United SC	Spiro Pegios	BC Soccer Women's Provincial Champions
Alberta	Edmonton Victoria SC	Rick Haxby	Alberta Cup
Saskatchewan	Saskatoon SK Impact FC	Abumere Okonofua	Saskatchewan Cup
Ontario	Scarborough GS United	John Williams	Ontario Cup
Quebec	CS Mont-Royal Outremont	Lyonel Joseph	Ligue de soccer élite du Québec Playoff Champion
New Brunswick	Fredericton Picaroons Reds	Jonathan Crossland	New Brunswick Premier Soccer League
Nova Scotia	Halifax Dunbrack SC	Derek Gaudet	Nova Scotia Soccer League Premiership Cup
Newfoundland and Labrador	Holy Cross SC	Jake Stanford	Newfoundland and Labrador Jubilee Trophy

== Group stage ==
The nine teams in the competition are divided into three groups of three teams each, which then play a single-game round-robin format. At the end of group play, each team faces the equal-ranked teams from the other groups in another single-game round-robin format to determine a final classification for the tournament.

=== Group A ===
Pos	Team	Pld	W	D	L	GF	GA	GD	Pts	Qualification	NL	QC	SK
1	(Newfoundland and Labrador) Holy Cross SC	2	2	0	0	8	1	+7	6	Advance to first classification group	—	—	6–0
2	(Quebec) CS Mont-Royal Outremont	2	1	0	1	4	3	+1	3	Advance to second classification group	1–2	—	3–1
3	(Saskatchewan) Saskatoon SK Impact FC	2	0	0	2	1	9	−8	0	Advance to third classification group	—	—	—

Source: http://www.canadasoccer.com/schedule-results-s15521
Rules for classification: 1) points; 2) head-to-head record; 3) goal difference

=== Group B ===
Pos	Team	Pld	W	D	L	GF	GA	GD	Pts	Qualification	BC	NS	NB
1	(British Columbia) Surrey United SC	2	1	1	0	7	1	+6	4	Advance to first classification group	—	1–1	6–0
2	(Nova Scotia) Halifax Dunbrack SC	2	1	1	0	7	2	+5	4	Advance to second classification group	—	—	6–1
3	(New Brunswick) Fredericton Picaroons Reds	2	0	0	2	1	12	−11	0	Advance to third classification group	—	—	—

Source: http://www.canadasoccer.com/schedule-results-s15521
Rules for classification: 1) points; 2) head-to-head record; 3) goal difference

=== Group C ===
Pos	Team	Pld	W	D	L	GF	GA	GD	Pts	Qualification	AB	ON	BC
1	(Alberta) Edmonton Victoria SC	2	2	0	0	6	0	+6	6	Advance to first classification group	—	—	4–0
2	(Ontario) Scarborough GS United	2	0	1	1	3	5	−2	1	Advance to second classification group	0–2	—	3–3
3	(British Columbia) North Shore GSC Renegades	2	0	1	1	3	7	−4	1	Advance to third classification group	—	—	—

Source: http://www.canadasoccer.com/schedule-results-s15521
Rules for classification: 1) points; 2) head-to-head record; 3) goal difference

== Classification stage ==
=== First classification group ===
Pos	Team	Pld	W	D	L	GF	GA	GD	Pts	AB	BC	NL
1st place, gold medalist(s)	(Alberta) Edmonton Victoria SC	2	1	1	0	5	2	+3	4	—	—	—
2nd place, silver medalist(s)	(British Columbia) Surrey United SC	2	1	1	0	3	2	+1	4	2–2	—	—
3rd place, bronze medalist(s)	(Newfoundland and Labrador) Holy Cross SC	2	0	0	2	0	4	−4	0	0–3	0–1	—

Source: http://www.canadasoccer.com/schedule-results-s15521
Rules for classification: 1) points; 2) head-to-head record; 3) goal difference; 4) goals scored; 5) coin toss or kicks from the penalty mark

=== Second classification group ===
Pos	Team	Pld	W	D	L	GF	GA	GD	Pts	ON	QC	NS
4	(Ontario) Scarborough GS United	2	2	0	0	5	1	+4	6	—	—	—
5	(Quebec) CS Mont-Royal Outremont	2	1	0	1	2	3	−1	3	0–2	—	2–1
6	(Nova Scotia) Halifax Dunbrack SC	2	0	0	2	2	5	−3	0	1–3	—	—

Source: http://www.canadasoccer.com/schedule-results-s15521
Rules for classification: 1) points; 2) head-to-head record; 3) goal difference; 4) goals scored; 5) coin toss or kicks from the penalty mark

=== Third classification group ===
Pos	Team	Pld	W	D	L	GF	GA	GD	Pts	SK	BC	NB
7	(Saskatchewan) Saskatoon SK Impact FC	2	2	0	0	2	0	+2	6	—	1–0	1–0
8	(British Columbia) North Shore GSC Renegades	2	1	0	1	4	1	+3	3	—	—	—
9	(New Brunswick) Fredericton Picaroons Reds	2	0	0	2	0	5	−5	0	—	0–4	—

Source: http://www.canadasoccer.com/schedule-results-s15521
Rules for classification: 1) points; 2) head-to-head record; 3) goal difference; 4) goals scored; 5) coin toss or kicks from the penalty mark

== Tournament Ranking ==
Rank	Team
1st place, gold medalist(s)	(Alberta) Edmonton Victoria SC
2nd place, silver medalist(s)	(British Columbia) Surrey United SC
3rd place, bronze medalist(s)	(Newfoundland and Labrador) Holy Cross SC
4	(Ontario) Scarborough GS United
5	(Quebec) CS Mont-Royal Outremont
6	(Nova Scotia) Halifax Dunbrack
7	(Saskatchewan) Saskatoon SK Impact FC
8	(British Columbia) North Shore GSC Renegades
9	(New Brunswick) Fredericton Picaroons Reds

== Top Goalscorers ==
Rank	Player	Club	Goals
1	Heather Lund	Edmonton Victoria SC	4
2	Kristyn Shapka	Edmonton Victoria SC	3
2	Rheanne Sleiman	North Shore GSC Renegades	3
2	Jessie Noseworthy	Holy Cross SC	3
2	Kaitlyn Fournier	CS Mont-Royal Outremont	3
2	Nicole Stewart	Surrey United SC	3
2	Beatrice Currie	Halifax Dunbrack SC	3
8	(Eight players tied)		2
