= Nazim Belguendouz =

Canadian soccer and futsal player (born 1991)

Personal information
- Full name: Sitayeb Mohamed Nazim Belguendouz
- Date of birth: April 29, 1991 (age 35)
- Place of birth: Athens, Greece
- Height: 1.76 m (5 ft 9 in)
- Position: Midfielder

Youth career
- Lakers du Lac Saint-Louis

College career
Years	Team	Apps	(Gls)
2010–?	Montreal Carabins		
2019	UQAM Citadins		

Senior career*
Years	Team	Apps	(Gls)
2012	FC Brossard	16	(5)
2013	CS Mont-Royal Outremont	18	(5)
2014	Montreal Impact U23	12	(6)
2015	FC Montreal	12	(0)
2016	CS Mont-Royal Outremont	9	(2)
2016–2018	AS Blainville	39	(8)
2019–2022	CS Mont-Royal Outremont	38	(10)
2025–	CS Montreal-Centre	2	(1)

International career^{‡}
2016–2021	Canada (futsal)	12	(7)
2017	Canada (beach)	6	(3)
- * Club domestic league appearances and goals as of December 31, 2025 ‡ National team caps and goals as of October 16, 2020

Sitayeb Mohamed Nazim Belguendouz (born April 29, 1991) is a soccer player who plays as a midfielder for CS Mont-Royal Outremont. Born in Greece, he represents the Canada national futsal team.

== Early life ==
Belguendouz was born in Athens, Greece to Algerian parents and moved to Canada when he was 3. He began playing youth soccer with Lakers du Lac Saint-Louis.

== Career ==
=== University ===
In 2010, he began playing university soccer with the Montreal Carabins. In 2019, he returned to university soccer with the UQAM Citadins.

=== Club ===
In 2012, he played with FC Brossard in the Première ligue de soccer du Québec.

In 2013, he joined CS Mont-Royal Outremont, helping them win the league and cup double that season.

After the 2013 season, Mont-Royal Outremont got in contact with Major League Soccer club Montreal Impact and arranged for him to have a three-day trial with the Montreal Impact Academy. He had a successful trial and joined the Montreal Impact U23 team in the Premier Development League, serving as the team's co-captain. The following season, he joined the club's new professional second team, FC Montreal, in the USL serving as team captain. In March 2015, he made his debut as a starter in FC Montreal's inaugural match, a 2–0 loss to Toronto FC II.

In 2016, he returned to CS Mont-Royal Outremont.

Late in the 2016 season, he obtained his release from Mont-Royal Outremont and joined AS Blainville, staying with the club through 2018. In 2018, he scored against Dynamo de Québec to clinch the league title in a row for Blainville.

For the 2019 season, he once again returned to CS Mont-Royal Outremont. After the season, he re-signed with the club.

== International career ==
Belguendouz has been a member of the Canada national futsal team since 2016. In 2017, he was named the first ever Canadian Futsal player of the year by the Canadian Soccer Association.

In 2017, he was part of the Canada national beach soccer team.

== Career statistics ==
As of match played on October 2, 2021

Appearances and goals by club, season and competition
Club	Season	League			Domestic Cup		League Cup		Total	
Club	Season	Division	Apps	Goals	Apps	Goals	Apps	Goals	Apps	Goals
FC Brossard	2012	Première Ligue de soccer du Québec	16	5	—		—		16	5
CS Mont-Royal Outremont	2013	Première Ligue de soccer du Québec	18	5	—		3	0	21	5
Montreal Impact U23	2014	Premier Development League	12	6	—		—		12	6
FC Montreal	2015	United Soccer League	12	0	—		—		12	6
CS Mont-Royal Outremont	2016	Première Ligue de soccer du Québec	9	2	—		0	0	21	5
AS Blainville	2016	Première Ligue de soccer du Québec	1	0	—		1	0	2	0
AS Blainville	2017	Première Ligue de soccer du Québec	17	4	—		2	0	19	4
AS Blainville	2018	Première Ligue de soccer du Québec	21	4	2	0	1	0	22	4
AS Blainville	Total		39	8	2	0	4	0	46	8
CS Mont-Royal Outremont	2019	Première Ligue de soccer du Québec	14	6	—		1	0	15	6
CS Mont-Royal Outremont	2021	Première Ligue de soccer du Québec	13	1	—		—		13	1
CS Mont-Royal Outremont	2022	Première Ligue de soccer du Québec	11	3	1	0	—		12	3
CS Mont-Royal Outremont	Total		38	10	1	0	1	0	40	10
Career total			144	36	3	0	8	0	155	36
