= 2016 in Canadian soccer =

Soccer in Canada
- Season: 2016

Men's soccer
- MLS Cup: Seattle Sounders FC (Note: Toronto FC was the best Canadian club, reaching the final of the MLS Cup Playoffs.)
- Supporters' Shield: FC Dallas (Note: Toronto FC was the best Canadian club, placing 5th in the Supporters' Shield standings.)
- League1 Ontario: Vaughan Azzurri
- PLSQ: CS Mont-Royal Outremont
- USL: New York Red Bulls II (Note: Whitecaps FC 2 was the best Canadian club, reaching the Conference Finals of the USL Playoffs.)
- PDL: Michigan Bucks (Note: Calgary Foothills FC was the best Canadian club, reaching the final of the PDL national playoffs.)
- Canadian Championship: Toronto FC
- Challenge Trophy: Edmonton Scottish
- Inter-Provincial Cup: CS Mont-Royal Outremont

Women's soccer
- WPSL: Boston Breakers (Note: North Shore Girls SC were the best Canadian club, placing 5th in the Northwest division.)
- League1 Ontario: FC London
- Jubilee Trophy: Royal Sélect de Beauport

The 2016 in Canadian soccer was the 140th edition of competitive soccer in Canada.

== National teams ==
When available, the left column indicates the home team or the home team designate; the right column, away team or away team designate.

Win Draw Loss

=== Senior Men ===
==== 2018 FIFA World Cup Qualifiers ====
March 25, 2016 Round 4	Canada	0–3	Mexico	Vancouver, Canada
7:00 pm PT		Report	Hernández 32'; Lozano 40'; Corona 72'	Stadium: BC Place; Attendance: 54,798; Referee: Kimball Ward (Saint Kitts and Nevis)

March 29, 2016 Round 4	Mexico	2–0	Canada	Mexico City, Mexico
8:30 pm CT	Guardado 17' (pen.); Corona 45+3'	Report		Stadium: Estadio Azteca; Referee: Yadel Martínez (Cuba)

September 2, 2016 Round 4	Honduras	2–1	Canada	San Pedro Sula, Honduras
3:06 CT	Martínez 45+2'; Quioto 50'	Report	James 35'	Stadium: Estadio Olímpico Metropolitano; Referee: Yadel Martínez (Cuba)

September 6, 2016 Round 4	Canada	3–1	El Salvador	Vancouver, Canada
7:00 pm PT	Larin 11'; Ledgerwood 53'; Edgar 90+2'	Report	Bonilla 78'	Stadium: BC Place; Referee: Valdin Legister (Jamaica)

Canada finishes in third place; does not advance to fifth round of qualifying.

==== Friendlies ====
February 5, 2016 Friendly	United States	1–0	Canada	Carson, United States
7:45 pm PT	Altidore 90'			Stadium: StubHub Center; Attendance: 9,274; Referee: Marlon Mejía (El Salvador)

June 3, 2016 Friendly	Canada	1–1	Azerbaijan	Rohrbach an der Lafnitz, Austria
7:00 pm CET	Akindele 43'	Report	Navarov 57' (pen.)	Stadium: Stadion Rohrbach an der Lafnitz; Attendance: 150

June 7, 2016 Friendly	Canada	2–1	Uzbekistan	Bad Waltersdorf, Austria
4:00 pm CET	Edgar 20'; Kolimov 81' (o.g.)	Report	Shomurodov 62'	Stadium: Thermenstadion Bad Waltersdorf

October 6, 2016 Friendly	Mauritania	0–4	Canada	Marrakesh, Morocco
8:00 pm WET		Report	Ricketts 53', 80'; Vitoria 55'; Haber 59'	Stadium: Grand Stade de Marrakech; Attendance: 200

October 11, 2016 Friendly	Morocco	4–0	Canada	Marrakesh, Morocco
8:00 pm WET	Carcela 12'; Ziyech 65' (pen.), 81' (pen.); Alioui 86'	Report		Stadium: Grand Stade de Marrakech; Attendance: 8,000

November 11, 2016 Friendly	South Korea	2–0	Canada	Cheonan, South Korea
8:00 pm KST	Kim 10'; Lee 25'	Report		Stadium: Cheonan Baekseok Stadium; Attendance: 18,920

=== Senior Women ===
==== 2016 Olympic Games ====
August 3, 2016 Group stage	Canada	2–0	Australia	São Paulo, Brazil
3:00 pm BRT	Beckie 1'; Sinclair 80'	Report		Stadium: Arena Corinthians; Attendance: 20,521; Referee: Stéphanie Frappart (France)

August 6, 2016 Group stage	Canada	3–1	Zimbabwe	São Paulo, Brazil
3:00 pm BRT	Beckie 7', 35'; Sinclair 19' (pen.)	Report	Chirandu 86'	Stadium: Arena Corinthians; Referee: Olga Miranda (Paraguay)

August 9, 2016 Group stage	Germany	1–2	Canada	Brasília, Brazil
4:00 pm BRT	Behringer 13' (pen.)	Report	Tancredi 26', 60'	Stadium: Estádio Nacional Mané Garrincha; Referee: Ri Hyang-ok (North Korea)

August 12, 2016 Quarterfinal	Canada	1–0	France	São Paulo, Brazil
7:00 pm BRT	Schmidt 56'	Report		Stadium: Arena Corinthians; Attendance: 38,688; Referee: Claudia Umpierrez (Uruguay)

August 16, 2016 Semifinal	Canada	0–2	Germany	Belo Horizonte, Brazil
4:00 pm BRT		https://web.archive.org/web/20160827005630/https://www.rio2016.com/en/football-womens-semifinal-fb-3 Report	Behringer 21' (pen.); Däbritz 59'	Stadium: Mineirão; Referee: Ri Hyang-ok (North Korea)

August 19, 2016 Bronze medal match	Brazil	1–2	Canada	São Paulo, Brazil
1:00 pm BRT	Beatriz 79'	Report	Rose 25'; Sinclair 52'	Stadium: Arena Corinthians; Referee: Teodora Albon (Romania)

Canada finishes in third place.

==== 2016 Olympic Games Qualifiers ====
February 11, 2016 Group stage	Canada	5–0	Guyana	Houston, United States
7:30 pm CT	Rose 26', 39'; Lawrence 28', 46', 48'	Report		Stadium: BBVA Compass Stadium; Attendance: 836; Referee: Marianela Araya (Costa Rica)

February 14, 2016 Group stage	Trinidad and Tobago	0–6	Canada	Houston, United States
3:00 pm CT		Report	Matheson 24'; Tancredi 44'; Sinclair 63'; Buchanan 66'; Beckie 75'; Fleming 79'	Stadium: BBVA Compass Stadium; Attendance: 1,453; Referee: Quetzalli Alvarado (Mexico)

February 16, 2016 Group stage	Canada	10–0	Guatemala	Houston, United States
7:30 pm CT	Tancredi 4', 86'; Carle 27'; Beckie 35'; Prince 43', 84', 88'; Quinn 45+1' (pen.), 49', 52'	Report		Stadium: BBVA Compass Stadium; Attendance: 859

February 19, 2016 Semifinal	Canada	3–1	Costa Rica	Houston, United States
4:30 pm CT	Sinclair 17', 51'; Rose 86'	Report	Rodríguez 71' (pen.)	Stadium: BBVA Compass Stadium; Attendance: 5,516

February 21, 2016 Final	Canada	0–2	United States	Houston, United States
4:00 pm CT		Report	Horan 53'; Heath 61'	Stadium: BBVA Compass Stadium; Attendance: 10,119; Referee: Quetzalli Alvarado (Mexico)

Canada finishes in second place; qualifies for the 2016 Summer Olympics.

==== 2016 Algarve Cup ====
March 2, 2016 Group stage	Canada	0–1	Denmark	Albufeira, Portugal
3:00 pm WET		Report	Nadim 55'	Stadium: Estadio Municipal de Albufeira; Attendance: 500

March 4, 2016 Group stage	Canada	1–0	Belgium	Santo António, Portugal
3:00 pm WET	Clarke 89'	Report		Stadium: Complexo Desportivo

March 7, 2016 Group stage	Canada	1–0	Iceland	Lagos, Portugal
6:30 pm WET	Beckie 42'			Stadium: Estadio Municipal de Lagos

March 9, 2016 Final	Canada	2–1	Brazil	Parchal, Portugal
6:30 pm WET	Zadorsky 60'; Beckie 67'	Report	Andressa Alves 90'	Stadium: Estádio Municipal da Bela Vista; Referee: Sara Persson (Sweden)

Canada finishes in first place.

==== Friendlies ====
April 10, 2016 Friendly	Netherlands	1–2	Canada	Eindhoven, Netherlands
4:00 pm CET	van der Gragt 58'	Report	Sinclair 34'; Beckie 57'	Stadium: Jan Louwers Stadion

June 4, 2016 Friendly	Canada	0–2	Brazil	Toronto, Canada
4:00 pm ET			Marta (footballer) 11', 41'	Stadium: BMO Field; Attendance: 28,604

June 7, 2016 Friendly	Canada	1–0	Brazil	Ottawa, Canada
7:00 pm ET	Beckie 90+4'	Report		Stadium: TD Place; Attendance: 23,568

July 20, 2016 Friendly	Canada	1–0	China	Paris, France
7:00 pm CET	Fleming 6'	Report		Stadium: Stade Sébastien Charléty; Attendance: 95

July 23, 2016 Friendly	France	1–0	Canada	Auxerre, France
9:00 pm CET	Abily 36'	Report		Stadium: Stade de l'Abbé-Deschamps; Attendance: 17,589

== Domestic leagues ==
=== Men ===
==== Major League Soccer ====
Three Canadian teams (Montreal Impact, Toronto FC, and Vancouver Whitecaps FC) play in this league, which also contains 17 teams from the United States. It is considered a Division 1 league in the Canadian soccer league system.

Overall standings

Pos	Team	Pld	W	L	T	GF	GA	GD	Pts	Qualification
1	FC Dallas (S, U)	34	17	8	9	50	40	+10	60	Qualification for the CONCACAF Champions League
2	Colorado Rapids	34	15	6	13	39	32	+7	58	Qualification for the CONCACAF Champions League
3	New York Red Bulls	34	16	9	9	61	44	+17	57	Qualification for the CONCACAF Champions League
4	New York City FC	34	15	10	9	62	57	+5	54	
5	Toronto FC (V)	34	14	9	11	51	39	+12	53	Qualification for the CONCACAF Champions League
6	LA Galaxy	34	12	6	16	54	39	+15	52	
7	Seattle Sounders FC (C)	34	14	14	6	44	43	+1	48	Qualification for the CONCACAF Champions League
8	Sporting Kansas City	34	13	13	8	42	41	+1	47	
9	Real Salt Lake	34	12	12	10	44	46	−2	46	
10	D.C. United	34	11	10	13	53	47	+6	46	
11	Montreal Impact	34	11	11	12	49	53	−4	45	
12	Portland Timbers	34	12	14	8	48	53	−5	44	
13	Philadelphia Union	34	11	14	9	52	55	−3	42	
14	New England Revolution	34	11	14	9	44	54	−10	42	
15	Orlando City SC	34	9	11	14	55	60	−5	41	
16	Vancouver Whitecaps FC	34	10	15	9	45	52	−7	39	
17	San Jose Earthquakes	34	8	12	14	32	40	−8	38	
18	Columbus Crew SC	34	8	14	12	50	58	−8	36	
19	Houston Dynamo	34	7	14	13	39	45	−6	34	
20	Chicago Fire	34	7	17	10	42	58	−16	31	

Source: MLS
Rules for classification: 1) points; 2) total wins; 3) total goal differential; 4) total goals scored;
(C) MLS Cup champions; (S) Supporters' Shield winners; (U) U.S. Open Cup winners; (V) Canadian Championship winners

==== North American Soccer League ====
Two Canadian teams (FC Edmonton and Ottawa Fury FC) play in this league, which also contains 12 teams from the United States. It is considered a Division 2 league in the Canadian soccer league system.

Overall standings

Pos	Team	Pld	W	D	L	GF	GA	GD	Pts	Qualification
1	New York Cosmos (C, X)	32	20	5	7	59	29	+30	65	Championship qualifiers
2	Indy Eleven	32	15	10	7	51	33	+18	55	Championship qualifiers
3	FC Edmonton	32	15	8	9	25	21	+4	53	Championship qualifiers
4	Rayo OKC	32	12	11	9	39	33	+6	47	Championship qualifiers
5	Minnesota United	32	11	8	13	41	37	+4	41	
6	Fort Lauderdale Strikers	32	11	8	13	31	40	−9	41	
7	Miami FC	32	10	10	12	38	42	−4	40	
8	Carolina RailHawks	32	11	7	14	36	48	−12	40	
9	Tampa Bay Rowdies	32	9	12	11	40	41	−1	39	
10	Ottawa Fury	32	7	10	15	32	40	−8	31	
11	Jacksonville Armada	32	6	12	14	30	46	−16	30	
12	Puerto Rico FC	22	5	9	8	19	31	−12	24	

Source: NASL
Rules for classification: 1) points; 2) total goal differential; 3) total goals scored; 4) head-to-head record; 5) away goal differential; 6) away goals scored
(C) Champions; (X) Regular season champion

==== United Soccer League ====
Three Canadian teams (FC Montreal, Toronto FC II, and Whitecaps FC 2) play in this league, which also contains 25 teams from the United States. It is considered a Division 3 league in the Canadian soccer league system.

Eastern Conference

Pos	Team	Pld	W	D	L	GF	GA	GD	Pts	Qualification
1	New York Red Bulls II (C, X)	30	21	6	3	61	21	+40	69	Conference Playoffs
2	Louisville City FC	30	17	9	4	52	27	+25	60	Conference Playoffs
3	FC Cincinnati	30	16	8	6	41	27	+14	56	Conference Playoffs
4	Rochester Rhinos	30	13	12	5	38	25	+13	51	Conference Playoffs
5	Charlotte Independence	30	14	8	8	48	29	+19	50	Conference Playoffs
6	Charleston Battery	30	13	9	8	38	33	+5	48	Conference Playoffs
7	Richmond Kickers	30	12	9	9	33	26	+7	45	Conference Playoffs
8	Orlando City B	30	9	8	13	35	49	−14	35	Conference Playoffs
9	Wilmington Hammerheads FC	30	8	10	12	37	47	−10	34	
10	Harrisburg City Islanders	30	8	7	15	37	54	−17	31	
11	Bethlehem Steel FC	30	6	10	14	32	43	−11	28	
12	Toronto FC II	30	7	5	18	36	58	−22	26	
13	Pittsburgh Riverhounds	30	6	7	17	31	50	−19	25	
14	FC Montreal	30	7	2	21	35	57	−22	23	

Source: 2016 USL Standings
Rules for classification: 1) total wins; 2) total goal differential; 3) total goals scored; 4) points earned against top four Conference finishers; 5) disciplinary points; 6) coin toss or drawing of lots
(C) Champions; (X) Regular Season League Champion

Western Conference

Pos	Team	Pld	W	D	L	GF	GA	GD	Pts	Qualification
1	Sacramento Republic	30	14	10	6	43	27	+16	52	Conference Playoffs
2	Rio Grande Valley Toros	30	14	9	7	47	24	+23	51	Conference Playoffs
3	Colorado Springs Switchbacks	30	14	7	9	37	27	+10	49	Conference Playoffs
4	Swope Park Rangers	30	14	6	10	45	36	+9	48	Conference Playoffs
5	LA Galaxy II	30	12	11	7	52	42	+10	47	Conference Playoffs
6	Vancouver Whitecaps 2	30	12	9	9	44	44	0	45	Conference Playoffs
7	Oklahoma City Energy	30	10	13	7	32	30	+2	43	Conference Playoffs
8	Orange County Blues	30	12	4	14	39	41	−2	40	Conference Playoffs
9	Portland Timbers 2	30	12	4	14	38	42	−4	40	
10	San Antonio FC	30	10	8	12	36	36	0	38	
11	Real Monarchs	30	10	6	14	31	41	−10	36	
12	Seattle Sounders 2	30	9	8	13	35	50	−15	35	
13	Arizona United	30	9	7	14	40	46	−6	34	
14	Saint Louis FC	30	8	10	12	42	44	−2	34	
15	Tulsa Roughnecks	30	5	4	21	25	64	−39	19	

Source: 2016 USL Standings
Rules for classification: 1) total wins; 2) total goal differential; 3) total goals scored; 4) points earned against top four Conference finishers; 5) disciplinary points; 6) coin toss or drawing of lots

==== League1 Ontario ====
16 teams play in this league, all of which are based in Canada. It is considered a Division 3 league in the Canadian soccer league system.

Eastern Conference

Pos	Team	Pld	W	D	L	GF	GA	GD	Pts	Qualification
1	Vaughan Azzurri (C, X)	22	17	4	1	70	24	+46	55	League Championship
2	Woodbridge Strikers	22	15	2	5	52	17	+35	47	
3	North Toronto Nitros	22	14	3	5	52	29	+23	45	
4	Durham United FA	22	11	3	8	54	42	+12	36	
5	Kingston Clippers	22	7	5	10	34	53	−19	26	
6	Aurora United FC	22	4	3	15	27	66	−39	15	
7	Toronto Skillz FC	22	3	4	15	32	63	−31	13	
8	Master's Futbol	22	3	2	17	38	92	−54	11	

Source: http://www.league1ontario.com/page/show/2309115-standings
(C) Champions; (X) L1 Cup winner

Western Conference

Pos	Team	Pld	W	D	L	GF	GA	GD	Pts	Qualification
1	FC London	22	15	2	5	64	32	+32	47	League Championship
2	Sigma FC	22	14	2	6	48	28	+20	44	
3	Toronto FC Academy	22	12	2	8	70	37	+33	38	
4	North Mississauga SC	22	11	5	6	63	42	+21	38	
5	Windsor Stars	21	9	1	11	44	42	+2	28	
6	Oakville Blue Devils	22	8	4	10	38	43	−5	28	
7	Sanjaxx Lions	21	5	1	15	23	56	−33	16	
8	ProStars FC	22	4	3	15	24	67	−43	15	

Source: http://www.league1ontario.com/page/show/2309115-standings

League Championship

The league champion is determined by a single-match series between the top-ranked teams from the western and eastern conferences.

October 15, 2016	FC London	2–4	Vaughan Azzurri	Vaughan, Ontario
4:00 pm	Nafar 71'; Gigolaj 80'	Report	Butters 9'; Gogarty 12'; Kovacevic 52'; Whiteman 68'	Stadium: Ontario Soccer Centre; Attendance: 700

==== Première Ligue de soccer du Québec ====
Seven teams play in this league, all of which are based in Canada. It is considered a Division 3 league in the Canadian soccer league system.

Pos	Team	Pld	W	D	L	GF	GA	GD	Pts	Qualification
1	CS Mont-Royal Outremont	18	14	2	2	52	18	+34	44	Inter-Provincial Cup vs L1O Champion
2	AS Blainville	18	11	4	3	45	18	+27	37	
3	Lakeshore SC	18	7	6	5	25	21	+4	27	
4	FC Gatineau	18	6	4	8	18	30	−12	22	
5	CS Longueuil	18	4	5	9	27	41	−14	17	
6	FC Lanaudière	18	4	3	11	22	43	−21	15	
7	Ottawa Fury FC Academy	18	4	2	12	20	38	−18	14	

Source: TSI Sports

Pos	Team	Pld	W	D	L	GF	GA	GD	Pts
1	AS Blainville Reserves	12	9	2	1	32	12	+20	29
2	CS Mont-Royal Outremont Reserves	12	7	2	3	29	18	+11	23
3	FC Gatineau Reserves	12	7	1	4	19	17	+2	22
4	Lakeshore FC Reserves	12	4	5	3	26	21	+5	17
5	CS Longueuil Reserves	12	4	2	6	25	26	−1	14
6	Ottawa Fury FC Academy Reserves	12	2	2	8	17	30	−13	8
7	FC Lanaudière Reserves	12	2	0	10	14	38	−24	6

Source: http://www.tsisports.ca/soccer/archiveLigue/l_classam.aspx

==== Premier Development League ====
Six Canadian teams (TFC Academy, K-W United FC, Thunder Bay Chill, WSA Winnipeg, Calgary Foothills FC, and Victoria Highlanders) play in this league, which also contains 57 teams from the United States. It is considered a Division 4 league in the Canadian soccer league system.

Great Lakes Division

Pos	Team	Pld	W	L	T	GF	GA	GD	Pts	Qualification
1	Michigan Bucks (R)	14	12	2	0	45	7	+38	36	Advance to Central Conference Championship
2	K-W United FC	14	11	2	1	37	18	+19	34	Advance to Central Conference Championship
3	Derby City Rovers	14	7	5	2	31	25	+6	23	
4	Dayton Dutch Lions	14	4	5	5	23	30	−7	17	
5	Pittsburgh Riverhounds U23	14	2	8	4	14	30	−16	10	
6	TFC Academy	14	2	8	4	14	36	−22	10	
7	Cincinnati Dutch Lions	14	1	10	3	11	31	−20	6	

Source: Premier Development League
Rules for classification: Tiebreakers
(R) Regular Season Champions

Heartland Division

Pos	Team	Pld	W	L	T	GF	GA	GD	Pts	Qualification
1	Des Moines Menace	14	10	2	2	37	7	+30	32	Advance to Central Conference Championship
2	Thunder Bay Chill	14	7	2	5	33	19	+14	26	Advance to Central Conference Championship
3	Chicago Fire U-23	14	8	4	2	28	18	+10	26	
4	Kokomo Mantis FC	14	4	6	4	23	25	−2	16	
5	St. Louis Lions	14	2	8	4	19	28	−9	10	
6	WSA Winnipeg	14	1	11	2	7	51	−44	5	

Source: Premier Development League
Rules for classification: Tiebreakers

Northwest Division

Pos	Team	Pld	W	L	T	GF	GA	GD	Pts	Qualification
1	Calgary Foothills FC	14	8	3	3	22	12	+10	27	Advance to Western Conference Divisional Qualifiers
2	Seattle Sounders FC U-23	14	8	6	0	21	16	+5	24	Advance to Western Conference Divisional Qualifiers
3	Washington Crossfire	14	5	4	5	16	14	+2	20	
4	Kitsap Pumas (Note: Kitsap Pumas had three points deducted for using an illegal player against Victoria Highlanders.)	14	5	4	5	12	15	−3	17	
5	Victoria Highlanders	14	3	5	6	17	19	−2	15	
6	Lane United FC	14	3	5	6	13	16	−3	15	
7	Portland Timbers U23s	14	2	7	5	14	23	−9	11	

Source: Premier Development League
Rules for classification: Tiebreakers

==== Canadian Soccer League ====
Fourteen teams play in this league, all of which are based in Canada. It is a Non-FIFA league previously sanctioned by the Canadian Soccer Association and is now a member of the Soccer Federation of Canada (SFC).

First Division

Pos	Team	Pld	W	D	L	GF	GA	GD	Pts	Qualification
1	York Region Shooters (A, C)	21	16	3	2	40	10	+30	51	Qualification for Playoffs
2	FC Ukraine United (A)	21	9	6	6	45	38	+7	33	Qualification for Playoffs
3	Scarborough SC (A)	21	9	4	8	36	31	+5	31	Qualification for Playoffs
4	Serbian White Eagles (A, O)	21	9	3	9	33	27	+6	30	Qualification for Playoffs
5	Toronto Atomic FC (A)	21	8	6	7	36	37	−1	30	Qualification for Playoffs
6	Hamilton City (A)	21	6	5	10	31	38	−7	23	Qualification for Playoffs
7	Brantford Galaxy (A)	21	3	9	9	23	38	−15	18	Qualification for Playoffs
8	Milton SC (A)	21	4	4	13	25	50	−25	16	Qualification for Playoffs

Updated to match(es) played on October 9, 2016. Source: []
Rules for classification: 1) points; 2) goal difference; 3) number of goals scored.
(A) Advance to a further round; (C) Champions; (O) Play-off winners

Second Division

Pos	Team	Pld	W	D	L	GF	GA	GD	Pts	Qualification
1	SC Waterloo Region (A, C)	14	9	2	3	56	25	+31	29	Qualification for Playoffs
2	Toronto Atomic FC B (A)	15	9	2	4	56	28	+28	29	Qualification for Playoffs
3	Brantford Galaxy B (A)	14	8	2	4	44	30	+14	26	Qualification for Playoffs
4	York Region Shooters B (A, O)	15	5	3	7	32	34	−2	18	Qualification for Playoffs
5	London City (A)	13	4	1	8	31	45	−14	13	Qualification for Playoffs
6	Serbian White Eagles B (A)	13	2	0	11	19	76	−57	6	Qualification for Playoffs

Updated to match(es) played on October 9, 2016. Source: canadiansoccerleague.ca
Rules for classification: 1) points; 2) goal difference; 3) number of goals scored.
(A) Advance to a further round; (C) Champions; (O) Play-off winners

=== Women ===
==== National Women's Soccer League ====
No Canadian teams play in this league, though eleven players from the Canada women's national soccer team play on its teams. It is considered a Division 1 league in the Canadian soccer league system.

Overall standings

Pos	Team	Pld	W	D	L	GF	GA	GD	Pts	Qualification
1	Portland Thorns FC	20	12	5	3	35	19	+16	41	NWSL Shield
2	Washington Spirit	20	12	3	5	30	21	+9	39	NWSL Playoffs
3	Chicago Red Stars	20	9	6	5	24	20	+4	33	NWSL Playoffs
4	Western New York Flash (C)	20	9	5	6	40	26	+14	32	NWSL Playoffs
5	Seattle Reign FC	20	8	6	6	29	21	+8	30	
6	FC Kansas City	20	7	5	8	18	20	−2	26	
7	Sky Blue FC	20	7	5	8	24	30	−6	26	
8	Houston Dash	20	6	4	10	29	29	0	22	
9	Orlando Pride	20	6	1	13	20	30	−10	19	
10	Boston Breakers	20	3	2	15	14	47	−33	11	

Source: NWSL
Rules for classification: Tiebreakers
(C) Champions

==== Women's Premier Soccer League ====
103 teams play in this league, one of which is based in Canada (NSGSC). It is considered a Division 2 league in the Canadian soccer league system.

Pos	Team	Pld	W	D	L	GF	GA	GD	Pts	Notes
1	Sounders Women	10	10	0	0	37	6	+31	30	Conference Champion
2	ISC Gunners FC	9	6	1	2	26	10	+16	19	
3	CU Diamonds	9	5	2	2	17	10	+7	17	
4	OSA Football Club	10	5	1	4	23	14	+9	16	
5	NSGSC	9	3	1	5	21	22	−1	10	
6	Eugene Timbers FC Azul	11	3	1	7	11	25	−14	10	
7	Portland Spartans	8	1	0	7	9	30	−21	3	
8	Westside Timbers	8	0	2	6	4	35	−31	2	

Source: http://wpsl.info/standings/

==== League1 Ontario ====
Nine teams play in this league, all of which are based in Canada. It is considered a Division 3 league in the Canadian soccer league system.

Pos	Team	Pld	W	D	L	GF	GA	GD	Pts	Notes
1	FC London	16	14	0	2	50	15	+35	42	League Champion
2	Woodbridge Strikers	16	11	3	2	65	13	+52	36	
3	Durham United FA	16	9	3	4	38	17	+21	30	
4	Vaughan Azzurri	16	8	5	3	41	14	+27	29	
5	North Mississauga SC	16	5	5	6	23	30	−7	20	
6	Aurora United FC	16	5	3	8	31	34	−3	18	
7	Kingston Clippers	16	5	2	9	33	53	−20	17	
8	Darby FC	16	2	3	11	15	74	−59	9	
9	Sanjaxx Lions	16	1	0	15	11	57	−46	3	

Source: http://www.league1ontario.com/page/show/2309115-standings

== Domestic cups ==
=== Men ===
==== Canadian Championship ====
The Canadian Championship is contested by men's teams at the division 1 & 2 level.

Preliminary round
4	Ottawa Fury FC	3	0	3
5	FC Edmonton	0	2	2

Semifinals
1	Vancouver Whitecaps FC	0	3	3
4	Ottawa Fury FC	2	0	2
2	Montreal Impact	2	0	2
3	Toronto FC	4	0	4

Final
1	Vancouver Whitecaps FC	0	2	2
3	Toronto FC (a)	1	1	2

==== Inter-Provincial Cup ====
The Inter-Provincial Cup is a two-legged home-and-away series at the division 3 level played between the season champions of League1 Ontario and the Première Ligue de soccer du Québec.

November 5, 2016	CS Mont-Royal Outremont (Quebec)	1–1	(Ontario) Vaughan Azzurri	Terrebonne, Quebec
6:30 pm	Rosa 24'	Report	Kovacevic 57' (pen.)	Stadium: Terrebonne Sports Complex; Referee: R. Schaap

November 12, 2016	Vaughan Azzurri (Ontario)	1–2	(Quebec) CS Mont-Royal Outremont	Pickering, Ontario
5:00 pm	Lowe 14'	Report	Ritch-Andy 41'; Oliveri 67' (pen.)	Stadium: Pickering Soccer Centre

CS Mont-Royal Outremont wins 3–2 on aggregate.

==== Challenge Trophy ====
The Challenge Trophy is a national cup contested by men's teams at the division 4 level and below.

October 10, 2016	Royal Sélect de Beauport (Quebec)	0–1	(Alberta) Edmonton Scottish	St. John's, Newfoundland and Labrador
12:00 pm		Report	Wheeler 93'	Stadium: King George V Stadium

=== Women ===
==== Jubilee Trophy ====
The Jubilee Trophy is a national cup contested by women's teams at the division 4 level and below.

October 10, 2016	Richmond FC (British Columbia)	0–2	(Quebec) Royal Sélect de Beauport	St. John's, Newfoundland and Labrador
8:30 am		Report	Chastenay-Joseph; Verret	Stadium: King George V Stadium

== Canadian clubs in international competition ==
=== 2016–17 CONCACAF Champions League ===
August 2, 2016 Group stage	Central (Trinidad and Tobago)	0–1	(Canada) Vancouver Whitecaps FC	Couva, Trinidad and Tobago
9:00 pm AT		Report	Techera 34'	Stadium: Ato Boldon Stadium; Referee: Sherwin Moore (Guyana)

August 23, 2016 Group stage	Vancouver Whitecaps FC (Canada)	3–0	(United States) Sporting Kansas City	Vancouver, Canada
7:00 pm PT	Techera 8', 64'; Hurtado 12'	Report		Stadium: BC Place; Referee: Erick Miranda (Mexico)

September 13, 2016 Group stage	Sporting Kansas City (United States)	1–2	(Canada) Vancouver Whitecaps FC	Kansas City, United States
7:00 pm CT	Rubio 55'	Report	Hurtado 41'; Davies 90+3'	Stadium: Children's Mercy Park; Attendance: 13,422; Referee: Ricardo Montero (Costa Rica)

September 28, 2016 Group stage	Vancouver Whitecaps FC (Canada)	4–1	(Trinidad and Tobago) Central	Vancouver, Canada
7:00 pm PT	Pérez 11'; Techera 22' (pen.), 70'; Kudo 49'	Report	De Silva 44'	Stadium: BC Place; Referee: Luis Enrique Santander (Mexico)

(Canada) Vancouver Whitecaps FC advances to knockout stage.
