= 2015 Jubilee Trophy =

National Championships

Tournament details
- Country: Canada
- Date: October 8–12, 2015
- Teams: 8

Final positions
- Champions: Edmonton Victoria
- Runners-up: Royal-Sélect de Beauport

Tournament statistics
- Matches played: 16
- Goals scored: 47 (2.94 per match)

The 2015 Jubilee Trophy is the national championship for women's soccer clubs competing at division 4 and below in the Canadian soccer pyramid. It was held in Calgary, Alberta from October 8–12, 2015.

== Teams ==
Eight teams were granted entry into the competition; one from each Canadian province excluding New Brunswick and Prince Edward Island.

Teams were selected by their provincial soccer associations; most often qualifying by winning provincial leagues or cup championships such as the Ontario Cup.

Province	Team	Qualification
British Columbia	North Shore Girls SC Renegades	BC Soccer Women's Provincial Championships
Alberta	Edmonton Victoria	Alberta Soccer Provincial Championships
Saskatchewan	Hollandia Impact Saskatoon	Saskatchewan Open Cup
Manitoba	Winnipeg Bisons FC	Manitoba Provincial Championships
Ontario	Scarborough GS United	Ontario Cup
Quebec	Royal-Sélect de Beauport	Coupe du Quebec
Nova Scotia	Halifax Dunbrack Soccer Club	Nova Scotia Soccer League
Newfoundland and Labrador	Kirby United	Newfoundland and Labrador Jubilee Trophy

== Group stage ==
The eight teams in the competition were divided into two groups of four teams each, which then play a single-game round-robin format. At the end of group play, each team faces the equal-ranked team from the other group to determine a final seeding for the tournament.

=== Group A ===
Pos	Team	Pld	W	D	L	GF	GA	GD	Pts	Qualification	Alberta	Saskatchewan	Newfoundland and Labrador	Nova Scotia
1	(Alberta) Edmonton Victoria	3	3	0	0	7	2	+5	9	Advance to first place match	—	3–0	2–1	2–1
2	(Saskatchewan) Hollandia Impact (Note: Hollandia Impact finish in second place due to their superior goal differential (+1) against Kirby United (+0) and Halifax Dunbrack SC (-1))	3	1	0	2	2	4	−2	3	Advance to third place match		—		
3	(Newfoundland and Labrador) Kirby United	3	1	0	2	3	4	−1	3	Advance to fifth place match		0–2	—	2–0
4	(Nova Scotia) Halifax Dunbrack SC	3	1	0	2	2	4	−2	3	Advance to seventh place match		1–0		—

Source: http://www.canadasoccer.com/schedule-results-s15521

=== Group B ===
Pos	Team	Pld	W	D	L	GF	GA	GD	Pts	Qualification	Quebec	Ontario	British Columbia	Manitoba
1	(Quebec) Royal-Sélect de Beauport	3	3	0	0	5	1	+4	9	Advance to first place match	—	2–1		1–0
2	(Ontario) Scarborough GS United	3	2	0	1	9	2	+7	6	Advance to third place match		—		5–0
3	(British Columbia) North Shore Girls SC	3	1	0	2	5	6	−1	3	Advance to fifth place match	0–2	0–3	—	5–1
4	(Manitoba) Winnipeg Bisons FC	3	0	0	3	1	11	−10	0	Advance to seventh place match				—

Source: http://www.canadasoccer.com/schedule-results-s15521

== Final round ==
The final round consists of one game for each club, where they are paired with their equal-ranked opponent from the opposite group to determine a final ranking for the tournament.

Finals
1A	Edmonton Victoria	2
1B	Royal-Sélect de Beauport	1

October 12, 2015 (gold) 1st place match	Edmonton Victoria (Alberta)	2–1	(Quebec) Royal-Sélect de Beauport	Calgary, Alberta
10:30 am	Miller; Lund	Report	Bourgoing	Stadium: Calgary Soccer Centre AT2

October 12, 2015 (bronze) 3rd place match	Hollandia Impact (Saskatchewan)	1–3	(Ontario) Scarborough GS United	Calgary, Alberta
12:00 pm		Report		Stadium: Calgary Soccer Centre AT3

October 12, 2015 5th place match	Kirby United (Newfoundland and Labrador)	2–4	(British Columbia) North Shore Girls SC	Calgary, Alberta
9:00 am	Harris	Report	James; Harker; Oates; Falls	Stadium: Shouldice Athletic Park - Stampeder Field

October 12, 2015 7th place match	Halifax Dunbrack SC (Nova Scotia)	0–0 (2–4 p)	(Manitoba) Winnipeg Bisons FC	Calgary, Alberta
9:00 am		Report		Stadium: Shouldice Athletic Park - Encana Field

== Tournament Ranking ==
Rank	Team
1st place, gold medalist(s)	(Alberta) Edmonton Victoria
2nd place, silver medalist(s)	(Quebec) Royal-Sélect de Beauport
3rd place, bronze medalist(s)	(Ontario) Scarborough GS United
4	(Saskatchewan) Hollandia Impact
5	(British Columbia) North Shore Girls SC
6	(Newfoundland and Labrador) Kirby United
7	(Manitoba) Winnipeg Bisons FC
8	(Nova Scotia) Halifax Dunbrack SC
