= Jubilee Trophy =

Canadian women's amateur soccer tournament

- Founded: 1982
- Region: Canada (CONCACAF)
- Teams: 8–10
- Current champions: (Newfoundland and Labrador) Holy Cross FC (3rd title)
- Most championships: (Alberta) Edmonton Angels (9 titles)
- Broadcaster: Canada Soccer
- Website: canadasoccer.com

The Jubilee Trophy (French: Trophée Jubilee) is the trophy presented to Canada's women's amateur soccer champions as part of Canada Soccer's annual National Championships. The women's competition was inaugurated in 1982.

As part of the same National Championships, the Challenge Trophy is presented annually to the men's amateur soccer champions. The first men's amateur competition took place in 1913. Other amateur divisions in the National Championships are: Boys U-17 Cup; Girls U-17 Cup; Boys U-15 Cup; Girls U-15 Cup.

Eight clubs have won the National Championships women's competition two or more times. Edmonton Angels are the most successful club with nine Jubilee Trophy titles to their credit (1982, 1983, 1984, 1985, 1986, 1988, 1995, 1999, 2000).

== Amateur eligibility ==
As Canada Soccer's premier amateur competition, only Canadian citizens, permanent residents or protected persons may compete in the National Championships. Only amateur players (including reinstated amateurs) may compete in the competition and they must be assigned to their respective clubs by 31 August of that year (or an earlier date if stipulated by the province or territory).

== Format and hosts ==
The tournament is divided into two stages; a group stage and a classification stage. In the group stage, the eight teams are divided into two groups of four teams, which then play a single-game round robin format.

At the end of the group stage, each team advances to the classification round and plays against the team from the other group with the corresponding ranking to determine overall standings for the tournament.

Canadian communities have the opportunity to bid on hosting the National Championships. As explained by Canada Soccer, "events will be organized and executed by Canada Soccer in collaboration with the Local Organizing Committee." Bidders are evaluated across nine different categories: Background; Support and partnerships; Facilities; Competition; Finance; Communication, hosting services & activities; Operation Organization; Legacy; and Overall Bid Presentation.

Once a Host City is selected, the hosts set up a Local Organizing Committee that stages the competition. Canada Soccer remains the "rights holder and has the overall responsibility for these events."

=== Hosts by province (1982 to 2025) ===
Host cities for the women's (Jubilee Trophy) and men's (Challenge Trophy) adult amateur competitions have mostly been the same (1985 to 1991; 1993 to present), with the exception of just a few years (1982, 1983, 1984, 1992).

| Rank | Province | Years Hosted | Host Cities |
|---|---|---|---|
| 1 | Newfoundland and Labrador | 6 | St. John's (1989, 2002, 2008, 2016, 2019, 2025) |
| 1 | Nova Scotia | 6 | Lunenburg (1983), Dartmouth (1990), New Minas (1996), Halifax (2007, 2013, 2023) |
| 2 | British Columbia | 5 | Victoria (1984), Chilliwack (1999), Surrey (2006, 2017, 2024) |
| 2 | Alberta | 5 | Calgary (1997, 2005, 2015), Edmonton (1985, 1994) |
| 2 | Saskatchewan | 5 | Saskatoon (1988, 1991, 2000, 2009, 2018) |
| 2 | Ontario | 5 | Etobicoke (1982, 1993), Vaughan (2001, 2014, 2022) |
| 2 | Quebec | 5 | Ste-Thérèse (1984), Sherbrooke (1986), Dorval (1992), Québec (2003), Brossard (2011) |
| 8 | Manitoba | 3 | Winnipeg (1987, 1995, 2012) |
| 9 | Prince Edward Island | 2 | Charlottetown (2004, 2010) |
| 10 | New Brunswick | 1 | Fredericton (1998) |

== History and evolution ==
Canada Soccer planned to launch their first women's National Championship in 1983, but they changed their plans and hosted their first Canadian Final in 1982. That first Final featured the winners of Canada Soccer's Western and Eastern Championships, the Edmonton George's Angels and London Concorde SC, at Centennial Stadium on Saturday 6 November 1982. Edmonton won 4-0 to capture the first Canadian title.

Before women's professional soccer was established in North America, Canada Soccer's National Championships Jubilee Trophy competition featured many of Canada's best players from the 1980s and 1990s. From Canada's first National Team at the 1986 North America Cup, 14 of the 16 players featured in at least one National Championships during their career. From Canada's first two FIFA World Cup teams in 1995 and 1999, 20 of the 33 players featured in at least one National Championships before they featured at a FIFA World Cup.

With the establishment of the USL W-League and then professional leagues WUSA, WPS and the NWSL, fewer and fewer of Canada's best players have featured at the amateur National Championships. From Canada's next two FIFA World Cup teams in 2003 and 2007, 11 of the 29 players featured in at least one National Championships before they featured at a FIFA World Cup (although six of those 11 players were teenagers at the National Championships).

From Canada's most recent FIFA World Cup team in 2023, only four of the 23 players featured in at least one National Championships, albeit all of them as teenagers before their professional careers (Deanne Rose, Sophie Schmidt, Christine Sinclair and Shelina Zadorsky).

== Qualifying competitions ==
As outlined in the tournament regulations, "Provincial and Territorial Associations must advise Canada Soccer of its qualified teams" for the National Championships. Teams that feature at the National Championships are most often the provincial amateur champions.

| Province | Qualification |
|---|---|
| British Columbia | BC Province Cup winners |
| Alberta | Alberta Cup winners |
| Saskatchewan | Sask Cup winners |
| Manitoba | MSA Cup winners |
| Ontario | Ontario Cup winners |
| Québec | Ligue 2 Québec Féminin champions |
| New Brunswick | Soccer New Brunswick Cup winners |
| Nova Scotia | Soccer Nova Scotia Cup winners |
| Prince Edward Island | PEI Cup winners (sometimes winners by acclamation) |
| Newfoundland and Labrador | Newfoundland and Labrador Cup winners |

== Medals and trophy ==
The top-three teams at the National Championships Challenge Trophy competition are presented medals while the remaining teams are presented participation banners. Along with their medals, the winning team is presented the Jubilee Trophy, although the trophy remains in Canada Soccer's possession.

== Winners ==
| Season | Winners | Score | Runners-up | Scorers | MVP | Venue |
|---|---|---|---|---|---|---|
| 1982 | Edmonton Angels | 4–0 | London Concorde | Maria Cuncannon (2), Anita Saiko (2) | | Etobicoke, Ontario; Centennial Stadium |
| 1983 | Edmonton Angels | 6-0 | Halifax Econo Colour | | | Lunenburg, Nova Scotia; Lunenburg Centre Junior High |
| 1984 | Edmonton Angels | 1-0 | James Bay SC | | | Sainte-Thérèse, Quebec; Parc Ducharme |
| 1985 | Edmonton Angels | 1–0 | Richmond Kornerkicks | | | Edmonton, Alberta; Clarke Field |
| 1986 | Edmonton Angels | 6-3 | Richmond Kornerkicks | | | Sherbrooke, Quebec, Quebec; Rock Forest Park |
| 1987 | Coquitlam United SC | 2-2 (a.e.t.); 3–2 (p) | Oakville SC | | | Winnipeg, Manitoba; University of Manitoba |
| 1988 | Edmonton Angels | 2-1 | Coquitlam United SC | | | Saskatoon, Saskatchewan; Umea West |
| 1989 | Dorval United SC | 1-0 | Oakville SC | | | St. John's, Newfoundland; King George V Park |
| 1990 | Coquitlam Strikers SC | 1–0 | Dartmouth City Mazda | | | Dartmouth, Nova Scotia; Beazley Field |
| 1991 | Surrey Marlins SC | 2-0 | Dartmouth City Mazda | | | Saskatoon, Saskatchewan |
| 1992 | Surrey Marlins SC | 3-0 | Dartmouth City Mazda | | | Dorval, Quebec; Dorval Community Centre |
| 1993 | Surrey Marlins SC | 2–0 | Lethbridge Chargers SC | | | Etobicoke, Ontario; Centennial Stadium |
| 1994 | Coquitlam SC Metro Ford Strikers | 1–0 | Lethbridge Chargers SC | | | Edmonton, Alberta; Victoria Soccer |
| 1995 | Edmonton Angels | 5-1 | Victoria Gorge FC | | | Winnipeg, Manitoba; Winnipeg Sports Complex |
| 1996 | Vancouver UBC Alumni | 2-1 | Halifax City Mazda | | | New Minas, Nova Scotia; Lockhart Ryan Memorial Park |
| 1997 | Nepean United | 1–0 | Vancouver UBC Alumni | | | Calgary, Alberta; Calgary Soccer Centre |
| 1998 | Nepean United | 2-0 | Vancouver UBC Alumni | | | Fredericton, New Brunswick; Chapman |
| 1999 | Edmonton Angels | 3-2 | Vancouver UBC Alumni | | | Chilliwack, British Columbia; Townsend Park |
| 2000 | Edmonton Angels | 3-1 | Vancouver UBC Alumni | | | Saskatoon, Saskatchewan; Umea East |
| 2001 | Burnaby Canadians | 0-0 (a.e.t.); 6-5 (p) | Sackville Scotia Olympics | | | Vaughan, Ontario; Vaughan Grove |
| 2002 | Oakville SC | 2–1 | Edmonton Victoria SC | | | St. John's, Newfoundland |
| 2003 | Halifax Athens United | 1-1 (a.e.t.); 4-1 (p) | FC Sélect Rive-Sud | | | Quebec City, Quebec; Patro |
| 2004 | Edmonton Victoria SC | 1-0 | Halifax Athens United | | | Charlottetown, Prince Edward Island; UPEI |
| 2005 | Edmonton Victoria SC | 3-0 | Eliot River | | | Calgary, Alberta; Broadview Park |
| 2006 | Surrey United SC | 2-0 | Coquitlam FC | | | Surrey, British Columbia; Newton Athletic Park |
| 2007 | Dynamo Québec | 3-0 | Surrey United SC | | | Halifax, Nova Scotia; Mainland Commons |
| 2008 | Halifax City | 3-2 | North London Galaxy | | | St. John's, Newfoundland; King George V Park |
| 2009 | Edmonton Victoria SC | 0-0; 5-4 (p) | Surrey United SC | | | Saskatoon, Saskatchewan; SaskTel Field House |
| 2010 | Halifax Dunbrack | 2-1 | Edmonton Victoria SC | | | Charlottetown, Prince Edward Island; UPEI |
| 2011 | Surrey United SC | 2-1 | Royal-Sélect de Beauport | | | Brossard, Quebec; Illinois |
| 2012 | North London Galaxy | 1-0 | Surrey United SC | | | Winnipeg, Manitoba; Winnipeg Sports Complex |
| 2013 | Edmonton Victoria SC | 1-0 | Royal-Sélect de Beauport | | | Halifax, Nova Scotia; Mainland Commons |
| 2014 | Edmonton Victoria SC | 1-0 | Surrey United SC | | | Vaughan, Ontario; Ontario Soccer Centre |
| 2015 | Edmonton Victoria SC | 2-1 | Royal-Sélect de Beauport | | | Calgary, Alberta; AT |
| 2016 | Royal-Sélect de Beauport | 2-0 | Richmond FC | | | St. John's, Newfoundland; King George V Park |
| 2017 | Edmonton Victoria SC | (first place) | Surrey United SC | (no final) | | Surrey, British Columbia; Newton Athletic Park |
| 2018 | Scarborough GS United | 1-0 | Surrey United SC | | | Saskatoon, Saskatchewan; Umea Field |
| 2019 | Royal-Sélect de Beauport | 1-0 (a.e.t.) | Edmonton Northwest United SC | Audrey Genois 112' | | St. John's, Newfoundland; King George V Park |
| 2022 | Holy Cross FC | 3-0 | London Alliance FC Galaxy | Lauren Taylor 3', Malorie Harris 20', Connie Lewis 55' | Jane Pope | Vaughan, Ontario; North Maple |
| 2023 | Holy Cross FC | 2-0 | CS Mont-Royal Outremont | Jessie Noseworthy 5', Emily Bailey 28' | Shannon Galway | Halifax, Nova Scotia; Mainland Commons |
| 2024 | CS Trident - Ouest de Québec | 1-1 (p) | Coquitlam Metro-Ford SC | | | Surrey, British Columbia |
| 2025 | Holy Cross FC | 2-1 | CS Trident - Ouest de Québec | Jessie Noseworthy 3', Terri Murphy 56' | Terri Murphy | St. John's, Newfoundland; King George V Park |

== Titles ==
=== Most titles by provincial association (1982 to 2025) ===
| Rank | Province | Titles | Years |
|---|---|---|---|
| 1 | Alberta | 16 | 1982, 1983, 1984, 1985, 1986, 1988, 1995, 1999, 2000, 2004, 2005, 2009, 2013, 2014, 2015, 2017 |
| 2 | British Columbia | 10 | 1987, 1990, 1991, 1992, 1993, 1994, 1996, 2001, 2006, 2011 |
| 3 | Ontario | 5 | 1997, 1998, 2002, 2012, 2018 |
| 3 | Quebec | 5 | 1989, 2007, 2016, 2019, 2024 |
| 5 | Newfoundland and Labrador | 3 | 2022, 2023, 2025 |
| 5 | Nova Scotia | 3 | 2003, 2008, 2010 |
| 7 | Saskatchewan | 0 | |
| 7 | Manitoba | 0 | |
| 7 | New Brunswick | 0 | |
| 7 | Prince Edward Island | 0 | |

=== Most titles by club (all-time winners & runners up, 1982 to 2025) ===
| Rank | Club | Champions | Winning years | Runners up | Years as Runners Up |
|---|---|---|---|---|---|
| 1 | Edmonton Angels | 9 | 1982, 1983, 1984, 1985, 1986, 1988, 1995, 1999, 2000 | | |
| 2 | Edmonton Victoria SC | 7 | 2004, 2005, 2009, 2013, 2014, 2015, 2017 | 2 | 2002, 2010 |
| 3 | Surrey Marlins SC | 3 | 1991, 1992, 1993 | | |
| 3 | St. John's Holy Cross FC | 3 | 2022, 2023, 2025 | | |
| 5 | Coquitlam SC Strikers / Coquitlam SC Strikers | 2 | 1987, 1990 | 1 | 1988 |
| 5 | Nepean United | 2 | 1997, 1998 | | |
| 5 | Surrey United SC | 2 | 2006, 2011 | 6 | 2007, 2009, 2012, 2014, 2017, 2018 |
| 5 | Royal-Sélect Beauport | 2 | 2016, 2019 | 3 | 2011, 2013, 2015 |
| 9 | Dorval United SC | 1 | 1989 | | |
| 9 | Coquitlam Metro-Ford SC Strikers | 1 | 1994 | | |
| 9 | Vancouver UBC Alumni | 1 | 1996 | 4 | 1997, 1998, 1999, 2000 |
| 9 | Burnaby Canadians | 1 | 2001 | | |
| 9 | Oakville SC | 1 | 2002 | 2 | 1987, 1989 |
| 9 | Halifax Athens United | 1 | 2003 | 1 | 2004 |
| 9 | Dynamo Québec | 1 | 2007 | | |
| 9 | Halifax City SC | 1 | 2008 | 1 | 1996 |
| 9 | Halifax Dunbrack SC | 1 | 2010 | | |
| 9 | North London Galaxy | 1 | 2012 | 1 | 2008 |
| 9 | Scarborough GS United | 1 | 2018 | | |
| 9 | CS Trident - Ouest de Québec | 1 | 2024 | 1 | 2025 |
| 21 | London Concorde SC | | | 1 | 1982 |
| 21 | Halifax Econo Colour | | | 1 | 1983 |
| 21 | James Bay | | | 1 | 1984 |
| 21 | Richmond Kornerkicks | | | 2 | 1985, 1986 |
| 21 | Dartmouth City Mazda | | | 3 | 1990, 1991, 1992 |
| 21 | Lethbridge Chargers SC | | | 2 | 1993, 1994 |
| 21 | Victoria Gorge FC | | | 1 | 1995 |
| 21 | Sackville Scotia Olympics | | | 1 | 2001 |
| 21 | FC Sélect Rive-Sud | | | 1 | 2003 |
| 21 | Eliot River | | | 1 | 2005 |
| 21 | Coquitlam FC | | | 1 | 2006 |
| 21 | Richmond FC | | | 1 | 2016 |
| 21 | Edmonton Northwest United SC | | | 1 | 2019 |
| 21 | London Alliance FC Galaxy | | | 1 | 2022 |
| 21 | CS Mont-Royal Outremont | | | 1 | 2023 |

=== Most titles by player (1982 to 2025) ===
| Rank | Player | Titles | Winning years |
|---|---|---|---|
| 1 | Tracy David | 6 | Edmonton Angels 1982, 1983, 1984, 1985, 1986, 1988 |
| 1 | Anita Saiko | 6 | Edmonton Angels 1982, 1983, 1984, 1985, 1986, 1988 |
| 1 | Sue Simon | 6 | Edmonton Angels 1982, 1983, 1984, 1985, 1986, 1995 |
| 4 | Sue Brand | 5 | Edmonton Angels 1983, 1984, 1985, 1986, 1988 |
| 4 | Lisa (Fong) McDonell | 5 | Edmonton Angels 1982, 1983, 1984, 1986, 1988 |
| 4 | Cathy (Rustemeier) Sawchuk | 5 | Edmonton Angels 1982, 1983, 1984, 1985, 1986 |
| 4 | Lyndsay Stewart | 5 | Edmonton Victoria SC 2004, 2005, 2009, 2013, 2014 |
| 4 | Keshia (Wallin) Weatherald | 5 | Edmonton Victoria SC 2005, 2009, 2013, 2014, 2015 |
