= 2013 Première ligue de soccer du Québec season =

Première ligue de soccer du Québec
- Season: 2013
- Champions: CS Mont-Royal Outremont
- Cup champions: CS Mont-Royal Outremont
- Matches: 63
- Goals: 194 (3.08 per match)
- Top goalscorer: Frederico Moojen (17) (FC L'Assomption)

The 2013 PLSQ season was the second season of existence for the Première ligue de soccer du Québec, a Division 3 men's semi-professional soccer league and the highest level of soccer fully contained within the province of Québec. It is below Major League Soccer and the North American Soccer League in the Canadian soccer league system.

FC Saint-Léonard were the defending champions from 2012.

CS Mont-Royal Outremont won the 2013 league championship as well as the inaugural League Cup.

== Teams ==
The 2013 season was contested between seven teams. CS Mont-Royal Outremont and FC Gatineau joined the league.

Team	City	Stadium
AS Blainville	Blainville, Laurentides	Stade du Parc Blainville
CS Mont-Royal Outremont	Mount Royal, Montréal	Parc Recreatif de TMR
FC Boisbriand	Boisbriand, Laurentides	Parc Régional 640
FC Brossard	Brossard, Montérégie	Parc Illinois
FC Gatineau	Gatineau, Outaouais	Terrain Mont-Bleu
FC L'Assomption	L'Assomption, Lanaudière	Stade André-Courcelles
Saint-Léonard FC	St Leonard, Montreal	Stade Hébert

== Season standings ==
Pos	Team	Pld	W	D	L	GF	GA	GD	Pts	
1	CS Mont-Royal Outremont	18	11	4	3	38	13	+25	37	League champion
2	FC Saint-Léonard	18	11	3	4	32	11	+21	36	
3	FC Brossard	18	10	1	7	32	31	+1	31	
4	FC Gatineau	18	8	2	8	28	25	+3	26	
5	FC L'Assomption	18	7	2	9	25	24	+1	23	
6	AS Blainville	18	5	5	8	24	28	−4	20	
7	FC Boisbriand	18	2	1	15	15	62	−47	5 (Note: FC Boisbriand was deducted 2 points for defaulting two matches.)	

Source: Publication Sports

=== Top scorers ===
Rank	Player	Club	Goals
1	Frederico Moojen	FC L'Assomption	17
2	Wassym Amara	CS Mont-Royal Outremont	12
3	Pierre-Rudolph Mayard	FC St-Léonard	9
4	Maxime Daigle	FC Gatineau	7
4	Mohamed Hany Saidi	FC Brossard	7
4	Simon Beaulieu	AS Blainville	7

=== Awards ===
Award	Player (club)	Ref
Ballon d'or (Best Player)	Gabard Fénélon (FC Saint-Léonard)	
Ballon d'argent (2nd Best Player)	Pierre-Rudolph Mayard (FC Saint-Léonard)	
Ballon de bronze (3rd Best Player)	Wassym Amara (CS Mont-Royal Outremont)	
Golden Boot (Top Scorer)	Frederico Moojen (FC L'Assomption)	
Coach of the Year	Luc Brutus (CS Mont-Royal Outremont)	

== Coupe PLSQ ==
The PLSQ debuted their League Cup this season, which took place following the end of the season. The top six teams from the league season were divided into two groups (the seventh place club - FC Boisbriand - did not qualify). Each team would play the other two teams in the group, with the first place finisher in each group advancing to the finals. CS Mont-Royal Outremont won the League Cup defeating FC Brossard 2-0 in the finals.

=== Group stage ===
Group A

Pos	Team	Pld	W	D	L	GF	GA	GD	Pts	Qualification
1	CS Mont-Royal Outremont	2	2	0	0	4	2	+2	6	Advance to Championship match
2	FC Gatineau	2	1	0	1	3	2	+1	3	
3	AS Blainville	2	0	0	2	3	6	−3	0	

Group B

Pos	Team	Pld	W	D	L	GF	GA	GD	Pts	Qualification
1	FC Brossard	2	1	1	0	6	2	+4	4	Advance to Championship match
2	FC L'Assomption	2	1	1	0	3	2	+1	4	
3	FC Saint-Léonard	2	0	0	2	0	5	−5	0	

=== Championship Match ===
November 2, 2013	CS Mont-Royal Outremont	2–0	FC Brossard	Terrebonne, Lanaudière
2:00 p.m.	M.Gacougnolle 18'; Dagrou 45'	Report		Stadium: Centre de Soccer Multifonctionnel de Terrebonne
