= 2012 Première ligue de soccer du Québec season =

Première ligue de soccer du Québec
- Season: 2012
- Champions: Saint-Léonard FC
- Matches: 40
- Goals: 142 (3.55 per match)
- Top goalscorer: Frederico Moojen (14) (FC L'Assomption)

The 2012 PLSQ season was the first season of existence for the Première ligue de soccer du Québec, a Division 3 men's semi-professional soccer league and the highest level of soccer fully contained within the province of Quebec. It is below Major League Soccer and the North American Soccer League in the Canadian soccer league system.

FC Saint-Léonard were the league champions for the inaugural season.

== Teams ==
The 2012 season was contested between five teams. Each team will play 16 regular season games, as well as four exhibition matches with each team playing a match against the Montreal Impact Academy, the U23 team of Quebec, Alymer, and one other semi-professional team.

| Team | City | Stadium |
|---|---|---|
| AS Blainville | Blainville, Laurentides | Stade du Parc Blainville |
| FC Boisbriand | Boisbriand, Laurentides | Parc Régional 640 |
| FC Brossard | Brossard, Montérégie | Parc Illinois |
| FC L'Assomption | L'Assomption, Lanaudière | Stade André-Courcelles |
| FC Saint-Léonard | St Leonard, Montreal | Stade Hébert |

== Standings ==
| Pos | Team | Pld | W | D | L | GF | GA | GD | Pts | |
|---|---|---|---|---|---|---|---|---|---|---|
| 1 | FC Saint-Léonard | 16 | 8 | 4 | 4 | 34 | 25 | +9 | 28 | League champion |
| 2 | FC L'Assomption | 16 | 7 | 4 | 5 | 34 | 26 | +8 | 25 | |
| 3 | AS Blainville | 16 | 6 | 2 | 8 | 26 | 35 | −9 | 20 | |
| 4 | FC Brossard | 16 | 5 | 4 | 7 | 26 | 28 | −2 | 19 | |
| 5 | FC Boisbriand | 16 | 4 | 6 | 6 | 22 | 28 | −6 | 18 | |

Source: Gol Network

=== Top scorers ===
| Rank | Player | Club | Goals |
|---|---|---|---|
| 1 | Frederico Moojen | FC L'Assomption | 16 |
| 2 | Luta Makita | FC Saint-Léonard | 10 |
| 3 | Simon Beaulieu | AS Blainville | 8 |
| 4 | Rocco Placentino | FC Saint-Léonard | 7 |
| 5 | Cedric Carrie | FC Brossard | 6 |
| 5 | Armel Dagrou | FC Brossard | 6 |
| 5 | Camilo Trujillo | FC Boisbriand | 6 |

== Awards ==
| Award | Player (club) | Ref |
|---|---|---|
| Ballon d'or (Best Player) | Cédric Carrié (FC Brossard) | |
| Ballon d'argent (2nd Best Player) | Rocco Placentino (FC Saint-Léonard) | |
| Ballon de bronze (3rd Best Player) | Frederico Moojen (FC L'Assomption) | |
| Golden Boot (Top Scorer) | Frederico Moojen (FC L'Assomption) | |
| Coach of the Year | Jean-Pierre Cériani (AS Blainville) | |
