= AS Brossard =

Semi-professional soccer club

- Full name: L’Association de Soccer de Brossard
- Founded: 1978
- League: Ligue2 Québec
- 2025: L2Q, 24th - relegated (men); L2Q, 3rd (women)
- Website: https://www.asbrossard.com/

AS Brossard is a Canadian semi-professional soccer club based in Brossard, Quebec that plays in the Ligue2 Québec.

== History ==
Former logo

The club was originally formed in 1978 as a youth soccer club.

In 2012, the semi-professional club was established to play in the newly formed Première Ligue de soccer du Québec, a Division III league, as one of the founding members, under the name FC Brossard. Their home field was located at Parc Illinois. Former Montreal Impact player Bill Sedgewick was named as the team's head coach. Cédric Carrié won the Ballon d’Or in the 2012 season as the league's top player. In 2013, they advanced to the finals of the League Cup, losing to CS Mont-Royal Outremont 2-0. The club did not return for the 2014 PLSQ season, due to the high financial costs associated with operating a team.

In 2021, they joined CF Montreal's Scouting and Development Centre.

In 2025 they rejoined the League1 Canada system as a founding club of the Ligue2 Québec.

== Seasons ==
Season	League	Teams	Record	Rank	League Cup	Ref
2012	Première Ligue de soccer du Québec	5	5–4–7	4th	–	
2013	Première Ligue de soccer du Québec	7	10–1–7	3rd	Finalists	
2014–2024	on hiatus					
2025	Ligue2 Québec	24	1–0–22	24th (relegated)	–	

Women

Season	League	Teams	Record	Rank	Playoffs	League Cup	Ref
2025	Ligue2 Québec	19	12–3–3	3rd	–	–	

== Notable former players ==
The following players have either played at the professional or international level, either before or after playing for the PLSQ team:

- (Canada) Nazim Belguendouz
- (Burundi) (Canada) Armel Dagrou
- (Mauritius) Kevin Chan-Yu-Tin
- (Algeria) (Canada) Chakib Hocine
- (Bulgaria) Karamfil Ilchev
