= 2016 Première ligue de soccer du Québec season =

Première ligue de soccer du Québec
- Season: 2016
- Champions: CS Mont-Royal Outremont
- Cup champions: AS Blainville
- Matches: 63
- Goals: 209 (3.32 per match)
- Top goalscorer: Frederico Moojen (21) (CS Mont-Royal Outremont) & Pierre-Rudolph Mayard (21) (AS Blainville)
- Best goalkeeper: Francis Monongo (0.75 GAA) (CS Mont-Royal Outremont)
- Biggest home win: Mont-Royal 5-0 Ottawa (May 15, 2016); Lanaudière 5-0 Ottawa (May 28, 2016); Mont-Royal 5-0 Lanaudière (June 5, 2016); Blainville 6-1 Gatineau (Oct. 2, 2016)
- Biggest away win: Lanaudière 2-7 Longueuil (June 11, 2016); Lanaudière 0-5 Blainville (July 23, 2016)
- All statistics correct as of October 24, 2016.

The 2016 Première ligue de soccer du Québec season is the fifth season of play for the Première ligue de soccer du Québec; the highest level of soccer based in the Canadian province of Québec and one of two Division 3 semi-professional soccer leagues in the Canadian soccer pyramid (the other being League1 Ontario).

CS Mont-Royal Outremont was the defending champion from 2015 and won the title again this season.

== Changes from 2015 ==
The league will again feature seven teams, as in 2015. In December 2015, the league announced that FC L'Assomption-Lanaudière had dropped out of the league and that the club's regional soccer association, ARS Lanaudière, would field a new club in the PLSQ called FC Lanaudière. This club is meant to represent the whole Lanaudière region, and is supported by the association's 14 clubs, including L'Assomption-Lanaudière.

== Teams ==
The following seven teams will take part in the 2016 season:

Team	City	Stadium	Founded	Joined	Head Coach
AS Blainville	Blainville, Laurentides	Parc Blainville	1986	2012	(France) Jean-Pierre Ceriani
FC Gatineau	Gatineau, Outaouais	Terrain Mont-Bleu	?	2013	(Tunisia) Nabil Aouadi
Lakeshore SC	Kirkland, Montréal	John Abbott College	1966	2015	(United States) Bill Sedgewick
FC Lanaudière	Terrebonne, Lanaudière	Multiple venues	2016	2016	(Canada) Andrew Olivieri
CS Longueuil	Longueuil, Montérégie	Centre Multi Sport	1970	2013	(France) Anthony Rimasson
CS Mont-Royal Outremont	Mount Royal, Montréal	REC Mont-Royal	?	2013	(Canada) Luc Brutus
Ottawa Fury FC Academy	Ottawa, Ontario	Algonquin College	2013	2015	(Serbia) Darko Buser

Locations of PLSQ clubs in the 2016 season.

== Standings ==
Each team plays 18 matches as part of the season; three against every other team in the league. There are no playoffs; the first-place team is crowned as league champion at the end of the season and faces the League1 Ontario league champion in the Inter-Provincial Cup.

Pos	Team	Pld	W	D	L	GF	GA	GD	Pts	Qualification
1	CS Mont-Royal Outremont	18	14	2	2	52	18	+34	44	Inter-Provincial Cup vs L1O Champion
2	AS Blainville	18	11	4	3	45	18	+27	37	
3	Lakeshore SC	18	7	6	5	25	21	+4	27	
4	FC Gatineau	18	6	4	8	18	30	−12	22	
5	CS Longueuil	18	4	5	9	27	41	−14	17	
6	FC Lanaudière	18	4	3	11	22	43	−21	15	
7	Ottawa Fury FC Academy	18	4	2	12	20	38	−18	14	

Source: TSI Sports

== Cup ==
The cup tournament is a separate contest from the rest of the season, in which all seven teams from the league take part, and is unrelated to the season standings. It is not a form of playoffs at the end of the season (as is typically seen in North American sports), but is a competition running in parallel to the regular season (similar to the Canadian Championship or the FA Cup), albeit only for PLSQ teams. All matches are separate from the regular season, and are not reflected in the season standings.

The 2016 PLSQ Cup will maintain the same format as the previous seasons, as a two-game aggregate knockout tournament with a single match final. As defending champion, Lakeshore SC will obtain a bye for the first round.

First round
1	Lakeshore SC
8	(BYE)
4	Ottawa Fury FC Academy	2	0	2
5	FC Gatineau	2	3	5
2	FC Lanaudière	3	1	4
7	CS Mont-Royal Outremont	4	3	7
3	CS Longueuil	0	0	0
6	AS Blainville	4	1	5

Semifinals
Lakeshore SC	1	1	2
FC Gatineau	2	2	4
CS Mont-Royal Outremont	2	1	3
AS Blainville	3	2	5

Finals
FC Gatineau	0
AS Blainville	4

=== First round ===
June 18, 2016	Ottawa Fury FC Academy	2 - 2	FC Gatineau	Algonquin College
3:00 pm	Kaizer 29'; Malekos 59'	Report	Garcia Lobo 3'; Dagnogo 25'

July 17, 2016	FC Gatineau	3 - 0	Ottawa Fury FC Academy	Mont-Bleu 4
5:00 pm	Kulic 23'; Dagnogo 34'; Basiala 90'	Report

FC Gatineau wins 5-2 on aggregate.

June 18, 2016	FC Lanaudière	3 - 4	CS Mont-Royal Outremont	Armand Corbeil
4:00 pm	Grondin 65'; Syla 74', 79'	Report	Sissoko 2'; Oliveri 22'; Moojen 40', 68'

July 17, 2016	CS Mont-Royal Outremont	3 - 1	FC Lanaudière	TMR REC 3
6:30 pm	Moojen 34'; François 56'; Dias 79'	Report	Syla 38'

CS Mont-Royal Outremont wins 7-4 on aggregate.

June 18, 2016	CS Longueuil	0 - 4	AS Blainville	Laurier 1
6:00 pm		Report	Moulinas 33'; Aboulhamid 42', 87' (pen.); Mayard 63' (pen.)

July 17, 2016	AS Blainville	1 - 0	CS Longueuil	Parc Blainville 1
6:00 pm	Aboulhamid 82'	Report

AS Blainville wins 5-0 on aggregate.

=== Semifinals ===
August 14, 2016	FC Gatineau	2 - 1	Lakeshore SC	Mont-Bleu 4
5:00 pm	Maheu 11', 71'	Report	Perico 6'	Attendance: 200

September 10, 2016	Lakeshore SC	1 - 2	FC Gatineau	Smiley
2:00 pm	Kaniki 87'	Report	Maheu 31'; Dagnogo 90+4'	Referee: Robert Schaap

FC Gatineau wins 4-2 on aggregate.

August 14, 2016	AS Blainville	3 - 2	CS Mont-Royal Outremont	Parc Blainville 1
7:00 pm	Mayard 21', 70'; Leconte 80'	Report	Sissoko 39'; François 90'

September 11, 2016	CS Mont-Royal Outremont	1 - 2	AS Blainville	TMR REC 3
6:30 pm	François 31'	Report	Mayard 10'; Redjradj 44'	Referee: Francis Latulippe

AS Blainville wins 5-3 on aggregate.

=== Final ===
October 29, 2016	FC Gatineau	0 - 4	AS Blainville	Terrebonne
6:30 pm		Report	Sylla 4'; Mayard 45+1', 74'; Vela Galeano 86'

== Inter-Provincial Cup Championship ==
The Inter-Provincial Cup Championship was a two-legged home-and-away series between the league champions of League1 Ontario and the Première ligue de soccer du Québec – the only Division 3 men's semi-professional soccer leagues based fully within Canada.

November 5, 2016
8:00pm

CS Mont-Royal Outremont	1–1	Vaughan Azzurri
Rosa 24'	Report	Kovacevic 57'

Complexe Sportifs Terrebonne, Terrebonne
November 12, 2016
8:00pm

Vaughan Azzurri	1–2	CS Mont-Royal Outremont
Lowe 14'	Report	Ritch-Andy 41'; Oliveri 67'

Pickering Soccer Complex, Pickering

CS Mont-Royal Outremont won 3–2 on aggregate

== Statistics ==
=== Top Goalscorers ===
Rank	Player	Club	Goals
1	(Canada) Frederico Moojen	CS Mont-Royal Outremont	21
1	(Canada) Pierre-Rudolph Mayard	AS Blainville	21
3	(Canada) Dex Kaniki	Lakeshore SC	10
4	(Canada) Sean Rosa	CS Mont-Royal Outremont	9
5	(France) Maxime Oliveri	CS Mount Royal Outremont	7
5	(Canada) Mitchell Syla	FC Lanaudière	7
7	(Algeria) Karim Ourzdine	CS Longueuil	6
7	(Canada) Gabriel Bitar	Ottawa Fury FC Academy	6
7	(Canada) Rida Aboulhamid	AS Blainville	6
7	(Mali) Adama Sissoko	CS Mont-Royal Outremont	6

=== Top Goalkeepers ===
Rank	Player	Club	Minutes	GAA
1	(Canada) Francis Monongo	CS Mont-Royal Outremont	720	0.75
2	(Canada) Andrew MacRae	Ottawa Fury FC Academy	450	0.80
3	(Canada) Jean-Lou Gosselin	AS Blainville	1530	0.94
4	(Haiti) Gabard Fénélon	Lakeshore SC	1066	1.01
5	(Canada) Jason Stock	CS Mont-Royal Outremont	630	1.14
6	(Cameroon) Horace Sobze Zemo	FC Gatineau	1035	1.57
7	(Canada) Remo Taraschi	Lakeshore SC	509	1.59
8	(Republic of the Congo) Erwann Ofouya	FC Gatineau	585	1.85
9	(Canada) Frederick Nadeau	CS Longueuil	450	2.00
10	(United States) Gregory Walters	FC Lanaudière	1218	2.07

Minimum 450 minutes played. Source:

== Awards ==
Award	Player (club)	Ref
Ballon d'or (Best Player)	Pierre-Rudolph Mayard (AS Blainville)	
Ballon d'argent (2nd Best Player)	Maxime Oliveri (CS Mont-Royal Outremont)	
Ballon de bronze (3rd Best Player)	Frederico Moojen (CS Mont-Royal Outremont)	
Golden Boot (Top Scorer)	Frederico Moojen (CS Mont-Royal Outremont); Pierre-Rudolph Mayard (AS Blainville)	
Coach of the Year	Emmanuel Macagno (AS Blainville)	

== Reserve Division ==
The league operated a reserve division.

Pos	Team	Pld	W	D	L	GF	GA	GD	Pts
1	AS Blainville Reserves	12	9	2	1	32	12	+20	29
2	CS Mont-Royal Outremont Reserves	12	7	2	3	29	18	+11	23
3	FC Gatineau Reserves	12	7	1	4	19	17	+2	22
4	Lakeshore FC Reserves	12	4	5	3	26	21	+5	17
5	CS Longueuil Reserves	12	4	2	6	25	26	−1	14
6	Ottawa Fury FC Academy Reserves	12	2	2	8	17	30	−13	8
7	FC Lanaudière Reserves	12	2	0	10	14	38	−24	6

Source: http://www.tsisports.ca/soccer/archiveLigue/l_classam.aspx
