= Chakib Hocine =

Algerian footballer (born 1991)

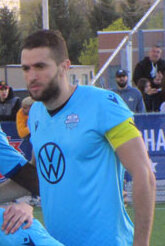
- Hocine with HFX Wanderers in 2019

Personal information
- Full name: Chakib Nazim Hocine
- Date of birth: 8 August 1991 (age 35)
- Place of birth: Algiers, Algeria
- Height: 1.96 m (6 ft 5 in)
- Position: Centre-back

Team information
- Current team: CS Lanaudière-Nord

Youth career
- 2002–2011: Saint-Léonard

Senior career*
Years	Team	Apps	(Gls)
2012	FC Brossard	17	(0)
2013	CS Mont-Royal Outremont	17	(3)
2014	Montreal Impact U23	9	(0)
2015	FC Montreal	9	(0)
2016	CS Mont-Royal Outremont	9	(1)
2017	FC Lanaudière	1	(0)
2017	Mississippi Brilla	14	(1)
2018	Ekenäs	19	(0)
2019	HFX Wanderers	4	(0)
2020	Valour FC	1	(0)
2021	CS Mont-Royal Outremont	6	(0)
2022	AS Blainville	0	(0)
2023	CS Lanaudière-Nord	4	(0)

Managerial career
- 2026–: CS Saint-Laurent
- * Club domestic league appearances and goals as of 30 September 2023

Chakib Nazim Hocine (born 8 August 1991) is a former Algerian footballer who played as a centre-back. He is currently the head coach of CS Saint-Laurent.

== Early life ==
Hocine was born in Algeria and moved to Canada with his parents as a baby.

== Playing career ==
=== Brossard ===
Hocine made his senior debut in 2012 with FC Brossard in the inaugural season of the Première Ligue de soccer du Québec, making 17 league appearances over the course of the season.

=== Mont-Royal Outremont ===
In 2013, Hocine signed with expansion side Mont-Royal Outremont, making 17 league appearances and scoring 3 goals.

=== Montreal Impact ===
Hocine spent the 2014 season in the Premier Development League (PDL) with Montreal Impact U23.

=== FC Montreal ===
In March 2015, Hocine made his USL debut as a starter in FC Montreal's inaugural match, a 2–0 loss to Toronto FC II.

=== Return to Mont-Royal ===
After being released by FC Montreal, Hocine returned to the PLSQ, signing with his former club Mont-Royal Outremont, making 9 league appearances and scoring one goal.

=== Lanaudière ===
In 2017, Hocine signed with Lanaudière, but only made one league appearance for the club.

=== Mississippi Brilla ===
Hocine played the 2017 PDL season with Mississippi Brilla, helping the club reach the National semi-finals.

=== Ekenäs ===
In January 2018, Hocine signed abroad for the first time with Finnish Ykkönen club Ekenäs IF.

=== HFX Wanderers ===
On 16 January 2019, it was announced that Hocine had signed with the HFX Wanderers ahead of the inaugural Canadian Premier League season. He made his debut for the Wanderers on May 16 in a Canadian Championship match against Vaughan Azzurri. On 14 December 2019, the club announced that Hocine would not be returning for the 2020 season.

=== Valour FC ===
Hocine joined fellow Canadian Premier League club Valour FC on July 20, 2020. On January 15, 2021, Valour announced that Hocine would not return for the 2021 season.

=== Third spell at Mont-Royal ===
In July 2021, Hocine rejoined Mont-Royal Outremont.
