= Kevin Chan-Yu-Tin =

Mauritian footballer

Personal information
- Full name: Kevin Dean Chan-Yu-Tin
- Date of birth: 11 July 1990 (age 36)
- Place of birth: Montreal, Quebec, Canada
- Height: 1.80 m (5 ft 11 in)
- Position: Midfielder

College career
Years	Team	Apps	(Gls)
2008–2009	Syracuse Orange	19	(0)
2010–2011	Montreal Carabins	13	(0)

Senior career*
Years	Team	Apps	(Gls)
2012–2013	FC Brossard	34	(1)
2013	Kaohsiung County Taipower		
2014	Mont-Royal Outremont	16	(0)
2015–2016	Lakeshore	29	(1)
2017–2018	Blainville	19	(0)

International career^{‡}
2006	Canada U17		
2016	Mauritius	3	(0)
- * Club domestic league appearances and goals as of 25 October 2018 ‡ National team caps and goals as of 16 July 2017

Kevin Dean Chan-Yu-Tin (born 11 July 1990) is a former footballer who played as a midfielder. Born in Canada, he represented the Mauritius national team.

== International career ==
Chan has been involved at youth level making an appearance for the Canada U-17 National Team at the 2006 CFU Youth Cup. He had also made appearances for the Quebec Provincial side, playing in both National and International tournaments.

Chan-Yu-Tin is eligible to play for Mauritius through his parents. In April 2016, Chan received a call up to the Mauritius national football team for their 2017 Africa Cup of Nations qualifier against Ghana, making an appearance as a substitute. He would make an additional two appearances, including one start in the 2016 COSAFA Cup.
