= 2016 Jubilee Trophy =

National Championships
- The Jubilee Trophy

Tournament details
- Country: Canada
- Date: October 5–10, 2016
- Teams: 10

Final positions
- Champions: Royal-Sélect de Beauport
- Runners-up: Richmond FC

Tournament statistics
- Matches played: 25
- Goals scored: 70 (2.8 per match)

Awards
- Best player: Léa Chastenay-Joseph

The 2016 Jubilee Trophy is the national championship for women's soccer clubs in Canada. It was held in St. John's, Newfoundland from October 5–10, 2016.

== Teams ==
Ten teams were granted entry into the competition; one from each Canadian province excluding Prince Edward Island. As host, Newfoundland and Labrador was permitted a second entry into the competition. This represents an increase of two teams from the eight sides that contested the 2015 Jubilee Trophy.

Teams are selected by their provincial soccer associations; most often qualifying by winning provincial leagues or cup championships such as the Ontario Cup.

Province	Team	Qualification
British Columbia	Richmond FC	BC Soccer Women's Provincial Championships
Alberta	Edmonton Northwest United SC	Alberta Soccer Provincial Championships
Saskatchewan	Saskatoon SK Impact FC	Saskatchewan Cup
Manitoba	Winnipeg WSA North Stars	Manitoba Cup
Ontario	Scarborough GS United	Ontario Cup
Quebec	Royal-Sélect de Beauport	Ligue de soccer élite du Québec Playoff Champion
New Brunswick	Fredericton Picaroons Reds	New Brunswick Premier Soccer League
Nova Scotia	Halifax Dunbrack	Nova Scotia Soccer League Premiership Cup
Newfoundland and Labrador	Holy Cross SC	Newfoundland and Labrador Jubilee Trophy
Newfoundland and Labrador	Kirby United SC	Newfoundland and Labrador Jubilee Trophy

== Group stage ==
The ten teams in the competition are divided into two groups of five teams each, which then play a single-game round-robin format. At the end of group play, each team faces the equal-ranked team from the other group to determine a final seeding for the tournament.

=== Group A ===
Pos	Team	Pld	W	D	L	GF	GA	GD	Pts	Qualification	(British Columbia) Richmond FC	(Alberta) Edmonton Northwest United SC	(Nova Scotia) Halifax Dunbrack	(Saskatchewan) Saskatoon SK Impact FC	(New Brunswick) Fredericton Picaroons Reds
1	(British Columbia) Richmond FC	4	3	0	1	3	2	+1	9	Advance to first place match	—		0–2		1–0
2	(Alberta) Edmonton Northwest United SC	4	3	0	1	6	1	+5	9	Advance to third place match	0–1	—	2–0	2–0	2–0
3	(Nova Scotia) Halifax Dunbrack	4	2	1	1	11	4	+7	7	Advance to fifth place match			—		7–0
4	(Saskatchewan) Saskatoon SK Impact FC	4	1	1	2	9	5	+4	4	Advance to seventh place match	0–1		2–2	—	7–0
5	(New Brunswick) Fredericton Picaroons Reds	4	0	0	4	0	17	−17	0	Advance to ninth place match					—

Source: http://www.canadasoccer.com/schedule-results-s15521
Rules for classification: 1) points; 2) head-to-head record; 3) goal difference

=== Group B ===
Pos	Team	Pld	W	D	L	GF	GA	GD	Pts	Qualification	(Quebec) QC	(Ontario) Scarborough GS United	(Newfoundland and Labrador) Holy Cross SC	(Newfoundland and Labrador) Kirby United SC	(Manitoba) Winnipeg WSA North Stars
1	(Quebec) Royal-Sélect de Beauport	4	2	2	0	8	1	+7	8	Advance to first place match	—	0–0	0–0	4–1	4–0
2	(Ontario) Scarborough GS United	4	2	2	0	5	1	+4	8	Advance to third place match		—	1–0	1–1	3–0
3	(Newfoundland and Labrador) Holy Cross SC	4	1	2	1	2	2	0	5	Advance to fifth place match			—	1–0	1–1
4	(Newfoundland and Labrador) Kirby United SC	4	1	1	2	3	6	−3	4	Advance to seventh place match				—	
5	(Manitoba) Winnipeg WSA North Stars	4	0	1	3	1	9	−8	1	Advance to ninth place match				0–1	—

Source: http://www.canadasoccer.com/schedule-results-s15521
Rules for classification: 1) points; 2) head-to-head record; 3) goal difference

== Final round ==
The final round consists of one game for each club, where they are paired with their equal-ranked opponent from the opposite group to determine a final ranking for the tournament.

Finals
1A	Richmond FC	0
1B	Royal-Sélect de Beauport	2

October 10, 2016 (gold) First place match	Richmond FC (British Columbia)	0–2	(Quebec) Royal-Sélect de Beauport	King George V Stadium
8:30 am		Report	Chastenay-Joseph; Verret

October 10, 2016 (bronze) Third place match	Edmonton Northwest United SC (Alberta)	1–1 (a.e.t.) (3–4 p)	(Ontario) Scarborough GS United	Topsail Field
11:15 am	Tracey	Report	Williams

October 10, 2016 Fifth place match	Halifax Dunbrack (Nova Scotia)	2–2 (a.e.t.) (3–2 p)	(Newfoundland and Labrador) Holy Cross SC	Topsail Field
8:30 am	Dekoe; Goodfellow	Report	Noseworthy

October 10, 2016 Seventh place match	Saskatoon SK Impact FC (Saskatchewan)	2–1	(Newfoundland and Labrador) Kirby United SC	Mt. Pearl Soccer Complex
11:30 am	Fuenzalida; Schenher	Report	Harris

October 10, 2016 Ninth place match	Fredericton Picaroons Reds (New Brunswick)	5–6	(Manitoba) Winnipeg WSA North Stars	Mt. Pearl Soccer Complex
8:30 am	Kenny; Strba	Report	Dyce; Kinnarath; Stewart; Q. Forzley

== Tournament ranking ==
Rank	Team
1st place, gold medalist(s)	(Quebec) Royal-Sélect de Beauport
2nd place, silver medalist(s)	(British Columbia) Richmond FC
3rd place, bronze medalist(s)	(Ontario) Scarborough GS United
4	(Alberta) Edmonton Northwest United SC
5	(Nova Scotia) Halifax Dunbrack
6	(Newfoundland and Labrador) Holy Cross SC
7	(Saskatchewan) Saskatoon SK Impact FC
8	(Newfoundland and Labrador) Kirby United SC
9	(Manitoba) Winnipeg WSA North Stars
10	(New Brunswick) Fredericton Picaroons Reds
