= Abraham François =

Canadian soccer player

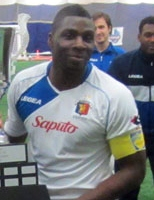
- François in 2016

Personal information
- Date of birth: June 7, 1977 (age 49)
- Place of birth: Montreal, Quebec, Canada
- Height: 5 ft 11 in (1.80 m)
- Position: Defender

Youth career
- Jean-Talon Rosemont

Senior career*
Years	Team	Apps	(Gls)
1997–1998	St. Louis Ambush	15	(0)
1997–1998	Detroit Rockers	8	(2)
1998	Huntsville Fire (indoor)	25	(4)
1999–2001	Montreal Impact	23	(1)
2001	→ Sol de América Asunción (loan)		
2001	Tien Giang F.C.		
2002	Ottawa Wizards	12	(0)
2003–2005	Montreal Impact	17	(2)
2005	Toronto Lynx	18	(1)
2006	Laval Dynamites	11	(0)
2007–2008	Detroit Ignition (indoor)	2	(0)
2012	FC L'Assomption	14	(0)
2013–2016	CS Mont-Royal Outremont	67	(3)
Total		185	(9)
- * Club domestic league appearances and goals

Abraham François (born 7 June 1977) is a Canadian former professional soccer player who played as a defender. He competed in the 1997 Canada Games with Quebec, winning the competition. He was then selected to represent Canada at the Francophonie Games in Madagascar, also winning the competition. His career spanned from 1998 to 2016.

== Club career ==
=== Early career ===
François joined his first club at the age of 7. After competing at the Canada Games and the Francophine Games in 1997, François was signed by St. Louis Ambush for an indoor football season, also playing in 15 games in the 1997/98 NPSLi season. François also scored 2 goals in 8 games for Detroit Rockers in the 1997/98 NPLSi season.

=== Montreal Impact ===
In 1999, François was subsequently recruited by his native hometown club, Montreal Impact of the USL A-League for football and indoor football seasons, beginning his professional career.

==== Sol de América (loan) ====
Whilst under contract with Montreal Impact, François was loaned to Primera División Paraguaya team Sol de América for six months. With François in the squad at Sol de América was Dante Lopez, 1998 FIFA World Cup player Aristides Rojas and 2010 FIFA World Cup player Enrique Vera.

=== Tien Giang ===
After playing in Paraguay, François went to Asia to sign with Tien Giang FC in the V-League.

=== Ottawa Wizards ===
In 2002, he returned home to sign with league giants the Ottawa Wizards of the Canadian Professional Soccer League.

During his tenure with Ottawa he had a tremendous season recording a 17-game undefeated streak, which marked a milestone in CPSL history by becoming the second club to achieve a treble the first being the Toronto Olympians. The Wizards clinched the Eastern Conference and finished first in the overall standings. They repeated their success in the Open Canada Cup tournament by defending their title once more in a 1–0 victory over Toronto Croatia. In the post season he appeared in all the playoff matches and reached the finals where the club faced the North York Astros, the Wizards ended up winning the playoff title in a 2–0 victory.

=== Return to Montreal Impact ===
François returned Montreal in 2003 helping the Impact finish second in the league behind the Milwaukee Wave United with a 16–6–6 record. In the playoffs the Impact fell to the Rochester Raging Rhinos in the first round of the playoffs by an aggregate score of 2–1. He managed to win a piece of silverware with the club the Voyageurs Cup.

In 2004, François was part of the Montreal Impact team which claimed the championship. He did not fully participate that season due to an injury, tearing his ligament in his right knee in a pre-season match against McGill University. Prior to the 2004 season, François played 45 minutes of a 2–1 pre-season friendly defeat against Italian team Reggina.

The team finished 17–6–5 record for 56 points in 28 games, and the team started with a record 12-game undefeated streak, which led to a USL A-League Championship against the Seattle Sounders in a 2–0 victory claiming their first Championship since 1994.

In 2005, he returned to the Impact, but was deemed surplus to Nick De Santis.

=== Toronto Lynx ===
On 19 May 2005, François was traded with teammate Sita-Taty Matondo to arch-rivals the Toronto Lynx in exchange for Ali Gerba. He made his debut with the club on May 28, 2005, against the Puerto Rico Islanders in a 4–4 draw. With the Lynx the team finished with a league worst 3 wins, 17 losses, and 8 ties and was the worst performance in league history and finished 12th place in the league.

=== Laval Dynamites ===
In 2006, François signed with the Laval Dynamites of the Canadian Soccer League, helping the franchise finish third in the National Division thus qualifying for the postseason; where the club faced Toronto Croatia, but lost to a score of 1–0.

=== Detroit Ignition ===
On October 26, 2007, he signed for the Detroit Ignition of the MISL. François term with Detroit came with some success finishing first in the regular season and reaching the semi-finals in the playoffs.

Following his retirement, François stated that physically he could have continued playing for one more year, but much traveling from the island of Montreal prevented this.

== International career ==
In 1997, François competed in the Canada Games with Quebec, winning the competition, and was then selected to represent Canada at the Francophonie Games in Madagascar, also winning the competition. At the 1997 Francophonie Games, François played alongside Patrice Bernier in the team. His best memory was defeating Cameroon 1–0 in the semi-finals of the competition.

François played futsal by the QCSL World Cup 2010.

== Personal life ==
François's father was a footballer in Haiti.

He was a coach for the Dragons of the Collège Saint-Jean Vianney.

== Honours ==
Ottawa Wizards

- CPSL Championship: 2002
- Open Canada Cup: 2002
- Canadian Professional Soccer League Eastern Conference Champions: 2002

Montreal Impact

- Voyageurs Cup: 2003, 2004

Mont-Royal Outremont

- Première Ligue de soccer du Québec: 2013, 2015, 2016
- PLSQ League Cup: 2013
- Inter-Provincial Cup: 2016
