= Emma Fletcher =

Canadian soccer player (born 1995)

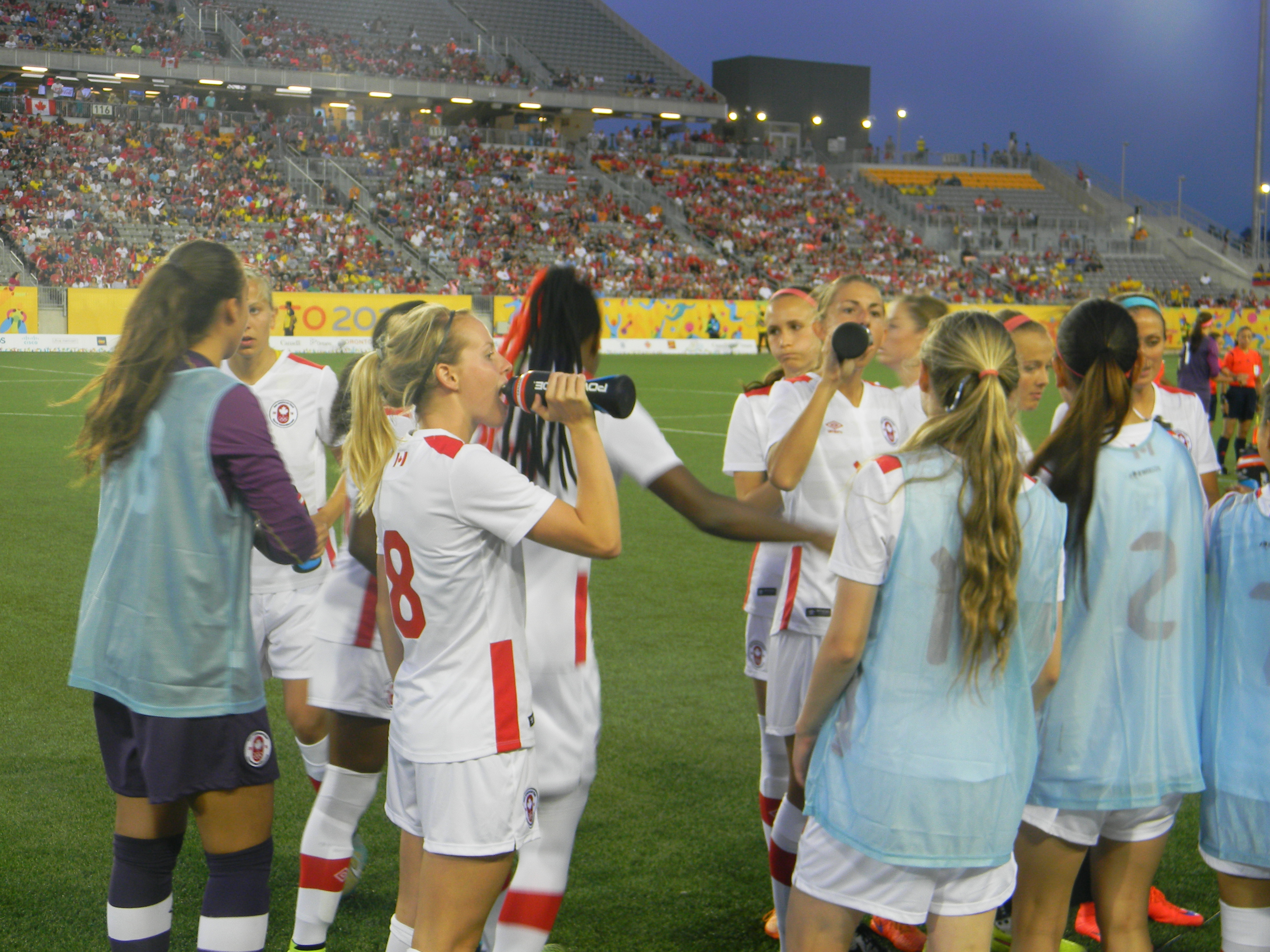
- Fletcher #8, during thengame against Colombia 2015

Personal information
- Full name: Emma Shane Fletcher
- Date of birth: February 4, 1995 (age 31)
- Place of birth: Victoria, British Columbia, Canada
- Height: 1.63 m (5 ft 4 in)
- Position: Midfielder

College career
Years	Team	Apps	(Gls)
2013–2014	LSU Tigers		
2015–2016	California Golden Bears		

Senior career*
Years	Team	Apps	(Gls)
2016	North Shore Girls SC		
2017	Arna-Bjørnar	16	(2)

International career^{‡}
2012	New Zealand U17	8	(0)
2014	Canada U20	4	(0)
2015	Canada	1	(1)
- * Club domestic league appearances and goals as of December 28, 2017 ‡ National team caps and goals as of July 16, 2015

Emma Shane Fletcher (born February 4, 1995) is a Canadian soccer player who played for Arna-Bjørnar in the Norwegian Toppserien.
