= CS Lanaudière-Nord =

Canadian semi-professional soccer club

- Full name: Club de soccer Lanaudière-Nord
- Nicknames: Noir et Or (Black and Gold)
- Founded: 2019 (merged club); 1986/2011(FC L'Assomption)
- League: Ligue3 Quebec
- 2025: L3Q, 11th (men); L2Q, 9th - relgated (women)
- Website: csln.ca
Home colours

CS Lanaudière-Nord is a Canadian semi-professional soccer club based in Joliette, Quebec that plays in Ligue3 Québec. The team previously played in the PLSQ from 2012 to 2015 as FC L'Assomption-Lanaudière prior to its merger.

The club was formed from a merger in 2019 between FC L'Assomption-Lanaudière, who played in the PLSQ from 2012 to 2015, and ARS Laser. In 2016, they left the PLSQ, being replaced by FC Lanaudière, which was supported by all 13 local clubs, before re-acquiring the license for the 2022 season. They departed Ligue1 Québec again after the 2023 season. They rejoined for the inaugural Ligue3 Quebec season in 2025, which acts as the third level of Ligue1 Québec.

== History ==
=== FC L'Assomption-Lanaudière ===
L'Assomption logo

L'Assomption-Lanaudière logo

In 2012, the semi-professional club was established to play in the newly formed Première Ligue de soccer du Québec, a Division III league, as one of the founding members. They entered under the name FC L'Assomption. They finished in second place in the league's inaugural season, behind champions FC St-Léonard. Striker Frederico Moojen finished as the league's top goalscorer in each of the league's first three seasons. Beginning in the 2014 season, they became known as FC L'Assomption-Lanaudière.

The club departed the league following the 2015 season. They were replaced by FC Lanaudière, which was organized by the Lanaudière regional soccer association, supported by the region's 14 member clubs, including L'Assomption.

=== CS Lanaudière-Nord ===
original CS Lanaudière-Nord logo

In 2019, the club merged with another local club, l'Association de soccer Le Laser, to form the Club de Soccer Lanaudière-Nord. In September 2023, they became a partner club of the CF Montréal Academy.

In 2021, after acquiring their provincial license, they requested and were granted the transfer of the PLSQ license from FC Lanaudière back to the club, beginning in the 2022 season. They played their first match on May 7, losing 2-1 to CS St-Hubert. They withdrew from the league after the 2023 season.

CS Lanaudière-Nord rejoined the League1 Canada structure in Ligue3 Québec for the inaugural season in 2025, the third tier of Ligue1 Québec.

== Seasons ==
as FC L'Assomption-Lanaudière

Season	League	Teams	Record	Rank	League Cup	Ref
2012	Première Ligue de soccer du Québec	5	7–4–5	2nd	–	
2013	Première Ligue de soccer du Québec	7	7–2–9	5th	Group Stage	
2014	Première Ligue de soccer du Québec	6	8–3–9	4th	Quarter-finals	
2015	Première Ligue de soccer du Québec	7	5–2–11	6th	Quarter-finals	

as CS Lanaudière-Nord

Season	League	Teams	Record	Rank	League Cup	Ref
2022	Première Ligue de soccer du Québec	12	3–3–16	11th	did not qualify	
2023	Ligue1 Québec	12	0–2–20	12th	Semi-finals	
2024	on hiatus					
2025	Ligue3 Québec	16	4–1–10	11th	–	

Women

Season	League	Teams	Record	Rank	Playoffs	League Cup	Ref
2025	Ligue2 Québec	19	0–3–5	19th (relegated)	–	–	

== Notable former players ==
The following players have either played at the professional or international level, either before or after playing for the PLSQ team:

- (Ivory Coast) Jean-Louis Bessé
- (Canada) Abraham François
- (Algeria) Chakib Hocine
- (Gabon) Nicolas Lesage
- (Canada) Pierre-Rudolph Mayard
- (Canada) Frederico Moojen
- (Senegal) Babacar Ndiour
- (Canada) Cristian Nuñez
- (Canada) António Ribeiro
- (Cuba) Eduardo Sebrango

== Coaching history ==
- (Canada) Jean-Robert Toussaint (2012)
- (Canada) (Costa Rica) Marco Antonio Torrens (2013)
- (Canada) (Cuba) Eduardo Sebrango(2014)
- (Canada) (Costa Rica) Marco Antonio Torrens (2014–2015)
- (Canada) (France) Aziz Dieng (2022–2023)

== See also ==
- FC Lanaudière
