= 2014 Jubilee Trophy =

Challenge Cup Nationals

Tournament details
- Country: Canada
- Teams: 8

Final positions
- Champions: Edmonton Victoria
- Runners-up: Surrey United SC

The 2014 Jubilee Trophy was hosted in Vaughan, Ontario, from October 9 to 13, 2014. It is the Canadian national championship for women's amateur soccer teams.

== Teams ==
- (British Columbia) Surrey United
- (Alberta) Edmonton Victoria
- (Manitoba) Action FC
- (Ontario) Scarborough GS United
- (Ontario) Vaughan Azzurri
- (Quebec) Delta de Laval
- (Nova Scotia) Halifax Dunbrack
- (Newfoundland and Labrador) Kirby United FC

== Group stage ==
Teams were separated into two groups of four during the first stage of the tournament. All teams advanced to play the same-ranked team from the opposite group to determine a final seeding for the tournament.

=== Group A ===
Pos	Team	Pld	W	D	L	GF	GA	GD	Pts
1	Edmonton Victorias	3	2	1	0	4	2	+2	7
2	Kirby United FC	3	1	2	0	6	4	+2	5
3	Scarborough GS United	3	0	2	1	1	2	−1	2
4	Vaughan Azzurri	3	0	1	2	1	4	−3	1

Standings source:

October 09, 2014
4:30pm

Edmonton Victorias	1–0	Vaughan Azzurri

Soccer Centre
October 09, 2014
6:30pm

Scarborough GS United	1–1	Kirby United FC

Soccer Centre
October 10, 2014
4:00pm

Edmonton Victorias	2–2	Kirby United FC

Vaughan Grove
October 10, 2014
7:00pm

Scarborough GS United	0–0	Vaughan Azzurri

Vaughan Grove
October 11, 2014
2:00pm

Edmonton Victorias	1–0	Scarborough GS United

Vaughan Grove
October 11, 2014
4:00pm

Kirby United FC	3–1	Vaughan Azzurri

Vaughan Grove

=== Group B ===
Pos	Team	Pld	W	D	L	GF	GA	GD	Pts
1	Surrey United SC	3	3	0	0	10	0	+10	9
2	Delta de Laval	3	2	0	1	2	5	−3	6
3	Halifax Dunbrack	3	1	0	2	5	4	+1	3
4	Action FC	3	0	0	3	0	8	−8	0

Standings source:

October 09, 2014
12:30pm

Delta de Laval	1–0	Action FC

Soccer Centre
October 09, 2014
2:30pm

Surrey United SC	3–0	Halifax Dunbrack

Soccer Centre
October 10, 2014
12:00pm

Delta de Laval	1–0	Halifax Dunbrack

Vaughan Grove
October 10, 2014
2:00pm

Surrey United SC	2–0	Action FC

Vaughan Grove
October 11, 2014
10:00am

Delta de Laval	0–5	Surrey United SC

Vaughan Grove
October 11, 2014
12:00pm

Kirby United FC	5–0	Action FC

Vaughan Grove

== Final round ==
October 13, 2014
9:00am
1st place match

Edmonton Victorias	1–0	Surrey United SC
Kayla Michaels 57'

Soccer Centre
October 13, 2014
8:30am
3rd place match

Kirby United FC	0–2	Delta de Laval

Vaughan Grove
October 13, 2014
10:30am
5th place match

Scarborough GS United	1–3	Halifax Dunbrack

Hershey 2
October 10, 2014
8:00am
7th place match

Vaughan Azzurri	0–3	Action FC

Hershey 1
