= Babacar Ndiour =

Senegalese footballer (born 1988)

Personal information
- Date of birth: 8 August 1988 (age 38)
- Place of birth: Dakar, Senegal
- Height: 1.89 m (6 ft 2 in)
- Position: Defender

Senior career*
Years	Team	Apps	(Gls)
2007–2010	AS Douanes		
2011–2013	ASC Diaraf		
2013	TB Tvøroyri	26	(3)
2014	Al Akhdar SC		
2014–2015	AS Gabès	20	(3)
2015–2016	EO Sidi Bouzid	19	(0)
2016	Olympique Béja	4	(0)
2016–2019	Al Sahel SC		
2019–??	Da Grande		
2022	CS Lanaudière-Nord	15	(1)
2023	CS St-Hubert	2	(0)

International career
2010	Senegal	1	(0)
- * Club domestic league appearances and goals

Babacar Ndiour (born 28 January 1988) is a Senegalese footballer who played as a defender. He was capped once for Senegal.

Going to the Faroe Islands, Ndiour trained with B68 Toftir, but the paperwork for a transfer did not go through. In January 2013 he signed for TB Tvøroyri. The club also signed Ndiour's compatriot Ndende Adama Gueye. Ndiour did not continue past his first season, as TB were relegated.
