= AS St-Léonard =

Semi-professional soccer club

- Full name: Association Soccer de Saint-Léonard
- Founded: 1978
- League: Ligue2 Québec
- 2025: L2Q, 19th (relegated)
- Website: https://www.soccer-stleonard.com/

AS Saint-Léonard is a Canadian semi-professional soccer club based in Saint-Leonard, Quebec that plays in the Ligue2 Québec.

== History ==
The club was originally formed in 1978. Prior to joining the PLSQ, the club played in the Ligue de Soccer Elite Quebec, which is the top amateur division in Quebec.

In 2012, the semi-professional club was established to play in the newly formed Première Ligue de soccer du Québec, a Division III league, as one of the founding members. They won the inaugural PLSQ championship, coming in first place out of the five teams. In 2013, they played an exhibition match against the Haiti national football team. The club did not return for the 2014 PLSQ season, due to the high financial costs associated with operating a team.

== Seasons ==
Season	League	Teams	Record	Rank	League Cup	Ref
2012	Première Ligue de soccer du Québec	5	8–4–4	Champions	–	
2013	Première Ligue de soccer du Québec	7	11–3–4	2nd	Group Stage	
2014–2024	on hiatus					
2025	Ligue2 Québec	24	6–3–14	19th (relegated)	–	

== Notable former players ==
The following players have either played at the professional or international level, either before or after playing for the PLSQ team:

- (Canada) Massimo Di Ioia
- (Haiti) Gabard Fénélon
- (Canada) Sandro Grande
- (Canada) Elkana Mayard
- (Canada) Pierre-Rudolph Mayard
- (Canada) Rocco Placentino

== Honours ==
- PLSQ Championship (1): 2012
