= British Columbia Provincial Soccer Championship =

Soccer tournament

The British Columbia Provincial Soccer Championship is a soccer tournament organized by the British Columbia Soccer Association. The "A" tournament winners advance to Canada Soccer's National Championships for the Challenge Trophy (men) Jubilee Trophy women. It has a history of 122 years and the men's 'A' championship competes for the 90-year-old Province Cup trophy. Teams qualify by final league standings or by winning their league cup. The number of berths and team seeding each league is awarded in each year's competition is determined annually by the Adult Competitions Committee. The cup competition brackets are created by a publicly accessible or open random draw out of a "hat". The format is a single elimination style tournament.

== Champions ==
British Columbia Cup

- 1892 Nanaimo Rangers
- 1893 Nanaimo Ranger
- 1894 Victoria Wanderers
- 1895 Nanaimo Rangers
- 1896 Victoria Wanderers
- 1897 Victoria Wanderers
- 1898 Wellington Rovers
- 1899 Wellington Rovers
- 1900 Victoria AFC
- 1901 Victoria AFC
- 1902 Victoria AFC
- 1903 Nanaimo
- 1904 Garrison
- 1905 Garrison
- 1906 Garrison
- 1907 Ladysmith
- 1908 Nanaimo United
- 1909 Ladysmith

McBride Shield

- 1911 Victoria West FC
- 1912 Coquitlam Ranchers
- 1913 no winner declared
- 1914 no winner declared
- 1915 Coquitlam Rangers
- 1916 Vancouver St. Andrews FC
- 1917 no winner declared
- 1918 no winner declared
- 1919 Wallace Shipyard
- 1920 Cumberland United
- 1921 Cumberland

Province Cup

- 1922 Vancouver St. Andrews FC
- 1923 Ladysmith FC
- 1924 Ladysmith FC
- 1925 Cumberland FC
- 1926 Nanaimo City FC
- 1927 Nanaimo FC Wanderers
- 1928 Ladysmith FC
- 1929 Westminster Royals FC
- 1930 Westminster Royals FC
- 1931 Westminster Royals FC
- 1932 Nanaimo City FC
- 1933 North Shore United FC
- 1934 Nanaimo City FC
- 1935 Vancouver St. Saviours
- 1936 Westminster Royals FC
- 1937 North Shore United FC
- 1938 North Shore United FC
- 1939 Vancouver St. Saviours
- 1940 Vancouver Radials FC
- 1941 North Shore United FC
- 1942 Vancouver Boeing FC
- 1943 Vancouver Pro-Rec FC
- 1944 North Shore United FC
- 1945 North Shore United FC
- 1946 North Shore United FC
- 1947 Vancouver St. Andrews FC
- 1948 North Shore United FC
- 1949 North Shore United FC
- 1950 Vancouver St. Andrews FC
- 1951 Vancouver St. Andrews FC
- 1952 Vancouver City FC
- 1953 Vancouver City FC
- 1954 Vancouver Firefighters FC
- 1955 Vancouver Firefighters FC
- 1956 Vancouver Hale-Co
- 1957 Vancouver Firefighters FC
- 1958 Vancouver Capilano FC
- 1959 Vancouver Capilano FC
- 1960 North Shore Carling's
- 1961 Vancouver Firefighters FC
- 1962 Vancouver Firefighters FC
- 1963 Vancouver Firefighters FC
- 1964 Vancouver Columbus FC
- 1965 Vancouver Firefighters FC
- 1966 North Shore Luckies FC
- 1967 Vancouver Firefighters FC
- 1968 Vancouver Columbus FC
- 1969 Vancouver Columbus FC
- 1970 Croatia SC Vancouver
- 1971 Vancouver Eintracht
- 1972 Westminster Blues SC
- 1973 Vancouver Firefighters FC
- 1974 Vancouver Lobban's FC
- 1975 Victoria London Boxing Club
- 1976 Victoria West FC
- 1977 Vancouver Italia Cdn. Columbus
- 1978 Vancouver Columbus FC
- 1979 Victoria West FC
- 1980 Victoria West FC
- 1981 Victoria West FC
- 1982 Victoria West FC
- 1983 Vancouver Firefighters FC
- 1984 Victoria West FC
- 1985 Croatia SC Vancouver
- 1986 Croatia SC Vancouver
- 1987 New Westminster QPR
- 1988 Norvan ANAF #45
- 1989 Westside Primo SC
- 1990 Vancouver Firefighters FC
- 1991 Norvan ANAF #45
- 1992 Norvan ANAF #45
- 1993 Westside Rino
- 1994 Coquitlam SC Metro Ford
- 1995 North Shore Pegasus
- 1996 Vancouver Westside CIBC
- 1997 North Shore Pegasus
- 1998 Vancouver Firefighters FC
- 1999 Coquitlam Metro-Ford SC
- 2000 Vancouver Westside Rino's
- 2001 Victoria Gorge FC
- 2002 Victoria Gorge FC
- 2003 Surrey United SC
- 2004 Surrey Pegasus FC
- 2005 Vancouver Portuguese SC
- 2006 Sapperton Rovers
- 2007 Vancouver Columbus Clan FC
- 2008 Victoria Gorge FC
- 2009 West Van FC
- 2010 Victoria Gorge FC
- 2011 Surrey ICST Pegasus
- 2012 Surrey United Firefighters
- 2013 Surrey United Firefighters
- 2014 Croatia SC Vancouver
- 2015 EDC FC Burnaby
- 2016 Surrey Pegasus FC
- 2017 Vancouver Club Inter FC
- 2018 Surrey BC Tigers Hurricanes
- 2019 Surrey Central City Breakers FC
- 2022 Surrey BB5 United (Note: formerly known as Central City Breakers FC)
- 2023 Surrey BB5 United

== Mainland Cup Winners ==
- 1914 Coquitlam
- 1915 Coquitlam Ranchers
- 1916 Vancouver St. Andrews FC
- 1917 231st Battalion
- 1918 Vancouver Coughlans
- 1919 Wallace Shipyards
- 1920 Wallace Shipyards
- 1921 Vancouver St. Andrews FC
- 1922 Vancouver St. Andrews FC
- 1923 University of British Columbia
- 1924 Vancouver St. Andrews FC
- 1925 Vancouver St. Andrews FC
- 1926 South Hill
- 1927 Empire Stevedores
- 1928 Westminster Royals FC
- 1929 Westminster Royals FC
- 1930 Vancouver St. Andrews FC
- 1931 North Shore United FC
- 1932 Vancouver Sons of Scotland
- 1933 Vancouver Chinese Students
- 1934 Nanaimo FC
- 1935 Nanaimo FC
- 1936 North Shore United FC
- 1937 Vancouver Johnston National
- 1938 Vancouver St. Andrews FC
- 1939 Vancouver St. Saviours FC
- 1940 North Shore United FC
- 1941 North Shore United FC
- 1942 Vancouver St. Andrews FC
- 1943 Vancouver St. Saviours FC
- 1944 North Shore United FC
- 1945 Vancouver St. Saviours FC
- 1946 North Shore United FC
- 1947 Vancouver St. Andrews FC
- 1948 Vancouver City FC
- 1949 North Shore United FC
- 1951 Vancouver St. Andrews FC
- 1953 Westminster Royals
- 1954 Vancouver City FC
- 1955 Vancouver Firefighters FC

== Challenge Cup British Columbia Section Winners ==
- 1947 Vancouver St. Andrews FC
- 1948 Vancouver St. Andrews FC
- 1949 North Shore United FC
- 1950 Vancouver City FC
- 1951 Vancouver St. Andrews FC
- 1952 Westminster Royals FC
- 1953 Westminster Royals FC
- 1954 North Shore United FC
- 1955 Westminster Royals FC
- 1956 Vancouver Hale-Co FC
- 1957 North Shore United FC
- 1958 Westminster Royals FC
- 1959 Westminster Royals FC
- 1960 Westminster Royals FC

== Women's Province Cup champions ==
- 1982 Burnaby Edmonds
- 1983 Richmond Olympic Superstars
- 1984 James Bay SC
- 1985 Richmond Kornerkicks
- 1986 Richmond Kornerkicks
- 1987 Coquitlam SC
- 1988 Coquitlam SC
- 1989 Surrey Strikers
- 1990 Coquitlam SC Strikers
- 1991 Surrey Marlins SC
- 1992 Surrey Marlins SC
- 1993 Surrey Marlins SC
- 1994 Coquitlam Strikers
- 1995 Victoria Gorge FC
- 1996 Vancouver UBC Alumni
- 1997 Vancouver UBC Alumni
- 1998 Vancouver UBC Alumni
- 1999 Vancouver UBC Alumni
- 2000 Vancouver UBC Alumni
- 2001 Burnaby Canadians FC
- 2002 Burnaby Canadians FC
- 2003 Vancouver UBC Alumni
- 2004 Surrey United SC
- 2005 Surrey United SC
- 2006 Surrey United SC
- 2007 Surrey United SC
- 2008 Surrey United SC
- 2009 Surrey United SC
- 2010 Surrey United SC
- 2011 Surrey United SC
- 2012 Surrey United SC
- 2013 Surrey United SC
- 2014 Surrey United SC
- 2015 North Shore Girls SC
- 2016 Richmond FC
- 2017 Surrey United SC
- 2018 Surrey United SC
- 2019 Coquitlam Metro-Ford SC

== See also ==
- Challenge Trophy
- Soccer in Canada
