= Armel Dagrou =

Burundian former footballer (born 1992)

Personal information
- Full name: Armel Dagrou Jr.
- Date of birth: 16 March 1992 (age 34)
- Place of birth: Montreal, Quebec, Canada
- Height: 1.82 m (6 ft 0 in)
- Position: Forward

Youth career
- 2010: Montreal Impact

College career
Years	Team	Apps	(Gls)
2010–2012	Montreal Carabins		
2013–2015	UQAM Citadins		

Senior career*
Years	Team	Apps	(Gls)
2012	FC Brossard	15	(6)
2013–2015	CS Mont-Royal Outremont	37	(10)
2016	AS Blainville	14	(5)
2019	CS Mont-Royal Outremont	5	(0)
2025–	CS Montréal Centre	3	(4)

International career^{‡}
2014	Burundi	1	(0)
- * Club domestic league appearances and goals as of 23 September 2025 ‡ National team caps and goals as of 1 June 2014

Armel Dagrou Jr. (born 16 March 1992) is a footballer who played as a forward for CS Montréal Centre in Ligue2 Québec. Born in Canada, he represented the Burundi national team.

== Early life ==
Dagrou was born in Montreal, Québec, to a Burundian mother and an Ivorian father. He lived in France, Belgium, and the Ivory Coast before settling in Gatineau when he was 16 years old.

He helped the Quebec team win gold at the 2009 Canada Games. In 2010, he joined the Montreal Impact Academy. In 2011, he was part of the Quebec U23 team that played a friendly against French club FC Metz U19.

== University career ==
Dagrou initially attended the University of Montreal, playing for the Carabins. In 2013, he switched to the Université du Québec à Montréal. In 2014, he was named a CIS first-team all-star as well as RSEQ MVP.

== Club career ==
In 2012, Dagrou played for FC Brossard in the Première ligue de soccer du Québec.

In 2013, he joined new PLSQ side CS Mont-Royal Outremont. He won two PLSQ titles with Mont-Royal in 2013 and 2015. In 2015, Mont-Royal participated in the Inter-Provincial Cup against League1 Ontario champions Oakville Blue Devils FC, with Dagrou scoring in the first leg.

In 2015, he went on trial with Swedish club IFK Luleå.

In 2016, he moved to AS Blainville.

In 2021, he played with Boucherville in the amateur Ligue de soccer élite du Québec, winning the men's AAA title and was the league's top scorer.

== International career ==
In 2014, he was invited to take part in the 2015 Africa Cup of Nations qualification with the Burundi national team, after he sent highlight videos to the national team coach. He made his debut on 1 June 2014, against Botswana in a 1–0 defeat.
