= North Shore Girls SC =

Canadian soccer team

- Full name: North Shore Girls Soccer Club
- League: Women's Premier Soccer League
- Website: https://www.nsgsc.com/

North Shore Girls Soccer Club was a Canadian women's soccer team based in North Vancouver, British Columbia that played in the Women's Premier Soccer League. The club continues to operate as a youth club.

== History ==
North Shore Girls SC was founded in 1986 as a youth soccer club.

In 2015, they hosted a pair of friendlies against the Cameroon national team.

In 2016, they added a team in the Women's Premier Soccer League. They made their debut on May 21, becoming the first Canadian team to play in the WPSL, against OSA Seattle FC, losing 4-1. They recorded their first victory on June 4, defeating Eugene Timbers FC Azul 3-1. The team featured many local Canadian players and a complement of NCAA players playing in the school summer break. The team did not return to the league in 2018.

== Seasons ==
Year	League	Record	Regular season	Playoffs	Ref
2016	WPSL	4–1–5	5th, Northwest	?	
2017	WPSL	4–2–2	3rd, Northwest	?	

== Notable former players ==
The following players have either played at the professional or international level, either before or after playing for the WPSL team:

- (Canada) Emma Fletcher
- (Canada) Selenia Iacchelli
- (Philippines) (Canada) Jaclyn Sawicki
