= Frederico Moojen =

Canadian soccer forward (born 1983)

Personal information
- Full name: Frederico Augusto Pieruccini Moojen
- Date of birth: February 25, 1983 (age 43)
- Place of birth: Balneário Camboriú, Brazil
- Height: 1.83 m (6 ft 0 in)
- Position: Forward

Youth career
- 1997–1998: Coritiba
- 2001–2004: Avaí

College career
Years	Team	Apps	(Gls)
2004–2005	Lincoln Memorial Railsplitters	34	(48)
2006	Clemson Tigers	18	(11)

Senior career*
Years	Team	Apps	(Gls)
2004–2005	Cocoa Expos	31	(28)
2006	Augusta FireBall	15	(18)
2007	Montreal Impact	14	(2)
2007–2009	New Jersey Ironmen (indoor)	34	(26)
2008	Minnesota Thunder	26	(2)
2009	New Jersey Ironmen (indoor)	7	(4)
2009	Chicago Storm (indoor)	12	(8)
2009–2010	GKP Gorzów Wielkopolski	7	(0)
2010	TTM Phichit	4	(?)
2010	Al-Seeb	12	(?)
2010–2011	Omaha Vipers (indoor)	19	(8)
2011–2013	Wichita Wings (indoor)	38	(40)
2012–2014	FC L'Assomption-Lanaudière	52	(48)
2013	Baltimore Blast (indoor)	7	(5)
2014–2015	Dallas Sidekicks (indoor)	20	(41)
2015–2017	CS Mont-Royal Outremont	52	(54)
2015–2016	St. Louis Ambush (indoor)	12	(10)
2016–2019	Florida Tropics SC (indoor)	47	(44)
2018–2019	CS Longueuil	25	(8)
2019	Utica City FC (indoor)	11	(7)
2019–2021	Dallas Sidekicks (indoor)	28	(27)

International career
2016–	Canada Futsal	10	(5)

Managerial career
- 2016–2018: Florida Tropics SC (player/assistant)
- 2018–: Canada arena (assistant)
- * Club domestic league appearances and goals

Frederico Augusto Pieruccini "Freddy" Moojen (born February 25, 1983) is a former soccer forward. Born in Brazil, he represented Canada at the international level in futsal.

He shared the 2005 and 2006 Premier Development League goals lead. He was also the 2006 PDL MVP and the 2006-2007 Major Indoor Soccer League Rookie of the Year. In 2012, 2013, 2014, 2015 and 2016 he was the PLSQ Golden Boot winner playing for the FC L'Assomption and Mont-Royal Outremont.

Moojen became a Canadian citizen in 2013, and has since appeared for the Canadian national futsal team.

== Youth ==
Born in Balneário Camboriú, Brazil, in 1997 Moojen played for Coritiba Foot Ball Club’s youth team. He was briefly with International FC in 2001 before signing with Avaí Futebol Clube, playing with them from 2001 to 2004. Moojen attended Lincoln Memorial University where he was a two-time Gulf South Conference Player of the Year and a 2005 NCAA Division II third team All American. He transferred to Clemson University where he played the 2006 NCAA Division I season. In 2004, he played for the Cocoa Expos in the fourth division Premier Development League. He returned to the Expos in 2005, scoring 18 goals tying him with Andy Metcalf as the league’s leading scorer. In 2006, Moojen played for the Augusta FireBall, sharing the goal scoring lead with John Cunliffe. He was also the 2006 PDL MVP.

== Professional ==
On January 25, 2007, the Montreal Impact of the USL First Division drafted Moojen. He signed with the Impact on March 1, 2007 and played fourteen games for the Impact before suffering from a season-ending injury. On April 21, 2008, he transferred from the Impact to the Minnesota Thunder in USL-1. Moojen was released by Thunder in February 2009, during the off-season.

On August 28, 2007, he signed with the New Jersey Ironmen of the Major Indoor Soccer League after the Ironmen selected him in the second round (18th overall) in the MISL College Draft. He was the 2007-2008 MISL Rookie of the Year. The MISL collapsed at the end of the season and Moojen and his team mates moved to the newly created Xtreme Soccer League. Moojen, slowed by a toe injury played only seven games, scoring four goals, for the Ironmen before being traded to the Chicago Storm for Randi Patterson on January 31, 2009.

He then moved to Poland, where he played in the colors of GKP Gorzów Wielkopolski. In the following year he went to play in the first division in Thailand and Oman. In 2011–12 he played with the Wichita Wings in the MISL. In the summer of 2012 he played in the first professional league in Quebec, the Première Ligue de soccer du Québec, for the FC L'Assomption where he was the league's leading scorer ("Golden Boot") and third best player ("Bronze Ball"). In the winter of 2012–13 he played his second season for the Wichita Wings in the Major Indoor Soccer League where he was the team's captain and leading scorer with 27 goals in 24 games. In 2013, he played again for the FC L'Assomption where he was the team's captain and league's leading scorer for the second consecutive year. In late 2013, Frederico Moojen signed a contract with the Baltimore Blast in the MISL and played with them for one season before the league dissolved.

He played outdoor for FC L'Assomption for his third consecutive season in the PLSQ. In late September 2014, Moojen signed a new indoor contract with the Dallas Sidekicks of the Major Arena Soccer League, scoring 41 goals in 20 games for the Sidekicks. Moojen was part of the Canadian National Arena soccer team that played in the Indoor Soccer World Cup in March 2015 scoring 7 goals in 3 games for Canada.

In 2015, he signed with Montreal club Mont-Royal Outremont and was the Première Ligue de soccer du Québec top scorer for the fifth consecutive year. During the 2015/2016 winter he played for the St. Louis Ambush in the Major Arena Soccer League where he was named assistant coach/player scoring 10 goals in 12 games played. He became the first player to reach 100 career goals in the PLSQ.

In 2016, Moojen began playing for the Florida Tropics SC during the winter in the new Indoor Professional League in the United States as a player-assistant coach. On 27 June 2018, Moojen extended his contract with the Tropics through 2020. Moojen had been the team's captain since its inception and left the team with more appearances than any other player.

On 2 November 2017, Moojen signed with CS Longueuil.

On 17 January 2019, the Florida Tropics traded Moojen to Utica City FC in exchange for Andre Braithwaite.

== International ==
Moojen was called by the Canadian National Futsal team to play in the 2016 CONCACAF Futsal Championship in Costa Rica. Moojen scored 5 goals in 3 games and was named the Top scorer of the tournament ( Golden Boot).
