= CS Mont-Royal Outremont =

Canadian soccer club

- Full name: Club Soccer Mont-Royal Outremont
- Nicknames: CSMRO, Les Griffons
- Founded: 1987
- Stadium: REC Mont-Royal
- President: Luc Brutus
- Head Coach: Luc Brutus
- League: Ligue1 Québec
- 2025: L1Q, 5th (men); L1Q, 5th; Playoffs, Champions (women)
- Website: https://csmro.ca
Home colours

Club Soccer Mont-Royal Outremont is a Canadian semi-professional soccer club based in Mount Royal, Quebec and in the Montreal borough of Outremont. Since 2013, and up until the 2026 season, the club has competed in Ligue1 Québec, and won a record-tying four titles. The club has been relegated at the end of the 2026 season to Ligue2 Québec, the leagues' first-ever relegation.Their women's team has competed in the women's division of the PLSQ since 2019.

== History ==
In 2013, the club joined the Première ligue de soccer du Québec, a Division III league, fielding a team in the men's division. During their inaugural season, they won both the League title and the League Cup.

They once again finished as league champions in 2015 and 2016. By winning the league title, they participated in the Inter-Provincial Cup, which was created in 2014, against the champion of League1 Ontario to determine the Canadian Division III champion. In 2015, they were defeated by the Oakville Blue Devils, but in 2016, they won the title by defeating Vaughan Azzurri.

They added a team in the women's division of the PLSQ for the 2019 season with Lakers du Lac Saint-Louis, which was run by the Association Régionale de Soccer du Lac St-Louis of which they are a member, transferring their team to CSMRO.

In 2019, the club partnered with Major League Soccer club CF Montréal, joining their Centre d'identification et perfectionnement (scouting and development centre). In 2025, they became an affiliate club of Canadian Premier League club Forge FC.

In 2021, they won their fourth PLSQ title, matching the record of AS Blainville, qualifying them for the 2022 Canadian Championship.

In 2024, they captured their first women's title, winning the league playoff series, qualifying them for the 2024 League1 Canada Women's Inter-Provincial Championship.

On July 16, 2026, it was announced that the women's team would be one of two semi-professional teams competing in the first W Canadian Championship in 2026, alongside Simcoe County Rovers FC and the six teams of the fully professional CPL.

On August 23, 2026, the men's team lost to CS St-Laurent, and was mathematically relegated to the lower-tier league.

== Seasons ==
Men

Season	League	Teams	Record	Rank	League Cup	Inter-Provincial Cup	Canadian Championship	Ref
2013	Première ligue de soccer du Québec	7	11–4–3	Champions	Champions	–	Not eligible	
2014	Première ligue de soccer du Québec	6	9–5–6	3rd	Semi-finals	did not qualify	Not eligible	
2015	Première ligue de soccer du Québec	7	11–3–4	Champions	Finalists	Finalists	Not eligible	
2016	Première ligue de soccer du Québec	7	14–2–2	Champions	Semi-finals	Champions	Not eligible	
2017	Première ligue de soccer du Québec	7	6–6–6	4th	Quarter-finals	–	Not eligible	
2018	Première ligue de soccer du Québec	8	14–3–4	2nd	Quarter-finals	–	did not qualify	
2019	Première ligue de soccer du Québec	9	11–4–1	2nd	Finalists	–	did not qualify	
2020	on hiatus – COVID-19							
2021	Première ligue de soccer du Québec	10 (Note: Ottawa South United withdrew from the 2021 league mid-way through due to government restrictions, with their matches removed from the standings. Thus, CS Mont-Royal Outremont's victory against Ottawa is not included in their record.)	13–1–2	Champions	–	–	did not qualify	
2022	Première ligue de soccer du Québec	12	12–5–5	4th	Semi-Finals	–	Preliminary round	
2023	Ligue1 Québec	12	12–5–5	3rd	Finalists	–	did not qualify	
2024	Ligue1 Québec	11	5–8–7	8th	Finalists	–	did not qualify	
2025	Ligue1 Québec	10	8–0–10	5th	Quarter-finals	–	did not qualify	
2026	Ligue1 Québec	12	4–5–12	12th	did not qualify	–		relegated to Ligue2

Women

Season	League	Teams	Record	Rank	Playoffs	League Cup	Inter-provincial Championship	Ref
2019	Première ligue de soccer du Québec	6	2–4–9	6th	–	–	–	
2020	on hiatus – COVID-19							
2021	Première ligue de soccer du Québec	10	3–2–4	6th	–	did not qualify	–	
2022	Première ligue de soccer du Québec	12	5–0–6	5th	–	did not qualify	did not qualify	
2023	Ligue1 Québec	12	2–6–3	9th	–	Quarter-finals	did not qualify	
2024	Ligue1 Québec	12	8–5–3	2nd, Group A (3rd overall)	Champions	–	Finalists	
2025	Ligue1 Québec	10	7–3–3	2nd, Group A (5th overall)	Champions	–	Finalists	

== Players and staff ==
=== Coaching staff ===
As of January 19, 2026

- (Canada) Luc Brutus – head coach
- (Canada) Eduard-Nick Pascalau - Goalkeeper coach
- (Canada) Julien Junet – assistant coach
- (Canada) James Rezile – assistant coach
- (Canada) Ludovic Godefroy – fitness coach
- (Canada) Sevan Ortaaslan – orthopedic surgeon
- (Canada) Manon Coté – doctor
- (Canada) Stephanie Liganor – physiotherapist

== Notable former players ==
The following players have either played at the professional or international level, either before or after playing for the PLSQ team:

Men

- (Greece) Dimitrios Anastasopoulos
- (Cameroon) Stephane Assengue
- (Canada) Jason Beaulieu
- (Canada) Nazim Belguendouz
- (Mauritius) Kevin Chan-Yu-Tin
- (Saint Vincent and the Grenadines) Lemus Christopher
- (Burundi) (Canada) Armel Dagrou
- (Switzerland) (Canada) John Dinkota
- (Haiti) Gabard Fénélon
- (Canada) Abraham François
- (Canada) Jems Geffrard
- (Algeria) (Canada) Chakib Hocine
- (France) Kévin Le Bras
- (Canada) Émile Legault
- (Canada) Zakaria Messoudi
- (Canada) Frederico Moojen
- (Canada) Protais Mutambala
- (Canada) Victor N'Diaye
- (Canada) Frantzly Zephirin

Women

- (Canada) Latifah Abdu
- (Canada) Mara Bouchard
- (Algeria) (Canada) Anaïs Oularbi
- (Canada) Anne-Valérie Seto
- (Canada) Julianne Vallerand
- (Canada) Jaylyn Wright

== Honours ==
- PLSQ Championship (3): 2013, 2015, 2016, 2021
- Coupe PLSQ (1): 2013
- Inter-Provincial Cup (1): 2016
