= 2009 Challenge Trophy =

2009 Canada Soccer National Championships
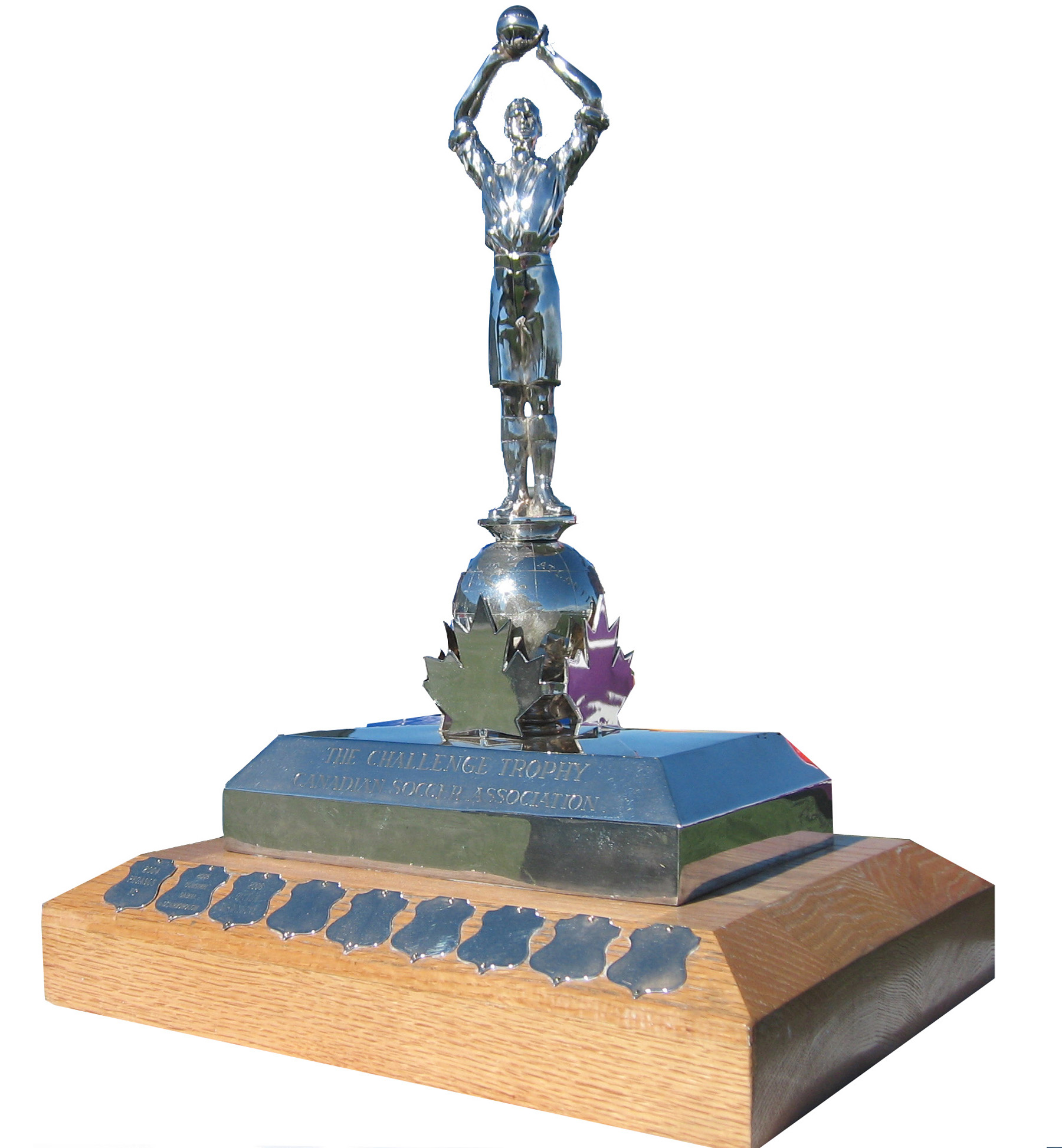
- The Challenge Trophy

Tournament details
- Country: Canada

Final positions
- Champions: Winnipeg Hellas SC (1st title)
- Runners-up: Royal-Sélect de Beauport

The 2009 Canada Soccer National Championships (officially the BMO National Championships for sponsorship reasons) was the 87th staging of Canada Soccer's amateur football club competition. Winnipeg Hellas SC won the Challenge Trophy after they beat Royal-Sélect de Beauport in the Canadian Final at the SaskTel Fieldhouse in Saskatoon on 12 October 2009.

Ten teams qualified to the final week of the 2009 National Championships in Saskatoon. Each team played four group matches before the medal and ranking matches on the last day. After a heavy snowstorm interrupted the schedule on 8 October, all matches were moved indoors and shortened to just 60 minutes each.

On the road to the National Championships, Winnipeg Hellas SC beat Winnipeg Lucania FC in the 2009 Manitoba Cup Final.

== Teams and rosters ==
The Nationals are seeded based on last seasons performance. For 2009 the seedings are:

1. AB - (Alberta) Calgary Callies
2. QC - (Quebec) Royal-Sélect de Beauport
3. PE - (Prince Edward Island) Avondale Islanders
4. BC - (British Columbia) West Van SC
5. ON - (Ontario) Real Toronto
6. NS - (Nova Scotia) Halifax City SC
7. NL - (Newfoundland and Labrador) Holy Cross Crusaders
8. MB - (Manitoba) Hellas SC
9. SK - (Saskatchewan) Huskie Alumni
10. YT - Yukon Selects
- Group A : Alberta, British Columbia, Ontario, Manitoba, Saskatchewan
- Group B : Quebec, Prince Edward Island, Nova Scotia, Newfoundland Labrador, Yukon

=== Hellas SC ===
Note: Flags indicate national team as defined under FIFA eligibility rules; some limited exceptions apply. Players may hold more than one non-FIFA nationality.

No.	Pos.	Nation	Player
11	MF	ITA	Fabio Capone
19	FW	GRE	Justin Castalanos
14	FW	CAN	Ulrick Disna
6	DF	GRE	Bill Economou
27	DF	CAN	Vinny Ferlaino
28	MF	CAN	Tom Findlay
15	MF	CAN	Tom Foderaro
27	FW	PAR	Andry Giesbrecht
4	MF	CAN	Jordan Goetting
16	MF	CAN	Dimitri Ifandis
1	GK	CAN	Kyle Kilcup

No.	Pos.	Nation	Player
5	MF	BIH	Edin Kurbegovic
21	MF	ESA	Jorge Mendez
3	DF	CAN	Tim Mullen
11	FW	CAN	Chris Musto
29	GK	CAN	Dylan O'Connor
10	DF	CAN	Trevor Perrault
3	DF	ITA	Phillip Porpiglia
8	MF	GRE	Yiannis Tsalatsidis
17	DF	COL	Jeff Valdivia

=== Royal-Sélect de Beauport ===
Note: Flags indicate national team as defined under FIFA eligibility rules; some limited exceptions apply. Players may hold more than one non-FIFA nationality.

No.	Pos.	Nation	Player
4	DF	CAN	Alexandre Lévesque-Tremblay
18	FW	TOG	Boris I Gervais Salou
15	FW	CAN	David Chapdelaine-Miller
8	DF	ARG	Édouardo Davalos
2	FW	FRA	Francois Ouellet
20	DF	CMR	Nyam A Well Garba
17	MF	FRA	Jean-Philippe Grenon
5	DF	FRA	Julien Meunier
14	MF	CGO	Michael Mana Nga
3	DF	CAN	Marc-Olier Boudreau-Daigle
12	FW	CAN	Mathieu-François

No.	Pos.	Nation	Player
7	FW	BIH	Nihad Nedzibovic
6	DF	CAN	Olivier Brett
16	DF	ITA	Pascal Bragagnolo
13	DF	CAN	Pierre-Henri Poudré
10	DF	MAR	Samir El Akkati
11	DF	FRA	Samuel Georget
22	GK	CAN	Vincent Dubé

=== Calgary Callies ===
Note: Flags indicate national team as defined under FIFA eligibility rules; some limited exceptions apply. Players may hold more than one non-FIFA nationality.

No.	Pos.	Nation	Player
1	GK		Dave Harrison
3	DF		Drew Milne
4	MF		Cenek Patik
5	DF		Andre Duberry
6	DF		Eric Roa
7	MF		Nic Reyes
8	DF		Jamie Auvigne
9	FW		Mark Slade
10	MF		Fran Miron
11	FW		Greg Perez

No.	Pos.	Nation	Player
12	DF		Liam deSilva
13	FW		Felix Napuri
14	FW		Scott McCorkill
15	MF		Alex Strbac
17	DF		Brett Colvin
18	DF		Neto Miguel
19	FW		Milan Timotjevic
10	MF		Chris Kooy
21	DF		Allen Jovica
22	GK		Will Langford

== Results ==
=== Group stage ===
Group A
Pos	Team	Pld	W	D	L	GF	GA	GD	Pts
1	(Manitoba) Hellas SC	4	3	0	1	5	4	+1	9
2	(Alberta) Calgary Callies	4	3	0	1	7	3	+4	9
3	(British Columbia) West Van FC	4	2	0	2	4	5	−1	6
4	(Saskatchewan) Huskies Alumni	4	1	1	2	5	4	+1	4
5	(Ontario) Real Toronto	4	0	1	3	3	8	−5	1

Group B
Pos	Team	Pld	W	D	L	GF	GA	GD	Pts
1	(Quebec) Royal-Sélect de Beauport	4	2	2	0	7	2	+5	8
2	(Prince Edward Island) Avondale Islanders	4	2	1	1	8	3	+5	7
3	(Newfoundland and Labrador) Holy Cross	4	1	3	0	7	2	+5	6
4	(Nova Scotia) Halifax City SC	4	1	2	1	5	5	0	5
5	Yukon Selects	4	0	0	4	1	16	−15	0

7 October 2009	West Van SC (British Columbia)	1-2	(Ontario) Real Toronto	Saskatoon, SK
16:00				Stadium: Umea East

7 October 2009	Calgary Callies (Alberta)	1-2	(Manitoba) Hellas SC	Saskatoon, SK
16:00				Stadium: Sasktel Sports Centre West

7 October 2009	Avondale Islanders (Prince Edward Island)	4-1	(Nova Scotia) Halifax City SC	Saskatoon, SK
18:00				Stadium: Umea West

7 October 2009	Royal-Sélect de Beauport (Quebec)	1-1	(Newfoundland and Labrador) Holy Cross	Saskatoon, SK
18:00				Stadium: Sasktel East

8 October 2009	Calgary Callies (Alberta)	1-0	(Saskatchewan) Huskie Alumni	Saskatoon, SK
14:00	Felix Napuri			Stadium: SaskTel Sports Centre

8 October 2009	West Van SC (British Columbia)	0-1	(Manitoba) Hellas SC	Saskatoon, SK
14:00			Tom Findlay	Stadium: SaskTel Sports Centre

8 October 2009	Royal-Sélect de Beauport (Quebec)	5-1	Yukon Selects	Saskatoon, SK
16:00	Ammon Hoefs		Boris; Gervais Salou (x3); Jean-Philippe Grenon	Stadium: SaskTel Sports Centre

8 October 2009	Avondale Islanders (Prince Edward Island)	0-0	(Newfoundland and Labrador) Holy Cross	Saskatoon, SK
16:00				Stadium: SaskTel Sports Centre

9 October 2009	Calgary Callies (Alberta)	3-1	(British Columbia) West Van SC	Saskatoon, SK
12:00				Stadium: SaskTel Sports Centre

9 October 2009	Real Toronto (Ontario)	2-2	(Saskatchewan) Huskie Alumni	Saskatoon, SK
12:00				Stadium: SaskTel Sports Centre

9 October 2009	Royal-Sélect de Beauport (Quebec)	2-0	(Prince Edward Island) Avondale Islanders	Saskatoon, SK
14:00				Stadium: SaskTel Sports Centre

9 October 2009	Halifax City SC (Nova Scotia)	3-0	Yukon Selects	Saskatoon, SK
14:00				Stadium: SaskTel Sports Centre

10 October 2009	Calgary Callies (Alberta)	2-0	(Ontario) Real Toronto	Saskatoon, SK
16:00				Stadium: SaskTel Sports Centre

10 October 2009	Hellas SC (Manitoba)	0-3	(Saskatchewan) Huskie Alumni	Saskatoon, SK
18:00				Stadium: SaskTel Sports Centre

10 October 2009	Royal-Sélect de Beauport (Quebec)	0-0	(Nova Scotia) Halifax City SC	Saskatoon, SK
18:00				Stadium: SaskTel Sports Centre

10 October 2009	Holy Cross (Newfoundland and Labrador)	5-0	Yukon Selects	Saskatoon, SK
18:00				Stadium: SaskTel Sports Centre

11 October 2009	West Van SC (British Columbia)	1-0	(Saskatchewan) Huskie Alumni	Saskatoon, SK
12:00				Stadium: SaskTel Sports Centre

11 October 2009	Real Toronto (Ontario)	0-2	(Manitoba) Hellas SC	Saskatoon, SK
12:00				Stadium: SaskTel Sports Centre

11 October 2009	Avondale Islanders (Prince Edward Island)	4-0	Yukon Selects	Saskatoon, SK
14:00				Stadium: SaskTel Sports Centre

11 October 2009	Halifax City SC (Nova Scotia)	1-1	(Newfoundland and Labrador) Holy Cross	Saskatoon, SK
14:00				Stadium: SaskTel Sports Centre

==== Finals ====
12 October 2009	Real Toronto (A5) (Ontario)	1-3 (pks)	Yukon Selects (B5)	Saskatoon, SK
08:00				Stadium: SaskTel Sports Centre

12 October 2009	Huskie Alumni (A4) (Saskatchewan)	3-4 (pks)	(Nova Scotia) Halifax City SC (B4)	Saskatoon, SK
08:00				Stadium: SaskTel Sports Centre

12 October 2009	West Van FC (A3) (British Columbia)	6-5 (pks)	(Newfoundland and Labrador) Holy Cross (B3)	Saskatoon, SK
10:00				Stadium: SaskTel Sports Centre

12 October 2009	Calgary Callies (A2) (Alberta)	3-4 (pks)	(Prince Edward Island) Avondale Islanders (B2)	Saskatoon, SK
12:30				Stadium: SaskTel Sports Centre

12 October 2009	Hellas SC (A1) (Manitoba)	1-0	(Quebec) Royal-Sélect de Beauport (B1)	Saskatoon, SK
12:30	Chris Musto	Report		Stadium: SaskTel Sports Centre; Referee: Dave Gantar

==== Final standings ====
Pos	Club
1	(Manitoba) Hellas SC
2	(Quebec) Royal-Sélect de Beauport
3	(Prince Edward Island) Avondale Islanders
4	(Alberta) Calgary Callies
5	(British Columbia) West Van FC
6	(Newfoundland and Labrador) Holy Cross
7	(Nova Scotia) Halifax City SC
8	(Saskatchewan) Huskies Alumni
9	Yukon Selects
10	(Ontario) Real Toronto

== Qualified teams ==
=== British Columbia ===
The BC Provincial Cup is held in the spring of the season. This year's event went from April 4 to May 16.

Sixteenth-final
Peace Arch SC	0
ICSF Inter	0
Columbus Clan FC	2
Abbotsford Mariners	0
NorVan Eagles	2
Sooke Celtic	1
Kamloops Excel	1
Gordon Head	5

Eight-final
Langley United	0
Croatia FC	1
CMF Wolves	7
Peace Arch SC	5
West Van SC	7
Westside FC	0
Surrey United	3
Columbus Clan FC	2
Bays United	1
Nanaimo	0
Athletic Club of BC	2
NorVan Eagles	1
Victoria Gorge FC	4
PoCo City FC	0
RCIU Legends	2
Gordon Head	1

Quarter-final
Croatia FC	0
CMF Wolves	2
West Van SC	2
Surrey United	0
Bays United	3
Athletic Club of BC	2
Victoria Gorge FC	2
RCIU Legends	0

Semi-final
CMF Wolves	0
West Van SC	2
Bays United	0
Victoria Gorge FC	5

Final
West Van SC	1
Victoria Gorge FC	0

=== Alberta ===
The Mike Traficante Challenge Cup will be held in Edmonton from 4 Sep to 7 Sep, 2009.info The teams will be seeded from the Alberta Major Soccer League. The groups will be S1, N2 and N3 in one and N1, S2 and S3 in the other. Seeds S3 and N3 are open to challenge from any district. This year, the teams in the AMSL include:

North:

- Edmonton Green & Gold
- Edmonton Drillers
- Edmonton Scottish
- Edmonton KC Trojans
- Edmonton Victoria

South:

- Calgary Callies
- Calgary Dinos
- Calgary Villains Elite
- Calgary PARS
- Lethbridge FC

AMSL Site

=== Saskatchewan ===
The Saskatchewan representative shall be determined through the Saskatchewan Premier Soccer League. Six teams will compete this season including:

- Yorkton United
- ACFC Milan
- SK Canada Games
- Huskie Alumni
- Saskatoon Hose and Hydrant
- Colo Colo

Standings as of 9 July 2009

Team	Pld	W	D	L	GF	GA	GD	Pts
Huskie Alumni	7	5	2	0	21	1	+20	17
ACFC Milan	7	5	1	1	14	5	+9	16
Yorkton United	8	5	0	3	22	10	+12	15
Saskatoon Hose and Hydrant	6	1	1	4	5	12	−7	4
Sk Canada Games	4	0	1	3	4	19	−15	1
Colo Colo	6	0	1	5	3	22	−19	1

The Saskatchewan Huskie Alumni have qualified

=== Manitoba ===
The Manitoba representative will be determined through the MSA 2009 Senior Provincial Championship. This cup competition will take place in August as the team entry's are due 4 August 2009. Watch for teams in the Manitoba Major Soccer League to be entered. Seeding is determined by 15 July 2009.

Hellas SC of Manitoba qualified after a 1-0 extra time win over Lucania.

=== Ontario ===
The Ontario representative is determined by the Ontario Cup. This is a single knock-out tournament with the finals scheduled for 20-Sep-2009 at 8:00pm at the Soccer Centre in Vaughan. This year's event features 62 teams entering the bracket at various levels determined by geography. Before the First round is a Preliminary round and an Extra Preliminary round for some regions.

The final match saw a repeat of 2008 between London AEK and Real Toronto.

Extra Round; 10 May 2009	Preliminary Round 7; 24 May 2009
	Hamilton Boca Juniors	0
	Hamilton Glasgow United	3

Extra Round; 10 May 2009	Preliminary Round 8; 24 May 2009
	Barrie Spirit	2
	Richmond Hill Raiders Madrid FC	1

Extra Round; 10 May 2009		Preliminary Round 15; 24 May 2009
		Mississauga Portofino	2
Alliston Arsenal	0	Cambridge Aurora Lodge	1
Cambridge Aurora Lodge	2

Extra Round; 10 May 2009	Preliminary Round 16; 24 May 2009
	Toronto FC Hitmen	0
	Malton Steeda Bulls	4

Extra Round; 10 May 2009	Preliminary Round 23; 24 May 2009
	Brampton Ebony Jrs	0 (2)
	Toronto Blues FC	0 (4)

Extra Round; 10 May 2009	Preliminary Round 24; 24 May 2009
	Toronto Blackstar FC	2
	Brantford Vicano	4

Extra Round; 10 May 2009		Preliminary Round 31; 24 May 2009
		Kitchener Al's Motors	1
Welland Youngs Insurance	2	Welland Youngs Insurance	2
Erin Mills Eagles	0

Extra Round; 10 May 2009	Preliminary Round 32; 24 May 2009
	Kitchener Hrvat	5
	Brampton United FC	0

Extra Round; 10 May 2009	Preliminary Round 35; 24 May 2009
	London/St.Thomas Croatia	3
	Tecumseh Warriors	0

Extra Round; 10 May 2009	Preliminary Round 39; 24 May 2009
	Sonny's Waterloo FC	2
	Weston Wolves	3

Extra Round; 10 May 2009	Preliminary Round 40; 24 May 2009
	East Hamilton 76	2
	Real Toronto	9

Extra Round; 10 May 2009		Preliminary Round 59; 24 May 2009
		Toronto Peniche	4
Niagara Falls Club Italia Juventus	3	Niagara Falls Club Italia Juventus	1
Toronto Celtic	0

Extra Round; 10 May 2009	Preliminary Round 60; 24 May 2009
	Woodbridge Veneto Lions	0
	Aurora Hearts	1

==== Ontario Cup proper ====
First Round; 7 June 2009
bye
bye
bye
bye
bye
bye
Hamilton Glasgow United	2
Barrie Spirit	0
bye
bye
Ottawa Capital United Premier	1
Ottawa Royals	0
bye
bye
Mississauga Portofino	1 (2)
Malton Steeda Bulls	1 (4)
bye
bye
bye
bye
bye
bye
Toronto Blues FC	3
Brantford Vicano	2
London Portuguese	3
Windsor Caboto F.C.	0
London Marconi	3
London Benfica	3 (pk)
bye
bye
Welland Youngs Insurance	1
Kitchener Hvart	4
HNSC Croatia Windsor	2
St. Thomas "A"	0
London/St.Thomas Croatia	3
Strathroy Portuguese	0
bye
bye
Weston Wolves	3
Real Toronto	6
bye
bye
bye
bye
Sarnia Fury	3
London White Eagles	0
Windsor A.E. United	0
Windsor Hellenic	8
bye
bye
bye
bye
Ottawa South United	5
Ottawa Rockers	4
Ottawa St. Anthony Italia	2
Ottawa Eagles	0
bye
bye
Toronto Peniche	1
Aurora Hearts	0
bye
bye
bye
bye

Second Round; 21 June 2009
Sudbury Croatia Adria	2 (3)
Sudbury Panhellenic	2 (2)
Hamilton Serbians	0 (4)
Hamilton Glasgow United	0 (3)
Scarboro Azzurri	2
Ottawa Capital United Premier	0
Scarborough Ulster Thistle	9
Malton Steeda Bulls	0
Caledon Celtic	1
A.E.K. London FC	2
Brampton Boavista FC	1 (2)
Toronto Blues FC	1 (4)
London Portuguese	1
London Benfica	0
Oakville Italia	3 (2)
Kitchener Hvart	3 (4)
HNSC Croatia Windsor	1 *
London/St.Thomas Croatia	1
Scarborough G.S. United	1
Real Toronto	2
Oakville Wisla United	4
Peterborough City	2
Sarnia Fury	1
Windsor Hellenic	4
Mississauga A.C. Soccer Diavoli	4
Vaughan Shooters	0
Ottawa South United	0
Ottawa St. Anthony Italia	6
Croatia Hamilton	2
Toronto Peniche	1
bye
bye

Third Round; 5 July 2009
Sudbury Croatia Adria	1
Hamilton Serbians	4
Scarboro Azzurri	2
Scarborough Ulster Thistle	4
A.E.K. London FC	10
Toronto Blues FC	0
London Portuguese	1
Kitchener Hvart	0
HNSC Croatia Windsor	3
Real Toronto	6
Oakville Wisla United	3
Windsor Hellenic	1
Mississauga A.C. Soccer Diavoli	1
Ottawa St. Anthony Italia	2
Croatia Hamilton	0 *
Thunder Bay Italia Juventus	0

Quarter-finals; 16 August 2009
Hamilton Serbians	2
Scarborough Ulster Thistle	1
A.E.K. London FC	2
London Portuguese	1
Real Toronto	1
Oakville Wisla United	0
Ottawa St. Anthony Italia	1
Croatia Hamilton	4

Semi-finals; Centennial Stadium; Toronto; 30 August 2009
Hamilton Serbians	1
A.E.K. London FC	1 *4-3pk
Real Toronto	4
Croatia Hamilton	1

Final; The Soccer Centre; Vaughan; 20 September 2009
A.E.K. London FC	1
Real Toronto	2

=== Québec ===
The AAA Quebec Cup (aka Coupe du Québec Saputo AAA) is the cup competition that determines the Quebec representative at the Canadian Club Nationals. The first 2 rounds are home and away matches, while the last 3 rounds are single matches. Results Site

First Round; 4/5 June 2009; 4/5 July 2009
Verts de Sherbrooke	4	0	4
FC Trois-Rivières AA	0	1	1
bye
bye

Eighth-finals; 11/12 July 2009; 1/2 August 2009
Verts de Sherbrooke	1	2	3
Corfinium St-Léonard	2	3	5

First Round; 4/5 June 2009; 4/5 July 2009
Chomedey	1	2	3
Longueuil 2	3	3	6
Lachine SC	2	2	4
Casalciprano Anjou AA	1	0	1

Eighth-finals; 11/12 July 2009; 1/2 August 2009
Longueuil 2	1	-	1
Lachine SC	0	-	0

First Round; 4/5 June 2009; 4/5 July 2009
Hull	5	4	9
Cosmos de Granby	1	0	1
bye
bye

Eighth-finals; 11/12 July 2009; 1/2 August 2009
Hull	2	4	6
Dollard Red Star	1	0	1

First Round; 4/5 June 2009; 4/5 July 2009
Rimouski	0	1	1
Casalciprano Anjou	2	2	4
Longueuil 1	1	0	1
Association trifluvienne	3	7	10

Eighth-finals; 11/12 July 2009; 1/2 August 2009
Casalciprano Anjou	1
Association trifluvienne	0

First Round; 4/5 June 2009; 4/5 July 2009
SC Panellinios Montréal	5	6	11
TerreBonne	0	0	0
bye
bye

Eighth-finals; 11/12 July 2009; 1/2 August 2009
SC Panellinios Montréal	3	3	6
Beauport	5	2	7

First Round; 4/5 June 2009; 4/5 July 2009
CS Mont-Royal Outremont	1	0	1
Blainville AA	1	3	4
Rivière-des-Prairies	2	1	3
Lasalle-Lakeshore United	0	3	3

Eighth-finals; 11/12 July 2009; 1/2 August 2009
Blainville AA	1	-	1
Lasalle-Lakeshore United	0	-	0

First Round; 4/5 June 2009; 4/5 July 2009
Drummondville AA	1	6	7
St-Hubert	1	2	3
bye
bye

Eighth-finals; 11/12 July 2009; 1/2 August 2009
Drummondville AA	1	1	2
Vallée-du-Richelieu	1	2	3

First Round; 4/5 June 2009; 4/5 July 2009
FS Salaberry AA	3	1	4
Brossard	0	0	0
Charlesbourg	0	2	2
Celtix du Haut-Richelieu	1	3	4

Eighth-finals; 11/12 July 2009; 1/2 August 2009
FS Salaberry AA	2	-	2
Celtix du Haut-Richelieu	4	-	4

Quarter-finals; 15/16 August 2009
Corfinium St-Léonard	3
Longueuil 2	1
Hull	1
Casalciprano Anjou	2
Beauport	4
Blainville AA	1
Vallée-du-Richelieu	0
Celtix du Haut-Richelieu	3

Semi-finals; 5 September 2009; Quebec City
Corfinium St-Léonard
Casalciprano Anjou
Beauport
Celtix du Haut-Richelieu

Final; 6 September 2009; Quebec City
Beauport

=== New Brunswick ===
Did not send a team in 2008 and so are unranked for 2009. Deadline for teams to register is 15-July-2009.

=== Prince Edward Island ===
The Avondale Islanders are currently the only team competing at a sufficient level to potentially represent PEI.

=== Nova Scotia ===
The winner of the Nova Scotia Soccer League will represent the province at the National Challenge Trophy. This year's competition will include:

- Dartmouth United
- Cape Breton United
- Halifax City S.C.
- Halifax County United Molson Canadian
- Halifax Dunbrack Bremner's
- NS Canada Games
- Scotia
- Valley Kings Arms

standings as of 22-July-2009

Team	Pld	W	D	L	GF	GA	GD	Pts
Halifax Dunbrack	10	10	0	0	36	4	+32	30
Halifax City	10	5	3	2	18	11	+7	18
Valley Kings Arms	10	5	2	3	14	14	0	17
Scotia	10	4	1	5	17	17	0	13
NS Canada Games*	10	3	2	5	17	17	0	11
Cape Breton United	10	2	3	5	11	22	−11	9
Halifax County United Molson Canadian	10	2	2	6	16	23	−7	8
Dartmouth United	10	2	1	7	10	31	−21	7

=== Newfoundland Labrador ===
2009 Newfoundland and Labrador Challenge Cup

=== Yukon ===
Selects Team
