= 2016 Challenge Trophy =

2016 Canada Soccer National Championships
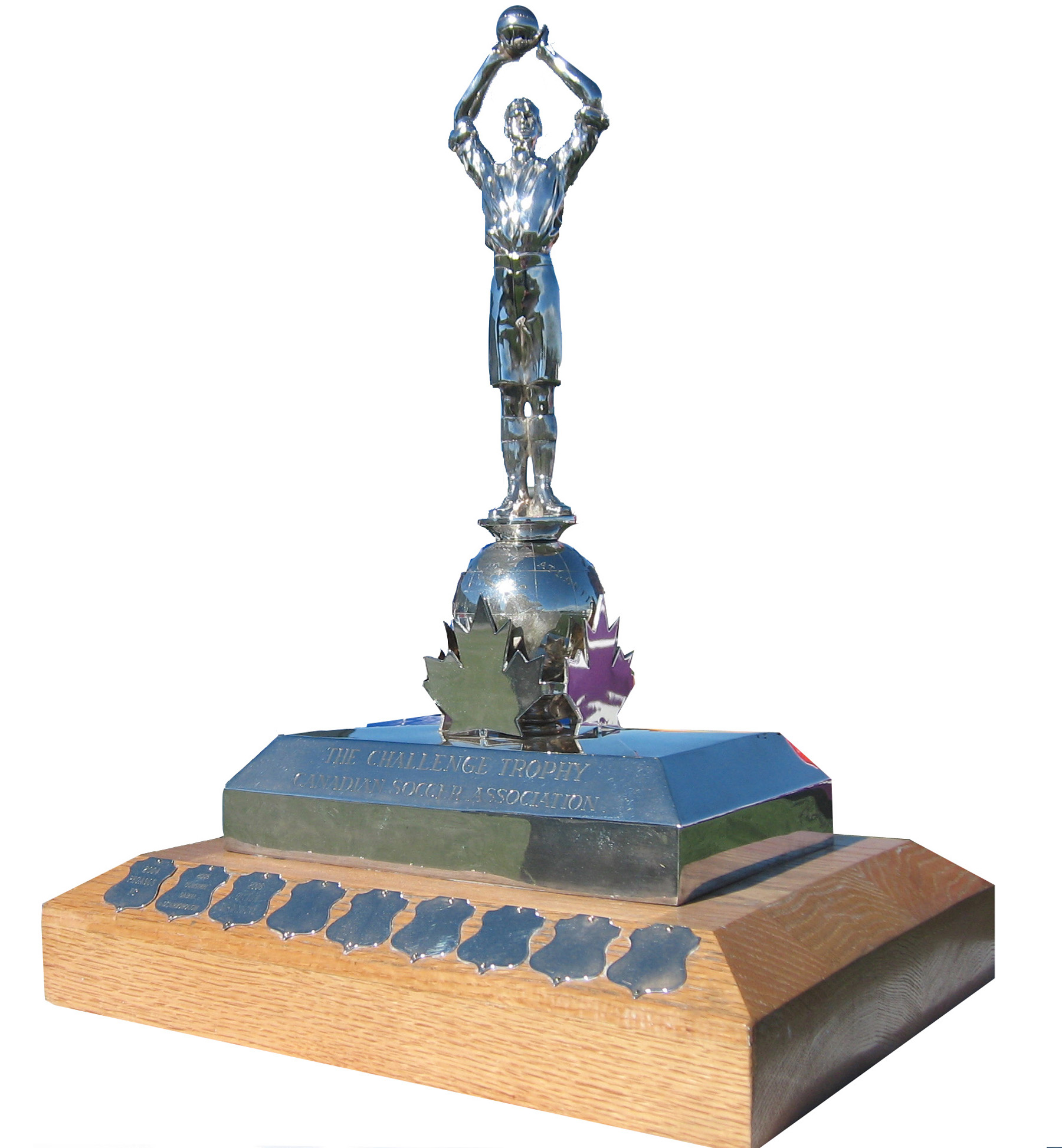
- The Challenge Trophy

Tournament details
- Country: Canada
- Dates: 5-10 October 2016
- Teams: 12

Final positions
- Champions: Edmonton Scottish (1st title)
- Runners-up: Royal-Sélect de Beauport

Tournament statistics
- Matches played: 30
- Goals scored: 93 (3.1 per match)

Awards
- Best player: MVP Paul Hamilton

The 2016 Canada Soccer National Championships (officially the Sport Chek National Championships for sponsorship reasons) was the 94th staging of Canada Soccer's amateur football club competition. Edmonton Scottish won the Challenge Trophy after they beat Royal-Sélect de Beauport in the Canadian Final at the King George V Park in St. John's on 10 October 2016.

Twelve teams qualified to the final week of the 2016 National Championships in St. John's. In the Semifinals, Edmonton Scottish SC beat Saskatoon HUSA Alumni while Royal-Sélect Beauport beat Gloucester Celtic FC.

On the road to the National Championships, Edmonton Scottish beat Edmonton Green & Gold in the Alberta Cup Final.

== Teams ==
Twelve teams were granted entry into the competition; one from each Canadian province. In addition, as the host province, Newfoundland and Labrador was granted a second entry into the competition, while Alberta was also granted a second entry after the withdrawal of the Northwest Territories.

Teams are selected by their provincial soccer associations; most often qualifying by winning provincial leagues or cup championships such as the Ontario Cup.

Province	Team	Manager	Qualification
British Columbia	Surrey Pegasus FC	Paul Bahia	British Columbia Men's Provincial Cup
Alberta	Edmonton Scottish	Kevin Poissant	Alberta Soccer Provincial Championships
Alberta	Edmonton Green & Gold	Martin Andersen	Alberta Soccer Provincial Championships
Saskatchewan	Saskatoon HUSA Alumni	Stewart Gillott	Saskatchewan Shield
Manitoba	FC Winnipeg Lions	Tony Nocita	Manitoba Soccer Association Cup
Ontario	Gloucester Celtic	Matt Williams	Ontario Cup
Quebec	Royal-Sélect de Beauport	Samir Ghrib	Ligue de soccer élite du Québec Playoff Champion
New Brunswick	Fredericton Picaroons Reds	Dave Rouse	New Brunswick Premier Soccer League
Nova Scotia	Western Halifax FC	Alan Jazic	Nova Scotia Soccer League Premiership Cup
Prince Edward Island	PEI FC	John Diamond & Bruce Norton	Acclaimed
Newfoundland and Labrador	St. Lawrence Laurentians	Derek Strang	Newfoundland and Labrador Challenge Cup
Newfoundland and Labrador	Mount Pearl	Andrew Murphy	Newfoundland and Labrador Challenge Cup

== Venues ==
King George V Park in St. John's served as the tournament's main venue, with Topsail Field in Conception Bay South and the Mount Pearl Soccer Complex in Mount Pearl serving as secondary venues. The Feildian Grounds in St. John's and Diane Whelan Soccer Complex in Paradise hosted some consolation round games.

== Group stage ==
The twelve teams in the competition are divided into four groups of three teams each, which then play a single-game round-robin format. The top two teams from each group advance to the knockout round, while the third-placed team enters a relegation tournament.

=== Group A ===
Pos	Team	Pld	W	D	L	GF	GA	GD	Pts	Qualification	Ontario	Manitoba	Prince Edward Island
1	(Ontario) Gloucester Celtic	2	2	0	0	8	1	+7	6	Advance to knockout round	—	4–0	4–1
2	(Manitoba) FC Winnipeg Lions	2	1	0	1	3	5	−2	3	Advance to knockout round	—	—	—
3	(Prince Edward Island) PEI FC	2	0	0	2	2	7	−5	0	Classification tournament	—	1–3	—

Source: canadasoccer.com

=== Group B ===
Pos	Team	Pld	W	D	L	GF	GA	GD	Pts	Qualification	Alberta	New Brunswick	Nova Scotia
1	(Alberta) Edmonton Scottish	2	2	0	0	4	0	+4	6	Advance to knockout round	—	3–0	1–0
2	(New Brunswick) Fredericton Picaroons Reds	2	1	0	1	1	3	−2	3	Advance to knockout round	—	—	1–0
3	(Nova Scotia) Western Halifax FC	2	0	0	2	0	2	−2	0	Classification tournament	—	—	—

Source: canadasoccer.com

=== Group C ===
Pos	Team	Pld	W	D	L	GF	GA	GD	Pts	Qualification	Quebec	Alberta	British Columbia
1	(Quebec) Royal-Sélect de Beauport	2	1	1	0	1	0	+1	4	Advance to knockout round	—	0–0	—
2	(Alberta) Edmonton Green and Gold	2	0	2	0	0	0	0	2	Advance to knockout round	—	—	—
3	(British Columbia) Surrey Pegasus FC	2	0	1	1	0	1	−1	1	Classification tournament	0–1	0–0	—

Source: canadasoccer.com

=== Group D ===
Pos	Team	Pld	W	D	L	GF	GA	GD	Pts	Qualification	Saskatchewan	Newfoundland and Labrador	Newfoundland and Labrador
1	(Saskatchewan) Saskatoon HUSA Alumni	2	2	0	0	2	0	+2	6	Advance to knockout round	—	1–0	1–0
2	(Newfoundland and Labrador) St. Lawrence Laurentians	2	1	0	1	1	1	0	3	Advance to knockout round	—	—	1–0
3	(Newfoundland and Labrador) Mount Pearl	2	0	0	2	0	2	−2	0	Classification tournament	—	—	—

Source: canadasoccer.com

== Classification tournament ==
Third-placed teams from the group stage are entered into the classification tournament to determine overall rankings at the end of the tournament.

Pos	Team	Pld	W	D	L	GF	GA	GD	Pts	British Columbia	Prince Edward Island	Newfoundland and Labrador	Nova Scotia
1	(British Columbia) Surrey Pegasus FC	3	2	0	1	9	5	+4	6	—		2–3	
2	(Prince Edward Island) PEI FC	3	1	1	1	5	6	−1	4	1–3	—	1–1	3–2
3	(Newfoundland and Labrador) Mount Pearl	3	1	1	1	4	7	−3	4			—	
4	(Nova Scotia) Western Halifax FC	3	1	0	2	7	7	0	3	1–4		4–0	—

Source: canadasoccer.com
Rules for classification: 1) points; 2) head-to-head; 3) goal differential

== Knockout round ==
Teams placed first and second from each group in the group stage advance to the knockout round. All teams play three matches, as teams that lose in the knockout round still advance to face other losing teams to determine final classifications for 3rd through 8th place.

Fifth place
2D	St. Lawrence Laurentians	2
2C	Edmonton Green and Gold	4
Seventh place
2B	Fredericton Picaroons Reds	1
2A	FC Winnipeg Lions	5

Consolation playoffs
2D	St. Lawrence Laurentians	2
2B	Fredericton Picaroons Reds	1
2A	FC Winnipeg Lions	2
2C	Edmonton Green and Gold	3

Quarterfinals
1A	Gloucester Celtic	6
2D	St. Lawrence Laurentians	1
1C	Royal-Sélect de Beauport (p)	1 (5)
2B	Fredericton Picaroons Reds	1 (4)
1D	Saskatoon HUSA Alumni	3
2A	FC Winnipeg Lions	1
1B	Edmonton Scottish	2
2C	Edmonton Green and Gold	0

Semifinals
1A	Gloucester Celtic	0
1C	Royal-Sélect de Beauport	1
1D	Saskatoon HUSA Alumni	0
1B	Edmonton Scottish	2

Final
1C	Royal-Sélect de Beauport	0
1B	Edmonton Scottish	1
Third place
1A	Gloucester Celtic	5
1D	Saskatoon HUSA Alumni	2

=== Quarter-finals ===
October 8, 2016 Quarterfinal	Gloucester Celtic (Ontario)	6–1	(Newfoundland and Labrador) St. Lawrence Laurentians	King George V Stadium
12:00 pm	Evraire; Kewin; De Couvreur; Lauzon	Report	Pittman

October 8, 2016 Quarter-final	Royal-Sélect de Beauport (Quebec)	1–1 (a.e.t.) (5–4 p)	(New Brunswick) Fredericton Picaroons Reds	Topsail Field
12:00 pm	Papa Dione	Report; Report	Morrison

October 8, 2016 Quarter-final	Saskatoon HUSA Alumni (Saskatchewan)	3–1	(Manitoba) FC Winnipeg Lions	Mt. Pearl Soccer Complex
2:30 pm	Peters; Tomchuk	Report	Alberti

October 8, 2016 Quarter-final	Edmonton Scottish (Alberta)	2–0	(Alberta) Edmonton Green and Gold	Mt. Pearl Soccer Complex
5:00 pm		Report

=== Semi-finals ===
October 9, 2016 Semi-final	Gloucester Celtic (Ontario)	0–1	(Quebec) Royal-Sélect de Beauport	King George V Stadium
9:30 am		Report	Grant-Gignac

October 9, 2016 Semi-final	Saskatoon HUSA Alumni (Saskatchewan)	0–2	(Alberta) Edmonton Scottish	King George V Stadium
12:00 pm		Report	Gazic; Johnstone

October 9, 2016 Consolation play-off	St. Lawrence Laurentians (Newfoundland and Labrador)	2–1	(New Brunswick) Fredericton Picaroons Reds	Mt. Pearl Soccer Complex
2:30 pm	J. Slaney; Hennebury	Report	K. Morrison

October 9, 2016 Consolation play-off	FC Winnipeg Lions (Manitoba)	2–3	(Alberta) Edmonton Green and Gold	Mt. Pearl Soccer Complex
12:00 pm	Alberti; Rattai	Report	Graham; Ongaro; Barker-Rothschild

=== Final ===
October 10, 2016 (gold) 1st place match	Royal-Sélect de Beauport (Quebec)	0–1	(Alberta) Edmonton Scottish	King George V Stadium
12:00 pm		Report	Wheeler 93'

October 10, 2016 (bronze) 3rd place match	Gloucester Celtic (Ontario)	5–2	(Saskatchewan) Saskatoon HUSA Alumni	Mt. Pearl Soccer Complex
11:15 am	De Couvreur; El-Asmar; Murphy; Babineau; Caceros	Report	Mylymok; Reis

October 10, 2016 5th place match	St. Lawrence Laurentians (Newfoundland and Labrador)	2–4	(Alberta) Edmonton Green and Gold	Mt. Pearl Soccer Complex
8:30 am	Gregory; Slaney	Report	Graham; Hersche; Ongaro; Shah

October 10, 2016 7th place match	Fredericton Picaroons Reds (New Brunswick)	1–5	(Manitoba) FC Winnipeg Lions	Paradise Field
11:15 am	K. Morrison	Report	Alberti; Naumiuk; Kumagai

== Tournament ranking ==
Rank	Team
1st place, gold medalist(s)	(Alberta) Edmonton Scottish
2nd place, silver medalist(s)	(Quebec) Royal-Sélect de Beauport
3rd place, bronze medalist(s)	(Ontario) Gloucester Celtic
4	(Saskatchewan) Saskatoon HUSA Alumni
5	(Alberta) Edmonton Green and Gold
6	(Newfoundland and Labrador) St. Lawrence Laurentians
7	(Manitoba) FC Winnipeg Lions
8	(New Brunswick) Fredericton Picaroons Reds
9	(British Columbia) Surrey Pegasus FC
10	(Prince Edward Island) PEI FC
11	(Newfoundland and Labrador) Mount Pearl
12	(Nova Scotia) Western Halifax FC
