= 2008 Canadian National Challenge Cup =

2008 Canada Soccer National Championships
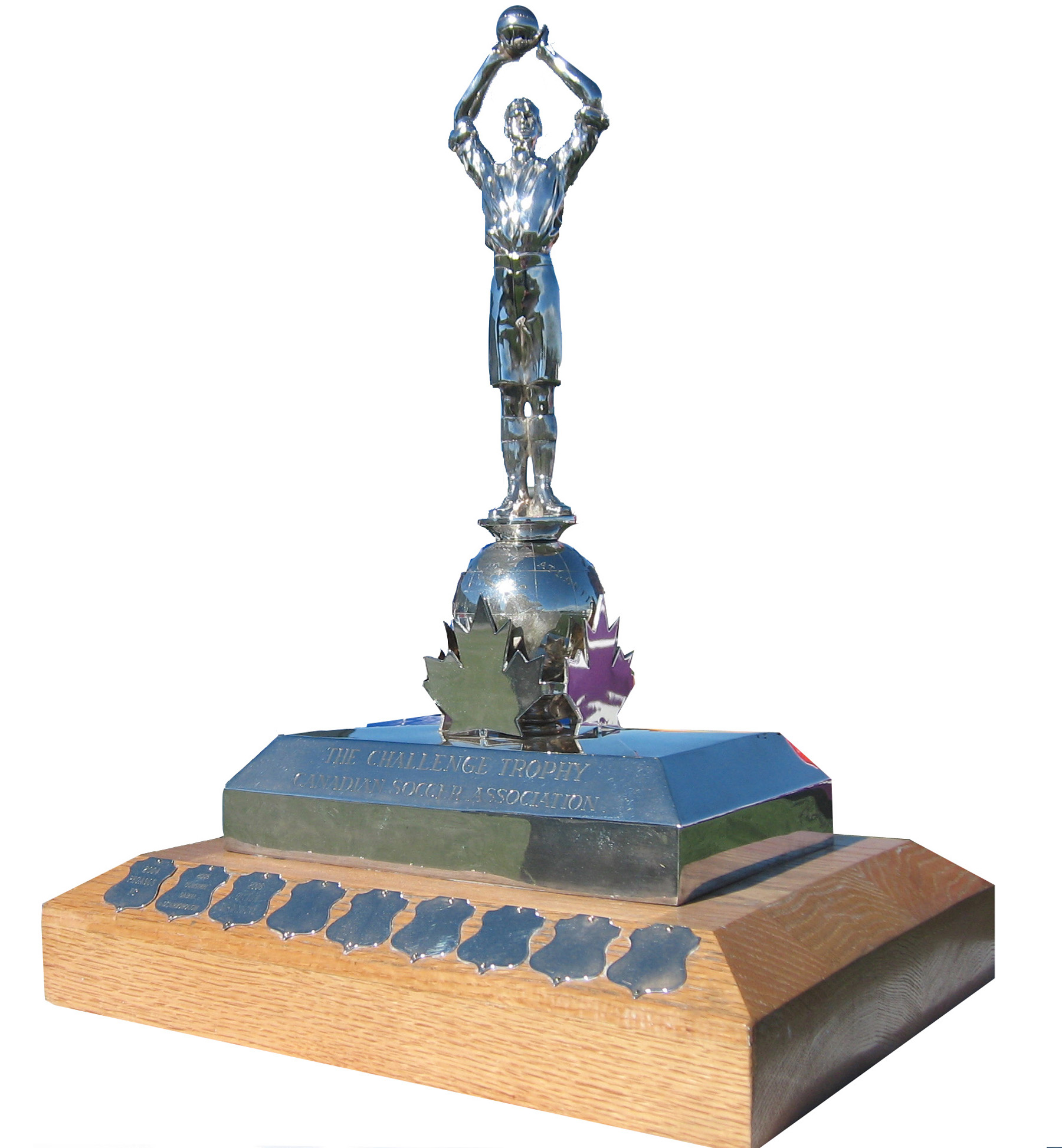
- The Challenge Trophy

Tournament details
- Country: Canada

Final positions
- Champions: Calgary Callies (4th title)
- Runners-up: Corfinium St-Léonard

The 2008 Canada Soccer National Championships (officially the BMO National Championships for sponsorship reasons) was the 86th staging of Canada Soccer's domestic football club competition. Calgary Callies won the Challenge Trophy after they beat Corfinium St-Léonard in the Canadian Final at King George V Park in St. John's on 13 October 2008.

Ten teams qualified to the final week of the 2008 National Championships in St. John's. Each team played four group matches before the medal and ranking matches on the last day.

On the road to the National Championships, Calgary Callies beat Edmonton Green & Gold in the 208 Alberta Cup Final.

== Teams ==
Each province determined their representative in different methods (league or cup). The seeding based on last years performance are:

1. AB - Calgary Callies
2. BC - Gorge FC
3. NL - St. Lawrence Laurentians
4. NS - Halifax City Colwell Bankers
5. MB - SC Hellas
6. ON - Real Toronto
7. QC - Corfinium de St-Leonard
8. PE - Avondale Islanders
9. SK - Yorkton United
10. NL (host) - Feildians Ernst & Young Orenda

== Qualification ==
The following is a list of clubs, by province, that have entered their own provincial competition.

=== British Columbia ===
Winners of the Senior A Cup will represent BC at the National Championships. The 2008 Cup will be hosted in the Fraser Valley May 9 and 10.

- Gorge FC

20 teams entered the competition so a 4-game preliminary round was required.

Preliminary Round:
Indo vs Surrey U (0:2)
Inter vs Vantreights (4:0)
Columbus v FVSL #5
Croatia v Firemen (3:2)

Round 1 (12/13 April 2008)
UBC
Chilliwack
Langley	? (adv on PKs)
Surrey U	?
Gorge	4
Bays United	1
Poco	2 (AET)
Inter	1
Sporting
Gordon Head
West Van	? (adv on PKs)
Columbus	?
PAU	? (adv. 5-4 PKs)
Sooke Celtic	?
MetroFord	2
Croatia	1

Quarter-finals (19/20 April 2008)
UBC
Langley
Gorge
Poco
Sporting
West Van
PAU
MetroFord

Semi-finals (26/27 April 2008)
Gorge FC	3
UBC	0
Sporting Club	3
Peach Arch	1

Finals (10 May 2008 - Hosted by Fraser Valley Soccer League)
Gorge FC	1
Sporting Club	0

=== Alberta ===
The ASA hosts a Senior Men's Challenge Trophy from Aug. 29 to Sept. 1 in Calgary. Winner goes to Nationals. The Alberta Major Soccer League teams are:

- Calgary Callies FC
- Calgary Dinos Major
- Calgary Villains Elite FC
- Lethbridge FC
- Red Deer Renegades
- Edmonton Drillers
- Edmonton Green and Gold
- Edmonton Scottish
- Edmonton Victoria
- Edmonton KC Trojans

=== Manitoba ===
The MSA Cup 2008 determines the Manitoba representative to the National Challenge Trophy. The cup is an FA Cup styled tournament running from May 31 to August 23, 2008. Various teams enter at various levels and each round to drawn (not a static bracket). Round 5 is to be drawn on 13 July 2008. Teams to watch for include:

- Hellas
- Lucania SC
- Sons of Italy Lions SC

Round 5 (Jul 31 to Aug 02)

Quarter-finals (5-August, 2008)
Lucania	0
Hellas S.C.	1
Sons of Italy	2
Maples Juventus	0
Lusitania	3
Ragnarok	2
United Weston	2
Blue Blazers	1

Semi-finals (20 August 2008)
Hellas S.C.	2
Sons of Italy	1
Lusitania	3
United Weston	0

Finals (23 August 2008)
Hellas S.C.	0*
Lusitania	0

Hellas S.C. advance 3-0 on penalty kicks.

=== Nova Scotia ===
The rep is determined through the Nova Scotia Soccer League. This league has teams from PEI and NB but the rep will be the top NS team.

- Halifax City
- Halifax Dunbrack
- Halifax County
- Cape Breton United
- Valley Kings Arms
- Dartmouth United
- Scotia
- Highland

=== Ontario ===
The rep is determined through the Ontario Cup. About 60 teams are entered in 2008. The final 16 teams are detailed below. Real Toronto wins the title however the result was reversed when a player eligibility infraction occurred.

Third Round (6-Jul-2008)
Ottawa St. Anthony Premier	5
Etobicoke Canadiens	1
Scarborough Ulster Thistle	3
Cambridge PCC Supersonics	2
Oakville Wisla United	0
London AEK	4
Croatia Hamilton	4
Peniche CC Toronto	0
London Portuguese Club	0
Niagara Club Italia Juventus	1
Oakville Italia	0
Hamilton Serbians	3
Thunder Bay Italia Juventus	0
Real Toronto	5
Woodbridge Italia	1
Windsor Hellenic	2

Quarter-finals (10-Aug-2008)
Ottawa St. Anthony Premier
Scarborough Ulster Thistle
London AEK
Croatia Hamilton
Niagara Club Italia Juventus
Hamilton Serbians
Real Toronto
Windsor Hellenic

Semi-finals (24-Aug-2008, Hershey Centre)

Final (14-Sep-2008, The Soccer Centre)
London AEK	1
Real Toronto	2

=== Newfoundland ===
The rep will be determined from a final cup competition after a league season. The final weekend will be held Labour Day weekend at the King George V Park in St. John's. The Molson Challenge Cup 2008 will be contested by the following teams:

- St. Lawrence Laurentians (defending champion)
- Mount Pearl
- Holy Cross FC
- Feildians
- St. John's U18s (exhibition team)

The St. Lawrence Laurentians defeated Feildians on the final weekend. Approximately 2500 fans were in attendance.

== Final competition ==
- "Official Site". Canada Soccer. Archived from the original on May 23, 2008.
- Host Site

=== Round robin ===
The teams will be split into 2 groups of 5 teams each. After round robin, seeding matches will take place (A1vB1, A2vB2, etc.) New Brunswick dropped out so a second team from the host Newfoundland was entered.

Group A
Pos	Team	Pld	W	T	L	GF	GA	GD	Pts
1	(Alberta) Calgary Callies	4	4	0	0	11	5	+6	12
2	(Nova Scotia) Halifax City Coldwell Banker	4	2	1	1	8	6	+2	7
3	(Prince Edward Island) Avondale Islanders	4	2	1	1	8	6	+2	7
4	(Manitoba) SC Hellas	4	0	1	3	4	9	−5	1
5	(Saskatchewan) Yorkton United	4	0	1	3	3	8	−5	1

Group B
Pos	Team	Pld	W	T	L	GF	GA	GD	Pts
1	(Quebec) Corfinium de St-Leonard	4	3	1	0	6	2	+4	10
2	(British Columbia) Gorge FC	4	1	2	1	5	3	+2	5
3	(Ontario) AEK London	4	1	2	1	3	3	0	5
4	(Newfoundland and Labrador) St. Lawrence Laurentians	4	1	1	2	3	6	−3	5
5	(Newfoundland and Labrador) Feildians	4	1	0	3	2	5	−3	3

=== Play-offs ===
13-October-2008
08:30 (UTC-2:30)

Yorkton United	2-1	Feildians

Topsail Field

13-October-2008
08:30 (UTC-2:30)

SC Hellas	3-5	St. Lawrence Laurentians

Middle Smallwood

13-October-2008
11:00 (UTC-2:30)

Halifax City Coldwell Banker	0-3	AEK London

Upper Smallwood

13-October-2008
08:00 (UTC-2:30)

Avondale Islanders	3-2	Gorge FC
Paul Craig 1' 28'; Morgan DesRoches 74'	CSA Report	Patrick Gawrys; Russell Anderson

King George V Park

13-October-2008
13:00 (UTC-2:30)

(Alberta) Calgary Callies	3-1	Corfinium de St-Leonard (Quebec)
Nicky Reyes; Mark Slade; Steffen Holdt 12'	CSA Report; The Telegram; CSA News	Likenson Chery 71'

King George V Park
Attendance: 3,000

=== Top goal scorers ===
Goals	Games	Team	Player
6	5	Avondale Islanders	Paul Craig
4	5	Halifax City	Kristin Kirincich
4	5	Yorkton United	Waelical Sven
