= 2010 Challenge Trophy =

2010 Canada Soccer National Championships
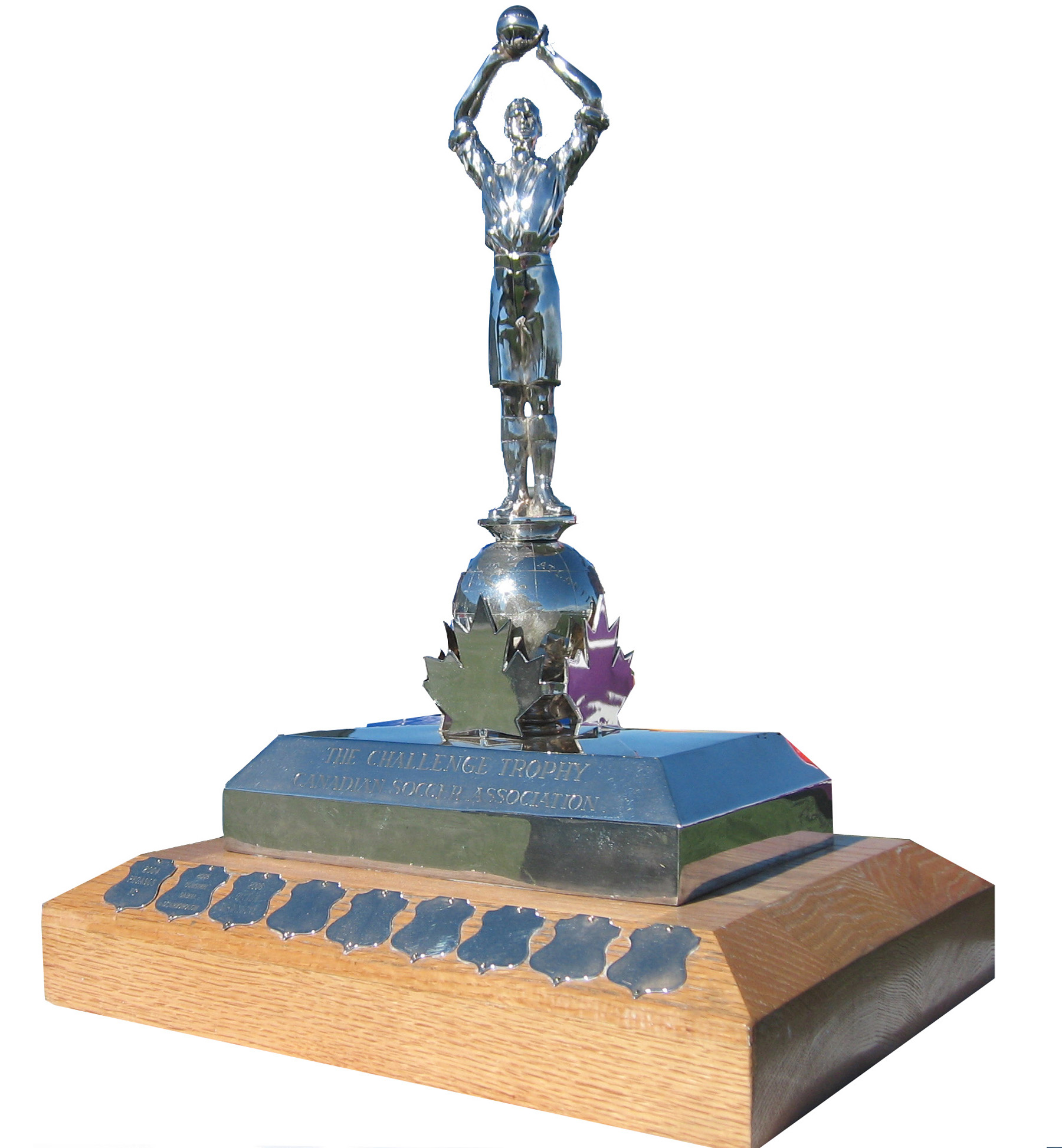
- The Challenge Trophy

Tournament details
- Country: Canada

Final positions
- Champions: PEI FC (Avondale Islanders) (1st title)
- Runners-up: Victoria Gorge FC

The 2010 Canada Soccer National Championships (officially the BMO National Championships for sponsorship reasons) was the 88th staging of Canada Soccer's amateur football club competition. PEI FC (Avondale Islanders) won the Challenge Trophy after they beat Victoria Gorge FC in the Canadian Final at UPEI Field in Charlottetown on 11 October 2010.

Ten teams qualified to the final week of the 2010 National Championships in Charlottetown. Each team played four group matches before the medal and ranking matches on the last day.

On the road to the National Championships, PEI FC beat PEI Selects (Charlottetown Abbies SC) in the 2010 PEI Final.

Defending champion Hellas SC of Manitoba failed to qualify as they lost to Lucania SC in the semi-final round in the Manitoba play down.

== Seeding ==
The seeding is based on the results from the previous year. New Brunswick did not send a team this year, so the host gained a second entry.

1. Manitoba
2. Quebec
3. Prince Edward Island
4. Alberta
5. British Columbia
6. Newfoundland Labrador
7. Nova Scotia
8. Saskatchewan
9. Ontario
10. Prince Edward Island 2 (Guest team)

== Teams ==
Group 1
1. (Manitoba) Winnipeg Lucania FC
4. (Alberta) Calgary Dinosaurs
5. (British Columbia) Victoria Gorge FC
8. (Saskatchewan) Huskie Alumni
9. (Ontario) AEK London FC

Group 2
2. (Quebec) Royal Select de Beauport
3. (Prince Edward Island) 1 Churchill Arms
6. (Newfoundland and Labrador) Holy Cross Kirby
7. (Nova Scotia) Halifax Dunbrack
10. (Prince Edward Island) 2 PEI Selects

- tba (ON) Final scheduled for 19-Sep-2010 Official Site
- tba (NL) There are six team playing for the right to represent NL – Holy Cross, St. Lawrence Laurentians, Mt. Pearl, Feildians, CB Auto Strikers FC, Western United FC.

== Schedule and results ==
6 October 2010	Calgary Dinosaurs (Alberta)	0-2	(British Columbia) Victoria Gorge FC	Charlottetown, PE
09:30			Jamie Merriman; Kallen Holden

6 October 2010	Winnipeg Lucania FC (Manitoba)	0-1	(Saskatchewan) Huskie United Alumni	Charlottetown, PE
12:30			David Patterson	Stadium: UPEI; Referee: Dave Gantar

6 October 2010	Churchill Arms (Prince Edward Island) 1	2-0	(Newfoundland and Labrador) Holy Cross Kirby	Charlottetown, PE
19:00	Michel Daoust-Wheatley			Stadium: UPEI; Referee: Geoff Gamble

6 October 2010	Royal Select de Beauport (Quebec)	0-2	(Nova Scotia) Halifax Dunbrack	Charlottetown, PE
16:00			Jonattan Cordoba; Ryan Devereaux	Stadium: UPEI; Referee: N. Rewuski

7 October 2010	Winnipeg Lucania FC (Manitoba)	0-0	(Ontario) AEK London FC	Charlottetown, PE
12:00				Stadium: UPEI

7 October 2010	Calgary Dinosaurs (Alberta)	0-0	(Saskatchewan) Huskie United Alumni	Charlottetown, PE
09:30

7 October 2010	Royal Select de Beauport (Quebec)	4-1	(Prince Edward Island) 2 PEI Selects	Charlottetown, PE
14:30	Said Bouajila Cedric Essockamba Augustin Manga-Iko	CSA Report	Rob Diamond	Stadium: UPEI

7 October 2010	Churchill Arms (Prince Edward Island) 1	1-0	(Nova Scotia) Halifax Dunbrack	Charlottetown, PE
19:30	Brett Norton

8 October 2010	Winnipeg Lucania FC (Manitoba)	0-1	(Alberta) Calgary Dinosaurs	Charlottetown, PE
12:00

8 October 2010	Victoria Gorge FC (British Columbia)	1-1	(Ontario) AEK London FC	Charlottetown, PE
10:30

8 October 2010	Royal Select Beauport (Quebec)	0-0	(Prince Edward Island) 1 Churchill Arms	Charlottetown, PE
19:30

8 October 2010	(Newfoundland and Labrador) Holy Cross Kirby	1-1	(Prince Edward Island) 2 PEI Selects	Charlottetown, PE
14:30

9 October 2010	Winnipeg Lucania FC (Manitoba)	1-2	(British Columbia) Victoria Gorge FC	Charlottetown, PE
9:30

9 October 2010	Huskie United Alumni (Saskatchewan)	1-2	(Ontario) AEK London FC	Charlottetown, PE
12:00

9 October 2010	Royal Select de Beauport (Quebec)	2-1	(Newfoundland and Labrador) Holy Cross Kirby	Charlottetown, PE
15:00

9 October 2010	Halifax Dunbrack (Nova Scotia)	2-1	(Prince Edward Island) 2 PEI Selects	Charlottetown, PE
12:00

10 October 2010	Calgary Dinosaurs (Alberta)	2-2	(Ontario) AEK London FC	Charlottetown, PE
11:30				Stadium: Cornwall Fields

10 October 2010	Victoria Gorge FC (British Columbia)	1-0	(Saskatchewan) Huskie United Alumni	Charlottetown, PE
09:30				Stadium: Cornwall Fields

10 October 2010	Churchill Arms (Prince Edward Island) 1	1-0	(Prince Edward Island) 2 PEI Selects	Charlottetown, PE
17:00				Stadium: UPEI

10 October 2010	Holy Cross Kirby (Newfoundland and Labrador)	0-2	(Nova Scotia) Halifax Dunbrack	Charlottetown, PE
12:00				Stadium: UPEI

11 October 2010 9,10 Game	Winnipeg Lucania FC (Manitoba)	3-1	(Newfoundland and Labrador) Holy Cross Kirby	Stratford, PE
08:00				Stadium: Stratford

11 October 2010 7,8 Game	4th Place Group 1 (Saskatchewan) Huskie United Alumni	5-2	4th Place Group 2 (Prince Edward Island) 2 PEI Selects	Stratford, PE
10:00				Stadium: Stratford

11 October 2010 5,6 Game	3rd Place Group 1 Calgary Dinosaurs (Alberta)	5-4	3rd Place Group 2 Royal Select de Beauport (Quebec)	Stratford, PE
10:00				Stadium: Stratford

11 October 2010 3,4 Game	2nd Place Group 1 (Ontario) AEK London FC	2-3	2nd Place Group 2 (Nova Scotia) Halifax Dunbrack	Cornwall, PE
11:30				Stadium: Cornwall Fields

11 October 2010 1,2 Final	1st Place Group 1 Victoria Gorge FC (British Columbia)	0-2	1st Place Group 2 (Prince Edward Island) 1 Churchill Arms	Charlottetown, PE
11:30		report	Brett Norton; Ryan Anstey	Stadium: UPEI; Referee: Sylvain Petrescu

== Rosters ==
=== Gorge FC ===
In the provincial final, Karpati's squad Note: Flags indicate national team as defined under FIFA eligibility rules; some limited exceptions apply. Players may hold more than one non-FIFA nationality.

No.	Pos.	Nation	Player
—	GK		Joel Galbraith
—	DF		David Gustar
—	DF		Liam Girard
—	DF		Robbie Veenhof
—	DF		Kyle Finner
—	MF		Patrick Gawrys
—	MF		Sean Battistoni
—	MF		Kevin Mennie
—	MF		Will Moore
—	FW		Chad Kalyk
—	FW		Kellen Holden

No.	Pos.	Nation	Player
—			Russell Anderson
—			Zeke Cabell
—			Greg Fiddick
—			Gord Johnson
—			Romaie Martin
—			Jamie Merriman
—			Quinn Van Gylswyk
—			
—			
—			
—			

=== Halifax Dunbrack ===
Note: Flags indicate national team as defined under FIFA eligibility rules; some limited exceptions apply. Players may hold more than one non-FIFA nationality.

No.	Pos.	Nation	Player
21			Kostek Bedoa-Gorski
19	FW		Ryan Devereaux
11	FW		Alexander Devereaux
4	DF		Adam Dowie
—	MF		Chris Haugn
—			Brett Norton
—			Sean Kodejs
—			Danny Worthington
—	DF		Wes Hawley

No.	Pos.	Nation	Player
10	MF		Jonattan Cordoba
22	FW		Alexandera Cordoba
—	DF		Kerry Weymann
—	DF		Danny Leblanc
—	DF		Shawn Kodejs
—	GK		Ben Ur
—	MF		Peter Garonis
—			Billy Connolly
—			

=== PEI Selects ===
Note: Flags indicate national team as defined under FIFA eligibility rules; some limited exceptions apply. Players may hold more than one non-FIFA nationality.

No.	Pos.	Nation	Player
—			
—			
—			
—			
—			
6		CAN	Rob Diamond
—			
—			
—			
—			

No.	Pos.	Nation	Player
—			
—			
—			
—			
15		CAN	
—			
—			
—			
—			
—			

=== Churchill Arms ===
Note: Flags indicate national team as defined under FIFA eligibility rules; some limited exceptions apply. Players may hold more than one non-FIFA nationality.

No.	Pos.	Nation	Player
1	GK	CAN	Matt Lally
2		CAN	Rob Aiken
3			
4		CAN	Graham Ashworth
5			
6		CAN	Jon Vos
—			
8		CAN	Matt Thomas
—			
10		CAN	Ryan Anstey

No.	Pos.	Nation	Player
11			
—			
—			
—			
—			
—			
17		CAN	Dan McAleer
—			
—			
29		CAN	Josh Vessey

== Qualifiers ==
The following are details of each of the provincial finals that will determine each representative. New Brunswick is serving a suspension, so PEI as host will get 2 teams. List of Challenge Trophy 2010 teams

16 May 2010 (British Columbia); BC Cup Final	Gorge FC	2-1	Surrey United Firefighters	Victoria, BC
	14' Sean Battistoni; Kellen Holden	News	Niall Thompson	Stadium: Royal Athletic Park; Attendance: 1000

6-Sep-2010 (Alberta); Mike Traficante Challenge Cup	Edmonton Scottish	v	Calgary Dinosaurs	Edmonton, AB
		Report		Stadium: Edmonton Soccer Complex

(Saskatchewan)	v

28-Aug-2010 (Manitoba); Club Championship	Lucania SC	v	Sons of Italy Lions SC	Winnipeg, MB
				Stadium: Winnipeg Soccer Complex

14-Sep-2010; Ontario Cup	Ottawa Royals or Brampton Ebony Jrs	v	Toronto Blackstar or AEK London

5-Sep-2010 (Quebec) Coupe du Québec Saputo AAA	Royal Select de Beauport	1-0 (AET)	Corfinium St. Leonard	Laval, QC

22-Aug-2010; 25-Aug-2010 (Prince Edward Island) Challenge Series	Avondale Islanders	2-1; 1-0	PEI Selects	Charlottetown, PEI
				Stadium: UPEI Turf

17-Aug-2010 (Nova Scotia) NSSL Playoff Final	Suburban FC	2-2 (pk)	Halifax Dunbrack	Halifax, NS
	Mesut Mert; Ian Greedy		Ryan Devereaux; Jon Cordoba	Stadium: Mainland North Common

5-Sep-2010 (Newfoundland and Labrador) Challenge Cup Provincial Championship	Mount Pearl	1-3	Holy Cross	Burin Peninsula, NL
	Ian Macleod	report news	Aaron Anstey; Matthew Breen; Zack Wade	Stadium: Centennial Field

15-Aug-2010 (New Brunswick) Senior A Championship	Fredericton Picaroons Reds	6-0	Fredericton Wanderers	Fredericton, NB
	Karel Prickett 30' 70'; Calen Smith 44'; Jon Crossland 50' 70+'; Pete Kelly 55'	News	Chris James (gk) (substituted off) 45' - Marcus Hallett (substituted on) 45'	Stadium: Chapman Field

=== General ===
- Challenge Trophy Schedule
- Alberta Qualifier
- News Preview
- News Preview
- Strong start for PEI at soccer nationals
- Dunbrack men open with win at soccer nationals
