= 2007 Canadian National Challenge Cup =

2007 Canada Soccer National Championships
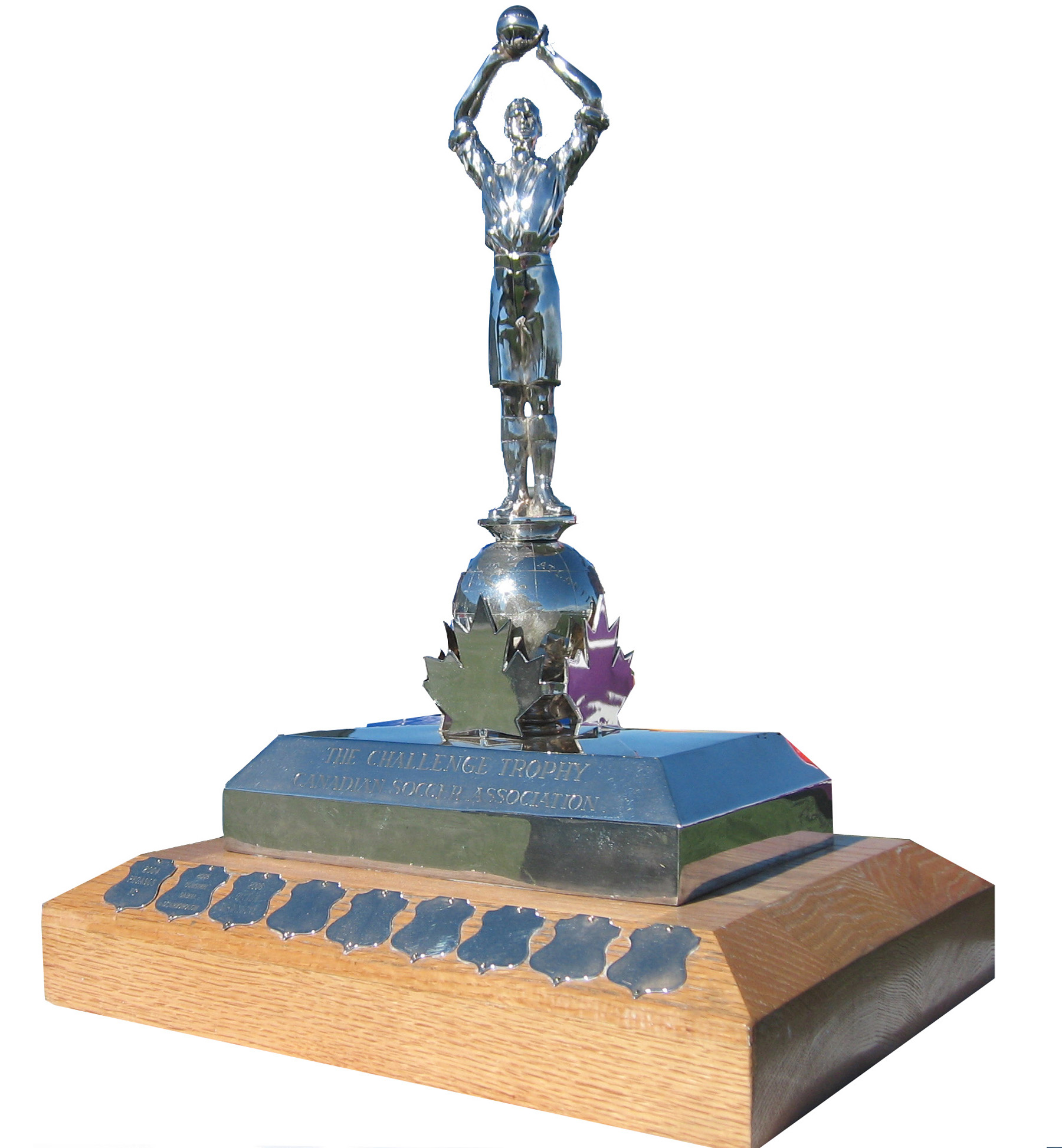
- The Challenge Trophy

Tournament details
- Country: Canada

Final positions
- Champions: Calgary Callies (3rd title)
- Runners-up: Vancouver Columbus FC

The 2007 Canada Soccer National Championships (officially the Hyundai National Championships for sponsorship reasons) was the 85th staging of Canada Soccer's domestic football club competition. Calgary Callies won the Challenge Trophy after they beat Vancouver Columbus FC in the Canadian Final at Mainland Commons in Halifax on 8 October 2007.

Ten teams qualified to the final week of the 2007 National Championships in Halifax. Each team played four group matches before the medal and ranking matches on the last day.

On the road to the National Championships, Calgary Callies beat Calgary Villains Elite in the 2007 Alberta Cup Final.

== Teams/Rosters ==
=== British Columbia: Columbus Clan FC ===
Note: Flags indicate national team as defined under FIFA eligibility rules; some limited exceptions apply. Players may hold more than one non-FIFA nationality.

No.	Pos.	Nation	Player
—			Luca Dalla Pace
—			Jonathan Poli
—			Tony Gaita
—			Frank Lore
—			Nathan Quan
—			Steve Deblasio
—			Gino Gaita
—			Devin Mathews
—			Brendan Stabeno
—			Robbie Cairns

No.	Pos.	Nation	Player
—			Darren Nott
—		CAN	Garret Kusch
—			Tiarnan King
—			Joe Scigliano
—			Carmen D'Onofrio
—			Salvatore Cuccione
—			Craig Richards

- Alberta:Calgary Callies

Note: Flags indicate national team as defined under FIFA eligibility rules; some limited exceptions apply. Players may hold more than one non-FIFA nationality.

No.	Pos.	Nation	Player
—			Dave Harrison
—			Will Langford
—			Jamie MacDonald
—			Brett Colvin
—			Cenek Patik
—			Andre Duberry
—			Nicolas Reyes
—			Jamie Auvigne
—			Mark Slade
—			Steffen Holdt

No.	Pos.	Nation	Player
—			Felix Napuri
—			Liam Da Silva
—			Francisco Miron
—			Johnny Cherkas
—			Stuart Stormonth
—			Youssef Tarraf
—			Milan Timotijevic
—			Eric Roa
—			Chris Kooy
—			Allen Jovica

- Saskatchewan: Yorkton United

Note: Flags indicate national team as defined under FIFA eligibility rules; some limited exceptions apply. Players may hold more than one non-FIFA nationality.

No.	Pos.	Nation	Player
—			
—			
—			
—			
—			
—			
—			
—			
—			
—			

No.	Pos.	Nation	Player
—			
—			
—			
—			
—			
—			
—			
—			
—			
—			

- Manitoba:

Note: Flags indicate national team as defined under FIFA eligibility rules; some limited exceptions apply. Players may hold more than one non-FIFA nationality.

No.	Pos.	Nation	Player
—			
—			
—			
—			
—			
—			
—			
—			
—			
—			

No.	Pos.	Nation	Player
—			
—			
—			
—			
—			
—			
—			
—			
—			
—			

- Ontario: Woodbridge Italia

Note: Flags indicate national team as defined under FIFA eligibility rules; some limited exceptions apply. Players may hold more than one non-FIFA nationality.

No.	Pos.	Nation	Player
—			
—			
—			
—			
—			
—			
—			
—			
—			
—			

No.	Pos.	Nation	Player
—			
—			
—			
—			
—			
—			
—			
—			
—			
—			

- Quebec: SC Panellinios Montréal

Note: Flags indicate national team as defined under FIFA eligibility rules; some limited exceptions apply. Players may hold more than one non-FIFA nationality.

No.	Pos.	Nation	Player
—			
—			
—			
—			
—			
—			
—			
—			
—			
—			

No.	Pos.	Nation	Player
—			
—			
—			
—			
—			
—			
—			
—			
—			
—			

- New Brunswick:

Note: Flags indicate national team as defined under FIFA eligibility rules; some limited exceptions apply. Players may hold more than one non-FIFA nationality.

No.	Pos.	Nation	Player
—			
—			
—			
—			
—			
—			
—			
—			
—			
—			

No.	Pos.	Nation	Player
—			
—			
—			
—			
—			
—			
—			
—			
—			
—			

- Prince Edward Island:

Note: Flags indicate national team as defined under FIFA eligibility rules; some limited exceptions apply. Players may hold more than one non-FIFA nationality.

No.	Pos.	Nation	Player
—			
—			
—			
—			
—			
—			
—			
—			
—			
—			

No.	Pos.	Nation	Player
—			
—			
—			
—			
—			
—			
—			
—			
—			
—			

=== Nova Scotia: Halifax City Coldwell Banker ===
Note: Flags indicate national team as defined under FIFA eligibility rules; some limited exceptions apply. Players may hold more than one non-FIFA nationality.

No.	Pos.	Nation	Player
—			
—			
—			
—			
—			
—			
—			
—			
—			
—			

No.	Pos.	Nation	Player
—			
—			
—			
—			
—			
—			
—			
—			
—			
—			

=== Newfoundland and Labrador:St. Lawrence Laurentians ===
Note: Flags indicate national team as defined under FIFA eligibility rules; some limited exceptions apply. Players may hold more than one non-FIFA nationality.

No.	Pos.	Nation	Player
1	GK	CAN	John Douglas
3	DF	CAN	Marc Pittman
4	??	CAN	Michael Douglas
6	??	CAN	Paul Slaney
7	??	CAN	Joe Cecchini
8	FW	CAN	Jonathan Pickett
9	FW	CAN	Richard Kelly
10	MF	CAN	Rudy Norman
11	MF	CAN	Clinton Edwards
12	??	CAN	Blair Aylward

No.	Pos.	Nation	Player
13	??	CAN	Michael Howlett
14	??	CAN	Robert Kelly
15	??	CAN	Darren Pike
16	??	CAN	Leo Adam Loder
18	??	CAN	Patrick Edwards
20	??	CAN	Ryan Slaney
21	??	CAN	Paul Klarke Pike
22	??	CAN	Andrew Perrot
—	??	CAN	Tristan Slaney

== Results ==
5 October 2007	(Alberta) Calgary Callies	2–0	(Quebec) Panellios SC Montreal

5 October 2007	(New Brunswick) Fredericton Picaroons Reds	3–1	(Prince Edward Island)
				Attendance: 400(est.)

5 October 2007	(British Columbia)	0–0	(Saskatchewan) Yorkton United
				Attendance: 800(est.)

5 October 2007	(Nova Scotia) Halifax City S.C.	1–1	(Ontario)
				Attendance: 2,000(est.)

6 October 2007	v

6 October 2007	v

6 October 2007	v

6 October 2007	v

7 October 2007	v

7 October 2007	v

7 October 2007	v

7 October 2007	v

8 October 2007 9th Place	Eliot River	*-.	(Saskatchewan) Yorkton United

8 October 2007 7th Place	Woodbridge Italia	*-.	Panellios SC Montreal

8 October 2007 5th Place	Sons of Italy	*-.	Fredericton Picaroons Reds

8 October 2007 Bronze Medal	St. Lawrence Laurentians	2–1	Halifax City S.C.
	Paul Slaney; Richard Kelly	CSA

8 October 2007 Gold Medal	Calgary Callies (Alberta)	5–0	(British Columbia) Columbus Clan FC	Halifax, Nova Scotia
	Mark Slade; Cenek Patik; Nic Reyes	News		Referee: Jonathan Lavergne

== Qualification ==
The teams qualify by the various Provincial competitions.

(British Columbia)	v

AB	v

SK	v

MB	v

16 September 2007; Ontario Cup	Woodbridge Italia	2–1	Erin Mills Eagles
		OSA Report

(Quebec)	v

(New Brunswick)	v

(Prince Edward Island)	v

(Nova Scotia)	v

3-Sep=2007 (Newfoundland and Labrador)	St. Lawrence Laurentians	2–1	Mount Pearl
	7' John Pickett; 84' Adam Loder	Report	88' Will Hearn	Referee: Mike Edmunds; Assistant referees: Keith Pike & Gary Stead

=== Ontario ===
Woodbridge Italia defeated Erin Mills Eagles 2–1 on 16 September 2007 to claim the Ontario Cup.

=== Nova Scotia ===
The top 4 teams from the Nova Scotia Soccer League (excluding the teams from PEI and NB) competed in the Final 4 to determine the representative for the Canadian National Challenge Cup.

Quarterfinals
Halifax City Coldwell Banker
Dartmouth United

Semifinals
bye
bye
Halifax County United Athens

Finals
Halifax Dunbrack
