= NLCC =

NLCC may refer to:

- Navy League Cadet Corps, the U.S. Navy cadet programme developed for younger members aged 11–14
- Navy League Cadet Corps (Canada), a Canadian civilian youth navy cadet programme unaffiliated with the Canadian military
- Newfoundland and Labrador Challenge Cup, a Canadian senior men's amateur soccer league based in the province of Newfoundland and Labrador
