= Manitoba Major Soccer League =

- Founded: 1971
- Country: Canada
- Confederation: CONCACAF
- Domestic cup(s): Challenge Trophy (men); Jubilee Trophy (women)
- Website: www.mmsl.ca

The Manitoba Major Soccer League (MMSL) is an adult soccer system based in Manitoba, Canada. The MMSL has both indoor and outdoor leagues. It is sanctioned by the Manitoba Soccer Association (MSA), a branch of the Canadian Soccer Association (CSA).

The highest level of amateur soccer in the province of Manitoba is the MMSL Premier Division. Winners of the Manitoba Soccer Provincial Championships (MSA Cup) are eligible to represent the province and compete for the Challenge Trophy, the highest national amateur cup competition in Canada sanctioned by the CSA.

Players come with a variety of playing backgrounds, including high school, college, university, academies, semi-professional, and ex-professionals.

== History ==
Founded in 1971, the league was previously known as Manitoba Central Soccer League (1971–1999) and the Molson Super Soccer Alliance (1990–1999). As a non-profit organization, the league is overseen by a volunteer board.

== League structure ==
MMSL features over 85 teams overall, who compete in 9 outdoor divisions. In the winter months MMSL offer indoor league play at 6 levels of competition.

Playoff divisional champions receive a cash-prize of $250.

== Teams ==
As of the 2026 outdoor season.

=== Premier ===
Team	Location
FC Winnipeg Lions	Winnipeg
Hellas SC	Winnipeg
Lucania FC	Winnipeg
Sporting Club Mosaic	Winnipeg
NKMB Saints	Winnipeg
FC Sich	Winnipeg
Luso Canadians SC	Winnipeg
Bonivital Flames	Winnipeg
United FC	Winnipeg

=== Division 1 ===
Team	Location
Winnipeg FC	Winnipeg
Northern United	Winnipeg
UDM FC	Winnipeg
Bonvital Flames 2	Winnipeg
Sher-E-Punjab FC	Winnipeg
Grant Park Sporting Club	Winnipeg
Hanover Kickers	Steinbach
Scorpions FC	Winnipeg

=== Division 2 ===
Team	Location
CA River Plate	Winnipeg
United Punjab Sports Club	Winnipeg
Hanover Strikers	Winnipeg
Sporting Club Mosaic A	Winnipeg
Kildonan Cavaliers	Winnipeg
FCNWNexGen	Winnipeg
FC IPAC-UKRAINE	Winnipeg
CSSE Juventus	Stonewall
TDS	Winnipeg
Richmond Kings FC	Winnipeg

=== Division 3 ===
Team	Location
WSP FC	Winnipeg
Purple Cobras FC	Winnipeg
Elmwood FC	Winnipeg
Thunder FC	Winnipeg
Monday United	Winnipeg
Bandits FC	Winnipeg
Storm City FC	Winnipeg
Pescara FC	Winnipeg
PSJ	Winnipeg
Stonewall United	Stonewall
Dunvegan Castle FC	Winnipeg
YFC Saints FC	Winnipeg
St. James Spurs	Winnipeg
Maples FC	Winnipeg
Triumph FC	Winnipeg
Wasps FC	Winnipeg
NK Croatia	Winnipeg
Hanover Sting	Steinbach

=== Division 4 ===
Team	Location
United Weston FC	Winnipeg
Borderless Ballers FC	Winnipeg
Northern Lights FC	Winnipeg
Moose FC	Winnipeg
Blue Lock United	Winnipeg
Mecs FC	Winnipeg
Crescentwood Saturday	Winnipeg
Latino Power	Blumenort
Real Sociedads	Winnipeg
Akal FC	Winnipeg

=== Division 5 ===
Team	Location
Prairie United	Portage La Prairie
Storm FC	Winnipeg
Landmark FC	Landmark
Markhor Devils United	Winnipeg
Red River Rovers	Winnipeg
Fratelli Di Calabria FC	Winnipeg
BFR AC	Winnipeg
East Kildonan United FC	Winnipeg
Back Pack FC	Winnipeg
Free Agents FC	Winnipeg

== Champions ==
Year	Team
1971	Ital-Inter
1972	Unknown
1973	Unknown
1974	Unknown
1975	Unknown
1976	Unknown
1977	Unknown
1978	Unknown
1979	Ital-Inter
1980	Portuguese
1981	Tatra
1982	Winnipeg Bari
1983	Ital-Inter
1984	Ital-Inter
1985	Ital-Inter
1986	Unknown
1987	Lucania
1988 MCSL	Germania Kickers
1988 SSA	Lucania
1989 MCSL	Germania Kickers
1989 SSA	Lucania
1990 MCSL	Grant Mill Sword
1990 SSA	Lucania
1991 MCSL	Sokol
1991 SSA	Lucania
1992 MCSL	Britannia Rovers
1992 SSA	Lucania
1993 MCSL	Thistle
1993 SSA	Lucania
1994 MCSL	Sokol
1994 SSA	Lucania
1995 MCSL	Romania
1995 SSA	Lucania
1996 MCSL	Thistle
1997 MCSL	Grant Mill
1997 SSA	Lucania
1998 MCSL	White Eagles
1999 MCSL	White Eagles
1999 SSA	Lucania & Sons of Italy Lions
2000	Britannia Rovers
2001	Grant Mill Sword
2002	Sokol S.C.
2003	Sons of Italy Lions
2004	Sons of Italy Lions
2005	Lucania
2006	Sons of Italy Lions
2007	Sons of Italy Lions
2008	Lucania
2009	Hellas
2010	Sons of Italy Lions
2011	Sons of Italy Lions
2012	Hellas
2013	Winnipeg Lions
2014	Winnipeg Lions
2015	Winnipeg Lions
2016	Winnipeg Lions
2017	Winnipeg Lions
2018	Winnipeg Lions
2019	Winnipeg Lions
2020	Ital-Inter
2021	Bonivital United
2022	Hellas
2023	Winnipeg Lions
2024	Hellas
2025	Hellas

== Play-off ==
- 2005 Lucania S.C.
- 2006 Lucania S.C.
- 2007 F.C. Lusitania
- 2008 Lucania S.C.
- 2009 Hellas S.C.
