= King George V Park =

Soccer venue in St. John's, Newfoundland, Canada

Coordinates: 47°34′39.95″N 52°42′05.03″W

- Interactive map of King George V Park
- Location: St. John's, Newfoundland
- Owner: City of St. John's
- Operator: City of St. John's
- Capacity: 6,400 (Soccer)
- Surface: FieldTurf
- Record attendance: 13,000 (Canada v Honduras, 14 September 1985)

Construction
- Opened: 22 June 1925
- Renovated: 2006
- Cost: $ 3,500,000

Tenants
- NLSA; Memorial Sea-Hawks; Holy Cross; Feildians

King George V Park is a soccer-specific stadium in St. John's, Newfoundland, located at the head of Quidi Vidi Lake in downtown St. John's. The stadium was built in 1925 as the National stadium of Newfoundland. It is the oldest surviving soccer specific stadium in North America, and hosts the Memorial Sea-Hawks soccer teams.

== History ==
The most famous game played at King George V was on 14 September 1985 when over 13,000 people witnessed Canada's 2–1 victory over Honduras to win the 1985 CONCACAF Championship; the match also qualified Canada for their first World Cup (Mexico, 1986). It was a momentous occasion and is considered to be the first high point of Canadian soccer history.

The stadium played host to the 1987 FIFA U-16 World Championship.

In 2005 construction began on a major renovation involving widening and lengthening the field surface, installing an underground irrigation system, constructing new locker room facilities as well as expanding the bleacher seating. In 2006, the natural grass playing surface was replaced with a FieldTurf pitch. It seats 6,400 for soccer.

In 2008, KGV played host to the Challenge Cup and the Jubilee Trophy.

== See also ==
- Royal eponyms in Canada
