= PoCo City FC =

- Full name: PoCo City Football Club
- Founded: 2012
- Stadium: Percy Perry Stadium
- Capacity: 1,482
- League: Pacific Coast Soccer League

PoCo City FC is a Canadian soccer team based in Coquitlam, British Columbia, Canada. Founded in 2012, the team plays in Pacific Coast Soccer League (PCSL), a national amateur league at the fourth tier of the American Soccer Pyramid, which features teams from western Canada and the Pacific Northwest region of the United States of America. The team plays its home matches in at Percy Perry Stadium.
