= SC Hellas =

Hellas SC
- Full name: Hellas Soccer Club
- Founded: 1974
- League: Manitoba Major Soccer League
- 2010 MMSL Premier One: 3rd
Home colours	Away colours

Hellas SC is an amateur soccer club based in Winnipeg, Manitoba. The club plays in the Manitoba Major Soccer League.

They won the Manitoba Soccer Association Cup in 2008, 2009, 2022 and 2024, as well as the Canadian National Challenge Cup in 2009.

== Year by year ==
Year	Level	League	Regular season	MSA Cup	Nationals
2006	5	Manitoba Major Soccer League (Premier One)	2nd		
2007	5	Manitoba Major Soccer League (Premier One)	4th		
2008	5	Manitoba Major Soccer League (Premier One)	3rd	Champion	8th
2009	5	Manitoba Major Soccer League (Premier One)	1st	Champion	Champion
2010	5	Manitoba Major Soccer League (Premier One)	3rd		n/a
2011	5	Manitoba Major Soccer League (Premier One)	2nd		n/a
2012	5	Manitoba Major Soccer League (Premier One)	1st	2nd	current
