= Ryan Anstey =

Canadian soccer player (born 1983)

Personal information
- Full name: Ryan Anstey
- Date of birth: May 13, 1983 (age 43)
- Place of birth: Charlottetown, Prince Edward Island, Canada
- Height: 5 ft 11 in (1.80 m)
- Position: Striker

Youth career
- 2001–2006: UPEI Panthers

Senior career*
Years	Team	Apps	(Gls)
2006	Toronto Lynx		
2010	Churchill Arms FC		
- * Club domestic league appearances and goals as of January 12, 2007

Ryan Anstey (born May 13, 1983) is a Canadian former professional soccer player. He played in 2006 for Toronto Lynx, where the Lynx finished second in the Open Canada Cup. Anstey also won a national championship with his hometown Churchill Arms FC in 2010. In 2005, he was named Canadian University player of the year.

Before turning pro Anstey played 5 years, in the Canadian Interuniversity Sport league (now U Sports), for the UPEI Panthers. Ryan's five years with the Panthers, he scored 43 career regular season goals, ranking him 3rd all-time in the conference behind Jeff Hibberts and Ross Webb, but first in his school's history.

In 2005 Anstey led the Nation in scoring with 15 goals in only 8 games played, winning by a 4-goal margin. He was named a First Team Conference All-Star for the third consecutive year. As well Anstey was named Atlantic conference MVP and was awarded the Joe Johnson Memorial Trophy as the Canadian Interuniversity Sport (U Sports) Player of the Year, making Anstey only the second Panther to receive the award after Glenn Miller in 1998. Shortly after his career ended at UPEI, his #10 jersey was retired by the University.

In 2018 Ryan was inducted into the UPEI Hall of fame.

In 2006 Anstey signed a two-year professional contract with the Toronto Lynx of the USL First Division, he made his debut on Tuesday, July 11 against the Montreal Impact. He missed most of the season with injuries forcing him only to play 9 games. He also helped the Lynx to a team-record undefeated streak at home to 10 games, And reached the final of the Open Canada Cup.

In 2010 Anstey was a member of the Churchill Arms FC team that captured the Canadian National Challenge Cup at the BMO National Championships hosted in Charlottetown, Prince Edward Island. Anstey scored in the final round robin game to send the PEI representative to the final (1-0). He also scored in extra time of the Gold Medal Match, to help Churchill Arms secure the national title. Churchill Arms remains the only team from Prince Edward Island to win a National Championship in soccer.

Ryan Anstey graduated from UNB Law School in 2011.

Anstey is currently a Lawyer in Medicine Hat, Alberta, Canada.

== Sources ==
- www.unb.ca
