= Feildians Athletic Association =

Feildians
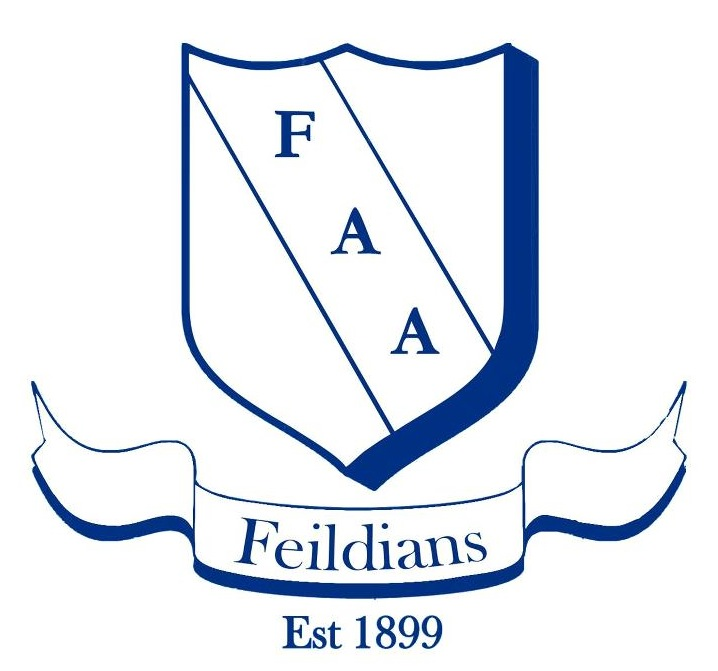
- Full name: Feildians Athletic Association
- Nickname: The Double Blues
- Short name: FAA
- Founded: 1899; 127 years ago
- Stadium: Feildian Grounds (general use); Gushue Sports Complex (senior men's soccer)
- Manager: Sipho Sibiya
- League: Newfoundland and Labrador Challenge Cup
- 2021: 1st
- Website: https://site3109.goalline.ca/index.php
Home colours	Away colours

The Feildians Athletic Association, commonly referred to as Feildians, is an athletic club in St. John's, Newfoundland and Labrador, Canada. Clubs participate in a wide range of athletics including soccer, basketball, baseball and hockey. Historically, the club also participated in track and field, cricket and even bowling. The Old Feildian Athletic Association was officially formed in April 1899 as the Feildian Club with the election of the Hon. Edgar Bowring as president. The club motto is "Mens sana in corpore sano", meaning a healthy mind in a healthy body.

== History ==
On June 10, 1929, the club opened a multi-use facility on Rennie's Mill Road in the East End of St. John's. The Feildians made the facility available to all soccer teams (both male and female) who play under the Feildians Athletic Association banner.

The club is one of the oldest formed athletic associations in all of Canada. Founded in 1899, before the province of Newfoundland and Labrador (NL) was yet part of Canada. Originally stemming from Bishop Feild College as an offshoot for athletics, the club has since thrived in the capital of NL.

The Feildians Athletic Association was inducted into the Sport NL Hall of Fame as a builder on November 16, 1991.

After a long absence, a group of former and current players and executives began the process of reviving the Youth Athletics Programs. That year saw the relaunch of youth programs in both soccer and basketball. In conjunction with the youth system revival, major work began around the nearly 100 year old Feildian Grounds facility including a new clubhouse and plans for improved field infrastructure (turf).

== Soccer ==
=== Senior ===
The Men's squad (aged 18–35) is a member of the Newfoundland and Labrador Challenge Cup League. The club has one provincial title, dating back to 1969. Winners of the Challenge Cup Playoffs represent NL at The Challenge Trophy Canadian Soccer Association National Championships each year. The Women's squad (aged 18–35) is a member of the Jubilee Trophy League. Winners of the Jubilee Trophy Playoffs represent NL at the National Championships each year.

The 2015 summer season ended in a semi-final loss for both the Men's & Women's teams. The men dropped a 1-0 decision against Provisional Championship Hosts, Mount Pearl. The women fell 2–0 to Holy Cross at the Topsail Turf Complex in Conception Bay South.

The Men's squad finished the 2016 season in 4th place with a record of 12 wins, 3 draws and 7 losses for a total of 39 points. The team scored 46 goals and allowed 30 during the 22 regular season games. The playoffs ended with a 2–0 loss to St. Lawrence in the quarter-finals. Zach Hynes led the team in scoring with 11 goals, good for 3rd most in the league.

=== Youth ===
Since the 2011 relaunch of Youth soccer within the club, the Feildians have sent two provincial champions as NL representative to Canadian Soccer Association National Championship tournaments. In 2015 the Under 16 Boys squad finished in 8th place with a 1–4 record at the Surrey, British Columbia hosted tournament. The same core group of Feildian youth players also represented NL at the Under 14 National Championships in Lethbridge, Alberta where they finished as winners of the consolation bracket.

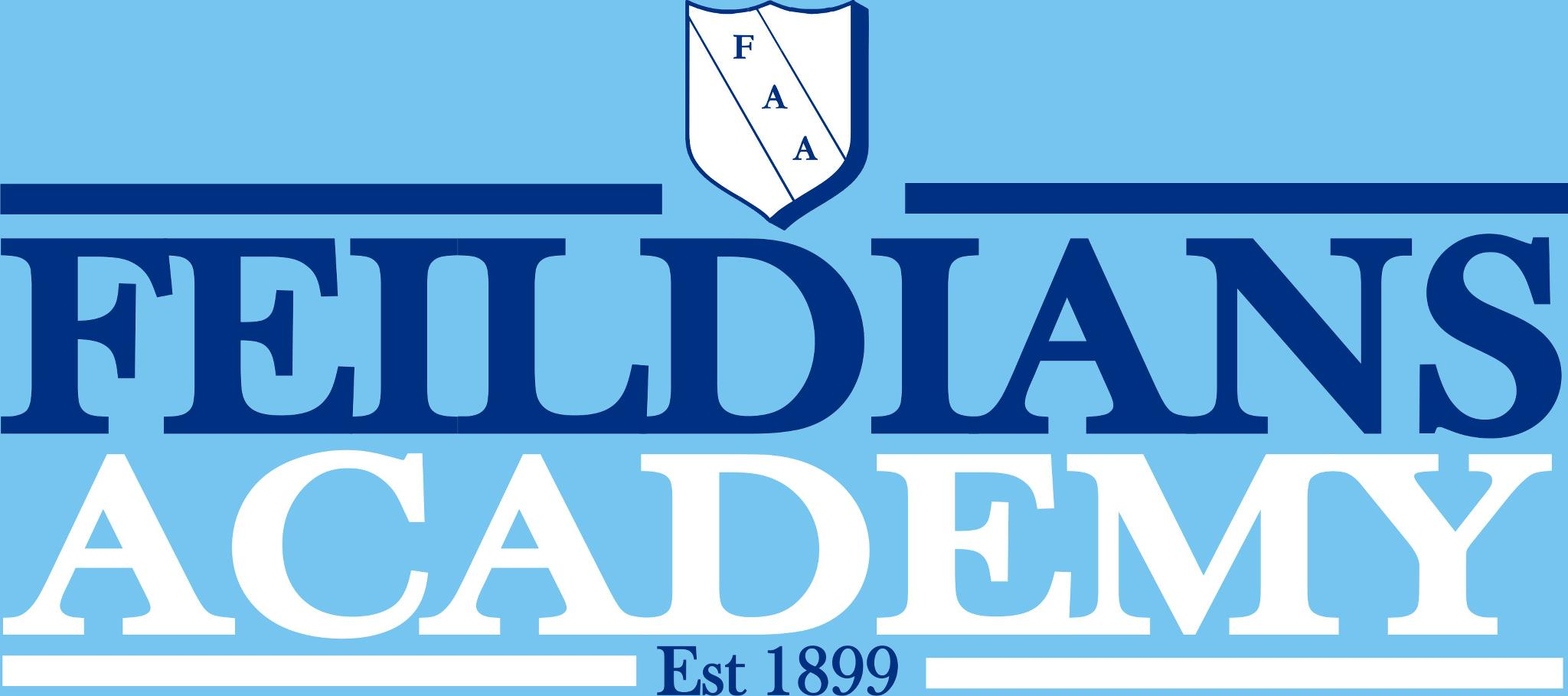
FAA Academy Logo

One of the success stories to emerge from the Feildians Athletic Association Youth Academy since its relaunch in 2011 has been Striker Emmanuel Dolo. Dolo has played with the Senior squad on numerous occasions and participated in National Youth Squad camps, has had trials with the Vancouver Whitecaps FC & Montreal Impact Academy respectively.

The 2016 summer season was the first to completely bridge the gap from Under 6s to Senior Soccer as the club will have a full youth academy in both boys and girls leagues from Under 6 up to Senior level soccer. All youth and senior teams compete under the Newfoundland & Labrador Soccer Association.

The Under-18 Boys team emerged as provincial champions and represented Newfoundland & Labrador at the U18 Cup in Vaughan, ON from October 5–10, 2016. The team finished 4th in Group A with a final record of 1-1-2 for 4 points and a goal difference of +/- 0. The team earned a notable tie (2-2) against eventual tournament champion, Quebec. Emmanuel Dolo finished the tournament tied as the leading scorer with 4 goals in 5 games. Felly Elonda (2), Kyle Williams (1), Erduan Limani (1) and Josh Taylor (1) also scored for the club during the tournament. The team finished the week in 8th place.

== Honours ==
- Newfoundland and Labrador Challenge Cup Champions (3) : 1969, 2021, 2023
