= Newfoundland and Labrador Challenge Cup =

- Founded: 1950 (All-Nfld. Series); 1967 (Challenge Cup)
- Country: Canada
- Confederation: CONCACAF
- Number of clubs: 9 (from 2025)
- Domestic cup: Challenge Trophy
- Current champions: Holy Cross FC (2024)
- Most championships: St. Lawrence (25 titles)
- Website: nlsa.ca

The Newfoundland and Labrador Challenge Cup, known as the Johnson Insurance Challenge Cup for sponsorship reasons, is the premier senior men's soccer league in the Canadian province of Newfoundland and Labrador. The competition is held annually from May until September and is governed and organized by the Newfoundland and Labrador Soccer Association. It is a tier 5 league in the Canadian soccer pyramid, and as a result the winning club qualifies to compete for the Challenge Trophy as the representative for Newfoundland and Labrador in October of each year. The St. Lawrence Laurentians and Holy Cross have traditionally dominated the competition, having won a combined total of 48 Cups out of the 58 times that it has been contested.

== Competition format ==
The Newfoundland Challenge Cup consists of Newfoundland and Labrador-based men's senior amateur soccer clubs. The teams first compete to qualify for a playoff round in a league format, usually a quadruple- or hextuple-round robin system, depending on the number of clubs competing. Normally teams play around 20 league matches in a single season. At the end of the league phase the 4 clubs with the most points qualify for the playoffs (3 points are awarded for a win, 1 point is awarded for a draw, and none for a loss). Clubs are ranked by total points, then head-to-head record, then goal differential and then goals scored. If two clubs are still tied for a playoff position then a penalty kick competition at a venue decided by the league will determine the ranking. If three or more clubs are still tied the ranking will be determined by the drawing of lots.

The playoff round of the NLCC uses a Page playoff format, which was reinstituted in 2015 after the league switched to a more typical two round format in 2011. The competition takes place at one location over Labour Day weekend each year. The winner of the final qualifies for the Canadian National Challenge Cup as the representative for Newfoundland and Labrador.

== Champions ==
=== Pre-Challenge Cup era (1950-1966) ===
The list below contains the provincial men's soccer champions of pre-Challenge Cup era. The provincial champion was the winner of the All-Newfoundland Series (or J.V. Rabbits Trophy), which was organised by the local soccer associations of St. John's, Corner Brook and the Burin Peninsula. It was first contested in 1950 and the last edition was held in 1966. It was a cup contested by the best teams of the aforementioned local competitions.

- 1950 Holy Cross FC
- 1951 St. Lawrence Laurentians
- 1952 St. Lawrence Laurentians
- 1953 St. John's All-Stars
- 1954 Corner Brook All-Stars
- 1955 St. Lawrence Laurentians

- 1956 Corner Brook
- 1957 St. John's Guards
- 1958 St. John's Guards
- 1959 St. John's Guards
- 1960 Grand Bank GeeBees
- 1961 Corner Brook Royals

- 1962 Corner Brook Royals
- 1963 St. John's St. Pat's
- 1964 Grand Bank GeeBees
- 1965 St. John's Guards
- 1966 St. Lawrence Laurentians

=== Challenge Cup era (1967-present) ===
In 1967 the Newfoundland Soccer Association joined Canada Soccer. Therefore, the All-Newfoundland Championship was replaced by a new year-round competition organised by the provincial soccer association itself: the Challenge Cup. The teams in the Challenge Cup play a season-long ranking competition against each other.

- 1967 St. Lawrence Laurentians
- 1968 St. Lawrence Laurentians
- 1969 Feildians AA of St. John's
- 1970 Grand Bank Gee Bees
- 1971 St. Lawrence Laurentians
- 1972 St. Lawrence Laurentians
- 1973 Holy Cross FC
- 1974 Grand Bank Gee Bees
- 1975 St. Lawrence Laurentians
- 1976 St. Lawrence Laurentians
- 1977 St. Lawrence Laurentians
- 1978 St. Lawrence Laurentians
- 1979 Holy Cross FC
- 1980 St. Lawrence Laurentians
- 1981 Holy Cross FC
- 1982 St. Lawrence Laurentians
- 1983 Holy Cross FC
- 1984 Holy Cross FC
- 1985 Holy Cross FC
- 1986 Holy Cross FC

- 1987 Lawn Shamrocks
- 1988 Holy Cross FC
- 1989 Holy Cross FC
- 1990 Burin Eagles
- 1991 Burin Eagles
- 1992 Holy Cross FC
- 1993 St. Lawrence Laurentians
- 1994 Holy Cross FC
- 1995 St. Lawrence Laurentians
- 1996 St. Lawrence Laurentians
- 1997 St. Lawrence Laurentians
- 1998 St. Lawrence Laurentians
- 1999 St. Lawrence Laurentians
- 2000 St. Lawrence Laurentians
- 2001 St. Lawrence Laurentians
- 2002 St. Lawrence Laurentians
- 2003 Mount Pearl FC
- 2004 Marystown United
- 2005 St. Lawrence Laurentians
- 2006 St. Lawrence Laurentians

- 2007 St. Lawrence Laurentians
- 2008 St. Lawrence Laurentians
- 2009 Holy Cross FC
- 2010 Holy Cross FC
- 2011 Holy Cross FC
- 2012 Holy Cross FC
- 2013 St. Lawrence Laurentians
- 2014 Holy Cross FC
- 2015 Holy Cross FC
- 2016 St. Lawrence Laurentians
- 2017 Holy Cross FC
- 2018 Holy Cross FC
- 2019 Holy Cross FC
- 2020 Holy Cross FC
- 2021 Feildians AA St. John's
- 2022 Holy Cross FC
- 2023 Feildians AA St. John's
- 2024 Holy Cross FC
- 2025 Holy Cross FC

== Titles ==
The table here below shows the number of wins in the Challenge Cup (1967 to present). Challenge Cup winners that have also won the All-Newfoundland Series, have the number of wins in that predecessor competition added to their total between parentheses.

Clubs in bold currently compete in the Challenge Cup.

| Club | Wins | Winning seasons |
|---|---|---|
| **St. Lawrence Laurentians** | 25 (+4) | 1967, 1968, 1971, 1972, 1975, 1976, 1977, 1978, 1980, 1982, 1993, 1995, 1996, 1997, 1998, 1999, 2000, 2001, 2002, 2005, 2006, 2007, 2008, 2013, 2016 |
| **Holy Cross FC** | 23 (+1) | 1973, 1979, 1981, 1983, 1984, 1985, 1986, 1988, 1989, 1992, 1994, 2009, 2010, 2011, 2012, 2014, 2015, 2017, 2018, 2019, 2020, 2022, 2024 |
| Grand Bank GeeBees | 2 (+2) | 1970, 1974 |
| **Feildians AA** | 3 | 1969, 2021, 2023 |
| Burin Eagles | 2 | 1990, 1991 |
| Marystown United | 1 | 2004 |
| **Mount Pearl FC** | 1 | 2003 |
| Lawn Shamrocks | 1 | 1987 |

== Recent seasons ==
=== 1999 ===
In 1999, Marystown United lost the Newfoundland and Labrador Challenge Cup 2-1 to St. Lawrence Laurentians.

=== 2004 ===
In 2004 Marystown United were the Newfoundland and Labrador Challenge Cup Champions. They went on to play in the 2004 Canadian National Challenge Cup finishing 8th.

=== 2010 ===
==== Standings ====
| Pos | Team | Pld | W | D | L | GF | GA | GD | Pts | Qualification |
|---|---|---|---|---|---|---|---|---|---|---|
| 1 | Holy Cross (Q) | 23 | 17 | 5 | 1 | 67 | 16 | +51 | 56 | 2010 NLCC Playoffs |
| 2 | Mount Pearl (Q) | 23 | 15 | 6 | 2 | 53 | 14 | +39 | 51 | 2010 NLCC Playoffs |
| 3 | St. Lawrence Laurentians (Q) | 23 | 15 | 4 | 4 | 62 | 19 | +43 | 49 | 2010 NLCC Playoffs |
| 4 | Feildians (Q) | 23 | 8 | 3 | 12 | 44 | 48 | −4 | 27 | 2010 NLCC Playoffs |
| 5 | Conception Bay Strikers | 23 | 4 | 3 | 16 | 20 | 63 | −43 | 15 | |
| 6 | Western United | 23 | 3 | 1 | 19 | 20 | 76 | −56 | 10 | |
| 7 | St. John's U-18s (Note: Playing on an exhibition basis only, however points earned against them still count towards the standings) | 18 | 4 | 2 | 12 | 25 | 55 | −30 | 14 | |

Updated to match(es) played on August 29, 2010. Source: NLSA
Rules for classification: 1) points; 2) head-to-head record; 3) total goal differential; 4) total goals scored; 5) penalty kick competition
(Q) Qualified for the phase indicated

==== Playoffs ====
| 3 September 2010 Quarter Final 1 | **Holy Cross** | **1 – 0** | **Mount Pearl** | St. Lawrence |
| | Hawco 63' | | | Stadium: Centennial Field |

| 3 September 2010 Quarter Final 2 | **St. Lawrence** | **7 – 1** | **Feildians** | St. Lawrence |
| | Caines (x2); Edwards; Grant; Slaney; Turpin; Howlett | | Hynes | Stadium: Centennial Field |

| 4 September 2010 Semi Final | **St. Lawrence** | **1 – 1** (a.e.t.) (**Mount Pearl win on** p) | **Mount Pearl** | St. Lawrence |
| | Kelly 92' | | McLeod 112' | Stadium: Centennial Field |

| 5 September 2010 Final | **Holy Cross** | **3 – 1** | **Mount Pearl** | St. Lawrence |
| | Anstey; Breen; Wade | | McLeod | Stadium: Centennial Field |

=== 2011 ===
==== Standings ====
| Pos | Team | Pld | W | D | L | GF | GA | GD | Pts | Qualification |
|---|---|---|---|---|---|---|---|---|---|---|
| 1 | Holy Cross (Q) | 20 | 18 | 1 | 1 | 76 | 9 | +67 | 55 | 2011 NLCC Playoffs |
| 2 | Mount Pearl (Q) | 20 | 13 | 3 | 4 | 49 | 17 | +32 | 42 | 2011 NLCC Playoffs |
| 3 | St. Lawrence Laurentians (Q) | 20 | 9 | 2 | 9 | 27 | 30 | −3 | 29 | 2011 NLCC Playoffs |
| 4 | Feildians (Q) | 20 | 7 | 2 | 11 | 19 | 35 | −16 | 23 | 2011 NLCC Playoffs |
| 5 | Conception Bay Strikers | 20 | 6 | 4 | 10 | 29 | 33 | −4 | 22 | |
| 6 | St. John's U-18s (Note: Playing on an exhibition basis only, however points earned against them still count towards the standings) | 20 | 0 | 2 | 18 | 7 | 83 | −76 | 2 | |

Updated to match(es) played on August 24, 2011. Source: NLSA
Rules for classification: 1) points; 2) head-to-head record; 3) total goal differential; 4) total goals scored; 5) penalty kick competition
(Q) Qualified for the phase indicated

==== Playoffs ====
| 2 September 2011 Semi Final | **Holy Cross** | **1 – 0** | **Feildians** | St. John's |
| 18:30 NST UTC−3.5 | Hawco 79' | | | Stadium: King George V Park |

| 2 September 2011 Semi Final | **Mount Pearl** | **3 – 1** (a.e.t.) | **St. Lawrence** | St. John's |
| 20:30 NST UTC−3.5 | Pickford 13', 109'; Oram 107' | | Edwards 75' | Stadium: King George V Park |

| 4 September 2011 Final | **Holy Cross** | **1 – 1** (a.e.t.) (**4 – 3** p) | **Mount Pearl** | St. John's |
| 15:00 NST UTC−3.5 | Yetman 107' | | Manning 92' | Stadium: King George V Park |

=== 2012 ===
==== Standings ====
| Pos | Team | Pld | W | D | L | GF | GA | GD | Pts | Qualification |
|---|---|---|---|---|---|---|---|---|---|---|
| 1 | Holy Cross (Q) | 19 | 16 | 1 | 2 | 80 | 15 | +65 | 49 | 2012 NLCC Playoffs |
| 2 | St. Lawrence Laurentians (Q) | 19 | 11 | 2 | 6 | 55 | 29 | +26 | 35 | 2012 NLCC Playoffs |
| 3 | Feildians (Q) | 19 | 9 | 3 | 7 | 30 | 28 | +2 | 30 | 2012 NLCC Playoffs |
| 4 | Mount Pearl (Q) | 19 | 7 | 5 | 7 | 33 | 21 | +12 | 26 | 2012 NLCC Playoffs |
| 5 | Conception Bay Strikers | 19 | 5 | 3 | 11 | 28 | 61 | −33 | 18 | |
| 6 | St. John's U-18s (Note: Playing on an exhibition basis only, however points earned against them still count towards the standings) | 15 | 0 | 0 | 15 | 6 | 78 | −72 | 0 | |

Updated to match(es) played on August 19, 2012. Source: NLSA
Rules for classification: 1) points; 2) head-to-head record; 3) total goal differential; 4) total goals scored; 5) penalty kick competition
(Q) Qualified for the phase indicated

==== Playoffs ====
| 31 August 2012 Semi Final | **Holy Cross** | **4 – 0** | **Mount Pearl** | Mount Pearl |
| 18:30 NST UTC−3.5 | Hawco; DeLong; Warren; Wade | | | Stadium: Gushue Complex |

| 31 August 2012 Semi Final | **St. Lawrence** | **1 – 2** | **Feildians** | Mount Pearl |
| 20:30 NST UTC−3.5 | Slaney 23' | | Mandville 40' (pen.); Hynes 70' | Stadium: Gushue Complex |

| 2 September 2012 Final | **Holy Cross** | **2 - 0** | **Feildians** | Mount Pearl |
| : NST UTC−3.5 | Reddick 27'; Wade 70' | | | Stadium: Gushue Complex |

=== 2013 ===
==== Standings ====
| Pos | Team | Pld | W | D | L | GF | GA | GD | Pts | Qualification |
|---|---|---|---|---|---|---|---|---|---|---|
| 1 | Holy Cross (Q) | 27 | 19 | 5 | 3 | 94 | 26 | +68 | 62 | 2013 NLCC Playoffs |
| 2 | St. Lawrence Laurentians (Q) | 27 | 15 | 7 | 5 | 66 | 22 | +44 | 52 | 2013 NLCC Playoffs |
| 3 | Mount Pearl (Q) | 27 | 12 | 4 | 11 | 35 | 38 | −3 | 40 | 2013 NLCC Playoffs |
| 4 | Feildians (Q) | 27 | 10 | 9 | 8 | 35 | 29 | +6 | 39 | 2013 NLCC Playoffs |
| 5 | Conception Bay Strikers | 27 | 1 | 1 | 25 | 7 | 107 | −100 | 4 | |
| 6 | NL Canada Games Team (Note: Playing on an exhibition basis only, however points earned against them still count towards the standings) | 15 | 5 | 0 | 10 | 16 | 31 | −15 | 15 | |

Updated to match(es) played on August 21, 2013. Source: NLSA
Rules for classification: 1) points; 2) head-to-head record; 3) total goal differential; 4) total goals scored; 5) penalty kick competition
(Q) Qualified for the phase indicated

==== Playoffs ====
| 31 August 2013 Semi Final | **Holy Cross** | **0 – 1** | **Feildians** | St. Lawrence |
| 13:00 NST UTC−3.5 | | Report | Connolly 25' | Stadium: Centennial Field |

| 31 August 2013 Semi Final | **St. Lawrence** | **4 – 2** | **Mount Pearl** | St. Lawrence |
| 16:00 NST UTC−3.5 | Slaney; Norman; Edwards; Drew | Report | Hamlyn; Pickford | Stadium: Centennial Field |

| 1 September 2013 Final | **St. Lawrence** | **2 – 0** | **Feildians** | St. Lawrence |
| 15:00 NST UTC−3.5 | Drew 60', 74' | Report | | Stadium: Centennial Field; Attendance: 1,000 |

=== 2014 ===
==== Standings ====
| Pos | Team | Pld | W | D | L | GF | GA | GD | Pts | Qualification |
|---|---|---|---|---|---|---|---|---|---|---|
| 1 | Holy Cross (Q) | 18 | 12 | 3 | 3 | 37 | 19 | +18 | **39** | 2014 NLCC Playoff Final |
| 2 | St. Lawrence Laurentians (Q) | 18 | 7 | 4 | 7 | 25 | 24 | +1 | **25** | 2014 NLCC Playoff Semi Final |
| 3 | Mount Pearl (Q) | 18 | 6 | 2 | 10 | 19 | 33 | −14 | **20** | 2014 NLCC Playoff Semi Final |
| 4 | Feildians | 18 | 5 | 3 | 10 | 24 | 29 | −5 | **18** | |

Updated to match(es) played on August 17, 2014. Source: NLSA
Rules for classification: 1) points; 2) head-to-head record; 3) total goal differential; 4) total goals scored; 5) penalty kick competition
(Q) Qualified for the phase indicated

==== Playoffs ====
| 29 August 2014 Semi Final | **St. Lawrence** | **3 – 1** | **Mount Pearl** | St. John's |
| | Slaney 12', 58'; Mullett 13' | Report | Pickford 15' | Stadium: King George V Park |

| 31 August 2014 Final | **Holy Cross** | **2 – 0** | **St. Lawrence** | St. John's |
| 14:30 NST UTC−3.5 | Breen 78'; Yetman 88' | Report | | Stadium: King George V Park; Attendance: 1,800 |

=== 2015 ===
==== Standings ====
| Pos | Team | Pld | W | D | L | GF | GA | GD | Pts | Qualification |
|---|---|---|---|---|---|---|---|---|---|---|
| 1 | Holy Cross (Q) | 20 | 16 | 3 | 1 | 65 | 12 | +53 | 51 | 2015 NLCC Playoffs |
| 2 | St. Lawrence Laurentians (Q) | 20 | 14 | 2 | 4 | 46 | 11 | +35 | 44 | 2015 NLCC Playoffs |
| 3 | Mount Pearl (Q) | 20 | 11 | 3 | 6 | 39 | 18 | +21 | 36 | 2015 NLCC Playoffs |
| 4 | Feildians (Q) | 20 | 7 | 4 | 9 | 25 | 32 | −7 | 25 | 2015 NLCC Playoffs |
| 5 | Corner Brook United | 20 | 5 | 1 | 14 | 21 | 58 | −37 | 16 | |
| 6 | Conception Bay Strikers | 20 | 0 | 1 | 19 | 3 | 68 | −65 | 1 | |

Updated to match(es) played on 26 August 2015. Source: NLSA
Rules for classification: 1) points; 2) head-to-head record; 3) total goal differential; 4) total goals scored; 5) penalty kick competition
(Q) Qualified for the phase indicated

==== Playoffs ====
| 4 September 2015 Quarter Final 1 | **Holy Cross** | **3 – 1** | **St. Lawrence** | Mount Pearl |
| 18:00 NDT UTC−2.5 | Breen 8'; Williams 43'; Slaney 45' | Report | Drew 55' | Stadium: Gushue Complex |

| 4 September 2015 Quarter Final 2 | **Mount Pearl** | **1 – 0** | **Feildians** | Mount Pearl |
| 20:30 NDT UTC−2.5 | Reddy 43' | Report | | Stadium: Gushue Complex |

| 5 September 2015 Semi Final | **St. Lawrence** | **2 – 0** (a.e.t.) | **Mount Pearl** | Mount Pearl |
| 16:00 NDT UTC−2.5 | Gregory 98', 102' | Report | | Stadium: Gushue Complex |

| 6 September 2015 Final | **Holy Cross** | **2 – 0** | **St. Lawrence** | Mount Pearl |
| 15:30 NDT UTC−2.5 | Warren 5'; Williams | Report | | Stadium: Gushue Complex |

=== 2016 ===
==== Standings ====
| Pos | Team | Pld | W | D | L | GF | GA | GD | Pts | Qualification |
|---|---|---|---|---|---|---|---|---|---|---|
| 1 | Holy Cross (Q, C) | 22 | 16 | 4 | 2 | 59 | 18 | +41 | 52 | 2016 NLCC Playoffs |
| 2 | Mount Pearl (Q) | 22 | 14 | 3 | 5 | 45 | 20 | +25 | 45 | 2016 NLCC Playoffs |
| 3 | St. Lawrence Laurentians (Q) | 22 | 13 | 4 | 5 | 53 | 18 | +35 | 43 | 2016 NLCC Playoffs |
| 4 | Feildians (Q) | 22 | 12 | 3 | 7 | 46 | 30 | +16 | 39 | 2016 NLCC Playoffs |
| 5 | Corner Brook United | 22 | 2 | 4 | 16 | 21 | 58 | −37 | 10 | |
| 6 | Conception Bay Strikers | 22 | 0 | 3 | 19 | 7 | 75 | −68 | 3 | |
| 7 | NL Canada Games Team (Note: Playing on an exhibition basis only, however points earned against them still count toward the standings) | 12 | 3 | 3 | 6 | 15 | 27 | −12 | 12 | |

Updated to match(es) played on 24 August 2016. Source: NLSA
Rules for classification: 1) points; 2) head-to-head record; 3) total goal differential; 4) total goals scored; 5) penalty kick competition
(C) Champions; (Q) Qualified for the phase indicated

==== Playoffs ====
| 2 September 2016 Quarter-final 1 | **Holy Cross** | **2 – 3** | **Mount Pearl** | St. Lawrence |
| 13:00 NDT UTC−2.5 | 28' (o.g.); Williams 82' | | Forsey 58'; Morris 82'; Woodfine 90' | Stadium: Centennial Field |

| 2 September 2015 Quarter-final 2 | **St. Lawrence Laurentians** | **2 – 0** | **Feildians** | St. Lawrence |
| 16:00 NDT UTC−2.5 | Grant 21'; Drew 81' | | | Stadium: Centennial Field |

| 3 September 2015 Semi-final | **Holy Cross** | **1 – 1** (a.e.t.) (**0 – 3** p) | **St. Lawrence Laurentians** | St. Lawrence |
| NDT UTC−2.5 | Wade 13' | | Kelly 47' | Stadium: Centennial Field |

| 4 September 2015 Final | **Mount Pearl** | **1 – 2** (a.e.t.) | **St. Lawrence Laurentians** | St. Lawrence |
| NDT UTC−2.5 | Reddy 63' (pen.) | | Caines 43'; Hennebury 103' | Stadium: Centennial Field |

=== 2017 ===
==== Standings ====
| Pos | Team | Pld | W | D | L | GF | GA | GD | Pts | Qualification |
|---|---|---|---|---|---|---|---|---|---|---|
| 1 | St. Lawrence Laurentians (Q) | 23 | 16 | 3 | 4 | 47 | 12 | +35 | 51 | 2017 NLCC Playoffs |
| 2 | Holy Cross (Q) | 23 | 13 | 5 | 5 | 50 | 26 | +24 | 44 | 2017 NLCC Playoffs |
| 3 | Mount Pearl (Q) | 23 | 11 | 7 | 5 | 41 | 27 | +14 | 40 | 2017 NLCC Playoffs |
| 4 | Feildians (Q) | 23 | 9 | 6 | 8 | 32 | 27 | +5 | 33 | 2017 NLCC Playoffs |
| 5 | Conception Bay Strikers | 23 | 7 | 4 | 12 | 29 | 36 | −7 | 25 | |
| 6 | Corner Brook United | 23 | 1 | 1 | 21 | 5 | 71 | −66 | 4 | |
| 7 | NL Canada Games Team (Note: Playing on an exhibition basis only, however points earned against them still count toward the standings) | 18 | 6 | 4 | 8 | 25 | 36 | −11 | 22 | |

Updated to match(es) played on 23 August 2017. Source: NLSA
Rules for classification: 1) points; 2) head-to-head record; 3) total goal differential; 4) total goals scored; 5) penalty kick competition
(Q) Qualified for the phase indicated

== Canadian Challenge Trophy ==
This is a list of Newfoundland clubs who have reached the finals at the annual Canadian Challenge Trophy tournament, which features the best senior men's amateur clubs from each province in Canada. Holy Cross FC are currently the only Newfoundland club to ever become national champions.

As of 24 July 2012.

| Club | Nationals wins | Runner-up | Years |
|---|---|---|---|
| **Holy Cross** | 1 | 1 | 1988, 1989, |
| **St. Lawrence** | 0 | 3 | 1975, 1977, 2002 |

Bold indicates a current Challenge Cup team
Italics indicate a runner-up finish
