= Halifax City SC =

Halifax City
- Full name: Halifax City Soccer Club
- Founded: 2006 (Year of merger)
- Manager: Steve Lowndes
- League: Nova Scotia Soccer League
- 2011: NSSL Eastlink Premier Men, 2nd
Home colours	Away colours

Halifax City Soccer Club is a Canadian soccer club located in Halifax, Nova Scotia. It was founded in 2006 as a merger between Halifax City Wanderers and Halifax Celtic.

The club has a number of teams for different levels and ages, and for both male and female players. The senior Men's team is known, for sponsorships reasons, as Halifax City Cushman & Wakefield.

== Sponsors ==
- Coldwell Banker (2007)
- Elephant & Castle (2010)
- Cushman & Wakefield (2011)

== Achievements ==
- Canadian National Challenge Cup
  - 4th: 2007 (Matthew Budreski 3 goals and Ryan Haughn, Mark Sweetapple, Kristin Kirincich 1 goal each)
  - 6th: 2008, 2005 (as Coldwell Banker Celtic)
  - 7th: 2009
- Nova Scotia Soccer League Senior Men A
  - Champions: 2013, 2012, 2009, 2008, 2007
