= PEI FC =

Association football club in Prince Edward Island, Canada

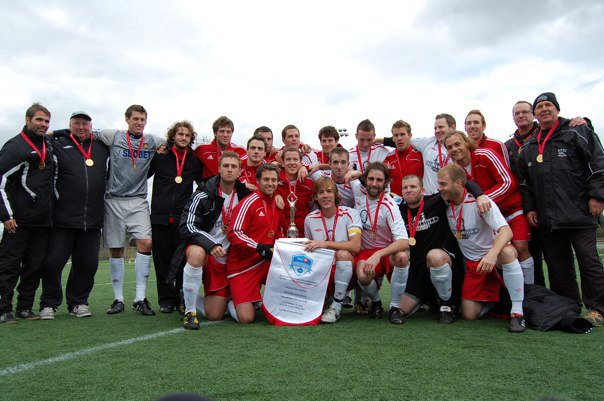
- Nickname: The Islanders
- Stadium: UPEI Sports Complex, Charlottetown, PEI
- Coach: Bruce Norton
- League: Nova Scotia Soccer League
- 2018: 1st
Home colours	Away colours

PEI FC, also known as Prince Edward Island Football Club, is a senior men's amateur soccer club from Charlottetown, PEI. The team is composed mainly of current and former UPEI Men's Soccer players. They were the 2008–2013 provincial representative for Prince Edward Island at the BMO Canadian National Soccer Championships and were the 2010 Challenge Cup champions.

== History ==
=== NSSL ===
From 2000 to 2007, the team was known as Breakers FC/VUFC.

In 2007 and 2008, the team played in the Nova Scotia Soccer League due to a lack of a premier league on Prince Edward Island. As Avondale Islanders, the team finished 3rd (2007) and 4th (2008) in the NSSL, did not compete in playoffs, and represented PEI at the BMO National Championships. In 2008, the Islanders defeated Nova Scotia representative Halifax City in a shootout to advance to the bronze medal game. Wayne Francis of Halifax City was stopped by Tim Kalinowski to send them to victory. Avondale then won the club's first national medal with a 3–2 victory over BC's Gorge FC.

=== MSSL ===
In 2009, there was a move away from the Nova Scotia Soccer League due to travel concerns between provinces. The team joined with Moncton and Fredericton Picaroons Reds to form a Maritime Senior Soccer League. In its inaugural season, the PEI and NB Canada Games teams also entered the league to gain experience for the 2009 Canada Games. The Islanders again represented PEI at the national championships, winning their second bronze medal in as many seasons with a shootout win over the defending national champion, Calgary Callies. The score was 0–0 at the end of regulation and overtime.

=== National Championship ===
In 2010, the Maritime League folded and the Islanders were left to play an exhibition schedule and league games versus the PEI Selects. The PEI Selects team had been created because New Brunswick was not able to send a representative to the 2010 BMO Nationals, thus Prince Edward Island (as host) had the right to send a second team. The PEISA scheduled a 2-game series to determine the "representative" team and the "host" team. The series was played on 22 and 25 August 2010. Churchill Arms defeated PEI Selects (later named Hunter's Ale House) 2–1 in the first match and 1–0 in the second match. Josh Vessey scored the winning goal in both Challenge Cup matches.

At the BMO Canadian National Soccer Championship tournament, third-ranked Churchill Arms was in Group B with (2)Royal Select Beauport from Quebec, (5)Holy Cross/Kirby from Newfoundland & Labrador, (6)Halifax Dunbrack from Nova Scotia, and the host (10)Hunter's Ale House. In the opening match, Michel Daoust came on as a substitute in the second half and scored two goals, both assisted by Ryan Anstey to lead Churchill to a 2–0 victory over Holy Cross. Matt Lally recorded the clean sheet after having to stop two half-breakaways in the first half. The Islanders continued strong the following day with a hard-fought 1–0 win over rival Halifax Dunbrack in windy conditions, placing the PEI team atop Group B with six points. Veteran midfielder Brett Norton headed home a perfectly placed Ken Morrison free-kick in the 11th minute, and solid play from the Churchill backline and keeper Matt Lally ensured the clean sheet. An uneventful scoreless draw with Royal Select from Quebec the following night left only provincial rivals Hunter's Ale House standing in the way of Churchill's first appearance in a national gold-medal match. Hunter's came prepared to play on a bitterly cold Sunday afternoon, but a second-half goal from Ryan Anstey sealed the victory and sent Churchill Arms to the national final. Keeper Andrew MacCormack recorded the clean sheet.

Churchill Arms FC finished the 2010 tournament by winning the first national championship in Prince Edward Island soccer history. The Islanders met strong Gorge FC squad from British Columbia in the final, the same club they had defeated in the 2008 bronze medal match in St. John's. Both teams were very strong defensively, and it was no surprise that, despite a few scattered scoring chances from both sides, the gold medal would be decided in overtime. The first fifteen-minute OT period saw some good possession from Churchill, but it was Gorge FC that almost had the go-ahead goal as Michel Daoust had to head a shot off Matt Lally's goal line to preserve the 0–0 score. As both teams seemed to be preparing for an upcoming shootout, fullback Graham Ashworth was able to break through the Gorge midfield and slide a through-ball to an on-running Brett Norton, who made no mistake in pushing the ball past the BC keeper to make it 1–0 for the PEI squad. As Gorge pushed to find an equalizer, Ryan Anstey was able to make a fast counter-attack and tuck home Churchill's second goal, ensuring a 2–0 (OT) victory for the Islanders. Team captain Jonathan Vos accepted The Challenge Trophy, and keepers Matt Lally and Andrew MacCormack shared the BMO Top Goal Saver award. Churchill Arms FC did not allow a single goal all tournament.

=== PEI Senior Men's Premier & NB Premier Soccer Leagues ===
PEI FC has competed in the New Brunswick Premier League since 2012. They finished the 2013 season in 3rd place.

== Team sponsors ==
- 2001–2007: Breakers/Velvet Underground (Charlottetown, PE)
- 2008–2009: Avondale Golf Club (Avondale, PE)
- 2010: Churchill Arms (Charlottetown, PE)
- 2011: Soccerstop (Charlottetown, PE)
- 2012: Soccerstop
- 2013: Soccerstop
- 2014: Soccerstop

== Year-by-year ==
Year	Division	Team name	League	Regular season	Playoffs	Nationals venue	Nationals
2001							n/a
2002	Senior amateur	Breakers	PEI Challenge Cup	2nd	Runner-up	St. John's, NL	n/a
2003	Senior amateur	Breakers	PEI Challenge Cup	1st	Champions	Quebec City, QC	8th
2004	Senior amateur	Velvet Underground FC	PEI Challenge Cup	1st	Champions	Charlottetown, PE	7th
2005	Senior amateur	Velvet Underground FC	PEI Challenge Cup	2nd	Runner-up	Calgary, AB	n/a
2006	Senior amateur	Velvet Underground FC	PEI Challenge Cup	1st	Champions	Surrey, BC	5th
2007	Senior amateur	Velvet Underground FC	NSSL	3rd	n/a	Halifax, NS	9th
2008	Senior amateur	Avondale Islanders	NSSL	4th	n/a	St. John's, NL	Bronze
2009	Senior amateur	Avondale Islanders	MSSL	1st	n/a	Saskatoon, SK	Bronze
2010	Senior amateur	Churchill Arms FC	PEI Challenge Cup	1st	Champions	Charlottetown, PE	Gold
2011	Senior amateur	Soccerstop Edge FC	PEI Challenge Cup	1st	Champions	Brossard, QC	8th
2012	Senior amateur	Soccerstop Edge/PEI FC	PEI Challenge Cup/NBPSL	1st/2nd	Champions	Winnipeg, MB	4th
2013	Senior amateur	PEI FC	PEI Challenge Cup/NBPSL	1st/3rd	Champions	Halifax, NS	9th

== Awards and honours ==
=== 2010 ===
BMO Challenge Cup Champions

Sport PEI Team of the Year (tie with Team PEI Women's Curling, silver medallists at the 2010 Scotties Tournament of Hearts – Kathy O'Rourke, Tricia Affleck, Erin Carmody and Geri-Lynn Ramsay)

Sport PEI Coach of the Year (John Diamond)

PEI Soccer Association Team of the Year

PEI Soccer Association Coach of the Year (John Diamond)

PEI Soccer Association Senior Male Player of the Year (Jonathan Vos)

=== 2009 ===
PEI Soccer Association Team of the Year (Avondale Islanders)

=== 2008 ===
Sport PEI Team of the Year (Avondale Islanders)

PEI Soccer Association Team of the Year (Avondale Islanders)

PEI Soccer Association Senior Male Player of the Year (Paul Craig)
