= St. Lawrence Laurentians =

Soccer club

The St. Lawrence Laurentians is a soccer club founded in 1904 and based in St. Lawrence, Newfoundland.

St. Lawrence is dubbed the "Soccer Capital of Canada" due to its success over the years. With a population of 1,350, the town has nine organized soccer teams. The senior men's team hold the record for most all-time Newfoundland Challenge Cup wins, with 29, including the competition's first season in 1967, and have represented their province numerous times at the Canadian National Challenge Cup (the winner of the Newfoundland Challenge Cup qualifies for the Canadian National Challenge Cup). The club also holds the record for most consecutive Newfoundland titles, with eight, between 1995 and 2002.

The main pitch, St. Lawrence Centennial Soccer Field, is a municipal heritage site. On that basis, it was added to the national Register of Historic Places in 2005.

Labatt's is the club sponsor, so the team is also known as the St. Lawrence Labatt Laurentians.

== Honours ==
- Newfoundland and Labrador Challenge Cup Champions (25): 1967-68, 1971–72, 1975–78, 1980, 1982, 1993, 1995-2002, 2005-08, 2013, 2016
- Canadian National Challenge Cup silver medalists: 1975, 1977, 2002
- Canadian National Challenge Cup bronze medalists: 1999, 2007

== Sources ==
- CBC's Soccer Day in Canada
