= 2006 PDL season =

USL Premier Development League
- Season: 2006
- Champions: Michigan Bucks (1st Title)
- Regular Season Champions: Carolina Dynamo (1st Title)
- Matches: 472
- Goals: 1,626 (3.44 per match)
- Best player: (Canada) Frederico Moojen Augusta Fireball
- Top goalscorer: (England) John Cunliffe Boulder Rapids Reserve, (Canada) Frederico Moojen Augusta Fireball (18 Goals Each)
- Best goalkeeper: (United States) Eric Reed Southern California Seahorses
- Longest winless run: California Gold Entire Season
- Longest losing run: California Gold Entire Season

The 2006 USL Premier Development League season was the 12th PDL season. The season began in April 2006 and ended in August 2006.

Michigan Bucks finished the season as national champions, beating Laredo Heat 2–1 in the PDL Championship game in Laredo, Texas on 12 August 2006.

Carolina Dynamo finished with the best regular season record in the league, winning 14 out of their 16 games, suffering no losses, and finishing with a +29 goal difference. Cape Cod Crusaders finished a very close second, tied with Dynamo on points and goal difference, but having scored two less goals.

Boulder Rapids Reserve striker John Cunliffe and Augusta Fireball forward Frederico Moojen were the league's top scorers, each knocking in 18 goals. Michigan Bucks's Nate Jafta led the league with 18 assists, while Southern California Seahorses keeper Eric Reed enjoyed the best goalkeeping statistics, with a goals-against average of 0.621 per game, and keeping 10 clean sheets in his 15 games.

== Changes from 2005 ==
=== New franchises ===
- Ten teams joined the league this year, including nine brand new franchises :

Team name	Metro area	Location	Previous affiliation
(Georgia (U.S. state)) Atlanta Silverbacks U23's	Atlanta area	Chamblee, Georgia	expansion
Delaware Dynasty	Wilmington area	New Castle, Delaware	expansion
(California) Los Angeles Storm	San Gabriel Valley area	Glendora, California	Previously Springfield Storm
Northern Virginia Royals	Northern Virginia area	Fairfax, Virginia	previously in USL-2
(Utah) Ogden Outlaws	Ogden area	Ogden, Utah	expansion
(California) San Fernando Valley Quakes	San Fernando Valley area	Los Angeles, California	expansion
(California) San Francisco Seals	San Francisco area	San Francisco, California	expansion
(Missouri) St. Louis Lions	St. Louis area	Cottleville, Missouri	expansion
(Washington (state)) Tacoma FC	Tacoma area	University Place, Washington	expansion
Virginia Beach Submariners	Virginia Beach area	Virginia Beach, Virginia	expansion

=== Folding ===
- Four teams left the league prior to the beginning of the season:
  - Memphis Express - Memphis, Tennessee
  - Nevada Wonders - Carson City, Nevada
  - Spokane Shadow - Spokane, Washington
  - Toledo Slayers - Toledo, Ohio

== Standings ==
Legend
Division champion
Team qualified for playoff berth

=== Central Conference ===
==== Great Lakes Division ====
Pos	Team	Pld	W	L	T	GF	GA	GD	Pts
1	Chicago Fire Premier	16	14	2	0	41	15	+26	42
2	Michigan Bucks	16	9	4	3	38	21	+17	30
3	Indiana Invaders	16	8	4	4	31	26	+5	28
4	Kalamazoo Kingdom	16	6	6	4	23	26	−3	22
5	West Michigan Edge	16	6	7	3	23	29	−6	21
6	Fort Wayne Fever	16	1	10	5	18	33	−15	8
7	Cleveland Internationals	16	1	12	3	14	45	−31	6

==== Heartland Division ====
Pos	Team	Pld	W	L	T	GF	GA	GD	Pts
1	Boulder Rapids Reserve	16	14	2	0	42	14	+28	42
2	Des Moines Menace	16	10	4	2	41	25	+16	32
3	Kansas City Brass	16	8	4	4	23	17	+6	28
4	St. Louis Lions	16	7	3	6	25	18	+7	27
5	Sioux Falls Spitfire	16	4	9	3	21	30	−9	15
6	Colorado Springs Blizzard	16	3	10	3	20	36	−16	12
7	Thunder Bay Chill	16	2	11	3	21	36	−15	9

=== Eastern Conference ===
==== Mid Atlantic Division ====
Pos	Team	Pld	W	L	T	GF	GA	GD	Pts
1	Virginia Beach Submariners	16	10	5	1	36	19	+17	31
2	Williamsburg Legacy	16	8	4	4	31	20	+11	28
3	West Virginia Chaos	16	6	7	3	26	33	−7	21
4	Northern Virginia Royals	16	6	10	0	21	41	−20	18
5	Richmond Kickers Future	16	4	9	3	23	31	−8	15

==== New England Division ====
Pos	Team	Pld	W	L	T	GF	GA	GD	Pts
1	Cape Cod Crusaders	16	14	0	2	39	10	+29	44
2	Ottawa Fury	16	7	6	3	25	24	+1	24
3	Rhode Island Stingrays	16	6	8	2	33	29	+4	20
4	Albany Admirals	16	4	9	3	12	24	−12	15
5	Vermont Voltage	16	3	9	4	16	36	−20	13

==== Northeast Division ====
Pos	Team	Pld	W	L	T	GF	GA	GD	Pts
1	Westchester Flames	16	10	5	1	37	27	+10	31
2	Ocean City Barons	16	6	4	6	31	20	+11	24
3	Reading Rage	16	6	8	2	21	32	−11	20
4	Delaware Dynasty	16	5	9	2	26	36	−10	17
5	Brooklyn Knights	16	4	10	2	21	29	−8	14

=== Southern Conference ===
==== Mid South Division ====
Pos	Team	Pld	W	L	T	GF	GA	GD	Pts
1	Laredo Heat	16	14	2	0	38	19	+19	42
2	DFW Tornados	16	8	7	1	25	21	+4	25
3	El Paso Patriots	16	7	7	2	28	18	+10	23
4	New Orleans Shell Shockers	16	4	11	1	22	33	−11	13
5	Austin Lightning	16	3	11	2	19	45	−26	11

==== South Atlantic Division ====
Pos	Team	Pld	W	L	T	GF	GA	GD	Pts
1	Carolina Dynamo (R)	16	14	0	2	41	12	+29	44
2	Augusta Fireball	16	9	3	4	31	18	+13	31
3	Atlanta Silverbacks U23's	16	6	7	3	26	33	−7	21
4	Raleigh Elite	16	4	7	5	29	32	−3	17
5	Nashville Metros	16	3	8	5	24	35	−11	14

(R) Regular Season Champions

==== Southeast Division ====
Pos	Team	Pld	W	L	T	GF	GA	GD	Pts
1	Bradenton Academics	16	11	4	1	44	28	+16	34
2	Central Florida Kraze	16	7	7	2	24	28	−4	23
3	Palm Beach Pumas	16	6	8	2	26	37	−11	20
4	Cocoa Expos	16	5	6	5	39	35	+4	20
5	Ajax Orlando Prospects	16	2	12	2	22	38	−16	8

=== Western Conference ===
==== Northwest Division ====
Pos	Team	Pld	W	L	T	GF	GA	GD	Pts
1	Abbotsford Rangers	16	9	4	3	31	17	+14	30
2	BYU Cougars	16	9	6	1	22	15	+7	28
3	Yakima Reds	16	7	7	2	28	24	+4	23
4	Ogden Outlaws	16	5	9	2	21	25	−4	17
5	Tacoma FC	16	4	8	4	21	26	−5	16
6	Cascade Surge	16	3	11	2	14	44	−30	11

==== Southwest Division ====
Pos	Team	Pld	W	L	T	GF	GA	GD	Pts
1	Southern California Seahorses	16	13	3	0	34	9	+25	39
2	Orange County Blue Star	16	10	4	2	32	23	+9	32
3	San Fernando Valley Quakes	16	10	5	1	35	28	+7	31
4	San Francisco Seals	16	7	5	4	32	22	+10	25
5	Fresno Fuego	16	7	7	2	46	31	+15	23
6	Bakersfield Brigade	16	7	8	1	31	29	+2	22
7	Los Angeles Storm	16	6	6	4	24	21	+3	22
8	San Diego Gauchos	16	6	9	1	25	31	−6	19
9	California Gold	16	0	16	0	13	71	−58	0

== Playoffs ==
=== Bracket ===
Conference Semifinals
NWE	(Massachusetts) Cape Cod Crusaders	3
WC	(Virginia) Williamsburg Legacy	0
Eastern Conference
MA	Virginia Beach Submariners	1
NE	(New York (state)) Westchester Flames	3
SA	(North Carolina) Carolina Dynamo	0
SE	(Florida) Bradenton Academics (OT)	1
Southern Conference
MS	(Texas) Laredo Heat	3
WC	(Georgia (U.S. state)) Augusta FireBall	2
HL1	(Colorado) Boulder Rapids Reserve	0
GL2	Michigan Bucks	4
Central Conference
GL1	(Illinois) Chicago Fire Premier (PSO)	3 (5)
HL2	(Iowa) Des Moines Menace	3 (3)
SW1	Southern California Seahorses	1
NW2	(Utah) BYU Cougars	2
Western Conference
NW1	(British Columbia) Abbotsford Rangers	2
SW2	(California) Orange County Blue Star	3

Conference Finals
NWE	(Massachusetts) Cape Cod Crusaders	1
NE	(New York (state)) Westchester Flames	2
SE	(Florida) Bradenton Academics	1
MS	(Texas) Laredo Heat	2
GL2	Michigan Bucks	4
GL1	(Illinois) Chicago Fire Premier	1
NW2	(Utah) BYU Cougars	2 (2)
SW2	(California) Orange County Blue Star (PSO)	2 (4)

National Semifinals
NE	(New York (state)) Westchester Flames	2
MS	(Texas) Laredo Heat	3
GL2	Michigan Bucks	2
SW2	(California) Orange County Blue Star	0

PDL Championship Game
MS	(Texas) Laredo Heat	1
GL2	Michigan Bucks	2

=== Conference semifinals ===
July 28, 2006
5:30 PM ET

(Massachusetts) Cape Cod Crusaders	3 – 0	(Virginia) Williamsburg Legacy
Chavez (yellow card) 48'; Bulow 70' 75' (PK); O'Reilly 90'	(Report)	Monroe (yellow card) 33'

Virginia Beach Sportsplex
Virginia Beach, Virginia
Referee: Chuck Watts (USA)

July 28, 2006
5:30 PM ET

(Texas) Laredo Heat	3 – 2	(Georgia (U.S. state)) Augusta FireBall
Almack 38'; Presas 75' 87'	(Report)	Charowski 52'; Irizarry 90+'

Macpherson Stadium
Browns Summit, North Carolina
Attendance: 1,300
Referee: (USA)

July 28, 2006
7:00 PM ET

(Colorado) Boulder Rapids Reserve	0 – 4	Michigan Bucks
Christensen (yellow card) 23'; Seager (red card) 63'	(Report)	Uzoigwe 18'; Jafta 32'; Traylor (yellow card) 37'; Holody 43'; Dube 71'

Waukee Stadium
Waukee, Iowa
Referee: (USA)

July 28, 2006
7:30 PM ET

(California) Orange County Blue Star	3 – 2	(British Columbia) Abbotsford Rangers
Hamilton 53'; Rivera (yellow card) 62'; Larrabee 70'; Lopez 84'	(Report)	Peetoom 37'; Wilson 44'; Riehl (yellow card) 46'

South Stadium
Provo, Utah
Referee: (USA)

July 28, 2006
8:00 PM ET

Virginia Beach Submariners	1 – 3	(New York (state)) Westchester Flames
Gilkerson (yellow card) 45'; Templeman (yellow card) 48'; Haywood 64'	(Report)	Shapiro 15' 20'; Davies 32'; Trott (yellow card) 54'

Virginia Beach Sportsplex
Virginia Beach, Virginia
Attendance: 550
Referee: James Conlee (USA)

July 28, 2006
8:00 PM ET

(North Carolina) Carolina Dynamo	0 – 1 (AET)	(Florida) Bradenton Academics
	(Report)	Dallman 115'

Macpherson Stadium
Browns Summit, North Carolina
Referee: (USA)

July 28, 2006
9:30 PM ET

(Iowa) Des Moines Menace	3 – 3 (AET)	(Illinois) Chicago Fire Premier
Boltnar 62' 111'; Oliveira (red card) 66'; Hamburger (yellow card) 73'; Moffat (yellow card) 97'; Kother 113'	(Report)	Guzmán (yellow card) 29'; Bush (yellow card) 60'; Anderson 73'; North 93' 108'; Ubiparipović (yellow card) 101'
Penalties
Munns (penalty missed); Boltnar (penalty scored); Kariotis (penalty scored); Dombrowski (penalty scored)	3 – 5	(penalty scored) Ubiparipović; (penalty scored) DiRaimondo; (penalty scored) Guzmán; (penalty scored) Hlavaty; (penalty scored) Anderson

Waukee Stadium
Waukee, Iowa
Attendance: 1,453
Referee: Dan Cataldi (USA)

July 28, 2006
10:00 PM ET

(Utah) BYU Cougars	2 – 1	Southern California Seahorses
Clark 37'; A. Van Wagenen (yellow card) 45'; Norton (yellow card) 58'; Cavanaugh 61'; H. Van Wagenen (yellow card) 64'	(Report)	Hansen (yellow card) 14' (goal) 45' (PK); Jepson (yellow card) 40'; Young (yellow card) 53'

South Stadium
Provo, Utah
Attendance: 444
Referee: (USA)

=== Conference finals ===
July 29, 2006
5:00 PM ET

(Massachusetts) Cape Cod Crusaders	1 – 2	(New York (state)) Westchester Flames
Britcher 84'	(Report)	Meyer 71'; Davies 86'

Virginia Beach Sportsplex
Virginia Beach, Virginia
Referee: (USA)

July 29, 2006
7:30 PM ET

(Texas) Laredo Heat	2 – 1	(Florida) Bradenton Academics
Macias (yellow card) 29'; Almack (yellow card) 31'; Sanchez 41'; Galvan (yellow card) 67'; Infante 89'	(Report)	Collings (yellow card) 18'; Bello 39' (yellow card) 75'

Macpherson Stadium
Browns Summit, North Carolina
Attendance: 120
Referee: Charles Mitchell (USA)

July 29, 2006
8:30 PM ET

(Illinois) Chicago Fire Premier	1 – 4	Michigan Bucks
Bode 24'; Guzmán (yellow card) 30'; DeGurian (yellow card) 59' (yellow-red card) 72'	(Report)	Turpin (yellow card) 20' (goal) 34'; Jafta 27' 62' 66'; Uzoigwe (yellow card) 45'

Waukee Stadium
Waukee, Iowa
Attendance: 238
Referee: Doug Jotzke (USA)

July 29, 2006
9:30 PM ET

(Utah) BYU Cougars	2 – 2 (AET)	(California) Orange County Blue Star
Marshall 86'; Norton 90'	(Report)	Marion 26' (yellow card) 72'; Evans 41'; Lopez (yellow card) 43'; Shager (yellow card) 78'; Kljestan (red card) 94'
Penalties
Winn (penalty missed); Trejo (penalty scored); Gilliam (penalty scored); Osborne (penalty missed)	2 – 4	(penalty scored) Theslof; (penalty scored) Larrabee; (penalty scored) Higgins; (penalty scored) Valdez

South Stadium
Provo, Utah
Attendance: 555
Referee: (USA)

=== National semifinals ===
August 5, 2006
7:30 PM ET

Michigan Bucks	2 – 0	(California) Orange County Blue Star
Uzoigwe 45' 48'; Holody (yellow card) 62'	(Report)	Saunders (yellow card) 2'; Valdez (yellow card) 29'; Higgins (yellow card) 46'

Stoney Creek High School
Rochester Hills, Michigan
Attendance: 826
Referee: Marc Lawrence (USA)

August 5, 2006
9:05 PM ET

(Texas) Laredo Heat	3 – 2	(New York (state)) Westchester Flames
Galvan 40'; Ibarra 42' (PK); Infante 90' (yellow card) 90'	(Report)	Davies 15' (PK); Shapiro 34'

UISD Student Activity Center
Laredo, Texas
Attendance: 2,470
Referee: Michael Brow (USA)

=== National final ===
August 12, 2006
9:35 PM ET

(Texas) Laredo Heat	1 – 2	Michigan Bucks
Macias 17' (yellow card) 17'; Galvan (yellow card) 78'; Sanchez (yellow card) 87'	(Report)	Uzoigwe 4' (yellow card) 56'; Shipalane 8'

UISD Student Activity Center
Laredo, Texas
Attendance: 7,000
Referee: Fernando Galvan (USA)

Championship MVP: (United States) Kenny Uzoigwe (MIB)

== Awards ==
=== Year End Awards ===
Scoring Champion: (England) John Cunliffe (Boulder Rapids Reserve) 41 Points (15 Goals, 5 Assists)
Golden Boot: (England) John Cunliffe (Boulder Rapids Reserve)
(Canada) Frederico Moojen (Augusta Fireball) (15 Goals Each)
Assists Champion: (South Africa) Nate Jafta (Michigan Bucks) (11 Assists)
GAA Champion: (United States) Eric Reed (Southern California Seahorses) 0.62 Goals Against
MVP: (Canada) Frederico Moojen (Augusta Fireball)
U19 Player of the Year: (United States) PJ Wilson (Fort Wayne Fever)
Defender of the Year: (Trinidad and Tobago) Osei Telesford (Carolina Dynamo)
Goalkeeper of the Year: (United States) Eric Reed (Southern California Seahorses)
Coach of the Year: (United States) Joe Brown (Carolina Dynamo)

=== Weekly awards ===
Player of the Week
Week	Player	Club	Position	Reason	Ref.
3	(England) Ben Hunter	Carolina Dynamo	Forward	3 goals, 2 assists in 6–1 win over Nashville Metros	
4	(United States) Taylor Rowe	Williamsburg Legacy	Defender	2 goals in win at Reading Rage	
5	(United States) Kenny Uzoigwe	Michigan Bucks	Forward	Hat-trick as sub in 4-1 win over Fort Wayne Fever	
6	(England) Ron Murphy	Cape Cod Crusaders	Forward	Hat-trick in 3-2 win at Rhode Island Stingrays	
7	(Poland) David Badecki	Rhode Island Stingrays	Midfielder	Hat-trick in 7-2 win over Delaware Dynasty	
8	(United States) Kenneth Hickman	Ogden Outlaws	Forward	3 goals, 1 assist in win and draw	
9	(Canada) Frederico Moojen	Augusta Fireball	Forward	3 goals, 1 assist in pair of wins	
10	(United States) Will Guadarrama	Raleigh Elite	Forward	2 hat-tricks, 2 assists in win and draw	
11	(England) John Cunliffe	Boulder Rapids Reserves	Forward	Hat-trick, assist in 5–2 win over Western Mass Pioneers	
12	(United States) Hunter West	Bradenton Academics	Midfielder	3 goals, 1 assist in pair of wins	
13	(Canada) Kevin Omokhua	Ottawa Fury	Forward	4 goals in pair of 2-1 road wins	
14	(Canada) Sean Crocker	Abbotsford Rangers	Midfielder	4 goals in pair of wins	

Team of the Week
Week	Goalkeeper	Defenders	Midfielders	Forwards	Ref.
3	(United States) Pollack (WES)	(United States) Parker (PBP) (United States) Foster (YAK) (United States) Sherard (RAL) (United States) Gookins (BAK)	(United States) Sanchez (LAR) (United States) Gutierrez (FRE) (United States) Barber (CFK)	(England) Hunter (CAR) (United States) Davies (WES) (Peru) Colan (SFS)	
4	(United States) Lacey (BYU)	(United States) Rowe (WIL) (Canada) Lang (ABB) (United States) White (KCB) (England) Howarth (RI)	(Kenya) Olum (STL) (United States) Theslof (OC) (United States) S. Guadarrama (AUS)	(United States) Perkins (IND) (Trinidad and Tobago) Roberts (CAR) (United States) Priestly (ATL)	
5	(United States) Saccoccio (SDG)	(United States) Pessina (ATL) (Trinidad and Tobago) Johnson (KAL) (United States) Jepson (SCS) (United States) Horst (VBS)	(Scotland) McGuire (CCC) (United States) Altcheck (WES) (United States) Warman (KCB)	(United States) Uzoigwe (MIC) (Canada) Moojen (AUG) (United States) Bardales (SDG)	
6	(United States) Shaugnessy (LAR)	(United States) Lambert (NO) (United States) Horst (VBS) (United States) Hickman (ODG) (United States) Holody (MIC)	(United States) Savage (CFK) (United States) Tudela (KAL) (United States) Trejo (BYU)	(United States) Anderson (CHI) (United States) Lesmes (ELP) (England) Murphy (CCC)	
7	(United States) Schroeder (KCB)	(United States) Goonin (WIL) (Jamaica) Walters (ATL) (United States) Quinones (LAR) (United States) Schuler (CHI)	(Scotland) Lilly (WVC) (Poland) Badecki (RIS) (United States) Muckey (FWF) (United States) Spencer (TAC)	(England) Cunliffe (BRR) (United States) Martin (BAK)	
8	(Republic of Ireland) Guppy (SFV)	(United States) Lambert (NO) (United States) Eisenbraun (BRR) (United States) Tait (OCB) (United States) Woolard (DFW)	(Kenya) Olum (STL) (United States) Lopez (OC) (Canada) Omokhua (OTT)	(United States) Boggs (BRD) (United States) Hickman (ODG) (Trinidad and Tobago) Patterson (CAR)	
9	(United States) Myers (SDG)	(United States) Howard (KCB) (United States) Rice (MIC) (Trinidad and Tobago) Telesford (CAR)	(Brazil) Codeceira (FRE) (United States) Winn (BYU) (Mexico) Ibarra (LAR) (Canada) Guzman (MIC)	(England) Cunliffe (BRR) (United States) Bulow (CCC) (Canada) Moojen (AUG)	
10	(United States) Levey (CCC)	(United States) Foster (YAK) (United States) Gray (REA) (United States) Eisenbraun (BRR) (United States) Woolard (DFW)	(United States) Elcock (VBS) (Kenya) Olum (STL) (United States) Drummond (ATL)	(United States) W. Guadarrama (RAL) (United States) Boggs (BRD) (United States) Guerrero (SDG)	
11	(United States) Forrest (STL)	(United States) Gilliam (BYU) (Antigua and Barbuda) Merrick (STL) (Argentina) Papandrea (AUS)	(United States) Su (LAR) (United States) Elcock (VBS) (South Africa) Borman (RIS) (United States) Pierce (CCC)	(United States) Anderson (CHI) (England) Cunliffe (BRR) (Brazil) De Souza (TBC)	
12	(United States) Bush (CHI)	(United States) Christensen (BRR) (United States) McMahon (KAL) (United States) Tierney (STL)	(United States) Hamburger (DMM) (Brazil) Codeceira (FRE) (Lebanon) Karanouh (OTT) (United States) West (BRD)	(United States) Schramm (CCC) (Mexico) Frías (ELP) (United States) Agu (TAC)	
13	(United States) Lovitz (VER)	(Trinidad and Tobago) Telesford (CAR) (Mexico) Ordáz (LAR) (United States) Holody (MIC)	(United States) Mariani (YAK) (United States) Bello (BRD) (Scotland) McGuire (CCC) (England) Bradford (SFS)	(Canada) Omokhua (OTT) (England) Cunliffe (BRR) (United States) Uzoigwe (MIC)	
14	(United States) Levey (CCC)	(Canada) DiLorenzo (OTT) (United States) Tierney (STL) (United States) Alden-Dunn (BRD)	(United States) Boukhemis (WVC) (Canada) Crocker (ABB) (Brazil) Guarda (DFW) (United States) Bartulovic (CLE)	(Puerto Rico) Hansen (SCS) (Zimbabwe) Dube (MIC) (United States) Hoxie (WIL)	

== All-League and All- Conference Teams ==
=== All-League Team ===
F: (England) John Cunliffe (BRR) (Scoring Champion and Co Golden Boot), (Canada) Frederico Moojen (AUG) (League MVP and Co Golden Boot), (Trinidad and Tobago) Randi Patterson (CAR)
M: (United States) Hunter West (BRD), (South Africa) Nate Jafta (MIC), (Czech Republic) Tomas Boltnar (DMM), (United States) Brock Trejo (BYU)
D: (Trinidad and Tobago) Osei Telesford (CAR) (Defender of the Year), (United States) David Horst (VBS), (England) Mike Mitchinson (CCC)
G: (United States) Eric Reed (SCS) (Goalkeeper of the Year and GAA Champion)

=== Central Conference ===
F: (England) John Cunliffe (BRR)*, (United States) Jake Stacy (WME), (United States) Kenny Uzoigwe (MIC)
M: (Czech Republic) Tomas Boltnar (DMM)*, (South Africa) Nate Jafta (MIC)*, (United States) Josh Tudela (KAL), (Bosnia and Herzegovina) Siniša Ubiparipović (CHI)
D: (Antigua and Barbuda) Deno Merrick (STL), (Brazil) Danilo Oliveiraa (DMM), (Trinidad and Tobago) Serginho Sandy (IND)
G: (United States) Evan Bush (CHI)

=== Eastern Conference ===
F: (United States) David Bulow (CCC), (United States) Byron Carmichael (OCB), (Canada) Kevin Omokhua (OTT)
M: (United States) Geoffrey Cameron (RIS), (United States) Jared Kent (VBS), (England) Matt Lacey (RIC), (United States) Frederick Schramm (WES)
D: (United States) David Horst (VBS)*, (England) Mike Mitchinson (CCC)*, (Scotland) Graham Munro (CCC),
G: (United States) Brian Levey (CCC)

=== Southern Conference ===
F: (England) Ben Hunter (CAR), (Canada) Frederico Moojen (AUG)*, (Trinidad and Tobago) Randi Patterson (CAR)*
M: (United States) John Drummond (ATL), (United States) Wells Thompson (CAR), (United States) Hunter West (BRD)*
D: (United States) Darrius Barnes (RAL), (Mexico) Hugo Samano (ELP), (United States) Anthony Santiago (CFK), (Trinidad and Tobago) Osei Telesford (CAR)*
G: (United States) Ryan Shaughnessy (LAR)

=== Western Conference ===
F: (United States) Anthony Hamilton (OC), (United States) Chris Sardon (YAK), (Canada) Cameron Wilson (ABB)
M: (Brazil) Fabricio Codeceira (FRE), (United States) Lyle Martin (BAK), (United States) JT Searles (SCS), (United States) Brock Trejo (BYU)*
D: (Canada) James Giebelhaus (ABB), (England) Anthony Griffiths (CAS), (Uganda) Ken Ojuka (BYU)
G: (United States) Eric Reid (SCS)*

* denotes All-League and all Conference Teams

== See also ==
- United Soccer Leagues 2006
