= First overall pick =

First overall pick may refer to:

- List of first overall CFL draft picks
- List of first overall KHL draft picks
- List of first overall MLS draft picks
- List of first overall Major League Baseball draft picks
- List of first overall NASL draft picks
- List of first overall NBA draft picks
  - List of first overall NBA G League draft picks
- List of first overall NFL draft picks
- List of first overall NHL draft picks
- List of first overall NWSL draft picks
- List of first overall PWHL draft picks
- List of first overall WNBA draft picks
