= Patriots Park =

Patriots Park may refer to:

- Patriots Park (Bakersfield), a public park in Bakersfield, California
- Patriots Park (Columbia County, Georgia), a multi-purpose recreational facility
- Patriot's Park, Westchester County, New York
- Patriots Park (Allentown), a softball field in Allentown, Pennsylvania
