= Augusta FireBall =

American soccer team from Augusta, Georgia

- Full name: Augusta FireBall United
- Nickname: The Fire
- Founded: 2005
- Ground: Patriots Park
- Capacity: ????
- Chairman: Brad Usry
- Manager: Alec Papadakis
- League: USL Premier Development League
- 2006: 2nd, South Atlantic Division; Playoff Conference Semifinals
Home colours	Away colours

Augusta FireBall United, more commonly known as simply Augusta FireBall, was the American soccer team from Augusta, Georgia, founded in 2005. The team was a member of the United Soccer Leagues Premier Development League (PDL), the fourth tier of the American Soccer Pyramid, until 2006, when the team left the league and the franchise was terminated.

The team played its home games at Patriots Park in Columbia County, Georgia. The team's colors were white, black and red.

== Final Squad ==
vs Laredo Heat, 28 July 2006 Note: Flags indicate national team as defined under FIFA eligibility rules; some limited exceptions apply. Players may hold more than one non-FIFA nationality.

No.	Pos.	Nation	Player
1	GK	USA	Justin Papadakis
3	MF	USA	Karl Dix
6	FW	MEX	Hector Quinta
8	DF	USA	Kyle Helton
9	FW	BRA	Frederico Moojen
11	MF	USA	Ryan Roushandel
12	MF	USA	Tomek Charowski

No.	Pos.	Nation	Player
13	MF	USA	Mark Buchholz
14	MF	CRC	Sergio Sanchez
15	DF	USA	Brad Usry
16	MF	USA	David Mueller
17	MF	PUR	Danny Irizarry
21	DF	USA	Jonathan Leathers
23	DF	USA	Tate Parrish

== Year-by-year ==
Year	Division	League	Regular season	Playoffs	Open Cup
2005	4	USL PDL	4th, Mid Atlantic	Did not qualify	Did not qualify
2006	4	USL PDL	2nd, South Atlantic	Conference Semifinals	Did not qualify

== Competition history ==
Augusta Fireball joined the PDL in 2005 as an expansion franchise, and made an immediate splash in the Mid Atlantic division. The team won four of its first five games in competition, including a dominant 6–0 take down of West Virginia Chaos in which Jason McLaughlin and Mark Buchholz scored two goals each, in just their fifth competitive game. Stadium issues meant that Fireball had to play all their home games at the start of the season, and spend the second half of the year on the road; unfortunately, this curious schedule meant that Fireball suffered during the second half of the season, losing heavily on the road to Raleigh Elite, Central Florida Kraze and Carolina Dynamo, although they did come out on top in an astonishing nine-goal thriller against West Virginia Chaos. The team's final day 3–1 loss to the DFW Tornados meant that the Fireball finished their first season fourth behind Richmond Kickers Future, just out of the playoffs. Jason McLaughlin and Ryan Roushandel were the team's joint top scorers, with 7 goals each.

Fireball started 2006 superbly, with an 8-game unbeaten run that included impressive victories, including a 3–2 come-from-behind win over Ajax Orlando Prospects in which Frederico Moojen scored a hat trick, a 4–2 victory on the road over Nashville Metros, and a comprehensive 3–0 win over Atlanta Silverbacks U23's in which Moojen scored another brace. In fact, it was the goalscoring prowess of Moojen which kept Fireball winning all season long. He scored two more goals in Augusta's 3–0 win over Atlanta in the return fixture in early July, and eventually finished the season as the top scorer in the entire PDL, with 18 goals, and was named overall PDL MVP. Despite a 1–0 loss to Carolina Dynamo on the last day of the regular season – only their third of the year – Fireball finished second in the South Atlantic Division, and qualified for the playoffs; their opponents in the Conference semi-finals were Mid South Division champions Laredo Heat, who eventually ran out 3–2 winners, and went on to reach the championship game.

At the end of the season, and despite their considerable on-field success, Augusta's management team announced that they would not be competing in the PDL in 2007.

== Coaches ==
- (United States) Massoud Roushandel 2005
- (United States) Alec Papadakis 2006

== Stadia ==
- Patriots Park, Columbia County, Georgia 2005–06

== Average attendance ==
- 2006: 424
- 2005: 600
