= City Park Stadium =

Soccer stadium in New Rochelle, New York, US

Coordinates: 40.930314°N 73.773722°W

City Park Stadium is a soccer specific-stadium located in New Rochelle, New York. The official name of the stadium is "Skidelsky Field at City Park Stadium". Its main tenant is the Westchester Flames FC soccer club who play in USL League Two, the fourth tier of American soccer. The team plays in the league's Northeast Division. The stadium's capacity is 1,845.
