= List of first overall MLS draft picks =

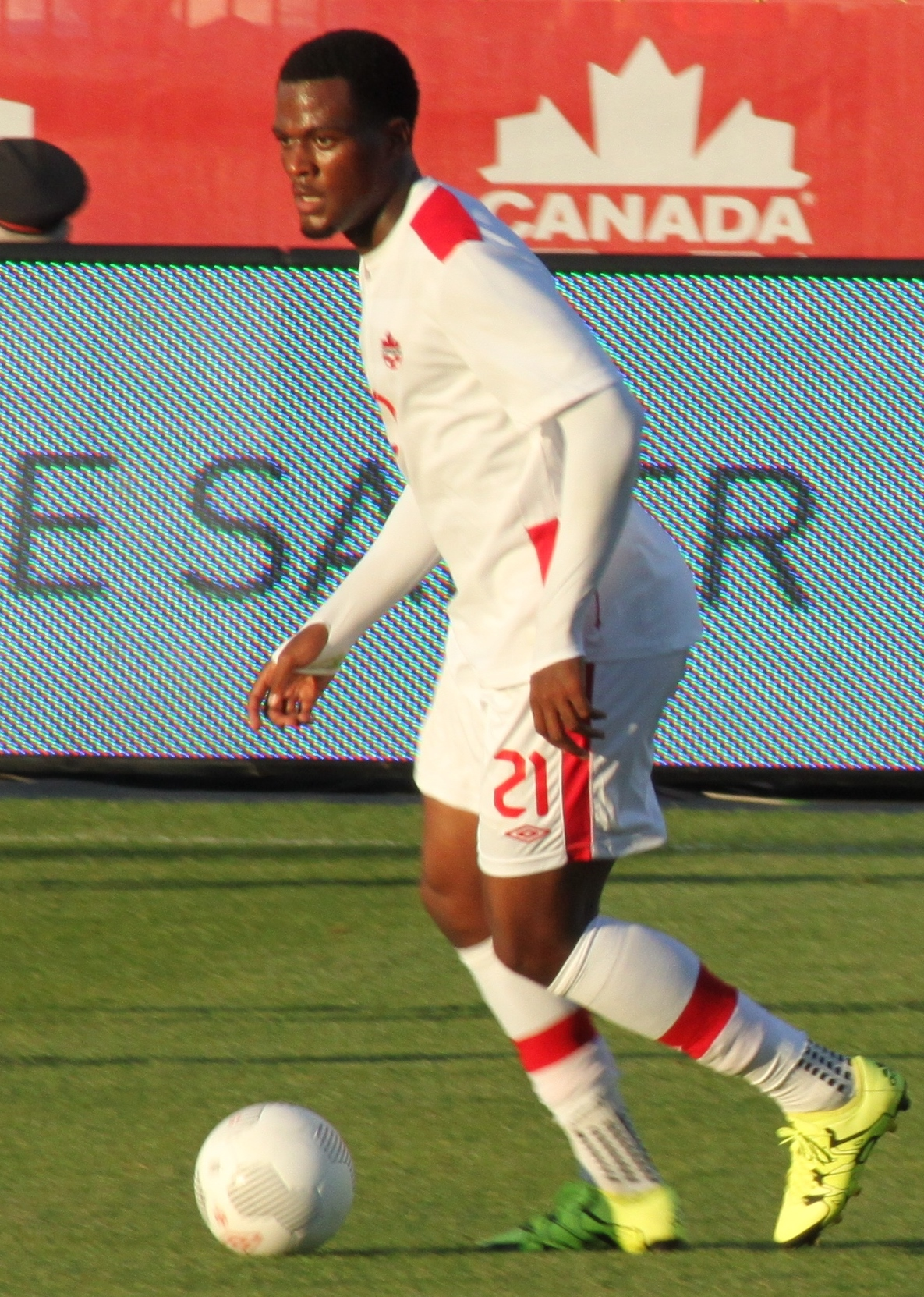
Cyle Larin, drafted out of the University of Connecticut, won the Rookie of the Year award as a first overall draft pick.

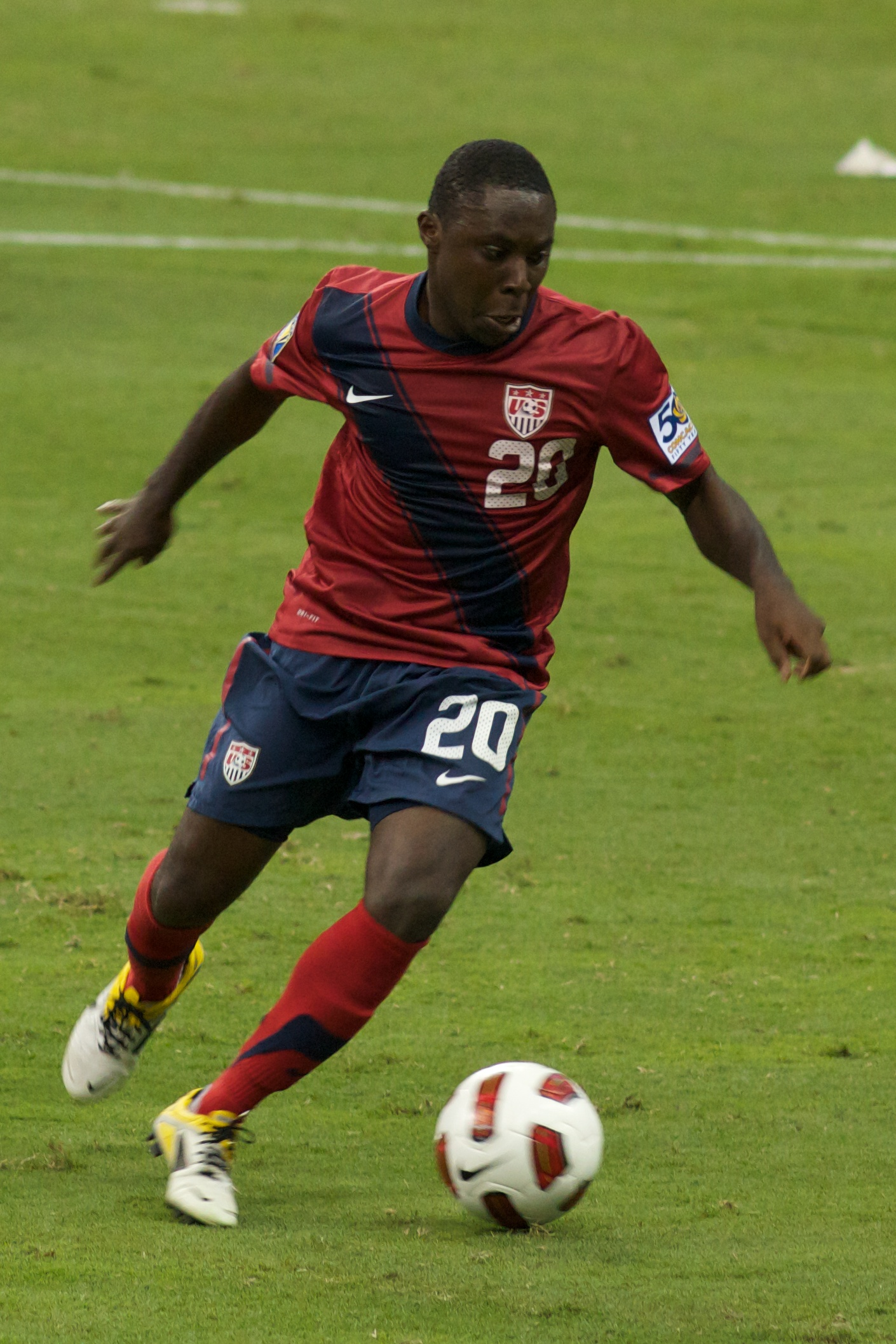
Freddy Adu, was the first overall draft pick in 2004.

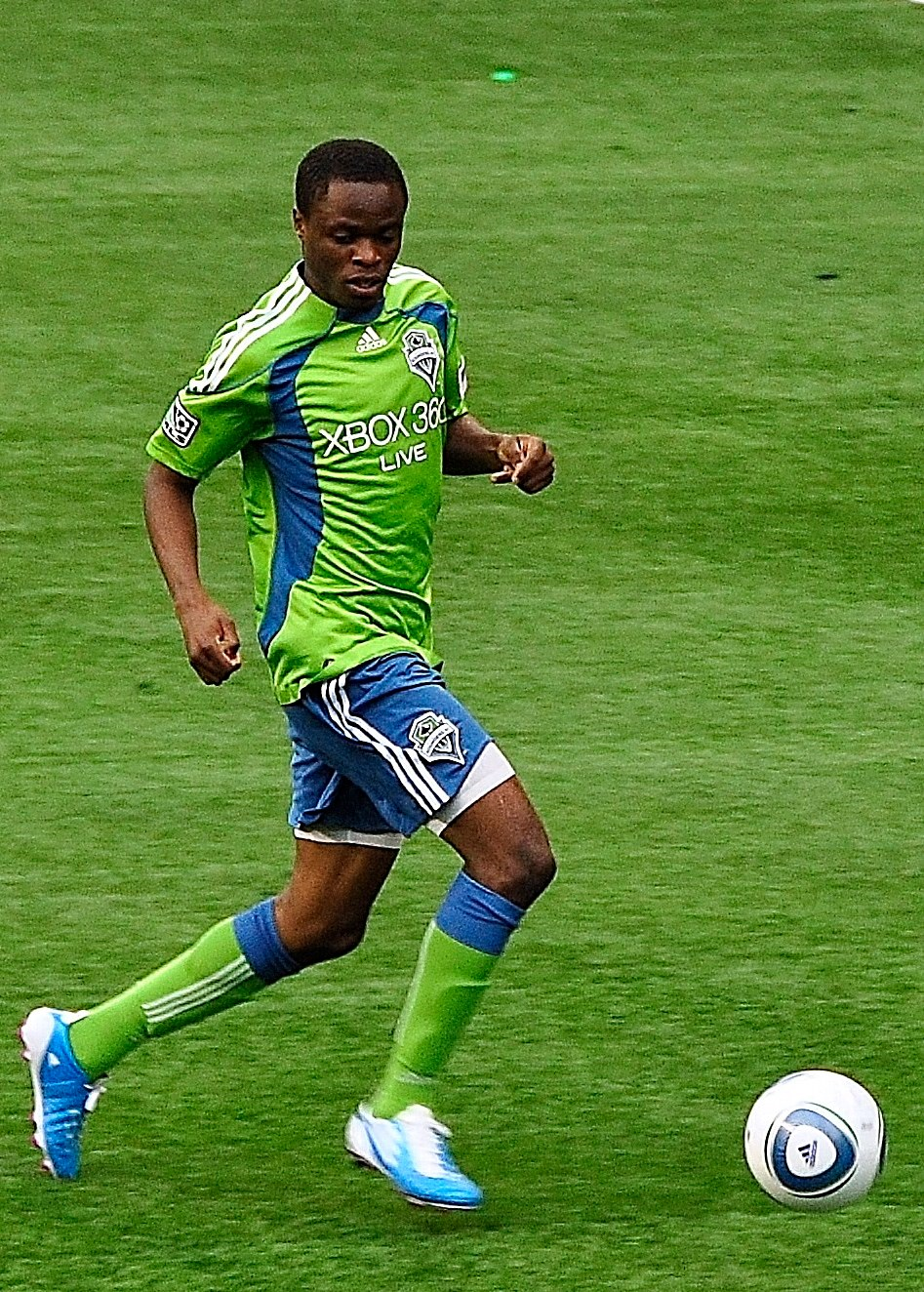
Steve Zakuani, was the first overall draft pick in 2009.

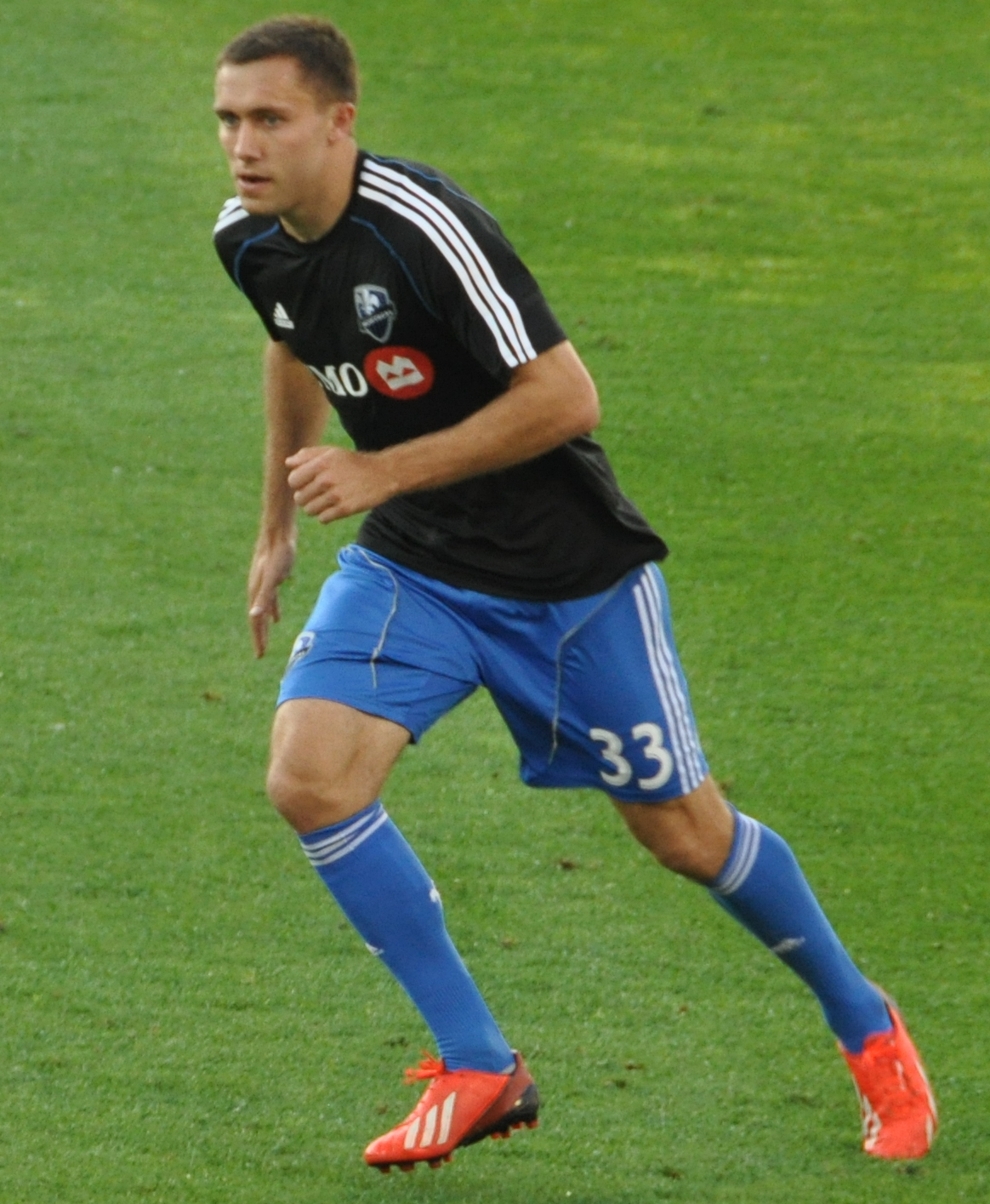
Andrew Wenger, was the first overall draft pick in 2012.

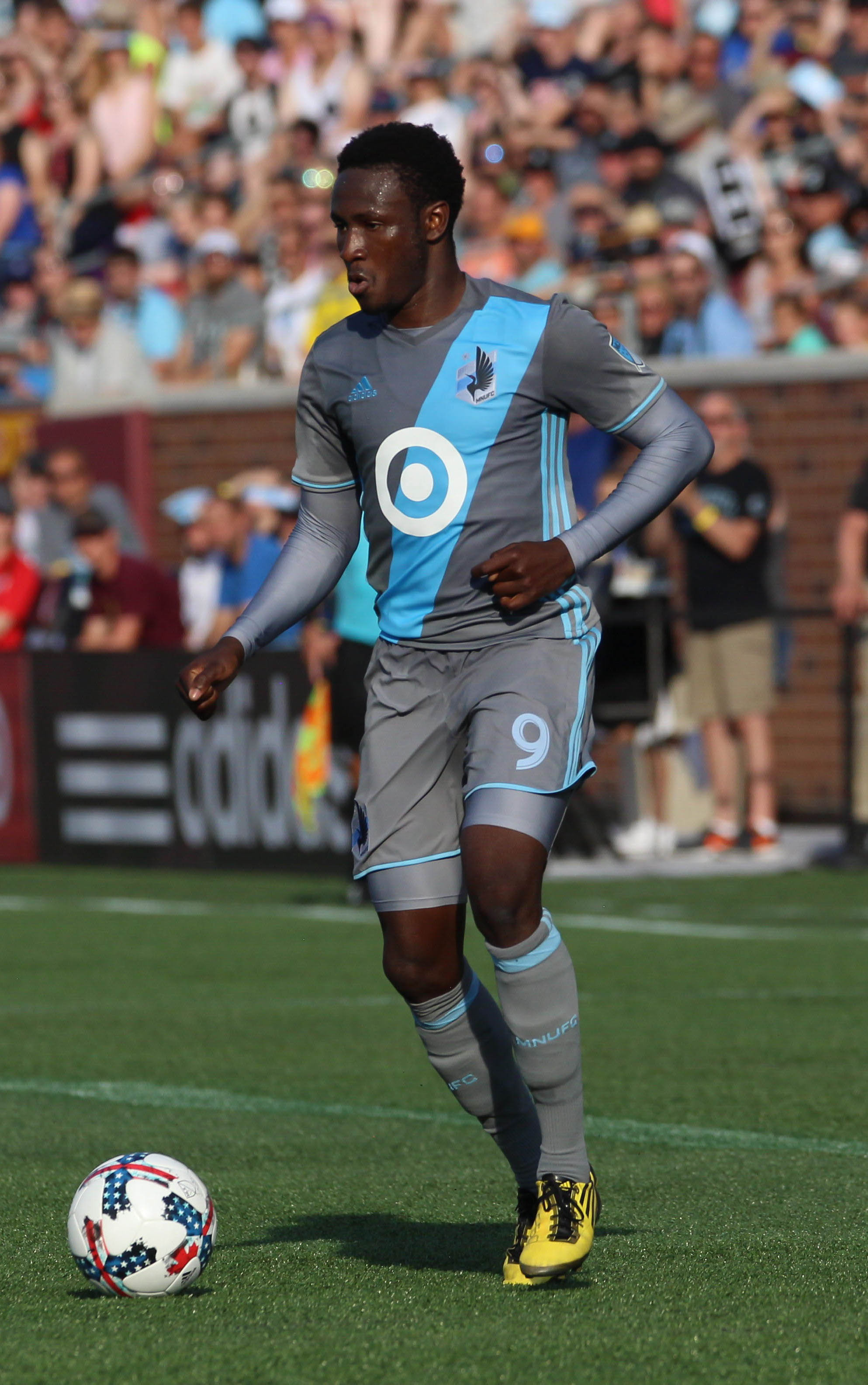
Abu Danladi, drafted out of UCLA, was the first overall draft pick in 2017.

The Major League Soccer SuperDraft's first overall pick is the player who is selected first among all eligible draftees by a team during the annual Major League Soccer (MLS) SuperDraft. The first pick is awarded to the club with the poorest regular season record during the previous MLS campaign. Exceptions are when there is an expansion franchise, where the expansion side has the opportunity to select the first overall draft pick.

Two first picks have won the MLS Rookie of the Year award in their maiden season: Maurice Edu and Cyle Larin.

No first pick has ever won the Landon Donovan MVP Award, although Alecko Eskandarian is the only first draft pick to win the MLS Cup Most Valuable Player Award.

Note that between 1996 and 1999, the MLS draft was known as the MLS College Draft. Official MLS publications include the College Draft as part of MLS's draft history.

== Key ==
^	Denotes players who have been selected to the All-Star Game or MLS Best XI
*	Elected to the National Soccer Hall of Fame
^*	Denotes Hall of Famers who have been selected to the All-Star Game
Player (in italic text)	Young Player of the Year
App.	MLS appearances
Goals	MLS goals
Asst.	MLS assists

== List of first overall picks ==
Draft	Selected by	Player	Nationality	Position	College/high school/former club	MLS rookie statistics			Ref.
Draft	Selected by	Player	Nationality	Position	College/high school/former club	App.	Goals	Asst.	Ref.
1996	Kansas City Wiz	Matt McKeon	USA	DF	Saint Louis	12	0	1	
1997	Colorado Rapids	Tahj Jakins	USA	DF	UCLA	19	0	1	
1998	Miami Fusion	Leo Cullen	USA	DF	Maryland	31	1	4	
1999	D.C. United	Jason Moore	USA	MF	Virginia	16	0	2	
2000	MetroStars	Steve Shak	USA	MF	UCLA	23	1	1	
2001	San Jose Earthquakes	Chris Carrieri	USA	FW	North Carolina	5	0	0	
2002	Dallas Burn	Chris Gbandi	LBR	DF	Connecticut	22	1	2	
2003	D.C. United	Alecko Eskandarian	USA	FW	Virginia	23	3	2	
2004	D.C. United	Freddy Adu	USA	FW	IMG Academy (Note: Freddy Adu had also played middle school soccer for The Heights School in Potomac, Maryland.)	30	5	3	
2005	Real Salt Lake	Nikolas Besagno	USA	MF	IMG Academy	2	0	0	
2006	New York Red Bulls	Marvell Wynne	USA	DF	UCLA	28	0	3	
2007	Toronto FC	Maurice Edu^	USA	DF	Maryland	25	4	1	
2008	Kansas City Wizards	Chance Myers	USA	DF	UCLA	10	0	0	
2009	Seattle Sounders FC	Steve Zakuani^	COD	FW	Akron	29	4	4	
2010	Philadelphia Union	Danny Mwanga	COD	FW	Oregon State	24	7	4	
2011	Vancouver Whitecaps FC	Omar Salgado	USA	FW	Guadalajara Academy (Note: Omar Salgado had left Guadalajara's academy prior to being eligible for the draft. The Guadalajara Academy was the most recent soccer setup he played for prior to being drafted by Vancouver.)	14	1	1	
2012	Montreal Impact	Andrew Wenger	USA	FW	Duke	23	4	0	
2013	New England Revolution	Andrew Farrell^	USA	DF	Louisville	32	0	1	
2014	Philadelphia Union	Andre Blake^	JAM	GK	UConn	1	0	0	
2015	Orlando City SC	Cyle Larin^	CAN	FW	UConn	27	17	0	
2016	Chicago Fire	Jack Harrison (Note: Jack Harrison was immediately traded from Chicago Fire to New York City FC. Harrison's statistics reflect his 2016 season with New York City FC.)	ENG	MF	Wake Forest	21	4	8	
2017	Minnesota United FC	Abu Danladi	GHA	FW	UCLA	27	8	3	
2018	Los Angeles FC	João Moutinho	POR	DF	Akron	14	1	0	
2019	FC Cincinnati	Frankie Amaya	USA	MF	UCLA	19	0	0	
2020	Inter Miami CF	Robbie Robinson	USA	FW	Clemson	12	0	1	
2021	Austin FC	Daniel Pereira	VEN	MF	Virginia Tech	25	0	0	
2022	Charlotte FC	Ben Bender	USA	MF	Maryland	27	3	6	
2023	Charlotte FC	Hamady Diop	SEN	DF	Clemson	3	0	0	
2024	Toronto FC	Tyrese Spicer	TRI	FW	Lipscomb	19	2	0	
2025	San Diego FC	Manu Duah	GHA	MF	UC Santa Barbara	14	0	0	
2026	D.C. United	Nikola Marković	CAN	DF	NC State	23	0	1	
2027	CF Montréal					—	—	—	

== See also ==
- MLS SuperDraft
- List of first overall NASL draft picks
