= Kyle Helton =

American soccer player (born 1986)

Personal information
- Full name: Kyle Helton
- Date of birth: May 20, 1986 (age 40)
- Place of birth: Birmingham, Alabama, United States
- Height: 5 ft 8 in (1.73 m)
- Position: Defender

College career
Years	Team	Apps	(Gls)
2003–2006	Duke Blue Devils		

Senior career*
Years	Team	Apps	(Gls)
2006	Augusta Fireball	6	(0)
2007–2008	New England Revolution	0	(0)
2009	Austin Aztex U23	3	(0)
2009–2011	Austin Aztex	4	(0)
2011–2012	Mjøndalen	44	(2)

International career^{‡}
2003	United States U-17	3	(0)
- * Club domestic league appearances and goals as of 31 August 2013 ‡ National team caps and goals as of 1 April 2010

Kyle Helton (born May 20, 1986, in Birmingham, Alabama) is an American former soccer player who last played for Mjøndalen.

== Career ==
=== Youth and amateur ===
Helton grew up in Birmingham, Alabama before moving to Alpharetta, Georgia, attended Milton High School, and played college soccer at Duke University where he earned a degree in economics and public policy at age 21. He was named to the Parade Magazine All-America team in 2003, was selected to play in the McDonald's All-America High School game, was part of the ACC All-Freshman Team in 2003, and was named to the Second Team All-ACC in 2006. He also played club soccer with the Atlanta Fire, leading the team to the national championship in 2002, third place at the nationals in 2001 and two regional championships.

During his college years Helton also played with Augusta Fireball in the USL Premier Development League.

=== Professional ===
Helton was drafted in the fourth round (51st overall) of the 2007 MLS SuperDraft by New England Revolution

Helton made his professional debut on July 10, 2007, in the third round of a US Open Cup game against the Rochester Rhinos, entering the game in the 84th minute. He also played extensively in the MLS Reserve Division until the end of 2008.

Helton signed with Austin Aztex U23 of the USL Premier Development League for the 2009 season. After making three starts for the U23 team, Helton was promoted up to the Austin Aztex senior team in May 2009, and made his debut for the team on May 17, 2009, in a game against Montreal Impact. In Spring 2011 signed for Norwegian club Mjøndalen IF.

=== International ===
Helton joined the United States Under-17 National Team as a sophomore and played in more than 60 matches with the U.S. Youth National team in 2002–2003. He was part of the United States squad at the 2003 FIFA U-17 World Championship in Lahti, Finland.

== Honors ==
=== New England Revolution ===
- Lamar Hunt U.S. Open Cup (1): 2007
