= MLS Young Player of the Year Award =

Award in Major League Soccer

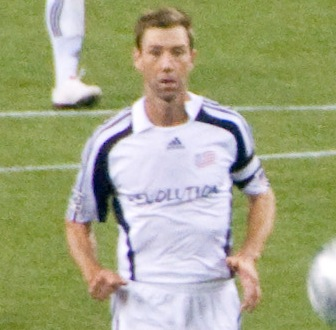
Tampa Bay Mutiny's Steve Ralston was the inaugural winner in 1996

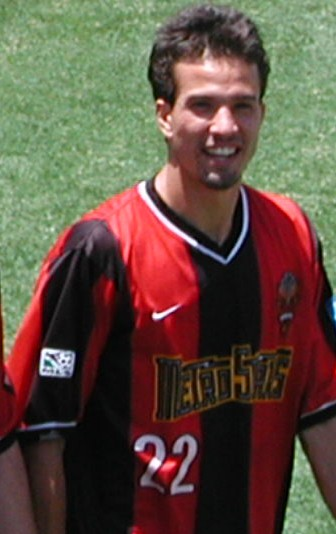
In 2001, MetroStar's Rodrigo Faria became the first non-American player to win the award

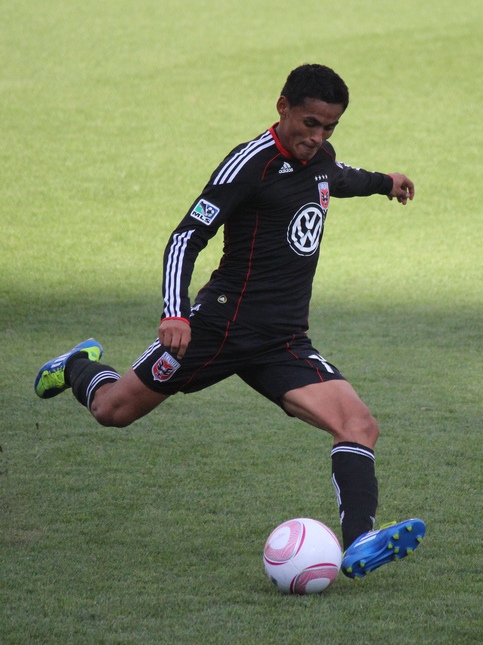
In 2010, D.C. United's Andy Najar became the first homegrown player to win the award

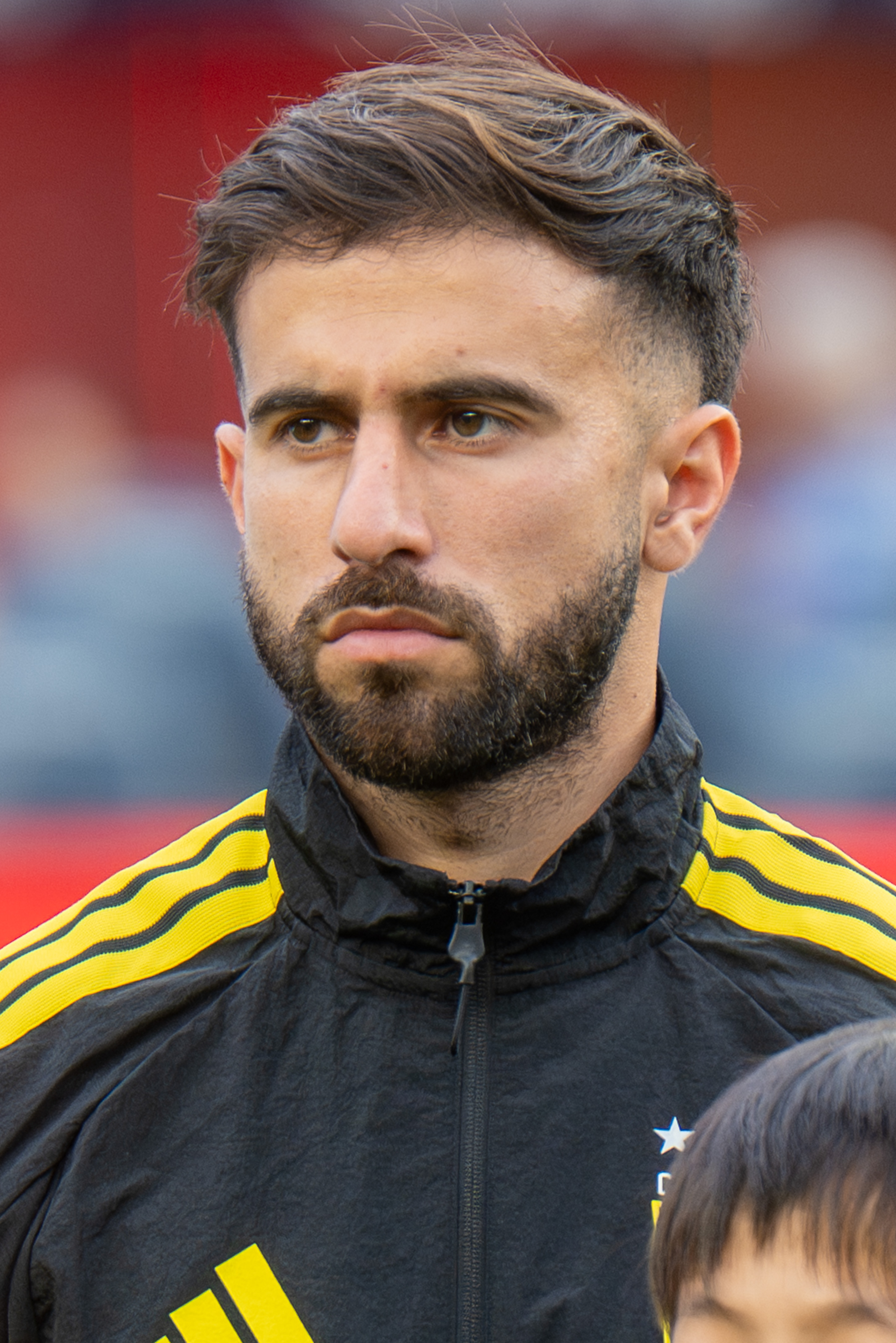
In 2020, Los Angeles FC's Diego Rossi became the first player to win it under the under 22 format

The MLS Young Player of the Year Award (known as the Rookie of the Year Award from 1996 to 2019) is an annual award given to the top player in Major League Soccer under the age of 22.

The award was initially awarded to a rookie, or a player who no prior professional experience, usually to players that had previously played in MLS youth team academies or played college soccer. This practice is fairly common in other American sports leagues, such as the MLB Rookie of the Year (baseball), NASCAR Rookie of the Year (motorsports), NFL Rookie of the Year Award (American football), the Eddie Gottlieb Trophy (basketball), and the Calder Memorial Trophy (ice hockey).

In 2020, MLS replaced the Rookie of the Year Award with the MLS Young Player of the Year Award, given to the best player in the league aged 22 and under, regardless of prior professional playing experience.

== Winners ==
=== Rookie of the Year Award (1996–2019) ===
| Season | Player | Position | Team | Draft Pick | Draft Class | College |
|---|---|---|---|---|---|---|
| 1996 | (United States) Steve Ralston | Midfielder | Tampa Bay Mutiny | 18 | 1996 MLS College Draft | Florida International |
| 1997 | (United States) Mike Duhaney | Defender | Tampa Bay Mutiny | 87 | 1996 MLS Inaugural Draft | UNLV |
| 1998 | (United States) Ben Olsen | Midfielder | D.C. United | N/A | Project-40 | Virginia |
| 1999 | (United States) Jay Heaps | Defender | Miami Fusion | 2 | 1999 MLS College Draft | Duke |
| 2000 | (United States) Carlos Bocanegra | Defender | Chicago Fire | 4 | 2000 MLS SuperDraft | UCLA |
| 2001 | (Brazil) Rodrigo Faria | Forward | MetroStars | 13 | 2001 MLS SuperDraft | Concordia College |
| 2002 | (United States) Kyle Martino | Midfielder | Columbus Crew | 8 | 2002 MLS SuperDraft | Virginia |
| 2003 | (Jamaica) Damani Ralph | Forward | Chicago Fire | 18 | 2003 MLS SuperDraft | Connecticut |
| 2004 | (United States) Clint Dempsey | Midfielder | New England Revolution | 8 | 2004 MLS SuperDraft | Furman |
| 2005 | (United States) Michael Parkhurst | Defender | New England Revolution | 9 | 2005 MLS SuperDraft | Wake Forest |
| 2006 | (United States) Jonathan Bornstein | Defender | Chivas USA | 37 | 2006 MLS SuperDraft | UCLA |
| 2007 | (United States) Maurice Edu | Midfielder | Toronto FC | 1 | 2007 MLS SuperDraft | Maryland |
| 2008 | (United States) Sean Franklin | Defender | LA Galaxy | 4 | 2008 MLS SuperDraft | Cal State Northridge |
| 2009 | (United States) Omar Gonzalez | Defender | LA Galaxy | 3 | 2009 MLS SuperDraft | Maryland |
| 2010 | (Honduras) Andy Najar | Midfielder | D.C. United | N/A | Homegrown Player | N/A |
| 2011 | (United States) C. J. Sapong | Forward | Sporting Kansas City | 10 | 2011 MLS SuperDraft | James Madison |
| 2012 | (United States) Austin Berry | Defender | Chicago Fire | 9 | 2012 MLS SuperDraft | Louisville |
| 2013 | (United States) Dillon Powers | Midfielder | Colorado Rapids | 11 | 2013 MLS SuperDraft | Notre Dame |
| 2014 | (Canada) Tesho Akindele | Forward | FC Dallas | 6 | 2014 MLS SuperDraft | Colorado School of Mines |
| 2015 | (Canada) Cyle Larin | Forward | Orlando City SC | 1 | 2015 MLS SuperDraft | Connecticut |
| 2016 | (United States) Jordan Morris | Forward | Seattle Sounders FC | N/A | Homegrown Player | Stanford |
| 2017 | (Germany) Julian Gressel | Midfielder | Atlanta United FC | 8 | 2017 MLS SuperDraft | Providence College |
| 2018 | (United States) Corey Baird | Forward | Real Salt Lake | N/A | Homegrown Player | Stanford |
| 2019 | (Brazil) Andre Shinyashiki | Forward | Colorado Rapids | 5 | 2019 MLS SuperDraft | Denver |

=== Young Player of the Year Award (2020–present) ===
| Season | Player | Position | Team | Age |
|---|---|---|---|---|
| 2020 | (Uruguay) Diego Rossi | Forward | Los Angeles FC | 22 |
| 2021 | (United States) Ricardo Pepi | Forward | FC Dallas | 18 |
| 2022 | (United States) Jesús Ferreira | Forward | FC Dallas | 21 |
| 2023 | (Argentina) Thiago Almada | Midfielder | Atlanta United FC | 22 |
| 2024 | (United States) Diego Luna | Midfielder | Real Salt Lake | 21 |
| 2025 | (United States) Alex Freeman | Defender | Orlando City SC | 21 |

== Wins by playing position ==
| Position | Winners |
|---|---|
| Defender | 9 |
| Forward | 9 |
| Midfielder | 10 |
| Goalkeeper | 0 |

== Wins by nationality ==
| Nationality | Winners |
|---|---|
| United States | 20 |
| Canada | 2 |
| Brazil | 2 |
| Germany | 1 |
| Honduras | 1 |
| Jamaica | 1 |
| Uruguay | 1 |
| Argentina | 1 |

== Wins by team ==
| Team | Winners |
|---|---|
| Chicago Fire | 3 |
| FC Dallas | 3 |
| Colorado Rapids | 2 |
| D.C. United | 2 |
| Los Angeles Galaxy | 2 |
| New England Revolution | 2 |
| Tampa Bay Mutiny | 2 |
| Atlanta United FC | 2 |
| Real Salt Lake | 2 |
| Orlando City SC | 2 |
| Chivas USA | 1 |
| Columbus Crew | 1 |
| MetroStars | 1 |
| Miami Fusion | 1 |
| Seattle Sounders FC | 1 |
| Sporting Kansas City | 1 |
| Toronto FC | 1 |
| Los Angeles FC | 1 |
