= Anthony Griffiths =

Anthony Griffiths may refer to:

- Antony Griffiths (born 1951), English art historian and curator of prints
- Anthony Griffith (footballer) (born 1986), English-born footballer for Montserrat
- Anthony Griffith (actor), American actor and comedian
