= Patriots Park (Bakersfield) =

Public park in Bakersfield, California

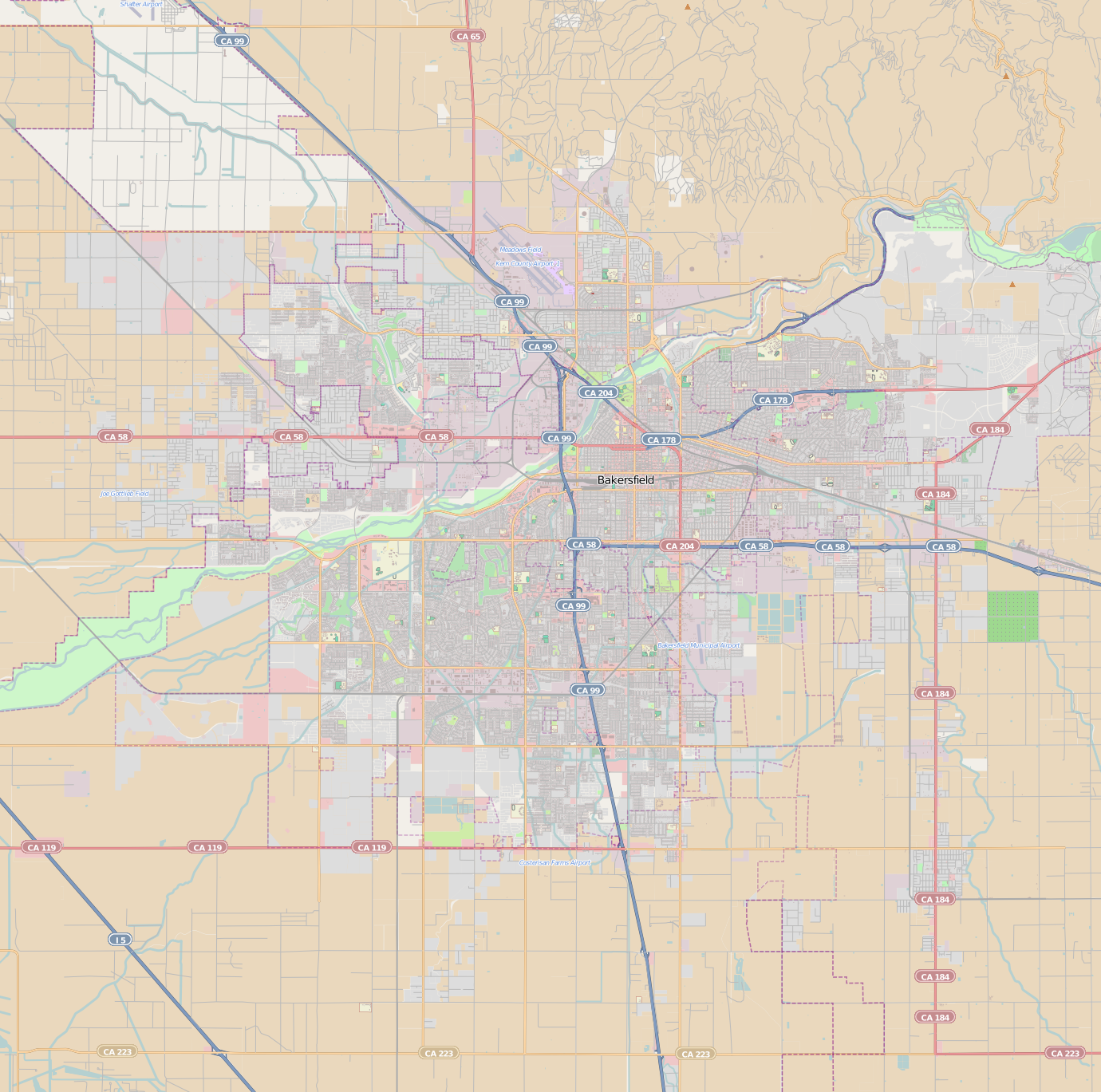
- Location within Bakersfield, California Location within California
- Type: Public Park
- Location: Bakersfield, California
- Coordinates: 35°20′25″N 119°03′36″W
- Area: 20 acres (8.1 ha)
- Operator: Bakersfield Department of Recreation and Parks
- Status: Open all year

Patriots Park is a public park in Bakersfield, California. It is constructed on 20 acres (8.1 ha) at the corner of Ming Ave and New Stine Rd, although the park wraps around an apartment complex at the exact corner.

== Amenities ==
Patriots Park is one of the few parks that contain lighted baseball fields. The fields are fenced and contain dugouts. There are no bleachers. The fields are located at the base of a storm drain sump overflow. As a result, after most rain storms, the fields are typically flooded.

The park also contains two lighted basketball courts and one lighted volleyball court. There is a large open space, which is used for many lawn sports. There are two reservable picnic areas, located adjacent to each other. They both contain tables, barbecues, and shaded serving areas. They can be occupied by two separate groups, or combined for large gatherings.

In addition, there are several individual picnic areas scattered throughout the park. They seat 8 to 16 people and most have a barbecue. The park also contains restrooms and a playground.
