= John Drummond =

John Drummond is the name of:

- John de Drummond (1105–1155) and John de Drummond (1135–1180), of Clan Drummond
- Sir John Drummond 2nd of Innerpeffray (c. 1486 – c. 1565)
- John Drummond of Jamaica (1744–1804), surgeon and landowner
- John Drummond of Milnab (died c. 1550), 16th-century Scottish engineer
- John Fraser Drummond (1918–1940), WW2 fighter pilot
- John Drummond, 1st Earl of Melfort (1649–1714), Earl of Melfort
- John Drummond, 15th Baron Strange (1900–1982), of Megginch Castle, Scotland, author, farmer, politician
- John Drummond (1676–1742), of Quarrell, Member of Parliament (MP) for Perth Burghs, Scotland (1727–1743)
- John Drummond, 10th of Lennoch and 3rd of Megginch (died 1752), MP for Perthshire, Scotland (1727–1734)
- John Drummond (1723–1774), banker and MP for Thetford (1768–1774)
- John Drummond, 12th of Lennoch and 5th of Megginch, contractor and MP for Shaftesbury (1786–1790)
- John Drummond (Australian settler) (1816–1906), settler of Western Australia
- John Douglas Fraser Drummond (1860–1925), Canadian farmer and politician
- John Drummond (footballer) (1869–?), Scottish footballer
- John Drummond (Manitoba politician) (1847–1913), politician in Manitoba, Canada
- John W. Drummond (1919–2016), American politician, member of the South Carolina Senate
- John Drummond, pseudonym used by British writer John Lymington (1911–1983)
- John Drummond (arts administrator) (1934–2006), British arts administrator and BBC executive
- John Drummond (musicologist) (born 1944), New Zealand composer and academic
- The name of several Earls of Perth, including:
  - John Drummond, 1st Lord Drummond (died 1519), Scottish statesman
  - John Drummond, 2nd Earl of Perth (1588–1662), Scottish nobleman
  - John Drummond, 4th Duke of Perth (1713–1747), de jure 7th Earl of Perth
  - Eric Drummond, 7th Earl of Perth (1876–1951)), first secretary-general of the League of Nations (1920–1933)
  - David Drummond, 8th Earl of Perth (John David Drummond, 1907–2002), de jure 17th earl

== See also ==
- Jock Drummond (1870–1935), Scottish footballer
- Jon Drummond (born 1968), American athlete
- Johnston Drummond (1820–1845), early settler of Western Australia
