= Ben Hunter =

English footballer

Personal information
- Full name: Benjamin Arthur Hunter
- Date of birth: 16 June 1985 (age 41)
- Place of birth: Doncaster, England
- Height: 6 ft 0 in (1.83 m)
- Position: Forward

Team information
- Current team: Matlock Town
- Number: 7

Youth career
- Doncaster Rovers
- 2003–2004: Rio Grande Red Storm
- 2005–2006: North Carolina Tar Heels

Senior career*
| Years | Team | Apps | (Gls) |
| 2005–2006 | Carolina Dynamo | 26 | (8) |
| 2007–2008 | Columbus Crew | 0 | (0) |
| 2007 | → Cleveland City Stars (loan) | 4 | (1) |
| 2008–2009 | Richmond Kickers | 29 | (4) |
| 2010–2011 | Real Maryland Monarchs | 19 | (4) |
| 2012–2013 | North Ferriby United | 23 | (2) |
| 2012–2013 | Matlock Town | ? | (?) |
| 2013–2014 | North Ferriby United | 5 | (0) |
- * Club domestic league appearances and goals as of 3 May 2014

Benjamin Arthur Hunter (born 16 June 1985) is an English footballer who plays as a forward.

== Career ==
=== Youth and college ===
Hunter grew up in Gainsborough, attended Queen Elizabeth's High School, and was a member of the junior academy at English professional club Doncaster Rovers prior to his moving to the United States in 2003 to attend and play college soccer at the University of Rio Grande in Ohio.

At Rio Grande, Hunter totaled 43 goals and 17 assists in two seasons, and led the team to the NAIA national title in 2003, while being named the 2004 American Mideast Conference South Division Player of the Year and earning All-Conference and All-Regional honors. He transferred to the University of North Carolina at Chapel Hill as a junior, where he amassed 17 goals and 10 assists for 44 points in 41 games played.

Hunter also played in the USL Premier Development League with Carolina Dynamo, where he scored the game-winning goal against the professional Richmond Kickers in US Open Cup in 2006.

Hunter also went on to represent Great Britain at the World University games in Bangkok, Thailand in 2007.

=== Professional ===
Hunter was drafted by Columbus Crew in the fourth round (49th overall) of the 2007 MLS SuperDraft, Hunter appeared in 24 games for Columbus along with four appearances on loan with Cleveland City Stars during the 2007 season.

Hunter signed with the Richmond Kickers of the USL Division in 2008, and was part of the team which won the 2009 USL championship.

== Honors ==
=== Richmond Kickers ===
- USL Second Division Champions (1): 2009
