= John Cunliffe (footballer, born 1984) =

English footballer

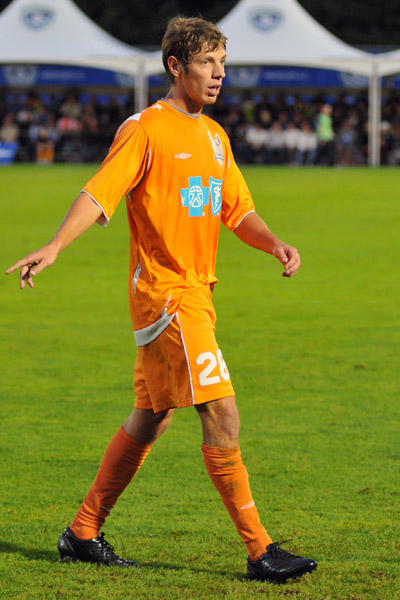

Personal information
- Full name: John Luke Cunliffe
- Date of birth: 8 August 1984 (age 42)
- Place of birth: Bolton, England
- Position: Striker

Youth career
- Manchester United
- Blackburn Rovers

College career
Years	Team	Apps	(Gls)
2003–2006	Fort Lewis Skyhawks		

Senior career*
Years	Team	Apps	(Gls)
2005	Boulder Rapids Reserve	6	(2)
2005–2006	Rossendale United		
2006	Boulder Rapids Reserve	15	(18)
2007	Chivas USA	15	(3)
2008	San Jose Earthquakes	12	(2)
2009	Carolina RailHawks	24	(3)
2010–2013	Chorley	41	(9)
Total		107	(35)
- * Club domestic league appearances and goals as of 13:20, 12 April 2016 (UTC)

John Cunliffe (born 8 August 1984) is an English former professional footballer.

== Career ==
=== College and amateur ===
Born in Bolton, Cunliffe was a schoolboy trainee with both Manchester United and Blackburn Rovers, before moving to the United States to play college soccer in 2002. He was a pupil at Turton Media Arts College in Bromley Cross, Bolton before turning professional and moving to America to pursue a career in football.

After posting remarkable scoring totals at NCAA Division II Fort Lewis College in Durango, Colorado, and in the USL Premier Development League, for Boulder Rapids Reserve, Cunliffe was one of the leading prospects at the MLS combine prior to the 2007 MLS SuperDraft.

Cunliffe also had a brief spell at English Northern Premier League First Division North outfit Rossendale United in 2005–06.

=== Professional ===
Cunliffe was drafted in the first round (7th overall) of the 2007 MLS SuperDraft by Chivas USA. He made his MLS debut on 7 April against Toronto FC and assisted on the clinching goal in a 2–0 win. He scored his first MLS goal against the Kansas City Wizards on 29 July 2007.

He was acquired by San Jose for Chris Pozniak on 28 March 2008, the day before the beginning of the 2008 season. He scored his first goal with the Earthquakes on 31 May 2008 in a 3–1 to loss to Real Salt Lake, a rocket shot from within the penalty area. He nearly scored a second goal later in the match with a shot that went slightly wide. On 2 March 2009, just prior to the start of the 2009 season, Cunliffe was placed on waivers by the Earthquakes.

He joined Carolina RailHawks for the 2009 season.

In December 2010, Cunliffe returned to England signing for Chorley. In April 2013 Cunliffe announced his retirement from the game due to a long-standing ankle problem.
