= List of first overall NASL draft picks =

The North American Soccer League Draft first overall pick was the player who is selected first among all eligible draftees by a team during the annual North American Soccer League (NASL) Draft. The first pick was awarded to the club with the poorest regular season record during the previous NASL campaign. Exceptions were when there was an expansion club, where the expansion side has the opportunity to select the first overall draft pick.

The draft was held in 1968 and annually from 1972 until 1984.

== Key ==
^	Denotes players who have been selected to the All-Star Game or NASL Best XI
*	Elected to the National Soccer Hall of Fame
^*	Denotes Hall of Famers who have been selected to the All-Star Game
**Player** (in bold text)	Rookie of the Year
App.	NASL appearances
Goals	NASL goals
Asst.	NASL assists

== List of first overall picks ==
Draft	Selected by	Player	Nationality	Position	College/high school/former club	NASL rookie statistics			Ref.
Draft	Selected by	Player	Nationality	Position	College/high school/former club	App.	Goals	Asst.	Ref.
1968	New York Generals	Ford Brunner	USA	GK	Akron	12	0	1	
1969–1971	No draft								
1972	Miami Gatos	Alain Maca	BEL	DF	Brockport	11	0	0	
1973	Philadelphia Atoms	Bob Rigby^	USA	GK	East Stroudsburg	13	0	0	
1974	Los Angeles Aztecs	José López	MEX	FW	UCLA	10	0	0	
1975	Tampa Bay Rowdies	Farrukh Quraishi^	IRN	DF	Oneonta State	23	0	0	
1976	Los Angeles Aztecs	Steve Ralbovsky	YUG	DF	Brown	22	2	1	
1977	Dallas Tornado	Glenn Myernick*	USA	DF	Hartwick	22	0	2	
1978	Colorado Caribous	Greg Makowski	USA	DF	SIU Edwardsville	30	2	5	
1979	Dallas Tornado	Njego Pesa	YUG	FW	Ulster County CC	12	1	1	
1980	New York Cosmos	Don Ebert	USA	FW	SIU Edwardsville	0	0	0	
1981	Tulsa Roughnecks	**Joe Morrone, Jr.**	USA	MF	Connecticut	30	8	6	
1982	Tampa Bay Rowdies	**Pedro DeBrito**	CPV	FW	Connecticut	29	2	4	
1983	Tampa Bay Rowdies	**Gregg Thompson**^	USA	DF	Indiana	30	0	1	
1984	Tampa Bay Rowdies	**Roy Wegerle**	RSA	FW	South Florida	21	9	7	

== See also ==
- List of first overall MLS draft picks
