= Westchester Flames =

- Full name: Westchester Flames
- Nicknames: The Flames, The Burn
- Founded: 1999; 27 years ago
- Stadium: City Park Stadium; New Rochelle, New York
- Capacity: 1,845
- Owner: Gus Marangoudakis
- Head Coach: Edson Buddle
- League: USL League Two
- 2024: 5th, Metropolitan Division; Playoffs: DNQ
- Website: westchesterflames.com
Home colors

Westchester Flames is an American soccer club based in New Rochelle, New York, United States. Founded in 1999, the team plays in USL League Two, the fourth tier of the American soccer pyramid.

The team plays its home games at City Park Stadium, where they have played since 2001. The team's colors are blue and white.

The team also fields a team in the USL’s Super-20 League, a league for players 17 to 20 years of age run under the United Soccer Leagues umbrella.

== History ==
The team had its first season in 1999, when they finished with a respectable 7–9 record, under former New York Cosmos superstar Vladislav Bogićević. Home games were played at Manhattanville College in Purchase, NY. In 2001, Westchester Flames were the champions of Premier Development League

== Notable former players ==
This list of notable former players comprises players who went on to play professional soccer after playing for the team in the Premier Development League, or those who previously played professionally before joining the team.

- (United States) Andre Akpan
- (Colombia) Jhonny Arteaga
- (Jamaica) Dwight Barnett
- (United States) Scott Bolkan
- (United States) Kevin Burns
- (United States) Charlie Davies
- (Romania) Costea Decu
- (Brazil) Rodrigo Faria
- (Trinidad and Tobago) Julius James
- (Puerto Rico) Chris Megaloudis
- (United States) Ricky Schramm
- (United States) Ibrahim Yusuf
- (United States) Jake Keegan
- (United States) Lars Brownworth
- (United States) Sean Nealis

== Year-by-year ==
Year	Division	League	Regular season	Playoffs	Open Cup
1999	4	USL PDL	4th, Northeast	did not qualify	did not qualify
2000	4	USL PDL	1st, Northeast	National Semifinals (3rd Place)	did not qualify
2001	4	USL PDL	1st, Northeast	Champion	did not qualify
2002	3	USL D-3 Pro League	3rd, Northern	did not qualify	did not qualify
2003	3	USL Pro Select League	2nd, Northern	Final	did not qualify
2004	3	USL Pro Soccer League	2nd, Northern	did not qualify	3rd Round
2005	4	USL PDL	9th, Northeast	did not qualify	did not qualify
2006	4	USL PDL	1st, Northeast	National Semifinals	did not qualify
2007	4	USL PDL	3rd, Northeast	did not qualify	did not qualify
2008	4	USL PDL	4th, Northeast	did not qualify	did not qualify
2009	4	USL PDL	7th, Northeast	did not qualify	did not qualify
2010	4	USL PDL	9th, Northeast	did not qualify	did not qualify
2011	4	USL PDL	4th, Mid Atlantic	did not qualify	did not qualify
2012	4	USL PDL	10th, Mid Atlantic	did not qualify	did not qualify
2013	4	USL PDL	9th, Mid Atlantic	did not qualify	did not qualify
2014	4	USL PDL	7th, Northeast	did not qualify	did not qualify
2015	4	USL PDL	9th, Mid Atlantic	did not qualify	did not qualify
2016	4	USL PDL	7th, Northeast	did not qualify	did not qualify
2017	4	USL PDL	7th, Northeast	did not qualify	did not qualify
2018	4	USL PDL	6th, Northeast	did not qualify	did not qualify
2019	4	USL League Two	7th, Northeast	did not qualify	did not qualify
2020	4	USL League Two	Season cancelled due to COVID-19 pandemic		
2021	4	USL League Two	9th, Metropolitan	did not qualify	did not qualify
2022	4	USL League Two	8th, Metropolitan	did not qualify	did not qualify
2023	4	USL League Two	7th, Metropolitan	did not qualify	did not qualify
2024	4	USL League Two	5th, Metropolitan	did not qualify	did not qualify
2025	4	USL League Two	10th, Metropolitan	did not qualify	did not qualify
2026	4	USL League Two	10th, Metropolitan	did not qualify	did not qualify

== Honors ==
- USL PDL Eastern Conference Champions 2006
- USL PDL Northeast Division Champions 2006
- USL PDL Champions 2001
- USL PDL Eastern Conference Champions 2001
- USL PDL Northeast Division Champions 2001
- USL PDL Regular Season Champions 2000
- USL PDL Eastern Conference Champions 2000
- USL PDL Northeast Division Champions 2000

== Head coaches ==
- (Socialist Federal Republic of Yugoslavia) Vladislav Bogićević (1999)
- (United States) Anthony Roros
- (Nigeria) Ernest Inneh (2005–2006)
- (United States) Gus Skoufis (2007–present)

== Stadia ==
- Manhattanville College; Purchase, New York (1999)
- Fordham University; Bronx, New York (2000)
- City Park Stadium; New Rochelle, New York (2001–2008, 2010–present)
- McKenna Field at New Rochelle High School; New Rochelle, New York (2009)

== Average attendance ==
Attendance stats are calculated by averaging each team's self-reported home attendances from the historical match archive at http://www.uslsoccer.com/history/index_E.html.

- 2005: 127
- 2006: 143
- 2007: 88
- 2008: 115
- 2009: 57 (lowest in PDL)
- 2010: 80
- 2011: 55
- 2012: 140
