= Ricky Schramm =

American soccer player

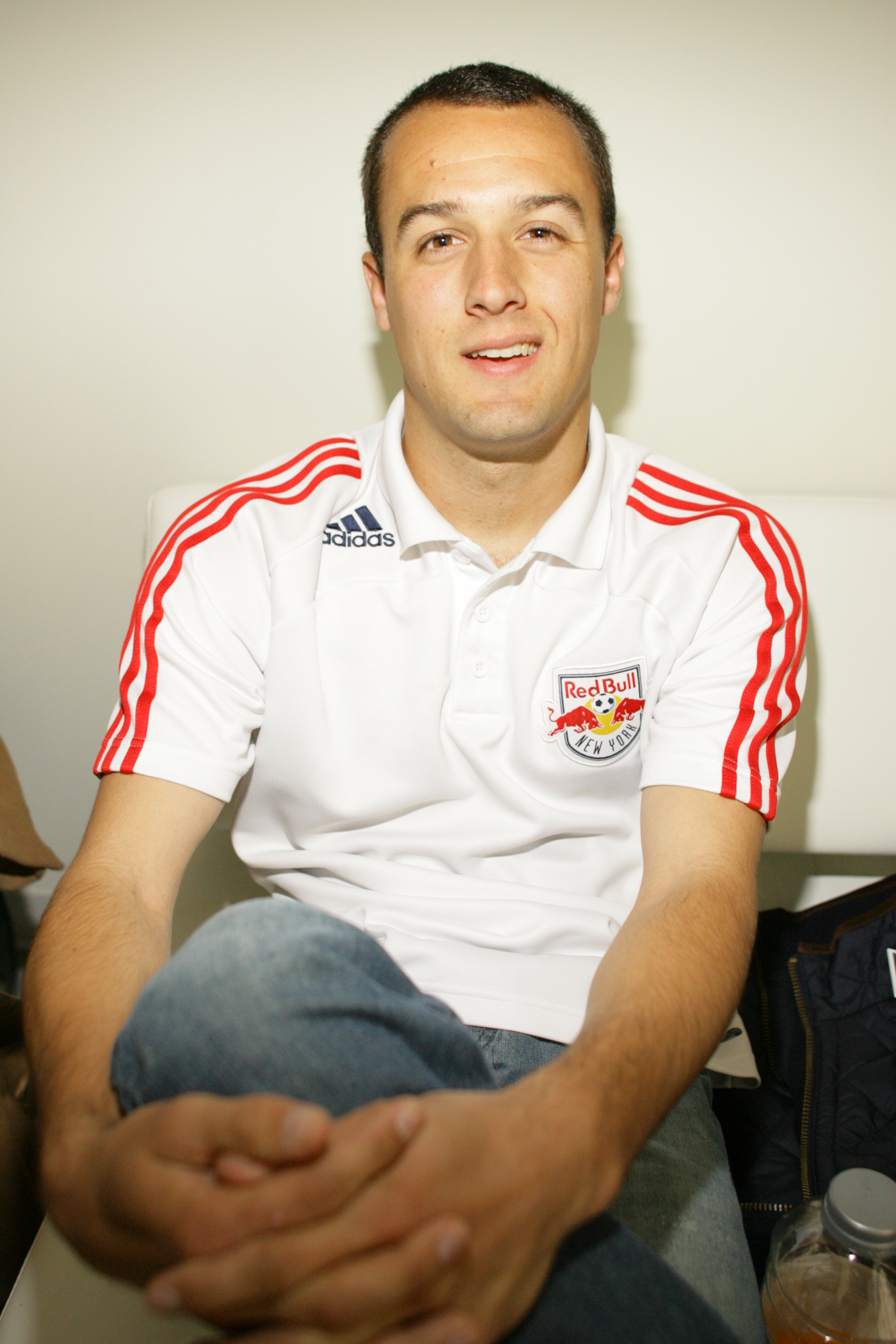

Personal information
- Full name: Frederick John Schramm III
- Date of birth: October 26, 1985 (age 41)
- Place of birth: Roseland, New Jersey, United States
- Height: 5 ft 11 in (1.80 m)
- Position: Forward

College career
Years	Team	Apps	(Gls)
2003–2006	Georgetown University	78	(39)

Senior career*
Years	Team	Apps	(Gls)
2005	Cape Cod Crusaders	12	(2)
2006	Westchester Flames	14	(11)
2007	Richmond Kickers	16	(6)
2008	New York Red Bulls	0	(0)
2008	→ Richmond Kickers (loan)	1	(1)
2009	Aegean Hawks		
- * Club domestic league appearances and goals as of 21 July 2008

Ricky Schramm (born October 26, 1985) is a former American soccer player who played as a forward.

== College career ==
Schramm grew up in Eastchester, New York. He went on to lead the Fordham Prep Rams to four successful seasons and holds the record for goals scored. After four years at the Prep, Ricky signed with Georgetown University in Washington D.C. In 2003, as a freshman, Ricky led Georgetown scorers with 21 points. In this season, he won Offensive Player of the Year for Georgetown, his nine goals placed fourteenth in Hoya single season history. He ranked sixth in the Big East for goals and tied for sixth in points. During his impressive freshman year, he was twice named Big East Player of the Week and he started 14 of the 19 games. In his sophomore year, he showed the NCAA why he was indeed a force to be reckoned with. He won the Big East's Offensive Player of the Year along with All-BIG East First Team honors. He was also named Georgetown University Offensive Player of the Year and was a Third Team NSCAA All-South Atlantic Region selection. He was first on the team in goals and points which led the BIG EAST as well with 13 and 32 respectively, played in 21 games and started 19 plus had six assists. He was also named to Soccer America Team of the Week after scoring a total of four goals in Hoya wins over West Virginia and Syracuse. In 2006 Schramm also played for Premier Development League side Westchester Flames, leading the club with 11 goals in 14 appearances.

== Club career ==
On January 12, 2007, Schramm was drafted by D.C. United, his college town's team, with the 37th overall pick in the 2007 MLS SuperDraft. Unfortunately, things did not work out between Ricky and D.C. United as he was released during training camp. Schramm then signed with USL Second Division side Richmond Kickers, scoring 6 times in 16 appearances. Following his season with Richmond, he started to train with New York Red Bulls of Major League Soccer and appeared in the teams reserve matches, scoring two goals against Real Salt Lake Reserves on 9/30/07. In early 2008 Schramm was given a tryout with the senior Red Bulls squad, his play earned him a developmental contract. He was waived on July 21, 2008.
