= 2007 MLS SuperDraft =

College draft for soccer teams

General information
- Sport: Soccer
- Date(s): January 12, 2007
- Time: 12:00pm (ET)
- Location: Indianapolis, Indiana
- Network(s): ESPN2

Overview
- 52 total selections
- First selection: Maurice Edu, Toronto FC
- Most selections: FC Dallas; New England Revolution (6 selections)
- Fewest selections: Chivas USA; New York Red Bulls; Real Salt Lake (2 selections)

The 2007 MLS SuperDraft was held in Indianapolis, Indiana on January 12, 2007. It was the eighth annual Major League Soccer SuperDraft. The first selection belonged to expansion team Toronto FC.

The SuperDraft was followed by the 2007 MLS Supplemental Draft.

== Player selection ==
Key

*	Denotes a player contracted under the Generation Adidas program
^	Denotes player who has been selected to an MLS All-Star Game
§	Denotes a player who won the MLS Rookie of the Year
†	Denotes player who has been selected for an MLS Best XI team
~	Denotes a player who won the MLS MVP

=== Round one ===
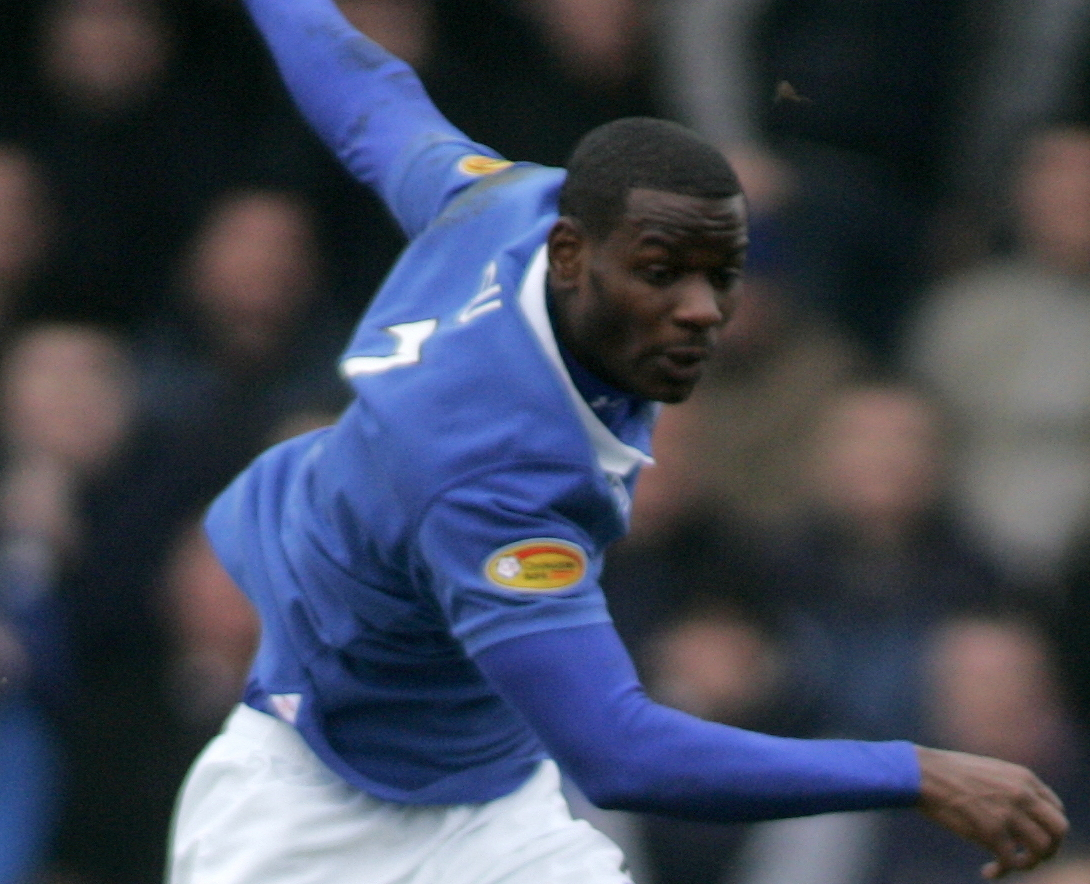
Toronto FC selected Maurice Edu 1st overall. the 2007 MLS Rookie of the Year earned 46 caps with the U..S national team and was selected to the 2010 FIFA World Cup squad.

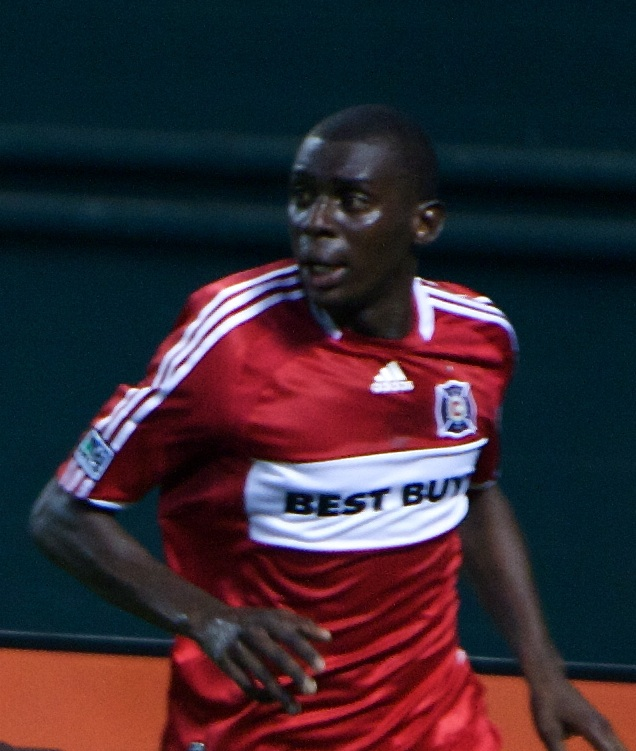
The Chicago Fire selected Bakary Soumaré 2nd overall. the 2008 MLS Best XI selection has earned 12 caps for the Mali national football team.

Pick #	MLS Team	Player	Position	Affiliation
1	Toronto FC	(United States) Maurice Edu*^§	M	Maryland
2	Chicago Fire (Note: #2: Columbus Crew → Chicago Fire. 2007-01-12: Chicago acquired this pick and forward Ryan Coiner from Columbus in exchange for forward Andy Herron. (Note: Mitchell, Shawn (January 13, 2007). "Crew fills its big need, sends top pick to Fire for goal-scorer". The Columbus Dispatch.))	(Mali) Bakary Soumaré*^†	D	Virginia
3	Kansas City Wizards	(United States) Michael Harrington	D	North Carolina
4	Real Salt Lake	(United States) Chris Seitz*	GK	Maryland
5	New England Revolution (Note: #5: Los Angeles Galaxy → New England Revolution. 2007-01-12: New England acquired this pick from Los Angeles in exchange for a partial allocation and a second-round selection in the 2008 MLS SuperDraft.)	(United States) Wells Thompson	M	Wake Forest
6	Colorado Rapids (Note: #6: New York Red Bulls → Colorado Rapids. 2006-04-21: Colorado acquired this pick, the #32 pick, and forward Thiago Martins from New York in exchange for forward Peguero Jean Philippe.)	(United States) Nico Colaluca*	M	Virginia
7	Chivas USA	(England) John Cunliffe	F	Fort Lewis College
8	Chicago Fire	(Angola) Jerson Monteiro	F	Alabama-Birmingham
9	FC Dallas	(United States) Anthony Wallace*	D/M	South Florida
10	Toronto FC (Note: #10: Colorado Rapids → Los Angeles Galaxy → Toronto FC. 2007-01-12: Toronto FC acquired this pick from Los Angeles in exchange for a partial allocation. Los Angeles had acquired this pick from Colorado in exchange for forward Jovan Kirovski on 2005-09-13.)	(New Zealand) Andrew Boyens	D	New Mexico
11	D.C. United	(United States) Bryan Arguez*	D/M	Generation adidas
12	New England Revolution	(United States) Amaechi Igwe*	D	Santa Clara
13	Houston Dynamo	(United States) John Michael Hayden	M	Indiana

=== Round two ===
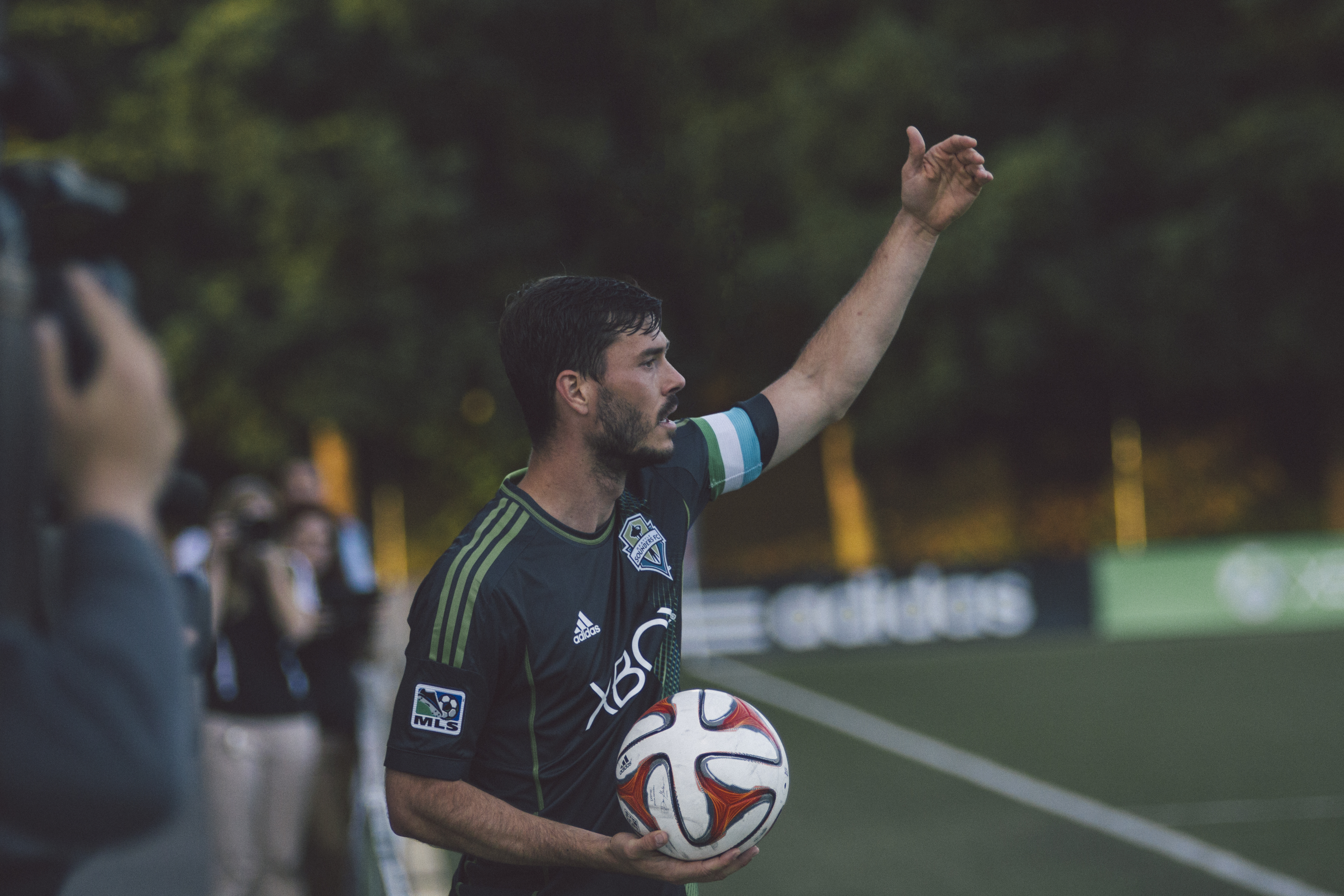
Columbus Crew selected Brad Evans15th overall. He earned 27 caps with the U.S. national team.

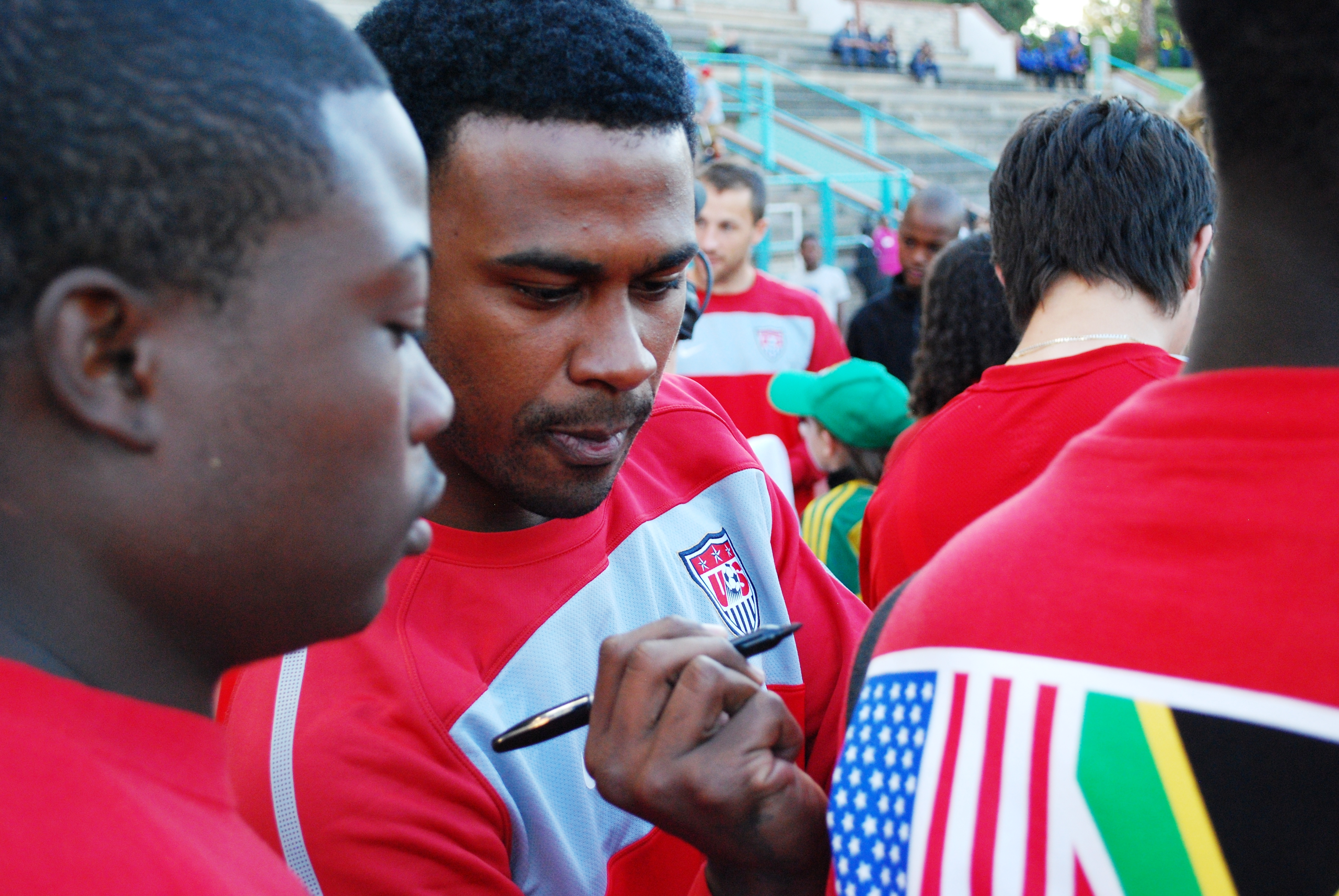
The LA Galaxy selected Robbie Findley 16th overall. He earned 11 caps with the U.S. national team and was selected to the 2010 FIFA World Cup squad.

Pick #	MLS Team	Player	Position	Affiliation
14	FC Dallas (Note: #14: Toronto FC → FC Dallas. 2006-11-17: FC Dallas acquired this pick and defender Adrian Serioux from Toronto in exchange for midfielder Ronnie O'Brien.)	(Ethiopia) Fuad Ibrahim*	F	Generation adidas
15	Columbus Crew	(United States) Brad Evans	M	UC Irvine
16	Los Angeles Galaxy (Note: #16: Kansas City Wizards → Los Angeles Galaxy. 2006-12-15: Los Angeles acquired this pick and a second-round selection in the 2008 MLS SuperDraft from Kansas City in exchange for goalkeeper Kevin Hartman.)	(United States) Robbie Findley	F	Oregon State
17	Colorado Rapids (Note: #17: Real Salt Lake → Colorado Rapids. 2005-02-23: Colorado acquired this pick from Real Salt Lake in exchange for forward Jordan Cila.)	(United States) Greg Dalby	M/D	Notre Dame
18	FC Dallas (Note: #18: Los Angeles Galaxy → Colorado Rapids → FC Dallas. 2007-01-12: FC Dallas acquired this pick and a second-round selection in the 2008 MLS SuperDraft from Colorado in exchange for defender Greg Vanney, salary cap considerations, and a third-round selection in the 2008 MLS SuperDraft. Colorado had acquired this pick, forward Herculez Gomez and defender Ugo Ihemelu from Los Angeles in exchange for the #23 pick and goalkeeper Joe Cannon on 2006-12-01.)	(United States) Andrew Daniels	D	Brown
19	New York Red Bulls	(Jamaica) Dane Richards	F	Clemson
20	Los Angeles Galaxy (Note: #20: Chivas USA → Real Salt Lake → Los Angeles Galaxy. 2005-06-29: Los Angeles acquired this pick from Real Salt Lake in exchange for defender Paul Broome. Real Salt Lake had acquired this pick from Chivas USA in exchange for defender Douglas Sequeira on 2005-02-25.)	(United States) Josh Tudela	M	Indiana
21	Chicago Fire	(United States) Nate Norman	M	Notre Dame
22	FC Dallas	(Guam) Ryan Guy	F	San Diego
23	Los Angeles Galaxy (Note: #23: Colorado Rapids → Los Angeles Galaxy. 2006-12-01: Los Angeles acquired this pick and goalkeeper Joe Cannon from Colorado in exchange for pick #18, forward Herculez Gomez and defender Ugo Ihemelu.)	(United States) Ty Harden	D	Washington
24	D.C. United	(United States) Brad North	F	Northwestern
25	New England Revolution	(United States) Ryan Solle	M	Wake Forest
26	Houston Dynamo	(United States) Corey Ashe^	M	North Carolina

=== Round three ===
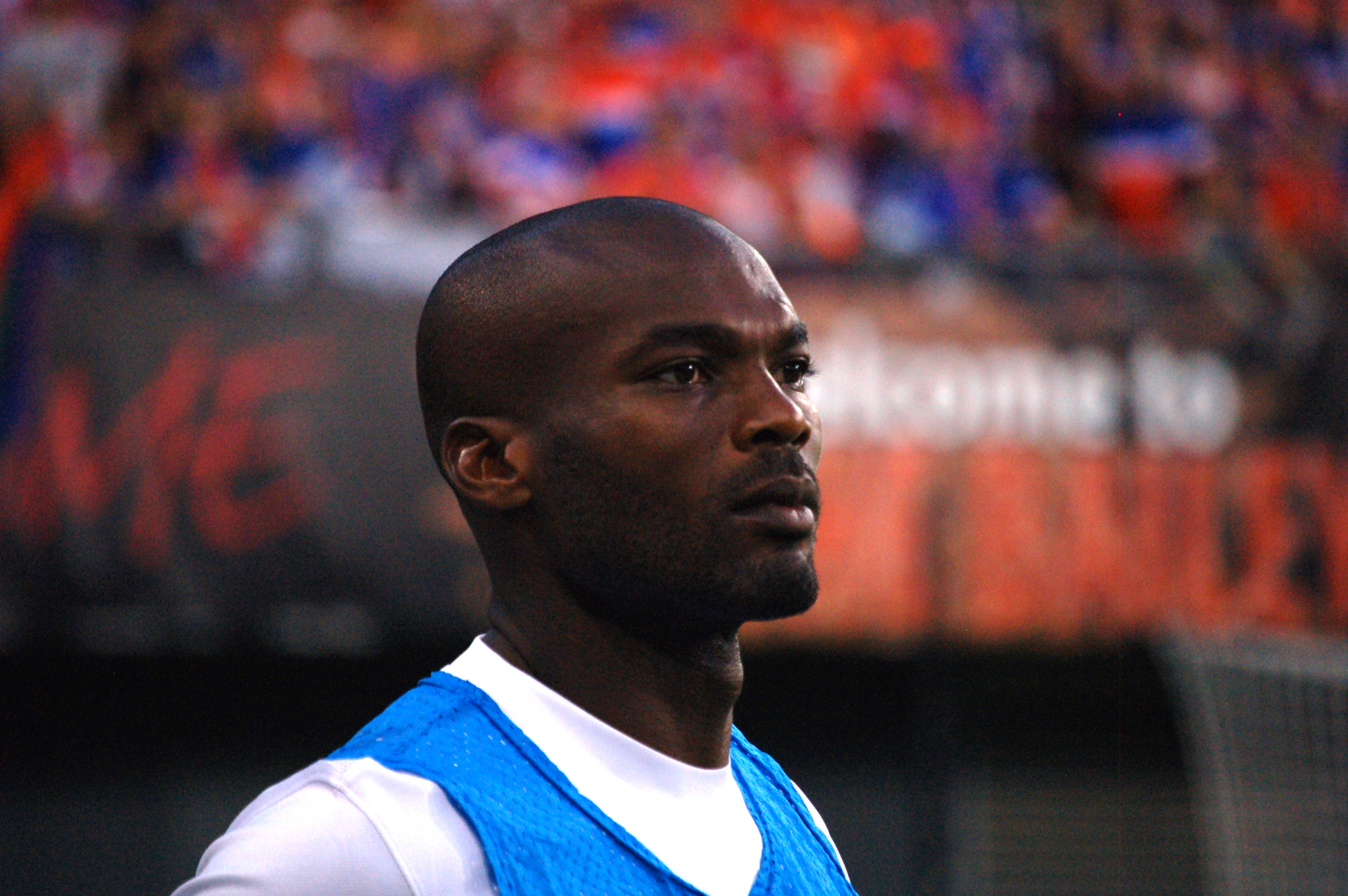
The Colorado Rapids selected Omar Cummings 31st overall. He earned 35 caps with the Jamaica national team.

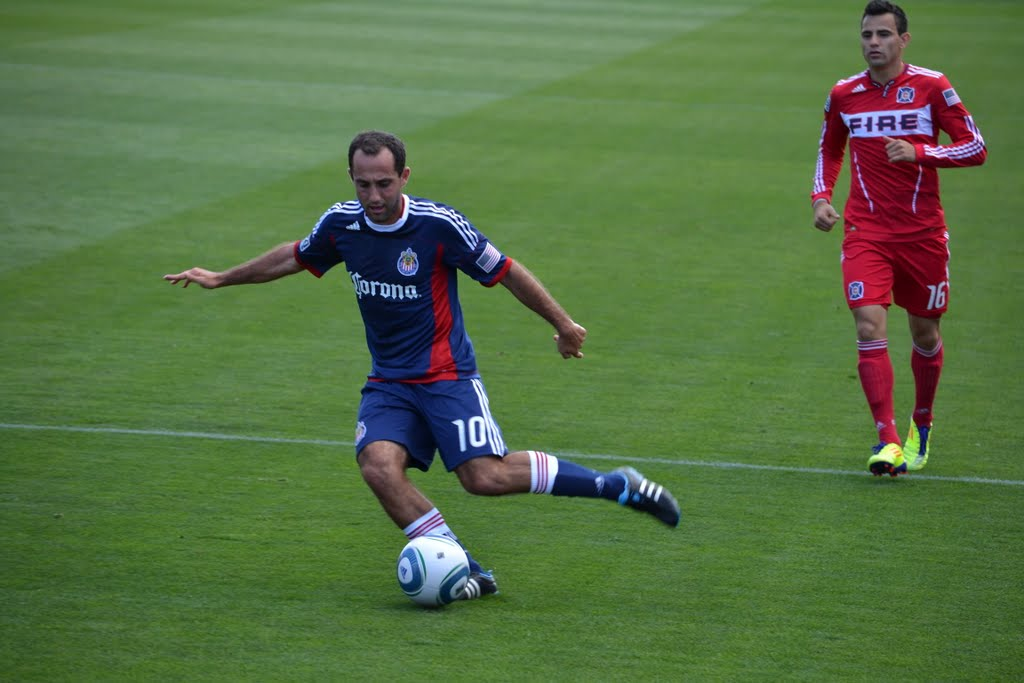
The Colorado Rapids selected 2011 MLS All-Star Nick LaBrocca 35th overall.

Pick #	MLS Team	Player	Position	Affiliation
27	Toronto FC	(Ghana) Richard Asante	D/M	Syracuse
28	FC Dallas (Note: #28: Columbus Crew → FC Dallas. 2006-01-20: FC Dallas acquired this pick from Columbus in exchange for a fourth-round selection in the 2006 MLS SuperDraft. (Note: Oller, Rob (January 21, 2006). "Crew drafts college player of year to bolster offense". The Columbus Dispatch.))	(Puerto Rico) Scott Jones	M	UNC-Greensboro
29	Kansas City Wizards	(United States) Edson Elcock	M	Old Dominion
30	Real Salt Lake	(United States) Steven Curfman	M	Wake Forest
31	Colorado Rapids (Note: #31: Los Angeles Galaxy → Colorado Rapids. 2006-04-07: Colorado acquired this pick from Los Angeles in exchange for forward Cornell Glen.)	(Jamaica) Omar Cummings	F	Cincinnati
32	D.C. United (Note: #32: New York Red Bulls → Colorado Rapids → D.C. United. 2006-12-15: D.C. United acquired this pick and a third-round selection in the 2008 MLS SuperDraft from Colorado in exchange for defender Brandon Prideaux. Colorado had acquired this pick, the #6 pick, and forward Thiago Martins from New York in exchange for forward Peguero Jean Philippe on 2006-04-21.)	(United States) Jay Needham	D	Southern Methodist
33	New York Red Bulls (Note: #33: Chivas USA → New England Revolution → Columbus Crew → Chivas USA → New York Red Bulls. 2006-11-27: New York acquired this pick and a designated player slot from Chivas USA in exchange for midfielder Amado Guevara. Chivas USA had re-acquired this pick (as a conditional pick) from Columbus in exchange for defender Ezra Hendrickson on 2006-04-28. Columbus had acquired this pick and a second-round selection in the 2006 MLS SuperDraft from New England in exchange for an allocation on 2006-01-20. New England had acquired this pick (as a conditional pick) and a second-round 2006 selection from Chivas USA in exchange for salary considerations on 2005-09-10.)	(Bosnia and Herzegovina) Siniša Ubiparipović	M	Akron
34	Chicago Fire	(United States) Mike Banner	M	SIU-Edwardsville
35	Colorado Rapids (Note: #35: FC Dallas → Colorado Rapids. 2006-02-14: Colorado acquired this pick and a third-round selection in the 2007 MLS Supplemental Draft from FC Dallas in exchange for the use of a Youth International slot in 2006. (Note: "Colorado Rapids Acquire Two Draft Picks in 2007 From FC Dallas". MLSSoccer.com. February 14, 2006.))	(United States) Nick LaBrocca	M	Rutgers
36	Colorado Rapids	(United States) Justin Hughes	GK	North Carolina
37	D.C. United	(United States) Ricky Schramm	F	Georgetown
38	New England Revolution	(Republic of Ireland) Bryan Byrne	M	UC Santa Barbara
39	Houston Dynamo	(United States) Mike Sambursky	F	South Carolina

=== Round four ===
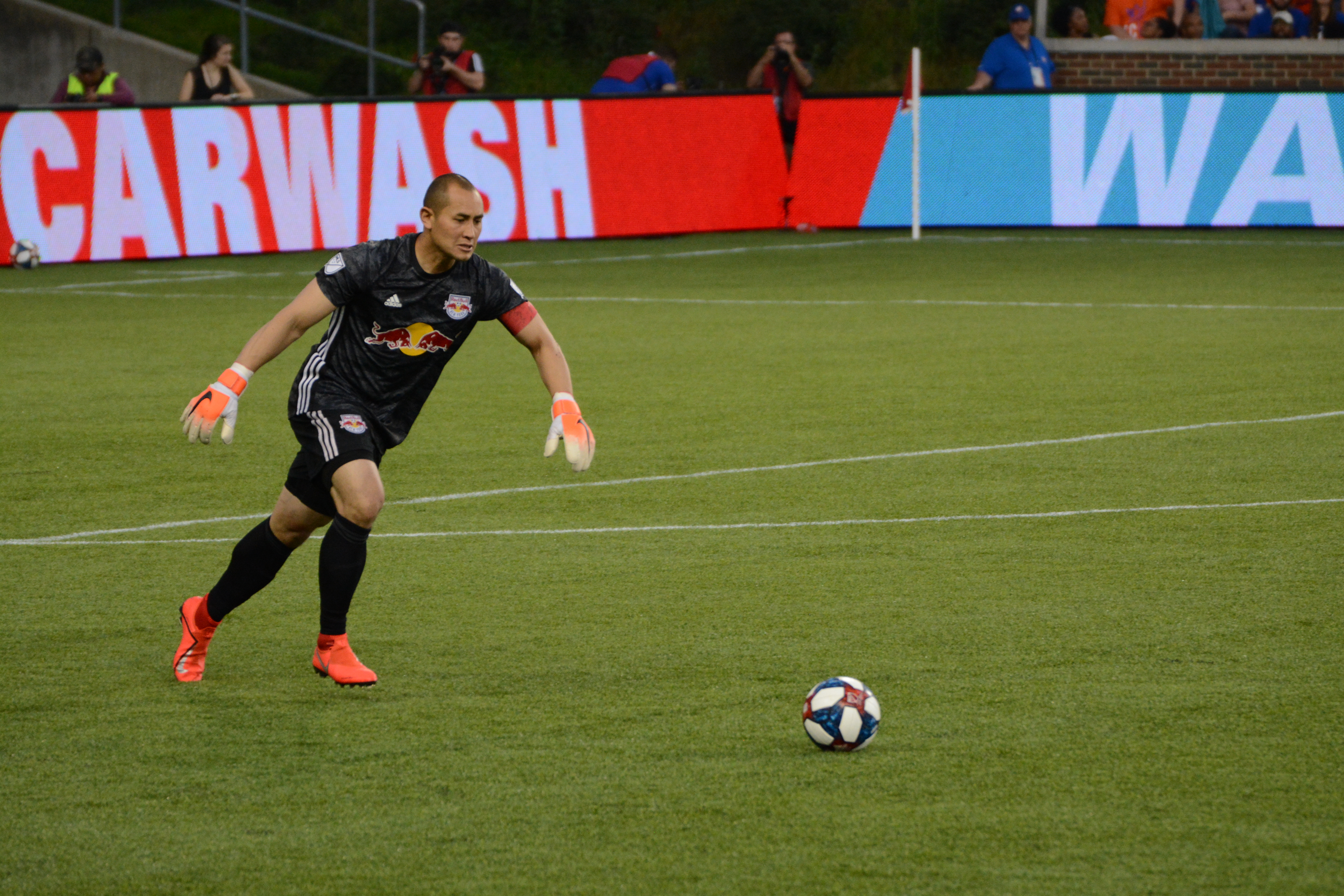
D.C. United selected Luis Robles 50th overall. In 2015, he was the MLS Goalkeeper of the Year and named to the MLS Best XI.

Pick #	MLS Team	Player	Position	Affiliation
40	Toronto FC	(Canada) Jeffrey Gonsalves	F	Rhode Island
41	Columbus Crew	(United States) Aaron Chandler	F	San Francisco
42	Kansas City Wizards	(Costa Rica) Kurt Morsink	M	James Madison
43	FC Dallas (Note: #43: Real Salt Lake → FC Dallas. 2005-01-19: FC Dallas acquired this pick from Real Salt Lake in exchange for the rights to defender Brian Dunseth.)	(Croatia) Tommy Krizanovic	F	Jacksonville
44	Los Angeles Galaxy	(United States) Tally Hall^	GK	San Diego State
45	Los Angeles Galaxy (Note: #45: New York Red Bulls → Los Angeles Galaxy. 2006-08-17: Los Angeles acquired this pick and a second-round selection in the 2008 MLS SuperDraft from New York in exchange for forward John Wolyniec.)	(United States) Bobby Burling	D	Loyola Marymount
46	Chivas USA	(United States) Cameron Dunn	D	UC Irvine
47	Chicago Fire	(Morocco) Simon Omekanda	F	Penn State
48	New England Revolution (Note: #48: FC Dallas → Real Salt Lake → New England Revolution. 2007-01-12: New England acquired this pick from Real Salt Lake in exchange for forward Kyle Brown. Earlier the same day, Real Salt Lake had acquired this pick from FC Dallas in exchange for a fourth-round selection in the 2008 MLS SuperDraft.)	(United States) Adam Cristman	F	Virginia
49	Columbus Crew (Note: #49: Colorado Rapids → Columbus Crew. 2006-01-20: Columbus acquired this pick, originally a conditional pick, from Colorado in exchange for defender Chris Wingert. The pick became a fourth-rounder when Wingert failed to start 8 games for Colorado in 2006.)	(England) Ben Hunter	F	North Carolina
50	D.C. United	(United States) Luis Robles†	GK	Portland
51	New England Revolution	(United States) Kyle Helton	D	Duke
52	Houston Dynamo	(United States) Eric Ebert	M	California

== Notable undrafted players ==
- Kenny Schoeni

== See also ==
- Draft (sports)
- Generation Adidas
- Major League Soccer
- MLS SuperDraft
