= Patriots Park (Columbia County, Georgia) =

Patriot's Park
- Interactive map of Patriot's Park
- Location: Columbia Road, Grovetown, GA
- Coordinates: 33.521433°N 82.229356°W
- Created: 1994

Patriots Park is a multi-purpose recreational facility that is home to different sports' fields, parks, and courts. The main gym and facilities were built in 1994. The main function of this facility is for recreational sports and other various team activities.

== Location and operation time ==
Patriots Park is located in Grovetown, Georgia, which is a suburb about 20 minutes outside of Augusta. This Park is at 5445 Columbia Road in Columbia County; having an entrance on William Few Parkway and Columbia Road. The park is opened 7 days a week, from 7:30am–9:00pm Mon-Thur,7:30am–6:00pm Fri,9:00am–4:00pm Sat, and 1:00pm–6:00pm on Sundays.

== History ==
Patriots Park was opened in 1992, but construction of the gym and its main facilities was completed in 1994. In 1999, the county passed a draft to increase the size of the gym by about 10,000 square feet. This expansion added two full-size basketball courts (which can also be viewed as four volleyball courts) and new dressing rooms outside the courts. It was completed in October 1999, with visions of a bigger renovation for the next year. The third phase of the gymnasium project will include even more additions to the gymnasium with the likes of racquetball courts and office space. Throughout many times, there have been complaints with the number of parking spots available for the sports and other activities taking place. In 2003, there were 80 soccer teams playing in the same season which led to many overflows of parking and led to parents parking in the grass. There was never an increase in parking spots, but the help came in the form of Columbia County building a new park a few miles down the road to help alleviate the congestion. The addition of Blanchard Woods Park helped minimally with parking, as to this day, people still park illegally on grass and on the side of the road.

== Recreational uses ==
Patriots Park supports many different sports including basketball, football, soccer, baseball, softball, tennis, disc golf, volleyball, and racquet ball. It is the home to the Columbia County Recreational Department and has recreational teams in soccer, baseball, softball and football. There is an 18 hole disc golf course that circles around the park and goes through the woods. It was created in 1999 and is free to play. Using the gym requires a membership. The soccer, football, baseball, and softball fields are used for youth recreational sports. Patriots Park has been home to five Dixie World Series in youth baseball and softball, and the World Series for the Dixie Fast Pitch Ponytails and Bells. Annually, the park is used to host a firework show on the Fourth of July, or around the Fourth of July for Independence Day. It is the largest firework show in Columbia County.
