= 1961 International Soccer League =

International Soccer League
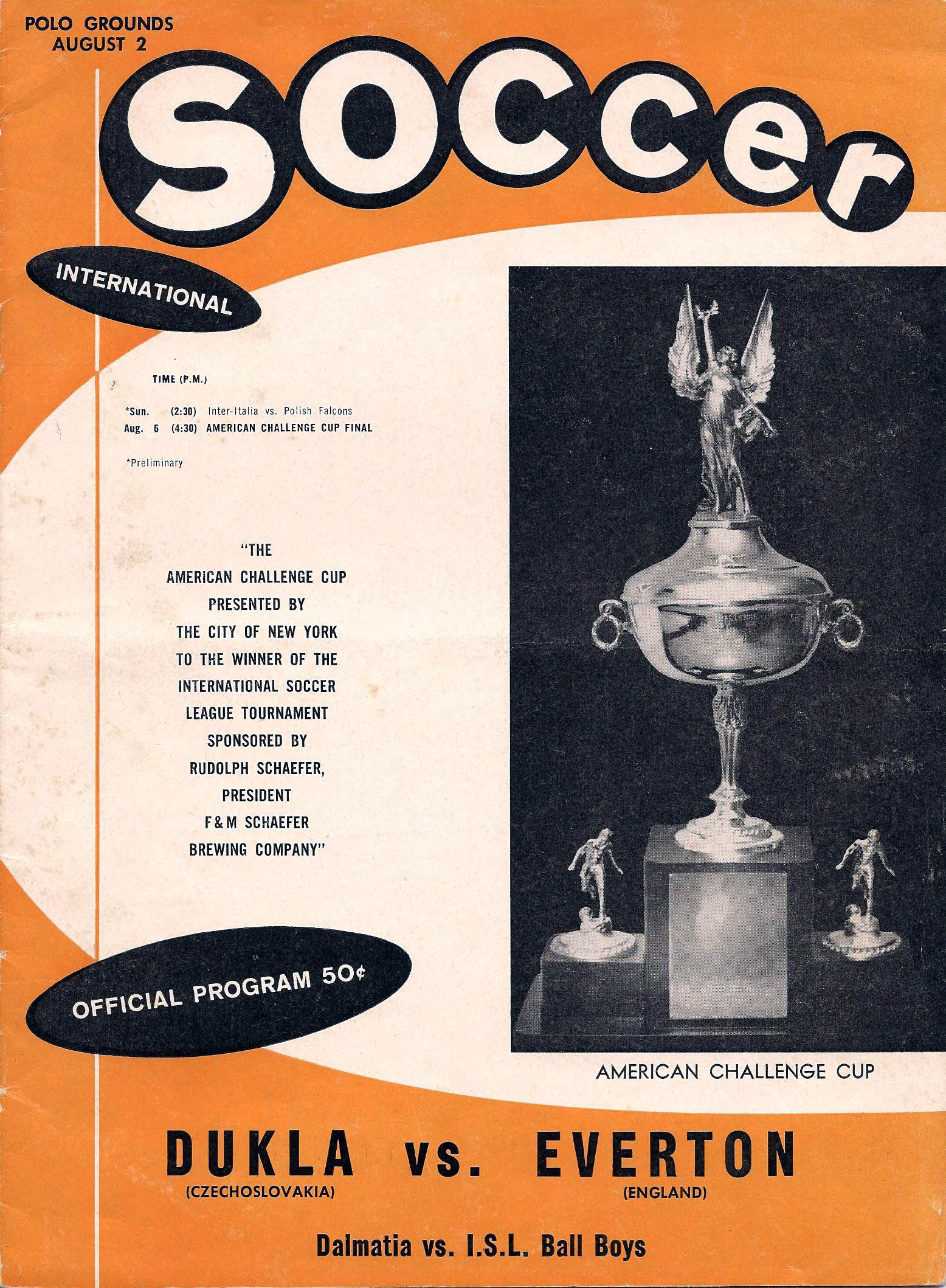
- Official programme for the final
- Season: 1961
- Teams: 16
- Champions: (Czechoslovakia) Dukla Prague
- Top goalscorer: Rudolf Kučera (15 goals)

The 1961 season was the second edition of the International Soccer League. Played in the United States and Canada by teams invited from Europe, the tournament featured two groups of eight teams, who played a round-robin format. The final, held in August, was a two-legged tie between the winner of each group to decide the overall champion.

== League standings ==
=== Section I ===
Pos	Team	Pld	W	D	L	GF	GA	GD	Pts
1	(England) Everton	7	6	0	1	22	5	+17	12
2	(Brazil) Bangu	7	4	1	2	18	8	+10	9
3	(United States) New York Americans	7	4	0	3	13	18	−5	8
4	(Germany) Karlsruher SC	7	3	1	3	16	17	−1	7
5	(Scotland) Kilmarnock	7	2	2	3	12	13	−1	6
6	(Canada) Montreal Concordia	7	2	1	4	7	11	−4	5
7	(Romania) Dinamo București	7	1	3	3	8	14	−6	5
8	(Turkey) Beşiktaş	7	1	2	4	8	19	−11	4

Rules for classification: 1) points; 2) goal difference; 3) number of goals scored.

17 May	Beşiktaş	3–1	Karlsruhe	New York, NY
	Şenol Birol		Reinhold Wischnowsky	Stadium: Polo Grounds; Attendance: 9538; Referee: Peter Rhodes

25 May	Everton	2–1	Kilmarnock FC	Montreal, QC
		news		Stadium: Molson Stadium; Attendance: 6,000

28 May	Bangu	6–1	Beşiktaş	New York, NY
	Zé Maria 30'; Valter dos Santos 8' 28'; Ademir da Guia 34'		Goal	Stadium: Polo Grounds; Attendance: 7130

23 May	Montreal Concordia	0–1	Everton	Montreal, QC
	Hector Lopez (red card) 87'	Preview post	Billy Bingham (red card) 22'; Alec Young 72'	Stadium: Molson Stadium; Attendance: 8,000; Referee: Cameron McShane

30 May	Montreal Concordia	2–0	Dinamo Bucharest	Montreal, QC
	Tito Maule 25'; Apard Kiraly 50'	news		Stadium: Molson Stadium; Referee: Peter Rhodes

30 May	New York Americans	1–0	Beşiktaş	New York, NY
	Raul Seoane			Stadium: Polo Grounds; Attendance: 10212

30 May	Karlsruher SC	3–2	Kilmarnock FC

1 June	Kilmarnock FC	4–0	New York Americans	Montreal, QC
7:00pm	Hughie Brown (31'); Andy Kerr (43'); Bert Black (65'); Matt Watson (84')	news		Stadium: Molson Stadium; Attendance: 7000

1 June	Montreal Concordia	1–1	Beşiktaş	Montreal, QC
9:00pm	José Sanches 48'		Şenol Birol 15'	Stadium: Molson Stadium; Attendance: 5500; Referee: Peter Rhodes

8 June	Kilmarnock	1–1	Beşiktaş	Montreal, QC
	Billy Muir 12'		Selim Soydan 7'	Stadium: Molson Stadium; Referee: Tom Cuthbert

14 June	Everton	4–0	Beşiktaş	New York, NY
	Bobby Collins; Frank Wignall; Alex Young			Stadium: Polo Grounds; Attendance: 5000; Referee: John Best

18 June	Dinamo București	5–2	Beşiktaş	New York, NY
	Constantin David; Iosif Varga; Constantin Frățilă		Şenol Birol; Arif Özataç	Stadium: Polo Grounds; Attendance: 7331; Referee: Peter Rhodes

=== Section II ===
Pos	Team	Pld	W	D	L	GF	GA	GD	Pts
1	(Czechoslovakia) Dukla Prague	7	6	1	0	36	6	+30	13
2	(Canada) Montreal Concordia	7	3	4	0	17	10	+7	10
3	AS Monaco	7	4	0	3	18	13	+5	8
4	(Socialist Federal Republic of Yugoslavia) Red Star Belgrade	7	3	1	3	24	17	+7	7
5	(Spain) RCD Español	7	3	1	3	15	19	−4	7
6	(Austria) Rapid Wien	7	2	1	4	12	18	−6	5
7	(Republic of Ireland) Shamrock Rovers	7	1	2	4	12	26	−14	4
8	(Israel) Hapoel Petah Tikva	7	0	2	5	6	31	−25	2

Rules for classification: 1) points; 2) goal difference; 3) number of goals scored.

15 June	Shamrock Rovers	2–2	Hapoel Petah Tikva	New York, NY
	Frank O'Neill		Zaharia Ratzabi; Nahum Stelmach	Stadium: Polo Grounds; Attendance: 12,244; Referee: Nels Dahlquist

27 June	Dukla Prague	4–2	Red Star Belgrade	Montreal, QC
	Josef Masopust 24'; Rudolf Kučera 81', 84'; Svatopluk Pluskal 88'		Vojislav Melić 14'; Branko Zebec 90'	Attendance: 12,000; Referee: Bel Betts

27 June	Montreal Concordia	4–0	Hapoel Petah Tikva	Montreal, QC
	Humberto Gambaro 40', 44'; Ken Leek 51'; Sam Lawrie 88'			Stadium: Molson Stadium; Attendance: 10,000

2 July	Dukla Prague	7–1	Hapoel Petah Tikva	New York, NY
	Svatopluk Pluskal; Rudolf Kučera; Jaroslav Borovička; Josef Vacenovský		Zecharia Ratzabi	Referee: Mohl

2 July	AS Monaco	3–2	Rapid Wien

4 July	Montreal Concordia	1–1	RCD Español	Montreal, QC
	Sam Lawrie 67'		Antonio Camps 7'	Stadium: Molson Stadium; Attendance: 4,500

4 July	Shamrock Rovers	1–4	AS Monaco	New York, NY
	Frank O'Neill 23'		Bart Carlier 53'; Lucien Cossou 60'; Henri Biancheri 64'; Claude Peretti 72'	Stadium: Polo Grounds; Attendance: 8,615; Referee: Nels Dahlquist

4 July	Dukla Prague	6–0	Rapid Wien

6 July	RCD Español	3–1	AS Monaco
	José Sastre; Ramón Carranza; Índio Da Luz		Claude Peretti

6 July	Montreal Concordia	2–2	Dukla Prague	Montreal, QC
	Tommy Barrett 26' (pen.); Ken Leek 42'		Josef Jelínek 25'; Josef Vacenovský 65'

9 July	Montreal Concordia	2–2	Red Star Belgrade

9 July	Shamrock Rovers	1–4	RCD Español	New York, NY
	Liam Tuohy (footballer) 68'		Índio Da Luz 18', 28'; Ramón Carranza 61'; Ronnie Nolan 69' (o.g.)	Stadium: Polo Grounds; Attendance: 10,208; Referee: Nels Dahlquist

11 July	Montreal Concordia	3–2	Rapid Wien	Montreal, QC
	Humberto Gambaro 21'; Tommy Barrett 31' (pen.); Ron Heckman 87'		Rudi Flögel 4'; Walter Seitl 9'	Stadium: Molson Stadium; Attendance: 4,500; Referee: Mike Devine

12 July	Red Star Belgrade	7–2	RCD Español	New York, NY
				Attendance: 17,000

12 July	Dukla Prague	2–0	AS Monaco	New York, NY
	Josef Vacenovský 6'; Josef Jelínek 41'			Attendance: 17,000

16 July	Shamrock Rovers	5–1	Red Star Belgrade	New York, NY
	Tony Byrne; Paddy Ambrose; Frank O'Neill; Liam Tuohy		Novak Tomić	Stadium: Polo Grounds; Attendance: 10,701; Referee: William Peters

16 July	Dukla Prague	5–1	RCD Español	New York, NY
	Josef Vacenovský 31'; Josef Masopust 64'; Rudolf Kučera 67', 78'; Josef Jelínek 89'		Índio Da Luz 8'	Stadium: Polo Grounds; Attendance: 10,701; Referee: George Mohl

18 July	Montreal Concordia	3–1	AS Monaco	Montreal, QC
	Humberto Gambaro; Jose Sanches		Bert Carlier	Stadium: Molson Stadium; Attendance: 4,500

19 July	Shamrock Rovers	1–3	SK Rapid Wien	New York, NY
	Frank O'Neill 79'		Josef Höltl 3'; Walter Seitl 35'; Rudi Flögel 74'	Stadium: Polo Grounds; Attendance: 10,701; Referee: Jim McLean

20 July	Red Star Belgrade	7–0	Hapoel Petah Tikva

23 July	AS Monaco	3–0	Hapoel Petah Tikva

23 July	SK Rapid Wien	3–0	RCD Español

24 July	Montreal Concordia	2–2	Shamrock Rovers	Montreal, QC
	Olivio Lacerdo 38'; José Sanches 51'		Liam Hennessy 29'; Tommy Hamilton 59'	Stadium: Molson Stadium; Attendance: 400

30 July	Shamrock Rovers	0–10	Dukla Prague	New York, NY
			Rudolf Kučera; Josef Vacenovský; Josef Masopust; Jan Brumovský; Jaroslav Borovička	Stadium: Polo Grounds; Attendance: 5,180; Referee: Leo Goldstein

30 July	Rapid Wien	2–2	Hapoel Petah Tikva	Fall River, MA

30 July	AS Monaco	4–2	Red Star Belgrade	Fall River, MA

== Championship finals ==
=== First leg ===
2 August 1961
16:30

Dukla Prague (Czechoslovakia)	7–2	(England) Everton
Rudolf Kučera; Josef Jelínek; Jaroslav Borovička; Jan Brumovský; Josef Masopust		Roy Vernon; Alex Young

Polo Grounds, New York City

=== Second leg ===
6 August 1961

Dukla Prague (Czechoslovakia)	2–0	(England) Everton
Rudolf Kučera; Jan Brumovský

Polo Grounds, New York City

Team details

Dukla Prague
Everton

Dukla Prague won 9–2 on aggregate.
