= Beşiktaş J.K. in European football =

Turkish club in European football

Beşiktaş J.K. is a professional sports club based in the Beşiktaş district of Istanbul, Turkey. After winning the 1957–58 Federation Cup, a tournament that was held to designate Turkey's representative in the European Cup, the club first participated in the European Cup in 1958. Since then, Beşiktaş have regularly participated in European tournaments. The club managed to reach the quarter-finals of the 1986–87 European Cup, 2002–03 UEFA Cup, and 2016–17 UEFA Europa League.

In the following tables the first score is always that of Beşiktaş.

== Overall record ==
Accurate as of 22 October 2026

Competition	Pld	W	D	L	GF	GA	GD	Win%
European Cup / Champions League	89	27	19	43	89	153	−64	30.34
UEFA Cup Winners' Cup	20	4	4	12	21	38	−17	20.00
UEFA Cup / UEFA Europa League	142	64	26	52	226	186	+40	45.07
UEFA Conference League	16	9	2	5	29	24	+5	56.25
Total	267	104	51	112	365	401	−36	38.95

== Best campaigns ==
Season	Achievement	Notes
European Cup / UEFA Champions League
1986–87	Quarter-finals	eliminated by Dynamo Kyiv 0–2 in İzmir, 0–5 in Kyiv
European Cup Winners' Cup
1993–94	Last 16	eliminated by Ajax 1–2 in Amsterdam, 0–4 in Istanbul
1994–95	Last 16	eliminated by Auxerre 2–2 in Istanbul, 0–2 in Auxerre
1998–99	Last 16	eliminated by Vålerenga 0–1 in Oslo, 3–3 in Istanbul
UEFA Cup / UEFA Europa League
2002–03	Quarter-finals	eliminated by Lazio 0–1 in Rome, 1–2 in Istanbul
2016–17	Quarter-finals	eliminated by Lyon 1–2 in Lyon, 2–1 in regular time and 6–7 on penalties in Istanbul

== European Cup / UEFA Champions League ==
The European Cup was inaugurated in 1955, and Beşiktaş entered this competition for the first time in 1958, after winning the 1957–58 Federation Cup. The major success of the club is to play in the quarter-finals of 1986–87 European Cup, where they were eliminated by then-Soviet champions Dynamo Kyiv. After the European Cup became the Champions League in 1992, Beşiktaş managed to play in the group stage six times, reaching the knockout stage once in 2018.

Season	Round	Opposing team	Home	Away	Aggregate	Reference
1958–59	Preliminary round	(Greece) Olympiacos	Olympiacos withdrew ^{[A]}			
1958–59	First round	(Spain) Real Madrid	1–1	0–2	1–3	
1960–61	Preliminary round	(Austria) Rapid Wien	1–0	0–4	1–4	
1966–67	First round	(Netherlands) Ajax	1–2	0–2	1–4	
1967–68	First round	(Austria) Rapid Wien	0–1	0–3	0–4	
1982–83	First round	(England) Aston Villa	0–0	1–3	1–3	
1986–87	First round	(Albania) Dinamo Tirana	2–0	1–0	3–0	
1986–87	Second round	(Cyprus) APOEL	APOEL withdrew ^{[B]}			
1986–87	Quarter-final	(Soviet Union) Dynamo Kyiv	0–5	0–2	0–7	
1990–91	First round	(Sweden) Malmö FF	2–2	2–3	4–5	
1991–92	First round	(Netherlands) PSV Eindhoven	1–1	1–2	2–3	
1992–93	First round	(Sweden) Göteborg	2–1	0–2	2–3	
1995–96	Qualifying round	(Norway) Rosenborg	3–1	0–3	3–4	
1997–98	Second qualifying round	(Slovenia) Maribor	0–0	3–1	3–1	
1997–98	Group E	(Germany) Bayern Munich	0–2	0–2	3rd	
1997–98	Group E	(France) Paris Saint-Germain	3–1	1–2	3rd	
1997–98	Group E	(Sweden) Göteborg	1–0	1–2	3rd	
1999–2000	Second qualifying round	(Israel) Hapoel Haifa	1–1	0–0	1–1 (a)	
2000–01	Second qualifying round	(Bulgaria) Levski Sofia	1–0	1–1	2–1	
2000–01	Third qualifying round	(Russia) Lokomotiv Moscow	3–0	3–1	6–1	
2000–01	Group H	(Italy) Milan	0–2	1–4	4th	
2000–01	Group H	(England) Leeds United	0–0	0–6	4th	
2000–01	Group H	(Spain) Barcelona	3–0	0–5	4th	
2003–04	Group G	(England) Chelsea	0–2	2–0	3rd	
2003–04	Group G	(Czech Republic) Sparta Prague	1–0	1–2	3rd	
2003–04	Group G	(Italy) Lazio	0–2	1–1	3rd	
2007–08	Second qualifying round	(Moldova) Sheriff Tiraspol	1–0	3–0	4–0	
2007–08	Third qualifying round	(Switzerland) Zürich	2–0	1–1	3–1	
2007–08	Group A	(Portugal) Porto	0–1	0–2	4th	
2007–08	Group A	(England) Liverpool	2–1	0–8	4th	
2007–08	Group A	(France) Marseille	2–1	0–2	4th	
2009–10	Group B	(England) Manchester United	0–1	1–0	4th	
2009–10	Group B	(Russia) CSKA Moscow	1–2	1–2	4th	
2009–10	Group B	(Germany) VfL Wolfsburg	0–3	0–0	4th	
2014–15	Third qualifying round	(Netherlands) Feyenoord	3–1	2–1	5–2	
2014–15	Play-off round	(England) Arsenal	0–0	0–1	0–1	
2016–17	Group B	(Italy) Napoli	1–1	3–2	3rd	
2016–17	Group B	(Portugal) Benfica	3–3	1–1	3rd	
2016–17	Group B	(Ukraine) Dynamo Kyiv	1–1	0–6	3rd	
2017–18	Group G	(Portugal) Porto	1–1	3–1	1st	
2017–18	Group G	(Germany) RB Leipzig	2–0	2–1	1st	
2017–18	Group G	(France) Monaco	1–1	2–1	1st	
2017–18	Round of 16	(Germany) Bayern Munich	1–3	0–5	1–8	
2020–21	Second qualifying round	(Greece) PAOK	—N/a	1–3	1–3	
2021–22	Group C	(Netherlands) Ajax	1–2	0–2	4th	
2021–22	Group C	(Portugal) Sporting CP	1–4	0–4	4th	
2021–22	Group C	(Germany) Borussia Dortmund	1–2	0–5	4th	

== UEFA Cup Winners' Cup ==
Season	Round	Opposing team	Home	Away	Agg.	Reference
1975–76	First round	(Italy) Fiorentina	0–3	0–3	0–6	
1977–78	First round	(Hungary) Diósgyőri	2–0	0–5	2–5	
1984–85	First round	(Austria) Rapid Wien	1–1	1–4	2–5	
1989–90	First round	(West Germany) Borussia Dortmund	0–1	1–2	1–3	
1993–94	First round	(Slovakia) Košice	2–0	1–2	3–2	
1993–94	Second round	(Netherlands) Ajax	0–4	1–2	1–6	
1994–95	First round	(Finland) HJK	2–0	1–1	3–1	
1994–95	Second round	(France) Auxerre	2–2	0–2	2–4	
1998–99	First round	(Slovakia) Spartak Trnava	3–0	1–2	4–2	
1998–99	Second round	(Norway) Vålerenga	3–3	0–1	3–4	

== UEFA Cup / UEFA Europa League ==
Season	Round	Opposing team	Home	Away	Agg.	Reference
1974–75	First round	(Romania) Steagul Roșu Brașov	2–0	0–3	2–3	
1985–86	First round	(Spain) Athletic Bilbao	0–1	1–4	1–5	
1987–88	First round	(Italy) Inter Milan	0–0	1–3	1–3	
1988–89	First round	(Socialist Federal Republic of Yugoslavia) Dinamo Zagreb	1–0	0–2	1–2	
1996–97	Qualifying round	(Belarus) Dinamo Minsk	2–0	1–2	3–2	
1996–97	First round	(Belgium) Molenbeek	3–0	0–0	3–0	
1996–97	Second round	(Poland) Legia Warsaw	2–1	1–1	3–2	
1996–97	Third round	(Spain) Valencia	2–2	1–3	3–5	
2002–03	First round	(Bosnia and Herzegovina) Sarajevo	2–2	5–0	7–2	
2002–03	Second round	(Spain) Alavés	1–0	1–1	2–1	
2002–03	Third round	(Ukraine) Dynamo Kyiv	3–1	0–0	3–1	
2002–03	Fourth round	(Czech Republic) Slavia Prague	4–2	0–1	4–3	
2002–03	Quarter-final	(Italy) Lazio	1–2	0–1	1–3	
2003–04	Third round	(Spain) Valencia	0–2	2–3	2–5	
2004–05	First round	(Norway) Bodø/Glimt	1–0	1–1	2–1	
2004–05	Group B	(Spain) Athletic Bilbao	3–1	—N/a	4th	
2004–05	Group B	(Romania) Steaua București	—N/a	1–2	4th	
2004–05	Group B	(Italy) Parma	—N/a	2–3	4th	
2004–05	Group B	(Belgium) Standard Liège	1–1	—N/a	4th	
2005–06	Second qualifying round	(Liechtenstein) Vaduz	5–1	1–0	6–1	
2005–06	First round	(Sweden) Malmö FF	0–1	4–1	4–2	
2005–06	Group H	(Spain) Sevilla	—N/a	0–3	4th	
2005–06	Group H	(Russia) Zenit Saint Petersburg	1–1	—N/a	4th	
2005–06	Group H	(England) Bolton Wanderers	1–1	—N/a	4th	
2005–06	Group H	(Portugal) Vitória	—N/a	3–1	4th	
2006–07	First round	(Bulgaria) CSKA Sofia	2–0	2–2 (a.e.t.)	4–2	
2006–07	Group B	(England) Tottenham Hotspur	0–2	—N/a	4th	
2006–07	Group B	(Romania) Dinamo București	—N/a	1–2	4th	
2006–07	Group B	(Germany) Bayer Leverkusen	—N/a	1–2	4th	
2006–07	Group B	(Belgium) Club Brugge	2–1	—N/a	4th	
2008–09	Second qualifying round	(Bosnia and Herzegovina) Široki Brijeg	4–0	2–1	6–1	
2008–09	First round	(Ukraine) Metalist Kharkiv	1–0	1–4	2–4	
2010–11	Second qualifying round	(Faroe Islands) Víkingur	3–0	4–0	7–0	
2010–11	Third qualifying round	(Czech Republic) Viktoria Plzeň	3–0	1–1	4–1	
2010–11	Play-off round	(Finland) HJK Helsinki	2–0	4–0	6–0	
2010–11	Group L	(Portugal) Porto	1–3	1–1	2nd	
2010–11	Group L	(Austria) Rapid Wien	2–0	2–1	2nd	
2010–11	Group L	(Bulgaria) CSKA Sofia	1–0	2–1	2nd	
2010–11	Round of 32	(Ukraine) Dynamo Kyiv	1–4	0–4	1–8	
2011–12	Play-off round	(Russia) Alania	3–0	0–2	3–2	
2011–12	Group E	(England) Stoke City	3–1	1–2	1st	
2011–12	Group E	(Ukraine) Dynamo Kyiv	1–0	0–1	1st	
2011–12	Group E	(Israel) Maccabi Tel Aviv	5–1	3–2	1st	
2011–12	Round of 32	(Portugal) Braga	0–1	2–0	2–1	
2011–12	Round of 16	(Spain) Atlético Madrid	0–3	1–3	1–6	
2013–14	Play-off round	(Norway) Tromsø	2–0	1–2	3–2 ^{[C]}	
2014–15	Group C	(England) Tottenham Hotspur	1–0	1–1	1st	
2014–15	Group C	(Greece) Asteras Tripolis	1–1	2–2	1st	
2014–15	Group C	(Serbia) Partizan	2–1	4–0	1st	
2014–15	Round of 32	(England) Liverpool	1–0 (a.e.t.)	0–1	1–1 (5–4 p)	
2014–15	Round of 16	(Belgium) Club Brugge	1–3	1–2	2–5	
2015–16	Group H	(Russia) Lokomotiv Moscow	1–1	1–1	3rd	
2015–16	Group H	(Portugal) Sporting CP	1–1	1–3	3rd	
2015–16	Group H	(Albania) Skënderbeu	2–0	1–0	3rd	
2016–17	Round of 32	(Israel) Hapoel Be'er Sheva	2–1	3–1	5–2	
2016–17	Round of 16	(Greece) Olympiacos	4–1	1–1	5–2	
2016–17	Quarter-final	(France) Lyon	2–1 (a.e.t.)	1–2	3–3 (6–7 p)	
2018–19	Second qualifying round	(Faroe Islands) B36 Tórshavn	6–0	2–0	8–0	
2018–19	Third qualifying round	(Austria) LASK	1–0	1–2	2–2 (a)	
2018–19	Play-off round	(Serbia) Partizan	3–0	1–1	4–1	
2018–19	Group I	(Belgium) Genk	2–4	1–1	3rd	
2018–19	Group I	(Sweden) Malmö	0–1	0–2	3rd	
2018–19	Group I	(Norway) Sarpsborg 08	3–1	3–2	3rd	
2019–20	Group K	(Portugal) Braga	1–2	1–3	4th	
2019–20	Group K	(England) Wolverhampton Wanderers	0–1	0–4	4th	
2019–20	Group K	(Slovakia) Slovan Bratislava	2–1	2–4	4th	
2020–21	Third qualifying round	(Portugal) Rio Ave	1–1 (a.e.t.)	—N/a	1–1 (2–4 p)	
2024–25	Play-off round	(Switzerland) Lugano	5–1	3–3	8–4	
2024–25	League phase	(Netherlands) Ajax	—N/a	0–4	28th	
2024–25	League phase	(Germany) Eintracht Frankfurt	1–3	—N/a	28th	
2024–25	League phase	(France) Lyon	—N/a	1–0	28th	
2024–25	League phase	(Sweden) Malmö FF	2–1	—N/a	28th	
2024–25	League phase	(Israel) Maccabi Tel Aviv	1–3	—N/a	28th	
2024–25	League phase	(Norway) Bodø/Glimt	—N/a	1–2	28th	
2024–25	League phase	(Spain) Athletic Bilbao	4–1	—N/a	28th	
2024–25	League phase	(Netherlands) Twente	—N/a	0–1	28th	
2025–26	Second qualifying round	(Ukraine) Shakhtar Donetsk	2–4	0–2	2–6	
2026–27	Second qualifying round	(Denmark) Midtjylland	1–0	2–0	3–0	
2026–27	Third qualifying round	(Czech Republic) Hradec Králové	1–0	1–0	2–0	
2026–27	Play-off round	(Lithuania) Kauno Žalgiris	3–0	0–1	3–1	
2026–27	League phase	(France) Marseille	4–1	—N/a		
2026–27	League phase	(Germany) TSG Hoffenheim	—N/a	3–2		
2026–27	League phase	(England) Crystal Palace	2–2	—N/a		
2026–27	League phase	(Scotland) Celtic	—N/a			
2026–27	League phase	(Israel) Hapoel Be'er Sheva		—N/a		
2026–27	League phase	(Germany) Bayer Leverkusen	—N/a			
2026–27	League phase	(Belgium) Union Saint-Gilloise		—N/a		
2026–27	League phase	(Cyprus) Omonia	—N/a			

== UEFA Conference League ==
Season	Round	Opposing team	Home	Away	Agg.	Reference
2023–24	Second qualifying round	(Albania) Tirana	3–1	2–0	5–1	
2023–24	Third qualifying round	(Azerbaijan) Neftçi	2–1	3–1	5–2	
2023–24	Play-off round	(Ukraine) Dynamo Kyiv	1–0	3–2	4–2	
2023–24	Group D	(Belgium) Club Brugge	0–5	1–1	3rd	
2023–24	Group D	(Switzerland) Lugano	2–3	2–0	3rd	
2023–24	Group D	(Norway) Bodø/Glimt	1–2	1–3	3rd	
2025–26	Third qualifying round	(Republic of Ireland) St Patrick's Athletic	3–2	4–1	7–3	
2025–26	Play-off round	(Switzerland) Lausanne-Sport	0–1	1–1	1–2	

== Statistics by club/country ==
Accurate as of 22 October 2026

Country	Club	Pld	W	D	L	GF	GA	GD
Albania	Dinamo Tirana	2	2	0	0	3	0	+3
Albania	Skënderbeu	2	2	0	0	3	0	+3
Albania	Tirana	2	2	0	0	5	1	+4
Subtotal		6	6	0	0	11	1	+10
Austria	LASK	2	1	0	1	2	2	0
Austria	Rapid Wien	8	3	1	4	7	14	–7
Subtotal		10	4	1	5	9	16	–7
Azerbaijan	Neftçi	2	2	0	0	5	2	+3
Subtotal		2	2	0	0	5	2	+3
Belarus	Dinamo Minsk	2	1	0	1	3	2	+1
Subtotal		2	1	0	1	3	2	+1
Belgium	Club Brugge	5	1	1	3	5	12	–7
Belgium	Genk	2	0	1	1	3	5	–2
Belgium	RWD Molenbeek	2	1	1	0	3	0	+3
Belgium	Standard Liège	1	0	1	0	1	1	0
Subtotal		10	2	4	4	12	18	–6
(Bosnia and Herzegovina) Bosnia Herzegovina	Sarajevo	2	1	1	0	7	2	+5
(Bosnia and Herzegovina) Bosnia Herzegovina	Široki Brijeg	2	2	0	0	6	1	+5
Subtotal		4	3	1	0	13	3	+10
Bulgaria	CSKA Sofia	4	3	1	0	7	3	+4
Bulgaria	Levski Sofia	2	1	1	0	2	1	+1
Subtotal		6	4	2	0	9	4	+5
Croatia	Dinamo Zagreb	2	1	0	1	1	2	–1
Subtotal		2	1	0	1	1	2	–1
Czech Republic	Hradec Králové	2	2	0	0	2	0	+2
Czech Republic	Slavia Prague	2	1	0	1	4	3	+1
Czech Republic	Sparta Prague	2	1	0	1	2	2	0
Czech Republic	Viktoria Plzeň	2	1	1	0	4	1	+3
Subtotal		8	5	1	2	12	6	+6
Denmark	Midtjylland	2	2	0	0	3	0	+3
Subtotal		2	2	0	0	3	0	+3
England	Arsenal	2	0	1	1	0	1	–1
England	Aston Villa	2	0	1	1	1	3	–2
England	Bolton Wanderers	1	0	1	0	1	1	0
England	Chelsea	2	1	0	1	2	2	0
England	Crystal Palace	1	0	1	0	2	2	0
England	Leeds United	2	0	1	1	0	6	–6
England	Liverpool	4	2	0	2	3	10	–7
England	Manchester United	2	1	0	1	1	1	0
England	Stoke City	2	1	0	1	4	3	+1
England	Tottenham Hotspur	3	1	1	1	2	3	–1
England	Wolverhampton Wanderers	2	0	0	2	0	5	–5
Subtotal		23	6	6	11	16	37	–21
Faroe Islands	B36 Tórshavn	2	2	0	0	8	0	+8
Faroe Islands	Víkingur Gøta	2	2	0	0	7	0	+7
Subtotal		4	4	0	0	15	0	+15
Finland	HJK	4	3	1	0	9	1	+8
Subtotal		4	3	1	0	9	1	+8
France	Auxerre	2	0	1	1	2	4	–2
France	Lyon	3	2	0	1	4	3	+1
France	Marseille	3	2	0	1	6	4	+2
France	Monaco	2	1	1	0	3	2	+1
France	Paris Saint-Germain	2	1	0	1	4	3	+1
Subtotal		12	6	2	4	19	16	+3
Germany	Bayer Leverkusen	1	0	0	1	1	2	–1
Germany	Bayern Munich	4	0	0	4	1	12	–11
Germany	Borussia Dortmund	4	0	0	4	2	10	–8
Germany	Eintracht Frankfurt	1	0	0	1	1	3	–2
Germany	RB Leipzig	2	2	0	0	4	1	+3
Germany	TSG Hoffenheim	1	1	0	0	3	2	+1
Germany	VfL Wolfsburg	2	0	1	1	0	3	–3
Subtotal		15	3	1	11	12	33	–21
Greece	Asteras Tripolis	2	0	2	0	3	3	0
Greece	Olympiacos	2	1	1	0	5	2	+3
Greece	PAOK	1	0	0	1	1	3	−2
Subtotal		5	1	3	1	9	8	+1
Hungary	Diósgyőri	2	1	0	1	2	5	–3
Subtotal		2	1	0	1	2	5	–3
(Republic of Ireland) Ireland	St Patrick's Athletic	2	2	0	0	7	3	+4
Subtotal		2	2	0	0	7	3	+4
Israel	Hapoel Be'er Sheva	2	2	0	0	5	2	+3
Israel	Hapoel Haifa	2	0	2	0	1	1	0
Israel	Maccabi Tel Aviv	3	2	0	1	9	6	+3
Subtotal		7	4	2	1	15	9	+6
Italy	Fiorentina	2	0	0	2	0	6	–6
Italy	Inter Milan	2	0	1	1	1	3	–2
Italy	Lazio	4	0	1	3	2	6	–4
Italy	Milan	2	0	0	2	1	6	–5
Italy	Napoli	2	1	1	0	4	3	+1
Italy	Parma	1	0	0	1	2	3	–1
Subtotal		13	1	3	9	10	27	–17
Liechtenstein	Vaduz	2	2	0	0	6	1	+5
Subtotal		2	2	0	0	6	1	+5
Lithuania	Kauno Žalgiris	2	1	0	1	3	1	+2
Subtotal		2	1	0	1	3	1	+2
Moldova	Sheriff Tiraspol	2	2	0	0	4	0	+4
Subtotal		2	2	0	0	4	0	+4
Netherlands	Ajax	7	0	0	7	3	18	–15
Netherlands	Feyenoord	2	2	0	0	5	2	+3
Netherlands	PSV Eindhoven	2	0	1	1	2	3	–1
Netherlands	Twente	1	0	0	1	0	1	–1
Subtotal		12	2	1	9	10	24	–14
Norway	Bodø/Glimt	5	1	1	3	5	8	–3
Norway	Rosenborg	2	1	0	1	3	4	–1
Norway	Sarpsborg 08	2	2	0	0	6	3	+3
Norway	Tromsø	2	1	0	1	3	2	+1
Norway	Vålerenga	2	0	1	1	3	4	–1
Subtotal		13	5	2	6	20	21	–1
Poland	Legia Warsaw	2	1	1	0	3	2	+1
Subtotal		2	1	1	0	3	2	+1
Portugal	Benfica	2	0	2	0	4	4	0
Portugal	Braga	4	1	0	3	4	6	–2
Portugal	Porto	6	1	2	3	6	9	–3
Portugal	Rio Ave	1	0	1	0	1	1	0
Portugal	Sporting CP	4	0	1	3	3	12	–9
Portugal	Vitória	1	1	0	0	3	1	+2
Subtotal		18	3	6	9	21	33	–12
Romania	Brașov	2	1	0	1	2	3	–1
Romania	Dinamo București	1	0	0	1	1	2	–1
Romania	FCSB	1	0	0	1	1	2	–1
Subtotal		4	1	0	3	4	7	–3
Russia	Alania Vladikavkaz	2	1	0	1	3	2	+1
Russia	CSKA Moscow	2	0	0	2	2	4	–2
Russia	Lokomotiv Moscow	4	2	2	0	8	3	+5
Russia	Zenit Saint Petersburg	1	0	1	0	1	1	0
Subtotal		9	3	3	3	14	10	+4
Serbia	Partizan	4	3	1	0	10	2	+8
Subtotal		4	3	1	0	10	2	+8
Slovakia	Košice	2	1	0	1	3	2	+1
Slovakia	Slovan Bratislava	2	1	0	1	4	5	–1
Slovakia	Spartak Trnava	2	1	0	1	4	2	+2
Subtotal		6	3	0	3	11	9	+2
Slovenia	Maribor	2	1	1	0	3	1	+2
Subtotal		2	1	1	0	3	1	+2
Spain	Alavés	2	1	1	0	2	1	+1
Spain	Athletic Bilbao	4	2	0	2	8	7	+1
Spain	Atlético Madrid	2	0	0	2	1	6	–5
Spain	Barcelona	2	1	0	1	3	5	–2
Spain	Real Madrid	2	0	1	1	1	3	–2
Spain	Sevilla	1	0	0	1	0	3	–3
Spain	Valencia	4	0	1	3	5	10	–5
Subtotal		17	4	3	10	20	35	–15
Sweden	IFK Göteborg	4	2	0	2	4	5	–1
Sweden	Malmö FF	7	2	1	4	10	11	–1
Subtotal		11	4	1	6	14	16	–2
Switzerland	Lausanne-Sport	2	0	1	1	1	2	-1
Switzerland	Lugano	4	2	1	1	12	7	+5
Switzerland	Zürich	2	1	1	0	3	1	+2
Subtotal		8	3	3	2	16	10	+6
Ukraine	Dynamo Kyiv	12	4	2	6	10	26	–16
Ukraine	Metalist Kharkiv	2	1	0	1	2	4	–2
Ukraine	Shakhtar Donetsk	2	0	0	2	2	6	–4
Subtotal		16	5	2	9	14	36	–22
Total		267	104	51	112	365	401	–36

== Player and coach statistics ==
Accurate as of 1 June 2026

Top-scoring players in European competitions

Player	Country	Goals	Apps	Ratio
Oktay Derelioğlu	Turkey	14	29	0.48
Cenk Tosun	Turkey	13	40	0.33
Vincent Aboubakar	Cameroon	13	19	0.68
Bobô	Brazil	12	37	0.32
Ricardo Quaresma	Portugal	12	50	0.24
Daniel Pancu	Romania	9	27	0.33
Demba Ba	Senegal	8	12	0.67
Mehmet Özdilek	Turkey	7	46	0.15
Ryan Babel	Netherlands	7	20	0.35
Talisca	Brazil	7	17	0.41

Players with most European appearances

Player	Country	Apps
Necip Uysal	Turkey	75
İbrahim Üzülmez	Turkey	63
Oğuzhan Özyakup	Turkey	52
Ricardo Quaresma	Portugal	50
Mehmet Özdilek	Turkey	46
Tayfur Havutçu	Turkey	45
İbrahim Toraman	Turkey	43
Atiba Hutchinson	Canada	42
Sergen Yalçın	Turkey	42
Cenk Tosun	Turkey	40

Coaches with most European appearances

Coach	Country	Apps
Şenol Güneş	Turkey	44
Mircea Lucescu	Romania	18
Gordon Milne	England	16
Slaven Bilić	Croatia	16
Bernd Schuster	Germany	14
Ertuğrul Sağlam	Turkey	14
Carlos Carvalhal	Portugal	12
John Toshack	Wales	12
Jean Tigana	France	10
Nevio Scala	Italy	9

== UEFA club ranking ==
=== Current ranking ===
As of 21 June 2023

Rank	Team	Points
108	(Cyprus) APOEL	14.500
109	(Czech Republic) Sparta Prague	14.000
109	(Kazakhstan) Astana	14.000
109	(Turkey) Beşiktaş	14.000
112	(Austria) Wolfsberger AC	13.500

=== Ranking history ===
Season	Rank	Points	Ref.
1960	53 ▲	0.500	
1961	60 ▼	0.500	
1962	75 ▼	0.500	
1963	95 ▼	0.500	
1975	149 ▲	1.000	
1976	151 ▼	1.000	
1977	152 ▼	1.000	
1978	92 ▲	2.000	
1979	93 ▼	2.000	
1980	155 ▼	1.000	
1981	153 ▲	1.000	
1982	149 ▲	1.000	
1983	204 ▼	0.500	
1984	199 ▲	0.500	
1985	149 ▲	1.000	
1986	149	1.000	
1987	84 ▲	2.250	
1988	86 ▼	2.250	
1989	57 ▲	3.250	
1990	73 ▼	2.750	
1991	62 ▲	3.250	
1992	69 ▼	2.500	
1993	58 ▲	3.000	
1994	76 ▼	2.500	
1995	50 ▲	3.500	
1996	55 ▼	3.000	
1997	43 ▲	3.666	
1998	44 ▼	3.499	
1999	76 ▼	29.175	
2000	84 ▼	26.925	
2001	73 ▲	33.987	
2002	97 ▼	26.362	
2003	76 ▲	33.495	
2004	68 ▲	32.656	
2005	55 ▲	37.872	
2006	59 ▼	38.634	
2007	50 ▲	43.791	
2008	60 ▼	40.469	
2009	64 ▼	32.445	
2010	62 ▲	33.890	
2011	57 ▲	37.010	
2012	52 ▲	41.810	
2013	66 ▼	34.900	
2014	66	32.840	
2015	58 ▲	36.520	
2016	62 ▼	34.920	
2017	43 ▲	45.840	
2018	26 ▲	57.000	
2019	25 ▲	62.000	
2020	27 ▼	54.000	
2021	29 ▼	49.000	
2022	49 ▼	33.000	
2023	109 ▼	14.000	

== Non-UEFA competitions ==
=== Statistics ===
As of 30 May 1973

Competition	Pld	W	D	L	GF	GA	GD
International Soccer League	7	1	2	4	8	19	–11
Balkans Cup	16	2	5	9	9	33	–24
Total	23	3	7	13	17	52	–35

Pld = Matches played; W = Matches won; D = Matches drawn; L = Matches lost; GF = Goals for; GA = Goals against; GD = Goal Difference.

=== International Soccer League ===
International Soccer League
Season	Round	Opponent	Score	Agg.
1961	Group Stage (Section I)	(England) Everton	0–4	8th
1961	Group Stage (Section I)	(Brazil) Bangu	1–6	8th
1961	Group Stage (Section I)	(United States) New York Americans	0–1	8th
1961	Group Stage (Section I)	(West Germany) Karlsruher SC	3–1	8th
1961	Group Stage (Section I)	(Scotland) Kilmarnock	1–1	8th
1961	Group Stage (Section I)	(Canada) Montreal Concordia	1–1	8th
1961	Group Stage (Section I)	(Romania) Dinamo București	2–5	8th

=== Balkans Cup ===
Balkans Cup
Season	Round	Opponent	Home	Away	Agg.
1963–64	Group Stage (Group A)	(Romania) Rapid București	0–0	0–3	4th
1963–64	Group Stage (Group A)	(Bulgaria) Levski Sofia	1–1	0–4	4th
1963–64	Group Stage (Group A)	(Albania) Dinamo Tirana	1–0	0–2	4th
1964–66	Group Stage (Group B)	(Romania) Rapid București	0–3	0–3	4th
1964–66	Group Stage (Group B)	(Bulgaria) Cherno More Varna	1–1	0–2	4th
1964–66	Group Stage (Group B)	(Albania) 17 Nëntori Tirana	1–1	0–2	4th
1973	Group Stage (Group B)	(Bulgaria) Lokomotiv Sofia	1–6	0–0	2nd
1973	Group Stage (Group B)	(Greece) Aris	2–1	2–4	2nd

=== By country ===
As of 30 May 1973

Country	Club	P	W	D	L	GF	GA	GD
Albania	FC Dinamo City	2	1	0	1	1	2	–1
Albania	KF Tirana	2	0	1	1	1	3	–2
Subtotal		4	1	1	2	2	5	–3
Brazil	Bangu AC	1	0	0	1	1	6	–5
Bulgaria	FC Lokomotiv 1929 Sofia	2	0	1	1	1	6	–5
Bulgaria	PFC Cherno More Varna	2	0	1	1	1	3	–2
Bulgaria	PFC Levski Sofia	2	0	1	1	1	5	–4
Subtotal		6	0	3	3	3	14	–11
Canada	Montreal Concordia	1	0	1	0	1	1	0
England	Everton FC	1	0	0	1	0	4	–4
Germany	Karlsruher SC	1	1	0	0	3	1	+2
Greece	Aris Thessaloniki FC	2	1	0	1	4	5	–1
Romania	FC Dinamo București	1	0	0	1	2	5	–3
Romania	FC Rapid București	4	0	1	3	0	9	–9
Subtotal		5	0	1	4	2	14	–12
Scotland	Kilmarnock FC	1	0	1	0	1	1	0
United States	New York Americans	1	0	0	1	0	1	–1
Total		23	3	7	13	17	52	-35

== Notes ==
- A. ^{a} Olympiacos withdrew due to international political issues, refusing to play in Istanbul following the long-standing tension between Turkey and Greece.
- B. ^{b} APOEL withdrew for political reasons.
- C. ^{c} On 30 August 2013, the Court of Arbitration for Sport upheld UEFA's ban on Beşiktaş. As a result, UEFA decided to replace Beşiktaş in the Europa League group stage with Tromsø, who were eliminated by Beşiktaş in the play-off round.
