= Vince McNeice =

English footballer and manager (1938–2022)

Personal information
- Full name: Vincent McNeice
- Date of birth: 25 October 1938
- Place of birth: Cricklewood, England
- Date of death: 29 August 2022 (aged 83)
- Place of death: Copenhagen, Denmark
- Position: Centre half

Youth career
- Brentford
- –1957: Watford

Senior career*
Years	Team	Apps	(Gls)
1957–1964	Watford	231	(0)
1961	→ Montreal Concordia	1	(0)
1964–1965	Bexley United		
1965–1966	Hamilton Primos		
1966–1969	Hillingdon Borough		

Managerial career
- 1965: Hamilton Primos
- 1971: B 1903
- 1976–1980: AaB
- 1992: AGF (reserve team)
- * Club domestic league appearances and goals

Vincent McNeice (25 October 1938 – 29 August 2022) was an English professional footballer and manager who made over 230 appearances in the Football League for Watford as a centre half. In 1965, he played in the Eastern Canada Professional Soccer League for Hamilton Primos. During his debut season with Hamilton Primos, McNeice was selected to the league's all-star team, which faced Nottingham Forest. He also briefly served as a player-coach for Hamilton Primos before Bill Paterson succeeded him.

McNeice later became a manager and a coach in Denmark, managing B 1903, AaB and one other club, in addition to coaching the reserve team at AGF.

== Career statistics ==
Appearances and goals by club, season and competition
Club	Season	League			National cup		League cup		Other		Total	
Club	Season	Division	Apps	Goals	Apps	Goals	Apps	Goals	Apps	Goals	Apps	Goals
Watford	1957–58	Third Division South	25	0	0	0	—		1 (Note: Appearances in Southern Professional Floodlit Cup)	0	26	0
Watford	1958–59	Fourth Division	33	0	3	0	—		2	0	38	0
Watford	1959–60	Fourth Division	38	0	7	1	—		1	0	46	1
Watford	1960–61	Third Division	40	0	5	0	1	0	—		46	0
Watford	1961–62	Third Division	41	0	3	0	3	0	—		47	0
Watford	1962–63	Third Division	43	0	4	0	1	0	—		48	0
Watford	1963–64	Third Division	11	0	0	0	1	0	—		12	0
Watford	Total		231	0	22	1	6	0	4	0	263	1
Montreal Concordia (loan)	1961	International Soccer League	1	0	—		—		—		1	0
Career total			232	0	22	1	6	0	4	0	264	1

== Honours ==
Watford

- Football League Fourth Division fourth-place promotion: 1959–60
