= Kolven Island =

Island in Antarctica

- Location within Antarctica

Geography
- Location: Antarctica
- Coordinates: 67°33′S 61°29′E

Administration
- Administered under the Antarctic Treaty System

Demographics
- Population: Uninhabited

Kolven Island is a small island lying 1 kilometre (0.5 nmi) east of Stedet Island and just northeast of Falla Bluff, in Utstikkar Bay, Mac. Robertson Land, Antarctica. It was mapped by Norwegian cartographers from air photos taken by the Lars Christensen Expedition, 1936–37, and named Kolven (the club).

== See also ==
- List of Antarctic and sub-Antarctic islands
