= 1963–64 in English football =

Football in England
- Season: 1963–64

Men's football
- First Division: Liverpool
- Second Division: Leeds United
- Third Division: Coventry City
- Fourth Division: Gillingham
- FA Cup: West Ham United
- League Cup: Leicester City
- Charity Shield: Everton

The 1963–64 season was the 84th season of competitive football in England, from August 1963 to May 1964.

== Diary of the season ==
- 17 August 1963 – Reigning league champions Everton won the Charity Shield after a 4–0 win over FA Cup winners Manchester United.
- 14 September 1963 – George Best, a 17-year-old Northern Irish winger, makes his debut for Manchester United in their 1–0 First Division win over West Bromwich Albion.
- 23 October 1963 – an England versus Rest of the World XI match is staged to mark the centenary of The Football Association. Against a star-studded opposition team containing Alfredo Di Stéfano, Ferenc Puskás, Denis Law, Lev Yashin and Eusébio, England won 2–1 with goals from Terry Paine and Jimmy Greaves, while Denis Law scored for the Rest of the World.
- 26 December 1963 – 66 goals were scored in the 10 First Division matches. Fulham were the biggest winners, defeating Ipswich Town 10–1.
- 5 April 1964 – Tottenham captain Danny Blanchflower, 38, announced his retirement from playing.
- 8 April 1964 – Blackburn Rovers are announced as England's participant in the 1964 edition of the International Soccer League.
- 11 April 1964 – Scotland beat England 1–0 in the British Home Championship to leave the two level on four points in the final table. Northern Ireland subsequently defeated Wales to finish level on points with the other two, thus ensuring that the title was shared between three nations.
- 12 April 1964 – The Sunday People publishes allegations that lead to a betting scandal. It reported that Mansfield Town player Jimmy Gauld had, over several years, systematically engaged in match fixing, and that many other players were involved.
- 18 April 1964 – Liverpool beat Arsenal 5–0 at Anfield to secure the title. In their penultimate game of the season, Ipswich Town lose 3–1 to Blackburn Rovers, confirming their relegation two years after winning the League championship.
- 22 April 1964 – Leicester City win the League Cup – their first major trophy – with a 4–3 aggregate victory over Stoke City.
- 25 April 1964 – On the final day of the Second Division season, Leeds United win 2–0 at Charlton Athletic and Sunderland fail to beat Grimsby Town, meaning Leeds were crowned champions.
- 2 May 1964 – West Ham United beat Preston North End 3–2 at Wembley to win the FA Cup for the first time. Trailing 2–1 at half time, West Ham scored two second half goals to deny Preston.

== Notable debutants ==
- 14 September 1963 – George Best, 17-year-old Northern Irish winger, makes his debut for Manchester United against West Bromwich Albion in the First Division.

== Notable retirements ==
- 5 April 1964 – Danny Blanchflower, 38-year-old Tottenham Hotspur captain.

== Honours ==
Competition	Winner	Runner-up
First Division	Liverpool (6)	Manchester United
Second Division	Leeds United	Sunderland
Third Division	Coventry City	Crystal Palace
Fourth Division	Gillingham	Carlisle United
FA Cup	West Ham United (1)	Preston North End
League Cup	Leicester City (1)	Stoke City
Charity Shield	Everton	Manchester United
Home Championship	England, Scotland, Northern Ireland	

Notes = Number in parentheses is the times that club has won that honour. * indicates new record for competition

== Awards ==
Football Writers' Association

- Footballer of the Year – Bobby Moore (West Ham United)

Top goalscorer

- Jimmy Greaves (Tottenham Hotspur), 35

== Football League ==
=== First Division ===
Liverpool clinched the First Division title just two seasons after winning promotion, finishing four points ahead of runners-up Manchester United while defending champions Everton finished third.

Tottenham Hotspur managed to finish fourth despite not winning any silverware and being without many key players for much of the season due to injury, while captain Danny Blanchflower announced his retirement from playing just before the season's end. Tragedy then struck the club after the season was over, when forward John White was struck by lightning and killed on a North London golf course.

Chelsea enjoyed a strong return to the First Division by finishing fifth, while Leicester City finally got their hands on a major trophy by winning the League Cup.

With Alf Ramsey having now left Ipswich Town to manage the England team, Ipswich Town struggled badly under his successor Jackie Milburn, and went down in bottom place having conceded 121 goals just two seasons after being league champions. Bolton Wanderers, who had gradually faded away since the retirement of centre-forward Nat Lofthouse in 1960, also went down.

Fulham's 10-1 win over Ipswich Town on Boxing Day remains the most recent time a team has score 10 or more goals in a single game in top-flight English football.

Pos	Team	Pld	W	D	L	GF	GA	GAv	Pts	Qualification or relegation
1	Liverpool (C)	42	26	5	11	92	45	2.044	57	Qualification for the European Cup preliminary round
2	Manchester United	42	23	7	12	90	62	1.452	53	Qualification for the Inter-Cities Fairs Cup first round
3	Everton	42	21	10	11	84	64	1.313	52	Qualification for the Inter-Cities Fairs Cup first round
4	Tottenham Hotspur	42	22	7	13	97	81	1.198	51	
5	Chelsea	42	20	10	12	72	56	1.286	50	
6	Sheffield Wednesday	42	19	11	12	84	67	1.254	49	
7	Blackburn Rovers	42	18	10	14	89	65	1.369	46	
8	Arsenal	42	17	11	14	90	82	1.098	45	
9	Burnley	42	17	10	15	71	64	1.109	44	
10	West Bromwich Albion	42	16	11	15	70	61	1.148	43	
11	Leicester City	42	16	11	15	61	58	1.052	43	
12	Sheffield United	42	16	11	15	61	64	0.953	43	
13	Nottingham Forest	42	16	9	17	64	68	0.941	41	
14	West Ham United	42	14	12	16	69	74	0.932	40	Qualification for the European Cup Winners' Cup first round
15	Fulham	42	13	13	16	58	65	0.892	39	
16	Wolverhampton Wanderers	42	12	15	15	70	80	0.875	39	
17	Stoke City	42	14	10	18	77	78	0.987	38	
18	Blackpool	42	13	9	20	52	73	0.712	35	
19	Aston Villa	42	11	12	19	62	71	0.873	34	
20	Birmingham City	42	11	7	24	54	92	0.587	29	
21	Bolton Wanderers (R)	42	10	8	24	48	80	0.600	28	Relegation to the Second Division
22	Ipswich Town (R)	42	9	7	26	56	121	0.463	25	Relegation to the Second Division

Source: World Football
Rules for classification: 1) Points; 2) Goal average; 3) Goals scored
(C) Champions; (R) Relegated

=== Second Division ===
Leeds United returned to the First Division after seven years away by clinching the Second Division title under ambitious manager Don Revie, while Sunderland's six-year exile from the First Division was ended by promotion as Second Division runners-up.

Grimsby Town and Scunthorpe United slipped into the Third Division.

Pos	Team	Pld	W	D	L	GF	GA	GAv	Pts	Qualification or relegation
1	Leeds United (C, P)	42	24	15	3	71	34	2.088	63	Promotion to the First Division
2	Sunderland (P)	42	25	11	6	81	37	2.189	61	Promotion to the First Division
3	Preston North End	42	23	10	9	79	54	1.463	56	
4	Charlton Athletic	42	19	10	13	76	70	1.086	48	
5	Southampton	42	19	9	14	100	73	1.370	47	
6	Manchester City	42	18	10	14	84	66	1.273	46	
7	Rotherham United	42	19	7	16	90	78	1.154	45	
8	Newcastle United	42	20	5	17	74	69	1.072	45	
9	Portsmouth	42	16	11	15	79	70	1.129	43	
10	Middlesbrough	42	15	11	16	67	52	1.288	41	
11	Northampton Town	42	16	9	17	58	60	0.967	41	
12	Huddersfield Town	42	15	10	17	57	64	0.891	40	
13	Derby County	42	14	11	17	56	67	0.836	39	
14	Swindon Town	42	14	10	18	57	69	0.826	38	
15	Cardiff City	42	14	10	18	56	81	0.691	38	Qualification for the European Cup Winners' Cup first round
16	Leyton Orient	42	13	10	19	54	72	0.750	36	
17	Norwich City	42	11	13	18	64	80	0.800	35	
18	Bury	42	13	9	20	57	73	0.781	35	
19	Swansea Town	42	12	9	21	63	74	0.851	33	
20	Plymouth Argyle	42	8	16	18	45	67	0.672	32	
21	Grimsby Town (R)	42	9	14	19	47	75	0.627	32	Relegation to the Third Division
22	Scunthorpe United (R)	42	10	10	22	52	82	0.634	30	Relegation to the Third Division

Rules for classification: 1) Points; 2) Goal average; 3) Goals scored
(C) Champions; (P) Promoted; (R) Relegated

=== Third Division ===
Coventry City made the breakthrough into the Second Division as champions of the Third Division, finishing level on points at the top of the league with Crystal Palace.

Notts County, Wrexham, Crewe Alexandra and Millwall were all relegated to the Fourth Division.

Pos	Team	Pld	W	D	L	GF	GA	GAv	Pts	Promotion or relegation
1	Coventry City (C, P)	46	22	16	8	98	61	1.607	60	Promotion to the Second Division
2	Crystal Palace (P)	46	23	14	9	73	51	1.431	60	Promotion to the Second Division
3	Watford	46	23	12	11	79	59	1.339	58	
4	Bournemouth & Boscombe Athletic	46	24	8	14	79	58	1.362	56	
5	Bristol City	46	20	15	11	84	64	1.313	55	
6	Reading	46	21	10	15	79	62	1.274	52	
7	Mansfield Town	46	20	11	15	76	62	1.226	51	
8	Hull City	46	16	17	13	73	68	1.074	49	
9	Oldham Athletic	46	20	8	18	73	70	1.043	48	
10	Peterborough United	46	18	11	17	75	70	1.071	47	
11	Shrewsbury Town	46	18	11	17	73	80	0.913	47	
12	Bristol Rovers	46	19	8	19	91	79	1.152	46	
13	Port Vale	46	16	14	16	53	49	1.082	46	
14	Southend United	46	15	15	16	77	78	0.987	45	
15	Queens Park Rangers	46	18	9	19	76	78	0.974	45	
16	Brentford	46	15	14	17	87	80	1.088	44	
17	Colchester United	46	12	19	15	70	68	1.029	43	
18	Luton Town	46	16	10	20	64	80	0.800	42	
19	Walsall	46	13	14	19	59	76	0.776	40	
20	Barnsley	46	12	15	19	68	94	0.723	39	
21	Millwall (R)	46	14	10	22	53	67	0.791	38	Relegation to the Fourth Division
22	Crewe Alexandra (R)	46	11	12	23	50	77	0.649	34	Relegation to the Fourth Division
23	Wrexham (R)	46	13	6	27	75	107	0.701	32	Relegation to the Fourth Division
24	Notts County (R)	46	9	9	28	45	92	0.489	27	Relegation to the Fourth Division

(C) Champions; (P) Promoted; (R) Relegated

=== Fourth Division ===
Gillingham finished champions of the Fourth Division, ahead of runners-up Carlisle United on goal average. They enjoyed a narrow lead over third placed Workington and fourth placed Exeter City. Bradford City bounced back from having to apply for re-election to just missing out on promotion in the space of a season.

Pos	Team	Pld	W	D	L	GF	GA	GAv	Pts	Promotion or relegation
1	Gillingham (C, P)	46	23	14	9	59	30	1.967	60	Promotion to the Third Division
2	Carlisle United (P)	46	25	10	11	113	58	1.948	60	Promotion to the Third Division
3	Workington (P)	46	24	11	11	76	52	1.462	59	Promotion to the Third Division
4	Exeter City (P)	46	20	18	8	62	37	1.676	58	Promotion to the Third Division
5	Bradford City	46	25	6	15	76	62	1.226	56	
6	Torquay United	46	20	11	15	80	54	1.481	51	
7	Tranmere Rovers	46	20	11	15	85	73	1.164	51	
8	Brighton & Hove Albion	46	19	12	15	71	52	1.365	50	
9	Aldershot	46	19	10	17	83	78	1.064	48	
10	Halifax Town	46	17	14	15	77	77	1.000	48	
11	Lincoln City	46	19	9	18	67	75	0.893	47	
12	Chester	46	19	8	19	65	60	1.083	46	
13	Bradford (Park Avenue)	46	18	9	19	75	81	0.926	45	
14	Doncaster Rovers	46	15	12	19	70	75	0.933	42	
15	Newport County	46	17	8	21	64	73	0.877	42	
16	Chesterfield	46	15	12	19	57	71	0.803	42	
17	Stockport County	46	15	12	19	50	68	0.735	42	
18	Oxford United	46	14	13	19	59	63	0.937	41	
19	Darlington	46	14	12	20	66	93	0.710	40	
20	Rochdale	46	12	15	19	56	59	0.949	39	
21	Southport	46	15	9	22	63	88	0.716	39	Re-elected
22	York City	46	14	7	25	52	66	0.788	35	Re-elected
23	Hartlepools United	46	12	9	25	54	93	0.581	33	Re-elected
24	Barrow	46	6	18	22	51	93	0.548	30	Re-elected

Source: rsssf.com
(C) Champions; (P) Promoted

=== Top goalscorers ===
First Division

- Jimmy Greaves (Tottenham Hotspur) – 35 goals

Second Division

- Ron Saunders (Portsmouth) – 33 goals

Third Division

- Alfie Biggs (Bristol Rovers) – 30 goals

Fourth Division

- Hughie McIlmoyle (Carlisle United) – 39 goals

== European club competitions ==
=== European Champions' Cup ===
- Everton – Preliminary round

=== UEFA Cup Winners' Cup ===
- Manchester United – Quarter-finals
- Tottenham Hotspur – Second round

=== Inter-Cities Fairs Cup ===
- Arsenal – Second round
- Sheffield Wednesday – Second round

== National team ==
The England national football team had an eventful season with a shared victory in the 1964 British Home Championship, another success against a Rest of the World XI in one of the most famous matches ever played at Wembley and a tour of the Americas upon the season's conclusion which culminated in a dire performance in Brazil during the 1964 Taça de Nações.

=== American tour ===
27 May 1964

United States	0–10	England
		Roger Hunt 4, Fred Pickering 3, Terry Paine 2, Bobby Charlton

Downing Stadium, New York

Taça das Nações

30 May 1964

Brazil	5–1	England
Rinaldo 2, Pelé, Julinho, Roberto Dias		Jimmy Greaves

Maracanã Stadium, Rio de Janeiro

4 June 1964

Portugal	1–1	England
Fernando Peres		Roger Hunt

Pacaembu Stadium, São Paulo

6 June 1964

Argentina	1–0	England
Alfredo Rojas

Maracanã Stadium, Rio de Janeiro

=== Other matches ===
Date	Opposition	Venue	Competition	Result	Score
12 October 1963	Wales	Ninian Park, Cardiff	British Championship	Won	4–0
23 October 1963	Rest of the World XI	Wembley	Friendly	Won	2–1
20 November 1963	Northern Ireland	Wembley	British Championship	Won	8–3
11 April 1964	Scotland	Hampden Park, Glasgow	British Championship	Lost	0–1
6 May 1964	Uruguay	Wembley	Friendly	Won	2–1
17 May 1964	Portugal	Estádio Nacional, Lisbon	Friendly	Won	4–3
24 May 1964	Republic of Ireland	Dalymount Park, Dublin	Friendly	Won	3–1
