= Hogg Islands =

Archipelago

- Location within Antarctica

Geography
- Location: Antarctica
- Coordinates: 67°31′22″S 61°36′06″E

Administration
- Administered under the Antarctic Treaty System

Demographics
- Population: Uninhabited

The Hogg Islands are a group of small islands lying 1 kilometre (0.5 nmi) south of Kamelen Island in the northern part of the Stanton Group, Antarctica. **The group was mapped and named by the British, Australian and New Zealand Antarctic Research Expedition (BANZARE) under Douglas Mawson in February 1931.** These small islands were mapped from air photos taken by the Lars Christensen Expedition, 1936–37, and later by Australian National Antarctic Research Expeditions (ANARE). They were visited in 1969 by an ANARE dog-sledge party to the Taylor Glacier area. The islands were named by the Antarctic Names Committee of Australia for Dr. J. Hogg, medical officer at Mawson Station in 1969. The central island in the group affords the best camp site in the area.

== See also ==
- List of Antarctic and sub-Antarctic islands
