= Thelen LLP =

American bicoastal law firm

- Headquarters: San Francisco, California
- No. of offices: 8
- No. of attorneys: 400
- Major practice areas: Construction, Energy, Technology and Outsourcing
- Key people: Stephen V. O'Neal (Managing Partner)
- Date founded: 1924
- Company type: Limited liability partnership
- Dissolved: October 2008, due to partner departures and credit problems
- Website: www.thelen.com (ARCHIVE VIEW)

Thelen LLP, formerly known as Thelen Reid Brown Raysman & Steiner was a bicoastal American law firm formed by two mergers between California and New York–based law firms. The firm peaked at roughly 600 attorneys in 2006, and had 500 early in 2008, with attorneys with offices in eight cities in the United States, England and China. By the time of its decision to dissolve in late October 2008, it had shrunk to 400 attorneys through layoffs and attrition. Thelen was known for its preeminent construction practice which dates back to the 1930s and the local association between the law firm and contractors and developers of large hydroelectric dam projects. The construction practice offered regulatory, transactional and dispute resolution (litigation and arbitration) support. It was also known for its energy expertise, particularly in the electricity regulatory area, as well as for legal advice concerning technology and outsourcing.

== History ==
The firm that would become Thelen LLP was founded in 1924 as Thelen, Marrin, Johnson & Bridges (TMJB) in San Francisco, California. The firm counseled contractors and developers in a wide range of big ticket infrastructure projects, including the Hoover Dam, the Golden Gate Bridge, the San Francisco-Oakland Bridge and the second stage of Grand Coulee Dam. United States Supreme Court Justice Anthony M. Kennedy was a TMJB Associate Attorney from 1961 to 1963. In June 1998, Thelen Marrin merged with New York–based Reid & Priest, a firm with 160 attorneys founded in 1935 with a Washington, D.C., office, known for its industry experience in the electric utility sector. The combined firm reportedly sought to merge with an English law firm following the revelation that New York–based Rogers & Wells and London-based international firm Clifford Chance were in merger talks that eventually reached fruition. However, the firm did not ultimately engage in a transatlantic merger. Instead, it opted for domestic growth by acquiring the 10 lawyers of San Francisco–based boutique technology firm Britton Silberman & Cervantez in 2000. Three years later, the firm established a joint venture with UK firm Pinsent Masons focused on construction and project finance, called Masons Thelen Reid. The joint venture later launched a link-up with a law firm in Iraq in 2004 to assist firms involved in reconstruction. The joint venture was abandoned in 2007.

Thelen Reid & Priest LLP merged, effective on December 1, 2006, with Brown Raysman Millstein Felder & Steiner, LLP, to form Thelen Reid Brown Raysman & Steiner LLP. The transaction was the largest law firm merger in 2006, according to the Hildebrandt International consulting firm creating a bicoastal firm of over 600 attorneys with revenues of over $400 million.

According to the results of the National Law Journal's 2007 survey of the nation's largest law firms, Thelen Reid Brown Raysman & Steiner ranked 70. The firm later launched in London and Shanghai.

=== Dissolution ===
Thelen's merger with Brown Raysman created a culture clash on several levels. Thelen had historically been a conservative firm with "older and bigger" clients, while Brown Raysman was a more "entrepreneurial" firm that focused on technology and real estate clients. Thelen linked partner compensation to firm performance while Brown Raysman followed a "payout" model that provided income to capital partners regardless of how the firm performed. Several key partners began to leave the combined firm in early 2007.

By autumn 2008, the firm saw the departures of the three "name partners" from the Brown Raysman Steiner side. The firm shortened its name to Thelen LLP in August 2008. The firm lost almost 200 attorneys between merger and the October 2008 dissolution vote, including many important rainmakers and practice groups, who moved to such leading firms as DLA Piper, Orrick, Herrington & Sutcliffe, Proskauer Rose, and Loeb & Loeb. In late September 2008, twenty attorneys in the firm's China practice group in its Washington, D.C., and Shanghai offices left for Pillsbury Winthrop Shaw Pittman.

In July 2008, the firm internally announced its intention to seek another merger partner to boost its headcount and stem the tide of partner defections. After merger discussions with East Coast firm Nixon Peabody failed, the firm began looking to shed practice groups and offices under the threat of dissolution.

On October 28, 2008, the firm's partnership council recommended that the firm's partnership dissolve the firm. The firm's line of credit was cut off due to many partners departing the firm. In early November, between 60 and 90 attorneys from offices in San Francisco, Silicon Valley, New York, Los Angeles, Washington, D.C., and Shanghai were reportedly hired by Nixon Peabody. Other practices and groups of attorneys were hired by Howrey LLP, Reed Smith LLP Farella Braun + Martel, and Winston & Strawn, among other firms. The shut-down was completed by the end of 2008.

On September 17, 2009, Thelen filed for Chapter 7 bankruptcy in the Southern District of New York, after the firm's only secured creditor, Citibank, was also no longer willing to advance funds for the cost of collection and to wind down operations.

This subsequently ended the 85-year-old operation that peaked in the year 2006 with offices in a number of cities in the United States, England and China.

== Notable mandates ==
- Provided legal counsel to China Water and Drinks Inc., a Chinese beverage company in its $625 million acquisition by Heckmann Corp in 2008.
- Represented underwriters led by Morgan Stanley with Credit Suisse as co-manager in a $1.135 billion debt offering portion of a leveraged lease financing of the Bruce Mansfield Unit 1 coal-fired generating station by FirstEnergy Generation Corp., a subsidiary of FirstEnergy Corp. in 2007.
- Advised UniSource Energy Corporation in its $3 billion acquisition by a consortium consisting of Kohlberg Kravis Roberts, JPMorgan Partners and Wachovia Capital Partners in 2003.
- Represented the government of the Federal Republic of Nigeria in the 2001 $2.6 billion privatization of Nigerian Telecommunications plc.
