= Allison Bay =

- Isvika
- Interactive map of Allison Bay
- Location: Antarctica
- Coordinates: 67°30′S 61°17′E
- Type: Bay
- Etymology: Named after Dr. Robert Allison
- Part of: Mawson Coast
- Islands: Ufs Island

Allison Bay, also known as Isvika, is a small bay immediately west of the Utstikkar Glacier and about 4 kilometres (2.5 mi) east of the Lachal Bluffs and Ufs Island, on the Mawson Coast of Mac. Robertson Land in Antarctica. It was mapped by Norwegian cartographers from air photos taken by the Lars Christensen Expedition, 1936–37, and named Isvika (the ice bay); it was renamed by the Antarctic Names Committee of Australia for Dr. Robert Allison, medical officer at Mawson Station in 1955.
