= Utstikkar Glacier =

Glacier in Antarctica

- Location within Antarctica
- Location: Mac. Robertson Land
- Coordinates: 67°33′S 61°20′E
- Thickness: unknown
- Terminus: Utstikkar Glacier Tongue
- Status: unknown

In Antarctica, Utstikkar Glacier (67°33′S 61°18′E) is a broad glacier flowing north from the vicinity of Moyes Peak and terminating in Utstikkar Glacier Tongue between Utstikkar Bay to the east and Allison Bay to the west.

The glacier was mapped and named Utstikkarbreen (the out-jutting glacier) by Norwegian cartographers working from aerial photographs taken by the Lars Christensen Expedition in January–February 1937.

== See also ==
- List of glaciers in the Antarctic
- Glaciology
