= Lachal Bluffs =

The Lachal Bluffs (67°30′S 61°9′E) are a group of rocky headlands located just south of Ufs Island and east of Howard Bay, and about 4 kilometres (2.5 mi) west of Allison Bay, on the Mawson Coast of Mac. Robertson Land, Antarctica. They were mapped by Norwegian cartographers from air photos taken by the Lars Christensen Expedition, 1936–37, and named by the Antarctic Names Committee of Australia for R. Lachal, an assistant cook at Mawson Station, who acted as a geological field assistant, 1965.
