= Heckmann Island =

Island in Antarctica

- Location within Antarctica

Geography
- Location: Antarctica
- Coordinates: 67°20′S 61°3′E

Administration
- Administered under the Antarctic Treaty System

Demographics
- Population: Uninhabited

Heckmann Island is the largest island in the eastern part of the Thorfinn Islands, lying 13 kilometres (7 nmi) north of Byrd Head, Mac. Robertson Land, Antarctica. It was mapped by Norwegian cartographers from air photos taken by the Lars Christensen Expedition, 1936–37. It was remapped by the Australian National Antarctic Research Expeditions and named by the Antarctic Names Committee of Australia for B. Heckmann, chief officer on the Nella Dan in 1965.

== See also ==
- List of Antarctic and sub-Antarctic islands
