= Colbeck Archipelago =

Archipelago in Antarctica

Location of Colbeck Archipelago
Antarctica

Colbeck Archipelago (67°26′S 60°58′E) is an archipelago of numerous small rocky islands centered 1 mi northwest of Byrd Head, just east of Taylor Glacier, off Mawson Coast. Discovered in January 1930 and charted in February 1931 by the British Australian and New Zealand Antarctic Research Expedition (BANZARE) under Douglas Mawson. Named by Mawson for W.R. Colbeck, second officer of the expedition ship, Discovery. Norwegian whalers who explored this same area in January 1931 named the group 4 mi to the north the Thorfinn Islands. The name Colbeck has sometimes appeared on charts for this latter group.
