= Oldham Island =

Island in Antarctica

- Location within Antarctica

Geography
- Location: Antarctica
- Coordinates: 67°32′S 61°42′E

Administration
- Administered under the Antarctic Treaty System

Demographics
- Population: Uninhabited

Oldham Island is an island in the east part of the Stanton Group, off Mac. Robertson Land. Mapped by Norwegian cartographers from air photos taken by the Lars Christensen Expedition, 1936–37, and named Andoya (duck island). Renamed by Antarctic Names Committee of Australia (ANCA) for Hugh Oldham, biologist and magnetician at Mawson Station in 1955.

== See also ==
- List of Antarctic and sub-Antarctic islands
