= Pearce Peak =

Mountain in Antarctica

Pearce Peak (67°48′S 61°12′E) is a partially snow-covered ridge, 1,200 m, which appears as a peak when viewed from the north, standing 2 nautical miles (3.7 km) south of Moyes Peak and 15 nautical miles (28 km) south-southwest of Falla Bluff. Discovered in February 1931 by the British Australian New Zealand Antarctic Research Expedition (BANZARE) under Mawson, who named it for Sir George Pearce, Chairman of the Australian Antarctic Committee, 1929.

== See also ==
- Mill Peak
