= Stevenson Island (Antarctica) =

Island in the Colbeck Archipelago, Antarctica

- Location within Antarctica
- Etymology: J.B. Stevenson, member of the Australian Aurora Committee

Geography
- Location: Mac. Robertson Land
- Coordinates: 67°26′S 61°11′E
- Archipelago: Colbeck Archipelago
- Highest elevation: 120 m (390 ft)

Stevenson Island is a small island 120 m (390 ft) high, lying at the east side of Colbeck Archipelago, 2 nautical miles (3.7 km) northeast of Cape Simpson. Discovered in February 1931 by the British Australian New Zealand Antarctic Research Expedition (BANZARE) under Mawson. He named it for Captain J.B. Stevenson, Royal Navy, a member of the Australian Aurora Committee, 1916–17.

== See also ==
- List of Antarctic and sub-Antarctic islands
