= Stephenson Island =

Stephenson Island may refer to:

- Stephenson Island (California)
- Stephenson Island (Georgia)
- Stephenson Island (Wisconsin)
- Stephenson Island (British Columbia, Canada)
- Stephenson Island (Greenland)
- Stephenson Island (Philippines)
- Stephenson Island (North Island, New Zealand)

== See also ==
- Stevenson Island (Wyoming)
- Stevenson Island (Antarctica)
- Stevensons Island (South Island, New Zealand)
