= Thorfinn Islands =

Island group in Antarctica

Coordinates: 67°21′S 60°54′E

Thorfinn Islands is a group of small islands lying about 8 km (5 mi) off the Mawson Coast of Mac. Robertson Land in Antarctica, between Campbell Head and Cape Simpson. Mapped by Norwegian cartographers from air photos taken by the Lars Christensen Expedition, 1936–37, and named by them, apparently after the Norwegian whale catcher Thorfinn.
