= 1965 International Soccer League =

International Soccer League
- Season: 1965
- Teams: 9
- Champions: (Poland) Polonia Bytom
- Challenge Cup: (Poland) Polonia Bytom

Statistics of International Soccer League in season 1965.

== League standings ==
=== Section I ===
| Pos | Team | Pld | W | D | L | GF | GA | GD | Pts |
|---|---|---|---|---|---|---|---|---|---|
| 1 | (United States) New York Americans | 6 | 4 | 1 | 1 | 11 | 8 | +3 | 9 |
| 2 | (Brazil) Portuguesa | 6 | 4 | 0 | 2 | 18 | 11 | +7 | 8 |
| 3 | (Italy) Varese | 6 | 2 | 2 | 2 | 11 | 9 | +2 | 6 |
| 4 | (Germany) TSV Munich 1860 | 6 | 2 | 0 | 4 | 8 | 13 | −5 | 4 |
| 5 | (England) West Ham United | 6 | 1 | 1 | 4 | 9 | 16 | −7 | 3 |

=== Section II ===
| Pos | Team | Pld | W | D | L | GF | GA | GD | Pts |
|---|---|---|---|---|---|---|---|---|---|
| 1 | (Poland) Polonia Bytom | 6 | 3 | 3 | 0 | 13 | 4 | +9 | 9 |
| 2 | (Hungary) Ferencváros | 6 | 3 | 2 | 1 | 10 | 6 | +4 | 8 |
| 3 | (England) West Bromwich Albion | 6 | 1 | 2 | 3 | 6 | 13 | −7 | 4 |
| 4 | (Scotland) Kilmarnock F.C. | 6 | 1 | 1 | 4 | 5 | 11 | −6 | 3 |

== Championship finals ==
=== First leg ===
1965 International Soccer League final
31 Jul 1965
First leg

| Polonia Bytom (Poland) | 3–0 | (United States) New York Americans |
|---|---|---|
| Banaś 22'; Szmidt 68'; Jóźwiak 88' | Report |

Randall's Island Stadium, New York City
Referee: Leo Goldstein (USA)

Team details

Polonia Bytom
New York Americans

| GK | Edward Szymkowiak |
| DF | Paweł Orzechowski |
| DF | Walter Winkler |
| DF | Zygmunt Anczok |
| DF | Antoni Nieroba |
| MF | Ryszard Grzegorczyk |
| MF | Jan Banaś |
| MF | Zygmunt Szmidt |
| FW | Norbert Pogrzeba |
| FW | Jan Liberda |
| FW | Eugeniusz Faber | (substituted off) 46' |
Substitutions:
| FW | Jerzy Jóźwiak | (substituted on) 46' |

| GK | Uwe Schwartz |
| DF | Reszneki |
| DF | Young |
| DF | Rick |
| DF | Winter |
| MF | Horvath |
| MF | Albrecht |
| MF | Meyer |
| FW | Kosmidis |
| FW | Neubauer |
| FW | Howfield |

=== Second leg ===
4 August 1965
Second leg

| Polonia Bytom (Poland) | 2–1 | (United States) New York Americans |
|---|---|---|
| Szmidt 30'; Jóźwiak 46' | Report | Neubauer 28' |

Randall's Island Stadium, New York City
Referee: John di Salvatore (USA)

Note: Polonia Bytom won 5–1 on aggregate.

== American Challenge Cup ==
Polonia Bytom defeated Dukla Prague, 2–0 and 1–1, on goal aggregate.
