= Howard Bay =

Howard Bay may refer to:

- Howard Bay (Antarctica), a body of water in Antarctica
- Howard Bay (designer) (1912–1986), American scenic, lighting and costume designer
