= Oom Bay =

Bay

Coordinates: 67°26′S 60°44′E

Oom Bay is a well-defined bay, 2 mi wide, indenting the Mawson coast between Cape Bruce and Campbell Head. Discovered in February 1931 by the British Australian and New Zealand Antarctic Research Expedition (BANZARE) under Douglas Mawson, who named it for Lieutenant K.E. Oom, RAN, cartographer with the expedition.
