= Hechtman =

Hechtman is a German surname. Notable people with the surname include:

- J. F. Hechtman (1854–1933), American politician
- Ken Hechtman (born 1967), Canadian freelance journalist

== See also ==
- Hecht (surname)
- Heckman
