= Stedet Island =

Island in Utstikkar Bay, Antarctica

- Location within Antarctica

Geography
- Location: Antarctica
- Coordinates: 67°33′S 61°27′E

Administration
- Administered under the Antarctic Treaty System

Demographics
- Population: Uninhabited

Stedet Island is a small island lying at the head of Utstikkar Bay, just north of Falla Bluff, Mac. Robertson Land. Mapped by Norwegian cartographers from air photos taken by the Lars Christensen Expedition, 1936–37, and named Stedet (the place).

== See also ==
- List of Antarctic and sub-Antarctic islands
