= Kamelen Island =

Island in Antarctica

- Location within Antarctica

Geography
- Location: Antarctica
- Coordinates: 67°31′S 61°37′E

Administration
- Administered under the Antarctic Treaty System

Demographics
- Population: Uninhabited

Kamelen Island is an island about 45 metres (150 ft) high, lying 6 kilometres (3 nmi) southwest of the Einstøding Islands in the northern part of the Stanton Group, Antarctica. This island was mapped from air photographs by the Lars Christensen Expedition (1936–37) and named Kamelen (the camel).

== See also ==
- List of Antarctic and sub-Antarctic islands
