= Mill Peak =

Mountain in Antarctica

Mill Peak (67°58′S 61°8′E) is a prominent peak, 1,760 metres (5,770 ft) high, rising above the Antarctic ice sheet 10 nautical miles (19 km) south of Pearce Peak and 30 nautical miles (56 km) south of Cape Simpson. it was discovered in February 1931 by the British Australian New Zealand Antarctic Research Expedition under Douglas Mawson, who named it for Dr. Hugh Robert Mill.
