= Campbell Head =

Headland on Mawson Coast, Antarctica

Coordinates: 67°25′S 60°40′E

Campbell Head is a bold headland on the western side of Oom Bay, Mawson Coast, Antarctica. Discovered in February 1931 by the British Australian and New Zealand Antarctic Research Expedition (BANZARE) under Douglas Mawson, who named it for Flight Lieutenant Stuart Campbell, RAAF, pilot with the expedition.
