= Byrd Head =

Headland on the Mawson Coast

Coordinates: 67°27′S 61°01′E

Byrd Head is a conspicuous, rocky headland on the Mawson Coast 1 mi southeast of Colbeck Archipelago, just west of Howard Bay. Discovered in February 1931 by the British Australian and New Zealand Antarctic Research Expedition (BANZARE) under Douglas Mawson, who named it for R. Admiral Richard E. Byrd, U.S. Navy (USN).
