= Nixon Peabody =

Law firm

Nixon Peabody LLP
- Headquarters: 53 State Street, Boston, Massachusetts, U.S.
- No. of offices: 16
- No. of attorneys: 700
- Major practice areas: General practice
- Key people: Steve Zubiago, CEO & Managing Partner; Andrew Glincher, Senior Chairman and Partner
- Date founded: December 31, 1999 (merger)
- Company type: Limited liability partnership
- Website: www.nixonpeabody.com

Nixon Peabody LLP is a Boston-based law firm with over 700 attorneys collaborating across major practice areas in cities across the U.S. and international offices in London, Hong Kong, and Shanghai. In addition to the firm's Boston headquarters, it maintains U.S. office locations in New York City, Washington, D.C., Chicago, San Francisco, Los Angeles, Palo Alto, Albany, Buffalo, Manchester, Rochester, and Providence.

The firm works in commercial litigation, IP litigation, product liability, government investigations, white-collar defense, arts and cultural institutions, and Indian law and gaming. They have represented clients such as JetBlue, Constellation Brands, Corning Incorporated, and Gannett Co., among others. Additionally, the firm has represented parties in the financing of new stadiums for the Mets and Yankees. The firm has nearly thirty teams that focus on specific industries or areas of law.

Stephen Zubiago serves as Nixon Peabody's chief executive officer and managing partner, a role he has held since February 2021. Andrew Glincher is the firm's senior chairman.

== History ==
Nixon Peabody was formed by the 1999 merger of two firms that began practicing more than a century ago: Nixon, Hargrave, Devans & Doyle LLP and Peabody & Brown. Nixon Hargrave was originally a Rochester, New York, firm that had grown to become one of the largest law firms in New York.

In 2000, Nixon Peabody merged with Sixbey Friedman Leedom & Ferguson in Northern Virginia, doubling the size of its intellectual property practice.

The firm expanded into California in 2001 through a merger with Lillick & Charles, founded in San Francisco in 1897.

In December 2002, Nixon Peabody merged with the 150-year-old Boston firm of Hutchins, Wheeler & Dittmar, adding fifty attorneys in the areas of business, litigation, and health services.

In late 2008, Nixon Peabody declared an objective to double the size of the firm in the next three or four years. The firm said it would hire up to 100 attorneys from the dissolving firm Thelen LLP, and in October took on 25 lawyers in Paris, a move that led to a legal dispute with UK firm Taylor Wessing.

In February 2015, Chicago-based mid-sized law firm Ungaretti & Harris LLP merged into Nixon Peabody, adding 100 attorneys and experience in corporate, health care, real estate, litigation, public finance, intellectual property, and government relations.

In October 2015, Nixon Peabody consolidated operations with CWL Partners, a firm based in Hong Kong. The two firms had been formally associated with each other since 2010. The combined firm is known as Nixon Peabody CWL in Hong Kong but will remain as Nixon Peabody LLP in the U.S., Europe, and the firm's Shanghai, China, office.

== Pro bono ==
In 2011, Nixon Peabody attorneys spent an average of 56 hours on pro bono matters, or 3.7% of their billable hours. The firm as a whole contributed 37,539 hours to pro bono work. The firm "targets 3% of billable hours annually for pro bono work."

Nixon Peabody has worked on behalf of a wide range of pro bono clients, including microfinance work veterans' affairs, asylum and immigration cases, domestic violence matters and with various legal aid organizations on a wide range of matters, in some cases as part of a corporate partnership (the firm's Albany office partners with General Electric's Global Research division on community pro bono matters).

In 2009, the Manchester office launched the Nixon Peabody Domestic Protection Team, aimed at assisting victims of domestic violence. In 2012, Nixon Peabody partners co-authored the amicus brief by the New York State Bar Association in Fisher v. University of Texas, et al. The NYSBA brief argues that the government has a compelling interest in promoting diversity in the legal profession, which cannot happen without meaningful diversity in the undergraduate pipeline.

== Litigation ==
Chambers describes Nixon Peabody's litigation activities as involving commercial litigation, IP litigation, product liability, government investigations, white-collar defense, arts and cultural institutions, and Indian law and gaming. Lawyers at the Washington office perform much of their work at the Court of Federal Claims.

== Offices ==
Nixon Peabody has 13 US offices and three international offshoots in London, Hong Kong, and Shanghai.

== See also ==
- Mudge Rose Guthrie Alexander & Ferdon
