= 1963 International Soccer League =

International Soccer League
- Season: 1963
- Teams: 14
- Champions: (England) West Ham United
- Challenge Cup: (Czechoslovakia) Dukla Prague (2nd)

Statistics of International Soccer League in season 1963.

== League standings ==
=== Section I ===
Pos	Team	Pld	W	D	L	GF	GA	GD	Pts
1	(England) West Ham United	6	3	2	1	14	10	+4	8
2	(Italy) A.C. Mantova	6	3	1	2	15	10	+5	7
3	(Scotland) Kilmarnock F.C.	6	2	3	1	17	13	+4	7
4	(Brazil) Sport Recife	6	2	2	2	13	13	0	6
5	(Germany) Preussen Munster	6	3	0	3	13	16	−3	6
6	(Mexico) Club Deportivo Oro	6	1	2	3	13	18	−5	4
7	(France) Valenciennes FC	6	2	0	4	8	13	−5	4

=== Section II ===
Pos	Team	Pld	W	D	L	GF	GA	GD	Pts
1	(Poland) Górnik Zabrze	6	4	1	1	17	6	+11	9
2	(Socialist Federal Republic of Yugoslavia) Dinamo Zagreb	6	3	1	2	14	11	+3	7
3	(Austria) Wiener AC	6	3	1	2	12	13	−1	7
4	(Hungary) Újpesti Dózsa	6	3	0	3	10	10	0	6
5	(Portugal) Belenenses	6	1	3	2	7	8	−1	5
6	(Spain) Real Valladolid	6	2	1	3	9	15	−6	5
7	(Sweden) Helsingborgs IF	6	1	1	4	10	14	−4	3

== Championship finals ==
=== First leg ===
1963

West Ham United (England)	1–1	(Poland) Górnik Zabrze
	Report

Polo Grounds, New York City

=== Second leg ===
1963

West Ham United (England)	1–0	(Poland) Górnik Zabrze
	Report

Polo Grounds, New York City

Team details

West Ham
Górnik Zabrze

West Ham United won 2–1 on aggregate.

== American Challenge Cup ==
- Dukla Prague defeated West Ham United, 1–0 and 1–1, on goal aggregate.
