= 1962 International Soccer League =

International Soccer League
- Season: 1962
- Teams: 12
- Champions: (Brazil) America-RJ
- Challenge Cup: (Czechoslovakia) Dukla Prague

Statistics of International Soccer League III in season 1962.

== League standings ==
=== Section I ===
Pos	Team	Pld	W	D	L	GF	GA	GD	Pts
1	(Brazil) America-RJ	5	3	2	0	11	8	+3	8
2	(Germany) SSV Reutlingen	5	3	1	1	6	1	+5	7
3	(Mexico) C.D. Guadalajara	5	1	2	2	7	7	0	4
4	(Italy) Palermo	5	1	2	2	7	8	−1	4
5	(Scotland) Dundee FC	5	1	2	2	9	11	−2	4
6	(Socialist Federal Republic of Yugoslavia) Hajduk Split	5	1	1	3	8	10	−2	3 (Note: Some sources have 1 win, 3 draws, 1 loss and 3 points, which is obviously incorrect if there are 2 points for a win and 1 point for a draw. This is also obviously incorrect since this the total number of wins must equal the total number of losses for the section.)

=== Section II ===
Pos	Team	Pld	W	D	L	GF	GA	GD	Pts
1	(Portugal) Belenenses	5	4	1	0	14	6	+8	9
2	(Austria) Wiener AC	5	2	2	1	11	17	−6	6
3	(Greece) Panathinaikos	5	1	3	1	9	12	−3	5
4	(Hungary) MTK Budapest	5	1	2	2	10	12	−2	4
5	(Sweden) Elfsborg	5	0	3	2	12	16	−4	3
6	(Spain) Real Oviedo	5	0	3	2	7	10	−3	3

== Championship finals ==
=== First leg ===
1 August 1962

América (RJ) (Brazil)	2–1	(Portugal) Belenenses
	Report

Randalls Island, New York City

=== Second leg ===
5 August 1962

América (RJ) (Brazil)	1–0	(Portugal) Belenenses
	Report

Randalls Island, New York City

América won 3–1 on aggregate.

Team details

America
Belenenses

== American Challenge Cup ==
- Dukla Prague defeated America-RJ, 1–1 and 2–1, on goal aggregate.
