= Uwe Schwart =

American soccer player

Personal information
- Position: Goalkeeper

Senior career*
Years	Team	Apps	(Gls)
1961–1963	Toronto Roma		
1964	New York Hota Bavarian SC		
1964	Montreal Italica		

International career
1964	United States	1	(0)
- * Club domestic league appearances and goals

Uwe Schwart is a former U.S. soccer goalkeeper who earned one cap with the U.S. national team.

== Professional career ==
In the early 1960s, Uwe Schwart played in Canada, first for Toronto Roma FC in the National Soccer League, and later in the Eastern Canada Professional Soccer League. In 1964, he returned to the Eastern Canada Professional Soccer League to play with Montreal Italica. He helped Toronto Roma win the 1961 National League title and then the 1962 Eastern Canada League title.

In 1964, he moved from Montreal to join New York Hota of the German American Soccer League. He then played for the New Yorkers in the International Soccer League in 1965. He was both the league's top goalkeeper and the Dwight D. Eisenhower Trophy winner as the league MVP.

== National team ==
On May 27, 1964, Schwart was the goalkeeper in the 10–0 loss to England. He never played for the U.S. after that game.
