= Montreal Concordia =

Montreal Concordia FC was a Canadian soccer team based in Montreal, Quebec, formerly known as Sparta FC and then Canadian Alouettes FC. The club won Canadian titles in 1959 and 1961.

In the 1950s, the club was known as Canadian Czechoslovak Sparta FC Montreal, or simply Sparta FC. In 1956, the team won the Quebec Cup and also represented the province in the Challenge Trophy playdowns for the first time. The team was coached that year by Doug McMahon.

In 1959, with real estate businessman Joe Slyomovics serving as president, the team changed its name to Canadian Alouettes FC. In September, the team won their Canadian title, defeating the Westminster Royals FC to lift the Carling's Red Cap Trophy.

In 1960, Slyomivics changed the team name to Montreal Concordia FC. In the National Soccer League, Concordia finished in third place in the league standings.

In 1961, Concordia FC played in both the National Soccer League and the International Soccer League. They finished second in the National Soccer League standings. On 29 July, Concordia defeated Vancouver Firefighters 1–0 in Montreal's Faillon Stadium to capture their second Canadian championship in three years.

== Coaches ==
- Doug McMahon
- Alex Skocen
- Norberto Yacono
- Skender "Alex" Perolli (1961)

== Matches in the 1961 International Soccer League ==
23 May 1961	Montreal Concordia	0–1	Everton	Montreal, Canada
	Hector Lopez (red card) 87'	Preview post	Billy Bingham (red card) 22'; Alec Young 72'	Stadium: Molson Stadium; Attendance: 8,000; Referee: Bill Betts

30 May 1961	Montreal Concordia	2–0	Dinamo Bucharest	Montreal, Canada
	Tito Maule 25'; Apard Kiraly 50'	news		Stadium: Molson Stadium; Referee: Peter Rhodes

1 June 1961	Montreal Concordia	1–1	Besiktas	Montreal, Canada
9:00pm	José Sanches 48'	news	Şenol Birol 16'	Stadium: Molson Stadium; Attendance: 7000; Referee: Peter Rhodes

27 June 1961	Montreal Concordia	4–0	Hapoel Petah Tikva	Montreal, Canada
	Humberto Gambaro 40', 44'; Ken Leek 51'; Sam Lawrie 88'			Stadium: Molson Stadium; Attendance: 10,000

4 July 1961	Montreal Concordia	1–1	Espanyol	Montreal, Canada
	Sam Lawrie 67'		Antonio Camps 7'	Stadium: Molson Stadium; Attendance: 4,500

6 July 1961	Montreal Concordia	2–2	Dukla Prague	Montreal, Canada
	Tommy Barrett 26' (pen.); Ken Leek 42'		Josef Jelínek 25'; Josef Vacenovský 65'

9 July 1961	Montreal Concordia	2–2	Red Star Belgrade

11 July 1961	Montreal Concordia	3–2	Rapid Wien	Montreal, Canada
	Humberto Gambaro 21'; Tommy Barrett 31' (pen.); Ron Heckman 87'		Rudi Flögel 4'; Walter Seitl 9'	Stadium: Molson Stadium; Attendance: 4,500; Referee: Mike Devine

18 July 1961	Montreal Concordia	3–1	AS Monaco	Montreal, Canada
	Humberto Gambaro (2); Jose Sanches		Bert Carlier	Stadium: Molson Stadium; Attendance: 4,500

24 July 1961	Montreal Concordia	2–2	Shamrock Rovers	Montreal, Canada
	Olivio Lacerdo 38'; José Sanches 51'		Liam Hennessy 29'; Tommy Hamilton 59'	Stadium: Molson Stadium; Attendance: 400
