= Einstøding Islands =

Island group in Antarctica

- Location within Antarctica

Geography
- Location: Antarctica
- Coordinates: 67°28′S 61°41′E

Administration
- Administered under the Antarctic Treaty System

Demographics
- Population: Uninhabited

The Einstøding Islands are a group of three small islands, 4 kilometres (2 nmi) north of the Stanton Group off the coast of Mac. Robertson Land. They were mapped by Norwegian cartographers from air photos taken by the Lars Christensen Expedition, 1936–37, and named "Einstødingane".

== See also ==
- List of Antarctic and sub-Antarctic islands
