= Moyes Peak =

Mountain in Antarctica

In Antarctica, Moyes Peak (67°45′S 61°13′E) is a small rock peak projecting slightly above the ice sheet 2 nautical miles (3.7 km) north of Pearce Peak, 12 nautical miles (22 km) southwest of Falla Bluff.

Discovered in February 1931 by the British Australian New Zealand Antarctic Research Expedition (BANZARE) under Mawson, and named by him for Commander Morton H. Moyes, RAN, cartographer of the expedition. The approximate position of this peak was verified in aerial photographs taken by the U.S. Navy Operation Highjump on February 26, 1947.
