= Zagłębie Sosnowiec =

Association football club in Poland

Coordinates: 50°16′37.76″N 19°6′13.08″E

- Full name: Zagłębie Sosnowiec Spółka Akcyjna
- Nicknames: Chłopcy znad Brynicy (Boys from the Brynica); Zagłębiacy (People from the Basin)
- Founded: 1906; 120 years ago
- Ground: Zagłębie Sports Park
- Capacity: 11,600
- Chairman: Marcin Jaroszewski
- Manager: Tomasz Łuczywek
- League: III liga, group III
- 2025–26: II liga, 15th of 18 (relegated)
- Website: zaglebie.eu
Home colours	Away colours

Zagłębie Sosnowiec (Polish pronunciation: [zaˈɡwɛmbjɛ sɔsˈnɔvjɛts]) is a Polish professional football club based in Sosnowiec. They compete in group III of the III liga in the 2026–27 season, following relegation from the 2025–26 II liga.

The club was established in 1945. It has won Polish Cup four times (1962, 1963, 1977, 1978), and has finished as runner-up in the Polish championship four times (1955, 1964, 1967, 1972). Apart from football, the organization of Zagłębie has other departments, such as ice-hockey (KH Zagłębie Sosnowiec; five times Polish champion: 1980, 1981, 1982, 1983, 1985) and men's basketball (twice Polish champion: 1985, 1986).

== History ==
The history of Zagłębie Sosnowiec dates back to 1906, when the city of Sosnowiec belonged to Congress Poland, Russian Empire. In that year, a group of young workers of the Milowice Steelworks formed a sports organization. Their activities were mostly concentrated on playing football at suburban meadows. In 1908, local activist Aleksander Rene was arrested by the Okhrana, and accused of forming an illegal Polish sports organization. Imprisoned in Łódź, he sent a letter to a Russian Governor, who resided in Piotrków Trybunalski, asking for permission to form a Sosnowiec branch of the Union Sports Club from Sankt Petersburg. He was denied, so he wrote again, to the Union headquarters. With the permission of the Sankt Petersburg club, Rene, after leaving prison, formed the team of Union Sosnowiec, which in the first half of the 1910s played several friendly games against local teams.

During World War I, sports activities were cancelled in Sosnowiec. In 1918, Sports Association Victoria was formed. Among its players was famous singer Jan Kiepura. In 1919, Sports Association Sosnowiec was formed by Aleksander Reine. After 12 years, in 1931, both clubs merged to create the team called Unia Sosnowiec. The new team was among the best sides in the region of Zagłębie Dąbrowskie, which in the 1930s had its own regional league, the Zagłębie A-Class.

In 1933, Unia Sosnowiec won the league, qualifying to the Ekstraklasa playoffs, where it lost to Naprzód Lipiny. In 1934, Unia again turned out to be the regional winner, and again it lost the playoffs, this time to Śląsk Świętochłowice. Third attempt at the Ekstraklasa promotion came in 1939. Again Unia, the regional champion, lost the playoffs to both Śląsk Świętochłowice and Fablok Chrzanów. Among the players of Unia's youth teams was Wieslaw Ociepka, who later became chairman of the Polish Football Association (PZPN).

During World War II, Unia played unofficial, conspirational games against local rivals. In 1945, officials and players of Unia formed a team called RKS Sosnowiec, which was soon renamed into RKU Sosnowiec. Its chairman was Major Marian Rodza, military commandant of the city. First postwar manager was Józef Słonecki, who in the 1920s was a player of Pogoń Lwów. In 1946, RKU qualified to the Ekstraklasa playoffs. In the 1/8 finals, it beat Gedania Gdańsk 6–2, to lose 0–4 to AKS Chorzów in the quarterfinals. During the game, which took place in Chorzów, clashes erupted between supporters of both teams, and the game was cancelled. In 1947, RKU was in Group Two of the Ekstraklasa qualifiers. This group was won by AKS Chorzów, RKU was the fourth team, behind AKS, Cracovia and Rymer Radlin.

In 1949, after changing its name into Stal Sosnowiec, the team qualified to the Second Division, remaining there until 1954, when it was finally promoted to the Ekstraklasa. In the 1955 Ekstraklasa, Stal Sosnowiec was a sensation, as it was the runner up, finishing the season in the second spot, only behind CWKS Warsaw. Stal had 27 points, while CWKS had only one point more. In 1956, Stal was the 10th team (out of 12), in 1957, 7th, and was relegated in 1958, to return to the Ekstraklasa in 1960. Stal remained in the top league until 1974, finishing as the runners-up thrice (1964, 1967, 1972).

Meanwhile, in 1962, Stal changed name into GKS Zagłębie. In the mid-1960s, the team from Sosnowiec was among the best Polish sides, as it once won Polish silver, three times bronze, and two times the Polish Cup: in 1962, after beating 2-1 Górnik Zabrze, and in 1963, after beating 2–0 Ruch Chorzów. In 1964, Józef Gałeczka was Ekstraklasa's top scorer. Among other notable players of that time was Andrzej Jarosik, twice Polish top scorer (1970, 1971). Furthermore, Włodzimierz Mazur was the top scorer in 1977.

In 1977 and 1978, Zagłębie twice won the Polish Cup, and in 1979, Wojciech Rudy was named Best Polish Player of the Year.

In 1986, Zagłębie, after 11 years, was relegated to the Second Division. It remained there until June 1989, when Zagłębie returned to the Ekstraklasa. Among its top players were Marek Bęben, Ryszard Czerwiec and Maciej Mizia. After promotion, the games of Zagłębie were attended by thousands of people, with the record, 28,000, watching the match against Górnik Zabrze.

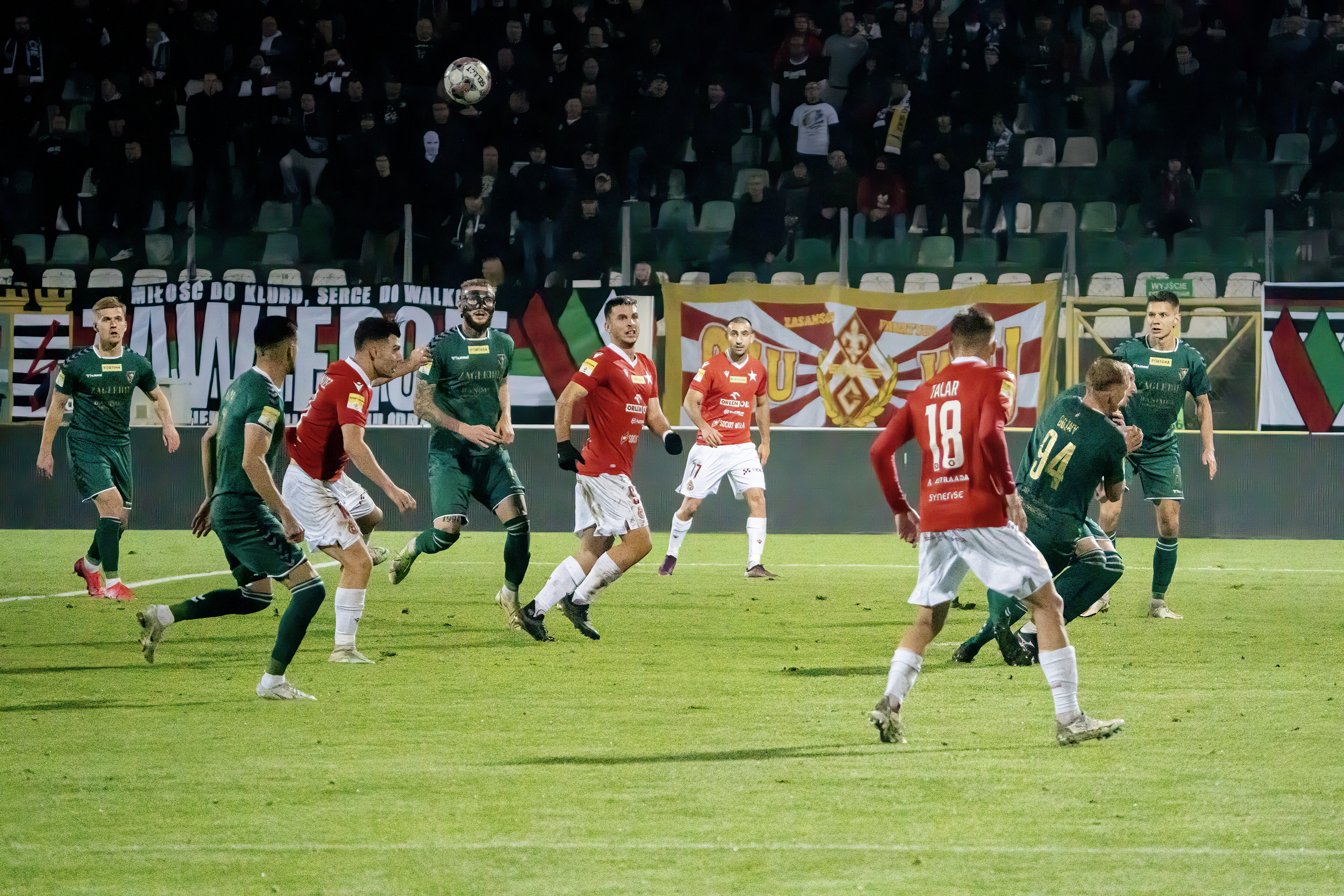
Home game with Wisła Kraków in the 2022–23 I liga

After the 1991 season, Zagłębie avoided relegation in the playoffs, in which it beat Jagiellonia Białystok 0–2, 2–0, and 4–2 in the penalty shootout. In 1992, Zagłębie was relegated, even though among its players was Marek Koniarek. Due to financial problems, the team was soon relegated to the third level. The club was then dissolved.

In 1995, Zagłębie returned in the 5th division, and soon qualified to the fourth, and then third division. In 2000, Zagłębie won promotion to the second level. In 2001, with a new Italian sponsor ERGOM, Zagłębie planned to win promotion back to the top league. Instead, the team was relegated.

In 2004, Zagłębie won promotion to the Second Division. Finally, after the 2006–07 season, Zagłębie returned to the Ekstraklasa. Among its top players were Jacek Berensztajn, Jakub Wierzchowski and Adrian Mierzejewski. The 2007–08 Ekstraklasa season was a failure, as Zagłębie gathered only 16 points, and was relegated again. Among its players at that time was Patryk Małecki.

== Stadium ==
Zagłębie Sosnowiec play their home matches at the Zagłębie Sports Park, with a 11,600 capacity.

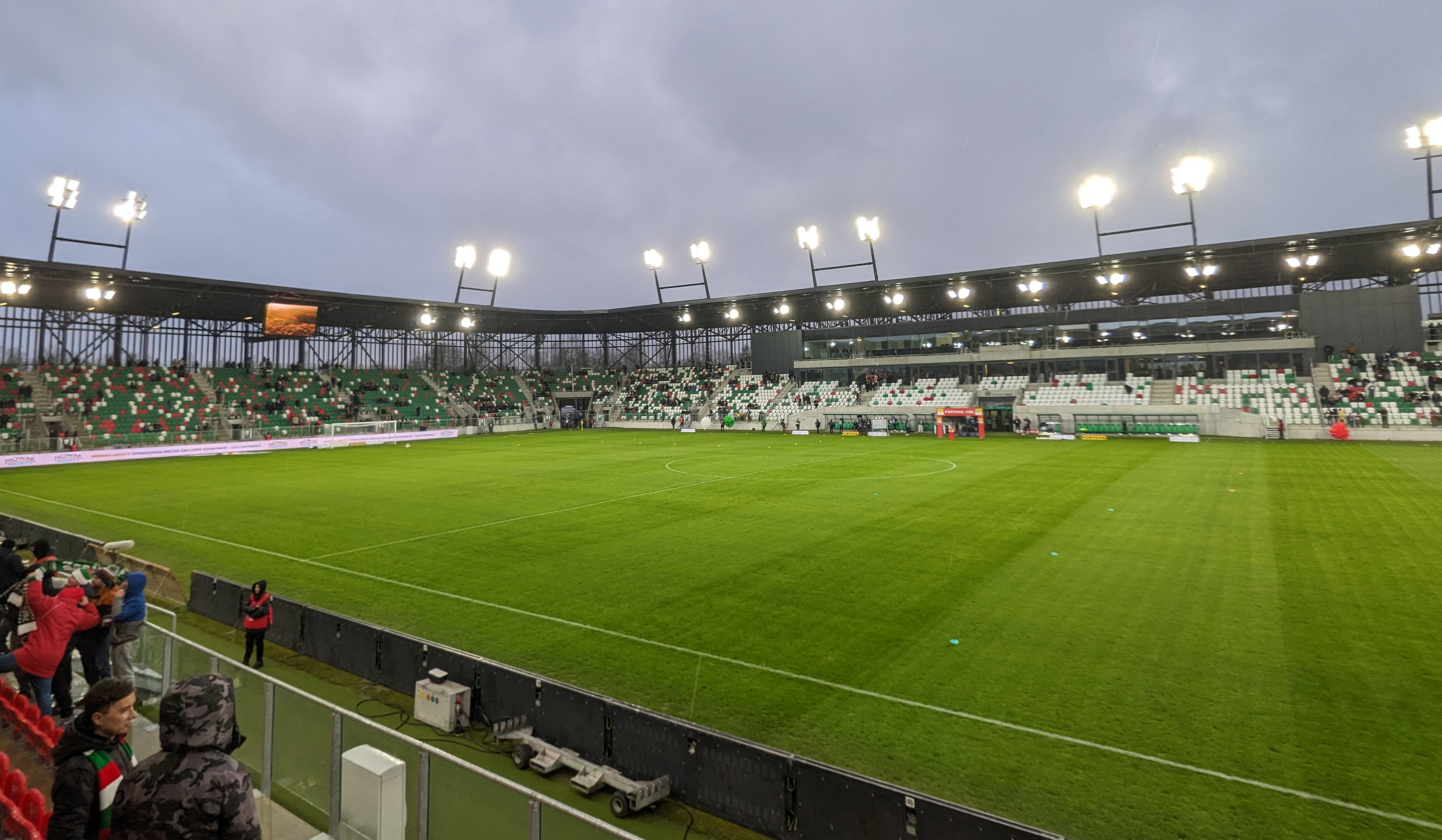
Zagłębie Sports Park

== Players ==
=== Current squad ===
As of 16 August 2026

Note: Flags indicate national team as defined under FIFA eligibility rules; some limited exceptions apply. Players may hold more than one non-FIFA nationality.

No.	Pos.	Nation	Player
1	GK	POL	Dawid Kudła
3	DF	POL	Szymon Krawiec
4	DF	POL	Kacper Mironowicz
5	DF	POL	Igor Kośmicki
6	DF	POL	Oskar Sikorski
7	FW	POL	Maksymilian Podgórski
8	MF	POL	Patryk Gogół
10	MF	POL	Borys Roguski
11	FW	POL	Iwo Kupidura
13	DF	POL	Sebastian Kopeć
14	MF	POL	Mateusz Chmarek
17	MF	POL	Leon Madej
19	MF	POL	Marcel Predenkiewicz
20	MF	POL	Damian Tront

No.	Pos.	Nation	Player
22	MF	POL	Igor Dziedzic
23	DF	POL	Bartosz Chęciński
27	DF	POL	Bartosz Boruń
29	DF	POL	Maksymilian Rozwandowicz (captain)
33	MF	POL	Aleksander Tobolik
37	DF	POL	Adrian Gryszkiewicz
43	MF	POL	Szymon Jarek
45	MF	POL	Jakub Pawłowski
77	MF	POL	Bartosz Zawojski
79	GK	POL	Mateusz Kabała
86	MF	ESP	Adrián Rodríguez
87	GK	POL	Kacper Siuta
93	MF	FRA	Moussa Soumaré
95	MF	POL	Michał Barć

== Honours ==
=== Domestic ===
- Ekstraklasa
  - Runners-up: 1955, 1963–64, 1966–67, 1971–72
  - Third place: 1962, 1962–63, 1964–65
- Polish Cup
  - Winners: 1961–62, 1962–63, 1976–77, 1977–78
  - Runners-up: 1970–71

=== International ===
- International Soccer League
  - Winners: 1964
- UEFA Intertoto Cup
  - Semi-finalists: 1966–67

=== Youth teams ===
- Polish U-19 Championship
  - Runners-up: 1963
  - Third place: 1965

== Basketball team ==
In 1983, American Kent Washington won the Polish Basketball Cup with Zagłębie Sosnowiec.

== See also ==
- Football in Poland
