= 1960 International Soccer League =

International Soccer League
- Season: 1960
- Teams: 12
- Champions: (Brazil) Bangu

The 1960 season was the inaugural edition of the International Soccer League, a soccer competition in the United States that invited teams from Europe and South America during their off-seasons. The inaugural season featured 12 teams, including the U.S.-based New York Americans, who were divided into two groups with round-robin play that began on May 25. Most matches were played in the New York City metropolitan area. The top team in each group—Kilmarnock from Scotland and Bangu from Brazil—advanced to the championship. Bangu won 2–0 in the championship, which was played at the Polo Grounds in New York City on August 6 with 25,440 in attendance.

== League standings ==
Section I
Pos	Team	Pld	W	D	L	GF	GA	GD	Pts	Qualification
1	(Scotland) Kilmarnock	5	4	1	0	11	3	+8	9	Qualified to the Second Stage
2	(England) Burnley	5	3	1	1	16	7	+9	7	
3	(France) Nice	5	1	3	1	7	10	−3	5	
4	(United States) New York Americans	5	1	2	2	8	13	−5	4	
5	(West Germany) Bayern Munich	5	1	1	3	7	10	−3	3	
6	(Northern Ireland) Glenavon	5	1	0	4	9	15	−6	2	

Section II
Pos	Team	Pld	W	D	L	GF	GA	GD	Pts	Qualification
1	(Brazil) Bangu	5	4	1	0	14	3	+11	9	Qualified to the Second Stage
2	(Socialist Federal Republic of Yugoslavia) Red Star Belgrade	5	3	1	1	13	5	+8	7	
3	(Italy) Sampdoria	5	2	1	2	12	14	−2	5	
4	(Portugal) Sporting Lisboa	4	2	0	2	6	11	−5	4	
5	(Sweden) Norrköping	5	1	1	3	10	15	−5	3	
6	(Austria) Rapid Wien	4	0	0	4	7	14	−7	0	

== Championship final ==
August 6, 1960
2:40 P.M.

Bangu (Brazil)	2–0	(Scotland) Kilmarnock F.C.
Válter Santos 3', 88'	Report

Polo Grounds, New York, New York
Attendance: 25,440

Team details

Bangu
Kilmarnock
