= Heckmann =

Heckmann is a surname. Notable people with the surname include:

- Alfred Heckmann (1914–1993), Luftwaffe flying ace of World War II
- Bradlee Heckmann, American biologist
- Friedrich Heckmann (born 1941), director of the research institute European forum for migration studies
- Gustav Heckmann (1898–1996), German educator and philosopher
- Harald Heckmann (1924–2023), German musicologist
- Otto Heckmann (1901–1983), German astronomer
  - 1650 Heckmann, asteroid named after Otto
- Patrick Heckmann (born 1992), German basketball player
- Wilhelm Heckmann (1897–1995), German concert and easy listening musician
- Willi Heckmann (born 1952), German wrestler
- Wolf Heckmann (1929–2006), German journalist

== See also ==
- Heckman, surname
- Heckmann Island, Antarctica
- Liselotte Schramm-Heckmann (1904–1995), German painter
- Stefan Heckmanns (born 1963), German tennis player
