= Heckman =

Heckman is a surname. Notable people with the surname include:

- Charles Adam Heckman, Union Army general during the American Civil War
- James Heckman (born 1944), American economist
- John Heckman (1785–1871), politician in Nova Scotia
- Ron Heckman (1929–1990), English footballer
- Ryan Heckman (born 1974), American skier
- Steven Heckman, American skier

== See also ==
- Heckmann, surname
