= 1964 International Soccer League =

International Soccer League
- Season: 1964
- Teams: 10
- Champions: (Poland) Zagłębie Sosnowiec
- Challenge Cup: (Czechoslovakia) Dukla Prague (3rd)
- Top goalscorer: Gerhard Zebrowski (4 goals)

Statistics of International Soccer League in season 1964.

== League standings ==
=== Group I ===
Pos	Team	Pld	W	D	L	GF	GA	GD	Pts
1	(Germany) SV Werder Bremen	6	4	2	0	18	10	+8	10
2	(Scotland) Heart of Midlothian F.C.	6	4	1	1	7	5	+2	9
3	(Italy) Lanerossi-Vicenza S.S.	6	2	2	2	12	11	+1	6
4	(England) Blackburn Rovers F.C.	6	1	1	4	7	11	−4	3
5	(Brazil) E.C. Bahia	6	0	2	4	5	12	−7	2

Source: soccerstats.us

=== Group II ===
Pos	Team	Pld	W	D	L	GF	GA	GD	Pts
1	(Poland) Zagłębie Sosnowiec	6	4	2	0	16	7	+9	10
2	(Austria) SV Schwechat	6	2	3	1	11	10	+1	7
3	(Socialist Federal Republic of Yugoslavia) Red Star Belgrade	6	2	3	1	12	12	0	7
4	(Portugal) Vitória Guimarães	6	1	3	2	5	6	−1	5
5	(Greece) AEK Athens	6	0	1	5	3	12	−9	1

Source: soccerstats.us

== Finals ==
=== First leg ===
30 July 1964
First leg

Zagłębie Sosnowiec (Poland)	4–0	(West Germany) Werder Bremen
Krawiarz 8'; Szmidt 38'; Gałeczka 81'; Fulczyk 82'	Report

Downing Stadium, New York City
Attendance: 9,344
Referee: Leo Goldstein (United States)

=== Second leg ===
2 August 1964
Second leg

Zagłębie Sosnowiec (Poland)	1–0	(West Germany) Werder Bremen
Piecyk 36'	Report

Downing Stadium, New York City
Attendance: 5,770

Team details

Zagłębie Sosnowie
Werder Bremen

Note: Zagłębie Sosnowiec won 5–0 on aggregate.

== American Challenge Cup ==
- Dukla Prague defeated Zagłębie Sosnowiec 3–1 and 1–1, on goal aggregate.
