= Walter Winkler =

Polish footballer

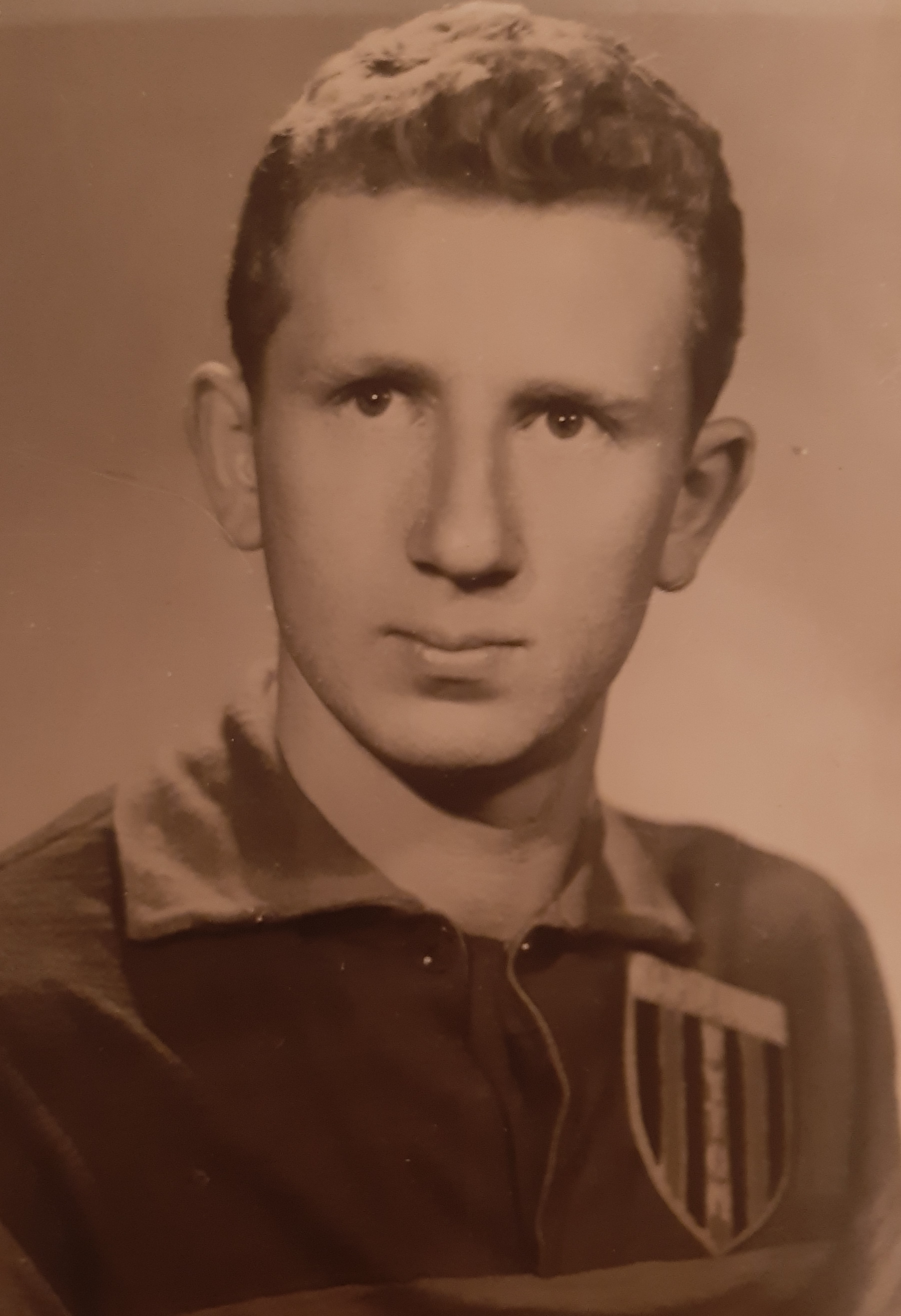

Personal information
- Full name: Jerzy Walter Winkler
- Date of birth: 2 February 1943
- Place of birth: Piekary Śląskie, Poland
- Date of death: 4 June 2014 (aged 71)
- Place of death: Bytom, Poland
- Position: Defender

Senior career*
Years	Team	Apps	(Gls)
1960–1974	Polonia Bytom		
1974–1976	RC Lens	16	(0)
1976	Polonia Bytom		

International career
1966–1971	Poland	23	(0)

Managerial career
- Silesia Miechowice
- Olimpia Piekary Śląskie
- 1994–1995: Polonia Bytom
- * Club domestic league appearances and goals

Walter Winkler (2 February 1943 – 4 June 2014) was a Polish footballer who played as a defender. He played 23 times for Poland.

== Honours ==
Polonia Bytom

- Ekstraklasa: 1962
