= Cape Simpson =

- Cape
- Coordinates: 67°28′S 61°8′W
- Location: Ufs Island
- Offshore water bodies: Weddell Sea

Area
  - Total: Antarctica

Cape Simpson is a high rocky bluff at the north end of Ufs Island, forming the east side of the entrance to Howard Bay.

Discovered in February 1931 by the British Australian New Zealand Antarctic Research Expedition (BANZARE) under Mawson. He named it for A. A. Simpson of the Royal Geographical Society of Australasia, who helped finance Mawson's Antarctic expeditions.
