= Claude Peretti =

French footballer (1942–2020)

Personal information
- Date of birth: 24 February 1942
- Place of birth: Nice, France
- Date of death: 8 September 2020 (aged 78)
- Height: 1.72 m (5 ft 8 in)
- Position: Right midfielder

Youth career
- 1958–1960: Nice

Senior career*
Years	Team	Apps	(Gls)
1960–1963	Monaco	3	(2)
1963–1964	Marseille	29	(10)
1964	Monaco	16	(1)
1965–1970	Ajaccio	106	(15)
- * Club domestic league appearances and goals

Claude Peretti (24 February 1942 – 8 September 2020) was a French footballer who played as a right midfielder. He won the 1963 Coupe de France with Monaco.

== Biography ==
Peretti played his youth years with his hometown team, Nice, which won the championship in 1959. He joined Monaco in 1960, with which he won the Coupe Charles Drago in his first season and led the 1962–63 French Division 1. He then played for Marseille before returning to Monaco for a brief stint in 1964. In 1965, he joined Ajaccio, which won the Ligue 2 championship in 1967. He retired in 1970.

Peretti died on 8 September 2020 at the age of 78.
