= Cape Bruce =

Headland of Antarctica

Coordinates: 67°25′S 60°47′E

Cape Bruce forms the northern tip of a small island lying at the eastern side of Oom Bay, separated from the mainland rocks just west of Taylor Glacier in Mac. Robertson Land, Antarctica.

== Historic site ==
A landing was made at the cape on 18 February 1931 by the British Australian and New Zealand Antarctic Research Expedition under Sir Douglas Mawson. It was named by Mawson for Stanley Bruce (later Lord Bruce), Prime Minister of Australia, 1923–29. A cairn, with a plaque, erected by Mawson at the time to commemorate the landing, has been designated a Historic Site or Monument (HSM 5) following a proposal by Australia to the Antarctic Treaty Consultative Meeting.
