= Ufs Island =

Island in Antarctica

Ufs Island (67°28′S 61°8′E) is a rocky island 3.2 km (2 mi) wide, lying in the east part of Howard Bay, Antarctica, just north of the Lachal Bluffs, and about 4 km (2.5 mi) west of Allison Bay. Cape Simpson, the north end of this island, was discovered by the British Australian New Zealand Antarctic Research Expedition (BANZARE) under Mawson in February 1931, but the feature's insularity was first recognized by Norwegian cartographers working from aerial photographs taken by the Lars Christensen Expedition, 1936–37. They named it Ufsoy (bluff island).

== See also ==
- List of Antarctic and sub-Antarctic islands
