= Bart Carlier =

Dutch footballer (1929–2017)

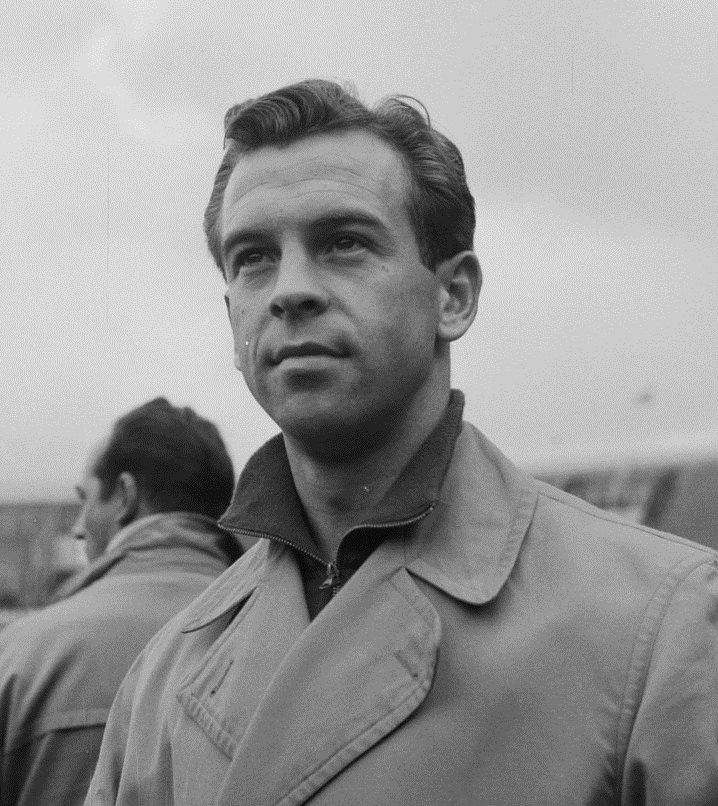
- Carlier in 1955

Personal information
- Full name: Anthonius Hubertus Carlier
- Date of birth: 23 June 1929
- Place of birth: Venlo, Netherlands
- Date of death: 4 May 2017 (aged 87)
- Place of death: Strasbourg, France
- Height: 1.69 m (5 ft 7 in)
- Position: Striker

Senior career*
Years	Team	Apps	(Gls)
–1952	VVV		
1952–1953	1. FC Köln	19	(5)
1953–1954	Pirmasens	18	(8)
1954–1955	Strasbourg	29	(11)
1955–1958	Fortuna '54	93	(40)
1958–1964	Monaco	167	(36)
1964–1965	Fortuna '54	24	(8)

International career
1955–1957	Netherlands	5	(2)
- * Club domestic league appearances and goals

Anthonius Hubertus "Bart" Carlier (23 June 1929 – 4 May 2017) was a Dutch professional footballer who played as a striker. He spent eight seasons in France, winning league championships with AS Monaco in 1961 and 1963. Carlier appeared for the Netherlands national team five times, scoring two goals.

== Club career ==
A left-sided striker, Carlier played the majority of his career in France, starting there at a time professional football was not allowed in Holland. When it was introduced, he returned to Limburg to play for big spending Fortuna '54 alongside star players Cor van der Hart, Bram Appel, and Frans de Munck.

== International career ==
Carlier made his debut for the Netherlands in a November 1955 friendly match against Norway and earned during his career a total of 5 caps, scoring 2 goals. His final international was a November 1957 friendly against Belgium.

== Personal life ==
Carlier lost almost his entire family in 1944, when they were killed during a bombing of Venlo in World War II. Carlier died on 4 May 2017, aged 87.
