= Josef Vacenovský =

Czech footballer (1937–2023)

Personal information
- Date of birth: 9 July 1937
- Place of birth: Ratíškovice, Czechoslovakia
- Date of death: 4 December 2023 (aged 86)
- Place of death: Czech Republic
- Position: Forward

Senior career*
Years	Team	Apps	(Gls)
1957–1969	Dukla Prague	271	(67)
1969–1971	Gent		
1971–1972	Lokeren		

International career
1964	Czechoslovakia	1	(0)
- * Club domestic league appearances and goals

Josef Vacenovský (9 July 1937 – 4 December 2023) was a Czech football forward who played for Czechoslovakia in the 1960 European Nations' Cup. He also played for Dukla Prague.

== Life ==
Vacenovský was born on 9 July 1937 in Ratíškovice. He died on 4 December 2023, at the age of 86.

== Career ==
Vacenovský played for Dukla Prague during the club's golden era and won six league titles. In 1960, he participated with the Czechoslovakia national team in the European Nations' Cup, but did not get into any matches. He made his only start for the national team in a 1964 friendly match against Poland. At the end of his career, he played for Gent and Lokeren in Belgium.
