= Liam Hennessy (footballer) =

Irish footballer (1932–2019)

Personal information
- Full name: William Hennessy
- Date of birth: 1932
- Place of birth: Dublin, Ireland
- Date of death: 21 May 2019 (aged 87)
- Positions: Left half; inside forward

Senior career*
Years	Team	Apps	(Gls)
1949–1961	Shamrock Rovers	163	(39)
1962–1964	Waterford	15	(4)
1964–1967	St Patrick's Athletic	33	(1)

International career
1954–1959	League of Ireland XI	5	(0)
- * Club domestic league appearances and goals

Liam Hennessy (1932 – 21 May 2019) was an Irish international footballer who played as an attacking left half, with a gifted left foot. Nicknamed "The Gunner" such was the power and shooting accuracy he delivered both from open play and from the penalty spot. (Source: Shamrock Rovers archive media)

== Career ==
Lived in Dundrum, Dublin, Ireland, with wife Joan, and was a father of 5 children.

He signed for Shamrock Rovers in 1949 after a season with Wolverhampton Wanderers and became part of the side popularly known as Coad's Colts, enjoying many memorable days during the 1950s. Shamrock Rovers dominated the football scene in the 1950s, and were instrumental in placing Irish Football on the global map

Hennessy made a scoring debut on 23 December 1951 at Limerick scoring the first goal from 40 yards out in a 3–0 win.

When Rovers won the League in 1953/54 Liam scored 4 goals in front of a crowd of 35,000 in a 10–2 win over Cork Athletic.

Played in 4 FAI Cup finals in a row from 1955 losing the latter two. Missed a penalty in the 1958 decider.

Made 3 appearances while at Glenmalure Park in the European Champion Clubs' Cup. Played both legs against OGC Nice. In the away leg at Nice in 1959–60, he was struck down with sunstroke during the game, but soldiered on.

In May 1948 he played for the Republic of Ireland national football team at Griffin Park that won on English soil for the first time. In 1952 he played and scored for the Republic of Ireland national football team amateurs against England.

Earned 5 Inter-League caps while at Milltown between 1954 and 1959. Scored 39 League and 9 FAI Cup goals for the Hoops.

Hennessy played in several European Cup ties, most notably starring against the famous Manchester United "Busby Babes" in 1957, & in the same campaign scored a wonder goal from the halfway line against French champions Nice, in front of a capacity 50,000 crowd in Dalymount Park.

Hennessy was renowned for his " tough, no nonsense style of play, complemented with a natural skill on the ball, and an ability to win the ball and distribute with pinpoint accuracy under pressure." (Shamrock Rovers archives, P Green 1964. 231-56P) Hennessy was also the main penalty taker throughout his tenure at Shamrock Rovers, converting an incredible 29 out of 31 penalties.

Shared a benefit game with Liam Tuohy in May 1960.

Spent part of the 1961/62 season in the US, starring in a competitive tournament held in New York, captaining Shamrock Rovers and scoring against Spanish Champions Espaynol, and Red Star Belgrade. The following year Hennessy returned home to sign for Waterford United F.C.

Was awarded the Shamrock Rovers Hall of Fame in 1990.

In February 2008 Liam, along with Maxie McCann were invited to the Munich commemoration to represent Shamrock Rovers at Manchester United.

== Sources ==
- Paul Doolan; Robert Goggins (1993). The Hoops. Gill & MacMillan. ISBN 0-7171-2121-6.
