= Howard Bay (Antarctica) =

Body of water in Antarctica

Howard Bay (67°28′S 61°4′E) is a 2-mile (3 km) wide body of water in Antarctica, lying between Byrd Head to the west and Ufs Island and the Lachal Bluffs to the east. It was discovered in February 1931 by the British Australian New Zealand Antarctic Research Expedition under Douglas Mawson, and was named by him after A. Howard, the expedition's hydrologist.
