= Ron Heckman =

English footballer

Personal information
- Full name: Ronald Ernest Heckman
- Date of birth: 23 November 1929
- Place of birth: Peckham, London, England
- Date of death: 29 November 1990 (age 61)
- Place of death: Bracknell, England
- Position: Left winger

Senior career*
Years	Team	Apps	(Gls)
- Bromley
1955–1958	Leyton Orient	87	(38)
1958–1960	Millwall	92	(21)
1960–1963	Crystal Palace	84	(25)
1961	→ Montreal Concordia (loan)		
1963–1965	Bedford Town	68	(15)
Total		263	(84)

Managerial career
- 1967–1969: Bedford Town
- * Club domestic league appearances and goals

Ronald Ernest Heckman (23 November 1929 – 29 November 1990) was an English footballer who played as a left winger in the Football League for Leyton Orient, Millwall and Crystal Palace. He later played non-league football for Bedford Town whom he also managed from April 1967 to March 1969.
