= Stanton Group =

Group of islands in Antarctica

The Stanton Group (67°32′S 61°38′E) is a group of small rocky islands close to the coast at the east side of Utstikkar Bay, 4 nautical miles (7 km) northeast of Falla Bluff discovered in February 1931 by the British Australian New Zealand Antarctic Research Expedition (BANZARE) under Mawson. He named it for A. M. Stanton, first officer of the Discovery, 1930–31.
