= International Soccer League =

U.S.-based soccer league (1960–1965)

- Organizer(s): American Soccer League
- Founded: 1960
- Abolished: 1965; 61 years ago
- Region: New York City, U.S.
- Teams: 9 (1965)
- Last champion: (Poland) Polonia Bytom

The International Soccer League was a U.S.-based soccer league which was formed in 1960 and collapsed in 1965. The League, affiliated with the American Soccer League, featured guest teams primarily from Europe and some from South America, Canada and Mexico.

The creation of the League was announced in January 1960, when it was regarded as an attempt to create a Club World Cup, with authorization given by FIFA and ratified by Stanley Rous.

Rous's blessing of the International Soccer League was the second of his 3 attempts, as a FIFA official, to support a "club world cup", preceded by his involvement in the 1951 Copa Rio and followed by his 1967-1970 proposal to expand the Intercontinental Cup into a FIFA-sponsored multicontinental Club World Cup. However, the concurrence of the UEFA/CONMEBOL-endorsed Intercontinental Cup, launched also in 1960, ended up overshadowing the International Soccer League and the relevance it might have had as a club world championship. As both the Intercontinental Cup and the International Soccer League were first played in 1960, by that year it was possibly unclear which one of the two competitions would have its "club world cup" prestige stick among football fans and mass media; as a consequence, the champion club of the 1960 International Soccer League, Brazilian Bangu, has announced it will request FIFA recognition to its title as a Club World Cup.

== History ==
In 1960, William D. Cox, a wealthy U.S. businessman and former owner of the Philadelphia Phillies, a U.S. baseball team, saw a potential market in the United States for top-level soccer. Recognizing that U.S. teams did not play at a sufficiently high level to attract the attention of most fans, he began to consider the possibility of importing European and South American teams during their league off-seasons. Traditionally, tours by European clubs in the northeast United States had drawn well and Cox decided to pursue this approach.

However, soccer in the U.S. was run by the U.S. Soccer Football Association (USSFA). As a member of the soccer's international governing organization, FIFA, the USSFA had the sole power in the U.S. to authorize the creation of a new league, and any league created without USSFA authority would be declared an "outlaw league". Any person playing in an "outlaw league" would then be banned from playing in any other league or team affiliated with FIFA, and as nearly every league and team in the world was affiliated with the world soccer body, this would effectively ban a player from playing soccer anywhere.

To get USSFA approval, Cox worked through the existing American Soccer League, a USSFA-recognized league. This went so far that in 1961, the ASL scheduled only one game during the ISL season in order to keep from drawing fan support from the league. Each year, the ISL played two halves to its season, with different sets of teams; the top team from each half played each other in a season-ending championship game. In order to give the American fans a greater stake in the league, Cox also decided to enter a team of U.S.-based players; this team, called variably New York, the New Yorkers and the New York Americans, was usually a mix of U.S.-based European professionals with some native all-stars. Cox also gained regional television coverage, and the associated revenue stream. While the games were initially played in the New York metropolitan area, as interest in the ISL increased, he expanded the league to Chicago, Detroit, Boston and Los Angeles.

The ISL lasted only through the end of the 1965 season before folding, not so much by its continuing financial losses (some $100,000 over five seasons), but due to the continuing hostility of the USSFA. The ISL's growing success, combined with Cox’ refusal to allow USSFA a part in the league management, led to the USSFA's fear losing control of soccer in the United States. In 1965 the organization forbade Cox from importing teams into the U.S. and threatened to declare the ISL an outlaw league. Cox was forced to fold the ISL, but sued USSFA in federal court for anti-trust violations, a suit he eventually won. While the ISL played its last season in 1965, the model was used again in 1967 when the United Soccer Association (USA) imported foreign teams to populate its league and again in 1969 when the North American Soccer League (NASL) used imported teams for the first half of its season.

In 1967, Cox joined with several other investors to found the National Professional Soccer League, a non-USSFA sanctioned league which, the following year, merged with the US to become the NASL.

== List of champions ==
=== League ===
Teams were divided into two groups (Section I and Section II) where they played a single round-robin tournament. Teams placed first in each group, played a final match to decide a champion.

Note: all the finals were held in New York City

Ed.	Year	Champion	1st. leg	2nd. leg	Agg.	Runner-up	Venue
1	1960	(Brazil) Bangu	2–0	–	2–0	(Scotland) Kilmarnock	Polo Grounds
2	1961	(Czechoslovakia) Dukla Prague	7–2	2–0	9–2	(England) Everton	Polo Grounds
3	1962	(Brazil) America (RJ)	2–1	1–0	3–1	(Portugal) Belenenses	Polo Grounds
4	1963	(England) West Ham United	1–1	1–0	2–1	(Poland) Górnik Zabrze	Polo Grounds
5	1964	(Poland) Zagłębie Sosnowiec	4–0	1–0	5–0	(West Germany) Werder Bremen	Downing Stadium
6	1965	(Poland) Polonia Bytom	3–0	2–1	5–1	(United States) New York Americans	Randall's Island Stadium

=== American Challenge Cup ===
In 1962, the ISL initiated an annual challenge cup. It would pair the winner of the previous year's Challenge Cup winner with the current season's league champion. Dukla Prague had won the 1961 title, defeating Everton F.C. 7–2 and 2–0 in the championship. Therefore, they were paired in the first Challenge Cup with the 1962 season winner, América RJ. Dukla won and returned for the next three challenge cups, winning each, except for the last in which they fell to Polonia Bytom.

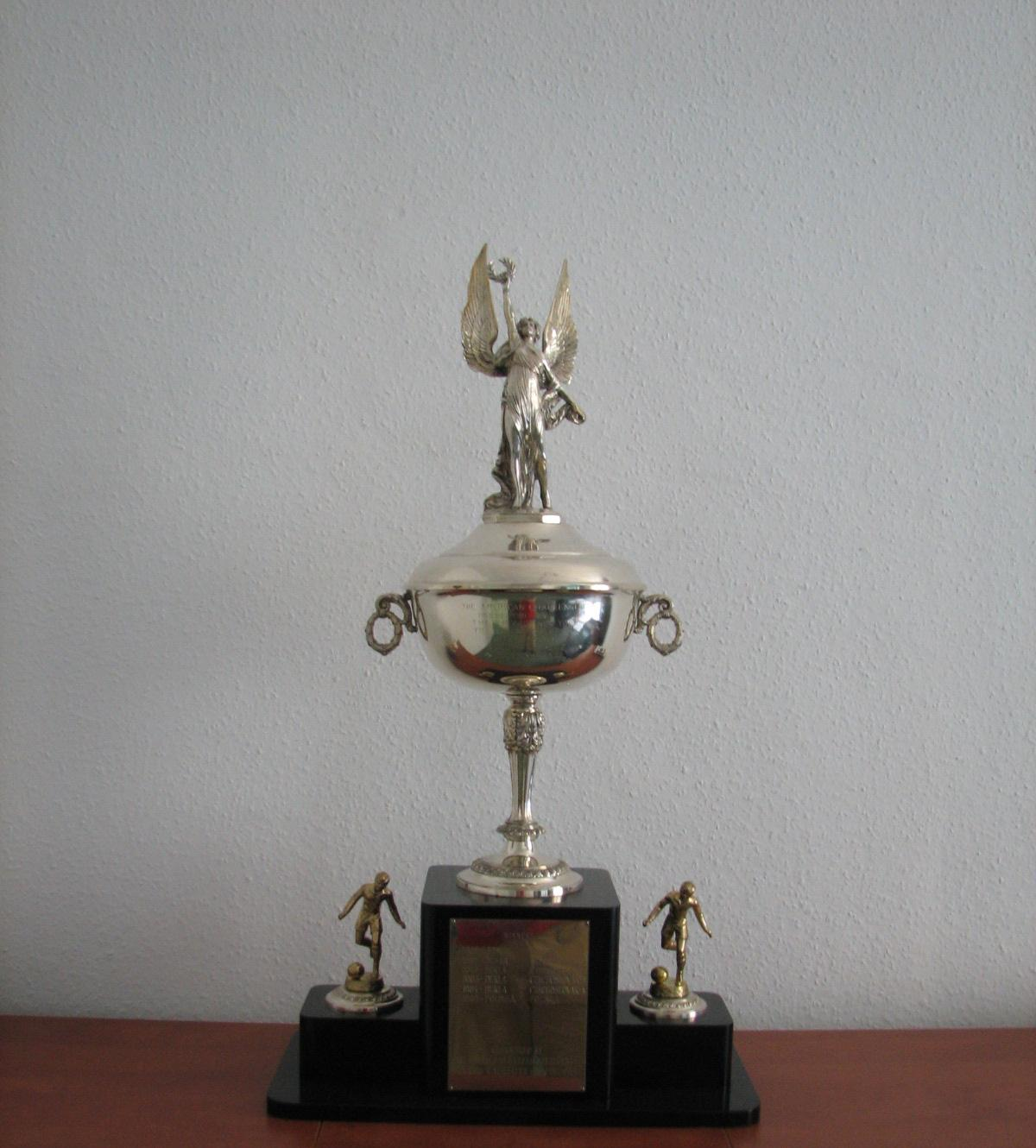
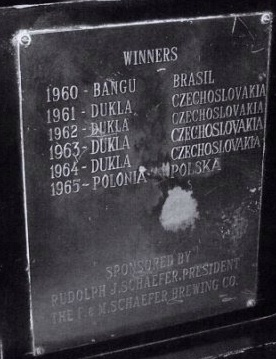
(Left) trophy of the American Challenge Cup; (right): plaque with the list of champions
- Title number, in brackets:

Ed.	Year	Champion	1st. leg	2nd. leg	Agg.	Runner-up
1	1960	(Brazil) Bangu (1)	– (Note: No match held. Trophy directly awarded to champion of International Soccer League.)			
2	1961	(Czechoslovakia) Dukla Prague (1)	–			
3	1962	(Czechoslovakia) Dukla Prague (2)	1–1	2–1	3–2	(Brazil) America (RJ)
4	1963	(Czechoslovakia) Dukla Prague (3)	1–0	1–1	2–1	(England) West Ham United
5	1964	(Czechoslovakia) Dukla Prague (4)	3–1	1–1	4–2	(Poland) Zagłębie Sosnowiec
6	1965	(Poland) Polonia Bytom (1)	2–0	1–1	3–1	(Czechoslovakia) Dukla Prague

== League MVP ==
Beginning in 1961, the league champion was awarded the Dwight D. Eisenhower trophy, but from 1962 to 1965 it was given to the league MVP. However, in 1960 and 1961 the best players in the tournament were Ademir da Guia (Bangu) and Válter Santos (Bangu) respectively.

Year	Player	Team
1960	(Brazil) Ademir da Guia	(Brazil) Bangu
1961	(Brazil) Válter Santos	(Brazil) Bangu
1962	(West Germany) Carl Bogelein	(West Germany) Reutlingen
1963	(England) Bobby Moore	(England) West Ham United
1964	(West Germany) Gerhard Zebrowski	(West Germany) Werder Bremen
1965	(Germany) Uwe Schwart	(United States) New York Americans

== Teams participations ==
Winning years are indicated in bold

Team	Year/s contested
(Greece) AEK Athens	1964
(Brazil) América RJ	**1962**
(Brazil) EC Bahia	1964
(Brazil) Bangu	**1960**, 1961
(West Germany) Bayern Munich	1960
(Portugal) Belenenses	1962, 1963
(Turkey) Beşiktaş	1961
(England) Blackburn Rovers	1964
(England) Burnley	1960
(Mexico) Club Deportivo Oro	1963
(Romania) Dinamo Bucharest	1961
(Socialist Federal Republic of Yugoslavia) Dinamo Zagreb	1963
(Czechoslovakia) Dukla Prague	**1961**, 1962, 1963, 1964, 1965
(Scotland) Dundee	1962
(Sweden) Elfsborg	1962
(Spain) Espanyol	19612
(England) Everton	1961
(Hungary) Ferencváros	1965
(Northern Ireland) Glenavon	1960
(Poland) Górnik Zabrze	1963
(Mexico) Guadalajara	1962
(Socialist Federal Republic of Yugoslavia) Hajduk Split	1962
(Israel) Hapoel Petah Tikva	1961
(Sweden) Helsingborgs IF	1963
(Scotland) Heart of Midlothian	1964
(West Germany) Karlsruhe	1961
(Scotland) Kilmarnock	1960, 1961, 1963, 1965
(Italy) Lanerossi-Vicenza	1964
(Italy) Mantua	1963
(France) Monaco	1961
(Canada) Montreal Concordia	1961
(Hungary) MTK Budapest	1962
(United States) New York Americans	1960, 1961, 1965
(France) Nice	1960
(Sweden) Norrköping	1960
(Italy) Palermo	1962
(Greece) Panathinaikos	1962
(Poland) Polonia Bytom	**1965**
(Brazil) Portuguesa	1965
(West Germany) Preussen Munster	1963
(Austria) Rapid Wien	1960, 1961
(Spain) Real Oviedo	1962
(Spain) Real Valladolid	1963
(Brazil) Sport Recife	1963
(West Germany) Reutlingen	1962
(Socialist Federal Republic of Yugoslavia) Red Star Belgrade	1960, 1961, 1964
(Italy) Sampdoria	1960
(Austria) Schwechat	1964
(Republic of Ireland) Shamrock Rovers	1961
(Portugal) Sporting Lisbon	1960
(West Germany) TSV 1860 Munich	1965
(Hungary) Újpest	1963
(France) Valenciennes	1963
(Italy) Varese	1965
(Portugal) Vitória de Guimarães	1964
(Austria) Wiener AC	1962, 1963
(West Germany) Werder Bremen	1964
(England) West Bromwich Albion	1965
(England) West Ham United	**1963**, 1965
(Poland) Zagłębie Sosnowiec	**1964**
