= Falla Bluff =

Antarctic coastal bluff

In Antarctica, Falla Bluff (67°34′S 61°29′E) is a prominent rocky coastal bluff at the head of Utstikkar Bay. It was discovered in February 1931 by the British Australian New Zealand Antarctic Research Expedition under Mawson and named by him for R.A. Falla, ornithologist with the expedition.
