= Utstikkar Bay =

Bay in Antarctica

Coordinates: 67°33′S 61°28′E

In Antarctica, Utstikkar Bay is a bay 4 miles (6 km) wide, indenting the coast immediately east of Utstikkar Glacier. It was first mapped by Norwegian cartographers from aerial photos taken by the Lars Christensen Expedition, 1936–37, and was so named by them because the bay is contiguous with Utstikkar Glacier.
