= Mawson Coast =

Shoreline in Antarctica

Coordinates: 67°40′S 63°30′E

The Mawson Coast is that portion of the coast of Mac. Robertson Land, Antarctica, lying between William Scoresby Bay, at 59°34′E, and Murray Monolith, at 66°54′E. The coast was sighted during the British Australian New Zealand Antarctic Research Expedition (BANZARE), 1929–30, under Sir Douglas Mawson. Further exploration and landings at Cape Bruce and Scullin Monolith were made during BANZARE, 1930–31. Mawson Coast was named by the Antarctic Names Committee of Australia after Mawson in recognition of his great contribution to Antarctic exploration.

Trethewry Point is a rocky promontory 120 m (390 ft) high, projecting from the coast 4 nmi (7.4 km; 4.6 mi) east of William Scoresby Bay on the Mawson Coast. It was discovered and named in February 1936 by DI personnel on the William Scoresby.
