= List of mountains of Mac. Robertson Land =

The mountains of Mac. Robertson Land are located in the region Mac. Robertson Land, East Antarctica, between 60° E and 73° E. This region is claimed by Australia as part of the Australian Antarctic Territory. The area is highly glaciated. The availability of reliable data for this region is limited, making the list incomplete and inaccurate. The highest peaks, including nunataks and ice domes, are listed below:

Name	Elevation (meters)	Location	Coordinates	GNIS ID	SCAR ID
Mount Menzies	3228	Prince Charles Mountains	73°27′37.7″S 61°53′19.5″E	9863	9441
Mount Bewsher	2527	Aramis Range	70°53′45.4″S 65°25′34.0″E	1339	1291
Mount Kirkby	2438	Porthos Range	70°26′34.5″S 65°11′24.8″E	7988	7561
Mount Mervyn	2286	Porthos Range	70°30′33.5″S 65°18′24.5″E	9891	9471
Mount McKenzie	2255	Prince Charles Mountains	70°40′29.6″S 67°01′56.0″E	9711	9300
Mount Béchervaise	2235	Athos Range	70°11′39.1″S 64°48′11.1″E	1148	1078
Summers Peak	2205		69°42′04.3″S 64°52′20.0″E	14797	14231
Husky Massif	2190	Aramis Range	71°00′S 65°10′E	7206	6796
Mount Starlight	2150	Athos Range	70°12′17.9″S 64°29′58.8″E	14491	13943
Mount Abbs	2135	Aramis Range	70°35′30″S 66°37′22″E	14	10
Cumpston Massif	2070	Prince Charles Mountains	73°36′S 66°48′E	13406	3200
Corry Massif	2065	Porthos Range	70°26′10.0″S 64°37′31.4″E	3190	3014
Riddell Nunataks	2040		69°53′51.0″S 64°21′51.6″E	12625	12127
Anare Nunataks	2036		69°58′S 64°34′E	386	329
Leah Ridge	2016	Athos Range	70°13′06.9″S 64°59′58.1″E	8633	8249
Mount Lacey	2010	Athos Range	70°11′40.9″S 64°42′07.6″E	8338	7985
Marsh Nunatak	2010	Goodspeed Nunataks	73°01′21.3″S 61°25′03.3″E		9038
Mount Stinear	2010	Athos Range	73°04′30.7″S 66°21′44.6″E	14609	14049

== See also ==
- List of mountains of East Antarctica
- Komsomol'skiy Peak
- Neill Peak
- Stump Mountain
