= List of glaciers of Mac. Robertson Land =

Location of Mac. Robertson Land (red), Australian Antarctic Territory in Antarctica.

Following is a list of glaciers of Mac. Robertson Land in Antarctica. This list may not reflect recently named glaciers in Mac. Robertson Land.

- Arriens Glacier
- Battye Glacier
- Brunvoll Glacier
- Charybdis Glacier
- Collins Glacier
- Fisher Glacier
- Forbes Glacier
- Geysen Glacier
- McKinnon Glacier
- Mellor Glacier
- Nemesis Glacier
- Scoble Glacier
- Scylla Glacier
- Strahan Glacier
- Trail Glacier
- Utstikkar Glacier
