= Radok Lake =

Lake in the Aramis Range, Antarctica

- Location within Antarctica
- Location: Mac.Robertson Land, Antarctica
- Coordinates: 70°52′S 68°00′E
- Type: Meltwater lake
- Primary inflows: Battye Glacier and Glossopteris Gully
- Primary outflows: Pagodroma Gorge
- Max. length: ~ 10 km (6.2 mi)
- Max. width: max. 3 km (1.9 mi)
- Surface area: 19.9 km^{2} (7.7 sq mi)
- Max. depth: 367 m (1,204 ft)
- Surface elevation: 7 m (23 ft)

Radok Lake is a meltwater lake in Antarctica, three miles (4.8 km) southwest of Beaver Lake and 15 miles (24 km) southeast of the Aramis Range, Prince Charles Mountains. It is about four miles (6.4 km) long and marked by a slender glacier tongue feeding into it from the west. It was plotted by Australian National Antarctic Research Expeditions (ANARE) from air photos taken by the RAAF Antarctic Flight in 1956. The lake was named for Uwe Radok, Reader (head) of Meteorology Department at the University of Melbourne, who greatly assisted Australian National Antarctic Research Expeditions (ANARE)'s glaciological program.

With a depth of 362 metres (1,188 ft), Radok Lake is the deepest known surface lake on the Antarctic continent (whereas Lake Vostok is the continent's deepest subglacial lake) and the only known freshwater lake to host a floating ice tongue glacier (the Battye Glacier). It is drained by three-mile-long (4.8 km) Pagodroma Gorge in to Beaver Lake. Radok Lake is an isothermal, non-stratified lake (i.e., a homogeneous water body).

Bainmedart Cove (70°51′S 68°3′E) is a cove about 1 nautical mile (2 km) long in eastern Radok Lake. The cove leads to the narrow Pagodroma Gorge. The name is a composite one made from the names of C. Bain, A. Medvecky, and J. Dart who spent a month at the cove studying the geology of the lakes area during the ANARE Prince Charles Mountains survey in January–February, 1969.

Pagodroma Gorge is a steep-sided gorge 3 mi long which joins Radok and Beaver Lakes. Photographed from ANARE aircraft in 1956. The gorge was traveled by A. Medvecky, ANARE geologist in January–February, 1969. Named by ANCA after the snow petrels (Pagodroma nivea) which nest in the weathered sandstone walls of the gorge.

Glossopteris Gully (70°51′S 68°6′E) is a steep-sided, narrow gully on the east side of Bainmedart Cove. It was named by ANCA after the Glossopteris fossil plant found in the upper part of the gully.

Fossil Wood Point (70°50′S 68°2′E) is a point of land between Bainmedart Cove and Radok Lake. It was so named because deposits of fossil wood were found on the point.
