= Cutcliffe =

Cutcliffe is a surname. Notable people with the surname include:

- C. J. Cutcliffe Hyne (1866–1944), English novelist
- David Cutcliffe (born 1954), American college football coach
- Marg Cutcliffe (born 1955), Canadian female curler
- Sinclair Cutcliffe (1930–2007), Canadian politician

== See also ==
- Catcliffe
- Cotcliffe
- Cutcliffe Peak
