= Zebra Peak =

Mountain in Antarctica

Zebra Peak (69°41′S 64°56′E) is a peak 1.5 miles (2.4 km) northeast of Summers Peak in the Stinear Nunataks, Mac. Robertson Land. The feature was visited by D.J. Grainger, geologist with the ANARE (Australian National Antarctic Research Expeditions) Prince Charles Mountains survey party in February 1970. So named by Antarctic Names Committee of Australia (ANCA) because of the irregular bands and lenses of light and dark colored rocks which have the appearance of zebra stripes.
