= 1987 Queen's Birthday Honours (Australia) =

The 1987 Queen's Birthday Honours for Australia were announced on Monday 8 June 1987 by the office of the Governor-General.

The Birthday Honours were appointments by some of the 16 Commonwealth realms of Queen Elizabeth II to various orders and honours to reward and highlight good works by citizens of those countries. The Birthday Honours are awarded as part of the Queen's Official Birthday celebrations during the month of June.

== Order of Australia ==
=== Companion (AC) ===
==== General Division ====
Recipient	Citation	Notes
Sir Ernest Edward Dunlop, CMG OBE	For service to Australian prisoners of war	
The Right Honourable Sir Harry Talbot Gibbs, GCMG KBE	For service to the law and to the Australian honours system	
The Honourable Mr Justice Leonard James King	For service to the South Australian Parliament, Government and to the law	
His Excellency Dr John Davis McCaughey	For service to the Crown, to religion, to learning and to the community	
His Excellency The Honourable Douglas McClelland	For service to the Commonwealth Parliament and Government	
The Honourable Mr Justice Gordon Jacob Samuels	For service to learning, to the community and to the law	
Harry Seidler, OBE	For service to the advancement of architecture in Australia	
Sir William (Joshua) Vines, CMG	For service to industry, to commerce and to government	

=== Officer (AO) ===
==== General Division ====
Recipient	Citation	Notes
David Outram Anderson	For service to the secondary industry and commerce	
Tudor Harvey Barnett	For service to the public service	
Dr Alfred Dunbavin Butcher, CMG	For service to conservation, particularly to the re-development of the Royal Melbourne Zoological Gardens	
Professor Alexander Cambitoglou	For service to archaeology and to international relations	
Ian Castles, OBE	For public service, particularly as Secretary to the Department of Finance and as Australian Statistician	
Dr John Hinton Bassett Christian	For service to science, particularly in the field of microbiology	
Augustus Morris Cornish	For service to the sport of lawn bowls	
Charles Paul Curran	For service to the community and commerce	
Emeritus Professor Arthur Delbridge	For service to education, particularly in the field of linguistics and as editor-in-chief of the Macquarie Dictionary	
Dr Judith Elizabeth Dey	For service to paediatrics, particularly in the field of developmental disabilities	
William Leslie Dix	For service to secondary industry, particularly the automotive industries	
Dr Kevin James Fagan	For service to the welfare of ex-service personnel, to medicine and to the community	
His Excellency Roy Robert Fernandez	For service as a diplomat	
Sir Arthur Thomas George	For service to the community and to education	
Emeritus Professor Louis Goldberg	For service to education, particularly in the field of accounting	
Lydia Karola Ludewine Hebestreit	For service to nursing education	
Dr John Keith Henderson	For service to medicine, particularly in the field of neurosurgery	
Henry Percival Hurrell	For service to the trade union movement	
Roger Kemp, OBE	For service to the arts	
Donald King	For service to mining, particularly coal mining	
Lady Dorothy Wolseley Macarthur-Onslow	For service to the community and to youth	
Thomas Ernest May	For service to industry and to the community	
Alan Gordon McGregor	For service to the arts and to the community	
Charles Rothauser	For service to secondary industry particularly to the design and manufacturing of plastics	
James Harcourt Shepherd	For service to primary industry, particularly to the wool and sheep meat industries	
John Robert Thomas	For public service particularly as chief executive of the Australian Industry Development Corporation	
John Bruce Thomson, ED	For service to the coal mining industry	
Dr Helen Alma Newton Turner, OBE	For service to science, particularly in the field of animal genetics and sheep breeding	
Ronald Joseph Walker, CBE	For service to the community and to social welfare	
Dr Leonard James Webb	For service to conservation, particularly in the field of rainforest ecology	

==== Military Division ====
Branch	Recipient	Citation	Notes
Navy	Rear Admiral Nigel Richard Benbow Berlyn, AM	For service to the Royal Australian Navy as a Marine Engineering Officer, particularly as the General Manager of Her Majesty's Australian Naval Dockyard, Garden Island	
Army	Major General Gordon John Fitzgerald	For service to the Australian Army as Chief of Personnel	
Army	Major General Neville Robert Smethurst, MBE	For service to the Australian Army in the field of operational development	
Air Force	Air Commodore Richard William Bradford	For service to the Royal Australian Air Force as Officer Commanding, RAAF Air Base, Butterworth, Malaysia	

=== Member (AM) ===
==== General Division ====
Recipient	Citation	Notes
Edith Emma Adlard	For service to the community	
Cyril Norman Aynsley	For service to the transport industry	
The Reverend Aubrey Vincent Baker	For service to religion and to the community, particularly in the outback	
John Anthony Bell, OBE	For service to the performing arts as an actor and director	
John Alexander Birch	For service to overseas aid agencies and international relations	
Nancy Wilmot Borlase	For service to art	
The Honourable William Archibald Borthwick	For service to the Victorian Parliament and to the community	
Richard Boyer	For service to the Tariff Board and the Industries Assistance Commission	
Francis Brady	For service to the public service, particularly to the New South Wales Electricity Commission	
Professor Gerald Anthony Broe	For service to medicine, particularly geriatric medicine	
Keith Osborne Brown	For service to secondary industry and education	
Joan Shirley Brown	For service to education	
Donald Ross Burton	For service to the trade union movement	
Alan Winter Chandler	For services to the community	
Dr Richard Ian Charlesworth	For service to the sport of hockey	
Teofila Cohen, OBE	For service to the community and education	
John William Connell	For service to civil engineering and to the community	
Councillor The Honourable Leo Paul Connellan	For service to local government	
Barry Hugh Crocker	For service to the performing arts and to the community	
Vernon John Dalton	For service to youth and community services and as Chairman of the Corrective Services Commission of New South Wales	
Dr Glyn Anthony Davies, ED RFD	For service to the community	
John Antony Barclay Dunlop	For service to the welfare of children	
The Reverend Gilbert William Arthur Duthie	For service to religion, the community and to the Commonwealth Parliament	
Edna Theresa Edgeley	For service to the performing arts	
Thomas James Edmonds, OAM	For service to the performing arts, particularly in the field of opera	
Alan Newbury Edwards, OBE	For service to the community, particularly to the Army Reserve	
Dr Frederica Lucy Erickson	For service to the arts, particularly as an author and illustrator	
Sydney Alan Field	For service to the community, particularly the Jewish community	
William Joseph Fisher	For service to the mining industry	
Desmond Lionel Foster	For service to the media, particularly radio	
Alderman Desmond Allan Freeman	For service to the community and to local government	
Dorothy Elliott Ginn	For service to the welfare of children, particularly through the establishment of the Child Abuse Preventative Service	
John Ernest Dunlop Goldie	For service to medicine particularly in the field of surgery	
Dr Morris Michael Gollow	For service to medicine particularly in the field of venereology	
Mary Elizabeth Grant	For service to health administration and to the community	
David Gulpilil	For service to the arts through the interpretation of Aboriginal culture	
Wilfred John Harris	For service to primary industry, particularly in the field of oenology	
Geoffrey John Henke	For service to sport, particularly through the Australian Olympic Federation	
Khalil Herro	For service to secondary industry, particularly in the field of commerce	
Alma Eleonor Hexter	For service to children with physical and intellectual disabilities	
Ross Ainsworth Hohnen, OBE	For service to the community and to youth	
Dr Robinson Mainwaring Jacklyn	For service to science, particularly in the field of cosmic ray research	
Norton Jackson	For service to the mining industry	
Ralph Jacobi, MP	For service to the Commonwealth Parliament	
Allan Lindsay Jeans	For service to Australian football	
Patrick James Johnson	For service to health and public administration	
Ronald Stephen Jones	For service to surveying	
Reginald Lionel Kermode, MBE	For service to secondary industry, particularly to the transport industry	
The Most Reverend Archbishop Abdo Rachid Khalife	For service to the Maronite Church in Australia	
Reginald Thomas King	For public service as Director of the Queensland office of the Department of Employment and Industrial Relations	
Dr Stanley George Kings	For service to the dental profession	
Henry Maxwell Kitson	For service to the community	
Andrew Peter Knox	For service to the retail industry	
Marie Jeanne Lamp	For service to the nursing profession particularly in the fields of hospital standards and nurse education	
William Charles Langshaw	For service to youth and the community	
David Alexander Lawe Davies	For service to youth and to the community	
Ronald James Letten	For service to secondary industry, particularly in the fields of building and construction	
Walter James Lewis	For service to rugby league football	
Clifton Walter Love	For service to secondary industry and to the community	
Professor Alban Jude Lynch	For service to the mineral processing industry	
Dr Alasdair Mackellar	For service to medicine in the field of paediatric surgery	
Kenneth Mackenzie-Forbes	For service to the arts, particularly opera	
Ronald Dereck Armstrong Maconaghie	For service to the arts, particularly to opera and as a teacher of voice	
Dr David Michael Madew	For service to local government	
Louis Edward Marks	For service to the transport industry	
Dr Gerard Joseph McCafferty	For service to medicine, particularly in the field of otolaryngology	
Kenneth Hugh McLeod	For service to industrial relations	
Noreen Patricia Minogue	For service to international relations as Deputy Secretary General of the Australian Red Cross Society	
Godfrey William Moessinger	For service to hockey	
Alan Leslie Morse, OBE	For service to local government	
Francis Xavier Murphy	For public service	
Roy Alfred Newton	For service to the community	
Gregory John Norman	For service to golf	
Dr June Norma Olley (Cumbrae-Stewart)	For service to science, particularly to food science	
Dr Reginald Roland Roessler Pascoe	For service to veterinary science	
John Keith Petrie	For public service and for service to the community	
Frederick Kenneth Lionel Phillips	For service to unemployed youth as the founder of the Bridging the Gap scheme	
The Reverend Lloyd Gladstone Phillips	For service to the Marriage Guidance Council movement	
Mervyn John Phillips	For service to banking	
Barbara Jean Pitt	For service to the National Council of Women	
William James Reedman	For service to education	
Dr John George Hamilton Refshauge, OBE	For service to sports medicine	
John Douglas Richards	For service to local government and underprivileged groups	
Paul Henry Riomfalvy	For service to the film industry and to the performing arts	
The Right Reverend Stanley Bruce Rosier	For service to religion and to the Anglican diocese of Willochra, South Australia	
Thomas Hendry Russell	For service to road engineering and construction	
Philip Andrew Satchell	For service to radio broadcasting	
Barbara Madge Schaefer	For service to the Women's Agricultural Bureau	
Michael Zdenek Schulz	For service to the community, particularly through the Ethnic Affairs Commission of South Australia	
Herbert George Seymour	For service to the welfare of ex-service men and women	
Dr Anthony Greville Shannon	For service to education, particularly in the field of applied mathematics	
The Reverend Canon Charles Henry Sherlock	For service to religion, particularly as Anglican minister to the parish of Hunters Hill, New South Wales	
William James Shields	For service to public health	
Thomas John Smith, MBE	For service to medicine	
Anthony John Stanfield	For service to welfare, particularly to those afflicted by drug and alcohol abuse	
George Rathjen Starritt, OBE	For service to primary industry and to the horticultural show movement	
Kevin Peter Stevens, ISO	For public service	
Dr David Maxwell Storey	For service to medicine and to health administration	
Elizabeth Mary Stubbs	For service to pre-school education	
William John Stutt, DFC	For service to thoroughbred horse racing	
Alderman Sheila Burns Swain	For service to local government and to women's groups	
Joyce Belle Thurgood	For service to the community, particularly through the Association of Civilian Widows	
John Garfield Tilley	For service to local government	
Lyn Kreutzer Turner	For service to forensic science	
Victor Vaclav Vodicka	For service to the craft of gold and silver smithing	
Reverend Brother Robert John Wallace	For service to education	
Dr Ronald Harry Cecil Wells	For service to medicine and to health administration	
The Honourable Arthur Mornington Whyte	For service to the Parliament of South Australia	
Eric Gordon Willetts	For service to primary industry, particularly maize growing	
William John Agnew Wills	For service to commerce	
Professor Stephen Adolphe Wurm	For service to education particularly in the field of linguistics	
John William Cardwell Wyett	For service to the health insurance industry	

==== Military Division ====
Branch	Recipient	Citation	Notes
Navy	Commander James Gerald Bridges Armstrong, MBE	For service to the Royal Australian Navy as Deputy Director of Naval Intelligence	
Navy	Commander Peter Derek Johnstone-Hall	For service to the Royal Australian Navy as the Command Support Services Officer to the Flag Officer, Naval Support Command	
Navy	Lieutenant Commander Edward Ernest Powell	For service to the Royal Australian Navy as Office in Charge, Fleet Intermediate Maintenance Activity onboard HMAS Stalwart	
Navy	Captain Robert Andrew Kevin Walls	For service to the Royal Australian Navy as the Director of Naval Force Development	
Army	Lieutenant Colonel Gary Robert Bell	For service to the Australian Army in the field of communication equipment	
Army	Lieutenant Colonel Peter James Dunn	For services to the Australian Army as Commanding Officer, 1st Field Regiment, Royal Regiment of Australian Artillery	
Army	Colonel John Curtis Hartley	For service to the Australian Army as Commandant, Army Apprentices School and Commander, Albury/Wodonga Military Area	
Army	Major Leslie John Hiddins	For service to the Australian Army in the field of combat survival	
Army	Major Bradley Keating	For service to the Army Reserve in New South Wales	
Army	Major Kevin Konemann	For service to the Australian Army in the field of personnel management	
Army	Colonel Cyril Brian McAuley, MBE ED	For service to the Australian Army in the field of transport and movement	
Air Force	Wing Commander Donald Bruce Chandler	For services to the Royal Australian Air Force as Temporary Commanding Officer of No 482 Maintenance Squadron	
Air Force	Squadron Leader James Eric Males	For service to the Royal Australian Air Force as Staff Officer, Air Traffic Control Projects, Air Force Office	
Air Force	Wing Commander Phillip Leslie Morrall	For service to the Royal Australian Air Force as a Staff Officer with the Directorate General of Personnel Services, Air Force Office	
Air Force	Squadron Leader Brian Winston Overall	For service to the Royal Australian Air Force as Office responsible for Engineering Management of the Operational Mirage Fleet	
Air Force	Wing Commander Brian Anthony Robinson	For service to the Royal Australian Air Force, particularly through his contribution to the Hornet Aircraft Project	
Air Force	Group Captain Bruce David Searle	For service to the Royal Australian Air Force as Manager of the Tactical Fighter Project Sub-Office in Washington	

=== Medal (OAM) ===
==== General Division ====
Recipient	Citation	Notes
Elizabeth Margaret Allan	For services to the public service	
William Charles Modwen Appleby	For service to the community	
Wallace Thomas Kennedy Baird	For service to the media	
Alexander Leslie Baker	For service to the welfare of ex-service men and women	
Alan Edgar Barlow	For service to athletics	
Reginald Barlow	For service to athletics	
William Maxwell Bartlett	For service to the Public Service, particularly to the Australian Bureau of Statistics	
Herbert Thomas Bates	For service to the community as Divisional Officer of the St John Ambulance Brigade	
Edward David Batrouney	For service to the community and local government	
Arthur Henry Beetson	For service to the sport of Rugby League	
David Ian Bell	For service to hockey	
Douglas Alan Bishop	For service to primary industry, particularly to the Australian Apple and Pear Corporation	
Robert James Black	For service to the sport of baseball	
Ian Bruce Blair	For service to local government	
Rae Flora Blesing	For service to multicultural adult education	
Efrem Bonacina	For service to the Italian community	
Frederick Thomas Borchardt	For service to education, particularly as an administrator	
Kira Abricossova Bousloff	For service to ballet	
William Harry Boylan	For service to primary industry, particularly tea planting	
Ernest Charles Percy Bradley	For service to the Queensland Ambulance Service	
Alan James Branson	For service to the community, particularly to the rural fire brigade	
Walter Howard Dent Brattan	For service to social welfare	
Netta Patricia Burns	For service to the Public Service	
John Desmond Button	For service to the community	
Clarence William Byrne	For service to the community	
The Reverend James Henry Cain, OBE	For service to religion and community welfare	
John Harold Campbell	For service to the Victorian Parliament	
Sydney James Campbell	For service to the community through the Australian Honours system	
Frederick Bernard Cavanagh	For services to local government	
Margaret Argyle Clements	For service to the welfare of Aboriginal children and their families	
Eileen May Coker	For service to the community	
Arthur Roy Coker	For service to the community	
Royce Collier	For service to the community, particularly to urban fire brigades	
Retta Grace Collins	For service to the Christian Women Communicating International	
Thomas Patrick Collins	For service to the community and local government	
Francis Cormac Cox	For service to community welfare	
The Reverend Thomas Howard Crago	For service to religion	
William Eric Crane	For service to the community	
Elizabeth Catherine Crawford	For service to the community	
Mary Cremin	For service to scientific research as a librarian	
Rex Lawrence Cross	For service to the community	
Alan Cunningham	For service to the sport of rowing	
Helen Bohumila Daff	For service as an educational therapist	
Marjorie Ruth Dale	For service to the welfare of people with intellectual disabilities	
Ellen May Davidge	For service to the community	
George Russell Davidson	For service to the community	
Frances Barbara Dawson	For service to local government and to the community	
Councillor Dorothy Kathleen Dean	For service to the community, particularly to youth	
Norman Arthur Clayton Dean	For service to the community	
Gordon Nivens Dick	For service to the performing arts	
Mary Clouston Dive	For service to the sport of women's hockey and women's cricket	
Leo Owen Donovan	For service to hospital administration	
Stanley Lawrence Doust	For service to the sport of Rugby League football	
Dr Patricia Dawn Downie	For service to the Blind Sports Association of Australia	
Esma Lila Dries	For service to the sport of lawn bowls	
Desmond William Dumbrell	For service to the community and to local government	
Frank George Dunn	For service to the community, particularly to the Country Fire Service	
John Edward Dunphy	For service to the community and to local government	
Jane Durbin	For service to improving cancer treatment facilities	
Dorothy Mary Durkin	For service to the welfare of ex-service men and women	
Eleanor Catherine Eade	For service to music and as a teacher of voice	
Alec Samuel Edwards	For service to the community and local government	
Colleen Ann Egan	For service to community welfare	
Nancy Grace Everingham	For service to the welfare of children with physical disabilities, particularly through the Riding for the Disabled Association	
Alderman John Francis Ford	For service to the community and to local government	
Helga Maria Theresia Forster	For service to the welfare of the aged	
William Henry Gallie	For service to the sport of swimming	
Helen Elizabeth George	For service to conservation	
Maxwell Raymond Gray	For service to the community	
Dr Geoffrey John Hall	For service to medicine, particularly cancer detection in women	
Jennifer Helen Broughton Hammond	For service to music	
Betty Marion Hauptmann	For service to the visually impaired, particularly children	
Edna Elizabeth Haynes	For service to the community, particularly as a librarian	
Charles Raymond Hepworth	For service to harness racing	
Raymond William Hills	For service to the community	
George Clavering Holman	For service to education, particularly promoting literature for children	
Annie Christina Hovey	For service to adult literacy	
Shirley Jean Hughson	For service to nursing	
Agnes Betty Jeffrey	For service to the welfare of nurses in Victoria and ex-service men and women	
Florence Elizabeth Johnson	For service to aviation	
Dulcie Zena Johnston	For service to the welfare of people with physical or intellectual disabilities	
James Padman Kelly	For service to the community, particularly the South Australian Jubilee 150 celebrations	
Robert Kerr	For service to community welfare, as a teacher of first aid	
Kristine Kay Klugman	For service to education and to the social welfare of the community	
Ante Kovac	For service to soccer	
Gwendoline May Langford-Smith	For service to the welfare of Aboriginal children	
John Michael Lines	For public service	
Minnie Ethel Littlewood	For service to community welfare	
Mientje Adriana Anthonius Septimus Maas	For service to the community	
Janet Winifred Mansfield	For service to the arts, particularly in the fields of ceramics and pottery	
Domingo Martinez	For service to the community	
Esmae Lilias Marwick	For service to the community	
Donald Gordon Mason	For service to local government	
Victoria Margaret McCormack	For service to Aboriginal welfare and to the community	
Steuart Pender McIntyre	For service to local government and to the community	
Shirley Elizabeth McKechnie	For service to dance, particularly as a teacher	
Albert Harold Hepburn McShane	For service to the community, particularly the elderly	
Hubert Henry Maudsley Miller	For service to conservation and the environment	
Peter Sydney Moore	For service to rugby league football	
Margaret Moraitis	For service to the Ethnic Communities Council and the Greek community	
Donald William Morgan	For service to those with impaired hearing	
Margaret Hamilton Muirhead	For service to the YWCA of Darwin and to the community	
Patrick Joseph Mullane	For service to the community	
Butcher Joe Nangan	For service to the arts and to Aboriginal heritage as a painter, shell carver, keeper of legends and songwriter	
Lily May Nesbitt	For service to the community	
Walter George O'Hara	For service to cricket	
John Joseph O'Toole, MBE	For service to sport administration	
Dr Geoffrey Gordon Olsen	For service to medicine and health administration	
Allan Lincoln Opie	For service to the community	
Richard Palmer	For service to the forestry industry	
Grace Gibson Parr	For service to the performing arts, particularly through radio productions	
Victor Patrick	For service to boxing	
Henry David Patton	For service to the community	
Herbert William Petras	For service to primary industry, particularly to the Australian Barley Board	
Ada Elizabeth Catherine Piper	For service to the community	
Felix Prattico	For service to the Italian community	
James Lyall Priestly	For service to horticulture, particularly to rose growing	
Werner Hellmuth Colze Rares	For service to the arts, particularly the collection and preservation of costumes, decorate arts and textiles	
Alderman Ronald William Rathbone	For service to local government	
John William Rattley	For service to local government	
The Reverend Canon Bruce Herbert Reddrop	For service to marriage guidance and family counselling	
Gladys Mildred Reeves	For service to people with physical disabilities	
Thomas Carl Ridgeway	For service to the Victorian Teachers' Union Credit Union	
Dr Michael Gerrans Ridpath	For service to the Commonwealth Scientific and Industrial Research Organisation and to education	
Irene Robson	For service to the establishment of community health centres and to the support of sufferers of cancer	
James Alexander Rochford	For service to the community	
Ian Paul Rohde	For service to local government	
William Harold Rowan-Robinson	For service to the community	
Gerard Edward Ryan	For service to the community	
John William Ryley	For service to primary industry, particularly in the field of livestock health and production	
Joseph Sarib	For public service in the Northern Territory	
Roy Alvine Scrivener	For service to the welfare of Naval ex-service men	
William Henry Seymour	For service to the community, particularly the Albany Sea Rescue Squad	
John Frederick Shaw	For service to primary education and to the community	
Mervyn Albert Short, ED	For service to the North Queensland Regional Committee for Employer Support of Reserve Forces and to Rotary	
Athina Constance Sideris	For service to the community, particularly the ethnic community	
Councillor Kevin Mackay Skinner	For service to local government	
Thomas James Smith	For service to boxing	
Ernest Joseph Smith	For service to the community, particularly in the care of others at the Matthew Talbot Hostel	
Lloyd Maxwell Stapleton	For service to local government and the community	
Jeane Yvonne Stuart	For service to the community	
Gary Myles Stutsel	For service to swimming	
Max Joseph Syer	For service to local government	
Olive Mary Tattersall	For service to the community, particularly the United Hospital Auxiliaries of New South Wales	
John Grahame Temple	For service to the disabled, particularly the Disabled Person Activity Centre	
Ronald George Till	For service to the community	
Armando Tornari	For service to the Italian community	
Henri Edouard Touzeau	For service to music, particularly as a teacher of the cello	
Albert Victor Wade	For service to the trade union movement	
George Albert Warnecke	For service to local government and to the community	
Keith Alexander Watson	For public service	
Cecil Andrew Webster	For service to the community	
Iriss Linda Whiteman	For service to the community, particularly the Bathurst District Hospital Auxiliary	
John Thomas Wilton	For service to the Victorian Vocational Rehabilitation Association	
James Wessing Wishart	For service to rifle shooting	
Margaret Lorna Wright	For service to the development of music performances for schools in New South Wales	

==== Military Division ====
Branch	Recipient	Citation	Notes
Navy	Petty Officer Anthony John James Emmett	For service to the Royal Australian Navy as the Maintenance Co-ordinator for 723 Squadron Squirrel helicopters at HMAS Albatross	
Navy	Warrant Officer William Peter Franklin	For service to the Royal Australian Navy in the field of Naval communications	
Navy	Petty Officer Wayne Paul Hanson	For service in the Naval Stores Sub-department of HMAS Sydney	
Navy	Warrant Officer Ian Maxwell Neville	For service to the Royal Australian Navy as Food Services Officer at HMAS Nirimba	
Navy	Warrant Officer Barry George Spencer	For service to the Royal Australian Navy, particularly as the Regulating Officer at HMAS Penguin	
Army	Warrant Officer Class One Cyril Terrence Ainslie	For service to the Australian Army Administration	
Army	Warrant Officer Class One Phillip Thomas Douglas	For service to the Australian Army in the field of Army welfare	
Army	Warrant Officer Class One Beverley Margaret Dunstall	For service to the Australian Army in the field of administration	
Army	Staff Sergeant Lester Brian Ehrlich	For service to the Australian Army in the field of Construction Supervisor, 22nd Construction Squadron	
Army	Warrant Officer Class One Gary Wayne Hanson	For service to the Australian Army as Regimental Sergeant Major 3rd Brigade	
Army	Warrant Officer Class Two Gordon Leslie Hewett	For service to the Australian Army as Training Officer, Pilbara regiment	
Army	Sergeant Robert Dinnin James	For service to the Australian Army in the field of Communications	
Army	Warrant Officer Class Two Kyle James Kerr	For service to the Army Reserve in the field of Marine Engineering	
Army	Warrant Officer Class Two Roger John Locke	For service to the Australian Army in the field of Army Reserve Recruiting	
Army	Staff Sergeant Barry John Lutwyche	For service to the Australian Army in the field of Survey Mapping	
Army	Staff Sergeant John Alexander McGregor	For service to the Australian Army Band Corps	
Army	Warrant Officer Class Two John Joseph Sherington	For service to the Army Reserve in Queensland	
Army	Warrant Officer Class Two Reginald Wallace Wildermuth	For service to the Australian Army in Equipment Recovery training	
Army	Warrant Officer Class One Terrance Hamilton Wilson	For service to the Australian Army as Battery Sergeant Major, 131st Divisional Locating Battery	
Air Force	Warrant Officer Trevor James Andrews	For service as housing officer at Royal Australian Air Force base, Fairbairn	
Air Force	Warrant Officer Malcolm Newland Bradbrook	For service to the Royal Australian Air Force in the field of communications	
Air Force	Warrant Officer Robert Joseph Kirk	For service to the Royal Australian Air Force in the administration of foreign military sales	
Air Force	Corporal Allan Raymond Mader	For service to the Royal Australian Air Force as a supplier at No 4 RAAF Hospital Butterworth Malaysia	
Air Force	Flight Sergeant Richard Laurence O'Dea	For service to the Royal Australian Air Force as Non-Commissioned Officer-in-Charge of Aircraft Maintenance at No 35 Squadron	
Air Force	Warrant Officer Raymond Herbert Townsend	For service to the Royal Australian Air Force as a Warrant Officer Engineer at No 3 Aircraft Depot	
Air Force	Warrant Officer Garry Gordon Watt	For service to the Royal Australian Air Force as an Instrument Fitter at No 5 Squadron	
