= Trail Glacier =

Glacier in Antarctica

- Location within Antarctica
- Type: broken mountain glacier
- Location: Mac. Robertson Land
- Coordinates: 73°34′S 61°35′E
- Length: 5 nmi (9 km; 6 mi)
- Width: 3 nmi (6 km; 3 mi)
- Thickness: unknown
- Status: unknown

Trail Glacier (73°34′S 61°35′E) is a broken mountain glacier on the southern side of Mount Menzies, about 2 nautical miles (3.7 km) from the summit. It is about 5 nautical miles (9 km) long and 3 nautical miles (6 km) wide. The glacier flows from a snowfield at about 2,750 m down a steep slope for at least 900 m vertically, then spreads out and merges with the ice sheet a few mi from the south side of the mountain. Mapped from ANARE (Australian National Antarctic Research Expeditions) air photos and surveys of the Prince Charles Mountains, 1960–61. Named by Antarctic Names Committee of Australia (ANCA) for D.S. Trail, geologist who led an ANARE field party to this feature in December 1961.

== See also ==
- List of glaciers in the Antarctic
- Glaciology
