= Berlyn =

Berlyn can refer to:

- Ivan Berlyn (1867-1934), British stage and film actor
- Michael Berlyn (b. 1949), American video game designer and writer
- Nigel Berlyn (1934–2022), Australian naval officer
- Berlyn (Ukraine), a village in Ukraine
- a character of the wrestler Alex Wright
