= Bluster =

Bluster may refer to:

- Bluster Kong, a character in Donkey Kong Country

== See also ==
- Blustery Cliffs
