= Jones Escarpment =

Location in Antarctica

Coordinates: 70°0′S 64°21′E

Location of Jones Escarpment Mac. Robertson Land, Antarctica

Jones Escarpment is a curving escarpment, extending for 10 nautical miles (19 km) in a southerly direction from the Riddell Nunataks and facing eastward, located 12 nautical miles (22 km) north-northwest of Mount Starlight in Mac. Robertson Land. It was mapped from Australian National Antarctic Research Expeditions surveys and air photos, 1955–65, and was named by the Antarctic Names Committee of Australia for W.K. Jones, a geophysicist at Wilkes Station in 1960.
