= Douglas Leckie =

RAAF Pilot (born 1920)

- Born: 30 June 1920; Sandringham, Victoria
- Died: 21 November 2007 (aged 87); Mornington, Victoria
- Military career
- Allegiance: Australia
- Branch: Royal Australian Air Force
- Service years: 1940–1945; 1951–1959
- Rank: Squadron Leader
- Commands: Antarctic Flight RAAF
- Conflicts: Second World War
- Awards: Officer of the Order of the British Empire; Air Force Cross; Polar Medal; King's Commendation for Valuable Service in the Air

Douglas Walter Leckie, OBE, AFC (30 June 1920 – 21 November 2007) was an officer in the Royal Australian Air Force who served as Commanding Officer Antarctic Flight RAAF, which assisted the Australian National Antarctic Research Expedition (ANARE) in 1954, 1956 and 1959.

== Early life ==
Leckie was born in Sandringham, Victoria, the eldest of two children to Captain Peter Martin Leckie and Marie Morris James. Leckie attended Ivanhoe Grammar School from 1928 to 1031, and then Melbourne Grammar School from 1931 to 1936. Leckie learned to fly on float planes at the Royal Singapore Flying Club in Singapore. In 1937 he was training as a cadet in the Straits Settlements Volunteer Air Force, before joining the Royal Australian Air Force (RAAF) in 1940, in the Instructors Training Squadron at Point Cook.

Leckie married Dorothy Iva Hornsby, the daughter of paint manufacturer Gilbert Erle Hornsby and Mildred Marion Ah Yee. Together they had three children.

== RAAF career ==
Leckie served during the Second World War as a Flying Instructor and Flight Commander at No. 2 Elementary Flying School at Archerfield, Brisbane. Serving at various bases throughout Australia and New Guinea, he undertook spotting and surveillance sorties, and later ran safe mail hand, and search and rescue operations, mainly flying Wirraway and Boomerang aircraft. During the early post-war years, he was instructing at Flying School in Yarram, South Gippsland, and started some of the first flying training of the Latrobe Valley Aero Club. In 1951, Leckie re-joined the RAAF, and was posted to RAAF East Sale and Point Cook as a Flying Instructor and Flight Commander.

In 1953 Leckie was appointed Officer in Command of the first post-war Antarctic Flight below the Antarctic Circle. The RAAF assisted the Australian National Antarctic Research Expedition (ANARE) to set up permanent Australian Antarctic stations to support scientific research and exploratory work, and to establish the Mawson base in 1954. Later that year he was appointed Officer in Command of the RAAF Antarctic Flight, leaving Australia in December 1955 and remaining at Mawson for the winter of 1956, returning in March 1957. This was the first time the RAAF had operated an aircraft the entire year below the Antarctic Circle, flying the De Havilland Beaver, using tractor headlights as a flare path during the dark winter months. His leadership and aviation work in Antarctica, commanding the RAAF Antarctic Flights for expeditions from Mawson Station, Leckie was appointed an Officer of the Order of the British Empire.

Leckie Range is a group of peaks 50 miles south of Edward VIII Bay, Enderby Land, Antarctica. The individual peaks were first shown on a 1947 Norwegian whalers chart by H.E. Hansen. The range was named by Australian Antarctic Names and Medals Committee Leckie, who piloted the Auster aircraft from which Phillip Law sighted and plotted these peaks. Mount Leckie (70°26′S 66°0′E) is a roughly circular outcrop about 3 nautical miles (6 km) east of Martin Massif. It was visited by the ANARE southern party, and was named for Leckie.

Leckie returned to the RAAF in 1958 to form a third Antarctic Flight to Wilkes Land. He returned to Australia and resumed his flying duties as Senior Pilot with the Snowy Mountains Authority. In 1959 he discharged from the RAAF.

== Post-military career ==
Living in the Gippsland in 1960, Leckie started Leckie Aviation Services with the Tiger Moth VH-ABC. From 1962 to 1967, he was agricultural flying in Cootamundra. When he returned to Victoria, Leckie was a flying instructor at Moorabbin Airport. He went south again to the Antarctic in 1971 and 1972 with ANARE, flying the Pilatus Porter.

After his career in aviation, Leckie worked for the Herald and Weekly Times and Independent newspapers. Leckie lived in Mornington for 30 years. At his funeral service, he was honoured with a Scottish piper and a tribute flyover by the Latrobe Valley Aero Club.

== Honours and awards ==
- January 1946 – King's Commendation for Valuable Service in the Air
- January 1955 – Air Force Cross (AFC) for acts of valour, courage and devotion to duty for his role with the ANARE in the Antarctic.
- January 1958 – Officer of the Order of the British Empire (OBE) (Military Division). Part of that citation reads; "In his leadership of the RAAF Antarctic Flight and his untiring work as a pilot, Squadron Leader Leckie showed great initiative, courage and determination in the face of extreme hardship and difficulties. His abilities contributed greatly to the successful completion by the Expedition of a most valuable and extensive year's work."
- 1958 – Oswald Watt Gold Medal for "the most brilliant performance in the air or the most notable contribution to aviation, by an Australian, or in Australia"
- July 1961 – Polar Medal for distinguished service in the Antarctic.
