= Arthur George =

Australian football executive (1915–2013)

Sir Arthur George AO
- Born: Athanasios Theodore Tzortzatos; 17 January 1915; Sydney, New South Wales, Australia
- Died: 4 September 2013 (aged 98)
- Education: Sydney Boys High School
- Occupation: Lawyer
- Years active: 1938–1980
- Spouse: Renee Freeleagus (married 1939)

Sir Arthur Thomas George AO, born Athanasios Theodore Tzortzatos (17 January 1915 – 4 September 2013), was an Australian lawyer and association football administrator.

== Personal life ==
George was born in Sydney, Australia to parents of Greek ancestry and was schooled at Kensington Public School. He later attended Sydney Boys High School from 1928 to 1937 before taking the Solicitors Admission Board test and being admitted as a solicitor in 1938.

=== Allegations of criminality ===
Arthur George featured in a long-suppressed report titled "Allegation No. 27", which was tendered to a 1986 federal parliamentary commission of inquiry into allegations regarding the suspected corrupt awarding of the lease on the Sydney Luna Park site by the then NSW government to a company known to have been controlled by notorious Sydney underworld figure Abe Saffron. The report identified George as a friend and business associate of Saffron and named George as one of the witnesses who would need to be interviewed for further investigation of the allegation.

== Soccer ==
George was President of the Australian Soccer Federation between 1969 and 1988, and President of the Oceania Football Confederation from 1978 to 1982.

He was part of the FIFA Executive Committee between 1980 and 1994.

== Selected honours ==
George was knighted in the 1972 Birthday Honours for services to the Australian-Greek community, universities and sport. He was appointed an Officer of the Order of Australia in the 1987 Birthday Honours in recognition of service to the community and to education. In 1994, FIFA awarded him the gold Order of Merit—the organisation's highest honour. He was awarded the Centenary Medal in 2001 for service to Australian society through law, education and sport.
