= P.J. Moonie =

Patrick John Moonie was awarded the Polar Medal in 1975 for his work with the Australian National Antarctic Research Expeditions (ANARE) as Radio Operator-in-Charge at Mawson Station in the 1960s.

== Biography ==
P.J Moonie was born in New South Wales, Australia on the 28 July 1936 to Alice McKay and Oliver Allan Moonie, OAM, and died on the 10 February 2016 in the Australian Capital Territory.

Upon leaving high school, Patrick joined the Royal Australian Navy in the communications branch. He served for 12 years and is decorated with multiple medals. He left the Navy to join the Australian National Antarctic Research Expedition (ANARE) where he completed five expeditions to the Antarctica. On these expeditions, he was the radio operator and Husky dog handler, and participated in scientific and survey field trips.

== Legacy ==
Mount Moonie in the Athos Range was named after P.J. Moonie by the Antarctic Names Committee of Australia.
