= Mount Macey =

Geographical feature in Antarctica

Mount Macey (69°52′S 65°18′E) is an isolated peak 1,960 metres (6,430 ft) high, about 15 nautical miles (28 km) southeast of the Stinear Nunataks in Mac. Robertson Land, Antarctica. It was sighted in 1954 by an Australian National Antarctic Research Expeditions party led by R.G. Dovers, and named for L.E. Macey, technical superintendent at Mawson Station in 1954.
