= John O'Toole (rugby league) =

Australian rugby league coach

John O'Toole OAM MBE
Personal information
- Full name: John Joseph O'Toole
- Born: 12 August 1922 Wyong, NSW, Australia
- Died: 21 November 2010 (aged 88)

Coaching information
Club
Years	Team	Gms	W	D	L	W%
1958–60	Balmain	59	29	1	29	49

John Joseph O'Toole (12 August 1922 – 21 November 2010) was an Australian rugby league administrator and coach of the Balmain Tigers.

Born in Wyong, O'Toole spent his playing career with the Bathurst Railway Club.

O'Toole was first-grade coach of Balmain from 1958 to 1960. He guided the club to a preliminary final in his first season and led them to the finals again his final year, before being replaced by ex-player Harry Bath. A long-time administrator, O'Toole served in various roles throughout his career, including national team manager and NSW Rugby League vice president. He was awarded an OAM in the 1987 Queen's Birthday honours list.
