= Peak Seven =

Mountain in Antarctica

Peak Seven (69°41′S 64°42′E) is a peak 5 nautical miles (9 km) west-northwest of Summers Peak in the Stinear Nunataks in Mac. Robertson Land. Discovered by an ANARE (Australian National Antarctic Research Expeditions) southern party (1954) led by R.G. Dovers. It was the farthest south reached by them. The name was given as a code name in the field and has since been used by later parties.
