= Mount Macklin =

Mount in Antarctica

Mount Macklin (69°57′S 64°36′E) is a mainly snow-covered ridge with an exposed summit at 2,005 metres (6,580 ft) just east of Mount Shaw in the Anare Nunataks of Mac. Robertson Land, Antarctica. It was first visited in November 1955 by an Australian National Antarctic Research Expeditions party led by J.M. Béchervaise, and was named by the Antarctic Names Committee of Australia for Eric Macklin, a radio operator at Mawson Station in 1955.
