= Nemesis Glacier =

Glacier in Mac. Robertson Land, Antarctica

- Location within Antarctica
- Location: Mac. Robertson Land
- Coordinates: 70°32′S 67°30′E
- Thickness: unknown
- Terminus: Aramis Range
- Status: unknown

Nemesis Glacier (70°32′S 67°30′E) is a large glacier which flows northeast through the center of the Aramis Range, Prince Charles Mountains. Discovered in January 1957 by ANARE (Australian National Antarctic Research Expeditions) southern party under W.G. Bewsher, and named after Homer's Nemesis because considerable difficulty was experienced in traversing the region due to the glacier.

== See also ==
- List of glaciers in the Antarctic
- Glaciology
