= Komsomol'skiy Peak =

Peak in Antarctica

Komsomol'skiy Peak (75°45′S 63°25′E) is a partly snow-covered peak rising above the ice plateau located about 130 nautical miles (240 km) south-southeast of Mount Menzies, Mac. Robertson Land, Antarctica. It was discovered by the crew of a Soviet aircraft on December 7, 1958, during a flight from the Southern pole of inaccessibility to Mirnyy Station, and was photographed by an Australian National Antarctic Research Expedition in December 1960. The peak was named by the Soviet expedition after Komsomol, the Soviet Young Communist League.
