= Riddell Nunataks =

Rock ridge group in Antarctica

Riddell Nunataks (69°54′S 64°20′E) is a group of low exposed rock ridges, with snow and ice nearly extending to the summits, lying 5 miles northwest of Anare Nunataks in Mac. Robertson Land. Extending for 10 nautical miles (19 km) in a southerly direction from the ridges is a curving escarpment, the Jones Escarpment.

They were discovered by an ANARE (Australian National Antarctic Research Expeditions) party led by R.G. Dovers in 1954, and named for Alfred Riddell, carpenter at Mawson Station in 1955.
