= Fisher Glacier =

Glacier in Antarctica

- Location within Antarctica
- Coordinates: 73°15′S 66°00′E
- Terminus: Lambert Glacier

Fisher Glacier (73°15′S 66°00′E) is a glacier in Mac. Robertson Land, Antarctica. It is a major tributary of the Lambert Glacier. The glacier is unusual in periodically surging.

== Name ==
The Fisher Glacier was sighted from Australian National Antarctic Research Expeditions (ANARE) aircraft by K.B. Mather in 1957. It was named by the Antarctic Names Committee of Australia (ANCA) for N.H. Fisher, chief geologist, Bureau of Mineral Resources, Dept. of National Development, Australia.

== Location ==
The Fisher Glacier is a prominent western tributary to the Lambert Glacier. It is about 100 nautical miles (190 km; 120 mi) long. It flows east past the north sides of Mount Menzies and Mount Rubin and joins the main stream of the Lambert Glacier just east of Mount Stinear. The combined Lambert-Fisher Glacier is said to be 400 kilometres (250 mi) long, up to 100 kilometres (62 mi) wide, and drains about 8 percent of the Antarctic Ice Sheet. This would make it the largest glacier in the world. However, a study released in 2002 showed that the grounding line of the Lambert, Mellor and Fisher glacier system is up 240 kilometres (150 mi) closer to the South Pole than had been previously thought. The lower part of this system is more properly considered part of the Amery Ice Shelf, and the Fisher glacier as a tributary of this ice shelf. Still, the combined Lambert, Mellor and Fisher glaciers have a total grounded area of more than 97,000 square kilometres (37,000 sq mi).

== Surging ==
There are well-preserved old moraines along the Fisher Glacier and the lower Lambert Glacier. These show that at least three times in the past the ice level had risen by 150 to 200 metres (490 to 660 ft) above its present level. These fluctuations do not appear in the upper regions of nearby glaciers that also drain central Antarctica, but do appear in their lower parts. It seems that they were caused by repeated surges of the Fisher Glacier.

== Tributaries ==
=== Geysen Glacier ===
73°31′S 64°36′E. A large tributary to the Fisher Glacier, flowing northeast between Mount Bayliss and Mount Ruker in the Prince Charles Mountains. Plotted from air photos taken by ANARE in 1956 and 1957. Named by ANCA for H. Geysen, officer in charge of Mawson Station, 1960.

== Other features ==
=== Goodspeed Nunataks ===
73°00′S 61°10′E. A group of three rows of nunataks, oriented approximately east–west and 10 to 15 nautical miles (19 to 28 km; 12 to 17 mi) long, located at the west end of Fisher Glacier, about 30 nautical miles (56 km; 35 mi) west-north-west of Mount McCauley, in the Prince Charles Mountains. Sighted by an ANARE seismic party led by K.B. Mather in January 1958. Named by ANCA after M.J. Goodspeed, geophysicist at Mawson Station in 1957.

=== Seavers Nunataks ===
73°10′S 61°58′E. Two nunataks 16 nautical miles (30 km; 18 mi) west of Mount Scherger, near the head of Fisher Glacier in the Prince Charles Mountains, Mac. Robertson Land. Mapped from ANARE air photos and surveys, 1958 and 1960–61. Named by ANCA for J.A. Seavers, assistant cook at Mawson Station, a member of the ANARE field party in this area in 1961.

== Sources ==
- Alberts, Fred G., ed. (1995), Geographic Names of the Antarctic (PDF) (2 ed.), United States Board on Geographic Names This article incorporates public domain material from websites or documents of the United States Board on Geographic Names.
- "Glaciers Introduction & Facts", Mountains Magazine Lebanon, February 15, 2021
- Wellman, Peter (1982), "Surging of Fisher Glacier, Eastern Antarctice, Evidence from Geomorphology" (PDF), Journal of Glaciology, 28 (98): 23–28, doi:10.3189/S0022143000011758
- Wen, Jiahong; Jezek, Kenneth C.; Fricker, Helen A.; Csathó, Beata M.; Ute C. Herzfeld; Katy L. Farness; Philippe Huybrechts (2007), "Mass budgets of the Lambert, Mellor and Fisher glaciers and basal fluxes beneath their flowbands on Amery Ice Shelf" (PDF), Sci China Ser D, 50 (11): 1693–1706, Bibcode:2007ScChD..50.1693W, doi:10.1007/s11430-007-0120-y
- This article incorporates public domain material from websites or documents of the United States Geological Survey.
