= William Allen McLaren =

Canadian engineer (born 1938)

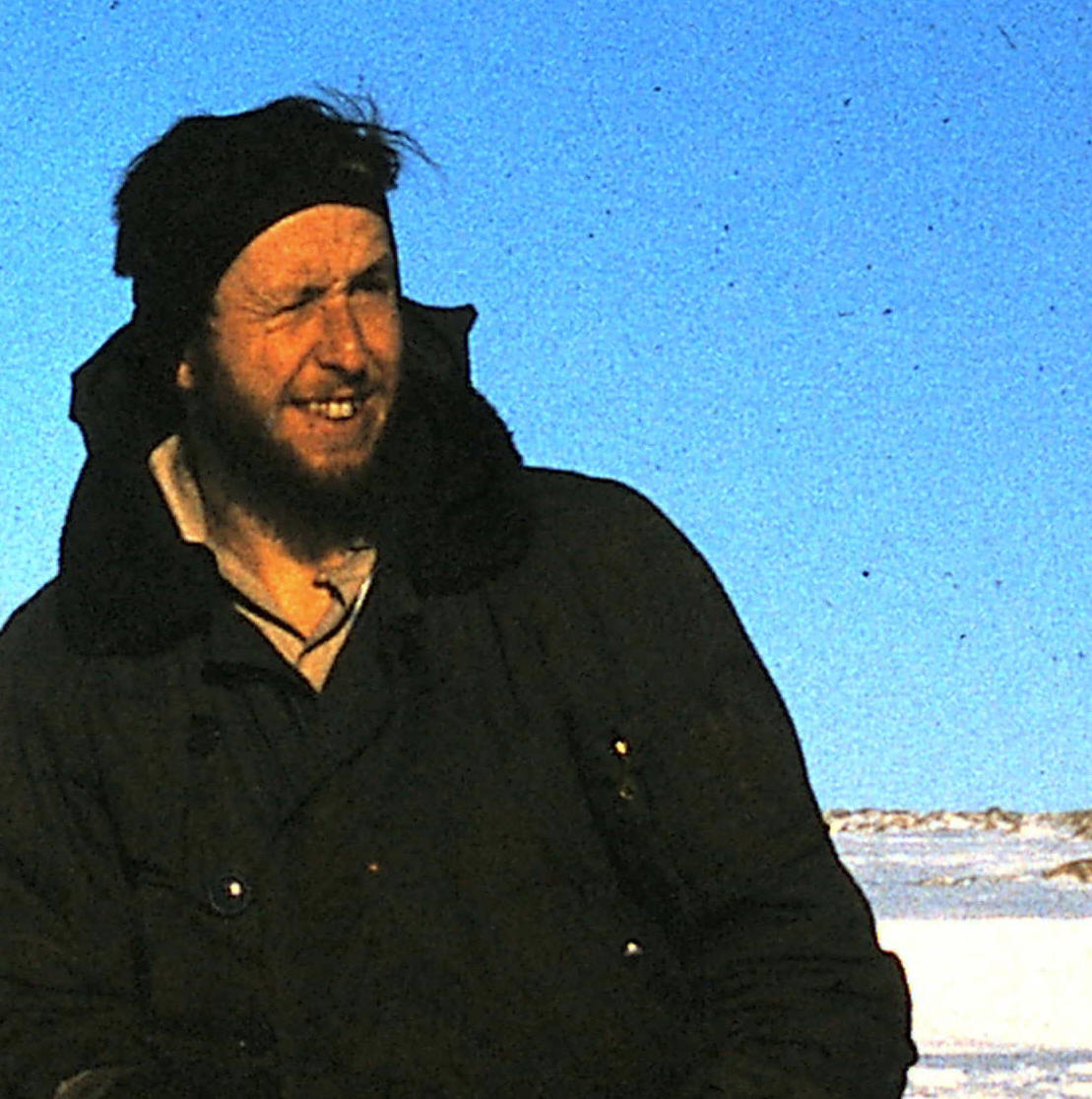
W. Allen McLaren at Wilkes Station, Antarctica, 1965

William Allen McLaren (born 1938) is a retired Canadian engineer living (as of 2023) in southeastern British Columbia. Born and raised in Saint-Lambert, Quebec, McLaren graduated in 1960 from McGill University in Montreal, Quebec, with a Bachelor of Civil Engineering degree.

McLaren's early career involved hydrographic surveys in the Canadian arctic and the Persian Gulf before he joined the Australian National Antarctic Research Expeditions in 1964 as a glaciologist based in Wilkes Station in Antarctica. McLaren Ridge in Antarctica is named after him. As a result of his Antarctic researches, McLaren received a Master of Science degree from the University of Melbourne in 1968 and the Polar Medal in 1969.

McLaren was Senior Engineer and later President of Western Canada Hydraulic Laboratories, Port Coquitlam, British Columbia, from 1975 to 1991. His publications and presentations include:

- Evaluation and Testing of Pumps and Separators for Arctic Oilspill Cleanup Technology
- Testing of A.P.I. Separator under Simulated Sea Conditions
- Wave Forces on a Seawater Intake Structure
- Fluorometric Sand Tracing
- Simulation of Landslide-generated Waves
- Sand Movement Study on Fraser River Foreshore
- Modelling of Flow through a Mine Waste Dump
- Effect of Varying Design Parameters for Caisson Floating Breakwaters
