= Neill Peak =

Mountain in Antarctica

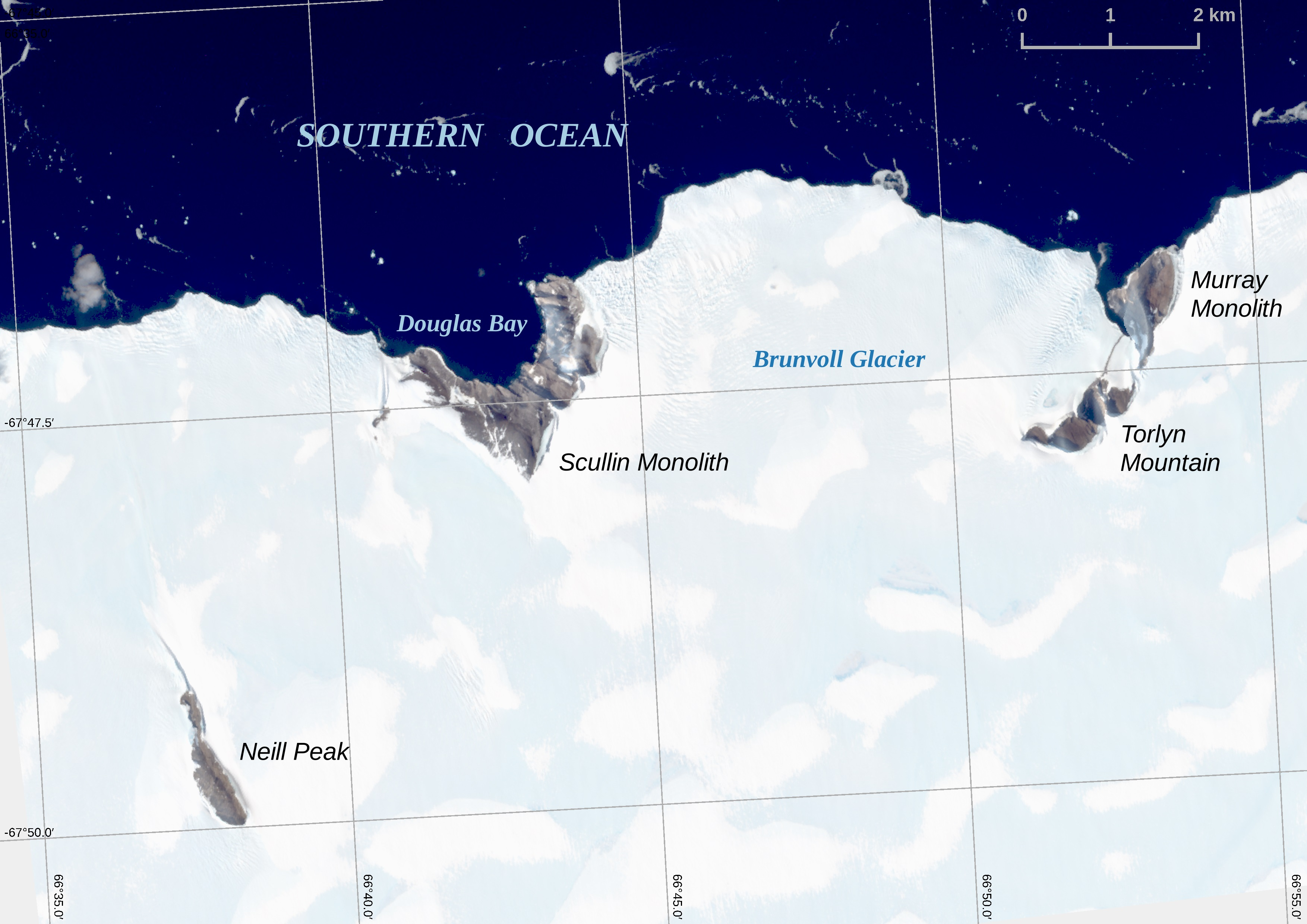
Neill Peak (lower left).

Neill Peak (67°50′S 66°37′E) is a mountain, 460 m, standing 3 nautical miles (6 km) southwest of Scullin Monolith in Mac. Robertson Land. Discovered on 13 February 1931 by British Australian New Zealand Antarctic Research Expedition (BANZARE) under Mawson, who presumably applied the name.
