= Aramis Range =

Mountain range in Antarctica

- Location within Antarctica

Highest point
- Peak: Mount Abbs
- Elevation: 2,135 m (7,005 ft)

Geography
- Parent range: Prince Charles Mountains

On the continent of Antarctica, the Aramis Range is the third range south in the Prince Charles Mountains, situated 11 miles southeast of the Porthos Range and extending for about 30 miles in a southwest–northeast direction. It was first visited in January 1957 by Australian National Antarctic Research Expeditions (ANARE) southern party led by W.G. Bewsher, who named it for a character in Alexandre Dumas' novel The Three Musketeers, the most popular book read on the southern journey.

== Features ==
=== Amery Peaks ===
The Amery Peaks (70°36′S 67°25′E) are a group of peaks which extend for about 18 nautical miles (33 km) along the southeast side of Nemesis Glacier. They were discovered by the ANARE southern party of 1956–57 and so named because of their proximity to the Amery Ice Shelf.

- Mount Loewe (70°32′S 67°43′E) is the most northerly of the Amery Peaks, rising to 1,130 metres (3,700 ft) 6 nautical miles (11 km) northeast of Mount Seaton. It was named for Fritz Loewe, a member of the ANARE reconnaissance party in the Wyatt Earp, 1947–48, and the Australian observer with the French Expedition on the Adélie Coast, 1951–52. It and the Medvecky Peaks arise from the Loewe Massif.
- Mount McKenzie (70°40′S 67°1′E) is a pyramidal peak, 2,255 metres (7,400 ft) high, situated 3.5 nautical miles (6 km) southeast of Saxton Ridge. It was named for John A. McKenzie, a cook at Mawson Station in 1956.
- Mount Seaton (70°36′S 67°27′E) is a prominent domed peak situated about 3 nautical miles (6 km) south of Sandilands Nunatak. It was named for Pilot Officer John Seaton, a RAAF pilot with the Antarctic Flight at Mawson Station in 1956.
- Ritchie Point (70°25′S 68°20′E) is a well defined point at the extremity of the large, flat rock feature extending northeastward from Amery Peaks. It was named for F.A. Ritchie, cook at Mawson Station in 1965.

=== Other mountains ===
- The Medvecky Peaks (70°34′S 67°38′E) are a group of peaks rising from the northwest part of Loewe Massif, in the eastern part of the Aramis Range. They were plotted from ANARE air photographs, and were named by ANCA for A. Medvecky, a geologist with the ANARE Prince Charles Mountains survey in 1969.
- Mount Abbs (70°35′S 66°38′E) is, at 7,005 feet (2,135 m), the most prominent peak in the central part of Aramis Range, situated just west of Thomson Massif. Discovered by the ANARE southern party led by W.G. Bewsher in December 1956. Named by ANCA after Gordon Abbs, radio operator at Mawson Station in 1956.
- Mount Bewsher (70°54′S 65°28′E) is a prominent flat-topped mountain about 6 nautical miles (11 km) east of Mount McMahon. First visited by the ANARE southern party (1956–57) led by W.G. Bewsher, officer in charge at Mawson Station in 1956, for whom it is named.
- Mount Butterworth (70°42′S 66°45′E) is a mountain consisting of four peaks and a long, low ridge extending in an east–west direction, situated 5 nautical miles (9 km) south of Thomson Massif. It was plotted from ANARE air photos taken in 1956 and 1960, and named by ANCA for G. Butterworth, a radio officer at Wilkes Station in 1963 and at Mawson Station in 1966.
- Mount Dowie (70°42′S 66°0′E) is a ridgelike mountain which rises to a central crest, about 4 nautical miles (7 km) west of Mount Hollingshead in the Aramis Range. It was sighted by the ANARE southern party led by W.G. Bewsher in January 1957, and named for Dr. Donald A. Dowie, medical officer at Mawson Station in 1956.
- Mount Grimsley (70°36′S 66°32′E) is a small mountain 1 nautical mile (2 km) southwest of Mount Abbs. It was plotted from ANARE air photos taken in 1956 and 1960, and was named by ANCA for S.W. Grimsley, technical officer (ionosphere) at Wilkes Station in 1963.
- Mount Hollingshead (70°41′S 66°10′E) is a large peak about 3 nautical miles (6 km) east of Mount Dowie. It was visited in January 1957 by the ANARE southern party led by W.G. Bewsher, and named for John A. Hollingshead, a radio supervisor at Mawson Station in 1956.
- Mount Johansen (70°30′S 67°13′E) is a summit rising to 1,555 metres (5,100 ft) in the south-central part of White Massif. It was first visited by the ANARE southern party December 1956, and was named by ANCA for Sergeant G. Johansen, Royal Australian Air Force, an airframe fitter at Mawson Station in 1956.
- Mount Kizaki (70°45′S 65°46′E) is a mountain 4 nautical miles (7 km) southwest of Mount Dowie in the Aramis Range. It was plotted from ANARE air photos, and was named by ANCA after Koshiro Kizaki, a glaciologist at Mawson Station in 1966, and later Professor of Geology, Ryukyu University, Okinawa.
- Mount McGrath (70°53′S 65°28′E) is a mountain 1 nautical mile (2 km) northeast of Mount Bewsher. It was plotted from ANARE air photos, and was named by ANCA for A.E. McGrath, assistant diesel mechanic at Mawson Station in 1963.
- Mount McMahon (70°52′S 65°9′E) is a mountain about 5 nautical miles (9 km) west of Mount Bewsher. It was plotted from ANARE air photos, and was named for R. McMahon, officer in charge at Mawson Station in 1963.
- Mount Ormay (70°44′S 66°42′E) is a ridgelike mountain 1 nautical mile (1.9 km) south of Mount Butterworth. Plotted from ANARE air photos taken in 1956 and 1960. Named by ANCA for P.I. Ormay, plumber at Wilkes Station in 1963.
- Mount Sundberg (70°34′S 66°48′E) is a pyramidal peak surmounting the central part of Thomson Massif. First visited in December 1956 by the ANARE southern party led by W.G. Bewsher. Named by ANCA for Sgt. G. Sundberg, engine fitter with the RAAF Antarctic Flight at Mawson Station in 1956.

=== Nunataks ===
- The Baseline Nunataks (70°46′S 67°1′E) are a small group of nunataks rising above the plateau ice 5 nautical miles (9 km) south of Mount McKenzie. They were visited in January 1957 by the ANARE southern party of 1956–57. This was the eastern end of a photo baseline, with Mount Hollingshead as the western end, hence the name.
- Davern Nunatak (70°54′S 65°20′E) is a nunatak 1.5 nautical miles (3 km) west of Mount Bewsher. It was plotted from ANARE air photos, and named by ANCA for E.V. Davern, a radio operator at Wilkes Station in 1963, and senior weather observer (radio) there in 1967.
- Edwards Nunatak (70°46′S 65°42′E) is a nunatak with two small rock outliers, lying 2 nautical miles (4 km) southwest of Mount Kizaki. It was plotted from ANARE air photos, and was named by ANCA for D.R. Edwards, a radio technician at Mawson Station in 1969, who took part in the Prince Charles Mountains Survey in 1969.
- The Hall Nunataks (70°48′S 66°45′E) are a group of four nunataks about 6 nautical miles (11 km) east-southeast of Mount Bunt. They were plotted from ANARE air photos taken in 1960, and were named by ANCA for R.G. Hall, an assistant diesel mechanic at Wilkes Station in 1964.
- Hudson Nunatak (70°54′S 65°17′E) is a nunatak 2.5 nautical miles (5 km) west of Mount Bewsher. It was plotted from ANARE air photos, and named by ANCA for Dr. J.W. Hudson, a medical officer at Mawson Station in 1966.
- Kilfoyle Nunataks (70°43′S 65°51′E) are two nunataks lying 1.5 nautical miles (3 km) southwest of Mount Dowie. They were plotted from ANARE air photos, and were named by ANCA for B. Kilfoyle, a physicist at Mawson Station in 1966.
- Sandilands Nunatak (70°32′S 67°27′E) is a small, solitary nunatak about 3 nautical miles (6 km) north of Mount Seaton. It lies in the middle of and near the northern end of Nemesis Glacier. Sighted in December 1956 by an ANARE sledging party led by P.W. Crohn. Named by ANCA for A.H. Sandilands, radio operator at Mawson Station in 1957.
- Sullivan Nunataks (70°52′S 65°33′E) are three nunataks lying about 2 nautical miles (3.7 km) northeast of Mount Bewsher. Plotted from ANARE air photos. Named by ANCA for R.N. Sullivan, radio operator at Wilkes Station in 1968, who died on a field trip on July 22, 1968.

=== Glaciers ===
- Battye Glacier (70°52′11″S 67°45′33″E) is a glacier flowing east into Radok Lake in the Aramis Range. It was plotted from ANARE air photos taken in 1956 and 1960, and named by ANCA for A.C. Battye, glaciologist at Wilkes Station in 1962.
- Charybdis Glacier (70°25′S 67°30′E) is a large glacier which drains northeast between the Porthos Range and the Aramis Range. It was discovered by an ANARE southern party led by W.G. Bewsher in December 1956 and named after whirlpool monster Charybdis because of the considerable difficulty experienced in traversing this region due to the glacier.
- The McKinnon Glacier (70°38′S 67°45′E) is a glacier flowing southeast from Nemesis Glacier to Beaver Lake in the eastern part of the Aramis Range. The area was first visited by an ANARE party in 1956 and mapped from ANARE air photographs. The glacier was named by ANCA for Graeme W. McKinnon, Geographical Officer with the Antarctic Division, Melbourne, and Officer in Charge of the ANARE Prince Charles Mountains survey party in 1969.
- Nemesis Glacier (70°32′S 67°30′E) is a large glacier which flows northeast through the center of the Aramis Range. Discovered in January 1957 by ANARE southern party under W.G. Bewsher, and named after Homer's Nemesis because considerable difficulty was experienced in traversing the region due to the glacier.

=== Other features ===
- Beaver Lake is a lake of smooth ice, 11.3 km (7.0 mi) long and 8 km (5.0 mi) wide, enclosed on the south and east by Flagstone Bench and Jetty Peninsula. The lake is situated at the south end of an area of rough ice (a stagnant glacier), 17 mi ESE of the Aramis Range. Discovered by ANARE personnel in 1956. An ANARE camp was established in the vicinity in September 1957 and the lake was used extensively as a landing area by Beaver aircraft. Beaver Lake is an epishelf lake. The outflow water, that makes the lake; is dammed by an ice shelf. Elevation: 0 m (0 ft). Total area: ~ 130 km^{2} (50 sq mi). Maximum depth, of fresh water: 220 m (720 ft), to 260 m (850 ft). Maximum depth, down to bedrock or seabed: 435 m (1,427 ft).
- Dart Moraine (70°54′S 68°0′E) is an area of brown moraine, extending for 7 nautical miles (13 km) south of Radok Lake and Pagodroma Gorge and west of Flagstone Bench, at the eastern end of the Aramis Range. It was photographed by ANARE in 1956. This moraine was crossed many times in January–February 1969 by J. Dart, radio officer with the ANARE party camped at Radok Lake on his way to the aircraft landing strip used to supply the camp.
- Else Platform (70°22′S 66°48′E) is an elevated, flat-topped mass of rock at the north end of Jetty Peninsula. The feature was the site of a survey station occupied by M.N. Rubeli, a surveyor with the ANARE Prince Charles Mountains survey in 1969. It was named after H. Else, a helicopter pilot with the survey.
- Flagstone Bench (70°51′S 68°12′E) is a large rock bench which is littered with flaggy slabs of sandstone, bordering the southeast sides of Radok Lake and Beaver Lake. It was visited by ANARE survey parties in 1957 and 1958; the descriptive name was applied by ANCA.
- Francey Hill (70°43′S 67°2′E) is a low, snow-covered rock feature about 3 nautical miles (6 km) south of Mount McKenzie. It was plotted from ANARE air photos taken in 1960, and was named by ANCA for R.J. Francey, a cosmic ray physicist at Mawson Station in 1964.
- Grainger Valley (70°45′S 67°52′E) is a valley 12 nautical miles (22 km) long and up to 1 nautical mile (2 km) wide separating Manning Massif and McLeod Massif. It was photographed from ANARE aircraft in 1956, and was first crossed on foot on 1 February 1969 by geologist David John Grainger and surveyor Jeff Fox during the ANARE Prince Charles Mountains survey. It was later named by ANCA for Grainger.
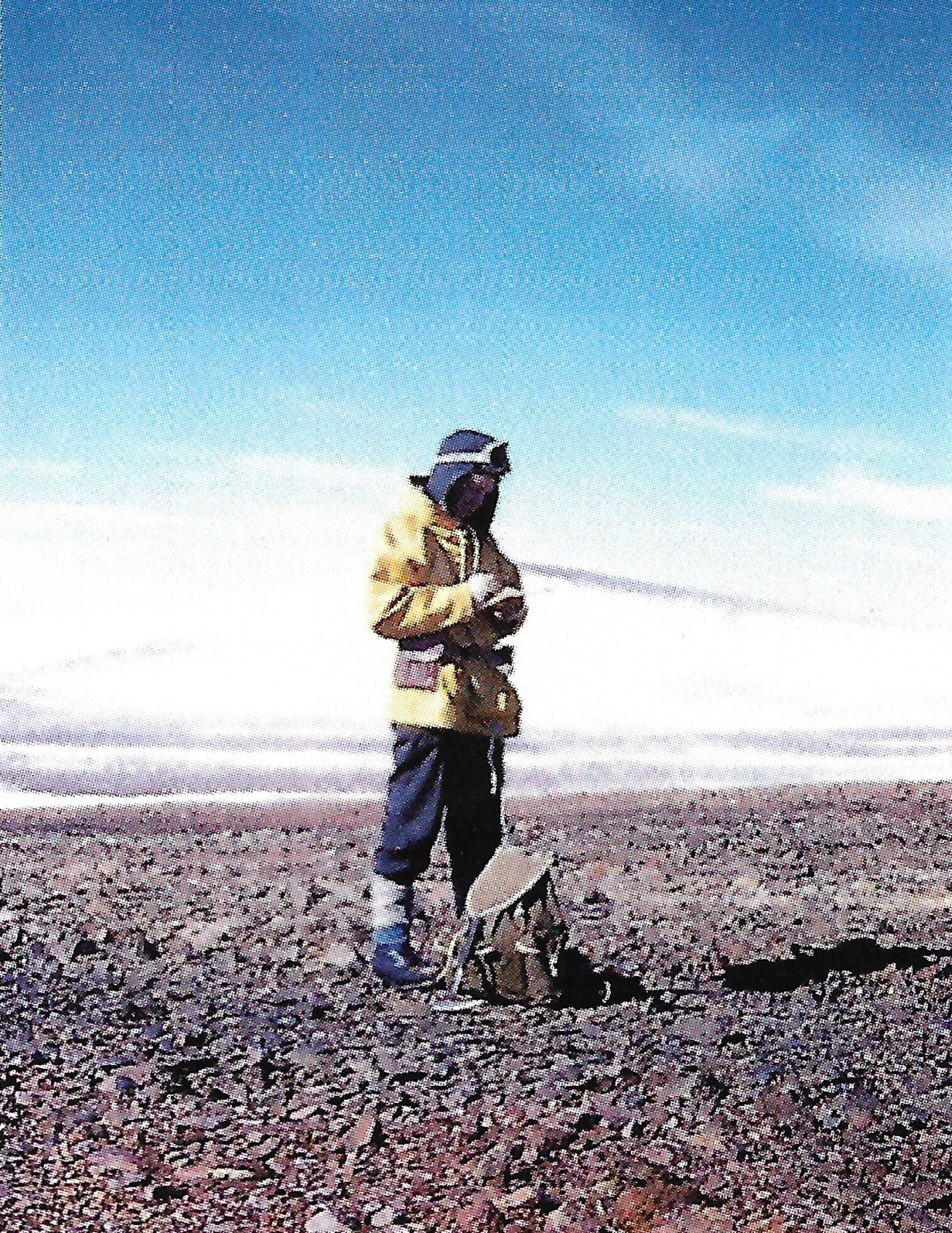
  David Grainger on the Glacial Moraine at the edge of Grainger Valley
- Harvey Ridge is a ridge, elongated in a north–south direction, lying 2 nautical miles (4 km) east of Husky Massif in the Aramis Range. It was plotted from ANARE air photos, and was named by ANCA for S.T. Harvey, a senior technician (electronics) at Wilkes Station in 1965.
- Husky Massif (71°0′S 65°9′E) is a rock outcrop 2,100 metres (6,900 ft) high, about 2.5 nautical miles (5 km) long, standing 6.5 nautical miles (12 km) southwest of Mount Bewsher. It was first sighted from Mount Bewsher by an ANARE field party in January 1957 and named "Husky Dome" to commemorate the sledge dogs used by the party. The earlier name was amended to Husky Massif by ANARE in 1970 and is considered more descriptive.
- Jetty Peninsula is an elongated, steep-sided, almost flat-topped peninsula that extends northward from just east of Beaver Lake for about 30 miles into the Amery Ice Shelf. After an ANARE aircraft discovered it in 1956, ANCA named the formation for its resemblance to a jetty.
- Loewe Massif (70°34′S 68°0′E) is a large rock massif in the eastern part of the Aramis Range. The surface of the massif is largely an undulating plateau from which Mount Loewe and the Medvecky Peaks rise. The plateau lies at an average elevation of 1,000 metres (3,300 ft) above sea level and 600 metres (2,000 ft) above the ice on its northern flank. It was discovered by the ANARE southern party in1956. The name of the massif derives from Mount Loewe.
- Manning Massif (70°42′S 67°50′E) is a large rock massif between Loewe Massif and McLeod Massif in the eastern part of the Aramis Range. It was plotted from air photographs, and was first visited by a party from the ANARE Prince Charles Mountains survey in 1969. The massif was named by ANCA for J. Manning, a surveyor at Mawson Station in 1967, and surveyor-in-charge of field survey operations during the ANARE Prince Charles Mountains surveys of 1969, 1971 and 1972.
- McLaren Ridge (70°52′S 67°38′E) is a rock ridge at the head of Battye Glacier, about 5 nautical miles (9 km) west of Radok Lake. It was plotted from ANARE air photos taken in 1956 and 1960, and was named by ANCA for William Allen McLaren, a glaciologist at Wilkes Station in 1965.
- McLean Ridge (70°44′S 66°51′E) is a small, partly ice-covered ridge about 3 nautical miles (6 km) southeast of Mount Butterworth. It was plotted from ANARE air photos taken in 1956 and 1960, and was named by ANCA for C.V. McLean, a senior diesel mechanic at Wilkes Station in 1963.
- McLeod Massif (70°46′S 68°0′E) is a large rock massif just south of Manning Massif in the eastern part of the Aramis Range. It was plotted from air photographs, and first visited by the ANARE Prince Charles Mountains survey in 1969. The feature was named by ANCA for I.R. McLeod, geologist-in-charge of geological field operations during the ANARE Prince Charles Mountains surveys of 1969 and 1970.
- Murray Dome (70°42′S 67°12′E) is a dome-shaped rock feature about 3 nautical miles (6 km) southeast of Mount McKenzie. Plotted from ANARE air photos taken in 1956 and 1960. Named by ANCA for Dr. L. Murray, medical officer at Macquarie Island in 1963 and at Wilkes Station in 1964.
- Radok Lake is a meltwater lake about four miles (6.4 km) long and marked by a slender glacier tongue feeding into it from the west, lying three miles (4.8 km) south-west of Beaver Lake and 15 miles (24 km) south-east of the Aramis Range.
- Saxton Ridge (70°37′S 66°52′E) is a mountain ridge just south of Thomson Massif. Plotted from ANARE air photos taken in 1956. Named by ANCA for R.A. Saxton, officer in charge at Wilkes Station in 1963.
- Thomson Massif (70°35′S 66°48′E) is a rock massif from which rise Mount Sundberg and Mount McGregor. Plotted from ANARE air photos taken in 1956 and 1960. Named by ANCA for R.B. Thomson, officer in charge at Wilkes Station in 1962.
- Walker Valley (70°41′S 67°33′E) is a large, wide, snow-filled valley lying immediately west of Manning Massif. Mapped from ANARE air photographs. Named by ANCA for K.G. Walker, expedition assistant with the ANARE Prince Charles Mountains survey party in 1970.
- White Massif (70°32′S 67°13′E) is a rock massif about 3 nautical miles (6 km) east-northeast of Thomson Massif in the Aramis Range Plotted from ANARE air photos taken in 1956 and 1960. Named by ANCA for R.F. White, senior technician (electronics) at Mawson Station in 1963 who died there on 18 October 1963.
