= Porthos Range =

Mountain range in Antarctica

The Porthos Range is the second range south in the Prince Charles Mountains of Antarctica, extending for about 30 miles in an east-to-west direction between Scylla Glacier and Charybdis Glacier. First visited in December 1956 by the Australian National Antarctic Research Expeditions (ANARE) southern party under W.G. Bewsher (1956-57) and named after Porthos, a character in Alexandre Dumas, père's novel The Three Musketeers, the most popular book read on the southern journey.

== Features ==
- Charybdis Glacier
- Corry Massif (70°27′S 64°36′E) is a large massif marked by an unusual moraine pattern on the north side, standing 3 nautical miles (6 km) west-northwest of Crohn Massif. It was mapped from ANARE surveys and air photos, 1955–65, and named by the Antarctic Names Committee of Australia (ANCA)(ANCA) for M.J. Corry, a surveyor at Mawson Station in 1965.
- Crohn Massif (70°27′S 64°57′E) is a large, domed massif in Antarctica, 3 nautical miles (6 km) west of Mount Kirkby. It was sighted by the ANARE southern party and named for Peter W. Crohn, a geologist at Mawson Station in 1955 and 1956.
- Cutcliffe Peak (70°32′S 65°17′E) is a peak just south of Mount Mervyn. It was plotted from ANARE air photos of 1965, and named by the ANCA for M.A. Cutcliffe, an electrical fitter at Mawson Station in 1966, who assisted with the ANARE survey program.
- Hulcombe Ridge (70°24′S 66°15′E) is a rock ridge, extending 1.5 nautical miles (3 km) in a north–south direction, situated 3 nautical miles (6 km) west of Wignall Peak. It was plotted from ANARE air photos taken in 1956, and named by the ANCA for G.C. Hulcombe, a diesel mechanic at Davis Station in 1962.
- Martin Massif (70°28′S 65°40′E) is a massif just east of Mount Lied. It was plotted from ANARE air photos, and was named for P.J. Martin, officer in charge at Mawson Station in 1964.
- Morgan Ridge (70°29′S 64°41′E) is a small rock ridge trending east–west, standing between Mount Pollard and Mount Small. It was mapped from ANARE surveys and air photos, 1956–65, and was named by the ANCA for P.J. Morgan, a glaciologist at Wilkes Station in 1964.
- Mount Canham (70°29′S 64°35′E) is a mountain at the north end of the Bennett Escarpment, about 2 nautical miles (4 km) south of Corry Massif. The feature was plotted from ANARE air photos of 1965, and named by the ANCA for J.R. Canham, officer in charge at Wilkes Station in 1967.
- Mount Creighton (70°25′S 65°39′E) is a mountain about 3 nautical miles (6 km) east-northeast of Mount Gavaghan. It was plotted from ANARE air photos and named for D.F. Creighton, an electronics engineer at Mawson Station in 1963.
- Mount Eather (70°29′S 65°50′E) is a mountain about 2 nautical miles (4 km) south of the Martin Massif. It was plotted from ANARE air photos, and was named for R.H. Eather, an auroral physicist at Mawson Station in 1963.
- Mount Gaston (70°25′S 65°47′E) is a mountain 0.5 nautical miles (1 km) southeast of Mount Tarr. It was plotted from ANARE air photos of 1965, and was named by the ANCA for Joseph Gaston, an aircraft engineer with the ANARE Prince Charles Mountains survey party in 1969.
- Mount Gavaghan (70°26′S 65°27′E) is a mountain between Mount Kirkby and Mount Creighton. It was plotted from ANARE air photos, and was named for E.J. Gavaghan, a radio operator at Mawson Station in 1963.
- Mount Kirkby is a very large, prominent, linear, flat-topped mountain on the northern face of the Porthos Range. Situated about 3 nautical miles (6 km) east of Crohn Massif, it is approximately 9 kilometres (5 nmi) long east–west and 4 kilometres (2 nmi) wide at the western end, tapering to the east. It rises to 2,100 metres (6,890 ft) (460 metres (1,500 ft) above the plateau). The mountain was first visited by the ANARE southern party in December 1956, and was named by the ANCA for Sydney L. Kirkby, a surveyor at Mawson Station in 1956 and 1960.
- Mount Kerr (70°26′S 65°38′E), a mountain about 0.5 nautical miles (1 km) south of Mount Creighton. It was plotted from ANARE air photos of 1965, and was named by the ANCA for A.G. Kerr, a physicist at Mawson Station in 1967.
- Mount Leckie (70°26′S 66°0′E) is a roughly circular outcrop about 3 nautical miles (6 km) east of Martin Massif. It was visited by the ANARE southern party, and was named for Squadron Leader D.W. Leckie, Royal Australian Air Force, who commanded the RAAF Antarctic Flight at Mawson Station, 1956.
- Mount Lied (70°30′S 65°33′E) is a prominent pyramidal peak about 7 nautical miles (13 km) east-northeast of Mount Mervyn. . It was sighted by the ANARE southern party lin 1956 and named for Nils T. Lied, a weather observer at Mawson Station in 1956 and at Davis Station in 1957.
- Mount McCarthy is the easternmost peak, 1,860 metres (6,100 ft) high, of the Porthos Range. It was first visited by the ANARE southern party in 1956, and was named by the ANCA for James W. McCarthy, senior meteorologist and second in charge at Mawson Station in 1956.
- Mount Mervyn (70°31′S 65°13′E) is a very sharp peak standing south of the main body of the Porthos Range, about 6 nautical miles (11 km) south of Mount Kirkby. It was sighted in December 1956 by the ANARE southern party and named for Mervyn Christensen, a weather observer at Mawson Station in 1956.
- Mount Pollard (70°28′S 64°37′E) is a partly snow-covered mountain just south of Corry Massif and 3 nautical miles (6 km) west of Crohn Massif. Mapped from ANARE surveys and air photos, 1956–65. It was named by ANCA for J.R. Pollard, ionosphere physicist at Wilkes Station, 1964.
- Mount Small (70°30′S 64°42′E) is a partly snow-covered peak standing 2 nautical miles (3.7 km) southwest of Crohn Massif. It was mapped from ANARE surveys and air photos, 1956–65. It was named by ANCA for G.R. Small, geophysicist at Wilkes Station, 1964.
- Mount Tarr (70°25′S 65°46′E) is a mountain 1.5 miles (2.4 km) east-southeast of Mount Creighton. It was plotted from ANARE air photos of 1965. It was named by ANCA for F. Tarr, aircraft engineer with the ANARE Prince Charles Mountains survey party in 1969.
- Mount Ware (70°27′S 65°36′E) is a mountain just south of Mount Kerr. It was plotted from ANARE air photos of 1965. Named by ANCA for W.R. Ware, weather observer at Mawson Station in 1968.
- O'Shea Peak (70°26′S 66°31′E) is a small peak just south of Mount McCarthy in the eastern part of the Porthos Range. Plotted from ANARE air photos taken in 1956 and 1960. Named for J.H. O'Shea, radio officer at Wilkes Station in 1962 and 1964 and at Macquarie Island in 1966.
- Thomas Nunataks (70°32′S 65°11′E) is a group of three nunataks lying 2 nautical miles (3.7 km) southwest of Mount Mervyn. Plotted from ANARE air photos of 1965. Named by ANCA for I.L. Thomas, physicist at Mawson Station in 1967.
- Webster Peaks is a group of five peaks 3 nautical miles (6 km) southeast of Mount Kirkby. Plotted from ANARE air photos of 1965. Named by ANCA for G.K. Webster, ionospheric physicist at Mawson Station in 1965.
- Whitworth Ridge (70°24′S 66°8′E) is a rock ridge about 2 nautical miles (3.7 km) northeast of Mount Leckie. Plotted from ANARE air photos taken in 1956. Named by ANCA for R. Whitworth, geophysicist at Wilkes Station in 1963.
- Wignall Peak (70°24′S 66°24′E) is a small peak just west of Mount McCarthy. Plotted from ANARE air photos taken in 1956 and 1960. Named for R. Wignall, weather observer at Davis Station in 1964.
