= Stump Mountain =

Mountain in Mac. Robertson Land, Antarctica

Stump Mountain (67°29′S 60°56′E) is a rock peak over 310 m high, about 2 nautical miles (3.7 km) southwest of Byrd Head, Mac. Robertson Land. Mapped by Norwegian cartographers from air photos taken by the Lars Christensen Expedition, 1936–37, and named Stabben (the stump). The translated form of the name recommended by Antarctic Names Committee of Australia (ANCA) has been approved.
