= Robert Jacklyn =

Australian physicist (1922-2014)

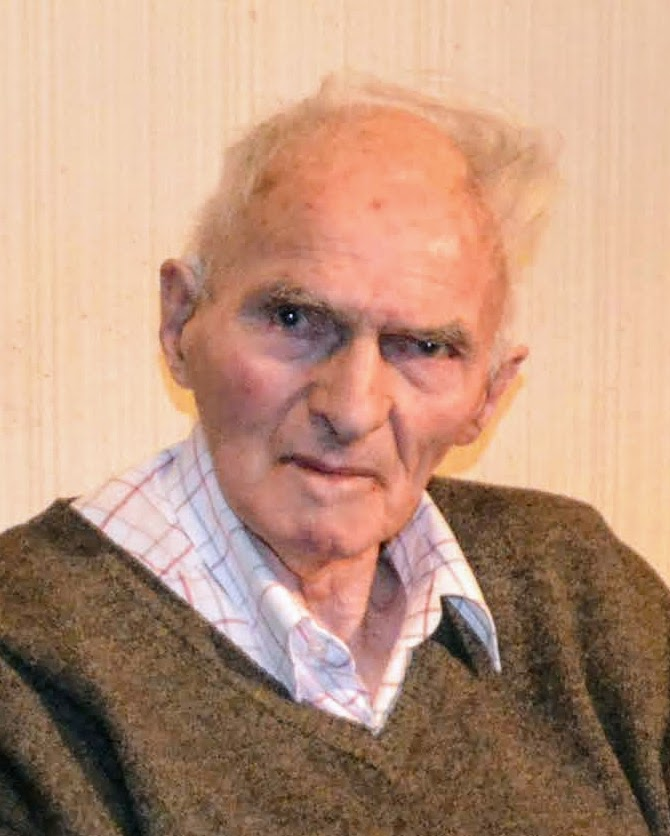
- Robert Jacklyn in 2012
- Born: 13 January 1922
- Died: 18 June 2014 (aged 92)
- Scientific career
- Fields: Cosmic rays
- Institutions: Macquarie Island; Mawson Station

Bob Jacklyn (January 13, 1922 – June 18, 2014) was an Australian cosmic ray physicist, and former head of the Australian Antarctic Division's research program. Mount Jacklyn, located in the Athos Range of Antarctica, is named after him for his important research at Mawson Station in 1956.

== Antarctic research ==
Bob's team at Macquarie Island and Mawson Station provided new information about the nature and source of cosmic rays. Specifically, his team reaffirmed that the rays primary source was from 'storms' on the Sun, and suggested that a small proportion of these rays had sidereal rather than solar periodicity. This important finding implied a Galactic or extra-galactic origin.
