= Athos Range =

Northernmost range in the Prince Charles Mountains of Antarctica

Highest point
- Elevation: 1,640 m (5,380 ft)

Naming
- Etymology: Character from The Three Musketeers, a book read during an early ascent

Geography
- Continent: Antarctica
- Area: Mac. Robertson Land
- Range coordinates: 70°13′S 64°50′E
- Parent range: Prince Charles Mountains

Climbing
- First ascent: John Béchervaise (Nov 1955)

Athos Range in eastern Antarctica

Athos Range (70°13′S 64°50′E) is the northernmost range in the Prince Charles Mountains of Mac. Robertson Land, Antarctica. The range consists of many individual mountains and nunataks that trend east–west for 40 miles (64 km) along the north side of Scylla Glacier.

These mountains were first observed from aircraft of U.S. Navy Operation Highjump, 1946–47. The western part of the range was first visited by an ANARE Australian National Antarctic Research Expeditions (ANARE) party led by John Béchervaise in November 1955. The range was again visited in December 1956 by the ANARE southern party, 1956–57, led by W.G. Bewsher, and a depot was established at the eastern extremity. It was named after a character in The Three Musketeers, a novel by Alexandre Dumas, père which was the most popular book read on the southern journey.

== Key mountains ==
- Mount Albion (70°17′S 65°39′E) is a mountain 2 miles (3.2 km) south-southeast of Mount O'Shea in the south part of the Athos Range. Discovered by an ANARE southern party led by W.G. Bewsher (1956–57) and named for Patrick Albion, radio operator at Mawson Station in 1956.
- Farley Massif (70°13′S 65°48′E) is a mountain one mile north of Mount Jacklyn. Plotted from ANARE air photos and named for J.A. Farley, surveyor at Mawson Station in 1964.
- Giddings Peak (70°12′S 64°44′E) is a small peak just west of Mount Bechervaise. Plotted from ANARE air photos of 1965 and named by ANCA after A. Giddings, cook at Wilkes Station in 1959.
- Mount Jacklyn (70°15′S 65°53′E) is a conical peak surmounting a horseshoe-shaped ridge 1 mile (1.6 km) south of Farley Massif, in the eastern part of the Athos Range. First visited by an ANARE southern party led by W.G. Bewsher (1956–57) and named for Robert Jacklyn, cosmic ray physicist at Mawson Station in 1956.
- Mount O'Shea (70°15′S 65°35′E) is a mountain two miles NNW of Mount Albion. Plotted from ANARE air photos and named for A.J. O'Shea, assistant diesel mechanic at Mawson Station in 1964.
- Mount Shennan (70°14′S 65°33′E) is a mountain four miles (6.4 km) west of Farley Massif. Plotted from ANARE air photos and named for K. J. Shennan, assistant diesel mechanic at Mawson Station in 1963.
- Mount Starlight (70°12′S 64°30′E) is an extensive ridge of exposed brown rock with steep sides but no sharp peaks, standing at the western end of the Athos Range. Sighted in November 1955 by an ANARE party led by J. M. Bechervaise. Named to commemorate the so-called Operation Starlight during which depots were laid for further work and mapping and geological investigations accomplished.

== Features ==
Geographical features include:

- Allison Ridge (70°45′S 66°19′E) is a rock ridge, partly snow-covered, about 0.5 nautical miles (1 km) west of Mount Bunt. It was plotted from ANARE air photos taken in 1960 and was named by the ANCA for D. Allison, an electrical engineer at Mawson Station in 1965.
- Bradley Ridge (70°14′S 65°15′E) is a rock ridge about 7 nautical miles (13 km) southeast of Mount Peter. It was plotted from ANARE air photos, and named for R.G. Bradley, a weather observer at Mawson Station in 1964.
- Dawson Nunatak (70°13′S 65°2′E) is a nunatak about 3 nautical miles (6 km) south-southeast of Mount Peter. It was plotted from ANARE air photos, and named for P.L. Dawson, a senior diesel mechanic at Mawson Station in 1964.
- Harriss Ridge (70°8′S 65°8′E) is an east–west ridge with two small outliers off its west end, located 2 nautical miles (4 km) northeast of Mount Dovers. It was plotted from ANARE air photos taken in 1965, and named by ANCA for B. Harriss, a helicopter pilot with the Prince Charles Mountains survey party in 1969.
- The Hunt Nunataks (70°11′S 64°53′E) are a linear group of nunataks, 2 nautical miles (4 km) long, lying just east of Mount Bechervaise. They were plotted by the ANARE from air photos obtained in 1965, and named by ANCA for P. Hunt, a senior helicopter pilot with the Prince Charles Mountains survey party in 1969.
- The Kotterer Peaks (70°11′S 64°26′E) are a group of small peaks standing between the Wignall Nunataks and Mount Starlight. They were mapped from ANARE surveys and air photos, 1955–65, and were named by ANCA for C. Kotterer, a weather observer at Davis Station, 1964.
- Leah Ridge (70°13′S 65°0′E) is a rock ridge located 1 nautical mile (2 km) northwest of Dawson Nunatak and 5 nautical miles (9 km) southeast of Mount Béchervaise. The feature was intersected by an ANARE survey party in November 1966 and climbed by the party in December 1966. It was so named by ANCA because "Leah" was the code word used at Mawson Station to identify the survey party.
- McKenzie Peak is a peak just south of Mount Albion. It was plotted from ANARE air photos of 1965, and was named by ANCA for J.F. McKenzie, a radio technician at Wilkes Station in 1963.
- Miller Ridge (70°8′S 65°30′E) is a rock ridge 1 nautical mile (2 km) east of Mount Seedsman on the north side of the Athos Range. It was plotted from ANARE air photos, and was named for L.D. Miller, a radio operator at Mawson Station in 1964.
- Mount Béchervaise (70°11′S 64°48′E) is a great massif of brown rock, 2,360 m, standing one nautical mile (1.9 km) east of Mount Lacey in the Athos Range, Prince Charles Mountains. It has a sheer north face and is bare except for an icecap on the flat summit. First visited in November 1955 by an ANARE party led by John M. Béchervaise, officer in charge at Mawson Station in 1955, for whom it is named.
- Mount Bool (70°11′S 64°57′E) is a mountain between Mount Peter and Mount Dwyer. Plotted by ANARE from air photos taken in 1965. Named by ANCA for G.A. Bool, weather observer at Mawson Station, who assisted with the Prince Charles Mountains survey in 1969.
- Mount Cardell is an elongated mountain 2 nautical miles (4 km) northwest of Bradley Ridge. It was plotted from ANARE air photos, and named for N. Cardell, senior technician (electronics) at Mawson Station in 1964.
- Mount Cartledge (70°17′S 65°43′E) is a mountain just east of Mount Albion. It was plotted from ANARE air photos of 1965, and named by ANCA for W.J. Cartledge, plumber at Wilkes Station in 1962, and carpenter at Mawson Station in 1966.
- Mount Dart is a mountain 1.5 nautical miles (3 km) southeast of Mount Dwyer. It was plotted from ANARE air photos taken in 1965, and named by ANCA for J.R. Dart, a radio operator at Mawson Station who took part in the Prince Charles Mountains survey in 1969.
- Mount Dovers (70°8′S 64°59′E) is a high, brown rock ridge 2 nautical miles (4 km) northwest of Mount Dwyer. It was observed from the Stinear Nunataks in 1954 by an ANARE party led by Robert G. Dovers, officer in charge at Mawson Station, and its position was plotted in December 1955 by a party led by John Béchervaise. It was named by ANCA for Robert G. Dovers.
- Mount Dwyer (70°11′S 65°4′E) is a mountain 2 nautical miles (4 km) southeast of Mount Dovers. It was plotted from ANARE air photos, and was named for V.J. Dwyer, a radio operator at Mawson Station in 1964.
- Mount Lacey (70°11′S 64°43′E) is a high, pyramidal, brown rock mountain with two sharp peaks, standing 1 nautical mile (2 km) west of Mount Béchervaise. It was first sighted by an ANARE party led by John Béchervaise in November 1955 and plotted by R.H. Lacey, a surveyor at Mawson Station in 1955, for whom it is named.
- Mount Mercer is a mountain 2 nautical miles (4 km) west of Farley Massif. It was plotted from ANARE air photos of 1965, and was named by ANCA for B. Mercer, a weather observer at Davis Station in 1961.
- Mount Moonie (70°13′S 65°7′E) is a mountain just south of Mount Dart and 1 nautical mile (2 km) west of Mount Cardell. It was plotted from ANARE air photos taken in 1965, and was named by ANCA for P. J. Moonie, a radio operator at Mawson Station in 1967 and 1969, and a member of the Prince Charles Mountains survey party in 1969.
- Mount Peter (70°11′S 64°56′E) is a large dome-shaped rock outcrop with a flat, sheer north face, about four kilometres (two nautical miles) east of Mount Bechervaise. First visited in November 1955 by an ANARE party led by J.M. Bechervaise. Named by ANCA for Peter Crohn, geologist at Mawson Station, 1955–1956.
- Mount Seedsman (70°9′S 65°26′E) is a mountain about 8 nautical miles (15 km) east of Mount Dovers. Plotted from ANARE air photos. Named for Donald Linton Seedsman, electronics engineer at Mawson Station in 1964.
- Mount Stalker (70°9′S 65°37′E) is a mountain in the northern part of the Athos Range, about 5 nautical miles (9 km) northwest of Farley Massif. Plotted from ANARE air photos. Named for J.F. Stalker, weather observer at Mawson Station in 1964.
- Smith Nunatak is a nunatak just southeast of Mount Starlight. The nunatak is marked by a moraine which extends 2 nautical miles (3.7 km) north from it. Plotted from ANARE air photos of 1965. Named by ANCA for J.C. Smith, diesel mechanic at Wilkes Station in 1960.
- Svensson Ridge (70°11′S 64°29′E) is a rock ridge 1 nautical mile (1.9 km) northwest of Mount Starlight. Mapped from ANARE surveys and air photos, 1955–65. Named by ANCA for A. Svensson, weather observer at Davis Station, 1964.
- Weasel Gap (70°11′S 64°39′E) is a gap with a surface and a low gradient offering a feasible north–south route between Mount Starlight and Mount Lacey. Sighted in November 1955 by an ANARE party led by J.M. Bechervaise. Named after the tracked vehicles used by ANARE.
- Whelan Nunatak is an isolated nunatak standing 5 nautical miles (9 km) northwest of Mount Starlight. Mapped by ANARE from air photos taken in 1965. Named by ANCA for R.F. Whelan, radio officer at Davis Station, 1964.
- The Wignall Nunataks (70°10′S 64°23′E) are two snow-covered nunataks standing 2 nautical miles (3.7 km) northwest of Mount Starlight. Mapped from ANARE surveys and air photos, 1955–65. Named by ANCA for R. Wignall, weather observer at Davis Station, 1964.
