= Summers Peak =

Mountain in Antarctica

Summers Peak (69°42′S 64°53′E) is the highest peak (2,225 m) of the Stinear Nunataks in Mac. Robertson Land. Discovered by an ANARE (Australian National Antarctic Research Expeditions) southern party (1954) led by R.G. Dovers, who named it for Dr. R.O. Summers, medical officer at Mawson Station in 1954.

== Features ==
- Peak Seven
