= Cotcliffe =

Hamlet and civil parish in North Yorkshire, England

Coordinates: 54.3104°N 1.3592°W

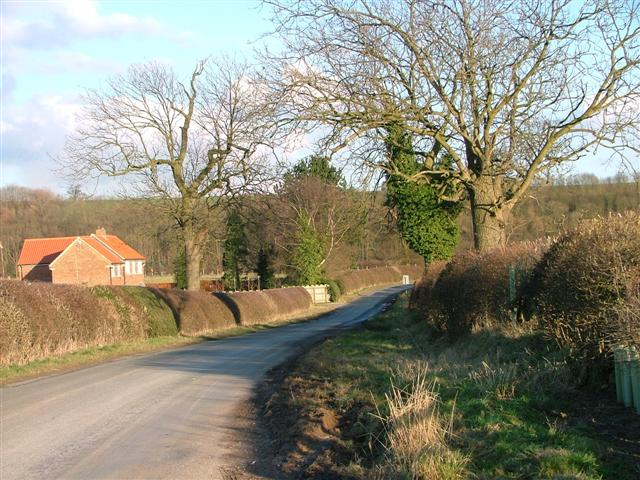

- Location within North Yorkshire
- Population: 10 (2015 NYCC)
- Civil parish: Cotcliffe
- Unitary authority: North Yorkshire
- Ceremonial county: North Yorkshire
- Region: Yorkshire and the Humber
- Country: England
- Sovereign state: United Kingdom
- Post town: Northallerton
- Postcode district: DL6
- Dialling code: 01845
- Police: North Yorkshire
- Fire: North Yorkshire
- Ambulance: Yorkshire
- UK Parliament: Richmond and Northallerton

Cotcliffe is a hamlet and civil parish in the county of North Yorkshire, England. The hamlet is 3.7 miles (6 km) south east of Northallerton and 0.62 miles (1 km) west of the A19 road. In 2015, North Yorkshire County Council estimated the population to be ten people.

From 1974 to 2023 it was part of the Hambleton District, it is now administered by the unitary North Yorkshire Council.
