= Scoble Glacier =

Glacier in Mac. Robertson Land, Antarctica

- Location within Antarctica
- Location: Mac. Robertson Land
- Coordinates: 67°23′S 60°27′E
- Length: 4 nmi (7 km; 5 mi)
- Thickness: unknown
- Status: unknown

Scoble Glacier (67°23′S 60°27′E) is a glacier 4 nautical miles (7 km) west of Campbell Head in Mac. Robertson Land. Mapped by Norwegian cartographers from air photos taken by the Lars Christensen Expedition, 1936–37, and named Breoddane (the glacier points). Renamed by Antarctic Names Committee of Australia (ANCA) for Charles H. Scoble, diesel engineer at Macquarie Island station, who drowned in July 1948.

== See also ==
- List of glaciers in the Antarctic
- Glaciology
