= Stinear Nunataks =

Ice-covered mountains in Antarctica

Stinear Nunataks (69°42′S 64°40′E) is a group of dark brown nunataks about 16 nautical miles (30 km) north of Anare Nunataks in Mac. Robertson Land. Visited by an ANARE (Australian National Antarctic Research Expeditions) southern party (1954) led by R.G. Dovers. He named the group for B.H. Stinear, geologist at Mawson Station in 1954. Among the peaks is Zebra Peak, named for its distinctive alternating bands of light and dark rocks. The isolated peak 15 nautical miles (28 km) southeast of the Stinears is named Mount Macey.

== Features ==
- Peak Seven
