= Nigel Berlyn =

Royal Australian Navy officer (1934–2022)

Rear Admiral Nigel Berlyn AO
- Born: 26 August 1934; Plymouth, England
- Died: 17 February 2022 (aged 87); Bowral, New South Wales, Australia
- Military career
- Allegiance: United Kingdom; Australia
- Branch: Royal Navy (1952–65); Royal Australian Navy (1965–90)
- Service years: 1952–90
- Rank: Rear Admiral
- Commands: Garden Island Dockyard
- Conflicts: Vietnam War; Indonesia–Malaysia confrontation
- Awards: Officer of the Order of Australia

Rear Admiral Nigel Richard Benbow Berlyn AO (26 August 1934 – 17 February 2022) was a senior Royal Australian Navy officer who was general manager of the Garden Island Dockyard from 1984 to 1987.

== Naval career ==
Born on 26 August 1934, he attended the Nautical College, Pangbourne. Berlyn then joined the Royal Navy in 1952. He spent 1964–65 on an exchange with the RAN, during which time he served as the Practical Training Co-ordinator at HMAS Nirimba. At the end of his tenure in 1965, he transferred to the RAN and subsequently served as mechanical engineering officer on HMAS Vampire from 1966 to 1967. Between 1967 and 1970, Berlyn was senior project planner at Garden Island Dockyard before serving as a mechanical engineering officer aboard HMAS Melbourne during 1971 and 1972.

In 1973, he attended Joint Services Staff College before serving as programming and planning manager of the DDL Project. He then undertook the role of director of the Adelaide-class guided missile frigate Acquisition Project.

He retired from the RAN in 1990, having served as general manager of the Garden Island Dockyard with the rank of rear admiral between 1984 and 1987.

Berlyn died in Bowral, New South Wales on 17 February 2022, at the age of 87.

== Honours and awards ==
- Officer of the Order of Australia (AO), 1987
- National Medal, 1981
- Member of the Order of Australia (AM), 1978
