= Anare Nunataks =

Snow-covered ridges on Mac. Robertson Land

- Location within Antarctica

Highest point
- Peak: 2,035 metres (6,680 ft)

Naming
- Etymology: The acronym for the Australian National Antarctic Research Expeditions

Geography
- Continent: Antarctica
- Area: Mac. Robertson Land
- Range coordinates: 69°58′S 64°37′E

Climbing
- First ascent: ANARE (1955)

The Anare Nunataks (69°58′S 64°37′E) are a group of mainly snow-covered ridges with exposed rock summits rising to 2,035 metres (6,680 ft), standing 16 nautical miles (30 km) south of the Stinear Nunataks in Mac. Robertson Land. First visited in November 1955 by an Australian National Antarctic Research Expeditions (ANARE) party led by John Béchervaise, the name is taken from the acronym of the expedition.

The Anare Nunataks include Mount Macklin.
