= Mount Menzies =

Peak on Fisher Glacier, Antarctica

Coordinates: 73°30′S 61°50′E

- Location within Antarctica

Highest point
- Elevation: 3,220 m (10,560 ft)
- Prominence: 1,177 m (3,862 ft)
- Listing: Ribu

Mount Menzies is the culminating peak (003,220 m; 010,560 ft) on the large massif between Mount Mather and Mount Bayliss, standing on the south side of Fisher Glacier, Antarctica. It was sighted by Flying Officer J. Seaton from an ANARE Beaver aircraft in 1956, and mapped by an ANARE southern seismic party under K.B. Mather in 1957–58. Mount Menzies was named by ANCA after the Rt. Hon. Robert Menzies, Prime Minister of Australia, 1939–41 and 1949–66.

== First ascent ==
Mount Menzies was first reached and climbed by Dave Keyser, Jim Seavers and Dave Trail, in December 1961. With two teams of five dogs each, this three-man party left Mawson Station early in November, accompanying a five-man tractor party (G. Maslen, I. Todd, G. Wilkinson, R. Wyers and W. Young) to recover a D-4 Caterpillar tractor left for lack of fuel on the polar plateau at latitude 70°34' South. The three-man dog sledge party continued south to a small plywood caravan left at Binders Base at 72°36' South by the 1960 Mawson party, in order to re-provision and sledge on to the Fisher Glacier. Crevasses slowed the party, but one day sufficed to cross the glacier, and after inspecting the formidable ice-falls on the south side on Mt. Menzies, the party climbed the mountain from the north, plodding through the night – mainly over moraine – to reach the summit at midnight on 19 December 1961.

From Mt Menzies, the party sledged further south and east in unsuccessful attempts (prevented by crevasses) to reach Keyser Ridge and Mount Ruker. The party then crossed the Fisher Glacier on better ground from the north-east end of the Menzies Massif directly to Seavers Nunataks and from there, returned to Binders Base on 31 December. The dog sledge party then reached Mawson on 27 January 1962.

== See also ==
- List of mountains of Mac. Robertson Land
