= Antarctic Flight RAAF =

- Active: 1948–1963
- Country: Australia
- Branch: Royal Australian Air Force
- Role: Expeditions and Rescue
- Current base: RAAF Base Laverton

The Antarctic Flight was a Royal Australian Air Force (RAAF) aircraft flight. It operated from RAAF Base Laverton and Mawson Station. The flight was responsible for expeditions and rescue missions in Antarctica.

Two ski fitted RAAF Auster AOP.6 (A11-200 & A11-201) were based at Mawson Station from 1952. On 5 March 1954, A11-200 was lost over the side of a ship. Later the flight included two DHC-2 Beavers and one Dakota aircraft. After 1963, the RAAF planes were withdrawn.

Following this time RAAF aircraft have continued to operate infrequently in support of activities in the Antarctic and sub-Antarctic islands. These have included a number of flights using C-130 Hercules in the 1970s and 1980s into McMurdo Sound and more recently C-17 Globemasters to Wilkins Aerodrome near Casey Station in late 2015 and early 2016.
