= Prince Charles Mountains =

Mountain range in Antarctica

- Location within Antarctica

Highest point
- Peak: Mount Menzies
- Elevation: 3,228 m (10,591 ft)

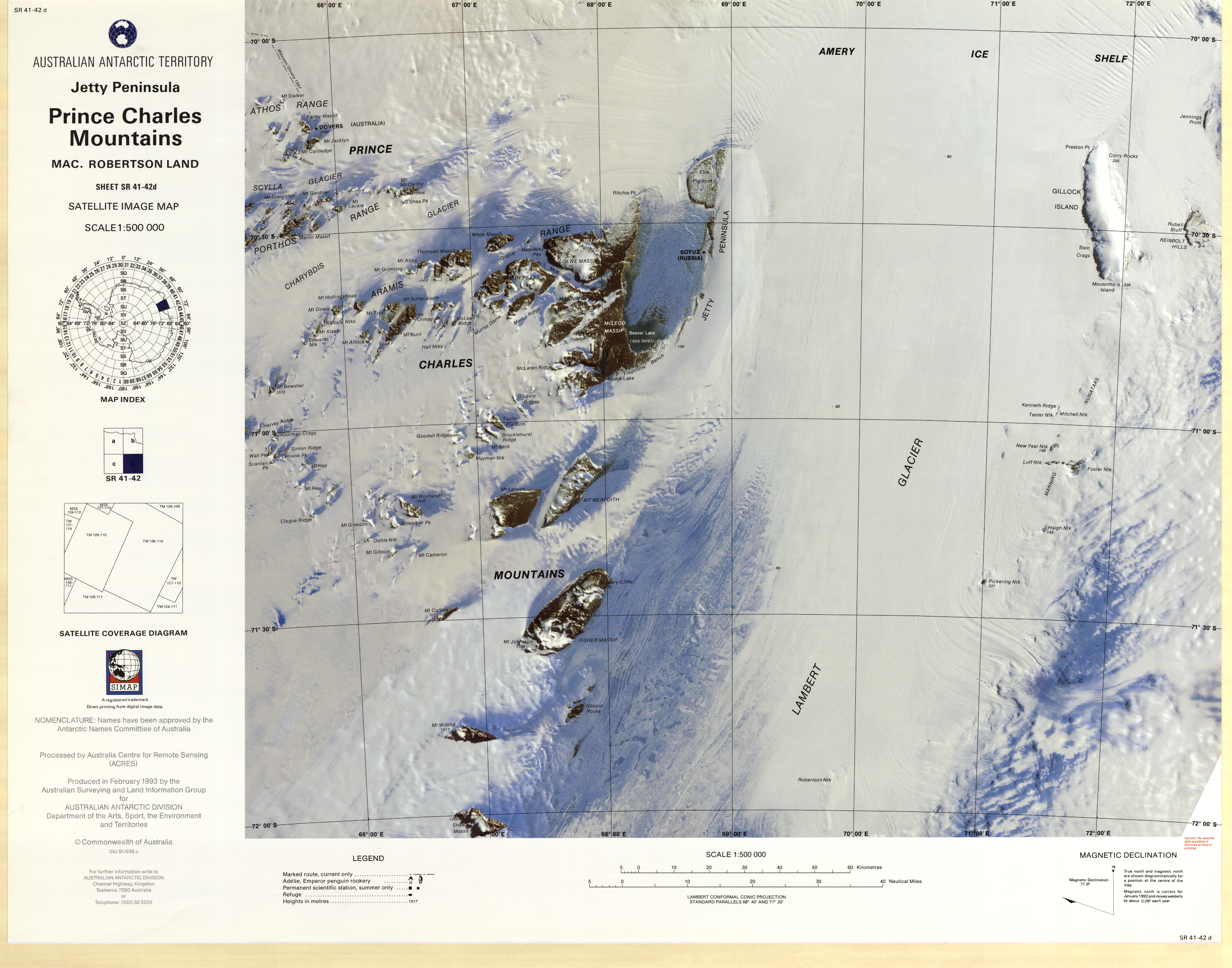

The Prince Charles Mountains are a major group of mountains in Mac. Robertson Land in Antarctica, including the Athos Range, the Porthos Range, and the Aramis Range. The highest peak is Mount Menzies, with a height of 3,228 m (10,591 ft). Other prominent peaks are Mount Izabelle and Mount Stinear (1,950 m; 6,400 ft). These mountains, together with other scattered peaks, form an arc about 420 km (260 mi) long, extending from the vicinity of Mount Starlight in the north to Goodspeed Nunataks in the south.

These mountains were first observed and photographed from a distance by airmen of USN Operation Highjump, 1946–47. They were examined by several ANARE (Australian National Antarctic Research Expeditions) parties and mapped in the years 1954–61. They have been found to contain large deposits of iron ore. They were named by ANCA in 1956 for King Charles III, then the eight-year-old Prince Charles and son of Queen Elizabeth II.

== List of key mountains ==
- Mount Afflick (70°46′S 66°11′E) is a ridge-like mountain about 3 miles (5 km) west of Mount Bunt in the Aramis Range. Plotted from ANARE air photos taken in 1960. Named by ANCA for G.M. Afflick, weather observer at Mawson Station in 1965.
- Mount Bayliss (73°32′S 62°44′E) is a relatively low mountain, extending 9 nautical miles (17 km) in an east–west direction, standing 6 nautical miles (11 km) east of Mount Menzies. Observed from ANARE aircraft in 1957 and seen in the same year by an ANARE ground party under K.B. Mather. Named by ANCA for E.P. Bayliss, Australian cartographer, who drew the map of Antarctica published in 1939 by the Property and Survey Branch, Dept. of Interior, Canberra.
- Mount Bunt (70°46′S 66°22′E) is a sharp, conical peak, 2,315 metres (7,600 ft) high, which appears slightly truncated when viewed from the northwest, situated at the southwest end of a group of low peaks about 7 nautical miles (13 km) southeast of Mount Hollingshead in the Aramis Range. It was sighted in January 1957 by the ANARE southern party led by W.G. Bewsher, and named by ANCA for J.S. Bunt, a biologist at Mawson Station in 1956.
- Mount Cartledge (70°17′S 65°43′E) is a mountain just east of Mount Albion in the Athos Range. It was plotted from ANARE air photos of 1965, and named by ANCA for W.J. Cartledge, plumber at Wilkes Station in 1962, and carpenter at Mawson Station in 1966.
- Mount Gibson (71°20′S 66°20′E) is a small mountain about 2.5 nautical miles (4.6 km) west of Mount Cameron and 3 nautical miles (5.6 km) south of Schmitter Peak. Plotted from ANARE air photos taken in 1956 and 1960. Named by ANCA after P.R. Gibson, plumber at Wilkes Station in 1965.
- Mount Izabelle (72°10′S 66°30′E) is a bare rock mountain standing 12 miles (19 km) southwest of the Shaw Massif. Discovered from an ANARE Beaver aircraft on November 28, 1956, while engaged in aerial photography. Named by ANCA for B. Izabelle, weather observer at Mawson Station in 1957.
- Mount Meredith (71°12′S 67°45′E) is a fairly massive, almost flat-topped mountain standing 10 nautical miles (19 km) north of Fisher Massif. It was photographed from ANARE aircraft in 1956 and 1957, and was named by ANCA for Sergeant N. Meredith, RAAF, an engine fitter at Mawson Station in 1957.
- Mount Rymill (73°03′S 65°50′E) is a fairly massive mountain with an undulating surface marked by extensive formation of stone polygons, standing 6 mi W of Mount Stinear. Photographed from the air by ANARE, 1956–58. Named by ANCA for John Riddoch Rymill, leader of the British Graham Land Expedition, 1934–37.
- Schmitter Peak (71°16′S 66°21′E) is a small mountain peak about 3 mi SW of Mount Woinarski. Plotted from ANARE air photos taken in 1956 and 1960. Named by ANCA for U. Schmitter, cook at Davis Station in 1964.
- Shaw Massif (72°01′S 66°51′E) is a fairly flat-topped rock massif (1,355 m) on the west margin of Lambert Glacier standing 20 km (12 mi) south of Mount Willing. Sighted in November 1956 from an ANARE aircraft. Named by ANCA for Bernard Shaw, radio supervisor at Mawson Station in 1957.
- Simon Ridge (71°03′S 65°30′E) is an arc-shaped rock ridge about 13 km (8 mi) southeast of Husky Massif. Plotted from ANARE air photos taken in 1960. Named for M.J. Simon, radio officer at Wilkes Station in 1962.
- Mount Stinear (73°04′S 66°24′E) is a prominent rock peak on a large massif rising to 1,950 metres (6,398 ft), standing just east of Mount Rymill at the junction of Fisher Glacier and Lambert Glacier. It was mapped from air photos taken by the RAAF Antarctic Flight in 1956, and first visited in October 1957 by an ANARE party led by Bruce H. Stinear, geologist at Mawson Station, for whom it is named.

== Other features ==
=== Ridges ===
- Baggott Ridge (70°19′S 64°19′E) is a low ridge, mostly snow-covered, standing 1.5 nautical miles (3 km) west of Baldwin Nunatak and 7 nautical miles (13 km) south-southwest of Mount Starlight. It was mapped from ANARE surveys and air photos, 1955–65, and named by ANCA for P.J. Baggott, a radio officer at Mawson Station, 1965.
- Bond Ridge (70°16′S 65°13′E) is a rock ridge 1 nautical mile (2 km) northeast of Moore Pyramid on the north side of Scylla Glacier. It was plotted from ANARE air photos of 1965, and named by ANCA for D.W.G. Bond, a senior diesel mechanic at Mawson Station in 1968.
- Brocklehurst Ridge (71°2′S 67°6′E) is a partly snow-covered rock ridge about 1 nautical mile (2 km) south of Taylor Platform. It was plotted from ANARE air photos taken in 1956 and 1960, and named by ANCA for F.J. Brocklehurst, an electrical fitter at Mawson Station in 1964.
- Clague Ridge (71°14′S 65°40′E) is a partially snow-covered rock ridge about 5 nautical miles (9 km) southwest of Armonini Nunatak. It was plotted from ANARE air photos taken in 1960, and named for E.L. Clague, weather observer at Wilkes Station in 1962.
- Goodall Ridge (71°2′S 66°50′E) is a partly snow-covered rock ridge about 6 nautical miles (11 km) west-southwest of Taylor Platform. It was plotted from ANARE air photos taken in 1956 and 1960, and was named by ANCA for A.W. Goodall, a diesel mechanic at Macquarie Island in 1962 and at Davis Station in 1964.
- The Gorman Crags (71°1′S 65°27′E) are an east–west trending ridge marked by four craggy peaks, about 5 nautical miles (10 km) east of Husky Massif. They were plotted from ANARE photos taken in 1960, and named after C.A.J. Gorman, a supervising technician (radio) at Wilkes Station in 1962.
- Keyser Ridge (73°57′S 63°28′E) is a snow-covered ridge, trending in a northeast–southwest direction for 11 nautical miles (20 km), standing 26 nautical miles (48 km) south-southeast of Mount Bayliss. It was mapped from ANARE air photos of 1957 and 1960, and was named by ANCA for D.O. Keyser, a radio officer at Mawson Station, and a member of the 1961 ANARE field party that attempted to reach this ridge but was stopped by impassable crevasses.
- The O'Leary Ridges (70°58′S 67°19′E) are three partly snow-covered ridges extending in a line NW-SE for about 5 nautical miles (9.3 km), situated 20 nautical miles (37 km) southeast of Mount Bunt. Plotted from ANARE air photos taken in 1960. Named by ANCA for R.A. O'Leary, officer in charge at Wilkes Station in 1964.

=== Nunataks ===
- Armonini Nunatak (71°11′S 65°51′E) is a partly snow-covered rock outcrop about 5 nautical miles (9 km) east-southeast of Mount Reu. There is an area of moraine on the northwest side. It was plotted from ANARE air photos taken in 1960, and named for G.C. Armonini, a weather observer at Davis Station in 1962.
- Baldwin Nunatak (70°19′S 64°24′E) is a nunatak 6.5 nautical miles (12.0 km) south-southwest of Mount Starlight. It was mapped from ANARE surveys and from air photos, 1955–65, and named by ANCA for J.W. Baldwin, a weather observer (radio) at Mawson Station, 1965.
- The Binders Nunataks (72°36′S 62°58′E) are two small, light-colored nunataks standing 37 nautical miles (69 km) north of Mount Scherger in the southern Prince Charles Mountains. They were mapped from air photos and surveys by ANARE, 1957–60, and named by ANCA after a fictional character in The Ascent of Rum Doodle, a novel by W. E. Bowman.
- Bosse Nunatak (72°8′S 65°22′E) is a small nunatak in an area of disturbed ice, about 20 nautical miles (40 km) west of Mount Izabelle. It was first sighted by J. Manning, a surveyor with the ANARE Prince Charles Mountains survey party in 1971, and named after H.E. Bosse, a helicopter pilot with the survey party.
- Carpenter Nunatak (73°37′S 61°15′E) is an isolated nunatak between Mount Mather and the Mount Menzies massif in the southern Prince Charles Mountains. It was plotted from the summit of Mount Menzies by an ANARE dog-sledge party in 1961, and named by ANCA for G.D.P. Smith, the carpenter at Mawson Station, 1961.
- Chapman Nunatak (71°8′S 64°45′E) is a nunatak about 2 nautical miles (4 km) east of Mount Hicks. It was plotted from ANARE air photos taken in 1960, and named for P.R. Chapman, weather observer at Wilkes Station in 1963.
- Dohle Nunatak (71°17′S 66°6′E) is a rock feature, consisting of two small peaks and a connecting ridge, between Mount Gleeson and Mount Gibson. It was named after C. Dohle, a helicopter pilot with the ANARE Prince Charles Mountains survey in 1971.
- Ellyard Nunatak (70°19′S 64°54′E) is a nunatak on the north side of Scylla Glacier, about 7 nautical miles (13 km) south-southeast of Mount Bechervaise. It was plotted from ANARE air photos of 1965, and named by ANCA for D.G. Ellyard, a physicist at Mawson Station in 1966.
- Ely Nunatak (72°8′S 66°30′E) is a small, dark-colored nunatak 4 nautical miles (7 km) north of Mount Izabelle. The position of the nunatak was fixed by intersection from geodetic survey stations in 1971. It was named by ANCA for J. Ely, a Technical Officer (survey) with the ANARE Prince Charles Mountains survey in 1971.
- Foale Nunatak (70°16′S 65°20′E) is a nunatak lying 4 nautical miles (7 km) east-northeast of Moore Pyramid on the north side of Scylla Glacier. It was plotted from ANARE air photos of 1965, and was named by ANCA for R.A. Foale, a radio operator at Davis Station in 1963.
- The Goodspeed Nunataks (73°0′S 61°10′E) are a group of three rows of nunataks, oriented approximately east–west and 10 to 15 miles (16 to 24 km) long, located at the west end of Fisher Glacier, about 30 miles (50 km) west-northwest of Mount McCauley. They were sighted by an ANARE seismic party led by K.B. Mather in January 1958, and named by ANCA after M.J. Goodspeed, a geophysicist at Mawson Station in 1957.
- Machin Nunatak is a small domed nunatak lying 7 nautical miles (13 km) east of Mount Cresswell. It was mapped from 1956 to 1960 air photos and surveys by ANARE, and was named by ANCA for Douglas K. Machin, a radio officer at Mawson Station in 1960.
- Mayman Nunatak (71°5′S 66°56′E) is a low rock outcrop, which has a domed appearance from the northeast, about 6 nautical miles (11 km) southwest of Taylor Platform. It was plotted from ANARE air photos taken in 1956 and 1960, and was named by ANCA for Dr. K.J. Mayman, medical officer at Davis Station in 1964.

=== Mountains ===
- Carter Peak (70°19′S 64°12′E) is a peak standing 1 nautical mile (2 km) west of Mount Bensley and 9 nautical miles (17 km) southwest of Mount Starlight. It was mapped from ANARE surveys and air photos, 1955–65, and named by ANCA for D.B. Carter, electronics technician at Mawson Station, 1965.
- Lensink Peak (71°4′S 65°25′E) is the easternmost of a group of three peaks about 5 nautical miles (9 km) southeast of Husky Massif. It was plotted from ANARE air photos taken in 1960, and named for W.H. Lensink, a weather observer at Wilkes Station in 1960.
- Moore Pyramid is a snow-covered mountain, resembling a pyramid, standing 1 nautical mile (2 km) northwest of Mount Wishart on the north side of Scylla Glacier. It was plotted from ANARE air photos, and was named for A.L. Moore, a radio operator at Mawson Station in 1963.
- Mount Bakker (70°19′S 64°36′E) is an isolated mountain marked by a northern snow-covered face, located 6.5 nautical miles (12.0 km) south-southeast of Mount Starlight. Mapped from ANARE surveys and air photos, 1955–65. Named by ANCA for F.C.R. Bakker, radio supervisor at Davis Station, 1964.
- Mount Beck (71°2′S 67°1′E) is a partly snow-covered mountain 2 nautical miles (3.7 km) southwest of Taylor Platform. Plotted from ANARE air photos taken in 1956 and 1960. Named by ANCA for J.W. Beck, assistant cook at Mawson Station in 1964 and storeman at Wilkes Station in 1966.
- Mount Bensley (70°19′S 64°15′E) is a mountain, 1,920 m, standing 8.5 nautical miles (15.7 km) south-southwest of Mount Starlight. Mapped from ANARE surveys and air photos, 1955–65. Named by ANCA for P.A. Bensley, carpenter at Mawson Station, 1965.
- Mount Bloomfield is a low, domed, boulder-covered mountain 5 nautical miles (9.3 km) west of Mount Rymill in the southern Prince Charles Mountains. Mapped from air photos taken by ANARE in 1956. Named by ANCA for Flight Lieutenant Edward C. Bloomfield, RAAF, navigator with the Antarctic Flight at Mawson Station, 1960.
- Mount Browne-Cooper (70°42′S 64°12′E) is a partly ice-covered mountain 1 nautical mile (2 km) southwest of Mount Forecast, surmounting the south end of Bennett Escarpment. It was mapped from ANARE surveys and air photos, 1956–65, and named by ANCA for P.J. Browne-Cooper, geophysicist at Wilkes Station, 1965.
- Mount Cameron (71°20′S 66°30′E) is a small mountain about 5 nautical miles (9.3 km) south of Mount Woinarski. Plotted from ANARE air photos taken in 1956 and 1960. Named by ANCA for Dr. A. S. Cameron, medical officer at Mawson Station in 1965.
- Mount Cresswell is a domed, elongated mountain with a small conical peak at the west end, standing 25 nautical miles (46 km) north-northeast of Mount Dummett in the southern Prince Charles Mountains. It was mapped from ANARE air photos taken in 1956 and named by ANCA for George Robert Cresswell, an auroral physicist at Mawson Station in 1960.
- Mount Dummett (73°11′S 64°1′E) is an elongated mountain 11 nautical miles (20 km) east of Mount McCauley in the southern Prince Charles Mountains. It was plotted from air photos taken by ANARE in 1956, and was named by ANCA for R.B. Dummett, formerly Managing Director of BP Australia, in recognition of the valuable assistance given to ANARE by the company.
- Mount Forecast (70°40′S 64°18′E) is a large mountain comprising several peaks, standing just northeast of Mount Browne-Cooper and 12.5 nautical miles (23 km) southwest of Mount Pollard. It was napped from ANARE surveys and air photos, 1956–65, and was named by ANCA for M.J. Forecast, a weather observer at Wilkes Station, 1965.
- Mount Gleeson (71°15′S 66°9′E) is a mountain peak with a rock ridge extending southeast for 2 nautical miles (4 km), situated about 6 nautical miles (11 km) west of Mount Woinarski. It was plotted from ANARE air photos taken in 1956 and 1960, and was named by ANCA for T.K. Gleeson, a weather observer at Wilkes Station in 1965.
- Mount Hayne (70°16′S 65°2′E) is a mountain 2 nautical miles (4 km) northwest of Moore Pyramid on the north side of Scylla Glacier. It was plotted from ANARE air photos of 1965, and was named by ANCA for J.R. Hayne, a photographic officer with the Antarctic Division, Melbourne, and a member of the Prince Charles Mountains survey party in 1969.
- Mount Hicks (71°8′S 64°39′E) is a ridgelike mountain with two peaks, about 12 nautical miles (22 km) southwest of Husky Massif. It was plotted from ANARE air photos taken in 1960, and was named for Dr. K.E. Hicks, a medical officer at Wilkes Station in 1963 and 1965.
- Mount Lanyon (71°15′S 67°10′E) is a large mountain about 11 nautical miles (20 km) south of Taylor Platform. The mountain is divided in the south by a small, plateau-fed glacier and an area of moraine extends eastward from the mountain for 8 nautical miles (15 km). It was plotted from ANARE air photos of 1956 and 1960, and was named by ANCA for J.H. Lanyon, officer in charge at Wilkes Station in 1965.
- Mount Lugg is a partly snow-covered mountain 5 nautical miles (9 km) south of Mount Hicks. It was photographed from the Mount Willing and Mount Hicks geodetic stations in 1971 during the ANARE Prince Charles Mountains survey. The mountain was named by ANCA for Dr. D. Lugg, senior medical officer with the Antarctic Division, Melbourne, and Officer in Charge of ANARE Prince Charles Mountains surveys in 1970 and 1971.
- Mount Mather (73°34′S 61°0′E) is a peak 3.5 nautical miles (6 km) west of Mount Menzies. It was sighted by Flying Officer J. Seaton from ANARE aircraft in 1956, and was mapped by an ANARE seismic party of 1957–58 led by Keith B. Mather, for whom it is named.
- Mount McCauley (73°12′S 63°15′E) is a prominent mountain between Mount Scherger and Mount Dummett on the north side of Fisher Glacier. It was discovered from ANARE aircraft in 1956 and visited by an ANARE party in 1960. It was named by ANCA for Air Marshal Sir John McCauley, Chief of the Australian Air Staff, 1954–57.
- Mount Meredith (71°12′S 67°45′E) is a fairly massive, almost flat-topped mountain standing 10 nautical miles (19 km) north of Fisher Massif. It was photographed from ANARE aircraft in 1956 and 1957, and was named by ANCA for Sergeant N. Meredith, RAAF, an engine fitter at Mawson Station in 1957. In 2013, geologists found evidence of kimberlite on Mount Meredith, which may indicate the presence of diamonds that could be mined if Antarctica were opened up for mineral exploitation.
- Mount Reu (71°9′S 65°35′E) is a partly snow-covered mountain about 18 nautical miles (33 km) east of Mount Hicks. Plotted from ANARE air photos taken in 1960. Named for R.N. Reu, radio officer at Wilkes Station in 1962.
- Mount Rubin (73°25′S 65°40′E) is a large, gently domed mountain, with a long tail of moraine trending east, standing 16 nautical miles (30 km) west-northwest of Cumpston Massif. Photographed from the air by ANARE, 1956–58. Named by ANCA for American meteorologist Morton J. Rubin, U.S. Exchange Scientist to the Soviet Mirny Station during 1958; member of the U.S. Advisory Committee on Antarctic Names, 1973–74.
- Mount Ruker (73°40′S 64°30′E) is a large, dark mountain just southwest of Mount Rubin. Plotted from air photos taken by ANARE in 1956. Named by ANCA for Richard Anthony Ruker, geologist at Mawson Station, 1960.
- Mount Scherger (73°13′S 62°55′E) is a peak just west of Mount McCauley in the southern Prince Charles Mountains. Mapped from air photos and surveys, 1956–57, by ANARE. Named by ANCA for Air Marshal Sir Frederick Scherger, Chief of the Air Staff in Australia, 1957–61.
- Mount Thomas (71°1′S 64°36′E) is a mainly snow-covered mountain about 7 nautical miles (13 km) north of Mount Hicks. It has a domed appearance, with a ridge easterly to a small peak. Plotted from ANARE air photos taken in 1960. It was named for I.N. Thomas, radio officer at Wilkes Station in 1963.
- Mount Trott is a ridgelike mountain with a jagged, saw-tooth appearance, about 1 nautical mile (1.9 km) north of Mount Bunt. Plotted from ANARE air photos taken in 1956 and 1960. Named by ANCA for N.E. Trott, weather observer at Wilkes Station in 1962, and officer in charge at Davis Station in 1964.
- Mount Turnbull is a partly snow-covered mountain, 1,980 m, standing 12 nautical miles (22 km) southwest of Mount Starlight. Mapped from ANARE surveys and air photos, 1955–65. Named by ANCA for W.L. Turnbull, radio supervisor at Mawson Station, 1965.
- Mount Wishart (70°19′S 65°15′E) is a snow-covered mountain 5 nautical miles (9.3 km) north of Mount Kirkby, on the north side of Scylla Glacier. Plotted from ANARE air photos. It is named for E. R. Wishart, technical officer (glaciology) at Mawson Station in 1963.
- Mount Woinarski (71°14′S 66°30′E) is a triple-peaked mountain about 18 nautical miles (33 km) southwest of Taylor Platform. Plotted from ANARE air photos taken in 1956 and 1960. Named by ANCA for B.C.Z. Woinarski, officer in charge at Mawson Station in 1965.
- Pardoe Peak (73°29′S 61°38′E) is the summit of the southwest part of the Mount Menzies massif, located about 3.5 nautical miles (6.5 km) southwest of the summit of Mount Menzies. Plotted from ANARE air photos and surveys, 1957–61. Named by ANCA for Dr. R. Pardoe, medical officer at Mawson Station, 1961.
- Scanlan Peak (71°5′S 65°23′E) is the southernmost of a group of three peaks about 5 nautical miles (9.3 km) southeast of Husky Massif. Plotted from ANARE air photos taken in 1960. Named for A.M. Scanlan, cook at Davis Station in 1961.
- Vrana Peak (70°22′S 63°59′E) is a peak just southwest of Mount Turnbull and 14 nautical miles (26 km) southwest of Mount Starlight. Mapped from ANARE surveys and air photos, 1955–65. Named by ANCA for A. Vrana, physicist at Mawson Station, 1965.
- Wall Peak (71°3′S 65°23′E) is the largest and northernmost of three sharply defined peaks about 5 nautical miles (9.3 km) southeast of Husky Massif Plotted from ANARE air photos taken in 1960. Named for B.H. Wall, ionosphere physicist at Wilkes Station in 1960.

=== Massifs ===
- Cumpston Massif is a prominent, flat-topped rock outcrop, about 2,070 metres (6,800 ft) high, 9 miles (14 km) long and 6 miles (10 km) wide, at the junction of Lambert Glacier and Mellor Glacier. It attracts many people. Cumpston Massif was discovered in November 1956, from an ANARE aircraft, and named by ANCA for Dr J. S. Cumpston of the Australian Department of External Affairs who, along with E. P. Bayliss, was responsible for the map of the Antarctic published in 1939 by the Property and Survey Branch, Department of the Interior, Canberra.
- Fisher Massif (72°19′S 67°40′E) is a rock massif about 16 nautical miles (30 km) long and 5 nautical miles (9 km) wide, standing at the west side of Lambert Glacier about 42 nautical miles (78 km) south of the Aramis Range. It was discovered by an ANARE party led by B.H. Stinear in October 1957, and was named by ANCA for Morris M. Fisher, a surveyor at Mawson Station in 1957. The Blustery Cliffs are on the northern part of Fisher Massif, while Mount Johnston is the southernmost and highest of its peaks, at 1,770 metres (5,800 ft).

=== Other Features ===
- The Bennett Escarpment (70°36′S 64°19′E) is a rock and ice escarpment curving in a general southwest direction for 20 nautical miles (37 km) from Mount Pollard. It was mapped from ANARE surveys and air photos, 1956–65, and named by ANCA for J.M. Bennett, a physicist at Mawson Station, 1965.
- The Blustery Cliffs (71°25′S 67°53′E) are a line of rocky cliffs 3.5 nautical miles (6 km) long on the northern part of Fisher Massif. A point on the cliffs 1,135 metres (3,724 ft) high was occupied as a survey station by J. Manning, a surveyor with the ANARE Prince Charles Mountains survey party in January 1969. They are so named because of the great amount of turbulence caused by updraft currents.
- Edwards Pillar (73°5′S 66°20′E) is a large rock pillar on the western face of Mount Stinear. The feature is in the vicinity of a geodetic survey station established by the ANARE Prince Charles Mountains survey party in 1971. It was named for N.F. Edwards, a surveyor with the party.
- O'Keefe Hill (70°20′S 64°24′E) is an isolated ice-covered hill, located 1.5 nautical miles (2.8 km) south of Baldwin Nunatak and 8 nautical miles (15 km) south-southwest of Mount Starlight. Mapped from ANARE air photos, 1965. Named by ANCA for J. O'Keefe, cook at Mawson Station, 1964.
- Nilsson Rocks (71°45′S 67°42′E) are a group of fairly low rock outcrops which enclose a meltwater lake, situated 17 kilometres (9 nmi) south of Fisher Massif in the Prince Charles Mountains. The group was plotted from air photos taken by ANARE aircraft in 1956. They were named by ANCA for C.S. Nilsson, a physicist at Mawson Station in 1957.
- Scylla Glacier (70°20′S 67°0′E) is a large glacier draining eastward between the Athos and Porthos ranges of the Prince Charles Mountains. Discovered in December 1956 by ANARE southern party led by W.G. Bewsher. It was named after Homer's Scylla because of the difficulty in traversing the region due to the glacier.
- Taylor Platform (71°1′S 67°9′E) is a low, fairly flat rock massif about 1 nautical mile (1.9 km) north of Mount Brocklehurst. Plotted from ANARE air photos taken in 1956 and 1960. Named by ANCA for F.J. Taylor, ionosphere physicist at Mawson Station in 1964.

== Notes ==
72°0′S 67°0′E
