= Brunvoll Glacier =

Glacier in Antarctica

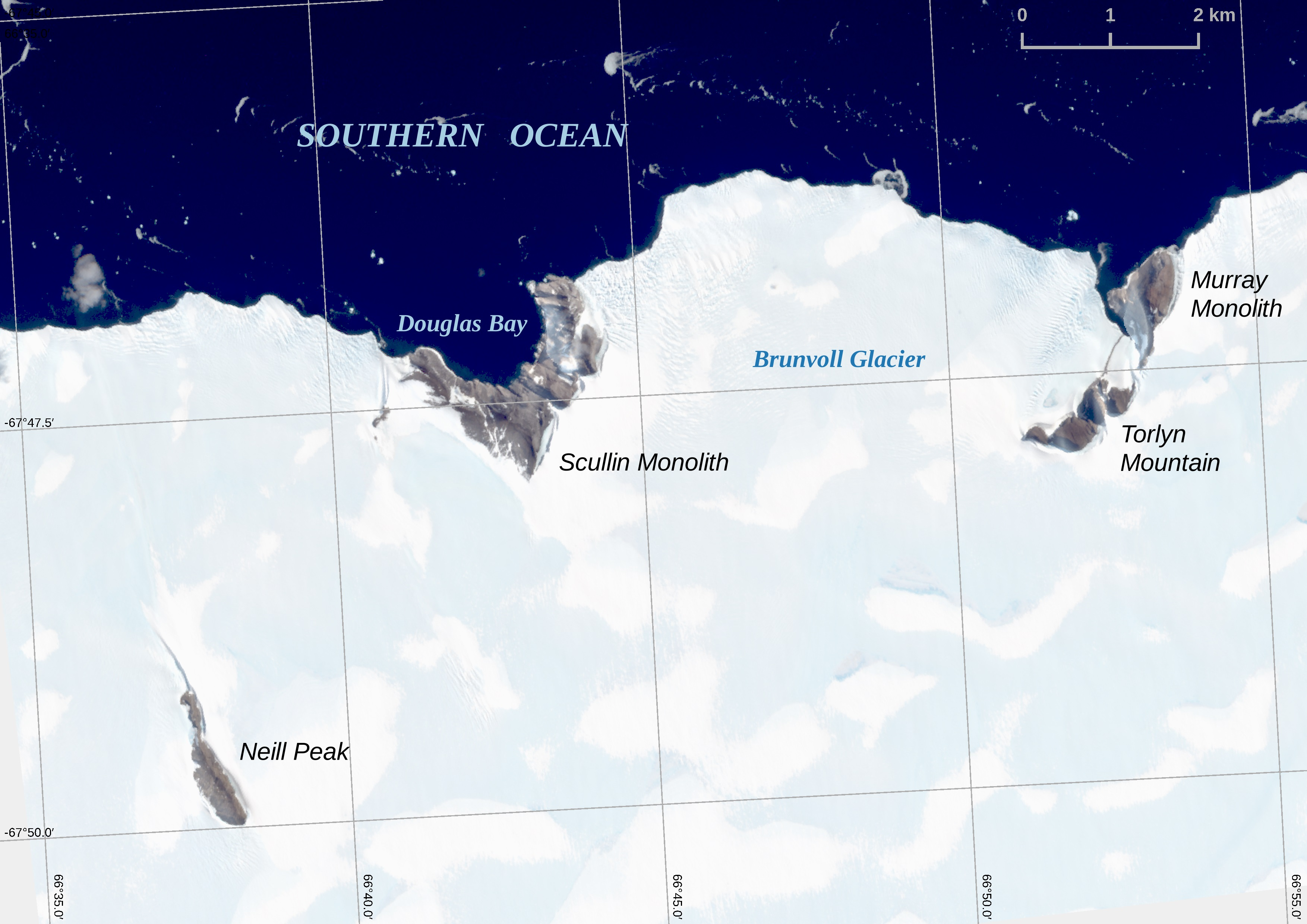
- Brunvoll Glacier (center)

- Location within Antarctica
- Location: Mac. Robertson Land
- Coordinates: 67°48′S 66°48′E
- Thickness: unknown
- Status: unknown

Brunvoll Glacier (67°48′S 66°48′E) is a broad glacier flowing north to the coast between Murray Monolith and Torlyn Mountain on the east and Scullin Monolith and Mikkelsen Peak on the west. The name was suggested by Bjarne Aagaard for the brothers Arnold and Saebjorn Brunvoll, Norwegian whaling captains who explored along this coast in the Seksern in January 1931.

== See also ==
- List of glaciers in the Antarctic
- Glaciology
