= February 1932 =

Month of 1932

<<	February 1932					>>
Su	Mo	Tu	We	Th	Fr	Sa
	1	2	3	4	5	6
7	8	9	10	11	12	13
14	15	16	17	18	19	20
21	22	23	24	25	26	27
28	29

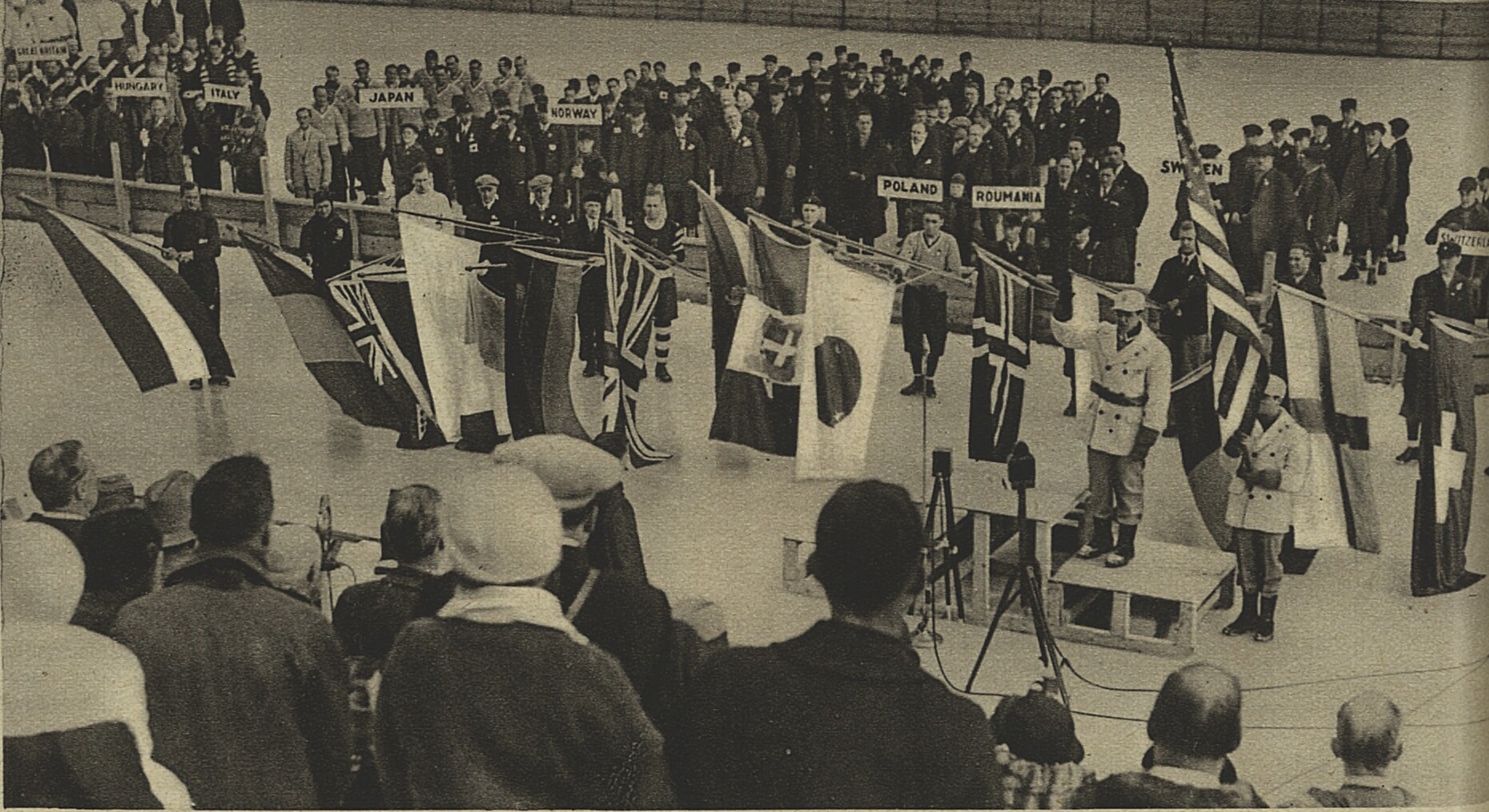
February 4, 1932: Winter Olympic Games opening ceremony in Lake Placid, New York

The following events occurred in February 1932:

== February 1, 1932 (Monday) ==
- Japanese warships bombarded the city of Nanjing.
- Born: Sir John Nott, British Defence Secretary 1981 to 1983; in Bideford, Devon (d. 2024)

== February 2, 1932 (Tuesday) ==
- In Geneva, a disarmament conference attended by representatives of 60 nations opened.
- Chicago mobster Terry Druggan was sentenced to two-and-a-half years in prison and fined $5,000 for tax fraud.
- Duke Ellington and his orchestra first recorded the jazz tune "It Don't Mean a Thing (If It Ain't Got That Swing)".
- World War flying ace Wop May was hired to assist in the manhunt for the fugitive Albert Johnson in Northern Canada. It was the first time a plane had ever been used in Canadian law enforcement.

== February 3, 1932 (Wednesday) ==
- It came to light that Adolf Hitler may be a German citizen after all, which would make him eligible to run for president. It was revealed that in 1930, Thuringian Interior Minister Wilhelm Frick had appointed Hitler as police commissioner of the town of Hildburghausen. According to law, a German official automatically became a citizen. Hitler downplayed the revelation, saying he had refused the appointment and that "these are not the means by which I expect to become a German citizen."
- Born: Peggy Ann Garner, American child actress in film; in Canton, Ohio (died from pancreatic cancer, 1984)

== February 4, 1932 (Thursday) ==
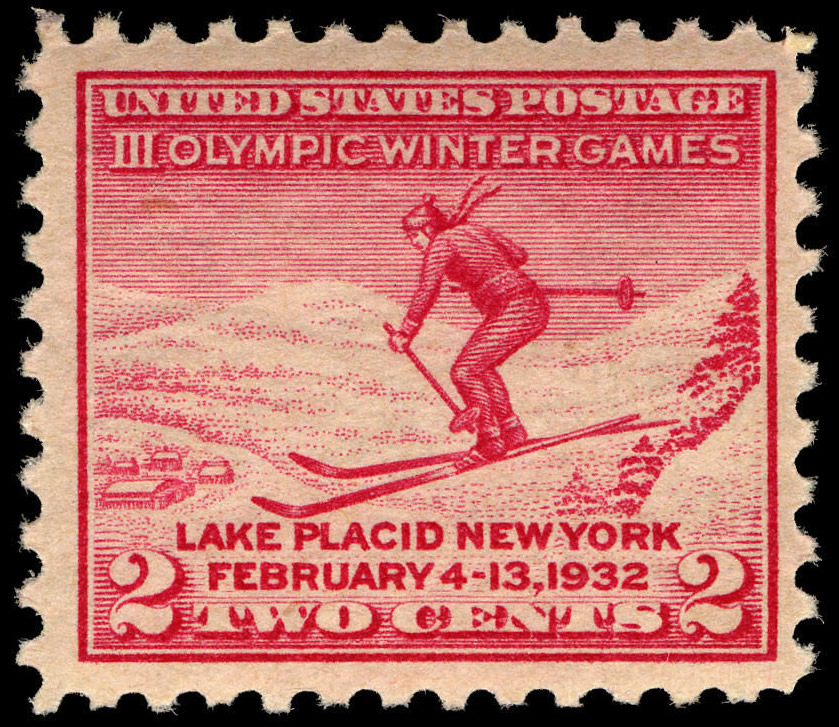

- The III Olympic Winter Games opened in Lake Placid, New York, with seventeen nations participating.
- Chancellor of the Exchequer Neville Chamberlain introduced the Import Duties Bill, a 10% tariff on imports, with exceptions for concessions for the Empire.
- The Aldous Huxley dystopian science fiction novel Brave New World was published, with a setting more than 600 years in the future.
- Born: Gordon Brown, Scottish footballer; in Dunfermline, Fife (d. 1999)

== February 5, 1932 (Friday) ==
- Latvia and the Soviet Union signed a non-aggression pact.
- Mahatma Gandhi's spinning wheel, along with a few other items, were seized by the government for nonpayment of taxes.
- In Indian River, Florida, Garfield Wood set a new boat speed record of 111.72 mph in the Miss America IX.
- Died: Barney Dreyfuss, 66, German-born American baseball executive and owner of the Pittsburgh Pirates; in 1903, he negotiated the agreement that made peace between the National League and the rival American League, with agreements not to raid each other's teams, and creating a post season World Series; enshrined in the National Baseball Hall of Fame 2008

== February 6, 1932 (Saturday) ==
- American soldiers arrived in Shanghai.
- The comedy film The Passionate Plumber starring Buster Keaton and Jimmy Durante was released.
- Born: François Truffaut, French film director; in Paris (died of brain tumor, 1984)
- Died: Augusto B. Leguía, 68, President of Peru 1908 to 1912 and 1919 to 1930, died while in confinement following his 1930 overthrow.

== February 7, 1932 (Sunday) ==
- Denmark, Norway, Sweden, Belgium, Luxembourg and the Netherlands signed the Oslo Convention, an economic cooperation plan.
- Al Smith announced he was running for President of the United States again.
- Born: Gay Talese, American freelance journalist; in Ocean City, New Jersey

== February 8, 1932 (Monday) ==
- The Bulgarian government officially announced that it would not make any more war reparations payments.
- The jury in the Winnie Ruth Judd case found her guilty of first degree murder and voted for the death penalty.

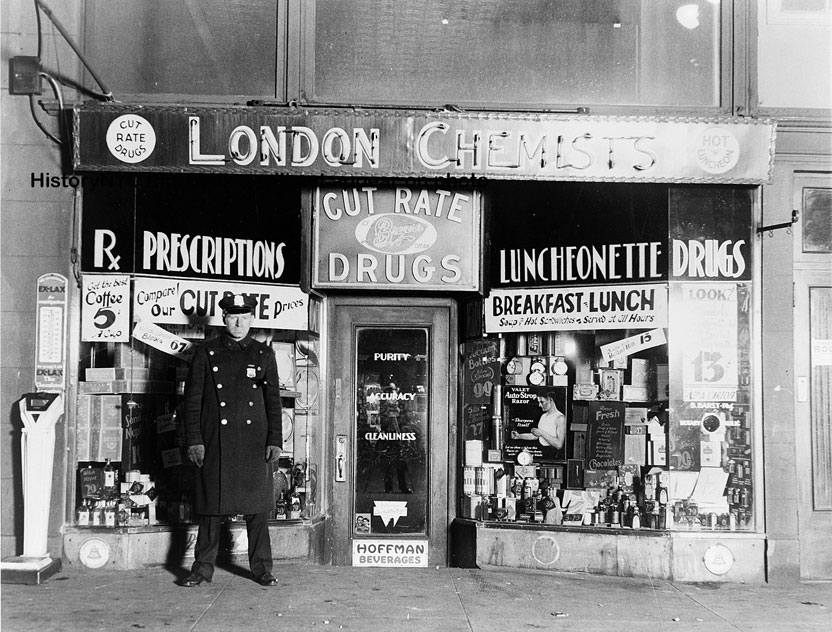
The site of Coll's killing

- Born:
  - John Williams, American filmscore composer and conductor, winner of 25 Grammy Awards and five Academy Awards; in Queens, New York
  - Jean Innes Saunders, English romance novelist who wrote under her own name (as Jean Saunders and as Jean Innes) and under numerous pen names, including "Rowena Summers"; in London (d. 2011);
- Died:
  - Vincent "Mad Dog" Coll, 23, Irish-born American gangster, was shot to death by a rival gang while in a phone booth in Manhattan.
  - Yordan Milanov, 64, Bulgarian architect

== February 9, 1932 (Tuesday) ==
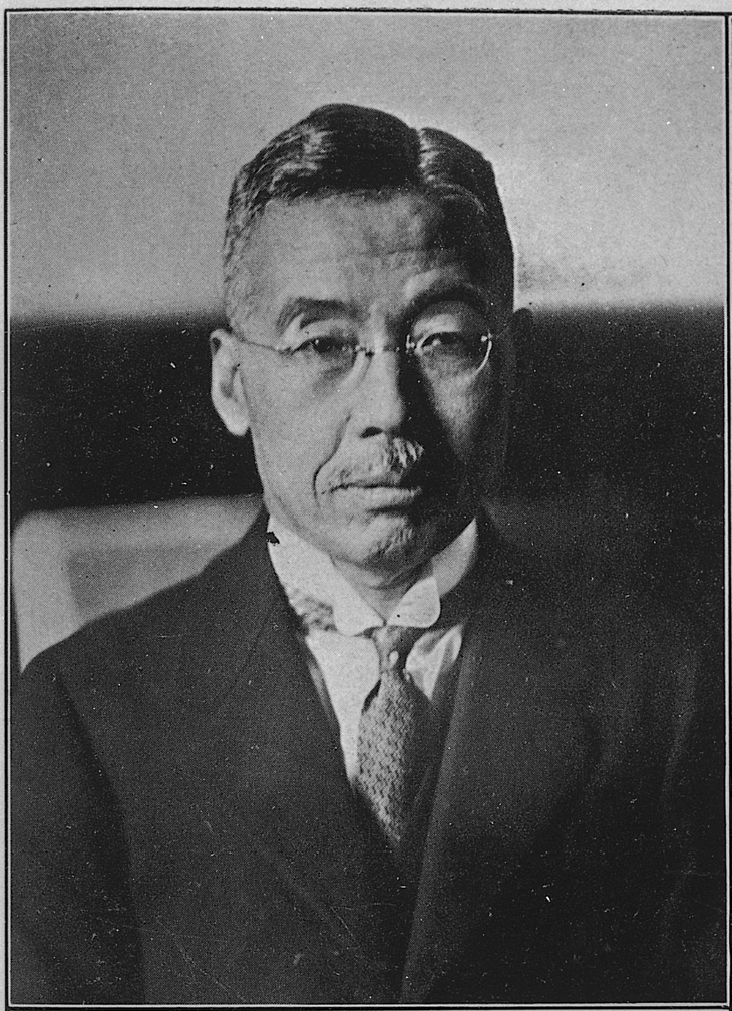
Inoue

- A member of the Ketsumeidan, a Japanese extremist group, shot and killed former Finance Minister Junnosuke Inoue. Inoue had stepped from his car in the evening, preparing to walk into the Hongo Komamoto Primary School where he was scheduled to deliver a speech, when Shō Onuma walked up, pressed a pistol to Inoue's abdomen, and fired three shots.
- The right-wing Army Comrades Association, more commonly referred to as the Blueshirts, was formed in Ireland.
- Born: Gerhard Richter, German artist; in Dresden

== February 10, 1932 (Wednesday) ==
- Winter Legends for piano and orchestra by Arnold Bax was performed for the first time, at Queen's Hall in London.
- Died: Edgar Wallace, 56, English journalist and screenwriter, from complications of diabetes and pleural pneumonia

== February 11, 1932 (Thursday) ==
- On a holiday marking the third anniversary of the Lateran Treaty, Benito Mussolini went to the Vatican and met with Pope Pius XI for the first time. The visit was only expected to last for a few minutes but the two spoke for an hour.
- Born:
  - Margit Carlqvist, Swedish film actress; in Stockholm
  - Jerome Lowenthal, American classical pianist, in Philadelphia
  - Dennis Skinner, British coal-miner who became a Socialist politician, known for 49 years in the House of Commons as the Beast of Bolsover; in Clay Cross, Derbyshire

== February 12, 1932 (Friday) ==
- Pope Pius XI marked the tenth anniversary of his coronation with a speech before thousands in St. Peter's Basilica. He said he hoped that all would be with him in prayers that "the Supreme Lord of all things earthly should cause peace to return to the earth."
- The film Shanghai Express starring Marlene Dietrich was released.
- Born: Julian Simon, U.S. economist and author, known for winning the Simon–Ehrlich wager against Paul R. Ehrlich; in Chevy Chase, Maryland (d. 1998)

== February 13, 1932 (Saturday) ==
- Mount Hinks, Mount Marsden and the Rouse Islands in Antarctica were discovered by the British Australian and New Zealand Antarctic Research Expedition led by Sir Douglas Mawson.
- Born: Susan Oliver (stage name of Charlotte Gercke), American TV actress; in New York City (d. 1990)

== February 14, 1932 (Sunday) ==
- Irish parliament representative Patrick Reynolds and his bodyguard, detective Patrick McGeehan, were both shot when Reynolds was walking door-to-door to campaign for the upcoming election. Reynolds got into an argument with the occupant of one house he visited, Joseph Leddy, a former Royal Irish Constabulary officer, who produced a double-barreled gun and fatally wounded both of them. McGeehan died at the scene and Reynolds died a month later.
- Born: Alexander Kluge, German author and film director; in Halberstadt

== February 15, 1932 (Monday) ==
- At the age of 84, Paul von Hindenburg agreed to run again for President of Germany in the March 13 election. "The appeal to stand for re-election came to me not from a party but from the broad masses of people", Hindenburg said. "Therefore, I recognize it as my duty to stand."
- The Winter Olympics in Lake Placid closed. The United States won the medal count with 6 gold medals and 12 overall.
- The U.S. Supreme Court decided Blackmer v. United States, holding that U.S. jurisdiction applies overseas to a U.S. citizen who has failed to appear at an American court. The Court upheld a $30,000 fine levied against Harry M. Blackmer, who had been living in France when he was subpoenaed to appear at a federal trial.

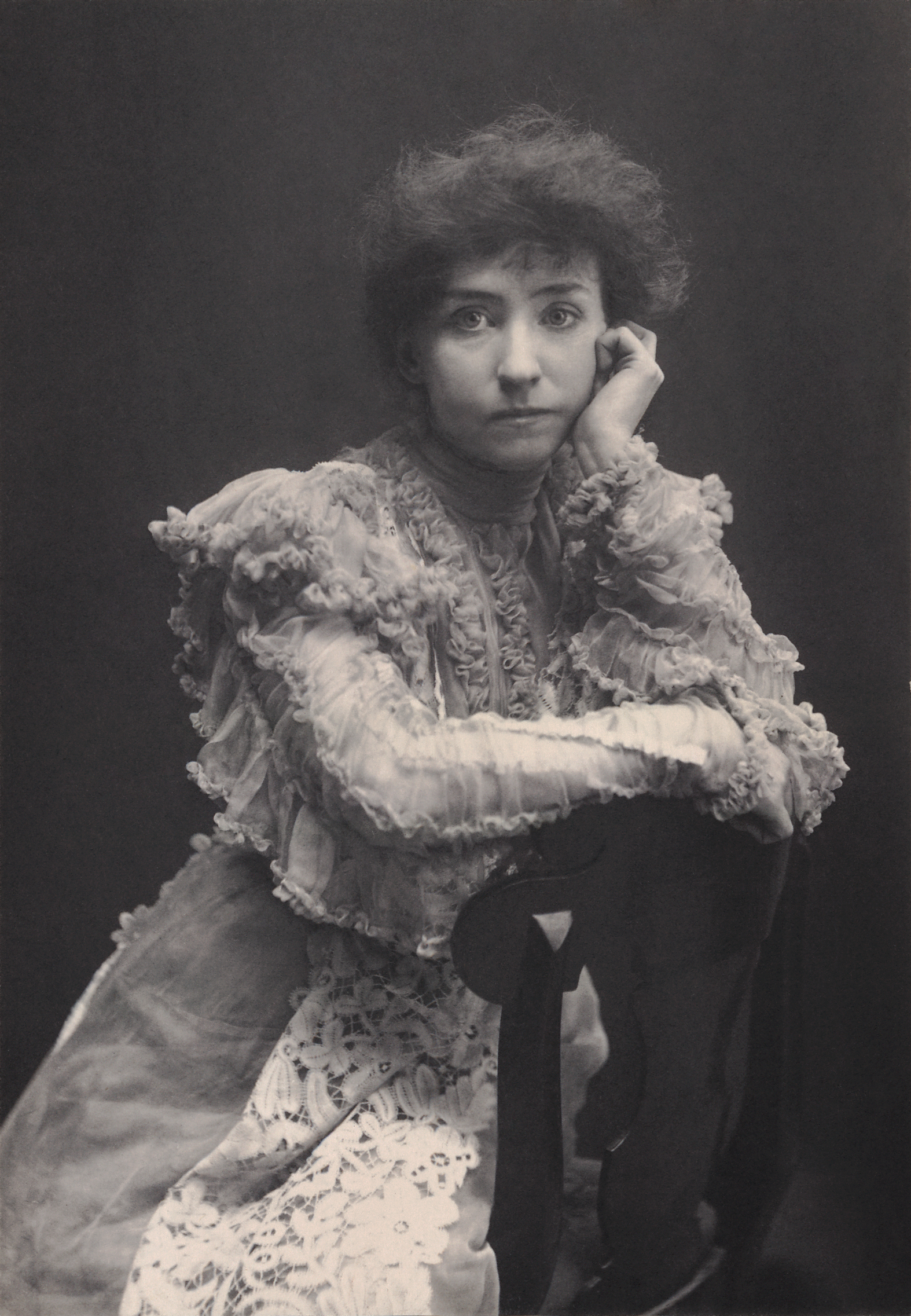
Mrs. Fiske at 41

- Died: Minnie Maddern Fiske, 66, American stage actress

== February 16, 1932 (Tuesday) ==
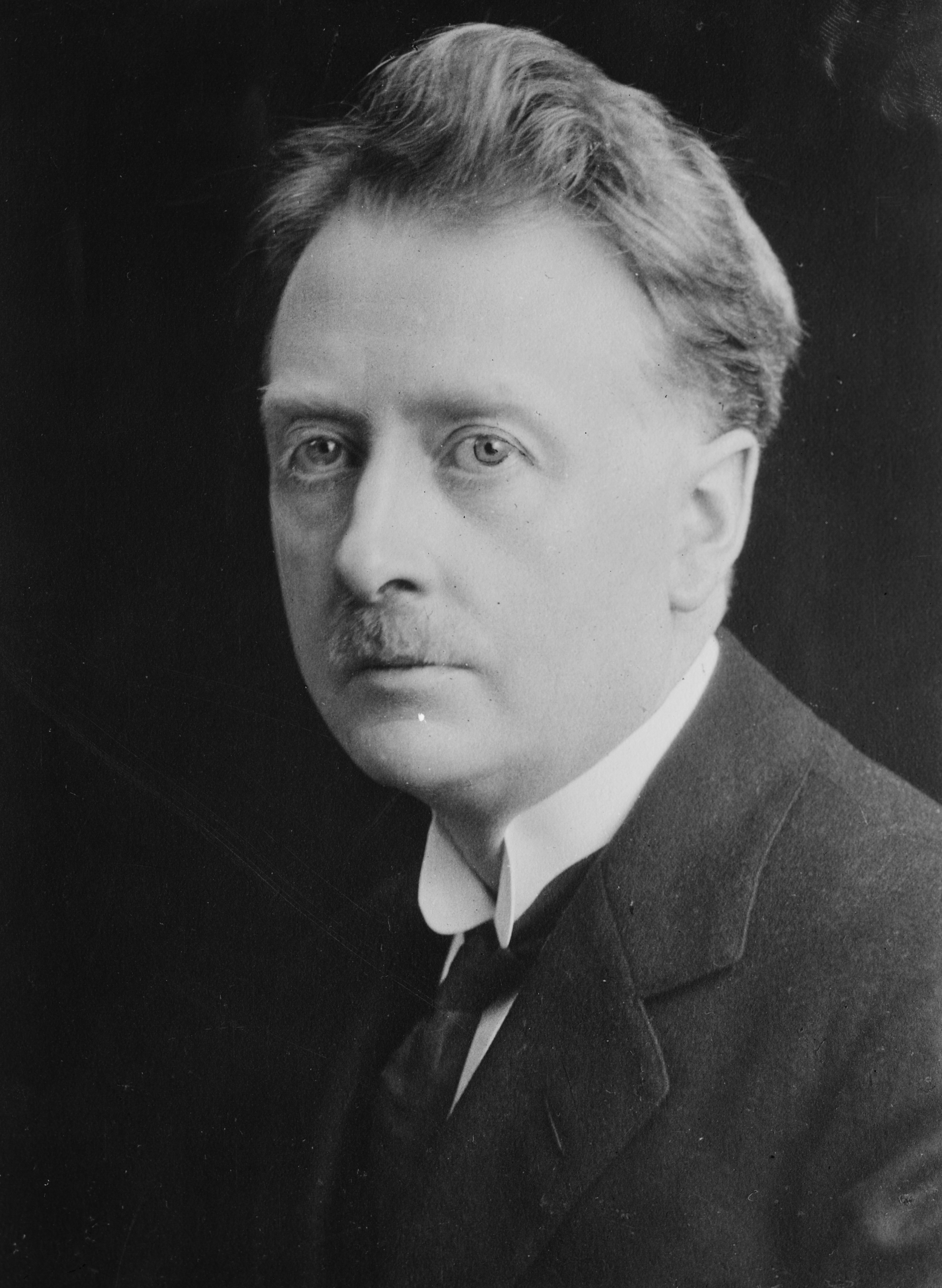
Cosgrave

- The Fianna Fáil party, led by Éamon de Valera, won the Irish general election, winning control of the Irish Free State's parliament, the 153-seat Dáil Éireann, by capturing 72 seats. The Cumann na nGaedheal, led by W. T. Cosgrave, had a narrow 65 to 57 seats lead over Fianna Fáil prior to the election and lost 8 of their seats, forcing Cosgrave to step down as leader of the government. The victory would mark the start of almost 80 years of control of the government by Fianna Fáil, lasting until 2011
- Born:
  - Ahmad Tejan Kabbah, President of Sierra Leone from 1996 to 1997 and 1998 to 2007; in Pendembu (d. 2014)
  - Harry Goz, American musical theater actor known for starring in Fiddler on the Roof on Broadway; in St. Louis (d. 2003)
  - Antonio Ordóñez, Spanish bullfighter; in Ronda (d. 1998)
  - Gretchen Wyler, American stage actress and animal protection advocate; in Oklahoma City, Oklahoma (d. 2007)
- Died:
  - Ferdinand Buisson, 90, French academic, pacifist and politician, 1927 Nobel Peace Prize laureate
  - Edgar Speyer, 69, American-born British financier and philanthropist

== February 17, 1932 (Wednesday) ==
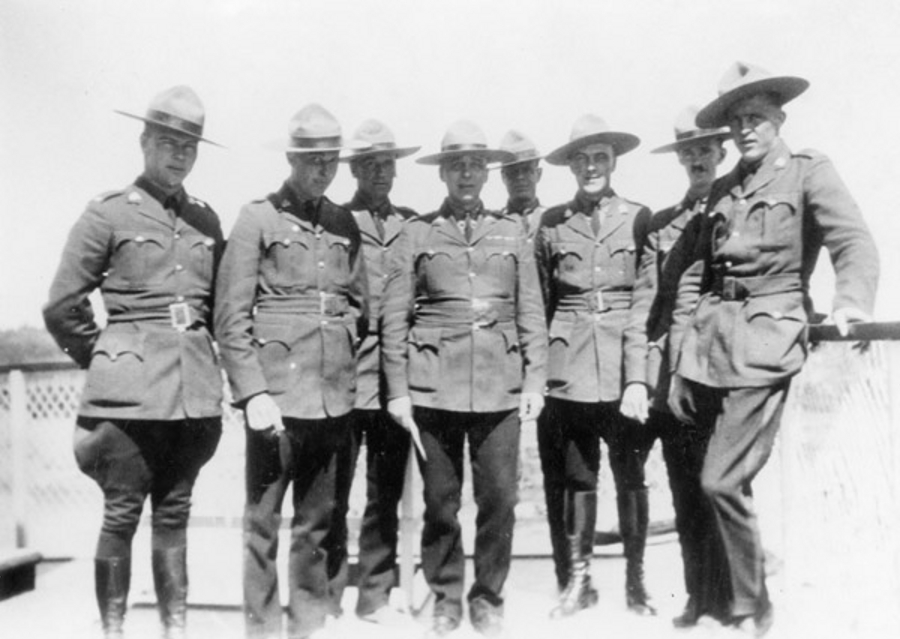
The Mounties who caught the Mad Trapper

- Over a month after the manhunt for Albert Johnson, "The Mad Trapper", began, the posse caught up with him and finally killed him in a shootout. An officer was seriously wounded, but survived. The case thrilled the public and popularized the saying "the Mounties always get their man".

== February 18, 1932 (Thursday) ==
Flag of the "Republic of Manchukuo"

- Following its invasion and occupation of Manchuria, Japan proclaimed the creation of a puppet state, the Republic of Manchukuo out of the three provinces of northeastern China (Liaoning, Jilin and Heilongjiang) that comprised Manchuria. A month later, Japan would install former Emperor of China Aisin-Gioro Puyi as the new republic's head of state in the Manchukoan capital, Changchun, in the Jilin Province and rename the city "Xinjing".
- Born: Miloš Forman, Czech-American film director, 1976 Academy Award winner for One Flew Over the Cuckoo's Nest; in Čáslav (d. 2018)
- Died: Frederick Augustus III, 66, the last King of Saxony (from 1904 to 1918). His second son, Friedrich Christian, became the new head of the House of Wettin and revived the title of Margrave of Meissen for himself, though not making a claim of to a throne.

== February 19, 1932 (Friday) ==
- The British government established an emergency "council of action" with full powers to take any measures deemed necessary to protect British interests in Shanghai.
- Symphonic Ode by Aaron Copland was performed for the first time in Boston's Symphony Hall.

== February 20, 1932 (Saturday) ==
- Elections were held for the 466-seat Japanese House of Representatives, and marked a decisive victory for the Rikken Seiyūkai of Prime Minister Inukai Tsuyoshi, won 127 seats formerly held by the rival Rikken Minseitō. Seiyūkai won a 301 to 146 control over Minseitō, which had a 273 to 174 advantage before the vote.
- Major General Agustín Pedro Justo, who had won the November 8 presidential election, was inaugurated to a six-year term as the new President of Argentina.

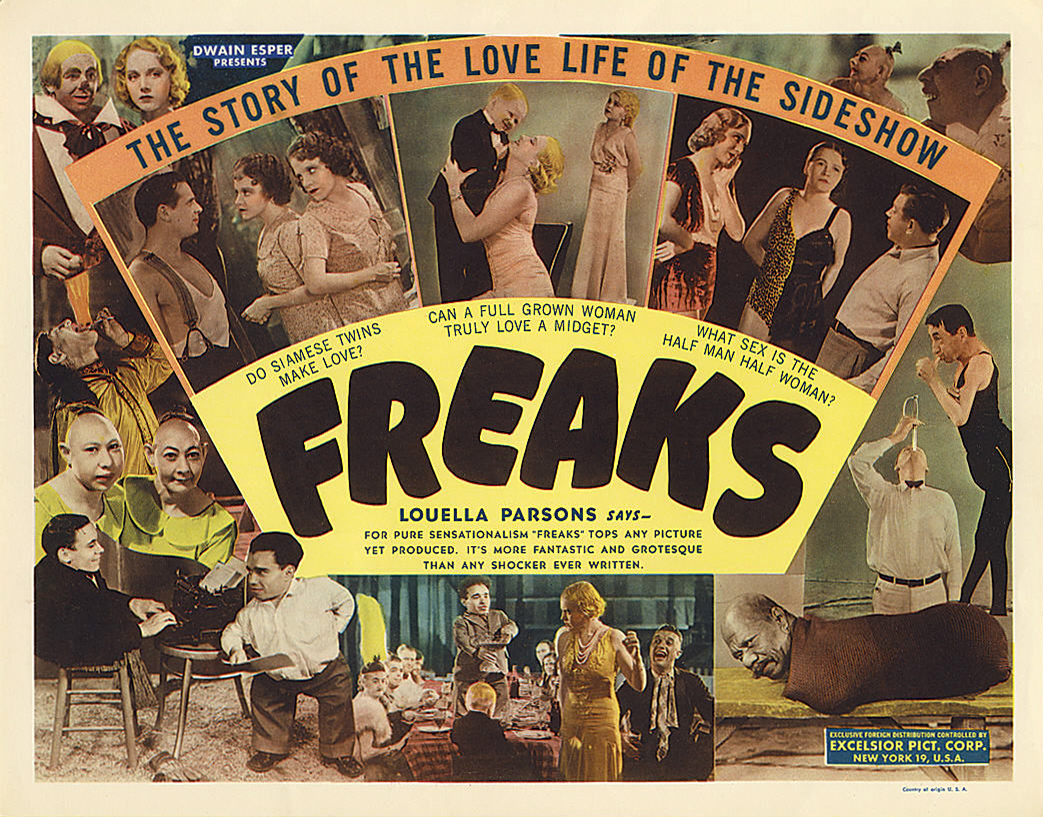
The theater lobby card for Freaks

- The controversial horror film Freaks, produced and directed by Tod Browning, was released. It featured well-known actors Wallace Ford and Leila Hyams, supported by a cast of carnival sideshow performers with physical deformities, who had earned a living by appearing before the public in traveling shows. Though unpopular and widely criticized at the time as insensitive, and even banned in the United Kingdom for its scenes of horror (with Hyams's character being brutally mutilated at the film's end), Freaks would receive critical reappraisal 30 years later and become a cult classic; in 1994, it would be selected by the U.S. National Film Registry for preservation as being culturally significant.
- Born: Adrian Cristobal, Philippine newspaper columnist and playwright (d. 2007)

== February 21, 1932 (Sunday) ==
- André Tardieu became Prime Minister of France for the third time.
- Leon Trotsky and 36 other opponents of Joseph Stalin were officially banished from the Soviet Union "for all time". Trotsky and his family, who had been deported to Turkey in 1929, were stripped of their Soviet citizenship. He eventually settled in Mexico, where he was assassinated in 1940.

== February 22, 1932 (Monday) ==
- The bicentennial of George Washington's Birthday was observed in the United States. U.S. President Herbert Hoover addressed a joint session of Congress opening celebrations that were to continue through Thanksgiving Day. "The true eulogy of Washington is this mighty nation," Hoover said, adding "He contributed more to its origins than any other man. The influence of his character and of his accomplishments has contributed to the building of human freedom and ordered liberty, not alone upon this continent but upon all continents." John Philip Sousa conducted the combined band of the Army, Navy and Marine Corps in front of the United States Capitol in the first performance of Sousa's George Washington Bicentennial March.
  - The George Washington Memorial Bridge was dedicated in Seattle.
- At a Nazi rally in the Berlin Sportpalast, Joseph Goebbels announced that Adolf Hitler would be a candidate for President of Germany. Hitler, who was not present at the rally, still needed to establish German citizenship before the March 13 election in that he had been born in Austria.
- Born:
  - Ted Kennedy, U.S. Senator for Massachusetts from 1962 to 2009; in Boston (d. 2009)
  - Robert Opron, French automotive designer for Citroën from 1964 to 2001; in Amiens (d. 2021)
- Died: Johanna Gadski, 60, German-born American soprano, was killed in a car accident while visiting Berlin

== February 23, 1932 (Tuesday) ==
- In Germany, Danatbank, which had collapsed in July 1931, was taken over by Dresdner Bank.
- The National Police Gazette magazine ceased publication because of bankruptcy. Three months later it was purchased and publication resumed under different ownership.
- The U.S. Supreme Court decided Crowell v. Benson, which upheld the authority of federal administrative agencies to make binding legal rulings. The Court rejected claims that authority conferred by the Legislative Branch (Congress) on agencies in the Executive Branch did not violate the Separation of Powers requirement of the U.S. Constitution, and that rulings by such agencies after hearings did not violate the Due Process Clause.
- Born:
  - Majel Barrett, American TV actress and producer known for her portrayal of various characters in the Star Trek franchise of TV series and films, and as the wife (after the original series ended) of Gene Roddenberry; as Majel Leigh Hudec in Cleveland (d. 2008)
  - Bill Bonds, American news anchor for evening news in Los Angeles, New York and Detroit from 1968 to 1995; in Detroit (d. 2014)

== February 24, 1932 (Wednesday) ==
- Brazil gave women the right to vote.

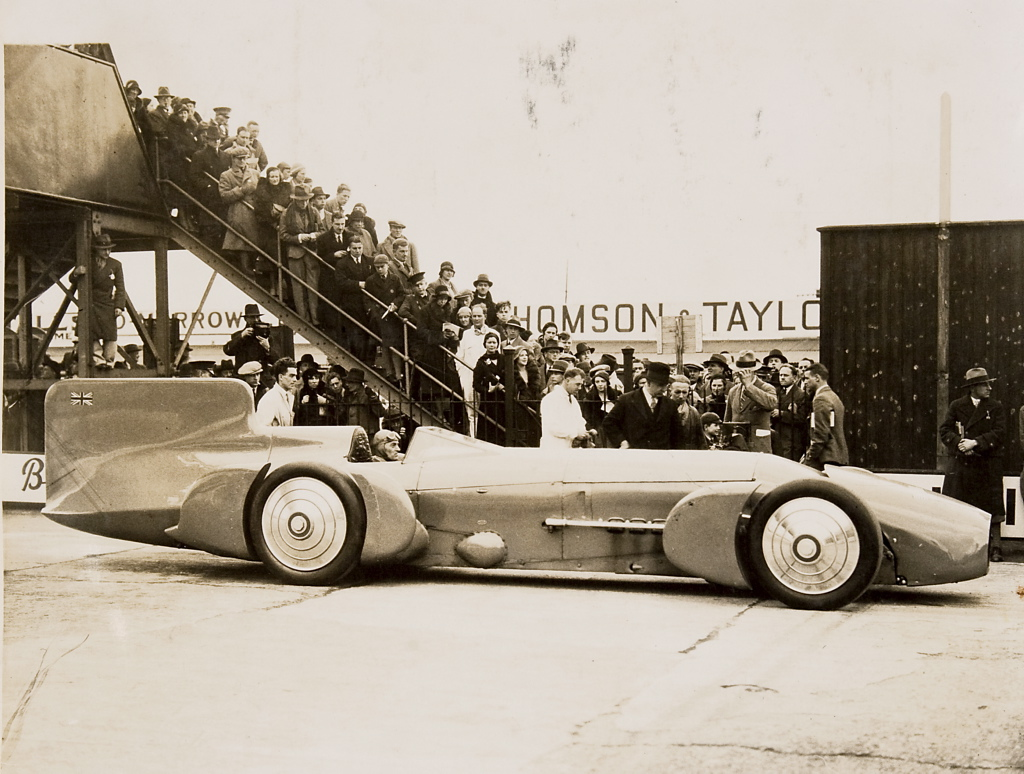
Campbell in The Blue Bird

- Sir Malcolm Campbell broke his own land speed world record, attaining 253.96 miles per hour (408.71 km/h) in his Blue Bird at Daytona Beach.
- Born: Michel Legrand, French composer, winner of three Academy Awards and five Grammy Awards; in Bécon les Bruyères (d. 2019)

== February 25, 1932 (Thursday) ==
- Adolf Hitler was appointed a senior executive officer in the Free State of Brunswick by Interior Minister Dietrich Klagges, therefore making him a German citizen and eligible to run for president.
- The Shanghai Expeditionary Army was raised.
- Born: Faron Young, American country music singer and songwriter; in Shreveport, Louisiana (d. 1996)
- Died: Julieta Lanteri, 58, Italian-born Argentine physician and feminist, died two days after being struck by a hit-and-run driver while walking in Buenos Aires.

== February 26, 1932 (Friday) ==
- The Nazi Party and DNVP made a renewed attempt to bring down the government of German Chancellor Heinrich Brüning on a motion of no confidence in the Reichstag, but the motion failed with 264 opposing and 289 approving the government. The Nazi members then walked out of parliament, and the Communist Party introduced a motion to stop payment of federal subsidies to Brunswick for "plotting against the republic with the Nazis." The motion was passed.
- The Spanish Cortes Generales passed a bill on second reading allowing divorce.
- Born: Johnny Cash, American country music singer and songwriter known as "The Man in Black"; as J. R. Cash in Kingsland, Arkansas (d. 2003)

== February 27, 1932 (Saturday) ==
- Al Capone lost his appeal of his tax fraud conviction and prepared to go to prison.
- In Washington, John Philip Sousa conducted the U.S. Marine Band in his "Hands Across the Sea" march. It proved to be Sousa's final performance.
- Born: Elizabeth Taylor, English-born American film actress; in Hampstead Garden Suburb, London (d. 2011)

== February 28, 1932 (Sunday) ==
- Clarence Darrow agreed to come out of retirement to represent the defendants in the Massie case.
- Born: Don Francks, Canadian actor and jazz musician; in Vancouver (d. 2016)

== February 29, 1932 (Monday) ==
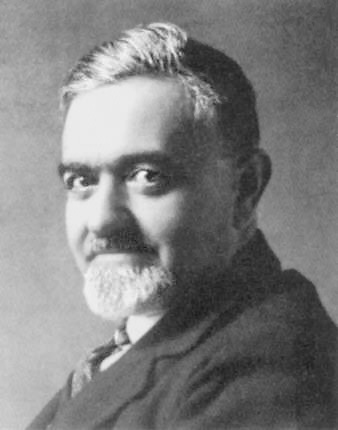
Vitali

- At Mäntsälä, Finnish government troops clashed with about 5,000 members of the Lapua Movement who were trying to march on Helsinki. The government passed an emergency decree giving Pehr Evind Svinhufvud broad powers to deal with the rebellion.
- The George Bernard Shaw play Too True to Be Good premiered at the Colonial Theatre in Boston.
- Died: Giuseppe Vitali, 56, Italian mathematician whose name is associated with the Vitali convergence theorem and the Vitali set, from a heart attack after completing a lecture at the University of Bologna
