= Mount Hinks =

Rock peak in Antarctica

Mount Hinks (67°53′S 66°3′E) is a rock peak, 595 metres (1,950 ft) high, rising 0.2 nautical miles (0.4 km) south of Mount Marsden in the Gustav Bull Mountains of Mac. Robertson Land, Antarctica. On 13 February 1931, the British Australian New Zealand Antarctic Research Expedition (1929–31) under Douglas Mawson made a landing on nearby Scullin Monolith. They named this peak after Arthur R. Hinks, Secretary of the Royal Geographical Society, 1915–45.
