= Lawson Aiguilles =

Line of sharp peaks in Mac. Robertson Land, Antarctica

The Lawson Aiguilles (67°50′S 66°15′E) are a line of sharp peaks in the south part of Mount Rivett, in the Gustav Bull Mountains of Mac. Robertson Land, Antarctica. Peaks in this group were included in Australian National Antarctic Research Expedition surveys of 1962 and 1967. The aiguilles were named by the Antarctic Names Committee of Australia for E. J. Lawson, a diesel mechanic at Mawson Station who assisted with the survey work in 1967.
