= Frustration (disambiguation) =

Frustration is an emotional response. It may also refer to:

- Frustration of purpose, in contract law
- Frustration Ridge, Churchill Mountains, Antarctica
- Frustration Dome, Mac. Robertson Land, Antarctica
- Geometrical frustration, in mathematics and physics
- Frustration (solitaire), a single-player card game
- Frustration!, a board game
- "Frustration", a song by Lou Reed and Metallica from Lulu
- "Frustration", a song by Soft Cell from Non-Stop Erotic Cabaret
