= Mount Rivett =

Bare rock mountain in Antarctica

Mount Rivett (67°50′S 66°14′E) is a bare rock mountain, the northeasternmost feature of the Gustav Bull Mountains in Mac. Robertson Land, Antarctica. On February 13, 1931, the British Australian New Zealand Antarctic Research Expedition (BANZARE) (1929–31) under Douglas Mawson made a landing on nearby Scullin Monolith. They named this mountain after Sir David Rivett, Deputy Chairman and Chief Executive Officer of the Australian Council for Scientific and Industrial Research, 1927–45.

== See also ==
Lawson Aiguilles, a line of sharp peaks in the south part of Mount Rivett
