= Mount Kjerka =

Mountain in Antarctica

Mount Kjerka (68°3′S 66°4′E) is a mountain, 865 metres (2,840 ft) high, at the south end of the Gustav Bull Mountains, 11 nautical miles (20 km) south of Mount Marsden, in Mac. Robertson Land, Antarctica. It was mapped by Norwegian cartographers from aerial photographs taken by the Lars Christensen Expedition (1936–37) and named Kjerka (the church).
