= March 1932 =

Month in 1932

<<	March 1932					>>
Su	Mo	Tu	We	Th	Fr	Sa
		1	2	3	4	5
6	7	8	9	10	11	12
13	14	15	16	17	18	19
20	21	22	23	24	25	26
27	28	29	30	31

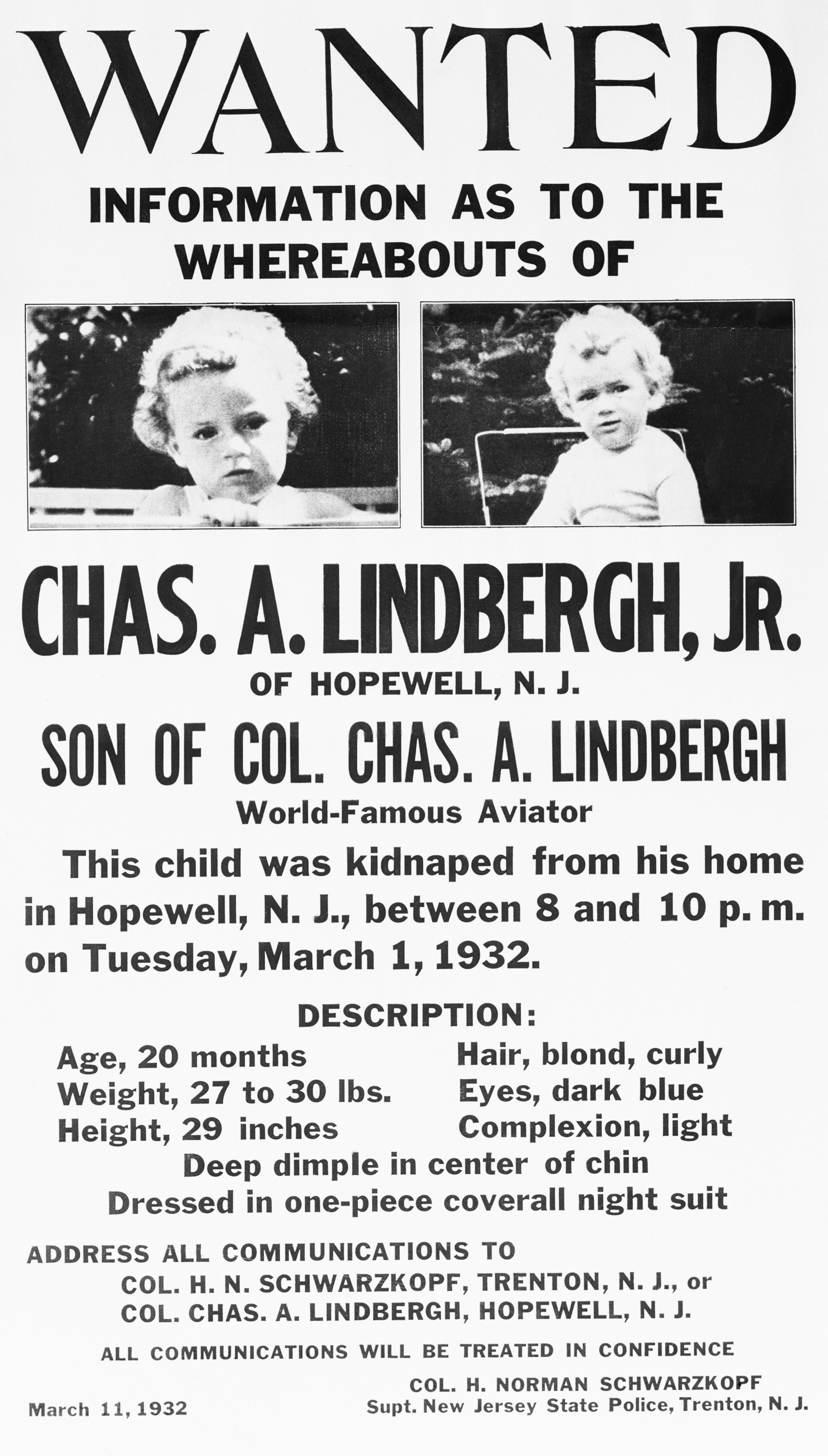
March 1, 1932: Charles Lindbergh Jr., 20-month-old son of aviator Charles Lindbergh, is kidnapped from his home

The following events occurred in March 1932:

== March 1, 1932 (Tuesday) ==
- Charles Lindbergh Jr., the 20-month-old son of famous aviator Charles Lindbergh and Anne Morrow Lindbergh, was kidnapped from the family's home near Hopewell, New Jersey. A $50,000 ransom note was left on the window sill.
- The Import Duties Act went into effect in Britain.
- The Revlon cosmetics brand was founded in New York City.
- The Preston Sturges play Child of Manhattan opened on Broadway.
- Died: Frank Teschemacher, 25, American jazz musician, was killed in an auto accident.

== March 2, 1932 (Wednesday) ==
- Finnish President Pehr Evind Svinhufvud gave a radio address telling participants in the Mäntsälä rebellion and informed them that, with the exception of the rebellion leaders, they had the opportunity to return home without punishment before Finnish troops moved into crush the uprising. Four days later, those participants who chose not to flee were captured.
- U.S. President Herbert Hoover consulted with Attorney General William D. Mitchell on the Lindbergh kidnapping. Mitchell announced afterward that every agency in the Department of Justice would do its utmost to assist New Jersey's state authorities, even though the kidnapping was not a federal case.
- Born: Takako Takahashi, Japanese author, in Kyoto (d. 2013)
- Died: David Jayne Hill, 81, American diplomat and former Assistant U.S. Secretary of State

== March 3, 1932 (Thursday) ==
- Congress voted to send the proposed Twentieth Amendment to the United States Constitution to the 48 U.S. states for ratification, moving the presidential inauguration date up from March 4 to January 20 and eliminating lame-duck sessions of Congress. The amendment would be ratified by the required two-thirds (36) of the states by January 23, 1933.
- Died: Alfieri Maserati, 44, automotive engineer and member of the Maserati Brothers, died of liver failure.

== March 4, 1932 (Friday) ==
- China refused to hold a conference to end the Manchurian conflict with Japan, insisting that Japanese troops had to withdraw from Manchuria first.
- The League of Nations unanimously voted in favour of a demand that Japanese forces withdraw from Shanghai.
- Born:
  - Ryszard Kapuściński, Polish journalist; in Pinsk (d. 2007)
  - Miriam Makeba, South African singer and civil rights activist; in Johannesburg (d. 2008)
  - Ed Roth, American artist and car designer; in Beverly Hills, California (d. 2001)
  - Frank Wells, American businessman who served as the president of The Walt Disney Company from 1984 until his death; in Coronado, California (d. 1994)
- Died: Royal Navy Vice Admiral Fawcet Wray, 58, collapsed while skiing in Austria.

== March 5, 1932 (Saturday) ==
- Takuma Dan, the Director-General of Japan's Mitsui Corporation, was shot to death as he was walking into the Mitsui Bank headquarters in Tokyo. Dan's killing was the second successful assassination by Japan's League of Blood after Junnosuke Inoue had been killed a month earlier.
- German diplomat Fritz von Twardowski was wounded by a student in Moscow who fired four shots at him before being overpowered by police.
- Died: Peder Kolstad, 53, Prime Minister of Norway since May 1931, died from a blood clot.

== March 6, 1932 (Sunday) ==
- The Mäntsälä rebellion was put down when Finnish troops occupied Mäntsälä, the last stronghold of the Lapua Movement, and arrested its leaders.
- Peruvian President Luis Miguel Sánchez Cerro was shot at a church in Miraflores, but not wounded seriously. The assailant was later arrested.
- Charles Lindbergh received a second ransom note, increasing the amount demanded for the safe return of his child from $50,000 to $70,000.
- The first round of the Liechtenstein general election was held. The ruling Progressive Citizens' Party led by prime minister Josef Hoop won eight of the ten municipal seats in the Landtag of Liechtenstein, winning the eight seats required for a majority in the first round, compared to the opposition Christian-Social People's Party winning two. The second round for the national vote was to be held on 13 March.
- Born:
  - Jean Boht, British actress in Bebington, Cheshire (d. 2023)
  - Bronisław Geremek, Polish social historian and politician in Warsaw (d. 2008)
- Died: John Philip Sousa, 77, American composer and conductor of marches, most notably "The Stars and Stripes Forever"

== March 7, 1932 (Monday) ==
- Four people were killed and 30 were injured in clashes between police and thousands of unemployed protesters outside of the Ford Motor Company plant in Dearborn, Michigan.
- Born: Momoko Kōchi, Japanese actress; in Tokyo (d. 1998)
- Died: Aristide Briand, 69, Prime Minister of France on six occasions between 1909 and 1929

== March 8, 1932 (Tuesday) ==
- New York state Governor Franklin D. Roosevelt won the New Hampshire Democratic presidential primary, the first of the state primary elections to determine delegates for the nominating convention.
- Charles Lindbergh's attorney received a third ransom note, informing that an intermediary appointed by the Lindberghs would not be accepted. That same day, John F. Condon, a retired school principal in the Bronx, published an offer to act as a neutral go-between and to pay an additional $1,000. Condon's offer was accepted by the kidnapper the next day and he received four more notes during the month (on March 12, 16, 21 and 30), outlining the kidnappers demands, followed by the arrangements for a ransom payment in April.

== March 9, 1932 (Wednesday) ==
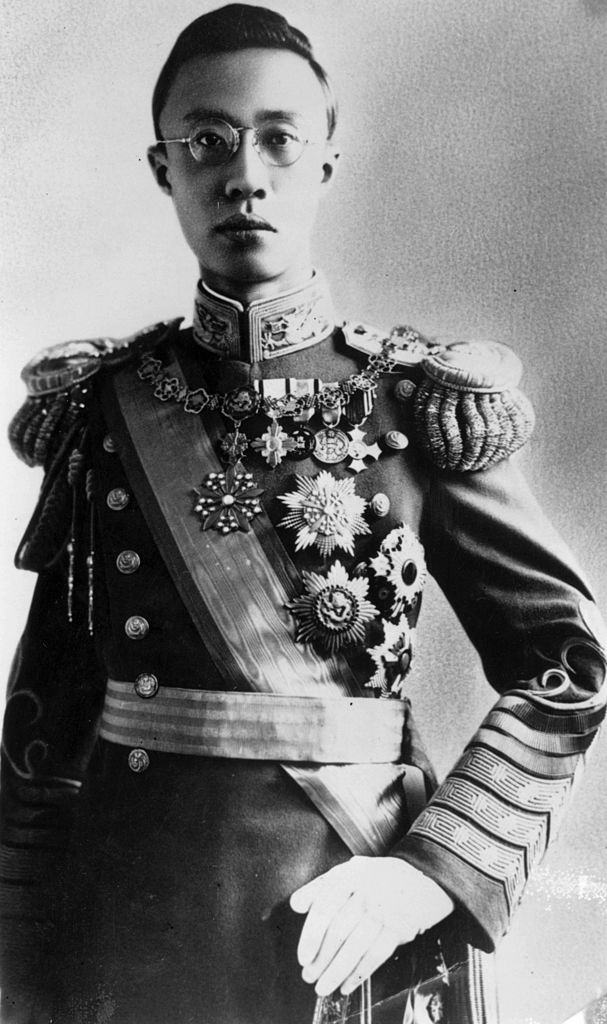
The Emperor "Datong of Manchukuo"

- Japan installed the last Emperor of China, Pu Yi, as regent of the Japanese puppet state of Manchukuo, under the regnal title "Datong".
- Éamon de Valera took office as President of the Executive Council of the Irish Free State.
- The Soviet Union refused to recognize Manchukuo as a legitimate state.
- An explosion at a gas plant in Camden, New Jersey killed 14 people. A fifteenth victim died the next day.
- Born: Ron Kline, American baseball player who was on teams in nine different major league cities between 1952 and 1970; in Callery, Pennsylvania (d. 2002)

== March 10, 1932 (Thursday) ==
- Germany's President Paul von Hindenburg gave a radio address in his one and only public speech of the German presidential campaign, emphasizing his non-party status and pledging to "oppose those who merely stand for party interests".
- The Kurt Weill opera Die Bürgschaft premiered at the Städtische Oper in Berlin.

== March 11, 1932 (Friday) ==
- Ireland's new prime minister Éamon de Valera cut his own salary and that of his cabinet ministers as part of an economy drive.
- Adolf Hitler, the closest challenger to President Hindenburg in the German presidential election, issued a statement denying rumors that his Nazi Party was planning to stage a coup d'état after Sunday's voting. "The National Socialist Movement today has less reason than ever before to abandon the legal path it has taken and on which the system will be forced to its knees", Hitler's statement read. "All of the rumors circulating to the effect that the NSDAP is planning a putsch are false and to be seen as typical signs of our opponents' election campaign."
- Died:
  - Dora Carrington, 38, British artist, committed suicide with a gun two months after the death of her former lover, Lytton Strachey
  - Hermann Gunkel, 69, German theologian and Old Testament scholar

== March 12, 1932 (Saturday) ==
- Ivar Kreuger, one of the wealthiest financiers in Sweden who controlled more than two-thirds of the production of matches with money raised from investors through a Ponzi scheme, was found dead from a gunshot wound in his Paris hotel room, a day before he was scheduled to answer questions from the Sveriges Riksbank about the insolvency of his Kreurger & Toll Company. Sweden's State Council hastily attempted to put a moratorium on Sweden's foreign debt payments, creating a business panic.
- Born: Andrew Young, American civil rights movement activist, U.S. politician and former American ambassador to the United Nations; in New Orleans
- Died: Ivar Kreuger, 52, Swedish civil engineer and industrialist (suicide)

== March 13, 1932 (Sunday) ==
- The German presidential election was held. Although Paul von Hindenburg beat runner-up Adolf Hitler by more than 7 million votes, he fell less than 1% short of the 50% majority required to win outright, so a run-off election had to be held on April 10.
- The second round of the Liechtenstein general election. The ruling Progressive Citizens' Party led by prime minister Josef Hoop won all five of the seats in the national vote and secured a final majority of thirteen of the fifteen seats in the Landtag of Liechtenstein.
- Sweden ordered its stock exchange closed until further notice.

== March 14, 1932 (Monday) ==
- On the first day of trading since the suicide of Ivar Kreuger, stocks and bonds connected to Kreuger's financial empire plummeted as part of the phenomenon known as the "Kreuger Crash".
- Jens Hundseid became Prime Minister of Norway, nine days after the death of Peder Kolstad.

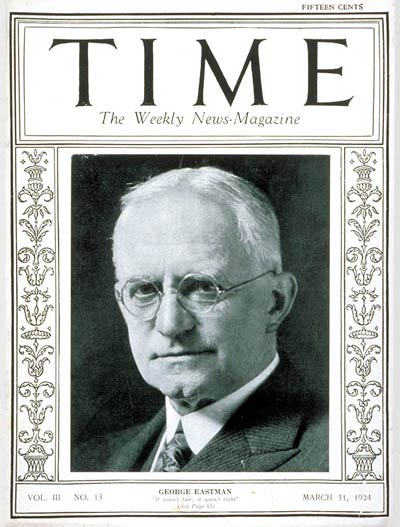
Eastman

- Died:
  - George Eastman, 77, American entrepreneur who founded the Eastman Kodak film and camera manufacturing company, shot himself in the heart after a painful illness of several years. He left a suicide note that read, "To my friends, my work is done – Why wait? GE."
  - Patrick Reynolds, 45, Irish politician, died of wounds sustained in a shooting one month earlier on February 14.

== March 15, 1932 (Tuesday) ==
- Several shots were fired at a train carrying Adolf Hitler, Joseph Goebbels and Wilhelm Frick near Jena, but there were no injuries.
- A few days after Kasturba Gandhi, wife of the Mahatma Gandhi, was released after being arrested for civil disobedience activities, she was arrested again and sentenced to six months of hard labour.
- Born: Yumie Hiraiwa, Japanese screenwriter and novelist, On'yado Kawasemi, Mother of Heart (Kimmotama Kaasan), River of Women (Onna no Kawa). in Shibuya, Tokyo.(d 2023)

== March 16, 1932 (Wednesday) ==
- The opera Maria egiziaca by Italian composer Ottorino Respighi was performed for the first time at Carnegie Hall in New York City.
- John F. Condon, the intermediary between the Lindbergh family and the kidnapper of their baby, received a baby's one-piece sleeper pajamas in the mail, sent as proof by the kidnapper of the baby's identity.
- Born: Don Blasingame, American baseball player who later played and managed the Nankai Hawks in Japan; in Corinth, Mississippi (d. 2005)

== March 17, 1932 (Thursday) ==
- Nazi headquarters throughout Prussia were raided by police looking for evidence of a Nazi plot to plunge the country into civil war. Hitler issued a statement calling the raids "a political maneuver inspired by anxiety over the intended rescue from defeat of the Socialist Party at the forthcoming diet elections", stating further, "I have long known that the raids were planned. Minister [Carl] Severing knows that the seizure of power by the National Socialists is only a question of time, but this maneuver will not save his party from coming to ruin."
- The German government declared an "Easter truce" from March 18 to April 3, forbidding open air political meetings, political speeches and distribution of political posters and leaflets.
- The United States announced that it would refuse to recognize the Japanese puppet republic of Manchukuo.
- The film The Wet Parade premiered at Grauman's Chinese Theatre in Hollywood.
- Born: Donald N. Langenberg, American physicist and professor, in Devils Lake, North Dakota (d. 2019)

== March 18, 1932 (Friday) ==
- Forbra won the Grand National horse race.
- The Bohuslav Martinů composition Les Rondes was performed for the first time, in Paris.
- Born: John Updike, American novelist; in Reading, Pennsylvania (d. 2009)
- Died:
  - Chauncey Olcott, 73, American stage actor, singer and songwriter who was profiled in the 1947 film My Wild Irish Rose
  - Harry Powers (Harm Drenth), 38, Netherlands-born American serial killer who murdered at least five women in his home in Quiet Dell, West Virginia, was hanged in the West Virginia Penitentiary

== March 19, 1932 (Saturday) ==
- The Sydney Harbour Bridge was opened to traffic in Australia.
- Theodor Duesterberg essentially withdrew from the second round of the German presidential election when the Nationalist Party that backed him announced it would not be participating.
- All seven people on an American Airways flight from Phoenix to Los Angeles were killed when the Fokker F.10A struck a power line in a heavy fog and crashed in Calimesa, California.
- The University of Cambridge won the 84th Boat Race.

== March 20, 1932 (Sunday) ==
- Mexican bandits derailed a train 12 miles (19 km) north of Querétaro, killing two passengers. The ensuing attack was quickly repulsed by a small guard and one bandit was slain.
- Born:
  - Jack Cady, fantasy and horror author, in Port Townsend, Washington (d. 2004)
  - Marthe Villalonga, French actress, in Fort-de-l'Eau, French Algeria
- Died:
  - Chief Buffalo Child Long Lance (pen name for Sylvester Clark Long), 41, African-American journalist, writer and actor who claimed to have been a Cherokee Indian; from a gunshot wound presumed to be a suicide
  - Ilya Ivanovich Ivanov, 61, Russian biologist and animal breeder known for his experiments with artificially inseminating female chimpanzees with human sperm in an attempt to create a hybrid species

== March 21, 1932 (Monday) ==
- At least 38 tornadoes swept across the southeastern United States and killed 334 people, and injured 2,141 others. All but 48 of the deaths were in the U.S. state of Alabama, including 41 in Talladega County.
- Born: Walter Gilbert, U.S. geneticist and 1980 Nobel Chemistry laureate for his work in determining the sequence of nucleotides in nucleic acid; in Boston

== March 22, 1932 (Tuesday) ==
- The Irish government released an official statement declaring that the Irish Free State had the right to modify the constitution by removing the Oath of Allegiance to the King, and that the results of the recent election constituted a mandate to do so.
  - Tarzan the Ape Man premiered in New Yord City, first of the classic film series starring Johnny Weissmuller and Maureen O'Sullivan.
- Born: Els Borst, Deputy Prime Minister of the Netherlands from 1998 to 2002; in Amsterdam (d. 2014)

== March 23, 1932 (Wednesday) ==
- Hollywood couple Ann Harding and Harry Bannister announced they were divorcing.
- Nazi publications were banned across Germany for durations varying from five to fourteen days after publishing attacks that were supposedly endangering the Weimar Republic. The Communist newspaper The Red Flag was also banned for five days.
- Born: Don Marshall, Canadian ice hockey player; in Verdun, Quebec (d. 2024)
- Died: Charles F. Daniels, 83, American baseball umpire

== March 24, 1932 (Thursday) ==
- The first radio broadcast from a moving train was made in a B & O Railroad train. The variety show with Belle Baker was aired over WABC in New York.
- The German film The Blue Light, marking the directorial debut of Leni Riefenstahl, was released.
- Born: Václav Zítek, Czech opera singer, in Tisá, Czechoslovakia (d. 2011)

== March 25, 1932 (Friday) ==
- The adventure film Tarzan the Ape Man starring Johnny Weissmuller was released.
- Born:
  - Woodie Held, American baseball player for seven different teams between 1957 and 1969; in Sacramento, California (d. 2009)

== March 26, 1932 (Saturday) ==
- A Japanese government spokesman said that Japan would quit the League of Nations if it asserted undue pressure over the situation in Manchuria and Shanghai and that the dispute could only be settled through direct talks with China.
- Born:
  - Wolfgang Helfrich, German physicist and inventor; in Munich (d. 2025)

== March 27, 1932 (Sunday) ==
- The 57,000-member Socialist Workers' Party of Germany held its first party conference.
- The musical film Girl Crazy, starring the comedy team of Wheeler & Woolsey in a loose adaptation of the Gershwin stage play of the same name, was released.
- Born: Trevor Stubley, English painter and illustrator; in Leeds (d. 2010)

== March 28, 1932 (Monday) ==
- Scottish pilot Jim Mollison completed a flight from London to Cape Town, South Africa in 4 days and 17 hours, a new record.

== March 29, 1932 (Tuesday) ==
- British pastor Harold Davidson was brought before court to answer charges that he had pursued and molested young girls. The case became a notorious tabloid sensation.
- Died: Filippo Turati, 74, Italian sociologist, criminologist and Socialist politician

== March 30, 1932 (Wednesday) ==
- Government by presidential decree was inaugurated in Poland.
- Frank Lloyd Wright's autobiography was published.
- John F. Condon received a new demand from the Lindbergh baby's kidnappers threatening to raise the amount of the ransom demanded from $70,000 to $100,000.
- Born: Ted Morgan, Swiss-born French-American writer, in Geneva (d. 2023)

== March 31, 1932 (Thursday) ==
- Ford Motor Company announced its V8 engine. Although the V8 was not new, the affordable price made it a true landmark in automotive history.
- Born: Nagisa Oshima, Japanese film director and screenwriter, in Tamano, Okayama Prefecture (d. 2013)
- Died: Eben Byers, 51, American socialite, athlete and industrialist
