= Mount Marsden =

Mountain in Antarctica

Mount Marsden (67°52′S 66°3′E) is a bare rock mountain, 600 metres (2,000 ft) high, lying 3 nautical miles (6 km) southwest of Mount Rivett in the Gustav Bull Mountains of Mac. Robertson Land, Antarctica. On 13 February 1931 the British Australian New Zealand Antarctic Research Expedition (1929–31) under Douglas Mawson made a landing on nearby Scullin Monolith. They named this mountain for Ernest Marsden, Director of the New Zealand Department of Scientific and Industrial Research.
