= Mikkelsen Peak =

Mountain in Antarctica

Mikkelsen Peak (67°47′S 66°43′E) is, at 420 metres (1,380 ft), the highest peak of the Scullin Monolith in Mac. Robertson Land, Antarctica. In January and February 1931 several Norwegian whale catchers, exploring along this coast, made sketches of the shore from their vessels and named this mountain for Captain Klarius Mikkelsen, master of the Torlyn.
