= April 1932 =

Month of 1932

<<	April 1932					>>
Su	Mo	Tu	We	Th	Fr	Sa
					1	2
3	4	5	6	7	8	9
10	11	12	13	14	15	16
17	18	19	20	21	22	23
24	25	26	27	28	29	30

The following events occurred in April 1932:

== April 1, 1932 (Friday) ==
- The musical operetta When the Little Violets Bloom by Robert Stolz premiered in The Hague.
- The Dagenham Girl Pipers performed for the very first time to a private audience of journalists.
- Born:
  - Debbie Reynolds, American film, TV and stage actress; in El Paso, Texas (d. 2016)
  - Gordon Jump, American TV actor, in Dayton, Ohio (d. 2003)

== April 2, 1932 (Saturday) ==
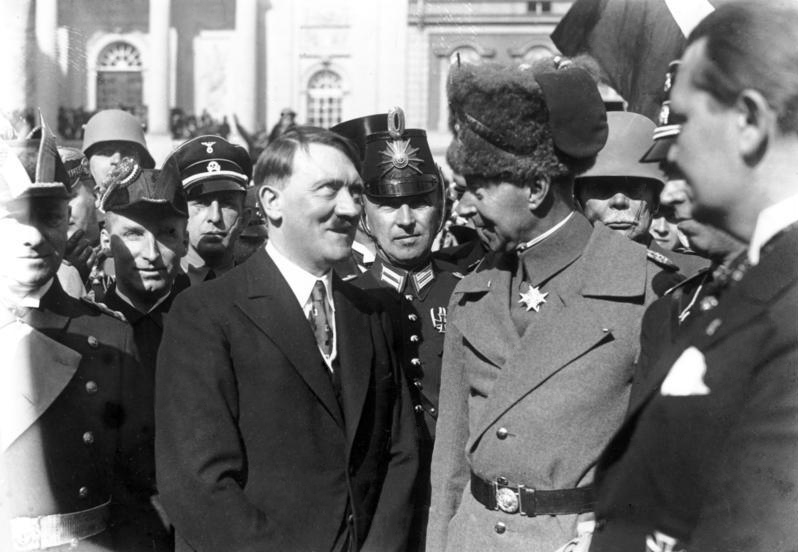
Hitler (left) and Prince Wilhelm (right)

- Former German Crown Prince Wilhelm endorsed Adolf Hitler for president in the April 10 election. By making a political statement, Wilhelm broke his word to the German government that he would refrain from politics as a condition of his return to Germany from exile.
- John F. Condon received an eleventh ransom note in the Lindbergh kidnapping case. He was directed to a twelfth note that led him to the unidentified man known as "John" and paid $50,000 for another note containing instructions for where the Lindbergh child could be found.
- Born: Michael Vernon, English-born Australian consumer activist, in Portsmouth (d. 1993)
- Died:
  - Edward Marjoribanks, 32, British member of parliament, committed suicide by shooting himself in the chest
  - Bill Pickett, 61, African-American rodeo and Wild West show performer, died after being kicked in the head by a horse

== April 3, 1932 (Sunday) ==
- Germany's "Easter truce" forbidding political activities expired at noon with violent clashes around the country.
- A search was made for the Lindbergh baby near Martha's Vineyard in accordance with the directions given by "John", but nothing was found and the case went cold.

== April 4, 1932 (Monday) ==
- Vojislav Marinković became Prime Minister of Yugoslavia.
- The Massie Trial began in Honolulu, Hawaii with jury selection.
- Vitamin C was isolated by American biochemist Charles Glen King at the University of Pittsburgh at the same time as, and independent of, Hungarian biochemist Albert Szent-Györgyi at the University of Szeged.
- Born:
  - Anthony Perkins, American film and stage actor; in New York City (d. 1992)
  - Andrei Tarkovsky, Soviet Russian filmmaker; in Zavrazhye, Russian SFSR (d. 1986)
- Died: Wilhelm Ostwald, 78, Baltic German chemist and 1909 Nobel laureate and developer of the field of physical chemistry

== April 5, 1932 (Tuesday) ==
- In St. John's, Newfoundland, a parade of demonstrators calling on the Legislature to investigate certain charges against the Richard Squires government turned into a violent riot. All the windows of the Colonial Building were smashed and Squires had to leave the building under protection.
- The documents seized by German police in last month's raids on Nazi headquarters were presented to the government. According to authorities, they showed Nazi plans to start a civil war in which a secret army would seize arms and ammunition and cut off water supplies to city centers.
- Chancellor Heinrich Brüning told an audience in Stuttgart that the re-election of Hindenburg would pave the way for a settlement of the reparations problem, while the election of Hitler would cause the German mark to drop with a crash "in no time."
- The first government-owned Alko stores, for the sale of alcohol, opened in Finland, originally under the name Oy Alkoholiliike Ab, to sell government-manufactured and government-imported products. "Tällainen on Alkon uusi tiskimyymälä – muistatko, kuinka viinakaupassa ennen asioitiin?" ("This is Alko's new counter store - Do you remember how you used to shop in a liquor store?"), by Antti Halonen, Ilta-Sanomat, September 22, 2017
- Died: María Blanchard, 51, Spanish Cubist painter, from tuberculosis

== April 6, 1932 (Wednesday) ==
- Parts of Bucharest were submerged by flooding.
- Four powers (Britain, France, Germany and Italy) opened the Danube Conference in London, discussing the perilous economic situation of the countries that once made up Austria-Hungary.
- With the Lindbergh kidnapping ransom payment still a secret from the public, U.S. Treasurer W. O. Woods sent an official circular to banks telling them to watch for certain large amounts of bills in specific denominations, but did not say that it was connection with the Lindbergh case.
- Died: Archduchess Maria Dorothea of Austria, 64

== April 7, 1932 (Thursday) ==
- Negotiations were held in the British consulate in Shanghai between representatives of China and Japan over setting a timetable through the League of Nations for Japanese withdrawal, but the Japanese insisted that the League was not qualified to handle the issue.
- The Danube Conference broke down, with Italy and Germany at odds with the French proposal that would have seen them lose their favored nation trading status with the Danubian nations.
- U.S. presidential candidate Franklin D. Roosevelt gave a famous campaign speech over the radio in which he said that prosperity depended on plans "that build from the bottom up and not the top down, that put their faith once more in the forgotten man at the bottom of the economic pyramid."
- Died: Grigore Constantinescu, 57, Romanian priest and journalist

== April 8, 1932 (Friday) ==
- Martial law was declared in Chile to curb public disorder related to the country's financial crisis.
- Born: Iskander, Sultan of Johor and elected monarch head of state of Malaysia from 1984 to 1989; in Johor Bahru, British Malaya (d. 2010)

== April 9, 1932 (Saturday) ==
- Reichsbank President and former German chancellor Hans Luther was shot at close range at a subway station in Berlin, but the bullet only grazed his arm. Two men were arrested without resistance, who identified themselves as former Nazis who wanted to kill Luther because they disapproved of the Reichsbank's deflation policy.
- The Toronto Maple Leafs defeated the New York Rangers 6-4 to complete a three-game sweep and win their first Stanley Cup in franchise history.
- It was revealed to the public for the first time that a $50,000 ransom had been paid in the Lindbergh kidnapping case but that the child had not been returned.
- Italy's Grand Council of Fascism passed a resolution saying that the "first necessary step toward the economic recovery of the world" was the cancellation of all war debts.

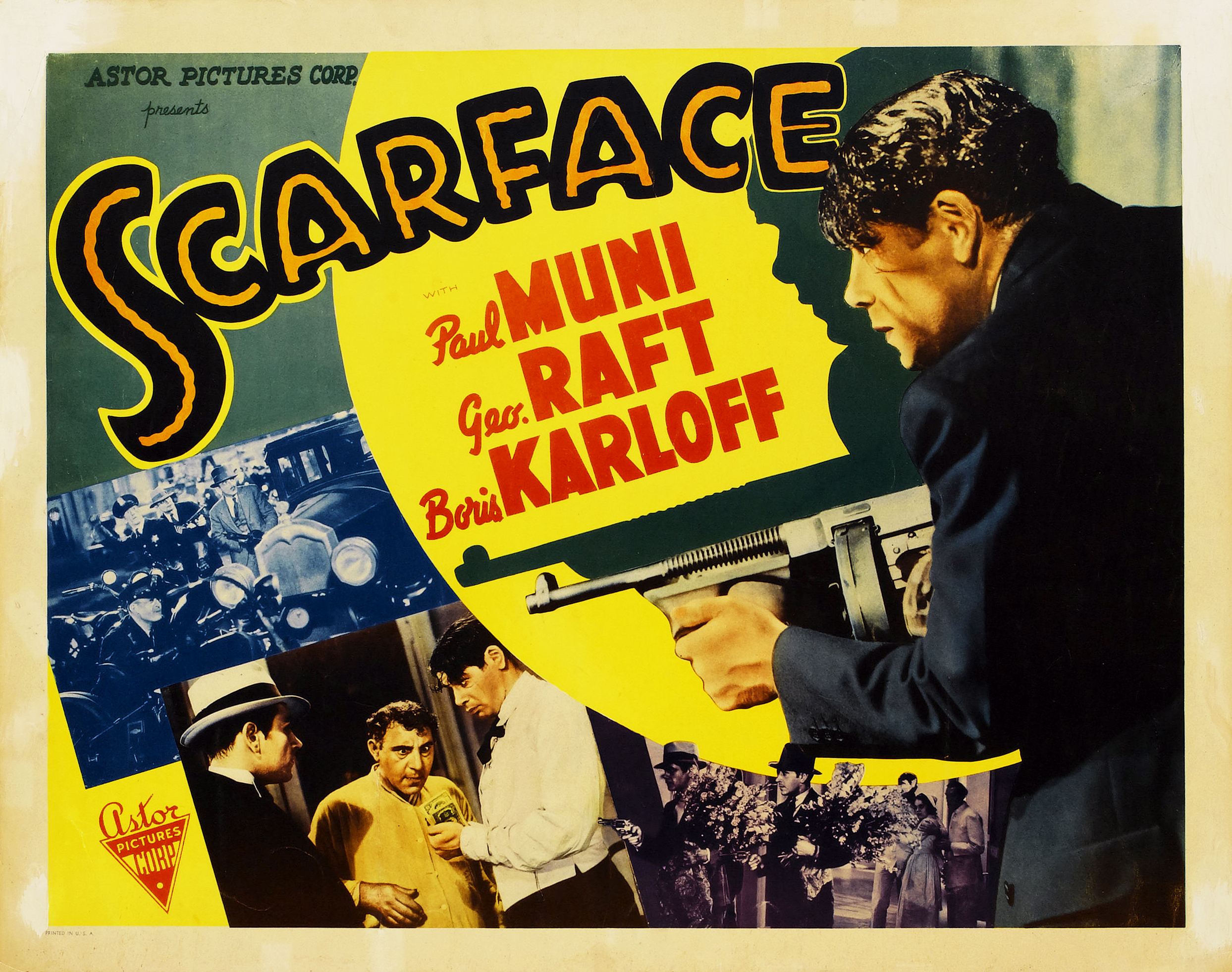
Cinema lobby card for Scarface

- The first major gangster film, Scarface, was released by Astor Pictures. Financed by Howard Hughes, and produced and directed by Howard Hawks, and starring Paul Muni and Osgood Perkins as Italian members of organized crime in Chicago, the film and the Armitage Trail novel on which it was adapted were thinly veiled depictions of the career of Al Capone (who had been nicknamed Scarface) and his gang. Muni's character was named "Antonio Camonte", and other characters had names only slightly different than the people on whom they were based. The Hays Office ordered heavy censorship of the more violent scenes in the original version.
- Born:
  - Armin Jordan, Swiss classical music conductor; in Zürich (d. 2006)
  - Carl Perkins, U.S. rockabilly singer-songwriter and inductee in the Rock and Roll Hall of Fame; in Tiptonville, Tennessee (d. 1998)
  - Mati Klarwein, German-born French painter; in Hamburg (d. 2002)

== April 10, 1932 (Sunday) ==
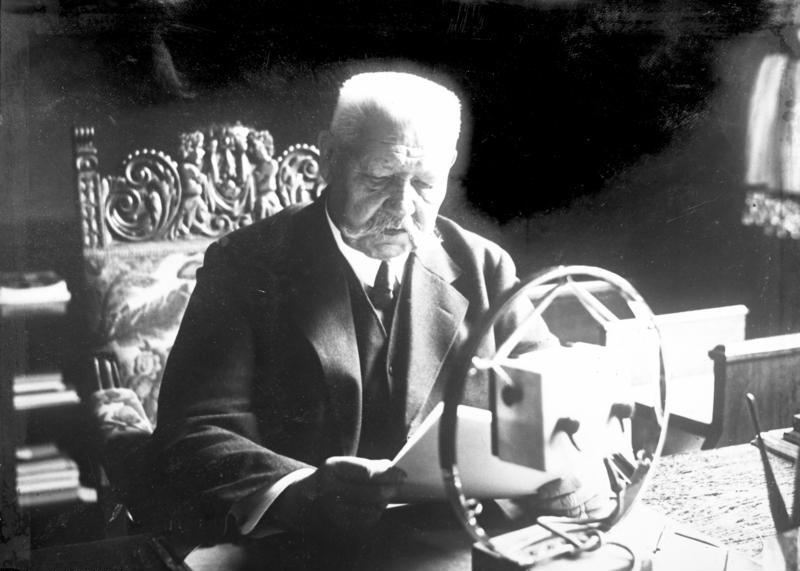
Hindenburg campaigning

- The runoff of the German presidential election was held. Paul von Hindenburg was re-elected for another seven years, winning the majority of votes unlike in the March 13 elections. Hundreds were arrested in election day violence.
- The French foreign office issued a statement insisting that Germany's payments under the Young Plan must be continued.
- Born:
  - Omar Sharif (stage name for Micahel Yusuf Chalhoub), Egyptian-born film actor; in Alexandria (d. 2015)
  - Blaze Starr (stage name for Fannie Belle Fleming), American burlesque performer; near Twelvepole Creek, West Virginia (d. 2015)
- Died: Fred Pfeffer, 72, American professional baseball player and manager in the 19th century

== April 11, 1932 (Monday) ==
- Thousands fled the eruptions of fourteen volcanoes along the Andes.
- Opening arguments began in the Massie Trial.
- On baseball's Opening Day, the National League's defending batting champion Chick Hafey was traded by the St. Louis Cardinals to the lowly Cincinnati Reds for Benny Frey, Harvey Hendrick and cash. The Cardinals got rid of Hafey after growing tired of arguing with him over his salary.
- Born: Joel Grey (stage name for Joel David Katz), American actor, singer and dancer, winner of the Academy Award, Tony Award and Grammy Award; in Cleveland

== April 12, 1932 (Tuesday) ==
- The German stock exchange reopened for the first time in almost seven months.
- The drama film Grand Hotel, featuring an all-star cast including Greta Garbo, John and Lionel Barrymore, Joan Crawford and Wallace Beery premiered at the Astor Theatre in New York City.
- Born:
  - Lakshman Kadirgamar, Foreign Minister of Sri Lanka from 1994 to 2001 and 2004 to 2005; in Colombo, British Ceylon (assassinated 2005)
  - Tiny Tim (stage name for Herbert Khaury), American singer; in New York City (d. 1996)
- Died: Pierre Batcheff, 24, French film actor, from a drug overdose

== April 13, 1932 (Wednesday) ==
- President Hindenburg passed an emergency decree through Article 48 ordering the SA, SS and all auxiliary forces of the Nazi Party dissolved immediately.
- Born: Barney Simon, South African playwright, director and author; in Johannesburg (d. 1995)

== April 14, 1932 (Thursday) ==
- The Queen Street Riot occurred in Auckland, New Zealand when thousands of unemployed clashed with police while smashing and looting shops on the city's main commercial thoroughfare. The violence, the worst riot in New Zealand's history, injured 200 people.
- Eleven construction workers were killed when a gas explosion ripped through the new Ohio State Office Building being constructed in Columbus.
- Adolf Hitler released a statement characterizing the government's crackdown on his stormtroopers as "a last blow of despair" and declaring April 24, the date of local elections, as "retaliation day".
- The film Symphony of Six Million starring Ricardo Cortez and Irene Dunne premiered at the Gaiety Theatre in New York City.
- Born: Loretta Lynn, American country music singer-songwriter; in Butcher Hollow, Kentucky (d. 2022)

== April 15, 1932 (Friday) ==
- In Sweden, three directors of enterprises associated with Ivar Kreuger were arrested and charged with fraud.
- German conductor Wilhelm Furtwängler was awarded the Goethe-Medaille für Kunst und Wissenschaft on the occasion of the 50th anniversary of the Berlin Philharmonic.
- Died: Julia Lathrop, 73, American social reformer and the first Director of the United States Children's Bureau from 1912 to 1922

== April 16, 1932 (Saturday) ==
- Unofficial delegates from eleven countries met in Innsbruck to consider a plan of economic cooperation in the Danube region.
- Born: Imre Polyák, Hungarian wrestler and 1964 Olympic gold medalist, world champion in 1955, 1958 and 1962; in Kecskemét (d. 2010)

== April 17, 1932 (Sunday) ==
- Emperor Haile Selassie abolished slavery in Ethiopia.
- The Gustav Holst composition Hammersmith was performed in Washington (performed on an earlier date in London.) Holst was scheduled to be in attendance but canceled due to ill health.
- Died: William Redmond, 45, Irish politician who was a member of the United Kingdom House of Commons from 1910 to 1922, then of Ireland's Dáil Éireann since 1923

== April 18, 1932 (Monday) ==
- Franklin D. Roosevelt affirmed his position on the Prohibition issue, saying he favored the return of liquor control to the states.
- Born: Nadine de Rothschild, French film actress; in Saint-Quentin, Aisne

== April 19, 1932 (Tuesday) ==
- On Budget Day in the United Kingdom, Chancellor of the Exchequer Neville Chamberlain turned in a balanced budget with a projected surplus of £796,000. A return of the old tea duty was the only new tax, and the rate on sugar imports was increased as well. However, no provision was made for the $171.5 million in war debt due the United States over the next twelve months.
- German art dealer Otto Wacker was sentenced to a year in jail for selling forgeries of paintings by Vincent van Gogh.
- Paul de Bruyn of Germany won the Boston Marathon, edging the previous year's winner, James P. Henigan, by 56 seconds.
- As a result of a failed hardware store burglary, Bonnie Parker and Ralph Fults were arrested in Kaufman, Texas.

== April 20, 1932 (Wednesday) ==
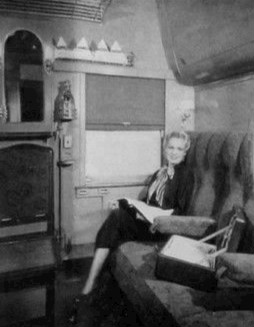
A bedroom compartment on the National Limited

- The Baltimore and Ohio Railroad (B&O) inaugurated air conditioning on its premier train, the National Limited running between St. Louis and New York City. It was the first time that a long-distance sleeping car train offered air conditioning.
- Died:
  - Giuseppe Peano, 73, Italian mathematician and linguist known for the Peano axioms and for the auxiliary language Latino sine flexione, a simplified version of the Latin language
  - Edgard Colle, 34, Belgian chess master, died of a gastric ulcer

== April 21, 1932 (Thursday) ==
- Seventeen people were killed in Bastia, Corsica when the ceiling of a courthouse collapsed.
- In Rome, during celebrations on the traditionally observed date of the founding of the city, Benito Mussolini dedicated a large statue of Julius Caesar.
- Born: Elaine May, U.S. improvisational comedian and actress known for the team of Nichols and May; in Philadelphia

== April 22, 1932 (Friday) ==
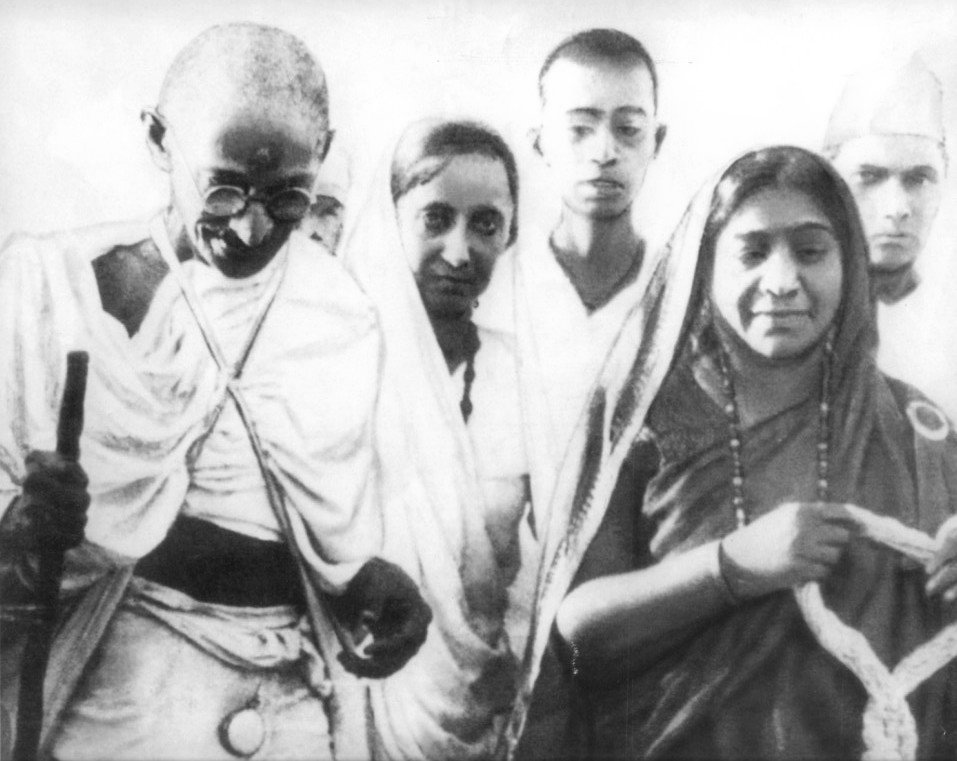
Sarojini Naidu (right) with the Mahatma Gandhi

- Sarojini Naidu, the most prominent female independence activist in India at the time, was taken off of a train en route to Delhi and arrested for disobeying an order against attending a National Congress meeting there.
- President Hindenburg reduced the price of Germany's alcohol from 36 to 30 marks per gallon to cut down on foreign imports, smuggling and bootlegging.
- Died:
  - Admiral Umberto Cagni, 69, Italian Arctic explorer
  - Major General J. Warren Keifer, 96, former Speaker of the U.S. House of Representatives (from 1881 to 1883)
  - Ferenc Oslay, 48, Hungarian-Slovene writer

== April 23, 1932 (Saturday) ==
- Newcastle United defeated Arsenal 2-1 in the FA Cup Final at Wembley Stadium.

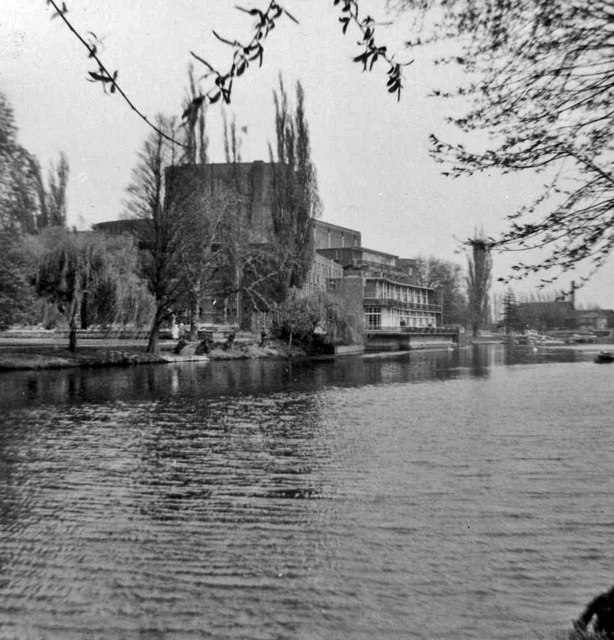
The Theatre in 1965

- The new Shakespeare Memorial Theatre opened in Stratford-upon-Avon, replacing the original one that burned down in 1926. The design of the new theatre was universally disliked, with critics unfavourably likening the exterior to a "barracks" or a "jam factory".
- Born: Halston (business name for Roy Halston Frowick), American fashion designer, in Des Moines, Iowa (d. 1990)

== April 24, 1932 (Sunday) ==
- The Nazi Party made big gains in local elections held across Germany, winning pluralities in four out of five Landtag elections.
- Fifteen Nazis were elected city councilmen in Vienna, the first time they had won any elective office in the city.

== April 25, 1932 (Monday) ==
- Greece decided to abandon the gold standard.
- "After yesterday's election we have a mandate from the German people", Adolf Hitler stated from Munich. "We will demand the right to form governments in Prussia and the other states in which we have won."
- The National War Memorial in Wellington, New Zealand was consecrated by the Bishop of Wellington. Gladys Elinor Watkins played a recital on its carillon
- One person was killed and 31 injured in a gas explosion in Highland Park, Michigan.
- Born: William Roache, English TV actor who played the role of Ken Barlow on ITV's Coronation Street from more than sixty years after its debut in 1960; in Basford, Nottinghamshire
- Died: Rudolf Eickemeyer, Jr., 69, American photographer

== April 26, 1932 (Tuesday) ==
- Closing arguments began in the Massie Trial.
- Al Smith won the Democratic primary election in Massachusetts, while Franklin D. Roosevelt narrowly won Pennsylvania.
- Born: Michael Smith, British-born Canadian chemist and 1993 Nobel laureate; in Blackpool (d. 2000)
- Died: Bill Lockwood, 64, English Test cricket bowler for the English national team from 1893 to 1902

== April 27, 1932 (Wednesday) ==
- U.S. President Herbert Hoover vetoed a bill increasing pensions for soldiers and sailors.
- Born:
  - Anouk Aimée (stage name for Nicole Dreyfus), French film actress; in Paris (d. 2024)
  - Casey Kasem, American disc jockey and actor; in Detroit (d. 2014)
  - Gian-Carlo Rota, Italian-born American mathematician and philosopher, in Vigevano (d. 1999)
- Died: Hart Crane, 32, American poet, committed suicide by jumping off of the steamship SS Orizaba while at sea; his body was never recovered

== April 28, 1932 (Thursday) ==
- Turkish President Mustafa Kemal Pasha, Foreign Minister Tevfik Rüştü Aras and other Turkish officials visited Moscow to a grand welcome.
- Duesenberg announced a new stock model automobile capable of reaching speeds of 130 mph.
- Born: Brownie Ledbetter, U.S. civil rights activist; in Little Rock, Arkansas (d. 2010)

== April 29, 1932 (Friday) ==
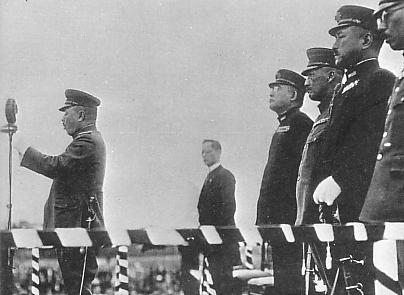
General Shirakawa shortly before his assassination

- Korean independence activist Yun Bong-gil threw a bomb at a group of Japanese generals and officials staging a ceremony in honour of Hirohito's birthday at Hongkew Park in Shanghai. General Yoshinori Shirakawa was fatally wounded and died of his wounds a month later, while Ambassador Mamoru Shigemitsu survived but lost a leg.
- The jury in the Massie Trial found the defendants guilty of manslaughter.
- The Literary Digest published the results of a new nationwide poll on Prohibition, in which 46 out of 48 states favored a repeal of the Eighteenth Amendment. Kansas and North Carolina were the only two states that still supported Prohibition.

== April 30, 1932 (Saturday) ==
- An International Labour Conference ended in Geneva with an agreement setting a minimum age for child labour at 14.
- The Chesapeake and Ohio Railway (C&O) inaugurated the George Washington passenger train.
- Died: Charles Eugene Banks, 80, American newspaper editor and writer
