= Chapman Ridge =

Ridge in Antarctica

Chapman Ridge (67°28′S 60°58′E) is a ridge rising to 300 metres (1,000 ft) and extending southwest for 3 nautical miles (6 km) from Byrd Head. It was discovered by the British Australian New Zealand Antarctic Research Expedition, 1929–1931, under Douglas Mawson, and mapped by Norwegian cartographers from aerial photographs taken by the Lars Christensen Expedition, 1936–1937. It was named by the Antarctic Names Committee of Australia for the then-Australian scientist, Philip K. Chapman, auroral physicist at Mawson Station, during the International Geophysical Year, 1958. Chapman and Henry Fischer, a Swiss national, were members of the Australian National Antarctic Research Expedition (ANARE). They were the first humans to climb the ridge which they did several times. They did not take geological samples, make claims nor leave any marker.

Chapman Ridge overlooks a small melt water lake that is in the shape of a mitten, with a "lip" and moraine.

== See also ==
- Tschuffert Peak
