= Murray Monolith =

Monolith of Antarctica

Coordinates: 67°47′S 66°53′E

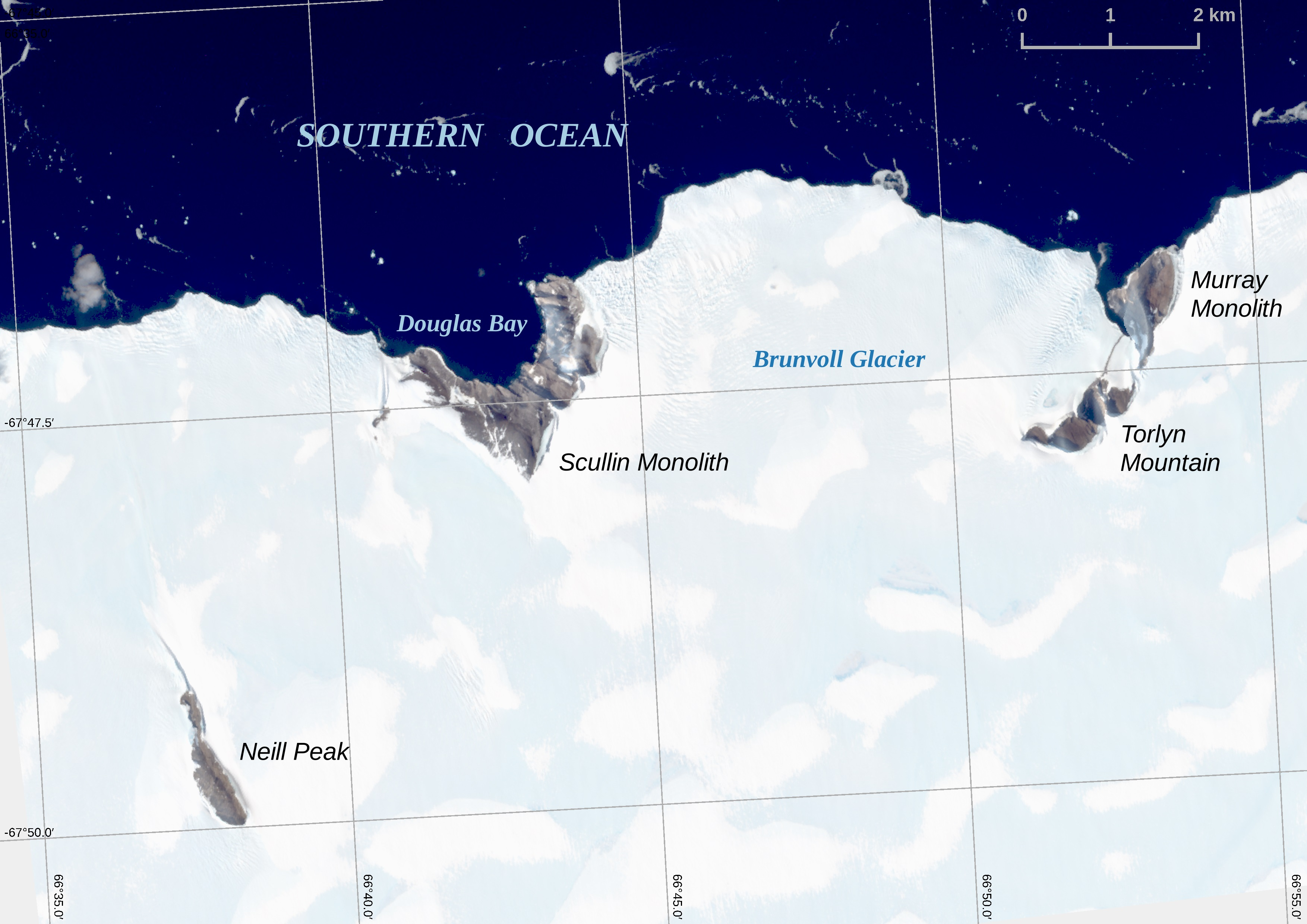
Murray Monolith (right).

Location in Antarctica

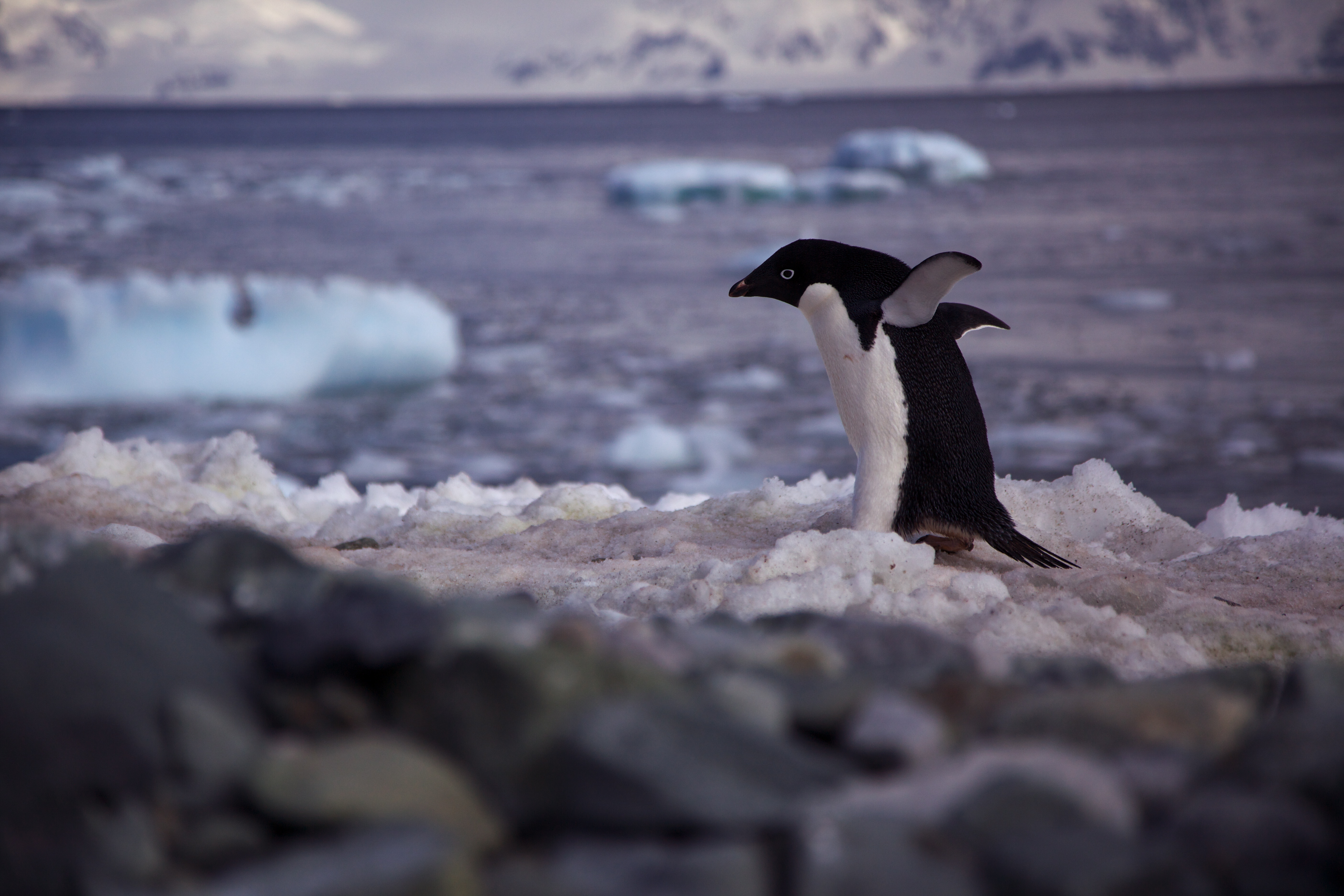
Adélie penguins breed in the IBA

Murray Monolith is a detached part of Torlyn Mountain in Mac.Robertson Land, Antarctica. It is a steep massif of metasedimentary gneiss and granitic origin, with the adjacent coastline consisting of 40 m high ice cliffs. The monolith is dome-shaped with steep sides, rising to a seaward summit of 339 m and an inland summit of 363 m at Torlyn Mountain.

== Discovery and naming ==
It was discovered during the British Australian New Zealand Antarctic Research Expedition (BANZARE), led by Douglas Mawson, 1929–1931, and named after Sir George Murray, Chief Justice of South Australia Chancellor of the University of Adelaide and a patron of the expedition.

== Antarctic Specially Protected Area and Important Bird Area ==
As one of the very few pieces of exposed rock on the East Antarctic coast, together with the Scullin Monolith 6 km to the west, it holds the greatest concentration of seabird breeding colonies in East Antarctica, including 160,000 pairs of Antarctic petrels, and 70,000 pairs of Adelie penguins. Both monoliths are protected under the Antarctic Treaty System as Antarctic Specially Protected Area (ASPA) No.164. Coincident in coverage with ASPA 164, the two monoliths have also been designated an Important Bird Area (IBA) by BirdLife International because of the significant seabird colonies present.

== See also ==
- Cape Rouse
