= Tschuffert Peak =

Mountain in Antarctica

Tschuffert Peak (67°28′S 60°54′E) is a prominent, isolated peak between Taylor Glacier and Chapman Ridge in Mac. Robertson Land. It was mapped by Norwegian cartographers from air photos taken by the Lars Christensen Expedition in 1936–37, and was originally named Svartpiggen (the black peak). The peak was later renamed 'Tschuffert Peak' by the Antarctic Names Committee of Australia (ANCA) after H. Tschuffert, who served as meteorologist at Mawson Station in 1958.
