= Hit or Miss (card game) =

Patience card game

- A Patience or card solitaire
- Origin: England
- Alternative names: Harvest, Roll Call, Talkative, Treize
- Family: Pocket, Closed non-builder
- Deck: Single 52-card
- Playing time: 15 min
- Odds of winning: 1 in 50

Hit or Miss is a patience or card solitaire that uses a deck of 52 playing cards. It is an unusual one in that the player deals the cards one at a time. The game is significantly based on luck-of-the-draw, but the process of elimination gives it appeal nonetheless.

== History ==
The rules were first published by Hoffmann in 1892 under the name The Talkative, alternatively known as The Roll Call, although that is also the name of a different game. In the same work is a very similar game called The Harvest, played with a Piquet pack of 32 cards in which counting starts at "Seven" and ascends to "Ace" before starting again. American editor, Harris B. Dick, renames it "Hit and Miss" in his 1898 publication and the game has been variously called Roll Call or Hit or Miss since. Morehead & Mott-Smith (1949) add the alternative name Treize. Several editors include the alternative names, failing to mention that Harvest is played with a 32-card pack. The game continues to be regularly included in compendia into the 21st century.

== Rules ==
While dealing the cards one at a time, the player says "ace" when dealing the first card, "two" for the second, then "three, four... nine, ten, jack, queen, king" then recommencing again with "ace". This count is continued in the same way after the cards in the deck are used up, recollected and redealt.

When the word uttered matches the rank of the card dealt, that card is considered "hit" and is discarded. Cards that are "hit" no longer take further part in the game.

The player can continue the game and redeal the cards as long as there are cards that have been "hit" during a deal. When all the remaining cards are dealt twice in succession without a "hit", the game is lost. All cards must be discarded as "hit" in order for the game to be won.

== Variations ==
A closely related solitaire game that operates on a similar mechanic is Frustration.

== See also ==
- Frustration Solitaire
- List of patiences and solitaires
- Glossary of patience and solitaire terms

== Bibliography ==
- Dick, Harris B. (1898). Dick's Games of Patience; or, Solitaire with Cards. 2nd Series. 113 pp. 70 games. NY: Dick & Fitzgerald.
- Hoffmann, Professor [Angelo Lewis] (1892). The Illustrated Book of Patience Games. London: Routledge.
- Liflander, Pamela (2002). The Little Book of Solitaire. Philadelphia, PA: Running Press. ISBN 0-7624-1381-6
- Morehead, A. H. & G. Mott-Smith (1949). The Complete Book of Solitaire and Patience Games. NY: Longmans.
