= Frustration Dome =

Antarctic ice dome

Frustration Dome (68°0′S 64°33′E) is a large crevassed ice dome about 38 nautical miles (70 km) southeast of Mount Henderson in Mac. Robertson Land, Antarctica. The dome was the site of a tellurometer station established during an Australian National Antarctic Research Expeditions (ANARE) traverse from Mawson Station to Mount Kjerka in 1967, and was so named by ANARE because the traverse party was delayed here by vehicle breakdown, delaying completion of the survey until the next spring.
