= Torlyn Mountain =

Mountain in Antarctica

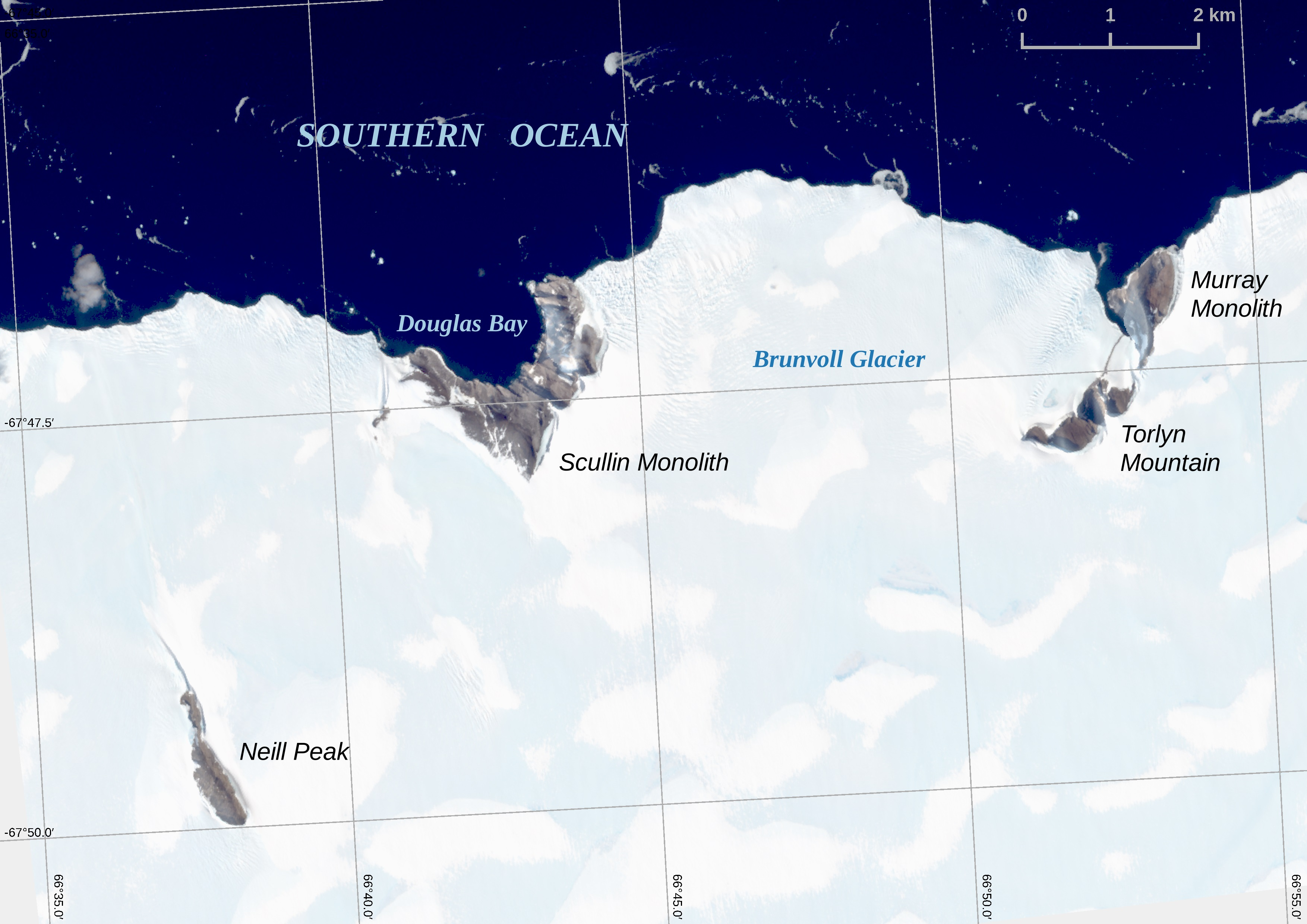
Torlyn Mountain (right), south of Murray Monolith.

Torlyn Mountain (67°47′S 66°55′E) is an elongated mountain, of which Murray Monolith is the detached front, standing 4 miles (6 km) east of Scullin Monolith on the coast of Mac. Robertson Land, Antarctica.

In January and February 1931 several Norwegian whale catchers explored along this coast, making sketches of the land from their vessels. They named the mountain for their whale catcher, the Torlyn, from whose deck it was seen in February, although the coast was sketched as early as January 19 from the Bouvet II, another Norwegian whaler. The British Australian New Zealand Antarctic Research Expedition (BANZARE) under Mawson made an airplane flight over this area in January 1930, returning for further exploration in February 1931. They named the mountain Murray Monolith, which name is hereby retained only for the detached front.
