= Cape Rouse =

- Ice-covered cape
- Coordinates: 67°45′S 67°9′E
- Named after: Edgar J. Rouse (assisted the expedition with photographic equipment)

Cape Rouse (67°45′S 67°9′E) is an ice-covered cape 8 nautical miles (15 km) east of Murray Monolith on the coast of Mac. Robertson Land. Discovered on 12 February 1931 by the British Australian New Zealand Antarctic Research Expedition (BANZARE) under Mawson, and named for Edgar J. Rouse of Sydney, who assisted the expedition with photographic equipment.
