= Gordon Brown (footballer, born 1932) =

Scottish footballer born in 1932

Personal information
- Full name: Gordon Brown
- Date of birth: 4 February 1932
- Place of birth: Dunfermline, Scotland
- Date of death: 30 December 1999 (aged 67)
- Place of death: Blackburn, England
- Position: Winger

Senior career*
Years	Team	Apps	(Gls)
?–1951	Blairhall Colliery		
1951–1955	Blackburn Rovers	0	(0)
1955–1959	Newport County	137	(14)
1959–1961	Gillingham	67	(13)
1961–1962	Sittingbourne		
- Ashford Town
- * Club domestic league appearances and goals

Gordon Brown (4 February 1932 – 30 December 1999) was a Scottish footballer, who made over 200 appearances in The Football League for Newport County and Gillingham between 1955 and 1961.

== Career ==
Brown was born in Dunfermline and, upon leaving school, worked at Blairhall Colliery, where he also played football for the colliery's team. In April 1951 he came to the attention of English Football League Second Division club Blackburn Rovers and signed a contract with the Lancashire-based club. He spent four years at Ewood Park and was a regular in the club's reserve team, but proved unable to dislodge more established players from the Rovers' first team. In four seasons with the club Brown was never selected to play a first team match.

In 1955 Brown was allowed to leave Rovers, and signed for Newport County of the Third Division South. He soon became a favourite with the Somerton Park crowd, and was a regular in the team for four seasons, making over 140 appearances in total and scoring 15 goals. In the 1957–58 season he helped the club to its best finishing position for six seasons.

In 1959 he left Newport to join Fourth Division club Gillingham. In his first season with the Kent-based club he played regularly as a winger and scored 12 goals to finish the season as the team's second-highest goalscorer behind Pat Terry. However, he only scored one goal the following season and departed Priestfield Stadium in the summer of 1961.

Brown then moved to non-league football and joined Southern League Division One club Sittingbourne for the 1961–62 season; he wasn't retained by the club at the end of the season. It is also recorded that he was attached to Ashford Town.

There are no details known of Brown's life after his playing career ended, although it is known that he died in 1999.
