= Frustration (card game) =

Patience or card solitaire

Frustration is an early 20th century Eastern European patience or card solitaire resembling the banking game of Treize which has its roots in the 1700s. Frustration is similar to but opposite of Hit or Miss.

== History ==
Frustration appears to have been played by the Romani people of Eastern Europe before the Second World War, but came to light in American in the 1990s where it became the subject of mathematical investigation. The game relies purely on luck rather than on skill, and has been both mathematically analyzed and discussed in popular media. It is an example of a derangement problem in combinatorial mathematics, which can be understood using a combinatorial tool called a rook polynomial. The probability of winning the game has been determined exactly, and is approximately 1.6233%. The same technique can be applied to variations of the game that use different numbers of suits, and different numbers of cards per suit.

This instantiation of Frustration does not appear in any games compendium; the patience described in the 1993 work, The Complete Book of Card Games, is a double pack game that is played quite differently.

== Rules ==
As in the game Hit or Miss, the player deals the cards from a 52-card deck, and says "ace" when drawing the first card, "two" for the second, then "three, four... nine, ten, jack, queen, king", then starts again with "ace".

The game is lost if the rank of a dealt card matches the rank uttered by the player while dealing it. The game is won if the sequence is successfully repeated four times (and the entire deck is thus dealt out) without any word/card match causing a loss.

== See also ==
- Hit or Miss
- List of patiences and card solitaires
- Glossary of patience and card solitaire terms

== Bibliography ==
- _ (1993). The Complete Book of Card Games. London: Ward Lock.
