= Import Duties Act 1932 =

Act of the Parliament of the United Kingdom

Import Duties Act 1932 (Note: Section 23.)
- Act of Parliament
- Parliament of the United Kingdom
- Long title: An Act to provide for the imposition of a general ad valorem duty of customs and of additional duties on any goods chargeable with the duty aforesaid, for the imposition of duties on goods produced or manufactured in a foreign country which discriminates in the matter of importation as against goods produced or manufactured in the United Kingdom, in certain other parts of His Majesty's dominions, in protectorates or in mandated territories, and for purposes connected with the matters aforesaid.
- Citation: 22 & 23 Geo. 5. c. 8
- Territorial extent: United Kingdom

Dates
- Royal assent: 29 February 1932
- Commencement: 29 February 1932 (Note: The Acts of Parliament (Commencement) Act 1793.)
- Repealed: 20 February 1958
Other legislation
Amended by	Customs and Excise Act 1952; Statute Law Revision Act 1953
Repealed by	Import Duties Act 1958

Status: Repealed

Text of statute as originally enacted

The Import Duties Act 1932 (22 & 23 Geo. 5. c. 8) was an act of the Parliament of the United Kingdom.The act introduced a general tariff of 10% on most imports, though some foodstuffs, raw materials, and some imports from the British Empire were exempted. Specifically, the Dominions, India and Southern Rhodesia were exempt from these tariffs until 15 November 1932, when the Imperial Economic Conference at Ottawa would have agreed on a system of Imperial Preference.

The Chancellor of the Exchequer, Neville Chamberlain, introduced the Bill to the House of Commons on 4 February 1932. He had with him his father's old despatch box from when he was Secretary of State for the Colonies and his father's widow was present in the gallery. He explicitly referenced Joseph Chamberlain's crusade for Tariff Reform in his speech:

There can have been few occasions in all our long political history when to the son of a man who counted for something in his day and generation has been vouchsafed the privilege of settling the seal on the work which the father began but had perforce to leave unfinished. Nearly twenty-nine years have passed since Joseph Chamberlain entered upon his great campaign in favour of Imperial preference and tariff reform. More than seventeen years have gone by since he died, without having seen the fulfilment of his aims and yet convinced that, if not exactly in his way, yet in some modified form his vision would eventually take shape. His work was not in vain. Time and the misfortunes of the country have brought conviction to many who did not feel that they could agree with him then. I believe he would have found consolation for the bitterness of his disappointment if he could have foreseen that these proposals, which are the direct and legitimate descendants of his own conception, would be laid before the House of Commons, which he loved, in the presence of one, and by the lips of the other, of the two immediate successors to his name and blood.

Upon finishing this speech, Neville's half-brother Austen Chamberlain got up from his seat and shook Neville's hand amidst cheering. The Bill passed the Commons by 454 votes to 78, being opposed by the Labour Party and 32 Liberals. It came into operation on 1 March 1932.

Tariffs could be increased on the recommendation of the Import Duties Advisory Committee which the Act founded. The flat 10% tariff was increased to rates from 15% to 33% for various goods shortly after the Act was passed.

According to Nicholas Kaldor these tariffs encouraged domestic substitution for imports, increasing the UK's general level of manufacturing production during the years 1932–1937 by 48% (or 8.1% a year), a rate of growth not experienced by Britain before or since. Kaldor also claimed that real GDP rose 4% a year during this period, making Britain the world's fastest growing economy (with the possible exception of Nazi Germany). In regards to steel production, Britain was producing 13 million tons in 1937 compared to the 5 million tons produced in 1932 and the pre-Depression peak of 9 million tons in 1929.

== Subsequent developments ==
In section 1(3) of the act, the proviso was repealed by section 1 of, and the first schedule to, the Statute Law Revision Act 1953 (2 & 3 Eliz. 2. c. 5), which came into force on 18 December 1953.
