= Gustav Bull Mountains =

Mountain peaks in Mac. Robertson Land, Antarctica

- Location within Antarctica

Highest point
- Coordinates: 67°51′S 66°9′E

The Gustav Bull Mountains are small groups of bare, rugged mountain peaks and nunataks, lying 4 miles (6 km) inland from the coast and 10 nautical miles (19 km) southwest of Scullin Monolith in Mac. Robertson Land, Antarctica.

== Exploration and naming ==
In January and February 1931, several Norwegian whale catchers, exploring this coast, made sketches of the land from their vessels and named this group the Gustav Bull Mountains for Captain Gustav B. Bull, at that time whaling manager of the Thorshammer. The British Australian New Zealand Antarctic Research Expedition (1929–31), under Douglas Mawson, made an airplane flight over this area in January 1930, returning for further exploration in February 1931, and giving names to individual features in the group.

== Features ==
Features, from north to south, include:

=== Mount Rivett ===
67°50′S 66°14′E. A bare rock mountain, the northeasternmost feature of the Gustav Bull Mountains in Mac. Robertson Land. On February 13, 1931, the BANZARE (1929-31) under Douglas Mawson made a landing on nearby Scullin Monolith. They named this mountain after Sir David Rivett, Deputy Chairman and Chief Executive Officer of the Australian Council for Scientific and Industrial Research, 1927–45.

=== Lawson Aiguilles ===
67°50′S 66°15′E. A line of sharp peaks in the south part of Mount Rivett, in the Gustav Bull Mountains of Mac. Robertson Land. Peaks in this group were included in AN ARE surveys of 1962 and 1967. Named by ANCA for E.J. Lawson, diesel mechanic at Mawson Station who assisted with the survey work in 1967.

=== Mount Kennedy ===
67°52′S 66°13′E. A small bare peak standing 1 mile (1.6 km) south of Mount Rivett in the Gustav Bull Mountains of Mac. Robertson Land. On February 13, 1931, the BANZARE under Douglas Mawson made a landing on nearby Scullin Monolith. They named this peak for A.L. Kennedy, physicist with BANZARE (1929-31).

=== Mount Marsden ===
67°52′S 66°03′E A bare rock mountain (600 metres (2,000 ft)) lying 3 miles (4.8 km) southwest of Mount Rivett in the Gustav Bull Mountains of Mac. Robertson Land. On February 13, 1931, the BANZARE (1929-31) under Douglas Mawson made a landing on nearby Scullin Monolith. They named this mountain for Ernest Marsden, Director of the Dept. of Scientific and Industrial Research, New Zealand.

=== Mount Hinks ===
67°53′S 66°03′E. A rock peak (595 metres (1,952 ft)) rising 0.2 miles (0.32 km) south of Mount Marsden in the Gustav Bull Mountains of Mac. Robertson Land. On February 13, 1931, the BANZARE (1929-31) under Douglas Mawson made a landing on nearby Scullin Monolith. They named this peak after Arthur R. Hinks, Secretary of the Royal Geographical Society, 1915–45.

=== Jaques Nunatak ===
67°53′S 66°12′E. A small nunatak lying 3 miles (4.8 km) south-southwest of Mount Kennedy in the Gustav Bull Mountains of Mac. Robertson Land. Mapped from ANARE air photos taken in 1936 and 1959. Named by ANCA for G.A. Jaques, a weather observer at Mawson Station in 1967.

=== Mount Kjerka ===
68°03′S 66°04′E. A mountain (865 metres (2,838 ft)) at the south end of the Gustav Bull Mountains, 11 miles (18 km) south of Mount Marsden, in Mac. Robertson Land. Mapped by Norwegian cartographers from aerial photographs taken by the Lars Christensen Expedition (1936-37) and named Kjerka (the church). Not: Church Mountain.

== Sources ==
- Alberts, Fred G., ed. (1995), Geographic Names of the Antarctic (PDF) (2 ed.), United States Board on Geographic Names This article incorporates public domain material from websites or documents of the United States Board on Geographic Names.
