= Scullin Monolith =

Monolith of Antarctica

Coordinates: 67°47′S 66°42′E

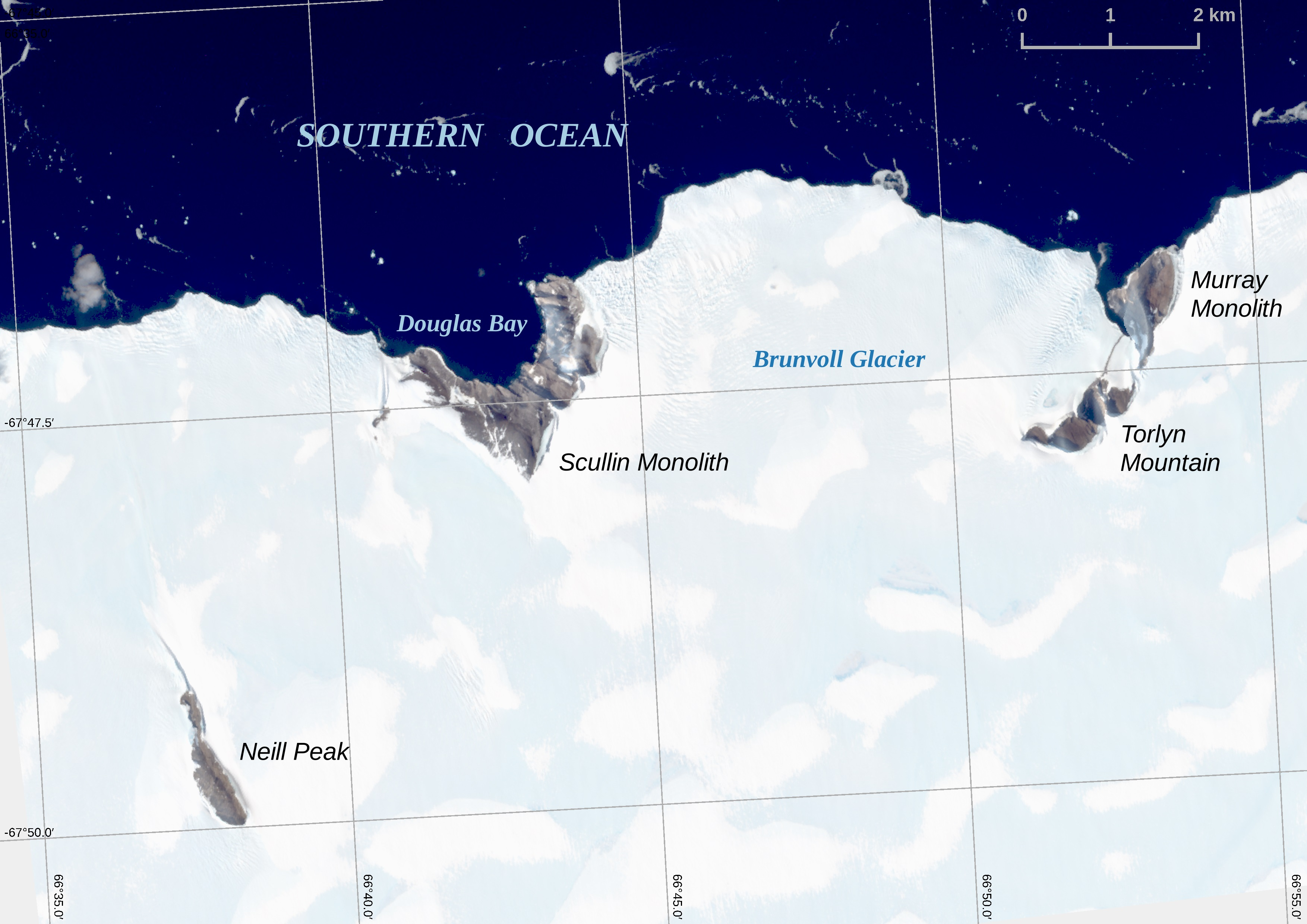
Scullin Monolith (center left).

Location in Antarctica

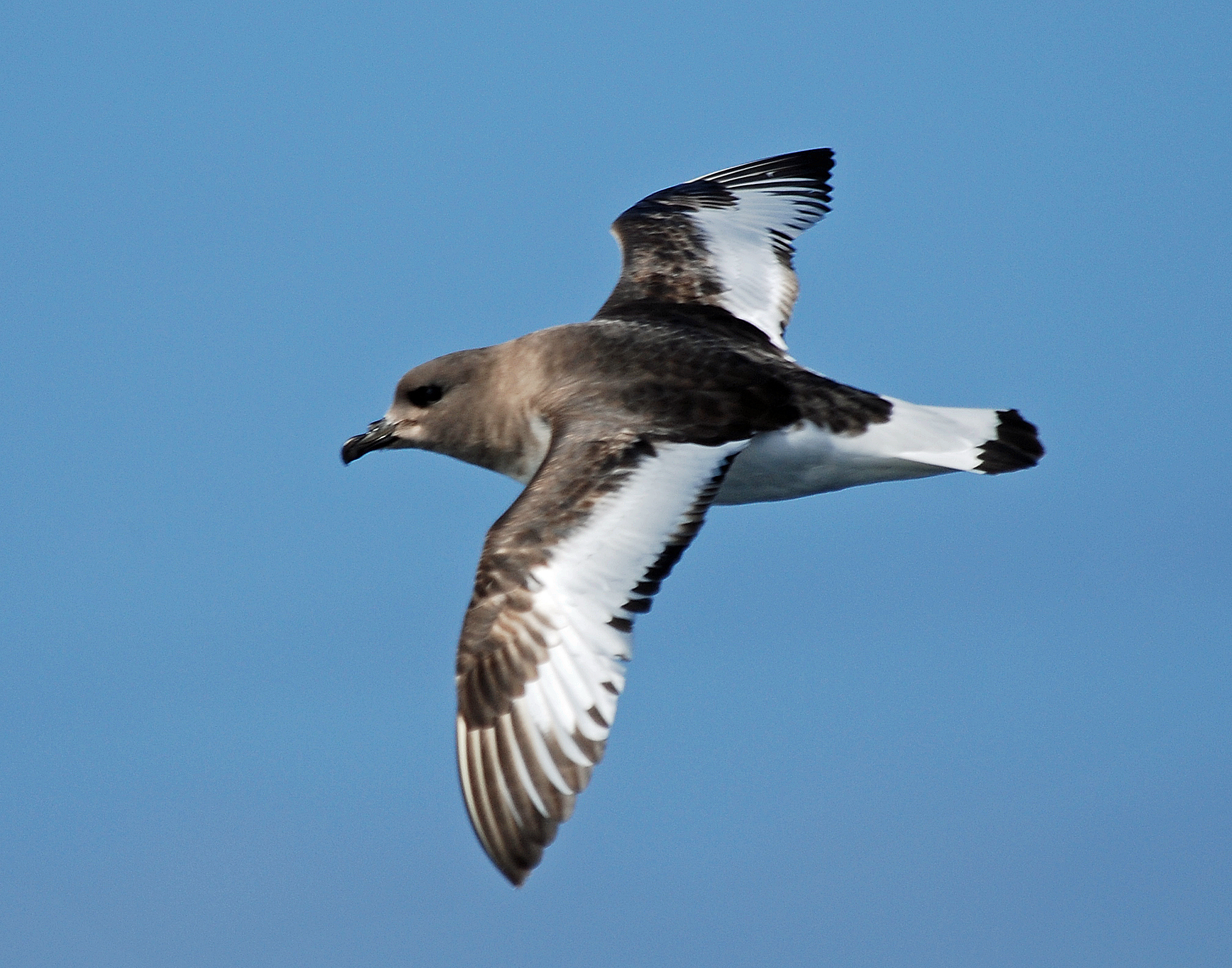
Antarctic petrels breed in the IBA

The Scullin Monolith is a crescent-shaped rock fronting the sea 6 km (3.7 mi) west of the similar Murray Monolith, and 8 km (5.0 mi) from Torlyn Mountain, in Mac. Robertson Land, Antarctica. It is a steep massif of metasedimentary gneiss and granitic origin, with the adjacent coastline consisting of 40 m high ice cliffs. The monolith rises steeply to extend from 435 m high Mikkelsen Peak westward in a crescent that forms Douglas Bay.

== Discovery and naming ==
Early in January 1930 the British Australian New Zealand Antarctic Research Expedition (BANZARE) under Douglas Mawson made an aerial flight from the ship over the area. Mawson set foot on the rock on 13 February 1931 and named it for James Scullin, Prime Minister of Australia in 1929 - 31. The rock was charted in January and February 1931 from Norwegian whale catchers exploring the coast, and named "Mount Klarius Mikkelsen" for Captain Klarius Mikkelsen, master of the whale catcher Torlyn. Mikkelsen Peak is retained as the name of the highest peak of the outcrop.

== Antarctic Specially Protected Area and Important Bird Area ==
As it is not covered in snow or ice, it is an important breeding ground for birds, particularly petrels. Together, Scullin and Murray monoliths hold the greatest concentration of seabird breeding colonies in East Antarctica, including at least 160,000 pairs of Antarctic petrels and 70,000 pairs of Adélie penguins. They are protected under the Antarctic Treaty System as Antarctic Specially Protected Area (ASPA) No.164. Coincident in coverage with ASPA 164, the two monoliths have also been designated an Important Bird Area (IBA) by BirdLife International because of the significant seabird colonies present.
