= Mac. Robertson Land =

Australian Antarctic claim

Location of Mac. Robertson Land (red), Australian Antarctic Territory in Antarctica.

Mac. Robertson Land is the portion of Antarctica lying southward of the coast between William Scoresby Bay and Cape Darnley. It is located at 70°00′S 65°00′E. In the east, Mac. Robertson Land includes the Prince Charles Mountains. It was named by the British Australian and New Zealand Antarctic Research Expedition (BANZARE) (1929–1931), under Sir Douglas Mawson, after Sir Macpherson Robertson of Melbourne, a patron of the expedition.

From 1965 onward, members of the SAE (Soviet Antarctic Expeditions) began undertaking geological fieldwork in the Prince Charles Mountains, eventually establishing a base, Soyuz Station, on the eastern shore of Beaver Lake in the northern Prince Charles Mountains.

== Nomenclature ==
Mac.Robertson Land (no space after Mac.) is the official Australian name, but it is known in the United States as Mac. Robertson Land and in Russia as MacRobertson Land.

== Features ==
As well as typical Antarctic geography, Mac. Robertson Land contains significant geographical features such as Tschuffert Peak, Poulton Peak, and Peak Seven; Cape Rouse, Tilley Bay, and Frustration Dome. Two of the most important of Mac. Robertson Land's landmarks are Soyuz Station, located in the Prince Charles Mountains, and the Amery Ice Shelf.

== Fauna and flora ==
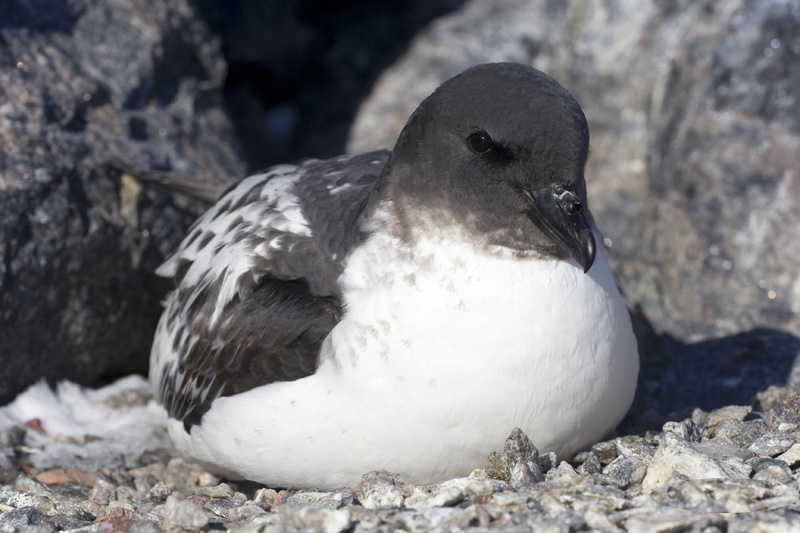
A close-up of a Cape petrel

The fauna of Mac. Robertson Land is dominated by avians and arthropods, the latter consisting of tardigrades and mites. Notable species include Adélie penguins, Cape petrels, and South polar skua. The flora, on the other hand, consists mainly of lichen and moss. (Note: These fauna and flora are found in the Prince Charles Mountains bioregion, which includes Mac. Robertson Land.)

The Australian polar station Mawson has been operating here since 1954.

== See also ==
- List of mountains of Mac. Robertson Land
