= December 1931 =

Month of 1931

<<	December 1931					>>
Su	Mo	Tu	We	Th	Fr	Sa
		1	2	3	4	5
6	7	8	9	10	11	12
13	14	15	16	17	18	19
20	21	22	23	24	25	26
27	28	29	30	31

The following events occurred in December 1931:

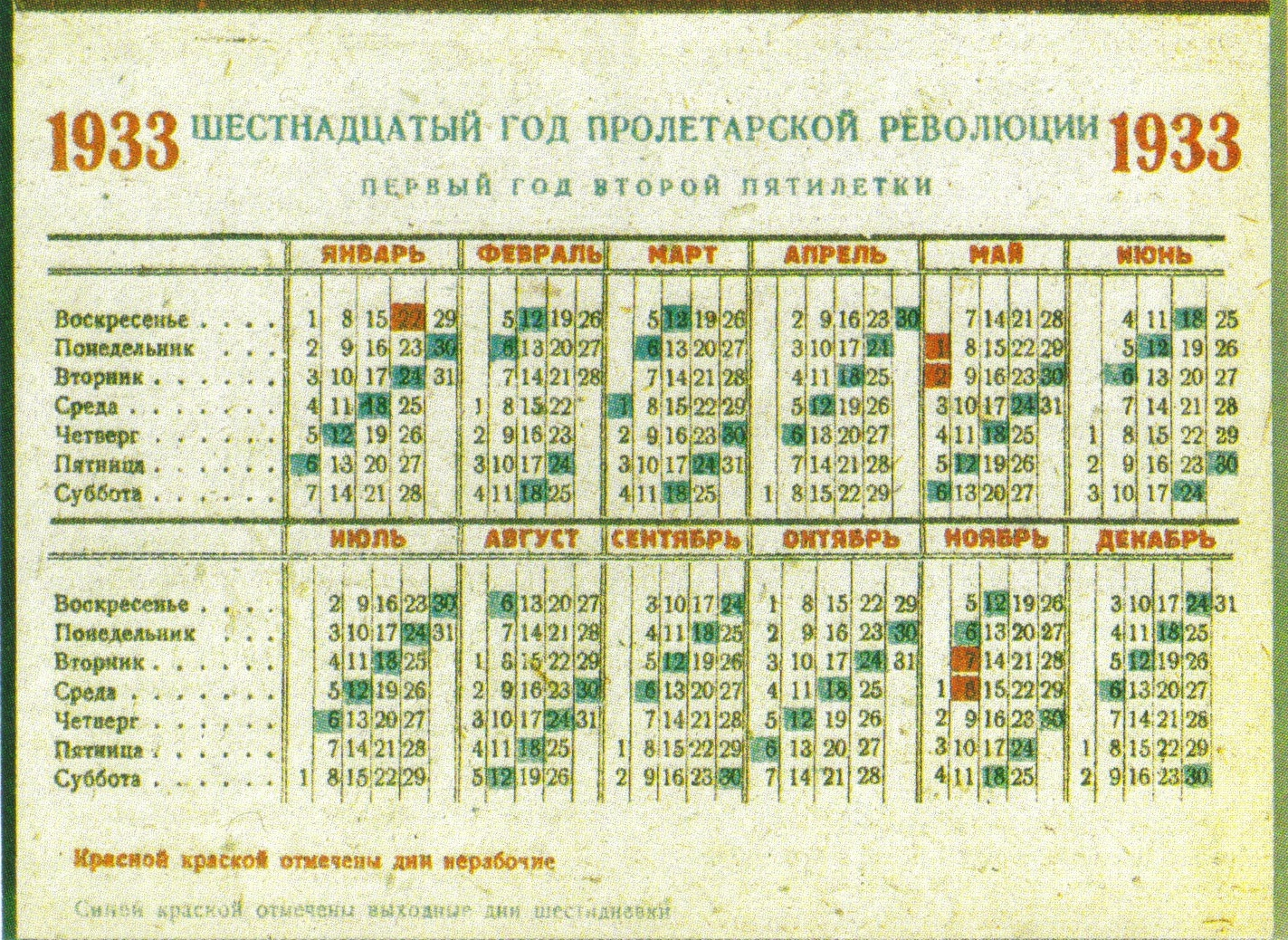
December 1, 1931: Soviet Union institutes new six-day week policy, allowing workers and children one day off (marked in blue) for every five days worked

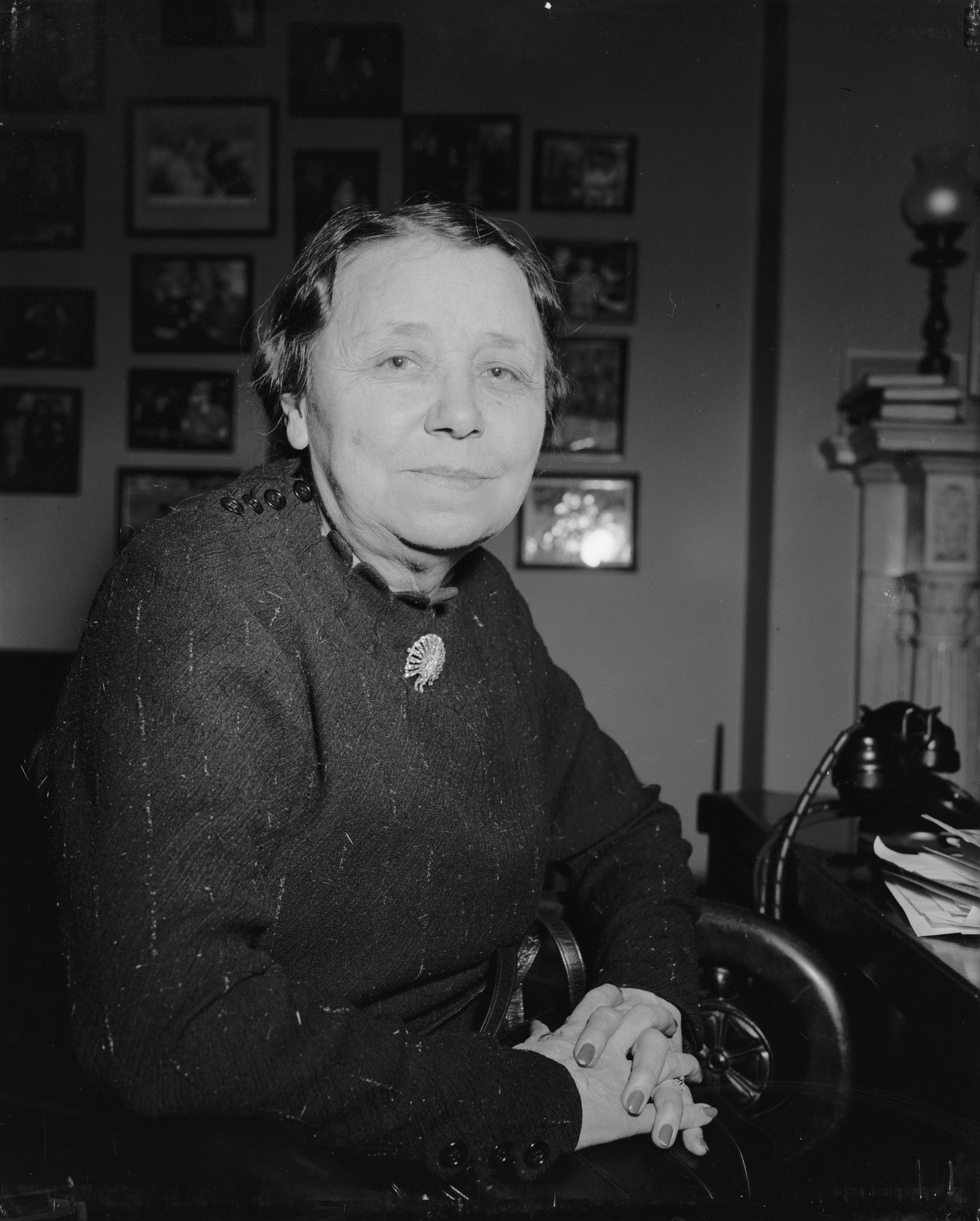
Hattie Caraway sworn into office as United States Senator for Arkansas, only the second woman to hold office in the U.S. Senate

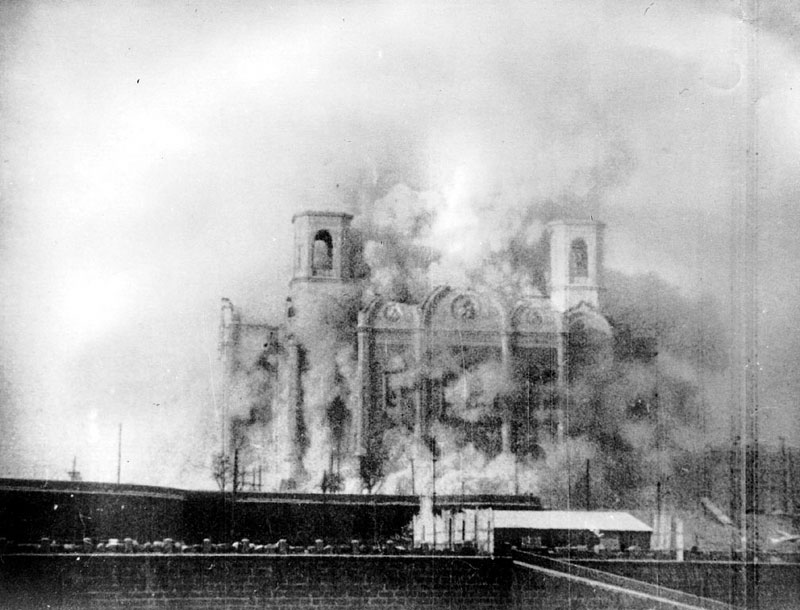
December 5, 1931: Soviet government tears down Moscow's Cathedral of Christ the Savior to make way for planned Palace of the Soviets, never constructed

== December 1, 1931 (Tuesday) ==
- A revision in the Soviet calendar went into effect, replacing the five-day work week with a new six-day system.
- The second Round Table Conference on India broke off in London without success.
- Born: Jimmy Lyons, alto saxophonist, in Jersey City, New Jersey (d. 1986); Jim Nesbitt, country music singer, in Bishopville, South Carolina (d. 2007)

== December 2, 1931 (Wednesday) ==
- A general election was held in New Zealand; the United/Reform Coalition lost some seats but remained in power.
- Born:
  - Nigel Calder, Scottish science writer and documentary producer; in Edinburgh (d. 2014)
  - Edwin Meese, United States Attorney General from 1985 to 1988; in Oakland, California
  - Gareth Wigan, British-born American producer, talent agent and filmmaker; in London (d. 2010)
- Died: Vincent d'Indy, 80, French composer and teacher

== December 3, 1931 (Thursday) ==
- Alka-Seltzer was first brought on the market by the Dr. Miles Medical Company.
- The film Blonde Crazy starring James Cagney was released.
- Born: Jaye P. Morgan (stage name for Mary Margaret Morgan), American singer and actress; in Mancos, Colorado

== December 4, 1931 (Friday) ==
- Adolf Hitler gave an interview to British and American press at the Hotel Kaiserhof in Berlin. "It will not be necessary for me to seize power through a coup d'état", Hitler said. "It will be mine within a short time, anyway, since every election brings my party closer to an absolute majority."

== December 5, 1931 (Saturday) ==
- The Mahatma Gandhi left England to head back to India. "I return with a clear conscience", Gandhi said. "I have explored and exhausted every approach to peace." That evening in Paris, Gandhi gave a speech at the Magic-City dance hall and took questions from the audience of 2,000 people.
- The Montreal AAA Winged Wheelers defeated the Regina Roughriders 22–0 to win the Grey Cup of Canadian football.
- The Cathedral of Christ the Saviour in Moscow was demolished. The Palace of the Soviets was intended to be built in its place but never completed. At the end of the 20th century, after the fall of Communism, the cathedral would be rebuilt in the same spot and with the same architectural plans, and opened in 2000.
- Died: Vachel Lindsay, 52, well-known American poet, killed himself by drinking a bottle of potassium hydroxide or lye.

== December 6, 1931 (Sunday) ==
- Marģers Skujenieks became Prime Minister of Latvia for the second time.
- Five coal miners were killed in an explosion, and 14 injured in Transylvania in Romania.

== December 7, 1931 (Monday) ==
- The resignation of Giovanni Giuriati as Secretary of the National Fascist Party was announced in Italy; Achille Starace was appointed to replace him.
- The John Ford-directed drama film Arrowsmith premiered at the Gaiety Theatre in New York City.

== December 8, 1931 (Tuesday) ==
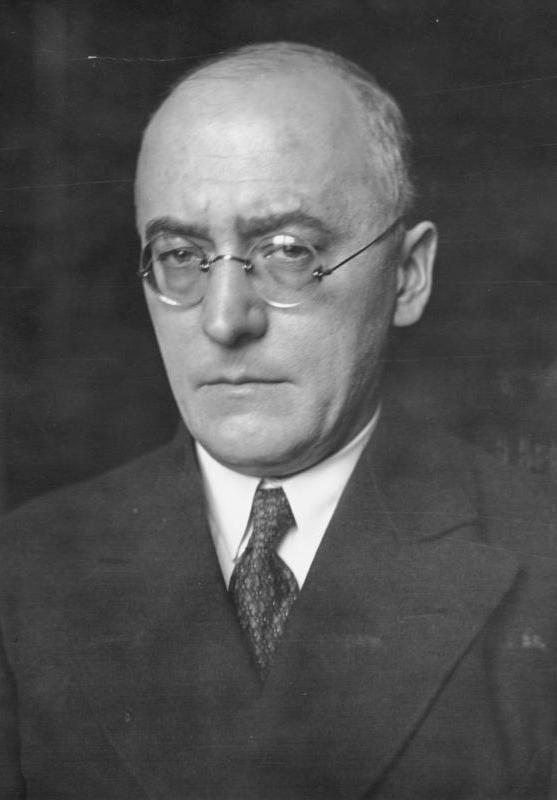
Chancellor Bruening

- German President Paul von Hindenburg signed Chancellor Heinrich Brüning's enormous 46-page emergency decree into law, slashing prices, wages and rents across the board in an effort to reverse inflation.
- Hattie Caraway of Arkansas was sworn in as a United States senator, filling the vacancy left by her late husband Thaddeus. This made Caraway the second woman in history to serve in the U.S. Senate, after Rebecca Latimer Felton in 1922, although Felton's service had consisted of only a single day and was largely symbolic. In 1932, while serving out the remainder of her late husband's term, she became the first woman to be elected as a U.S. Senator.
- Herbert Hoover delivered the annual State of the Union message to Congress. The message reviewed the worldwide depression and laid out the measures the government was taking to alleviate the crisis, but made no mention of Prohibition.

== December 9, 1931 (Wednesday) ==
- The Spanish Constituent Assembly approved the new Spanish Constitution.
- Born: Ladislav Smoljak, film and theatre director, actor and screenwriter, in Prague, Czechoslovakia (d. 2010)

== December 10, 1931 (Thursday) ==
- The 1931 Nobel Prizes were awarded in Stockholm. The recipients were Carl Bosch and Friedrich Bergius of Germany for Chemistry, Otto Heinrich Warburg of Germany (Medicine) and Erik Axel Karlfeldt of Sweden (Literature). The Peace Prize was awarded in Oslo to Jane Addams and Nicholas Murray Butler of the United States. The Physics Prize was not awarded that year.
- In Clarksburg, West Virginia, Harry Powers was convicted of first degree murder, which automatically carried a sentence of the death penalty. He would be hanged on March 18.
- The Alfred Hitchcock-directed film Rich and Strange was released in the United Kingdom.
- The final D. W. Griffith-directed film, The Struggle, was released.

== December 11, 1931 (Friday) ==
- The Statute of Westminster was passed, establishing increased independence of the self-governing Dominions of the British Empire.
- Niceto Alcalá-Zamora was sworn in as the first President of the Second Republic of Spain.
- The Chicago Cubs traded Hack Wilson and Bud Teachout to the St. Louis Cardinals for Burleigh Grimes.
- Born: Rita Moreno (stage name for Rosa Alverio), Puerto Rican film, stage and TV actress and singer, winner of the Oscar, Tony, Emmy and Grammy awards; in Humacao, Puerto Rico

== December 12, 1931 (Saturday) ==
- Mahatma Gandhi met with Benito Mussolini in Rome. The two talked for half an hour through an interpreter.
- Army defeated Navy 17–7 in the Army–Navy Game at Yankee Stadium.

== December 13, 1931 (Sunday) ==
- Inukai Tsuyoshi became Prime Minister of Japan.
- Winston Churchill was hit by a car driven by Edward F. Cantasano while crossing Fifth Avenue in New York City. Churchill went to the hospital with some bruises and cuts but was discharged the following week. Cantasano was not charged because Churchill took full responsibility for the accident, having crossed against the light and forgotten which side of the road automobiles drive on in the United States.

== December 14, 1931 (Monday) ==
- Walter Pfrimer and seven other Heimwehr leaders went on trial for high treason in Graz, Austria over the September 13 Styrian revolt.
- Born: Arsenio Laurel, Philippine race car driver, in Tanauan, Batangas (killed in racing accident, 1967)

== December 15, 1931 (Tuesday) ==
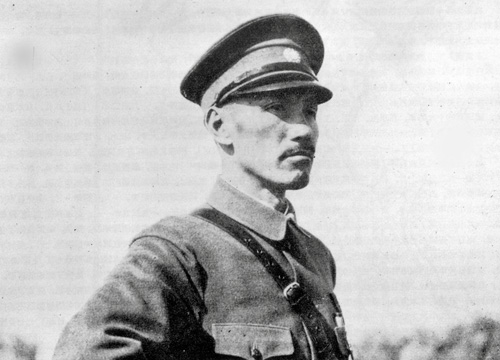
Chiang Kai-shek

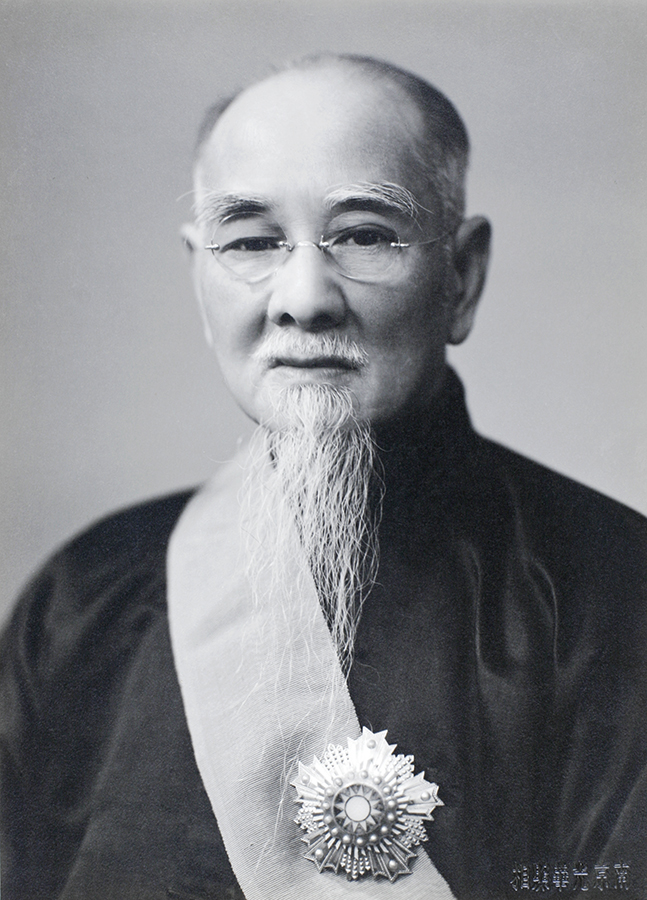
President Lin Sen

- Chiang Kai-shek resigned as President of the Republic of China and was succeeded by Lin Sen.
- Born: Evald Schorm, Czech film and stage director, screenwriter and actor, in Prague (d. 1988)

== December 16, 1931 (Wednesday) ==
- The Iron Front, an anti-fascist paramilitary organization, formed in Germany.

== December 17, 1931 (Thursday) ==
- Japan suspended the gold standard.
- Born: Dave Madden, Canadian-born American TV actor known for The Partridge Family; in Sarnia, Ontario (d. 2014)

== December 18, 1931 (Friday) ==
- A jury acquitted Walter Pfrimer and his associates of treason charges.
- Died: Legs Diamond, 34, American gangster, was shot and killed in his girlfriend's apartment by a rival gang.

== December 19, 1931 (Saturday) ==
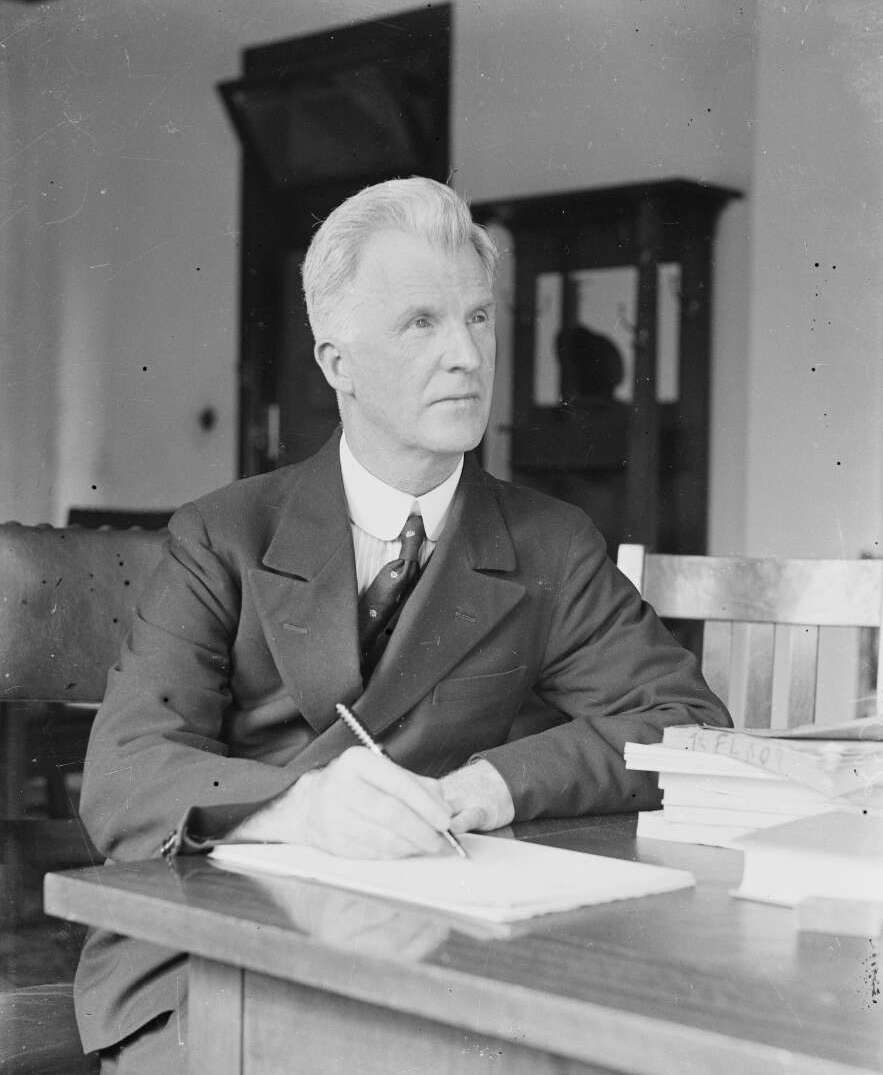
Defeated Prime Minister Scullin

- Elections were held in Australia for all 75 seats in the Australian House of Representatives and half (18 of 26) of the seats of the Australian Senate. The Australian Labor Party, which had had a majority (46 of the 75 seats) and was led by Prime Minister James Scullin, lost all but 14 of the races, while the newly formed United Australia Party, led by Joseph Lyons, won 39 seats and control of the House.
- Joseph Goebbels married Magda Quandt on the estate of Magda's first husband, Günther Quandt, in Severin. Adolf Hitler served as best man.

== December 20, 1931 (Sunday) ==
- The Kragujevac Football Subassociation was formed.
- Born: Mala Powers, American film actress, in San Francisco (d. 2007)
- Died:
  - Gustav Kossinna, 73, German linguist and archaeology professor
  - Rosa C. Petherick, 60, British book illustrator

== December 21, 1931 (Monday) ==
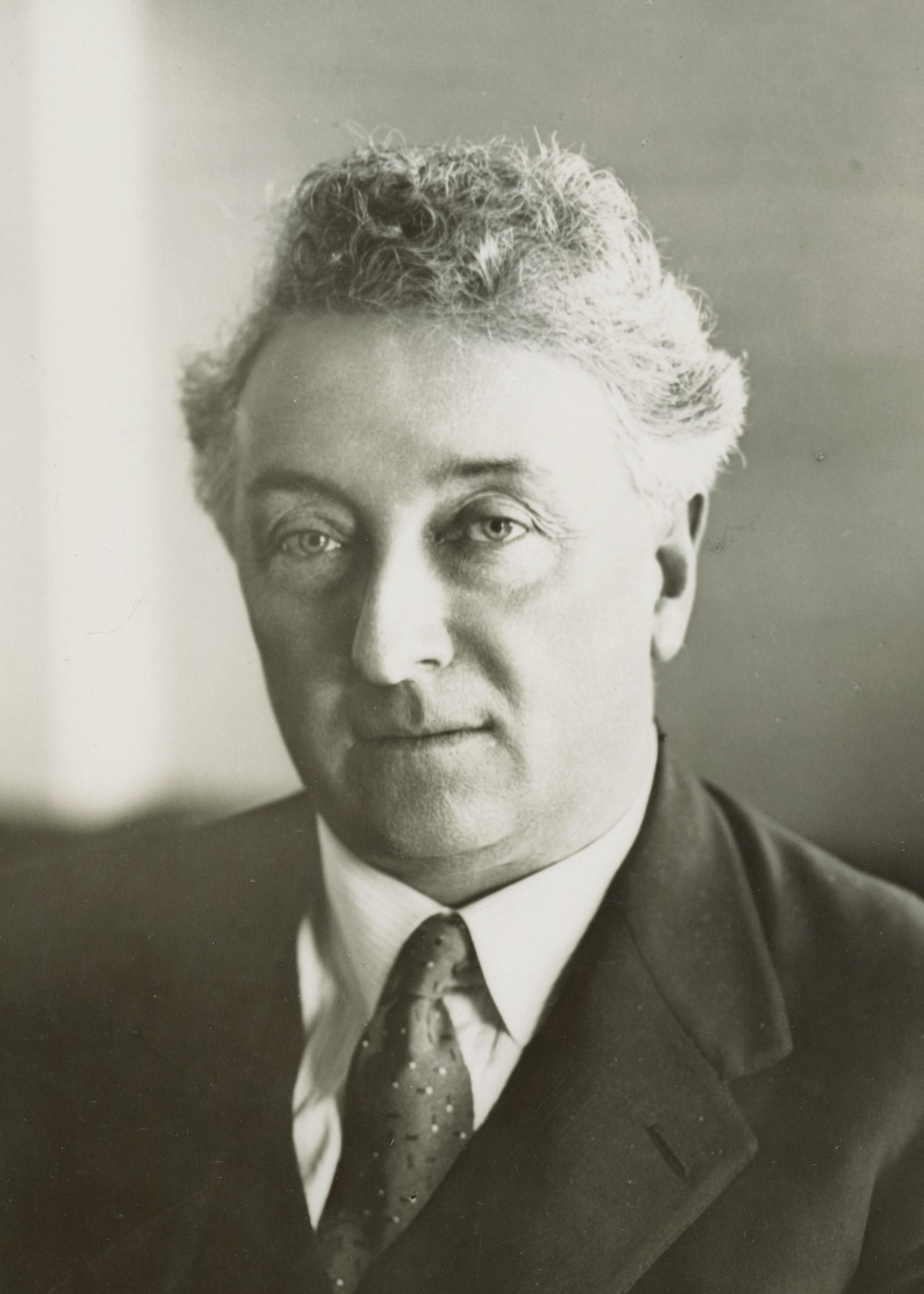
New Australian Prime Minister Joe Lyons

- Joseph Lyons became the new Prime Minister of Australia as James Scullin resigned in the wake of the election results.
- Japanese forces in Manchuria launched a new offensive, the Jinzhou Operation.

== December 22, 1931 (Tuesday) ==
- The roof of the Vatican Library partially collapsed, killing five and destroying 800 books.

== December 23, 1931 (Wednesday) ==
- In Basel, the Young Plan advisory committee issued a report stating that Germany would be unable to meet its reparations payments when the Hoover Moratorium expired in July, and that the only solution was another revision to the plan.
- Born: Ronnie Schell, American actor and comedian, in Richmond, California
- Died:
  - Knowlton Ames, 63, American football player and college football coach, later a financier, shot himself after financial reverses during the Great Depression.
  - Tyrone Power, Sr., 62, English stage and film actor, died of a heart attack.

== December 24, 1931 (Thursday) ==
- Twenty people were injured in Paris when several hundred unemployed rioters invaded a Montmartre café and smashed tables and chairs, shouting for "work and bread".
- Born: Mauricio Kagel, Argentine composer; in Buenos Aires (d. 2008)
- Died: Carlo Fornasini, Italian micropalaeontologist; in Bologna (b. 1854)

== December 25, 1931 (Friday) ==
- The first Metropolitan Opera network radio broadcast took place when the Engelbert Humperdinck opera Hansel and Gretel aired on NBC.
- The film Hell Divers, starring Wallace Beery and Clark Gable, premiered at Grauman's Chinese Theatre in Hollywood.

== December 26, 1931 (Saturday) ==
- The George and Ira Gershwin musical Of Thee I Sing premiered at the Music Box Theatre on Broadway.
- The film Mata Hari, starring Greta Garbo in the title role, was released.
- Died: Melvil Dewey, 80, American librarian who invented the Dewey Decimal System for classifying library books by number

== December 27, 1931 (Sunday) ==
- Indian independence leader Jawaharlal Nehru was arrested.
- Born: Scotty Moore, American guitarist and recording engineer; in Gadsden, Tennessee (d. 2016)
- Died: José Figueroa Alcorta, 71, President of Argentina from 1906 to 1910, later the Chief Justice of Argentina's Supreme Court of Justice from 1929 until his death

== December 28, 1931 (Monday) ==
- The Mahatma Gandhi returned to India, docking at Bombay. A huge crowd was there to greet him despite the very early morning hour.
- Sections of Los Angeles flooded after five days of rain.
- Born: Martin Milner, American film and TV actor known as the star of two series, Route 66 and later for Adam-12; in Detroit (d. 2015)

== December 29, 1931 (Tuesday) ==
- The Deseret News Publishing Company was founded.

== December 30, 1931 (Wednesday) ==
- A two-day referendum on prohibition concluded in Finland. 70.5% voted to abolish prohibition completely.
- The Sippenbuch, the genealogical clan book carried by every member of the SS, was created.
- Born: Skeeter Davis (stage name for Mary Frances Penick), American country music singer; in Dry Ridge, Kentucky (d. 2004)

== December 31, 1931 (Thursday) ==
- German President Paul von Hindenburg gave a New Year's address over the radio. "Germans deserve thanks and praise for the sacrifices they have made and the patience with which they have borne their sufferings and burdens", Hindenburg said. "The greatness of their sacrifice justifies Germany's demand that foreign countries should not seek to oppose Germany's restoration through imposition of impossible conditions." At one point during Hindenburg's address the broadcast was hijacked and an unknown voice called out, "Attention Germany! The Red fighters are here."
- In the Northwest Territories of Canada near Aklavik, four members of the Royal Canadian Mounted Police trekked to the cabin of a mysterious man by the name of Albert Johnson with a search warrant after Aboriginal trappers suspected him of interfering with their traps. When they knocked on Johnson's cabin door he responded with gunfire, seriously wounding one of the Mounties in the ensuing shootout. Johnson now faced the more serious charge of attempted murder of an RCMP officer.
- The film Dr. Jekyll and Mr. Hyde starring Fredric March was released.
- Born: Bob Shaw, Northern Irish science fiction writer; in Belfast (d. 1996)
