= October 1931 =

Month of 1931

<<	October 1931					>>
Su	Mo	Tu	We	Th	Fr	Sa
				1	2	3
4	5	6	7	8	9	10
11	12	13	14	15	16	17
18	19	20	21	22	23	24
25	26	27	28	29	30	31

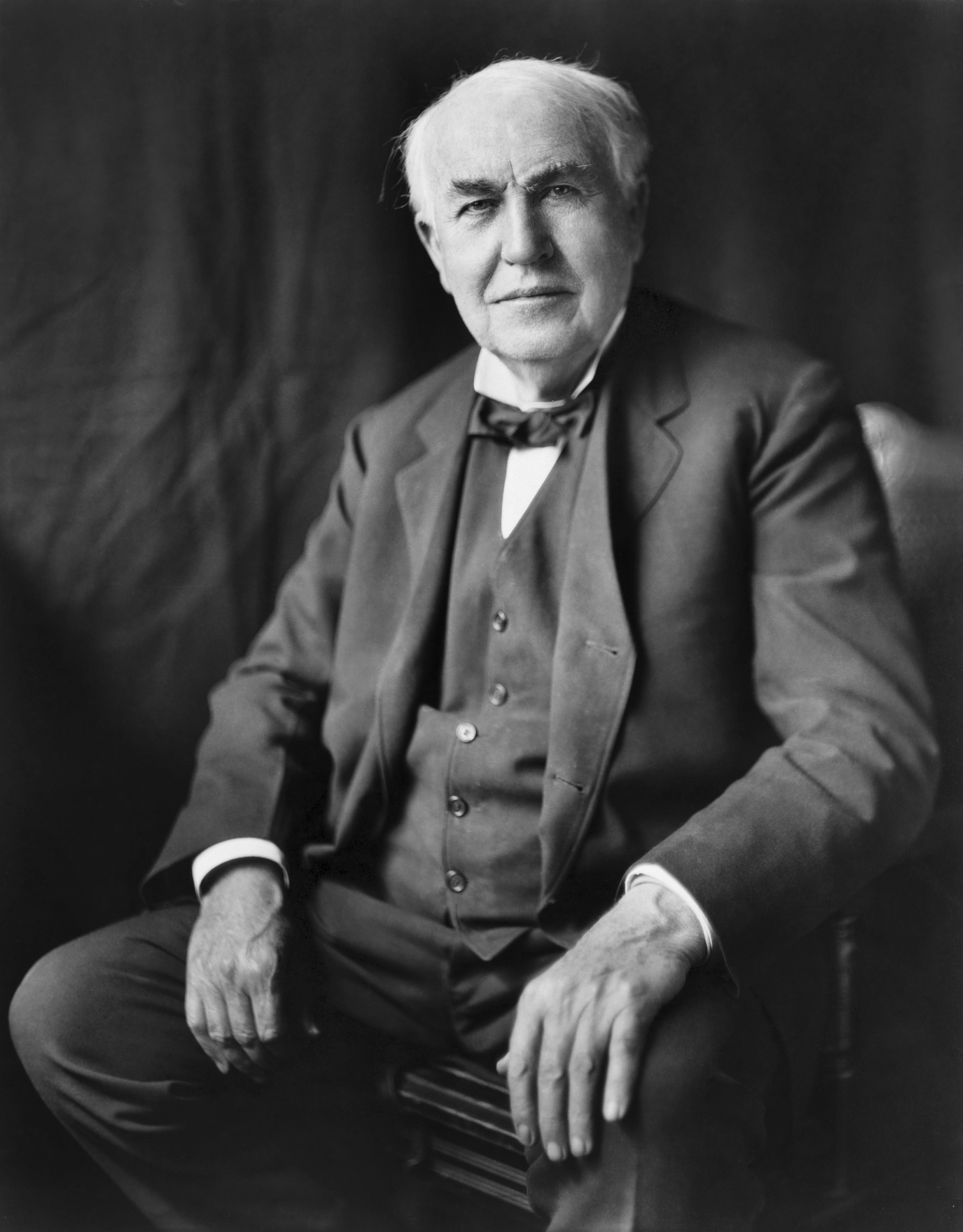
October 21, 1931: Streetlights turned off for one minute across the U.S.A. in honor of the late Thomas Edison

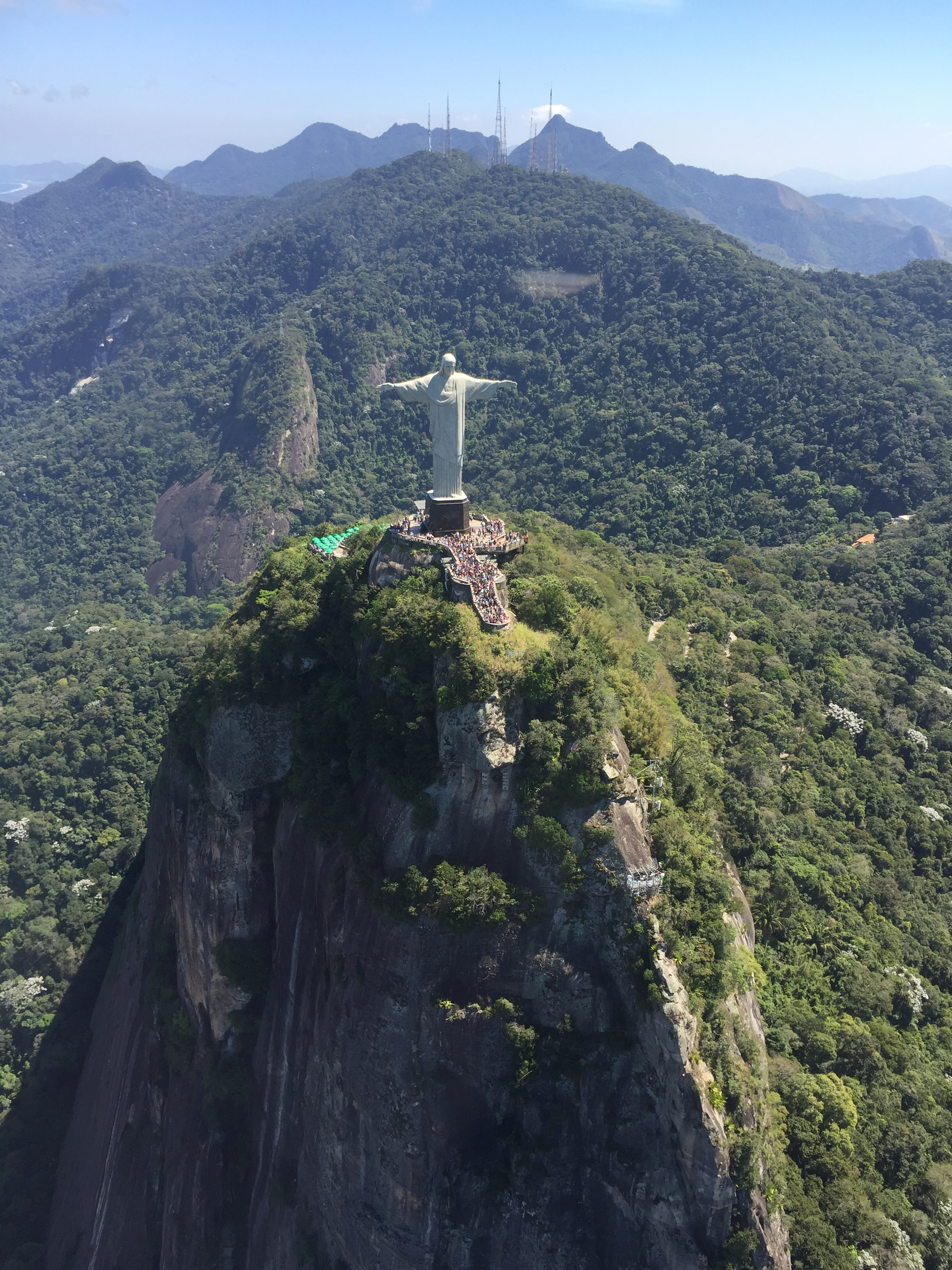
October 12, 1931: Christ the Redeemer statue, 93 feet tall, dedicated in Rio de Janeiro

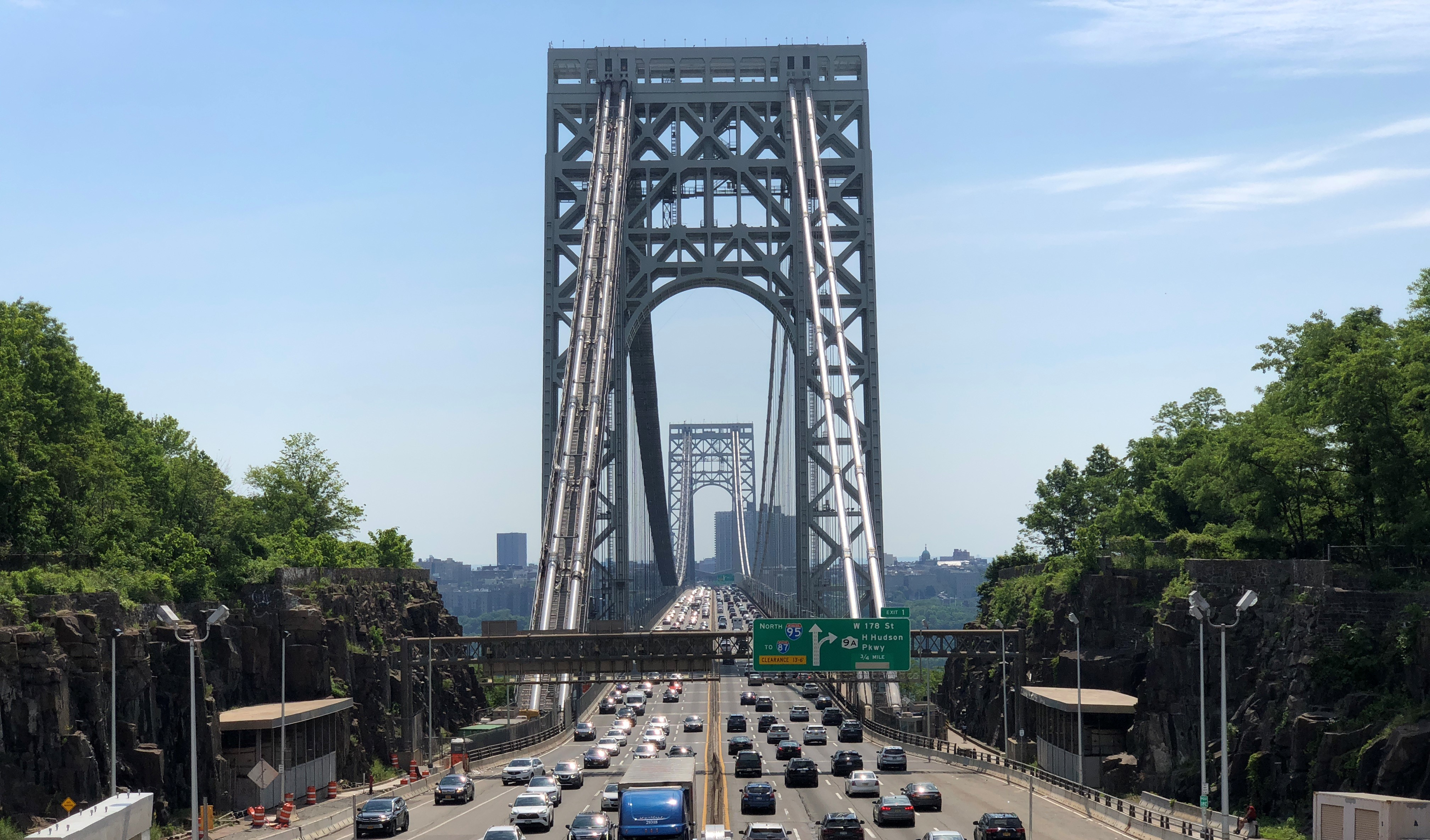
October 24, 1931: George Washington Bridge links New York City and New Jersey

The following events occurred in October 1931:

== October 1, 1931 (Thursday) ==
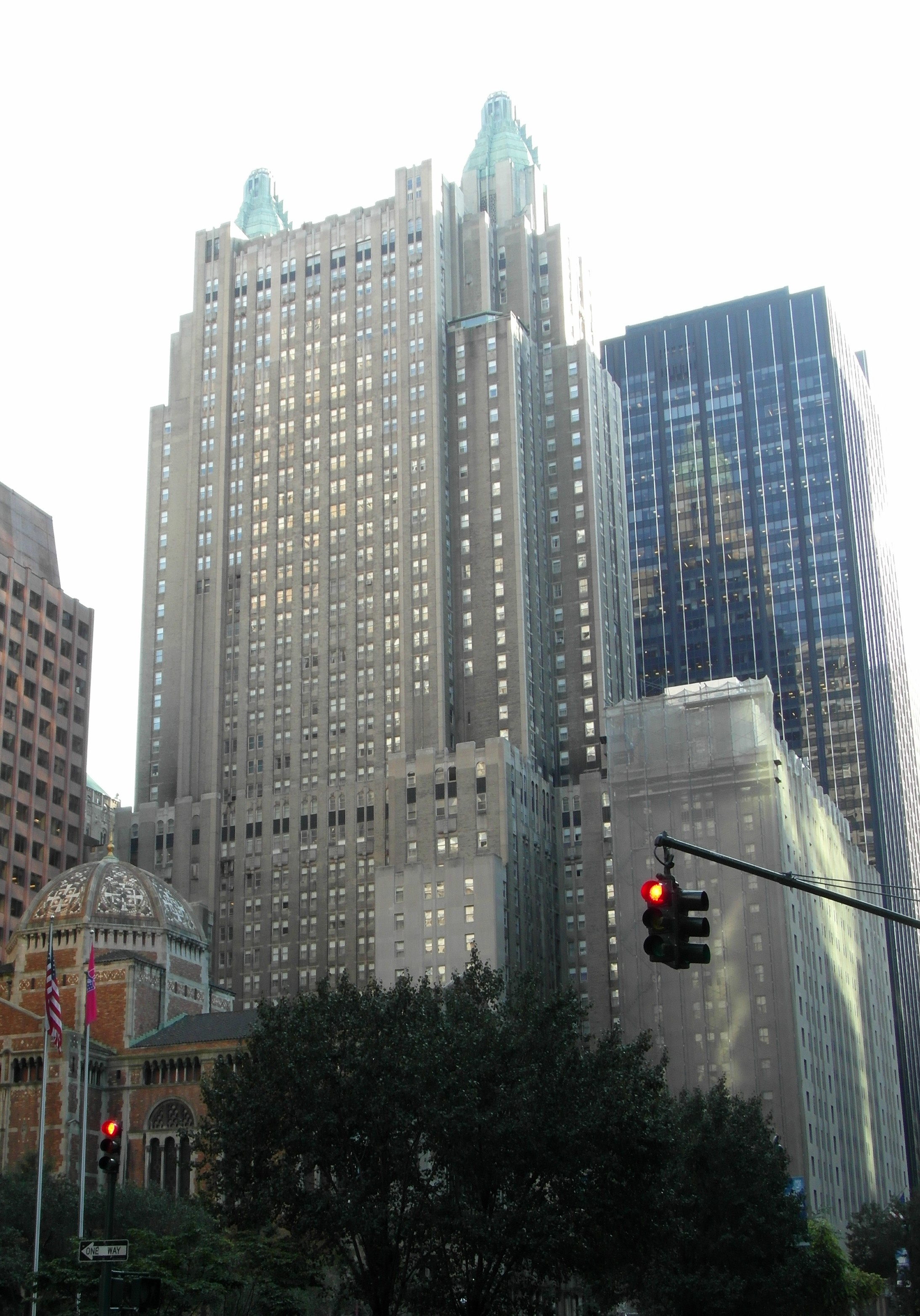
The Waldorf-Astoria in 2012

- The new Waldorf Astoria building opened at 301 Park Avenue in New York City, after the former hotel located at 350 Fifth Avenue had been demolished in 1929 to make way for the Empire State Building. At the time, the building was the largest and tallest hotel in the world.
- Rioting broke out in Glasgow in Scotland when police stopped a crowd protesting against unemployment from marching on Glasgow Green. MP John McGovern was among those arrested for hitting a policeman. A similar event took place in Salford, England where protesters against unemployment, cuts in unemployment benefits and the "means test" clashed with police.
- Born: Alan Wagner, television executive and opera critic, in Harlem, New York City (d. 2007)

== October 2, 1931 (Friday) ==
- Riots continued in Glasgow as a crowd estimated at 50,000 people fought police, with some looting shops and smashing windows.
- Pope Pius XI promulgated a new encyclical, Nova Impendet, which called for a "Crusade of charity and of succour" to help the unemployed and poor, especially the children who "are bearing the worst of the burden."

== October 3, 1931 (Saturday) ==
- Two Albanian officers were sentenced for the February 20 assassination attempt of King Zog. A former lieutenant was sentenced to seven years and a former army captain was sentenced to three years.
- Born:
  - Denise Scott Brown, Southern African-born American architect, in Nkana, Northern Rhodesia
  - Glenn Hall, Canadian ice hockey goaltender, in Humboldt, Saskatchewan (d. 2026)
- Died: Carl Nielsen, 66, Danish composer

== October 4, 1931 (Sunday) ==
- Incumbent Chilean president Juan Esteban Montero was re-elected.
- The Socialist Workers' Party of Germany was founded.
- The comic strip Dick Tracy, written by Chester Gould and featuring the adventures of a police detective, made its debut. Originally called Plainclothes Tracy, the strip appeared in the Detroit Mirror.

== October 5, 1931 (Monday) ==
- Clyde Pangborn and Hugh Herndon Jr. completed the first nonstop flight across the Pacific Ocean, making a controlled crash landing of their plane, Miss Veedol, near Wenatchee, Washington 41 hours after taking off from Misawa, Japan.
- Died: Dwight Morrow, 58, American businessman, ambassador and senator

== October 6, 1931 (Tuesday) ==
- British Prime Minister Ramsay MacDonald called a new general election for October 27.
- U.S. President Herbert Hoover announced that the country's bankers were forming a $500 million privately financed national institution to help banks extend credit.
- Al Capone went on trial for tax evasion.
- German Chancellor Heinrich Brüning and his entire cabinet resigned. President Paul von Hindenburg accepted the resignations but asked Brüning to stay on and form a new government.
- Niceto Alcalá-Zamora resigned as Spain's President of the Council of Ministers in a fit of anger after being accused of speaking out of turn. He withdrew his resignation fifteen minutes later.
- Born: Riccardo Giacconi, Italian astrophysicist and Nobel laureate, in Genoa (d. 2018)

== October 7, 1931 (Wednesday) ==
- A mob of unemployed demonstrators in Manchester were repulsed trying to storm Town Hall while the council was in session. The protestors then sat in the street and refused to budge until they were dispersed by police batons and fire hoses. A total of 14 people were injured, including 5 police.
- Born:
  - Desmond Tutu, South African social rights activist, Anglican bishop and Nobel Peace Prize recipient, in Klerksdorp (d. 2021)
  - Cotton Fitzsimmons, American basketball coach, in Hannibal, Missouri (d. 2004)

== October 8, 1931 (Thursday) ==
- Benito Mussolini reviewed a huge parade of 40,000 Fascist youths in Rome.
- William Walton's cantata Belshazzar's Feast was performed for the first time in Leeds.
- The Women's Industrial Service League was organized in the United States.
- The early television show Piano Lessons first aired on W2XAB in New York.

== October 9, 1931 (Friday) ==
- Chancellor Brüning announced his new cabinet. The only changes were Curt Joël as Justice Minister, Hermann Warmbold as Minister of Economics and Brüning naming himself the new Foreign Minister.
- Denmark held a state funeral for Carl Nielsen.

== October 10, 1931 (Saturday) ==
- The St. Louis Cardinals won the World Series in seven games with a 4–2 win over the Philadelphia Athletics.
- Adolf Hitler met with President Hindenburg for the first time, accompanied by Hermann Göring. The private meeting lasted over an hour but was not productive.
- Szilveszter Matuska was arrested in Austria for causing a train derailment in Hungary, near Biatorbágy, that had killed 22 people and injured 120 others on September 13. Sentenced to life imprisonment in Hungary after extradition, Matuska escaped from prison in Vác in 1945 and was never recaptured.
- The film Alone, written and directed by Leonid Trauberg and Grigori Kozintsev, premiered in the Soviet Union.

== October 11, 1931 (Sunday) ==
- A conference of Germany's right-wing factions, including the Nazis and Alfred Hugenberg's DNVP, met in Bad Harzburg to discuss how to defeat the Brüning government. An alliance was formed that became known as the Harzburg Front.

== October 12, 1931 (Monday) ==
- The famous Christ the Redeemer statue, 98 feet (30 m) tall and overlooking the city of Rio de Janeiro from Corcovado Mountain, was dedicated.

== October 13, 1931 (Tuesday) ==
- The Nazi and National People's parties ended their eight-month boycott of the Reichstag.
- The Noël Coward play Cavalcade premiered at Drury Lane.
- Lieut. Gov. Paul N. Cyr had himself sworn in as Governor of Louisiana, saying Huey Long could not hold office as a state governor and U.S. senator at the same time.
- Born: Eddie Mathews, U.S. baseball player, in Texarkana, Texas (d. 2001)
- Died: Ernst Didring, 62, Swedish author

== October 14, 1931 (Wednesday) ==
- Manuel Azaña became Prime Minister of Spain.

== October 15, 1931 (Thursday) ==
- The stage musical The Cat and the Fiddle, with music by Jerome Kern and lyrics and book by Otto Harbach, premiered at the Globe Theatre on Broadway.
- Born:
  - A. P. J. Abdul Kalam, 11th President of India; in Rameswaram, British India (d. 2015)
  - Freddy Cole, American jazz musician; in Chicago (d. 2020)

== October 16, 1931 (Friday) ==
- Germany's Chancellor Brüning survived a confidence vote in the Reichstag by a count of 295 to 270. The Nazis and DNVP walked out again after the vote was taken. "We will return only when there exists the possibility of preventing especially wicked measures directed against our people", Wilhelm Frick declared.
- Born:
  - Charles Colson, Special Counsel to U.S. President Nixon and one of the Watergate Seven; in Boston (d. 2012)
  - James Chace, American historian; in Fall River, Massachusetts (d. 2004)
  - Rosa Rosal, Filipina actress; in Manila

== October 17, 1931 (Saturday) ==
- In fighting between Nazis and Communists in Braunschweig, 100 people were injured.
- Born:
  - José Alencar, Brazilian businessman and politician, in Muriaé (d. 2011)
  - Ernst Hinterberger, Austrian writer; in Vienna (d. 2012)
- Died: Carin Göring, 42, the first wife of Hermann Göring, died of heart failure

== October 18, 1931 (Sunday) ==
- Al Capone was convicted of three felony counts of tax evasion and two misdemeanor counts of failing to file a tax return.
- Two died in another day of rioting between Nazis and Communists in Braunschweig as 75,000 Nazis paraded in the city before Hitler.
- Died: Thomas Edison, 84, American inventor and businessman

== October 19, 1931 (Monday) ==
- The dismembered bodies of two women stuffed into two trunks and a suitcase were uncovered at the Southern Pacific station in Los Angeles. Dr. William Judd was taken into custody as detectives began a search for his wife, Winnie Ruth Judd.
- Born:
  - John le Carré (pen name for David Cornwell); English spy novelist, in Poole, Dorset (d. 2020)
  - Manolo Escobar, Spanish singer and actor, in El Ejido, Almeria province (d. 2013)

== October 20, 1931 (Tuesday) ==
- Mahatma Gandhi visited Chatham House in London and gave a talk on 'The Future of India'.
- Frankie Frisch of the St. Louis Cardinals was named the Most Valuable Player of baseball's National League. This was the first year that the Baseball Writers' Association of America gave out the award, since the leagues themselves stopped naming MVPs after 1929.
- Born:
  - Mickey Mantle, American baseball player and Hall of Fame enshrinee; in Spavinaw, Oklahoma (d. 1995);
  - Morris Cerullo, American Pentecostal televangelist; in Passaic, New Jersey (d. 2020)
  - Alexander Plisetski, Soviet Russian ballet master and choreographer, in Moscow (d. 1985)
- Died: Emánuel Moór, 68, Hungarian composer, pianist and inventor of the Moór Pianoforte

== October 21, 1931 (Wednesday) ==
- On the day of Thomas Edison's funeral, Americans were asked (at the request of U.S. President Hoover) to turn off the lights in their homes at 10:00 p.m. Eastern time for one minute to mourn his passing. In many cases, city government's turned off the streetlights for a full minute.
- Died: Arthur Schnitzler, 69, Austrian author and dramatist

== October 22, 1931 (Thursday) ==
- The League of Nations drafted a statement ordering Japan to withdraw from Manchuria by November 16.
- French Prime Minister Pierre Laval arrived in Washington for talks with President Hoover.

== October 23, 1931 (Friday) ==
- Japan rejected the League of Nations ultimatum.
- Winnie Ruth Judd surrendered to Los Angeles police.
- Born:
  - Jim Bunning, American baseball pitcher and Hall of Fame inductee, later a U.S. Senator; in Southgate, Kentucky (d. 2017)
  - Diana Dors, English film and television actress, in Swindon, Wiltshire (died from ovarian cancer, 1984)

== October 24, 1931 (Saturday) ==
- The opening ceremony was held for the George Washington Bridge connecting Manhattan to New Jersey. Governors Franklin D. Roosevelt of New York and Morgan Larson of New Jersey inaugurated the bridge in front of 30,000 spectators.
- A mysterious submarine sinking occurred in the Gulf of Finland. Initial reports indicated that a Soviet submarine hit a German steamer and sank with the loss of all 50 crew, but a Soviet report said all the lives had been saved. The unidentified submarine was reportedly the old British HMS L55, which sank in 1919 but was raised by the Soviets in 1928.
- Born: Sofia Gubaidulina, Tatar Russian composer; in Chistopol, Tatar ASSR, Soviet Union (d. 2025)
- Died: Sir Murray Bisset, 55, South African cricketer and later the British Governor of Southern Rhodesia

== October 25, 1931 (Sunday) ==
- The Free Democratic Party won a plurality of seats in federal elections in Switzerland.
- Born: Jimmy McIlroy, footballer, in Lambeg, Northern Ireland (d. 2018)

== October 26, 1931 (Monday) ==
- Eleven political leaders in Poland went on trial for conspiring to overthrow Józef Piłsudski.
- The Eugene O'Neill play Mourning Becomes Electra premiered at the Guild Theatre on Broadway.
- Died: Charles Comiskey, 72, American baseball player, manager and team owner who founded the Chicago White Sox in 1901; Comiskey Park was named in his honor in 1913

== October 27, 1931 (Tuesday) ==
- The United Kingdom general election was held. The informal coalition known as the National Government won a commanding 554 seats, with the Conservative Party winning 470 of them. The Labour Party was reduced to 46 seats. Prime Minister Ramsay MacDonald, running as a candidate for the new National Labour party, was re-elected to lead the coalition. Oswald Mosley's New Party had a disastrous showing, garnering 0.2% of the vote and failing to win a single seat. The Communist Party took no seats either gaining a slightly larger share of the vote than the New Party.

== October 28, 1931 (Wednesday) ==
- The Soviet Union cut the prices of commodities sold in commercial shops by 30% effective November 1, offsetting a 50% increase enacted over the summer.
- Lefty Grove of the Philadelphia Athletics was named the Most Valuable Player of baseball's American League by the Baseball Writers' Association of America.
- Died: John McEntee Bowman, 56, Canadian-born American businessman

== October 29, 1931 (Thursday) ==
- Symphony No. 1 "Afro-American" by William Grant Still was performed for the first time at the Eastman School of Music in Rochester, New York.
- Died: Luciano Gallet, 38, Brazilian composer, conductor and pianist

== October 30, 1931 (Friday) ==
- Adolf Hitler named Baldur von Schirach the Reichsjugendführer (Youth Leader) of the Hitler Youth.
- Died: Guido Holzknecht, 58, Austrian radiologist

== October 31, 1931 (Saturday) ==
- In Geneva, 15 nations agreed to participate in a one-year moratorium on building armaments effective November 1.
- The last Ford Model A rolled off the assembly line.
- The romantic comedy film Platinum Blonde starring Loretta Young, Robert Williams and Jean Harlow was released.
- Born: Dan Rather, American journalist and former CBS News anchor; in Wharton, Texas
- Died: Octave Uzanne, 80, French bibliophile and writer
