= November 1931 =

Month of 1931

<<	November 1931					>>
Su	Mo	Tu	We	Th	Fr	Sa
1	2	3	4	5	6	7
8	9	10	11	12	13	14
15	16	17	18	19	20	21
22	23	24	25	26	27	28
29	30

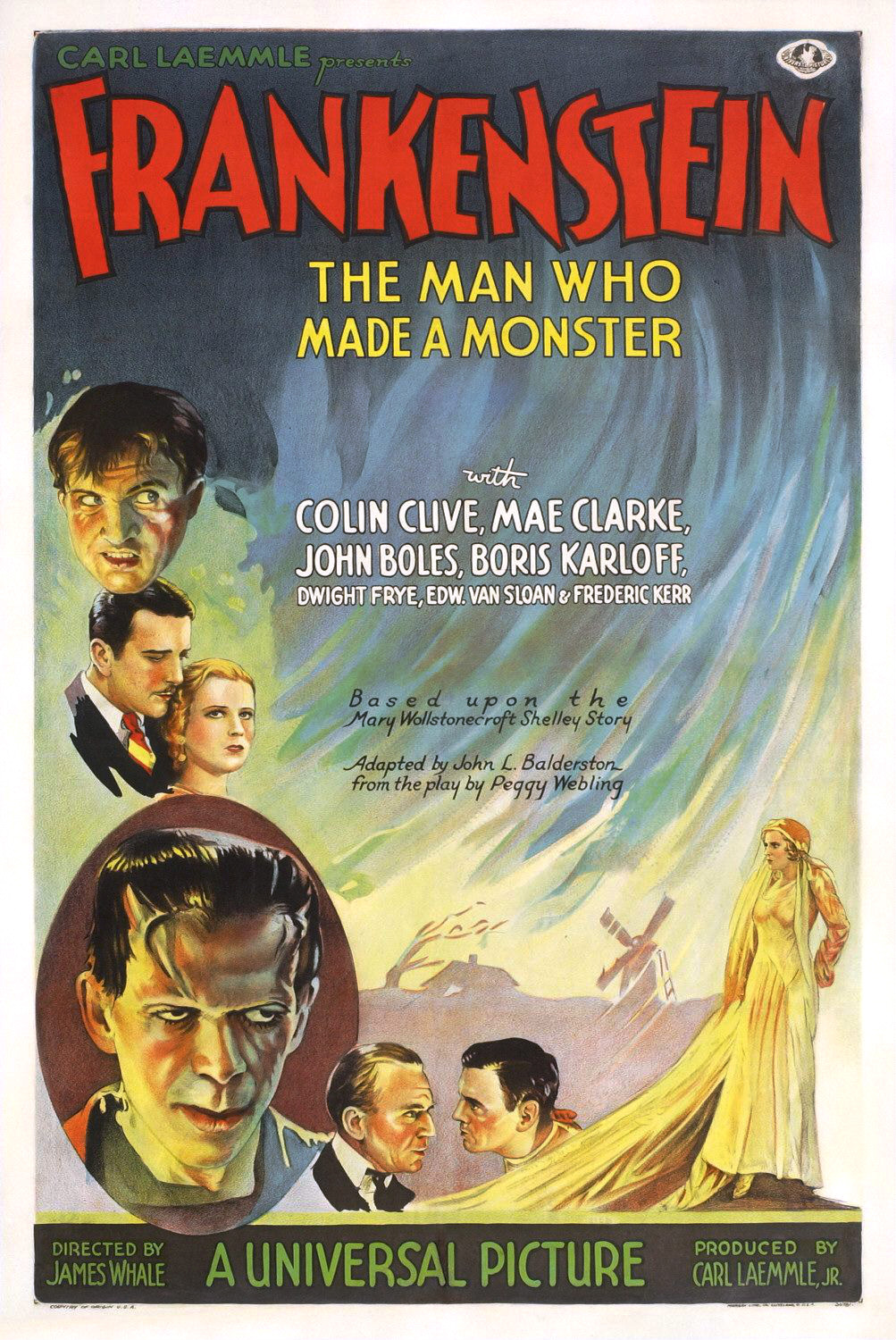
November 21, 1931: Universal Pictures releases Frankenstein and creates the signature image of Frankenstein's Monster

The following events occurred in November 1931:

== November 1, 1931 (Sunday) ==
- Thirty people were injured during rioting between fascists and anti-fascists at the French towns of Nice, Chambéry and Dijon when Italians came to the towns to pay their respects to Italian war dead.

== November 2, 1931 (Monday) ==
- The DuPont company announced the invention of a new synthetic rubber called DuPrene, known today as neoprene.
- Six more nations, including Great Britain and France, joined the one-year moratorium on building armaments. Since the agreement was an informal one, however, the League of Nations was uncertain whether the holiday had really gone into effect on November 1 or not.
- The United States Supreme Court decided United States v. Kirby Lumber Co., upholding taxation on money saved by settling debts for less than the full amount owed..

== November 3, 1931 (Tuesday) ==
- In Germany, Prussia's Interior Minister Carl Severing banned all parades and outdoor assemblies until further notice. Exceptions were made for gatherings of apolitical character such as weddings and funerals.
- Born:
  - Michael Fu Tieshan, Chinese Roman Catholic bishop and leader of the government-approved Chinese Patriotic Catholic Association; in Qingyuan, Hebei province (d. 2007)
  - Monica Vitti (stage name for Maria Luisa Ceciarelli), award-winning Italian film actress, in Rome (d. 2022)

== November 4, 1931 (Wednesday) ==
- The Jiangqiao Campaign was opened by the Imperial Japanese Army in its fight to take control of the Chinese region of Manchuria with the Resistance at Nenjiang Bridge, south of Qiqihar in the Heilongjiang province.
- David Lloyd George officially stepped down as Leader of the Liberal Party and was succeeded by Sir Herbert Samuel. "As you are aware", Lloyd George wrote to Samuel, "I am completely at variance with the disastrous course into which the party recently has been guided. It may therefore ease matters, and at any rate save embarrassment to my friends, if I write to tell you that I am not a candidate for election to any office in the group." Several MPs joined Lloyd George's break from the Liberals to sit in Parliament as a small voting bloc known as the Independent Liberals.
- The British drama film Michael and Mary was released in the United Kingdom.
- Born: Marie Mansfield, American baseball pitcher in the AAGPBL, 1953 strikeouts leader; in Jamaica Plain, Massachusetts (d. 2024)
- Died: Buddy Bolden, 54, African-American cornet player

== November 5, 1931 (Thursday) ==
- The Mahatma Gandhi attended a formal reception at Buckingham Palace and met with King George V for five minutes. Gandhi wore only his usual attire of loin cloth and shawl, which made for an extraordinary scene of contrast with the silken finery of other guests.
- Five sailors on the battleship USS Colorado were killed in the explosion of an anti-aircraft gun. 27 others were wounded.
- Neville Chamberlain became the new British Chancellor of the Exchequer.
- The blasphemy trial of German artist George Grosz finally ended after three years. The court ordered the confiscation and destruction of the Grosz illustration Maul Halten und Weiter Deinen (Shut Up and Soldier On), which depicted a crucified Christ wearing army boots and a gas mask.
- Born: Ike Turner, American musician; in Clarksdale, Mississippi (d. 2007)

== November 6, 1931 (Friday) ==
- The Italian government awarded prizes to the families with the most children.
- The Sergei Yutkevich-directed film Golden Mountains, with music by composer Dmitri Shostakovich, premiered in Leningrad.
- The Mahatma Gandhi met George Bernard Shaw and his wife in London.
- Born: Mike Nichols, German born-American director, producer, actor and comedian; as Igor Mikhail Peschkowsky, in Berlin (d. 2014)
- Died:
  - Thaddeus H. Caraway, 60, U.S. Senator for Arkansas since March 4 and previously U.S. Representative from 1913 to 1921, died of a heart attack caused by a blood clot in his coronary artery
  - Jack Chesbro, 57, American baseball pitcher and Baseball Hall of Fame inductee, from a heart attack

== November 7, 1931 (Saturday) ==
Chinese Soviet Republic flag

- Mao Zedong announced the formation of the Chinese Soviet Republic in Jiangxi Province.
- Ralph Capone, the older brother of Al Capone and a Chicago mobster, went to federal prison after being convicted of income tax fraud.

== November 8, 1931 (Sunday) ==
- Police stations and the Governor's headquarters were attacked in the city of Tianjin by hundreds of Chinese rioters, reportedly at the instigation of Japanese operatives.

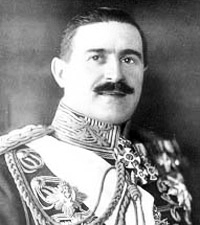
Zivkovic

- Parliamentary elections were held in Yugoslavia. Voters only had one choice, "yes" or "no" on a slate of candidates representing the government of Prime Minister Petar Živković.
- Born:
  - Morley Safer, Canadian-born American journalist and co-host of 60 Minutes, winner of 13 Emmy Awards; in Toronto (d. 2016)
  - Darla Hood, American child actress known for starring in the Our Gang comedies, later a popular singer; in Leedey, Oklahoma (d. 1979)

== November 9, 1931 (Monday) ==
- Mahatma Gandhi said that the Round Table Conference was a failure and that he would return to India to resume the campaign against British rule.
- The King Vidor-directed film The Champ, starring Wallace Beery and 9-year-old Jackie Cooper, had its world premiere at the Astor Theatre in New York City.
- Born: Whitey Herzog (Dorrel Norman Herzog), American baseball team manager and player, Hall of Fame inductee; in New Athens, Illinois (d. 2024)

== November 10, 1931 (Tuesday) ==
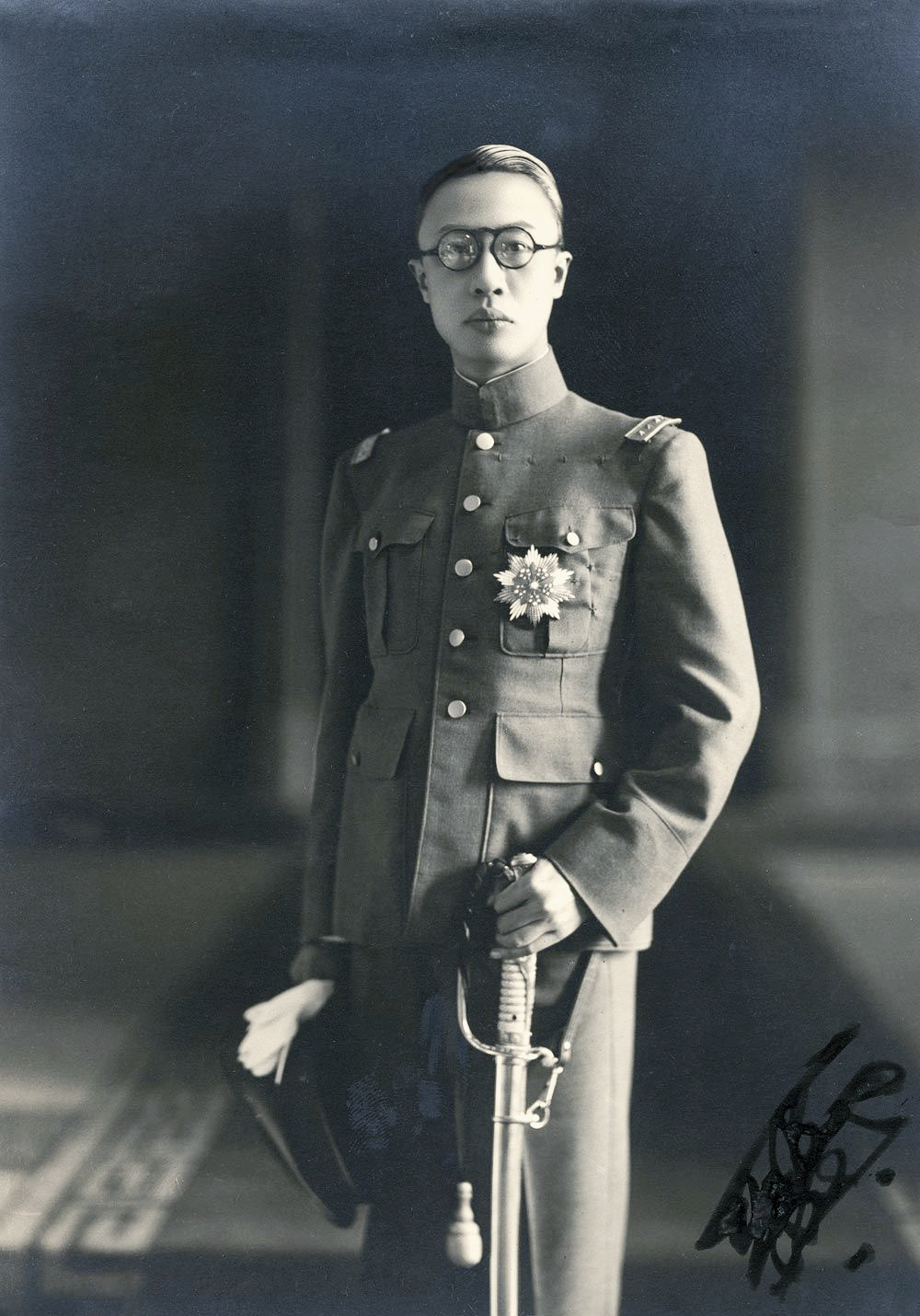
Pu Yi

- Puyi, the last Chinese emperor, left his exile in Tianjin and went over to Japanese authorities, who were offering to restore him to the throne in Manchuria.
- Cimarron won the award for Best Picture at the 4th Academy Awards.

== November 11, 1931 (Wednesday) ==
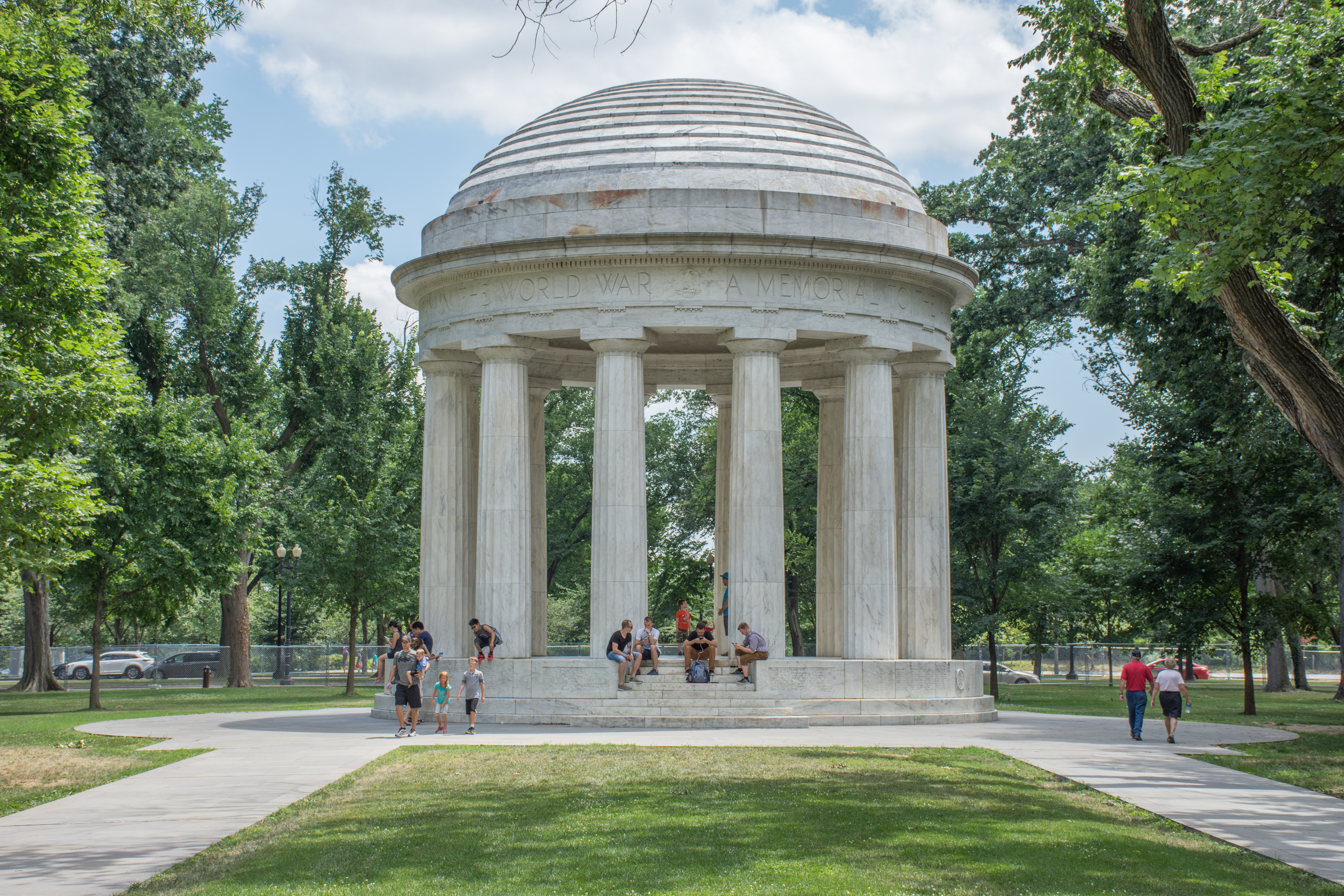
The Memorial

- The District of Columbia War Memorial was dedicated by U.S. President Herbert Hoover.
- Died: Shibusawa Eiichi, 91, Japanese industrialist

== November 12, 1931 (Thursday) ==
- A Spanish commission announced its findings that former king Alfonso XIII was guilty of lèse-majesté under the Constitution of 1876 which the commission argued placed the people as co-sovereign with the king. The commission recommended that Alfonso be condemned to disgrace, his property confiscated and that he be executed if he ever set foot in the country again.
- Maple Leaf Gardens opened in Toronto, Ontario, Canada. The Toronto Maple Leafs hockey team lost to the Chicago Black Hawks 2–1. Mush March scored the first goal in the arena's history.
- Born: Mary Louise Wilson, American stage actress and Tony Award winner; in New Haven, Connecticut

== November 13, 1931 (Friday) ==
- U.S. President Hoover announced that he would recommend to congress the creation of a federal system of home loan banks to assist the credit facilities of building and loan associations, banks, and other institutions making loans on home property.
- Died: General Ivan Fichev, 71, Chief of the General Staff of the Bulgarian Army and later Minister of War

== November 14, 1931 (Saturday) ==
- The Japanese army handed Chinese General Ma Zhanshan an ultimatum, demanding that he withdraw his troops from Qiqihar and Anganchi by November 25, or else Japan would "take effective measures."

== November 15, 1931 (Sunday) ==
- The Bayonne Bridge connecting Bayonne, New Jersey with Staten Island, New York opened. It was the longest steel arch bridge in the world at the time of its construction.
- The Nazi Party won state elections in Hesse with 37% of the vote.
- Born: Mwai Kibaki, the third President of Kenya (from 2002 to 2013); in Gatuyaini, British Kenya (d. 2022)

== November 16, 1931 (Monday) ==
- The British government introduced the Abnormal Importations Bill which gave the government power to impose a duty of up to 100% duty on imports.
- Italian Foreign Affairs Minister Dino Grandi arrived in Washington for talks with President Hoover. Anti-fascist protests were feared, but the crowd that stood at the train station to witness Grandi's arrival was friendly.
- The sale of the British airship R100, to a London scrap metal firm, was announced.
- Born: Hubert Sumlin, blues guitarist and singer, in Greenwood, Mississippi (d. 2011)

== November 17, 1931 (Tuesday) ==
- The Svirlag forced labour camp was established in the Soviet Union near Leningrad.

== November 18, 1931 (Wednesday) ==
- Japanese forces captured Qiqihar.
- In Berlin, Adolf Hitler had a four-hour meeting with Hermine Reuss of Greiz, second wife of exiled kaiser Wilhelm II. The Nazi Party sought to win favour in monarchist circles.

== November 19, 1931 (Thursday) ==
- American Secretary of State Henry L. Stimson informed Britain that the U.S. would not participate in League of Nations economic sanctions against Japan.
- The Arnold Bax composition Overture to a Picaresque Comedy was performed for the first time in Manchester.
- The Jean Renoir-directed film La Chienne was released.

== November 20, 1931 (Friday) ==
- An explosion at Bentley Colliery in Yorkshire killed 42 English coal miners.
- Former King of Spain Alfonso XIII was declared an outlaw and a criminal by the Spanish Assembly.
- The Abnormal Importations Act received royal assent after a rushed passage through Parliament.
- Rolls-Royce acquired Bentley Motors.
- The Dow Jones Industrial Average fell below 100 points for the first time since the beginning of the Great Depression. The Dow, which had peaked at 300 points in 1928, would close the year at 77.90 points and continue to fall.
- Died: Julius Drewe, 75, English businessman, retailer and entrepreneur

== November 21, 1931 (Saturday) ==
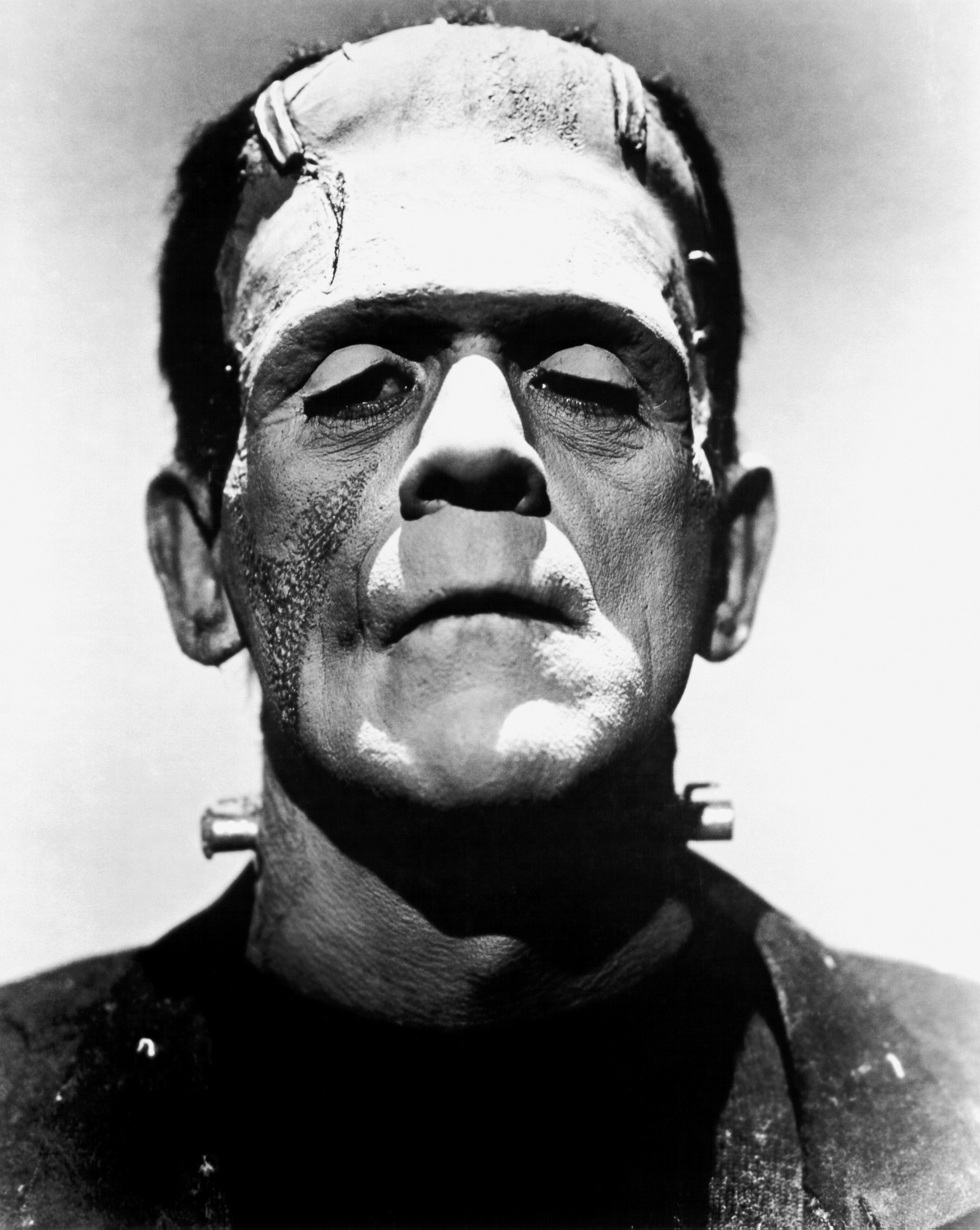
Boris Karloff in his monster makeup

- The horror film Frankenstein starring Colin Clive as Dr. Frankenstein and Boris Karloff as Frankenstein's monster, along with Mae Clark and John Boles was released.
- Japan told the League of Nations that it would allow an investigative committee into Manchuria, but that it could not interfere with Japanese military operations there.
- Born:
  - Revaz Dogonadze, Soviet scientist and founder of quantum electrochemistry; in Tbilisi, Georgian SSR, Soviet Union (d. 1985)
  - Jim Ringo, American NFL football player and coach, Pro Football Hall of Fame enshrinee; in Orange, New Jersey (d. 2007)
  - Malcolm Williamson, Australian composer who served as Master of the Queen's Music from 1975 until his death; in Sydney (d. 2003)

== November 22, 1931 (Sunday) ==
- The Grand Canyon Suite by Ferde Grofé was performed in public for the first time at the Studebaker Theatre in Chicago.
- Born: Al Tomko, Canadian professional wrestler and wrestling promoter, in Winnipeg, Manitoba (d. 2009)

== November 23, 1931 (Monday) ==
- In Germany, journalists Walter Kreiser and Carl von Ossietzky were each sentenced to 18 months in prison for "betraying military secrets". They had exposed details of Germany's construction of a secret air force in violation of the Treaty of Versailles.

== November 24, 1931 (Tuesday) ==
- The Belgian Rugby Federation was founded.
- Died: John Henry Clarke, 78, English classical homeopath

== November 25, 1931 (Wednesday) ==
- The so-called "Boxheim Documents" were revealed in Germany by Prussian Interior Minister Carl Severing, who said they had been passed on to police by a former Nazi. The papers, prepared by Werner Best over the summer, detailed the Nazi Party's contingency plans in the event of a communist coup in Germany. After crushing the communists, the documents read, the SA would take over the country and execute anyone who resisted without trial. A national labour service would also be enacted which would be mandatory in order to be guaranteed food stamps, but "non-Aryans" would be excluded and left to starve.
- Died: Alf Taylor, 83, Governor of Tennessee from 1921 to 1923 and former U.S. Congressman

== November 26, 1931 (Thursday) ==
- Hermann Göring made a statement about the Boxheim Documents, insisting that the Nazi leadership had no knowledge of them because they were written by the Hessian Nazis alone.
- Born: Adolfo Pérez Esquivel, human rights activist in Argentina and recipient of the 1980 Nobel Peace Prize; in Buenos Aires

== November 27, 1931 (Friday) ==
- American theater chain operator and promoter Alexander Pantages was acquitted of rape charges in his second trial. The negative publicity from the trial, however, ended his involvement in business and he would lose most of his wealth by the time of his death in 1936.
- Died: Robert Ames, 42, American stage and film actor, was found dead in his room at New York's Hotel Delmonico, from delirium tremens associated with withdrawal from alcohol

== November 28, 1931 (Saturday) ==
- A Hungarian army general committed suicide in police custody after being arrested with 31 others for plotting to overthrow the government.
- Born:
  - Dervla Murphy, Irish touring cyclist and travel book writer; in Lismore, County Waterford (d. 2022)
  - Tomi Ungerer, French illustrator and writer, in Strasbourg (d. 2019)
  - Gloria Winters, American TV actress, in Los Angeles (d. 2010)
- Died: Saya San, 55, Burmese monk and revolutionary leader who had led a rebellion against British colonial authorities, was hanged at the prison in Tharrawaddy

== November 29, 1931 (Sunday) ==
- The Internal Revenue Bureau issued its income statistics for 1930, showing that the United States had 19,688 millionaires – half the number from before the Wall Street Crash.
- A group of 30 people attacked the Japanese embassy in London by smashing windows and trying to force an entry, but they fled as police arrived.
- Died: Kenneth G. Matheson, 67, American professor and university chancellor

== November 30, 1931 (Monday) ==
- The Chinese government accepted a League of Nations proposal to establish a neutral zone in Manchuria between Chinese and Japanese forces.
- The British pound fell in value to a worth of $3.41 American dollars or 5 s. 10 d. to one dollar (five shillings and a ten pence per dollar), its lowest level since 1918.
