= January 1932 =

Month of 1932

<<	January 1932					>>
Su	Mo	Tu	We	Th	Fr	Sa
					1	2
3	4	5	6	7	8	9
10	11	12	13	14	15	16
17	18	19	20	21	22	23
24	25	26	27	28	29	30
31

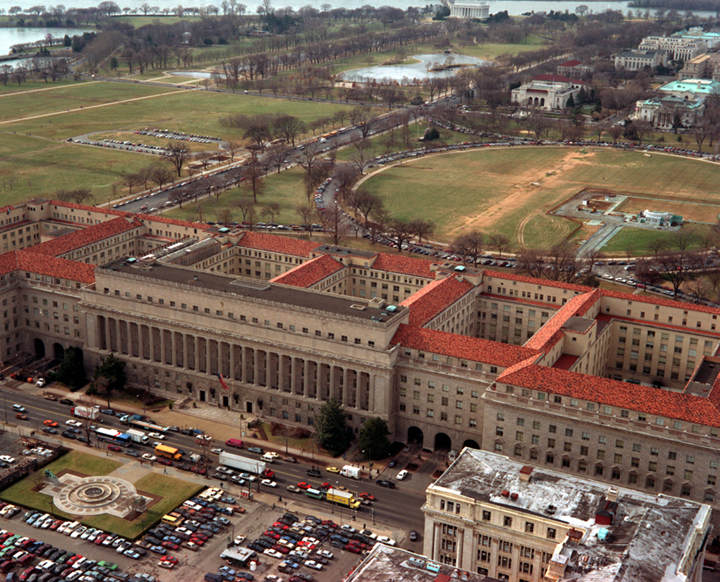
January 4, 1932: The world's largest government office building opens to house the U.S. Department of Commerce

The following events occurred in January 1932:

== January 1, 1932 (Friday) ==
- The #1 ranked USC Trojans (8–1–0) faced the unbeaten and untied (11–0–0), but #2 ranked in the Dikenson Ratings, Tulane Green Wave, defeating them 21 to 12 in the Rose Bowl to win the unofficial college football championship of 1931.
- The Mahatma Gandhi issued a statement notifying Indians to be ready to resume the civil disobedience campaign.
- Born: Tzaims Luksus, American artist and fashion designer; as James Henry Luskus, in Chicago
- Died: C. P. Scott, 85, British journalist, publisher and politician.

== January 2, 1932 (Saturday) ==
- The collision of two trains killed 68 people and injured 131 on the Kazan line near Moscow. The Soviet government initially suppressed news of the disaster.
- The shootout known as the Young Brothers massacre occurred outside Brookline, Missouri. The criminal family of Paul, Harry and Jennings Young gunned down six law enforcement officials who had gone to the family farm to arrest them for trying to sell a stolen car. From the police department of Springfield, Missouri, chief of detectives Tony Oliver, detective Albert Meadows and officer Charles Houser were killed, along with Greene County Sheriff Marcell C. Hendrix and two of his deputies, Wiley M. Mashburn and Oliver Crosswhite.
- Japanese forces in Manchuria captured Jinzhou.
- Born: Jean Little, Canadian children's author, as the daughter of Canadian missionaries; in Taiwan (d. 2020)

== January 3, 1932 (Sunday) ==
- A national manhunt commenced for the Young brothers.
- Born: Dabney Coleman, American film and TV actor; in Austin, Texas (d. 2024)

== January 4, 1932 (Monday) ==
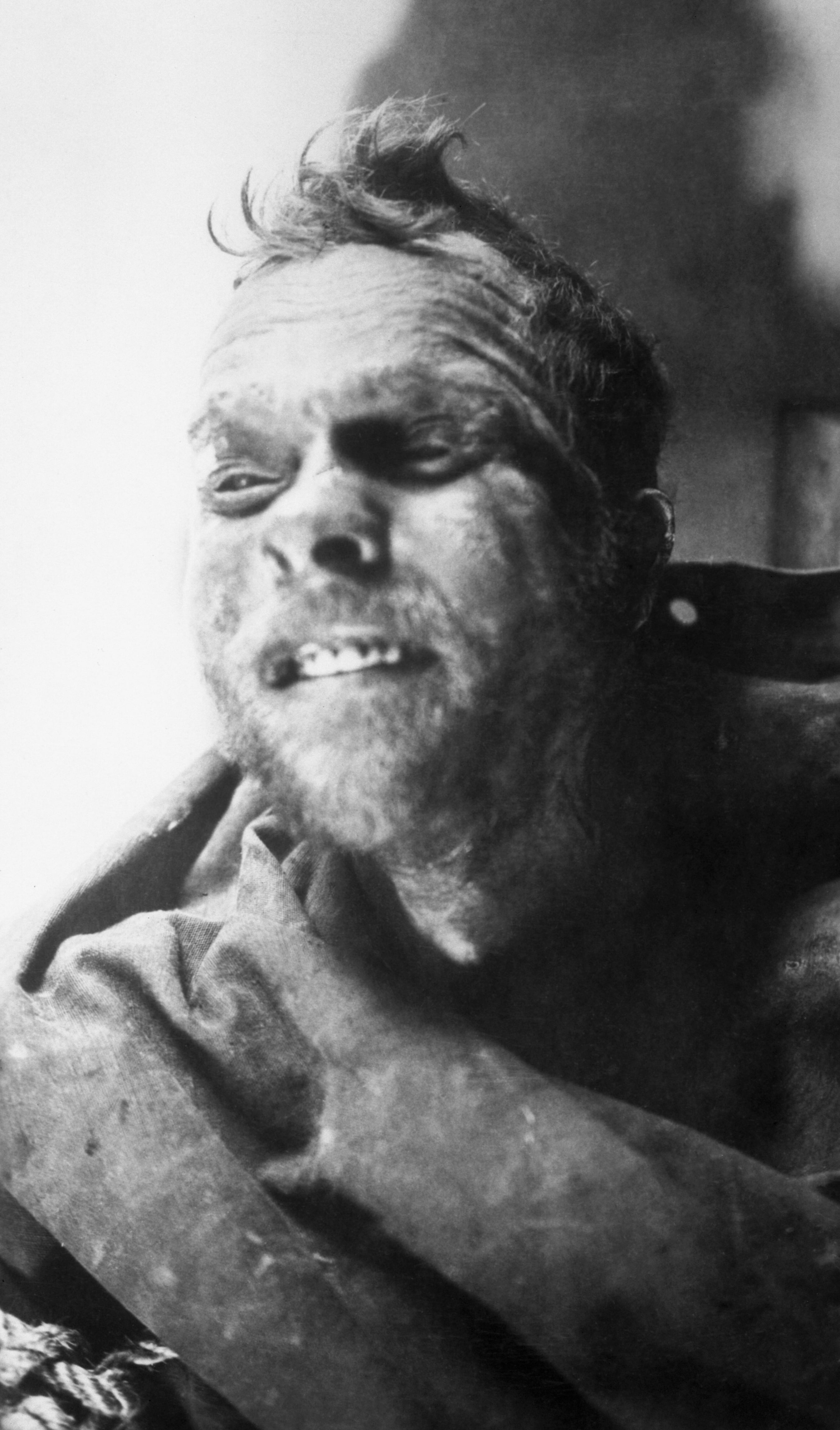
The Mad Trapper

- The Mahatma Gandhi was arrested and imprisoned in Yerwada Central Jail.
- Jawaharlal Nehru was sentenced to two years hard labour.
- The Department of Commerce Building opened in Washington, the largest office building in the world at the time. From the beginning it was informally known as "Hoover's building" (for the incumbent president who had been former U.S. Secretary of Commerce). The name would become official in 1981 with its renaming as the Herbert C. Hoover Building.
- In Aklavik in the Northwest Territories of Canada, the Royal Canadian Mounted Police formed a seven-man posse to go after Albert Johnson, who by now had been dubbed in the media as the "Mad Trapper of Rat River".
- Born: Clint Hill, American Secret Service agent; in Larimore, North Dakota (d. 2025)

== January 5, 1932 (Tuesday) ==
- The Young brothers fatally shot each other in an apparent suicide pact after being surrounded by law enforcement in Houston, Texas.
- Poland and Greece signed a friendship treaty.
- Born:
  - Umberto Eco, Italian scholar and author; in Alessandria (d. 2016)
  - Johnny Adams, American singer, in New Orleans (d. 1998)

== January 6, 1932 (Wednesday) ==
- Joseph Lyons became the new Prime Minister of Australia.
- Born: Stuart A. Rice, American theoretical chemist; in New York City(d. 2024).
- Died: Julius Rosenwald, 69, American businessman and philanthropist.

== January 7, 1932 (Thursday) ==
- The U.S. government enunciated the Stimson Doctrine, telling Japan that it would not recognize Manchuria as Japanese territory.
- German Chancellor Heinrich Brüning asked Adolf Hitler to support a one-year extension of the presidential term of Paul von Hindenburg. The term was set to expire in May but Brüning wanted to save the country from the turmoil of a presidential election.
- Died: André Maginot, 54, Minister of War for France known for his advocacy of the network of border fortresses called the Maginot Line, from typhoid fever

== January 8, 1932 (Friday) ==
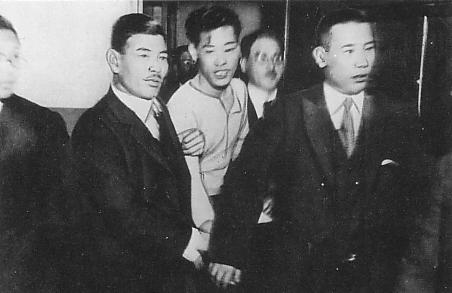
Attempted assassin Lee

- An assassination attempt against Japan's Emperor Hirohito was made by a man who threw a hand grenade at the imperial carriage as it was leaving the Sakuradamon Gate of the Imperial Palace in Tokyo. The assailant was identified as Korean independence activist Lee Bong-chang. Lee was hanged in Ichigaya Prison on October 10.
- Ailing French Foreign Minister Aristide Briand announced he was stepping down and retiring from politics.
- Navy Lieutenant Thomas H. Massie and socialite Grace Fortescue were arrested and charged with first degree murder in the death of Joe Kahahawai, a boxer who had been tried in the rape of Massie's wife in a case that ended in a hung jury. The murder led to the criminal case known as the Massie Trial.
- Died: Eurosia Fabris, 65, Italian Roman Catholic mother and benefactor of the poor; she would be beatified in 2005 and be considered as of 2021 for canonization.

== January 9, 1932 (Saturday) ==
- German Chancellor Heinrich Brüning announced that Germany would refuse to pay any more reparations, saying the present economic situation made it "impossible".
- The comedy film This Reckless Age starring Charles "Buddy" Rogers was released.
- The RCMP arrived at Albert Johnson's cabin and surrounded it, ordering him to give himself up. Johnson never spoke a word but opened fire from holes in the cabin walls when officers approached, and a standoff began.

== January 10, 1932 (Sunday) ==
- British Prime Minister Ramsay MacDonald tried to prevent the cancellation or postponement of the Lausanne Conference on German reparations scheduled to open on January 25, saying it was "even more necessary than ever".
- In Karachi, at the time part of British India, 28 people were injured when police charged into a crowd of independence demonstrators.
- More Hawaiians turned out for the funeral of murdered boxer Joseph Kahahawai than for any funeral since Liliuokalani, last queen of Hawaii, in 1917.
- The RCMP dynamited Albert Johnson's cabin. Unsure if Johnson was still alive, a flashlight tied to a stick was shone in the doorway. When gunfire shot out the flashlight, the police officers recognized that they were short on supplies and decided to return to Aklavik.

== January 11, 1932 (Monday) ==
- Adolf Hitler and Alfred Hugenberg informed Chancellor Brüning that they would not agree to the proposed one-year extension of Hindenburg's presidential term.
- The Indian government issued an emergency decree forbidding all meetings of groups consisting of more than five people.
- Born: Takkō Ishimori, Japanese voice actor in Nagasaki Prefecture (d. 2013)

== January 12, 1932 (Tuesday) ==
- The cabinet of Pierre Laval resigned In France, throwing the Lausanne Conference into even more uncertainty.
- Bulgaria joined Germany in declaring that it, too, was unable to pay any more reparations.
- Born: Des O'Connor, British television presenter and singer in Stepney, London (d. 2020)

== January 13, 1932 (Wednesday) ==
- The Sukkur Barrage opened in India.
- Born: Joseph Zen, Roman Catholic Cardinal and Archbishop of Hong Kong in Shanghai.
- Died:
  - Queen Consort of the Hellenes Sophia of Prussia, 61, German-born daughter of the Emperor Frederick III, later the wife of King Constantine I of Greece. She was the mother of three Greek kings: Alexander (1917–1920), George II (1922–1924, 1935–1947), and Paul (1947–1964) and was barred from Greece after the abolition of the monarchy in 1924.
  - Ernest Mangnall, 66, English soccer football manager who guided Manchester United to Football League championships in 1908 and 1911

== January 14, 1932 (Thursday) ==
- Piano Concerto in G Major by Maurice Ravel was performed for the first time in the Salle Pleyel in Paris.

== January 15, 1932 (Friday) ==
- Cinco Danzas Gitanas op.55 for piano by Spanish composer Joaquín Turina was first performed in Madrid.
- Born: Cleven "Goodie" Goudeau, American art director and cartoonist; in Hillister, Texas (d. 2015)

== January 16, 1932 (Saturday) ==
- Reichstag member Hermann Göring presented an ultimatum on behalf of Hitler and the entire Nazi Party to Chancellor Brüning, saying that they would withdraw their opposition to the extension of Hindenburg's presidential term if Brüning resigned.
- Hitler was acquitted in a Berlin court of a charge of libel brought against him by Walter Stennes, but Der Angriff editor Julius Lippert was ordered to pay a fine of 300 marks for accusing Stennes of being a police spy.
- The ruins of Albert Johnson's cabin were found deserted. An Arctic manhunt for the "Mad Trapper" was now on.
- Born: Dian Fossey, American zoologist; in San Francisco (murdered 1985)

== January 17, 1932 (Sunday) ==
- The Soviet government finally released information about the January 2 train disaster after wild rumours exaggerating the death toll became too widespread to ignore. Eleven rail workers stood accused of criminal negligence.
- The Bertolt Brecht play The Mother, based on the Maxim Gorky 1906 novel of the same name, premiered at the Komödienhaus am Schiffbauerdamm in Berlin.
- Born: Sheree North (stage name for Dawn Shirley Crang), American actress, dancer and singer; in Los Angeles (d. 2005)

== January 18, 1932 (Monday) ==
- Two people were killed and 7 injured in fighting between Nazis and Communists in the Berlin borough of Reinickendorf. Police made 50 arrests.
- Born: Robert Anton Wilson, American writer; in Brooklyn (d. 2007).

== January 19, 1932 (Tuesday) ==
- Ireland was hit with its worst flooding in thirty years.
- Jury selection began in the Winnie Ruth Judd murder trial in Phoenix, Arizona.

== January 20, 1932 (Wednesday) ==
- The Lausanne Conference was postponed.
- Imperial Airways began regular service between London and Cape Town, South Africa, with a timetable allowing ten and a half days for the 8,000 mile flight.

== January 21, 1932 (Thursday) ==
- The National Diet of Japan was dissolved and new elections were called.
- Finland and the Soviet Union signed a non-aggression pact.

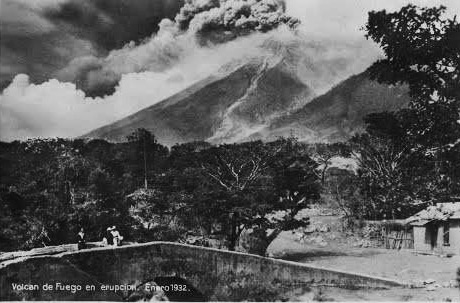
The 1932 eruption

- The Volcán de Fuego erupted in Guatemala, killing 34 people.
- Born: Kazuo Inamori, Japanese businessman and engineer who founded Kyoto Ceramic Company, now the Kyocera electronics and ceramic manufacturer; in Kagoshima (d. 2022)
- Died: Lytton Strachey, 51, British writer and critic, from stomach cancer.

== January 22, 1932 (Friday) ==
- An uprising of peasants in El Salvador began and would last for six months until July 11. During that period and the aftermath, at least 10,000 people, and perhaps as many as 40,000 would be killed by government troops.
- The Reconstruction Finance Corporation (RFC) was created in the United States.
- The Brooklyn major league baseball team, which had never used an official nickname but had been referred to in recent seasons as the Robins, decided to become officially known as the Dodgers.
- Born: Piper Laurie (stage name for Rosetta Jacobs), American stage, film and TV actress; in Detroit (d. 2023)

== January 23, 1932 (Saturday) ==
- Franklin D. Roosevelt announced his candidacy for President of the United States by allowing a letter to be publicized in which he consented to have his name entered in the North Dakota primary.
- Born: Jack Gilbert Graham, American mass murderer who killed 44 people by planting a time bomb in his mother's suitcase on United Air Lines Flight 629; in Denver (executed 1957)

== January 24, 1932 (Sunday) ==
- Rioting broke out at HM Prison Dartmoor in England, as almost 100 convicts gained control of the institution, setting the administrative block on fire and destroying prison records. Prisoners also tried to scale the walls, although no one escaped. Police were called in and the riot was put down within two hours. About 20 people were hospitalized with injuries.
- Spain dissolved the country's Jesuit order and commanded all Jesuits to leave the country within ten days.
- Died: Sir Alfred Yarrow, 90, British shipbuilder

== January 25, 1932 (Monday) ==
- The Soviet Union and Poland signed a non-aggression pact.
- A gas explosion at a mine in Llwynypia, Wales killed four miners, with the afterdamp killing another five miners and two would-be rescuers.
- The Defense of Harbin began in Manchuria.
- Dartmoor Prison was surrounded by troops and the nearby roads were barricaded, amid fears of a new outbreak of rioting.
- Born: Nikolay Anikin, Soviet Russian skier, in Ishim, Tyumen Oblast, USSR (d. 2009)
- Died: James Paterson, 77, Scottish painter

== January 26, 1932 (Tuesday) ==
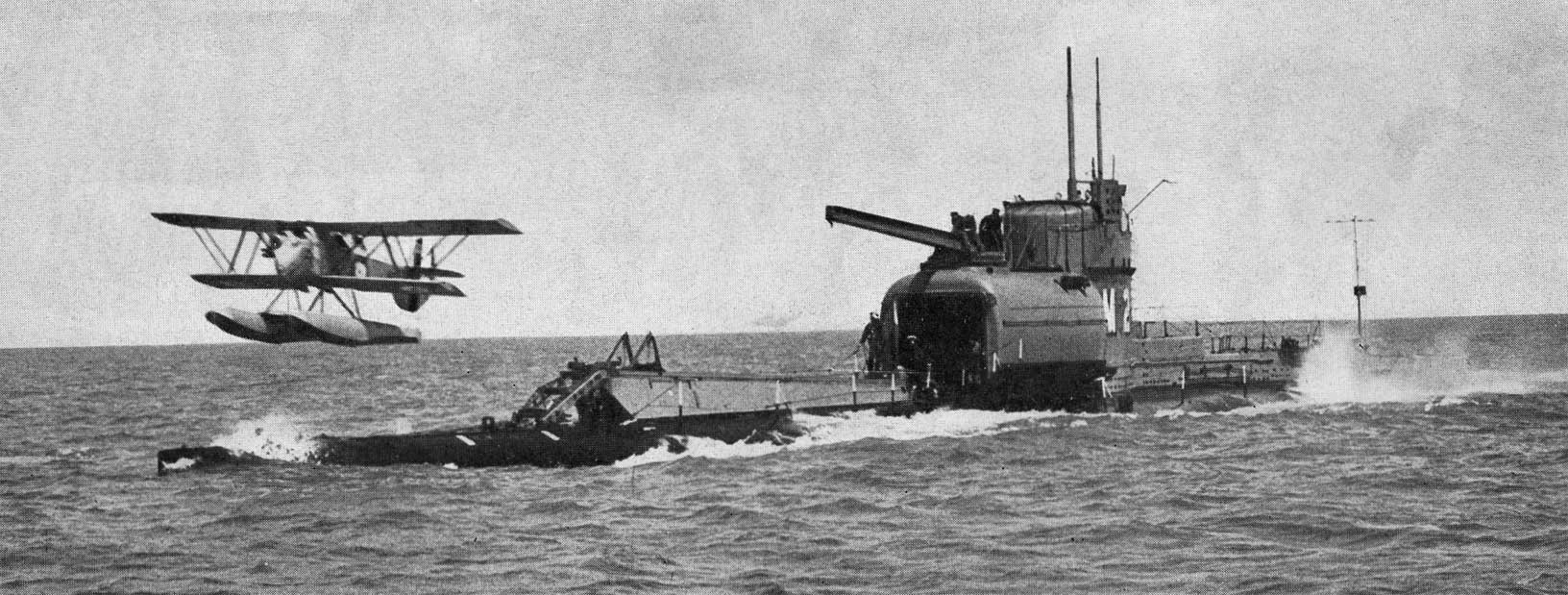
An airplane flying from M2

- The British submarine aircraft carrier HMS M2, which had the capability of carrying a seaplane underwater and then readying it for launch upon surfacing, sank near the Isle of Portland with the loss of all 60 of her crew. Investigators found that water had flowed in through the open hangar door before the Peto seaplane could be brought out for a launch.
- Adolf Hitler gave a famous speech to the Düsseldorf Industry Club assuring the country's business leaders that they had nothing to fear from a Nazi regime, as he stressed his belief in the importance of private property and the rewarding of enterprise.
- Seven of the eleven rail workers in the January 2 Soviet train disaster were found guilty of negligence and given varying prison terms of up to ten years.
- Born: Coxsone Dodd (Clement Seymour Dodd), Jamaican record producer who popularized ska and reggae music; in Kingston (d. 2004)
- Died:
  - William Wrigley Jr., 70, American chewing gum industrialist and owner of the Chicago Cubs baseball team
  - Eddie Stinson, 38, American pilot and aircraft manufacturer, was killed when he was demonstrating his Stinson Model R airplane; the aircraft ran out of fuel over Lake Michigan and Stinson's attempt at an emergency landing ended in a disaster when the airplane struck a flagpole.

== January 27, 1932 (Wednesday) ==
- The Prince of Wales was giving a speech on the economy in the Royal Albert Hall when a group of women interrupted with shouts of "Withdraw the forces from India!"

== January 28, 1932 (Thursday) ==
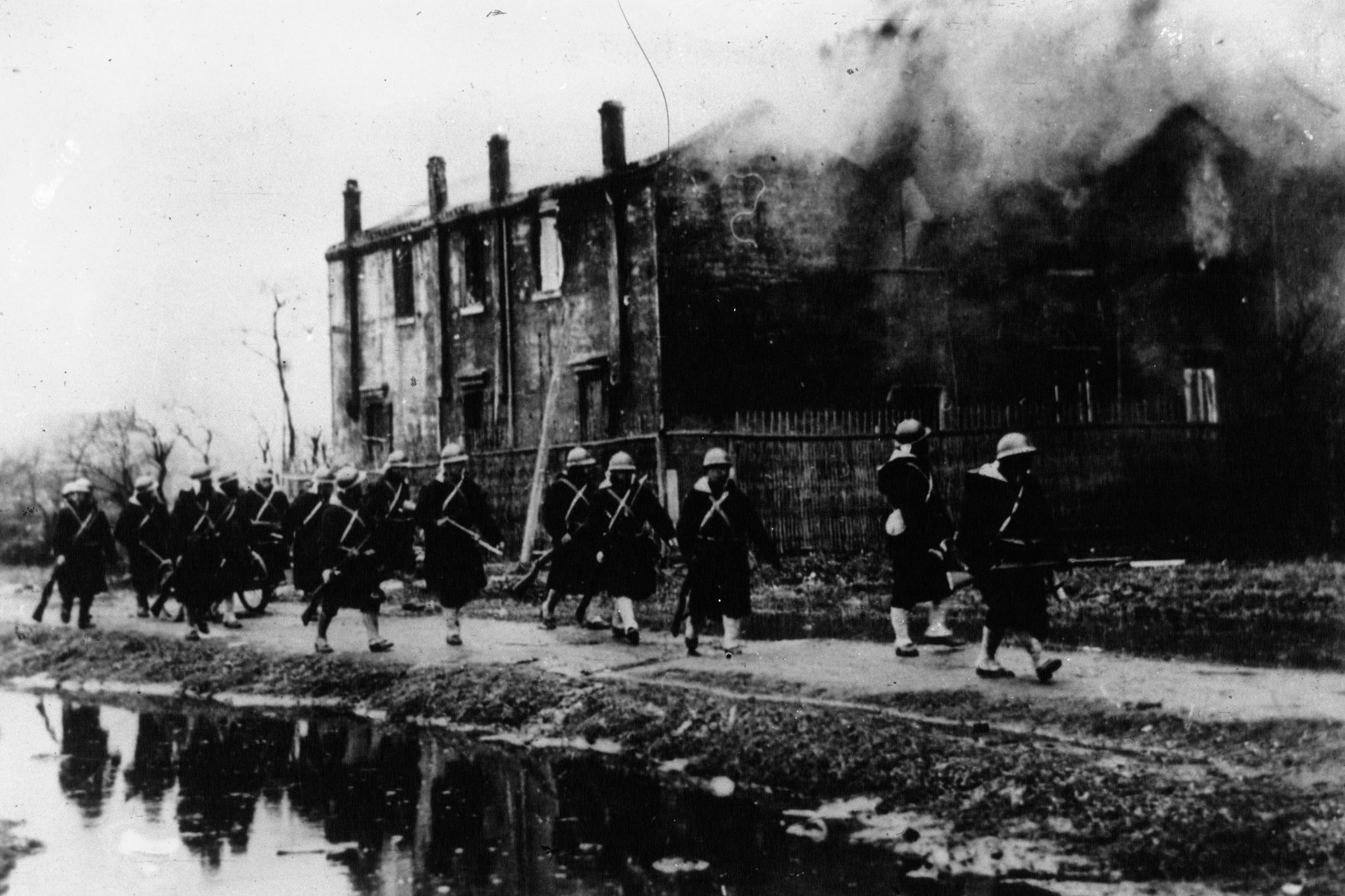
Burning Chinese military arsenal in Shanghai

- Japanese airplanes dropped bombs and set fires in Shanghai on the pretext of stopping violent anti-Japanese demonstrations and boycotts in the Chinese city.
- Born: Don McMichael, Australian marine biologist and government minister; in Rockhampton, Queensland (d. 2017)

== January 29, 1932 (Friday) ==
- The Second Rhapsody by George Gershwin was performed in public for the first time, at the Symphony Hall in Boston.
- The Sitar family murders occur in Elma, Manitoba, Canada. Seven members of the Sitar family are killed on their rural property by a 28-year-old farmhand.
- Born: Tommy Taylor, footballer, in Smithies, West Riding of Yorkshire, England (d. 1958)

== January 30, 1932 (Saturday) ==
- Chiang Kai-shek sent a telegram to China's military commanders instructing them to prepare to defend China and "to fight for her national existence."
- The four defendants in the Massie murder case were released on bail.
- Prohibition ended in Finland.
- The posse hunting Albert Johnson caught up to him and engaged in a shootout. Johnson killed an officer and escaped again.
- Born:
  - Mohammed Seddik Benyahia, Algerian politician; in Jijel, Algeria (d. 1982 in aircraft shootdown)
  - Knock Yokoyama (stage name for Isamu Yamada), Japanese comedian and later the Governor of the Osaka prefecture; in Kobe (d. 2007)
- Died: William Hodge, 57, American stage actor

== January 31, 1932 (Sunday) ==
- The United States and Great Britain ordered warships to Shanghai to protect citizens of their respective countries living there.
- Died: Enrico Butti, 84, Italian sculptor
