= Women's Industrial Service League =

The Women's Industrial Service League, Inc. was organized on October 8, 1931, with 14 members, under the leadership of Eleanor Hull. Many women had come from the South of the United States seeking a better life through jobs and education. Many of these women became domestic employees. The organization was set up so that young women in the Far Rockaway area of Queens would have a place to get counseling, sleeping accommodations, friendship and love. Hull was the president of the organization from 1931 to 1940. Originally known as the Working Girls Cooperative League the organization was incorporated in 1934.

The Women's Industrial Service League, Inc. purchased an indoor facility in 1936 to provide housing accommodations for detached women. The dwelling has a playground for children and an indoor Assembly area. The building is located at 1428 Beach Channel Drive in Far Rockaway.

Emily Brown was the second president of the Women's Industrial Service League and was instrumental in two major developments in Far Rockaway history. The high incidents of Tuberculosis in the Black community led to the creation of a chest x-ray program which was the spark that led to the creation of the Council for Health and Welfare. The Council for Health and Welfare began the fight for adequate housing believing that the risk of catching Tuberculosis was increased by the bad living conditions of the poor. The battle for better housing was culminated in the building of the Redfern Housing Projects.

The Women's Industrial Service League, Inc. has provided young people with a place to understand and evaluate all of the options that life provides for them. The league has been successful in providing scholarships and friendships that enhance and encourage young men and women. The annual Scholarship and Awards Luncheon began in 2005. The organization has also provided members with the chance to interact with guest speakers from different occupational backgrounds, sponsored seminars on entrepreneurship, resume writing, and participated in Black College Fairs.

A Youth Club was re-established within the organization in 1992. This was created by Women Industrial Service League, Inc. members Frances Shackelford-Howell and Yolanda Walker to help young people starting from the age of adolescence.

== Women’s Industrial Service League, Inc. Presidents ==
- Eleanor Beatrice Hull (1931–1940)
- Emily Capers Brown (1940–1962)
- Sadie Johnson (1962–?)
- Ada Green (?–1978)
- Rev. Annie Simmons (1978–1985)
- Josie Dennis (1985–1997)
- Yolanda Walker (1997–2000)
- Florine Jenkins (2000–Present)
