= Sippenbuch =

SS genealogical record mandated by Himmler to document ancestry

The Sippenbuch was a genealogical book carried by every member of the Schutzstaffel (SS). This measure was imposed by SS leader Heinrich Himmler to ensure the racial purity of the SS, who he described as a "racial upper strata of a Germanic people". Under the Sippenbuch regulations, each member of the SS had to be able to trace their lineage back to 1750 to prove they were of acceptable Aryan descent. Prospective marriage partners were required to provide the same evidence about their ancestry.
