= September 1932 =

Month of 1932

<<	September 1932					>>
Su	Mo	Tu	We	Th	Fr	Sa
				1	2	3
4	5	6	7	8	9	10
11	12	13	14	15	16	17
18	19	20	21	22	23	24
25	26	27	28	29	30

The following events occurred in September 1932:

== September 1, 1932 (Thursday) ==
- Jimmy Walker resigned as mayor of New York City. Joseph V. McKee became acting mayor.
- Leticia Incident: Peru and Colombia threatened to go to war over the Leticia region when armed Peruvians seized the city.
- Adolf Hitler gave a speech at a Nazi rally in the Berlin Sportpalast challenging Franz von Papen to dissolve the Reichstag.
- Born: Sunny von Bülow, heiress and socialite, in Manassas, Virginia (d. 2008); Derog Gioura, President of Nauru, in Nauru (d. 2008)
- Died: Guy Oliver, 53, American film actor (cancer)

== September 2, 1932 (Friday) ==
- The five Nazis condemned to death for murdering a communist had their sentences reduced to life imprisonment.
- Joe Medwick made his major league baseball debut for the St. Louis Cardinals, going 0-for-4 against the Chicago Cubs.

== September 3, 1932 (Saturday) ==
- Miners in Belgium ended their four-week strike and accepted a 10% increase in wages.
- Born: Eileen Brennan, actress, in Los Angeles (d. 2013)
- Died: Zhang Zongchang, 51, Chinese warlord (assassinated)

== September 4, 1932 (Sunday) ==
- A three-day international peace conference opened in Vienna.
- Abelardo L. Rodríguez became President of Mexico.
- 197,000 Der Stahlhelm marched in Tempelhof Field in Berlin and swore their allegiance to the von Papen government.
- Born: Dinsdale Landen, actor, in Margate, Kent, England (d. 2003)

== September 5, 1932 (Monday) ==
- A conference opened in Stresa, Italy to consider economic and territorial issues in eastern and central Europe.
- Born: Carol Lawrence, actress, in Melrose Park, Illinois
- Died: Paul Bern, 42, German-born American filmmaker (gunshot wound, ruled suicide)

== September 6, 1932 (Tuesday) ==
- The Velebit uprising began in Gospić, Croatia.
- Spain abolished the death penalty.
- Born: Marguerite Pearson, baseball player, in Pittsburgh, Pennsylvania (d. 2005)
- Died: Sir Gilbert Parker, 69, Canadian-born novelist and British politician

== September 7, 1932 (Wednesday) ==
- France rejected Germany's request for arms equality.
- Born: John Paul Getty Jr., British philanthropist, in the Kingdom of Italy (d. 2003)

== September 8, 1932 (Thursday) ==
- The Spanish Cortes declared all the estates of the grandees confiscated without indemnity, with intent to redistribute their property among the people.
- The Swiss-German war film Tannenberg was released.
- Born: Patsy Cline, singer, in Winchester, Virginia (d. 1963)

== September 9, 1932 (Friday) ==
- The Chaco War began.
- The passenger ferry Observation exploded and sank in the East River off Rikers Island, New York with the loss of 37 lives.
- The drama film Rain, starring Joan Crawford, premiered at Grauman's Chinese Theatre in Hollywood.
- Born: Carm Lino Spiteri, architect and politician, in Valletta, Malta (d. 2008)

== September 10, 1932 (Saturday) ==
- Disgraced Anglican priest Harold Davidson was fined in Blackpool court for causing an obstruction of traffic because of the large crowds he was attracting as he sat in a barrel along the waterfront charging money for a peep at him through a hole bored in the side.

== September 11, 1932 (Sunday) ==
- A train from Changchun to Harbin was derailed and looted by bandits, causing several deaths and many injuries.
- 16 died in a train accident in Athens.
- Born: Peter Anderson, footballer, in Devonport, England (d. 2009)

== September 12, 1932 (Monday) ==
- The Reichstag passed a motion of no confidence against the Franz von Papen cabinet by an overwhelming vote of 513 to 32, though von Papen called the vote illegal because he was entitled to the floor and had already placed the decree on the speaker's desk dissolving parliament.

== September 13, 1932 (Tuesday) ==
- President Paul von Hindenburg rebuked Reichstag president Hermann Göring, ordering him "to acknowledge the command for dissolution expressed yesterday and to recognize the legal status it created." Göring responded that he could not interrupt the vote on the nonconfidence motion once it began.
- Bartolomé Blanche became President of Chile after Carlos Dávila resigned. The Socialist Republic of Chile ended.
- The New York Yankees defeated the Cleveland Indians 9-3 to clinch the American League pennant.
- Born: Fernando González Pacheco, television presenter and journalist, in Valencia, Spain (d. 2014)
- Died: Julius Röntgen, 77, German-Dutch composer

== September 14, 1932 (Wednesday) ==
- A French military train plunged into a ravine in Algeria, killing 55 and wounding over 300.
- Died: Paul Gorguloff, 37, assassin of French President Paul Doumer (executed by guillotine)

== September 15, 1932 (Thursday) ==
- Chancellor von Papen decreed a 40-hour work week in an effort to create more jobs.
- Czechoslovakia denied Leon Trotsky a passport to enter the country to visit its curative baths.
- Died: William Craven, 5th Earl of Craven, 35, British peer (peritonitis)

== September 16, 1932 (Friday) ==
- British pilot Cyril Uwins broke the world airplane altitude record by reaching a height of almost 45,000 feet (14,000 m).
- Died:
  - Sir Ronald Ross KCB KCMG FRS FRCS, 75, Indian-born British medical doctor and Nobel Prize laureate
  - Millicent Lilian "Peg" Entwistle, 24, a Welsh-born English stage and screen actress, died by suicide. Entwistle began her stage career in 1925, appearing in several Broadway productions. She gained notoriety after she jumped to her death from the "H" on the Hollywoodland sign.

== September 17, 1932 (Saturday) ==
- The Colombian senate approved the appropriation of 10 million pesos to fight a war with Peru over the Leticia region.
- The Han–Liu War between the forces of the Chinese warlords Han Fuju and Liu Zhennian begins in Shandong.

== September 18, 1932 (Sunday) ==
- Two days of voting in the Swedish general election concluded. The Swedish Social Democratic Party remained the largest party.
- The body of actress Peg Entwistle was discovered near the famous Hollywoodland Sign from which she had evidently jumped to her death. A note found in her pocket read, "I am afraid I am a coward. I am sorry for everything. If I had done this long ago it would have saved a lot of pain."
- Born: Nikolay Rukavishnikov, cosmonaut, in Tomsk, USSR (d. 2002)

== September 19, 1932 (Monday) ==
- Bolivia and Paraguay both informed American neutrals that they were willing to accept a ceasefire.
- Born: Mike Royko, newspaper columnist, in Chicago, Illinois (d. 1997); Stefanie Zweig, writer and journalist, in Leobschütz, Germany (d. 2014)

== September 20, 1932 (Tuesday) ==
- Mahatma Gandhi began a "fast unto death" in Yerwada Central Jail as a protest against British Prime Minister Ramsay MacDonald's Communal Award. The authorities opened the door of Gandhi's cell and allowed him to leave, but Gandhi vowed to stay unless forcibly removed.
- In the St. Clair River, Garfield Wood reclaimed the world boat speed record with a new mark of 124.86 mph in the Miss America X.
- The Chicago Cubs clinched the National League pennant with a 5–2 win over the Pittsburgh Pirates.
- Died: Wovoka, 76?, American religious leader and founder of the Ghost Dance movement

== September 21, 1932 (Wednesday) ==
- The government of Gyula Károlyi resigned in Hungary.
- Born: Mohammed Fazle Rabbee, cardiologist and medical researcher, in Pabna District, Bangladesh (d. 1971)

== September 22, 1932 (Thursday) ==
- Manchukuo announced that if other countries did not recognize its sovereignty within six months, it would refuse to recognize the rights and interests of those countries in return.
- Born: Algirdas Brazauskas, President of Lithuania, in Rokiškis (d. 2010)

== September 23, 1932 (Friday) ==
- The Kingdom of Hejaz and Nejd was renamed Saudi Arabia.
- Died: Jules Chéret, 96, French painter and lithographer

== September 24, 1932 (Saturday) ==
- Mahatma Gandhi and Dr BR Ambedkar signed the Poona Pact.
- Per Albin Hansson became Prime Minister of Sweden.
- Born: Miguel Montuori, footballer, in Rosario, Argentina (d. 1998)

== September 25, 1932 (Sunday) ==
- Parliamentary elections were held in Greece. The Liberals remained the largest party in both houses even though the People's Party won a slight plurality of votes for the Vouli.
- The first contingent of National Hunger Marchers left Glasgow for London. and the marchers were greeted by a crowd of about 100,000 upon their arrival at Hyde Park on 27 October 1932.
- Born: Glenn Gould, pianist, in Toronto, Canada (d. 1982); Charles Stanley, televangelist, in Dry Fork, Virginia (d. 2023); Adolfo Suárez, Prime Minister of Spain, in Cebreros (d. 2014)
- Died: Joel R. P. Pringle, 59, American admiral

== September 26, 1932 (Monday) ==
- The Ierissos earthquake struck Greece, killing 491 people.
- Gandhi ended his fast when the government in London accepted a compromise agreement allotting the Untouchables a certain number of legislative seats.
- Born: Richard Herd, actor, in Boston, Massachusetts (d. 2020); Joyce Jameson, actress, in Chicago, Illinois (d. 1987); Manmohan Singh, economist and 14th Prime Minister of India, in Gah, Punjab, British India (d. 2024)

== September 27, 1932 (Tuesday) ==
- The San Ciprian hurricane killed over 200 people in Puerto Rico.
- Four Cuban political leaders were killed in a wave of assassinations. The most prominent death was President of the Senate Clemente Vazquez Bello, who was assassinated in a drive-by shooting as his car was leaving a country club.
- Italian ocean liner SS Rex makes her maiden voyage. She became the first Italian liner to win the Blue Riband.
- Born: Oliver E. Williamson, economist, in Superior, Wisconsin (d. 2020)
- Died: John Sharp Williams, 78, American politician

== September 28, 1932 (Wednesday) ==
- Four members of Ramsay MacDonald's cabinet resigned in protest over the government's tariff policy.
- The court of Helsinki sentences Vilho Kallio, Ville Saari and Ida Maria Viden to prison for the Tattarisuo mutilation case.
- Born: Víctor Jara, singer-songwriter and political activist, in Chillán Viejo, Chile (d. 1973)

== September 29, 1932 (Thursday) ==
- The Battle of Boquerón ended in victory for Paraguay when the Bolivian garrison surrendered.
- Pope Pius XI promulgated the encyclical Acerba animi, denouncing the continued persecution of Catholics in Mexico.
- Born: Mehmood Ali, actor, singer, director and producer, in Bombay, British India (d. 2004)

== September 30, 1932 (Friday) ==
- University students rioted in Havana on the second anniversary of the death of martyred student leader Rafael Trejo, who was killed by police in anti-government student demonstrations.
- Born: Shintaro Ishihara, politician and author, in Suma-ku, Kobe, Japan (d. 2022); Johnny Podres, baseball player, in Witherbee, New York (d. 2008)
