= July 1932 =

Month of 1932

<<	July 1932					>>
Su	Mo	Tu	We	Th	Fr	Sa
					1	2
3	4	5	6	7	8	9
10	11	12	13	14	15	16
17	18	19	20	21	22	23
24	25	26	27	28	29	30
31

The following events occurred in July 1932:

== July 1, 1932 (Friday) ==
- Franklin D. Roosevelt won the nomination for president at the Democratic National Convention.
- Helen Wills Moody defeated Helen Hull Jacobs in the Ladies' Singles Final at Wimbledon.
- Died: Harold Copping, 68, British artist

== July 2, 1932 (Saturday) ==
- The Democratic National Convention ended with a speech by Franklin D. Roosevelt accepting the party nomination for president. "The appearance before a National Convention of its nominee for President, to be formally notified of his selection, is unprecedented and unusual, but these are unprecedented and unusual times", he said. Roosevelt called to "resume the country's interrupted march along the path of real progress, of real justice, of real equality for all of our citizens, great and small", and pledged "a new deal for the American people."
- Milan Srškić became Prime Minister of Yugoslavia.
- John H. Curtis was found guilty of obstructing justice in the Lindbergh kidnapping case. Curtis was sentenced to a year in prison but had the sentence suspended after paying a $1,000 fine.
- Ellsworth Vines defeated Henry Wilfred Austin in the Gentlemen's Singles Final at Wimbledon.
- Jean Harlow and Paul Bern were married in a surprise wedding at the Beverly Hills home of the bride's mother.
- Born: Waldemar Matuška, singer, in Košice, Czechoslovakia (d. 2009); Dave Thomas, founder of Wendy's fast-food restaurant, in Atlantic City, New Jersey (d. 2002)
- Died: Manuel II of Portugal, 42, last King of Portugal 1908–1910

== July 3, 1932 (Sunday) ==
- Campaigning for the July 31 Reichstag elections started in Germany. 12,000 Nazis paraded in northern Munich, while 12,000 members of the Iron Front paraded in the southern part of the city.
- Tazio Nuvolari won the French Grand Prix.

== July 4, 1932 (Monday) ==
- The Anglo-Irish Trade War began when the British government voted to impose a 100% tariff on imports from the Irish Free State as retaliation for its refusal to make the semi-annual installment payments on Irish land annuities.
- Dugdale Field in Seattle burned to the ground when its wooden stands were ignited by Independence Day fireworks.
- Born: Otis Young, actor, in Providence, Rhode Island (d. 2001)

== July 5, 1932 (Tuesday) ==
- António de Oliveira Salazar became premier of Portugal, a position he would hold until 1968.

== July 6, 1932 (Wednesday) ==
- At a Chicago hotel, Cubs shortstop Billy Jurges was shot by a scorned showgirl who intended to kill the ballplayer and then herself. Jurges suffered bullet wounds to a finger, rib and shoulder, but he only missed a few weeks of playing time and never pressed charges.
- Born: Phyllida Law, Scottish actress; in Glasgow
- Died: Kenneth Grahame, 73, British writer

== July 7, 1932 (Thursday) ==
- The French submarine Prométhée sank off Fermanville with the loss of all crew.
- By a vote of 253-40 the French Senate rejected a proposal to grant voting rights to women.
- Born: Eileen Lemass, politician, in Dublin, Ireland
- Died: Henry Eyster Jacobs, 87, American educator and Lutheran theologian

== July 8, 1932 (Friday) ==
- The Dow Jones Industrial Average closed at 41.22 points, its absolute lowest point of the Great Depression and a 90% loss of its value from the peak of September 1929.
- The Rector of Stiffkey Harold Davidson was found guilty of disreputable associations with women.
- Born: John Pascal, playwright, screenwriter, author and journalist, in Brooklyn, New York (d. 1981)

== July 9, 1932 (Saturday) ==
- The Lausanne Conference ended with an agreement that Germany would make one final payment of 3 billion gold reichsmarks and then be free of reparations for all time.
- In Belgium, 2 were killed in mining towns during a day of rioting by miners striking for more pay and sympathetic labour elements.
- Born: Donald Rumsfeld, politician, in Chicago, Illinois (d. 2021)

== July 10, 1932 (Sunday) ==
- Johnny Burnett of the Cleveland Indians hit a major league record nine base hits in one game during an eighteen inning, 18–17 loss to the Philadelphia Athletics.
- Died: Richard Threlfall, 70, English chemist and engineer

== July 11, 1932 (Monday) ==
- The Swiss Federal Council in Bern adopted a law prohibiting the wearing of Nazi uniforms.
- Born: Ron Stewart, ice hockey player, in Calgary, Alberta, Canada (d. 2012)

== July 12, 1932 (Tuesday) ==
- Norway promulgated a decree proclaiming the annexation of part of eastern Greenland (Erik the Red's Land).
- The Irish Dáil refused to approve the amendments to the bill abolishing the Oath of Allegiance to the king of England, leaving the bill in limbo.
- Born: Otis Davis, runner, in Tuscaloosa, Alabama (d. 2024)

== July 13, 1932 (Wednesday) ==
- The British and French governments signed a pact of friendship at Lausanne.
- Three blocks in the west end of the famous Coney Island resort in New York were destroyed by a fire, doing an estimated $5 million in damage and leaving about 2,000 homeless.
- 3-year-old Joy Myrlene Hanny of Firth, Idaho, fell into a hot spring in Yellowstone National Park when she was startled by an eruption of Jewel Geyser. She died of her burns the following night.
- Amelia Earhart completed a transcontinental flight of the United States from Los Angeles to Newark in 19 hours 14 minutes and 40 seconds, a new record for a woman.
- Born: Per Nørgård, composer, in Gentofte, Denmark (d. 2025)

== July 14, 1932 (Thursday) ==
- English composer Edward Elgar conducted a recording of his Violin Concerto with 16-year-old Yehudi Menuhin.
- Born: Princess Margarita of Baden, in Schloss Salem, Germany (d. 2013)
- Died: Dennis Neilson-Terry, 36, British actor (pneumonia)

== July 15, 1932 (Friday) ==
- The League of Nations agreed to provide Austria with a loan of 300 million schillings on the condition that Austria not enter into a political or economic agreement with Germany before 1952. This condition was very unpopular in Austria.
- Irish Free State premier Éamon de Valera met British Prime Minister Ramsay MacDonald for three hours in London to discuss the tariff issue, but the conversation was unproductive.
- The film Strange Interlude, adapted from the Eugene O'Neill play of the same name, premiered at Grauman's Chinese Theatre in Hollywood.
- Born: Tim Asch, anthropologist, photographer and filmmaker, in Southampton, New York (d. 1994); Max McGee, American football player, in Overton, Texas (d. 2007)

== July 16, 1932 (Saturday) ==
- Rioting broke out in front of the White House by members of the Bonus Army who still refused to leave the capital. Contrary to tradition, President Hoover did not attend the final day of the 72nd Congress before adjourning until December due to safety concerns.

== July 17, 1932 (Sunday) ==
- Altona Bloody Sunday: 18 died in fighting between Nazis and Communists in the Altona borough of Hamburg, Germany.
- Leeudoringstad explosion, one of the largest man-made non-nuclear explosions.
- Rudolf Caracciola won the German Grand Prix.
- Born: Yukio Aoshima, politician, in Nihonbashi Ward, Tokyo, Japan (d. 2006)
- Died: Wiley Lynn, 40 or 41, American prohibition agent (shot)

== July 18, 1932 (Monday) ==
- Turkey was admitted to the League of Nations.
- The German government of Franz von Papen issued a decree banning all outdoor demonstrations in the wake of Altona Bloody Sunday.
- Denmark and Norway took their dispute over territory in Greenland to the World Court.
- At Loch Lomond, Scotland, Kaye Don reclaimed the world water speed record with a new mark of 119.81 miles per hour (192.82 km/h) in the Miss England III.
- The Irish Free State struck back in the Anglo-Irish Trade War when its senate approved a bill authorizing retaliatory tariff measures against Britain.
- Died: Willard Ames Holbrook, 71, American army general

== July 19, 1932 (Tuesday) ==
- Lambeth Bridge was opened by King George V in London.
- Born: Robert Jasper Grootveld, artist, in Amsterdam, Netherlands (d. 2009)

== July 20, 1932 (Wednesday) ==
- Preußenschlag: Chancellor Franz von Papen used Article 48 of the Weimar Constitution to dissolve the government of Prussia and insert himself in its place as a virtual dictator answerable only to President Hindenburg.
- Benito Mussolini reshuffled his cabinet in a surprise move as five ministers resigned. Mussolini kept the portfolios of Foreign Affairs and Corporations for himself and appointed new ministers for the other three.
- Born: Dick Giordano, comic book artist and editor, in New York City (d. 2010); Ove Verner Hansen, opera singer and actor, in Helsingør, Denmark (d. 2016); Nam June Paik, Korean-American artist, in Seoul (d. 2006); Otto Schily, politician, in Bochum, Germany

== July 21, 1932 (Thursday) ==
- The British Empire Economic Conference opened in Ottawa, Ontario, Canada.
- President Herbert Hoover signed the Emergency Relief and Construction Act into law.
- Bonus Army veterans squatting in abandoned government-owned buildings in Washington were informed by police that they would be evicted within twenty-four hours, as the buildings were in the process of being demolished to make way for a park. Enforcement of the eviction order was put off for a week to postpone a showdown when the veterans refused to leave.
- Born: Ernie Warlick, American football player, in Hickory, North Carolina (d. 2012)
- Died: Ralph Hoffmann, 61, American natural history teacher, ornithologist and botanist

== July 22, 1932 (Friday) ==
- President Hoover signed the Federal Home Loan Bank Act.
- A diplomatic row broke out at the 28th Inter-Parliamentary Union in Geneva. Italian delegate Carlo Costamagna gave a speech extolling the accomplishments of Fascism in the field of justice when French representative Pierre Renaudel shouted, "What right have the Fascists, who don't know what a parliament is, to come here anyway! What right have they to talk about justice!" When the Italians demanded an apology, Renaudel responded, "What right have they got to ask me to apologize to the government that ordered the assassination of Matteotti?" A screaming match then broke out. Mussolini threatened to have Italy quit the Union, telling the League of Nations that the country could not be insulted in the building of which it shared the upkeep.
- Born: Tom Robbins, American novelist (Even Cowgirls Get the Blues), in Blowing Rock, North Carolina (d. 2025)
- Died: Errico Malatesta, 78, Italian anarchist; Florenz Ziegfeld, Jr., 65, American broadway impresario

== July 23, 1932 (Saturday) ==
- The Geneva disarmament conference ended after six months with little accomplished.
- Died: Tenby Davies, 48, Welsh athlete; Alberto Santos-Dumont, 59, Brazilian aviator and inventor

== July 24, 1932 (Sunday) ==
- In Havana, 9 were killed and 55 wounded in Cuban police raids on the communist headquarters.
- Died: Hidaka Sōnojō, 84, Japanese admiral

== July 25, 1932 (Monday) ==
- The Soviet Union signed non-aggression pacts with Estonia, Finland and Poland.
- The German Supreme Court declined Prussia's request for an injunction restraining Chancellor Franz von Papen from taking over the government.
- Paul Gorguloff went on trial for the assassination of French President Paul Doumer, claiming he had been possessed by a demon as part of an insanity defense.
- Died: Charles Mills Gayley, 74, American professor

== July 26, 1932 (Tuesday) ==
- The German naval training ship Niobe sank near Fehmarn island with the loss of 69 lives.
- First baseman George "High Pockets" Kelly played in his final major league baseball game as a member of the Brooklyn Dodgers, going 0-for-1 against the St. Louis Cardinals.
- Born: Stephen Rosenfeld, journalist, in Pittsfield, Massachusetts (d. 2010)
- Died: Eliodoro Yáñez, 72, Chilean journalist

== July 27, 1932 (Wednesday) ==
- Paul Gorguloff was found guilty with full criminal responsibility and sentenced to execution by guillotine.
- Died: Archduchess Gisela of Austria, 76

== July 28, 1932 (Thursday) ==
- President Hoover ordered Washington police to evict the Bonus Army squatters. Some of them reacted by throwing bricks, and in one skirmish two veterans were shot. Hoover now called on the military, and the Secretary of War ordered Army Chief of Staff Douglas MacArthur to "surround the affected area and clear it without delay." Infantry, cavalry and tanks were deployed and by 8:00 p.m. the protestors had been pushed across the Anacostia River with tear gas. The most controversial moment of the affair ensued an hour later, as MacArthur disobeyed orders and sent the military across the bridge, driving away the veterans and setting fire to their camp. The entire episode became a public relations disaster for the Hoover Administration as the military's actions were seen as overly harsh.
- Two days before the beginning of the Summer Olympics, Finnish running star Paavo Nurmi was suspended by the IAAF for violating his amateur status by accepting remuneration in excess of his expenses to run five exhibition races in Germany during September and October 1931.
- The horror film White Zombie was released.
- Born: Jacob Neusner, scholar of Judaism, in Hartford, Connecticut (d. 2016)

== July 29, 1932 (Friday) ==
- In Hungary, two communist leaders were court-martialed and hanged on the same day, despite international pleas for clemency due to the speed of the trial and lack of evidence that they were plotting to overthrow the political and social order.
- Born: Nancy Kassebaum, politician, in Topeka, Kansas

== July 30, 1932 (Saturday) ==
- U.S. Vice President Charles Curtis opened the 1932 Summer Olympics in Los Angeles, United States, at Los Angeles Memorial Coliseum.
- US patent #1901219, the earliest known patent for a snorkel, was filed.
- Born: Edd Byrnes, American actor and singer who portrayed Kookie on 77 Sunset Strip (d. 2020)
- Died: Robert Carey, 37, American gangster (murder-suicide)

== July 31, 1932 (Sunday) ==
- The Nazis won the Reichstag elections, although with 230 out of 608 seats they fell short of an absolute majority. The Communist Party also gained twelve seats as voters largely abandoned the center.
- Cleveland Municipal Stadium opened, with the Cleveland Indians losing to the Philadelphia Athletics 1–0.
- André Leducq won the Tour de France.
- Born: John Searle, philosopher, in Denver, Colorado (d. 2025)
