= August 1932 =

Month of 1932

<<	August 1932					>>
Su	Mo	Tu	We	Th	Fr	Sa
	1	2	3	4	5	6
7	8	9	10	11	12	13
14	15	16	17	18	19	20
21	22	23	24	25	26	27
28	29	30	31

The following events occurred in August 1932:

== August 1, 1932 (Monday) ==
- The Philadelphia Saving Fund Society's new headquarters, the PSFS Building, the world's first International-Style skyscraper, opened in Philadelphia, Pennsylvania.
- 500 were reported dead in flooding of the Pearl River in China.
- An explosion and fire at the Ritz Tower Hotel in Manhattan killed eight firemen.
- The Washington quarter was released to the American public.
- Manufacturing of the Mars chocolate bar began in Slough, England.
- Born: Meir Kahane, rabbi and writer, in Brooklyn, New York (d. 1990)
- Died: Arnold Fothergill, 77, English cricketer; James R. Quirk, 47, American magazine editor

== August 2, 1932 (Tuesday) ==
- Austrian chancellor Engelbert Dollfuss survived a motion of no confidence by a single vote. A few hours after the death of Ignaz Seipel, Dollfuss appointed a successor to his seat who voted in favour of the government on the confidence motion to cause an 81–81 tie. If Seipel had lived a few more hours, his seat would have been vacant due to illness and the Dollfuss government would have fallen.
- The government of Paraguay ordered a battalion of newly recruited troops into the disputed Gran Chaco region following reports that Bolivian soldiers had attacked Paraguayan outposts there.
- Tommy Hampson won gold in the 800-metre Olympic race with a time of 1 minute 49.8 seconds, a new world record.
- Born: Leo Boivin, ice hockey player, in Prescott, Ontario, Canada (d. 2021); Lamar Hunt, sportsman, in El Dorado, Arkansas (d. 2006); Peter O'Toole, actor, in either Connemara, Ireland or Leeds, England (d. 2013)
- Died: Dan Brouthers, 74, American baseball player; Ignaz Seipel, 56, two-time Chancellor of Austria

== August 3, 1932 (Wednesday) ==
- 19 countries of the Americas warned Bolivia and Paraguay that they would not recognize the validity of territorial acquisition taken by force of arms in the Gran Chaco region.

== August 4, 1932 (Thursday) ==
- In North Carolina, singer Libby Holman was indicted for murder in the death of her husband.
- An editorial by Benito Mussolini was published in Il Popolo d'Italia titled "Political and Social Doctrine", in which he wrote that "Fascism does not believe either in the possibility or usefulness of perpetual peace and rejects pacifism as cowardice and renunciation of struggle. Only war carries human energy to the highest tension and prints the seal of nobility on the peoples which have the virtues to confront it."

== August 5, 1932 (Friday) ==
- Carl Gustaf Ekman resigned as Prime Minister of Sweden over a political contributions scandal.
- Detroit Tigers pitcher Tommy Bridges came within one out of a perfect game against the Washington Senators, but Dave Harris hit a bloop single and Bridges had to settle for a 1-hit shutout.
- Born: Ja'net Dubois, actress, dancer, and singer, in Philadelphia, Pennsylvania (d. 2020)
- Died: After being shot and killed by two Barrow Gang members after they refused to put away their alcohol, Deputy Sheriff Eugene Capell Moore, 31, became the first of the nine lawmen the gang would kill.

== August 6, 1932 (Saturday) ==
- Felix Hamrin became Prime Minister of Sweden.
- A telegram sent from New York Governor Franklin D. Roosevelt to New York City mayor Jimmy Walker was publicized, in which Roosevelt "requested" that Walker appear before him on August 11 so that the mayor "may be heard" in respect to corruption charges filed against him by the Hofstadter Committee led by Samuel Seabury.
- The first Venice Film Festival opened.
- The first section of the Autobahn, a 12.5 mile stretch between Cologne and Bonn, opened in Germany.
- The restored Welland Canal, connecting Lake Ontario and Lake Erie, was opened in Canada by Governor General the Earl of Bessborough.
- Born: Howard Hodgkin, painter, in London, England (d. 2017)
- Died: Prince Kamal el Dine Hussein, 57, son of Sultan Hussein Kamel of Egypt

== August 7, 1932 (Sunday) ==
- Joseph Stalin declared that all property on Soviet collective farms was state property, and that unauthorized use of it was punishable by death.
- Born: Abebe Bikila, marathon running gold medalist, in Jato, Ethiopia (d. 1973); Maurice Rabb Jr., ophthalmologist, in Shelbyville, Kentucky (d. 2005)

== August 8, 1932 (Monday) ==
- Walter Lowenfels filed a plagiarism suit against the authors, publishers and producers of the George Gershwin musical Of Thee I Sing, claiming it was stolen from his own play USA with Music.
- Libby Holman appeared in court in Wentworth, North Carolina and then went free on $25,000 bail.
- Born: Mel Tillis, country singer-songwriter, in Dover, Florida (d. 2017)
- Died: Harry Shoemaker, 53, American inventor and radio engineer

== August 9, 1932 (Tuesday) ==
- In an effort to put a stop to street rioting, the German government passed an emergency decree making political terrorism punishable by death. Anyone who seriously wounded a police officer or soldier now faced a minimum prison term of ten years, and all shootings and attacks on police carried prison sentences even if no one was injured. Special courts would be established in frequent trouble spots to expedite the new laws.

== August 10, 1932 (Wednesday) ==
- Spanish nationalists led by General José Sanjurjo seized control of Seville until government loyalists put down the revolt.
- The comedy film Horse Feathers starring the Marx Brothers was released.
- Born: Alexander Goehr, English composer and academic, in Berlin, Germany (d. 2024)
- Died: Rin Tin Tin, 13, German Shepherd dog film star

== August 11, 1932 (Thursday) ==
- U.S. President Herbert Hoover began his re-election campaign with a speech in which he broke from the Republican Party's official platform by saying that Prohibition laws should be forsaken at the federal level and left as a matter for the individual states to decide.
- At a public hearing regarding the corruption charges against New York City mayor Jimmy Walker, the mayor himself appeared and pleaded with Governor Roosevelt for the chance to meet his accusers face to face, which would have resulted in a long parade of witnesses given that the Hofstadter Committee investigation had lasted 14 months. Roosevelt ruled only that Walker could present any witnesses or evidence contributing to the governor's investigation of the case.
- Born: Fernando Arrabal, playwright, filmmaker and writer, in Melilla, Spain

== August 12, 1932 (Friday) ==
- Actors Ruth Chatterton and Ralph Forbes were divorced in Nevada.
- A film production and cinema operating brand in Japan, Toho was founded, as predecessor name was Tokyo Takarazuka Theater.
- Born:
  - Dallin H. Oaks, 18th President of The Church of Jesus Christ of Latter-day Saints
  - Charlie O'Donnell, radio and television announcer, in Philadelphia, Pennsylvania (d. 2010)
  - Sirikit, queen consort of Thailand, in Bangkok (d.2025)

== August 13, 1932 (Saturday) ==
- Adolf Hitler held meetings with Chancellor Franz von Papen and President Paul von Hindenburg in Berlin. Von Papen offered Hitler the position of vice-chancellor, but Hitler refused the post and demanded to Hindenburg that he be made full chancellor. Hindenburg rejected this demand and so Hitler left as the leader of the opposition.
- 40 died in the Freeport hurricane that swept across Texas.
- Guglielmo Marconi announced he had made another advance in radio communication by "bending" ultra-short radio waves that could transmit through obstacles.
- The comedy film Speak Easily, starring Buster Keaton, Jimmy Durante and Thelma Todd, was released.

== August 14, 1932 (Sunday) ==
- The closing ceremonies of the Summer Olympics in Los Angeles were held. The United States dominated the final medal count with 41 gold medals and 103 overall.

== August 15, 1932 (Monday) ==
- Actor Donald Crisp and screenwriter Jane Murfin were married in Ventura, California.
- Eusebio Ayala became President of Paraguay for the second time.
- Born:
  - Jim Lange, game show host and disc jockey, in Saint Paul, Minnesota (d. 2014)
  - Nick Piantanida, American balloonist and skydiver; in Union City, New Jersey; killed in space diving decompression accident (d. 1966)

== August 16, 1932 (Tuesday) ==
- British Prime Minister Ramsay MacDonald announced the Communal Award for India, which would allow Muslim, European and Sikh voters to elect their candidates by voting in separate communal electorates.
- The first concert exclusively dedicated to the music of George Gershwin was staged at Lewisohn Stadium in New York in the presence of the composer. Cuban Overture was performed for the first time.
- Another son was born to Charles and Anne Morrow Lindbergh.
- Died: Margery Latimer, 33, writer and social activist. Died giving birth.

== August 17, 1932 (Wednesday) ==
- The Austrian Assembly approved the loan from the League of Nations despite the unpopular provision forbidding it from entering into a union with Germany until 1952.
- The Hindu nationalist press in India blasted the Communal Award, with The Advance calling it "a gross injustice to Bengal and its Hindus", and "a thorough betrayal of sense and statesmanship."
- Born: V. S. Naipaul, Trinidad-born British writer, in Chaguanas (d. 2018)

== August 18, 1932 (Thursday) ==
- Auguste Piccard and assistant Max Cosyns ascended more than 10 miles (16 km) above the earth inside a metal ball attached to a balloon, a new flight altitude record. The historic ascent took off from Dübendorf, Switzerland and landed near Pozzolengo, Italy about twelve hours later.
- Born: Bill Bennett, Premier of British Columbia, in Kelowna, British Columbia, Canada (d. 2015)

== August 19, 1932 (Friday) ==
- Scottish pilot Jim Mollison completed the first solo east–west crossing of the North Atlantic, landing in New Brunswick 30 hours and 10 minutes after taking off from Portmarnock, Ireland.
- Died: Johann Schober, 57, three-time Chancellor of Austria

== August 20, 1932 (Saturday) ==
- The British Empire Economic Conference ended in Ottawa, Canada.
- Franklin D. Roosevelt made the first road speech of his presidential campaign in Columbus, Ohio. Roosevelt outlined a seven-point plan to revive the economy which included federal control of the stock market and more rigid supervision of national banks.
- In the Soviet Union, a bridge under construction over the Oka River in Nizhny Novgorod collapsed, killing 13 workers.
- Born: Vasily Aksyonov, novelist, in Kazan, USSR (d. 2009)

== August 21, 1932 (Sunday) ==
- Berlin sweltered through 101-degree heat, the hottest day in 67 years.
- Wes Ferrell of the Cleveland Indians became the first pitcher of the 20th century to win at least 20 games in each of his first four seasons.
- Born: Melvin Van Peebles, actor, director, screenwriter and playwright, in Chicago, Illinois (d. 2021)

== August 22, 1932 (Monday) ==
- Five Nazis were sentenced to death for killing a communist in Potempa, Upper Silesia, the first such sentences under the new emergency law aimed at stamping out political violence. Police had to push back angry crowds that tried to storm the courthouse after the sentence was read.
- BBC Television broadcast its first experimental television programme.
- Died: William Clegg, 80, English footballer and politician; Wilton Lackaye, 69, American actor

== August 23, 1932 (Tuesday) ==
- Charlie Chaplin made it known through his attorney that he intended to oppose the right of his ex-wife Lita Grey to enter their children Charles Jr. and Sydney into film careers.
- Born: Mark Russell, political comedian, in Buffalo, New York (d. 2023)

== August 24, 1932 (Wednesday) ==
- José Sanjurjo was put on trial in Spain for leading the August 10 uprising.
- Born: W. Morgan Sheppard, actor, in London, England (d. 2019)
- Died: Kate M. Gordon, 71, American suffragist

== August 25, 1932 (Thursday) ==
- José Sanjurjo was sentenced to death, but Spanish Prime Minister Manuel Azaña had it commuted that night to life imprisonment.
- 12 died in a typhoon that struck Taiwan.
- Born: Luis Félix López, writer and politician, in Calceta, Ecuador (d. 2008)
- Died: Edith Rockefeller McCormick, 59, American socialite and opera patron

== August 26, 1932 (Friday) ==
- Fritz Sauckel of the Nazi Party was named Premier of the Landtag of Thuringia.
- Died: Edvard Bull, Sr., 50, Norwegian historian and politician

== August 27, 1932 (Saturday) ==
- 200,000 cotton workers in Lancashire went out on strike.
- Born: Mohamed Hamri, painter, in Jajouka, Morocco (d. 2000)

== August 28, 1932 (Sunday) ==
- In a speech in Münster, Chancellor Franz von Papen outlined his 12-month economic plan.
- General elections were held in San Marino; the Sammarinese Fascist Party was the only party to contest the elections and won all 60 seats.
- Born: Andy Bathgate, ice hockey player, in Winnipeg, Canada (d. 2016)
- Died: Jean Nouguès, 57, French opera composer

== August 29, 1932 (Monday) ==
- The Soviet Union imposed the death penalty for simple theft as a measure against rising crime.
- Died: Andō Teibi, 78, Japanese general

== August 30, 1932 (Tuesday) ==
- Hermann Göring was elected President of the Reichstag.

== August 31, 1932 (Wednesday) ==
- German General Kurt von Schleicher declared in an interview, "Unless Germany is given full equality and security with her neighbours in the near future, she will refuse to participate further in the disarmament conference." Germany sent a memorandum to France the same day stating that if France did not disarm or allow Germany to rearm, then Germany would take matters into its own hands and defy the restrictions on the country's armaments outlined in the Treaty of Versailles.
- Born: Roy Castle, television presenter and musician, in Scholes, Holme Valley, West Riding of Yorkshire, England (d. 1994); Allan Fotheringham, newspaper and magazine journalist, in Hearne, Saskatchewan, Canada (d. 2020)
