= October 1932 =

Month of 1932

<<	October 1932					>>
Su	Mo	Tu	We	Th	Fr	Sa
						1
2	3	4	5	6	7	8
9	10	11	12	13	14	15
16	17	18	19	20	21	22
23	24	25	26	27	28	29
30	31

The following events occurred in October 1932:

== October 1, 1932 (Saturday) ==
- Oswald Mosley founded the British Union of Fascists.
- Gyula Gömbös became Prime Minister of Hungary.
- Babe Ruth's called shot: During Game 3 of the World Series between the Yankees and Cubs, Babe Ruth allegedly pointed to the center-field bleachers and then hit a home run to that exact spot. Although eyewitness accounts and existing film confirm that Ruth made a gesture of some sort, it remains unclear what the exact nature of the gesture was.
- Business executive Samuel Insull and his brother Martin were requested by the state's attorney in Chicago to "return voluntarily" from their foreign havens of refuge to face an inquiry into the collapse of the Insull business empire that cost investors millions.
- Died: Thomas H. McNeil, 72, American football player and lawyer

== October 2, 1932 (Sunday) ==
- The New York Yankees won the World Series with a 13–6 victory completing a four-game sweep of the Chicago Cubs.
- Victor Emmanuel III, king of Italy, began his official trip in Eritrea and to the battlefield of Adwa, for the fiftieth anniversary of the Italian colony.
- Born:
  - Maury Wills, American baseball player; in Washington, D.C. (d. 2022)
  - Vincenzo Caianiello, Italian jurist, Minister of Justice and President of the Constitutional Court; in Aversa (d. 2002)

== October 3, 1932 (Monday) ==
- Iraq gained independence from Britain and was admitted to the League of Nations.
- Died: Max Wolf, 69, German astronomer

== October 4, 1932 (Tuesday) ==
- Samuel Insull and his brother Martin were indicted in Chicago on charges of embezzlement and larceny after the request that they "return voluntarily" to face an inquiry went unanswered. Governor Emmerson was asked to take immediate steps to bring about the arrest of Samuel in Paris and Martin in Orillia, Canada.

== October 5, 1932 (Wednesday) ==
- A British proposal to hold a four-power conference in London to discuss Germany's demand for arms equality failed.
- Samuel Insull went missing from his Paris hotel.
- Born:
  - Dean Prentice, Canadian ice hockey player; in Schumacher, Ontario (d. 2019)
  - Michael John Rogers, English ornithologist; in Sutton Coldfield (d. 2006)
- Died: Christopher Brennan, 61, Australian poet and scholar

== October 6, 1932 (Thursday) ==
- The legislature of the Mexican state of Veracruz approved a decree declaring that all Catholic priests had lost their citizenship rights and empowering the governor to seize all Catholic church property and convert it for other uses.
- Martin Insull surrendered to Canadian authorities.

== October 7, 1932 (Friday) ==
- The London Philharmonic Orchestra gave its first concert, at Queen's Hall.
- The Italian transatlantic liner SS Rex ended her inaugural trip, getting to New York harbor, enthusiastically hailed by the Italian-American people. The ship started from Genoa on September 27 and, in spite of some technical problems forcing her to an unplanned two days' parking in Gibraltar, crossed the Atlantic Ocean in the remarkable time of five days and fourteen hours.
- Born:
  - Bud Daley, American baseball player; in Orange, California (d. 2024)
  - Antonio Pizzinato, Italian syndicalist; in Caneva

== October 8, 1932 (Saturday) ==
- The Indian Air Force was founded.
- Samuel Insull fled by plane from Italy to Greece, where the United States did not have an extradition treaty.
- Born: Ray Reardon, Welsh snooker player; in Tredegar (d. 2024)

== October 9, 1932 (Sunday) ==
- In the Soviet Union, Grigory Zinoviev and Lev Kamenev were expelled from the Communist Party by Joseph Stalin.
- Born: David Plowden, American photographer (d.2026)

== October 10, 1932 (Monday) ==
- 19 miners drowned at Plank Lane Colliery in Lancashire when a fully loaded pit cage dropped into the water.
- Dnieper Hydroelectric Station opened in the Soviet Union.
- Born: Harry Smith, English footballer; in Wolverhampton (d. 2016)
- Died: Lee Bong-chang, 32, Korean independence activist (hanged for attempting to assassinate Hirohito)

== October 11, 1932 (Tuesday) ==
- As part of observances of the 100th anniversary of the invention of the telegraph by Samuel Morse, the chairman of the Postal Telegraph Company sent a telegram around the world in a record time of 4 minutes and 45 seconds. The message, "What hath God wrought", was identical to the original one that Morse sent from Baltimore to Washington in 1844.
- Born:
  - Dottie West, American country singer-songwriter; in McMinnville, Tennessee (d. 1991)
  - Sergio Toppi, Italian cartoonist; in Milan (d. 2012)

== October 12, 1932 (Wednesday) ==
- German Chancellor Franz von Papen gave a speech in Munich about a proposed new constitution that would place supreme authority in the hands of the cabinet and not the Reichstag. "The government must have the power, not parliament", von Papen said. "We need a second chamber with clearly defined rights to supervise parliament. Today the government's only means of countersetting the Reichstag is by emergency decree under Article 48."
- The drama film Rain starring Joan Crawford was released.
- Born:
  - Dick Gregory, American comedian and activist; in St. Louis, Missouri (d. 2017)
  - Yūichirō Miura, Japanese alpinist; in Aomori, Aomori Prefecture, Tōhoku region

== October 13, 1932 (Thursday) ==
- The Reverend Harold Davidson lost the appeal of his immoral conduct conviction before the Judicial Committee of the Privy Council.
- Born: Jean Edward Smith, American political scientist and biographer; in Washington, D.C. (d. 2019)

== October 14, 1932 (Friday) ==
- As part of celebrations commemorating the 10th anniversary of the March on Rome, Benito Mussolini granted amnesty to all members of the Fascist Party who had been disciplined for minor offenses.
- Bing Crosby and Bob Hope first met, outside the New York Friars Club which was then on Forty-Eighth Street.
- Born: Wolf Vostell, German artist; in Leverkusen (d. 1998)

== October 15, 1932 (Saturday) ==
- Air India began operations, as Tata Airlines.
- The War Memorial Opera House opened in San Francisco, California, with a performance of Tosca.
- In Italy, the romantic comedy What Scoundrels Men Are!, by Mario Camerini, already presented at the 1st Venice International Film Festival, was released. The movie, the actor Vittorio De Sica (in his first starring role) and the soundtrack song "Parlami d'amore Mariù" were extremely successful.
- Died: Charles Douglas Richardson, 79, Australian sculptor

== October 16, 1932 (Sunday) ==
- Albert Einstein upset existing scientific theory during a lecture in Berlin in which he said he had calculated the age of the Earth to be 10 billion years – 7 billion more than previously believed.
- William L. Shirer was fired from the Chicago Tribune due to a defamation lawsuit filed over a minor story in which he mixed up the name of a woman who had been arrested for an accident in Vienna. Shirer was promised a month's worth of severance pay, but he only received it in 1989 – fifty-seven years later.
- With a speech in Piazza Venezia, delivered to 25 thousand "gerarca", Mussolini began the celebration of the March on Rome’s decennial

== October 17, 1932 (Monday) ==
- A prison riot broke out at Kingston Penitentiary in Ontario, Canada. Machinery and equipment were damaged, but there were only a couple of injuries in the four-hour uprising.
- Croatian political leader Vladko Maček was arrested by the Yugoslavian government.
- Died: Lucy Bacon, 75, American Impressionist artist

== October 18, 1932 (Tuesday) ==
- Britain abrogated its trade treaty with the Soviet Union in accordance with the policy agreed upon at the British Empire Economic Conference.
- Jimmie Foxx of the Philadelphia Athletics and Chuck Klein of the Philadelphia Phillies were named the Most Valuable Players of the American and National Leagues of baseball, respectively.
- Born:
  - Vytautas Landsbergis, Lithuanian politician; in Kaunas
  - Guido Calabresi, Italian-American jurist; in Milan

== October 19, 1932 (Wednesday) ==
- Henry Ford gave a radio address endorsing Herbert Hoover for re-election, asking, "Why bring in a new recruit and retire this seasoned leader especially since President Hoover has already got the massive forces of defense and recovery into action?" Ford's address concluded, "It is only common sense, when a man like Mr. Hoover has been educated by experience, when he has got control of the thing he is fighting, when is beginning to show results – it is only common sense to let him finish his job."
- Born: Robert Reed, American actor; in Highland Park, Illinois (d. 1992)

== October 20, 1932 (Thursday) ==
- Kingston Penitentiary was the scene of the second prison riot in a week. Troops with machine guns were called in to assist the guards. It was initially reported that the inmates took 40 guards hostage, although the warden denied this. During the riot, several shots were fired into the cell of the imprisoned Communist Tim Buck, but authorities denied allegations of an assassination attempt.
- A ministerial decree in Thuringia required all students in that state to memorize Article 231 of the Treaty of Versailles.
- Born:
  - Rosey Brown, American football player; in Charlottesville, Virginia (d. 2004)
  - William Christopher, American actor; in Evanston, Illinois (d. 2016)
  - Rokurō Naya, Japanese voice actor; in Tokyo (d. 2014)
- Died:
  - Boni de Castellane, 65, French nobleman
  - Giovanni Battista Pirelli, 83, Italian businessman, founder of the Pirelli company

== October 21, 1932 (Friday) ==
- Harold Davidson was defrocked by the Church of England.
- The Kingston Penitentiary riot was put down early in the morning after lasting 12 hours. A later inquiry into the unrest there would determine that the prison had so many trivial rules that it was nearly impossible for inmates to avoid committing punishable infractions.
- The Communist Party of Germany called on its members to wage outlaw strikes in advance of the upcoming Reichstag elections.
- Died: Al Hopkins, 42 or 43, American country music pioneer (auto accident)

== October 22, 1932 (Saturday) ==
- Charles de Broqueville became Prime Minister of Belgium.
- Died: Anna Elizabeth Dickinson, 89, American orator and lecturer

== October 23, 1932 (Sunday) ==
- Benito Mussolini made a speech in Turin before 500,000 Italians in which he promoted the idea of a four-power pact between Britain, France, Germany and Italy as a possible solution to Europe's problems.

== October 24, 1932 (Monday) ==
- Thousands of National Hunger Marchers converged on London, where they clashed in the streets with Oswald Mosley's Fascists near Trafalgar Square.
- Born:
  - Pierre-Gilles de Gennes, French physicist and Nobel Prize laureate; in Paris (d. 2007)
  - Robert Mundell, Canadian economist and Nobel Prize laureate; in Kingston, Ontario (d. 2021)

== October 25, 1932 (Tuesday) ==
- The German Supreme Court at Leipzig handed down a mixed ruling on the legality of July's Preußenschlag decree, finding it partially constitutional.
- George Lansbury was elected Leader of the Labour Party in Britain.
- In Turin, Mussolini and the Senator Giovanni Agnelli inaugurated the Turin-Milan highway. The same day, Mussolini said in a speech in Milan that all Europe would be Fascist within a decade.

== October 26, 1932 (Wednesday) ==
- 19 Jewish students were injured in disturbances by Nazis at the University of Vienna.
- Charlie Chaplin won his legal action against ex-wife Lita Grey seeking to prevent her from entering their two young sons into film acting. The judge ruled that the children should not be placed in films without the consent of both parents.
- Died: Margaret Brown, 65, American socialite, philanthropist and activist

== October 27, 1932 (Thursday) ==
- Tens of thousands of National Hunger Marchers from all over Britain gathered in London's Hyde Park protesting against Britain's dole system. When a brick was thrown through a post office window at Great Cumberland Place, mounted police charged with clubs and rioting began, resulting in 60–70 injuries and numerous arrests.
- The book Greek Memories by Compton Mackenzie was banned in the United Kingdom for revealing who headed the Secret Intelligence Service during the Great War.
- Benito Mussolini opened the Exhibition of the Fascist Revolution at the Palazzo delle Esposizioni in Rome, consisting of 15,000 different objects portraying the rise of Fascism from the beginning of the Great War in 1914 to the March on Rome in 1922.
- Born:
  - Harry Gregg, footballer and manager; in Magherafelt, Northern Ireland (d. 2020)
  - Dolores Moore, American baseball player, in Chicago (d. 2000)
  - Sylvia Plath, American writer, in Boston, Massachusetts (d. 1963)
- Died: Romolo Tranquilli, 28, Italian antifascist in the Procida jail, where he served a twelve years sentence for communist activity; his demise was caused by the tortures and abuses inflicted by the fascist police. He was the brother of Ignazio Silone who dedicated to his memory the first novel (Fontamara).

== October 28, 1932 (Friday) ==
- Mussolini opened the Via dei Fori Imperiali in Rome.
- A general election was held in Honduras. The National Party of Honduras candidate Tiburcio Carías Andino was elected the new president.
- Born:
  - Spyros Kyprianou, Cypriot politician; in Limassol (d. 2002)
  - Suzy Parker, American model and actress; in Long Island City, New York (d. 2003)

== October 29, 1932 (Saturday) ==
- Jan Malypetr became Prime Minister of Czechoslovakia.
- The opera Der Schmied von Gent by Franz Schreker was performed for the first time at the Städtische Oper in Berlin.
- For the March on Rome's decennial, enrollments in the National Fascist Party, suspended from March 1931, were reopened.
- Born: Bernie Fuchs, American illustrator; in O'Fallon, Illinois (d. 2009)
- Died: Joseph Babinski, 74, French neurologist

== October 30, 1932 (Sunday) ==
- General elections were held in Chile. Arturo Alessandri of the Liberal Party was elected president.
- British police fought with Hunger Marchers outside Buckingham Palace and 10 Downing Street, resulting in 10–12 injuries.
- In his hometown Forlì, Mussolini began a propagandistic tour in Northern Italy, touching Pavia and Monza (31 October), Brescia (1 November) and Ancona (3 November).
- Born: Louis Malle, French film director; in Thumeries, Nord (d. 1995)

== October 31, 1932 (Monday) ==
- President Herbert Hoover gave a speech at Madison Square Garden in New York City as the presidential campaign entered its final week.
- Jackie Brown defeated Victor Perez for boxing's world flyweight title in Lancashire, England.
- Juan de Dios Martínez won the Ecuadorian presidential election with 71% of the vote.
- Born: Iemasa Kayumi, Japanese actor; in Tokyo (d. 2014)
- Died: Charles Terront, 75, French cyclist
