= May 1932 =

Month of 1932

<<	May 1932					>>
Su	Mo	Tu	We	Th	Fr	Sa
1	2	3	4	5	6	7
8	9	10	11	12	13	14
15	16	17	18	19	20	21
22	23	24	25	26	27	28
29	30	31

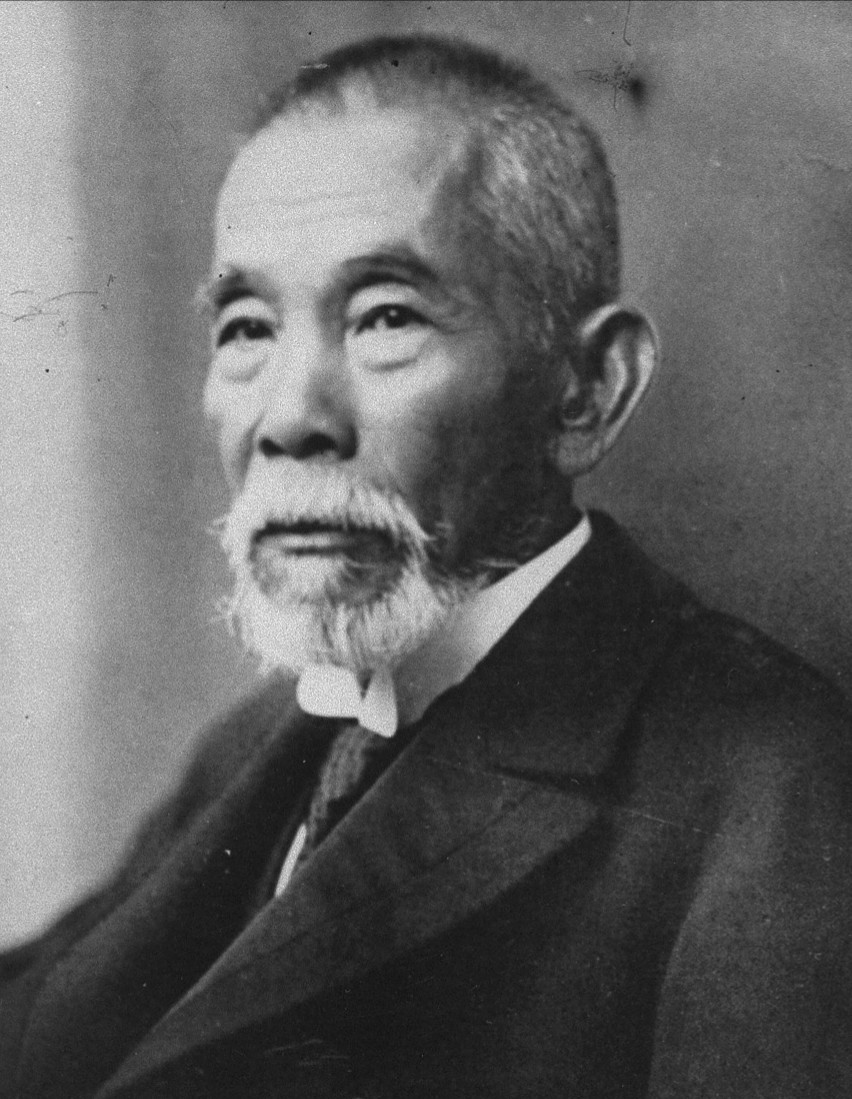
May 15, 1932: Japan's Prime Minister Inukai assassinated in Tokyo

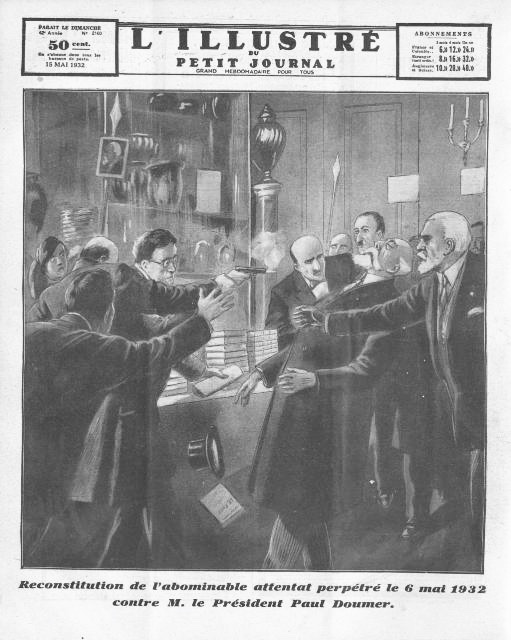
May 6, 1932: France's President Paul Doumer assassinated in Paris

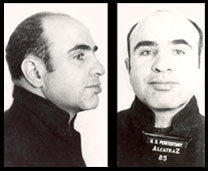
May 4, 1932: Al Capone enters U.S. Penitentiary in Atlanta as Prisoner #40886

The following events occurred in May 1932:

== May 1, 1932 (Sunday) ==
- Three people died in May Day riots during workers' demonstrations around the world, though reports of violence were down from previous years.
- In Bologna, the first edition of the Sport Lictorian Games begins; 2000 undergraduates, members of the GUF (Fascist University Groups) take part to the contest.
- Born: Douglas Day, American scholar and writer; in the Panama Canal Zone (d. 2004)

== May 2, 1932 (Monday) ==
- Baltimore repealed its 200-year-old blue law which prohibited Sunday movie showings, sporting events, and men kissing their wives.
- The Canada Dry Program, the first radio show to be hosted by Jack Benny, went on the air.
- The U.S. Supreme Court decided Nixon v. Condon, ruling that political parties did not have the right to determine who could vote in a primary election to determine the political candidates. On March 7, 1927, the Court had ruled in Nixon v. Herndon that a Texas law that had provided that "in no event shall a negro be eligible to participate in a Democratic party primary election held in the State of Texas" was unconstitutional. The state legislature then passed a new law leaving the matter to the political parties themselves. Dr. Lawrence A. Nixon, an African American physician who had been barred from the 1924 primary, challenged the new law after having been barred from the 1928 primary.
- Born:
  - Maury Allen, U.S. sportswriter, in Brooklyn, New York (d. 2010)
  - Ed Bressoud, U.S. baseball player, in Los Angeles (d. 2023)
  - Malcolm Lipkin, British composer; in Liverpool (d. 2017)
- Died: John Clum, 80, American Indian agent

== May 3, 1932 (Tuesday) ==
- The judge in the Massie Trial sentenced the defendants to 10 years in prison, but Governor Lawrence M. Judd reduced the sentences to just one hour.
- The 1932 Pulitzer Prizes were awarded. Of Thee I Sing became the first musical to ever win the Prize for drama. Journalist Walter Duranty of The New York Times won for his coverage of the Soviet Union, an award that became very controversial starting in the 1980s as historians began criticizing Duranty for presenting an uncritical view of Stalin's government and denying widespread reports of the famine there. Pearl S. Buck's The Good Earth won the Prize for fiction.
- John Nance Garner, the Speaker of the U.S. House of Representatives, won the California Democratic primary.
- Died:
  - Charles Fort, 57, American writer and researcher into anomalistics;
  - Henri de Gaulle, 83, French civil servant and father of Charles de Gaulle

== May 4, 1932 (Wednesday) ==
- Al Capone entered federal prison in Atlanta to begin serving his 11-year sentence for tax evasion.
- The Soviet–Estonian Non-Aggression Pact was signed.
- A 32-year-old prostitute was found murdered in her apartment in the Atlas area of Stockholm, Sweden. Police spokesmen claimed that the killer had drunk the victim's blood, and the press nicknamed the murderer the Atlas Vampire as a result. The case was never solved.
- Born: Susan Brown, American actress; in San Francisco (d. 2018)

== May 5, 1932 (Thursday) ==
- Japan and China signed a ceasefire.
- In Ferrara, the second "Conference of unionist and corporatist studies", promoted by the Fascist government, began. In the debate, socialist ideas emerged; the philosopher Ugo Spirito proposed the “incorporation” of bolshevism by fascism.
- Born:
  - Antonio Agri, Argentine violinist, composer and conductor, in Rosario, Santa Fe (d. 1998)
  - Stan Goldberg, American comic book artist, in the Bronx, New York (d. 2014)

== May 6, 1932 (Friday) ==
- French President Paul Doumer was shot and fatally wounded by Russian émigré Paul Gorguloff at a book fair in Paris. Doumer was rushed to hospital but died the next morning.
- The German-French horror film Vampyr directed by Carl Theodor Dreyer premiered in Berlin.
- In a letter to André Breton, Luis Buñuel announced his rupture with the surrealist movement, judged incompatible with his adherence to communism. Previously, Louis Aragon and Georges Sadoul had also left surrealism for analogous reasons.
- Born: Ahmet Haxhiu, Kosovo political activist, in Pristina, SR Serbia, Yugoslavia (d. 1994)
- Died: Ludwig Rottenberg, 66, Austrian-born German composer and conductor

== May 7, 1932 (Saturday) ==
- Burgoo King won the Kentucky Derby.
- Born:
  - Jordi Bonet, Spanish Catalan-born Canadian artist, in Barcelona (d. 1979)
  - Jenny Joseph, English poet, in Birmingham (d. 2018)
- Died: Paul Doumer, 75, President of France, died of wounds from being shot the day before.
- Albert Thomas, 53, first director of the International Labour Office.

== May 8, 1932 (Sunday) ==
- Landslides killed 32 people in two apartment buildings on the outskirts of Lyon in France.
- The second round of the French legislative election was held. The coalition of left-wing parties known as the Cartel des Gauches edged out the centrists and conservatives.

== May 9, 1932 (Monday) ==
- U.S. President Herbert Hoover vetoed a bill that would have allowed civilians who served in the Quartermaster Corps to stay in old soldiers' homes, explaining it would set a precedent for similar benefits to be expanded to include other civilians.
- Adele Astaire married Lord Charles Cavendish and left the stage.
- Born: Geraldine McEwan, English actress; in Old Windsor, Berkshire (d. 2015)

== May 10, 1932 (Tuesday) ==
- Four thousand relief workers in New Zealand marched on parliament in Wellington demanding the repeal of the Unemployment Amendment Act, which increased the levy of income other than salaries and wages. Public Works Minister Gordon Coates announced that the crowd would have to wait a day for a government response, which sparked a riot. Over 200 windows were smashed and some shops were looted before police gained control of the city centre.

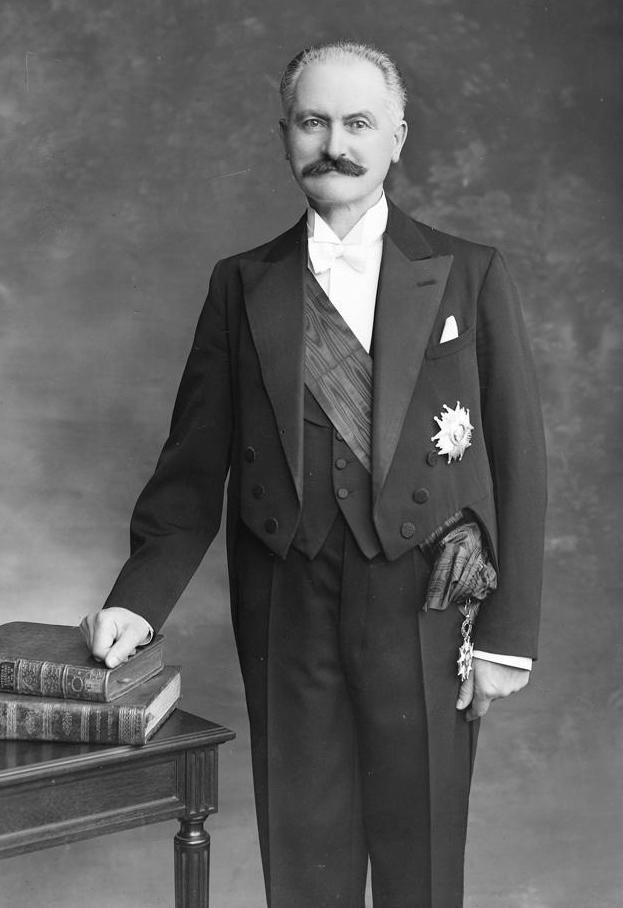
President Lebrun

- Albert François Lebrun became the new President of France following the assassination of Paul Doumer .

== May 11, 1932 (Wednesday) ==
- Britain warned the Irish Free State that it would lose tariff preference if it abolished the Oath of Allegiance to the King.
- Club Atlético River Plate was founded in Uruguay.
- In San Diego, the dirigible USS Akron, during an attempted landing, suddenly lurched upward, carrying with it four sailors who were handling its lines. Of the four unfortunate men, one suffered a broken arm, two fell to their deaths, and the fourth, C. M. Cowart, was rescued after dangling for nearly two hours.
- Born:
  - Mustafa Tlass, Syrian military officer and politician; in Al-Rastan, French Mandate of Syria (d. 2017)
  - Valentino Garavani, Italian fashion designer; in Voghera, Province of Pavia, Lombardy (d. 2026)

== May 12, 1932 (Thursday) ==
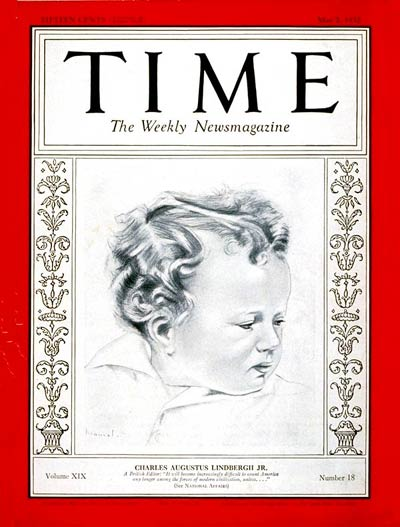
Charles Augustus Lindbergh Jr. on the May 2 cover of Time magazine

- The body of Charles Lindbergh Jr., who had been kidnapped from his home on March 1, was found less than five miles from the Lindbergh home. The condition of the body indicated that the child had been murdered, and quite some time ago.
- German Reichstag President Paul Löbe suspended four Nazi legislators from the chamber for 30 days after they had assaulted a journalist in the building's lobby. When the four members refused to leave the building, Löbe shut down the entire Reichstag session.
- Wilhelm Groener resigned as Germany's Minister of Defense.
- The George Washington Masonic National Memorial opened in Alexandria, Virginia.
- Died: Andreas Dippel, 65, German-born operatic tenor and impresario.
- Born: Umberto Bindi, Italian singer-songwriter, in Bogliasco (d. 2002)

== May 13, 1932 (Friday) ==
- Former king Alfonso XIII of Spain, visiting his son at port in France in Marseille, was attacked without warning by a Spanish republican who struck him several times in the face before being apprehended.
- New South Wales Premier Jack Lang was dismissed by the Governor of New South Wales, Sir Philip Game, at the climax of the NSW constitutional crisis.
- Born: Gianni Boncompagni, Italian radio host and TV author, in Arezzo (d. 2017); Francine Pascal, author, in Manhattan, New York (d. 2024)
- Yuri Ahronovitch, Israeli conductor, in Leningrad (d. 2002).

== May 14, 1932 (Saturday) ==
- Mexico broke off diplomatic relations with Peru after the Peruvian government accused Mexican diplomats of plotting to disturb the public order.
- Burgoo King won the Preakness Stakes horse race.

== May 15, 1932 (Sunday) ==
- Japanese Prime Minister Inukai Tsuyoshi was assassinated by a group of young naval officers and army cadets, while other groups tried to attack the police headquarters and power station of Tokyo.
- German pilot Hans Bertram and his mechanic Adolph Klausmann disappeared in northern Australia during a round-the-world goodwill trip.
- Born: John Glen, English film director, in Sunbury-on-Thames

== May 16, 1932 (Monday) ==
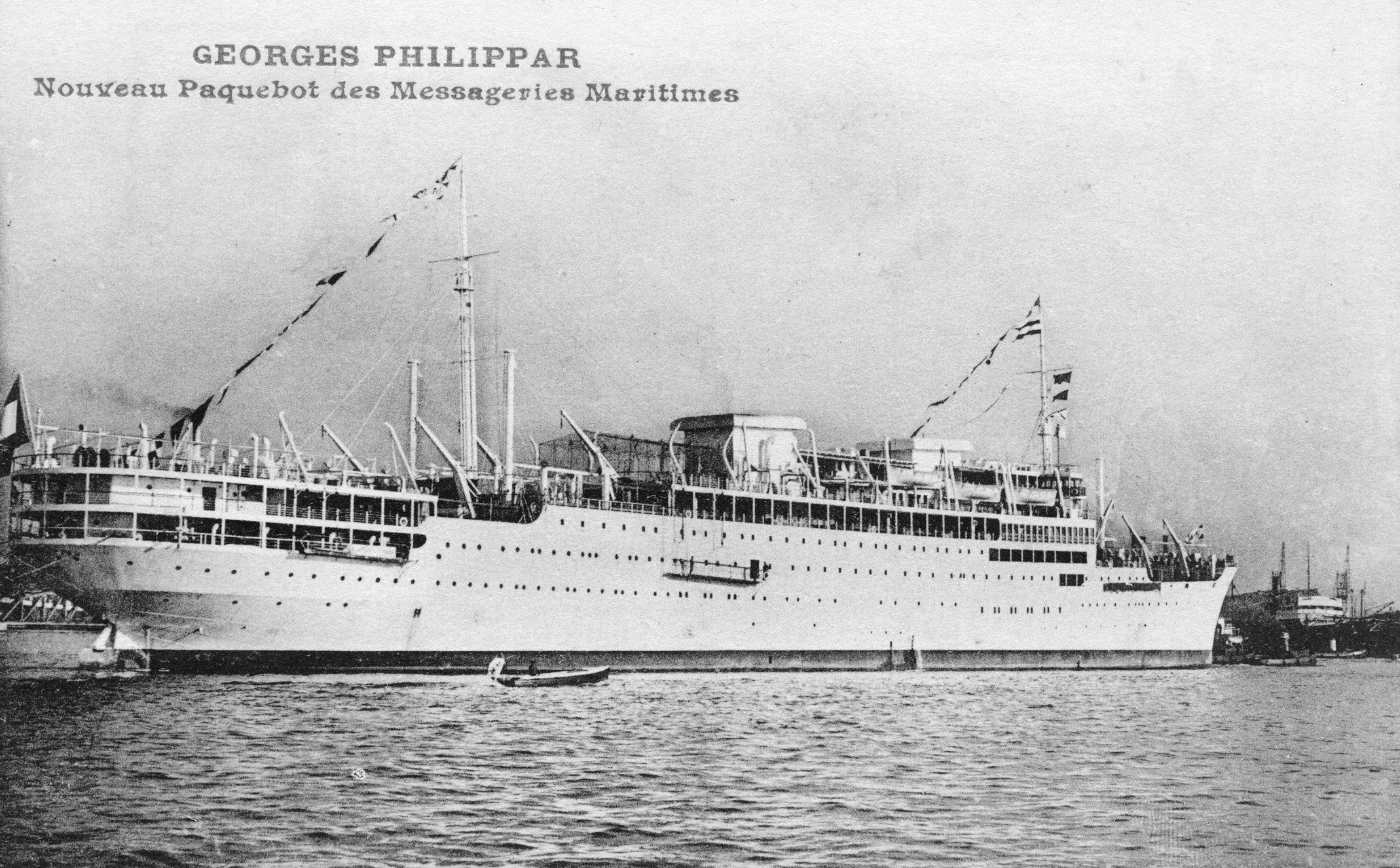
The ocean liner Georges Philippar

- Fifty-four people were killed when a fire broke out aboard the ocean liner MS Georges Philippar, which was out to sea, 145 miles (233 km) off of the coast of Africa near Cape Guardafui, Italian Somaliland. The other passengers were rescued by ships in the area.
- Died: Albert Londres, 47, French journalist, was killed in the Georges Philippar fire.

== May 17, 1932 (Tuesday) ==
- British Indian troops put down four days of Hindu-Muslim race rioting in Bombay by firing on the crowds. A total of 88 people died in the riots.
- John Hughes Curtis, a boatbuilder who offered his services to Charles Lindbergh, pretending to be in touch with his son's kidnappers, was arrested for obstruction to justice, after having confessed that it all had been a hoax.
- Born:
  - Chris Ballingall, baseball player for the AAGPBL, in Ann Arbor, Michigan (d. 2025)
  - Billy Hoeft, baseball player, in Oshkosh, Wisconsin (d. 2010)
  - Miroslav Vlk, Czech Catholic prelate, in Sepekov (d. 2017).
- Died: Frederick C. Billard, 58, Commandant of the U.S. Coast Guard

== May 18, 1932 (Wednesday) ==
- Hundreds of people were jailed in Havana, Cuba for what police reported to be a plot to overthrow the government of Gerardo Machado.
- A railway tunnel under construction in Argentina collapsed and trapped 42 workers, but they were finally rescued.

== May 19, 1932 (Thursday) ==
- The Irish Dáil passed the bill to abolish the Oath of Allegiance to the king 77–69, sending the measure to the senate.
- The abandoned Georges Philippar sank in the Gulf of Aden.
- Born:
  - Alma Cogan, English pop singer, in Whitechapel, East London (d. 1966)
  - Paul Erdman, Canadian economist and novelist, in Strafford (Ontario), (d. 2007).

== May 20, 1932 (Friday) ==
- The American Friends of Lafayette is founded at Lafayette College in Easton, Pennsylvania.
- The Torbet-I-Kheydarly earthquake in Persia killed 1,070 people.
- Engelbert Dollfuss became Chancellor of Austria.
- Died: James "Bubber" Miley, 29, American jazz trumpet and cornet player, died of tuberculosis.

== May 21, 1932 (Saturday) ==
- Amelia Earhart landed in a field at Culmore, Northern Ireland, completing the first solo flight across the Atlantic by a woman.
- Born: Admiral Leonidas Vasilikopoulos, Greek Navy admiral; in Athens (d. 2014)

== May 22, 1932 (Sunday) ==
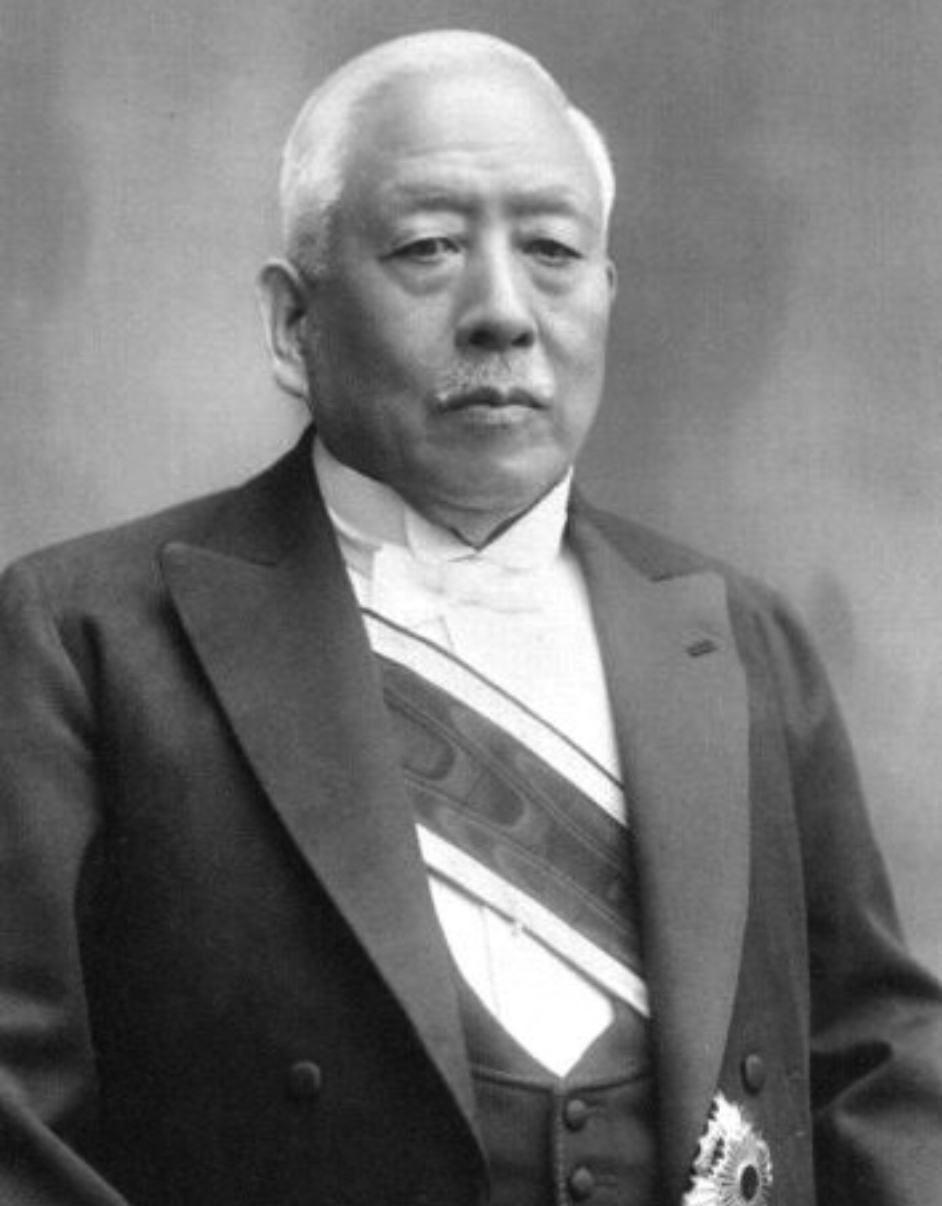
Prime Minister Saitō

- Japan's Emperor Hirohito appointed Saitō Makoto to be the new Prime Minister of Japan.
- Italy's leader Benito Mussolini opened the first International Convention of Trans-Oceanic Flyers in Rome, as 51 aviators met to discuss the prospects of commercial air travel across the ocean. The news about the Lindbergh kidnapping and the death of the Hungarian aviator Gyorgy Endresz and of his partner in a landing crash at the Littorio Airport darken the event.
- Died: Augusta, Lady Gregory, 80, Irish dramatist, folklorist and theatre manager

== May 23, 1932 (Monday) ==
- By a vote of 228 to 69, the U.S. House of Representatives rejected a bill that would have legalized beer with a 2.75% alcohol content and placed a federal tax on the beverage.
- In Geneva, Albert Einstein urged all pacifists in the world to demand complete disarmament over the next five years.
- The U.S. Supreme Court decided North American Oil Consolidated v. Burnet.
- Born: Dino Sani, Brazilian football player and coach, in São Paulo.

== May 24, 1932 (Tuesday) ==
- Germany's Nazi legislators introduced a motion to the Reichstag's committee on foreign affairs requesting that the government warn the "Polish republic that any attack against Danzig would be considered by Germany as an attack on the vital rights of Germany and would be answered as such." The motion passed, 11 to 10.
- In Pallanza, the Luigi Cadorna’s Memorial, by Marcello Piacentini, is inaugurated, in presence of Costanzo Ciano.

== May 25, 1932 (Wednesday) ==
- A brawl broke out in the Prussian Landtag in which eight deputies were wounded in fighting between Nazis and Communists. The fighting started when Wilhelm Pieck of the Communists called out that there were murderers among the Nazi seats of the chamber.
- Official visit in Rome of the Turkish Prime Minister Ismet Inonu and of the Foreign Minister Tevfik Rustu Aras.Turkey and Italy extended their non-aggression pact of 1928 for another five years and made arrangements to improve trade relations.
- Wilfred Jackson's Mickey Mouse cartoon Mickey's Revue premiered, featuring the debut of Goofy.
- Born:
  - Roger Bowen, American comedian, actor and novelist; in Attleboro, Massachusetts (d. 1996)
  - John Gregory Dunne, U.S. writer, in Hartford, Connecticut (d. 2003)
  - K. C. Jones, American basketball player and coach, in Taylor, Texas (d. 2020)
- Died: German Navy Admiral Franz von Hipper, 68

== May 26, 1932 (Thursday) ==
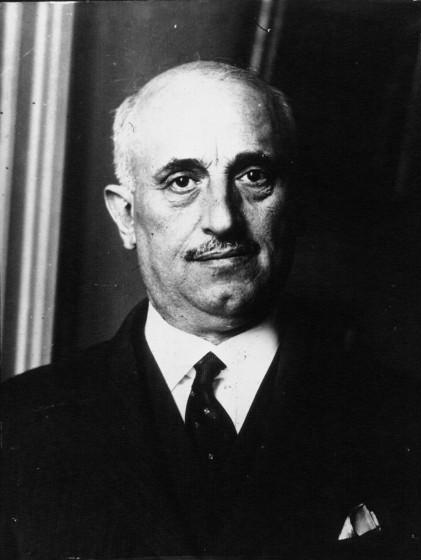
Prime Minister Papanastasiou

- Alexandros Papanastasiou became the new Prime Minister of Greece.
- A policeman and a communist were killed during a food riot in Hamburg.
- The National Police Gazette, which had gone into bankruptcy in February, was purchased for $545 by an anonymous party who intended to resume publication.
- Died: Japanese Army General Yoshinori Shirakawa, 64, died of wounds sustained from a bomb thrown at a reviewing stand in Shanghai on April 29.

== May 27, 1932 (Friday) ==
- The steamer Grecian sank off Block Island, Rhode Island with the loss of four crew, after colliding in a fog with the liner City of Chattanooga.
- In Saint Louis (Paris) congress of the Italian Republican Party; the left wing, favorable to a collaboration with the PCI, prevails; the war hero Raffaele Rossetti is elected secretary.
- Born: Jeffrey Bernard, British journalist; in London (d. 1997)
- Died: Gordon Browne, 74, English artist and children's book illustrator

== May 28, 1932 (Saturday) ==
- The Afsluitdijk dam was completed in the Netherlands after 12 years of construction, blocking the Zuiderzee inlet from the North Sea and creating the IJsselmeer freshwater lake.
- The drama film As You Desire Me, starring Greta Garbo and Melvyn Douglas, was released.
- Born: Elaine Madsen, American author and filmmaker, in Romeoville, Illinois

== May 29, 1932 (Sunday) ==
- Germany's Nazi Party won 24 out of 48 seats in state elections in Oldenburg, obtaining an absolute majority in a German state for the first time.
- Veterans of the First World War known as the Bonus Army Marchers began gathering in Washington, D.C., urging Congress to pass a bill allowing them to borrow against their future bonus.
- Juventus F. C. defeated Brescia Calcio 3–0 and won Serie A 1931-32 two weeks in advance.
- Born: Alan Shorter, American jazz musician, in Newark, New Jersey (d. 1987)
- Died: Cuthbert Christy, 68, British doctor and zoologist

== May 30, 1932 (Monday) ==
- Heinrich Brüning resigned as Chancellor of Germany.
- Six bombs exploded around the city of Belgrade, including one thrown at the king's palace that wounded a passerby. Four people were arrested.
- Fred Frame won the Indianapolis 500.
- Born: Richard Sapper, German designer, in Munich (d. 2015).
- Died:
  - William Dennison Clark, 46, American football player, shot himself to death
  - U.S. Navy Admiral John Hubbard, 83

== May 31, 1932 (Tuesday) ==
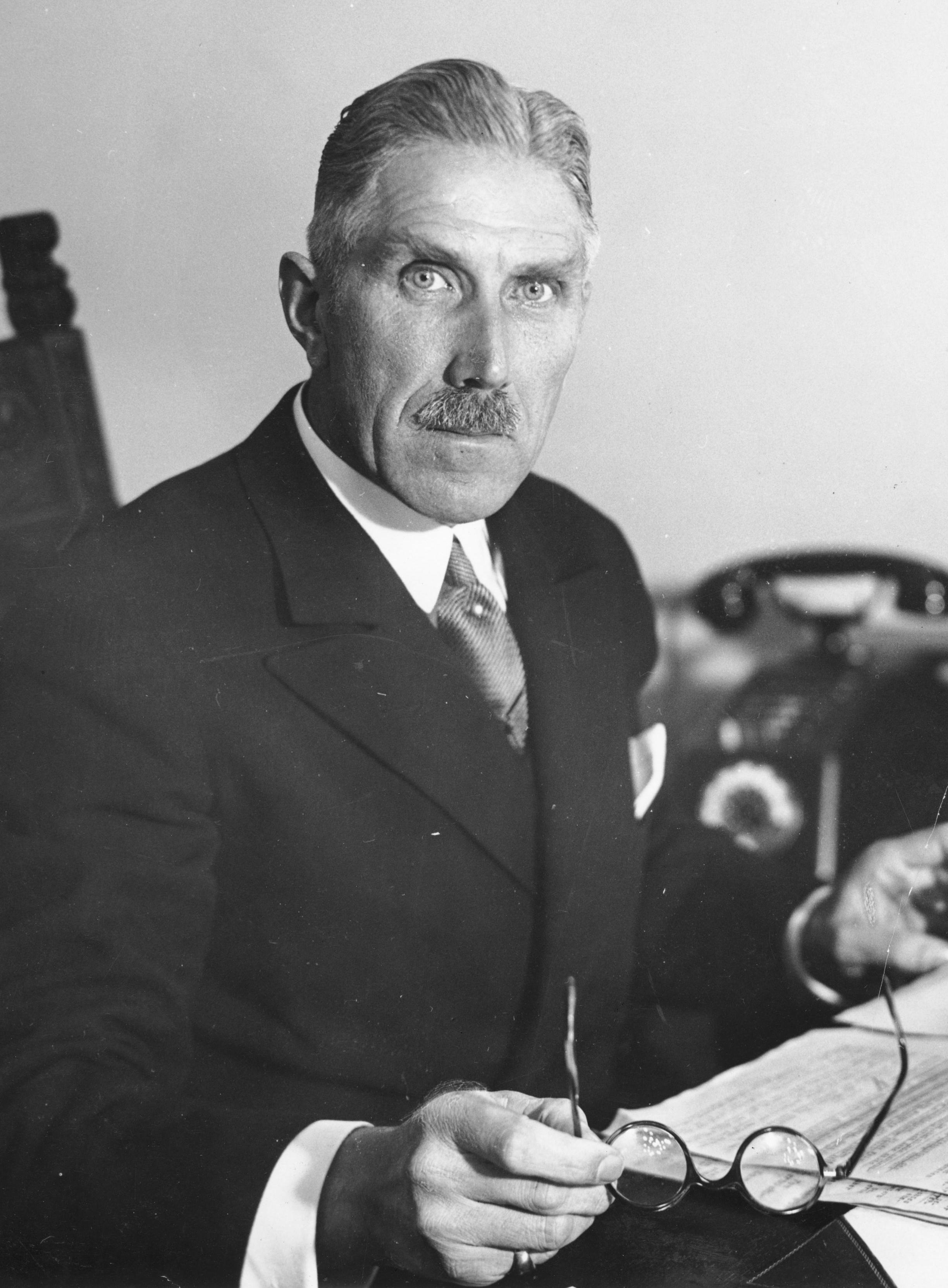
Chancellor Von Papen

- Germany's President Hindenburg selected Franz von Papen to become the new chancellor.
- Under international pressure, Japan agreed to withdraw its troops from the Chinese city of Shanghai .
- Nicolae Iorga resigned as Prime Minister of Romania.
- For the first time, petroleum was discovered on the Arabian side of the Persian Gulf. The news of the first well in Bahrain shocked the oil industry, and suggested the possibility of much greater reserves on the mainland of the Arabian Peninsula.
- Born: Ed Lincoln, Brazilian musician; in Fortaleza (d. 2012)
- Died: Emanuel Nobel, 72, Swedish-Russian oil baron
