= November 1932 =

Month of 1932

<<	November 1932					>>
Su	Mo	Tu	We	Th	Fr	Sa
		1	2	3	4	5
6	7	8	9	10	11	12
13	14	15	16	17	18	19
20	21	22	23	24	25	26
27	28	29	30

The following events occurred in November 1932:

== November 1, 1932 (Tuesday) ==
- The Liberal Party won mid-term parliamentary elections in Cuba.
- Police in London clashed with National Hunger Marchers trying to present a petition to parliament against the Means Test.
- It was rumored that Eva Braun attempted suicide in Munich.
- Born: Al Arbour, ice hockey player, in Sudbury, Ontario, Canada (d. 2015)

== November 2, 1932 (Wednesday) ==
- 12 were shot in Hamburg during fighting between Communists and Nazis.
- The Emu War is begun by the military against emus in Western Australia.

== November 3, 1932 (Thursday) ==
- 15,000 transit employees went on strike in Berlin, encouraged by both the Communists and the Nazis.
- Panagis Tsaldaris became Prime Minister of Greece.
- Born: Albert Reynolds, politician, in Roosky, Ireland (d. 2014)

== November 4, 1932 (Friday) ==
- Three were killed in Berlin during violence related to the transit strike when police fired on a mob trying to wreck street cars.
- Benito Mussolini unveiled a 54-foot high obelisk in Rome bearing his name carved in huge letters.
- Born: Thomas Klestil, 10th President of Austria, in Vienna (d. 2004); Noam Pitlik, television director and actor, in Philadelphia, Pennsylvania (d. 1999)
- Died: Belle Bennett, 41, American actress (cancer)

== November 5, 1932 (Saturday) ==
- A five-day-old strike of 200,000 Lancashire cotton workers ended after the strikers agreed to a wage cut.

== November 6, 1932 (Sunday) ==
- Federal elections were held in Germany. The Nazi Party lost 2 million votes and 35 seats but remained the largest party in the Reichstag. The Communist Party (KPD) gained 11 seats to hold exactly 100, making it the second largest. This was to be the last free election for the whole of Germany until 1990.
- Italy published a far-reaching amnesty decree freeing most prisoners serving terms of less than five years and reducing the sentences of many others serving longer terms. Mussolini called the amnesty "equal in grandiosity to the events of the decennial wherewith it is connected."

== November 7, 1932 (Monday) ==
- The U.S. Supreme Court decided Powell v. Alabama, overturning the convictions of the Scottsboro Boys.
- Born: Dick Stuart, baseball player, in San Francisco, California (d. 2002)

== November 8, 1932 (Tuesday) ==
- Franklin D. Roosevelt defeated the incumbent Herbert Hoover in the United States presidential election, winning 42 of 48 states.
- The five-day-old transit strike ended in Berlin.

== November 9, 1932 (Wednesday) ==
- In Geneva, Switzerland, the Social Democratic Party and the fascist National Union held competing demonstrations. In the resulting trouble the army fired on the demonstrators and killed 13 people.
- The Cuba hurricane killed over 3,000 people.
- Died: Nadezhda Alliluyeva, 31, second wife of Joseph Stalin

== November 10, 1932 (Thursday) ==
- Riots broke out at Breslau University when Nazi students staged violent demonstrations in protest against the appointment of a Jewish law professor.
- The crime drama film I Am a Fugitive from a Chain Gang starring Paul Muni was released.
- Born: Don Henderson, actor, in Leytonstone, Essex, England (d. 1997); Roy Scheider, actor, in Orange, New Jersey (d. 2008)

== November 11, 1932 (Friday) ==
- Latvia and the Soviet Union broke off five weeks of futile negotiations for a new trade treaty.
- Nadezhda Alliluyeva was buried in the most elaborate funeral in the Soviet Union since the death of Lenin.
- Born: Germano Mosconi, sportswriter and television presenter, in San Bonifacio, Italy (d. 2012)

== November 12, 1932 (Saturday) ==
- 25 were feared dead in an explosion at the Edge Green colliery in Ashton-in-Makerfield, Greater Manchester, England.
- Born: Jerry Douglas, actor, in Chelsea, Massachusetts (d. 2021)

== November 13, 1932 (Sunday) ==
- Construction of the Boulder Dam reached a milestone as diverting tunnels on the Arizona side of the Colorado River were filled with water for the first time.
- Born: Richard Mulligan, actor, in the Bronx, New York (d. 2000)

== November 14, 1932 (Monday) ==
- A typhoon caused heavy damage in Japan.
- An Old Prussian cemetery from the 9th century was discovered during excavations in Wiskiauten.

== November 15, 1932 (Tuesday) ==
- The Central Executive Committee of the Soviet Union passed a tough new law subjecting any worker who missed even a single day of work without "an important reason" to dismissal and the loss of all job-related privileges, including housing and government services.
- Born: Petula Clark, singer, actress and composer, in Epsom, Surrey, England; Clyde McPhatter, singer, in Durham, North Carolina (d. 1972)
- Died: Charles W. Chesnutt, 74, American writer and activist

== November 16, 1932 (Wednesday) ==
- The new parliament building of Northern Ireland, commonly known as Stormont, was opened by the Prince of Wales.
- Folketing elections were held in Denmark. The Social Democratic Party remained the largest in the Folketing.

== November 17, 1932 (Thursday) ==
- Franz von Papen resigned as Chancellor of Germany.
- The comedy film The Kid from Spain starring Eddie Cantor premiered at the RKO Palace Theatre in New York City.
- Died: Leónidas Plaza, 70, two-time President of Ecuador

== November 18, 1932 (Friday) ==
- Grand Hotel won Best Picture at the 5th Academy Awards held at the Ambassador Hotel in Los Angeles.
- British aviator Amy Johnson completed a flight from England to South Africa in a record 4 days, 6 hours and 55 minutes – 10 hours faster than the old record set by her husband Jim Mollison.
- Born: Trevor Baxter, actor and playwright, in Lewisham, London, England (d. 2017); Yoyoy Villame, singer and comedian, in Calape, Bohol, Philippines (d. 2007)

== November 19, 1932 (Saturday) ==
- The third Round Table Conference on Indian independence opened in London.

== November 20, 1932 (Sunday) ==
- An apparent assassination attempt against French Prime Minister Édouard Herriot was revealed when a bomb exploded on a railway track an hour before his train was due to pass across it.
- Born: Richard Dawson, actor, comedian and game show host, in Gosport, Hampshire, England (d. 2012)

== November 21, 1932 (Monday) ==
- Adolf Hitler was offered the chancellorship by President Paul von Hindenburg, but Hitler turned it down when he refused to accept Hindenburg's stipulations to run a coalition cabinet and respect the decrees enacted by the previous chancellor.
- In Finland, 54 members of the Lapua Movement who participated in the Mäntsälä rebellion were found guilty and given prison sentences of varying lengths. The Lapua Movement was disbanded by order of the government.
- Born: Pelle Gudmundsen-Holmgreen, composer, in Copenhagen, Denmark (d. 2016)

== November 22, 1932 (Tuesday) ==
- U.S. President Herbert Hoover met with president-elect Franklin D. Roosevelt for a two-hour discussion in Washington.
- British war secretary Lord Hailsham accused the American press of publishing misleading photographs accompanying stories on the National Hunger March rioting of October 30. The photos in question ran in the New York Daily Mirror and actually depicted, Lord Hailsham said, a crowd anxious at news of the king's health during his serious illness in 1928.
- Born: Robert Vaughn, actor, in New York City (d. 2016); Keith Wickenden, politician, in the United Kingdom (d. 1983)
- Died: William Walker Atkinson, 69, American writer and occultist

== November 23, 1932 (Wednesday) ==
- Leon Trotsky arrived in Denmark to give a lecture in Copenhagen on the Russian Revolution. Police surrounded Trotsky at the dock in Esbjerg to provide protection as 300 communists protested against his arrival, denouncing him as a traitor.
- The Romanian government said it was unable to secure a non-aggression pact with the Soviet Union due to their disputed claims over the Bessarabia region.

== November 24, 1932 (Thursday) ==
- George Bernard Shaw gave a speech before the Fabian Society titled "In Praise of Guy Fawkes", in which he declared that the election of Roosevelt in the United States "will not make the slightest difference to any American" and praised Oswald Mosley as "one of the few people who is writing and thinking about real things, and not about figments and phrases." Shaw laid out his proposal for a dictatorship, saying "you need not be alarmed by the name" because "you have never had anything else than dictators governing you although you did not call them so."
- The famous tourist attraction known as Byron's cave near Porto Venere, Italy collapsed. There were no injuries and the cause of the cave-in was unknown.

== November 25, 1932 (Friday) ==
- Symphonie Concertante for piano and orchestra by the French composer Florent Schmitt, written to celebrate the 50th anniversary of the Boston Symphony Orchestra was performed for the first time, in Boston.

== November 26, 1932 (Saturday) ==
- Bing Crosby's rendition of "Brother, Can You Spare a Dime?" hit number one on the American singles charts.
- The stage musical Take a Chance with lyrics by B.G. DeSylva and music by Nacio Herb Brown and Richard A. Whiting premiered at the Apollo Theater in New York.

== November 27, 1932 (Sunday) ==
- The Catholic Party won general elections in Belgium.
- Poland and the Soviet Union agreed to extend their non-aggression pact.
- Domhnall Ua Buachalla became 3rd Governor-General of the Irish Free State.
- Born: Benigno Aquino Jr., politician, in Concepcion, Tarlac, Philippines (d. 1983)

== November 28, 1932 (Monday) ==
- 80 political prisoners were released in Cuba. Government opponents said the move was made in response to pressure from the United States, but President Gerardo Machado said he was "acting spontaneously without interference either from the United States or any other country." Another 66 were released the following day.

== November 29, 1932 (Tuesday) ==
- The Soviet Union and France signed a non-aggression pact.
- The Cole Porter musical Gay Divorce made its Broadway debut at the Ethel Barrymore Theatre.
- Born: Jacques Chirac, President of France, in Paris (d. 2019)

== November 30, 1932 (Wednesday) ==
- Spain introduced a new law targeting foreign workers, only allowing those who permanently resided in the country for the last five years to work legally.
- The Italian ocean liner SS Conte di Savoia set off on its maiden voyage from Genoa to New York City.
- The Soviet Union said it would allow citizens to emigrate in exchange for a large fee paid in foreign currency.
- The Cecil B. DeMille-directed epic historical film The Sign of the Cross premiered at the Rialto Theatre in New York City.
