= June 1932 =

Month of 1932

<<	June 1932					>>
Su	Mo	Tu	We	Th	Fr	Sa
			1	2	3	4
5	6	7	8	9	10	11
12	13	14	15	16	17	18
19	20	21	22	23	24	25
26	27	28	29	30

The following events occurred in June 1932:

== June 1, 1932 (Wednesday) ==
- April the Fifth won The Derby horse race.
- Franz von Papen introduced his "Cabinet of Barons", in which most ministers were members of the aristocracy.
- Born: Patrick Thomas, conductor, in Brisbane, Australia (d. 2017)

== June 2, 1932 (Thursday) ==
- The Irish senate passed the second reading of the bill to abolish the Oath of Allegiance to the king 21–8, sending it to the committee stage.
- Born: Bruno Schleinstein, actor, artist and musician, in Germany (d. 2010)

== June 3, 1932 (Friday) ==
- Édouard Herriot became Prime Minister of France for the third time.
- Lou Gehrig hit four home runs in one game against the Philadelphia Athletics. Gehrig was the first American League player to ever have a four-homer game.
- Tony Lazzeri, a second baseman of the New York Yankees, hit for the natural cycle (a single, double, triple, and home run in consecutive plate appearances) against the Philadelphia Athletics, a feat that had only occurred twice previously in the history of the MLB, and 14 times to this day. He is the only player in history to end the natural cycle with a grand slam home run.
- The government of Greek Prime Minister Alexandros Papanastasiou resigned after just one week in office after being defeated on a vote.
- The first of the Jalisco earthquakes occurred in Mexico.
- Born: Lillian Briggs, rock 'n' roll musician, in Miami, Florida (d. 1998)
- Died: Dorabji Tata, 72, Indian businessman

== June 4, 1932 (Saturday) ==
- German President Paul von Hindenburg dissolved the Reichstag and called new elections when it became apparent that new chancellor Franz von Papen would not pass a vote of confidence.
- Juan Esteban Montero stepped down as President of Chile rather than try to fight a coup d'état against his rule. The Socialist Republic of Chile was proclaimed.
- Anita Garibaldi, whose remains had been brought from Genoa, was reburied under an equestrian statue on the Janiculum in Rome marking the 50th anniversary of Giuseppe Garibaldi's death. A huge Fascist parade was held for the occasion, meant to present the Blackshirts as the successor to the Redshirts' cause.
- Italian police foiled another assassination attempt on Benito Mussolini's life, arresting Angelo Sbardellotto while he was loitering outside Mussolini's office with two bombs and a revolver. Sbardellotto missed Mussolini when he left his office to go to the statue unveiling on the Janiculum and missed him again when he returned around noon.
- John McGraw announced his resignation as manager of the New York Giants baseball team for health reasons.
- Faireno won the Belmont Stakes horse race.
- Born: John Drew Barrymore, actor, in Los Angeles (d. 2004); Maurice Shadbolt, writer and playwright, in Auckland, New Zealand (d. 2004)

== June 5, 1932 (Sunday) ==
- Panama had a general election, electing Harmodio Arias Madrid president.
- Nazis won 30 of 59 seats in state elections in Mecklenburg-Schwerin, an absolute majority.
- Tazio Nuvolari won the Italian Grand Prix.
- Died: André Boillot, 40, French auto racing driver (crashed during practice)

== June 6, 1932 (Monday) ==
- Eleftherios Venizelos became Prime Minister of Greece for the sixth time.
- Alexandru Vaida-Voevod became Prime Minister of Romania for the second time.
- The Revenue Act of 1932 was enacted in the United States.
- John D. Rockefeller Jr. reversed his stance on Prohibition and came out in favor of repealing the Eighteenth Amendment, writing that he had concluded that "the benefits of Prohibition are more than outweighed by its evils."
- Lord Rothermere stated for the Daily Mail that there was no safer political prophecy than that the Hohenzollerns would retake the throne of Germany within eighteen months.

== June 7, 1932 (Tuesday) ==
- The Supreme Court of Cuba ordered President Gerardo Machado to reopen the University of Havana and reinstate 350 faculty members with full pay, ruling that Machado's indefinite closure of the university in 1930 was unconstitutional. University student council released a statement saying, "The reopening of the university means nothing and the students will not again step into the university until Machado is ousted."
- The airline Misr Airwork, known today as EgyptAir, was founded.
- Born: Tina Brooks, saxophonist and composer, in Fayetteville, North Carolina (d. 1974)

== June 8, 1932 (Wednesday) ==
- The Irish senate committee gutted the bill abolishing the Oath of Allegiance to the extent that the premier Éamon de Valera vowed not to recognize it.
- Born: Ray Illingworth, cricketer, in Pudsey, Yorkshire, England (d. 2021)
- Died: William Joynson-Hicks, 1st Viscount Brentford, 66, English politician

== June 9, 1932 (Thursday) ==
- In Munich, Adolf Hitler was fined 1,000 marks for contempt of court and threatened with prison for refusing to answer questions from a Jewish lawyer. Hitler had been called as a witness in a perjury lawsuit against the writer Werner Abel, who accused Hitler of accepting bribes from Italian Fascists in exchange for abandoning his party's demand for the return of South Tyrol to Austria.
- Born: Jack Imel, singer and dancer, in Portland, Indiana (d. 2017)

== June 10, 1932 (Friday) ==
- 3 students in Havana threw a bomb at President Machado's automobile, but it failed to explode. All three were chased down and arrested.
- Gene Sarazen won the Open Championship golf tournament.
- Born: Branko Lustig, Croatian film producer, in Osijek, Kingdom of Yugoslavia (d. 2019)

== June 11, 1932 (Saturday) ==
- Muhammad Ali al-Abid became the first president of Syria.
- The Labor Party led by William Forgan Smith won the Queensland state election in Australia.
- The United Newfoundland Party led by Frederick C. Alderdice won the Newfoundland general election.
- Died: James Edwin Ruthven Carpenter, Jr., 65, American architect

== June 12, 1932 (Sunday) ==
- The Westerglen transmitting station came on line, allowing 80% of Scotland's population to hear uniquely Scottish programming as an alternative to the regular BBC.
- Born: Charlie Feathers, country and rockabilly musician, in Holly Springs, Mississippi (d. 1998); Rona Jaffe, novelist, in Brooklyn, New York (d. 2005)

== June 13, 1932 (Monday) ==
- German Interior Minister Wilhelm von Gayl announced that government censorship of the press would be eased, and newspapers would only be prohibited if they printed false or distorted news.
- Born:
  - Bob McGrath, American actor and musician (Sesame Street), in Ottawa, Illinois (d. 2022)
  - Rainer K. Sachs, German-born American biologist and astronomer, in Frankfurt am Main (d. 2024)
- Died: Alexander Bethell, 76, British admiral

== June 14, 1932 (Tuesday) ==
- The Republican National Convention opened in Chicago.
- Tennessee congressman Edward Everett Eslick died shortly after collapsing on the floor of the House while speaking in support of payment of the soldiers' bonus.
- Harry Gabriel Hamlet is appointed Commandant of the United States Coast Guard
- Died: Edward Everett Eslick, 60, American politician

== June 15, 1932 (Wednesday) ==
- German President Paul von Hindenburg signed a decree lifting the two-month ban on Hitler's stormtroopers.
- The Republican convention voted on whether to call for the repeal of Prohibition. The "drys" won out.
- Born: Mario Cuomo, politician, in New York City (d. 2015)

== June 16, 1932 (Thursday) ==
- Herbert Hoover was officially nominated for re-election as President of the United States on the final day of the Republican convention.
- The Lausanne Conference on German reparations payments opened in Switzerland.
- Died: Felipe S. Guzmán, 53, Bolivian politician

== June 17, 1932 (Friday) ==
- The U.S. Senate killed the Bonus Bill by a vote of 62–18. Most of the Bonus Army left Washington at this point.
- Died: Angelo Sbardellotto, 24, Italian anarchist (executed for plotting to assassinate Mussolini)

== June 18, 1932 (Saturday) ==
- The Waterton-Glacier International Peace Park straddling Alberta, Canada and Montana, United States was dedicated. It was the first international peace park in the world.
- Born: Dudley R. Herschbach, chemist and Nobel laureate, in San Jose, California; Geoffrey Hill, poet, in Bromsgrove, Worcestershire, England (d. 2016)

== June 19, 1932 (Sunday) ==
- The Grunewald hunting lodge, the oldest palace in Berlin dating back four centuries to the age of Joachim II, opened its doors to the public as a museum.
- Born: José Sanchis Grau, comic book writer, in Valencia, Spain (d. 2011)

== June 20, 1932 (Monday) ==
- Amelia Earhart was thrown a ticker tape parade in New York City upon returning to America from her successful solo flight across the Atlantic.
- Born: Bill Baird, reproductive rights activist, in Brooklyn, New York; Robert Rozhdestvensky, poet, in Kosikha, Altai Krai, USSR (d. 1994)

== June 21, 1932 (Tuesday) ==
- Jack Sharkey won the World Heavyweight Boxing Championship in a controversial split decision over Max Schmeling at Madison Square Garden Bowl in Queens, New York. "I was robbed", Schmeling said in the dressing room after the fight. "Tell me, how can they take the championship away from me when Sharkey was all the time running away?" New York City mayor Jimmy Walker said it was "the rottenest decision I ever heard in my life."
- Born: O. C. Smith, musician, in Mansfield, Louisiana (d. 2001)
- Died: Major Taylor, 53, American cyclist; Alexander Winton, 72, Scottish-American automobile designer and racer

== June 22, 1932 (Wednesday) ==
- In a White House press conference, President Hoover proposed a dramatic worldwide arms reduction abolishing all tanks, large guns and bomber planes, reducing land armies beyond the minimum to keep domestic order by one-third and reducing naval tonnage by one-quarter to one-third. Hoover estimated that his plan would assure peace as well as save $10–15 billion worldwide.
- French composer Olivier Messiaen and violinist Claire Delbos were married.
- The Eucharistic Congress of Dublin opened.
- The Federal Kidnapping Act was passed in the United States in response to the Lindbergh kidnapping, giving federal authorities the jurisdiction to investigate kidnappings when victims were transported across state lines.
- Born: Soraya Esfandiary-Bakhtiari, actress and Queen of Iran, in Isfahan (d. 2001); Prunella Scales, actress, in Sutton Abinger, Surrey, England (d. 2025)

== June 23, 1932 (Thursday) ==
- Vicar General of Rome Francesco Marchetti Selvaggiani publicized new regulations from Pope Pius XI banning the sale of candles by church officials, use of artificial flowers at altars and the taking of photographs inside church during weddings or other sacred functions.
- Born: William Eldridge Odom, U.S. Army general, in Cookeville, Tennessee (d. 2008)

== June 24, 1932 (Friday) ==
- The Siamese revolution put an end to one of the few absolute monarchies left in the world. King Prajadhipok agreed to become a constitutional monarch in a coup that was nearly bloodless.
- Hitler published a declaration from Nazi headquarters in Munich demanding that martial law be imposed throughout Germany to suppress communism.
- The romantic war drama film The Man from Yesterday starring Claudette Colbert and Clive Brook was released.
- Born: George Gruntz, jazz musician, in Basel, Switzerland (d. 2013)
- Died: Ernst Põdder, 53, Estonian military commander

== June 25, 1932 (Saturday) ==
- Walter W. Waters resigned as leader of the Bonus Army as thousands of the movement's members continued to mill around the U.S. capital rather than concede defeat and go home.
- Gene Sarazen won the U.S. Open.
- Born: Peter Blake, pop artist, in Dartford, England

== June 26, 1932 (Sunday) ==
- 1 million people participated in the Eucharistic Congress of Dublin at Phoenix Park. Northern Ireland was the scene of violence as Protestants attacked Catholic pilgrims on their way to and from the Congress by throwing stones and bottles.
- Born: Heinz Bechert, German Indologist and Buddhologist; in Munich, Germany (d. 2005)
- Died: Adelaide Ames, 32, American astronomer (drowned)

== June 27, 1932 (Monday) ==
- The Democratic National Convention opened in Chicago.
- In Flemington, New Jersey, Charles Lindbergh took the stand in the trial of John H. Curtis, who was charged with obstruction of justice in the Lindbergh kidnapping case. Curtis was initially accused of perpetrating a hoax by pretending to be in contact with the kidnappers and leading authorities on wild goose chases, but at the last minute the prosecution changed its approach and accused Curtis of, in fact, knowing the kidnappers but refusing to disclose their whereabouts. Lindbergh testified about his meetings with Curtis as a jam-packed courtroom listened in hushed silence.
- Born: Anna Moffo, opera singer, actress and television personality, in Wayne, Pennsylvania (d. 2006)

== June 28, 1932 (Tuesday) ==
- The India national cricket team completed its first-ever Test match, losing to England at Lord's.
- The People's Assembly of Siam met for the first time.
- Born: Pat Morita, actor, in Isleton, California (d. 2005)
- Died: Sibylle Riqueti de Mirabeau, 82, French writer

== June 29, 1932 (Wednesday) ==
- The Democratic National Convention voted 934–213 to advocate repeal of the Eighteenth Amendment.
- At the Lausanne Conference, the British delegation proposed that Germany be allowed to pay a flat sum to buy off its creditors once and for all.
- Franz von Papen's cabinet issued an emergency decree assuring Nazis of the right to wear their brownshirt uniforms and hold political meetings, overriding state-level laws against such actions.
- The General Dutch Fascist League was founded.
- Died: George W. Byng, 70 or 71, English conductor and composer; William Humble Ward, 2nd Earl of Dudley, 65, British politician
- Audi, DKW, Horch and Wanderer merged to create Auto Union AG

== June 30, 1932 (Thursday) ==
- The nomination process began at the Democratic National Convention.
- 50 Austrian Nazis invaded a country club on the outskirts of Vienna, smashing tables and chairs and attacking the members and visitors.
- Died: Bruno Kastner, 42, German actor, screenwriter and film producer (suicide by hanging)
