= Jewel Geyser =

American fountain geyser

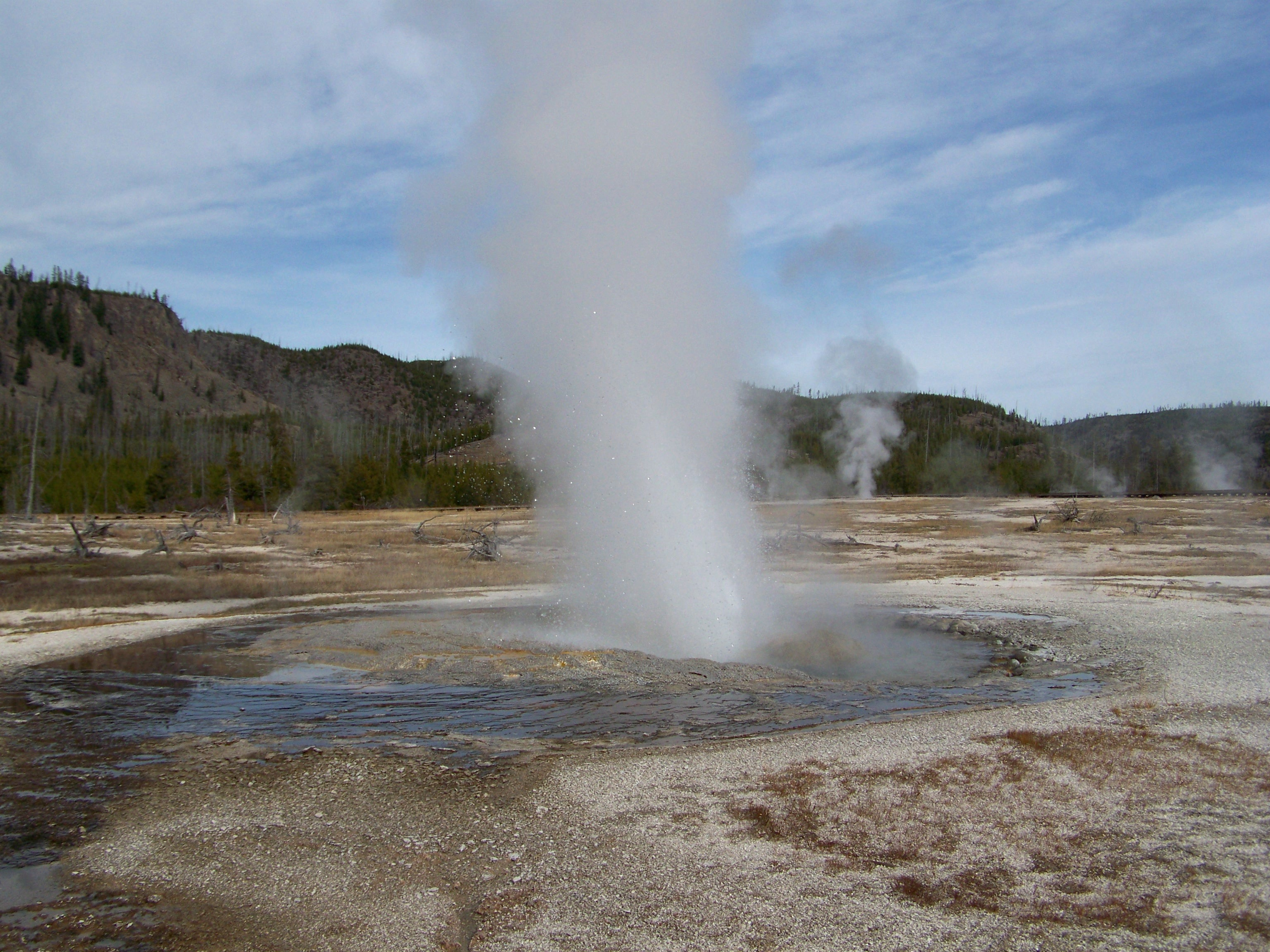
- Jewel Geyser
- Interactive map of Jewel Geyser
- Name origin: named for the beads of pearly sinter around the geyser's vent.
- Location: Biscuit Basin, Upper Geyser Basin, Yellowstone National Park, Wyoming
- Coordinates: 44.4849062°N 110.8561833°W
- Elevation: 7,798 feet (2,377 m)
- Type: Fountain geyser
- Eruption height: up to 20 ft
- Frequency: 8-9 minutes
- Duration: seconds
- Temperature: 86.5 °C (187.7 °F)

Jewel Geyser is a fountain geyser in the Upper Geyser Basin of Yellowstone National Park in the United States. It is in the Biscuit Basin complex that includes Black Diamond Pool, Black Opal Spring, Wall Pool, Sapphire Pool, Shell Spring, Silver Globe Spring, Avoca Spring, West Geyser, the Mustard Springs, Coral Geyser, and Black Pearl Geyser.

Originally named Soda Geyser by the Hayden Survey, but it was renamed to Jewel Geyser by Arnold Hague in 1887. Jewel Geyser is known for having a shiny, beaded sinter around its vent and erupting frequently.
