= Harry Shoemaker =

American inventor

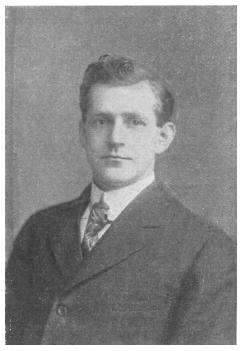
- Shoemaker in 1908
- Born: May 11, 1879 near Millville, Pennsylvania
- Died: August 23, 1932 (aged 53); New Rochelle, New York, USA
- Known for: Early radio development

Notes
- Photograph appeared on page 127 of the November 1908 issue of The Aerogram.

Harry Shoemaker (May 11, 1879 – August 8, 1932) was an American inventor and pioneer radio engineer, who received more than 40 U.S. patents in the radio field from 1901 to 1905. His transmitter and receiver designs set the standard for the U. S. commercial radio industry up to World War One.

== Early life ==
Shoemaker was born in 1879 near Millville, Pennsylvania. His early education was at the Greenwood Seminary in Millville, Pennsylvania and the Normal School in Muncy, Pennsylvania. In 1896, he began attending Pennsylvania State College.

In 1894, Professor Henry Russell conducted a classroom demonstration of the transmission and reception of electromagnetic radiation (radio signals). A fascinated Shoemaker conducted further experiments at his home, using a spark-gap transmitter, plus a coherer receiver of his own design, which used a galvanometer's needle to strike and reset the coherer after each received Morse code signal. However, he did not publicize or patent any of his early work, so when he later testified that he had constructed a radiotelegraph system, in April 1895 at the age of 16, which anticipated Guglielmo Marconi's original patent, the U.S. courts would not accept his statement, bluntly declaring that "His testimony is so utterly unsupported and insufficient and improbable that it will not be discussed".

== Career history ==
=== Gehring companies ===
In November 1899, Dr. Gustave P. Gehring of Philadelphia, a gold mine and real estate promoter, established the American Wireless Telephone and Telegraph Company, which was the first radio communications firm established in the United States. This corporation initially (and unsuccessfully) claimed to have a monopoly on all wireless communication in the United States, based on U.S. patent number 350,299, a short-range wireless communication system using magnetic induction that had been issued in 1886 to Amos Dolbear.

American Wireless and its subsidiaries primarily engaged in the florid promotion of stock sales at inflated prices to the unwary, and did only limited legitimate work toward its supposed goal of setting up a nationwide radiotelegraphic system. However, it also employed a small number of capable engineers. At its founding A. Frederick Collins was the lead technical employee, but he soon left the firm and was replaced by Shoemaker as American Wireless' Chief Engineer. In 1901 the company built stations in New Jersey to report the Columbia vs. the Shamrock international yacht races by radio, although interference from two other companies limited the transmission's effectiveness.

Shoemaker proved to be a prolific worker, and received numerous patents for improvements in radio sending and receiving equipment. Most early spark transmitters were powered by batteries or Leyden jars. Shoemaker developed an improved design, which used 120-cycle alternating current, which provided more power for stronger signals, and also produced a distinctive sound that made it easier for a transmission to be heard on congested wavelengths.

In 1902, Gehring merged American Wireless with most of its subsidiaries to form the Consolidated Wireless Telephone and Telegraph Company, and the next year a further reorganization resulted in the International Wireless Telegraph and Telephone Company. Shoemaker continued as Chief Engineer throughout these restructurings. In early 1904, International Wireless was taken over by the American DeForest Wireless Telegraph Company, which thereby acquired Shoemaker's services and the use of his valuable patents. He received a Silver Medal as Collaborator for his work at the company's exhibit at the 1904 Louisiana Purchase Exposition in Saint Louis, Missouri, and was put in charge of American DeForest's factory in Jersey City, New Jersey.

=== International Telegraph Construction Company ===
Shoemaker soon left American DeForest, joining with Col. John Firth to form his own company, the International Telegraph Construction Company, in Jersey City, New Jersey. In 1905, he constructed a set of radio-controlled naval torpedoes, which, after unsuccessfully trying to interest the U.S. government, were sold to the Japanese navy. By the end of 1906, the U.S. Navy had purchased three land and eighteen shipboard transmitters from the firm, and the company's equipment was "regarded as the best of its time by naval radio operators". Shoemaker's company also produced high voltage transmitting and variable receiver condensers, and wave meters and other measuring instruments.

=== United Wireless Telegraph Company ===
In late 1906, the American DeForest company was reorganized as the United Wireless Telegraph Company, but it continued to use some equipment originally designed by Shoemaker. In July 1908 United Wireless president Christopher Columbus Wilson engineered Shoemaker's return by the expedient of buying a controlling interest in International Telegraph company stock, and the firm was then merged with United Wireless operations, which was the largest in the United States at this time. Shoemaker become Chief Engineer of United Wireless, and his factory began to produce equipment designed for its installations.

In 1909 he was elected as one of the vice presidents of the newly formed The Wireless Institute of New York City, and in 1912 became a founding member of Institute of Radio Engineers.

=== Marconi Wireless Telegraph Company of America ===
In 1912, United Wireless went bankrupt and was taken over by the Marconi Wireless Telegraph Company of America (American Marconi), which inherited the status as largest commercial radio firm in the United States. At American Marconi, Shoemaker's job title was Research Engineer, reporting to Chief Engineer Frederick Stammis. Shoemaker brought over the equipment designs he had developed at United Wireless, and continued as the primary designer for Marconi equipment used in the United States.

=== Mallory companies ===
In late 1916, P. R. Mallory formed the Liberty Electric Corporation to manufacture radio transmitters and receivers for the U.S. government during World War One, and hired Shoemaker to be the company's Chief Engineer. At the close of the war, Mallory formed the Independent Wireless Telegraph Company, with Shoemaker continuing to act as Chief Engineer, until the Radio Corporation of America purchased the company in 1925. When P. R. Mallory moved the manufacturing activities from New York City to Indiana, Shoemaker resigned and remained in the east doing independent consulting. In May 1932 he was again employed by P. R. Mallory and Company, to conduct research work on dry plate rectifiers at the laboratory of Samuel Ruben (the founder of Duracell Battery) in New Rochelle, New York.

== Death ==
On August 23, 1932, Harry Shoemaker suffered a cerebral hemorrhage at his work site, and died at the age of 53. He was survived by his wife and two children. The opening sentence of his obituary in the Proceedings of the Institute of Radio Engineers stated that "Radio engineering and radio engineers owe a great deal to Harry Shoemaker."

== Patents ==
- U.S. patent 671,732
- U.S. patent 672,920
- U.S. patent 671,404
- U.S. patent 671,403
- U.S. patent 673,732
- U.S. patent 671,405
- U.S. patent 671,406
- U.S. patent 671,407
- U.S. patent 672,989
- U.S. patent 672,990
- U.S. patent 676,854
- U.S. patent 678,353
- U.S. patent 680,505
- U.S. patent 680,001
- U.S. patent 682,806
- U.S. patent 684,467
- U.S. patent 684,468
- U.S. patent 691,815
- U.S. patent 703,842
- U.S. patent 703,712
- U.S. patent 711,182
- U.S. patent 716,771
- U.S. patent 718,535
- U.S. patent 734,476
- U.S. patent 736,884
- U.S. patent 787,057
- U.S. patent 795,312
- U.S. patent 899,629
- U.S. patent 921,293
- U.S. patent 997,516
- U.S. patent 1,009,106
- U.S. patent 1,295,245
- U.S. patent 711,743
- U.S. patent 1,170,853
- U.S. patent 1,170,853
- U.S. patent 1,241,565
- U.S. patent 1,544,780
- U.S. patent 1,654,668
- U.S. patent 1,723,583
- U.S. patent 1,794,037
- U.S. patent 1,896,468
- U.S. patent 676,855
- U.S. patent 678,047
- U.S. patent 680,002
- U.S. patent 686,007
- U.S. patent 687,440
- U.S. patent 700,250
- U.S. patent 700,708
- U.S. patent 706,500
- U.S. patent 707,064
- U.S. patent 707,266
- U.S. patent 710,121
- U.S. patent 710,122
- U.S. patent 710,373
- U.S. patent 711,130
- U.S. patent 711,131
- U.S. patent 711,132
- U.S. patent 711,183
- U.S. patent 711,184
- U.S. patent 711,266
- U.S. patent 711,444
- U.S. patent 711,445
- U.S. patent 713,700
- U.S. patent 714,246
- U.S. patent 714,648
- U.S. patent 717,766
- U.S. patent 717,767
- U.S. patent 717,768
- U.S. patent 717,769
- U.S. patent 717,770
- U.S. patent 717,771
- U.S. patent 717,772
- U.S. patent 717,773
- U.S. patent 717,774
- U.S. patent 736,557
- U.S. patent 749,584
- U.S. patent 754,904
- U.S. patent 756,718
- U.S. patent 756,720
- U.S. patent 757,802
- U.S. patent 779,670
- U.S. patent 782,422
- U.S. patent 783,802
- U.S. patent 834,497
- U.S. patent 850,064
- U.S. patent 850,065
- U.S. patent 854,437
- U.S. patent 902,613
- U.S. patent 918,208
- U.S. patent 921,013
- U.S. patent 921,014
- U.S. patent 928,074
- U.S. patent 928,224
- U.S. patent 932,819
- U.S. patent 932,821
- U.S. patent 997,516
