= National Hunger March, 1932 =

The National Hunger March of September–October 1932 was the largest of a series of hunger marches in Britain in the 1920s and 1930s.

== Background ==
Hunger marches to London had previously taken place in 1922–23, 1929 and 1930, and 1927 had seen a South Wales miners' march. Due to the Great Depression and mass unemployment, throughout 1932 there was a profound atmosphere of unrest across Britain with "high tension across the country", "running battles between police and demonstrators" and "violent clashes ... between the police and unemployed protestors in Merseyside, Manchester, Birmingham, Cardiff, Coventry, Nottingham, Oldham, Porthcawl, Stoke, Wigan, Preston, Bolton and Belfast", many of which followed protests organised by the communist-led National Unemployed Workers' Movement (NUWM).

== March ==
With unemployment at 2,750,000, the 1932 National Unemployed Workers' Movement organised "Great National Hunger March against the Means Test" included about 3,000 people in eighteen contingents of marchers, mainly from economically depressed areas such as the South Wales Valleys, Scotland and the North of England designed to meet up in Hyde Park in London. A petition containing a million signatures demanding the abolition of the means test and the 1931 Anomalies Act was intended to be presented to Parliament after a rally in the park.

The first contingent of marchers left Glasgow on 26 September, and the marchers were greeted by a crowd of about 100,000 upon their arrival at Hyde Park on 27 October 1932. The marchers had not received much in the way of media publicity on their way to London, but having reached the capital, "...they met an almost blanket condemnation as a threat to public order, verging upon the hysterical in the case of some of the more conservative press". Ramsay MacDonald's National government used force to stop the petition reaching parliament, with it being confiscated by the police. Fearing disorder, the police deployment was Britain's most extensive public order precaution since 1848 and Lord Trenchard, the Metropolitan Police Commissioner mobilised a total police force of 70,000 against the marchers and their supporters. Serious violence erupted in and around the park, with mounted police being used to disperse the demonstrators, and across central London in the days to come with 75 people being badly injured. Home Secretary Sir John Gilmour was questioned about the ongoing disturbances in the House of Commons.

== Legacy ==
The march led directly to the formation of the National Council for Civil Liberties. Its founder, Ronald Kidd, set up the Council as he was concerned about the use of agent provocateurs by the police to incite violence during and after the 1932 marches.

The hunger marchers inspired Bill Alexander to join the Communist Party of Great Britain (CPGB) and eventually becoming the party's "assistant general secretary". Alexander went onto become the commander of the British Battalion of the International Brigades during the late portion of the Spanish Civil War. Another communist activist who credited the hunger marchers as an inspiration was Thora Silverthorne, who bandaged the feet of marchers who passed through Oxford.

The 1932 march was followed by another in 1934 and others, including the 1936 Jarrow March.
