= Paul Gorguloff =

Russian murderer, assassin of Paul Doumer (1895–1932)

- Павел Горгулов
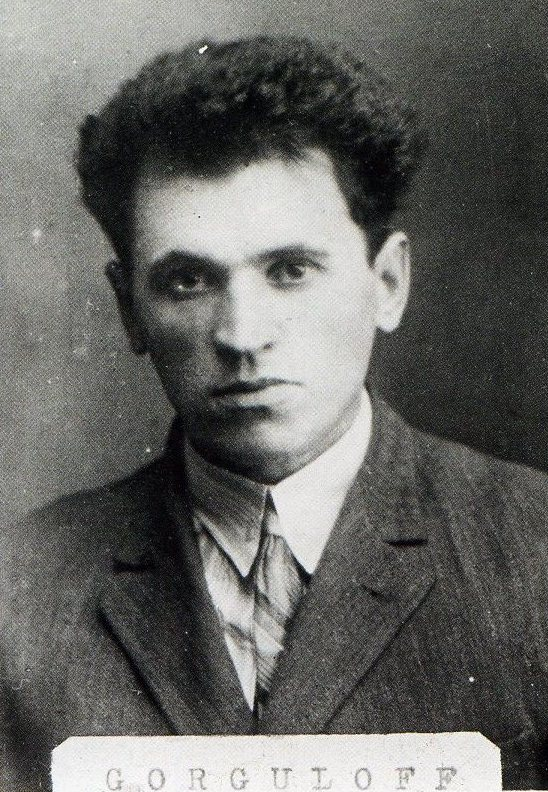
- Police mugshot of Gorguloff, 1932
- Born: Pavel Timofeyevich Gorgulov; 29 June 1895; Labinsk, Kuban Oblast, Russian Empire
- Died: 14 September 1932 (aged 37); La Santé Prison, Paris, France
- Movement: Fascism, Ecofascism
- Status: Executed by guillotine
- Motive: Revenge for France not providing more support for the White movement during the Russian Civil War
- Conviction: Murder
- Penalty: Death

Paul Gorguloff, originally Pavel Timofeyevich Gorgulov (Russian: Павел Тимофеевич Горгулов; 29 June 1895 – 14 September 1932), was a Russian émigré who shot and fatally wounded French President Paul Doumer at a book fair at the Hôtel Salomon de Rothschild in Paris on 6 May 1932.

== Early life ==
Gorguloff was born in Labinskaya, a Cossack stanitsa in the Kuban Oblast of Russia's Caucasus Viceroyalty. He was abandoned after birth, and there is the possibility that his reported birth datem coinciding with the feast day of his namesake, was actually the date he was found. On 31 January 1902, the local ataman, Yakov Dmitrievich Malama, arranged for the boy's adoption by Timofey Nikolaevich Gorgulov, the village chief of Labinskaya, and Varvara Astakhova. The names of his parents were francised to "Timothée Gorgouloff" and "Barbe Astakhoff" in his marriage record. Beginning in 1913, Gorguloff studied medicine at Yekaterinodar military paramedic school and later Moscow University's medical faculty. He served in the First World War in which he was badly wounded when grenade shrapnel injured his head. He was demobilised and resumed his studies at Rostov State Medical University. In 1916, Gorguloff contracted syphilis.

During the Russian Revolution, he served as a nurse with the White Russian Army against the Bolsheviks and spent time in Kuban and Crimea. By 1921, he reportedly served under Stanisław Bułak-Bałachowicz's army in Minsk and later Warsaw as a subordinate of Boris Savinkov before he left the territories for Czechoslovakia. Before linking up with Savinkov in Poland, Gorguloff had already left behind his first wife of four months, Marie Pagorgeloff, a fellow medical student.

Between 1925 and 1930, Gorguloff resided in Czechoslovakia illegally until he received a Nansen passport. He completed his studies at Charles University in 1926 and lived in Přerov and Hodonín for the next two years. He perforied abortions, which was illegal at the time. Gorguloff married twice: Emilienne Nehafilova in 1922 and to Kueta Stepkova in 1927. Each marriage ended in divorce, with both ex-wives citing domestic abuse. To neighbors, he claimed to be the head of several political parties of which he was the only member, including the "Peasant All-Russian People's Green Party" ("Крестьянской Всероссийской Народной Партии Зеленых") and the "Pan-Cossack Economic Agrarian Federation in Czechoslovakia". He also self-published a magazine, Skif ("Скиф"), based in Olomouc, writing three issues under the pseudonym "Paul Bred".

Between 1928 and 1930, Gorguloff lost his medical practice licence in Moravia for medical malpractice relating to drunkenness, dubious work ethic; his illegal abortion service, which had been linked to several deaths; and accusations of rape by two of his patients. Colleagues of Gorguloff described him as an uneducated charlatan, who frequently peddled quack medicine for incurable conditions at exorbitant prices. Facing imminent expulsion from Czechoslovakia, he subsequently arrived in France on 12 July 1930 on a twelve-day travel visa with the intention of gaining citizenship through service in the French Foreign Legion, but he remained undetected in Paris for the next 18 months. Living in Boulogne-Billancourt, Gorguloff earned an income by acting as a doctor to the city's Russian community, as his Russian and Czechoslovak diplomas were not recognised. On 18 July 1931, he married Anne-Maria Geng, a Swiss woman from Winterthur, who was pregnant with his child at the time of his trial.

French authorities had initially allowed Gorguloff an extension to his visa but rejected a request for an identity card in February 1931. A second attempt on 15 November while passing through Nice revealed Gorguloff's continued unregistered presence, as well as his fraudulent medical practice, and he received an ultimatum to leave France voluntarily by 30 December or face forcible deportation. He and his wife voluntarily left for Monaco, where Gorguloff lived until 4 May 1932, with Gorguloff regularly crossing the border into France. He obtained Monégasque residency status and an identity certificate, valid until August 1932. By April 1932, Gorguloff had reportedly spent 40,000 of his 50,000-franc dowry at a casino in Monte Carlo.

Gorguloff claimed to have planned for the assassinations of several major political leaders across Europe as early as the 1920s. He first planned to kill Vladimir Lenin,but was unable to enter the Soviet Union. Similarly, Gorguloff could not obtain a visa for Berlin, where he wanted to assassinate Paul von Hindenburg in 1930. By his own account, Gorguloff got close to Valerian Dovgalevsky at the Soviet embassy in Paris but was prevented since his line of fire was blocked by a large crowd. He also claimed to have encountered Tomáš Masaryk and stood right next to him, but he relented after Masaryk smiled at him. Gorguloff had also intended to assassinate French President Gaston Doumergue and the Prime Minister of Japan. Gorguloff in custody later affirmed that he still intended to carry out those assassinations, including that of Lenin, who had, however, died in 1924.

== Ideology ==
Gorguloff followed an esoteric set of beliefs revolving around an idealised version of the ancient Scythian culture of the steppes, agrarianism, and ultranationalism. Most knowledge of Gorguloff's ideology stems from his writings in Paris. One of thise writings, The National Peasant, outlines his ideal system of government for Russia: a totalitarian rule under a hypermilitarised Green party. This state would be led by a "green dictator", similar to the Nazi concept of the Führerprinzip. Gorguloff was an emphatic supporter of fascism, and his ideological beliefs are considered an early form of what is known in the modern era as eco-fascism. His last book, which police found when they arrested him, was Memoirs of Dr. Pavel Gorgulov, Supreme Chairman of the Political Party of Russian Fascists, Who Killed the President of the Republic.

Gorgulov was an outspoken Russian supremacist and believed that all non-Russians and nonmembers of Russian Orthodoxy, especially Jews, should not be citizens. To that end, Gorguloff was a firm believer in the Judeo-Bolshevik conspiracy theory. Despite his fervent anti-socialism, he despised both monarchism and free market capitalism, which he viewed as anti-peasant. In much of his poetry, he reminisces about the "wild" and "barbarian" Russia, which he believed to be the successor of Scythian civilisation. Gorguloff believed that Russia's duty as the torch bearer of "primitive spirituality" was to defeat Western civilization, which he saw as decadent and modern, as opposed to Russia's traditional and agrarian nature.

== Assassination of Paul Doumer ==
=== Shooting ===
On 6 May 1932, French President Paul Doumer attended a book fair at the Hôtel Salomon de Rothschild in Paris. Gorguloff arrived at the hotel approximately an hour before Doumer under the false identity of an author named "Paul Brède". Carrying a concealed Browning FN Model 1910, Gorguloff visited several book stands and was noted for his nervous demeanour and foreign accent. He then approached the President from behind, pulled out his gun and fired three shots. Two of them hit the President, one in the back of the head and the other in the right armpit. One of the authors at the exhibition, Claude Farrère, managed to wrestle with Gorguloff until the police arrived to arrest him. Doumer was rushed to the Beaujon Hospital, in Paris, but died the next day.

=== Investigation ===
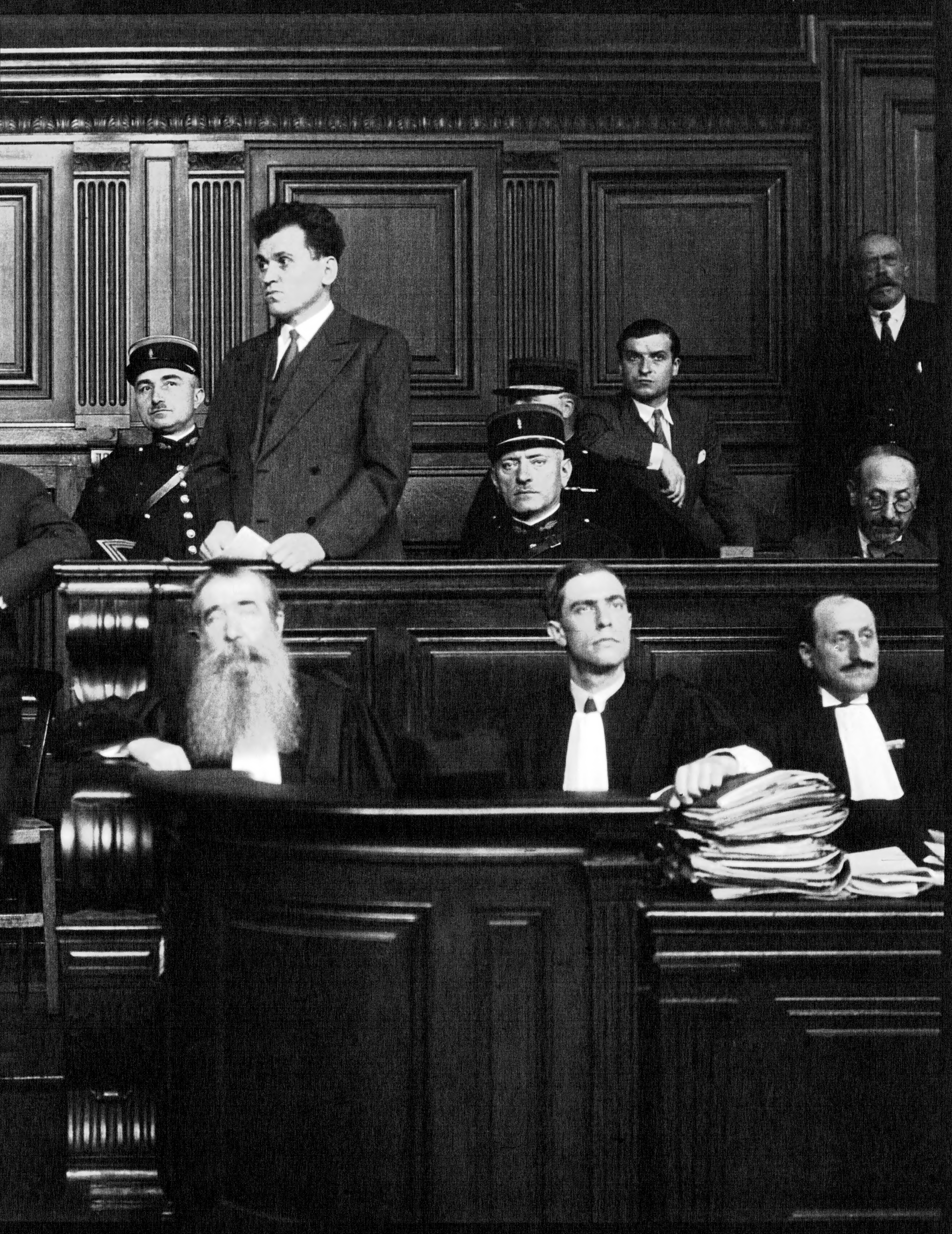
Gorguloff (standing) during his trial in Paris, 1932

While in custody, he wrote a confession letter on 9 May 1932, stating that the assassination was a form of protest against the difficulties faced by self-exiled White Russians in Europe and the United States and France's positive relationship with other Western nations and the Soviet Union. Private writings found in his apartment, which was filled with material related to his "green party", showed that Gorguloff believed France had caused the spread of "Judeo-Bolshevism" in Russia and that he was destined to bring "holy vengeance". In the same notes, Gorguloff claimed responsibility for acts of "clandestine terror", including a 1921 train derailment in Břeclav, Czechoslovakia; multiple assassination attempts on Czechoslovakia's founder, Tomáš Masaryk; the serial poison murder of pregnant women; and even the kidnapping of the Lindbergh baby, which are largely dismissed as products of Gorguloff's fantasy.

=== Trial and execution ===
Gorguloff's trial began at the Seine Court of Assizes on 25 July 1932. His defence, supported by the testimony of former acquaintances, characterised Gorguloff as a delusional narcissist. One former associate, a self-described inventor, stated that Gorguloff had once asked him to be shot to the moon with a rocket and said that he "detest[s] this earth". Gorguloff denied being mentally ill, attributed his behaviour to neurasthenia and rejected the theory that his syphilis diagnosis affected his judgement. During the proceedings, he was noted for his unusual behaviour, ranging from frequent interruptions of other people's testimonies to breaking into ritualistic prayer chants. He regularly talked at length of the "enslavement" of Russia and how he blamed France for the state of the world. On the final day in court, when asked for a final statement, Gorguloff tore open his shirt and screamed for the court to kill him.

Despite Gorguloff's self-admitted fascist leanings and once proclaiming his hatred for both communists and tsarists, the court's prosecution, along with the Democratic Republican Alliance and its allies, which included former President Alexandre Millerand and incumbent Prime Minister André Tardieu, alleged that he was a communist agent of the Soviet secret police. Conversely, the French Communist Party and other left-wing parties claimed that the assassination was a false-flag operation organised by Tardieu to justify a war against the Soviet Union.

Following a two-day trial and 29 minutes of deliberation, the jury rejected the idea that Gorguloff was insane and announced that Gorguloff would receive a death sentence. While Gorguloff welcomed the verdict as his chance to become a martyr, the Human Rights League decried the punishment. On 20 August, the Court of Cassation, France's final appeal court, rejected a defence of insanity by Gorguloff's attornies. On 14 September 1932, Gorguloff was executed at La Santé Prison in Paris by guillotine. His last words were "Россия, моя страна!" ("Russia, my country!"). He was buried at Ivry Cemetery.

The gun used in the assassination is now in the Musée des Collections Historiques de la Préfecture de Police, in Paris.
