= January 1933 =

Month of 1933

<<	January 1933					>>
Su	Mo	Tu	We	Th	Fr	Sa
1	2	3	4	5	6	7
8	9	10	11	12	13	14
15	16	17	18	19	20	21
22	23	24	25	26	27	28
29	30	31

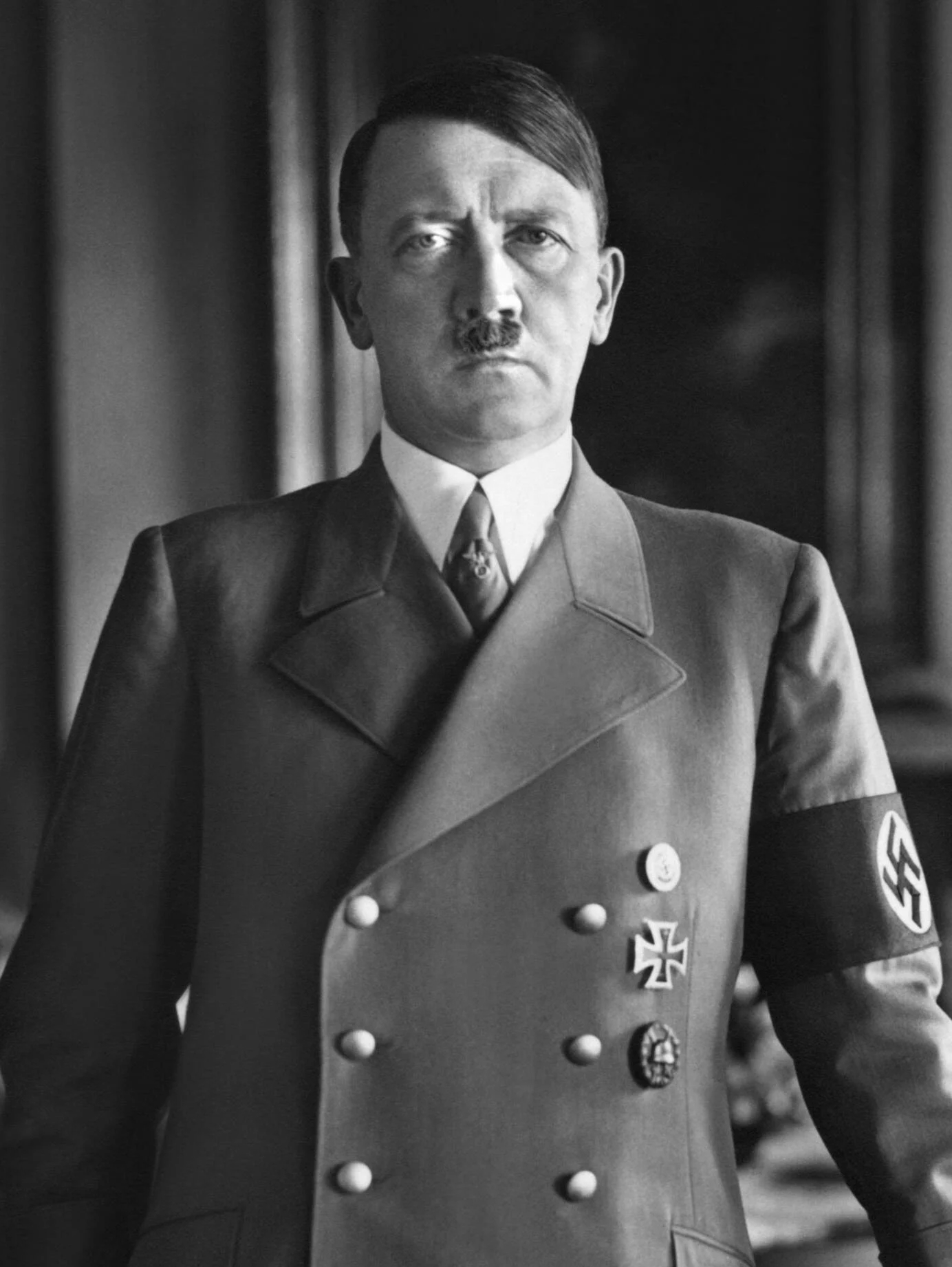
January 30, 1933: Adolf Hitler becomes Chancellor of Germany

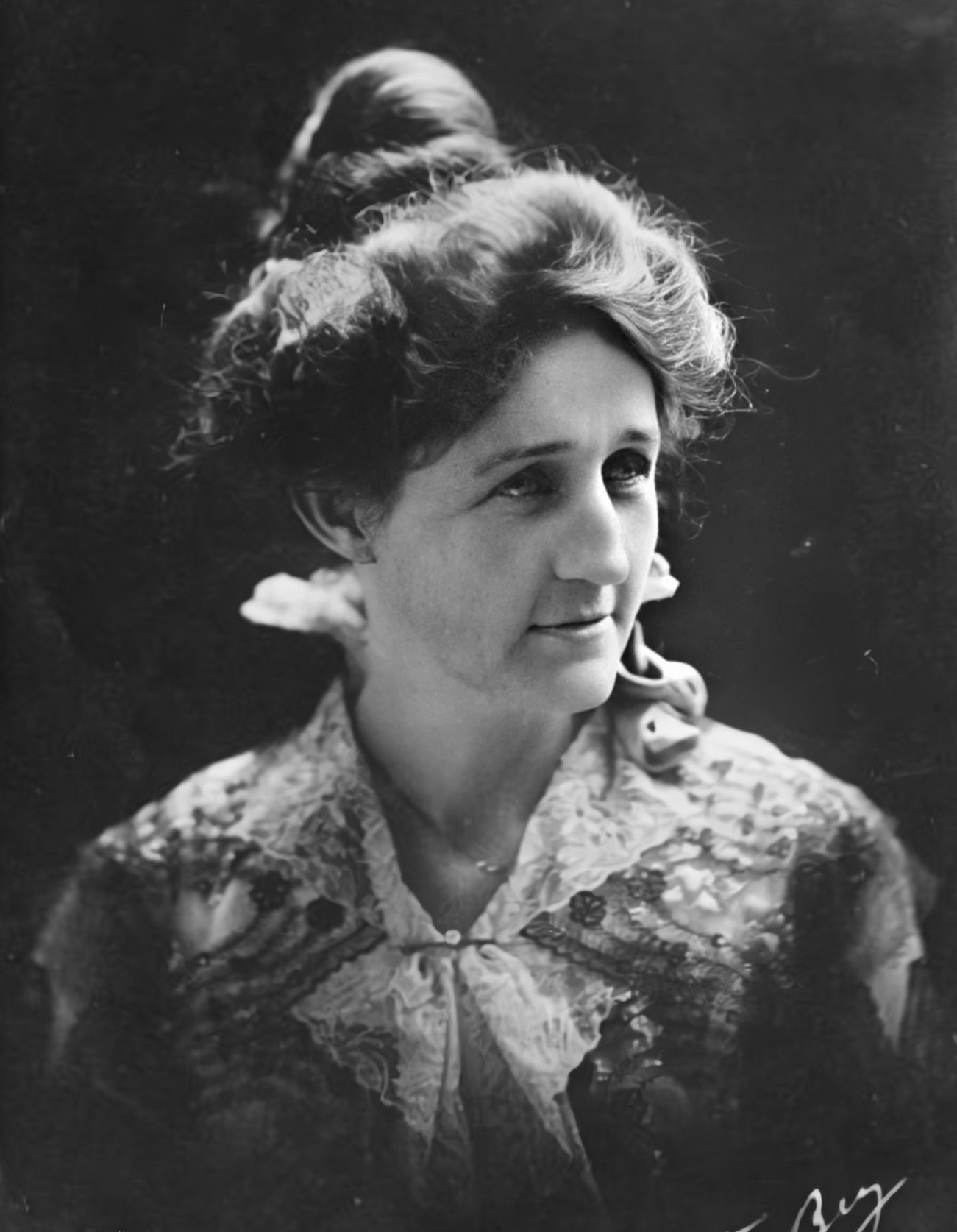
January 17, 1933: "Ma" Ferguson becomes Governor of Texas

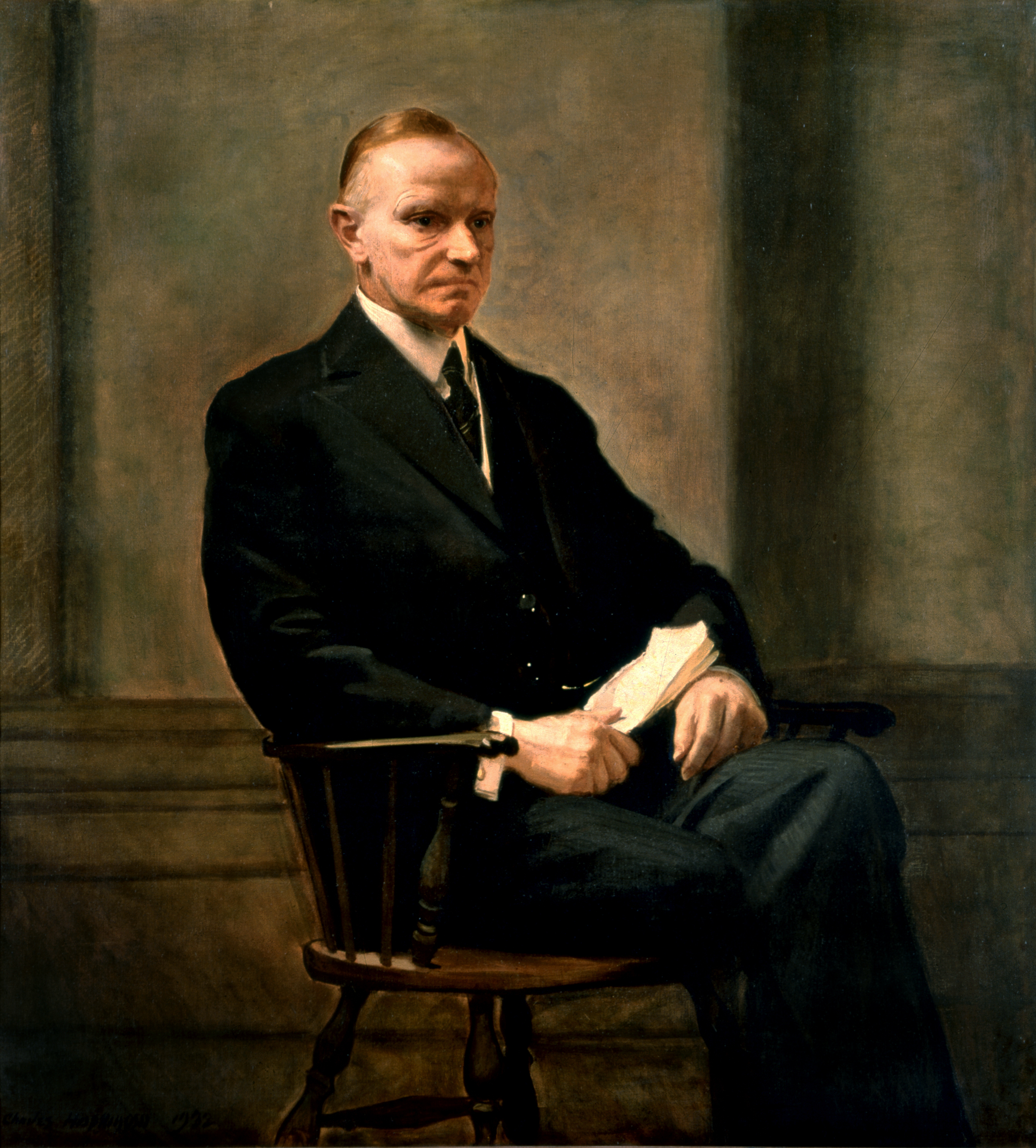
January 5, 1933: Former U.S. President Coolidge dies at the end of the term he declined to run for

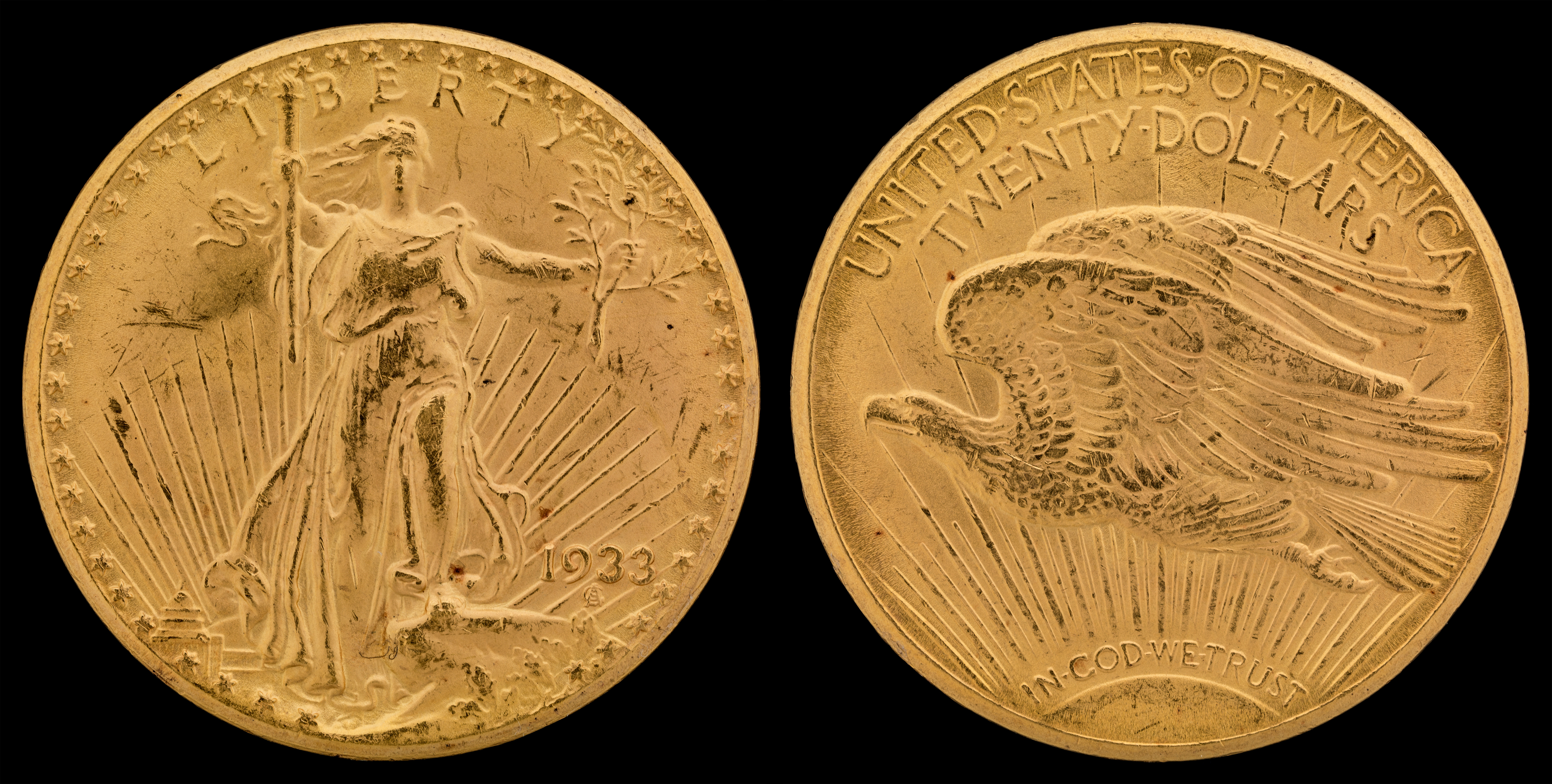
January 19, 1933: Rare U.S. "Double Eagle" issued and hastily recalled

The following events occurred in January 1933:

== January 1, 1933 (Sunday) ==
- The Soviet Union began its second Five-Year Plan with the goal of more than doubling the gross national product, from 43 billion rubles to 93 billion, by December 31, 1937.
- Capital punishment was abolished in Denmark by amendment of the 1866 Criminal Code. After the passage of the Code, 70 convicted criminals received death sentences, but only four were actually executed.
- Juan Bautista Sacasa was sworn in as President of Nicaragua, bringing an end to the American occupation there. General Mathews, the U.S. commander of the Nicaraguan National Guard, turned over his authority to Nicaraguan General Anastasio Somoza García, and President Sacasa began immediate negotiations to end the war with the Sandinista rebels.
- Archaeologists and fortune hunters Jerry van Graan and Ernst van Graan began excavations of the ancestral graveyard of the Kings of Mapungubwe in South Africa, undisturbed since the 13th Century, after being tipped off by a local resident.

== January 2, 1933 (Monday) ==
- After a seven-year occupation of Nicaragua, the last 910 U.S. Marines and sailors withdrew, departing from the port of Corinto. American forces sustained 47 killed in combat, and 66 wounded during the campaign. Two days earlier, 8 Marines had been killed in an ambush.
- Franklin D. Roosevelt completed his term as the 44th Governor of New York, two months before he would take office as the 32nd President of the United States on March 4. Herbert H. Lehman became the new Governor.
- The USC Trojans (9-0-0) and the Pittsburgh Panthers (8-0-2), both unbeaten during the 1932 college football season, met in the Rose Bowl Game in Pasadena, with USC winning 35–0.
- Born:
  - Morimura Seiichi, Japanese novelist and author, in Kumagaya (d. 2023)
  - Richard Riley, U.S. Secretary of Education 1993–2001, in Greenville, South Carolina
- Died:
  - Kid Gleason, 66, former baseball manager of the Chicago White Sox during the "Black Sox scandal" of 1919
  - Belle Moskowitz, 55, political adviser to American politician Al Smith
  - Sutton Griggs, 60, African-America poet
  - Irving O'Dunn, 34, American vaudeville actor.

== January 3, 1933 (Tuesday) ==
- Striking from the puppet state of Manchukuo, Japan launched Operation Nekka, its takeover of China's Jehol Province, attacking the port town of Shanhaiguan (through a gap in the Great Wall of China), killing hundreds of Chinese soldiers and civilians. On February 24, Japan would begin its takeover of the rest of the province with 31,000 troops, and would expand its territory.
- Ireland's Prime Minister Éamon de Valera ordered a general election to be held on January 24.
- General Douglas MacArthur, the U. S. Army Chief of Staff, issued an order requiring the U.S. Army Air Corps (forerunner of the U.S. Air Force) "to conduct the land-based air operations in defense of the United States and its overseas possessions".
- The Institute of British Geographers was created as part of the London School of Economics.
- Died:
  - Wilhelm Cuno, 56, former Chancellor of Germany from 1922 to 1923. Cuno collapsed on the doorstep of his home in Hamburg as he and his wife were preparing to leave for a vacation.
  - Jack Pickford, 36, Canadian-American actor.

== January 4, 1933 (Wednesday) ==
- After a ban against African-American enlistments that had begun on August 4, 1919, the United States Navy allowed Negroes to join, though only in the steward's department, in food service and as servants for officers. At the time, 0.5% of the enlisted men were black. The reversal was not prompted by racial enlightenment, but by concerns that the number of available Filipino domestic help would be dwindling.
- Political enemies, Nazi Party Chairman Adolf Hitler and former German Chancellor Franz von Papen, united only by their enmity with Chancellor Kurt von Schleicher, met in Cologne at the home of banker Kurt von Schröder, with the goal of forcing Schleicher from office. As a result of the negotiations, Papen would support Hitler to be named as the new Chancellor of Germany by the end of the month.
- The French Line luxury ocean liner L'Atlantique caught fire while traveling, without passengers, to Le Havre for routine maintenance. Nineteen of the crew of 225 died, and the ship was destroyed. Had the fire broken out when the ship was carrying a full load of passengers, hundreds would have died.
- Dr. V. Gregory Burtan (aka Valentine G. Burtan, aka William Gregory Burtan), a respected New York cardiologist and member of the Communist Party of the United States of America, was arrested as operator of a counterfeiting operation that had lasted more than five years. Starting in 1927, in an operation approved by Soviet dictator Joseph Stalin, tens of millions of dollars' worth of realistic-looking but bogus U.S. currency had been printed and put into circulation in the United States, Europe, and China. Burtan was sentenced to 15 years in prison but would be paroled after ten years.
- The 531 members of the electoral college, who had been selected by American voters in the presidential election on November 8, 1932, met in their respective state capitals to formally cast their ballots for Franklin Roosevelt or Herbert Hoover. The results, in favor of Roosevelt 472–59, would be made official on February 8.
- Born:
  - Phyllis Reynolds Naylor, American children's author best known for Shiloh, in Anderson, Indiana
  - René Guajardo, Mexican professional wrestler and lucha libre; in Villa Mainero, Tamaulipas state (d. 1992).
- Died: Charles H. Jones, 77, American industrialist, best known as founder of the Commonwealth Shoe and Leather Company, and creator of the popular "Bostonian" shoe; in Weston, Massachusetts.

== January 5, 1933 (Thursday) ==
- The Soviet Union began requiring every citizen over the age of 16 to carry an internal passport. A propiska, the official stamp on the passport issued by the NKVD, governed where a person could reside, and restricted who could live or work in designated "closed cities" (Moscow, Leningrad, Kiev, Odessa, Minsk, Kharkov, Vladivostok and Rostov-on-Don). By the end of the year, 27 million passports were issued. Another 420,000 persons who failed a background check were expelled from their homes. Distribution of the new passports began on January 20.
- Construction of the Golden Gate Bridge began, beginning with the anchorage for the tower at Marin, on the north side of the San Francisco Bay. The project was funded by a $35 million bond issue and by the Federal Works Progress Administration. Chief Engineer Joseph Strauss introduced several safety measures for the construction workers, including head, eye and skin protection, and a safety net below the bridge, which would save 19 men from death. The bridge would be opened to the public on May 27, 1937.
- Died:
  - Calvin Coolidge, 60, the 30th President of the United States, died at his home in Northampton, Massachusetts. He was the only living ex-president at the time.
  - Zinaida Volkova, 31, daughter of Leon Trotsky, in Germany.

== January 6, 1933 (Friday) ==
- Notorious American gangster Clyde Barrow killed Malcolm Davis, a Deputy Sheriff for Tarrant County, Texas, in West Dallas, after which Bonnie and Clyde attracted the attention of the American press, which would follow their crimes until they were both killed on May 23, 1934.
- The South Bend News-Times, local paper for the University of Notre Dame, published a copyrighted story that the March 31, 1931, airplane crash, that killed Notre Dame Coach Knute Rockne, had been caused by a time-bomb placed in the plane. According to the story, the intent was to kill the Reverend John Reynolds, to keep him from testifying in the Jake Lingle murder trial. Father Reynolds had given up his seat on the airplane in favor of Rockne, but had already testified at the trial of Leo Brothers four days earlier. The investigation of the crash, however, concluded that it was an accident caused by either turbulence or the buildup of ice on the wings.
- The drama film The Bitter Tea of General Yen, directed by Frank Capra and starring Barbara Stanwyck, became the first film to play at Radio City Music Hall in New York City.
- Born:
  - Oleg G. Makarov, Soviet cosmonaut on five Soyuz missions between 1973 and 1980, in Udomlya, RSFSR (d. 2003)
  - Emil Steinberger, Swiss comedian, director, and writer, in Lucerne.
- Died: Vladimir de Pachmann, 84, renowned Russian pianist.

== January 7, 1933 (Saturday) ==
- Soviet dictator Joseph Stalin addressed the Central Committee of the Soviet Communist Party on the results of his first Five-Year Plan, reporting that Soviet industrial output had tripled (219% increase) while production in other countries dropped, as proof that the Soviet system was superior to capitalism.
- The radio show WWVA Jamboree, the second-oldest country music radio show in the United States (after Grand Ole Opry) made its initial broadcast from the WWVA radio station in Wheeling, West Virginia.

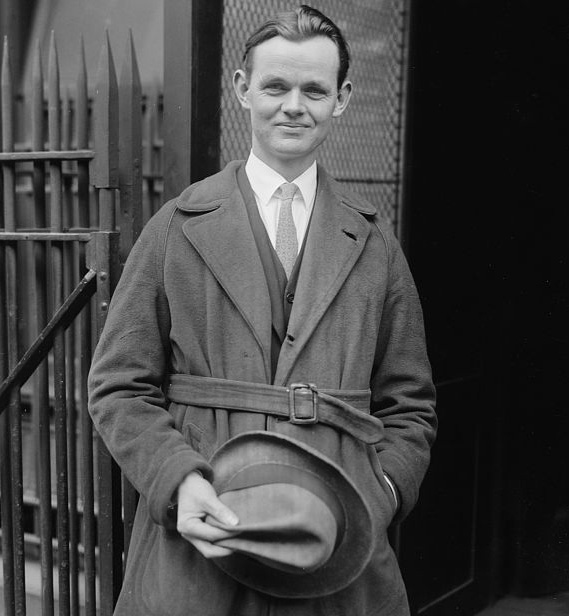
Tibbett without makeup

- An opera based on The Emperor Jones, Eugene O'Neill's 1920 play and composed by Louis Gruenberg, premiered at the Metropolitan Opera House in New York City, with baritone Lawrence Tibbett in the title role of a black escaped convict turned ruler. Tibbett, who was white, appeared in blackface, but several other cast members were African-Americans.
- Born: Anthony A. Martino, American entrepreneur who founded AAMCO Transmissions and the MAACO painting and collision repair franchises; in Philadelphia (d. 2008).
- Died: Bert Hinkler, 40, Australian aviator, after taking off from Hanworth, London, in an attempt to fly around the world. Hinkler's body and the wreckage of his airplane would be found on April 27 in the Apennine Mountains in Italy.

== January 8, 1933 (Sunday) ==
- U.S. Representative Samuel A. Kendall of Pennsylvania committed suicide in his office at the U.S. Capitol.
- Anarchists mounted an uprising in Catalonia and other regions of Spain, with attacks against police and military installations in Barcelona, Valencia, and Lleida, where 21 people were killed, and in Sevilla, Zaragoza, Málaga and Xixón. The Spanish government declared martial law on 9 January.
- Born: Charles Osgood, American journalist and commentator (CBS Sunday Morning); in New York City. (d. 2024)
- Died: Benton McMillin, 87, former U.S. Congressman (1879–99), Governor of Tennessee (1899–1903), Ambassador to Peru (1913–19), and Ambassador to Guatemala (1920–21).

== January 9, 1933 (Monday) ==
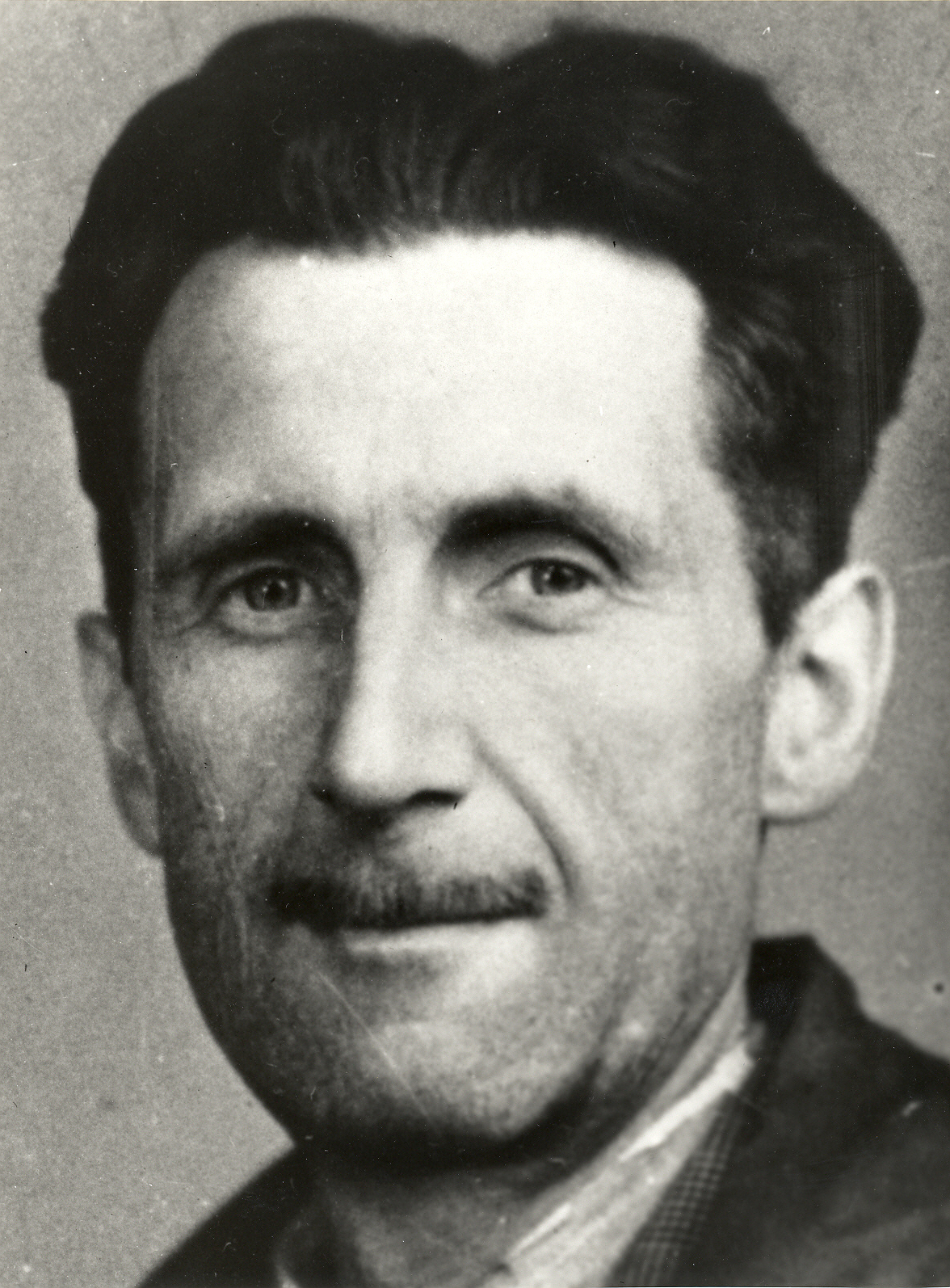
Eric Blair/George Orwell

- Using for the first time his pen name George Orwell, British author Eric Blair published his book, Down and Out in Paris and London. Blair's three other choices for pen names had been P.S. Burton, Kenneth Miles and H. Lewis Allways.
- U.S. President-Elect Roosevelt hosted Henry L. Stimson, President Hoover's Secretary of State, at Hyde Park, and found that the two agreed on foreign policy. Stimson became Roosevelt's Secretary of War in 1940.
- Born:
  - Wilbur Smith, bestselling South African novelist, in Broken Hill, Northern Rhodesia (now Kabwe, Zambia) (d. 2021)
  - Robert Garcia, controversial U.S. Congressman (D-N.Y., 1978–1990), in the Bronx (d. 2017)
- Died: Kate Gleason, 67, American engineer, inventor and entrepreneur.

== January 10, 1933 (Tuesday) ==
- In Friedrichshain, 400 Nazis attempted to force their way into a hall where 2,000 communists were holding a political rally. A street fight broke out resulting in many injuries.
- Born:
  - Gurdial Singh, Indian novelist who writes in the Punjabi language; in Faridkot (d. 2016)
  - Anton Rodgers, English character actor, in Wisbech, Cambridgeshire (d. 2007)
- Died:
  - Roberto Mantovani, 78, Italian geologist
  - Sergey Platonov, 62, Russian historian

== January 11, 1933 (Wednesday) ==
- Japanese troops captured Jiumenkou, site of the "pass of nine gates" that blocked entry into the Jehol Province, after fighting and capturing Shanhaiguan, as Japan sought to expand its territory in China.
- Sir Charles Kingsford Smith made the first commercial flight between Australia and New Zealand, taking the Southern Cross, and four passengers, 1,200 miles from Sydney to New Plymouth.
- Born: Leonard Skinner, American high school teacher whose name was the inspiration for the Southern rock band Lynyrd Skynyrd; in Jacksonville, Florida (d. 2010)

== January 12, 1933 (Thursday) ==
- After anarchists had taken control of the town of Casas Viejas the day before, the Spanish Army retaliated with the massacre of 22 civilians. When the extent of the carnage became public knowledge during the summer, Prime Minister Manuel Azaña Díaz was forced from office. Spanish Army General Francisco Franco later used the incident in gaining support for his rebels during the Spanish Civil War.
- The CPSU Central Committee passed a resolution for a massive purge of the Soviet Communist Party, with 800,000 expelled during the year, and 340,000 more in 1934.
- The last will and testament of former President Coolidge, true to his laconic reputation, was revealed to contain only 24 words: "Not unmindful of my son, John, I give all my estate, both real and personal, to my wife, Grace Goodhue Coolidge, in fee simple."
- Romanian Prime Minister Iuliu Maniu and his entire cabinet resigned after a disagreement with King Carol II.
- Greek Prime Minister Panagis Tsaldaris and his cabinet resigned after word was received that the opposition parties had withdrawn their confidence. A vote of no-confidence followed the next day, and Eleutherios Venizelos formed a new cabinet on January 16.

== January 13, 1933 (Friday) ==
- The Ilyushin Design Bureau, the Russian aircraft manufacturing company, was established in the Soviet Union by order of P.I. Baranov, at the time the People's Commissar of the Heavy Industry, and Director of the Soviet Department of the Aviation Industry and would be named for aircraft designer Sergey Ilyushin. After the demise of the Soviet Union, the company was acquired by the privately owned United Aircraft Corporation of Russia.
- The U.S. House of Representatives voted 274-94 to override President Hoover's veto of the Philippine independence bill, two hours after the veto message was received.
- Born: Princess Marie-Louise of Bulgaria, first child and daughter of King Boris III and Queen Giovanna, in Sofia.

== January 14, 1933 (Saturday) ==
- On the second day of the third test at Adelaide Bill Woodfull was struck on the chest by a ball from Harold Larwood of England, using the "bodyline" tactic.
- Born: Stan Brakhage, American filmmaker, in Kansas City, Missouri (d. 2003)

== January 15, 1933 (Sunday) ==
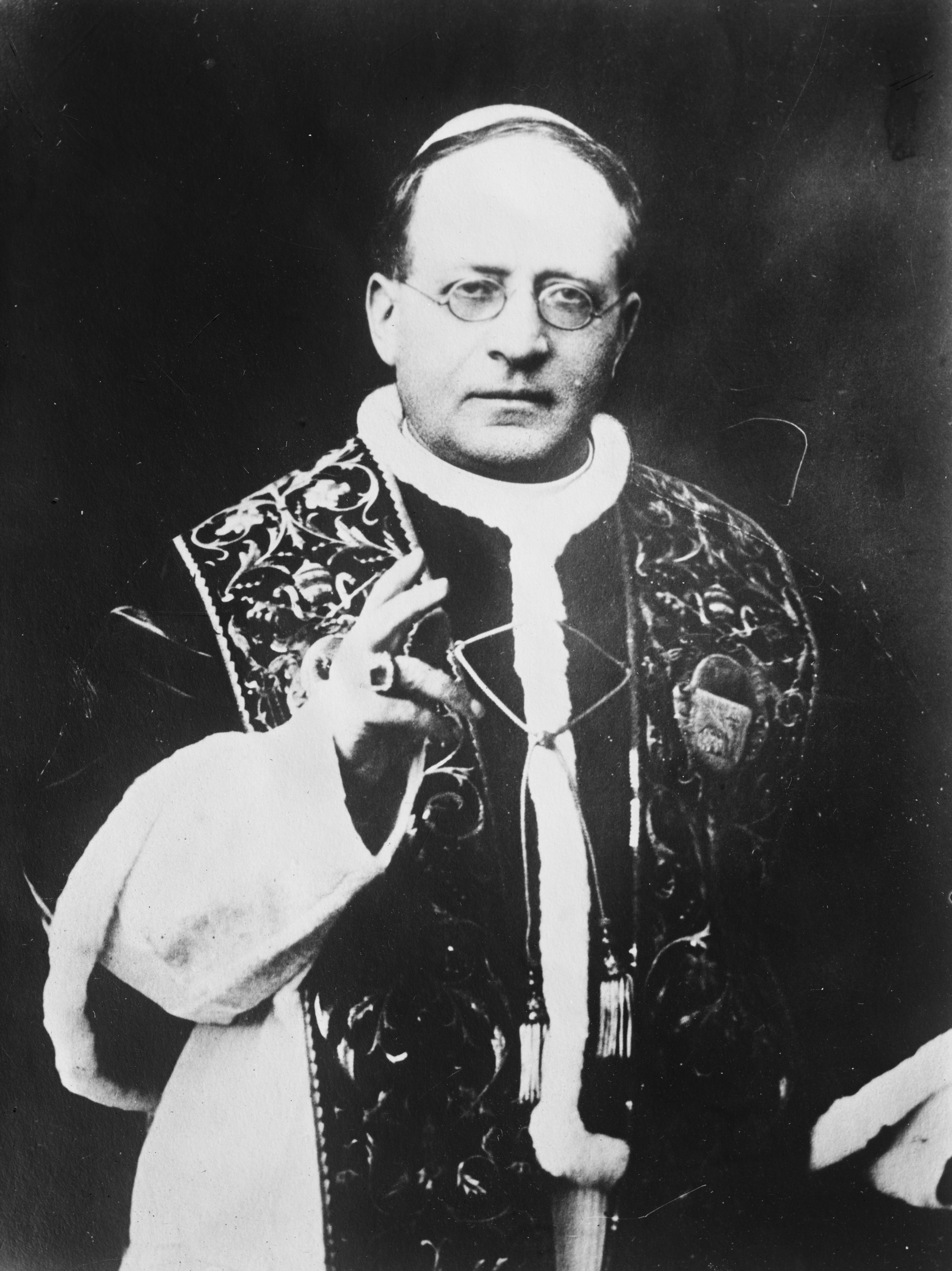
Pope Pius XI

- Pope Pius XI declared 1933 to be a Holy Year, in recognition of the 1,900th anniversary of the crucifixion of Jesus Christ, with the issuance of a bull entitled Quod Nuper ("Since recently..").
- The success of the Nazi Party in elections in the German Free State of Lippe demonstrated the stability of the Nazis and gave impetus to support for Adolf Hitler to become Chancellor.
- The Marian apparition referred to as Our Lady of Banneux was first observed in the village of Banneux in Belgium. Teenager Mariette Besco reported seeing the Virgin Mary seven more times, with the final occurrence on March 2.
- Born: Ernest J. Gaines, American poet, in Oscar, Louisiana. (d. 2019)
- Died: Jessie Woodrow Wilson Sayre, 45, daughter of former U.S. President Woodrow Wilson and women's rights leader.

== January 16, 1933 (Monday) ==
- In his campaign to disperse the kulaks, independent farmers who were resisting the Soviet campaign for collective farming, Joseph Stalin ordered the eviction of hundreds of kulak families from the countryside around Odessa and Chernigov. This was followed by orders to deport the kulaks from Dnepropetrovsk, Kharkov, Bashkiria, Lower Volga, and 30,000 from the Northern Caucasus. Eventually, more than one million resisters were resettled in Siberia.
- The Buy American Act passed the U.S. House of Representatives as an amendment to the 1934 Treasury and Post Office appropriations bill. It would pass the Senate on February 4 and be signed into law by President Herbert Hoover on his last full day in office.
- On the third day of the third test at Adelaide (15 January being a rest day) Harold Larwood of England, using his controversial "bodyline" bowling, struck Bert Oldfield on the head when the ball glanced off Oldfield's bat.
- Born: Susan Sontag, American author, as Susan Rosenblatt in New York City (d. 2004).
- Died: Lee Cruce, 70, the second Governor of Oklahoma (1911–1915).

== January 17, 1933 (Tuesday) ==
- Following the example of the U.S. House of Representatives on January 13, the United States Senate voted 66-26 to override President Hoover's veto of the Hare–Hawes–Cutting Act, passing it into law by a margin of 5 votes. The new law provided for the Philippines to become a self-governing Commonwealth, with full independence in ten years.
- Outgoing U.S. President Herbert Hoover asked Congress to pass a national sales tax upon all items except food and "cheap clothing", in order to balance the budget and offset a projected deficit of $700 million.
- Imre Nagy, the future Prime Minister of Hungary who would attempt to free his nation from Soviet domination, was first recruited by the Soviet NKVD as an informer, under the code name "Volodya".
- Miriam "Ma" Ferguson, who received her nickname from her initials as Miriam Amanda Ferguson, took office as the first woman Governor of Texas. The next day, she fired all 44 of the Texas Rangers.
- Born:
  - Prince Sadruddin Aga Khan, Iranian diplomat and United Nations High Commissioner for Refugees 1966-1978; in Paris, France (d. 2003)
  - Shari Lewis, American ventriloquist (d. 1998)
  - Dalida, Egyptian-born French singer (birth name Iolanda Cristina Gigliotti), in Cairo (d. 1987).
- Died:
  - Louis Comfort Tiffany, 84, American stained-glass artist and jewelry designer
  - Ormond Stone, 86, American astronomer.

== January 18, 1933 (Wednesday) ==
- Angelo Herndon, a 19-year-old African-American and Communist Party member, was convicted of an attempt to incite an insurrection, and sentenced by a state court in Atlanta to 18 years imprisonment. In 1937, the United States Supreme Court declared the Georgia law, which made membership of the Communist Party and solicitation for membership illegal, to be an unconstitutional infringement of the right to free speech, and reversed Herndon's conviction. Herndon's case attracted black membership of the CPUSA.
- Murray Garsson, at that time a special investigator for the U.S. Department of Labor, announced that he would seek the deportation of foreign film stars who had been staying in the United States illegally, beginning on January 23. Among the most prominent foreign stars at the time were Greta Garbo, Marlene Dietrich, Maurice Chevalier, and Maureen O'Sullivan. Fifteen actors who failed to produce their papers were asked to leave the country until they could obtain entrance under the immigration quotas.
- The Australian Board of Control protested to the Marylebone Cricket Club, captained by Douglas Jardine and representing England, against the "bodyline bowling" used by the England team. The practice, serious enough to hurt relations between Australia and the United Kingdom, was banned by English clubs on November 23.
- Born: John Boorman, English film director (Deliverance, Excalibur and Hope and Glory); in Shepperton.

== January 19, 1933 (Thursday) ==
- The first 100 of 312,500 1933 Double Eagle $20 gold pieces were delivered by the United States Mint to the U.S. Treasurer. Because the coins were never put into circulation, and nearly all would be melted into gold bricks, they became the most rare and valuable of American coins. A single one would sell at a 2002 auction for $7,590,020.
- U.S. Senator Cordell Hull of Tennessee was first offered the position of Secretary of State by President-Elect Franklin Roosevelt. Hull considered the offer for several weeks and then accepted.
- 60 inches (1,500 mm) of snow fell on the Giant Forest in California, an American record for greatest snowfall in one calendar day. The record for 24 hours was 75.8 inches (1,930 mm) at Silver Lake in Boulder County, Colorado, during April 14–15, 1921.
- England defeated Australia by 338 runs at Adelaide before a crowd of 50,962 in the third cricket test match in the series.

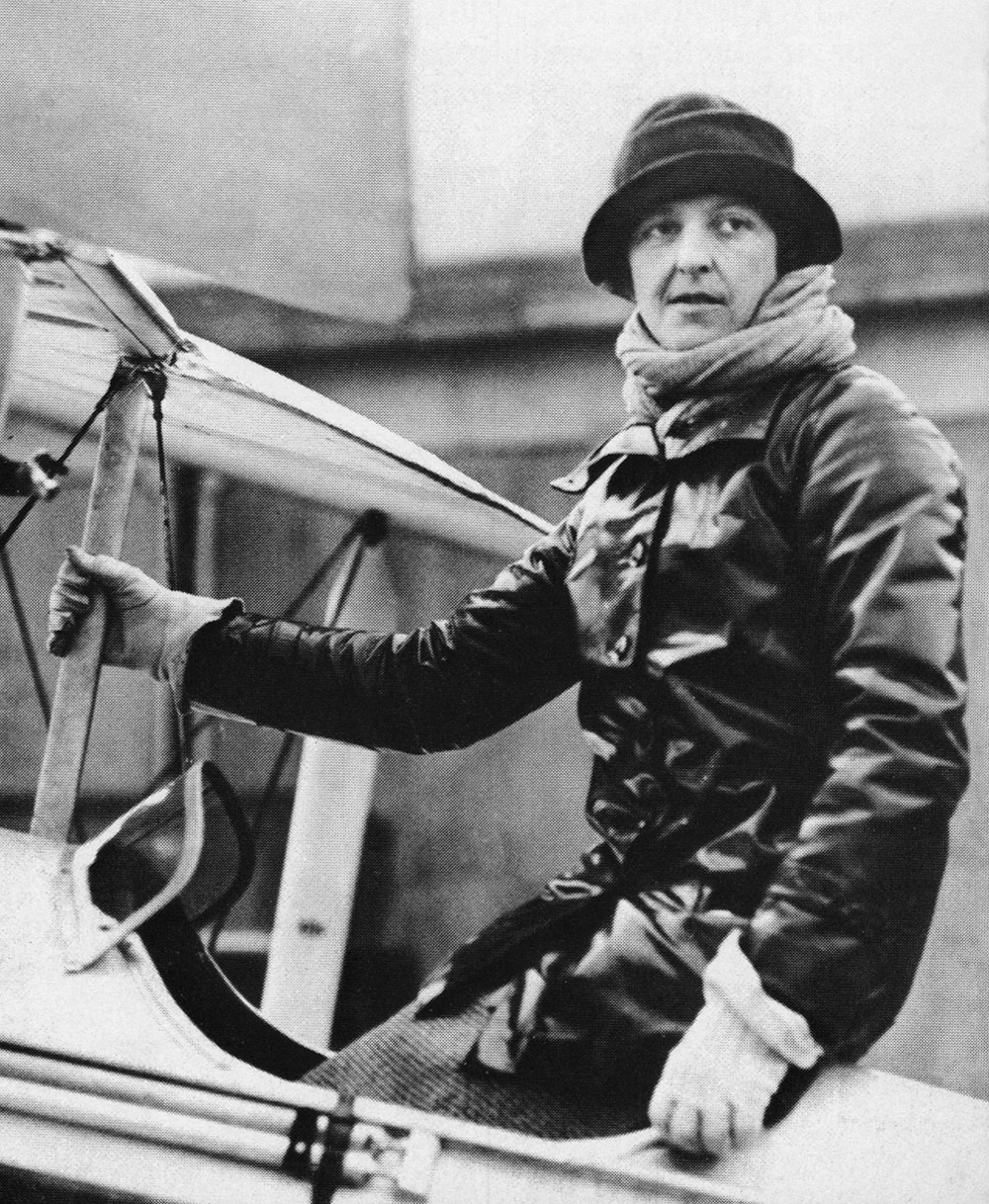
Bailey

- Mary, Lady Bailey, British aviator who had disappeared while attempting a solo flight from England to South Africa, was located and rescued after four days in the Sahara Desert. She had been forced to land 15 miles (24 km) southwest of Tahoua, Niger, French West Africa, and was dehydrated and exhausted, but uninjured.

== January 20, 1933 (Friday) ==
- In the largest battle up to that time in the Chaco War, 4,000 troops from Bolivia stormed the trenches of 10,000 Paraguayan soldiers at Nanawa.
- After the failure of the American Trust Company Bank of Davenport, the newly inaugurated Governor of Iowa declared a bank holiday, temporarily closing all of the banks in that state to prevent further withdrawals. Nevada had declared the first bank holiday on October 31, 1932, and consumer confidence had stabilized after the election of Franklin D. Roosevelt as President. The Iowa action was followed by more bank failures across the United States, and more temporary closures, with Louisiana following suit on February 3 and Michigan on February 14. By March 3, half of the 48 states had declared bank holidays, and President Roosevelt made a nationwide closure on March 6, two days after taking office. A record total of 242 American banks failed in January 1933.
- Soviet premier V. M. Molotov and Party First Secretary Joseph Stalin issued a decree replacing the prior practice of requiring peasant farmers to deliver a percentage of their grain harvest to the state, replacing it with a flat rate. Under the former rule, "the more they produced, the more the government took".
- Died: Lt. Irvin A. Woodring, last of the U.S. Army's "Three Musketeers of Aviation" for their performances at air shows, in an airplane crash. His comrades, Lt. J.J. Williams and Lt. W. L. Cornelius had both been killed in 1928.

== January 21, 1933 (Saturday) ==
- The development of what would become the Tennessee Valley Authority was endorsed by President-elect Roosevelt after he visited Muscle Shoals, Alabama, and told an audience in Montgomery, "My friends, I am determined on two things as a result of what I have seen today. The first is to put Muscle Shoals to work. The second is to make Muscle Shoals a part of an even greater development that will take in all of that magnificent Tennessee River from the mountains of Virginia down to the Ohio and the Gulf..." The result was that electricity was brought to rural areas in seven of the southeastern United States, in Alabama, Tennessee, Mississippi, Georgia, Kentucky, North Carolina, and Virginia.

== January 22, 1933 (Sunday) ==
- In response to the exodus of starving peasants from the famine in the Ukrainian SSR, Stalin and Molotov issued orders directing the national police and local authorities to "stop, by all means necessary, the large-scale departure of peasants from Ukraine and the Northern Caucasus" in that "this massive exodus of the peasants has been organized by enemies of the Soviet regime". The sale of railway tickets was halted the next day, and barricades were erected to keep peasants from leaving their district of residence.
- At a meeting at the home of Joachim von Ribbentrop, Nazi leaders conferred with three of President Hindenburg's advisers, Franz von Papen, Otto Meissner and the President's son, Oskar von Hindenburg to persuade the President to appoint Adolf Hitler as Chancellor.
- Died: Elisabeth Marbury, 77, American literary agent for Oscar Wilde and George Bernard Shaw.

== January 23, 1933 (Monday) ==
- The Twentieth Amendment to the United States Constitution was ratified after the legislature of Missouri became the 36th state to vote in favor of it. The vote in the Missouri House of Representatives came at 10:00 in the morning, when the speaker moved the opening session ahead four hours in order to vote on the amendment ahead of Massachusetts. Authored by U.S. Senator George W. Norris of Nebraska, and submitted to the states in 1932 after overwhelming approval by the Senate (63-7) and the House (336-56), the amendment changed the Presidential inauguration from March 4 to January 20. It also changed the date of inauguration Congress members, from March 4 to January 3, and changed the opening day of Congress from "the first Monday in December" to January 3 as well. Prior to the change, members who had been defeated in November elections were able to continue meeting for 13 months. Senator Norris had first proposed an amendment that the U.S. Senate had approved, 63 to 6, on February 13, 1923, that would have set the beginning of the new presidential and vice-presidential terms on "the third Monday in January following their election", and for Congress to be the first Monday in January but the legislation had not been voted on in the House.
- The boundary dispute between Guatemala and Honduras was settled after nearly 95 years, when the Special Boundary Tribunal issued an arbitration award. Prior attempts to settle the dispute had failed in 1845, 1895 and 1914, until the two nations agreed to submit the dispute on July 16, 1930.
- Born: Chita Rivera, American stage actress and dancer, 2-time Tony Award winner, winner of Presidential Medal of Freedom; (as Dolores Conchita Figueroa del Rivero), in Washington, D.C. (d. 2024)

== January 24, 1933 (Tuesday) ==
- The Central Committee of the CPSU began a purge of the Ukrainian Communist Party by Russia—the first secretaries in three of the seven oblasts were replaced by the Soviet party, with the main change being to replace Roman Terekhov as the Kharkov party boss by Pavel Postyshev. Throughout the year, 5,000 Ukrainian Party workers were replaced by outsiders.
- In parliamentary elections in the Irish Free State, Éamon de Valera's Fianna Fáil party won 77 of the 153 total seats in the Dáil Éireann, with the remainder going to Cumann na nGaedheal (48), the National Centre Party (11), independent candidates (9), and Labour (8). "With a fuller parliamentary majority" an author later wrote, "de Valera was able to abolish the Oath of Allegiance (1933), the Senate (June 1936), university representation in the Dáil (1934-36), all references to the monarch in the Constitution (December 1936, in the aftermath of the abdication of Edward VIII), and the Governor General (1937). A new Constitution was then put to referendum."

== January 25, 1933 (Wednesday) ==
- Barrandov Studios, which would become the major film studio for Czechoslovakia and later the Czech Republic, was formed in Prague.
- Born: Corazon Aquino (name at birth Maria Corazon Cojuangco), 11th President of the Philippines (1986–1992), in Paniqui, Tarlac (d. 2009).
- Died:
  - Lewis J. Selznick, 62, Russian-born American film producer
  - Alva Belmont, 80, American suffragist and philanthropist.

== January 26, 1933 (Thursday) ==
- The League of Nations Council cabled an order to the government of Peru to refrain from a planned invasion of Colombia in a dispute over the municipality of Leticia, citing Peru's duty as a League member.

== January 27, 1933 (Friday) ==
- After a walkout of 6,000 Briggs Manufacturing Company workers, who manufactured automobile bodies, the Ford Motor Company closed its American factories indefinitely, putting 100,000 people out of work, as well as 50,000 in supplying factories.

== January 28, 1933 (Saturday) ==
- Choudhary Rahmat Ali published the pamphlet "Now or Never; Are We to Live or Perish For Ever?", proposing to separate the 30,000,000 Muslim residents of British India from the Hindus and coined the name for the future nation—Pakistan—albeit as "Pakstan" from "the five Northern units of India" (Punjab, Afghan Province, Kashmir, Sind and Baluchistan)". "Pak" and "stan" were also the Persian language words for "pure" and "land".
- Kurt von Schleicher resigned as Chancellor of Germany, after President Hindenburg refused to grant him dictatorial powers to manage the nation's economic crisis and after being unable to form a coalition government. Hindenburg attempted to persuade Franz von Papen to succeed Schleicher, but Papen declined, leaving Adolf Hitler as Hindenburg's choice.
- In a vote of no confidence, the French Chamber of Deputies voted 390–193 against the government of Premier Joseph Paul-Boncour, who then resigned.

== January 29, 1933 (Sunday) ==
- Édouard Daladier was asked by President LeBrun of France to become the new Prime Minister and to form a new government. Daladier, who had been the French Minister of War, accepted and formed a new cabinet of ministers.
- Died:
  - Thomas Coward, 66, English ornithologist
  - Sara Teasdale, 48, American lyrical poet.

== January 30, 1933 (Monday) ==
- Adolf Hitler was sworn in by German President Paul von Hindenburg as Chancellor of Germany.
- The Lone Ranger made a debut, originally as a radio program on station WXYZ in Detroit. Writer Fran Striker and station owner George Trendle created the adventure of the masked man who brought justice to the American West. The program, heard on a clear channel station, would be picked up nationwide by the Mutual Broadcasting System and was notable for its use of the William Tell Overture as its theme music, and its catch phrases "Hi-yo, Silver!" and "Who was that masked man?"

== January 31, 1933 (Tuesday) ==
- The day after Adolf Hitler and his coalition partners formed the new ministry, the Reichstag was dissolved and new elections were called for March 5.
- Died: John Galsworthy, 65, English novelist and playwright, famous for The Forsyte Saga; a month after receiving the 1932 Nobel Prize in Literature.
