= Marine City =

Marine City may refer to:

- Marine City, Michigan, United States
  - Marine City Airport
- Marine City, Busan, South Korea

== See also ==
- Marin City, California, United States
- Marina City, in Chicago, Illinois, United States
