= Cottman =

Cottman may refer to:

- Joseph Stewart Cottman (1803–1863), American politician
- Cottman Transmission, American company
- Cottman's Star, fictional red giant
