= Saint Clair High School =

Saint Clair High School may refer to:

- St. Clair High School (Missouri), Saint Clair, Missouri
- St. Clair High School (Michigan), East China School District, East China Township, Michigan
- Upper St. Clair High School, Upper St. Clair Township, Pennsylvania
