= Duke's Mayo Bowl =

Annual college football bowl game played in Charlotte, NC

Duke’s Mayo Bowl
- Stadium: Bank of America Stadium
- Location: Charlotte, North Carolina
- Operated: 2002–present
- Conference tie-ins: ACC; Big Ten (even number years); SEC (odd number years)
- Previous conference tie-ins: AAC
- Payout: US$4,780,461 (2019)
- Website: dukesmayobowl.com

Sponsors
- Continental Tire (2002–2004); Meineke Car Care Center (2005–2010); Belk (2011–2019); Duke's Mayonnaise (2020–present)

Former names
- Queen City Bowl (2002, working title); Continental Tire Bowl (2002–2004); Meineke Car Care Bowl (2005–2010); Belk Bowl (2011–2019)

2026 matchup
- Wake Forest vs. Mississippi State (Wake Forest 43–29)

The Duke's Mayo Bowl is an annual college football bowl game that has been played at Bank of America Stadium in Charlotte, North Carolina, since 2002. Originally commissioned as the Queen City Bowl, it has undergone many name changes due to sponsorship rights. The bowl has tie-ins with the Atlantic Coast Conference (ACC), Southeastern Conference (SEC), and Big Ten Conference.

== History ==
A new college football bowl game in Charlotte, North Carolina, was established in 2002 by Raycom Sports (now a part of Gray Television). The game was certified by the NCAA as the Queen City Bowl, which became the Continental Tire Bowl (2002–2004), Meineke Car Care Bowl (2005–2010), and Belk Bowl (2011–2019) prior to its current name.

The game previously featured a matchup between the No. 5 selected Atlantic Coast Conference (ACC) team and the No. 3 selected American Athletic Conference (AAC). Originally, the bowl selected a team from the Big East Conference, until that conference's breakup in 2013.

In 2011, Charlotte-based department store chain Belk acquired the title sponsorship for a three-year period through 2013. After the initial period, Belk extended its sponsorship for six years, through 2019. As of 2014, the bowl featured the second pooled selection from the ACC paired against the second pooled selection from the Southeastern Conference (SEC), after selection of the College Football Playoff (CFP) teams.

On November 20, 2019, Belk informed bowl officials that the company would not be renewing its sponsorship after the 2019 season. In June 2020, Duke's Mayonnaise was announced as the new title sponsor for the bowl. As part of their sponsorship arrangement, in a take on the Gatorade shower, the head coach of the winning team gets a giant jar of mayonnaise dumped on his head.

In 2020, the ACC's opponent in the bowl is scheduled to begin alternating between the Big Ten Conference and SEC through 2025, with a Big Ten team playing in even-numbered years and an SEC team playing in odd-numbered years. The conference not sending a team to this bowl will send a team to the Las Vegas Bowl.

The 2020 game received notable social media coverage following the game as the quarterback of the winning team, Graham Mertz of Wisconsin, accidentally broke the glass trophy.

== Game results ==
Rankings are based on the AP poll prior to the game being played.

Date	Bowl name	Winning Team		Losing Team		Attnd.
December 28, 2002	Continental Tire Bowl	Virginia	48	No. 15 West Virginia	22	73,535
December 27, 2003	Continental Tire Bowl	Virginia	23	Pittsburgh	16	51,236
December 30, 2004	Continental Tire Bowl	No. 25 Boston College	37	North Carolina	24	73,258
December 31, 2005	Meineke Car Care Bowl	NC State	14	USF	0	57,937
December 30, 2006	Meineke Car Care Bowl	No. 23 Boston College	25	Navy	24	52,303
December 29, 2007	Meineke Car Care Bowl	Wake Forest	24	Connecticut	10	53,126
December 27, 2008	Meineke Car Care Bowl	West Virginia	31	North Carolina	30	73,712
December 26, 2009	Meineke Car Care Bowl	No. 17 Pittsburgh	19	North Carolina	17	50,389
December 31, 2010	Meineke Car Care Bowl	USF	31	Clemson	26	41,122
December 27, 2011	Belk Bowl	NC State	31	Louisville	24	58,427
December 27, 2012	Belk Bowl	Cincinnati	48	Duke	34	48,128
December 28, 2013	Belk Bowl	North Carolina	39	Cincinnati	17	45,211
December 30, 2014	Belk Bowl	No. 13 Georgia	37	No. 20 Louisville	14	45,671
December 30, 2015	Belk Bowl	Mississippi State	51	NC State	28	46,423
December 29, 2016	Belk Bowl	No. 18 Virginia Tech	35	Arkansas	24	46,902
December 29, 2017	Belk Bowl	Wake Forest	55	Texas A&M	52	32,784
December 29, 2018	Belk Bowl	Virginia	28	South Carolina	0	48,263
December 31, 2019	Belk Bowl	Kentucky	37	Virginia Tech	30	44,138
December 30, 2020	Duke's Mayo Bowl	Wisconsin	42	Wake Forest	28	1,500
December 30, 2021	Duke's Mayo Bowl	South Carolina	38	North Carolina	21	45,520
December 30, 2022	Duke's Mayo Bowl	Maryland	16	No. 25 NC State	12	37,228
December 27, 2023	Duke's Mayo Bowl	West Virginia	30	North Carolina	10	42,925
January 3, 2025	Duke's Mayo Bowl	Minnesota	24	Virginia Tech	10	31,927
January 2, 2026	Duke's Mayo Bowl	Wake Forest	43	Mississippi State	29	29,328

== MVPs ==
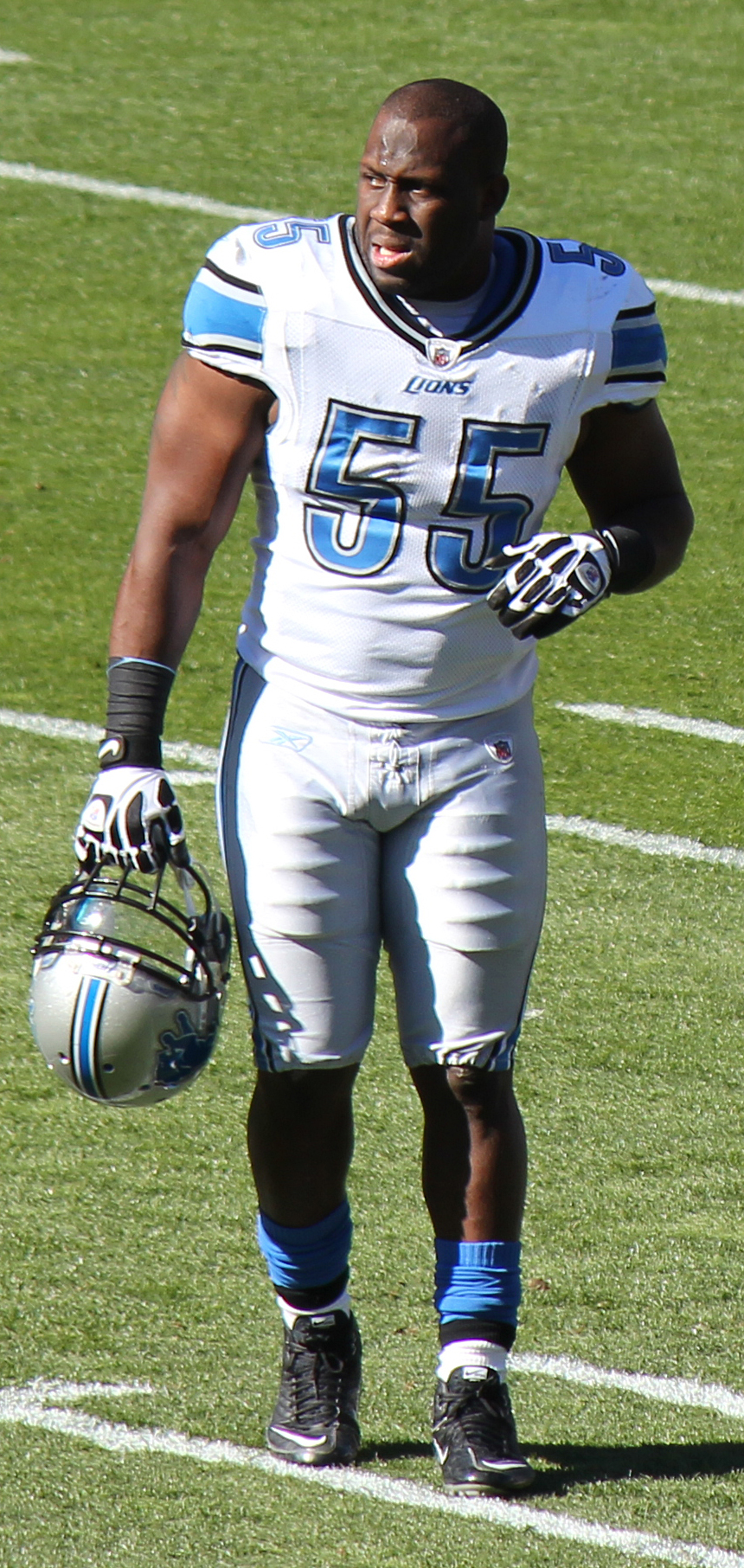
2005 MVP Stephen Tulloch

Game	MVP	School	Position
2002	Wali Lundy	Virginia	TB
2003	Matt Schaub	Virginia	QB
2004	Paul Peterson	Boston College	QB
2005	Stephen Tulloch	NC State	LB
2006	JoLonn Dunbar	Boston College	LB
2007	Kenneth Moore	Wake Forest	WR
2008	Pat White	West Virginia	QB
2009	Dion Lewis	Pittsburgh	RB
2010	B. J. Daniels	South Florida	QB
2011	Mike Glennon	NC State	QB
2012	Brendon Kay	Cincinnati	QB
2013	Ryan Switzer	North Carolina	WR
2014	Nick Chubb	Georgia	RB
2015	Dak Prescott	Mississippi State	QB
2016	Cam Phillips	Virginia Tech	WR
2017	John Wolford	Wake Forest	QB
2018	Olamide Zaccheaus	Virginia	WR
2019	Lynn Bowden	Kentucky	QB
2020	Jack Sanborn	Wisconsin	LB
2021	Dakereon Joyner	South Carolina	WR/QB
2022	Jakorian Bennett	Maryland	DB
2023	Garrett Greene	West Virginia	QB
2025	Elijah Spencer	Minnesota	WR
2026	Robby Ashford	Wake Forest	QB

== Most appearances ==
Updated through the January 2026 edition (24 games, 48 total appearances).

Teams with multiple appearances

Rank	Team	Appearances	Record
1	North Carolina	6	1–5
2	Wake Forest	4	3–1
2	NC State	4	2–2
4	Virginia	3	3–0
4	West Virginia	3	2–1
4	Virginia Tech	3	1–2
7	Boston College	2	2–0
7	Mississippi State	2	1–1
7	Cincinnati	2	1–1
7	Pittsburgh	2	1–1
7	South Florida	2	1–1
7	South Carolina	2	1–1
7	Louisville	2	0–2

Teams with a single appearance

Won (5): Georgia, Kentucky, Maryland, Minnesota, Wisconsin
Lost (6): Arkansas, Clemson, Connecticut, Duke, Navy, Texas A&M

Within the ACC's 17 football members, 10 have appeared in the game: Boston College, Clemson, Duke, Louisville, North Carolina, NC State, Pittsburgh, Virginia, Virginia Tech and Wake Forest. Members that have yet to appear include California, Florida State, Georgia Tech, Miami, SMU, Stanford and Syracuse. Both of Pittsburgh's appearances, and one appearance each by Boston College and Louisville, came while those schools were members of the Big East Conference.

Among former Big East Conference football members, Boston College, Cincinnati, Connecticut, Louisville, Pitt, South Florida, Virginia Tech and West Virginia have appeared in the game, while Miami, Rutgers, Syracuse and Temple have not. Virginia Tech's appearances came as a member of the ACC.

== Appearances by conference ==
Updated through the January 2026 edition (24 games, 48 total appearances).

Conference	Record				Appearances by season	
Conference	Games	W	L	Win pct.	Won	Lost
ACC	24	11	13	.458	2002, 2003, 2005, 2006, 2007, 2011, 2013, 2016, 2017, 2018, 2025*	2004, 2008, 2009, 2010, 2012, 2014, 2015, 2019, 2020, 2021, 2022, 2023, 2024*
American	11	5	6	.455	2004, 2008, 2009, 2010, 2012	2002, 2003, 2005, 2007, 2011, 2013
SEC	8	4	4	.500	2014, 2015, 2019, 2021	2016, 2017, 2018, 2025*
Big Ten	3	3	0	1.000	2020, 2022, 2024*	
Big 12	1	1	0	1.000	2023	
Independents	1	0	1	.000		2006

- Games marked with an asterisk (*) were played in January of the following calendar year.
- The record of the American Conference includes appearances of the Big East Conference, as the American retains the charter of the original Big East, following its 2013 realignment. Teams representing the Big East appeared in 10 games, compiling a 5–5 record.
- Independents: Navy (2006)

== Game records ==
Team	Performance, Team vs. Opponent	Year
Most points scored (one team)	55, Wake Forest vs. Texas A&M	2017
Most points scored (both teams)	107, Wake Forest vs. Texas A&M	2017
Most points scored (losing team)	52, Texas A&M vs. Wake Forest	2017
Fewest points allowed	0, shared by: NC State vs. USF; Virginia vs. South Carolina	2005; 2018
Margin of victory	28, Virginia vs. South Carolina	2018
Total yards	646, Wake Forest vs. Texas A&M	2017
Rushing yards	331, Kentucky vs. Virginia Tech	2019
Passing yards	499, Texas A&M vs. Wake Forest	2017
First downs	36, Duke vs. Cincinnati	2012
Fewest yards allowed	213, Wake Forest vs. UCONN	2007
Fewest rushing yards allowed	27, Maryland vs. NC State	2022
Fewest passing yards allowed	73, Virginia Tech vs. Kentucky	2019
Individual	Player, Team vs. Opponent	Year
All-purpose yards		
Touchdowns (all-purpose)	4, Wali Lundy (Virginia)	2002
Rushing yards	266, Nick Chubb (Georgia)	2014
Rushing touchdowns	2, most recently: Graham Mertz (Wisconsin)	2020
Passing yards	499, Nick Starkel (Texas A&M)	2017
Passing touchdowns	4, most recently: John Wolford (Wake Forest)	2017
Receiving yards	217, Hakeem Nicks (North Carolina)	2008
Receiving touchdowns	3, most recently: Jaquarii Roberson (Wake Forest)	2020
Tackles		
Sacks		
Interceptions	2, shared by: David Amerson (NC State); Dominick Sanders (Georgia)	2011; 2014
Long Plays	Player, Record, Team vs. Opponent	Year
Touchdown run	63 yds., British Brooks (North Carolina)	2021
Touchdown pass	83 yds., Travis Kelce from Brendon Kay (Cincinnati)	2012
Kickoff return	100 yds., Koredell Bartley (Wake Forest)	2026
Punt return	86 yds., Ryan Switzer (North Carolina)	2013
Interception return	72 yds., Collin Wilder (Wisconsin)	2020
Fumble return	28 yds., Jordan Wright (Kentucky)	2019
Punt	79 yds., Will Monday (Duke)	2012
Field goal	60 yds., John Love (Virginia Tech)	2025

== Media coverage ==
The bowl was televised by ESPN2 from 2002 through 2005; since 2006, the bowl has been televised by ESPN.
