= Marine City Airport =

Public use airport in Marine City, Michigan

- IATA: none; ICAO: none; FAA LID: 76G

Summary
- Owner/Operator: 76G VENTURES, LLC
- Serves: Marine City, MI
- Location: St. Clair County, MI
- Time zone: UTC−05:00 (-5)
  - Summer (DST): UTC−04:00 (-4)
- Elevation AMSL: 613 ft / 187 m
- Coordinates: 42°43′17″N 082°35′47″W
- Interactive map of Marine City Airport

Runways
Direction	Length		Surface
Direction	ft	m	Surface
4/22	3,070	936	Asphalt

Statistics (2020)
- Aircraft movement: 4004

Marine City Airport (FAA LID: 76G) is a privately owned, public use airport located 4 miles west of Marine City in St. Clair County, Michigan.

== History ==
The airport was originally owned by Willis Manter. It was sold in 2019 after his death. All airport facilities, including the hangars, fixed-bas operator, and flight school, were included in the sale.

== Facilities and aircraft ==
The airport has one runway, designated as runway 4/22. It measures 3070 x 60 ft (936 x 18 m) and is paved with asphalt. For the 12-month period ending December 31, 2020, the aircraft averages 4,004 aircraft operations per year, or 77 per week, all general aviation. Based on the same time period, there are 23 aircraft based at the airport, all airplanes: 20 single-engine and 3 multi-engine.

The airport has a fixed-base operator that offers fuel and amenities such as a conference room, a pilot's lounge, snooze rooms, showers, courtesy transportation, and more. It also offers flight training and general aircraft maintenance.

The airport has three hangar buildings, which host 32 tenants, most of whom are pilots. There is also a horse barn on airport property.

== Accidents and incidents ==
- On July 31, 1999, a Beechcraft King Air 200 crashed while flying a skydiving mission at the Marine City Airport. The pilot and nine passengers on board were killed. All aboard were part of the Parahawks, a skydiving club based at the airport, who were on a 3-day camping trip at the airport.
- On January 18, 2004, a Piper PA-46 impacted a snow bank while landing at the Marine City Airport. After the second landing, the aircraft began "pulling to the left," and the pilot unsuccessfully attempted to correct with right rudder. The aircraft subsequently impacted the four-foot high snow bank positioned alongside the runway. The probable cause of the accident was found to be the pilot's failure to maintain directional control of the airplane during landing. Factors associated with the accident were the icy, snow-covered runway; tailwind conditions; the snowbank; and the ditch which the airplane contacted after impacting the snowbank.
- On July 19, 2006, a Luscombe 8A impacted terrain after an engine failure on departure from Marine City Airport. Though the runup was normal, the pilot said the engine stopped and restarted while the aircraft was on the takeoff roll, and it happened again when the aircraft was too far down the runway to abort the landing. The pilot attempted to fly and stayed low to avoid power lines off the end of the runway. When the aircraft reached treetop height, the pilot banked to line the aircraft up with a nearby field for a landing. During the bank, the aircraft stalled and impacted the ground. The loss of engine power was found to be due to a partially-blocked carburetor fuel screen, resulting in fuel starvation; the crash was caused by the pilot's failure to maintain adequate airspeed during the forced landing which resulted in an inadvertent stall.
- On August 11, 2007, a Cessna 172 Skyhawk was substantially damaged during a forced landing at the Marine City Airport. A flight instructor was providing a student pilot instruction in takeoff and landing practice and reported that the student pilot was having difficulty holding runway centerline and using proper descent technique during normal approaches to landing. During the accident approach, the aircraft was low and slow, and the instructor determined a go-around was necessary when the aircraft floated halfway down the runway. Though the instructor attempted a go-around, the engine sputtered after full power and carburetor heat were applied, and the instructor subsequently performed a forced landing on the runway. The airplane departed the runway and nosed over in the soft terrain. The cause of the loss of engine power could not be determined.
- On March 21, 2014, a Cessna 172 Skyhawk was damaged during a landing attempt at the Marine City Airport. The pilot said he flared to high and bounced twice; though he did attempt to add power to go around. During the go-around attempt, the aircraft's landing gear struck a snow bank on the edge of the runway, causing the aircraft to pitch nose down and impact terrain. The probable cause of the accident was found to be the pilot's improper recovery from a bounced landing.
- On May 22, 2016, a Beech C24R Sierra was substantially damaged while landing at Marine City Airport. While departing on his flight, the pilot reported that he did not initially observe an indication that the right main landing gear had retracted properly; but before the pilot could recycle the fear, he felt a thump, and the landing gear position light disappeared, thus indicating a fully retracted landing gear. The pilot subsequently continued to his destination, but when he extended the landing gear on approach, the indicator light for the right main landing gear did not illuminate (indicating an unsafe gear position). The pilot orbited the airport and attempted to cycle the gear multiple times, but he never got a safe landing gear light, and he subsequently decided to land with the right main gear retracted. The investigation found that the right main landing gear tire had jammed itself against the aft wheel well fairing, which prevented the landing gear from extending out of the wheel well; the gear only extended after a mechanic used a crowbars to dislodge the tire from its wheel well fairing.

== See also ==
- List of airports in Michigan
