= Brendon Kay =

American football player (born 1989)

Marine City HS (MI)
- Title: Quarterbacks coach

Personal information
- Born: December 29, 1989 (age 36); Marine City, Michigan, U.S.
- Listed height: 6 ft 4 in (1.93 m)
- Listed weight: 233 lb (106 kg)

Career information
- High school: Marine City (MI)
- College: Cincinnati
- NFL draft: 2014: undrafted

Career history

Playing
- Pittsburgh Steelers (2014)*; New Orleans VooDoo (2015)*
- * Offseason or practice squad member only

Coaching
- Marine City HS (MI) (2020–2021) Assistant coach; Marine City HS (MI) (2022–present) Quarterbacks coach
- Stats at Pro Football Reference

Brendon Kay is an American former football quarterback and current assistant coach for Marine City High School. He played college football for Cincinnati. After going undrafted in the 2014 NFL draft, he had stints with the Pittsburgh Steelers of the National Football League (NFL) and the New Orleans VooDoo of the Arena Football League (AFL).

== Early life ==
Kay was born in Marine City, Michigan, and played for Marine City High School. He was a three-year captain, achieved a total record of 34–2 as a starter, won one state championship, and was invited to play in the 2008 Michigan East-West All-Star Game. Over his high school career he completed 133 of 202 passes for 2,083 yards and rushed for 561 yards and 15 touchdowns.

== College career ==
On July 9, 2007, Kay committed to the University of Cincinnati for football.

He redshirted in 2008.

Kay played in two games during 2009, throwing and completing 2 passes for 27 yards. He also had 4 rushes for 27 yards.

In 2010, Kay appeared in one game for the Bearcats, completing 3 passes on 6 attempts for 20 yards. He suffered a second knee injury and did not play again that season. He was later awarded a sixth year of eligibility.

In 2011, he appeared in 4 games, gathering 22 rushing yards on 3 attempts.

In 2012, Kay appeared in 11 games, completing 87 passes on 138 attempts, totaling 1,298 yards, 10 passing touchdowns, and 2 interceptions. He gained 308 rushing yards on 46 attempts and gathered 2 rushing touchdowns.

In 2013, Kay appeared in 13 games, completing 262 passes on 395 attempts for 3,302 yards. He gathered 22 passing touchdowns and 12 interceptions. He gained 137 rushing yards on 72 attempts and gathered 6 rushing touchdowns.

== Professional career ==
=== Pittsburgh Steelers ===
Kay was signed by the Pittsburgh Steelers as an undrafted free agent on May 13, 2014, after going undrafted in the 2014 NFL draft. He was released on August 31, 2014.

=== New Orleans VooDoo ===
In March 2015, Kay signed with the New Orleans VooDoo of the Arena Football League (AFL). In August 2015, he was released.

== Coaching career ==
Kay was hired as a coach for his former high school Marine City High School for the 2020 season, which was delayed due to COVID-19. He was also joined by former New Orleans Saints guard, Tim Lelito. For the 2022 season, Kay was named as the school's quarterback coach.
