= December 1932 =

Month of 1932

<<	December 1932					>>
Su	Mo	Tu	We	Th	Fr	Sa
				1	2	3
4	5	6	7	8	9	10
11	12	13	14	15	16	17
18	19	20	21	22	23	24
25	26	27	28	29	30	31

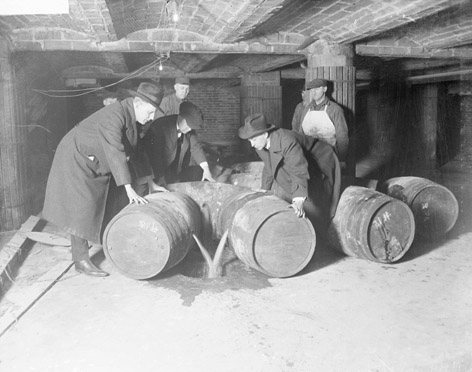
Prohibition agents destroying barrels of alcohol during the prohibition era in the United States.

The following events occurred in December 1932:

== December 1, 1932 (Thursday) ==
- The British government delivered a note to the United States seeking cancellation of all war debts, saying that resumption of the payments "would inevitably deepen the depression."
- The "Trogir incident" took place in Croatia when a group of young Yugoslav nationalists destroyed eight stone Venetian lions on old public buildings and city walls in the city of Trogir. The incident caused the already strained relations between Yugoslavia and Italy to worsen further.
- Born: Heather Begg, operatic mezzo-soprano, in Nelson, New Zealand (d. 2009)

== December 2, 1932 (Friday) ==
- President Paul von Hindenburg appointed Kurt von Schleicher to become Chancellor of Germany.
- The romance drama film A Farewell to Arms starring Helen Hayes, Gary Cooper and Adolphe Menjou premiered at the Criterion Theatre in New York City.
- Born: Sergio Bonelli, comic book author and publisher, in Italy (d. 2011)

== December 3, 1932 (Saturday) ==
- Kurt von Schleicher formed a cabinet and became Chancellor of Germany. Most of the ministers were members of Franz von Papen's previous cabinet.
- Mexico announced its intent to withdraw from the League of Nations.
- Army won the gridiron football Army–Navy Game 20-0 at Franklin Field in Philadelphia.
- The Hamilton Tigers won the 20th Grey Cup of Canadian football with a 25–6 victory over the Regina Roughriders.
- Born: Corry Brokken, singer, in Breda, Netherlands (d. 2016); Jody Reynolds, rock and roll musician, in Denver, Colorado (d. 2008)

== December 4, 1932 (Sunday) ==
- Italy announced a new plan to electrify 40% of the country's railway network within four years at a cost of 4.6 billion lire.
- Born: Roh Tae-woo, general and 6th President of South Korea, in Daegu (d. 2021)

== December 5, 1932 (Monday) ==
- A joint resolution was introduced to the U.S. Congress of a Twenty-first Amendment to the United States Constitution, repealing the Eighteenth Amendment and turning the regulation of liquor over to the individual states.
- The British government suggested issuing bonds to cover its war debts to the United States.
- The comic strip Jane by Norman Pett first appeared in the British tabloid paper the Daily Mirror.
- Born: Sheldon Glashow, theoretical physicist and Nobel laureate, in New York City; Little Richard, musician, in Macon, Georgia (d. 2020)

== December 6, 1932 (Tuesday) ==
- The Reichstag opened for its first session since November's elections. The Communists tried to introduce a motion of no confidence, but the Nazis used their plurality to have it postponed.
- Albert Einstein was granted a visa to enter the United States. An organization called the Woman's Patriot Corporation had filed a complaint claiming Einstein was inadmissible "because of his affiliations with certain organizations claimed to be connected with the Communist International", but the State Department announced that George S. Messersmith had "examined Prof. Einstein as he would any applicant and has reached the conclusion that Prof. Einstein is admissible to the United States."

== December 7, 1932 (Wednesday) ==
- 50 Nazi and Communist deputies brawled in the Reichstag lobby, smashing a huge chandelier that rained glass on the combatants and wounded six.
- Born: Paul Caponigro, photographer, in Boston, Massachusetts (d. 2024); Rosemary Rogers, historical romance novelist, in Panadura, Ceylon (d. 2019); J. B. Sumarlin, economist and finance minister, in Nglegok, East Java (d. 2020)

== December 8, 1932 (Thursday) ==
- Gregor Strasser resigned from all offices of the Nazi Party over disagreements with Hitler.
- Died: Gertrude Jekyll, 89, British horticulturalist and garden designer

== December 9, 1932 (Friday) ==
- Japanese forces in Manchukuo invaded China's Jehol Province.
- The Reichstag voted to adjourn, leaving Chancellor Schleicher free to govern the country through the coming weeks without facing the constant threat of legislative defeat.
- Born: Morton Downey, Jr., US television talk show host, in Los Angeles (d. 2001); Bill Hartack, US jockey, in Ebensburg, Pennsylvania (d. 2007)
- Died: Begum Rokeya, 52, Indian feminist writer and social worker

== December 10, 1932 (Saturday) ==
- The 1932 Nobel Prizes were awarded in Stockholm. The recipients were Werner Heisenberg of Germany for Physics, Irving Langmuir of the United States (Chemistry), Sir Charles Sherrington and Edgar Adrian of the United Kingdom (Medicine) and John Galsworthy of the United Kingdom (Literature). The Peace Prize was not awarded.
- King Prajadhipok of Siam signed the country's first constitution, making the country a constitutional monarchy instead of an absolute one. December 10 is now Constitution Day in Thailand, a national holiday.
- The Greek stock exchange opened for the first time since the height of the country's economic crisis in November 1931.
- The film Madame Butterfly starring Cary Grant and Sylvia Sidney was released.
- The Emu War ends
- Died: Eugen Bamberger, 75, German chemist

== December 11, 1932 (Sunday) ==
- The United States negotiated a No Force Declaration with Britain, France, Germany and Italy. These nations all promised not to resolve any present or future disputes amongst themselves with force.
- Born: Enrique Bermúdez, Contra leader, in León, Nicaragua (d. 1991)

== December 12, 1932 (Monday) ==
- The New York Giants, Pittsburgh Pirates and Philadelphia Phillies swung a three-team, five player baseball trade. The biggest name in the deal, future Hall of Famer Freddie Lindstrom, went from the Giants to the Pirates.

== December 13, 1932 (Tuesday) ==
- A huge anti-Yugoslavian demonstration was held in Rome protesting against the Trogir incident. Mussolini appeared on the balcony of the Palazzo Venezia and declared that such acts of vandalism "cannot and must not be forgotten."
- Born: Tatsuya Nakadai, actor, in Tokyo, Japan (d. 2025)

== December 14, 1932 (Wednesday) ==
- The French Chamber of Deputies rejected Prime Minister Édouard Herriot's payment plan of war debts to the United States, voted his government out of office and then voted to defer payment until an international debt conference could be held.
- Six died in a collision of two passenger trains in Switzerland near Lucerne.

== December 15, 1932 (Thursday) ==
- Five countries (France, Poland, Belgium, Estonia and Hungary) defaulted on their war debt payments to the United States in response to the U.S. Congress' rejection of the debt reduction plan agreed to at the Lausanne Conference.
- Died: Josip Vancaš, 75, Croatian architect

== December 16, 1932 (Friday) ==
- The Shirokiya Department Store fire broke out in Tokyo, Japan, leaving 14 dead and 67 injured. The fire was the source of a longstanding urban legend that saleswomen in kimonos refused to jump to safety because they were ashamed to be seen from below, and died as a result.
- Argentine police arrested former presidents Hipólito Yrigoyen and Marcelo T. de Alvear as the government announced it had uncovered a seditious plot to overthrow the country's leadership.
- Uruguay granted women the right to vote and stand for election.

== December 17, 1932 (Saturday) ==
- Several Italian newspapers published "A Manifesto of Italian Musicians for the Tradition of Nineteenth-Century Romantic Art" signed by several prominent Italian composers. The manifesto attacked modernistic trends in Italian music by composers such as Gian Francesco Malipiero and Alfredo Casella and advocated a return to Romantic music.
- German was admitted as an official language in South-West Africa alongside English and Afrikaans.

== December 18, 1932 (Sunday) ==
- Joseph Paul-Boncour became Prime Minister of France.
- An extra game was held to break a tie in the final season standings of the National Football League after the Chicago Bears and Portsmouth Spartans finished with identical 6-1 records. The Bears won 9-0 in a game held indoors at Chicago Stadium because of anticipated extremely cold temperatures. This is considered the first major indoor football game in history.
- Benito Mussolini presided over the inauguration of the new city of Littoria, created after the draining of the Pontine Marshes.
- Died: Eduard Bernstein, 82, German socialist politician

== December 19, 1932 (Monday) ==
- A team of Chicago police raided the headquarters of mob boss Frank Nitti. One of the Detective Sergeants shot Nitti three times and then gave himself a minor gunshot wound to make it look like self-defense. Nitti survived the shooting.
- The BBC Empire Service began broadcasting, making the BBC heard outside of Britain for the first time.
- A new high-speed train running from Berlin to Hamburg in 142 minutes, the DRG Class SVT 877 (nicknamed the "Flying Hamburger"), entered commercial service.
- The U.S. Supreme Court decided Sorrells v. United States.
- Died: Yun Bong-gil, 24, Korean independence activist (executed for April 29 bomb attack)

== December 20, 1932 (Tuesday) ==
- A 7.2 magnitude earthquake struck the Cedar Mountains region of Nevada. Although the epicenter of the earthquake was uninhabited, it was felt as far away as San Francisco and Los Angeles.
- Born: John Hillerman, American actor, in Denison, Texas (d. 2017)

== December 21, 1932 (Wednesday) ==
- The U.S. House of Representatives voted 230-165 in favor of the "Collier beer bill", legalizing 3.2% beer.
- Born: Edward Hoagland, author, in New York City (d 2026)

== December 22, 1932 (Thursday) ==
- The Japanese fascist party Kokumin Dōmei was founded.
- The Universal Horror film The Mummy starring Boris Karloff was released.
- The German film F.P.1 antwortet nicht, based on the novel of the same name by Kurt Siodmak, premiered at the Ufa-Palast am Zoo in Berlin.

== December 23, 1932 (Friday) ==
- Regular telephone service began between Hawaii and the United States.
- The film Rasputin and the Empress, starring the Barrymore siblings (John, Ethel and Lionel) premiered at the Astor Theatre in New York City.

== December 24, 1932 (Saturday) ==
- Arturo Alessandri was sworn in as President of Chile.
- President Paul von Hindenburg and Chancellor Kurt von Schleicher made a special Christmas appeal to aid the 500,000 unemployed youths of Germany.
- The Moweaqua Coal Mine disaster killed 54 miners in Moweaqua, Illinois.
- 16-year-old W. D. Jones persuades Clyde Barrow to let him join Barrow and Bonnie Parker, and get out of Dallas that night.
- Born: Earl Dodge, Prohibitionist, in Revere, Massachusetts (d. 2007)

== December 25, 1932 (Sunday) ==
- 18 men imprisoned for participating in the August 10 revolt in Spain were set free.
- The tradition of the Royal Christmas Message began with a radio broadcast by King George V on the new BBC Empire Service.

== December 26, 1932 (Monday) ==
- In the Chaco War, Bolivians launched a failed counterattack in the Battle of Kilometer 7.

== December 27, 1932 (Tuesday) ==
- Radio City Music Hall opened in New York City.
- South Africa forbade all export of gold.
- Greek court refused to extradite fugitive business executive Samuel Insull to the United States and freed him from prison, ruling that there was no evidence in the embezzlement and larceny charges he faced in America.

== December 28, 1932 (Wednesday) ==
- The Soviet Union announced that starting in January, all inhabitants over 16 years of age must carry passports and register with police whenever they move from one locality to another.
- Walter Lowenfels' plagiarism suit against the authors, publishers and producers of the George Gershwin musical Of Thee I Sing was dismissed.
- The Edward H. Griffith-directed comedy-drama film The Animal Kingdom was released.
- Born: Dhirubhai Ambani, businessman, in Bombay, British India (d. 2002); Dorsey Burnette, rockabilly singer, in Memphis, Tennessee (d. 1979); Roy Hattersley, writer and politician, in Sheffield, England (d. 2026); Harry Howell, ice hockey player, in Hamilton, Ontario, Canada (d. 2019); Nichelle Nichols, actress and singer, in Robbins, Illinois (d. 2022); Manuel Puig, author, in General Villegas, Argentina (d. 1990)
- Died: Malcolm Whitman, 55, American tennis player

== December 29, 1932 (Thursday) ==
- France and Australia signed an agreement in Paris providing for preferential tariffs in mutual trade.
- The RKO Roxy Theatre opened in Rockefeller Center in New York City.
- Born: Inga Swenson, actress, in Omaha, Nebraska (d. 2023)

== December 30, 1932 (Friday) ==
- Police in Romania arrested 800 members of the Communist Party for subversive activities.
- The All India Institute of Hygiene and Public Health was inaugurated.
- Born: Paolo Villaggio, actor, writer, director and comedian, in Genoa, Italy (d. 2017)

== December 31, 1932 (Saturday) ==
- The first five-year plan ended in the Soviet Union.
- Died: Stanisław Narutowicz, 70, Polish-Lithuanian lawyer and politician
