= Cottman Transmission and Total Auto Care =

American auto repair franchise and company

- Formerly: Cottman Transmission
- Type: Private
- Industry: Auto maintenance
- Founded: 1962
- Founder: Richard Silva
- Headquarters: 201 Gibraltar Road, Horsham, PA, United States
- Number of locations: 52
- Area served: North America
- Key people: Randy Wright, President; Derik Beck, Vice President of Digital Marketing
- Services: Transmissions, auto care
- Owner: American Capital
- Parent: American Driveline Systems, Inc.
- Website: www.cottman.com

Cottman Transmission and Total Auto Care is an American transmission-repair franchise and company-owned automotive service centers headquartered in Horsham, Pennsylvania. As of 2020 there are 52 locations in 23 states in the United States and Canada. The company is owned by American Capital and American Driveline Systems, Inc. is the parent company. Cottman was founded by Richard Silva in 1962.

== History ==
In 1957, Anthony A. Martino founded an automatic transmission repair shop in Philadelphia. Soon after opening the shop, he partnered with two friends, Richard Silva and Walter DeLutz to expand operations. Together, they opened numerous transmission centers in and around Philadelphia. In 1962, the men divided their stores with Silva's center becoming the first Cottman Transmission Center which was named after Cottman Avenue in Northeast Philadelphia.

In 1964, Silva sold his first franchise to an entrepreneur who opened a center on Roosevelt Boulevard. From there, the chain grew locally. As the 1960s and 1970s progressed, the chain expanded along the East Coast and throughout the Gulf Coast states, reaching 81 shops in 1977. In 1979, Silva retired and sold the company to three of his employees - Michael Ambrose, Edward Kelly and James Corkran. The company expanded to a few hundred locations throughout the United States and Canada and became the nation's second-largest chain of transmission repair shops.

In April 2004, American Capital invested $46 million in the acquisition of Cottman Transmission and purchased the company for $77.3 million including the investment. In 2006, its parent holding company, American Driveline Systems, Inc. acquired AAMCO Transmissions as part of their portfolio and it was combined with the company. Now It operates totally separated under the same owner and parent holding company.

Cottman Transmission and Total Auto Care celebrated its 50th anniversary of business in 2012.

== Services ==
Cottman Transmission and Total Auto Care specializes in every phase of automotive repair and maintenance including a specialization in servicing both automatic and manual transmissions.

== In popular culture ==
Former American footballer Terry Bradshaw was the spokesperson for the company from 2005 to 2008.
