= East China School District =

School district in Michigan

Address
- 1585 Meisner Road East China, St. Clair, Michigan, 48054; United States

District information
- Type: Public school district
- Grades: PreK–12
- Superintendent: Suzanne Cybulla
- Schools: 9
- Budget: $81,503,000 2022-2023 expenditures
- NCES District ID: 2612420

Students and staff
- Students: 3,433 (2024-2025)
- Teachers: 213.84 (FTE) 2024-2025
- Staff: 524.92 (FTE) 2024-2025
- Student–teacher ratio: 16.05 2024-2025

Other information
- Website: eastchinaschools.org

East China School District is a school district in East China Township, Michigan, United States. The district covers the towns of St. Clair and Marine City and the township of China, and parts of Cottrellville, Columbus, and Ira townships.

== History ==
St. Clair's first schoolhouse was built in 1858 at Third and Mulberry Streets.

A red brick schoolhouse, at 696 Meisner Road, was built in 1859. It was used for schooling until East China Elementary was built in 1954. The schoolhouse is now a museum.

According to newspapers, there was a high school in Marine City as early as 1889. A new high school was built in Marine City in 1900.

The present Marine City High School opened in fall of 1961. The architect was Smith and Smith Associates of Royal Oak. A cafeteria and junior high wing were built in 1974. The school was once known as Marine City Ward-Cottrell High School, but that name stopped appearing in the school's yearbook in 1997.

St. Clair had a "high school room" in its school building as of 1874. That building, built in 1860, was torn down and replaced by a new high school in 1922. It became a junior high when the present high school opened. The previous junior high is now Saint Clair River Elementary, as of 2025.

In 1961, the St. Clair school district consolidated with East China School District. The present St. Clair High School opened in November, 1961. The architect was Wakely-Kushner and Associates.

== Schools ==
Schools in East China School District
School	Address	Notes
Belle River Elementary School	1601 Chartier Road, Marine City	Grades K-5
Marine City Middle School	6373 King Road, Marine City	Grades 6-8
Marine City High School	1085 Ward Street, Marine City	Grades 9-12
Palms Elementary School	6101 Palms Road, Fair Haven	Grades K-5
Pine River Elementary School	3575 King Road, China Township	Grades K-4
St. Clair River Elementary	4335 Yankee Road, St. Clair	Grades K-5 Built in 2000 by SGB / Kingscott Architects.
St. Clair Campus	2200 Clinton Avenue, St. Clair	Grades 6-12
Other district facilities
Early Childhood Center	1585 Meisner Road, East China Township	Opened fall 2022 on the site of the district administration building.
Innovation Center	1585 Meisner Road, East China Township	Opened 2023 on the site of the district administration building.
Performing Arts Center	1585 Meisner Road, East China Township	636-seat district performing arts center, opened 2004.
