= AAMCO Transmissions =

American franchisor of auto transmission repair shops

AAMCO Transmissions Inc.
- Trade name: AAMCO Transmissions and Total Car Care
- Company type: Private
- Industry: Auto maintenance Franchising
- Founded: 1957; 69 years ago (as AAMCO Auto and Truck Repair)
- Founders: Robert Morgan; Anthony A. Martino
- Headquarters: Horsham, Pennsylvania, United States
- Number of locations: 527
- Area served: North America
- Key people: Bruce Chidsey (president)
- Products: Transmissions, car care
- Revenue: $450 million
- Parent: American Driveline Systems, Inc.
- Website: www.aamco.com

AAMCO Transmissions Inc. is an American transmission-repair franchise founded by Robert Morgan and Anthony A. Martino (who used the first letter of each name to form the names AAMCO and later MAACO) in 1957 in Philadelphia. Martino eventually ended his affiliation with AAMCO to manage the MAACO autobody-shop franchise, but Morgan stayed on with his son, Keith Morgan, succeeding him as CEO.

In 2006, the company was acquired by American Capital. In January 2017, American Driveline Systems, the franchiser of the AAMCO and Cottman Transmission and Total Auto Care brands, was acquired by Transom Capital Group. In October of the same year, Icahn Enterprises L.P. (NASDAQ: IEP) announced it had acquired American Driveline Systems through a wholly owned subsidiary. Aamco has consistently ranked on the Entrepreneurs Franchise 500

== History ==
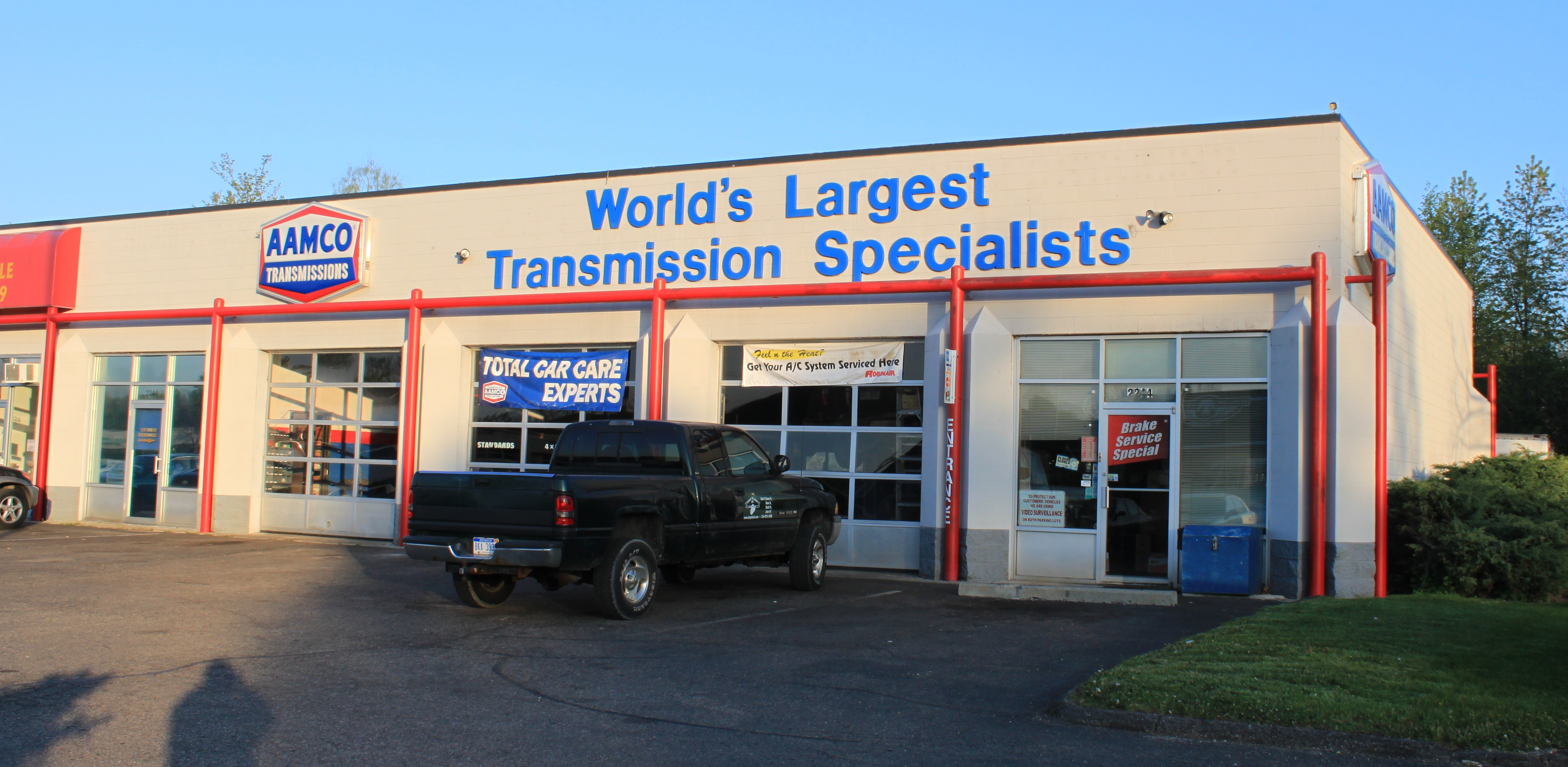
AAMCO shop, Ypsilanti, MI

Anthony A. Martino started repairing automatic transmissions from leased space in an Esso shop in Philadelphia. In 1957, he founded the Anthony A. Martino Company, or AAMCO in Philadelphia, under the name AAMCO Auto and Truck Repair. This name was chosen not only to reflect the initials of the founder, but also to make it appear higher in the Yellow pages listings of the day. Along with partners Richard Silva and Walter D'lutz', Martino opened several other shops in the Philadelphia area. Owing to the complexity and failure rate of automatic transmissions of the day, Martino quickly decided to drop the "Auto and Truck Repair", and focus solely on transmissions, where the company would stay focused until 2007.

In 1962, Robert Morgan approached Martino with the concept of a national chain of transmission repair stores branded as AAMCO. Martino was receptive to the idea, and the shops operated in cooperation with Silva and DeLutz were rebranded as AAMCO. The first franchise was not sold until 1963, when an AAMCO shop was opened by Ivan and Jack Ginninger in Newark, New Jersey.

In March 2006, AAMCO merged with Cottman Transmission, and American Capital purchased AAMCO and moved the headquarters from Philadelphia to nearby Horsham, Pennsylvania.

Owing in part to the increased reliability of automatic transmissions, and thus the lengthened repair cycle, in the mid-2000s, the company rebranded to AAMCO Transmissions and Total Car Care. Today, AAMCO is the world's largest franchisor of transmission specialists and car repair shops, operating over 600 franchise stores in the United States, Canada.

AAMCO is also known for its distinctive television and radio commercials, which end with a voice saying "AAMCO, double-A [car horn beeps twice] M-C-O."

The company has made heavy use of celebrity spokespeople in its advertising, and was one of the first to use a celebrity spokesperson in a television ad. Zsa Zsa Gabor was the company's first paid spokesperson.
