= MAACO =

American franchisor of auto painting and collision repair shops

MAACO Franchising, Inc.
- Trade name: MAACO Collision Repair & Auto Painting
- Type: Subsidiary
- Industry: Auto repair service
- Founded: 1972; 54 years ago
- Founders: Anthony A. Martino; Daniel I. Rhode
- Headquarters: 440 S. Church Street; Charlotte, North Carolina, U.S.
- Number of locations: 508 (2021)
- Key people: Robert Benjamin (president)
- Products: Collision repair, auto painting
- Revenue: US$518 million (2016)
- Parent: Driven Brands, Inc.
- Website: www.maaco.com

MAACO Franchising, Inc. (doing business as Maaco Collision Repair & Auto Painting) is an American franchisor of auto painting and collision repair shops based in Charlotte, North Carolina. It was founded in 1972 by Anthony A. Martino and Daniel I. Rhode.

== History ==
Ten years before MAACO's founding, Martino had launched AAMCO Transmissions with partner Robert Morgan. He created both names by using the first letters from his name (Anthony A. Martino).

In 1967, with close to 500 stores in operation, Martino sold AAMCO to Morgan.

In 1972, Martino opened a pilot auto painting center in Wilmington, Delaware. He chose the name MAACO (Martino, Anthony A. and Co.) to instill confidence in potential franchisees who knew of AAMCO’s success. The new company grew quickly, with close to 200 franchises open in less than five years.

In 1993, a MAACO franchise in Framingham, Massachusetts, won a painting contract for Massachusetts State Police cruisers, which caused controversy after a Boston newspaper reported that some of the MAACO shops involved in the contract were owned wholly or partly by Jane Gnazzo, the wife of Jerold Gnazzo, the state's Registrar of Motor Vehicles.

In October 2008, Driven Brands of Charlotte, North Carolina, a holding company which owns Meineke Car Care Centers, Inc. as well as Econo Lube and other auto service related concerns, purchased Maaco outright from Martino's family after his death in January 2008. The financial terms of the deal were not disclosed.

In January 2015, MAACO featured in an episode of Undercover Boss, following then president Jose Costa.

MAACO Franchising, Inc., has been cited numerous times by Entrepreneur magazine as America's #1 auto body shop in the Annual Franchise 500 survey.

== Advertising campaign ==
Through the 1980s and 1990s, the company ran a television and radio ad campaign featuring the slogan "Uh oh, better get Maaco". With the exception of several years in the 2010s, the catchphrase is still in use today.

MAACO was the sponsor of the Maaco Bowl Las Vegas from 2009–2012 at a reported $1 million a year.
