= Meineke Car Care Centers =

Car repair franchise

Meineke Car Care Centers, Inc.
- Type: Subsidiary
- Industry: Automotive repair
- Founded: 1972; 54 years ago (as Meineke Discount Mufflers); Houston, Texas, U.S.
- Founder: Sam Meineke
- Headquarters: Charlotte, North Carolina, U.S.
- Number of locations: 966 (2022)
- Products: Automotive repair, mufflers
- Services: Oil changes, exhaust & muffler services, brake repair, tire service, A/C services, Steering & Suspension, Battery, CV Joint installation
- Revenue: US$516 million (2021)
- Owner: Roark Capital
- Number of employees: 2,500 (2021)
- Parent: Driven Brands
- Website: www.meineke.com

Meineke Car Care Centers, Inc., more commonly known as Meineke (/ˈmaɪnɪki/ MY-nik-ee) is a franchise-based international automotive repair chain with 966 locations. The chain is ranked #52 in the Franchise 500 (2014) and #54 in America's Top Global (2013). Previously known as Meineke Discount Mufflers, the company changed its name to Meineke Car Care Centers in 2003 when it expanded to offer full-service auto repairs.

== History ==
Meineke was founded in 1971 in Houston, Texas, by Sam Meineke. He started to franchise the name in 1972, with Harold Nedell. In 1983, GKN, a multinational British company, bought out Meineke Discount Mufflers. In 1986, the company headquarters moved to Charlotte, North Carolina.

In 2003, the same year Meineke Discount Muffler Shops, Inc. became Meineke Car Care Centers, Inc., Meineke became a privately held company, no longer publicly traded.

In January 2021 the parent company of Meineke, Driven Brands, had an IPO and began trading on NASDAQ with the ticker symbol DRVN. The collision repair franchise MAACO is also part of Driven Brands along with a variety of other automotive businesses.

As of March 2025, Roark Capital retained an approximately 44.8% stake in Driven Brands following the IPO, making it the company's controlling shareholder. In May 2026, activist investor ADW Capital Management publicly proposed acquiring all outstanding Driven Brands shares for $18 per share in cash, a 41% premium over the prevailing share price, alleging that Roark had prioritized other portfolio companies over Driven Brands.

== Acquisitions ==
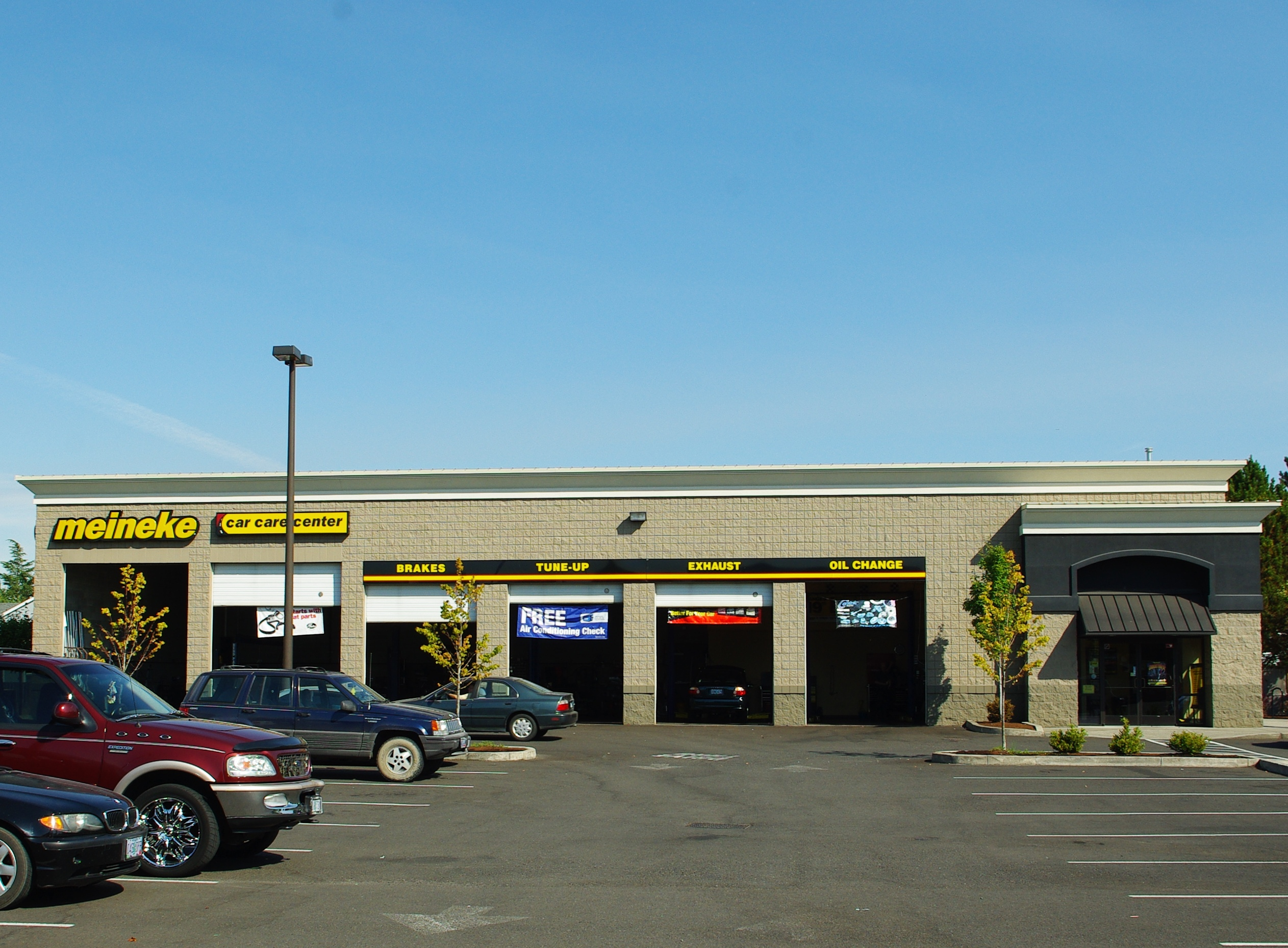
A Meineke in Hillsboro, Oregon

In 2006, Meineke Car Care Centers’ parent company, Meineke Holding Company, became Driven Brands, Inc. and acquired the quick oil change company, Econo Lube 'N Tune Inc. In 2008, it acquired Maaco, Auto Qual, and Drive N Style.

In April 2013, Meineke Car Care Centers, Inc. announced the acquisition of the Seattle-Tacoma auto repair chain, Walt's Auto Care Centers, or “Walt’s”. In June 2014, Meineke acquired eight America's Service Station locations in the Atlanta area.

== Advertising ==
Early 1970's start up franchising advertising was handled by Ruth and Howard Nedell who ran the in-house Meineke advertising agency. Pamela Ryman was her executive assistant, and office manager.

Former boxing champion George Foreman was a spokesperson for the Meineke brand in the United States from 1993 to 2010. Former NHL player Wendel Clark is the Meineke spokesperson in Canada, as well as a current Meineke franchisee.

Meineke sponsored Jimmy Spencer in the 1993 NASCAR Winston Cup Series season at Bobby Allison Motorsports. The following season, sponsorship moved to Joe Nemechek and the Cup team owned by Larry Hedrick. For the 1995 season, Meineke was on the move again, this time to the Diamond Ridge Motorsports team driven by Steve Grissom.

Meineke has sponsored college football bowl games in two locations. From 2005 to 2010, the Meineke Car Care Bowl was played in Charlotte, North Carolina, while the Meineke Car Care Bowl of Texas was played in Houston from 2011 to 2012. As of June 2020, those two bowls are now known as the Duke's Mayo Bowl and the Texas Bowl, respectively.
