= Anthony A. Martino =

American businessman

- Anthony A. Martino in 2007
- Born: January 7, 1933; Philadelphia, Pennsylvania, U.S.
- Died: January 27, 2008 (aged 75); Media, Pennsylvania, U.S.
- Occupation: Entrepreneur
- Years active: 1963–2007
- Known for: Founder of AAMCO and MAACO
- Spouse: Karen Martino

Anthony A. Martino (January 7, 1933 – January 27, 2008) was an American auto mechanic and entrepreneur.

== Biography ==
Martino was born in Philadelphia, Pennsylvania.

He, along with Robert Morgan, was a co-founder of the AAMCO transmission repair franchise in 1963, the name for which was created as an acronym of his initials. After selling his interest in AAMCO in 1967, he founded the anagrammed acronym MAACO autobody and paint-service franchise in 1972, of which he remained the CEO until his 2008 death. In 1982, he also founded the now defunct Sparks Tune-Up shops, which were purchased by the parent company of Meineke Mufflers and Brakes in 1987, as well as the Goddard Schools for Early Childhood Education in 1988. In 1990, he was named the Entrepreneur of the Year by the International Franchise Association. Maaco Collision Repair & Auto Painting sales have risen for five consecutive years as the chain of 475 centers expanded into late-model, driveable collision repairs.

Martino died on January 27, 2008, 20 days after his 75th birthday.
