= Marine City, Michigan =

- City
- City of Marine City
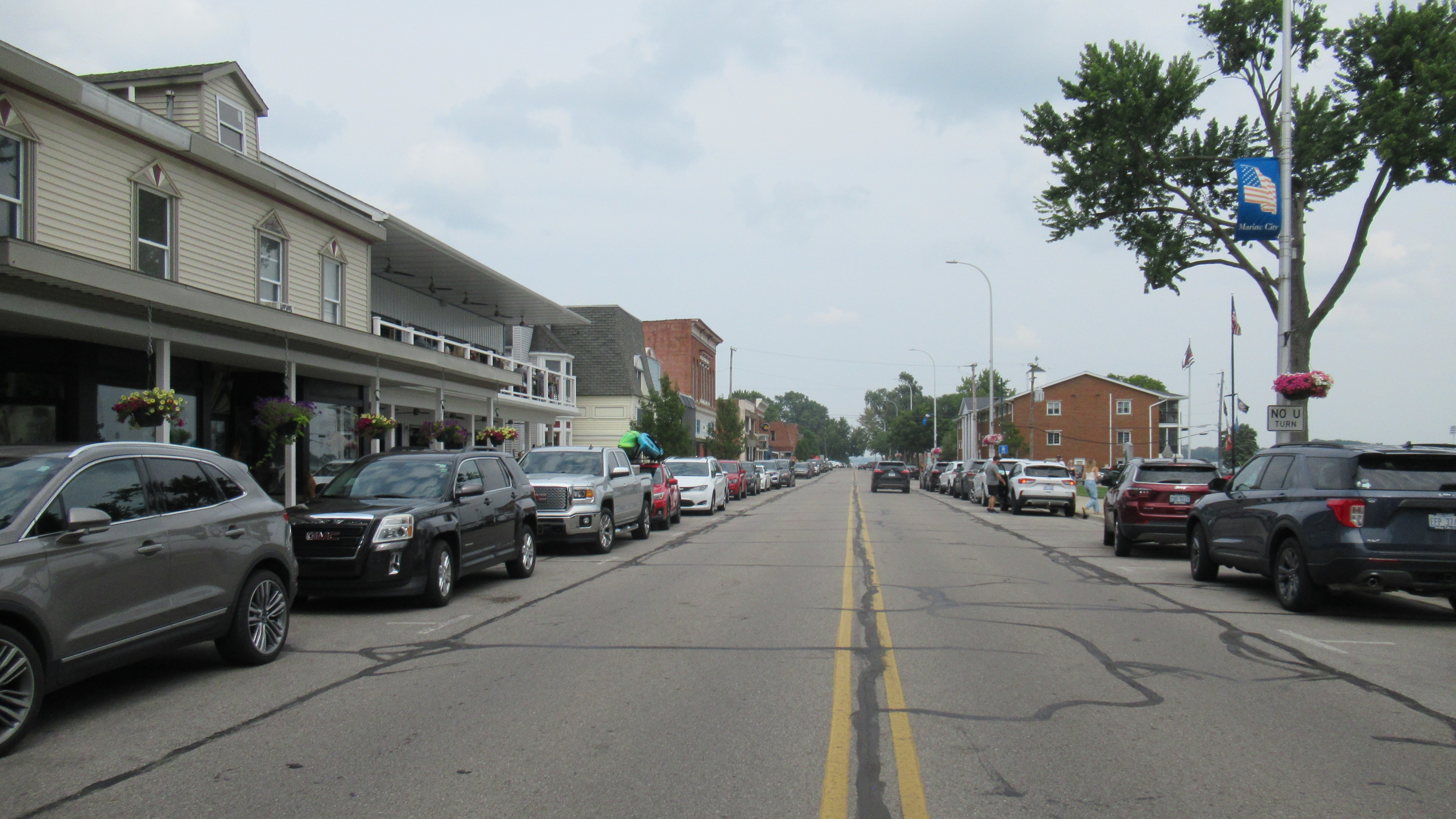
- Looking north along S. Water Street
- Motto: A Community of 1000 Adventures
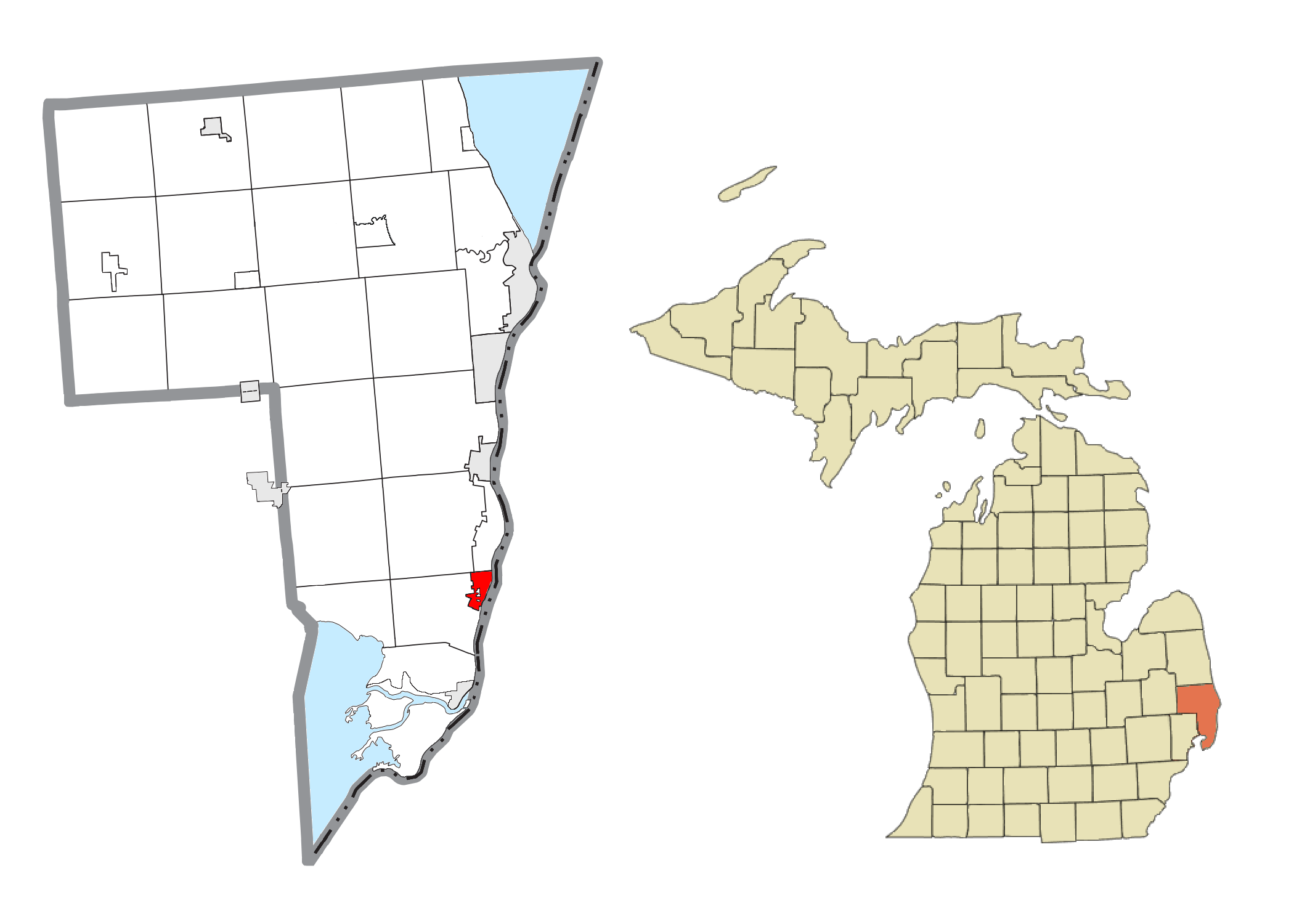
- Location within St. Clair County

- Location within the state of Michigan Location within the United States
- Coordinates: 42°43′04″N 82°29′49″W
- Country: United States
- State: Michigan
- County: St. Clair
- Settled: 1820
- Platted: 1835
- Incorporated: 1865 (village); 1887 (city)

Government
  - Type: City commission
  - Mayor: Jennifer Vandenbossche
  - Clerk: Jason Bell
  - Manager: Mike Reaves

Area
  - Total: 2.90 sq mi (7.50 km^{2})
  - Land: 2.15 sq mi (5.58 km^{2})
  - Water: 0.74 sq mi (1.91 km^{2})
- Elevation: 584 ft (178 m)

Population (2020)
  - Total: 4,079
  - Density: 1,888.43/sq mi (729.13/km^{2})
- Time zone: UTC-5 (Eastern (EST))
  - Summer (DST): UTC-4 (EDT)
- ZIP code(s): 48039
- Area code: 810
- FIPS code: 26-51600
- GNIS feature ID: 1624706
- Website: Official website

Marine City is a city in St. Clair County in the U.S. state of Michigan. Located on the west bank of the St. Clair River, it is one of the cities in the River District north of Detroit and south of Lake Huron. In the late 19th century, it was a major center of wooden shipbuilding and lumber processing.

The population was 4,079 at the 2020 census. The city formerly featured an international auto ferry service, The Bluewater Ferry to Sombra, Ontario, Canada across the river.

== History ==
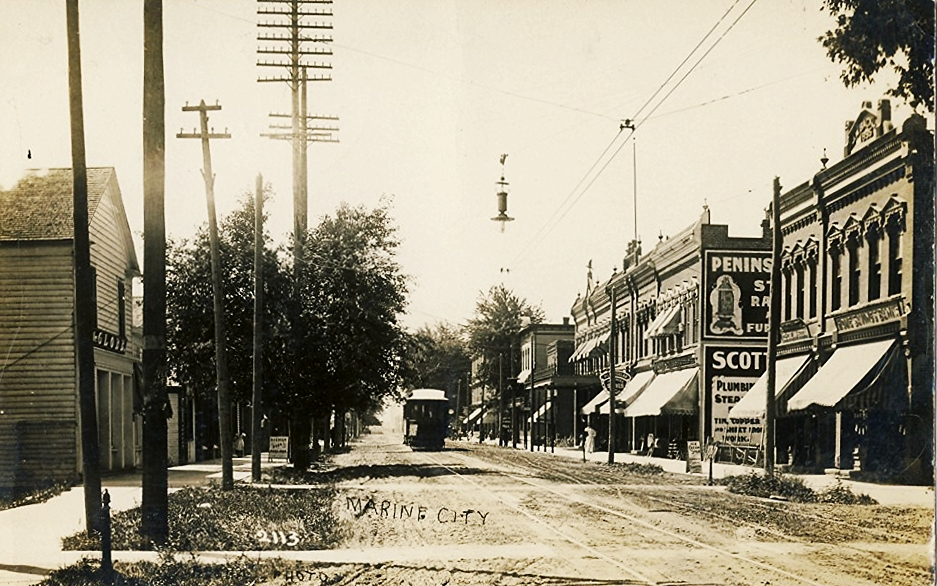
Downtown Marine City with interurban car, which traveled to Detroit. Early 20th century.

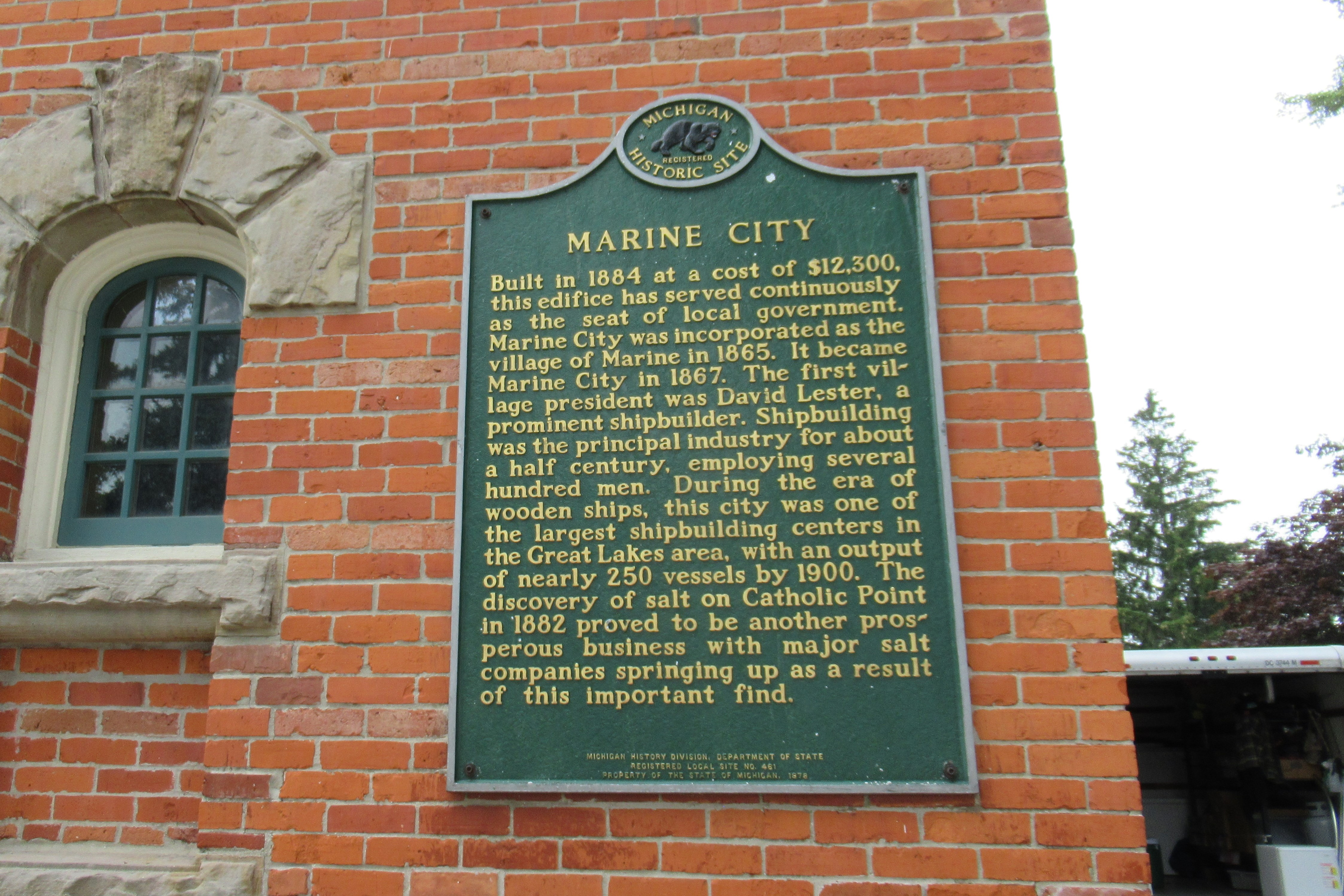
State historic marker on the former Marine City City Hall

The area of Marine City had been Ojibwa territory for centuries before the first European contact. Beginning in the 17th century, French trappers and missionaries entered the territory, followed by settlers in the colonial period on both sides of the Detroit and St. Clair rivers. Farmers developed long, narrow plots that were laid out in the typical rectangular shape of colonial French, with the narrow end along the riverfront. The first Catholic Church was built by French Catholics at Catholic Point, where they had bought land before the United States was formed. French Canadians also lived on the other side of the river in a small farming community known as Petite Côte.

It was not until after the American Revolution that European-American settlers arrived in any number. In the 1780s they obtained a deed for land from the Chippewa Indians. The Americans began to call the community "Yankee Point", because so many settlers came from the Northern Tier of states, with late 18th and 19th-century westward migration originating from New England and New York. They also called the settlement "Belle River" (Belle Riviere in French), as the French had; this later was applied as the name of a neighborhood.

The village was platted by Americans as Newport in 1835–37. Although never incorporated by that name, it was known as "Newport" for 31 years. In 1865, it was incorporated as the Village of Marine City. Thriving on lumber trade and shipbuilding, the village re-incorporated as a city in June 1887.

The second half of the 19th century was the period of great growth in the village, with many workers employed in the lumber and shipping industries. Rafts of lumber were moved down the St. Clair River in the spring to be worked at Marine City or Detroit. Shipyards built some of the many wooden ships that crossed the Great Lakes. Lake steamers linked passengers with small towns around the lakes. Their decks were full and their flags were flying. Marine City was centered on a park by the St. Clair River, where bands played in the bandstand at City Hall during the summer.

As the lumber business ran down with the exploitation of forests, the area became linked to other resource extraction. Freighters carried iron from Duluth, Minnesota, which had been mined in the Mesabi Range, to Ashtabula, Ohio for steel processing. They passed from Lake Superior through Lake Huron and to Lake Erie. Marine City was known as the town on the St. Clair River where the captains of lake freighters lived. Many of these men and their crews worked for the Pittsburgh Steamship Company. Formed in 1901 by US Steel Corporation, it became the largest commercial fleet on the Great Lakes.

In the 21st century, Marine City has become the home of ten antique stores. The Snug Theater is a 98-seat theater featuring live performances. It will be joined in 2014/15 by a sister theater, The Riverbank Theater, in a former bank building (originally Marine Bank & Trust) down the street. Also joining the two acting theaters is the old Mariner Theatre, which serves as a special event center, movie theater, gallery for fine art Models, and site of the builders model for the ocean-going Titanic. Restaurants and retail in downtown also cater to visitors and residents.

The Heather House, now operated as a bed and breakfast, was built in the Queen Anne Victorian-style. It was completed in 1885 after 2 years of construction for its owner, William Sauber. He was chief engineer for the Mitchell fleet of Great Lake steamers.

== Geography ==
- According to the United States Census Bureau, the city has a total area of 2.46 square miles (6.37 km^{2}), of which 2.15 square miles (5.57 km^{2}) is land and 0.31 square miles (0.80 km^{2}) is water.
- It is considered to be part of the Thumb of Michigan, which in turn is a subregion of the Flint/Tri-Cities.
  - Marine City can also be considered as in the Blue Water Area, a subregion of the Thumb.
- It is part of the Detroit-Warren-Livonia Metropolitan Statistical Area (MSA) and the Detroit-Ann Arbor-Flint Combined Statistical Area (CSA).

== Demographics ==
Historical population
Census	Pop.	Note	%±
1870	1,240		—
1880	1,673		34.9%
1890	3,268		95.3%
1900	3,829		17.2%
1910	3,770		−1.5%
1920	3,731		−1.0%
1930	3,462		−7.2%
1940	3,633		4.9%
1950	4,270		17.5%
1960	4,404		3.1%
1970	4,567		3.7%
1980	4,414		−3.4%
1990	4,556		3.2%
2000	4,652		2.1%
2010	4,248		−8.7%
2020	4,079		−4.0%
U.S. Decennial Census

=== 2020 census ===
As of the 2020 census, Marine City had a population of 4,079. The median age was 45.3 years. 18.3% of residents were under the age of 18 and 19.9% of residents were 65 years of age or older. For every 100 females there were 93.8 males, and for every 100 females age 18 and over there were 91.9 males age 18 and over.

100.0% of residents lived in urban areas, while 0.0% lived in rural areas.

There were 1,806 households in Marine City, of which 23.4% had children under the age of 18 living in them. Of all households, 41.2% were married-couple households, 21.5% were households with a male householder and no spouse or partner present, and 28.7% were households with a female householder and no spouse or partner present. About 35.1% of all households were made up of individuals and 16.4% had someone living alone who was 65 years of age or older.

There were 1,996 housing units, of which 9.5% were vacant. The homeowner vacancy rate was 1.4% and the rental vacancy rate was 3.4%.

Racial composition as of the 2020 census
Race	Number	Percent
White	3,809	93.4%
Black or African American	23	0.6%
American Indian and Alaska Native	27	0.7%
Asian	13	0.3%
Native Hawaiian and Other Pacific Islander	0	0.0%
Some other race	23	0.6%
Two or more races	184	4.5%
Hispanic or Latino (of any race)	85	2.1%

=== 2010 census ===
As of the census of 2010, there were 4,248 people, 1,765 households, and 1,117 families residing in the city. The population density was 1,975.8 inhabitants per square mile (762.9/km^{2}). There were 2,015 housing units at an average density of 937.2 per square mile (361.9/km^{2}). The racial makeup of the city was 96.8% White, 0.3% African American, 0.7% Native American, 0.2% Asian, 0.5% from other races, and 1.6% from two or more races. Hispanic or Latino of any race were 1.7% of the population.

There were 1,765 households, of which 31.1% had children under the age of 18 living with them, 44.6% were married couples living together, 13.3% had a female householder with no husband present, 5.4% had a male householder with no wife present, and 36.7% were non-families. 31.3% of all households were made up of individuals, and 14% had someone living alone who was 65 years of age or older. The average household size was 2.41 and the average family size was 3.00.

The median age in the city was 40.2 years. 22.9% of residents were under the age of 18; 8.2% were between the ages of 18 and 24; 25.8% were from 25 to 44; 27.9% were from 45 to 64; and 15.3% were 65 years of age or older. The gender makeup of the city was 48.2% male and 51.8% female.

=== 2000 census ===
As of the census of 2000, there were 4,652 people, 1,860 households, and 1,212 families residing in the city. The population density was 2,120.8 inhabitants per square mile (818.8/km^{2}). There were 2,006 housing units at an average density of 914.5 per square mile (353.1/km^{2}). The racial makeup of the city was 97.29% White, 0.09% African American, 0.56% Native American, 0.26% Asian, 0.86% from other races, and 0.95% from two or more races. Hispanic or Latino of any race were 1.38% of the population.

There were 1,860 households, out of which 33.5% had children under the age of 18 living with them, 48.2% were married couples living together, 12.7% had a female householder with no husband present, and 34.8% were non-families. 30.8% of all households were made up of individuals, and 14.4% had someone living alone who was 65 years of age or older. The average household size was 2.50 and the average family size was 3.15.

In the city, the population was spread out, with 27.6% under the age of 18, 8.2% from 18 to 24, 30.5% from 25 to 44, 19.4% from 45 to 64, and 14.2% who were 65 years of age or older. The median age was 36 years. For every 100 females, there were 90.4 males. For every 100 females age 18 and over, there were 88.6 males.

The median income for a household in the city was $40,146, and the median income for a family was $47,308. Males had a median income of $39,228 versus $23,677 for females. The per capita income for the city was $19,722. About 7.6% of families and 8.9% of the population were below the poverty line, including 9.0% of those under age 18 and 16.1% of those age 65 or over.

== Notable residents ==
- Steve Fisher (1912–1980), author and Hollywood screenwriter, was born in Marine City
- Stephen Benedict Grummond (1834–1894), industrialist and mayor of Detroit (1884–85), was born in Marine City
- Jeff Gutt (b.1976), second-place finisher of the 2013 The X Factor television singing competition and current lead singer for Stone Temple Pilots
- Brendon Kay (b.1989), former quarterback for the Cincinnati Bearcats and briefly with the Pittsburgh Steelers

== See also ==
- U.S. Bicycle Route 20, east end
