= February 1933 =

Month of 1933

<<	February 1933					>>
Su	Mo	Tu	We	Th	Fr	Sa
			1	2	3	4
5	6	7	8	9	10	11
12	13	14	15	16	17	18
19	20	21	22	23	24	25
26	27	28

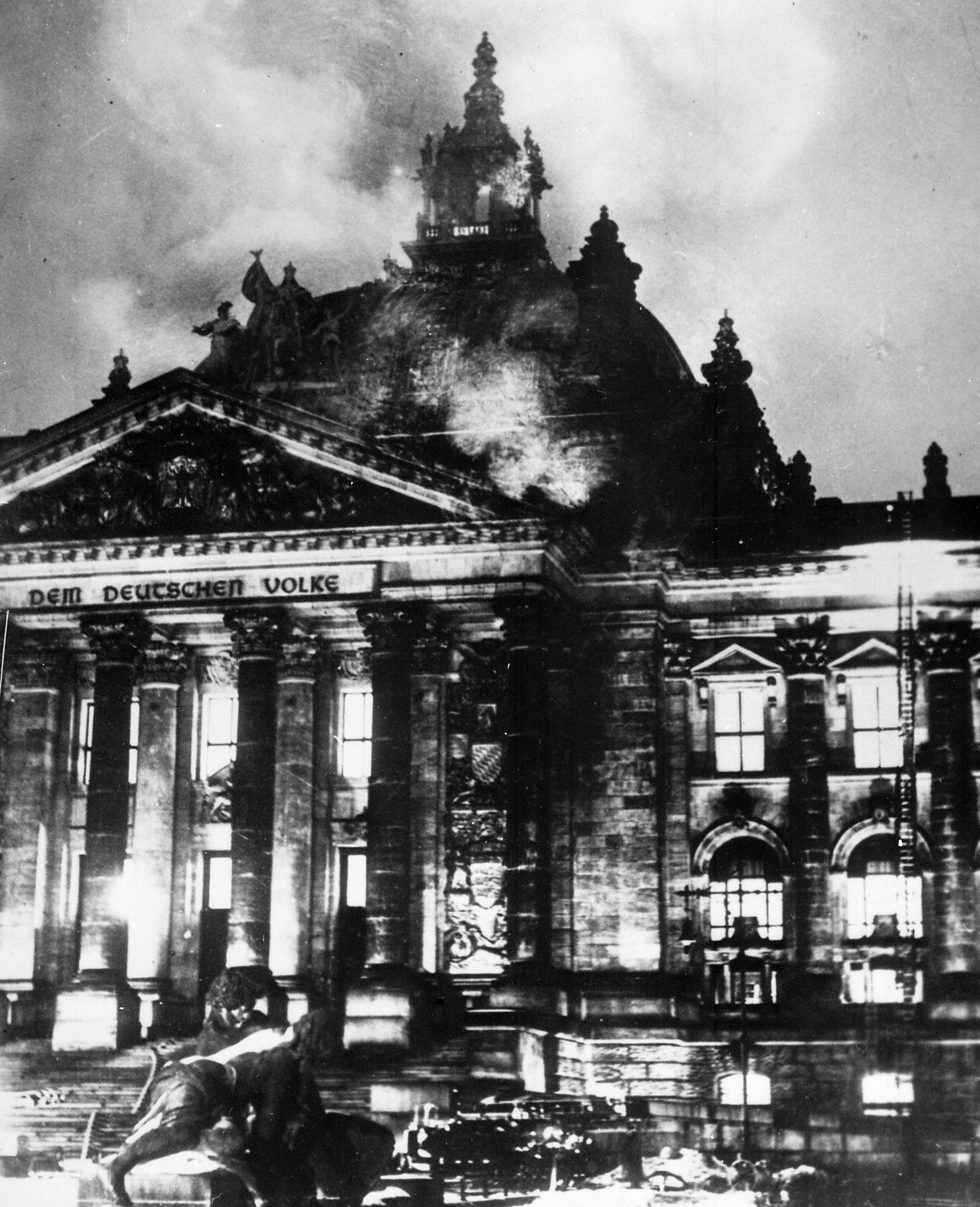
February 27–28, 1933: The Reichstag is set on fire, and national emergency in Germany is declared by Hitler

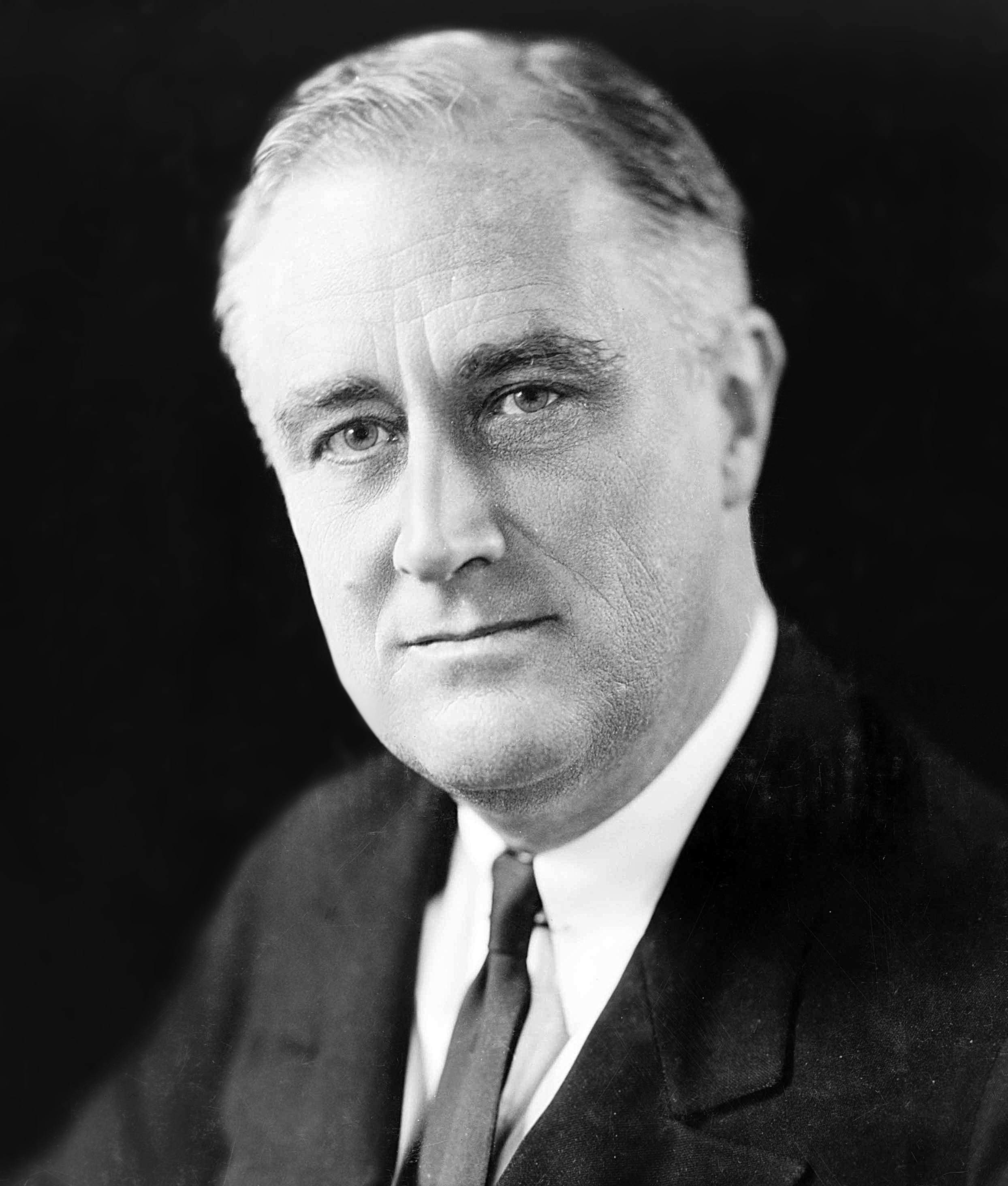
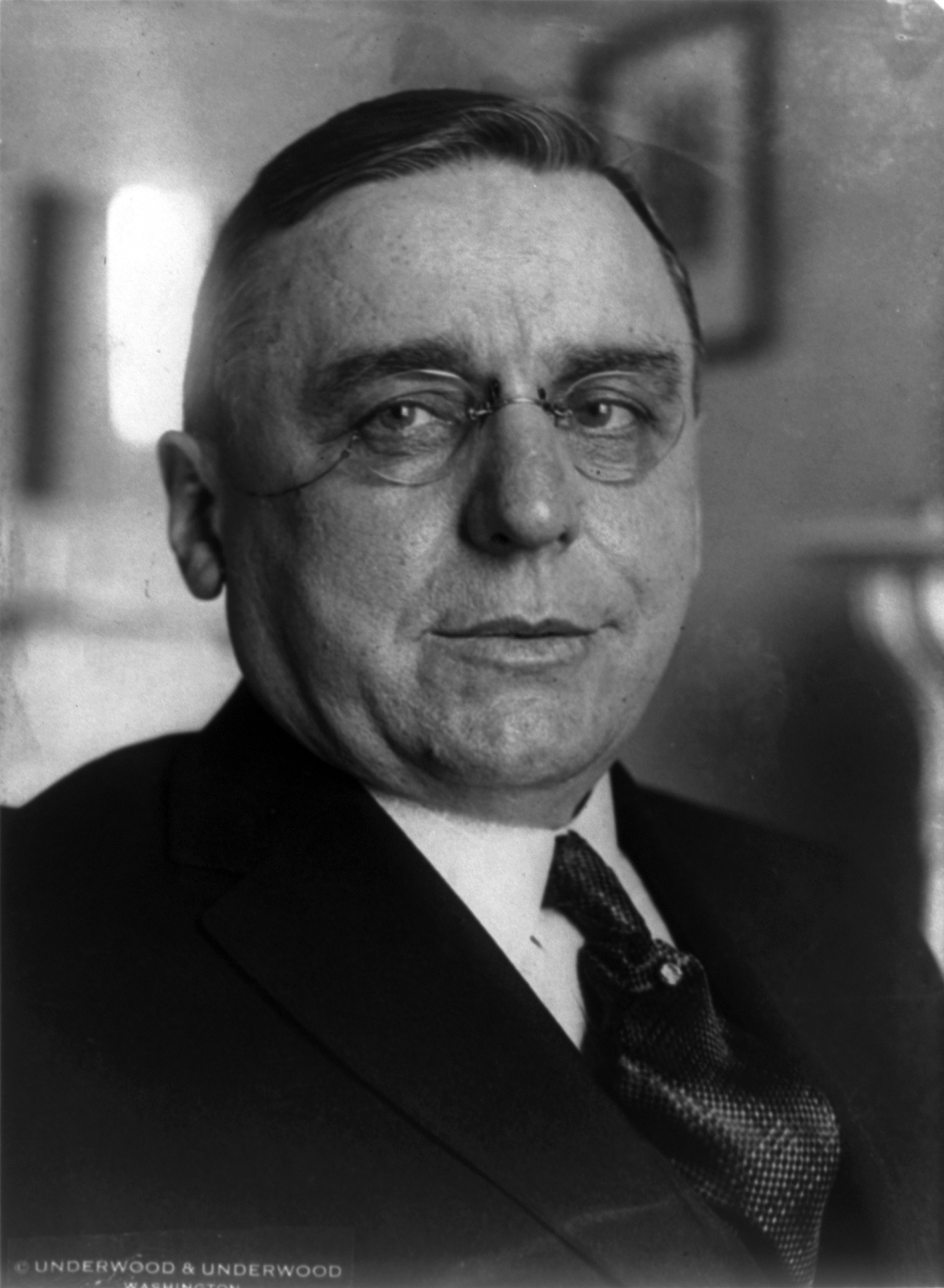
February 15, 1933: President-elect Roosevelt avoids assassination, but Mayor Cermak of Chicago is killed

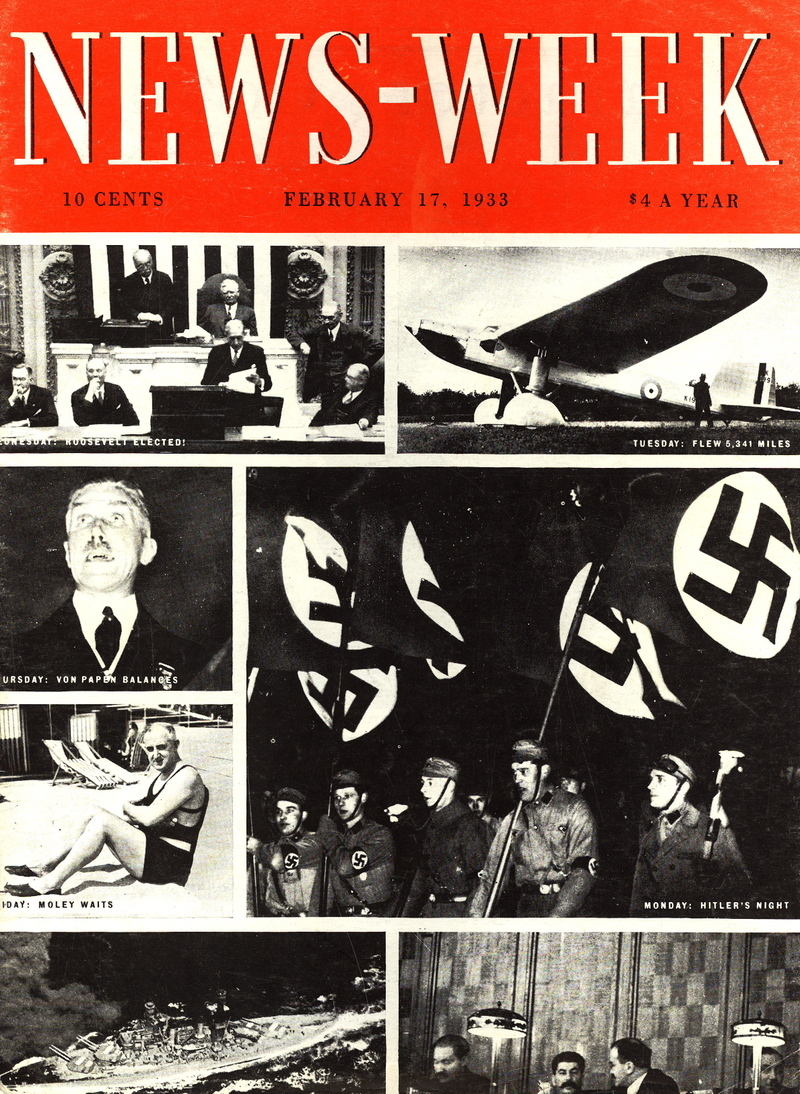
February 17, 1933: "News-Week" Magazine introduced

The following events occurred in February 1933:

== February 1, 1933 (Wednesday) ==
- In his first speech as Chancellor of Germany, Adolf Hitler addressed the Reichstag and was broadcast nationwide on the radio. He declared that "Within four years, the German farmer must be raised from destitution. Within four years, unemployment must be completely overcome." By 1936, full employment would be achieved, at the expense of suppressing all political opposition.
- Dietrich Bonhoeffer gave a radio talk titled, "The Younger Generation’s Altered view of the Concept of the Fuhrer", in which he warned that if a leader does not submit to an ultimate authority, the leader will ultimately become an idol. Bonhoeffer warned, "The fearful danger of the present time ... is that ... we forget that man stands alone before the ultimate authority and that anyone who lays violent hands on man here is infringing eternal laws and taking upon himself superhuman authority which will eventually crush him."
- Tiburcio Carías Andino took office as President of Honduras.
- Born: Reynolds Price, American author, in Macon, North Carolina (d. 2011)

== February 2, 1933 (Thursday) ==
- A ceasefire agreement was signed in Nicaragua between rebel leader Augusto Sandino and President Juan Bautista Sacasa. The withdrawal of American troops the month before prompted the government to negotiate with the Sandinistas, who were granted amnesty, a tract of land in the Coco River valley, and the right to keep 100 armed men, in return for the demobilization of the other 1,800 rebels and the surrender of weapons.
- Christine and Lea Papin, sisters who worked as servants for the Lancelin family at Le Mans in France, murdered their employer's wife and daughter. Their 1933 trial captured the nation's attention. Christine died in an asylum and Lea was released in 1941.
- After a trial broadcast that had taken place on January 30, The Lone Ranger series began regular radio episodes, delivered 3 days a week until September 3, 1954.
- Born: Tony Jay, British-American stage and voice actor, in London (d. 2006)

== February 3, 1933 (Friday) ==
- In a secret speech with Germany's senior Army and Navy commanders, Adolf Hitler outlined his plans to begin male conscription, to rearm Germany in defiance of the Treaty of Versailles of 1919, and, eventually, to invade Eastern Europe to increase Germany's territory.
- Seven members of a family in Tomahawk, Kentucky, strangled Mrs. Lucinda Mills, age 72, in what was described as a cult sacrifice ritual.
- The musical comedy film Hallelujah, I'm a Bum starring Al Jolson and Madge Evans was released.
- Born:
  - General Than Shwe, Prime Minister of Burma 1992–2003 and head of state 1992–2011, in Kyaukse
  - Paul Sarbanes, three-term U.S. Representative (1971–77), and five-term U.S. Senator for Maryland from 1977 to 2007, in Salisbury, Maryland. (d. 2020)

== February 4, 1933 (Saturday) ==
- With the approval of Germany's President Hindenburg, Adolf Hitler decreed the "Ordinance for the Protection of the German People", which allowed the police to ban any publications which were a threat to public order. Violators could be arrested and detained without a warrant for as long as three months.
- Without consulting his minister, Japan's Emperor Hirohito approved Prince Kan'in's request to deploy troops in the Jehol province of China, on the condition that the armies were not to "advance beyond the great wall."

== February 5, 1933 (Sunday) ==
- After their pay had been cut by 15%, sailors on the Netherlands ship De Zeven Provinciën seized control of it in a mutiny that took place while most of the officers had gone ashore to an officers club at Olehleh in Sumatra. After Captain Henk Eikenboom returned to the port to find that the ship had been hijacked, he pursued in the ship Aldebaran. The next day, the mutineers announced that they would sail the ship to Surabaya and turn it over to the commander before arrival, adding "We do not intend force...We only want to protest against the unjust cutting of wages and the imprisonment of those who have already protested.". The Dutch Navy intercepted the ship on February 10 and sent the mutineers an ultimatum, giving them ten minutes to hoist a white flag of surrender. When the leaders refused, an airstrike was ordered and a bomb was dropped on the ship, killing 22 people on the deck. The ship then surrendered unconditionally.
- Died: James Herman Banning, 32, African-American pilot, as a passenger in a plane crash in San Diego.

== February 6, 1933 (Monday) ==
- The Twentieth Amendment to the United States Constitution, ratified on January 23, was promulgated by the U.S. Secretary of State.
- The coldest temperature for an inhabited area was recorded at the Siberian town of Oymyakon at -68 °C (or -90.4 °F).
- Radio Athlone, a high-power Irish AM radio station that could be heard as far as southern England, went on the air for the first time as Radio Ath Luain.
- "Home Means Nevada" was adopted as the official state song of the American state of Nevada.
- Henry A. Wallace was asked by President-elect Roosevelt to serve as the U.S. Secretary of Agriculture. He hesitated for several days before agreeing to join the Cabinet.
- Born:
  - Leslie Crowther, British TV comedian and game show host, in West Bridgford (d. 1996)
  - Walter E. Fauntroy, African-American Delegate to Congress from the District of Columbia, 1971–1991; in Washington, D.C.

== February 7, 1933 (Tuesday) ==
- Officers on the USS Ramapo measured a 112 foot high (34 meters) sea-wave in the Pacific Ocean, a record that has not been topped.
- A claim upon Antarctica was made by Australia as part of an Order in Council. The government asserted dominion over most of the Antarctic continent between 45°E and 160°E, directly south of Australia.
- The United States Senate voted 53–17 to fire its long-time sergeant at arms, David S. Barry, after he had written a magazine article that suggested that some of the Senators had taken bribes.
- Died: Count Albert Apponyi, Hungary's chief delegate to the League of Nations, died at age 87 during a session of the body in Geneva.

== February 8, 1933 (Wednesday) ==
- The prototype of the Boeing 247, a twin-engine, all-aluminum airplane designed to be the first modern airliner, made its initial flight, piloted by Les Tower and copilot Louis Goldsmith.
- Franklin Delano Roosevelt was formally declared the President-elect of the United States, and John Nance Garner the Vice-President elect, as the electoral college results were announced by Vice-President Charles Curtis at a joint session of Congress. As expected, the vote was 472 to 59 in favor of Roosevelt and Garner over President Hoover and Vice-President Curtis.
- Adolf Hitler announced to his cabinet that he would pursue the goal of complete rearmament of the German people within five years, with every publicly sponsored employment program to be judged by whether it contributed to the Wehrmacht.
- The coldest recorded temperature in Texas was logged at Seminole at -23 °F.
- Born: Elly Ameling, Dutch soprano, in Rotterdam

== February 9, 1933 (Thursday) ==
- Record cold temperatures were set in the states of Montana (-66 °F at Yellowstone National Park's Riverside Ranger Station), Oregon (-54 °F at Ukiah), and Wyoming (-63 °F at Moran). The Montana reading was the lowest recorded temperature in United States history to that time. The record for the 48 U.S. states would remain unbroken until January 20, 1954 in Montana (-70 °F), and, after the admission of Alaska, on January 23, 1971 (-80 °F).
- The "Oxford Pledge" was approved by a 275–153 vote of England's foremost debating society at the University of Oxford, a resolution stating "this House will in no circumstances fight for its King and Country." Coinciding with the ascendance of Adolf Hitler to the leadership of Germany, the pacifist resolution attracted worldwide publicity and outraged many Britons. Winston Churchill described the resolution as "an abject, squalid, shameless avowal". As one observer would later note, "Most of those who took part in this debate certainly fought for King and Country seven years later", after war began in 1939.

== February 10, 1933 (Friday) ==
- The New York City-based Postal Telegraph Company introduced the first singing telegram.
- A gas storage tank at the German town of Neunkirchen, Saarland, exploded, killing 62 people and hospitalizing 160.
- Primo Carnera knocked out Ernie Schaaf in the 13th round of a heavyweight boxing bout at New York's Madison Square Garden. Schaaf suffered an intracranial hemorrhage, developed a blood clot on his brain, and died during surgery four days later at age 24.
- Ronald Reagan, age 22, began his first full-time job in radio, for station WOC in Davenport, Iowa. Four months later, Reagan was hired as a full-time sports announcer for WHO, a clear-channel station in Des Moines, where he became a local celebrity, and in 1937, his job took him to California where he became a movie star with Warner Brothers, followed by his entry into politics in 1966, and his election as President of the United States in 1980.

== February 11, 1933 (Saturday) ==
- What is now the Death Valley National Park was created by proclamation of outgoing U.S. President Herbert Hoover, who set aside the desert in southern California and a U.S. national monument. President Bill Clinton would sign legislation in 1994 making Death Valley the largest national park in the continental United States.

== February 12, 1933 (Sunday) ==
- The first offense to fall under the new U.S. Federal Kidnapping Act took place in Denver, when wealthy stockbroker Charles Boettcher II was abducted from his home and held hostage by Verne Sankey and Gordon Alcorn. Boettcher was released after payment of a $60,000 ransom. His captors became the subject of a nationwide manhunt and were captured in 1934. Sankey committed suicide while waiting to be arraigned, and Alcorn was sentenced to life in prison.
- Born:
  - Costa-Gavras (Constantinos Gavras), Greek-born film director and writer, in Loutra Iraias.
  - Ivan Anikeyev, one of the original Soviet cosmonauts in 1960, who was dismissed from the program on April 17, 1963, before completing any space flights (d. 1992).
- Died:
  - Henri Duparc, 85, French composer
  - Sir William Robertson, 73, British Chief of the Imperial General Staff during the First World War, and the only British Army soldier to rise from the rank of private to field marshal.

== February 13, 1933 (Monday) ==
- The "Warsaw Convention", formally the "Convention for the Unification of Certain Rules Relating to the International Carriage by Air", went into effect after receiving the necessary ratifications. The agreement had been signed in the Polish capital on October 12, 1929. It would govern passenger rights in international air travel for 70 years, before being replaced by the Montreal Convention in 2003.
- Outgoing U.S. President Herbert Hoover delivered his last major speech, sometimes referred to as his "farewell address", to the Republican Club of New York, at the Waldorf-Astoria Hotel.
- Born:
  - Kim Novak, American film actress (Vertigo), in Eagle Point, Oregon
  - Paul Biya, President of Cameroon since 1982; in Mvomeka'a.

== February 14, 1933 (Tuesday) ==
- With the impending failure of two of Detroit's largest banks, Michigan Governor William Comstock ordered all banks in the state to be closed for eight days, in what some economic historians argue to have caused a "domino effect" that caused other bank closures, while other historians theorize that the Michigan crisis was only one of many that would have occurred anyway. Although Nevada and Louisiana had previously declared temporary bank holidays, Michigan was the first large industrial state to have a bank closure, and other state governors ordered their own holidays. By March 3, banks in most of the 48 states had restricted withdrawals or closed entirely.
- In France, astronomer Ernest Esclangon inaugurated the first telephone service for callers to learn the correct time, referred to as the "horloge parlante" ("talking clock"). Callers to the Paris Observatory received a recorded message telling them what the time would be at the sound of a tone.
- Born:
  - Madhubala (stage name for Mumtaz Jahan Begum Dehlavi), Indian film actress, in New Delhi, Punjab Province, British India (d. 1969).
  - Nell Hall Williams, American quilter, near Boykin, Alabama (d. 2021);

== February 15, 1933 (Wednesday) ==
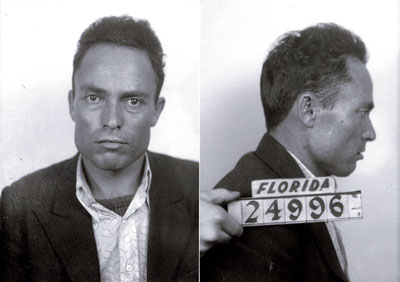
Assassin Giuseppe Zangara

- In Miami, Florida, Giuseppe Zangara attempted to assassinate President-elect Franklin D. Roosevelt, but instead fatally wounded Chicago Mayor Anton J. Cermak, and wounded other people. Shortly after 11:00 pm, Roosevelt had completed a speech at Bayfront Park and was being driven to his train in an open convertible. Zangara pushed his way through the crowd, stood on a folding chair to get a better view and was within 25 feet of Roosevelt when he began firing with a .32 caliber revolver. The chair was wobbly, and at least one bystander, Mrs. Lillian Cross, reportedly grabbed his arm, followed by another bystander, James Galloway, before Zangara was wrestled to the ground. Wounded in addition to Mayor Cermak were two women, a man, and Mr. Roosevelt's bodyguard, policeman William Sinnott. Cermak, who would die on March 6, was reported to have told Roosevelt, "I am glad it was me instead of you." Zangara pleaded guilty to Cermak's murder and was put to death in the electric chair on March 20.
- Died: Pat Sullivan, 46, Australian-born animator best known for Felix the Cat cartoons.

== February 16, 1933 (Thursday) ==
- The U.S. Senate approved, by a 63–23 vote, an altered version of the proposed repeal of the 18th Amendment and its prohibition against the manufacture, sale and transport of alcohol. The original draft of the amendment had been written by U.S. Senator John J. Blaine of Wisconsin. Senate Majority Leader Joseph T. Robinson removed provisions that would have allowed states to ban the sale of beer and liquor by bars, taverns and saloons. The amendment, approved by the House four days later, was the first, and thus far the only, amendment to the United States Constitution to be submitted to state conventions, rather than state legislatures, for ratification.
- Czechoslovakia, Romania and Yugoslavia signed a mutual defense treaty to formalize the Little Entente alliance.
- Surya Sen, who fought against the British for an independent Bengali state, was captured in the Patiala district village of Gairala, after police were tipped off by an informant. Surya Sen would be hanged on January 12, 1934 in Chittagong.
- Born: William Maud Bryant, American recipient of the Medal of Honor; in Cochran, Georgia (killed 1969).
- Died: Archie Jackson, 23, Australian cricketer.

== February 17, 1933 (Friday) ==
- The first issue of News-Week magazine was published, after being launched by Thomas J.C. Martyn, a former foreign-news editor at Time magazine. With the October 4, 1937 issue, the magazine began using its current name, Newsweek. Printing of the magazine ceased in its 80th year, with the December 31, 2012 issue being the last hard copy, and the magazine being available only in digital format until 2014 when print production restarted.
- Nina Mae McKinney became the first black American to perform on television, appearing on a broadcast made by John Logie Baird in London.
- Konrad Adenauer, who had been the Mayor of Cologne since 1917, declined to meet German Chancellor Adolf Hitler as the latter arrived at the local airport, and ordered all swastikas and Nazi symbols removed from city property. Hitler retaliated the next month by sending SS Troops to throw Adenauer from an office window. Adenauer evaded the troops and fled Cologne, hiding within Germany for three years, before being allowed to return home. He became the first Chancellor of West Germany in 1949, serving until 1963.
- In the popular American comic strip Blondie, which had started on September 8, 1930, Blondie Boopadoop married Dagwood Bumstead, the son of a wealthy industrialist, who promptly disinherited him. Dagwood and Blondie Bumstead would later have two children, Alexander and Cookie, while he worked for J.C. Dithers.
- Born:
  - Bruce P. Crandall, American Medal of Honor recipient, in Olympia, Washington (d.2026)
  - Blanche Taylor Moore, American murderer, in Concord, North Carolina
  - Masakazu Konishi, Japanese neurobiologist, in Kyoto. (d. 2020)
- Died: Corinne Roosevelt, 71, sister of former President Theodore Roosevelt.

== February 18, 1933 (Saturday) ==
- With two weeks left in his term, President Herbert Hoover sent a ten-page, handwritten letter to President-elect Franklin D. Roosevelt, misspelling the latter's name by addressing it to "President Elect Roosvelt".
- Born:
  - Yoko Ono, Japanese-born singer and artist, who married John Lennon in 1969; in Tokyo.
  - Sir Bobby Robson, manager of English national football soccer team from 1982 to 1990; in Sacriston, County Durham (d. 2009).
- Died: James J. Corbett, 66, American boxer and world heavyweight champion from 1892 to 1897.

== February 19, 1933 (Sunday) ==
- The prototype of the Vultee V-1 single-engine airliner made its first flight, at Glendale, California, piloted by Marshall Headle. Although the plane was faster than existing craft, only 24 production models were completed, mostly for American Airways (now American Airlines).
- Died: Major General James Allen, 84, Chief Signal Officer of the U.S. Signal Corps, 1906–1913.

== February 20, 1933 (Monday) ==
- By a margin of 289–121, the U.S. House of Representatives approved submitting the proposed Twenty-first Amendment to the United States Constitution, repealing the 18th Amendment's prohibition against the sale of alcohol, to the States for ratification.
- Adolf Hitler and 20 to 25 industrialists held a secret meeting at the official residence of Hermann Göring, the President of the Reichstag, in Berlin. Its purpose was to raise funds for the election campaign of the Nazi Party.
- Prime Minister Saitō Makoto of Japan convened a cabinet meeting at which it was decided to withdraw Japan from the League of Nations if a recommendation of the Lytton Report for Japan's withdrawal from Manchuria was adopted at the League's next meeting. Japan withdrew from the League four days later.
- Died: Takiji Kobayashi, 29, Japanese author and Communist party activist, after being arrested and beaten to death by Japan's secret police, the Tokubetsu Kōtō Keisatsu.

== February 21, 1933 (Tuesday) ==
- Hermann Göring, the new Nazi leader of Germany's largest state, Prussia, published a decree in the Party newspaper, the Völkischer Beobachter, ordering the Prussian police to shoot any "enemies of the state", and providing for disciplinary action against any policeman who was "inappropriately considerate".
- Six days after being expelled from the Prussian Academy of the Arts for his resistance to the Nazi regime, and fearing for his life, German novelist Heinrich Mann escaped to France.
- Born:
  - Nina Simone, American singer, pianist and songwriter, as Eunice Waymon in Tryon, North Carolina (d. 2003)
  - Virginia Driving Hawk Sneve, American Sioux Indian children's author, on the Rosebud Indian Reservation in South Dakota.

== February 22, 1933 (Wednesday) ==
- Adolf Hitler authorized the formation of the first Nazi concentration camps (Konzentrationslager), where opponents of the regime would be kept in "protective custody" (Schutzhaft) until they could reform.
- Hermann Göring appointed 55,000 members of the Nazi Party's stormtroopers as auxiliary policemen, elevating former thugs to official status.
- Augusto Sandino's rebel army laid down its weapons at San Rafael del Norte, Jinotega. Nicaragua. Although there were 1,800 rebels who demobilized, they turned in only 355 guns (including 16 automatic rifles and two machine guns) and 3,000 rounds of ammunition.
- Frances Perkins was asked by President-elect Roosevelt to serve as his Secretary of Labor, becoming the first woman ever to serve in the Cabinet of the United States.
- Young Corbett III (real name Raffaele Capabianca Giordano) won the world welterweight boxing championship over Jackie Fields (real name Jacob Finkelstein) in a bout in San Francisco. The Italian native lost the world title three months later.
- Born:
  - Katharine, Duchess of Kent, member of British royal family who converted from the Church of England to the Roman Catholic Church; in Hovingham Hall (d.2025).
  - Sheila Hancock, British actress in Blackgang, Isle of Wight, England
- Died: Michael Malloy, 59, American homeless man who survived at least six attempts on his life, was killed on the tenth attempt.

== February 23, 1933 (Thursday) ==
- From its stronghold in occupied Manchuria, Japan invaded China's Jehol Province with 30,000 troops and 1,000 from Manchukuo.
- The Soviet Union banned foreign journalists from traveling anywhere outside Moscow.
- W2XAB, Columbia Broadcasting System's only operating television station, was taken off the air as CBS cut more than $50,000 from its budget during the Great Depression. Programming would resume six years later to coincide with the opening of the 1939 New York World's Fair.
- The Nazi regime issued a decree banning homosexuality and pornography throughout Germany.
- Born: Lee Calhoun, African-American Olympic track star; gold medalist in 110 meter hurdles, 1956 and 1960; in Laurel, Mississippi (d. 1989)

== February 24, 1933 (Friday) ==
- The League of Nations voted 42–1 to condemn Japan's military occupation of Chinese territory in Manchuria. Japan was the lone dissenter, with Siam abstaining and 13 other nations absent. Following the vote, Yosuke Matsuoka led a walkout of the Japanese delegation.
- Police in Berlin raided the headquarters of the Communist Party of Germany. The Nazi government announced that the raid had uncovered documents showing that the Communists intended to burn down government buildings, private businesses, and mansions.
- Vladimir K. Zworykin presented his paper "On Electron Optics" at the annual meeting of the Optical Society of America, and outlined the principles that would lead to the development of the electron microscope.
- Born:
  - Ali Mazrui, Kenyan historian, in Mombasa (d. 2014)
  - Judah Folkman, American cancer researcher, in Cleveland (d. 2008).

== February 25, 1933 (Saturday) ==
- Four days after turning 30 and becoming eligible to collect an inheritance of several million dollars, Tom Yawkey purchased the Boston Red Sox baseball team for $1,200,000. He owned the team for the rest of his life, dying July 9, 1976.
- USS Ranger, the first US ship to be designed as an aircraft carrier (rather than being modified to serve as a carrier) was launched from the shipyards at Newport News, Virginia. Outgoing First Lady Lou Henry Hoover christened the ship.
- The name of Connecticut Agricultural College was changed to Connecticut State College.
- Arminda de Jesus is burned for witchcraft in Soalhães, Portugal.

== February 26, 1933 (Sunday) ==
- Ground was broken for the Golden Gate Bridge, starting at Crissy Field in San Francisco.
- Born: Godfrey Cambridge, African-American actor and comedian, in New York City (d. 1976).
- Died:
  - Spottiswoode Aitken, 64, Scottish-American silent film actor
  - Princess Thyra of Denmark, 79, Danish princess and crown princess-in-exile of Hanover
  - Thomas Watt Gregory, 71, U.S. Attorney General from 1914 to 1919
  - Grand Duke Alexander Mikhailovich of Russia, 66, Russian grand duke, naval officer, author and explorer

== February 27, 1933 (Monday) ==
- Six days before the March 5 national parliamentary elections, the Reichstag building in Berlin, was set on fire and heavily damaged. The blaze was discovered at 9:15 pm, and the first responders found more than 60 small fires that had been set throughout the building, with the largest in the chamber where the legislators met. Marinus Van der Lubbe, a 25-year-old Dutchman with a Communist background, was arrested at the scene and made a confession after being questioned by his Nazi captors. A former bodyguard for Sturmabteilung (SA) founder Ernst Röhm, alleged later that the Berlin SA leader, Karl Ernst, had led a group of his troopers into the building through a connecting passage, brought in incendiaries, and then waited for Van der Lubbe to arrive. "The whole truth about the Reichstag fire will probably never be known. Nearly all those who knew it are now dead, most of them slain by Hitler in the months that followed," historian William Shirer would write in 1960. Van der Lubbe was executed on January 10, 1934. The fire would be the pretext for the emergency orders the next day granting Hitler the power to rule by decree.
- Born: Raymond Berry, American football star (1955–67), and Hall of Fame member; in Corpus Christi, Texas (d. 2026).
- Died: Walter Hiers, 39, American silent film actor.

== February 28, 1933 (Tuesday) ==
- Hours after the Reichstag building had been set afire, Chancellor Adolf Hitler and his Cabinet of Ministers drew up an emergency decree for President Paul von Hindenburg to sign under Article 48 of the German constitution. "Decree of the Reich President for the Protection of the People and State" took effect immediately upon the President's signature "as a defensive measure against Communist acts of violence endangering the state". Besides suspending guarantees of "personal liberty", "free expression of opinion", "freedom of the press", "the right of assembly" and "the right of association", the decree invoked the death penalty for a wider variety of crimes, including "serious disturbance of the peace" by an armed individual. Hitler's Stormtroopers across Germany conducted mass arrests, including taking members of Parliament into custody.
- The University of Kentucky Wildcats defeated the Mississippi State Bulldogs, 46–27, in Atlanta to win the first SEC men's basketball tournament, Kentucky, with an overall record of 21–3, would later be named, retroactively, as the national college champion for 1932–33 by the Helms Athletic Foundation.
