= March 1933 =

Month of 1933

| << | March 1933 | | | | | >> |
| Su | Mo | Tu | We | Th | Fr | Sa |
| | | | 1 | 2 | 3 | 4 |
| 5 | 6 | 7 | 8 | 9 | 10 | 11 |
| 12 | 13 | 14 | 15 | 16 | 17 | 18 |
| 19 | 20 | 21 | 22 | 23 | 24 | 25 |
| 26 | 27 | 28 | 29 | 30 | 31 |

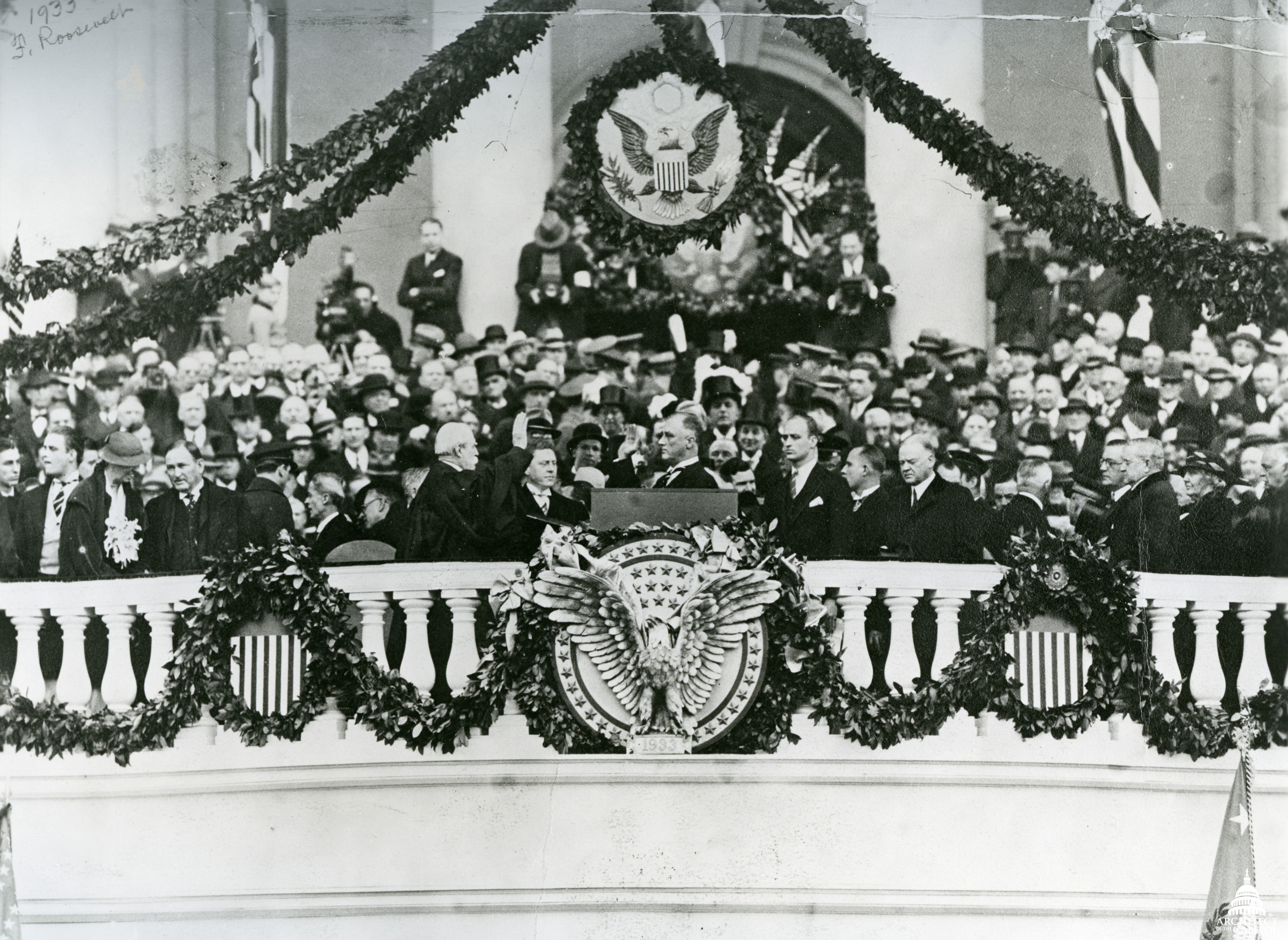
March 4, 1933: U.S. President Roosevelt inaugurated for first of four terms

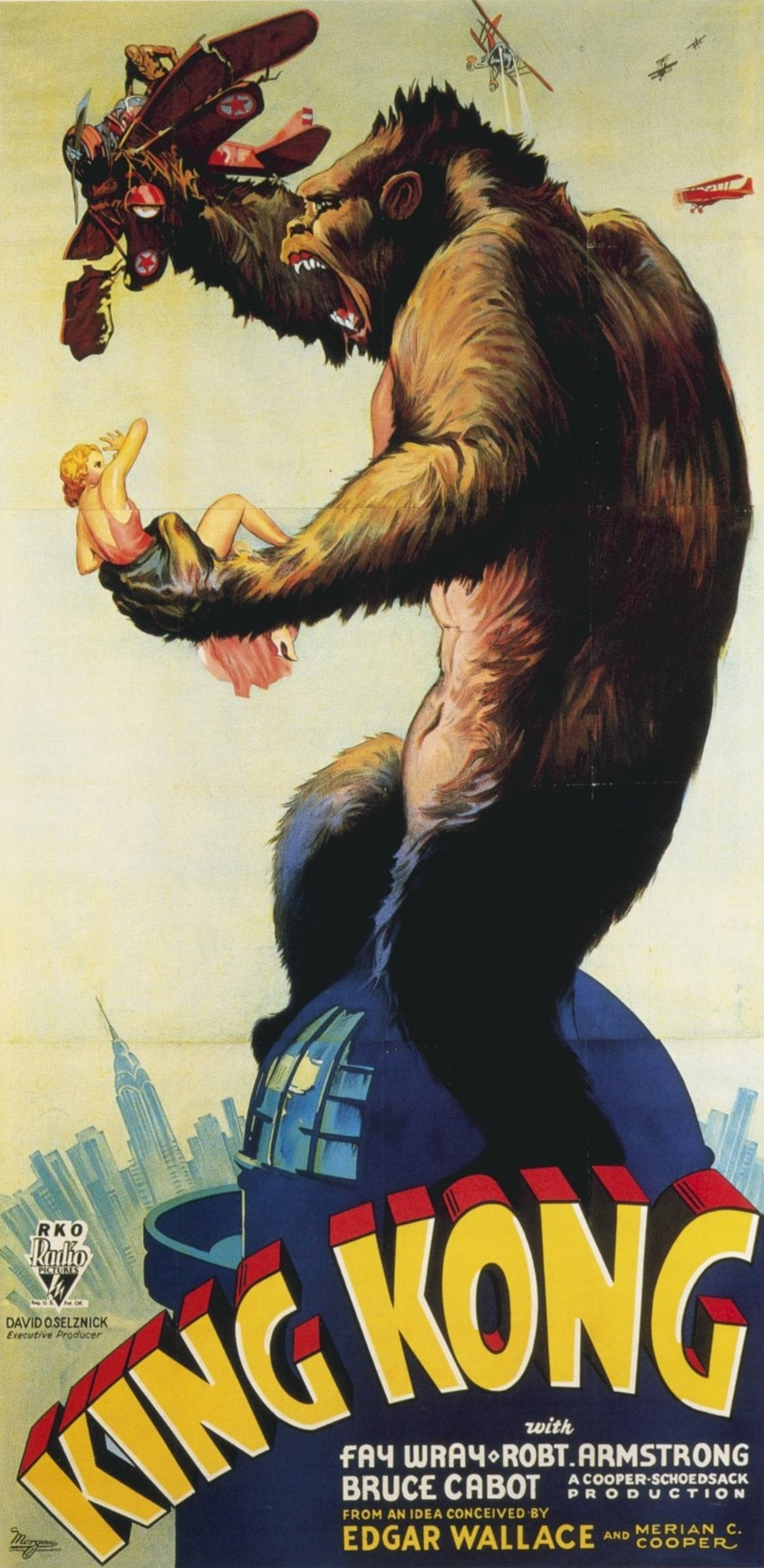
March 2, 1933: Classic film King Kong premieres

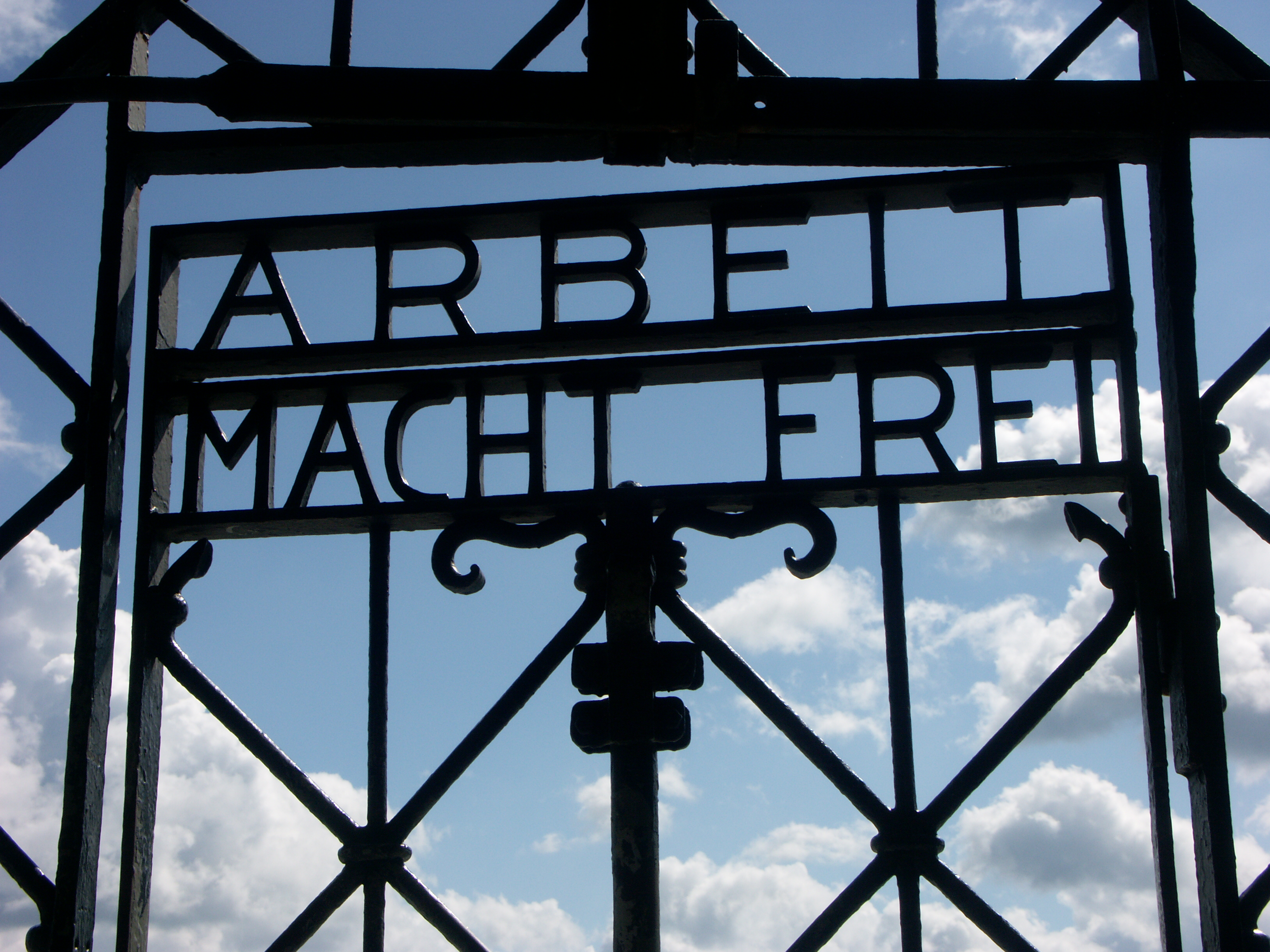
March 22, 1933: Dachau, first Nazi concentration camp, receives its first prisoners

The following events occurred in March 1933:

== March 1, 1933 (Wednesday) ==
- The fictional defense attorney Perry Mason was introduced, along with his secretary Della Street, and detective Paul Drake, in Erle Stanley Gardner's novel, The Case of the Velvet Claws, published by William Morrow and Company.
- The governor of Kentucky declared March 1 to March 4 as "days of Thanksgiving" and legal holidays on which banks could remain closed, and Louisiana and Alabama followed suit, bringing to nine the number of American states that had declared a bank holiday. Banks remained closed in Maryland, Michigan, and Tennessee, while Arkansas, Indiana, and Pennsylvania restricted withdrawals, although the closures were voluntary.
- Born: Alan Ameche, American NFL player, in Kenosha, Wisconsin (d. 1988).
- Died: Uładzimir Žyłka, 32, Belarusian poet, at a concentration camp near Kirov.

== March 2, 1933 (Thursday) ==
- The film King Kong, starring Fay Wray, premiered at Radio City Music Hall and the RKO Roxy Theatre in New York City. The movie about a gigantic ape was the first feature film to use stop-motion animation. Grossing $100,000 in its first week at the two theaters before going nationwide, the profitable film saved both RKO Pictures and the Roxy from bankruptcy.
- The number of American states closing their banks or restricting withdrawals rose to 17, as Arizona, California, Louisiana, Mississippi, Nevada and Oregon proclaimed bank holidays, and Illinois and Ohio limited withdrawals.
- Henry T. Rainey, U.S. Representative from Illinois and the former minority leader, was selected as the new Speaker of the House by his fellow Democrats, receiving 166 votes of the 301 cast. Second in the voting was John McDuffie of Alabama, with 112 votes. Rainey succeeded John Nance Garner, who had been elected vice-president of the United States.
- With two days remaining in his term, U.S. President Herbert Hoover created the America's first national historical park, at Morristown, New Jersey and the Black Canyon of the Gunnison National Park.
- Born: Robert Abbott, American game designer known as "The Grand Old Man of Card Games", in St. Louis. (d. 2018)
- Died:
  - Thomas J. Walsh, 73, U.S. Senator for Montana since 1913. Walsh was on a train that had passed Wilson, North Carolina, en route to Washington for confirmation hearings to become the new United States Attorney General, when he suffered a heart attack. With him was his bride of five days.
  - Francis Alexander Anglin, 77, Chief Justice of Canada two days after his retirement from the bench. He had served on the court for 24 years, as a justice from 1909 to 1924, and as chief justice thereafter.

== March 3, 1933 (Friday) ==
- At 2:32 a.m. local time, a powerful undersea earthquake rocked the Japanese island of Honshu. Shortly afterward, a tsunami almost 100 feet (30 m) high roared ashore, killing more than 3,000 people and destroying 9,000 homes and 8,000 boats. At an 8.9 magnitude, the quake was the largest ever recorded, rivaled only by a January 31, 1906 quake off the coast of Colombia and Ecuador.
- Ernst Thälmann, former presidential candidate in the 1932 German elections and leader of the German Communist Party, was arrested at his Berlin apartment. Notwithstanding his re-election to Parliament two days later, Thälmann would spend the rest of his life imprisoned, and would be executed at the Buchenwald concentration camp on August 18, 1944.
- Nohra concentration camp, the first of Nazi Germany's "early camps", was opened in by the Interior Ministry of Germany's Thuringia, governed by the Nazi Party, and was used to confine arrested members of the German Communist Party. At its height, it would house 220 prisoners before being discontinued in July or earlier when its inmates were transferred to a regular prison at Ichtershausen. with around 100 prisoners arriving directly from regional court prisons, the barracks of the police in Weimar or via the regional court prison in Weimar.
- Japanese troops, invading China, captured the city of Chengde, capital of the Jehol Province.
- The impeachment trial of federal judge Harold Louderback began in the U.S. Senate. Louderback would later be acquitted of all charges.
- On the eve of President Roosevelt's inauguration, more states closed their banks as Georgia, Idaho, Kansas, New Mexico, Oklahoma, Oregon, Texas, Utah, Washington, and Wisconsin, joined in declaring bank holidays, bringing to 25 the number of states under restriction.

== March 4, 1933 (Saturday) ==
- Franklin Delano Roosevelt was sworn in as the 32nd President of the United States, succeeding Herbert Hoover, and John Nance Garner was sworn in as the Vice President of the United States, succeeding Charles Curtis. In his inaugural address, Roosevelt proclaimed, "This great nation will endure as it has endured, will revive and will prosper. So first of all, let me assert my firm belief that the only thing we have to fear, is fear itself – nameless, unreasoning, unjustified terror which paralyzes efforts to convert retreat into advance." The members of the new presidential cabinet were confirmed by the U.S. Senate in only 35 minutes in an extraordinary session and then sworn in, including the first woman to serve at the Cabinet level, Secretary of Labor Frances Perkins. Thus began the first 100 days of Franklin D. Roosevelt's presidency.
- The Nationalrat, lower house of the Parliament of Austria, was suspended after Speaker Karl Renner and the only two officers authorized to succeed him (Rudolf Ramek and Sepp Straffner) resigned their positions in order to be able to cast votes on the question of measures to halt a railroad workers' strike. With the speaker's chair empty, a vote could not be called and the Nationalrat could not be adjourned. Austrian Chancellor Engelbert Dollfuss used the opportunity to suspend the Parliament entirely and to rule by decree.
- As the banking crisis continued, 37 of the 48 U.S. states closed their banks or limited withdrawals, while all 12 Federal Reserve Banks halted operations.
- Died: Solomon kaDinuzulu, 41, King of the Zulu Nation since 1913 and great-grandfather of the present king, Misuzulu Zulu.

== March 5, 1933 (Sunday) ==
- In the last multiparty election in Germany until the end of the Second World War, the National Socialist Party, led by Adolf Hitler, gained 43.9% of the votes and 288 of the 647 seats available, while the Social Democrats, led by Otto Wels, received 120. The outlawed Communist Party (KPD), led by Ernst Thälmann, was third with 81 seats, but none of the winning KPD candidates was allowed to take office.
- In parliamentary elections in Greece, the People's Party, led by Panagis Tsaldaris won 118 of the 248 seats available, defeating the Liberal Party of Eleftherios Venizelos.
- In his first full day in office, President Roosevelt called the U.S. Congress into a special session in order to pass emergency legislation to deal with the nation's economic crisis.

== March 6, 1933 (Monday) ==
- General Nikolaos Plastiras, opposed to Panagis Tsaldaris' taking office as Prime Minister of Greece, led a military coup and set up a dictatorship. Plastiras resigned the next day and was arrested, being replaced by General Alexandros Othonaios.
- President Roosevelt issued Executive Order 2039, declaring a nationwide "bank holiday", temporarily closing every bank in the United States and freezing all financial transactions. The 'holiday' ended on March 13 for the 12 federal reserve banks, and by March 15 for all banks, which then had to apply for a license. Two thousand banks did not reopen after the holiday. On the same day, President Roosevelt placed an embargo on the export of gold and suspended the payment of gold to satisfy government obligations. Finally, he declared a state of national emergency. Along with three other presidential proclamations of an emergency (on December 15, 1950; March 23, 1970; and August 15, 1971), the 1933 proclamation would not be rescinded until the enactment of the "National Emergencies Act", which would become effective on September 14, 1978, forty-five and a half years after FDR's decree.
- Eleanor Roosevelt, the First Lady of the United States, began holding weekly press conferences for female reporters.
- Herman Klink, a 40-year-old former woodworker, carried out a mass shooting in Cleveland, Ohio, killing or mortally wounding 5 people and injuring 6. Klink was shot and killed by police.
- Born: Ted Abernathy, American baseball relief pitcher for seven major league teams between 1955 and 1972; in Stanley, North Carolina (d. 2004)
- Died: Anton Cermak, 59, Mayor of Chicago, 19 days after being shot during an assassination attempt on President-elect Franklin D. Roosevelt. Cermak's physician, Dr. Karl A. Meyer, said later that Cermak's primary cause of death was ulcerative colitis: "The mayor would have recovered from the bullet wound had it not been for the complication of colitis. The autopsy disclosed the wound had healed... the other complications were not directly due to the bullet wound."

== March 7, 1933 (Tuesday) ==
- Austrian Chancellor Engelbert Dollfuss suspended parliamentary procedure and began to rule as a dictator.
- Born: Jackie Blanchflower, Northern Irish footballer for Manchester United F.C., most notable for the callous treatment received from the club due to his injuries in a 1958 plane crash that killed eight members of the team; in Belfast (d. 1998).

== March 8, 1933 (Wednesday) ==
- The newly appointed U.S. enforcement director for Prohibition announced that federal agents would no longer raid places where liquor was served, concentrating instead on manufacturers and transporters, and leaving it up to the individual states to handle a "speakeasy".
- The Committees of Unwealthy Peasants, who had led the enforcement of collective farming in the USSR, were abolished. Having overseen the confiscation of grain from local farmers for government use, the committee members were left to starve along with their fellow villagers.

== March 9, 1933 (Thursday) ==
- The government of the German state of Bavaria was overthrown by Nazi troops, on the grounds that Minister-President Heinrich Held was unable to maintain order. Governance of the former "free state" was assumed by Nazi MP Franz Ritter von Epp, whom Hitler appointed as Reichsstatthalter.
- The 73rd United States Congress began its first 100 days of enacting New Deal legislation to fight the effects of the Great Depression, starting with passage of the Emergency Banking Act.

== March 10, 1933 (Friday) ==
- An earthquake of 6.4 magnitude struck Long Beach, California at 5:55 p.m., killing 127 people and injuring more than 5,000 others. After the earthquake had destroyed more than 1,300 brick-and-mortar buildings in Long Beach, "including most of the public schools", California passed stricter building codes, given that the quake would have been catastrophic if it had struck during school hours. "The sight of school desks buried under mounds of bricks in Long Beach", an author would note decades later, "spurred the Legislature to upgrade construction guidelines in schools."
- Plans for a new radio network, the Amalgamated Broadcasting System, were announced by American entertainer Ed Wynn.
- Died Ahmed Sharif es Senussi, 59, Chief of the Senussi order in Libya.

== March 11, 1933 (Saturday) ==
- The Nazi Germany Ministry of Public Enlightenment and Propaganda, later simply the Propagandaministerium, was established by national decree. Joseph Goebbels became the first Propaganda Minister on 14 March.

== March 12, 1933 (Sunday) ==
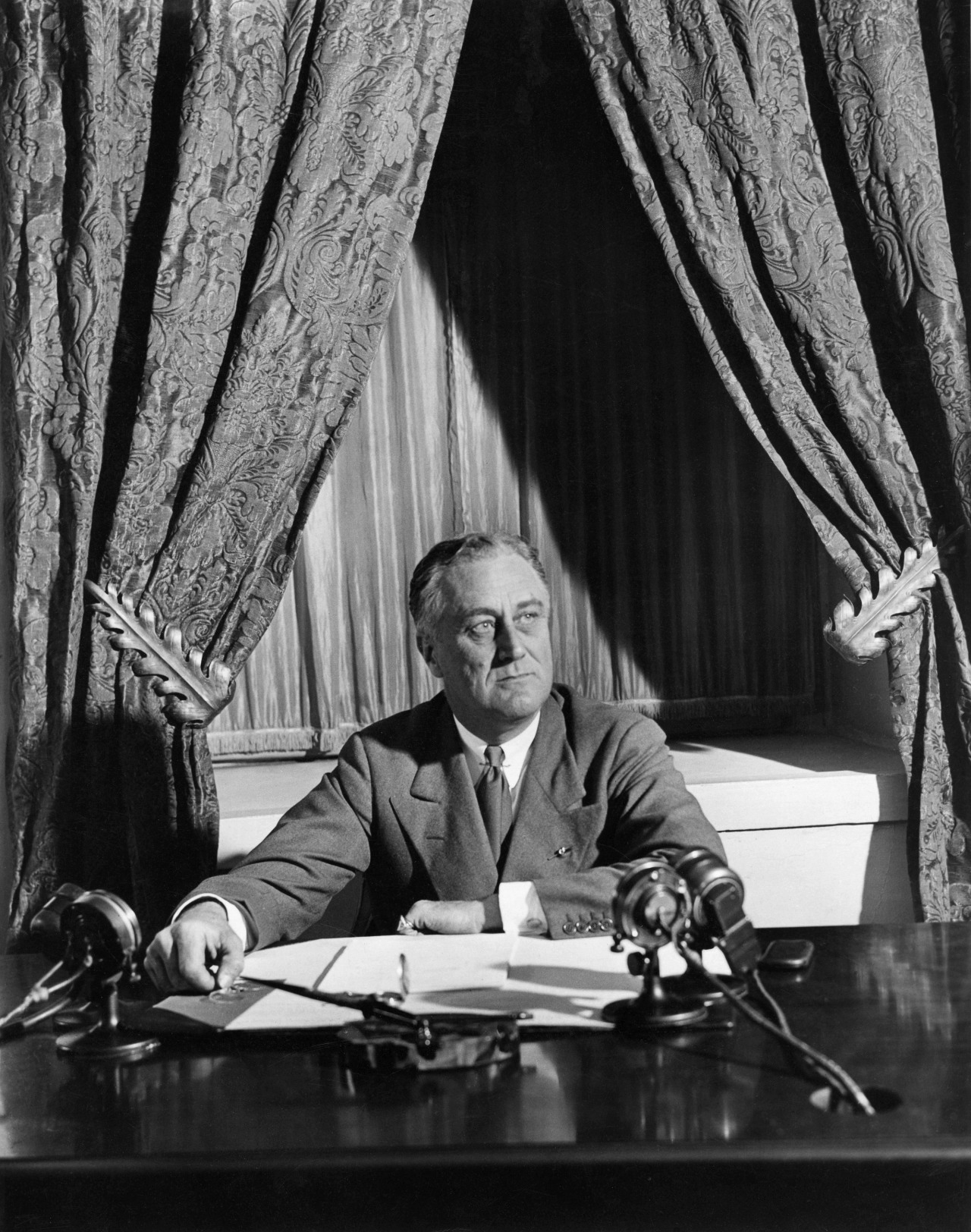
FDR on radio

- At 10:00 at night Washington time, President Roosevelt gave the first of his "fireside chats" to the American public in a nationwide radio broadcast, to explain why he had declared a bank holiday. The term "fireside chat" was coined by CBS to describe Roosevelt's second address on May 7. In all, Roosevelt delivered 28 live fireside chats, the last on June 12, 1944.
- Six British electrical engineers of Metropolitan-Vickers were arrested in the Soviet Union and charged with espionage and sabotage of electrical stations. Despite protests from the British government, the prisoners were put on trial, with five being convicted on April 19. Two (MacDonald and Thornton) were kept in prison and the other four were expelled. In April, Britain and the USSR ceased trading with each other.
- Born: Barbara Feldon, American TV actress best known as "Agent 99" on Get Smart; in Bethel Park, Pennsylvania.

== March 13, 1933 (Monday) ==
- An electrical short circuit caused a fire at the Hidalgo Theatre in Ahualulco de Mercado in Mexico. Twenty people were trampled and another 21 died in the blaze.
- Montana Governor John E. Erickson, in effect, appointed himself to succeed Senator Walsh (who died on March 2), resigning in favor of Lieutenant Governor Frank H. Cooney. Erickson resigned at 5:37 pm and was appointed senator six minutes later by the new governor, Cooney.
- Born: Mike Stoller, American popular-music composer inducted into the Rock and Roll Hall of Fame, who contributed to hits such as "Hound Dog", "Jailhouse Rock", and "On Broadway"; in New York City (d. 2011)

== March 14, 1933 (Tuesday) ==
- The American bank holiday came to an end for all banks. At the beginning of the year, there were 17,796 banks, 447 of which had failed by the start of the five-day "holiday". The nation's 5,430 unlicensed banks were limited to allowing five percent of deposits.
- Tornadoes swept through the city of Nashville, and then to points eastward in Tennessee, killing 61 people, with 15 in Nashville and another six in Kingsport.
- Born:
  - Michael Caine, English film actor, in London as Maurice Micklewhite
  - Manuel Piñeiro, chief of security for Cuba (killed in car wreck, 1988)
  - Quincy Jones, American music producer and composer, in Seattle (d. 2024)
  - René Felber, President of Switzerland 1992–93, in Bienne (d. 2020).
- Died
  - Balto, 13, American sled dog famous for saving thousands of people from an epidemic of diphtheria in 1925. A bronze statue of him was built in Central Park in 1926, the year after the relay. Balto was there for the opening ceremony of his statue. He would be the subject of a 1995 feature film of the same name.
  - Lt. Col. Gustavo Jiménez, 47, Peruvian military officer who served briefly as president, and was then defeated in the 1932 election. Jiménez committed suicide after unsuccessfully attempting to lead a revolt.
  - Anny Ahlers, 25, German film actress, after falling from a building while sleepwalking.

== March 15, 1933 (Wednesday) ==
- The Dow Jones Industrial Average rose from 53.84 to 62.10 points. The day's gain of 15.34%, achieved during the depths of the Great Depression, remains to date as the largest 1-day percentage gain for the index.
- Austrian Chancellor Engelbert Dollfuss kept members of the Austrian Parliament from reconvening, starting the Austrofascist dictatorship.
- The Soviet Union halted the further seizure of grain from farmers in the Ukrainian SSR, and ordered some stocks returned from army reserves to the villages.
- Actor Cary Grant sustained a facial injury, and Fredric March and Jack Oakie escaped unscathed, after a bomb being used in the filming of the American war drama, The Eagle and the Hawk, exploded prematurely on the set.
- Clarence Cannon and Milton A. Romjue, both Democrats and U.S. Representatives from Missouri, engaged in a fist fight in the House Office Building. Minnesota Congressman Ernest Lundeen separated the two, shoving Cannon into an elevator and then taking Romjue to a first-aid station.
- New German Propaganda Minister Joseph Goebbels gave his first press conference, instructing journalists on their responsibilities. He painted the ideal media as a press "so finely tuned that it is, as it were, like a piano in the hands of the government on which the government can play".
- Born: Ruth Bader Ginsburg, U.S. Supreme Court Justice (1993–2020); in Brooklyn (d. 2020)

== March 16, 1933 (Thursday) ==
- Philippine Governor-General Theodore Roosevelt Jr. and his wife left the Philippines after one year. Roosevelt was succeeded by Vice-Governor John H. Holiday.
- In Manchukuo, the puppet state set up in Japanese-occupied China, 50 people were killed and 70 injured when a passenger train derailed. Although few were hurt in the derailment, there was insufficient time to warn that the tracks were blocked, and a freight train crashed into the rear of the passenger train.

== March 17, 1933 (Friday) ==
- Lyman Duff was sworn in as the new Chief Justice of Canada, having served on the Canadian Supreme Court since 1906. He remained on the bench until 1944.
- U.S. Senator Huey Long of Louisiana purchased air time on NBC radio to deliver his own nationwide address, describing his plan for redistribution of wealth.
- Adolf Hitler named Hjalmar Schacht as his chief economic adviser. Historian William Shirer would later write: "No single man in all of Germany would be more helpful to Hitler in building up the economic strength of the Third Reich and in furthering its rearmament."
- Hitler named Baldur von Schirach, age 25, as leader of the Hitler Youth.
- Born:
  - Penelope Lively, British children's author, in Cairo, Egypt
  - Myrlie Evers-Williams, African-American civil rights leader and wife of Medgar Evers; in Vicksburg, Mississippi.

== March 18, 1933 (Saturday) ==
- A decree in the Soviet Union forbade peasants from leaving collective farms to seek work elsewhere without permission.
- Died: Prince Luigi Amedeo, Duke of the Abruzzi, 60, Italian mountaineer, Arctic explorer, and former Admiral in Italian Navy.

== March 19, 1933 (Sunday) ==
- Voters in Portugal approved the republic's new constitution by a vote of 1,292,864 to 6,190. The new constitution declared Portugal to be a "unitary and corporative republic", granted Prime Minister António de Oliveira Salazar the power to suspend civil liberties, and limited the legislative power. In that the results included eligible voters who did not cast "no" ballots, the actual margin was 719,364 in favor and 6,190 against.
- Born: Philip Roth, American author (d. 2018)

== March 20, 1933 (Monday) ==
- Giuseppe Zangara, 32, who had killed Chicago Mayor Anton J. Cermak while attempting to assassinate President-elect Franklin D. Roosevelt, went to the electric chair at the Florida State Prison in Raiford, Florida. His last words reportedly were "Goodbye to the world. Go ahead, push the button."

== March 21, 1933 (Tuesday) ==
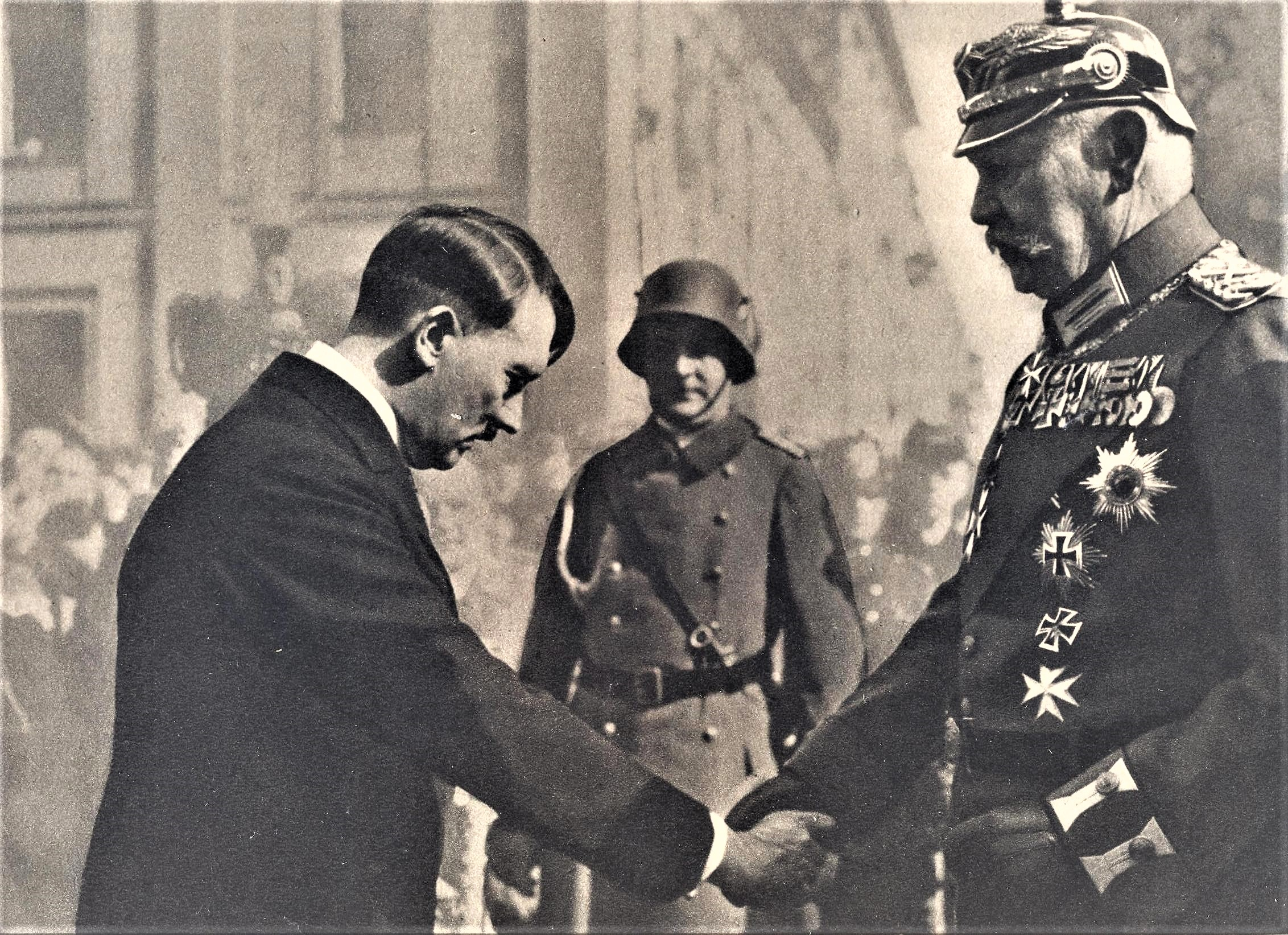
March 21, 1933: Adolf Hitler shakes hands with President Hindenburg on Potsdam Day.

- The Day of Potsdam took place at the tomb of Frederick the Great. Hitler, President Hindenburg, and former Crown Prince Wilhelm appeared together in a ceremony choreographed by the Ministry of Propaganda to symbolize the transition between Germany's past before World War I, to its future under Nazi rule.
- Germany's Nazi-controlled Reichstag parliament enacted the Malicious Practices Act (Verordnung zur Abwehr heimtückischer Diskreditierung der nationalen Regierung or "Regulation to counter insidious discrediting of the national government"), allowing the government to identify opponents of the Nazi government as "social outcasts" whose lives would be monitored and controlled.

== March 22, 1933 (Wednesday) ==
- Dachau, a Nazi concentration camp, received its first prisoners, as four police trucks brought in 200 inmates from the Stadelheim Prison and Landsberg Prison. The camp, built around a former munitions factory, was initially intended for the "protective custody" of officials of banned political parties (i.e. Communists). The following month, control of the camp was transferred from the police to the German SS.
- The U.S. State Department assured the president of the American Jewish Congress that the U.S. ambassador to Germany stayed informed about the treatment of Jews there, and that persecutions would soon cease.
- President Franklin Roosevelt signed the Cullen–Harrison Act, allowing the manufacture and sale of "3.2 beer". The act would take effect at 12:01 a.m. on 7 April.
- Born:
  - Abulhassan Banisadr, the first President of Iran (from 1979 to 1981) after the declaration of the Islamic Republic; in Hamadan. (d. 2021)

== March 23, 1933 (Thursday) ==
- By a 441–94 vote, Germany's Reichstag passed the Enabling Act (Ermächtigungsgesetz), entitled "Law to Remedy the Distress of the People and the Nation", which gave Chancellor Hitler the power to enact new laws by decree, without need of legislative approval. The majority was obtained by the exclusion of 81 Communist party members, the reluctance of the Centrist Party to oppose the legislation, and the posting of Stormtroopers to observe the debate.
- In the last open session of the German Parliament, Social Democratic Party leader Otto Wels spoke against Adolf Hitler's request for formal approval of dictatorial powers. Wels would be fortunate enough to be able to leave the country, and died in Paris on September 16, 1939.
- Jewish protesters in New York City marched to the mayor's office to protest against persecution of German Jews and to call for a boycott of German goods.
- Born: Philip Zimbardo, American psychologist and professor emeritus of Stanford University, in New York City (d. 2024)

== March 24, 1933 (Friday) ==
- Low-density polyethylene (LDPE), the first high-strength industrial plastic, was created by British chemists Reginald Gibson and Eric Fawcett at the Imperial Chemical Industries (ICI) plant in Winnington. After mixing ethylene and benzaldehyde, heating the combination under high pressure to 170 °C, Gibson and Fawcett created a waxy solid polymer. It wasn't until 1935 that Michael Perrin replicated the experiment.
- In an interview with the Universal Press Service, Adolf Hitler's press secretary issued a statement on behalf of the Chancellor. Hitler described reports of maltreatment of Jews and Catholics to be "dirty lies" and said that "there has been no discrimination whatsoever between Jews or non-Jews or Christians, or any other creed or race."
- In Berlin, the nationalist Jewish civil rights movement Central Union of German Citizens of the Jewish Faith described reports of persecution of Jews as "pure inventions", while the "Patriotic Society of National German Jews" stated that the reports were "foreign attempts to blackmail Germany".
- Ādolfs Bļodnieks became Prime Minister of Latvia, serving for one year.

== March 25, 1933 (Saturday) ==
- The U.S. presidential yacht USS Sequoia was commissioned.
- Born: Raymond A. Price, Canadian geologist, in Winnipeg (d. 2024)

== March 26, 1933 (Sunday) ==
- In a telegram from U.S. Secretary of State Cordell Hull to leaders of American Jewish organizations, the State Department announced that its investigation of conditions in Germany had determined that "whereas there was for a short time considerable physical mistreatment of Jews, this phase may be considered virtually terminated."
- Born: Vine Deloria Jr., American Sioux Indian author and activist, at Martin, South Dakota (d. 2005).
- Died: Eddie Lang, American jazz musician, 31, of complications from a tonsillectomy.

== March 27, 1933 (Monday) ==
- Japan announced it would leave the League of Nations (due to a cancellation period of exactly two years, the egression would become effective March 27, 1935)
- The Nazi Party ordered a one-day nationwide boycott of Jewish merchants, to begin on April 1 and to be enforced by the presence of SS troops outside Jewish-owned stores.

== March 28, 1933 (Tuesday) ==
- All 15 people on board were killed in the crash of an Armstrong Whitworth Argosy. The crew of three and the 12 passengers died shortly after the plane took off from Brussels, bound for London. The crash would later be determined to have been caused by a fire that may have been caused by accident or by a passenger after the plane was airborne.
- Joseph Goebbels, a film fan as well as the new German Minister of Propaganda, addressed filmmakers and union representatives at the Kaiserhof Hotel in Berlin, describing his requirements that new films reflect the Nazi state's ideals without compromising the artist's vision.
- Died:
  - Ida Siddons, 76, American entertainer and comedian, known in the 1890s as the "Queen of Burlesque".
  - Friedrich Zander, 45, Latvian-born Soviet rocketry pioneer

== March 29, 1933 (Wednesday) ==
- The "Law Concerning the Sentence and Execution of the Death Penalty" was issued in Germany to permit the death penalty by hanging for certain offences committed on or after January 30, when Adolf Hitler had become chancellor. This followed the "Decree of the Reich President for the Protection of People and State", better known as the Reichstag Fire Decree, which President Hindenburg had issued on Hitler's advice on February 28. The offences attracting the death penalty under the new law included arson of public buildings; it was dubbed the "Lex van der Lubbe" because it permitted the execution of Marinus van der Lubbe for the burning of the Reichstag building in February, even though arson had not been a capital offence at the time. It would also be used to justify the executions of any persons who had been arrested for treason in the first two months of Nazi rule.
- As famine continued in the Soviet Union, Welsh journalist Gareth Jones made the first report published in the West of the Holodomor, the starvation and genocide taking place in famine-genocide in Ukraine.
- Born: Clifford Fyle, Sierra Leonean author, in Freetown (d. 2006).

== March 30, 1933 (Thursday) ==
- Tornadoes in the southeastern United States killed 68 people.
- The Trans-Jordan assembly voted 13–3 to repeal a ban against sales of land to foreigners, opening the way for Jewish colonization of Palestine.
- Raid against Berlin lawyers in the courts, at noon.
- Born:
  - Jon Hassler, American author, in Minneapolis (d. 2008).
  - Joe Ruby, American animator, in Los Angeles (d. 2020).

== March 31, 1933 (Friday) ==
- Uruguay's civilian elected president, Gabriel Terra, established himself as the nation's dictator, ruling until his overthrow in 1938.
- The German government announced that the anti-Jewish boycott, set to take place on 1 April, would last only one day and then be "held in abeyance until Wednesday".
- The "Preliminary Law for the Co-ordination of the States and the Reich" went into effect, giving the national government control over the state governments. Under orders of Interior Minister Wilhelm Frick, the state legislatures and cabinets were "reconstituted" with Nazi Party members, and new governors were appointed from Berlin.
- The justice minister in the German state of Prussia directed that all Jewish judges, prosecutors and legal officers were to resign, and that Jewish lawyers should be limited in their number of cases. Dr. Hans Frank, the Justice Minister of Bavaria, "retired" all Jewish judges and lawyers on the same day.
- The Civilian Conservation Corps was established in the United States with the mission to relieve rampant unemployment.
