= Treachery Act =

Treachery Act may refer to:

- Treachery Act of 1934, a German law established by the Third Reich in 1934
- Treachery Act 1940, legislation from the United Kington in 1940
