= Paul Jankowski =

American historian (born 1950)

Paul Jankowski (born July 8, 1950) is an American historian and the Raymond Ginger Professor of History Emeritus at Brandeis University.

Raised in Europe and the United States, Jankowski attended Balliol College, Oxford for both his undergraduate and graduate degrees, completing his doctoral dissertation on Simon Sabiani and the rise of fascism and the French Parti Populaire Français in Marseille.

Jankowski specializes in the history of modern France and modern Europe, the history of war, and the history of international relations in the interwar period. In addition to his study of Sabiani, he has published books on the Stavisky affair, political scandals in France, and the Battle of Verdun. His latest book, All Against All: The Long Winter of 1933 and the Origins of the Second World War, is a narrative history of several events and developments, primarily in Europe and the United States, between November 1932 and April 1933, including Adolf Hitler's rise to power in Germany, the election of Franklin D. Roosevelt as president of the United States, and the first Japanese attacks against China.

== Publications ==
- Communism and Collaboration: Simon Sabiani and Politics in Marseille 1919–1944 (London and New Haven: Yale University Press, 1989; ISBN 0-30004-345-7).
- Cette vilaine affaire Stavisky. Histoire d'un scandale politique (Paris: Editions Artheme Fayard, 2000).
- Stavisky: A Confidence Man in the Republic of Virtue (Ithaca, NY: Cornell University Press, 2002; ISBN 978-0-80143-959-9).
- Shades of Indignation. Political Scandals in France, Past and present. (Oxford and New York: Berghahn, 2008; ISBN 978-1-84545-365-7).
- Verdun: The Longest Battle of the Great War (Oxford and New York: Oxford University Press, 2014; ISBN 978-0-19931-689-2).
- All Against All: The Long Winter of 1933 and the Origins of the Second World War (New York: Harper, 2020; ISBN 978-0-06243-352-7).
