= Aldo Schneider =

Brazilian politician

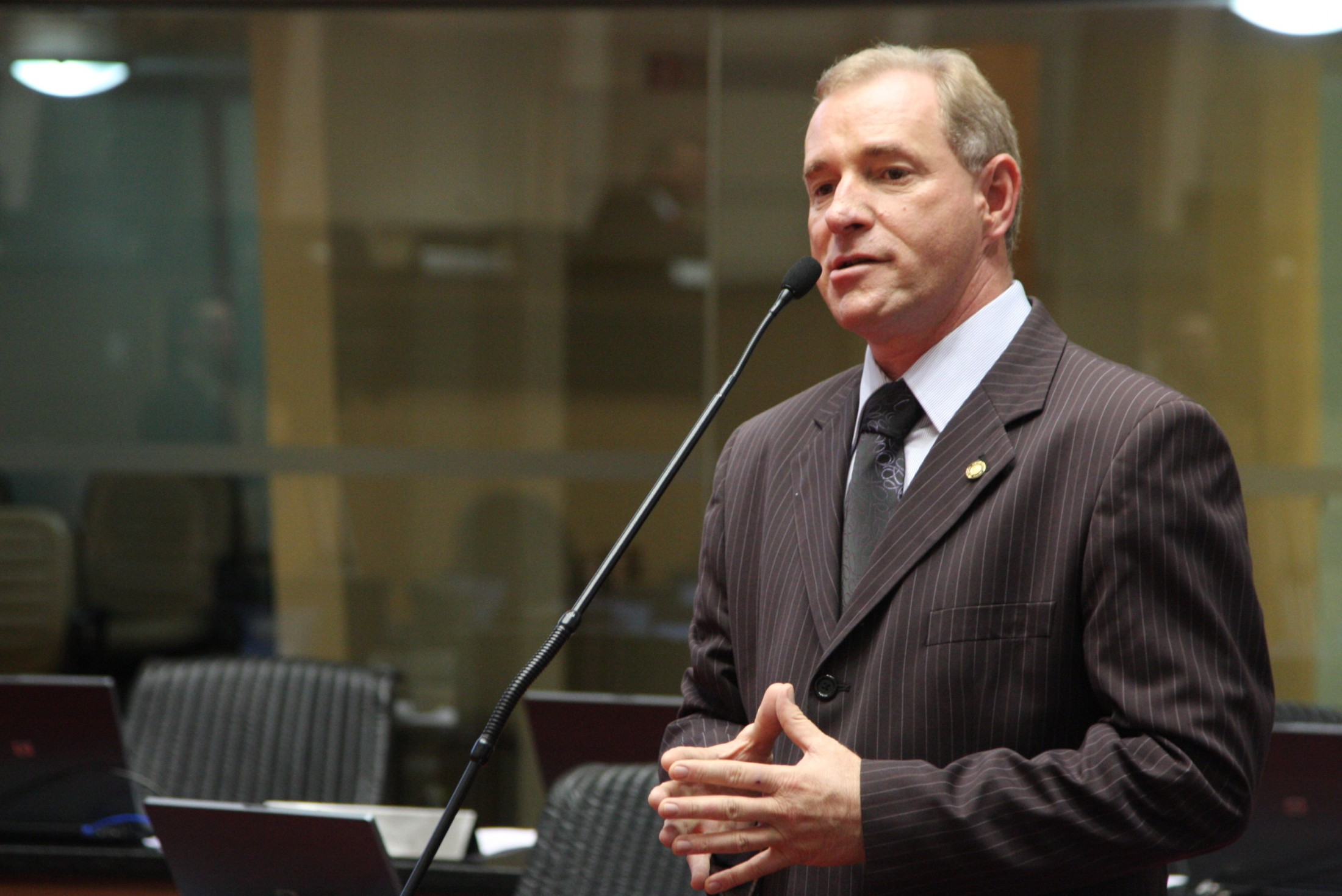

Member of the Legislative Assembly of Santa Catarina

Personal details
- Born: 23 May 1961 Agrolandia, Santa Catarina (state), Brazil
- Died: 19 August 2018 (aged 57) Balneario Camboriu, Santa Catarina (state), Brazil
- Party: Brazilian Democratic Movement
- Profession: Politician

Aldo Schneider was a Brazilian politician and member of the Brazilian Democratic Movement Party. He was a member of the Legislative Assembly of Santa Catarina in the 17th legislature from 2011 to 2015. In the 2014 elections, he was re-elected as state deputy for the 18th legislature from 2015 to 2019.

== Death ==
He died on 19 August 2018 of complications from a spinal tumor. The Chamber of Deputies of Santa Catarina spent three million reais with the treatment of Aldo Schneider, which led the deputies to vote for the end of health assistance.
