= Thomas J. C. Martyn =

British journalist (1896–1979)

Thomas John Cardell Martyn (January 3, 1896 – February 6, 1979) was a British World War I pilot, journalist, and publisher who founded Newsweek in 1933.

== Life and career ==
Martyn's father was a former British soldier who died in Johannesburg in 1905. Martyn attended, but never graduated from Oxford University, having previously served with the Royal Air Force as bomber and Home Defence pilot as a flight commander. He was injured during World War I but reports he lost a leg are unsubstantiated. He was awarded the Air Force Cross and the Military Cross in recognition of his service.

He stated in a 1925 Time magazine article about how he and fellow pilots respected and admired the famous German flying ace Manfred von Richthofen ("The Red Baron").

Von Richthofen was very well thought of by the British aviators as a clean fighter and a man who did not know what fear was

Martyn also told a story told to him by one of his fellow British Airmen, as Martyn describes:

As an example of Richthofen's fine sportsmanship, Major Patrick told me that he once had a fight with Richthofen and that his ammunition ran out. Richthofen, being in a faster machine, had Patrick at his mercy, but when he knew that Patrick was unable to fire he flew close to him, waved his hand and turned back to his own lines.

Time co-founder Henry Luce hired Martyn as a foreign news editor at Time based solely on the recommendation of journalist John Franklin Carter. Martyn did not have much journalism experience, but he was fluent in French and German and knowledgeable about European politics. Martyn was the highest-paid staff member at the time. Martyn resigned in 1925 after a dispute over expenses associated with the magazine's temporary move to Cleveland, Ohio. Martyn worked at the New York Times for several years before raising capital to start News-Week. He raised $2.25 million and published the first edition February 17, 1933. After losing money for four years, Martyn declared bankruptcy for the company and sold his interests in the magazine.

== Personal life ==
According to Isaiah Wilner, Martyn separated from his first wife and lived as a houseguest of Time co-founder Briton Hadden. In 1930, Martyn married Helen Cheney, daughter of silk magnate Howell Cheney, whose family helped bankroll Newsweek. They had two children, Howell Cheney Martyn (1932-2009) and Laura Martyn Johnson (born 1935-1991). Helen died in Hartford, Connecticut in 1958.

Martyn later remarried and lived with his wife Mary Irmgard Martyn (1920–1973) in Agrolândia, Brazil, where he is buried.
