= Treachery Act of 1934 =

German law established by the Third Reich

The Treachery Act of 1934 was a German law established by the Third Reich on 20 December 1934. Known as the Heimtückegesetz, its official title was the "Law against Treacherous Attacks on the State and Party and for the Protection of Party Uniforms" (Gesetz gegen heimtückische Angriffe auf Staat und Partei und zum Schutz der Parteiuniformen). It established penalties for the abuse of Nazi Party badges and uniforms, restricted the right to freedom of speech, and criminalized all remarks causing putative severe damage to the welfare of the Third Reich, the prestige of the Nazi government or the Nazi Party.

The law drew on nearly identical provisions in the "Regulations of the Reich president for Defense from Treacherous Attacks Against the Government of the National Uprising", established 21 March 1933, and expanded the range of sentences.

== See also ==
- Lèse-majesté
- Malicious Practices Act 1933
- Wehrkraftzersetzung
