= Article 58 =

Criminal law statute in Soviet Russia

Article 58 of the Russian SFSR Penal Code was put in force on 25 February 1927 to prosecute those suspected of counter-revolutionary activities. It was revised several times. In particular, its Article 58-1 was updated by the listed sub-articles and put in force on 8 June 1934.

In Ukraine the article corresponded to Article 54 (UkrSSR Penal Code), in Belarus – Article 63 (BSSR Penal Code). Penal codes of other republics of the Soviet Union also had articles of similar nature.

== Summary ==
Note: In this section, the phraseology of article 58 is given in quotes.

The article covered the following offenses.

- 58-1: Definition of counter-revolutionary activity:
  "A counter-revolutionary action is any action aimed at overthrowing, undermining or weakening of the power of workers' and peasants' Soviets... and governments of the USSR and Soviet and autonomous republics, or at the undermining or weakening of the external security of the USSR and main economical, political and national achievements of the proletarian revolution."
  - 58-1а. Treason: death sentence or 10 years of prison, both cases with property confiscation.
  - 58-1б. Treason by military personnel: death sentence with property confiscation.
  - 58-1в. In the case of flight of the offender in treason subject to 58-1б (military personnel only), his relatives were subject to 5–10 years of imprisonment with confiscation or 5 years of Siberia exile, depending on the circumstances: either they helped or knew and did not report or simply lived with the offender.
  - 58-1г. Non-reporting of a treason by a military man: 10 years of imprisonment. Non-reporting by others: offense by Article 58-12.
- 58-2. Armed uprising or intervention with the goal to seize the power: up to death with confiscation, including formal recognition as "enemy of workers".
- 58-3. Contacts with foreigners "with counter-revolutionary purposes" (as defined by 58-1) are subject to Article 58-2.
- 58-4. Any kind of help to "international bourgeoisie" which, not recognizing the equality of communist political system, strives to overthrow it: punishment similar to 58-2.
- 58-5. Urging any foreign entity to declaration of war, military intervention, blockade, capture of state property, breaking diplomatic relations, breaking international treaties, and other aggressive actions against USSR: similar to 58-2.
- 58-6. Espionage. Punishment: similar to 58-2.
- 58-7. Undermining of state industry, transport, monetary circulation or credit system, as well as of cooperative societies and organizations, with counter-revolutionary purpose (as defined by 58-1) by means of the corresponding usage of the state institutions, as well as by opposing their normal functioning: same as 58-2. Note: the offense according to this article was known as wrecking and the offenders were called "wreckers".
- 58-8. Terrorist acts against representatives of Soviet power or of workers and peasants organisations: same as 58-2.
- 58-9. Damage of transport, communication, water supply, warehouses and other buildings or state and communal property with counter-revolutionary purpose: same as 58-2.
- 58-10. Anti-Soviet and counter-revolutionary propaganda and agitation: at least 6 months of imprisonment. In the conditions of unrest or war: same as 58-2.
- 58-11. Any kind of organisational or support actions related to the preparation or execution of the above crimes is equated to the corresponding offenses and prosecuted by the corresponding articles.
- 58-12. Non-reporting of a "counter-revolutionary activity": at least 6 months of imprisonment.
- 58-13. Active struggle against revolutionary movement of tsarist personnel and members of "counter-revolutionary governments" during the civil war, same as 58-2.
- 58-14 (added on June 6, 1927) "Counter-revolutionary sabotage", i.e., conscious non-execution or deliberately careless execution of "defined duties", aimed at the weakening of the power of the government and of the functioning of the state apparatus is subject to at least one year of freedom deprivation, and under especially aggravating circumstances, up to the highest measure of social protection: execution by shooting with confiscation of property.

== Application ==
Sentences were long, up to 25 years, and frequently extended indefinitely without trial or consultation. Inmates under Article 58 were known as "politichesky" (полити́ческий, short for полити́ческий заключённый, "politichesky zakliuchonny" or "political prisoner"), as opposed to common criminals, "ugolovnik" (уголо́вник). Often prisoners would be released without the right to settle within 100 km of large cities.

Section 10 of Article 58 made "propaganda and agitation against the Soviet Union" a triable offence, whilst section 12 allowed for onlookers to be prosecuted for not reporting instances of section 10. In effect, Article 58 was carte blanche for the secret police to arrest and imprison anyone deemed suspicious, making for its use as a political weapon.

Article 58 was applied to Soviet citizens outside the USSR as well. In the Soviet occupation zone of Germany people were interned as "spies" for suspected opposition to the Stalinist regime, e.g. for contacts with organizations based in the Western occupation zones, on the basis of Article 58 of the Soviet penal code. In the NKVD special camp in Bautzen, 66% of the inmates fell into this category.

== Evolution ==
After the denunciation of Stalinism by Nikita Khrushchev the code was significantly rewritten.

== Opinions ==
Aleksandr Solzhenitsyn in his 1973 book The Gulag Archipelago characterized the enormous scope of the article in this way:

One can find more epithets in praise of this article than Turgenev once assembled to praise the Russian language, or Nekrasov to praise Mother Russia: great, powerful, abundant, highly ramified, multiform, wide sweeping 58, which summed up the world not so much through the exact terms of its sections as in their extended dialectical interpretation.
Who among us has not experienced its all-encompassing embrace? In all truth, there is no step, thought, action, or lack of action under the heavens which could not be punished by the heavy hand of Article 58.

== See also ==
- Gulag, 101st kilometre
- "White", a label on those considered anti-Soviet (almost exclusively in the context of the Russian Civil War 1918-1922)

=== Comparable concepts in other countries ===
- Inciting subversion of state power, Hurting the feelings of the Chinese people, China
- Berufsbeamtengesetz, Reichstag Fire Decree, Malicious Practices Act 1933, Nazi Germany
- Insulting Turkishness, Turkey
