= April 1933 =

Month of 1933

<<	April 1933					>>
Su	Mo	Tu	We	Th	Fr	Sa
						1
2	3	4	5	6	7	8
9	10	11	12	13	14	15
16	17	18	19	20	21	22
23	24	25	26	27	28	29
30

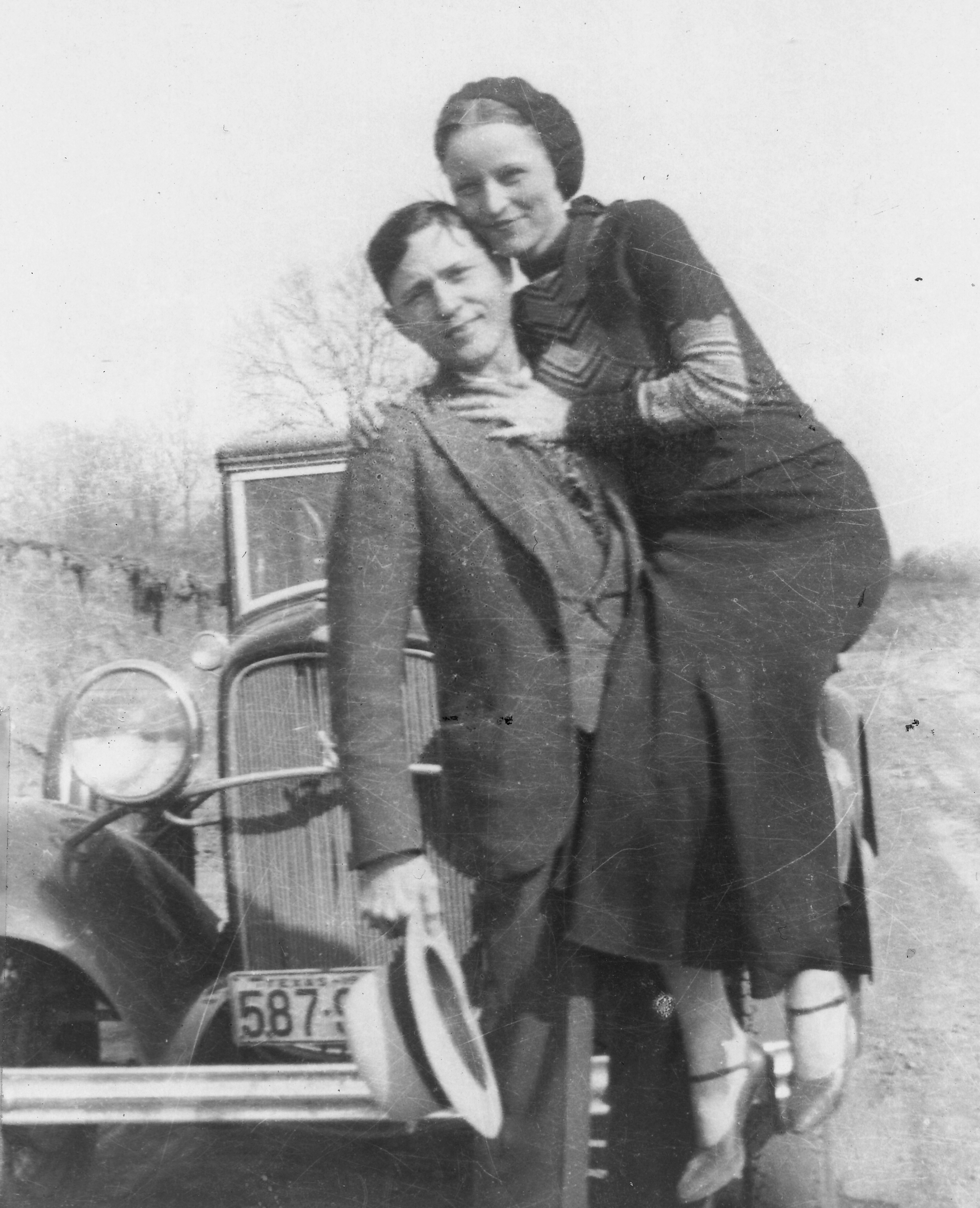
April 13, 1933: Bonnie and Clyde survive shootout, leave behind photos and evidence

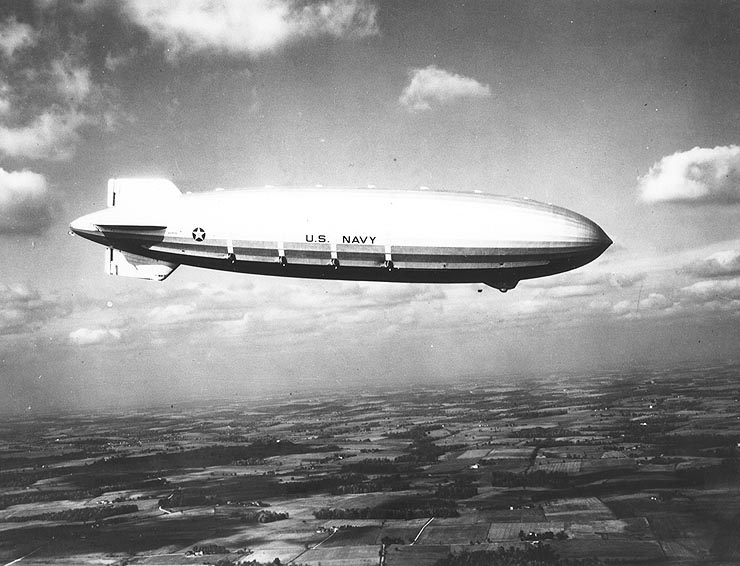
April 4, 1933: 73 die in the destruction of the U.S. Navy airship Akron

April 8, 1933: State of Western Australia votes to secede from the Commonwealth

The following events occurred in April 1933:

== April 1, 1933 (Saturday) ==
- The Nazi government organized a one-day boycott of all Jewish-owned businesses in Germany, with the assistance of Julius Streicher, publisher of the anti-Semitic daily newspaper Der Sturmer. The boycott failed to attract public support. Days later, laws were proclaimed to remove German Jews from various occupations.
- The first squadron of the Indian Air Force was organized.
- After a motion, for a vote for no confidence against the government of Prime Minister Manopakorn Nititada, was introduced in the Siamese Parliament, King Prajadhipok dissolved the session and gave Manopakorn the power to rule by decree.
- In an effort to attract more passengers to travel by train, the Louisville and Nashville Railroad and four smaller railroad companies in the southeastern United States slashed fares by one-third and eliminated surcharges on Pullman car travel. Further cuts were made on December 1, with the increased sale of tickets offsetting the revenue per ticket.
- As a member of the English cricket team touring New Zealand, batsman Wally Hammond scored a record 336 runs in a test match at Eden Park in Auckland.
- Born: Claude Cohen-Tannoudji, French physicist, and 1997 Nobel Prize in Physics laureate; in Constantine, French Algeria. (d. 2026)

== April 2, 1933 (Sunday) ==
- The Anti-Communist Act of Siam was enacted, drafted by former U.S. Congressman Raymond B. Stevens.
- Born:
  - György Konrád, Hungarian novelist and philosopher; in Berettyóújfalu (d. 2019)
  - Takashi Negishi, Japanese economist; in Tokyo.

== April 3, 1933 (Monday) ==
- In the Soviet city of Kherson, Dr Yuri Voronoy performed the first human kidney transplant, taking the kidney from a 60-year-old man who had died from a skull fracture, and implanting it into a 26-year-old woman who had attempted suicide. The donor had "Type B" blood, while the recipient was "Type O", and she died two days later.
- The first flight over Mount Everest was made by two airplanes, piloted by Douglas Douglas-Hamilton, Lord Clydesdale and Flight Lieutenant D. F. McIntyre.
- Michigan became the first state to ratify the 21st Amendment, repealing Prohibition, when the 100 delegates to its constitutional convention voted 99-1 for ratification. The 36th state, Utah, would ratify on December 5.
- First Lady Eleanor Roosevelt, the first American President's wife to hold her own press conferences, told reporters, mostly women, that beer would be served at the White House as soon as Prohibition ended. Mrs. Roosevelt emphasized that she did not drink alcohol, but that it would be available to guests of the President.
- Died: Wilson Mizner, 56, American playwright and co-owner of the famous Los Angeles restaurant chain, The Brown Derby.

== April 4, 1933 (Tuesday) ==
- At 12:33 a.m., the American airship USS Akron was torn apart by a violent storm, and crashed in the ocean, 20 miles east of Barnegat, New Jersey, killing 73 of the 76 people on board. The three survivors— Lt. Comm. Herbert V. Wiley, boatswain's mate Richard E. Deal, and metalsmith Moody E. Irwin— were brought home on a Navy destroyer. Wiley reported that the Akron proceeded northeast to avoid a thunderstorm, and that at 12:30 a.m., fell from a height of 1,600 feet into the ocean, and broke apart on impact.
- The Berufsbeamtengesetz, officially the "Law for the Restoration of the Professional Civil Service" was promulgated in Germany, requiring that all "non-Aryan" Germans (mostly Jewish) be expelled from government jobs, including academic positions at public universities. After a direct appeal by the Reich Union of Jewish Veterans, German President Hindenburg intervened to have Chancellor Hitler make exceptions for Jewish employees who had fought for Germany in World War I, or whose father or son had died in the war, or who had been employed by the government prior to the war; dismissed employees were to receive three months' salary, and those who had ten or more years of service were to receive a pension. The exemptions would be removed with the enactment of the Nuremberg Code on September 15, 1935. Among the scientists who would leave the country were 14 who had won, or would later win, the Nobel Prize.
- Died:
  - Libbie Custer, 90, widow of General George Custer. She had campaigned to have him remembered as a national hero
  - William A. Moffett, 63, U.S. Navy Rear Admiral, Medal of Honor recipient, and Director of the U.S. Bureau of Aeronautics and pioneer in naval aviation, was killed in the crash of the Akron.

== April 5, 1933 (Wednesday) ==
- The International Court in The Hague decided that East Greenland belonged to Denmark and rejected Norway's historical claim to the landmass.
- U.S. President Roosevelt declared a national emergency and issued Executive Order 6102, making it illegal for American citizens to own gold. Hoarding was prohibited, and citizens were ordered to redeem the gold for the official price of $20.67 per ounce.
- President Roosevelt's Executive Order 6129 established the Civilian Conservation Corps, following legislation signed on March 31. The first camp was created 12 days later.
- Dr Evarts Graham performed the first pneumonectomy (removal of part of the lung) as a treatment for lung cancer. By the time of his death on March 4, 1957 — also of lung cancer — the surgery had become the preferred treatment for stopping the progress of the disease.
- Born:
  - Frank Gorshin, American impressionist and comedian, also known as "The Riddler" in the Batman TV series; in Pittsburgh (d. 2005)
  - Barbara Holland, American essayist and hedonist; in Washington, D.C. (d. 2010).

== April 6, 1933 (Thursday) ==
- By a 53–30 vote, the U.S. Senate passed the Black-Connery bill, providing for a 30-hour work week with no cut in pay. The measure went to the House on April 17. By then, the National Association of Manufacturers had organized opposition to the bill, and President Roosevelt withdrew his support. The Rules Committee of the House of Representatives never voted on the bill, and the 6-hour workday never came to pass.
- The Screen Writers Guild was formed by screenwriters who were dissatisfied with the Writers Guild of America.

== April 7, 1933 (Friday) ==
- At 12:01 a.m. in each time zone, it became legal to offer beer for sale across 19 of the 48 United States and in Washington, D.C., for the first time since 1920. A full repeal of Prohibition would take place on December 5. Legally-brewed beer came with a hefty tax on each barrel. Beer went on sale in Delaware, Indiana, Kentucky, Maryland, New Jersey, New York, Ohio, Pennsylvania and D.C. first, followed one hour later at midnight Central Time in Illinois, Minnesota, Missouri and Wisconsin. Colorado and Montana were an hour afterward, and at midnight Pacific Time, in California, Nevada, Oregon and Washington.
- Died: Raymond Paley, 26, English mathematician who discovered the Paley construction for Hadamard matrices, the Paley graphs in graph theory, the Paley–Wiener theorem in harmonic analysis, the Paley–Zygmund inequality and the Littlewood–Paley theory. Paley was killed in an avalanche during a skiing trip in the Canadian Rockies.

== April 8, 1933 (Saturday) ==
- In a referendum in the state of Western Australia, voters overwhelmingly (138,653 to 70,706) favored seceding from the rest of Australia. The British House of Commons would conclude that the request could not be honored because the Statute of Westminster 1931 required approval also by the Australian federal government.
- Austrian musician Herbert von Karajan, who aspired to become a musical conductor, joined the Nazi Party in Austria the day after Germany began removing Jews from occupations. Reasoning that the removal of Jews from existing musical jobs would make more jobs available to him, Karajan concluded that party membership would allow him to advance his career more quickly. Five years to the day later, he conducted the Berlin Philharmonic orchestra for his first time.

== April 9, 1933 (Sunday) ==
- The first of the series of retrials of the Scottsboro Boys ended. Haywood Patterson was again found guilty of rape and sentenced to execution.
- Born: Gian Maria Volonté a/k/a "Johnny Weis", Italian actor who played the villain against Clint Eastwood in A Fistful of Dollars and For a Few Dollars More; in Milan (d. 1994).

== April 10, 1933 (Monday) ==
- Pope Pius XI met Nazi German politicians Hermann Göring and Franz von Papen in Rome.
- Japanese troops, already occupying China's Rehe Province, began marching south toward the Chinese capital of Beijing.
- The American film King Kong, about a giant ape who terrorized Manhattan, opened nationwide after its successful debut in New York City.
- The Field Act passed in California to provide for construction of "earthquake-proof" schools.

== April 11, 1933 (Tuesday) ==
- British aviator William M. Lancaster left England attempting to break the record for flying from England to South Africa.
- Four days after the first laws were enacted against employment of Jews in Germany, an amendment was added to clarify who would be excluded. "It is enough for one parent or grandparent to be non-Aryan", a memorandum from Interior Minister Wilhelm Frick explained, adding, "This is to be assumed, especially if one parent or one grandparent was of the Jewish faith."

== April 12, 1933 (Wednesday) ==
- Nazi Germany announced a census of all Germans. Reich Statistical Office Director Friedrich Bürgdorfer, who was also the director of the Nazi Party's "Race Political Office" set out to use the census to identify every Jew and non-Aryan in the nation. IBM and its German subsidiary, Dehomag (Deustche Hollerith Maschinen Gesellschaft), contracted with the government to supply IBM computers and to train employees to use them in tabulating the data—within a few months rather than three or more years.
- In Philadelphia, Harvey Fletcher of Bell Laboratories demonstrated stereo sound to an astonished audience of 300 investors and reporters who had been invited to witness the demonstration of high fidelity.
- William Lancaster vanished departing Reggane, in French Algeria and flying over the Sahara Desert in his airplane, the Southern Cross Minor. When the plane's engine failed an hour later, Lancaster landed in the desert and survived for eight days until running out of water.
- Born: Montserrat Caballé, Spanish Catalan operatic soprano; in Barcelona. (d. 2018)
- Died:
  - Adelbert Ames, 97, Governor of Mississippi (1868–70 and 1874–76) and U.S. Senator (1870–74) during Reconstruction, and the last surviving General to have served in the American Civil War. A native of Maine, he had fought on the Union side.
  - Zelia Nuttall, 75, Mexican archaeologist and anthropologist.

== April 13, 1933 (Thursday) ==
- A breakthrough in the hunt for outlaws Bonnie and Clyde was made after police were called to 3347 1/2 Oak Ridge Drive in Joplin, Missouri. In the shootout that followed, lawmen J. W. Harryman and Harry McGinnis were killed and the gang escaped, but left behind photographs of the group, a pardon issued on March 20 to Clyde Barrow's brother Buck, and Bonnie Parker's poem.
- The New York Rangers won the Stanley Cup, at the time a best-of-five series, in Game 4, with a 1–0 overtime victory against the Toronto Maple Leafs. Bill Cook, the NHL's leading scorer, sent the puck past Lorne Chabot at 7 minutes, 34 seconds in an overtime period.
- Demyan Bedny became the first writer to receive the Soviet Union's highest honor, the Order of Lenin.
- The first full sized aeroplane with a steam engine, a Travel Air biplane, made its first flight in Oakland, California.
- Born: Ben Nighthorse Campbell, American Indian who served as U.S. Senator for Colorado (1993–2005); in Auburn, California. (d. 2025)

== April 14, 1933 (Friday) ==
- Mr and Mrs John Mackay, of Drumnadrochit in Scotland, were driving near Loch Ness, Scotland, when they spotted what they described to a reporter for the Inverness Courier as "an enormous animal rolling and plunging" in the lake's waters. The newspaper described the creature as a monster. On May 12, the Courier, possibly drawing on earlier sightings and a legend dating back to St Columba, published the story, thereby creating an internationally known legend under the headline "Loch Ness Monster", and in the month that followed, 20 people would say that they witnessed the same creature.
- One week before Winnie Ruth Judd was scheduled to be hanged for murder, hearings began to determine her sanity at the time of the "trunk murders" committed on October 16, 1931. After a jury found her to be insane, she was committed to the Arizona State Hospital, from which she escaped seven times, including one stint where she was at large from 1963 to 1969. She would be paroled in 1971 and would live until 1998.
- Born: Morton Subotnick, American electronic music composer; in Los Angeles.

== April 15, 1933 (Saturday) ==
- Regents for the University System of Georgia voted to abolish eight colleges, only one of which would remain open. Those closing were located at Bowdon (Bowdon State College); Clarkesville (Ninth District A & M); Madison (Eighth District A & M); Monroe (Georgia Vocational and Trades); and Powder Springs (Seventh District A & M). Fourth District A & M at Carrollton was replaced by West Georgia College and Georgia State College at Tifton gave way to a 2-year college of agriculture. The Medical College of Georgia, in operation for 105 years, was initially closed, but the decision was later reversed and the school is now Georgia Health Sciences University.
- Born:
  - Elizabeth Montgomery, American actress, best known as Samantha Stephens on the TV show Bewitched; in Los Angeles (d. 1995)
  - Roy Clark, American country musician and host of the TV show Hee Haw; in Meherrin, Virginia (d. 2018)
  - Sir David Martin, Australian Admiral and Governor of New South Wales; in Sydney (d. 1990)

== April 16, 1933 (Sunday) ==
- Bob Carey, the defending American automobile racing champion, was killed at the age of 28 while practicing for a race at Legion Ascot Speedway near Los Angeles. Carey, who had won the driving championship in 1932, had been minutes away from the start of the feature race.
- Born:
  - Joan Bakewell, British broadcaster and Baroness; in Stockport, Greater Manchester
  - Ike Pappas, American television reporter for CBS; in New York City (d. 2008).

== April 17, 1933 (Monday) ==
- The first Civilian Conservation Corps camp was opened, near Luray, Virginia, and designated as "Camp Roosevelt", with 200 young men working for the U.S. Forestry Service. By July there were 1,468 camps in U.S. parks and forests, with 250,000 employees, 25,000 supervisors and 25,000 experienced woodsmen put to work at various tasks to improve the environment.
- Born: Joachim Kroll, German serial killer; in Hindenburg, Upper Silesia (now Zabrze, Poland) (d. 1991).
- Died: Harriet Brooks, 57, Canadian nuclear physicist, from leukemia.

== April 18, 1933 (Tuesday) ==
- In Romania, fascists stormed the Chernivtsi business district, smashing shop windows and attacking Jewish pedestrians. About 100 people, mostly Jews, were injured and 20 arrests were made.
- Born: Carolyn Jones, American actress best known as Morticia Addams on television's The Addams Family; in Amarillo, Texas (d. 1983).

== April 19, 1933 (Wednesday) ==
- President Roosevelt took the United States off the gold standard by ordering that gold exports to other nations be halted. The effect would be to devalue the U.S. dollar by 36% (against gold-backed currencies) over the next eight months. However, the Dow Jones Industrial Average had increased by 55% on July 18.
- Four hundred American citizens of Mexican descent became the first repatriados to move from the United States to "Colony Number 2", near Pinotepa Nacional in Mexico's Oaxaca State. They were joined by several hundred more Mexican-Americans seeking new opportunities during the Great Depression. By February 1934 the population of the colony had dropped from about 700 to only 8 colonists, as the repatriados moved back to the US.
- Les Pawson won the Boston Marathon.
- Born: Jayne Mansfield, American actress (birth name Vera Jayne Palmer); in Bryn Mawr, Pennsylvania (killed in accident 1967).

== April 20, 1933 (Thursday) ==
- Adolf Hitler's 44th birthday was celebrated for the first time as a national holiday, with celebrations across Germany, including parades and special church services in his honor.
- The Soviet Union approved a project for the creation of "labor villages" in western Siberia and in the Kazakh SSR, for the forcible deportation and relocation of up to one million prisoners. Administered by the General Directorate of Camps (commonly known as the Glavnoye upravlyaniya lagyleryey or G.U. Lag.) each colony came to be called a gulag.
- During a visit to the White House, pilot Amelia Earhart, First Lady Eleanor Roosevelt and a group of women reporters went on a nighttime airplane flight over Washington, D.C., and Baltimore.
- British Aviator William Lancaster died in the Sahara Desert eight days after his plane's engine had forced him to make a crash landing. A search for him was unsuccessful, and his remains were not discovered until almost 29 years later, by French Army troops, on February 12, 1962.
- The Longworth House Office Building was completed 10 months after construction began, providing 251 suites and 16 committee rooms for the U.S. House of Representatives. In 1962 the building was named in honor of Nicholas Longworth, who had been Speaker of the House in 1933.
- Died:
  - William Rooke Creswell, 80, "Father of the Royal Australian Navy"
  - William Henry Holmes, 86, American anthropologist and museum curator.

== April 21, 1933 (Friday) ==
- Nazi Germany effectively outlawed the Jewish practice of shechita, the ritual slaughter of animals in the preparation of kosher food. The German law did not refer to the Jewish religion, but required that animals be anesthetized with electric shock or stunned with a special hammer, counter to the Jewish practice.
- John Collier was appointed as Commissioner of the U.S. Bureau of Indian Affairs, and began major reforms in federal government treatment of American Indians. Collier, a former social worker and an anthropologist, reversed the U.S. policy of assimilation of the various cultures, mandating bilingual education in federal Indian schools and changing school curricula to include the teaching of tribal history and traditions.
- In response to the influx of Jewish physicians among refugees who had fled from Nazi Germany, France enacted the Armbruster Law, which limited the practice of medicine to French citizens and subjects who had been granted the diplome d'État by France. Even the most renowned foreign doctors were directed to go through nine years of undergraduate and medical studies, as well as the last year of high school to obtain a baccalaureate, or be arrested for illegal practice of medicine.
- The American airship USS Macon was launched, 17 days after the destruction of its sister ship, USS Akron. The Macon was destroyed in a 1935 crash.
- Rudolf Hess was appointed as the first Deputy Fuehrer of Germany (Stellvertreter des Führers), a ceremonial job with no actual power.

== April 22, 1933 (Saturday) ==
- King Zog of Albania decreed government control over all private schools in that Balkan nation, including the immediate closure of the Roman Catholic schools that had been established by Italian settlers. (Italy invaded and conquered Albania in 1939.)
- Born: Mark Damon, American film distributor and founder of Producers Sales Organization; as Mark Harris, in Chicago. (d. 2024)
- Died: Henry Royce, 70, co-founder, with Charles Rolls of the Rolls-Royce automobile and aviation company.

== April 23, 1933 (Sunday) ==
- Service began on the Electric Trolley Bus (ETB) system in Dayton, Ohio, with buses powered by overhead electric wires rather than by gasoline. By 2012 the Dayton system was one of only five remaining in the United States. The others are in Boston, Philadelphia, San Francisco, and Seattle. The electric trolley buses account for 85% of the mass transportation service in Dayton.

== April 24, 1933 (Monday) ==
- Camp De Priest, the first African-American CCC camp, was established at the Allegheny National Forest.
- Jewish physicians were officially excluded from being paid by Germany's public health insurance system. Soon afterward, private German insurance companies followed suit. By July, half of the Jewish physicians in the nation had given up their practices.
- Persecution of Jehovah's Witnesses in Nazi Germany began with the seizure of the Bible Students' office in Magdeburg.
- Born: Patricia Bosworth, American journalist and biographer; in Oakland, California (d. 2020).
- Died: Felix Adler, 81, founder of the Ethical Culture movement.

== April 25, 1933 (Tuesday) ==
- The "Law Against the Overcrowding of German Schools and Institutions of Higher Learning" (Gesetz gegen die Überfüllung deutscher Schulen und Hochschulen) was issued, limiting the number of Jewish students in public schools to 1.5% of the total enrollment, ostensibly based on the percentage of the German population who were non-Aryan.
- The Soviet salvage ship Russlan sank in an arctic gale off the Norwegian coast, killing all 33 people on board.
- Born:
  - Jerry Leiber, American songwriter and lyricist, who teamed with composer Mike Stoller to create such hits as Hound Dog, Jailhouse Rock, and Love Potion No. 9; Rock & Roll Hall of Fame inductee, 1987; in Baltimore (d. 2011)
  - J. Anthony Lukas, American journalist; in White Plains, New York (d. 1997)
- Died: Franz Nopcsa, 55, Hungarian-born paleontologist and pioneer in the study of paleobiology.

== April 26, 1933 (Wednesday) ==
- The Gestapo (Geheime staatspolizei, literally "Secret State Police") was created by Hermann Göring to control political dissent within the German state of Prussia. On April 20, 1934, it would become the secret police force for all Germany. Historian William Shirer later wrote that "An obscure post office employee who had been asked to furnish a franking stamp for the new bureau ... unwittingly created a name the very mention of which was to inspire terror first within Germany and then without."
- Born:
  - Carol Burnett, American actress, singer, and comedian; in San Antonio, Texas
  - Ilkka Kuusisto, Finnish opera composer; in Helsinki (d. 2025)
  - Arno Allan Penzias, German-born physicist and 1978 Nobel Prize in Physics laureate, who was among a group of Jewish children evacuated to Britain in 1938; in Munich. (d. 2024)

== April 27, 1933 (Thursday) ==
- Karl Guthe Jansky, on what one author described as a date that "is officially considered the beginning of radio astronomy" delivered a lecture at a meeting of the International Scientific Radio Union in Washington, D.C., entitled "Electrical Disturbances of Extra-terrestrial Origin". Jansky, an engineer at Bell Telephone Laboratories in Holmdel, New Jersey, had been investigating interference with radio transmissions at Bell, and discovered radio waves that varied in intensity depending on the time of day and the time of year, but maintained the same frequency, leading to the conclusion that the waves were coming from beyond the Earth, apparently from the center of the Milky Way. Jansky would become famous in a Bell Labs press release that was reported on page one of the New York Times on May 5.
- Following his demonstration of stereophonic sound on April 12, Harvey Fletcher had the Philadelphia Orchestra perform for members of the National Academy of Sciences at Constitution Hall in Washington, D.C. After the lights were turned on, the Washington audience was stunned to see that only one musician was on stage — and that the orchestra had remained in Philadelphia, with its music being carried over telephone lines.
- About 100 farmers in Le Mars, Iowa, kidnapped Judge Charles C. Bradley from the Plymouth County Courthouse after he refused to promise not to sign any further mortgage foreclosures. A group of masked men then blindfolded him, took him outside, drove him out of town, and pulled him from the ground after putting a noose around his neck until he lost consciousness. After being told to pray, Bradley reportedly said "Lord, I pray thee do justice to all men", and the mob disbursed on its own. Iowa Governor Clyde L. Herring then proclaimed martial law in Plymouth County and sent 400 state National Guardsmen to enforce order. After guardsmen arrested more than 100 suspects, a military court of inquiry heard testimony and referred 46 of the group to prosecution at various county courts. Most were given probation.
- The Jessop & Son department store in Nottingham, England, was acquired by the John Lewis Partnership (its first store outside of London).
- Died: Albert Funk, 38, former member of the German Reichstag, was killed at the police station at Recklinghausen, after being thrown from an upstairs window.

== April 28, 1933 (Friday) ==
- The Berlin edition of Deutsche Allgemeine Zeitung published what would prove to be the last newspaper article in Germany that openly criticized the ruling Nazi government. Wolfgang Köhler, a well-respected psychologist and a professor at Humboldt University of Berlin, wrote "Gespräche in Deutschland" ("Conversations in Germany"), denouncing the injustice of the firing of Jewish professionals. Among his comments were that people who refused to join the Nazi Party "feel a moral imposition ... They believe that only the quality of a human being should determine his worth, that intellectual achievement, character, and obvious contributions to German culture retain their significance whether a person is Jewish or not." Köhler fully expected to be arrested for his defiance. Surprisingly, he was allowed to continue teaching, and was allowed to leave Germany in 1935.
- Genrikh Yagoda, a deputy director of the Soviet Union's secret police, expanded the scope of removing newcomers from cities in the USSR. Anyone who had not been issued a "propiska", the Soviet internal passport that became required beginning in January, was relocated. Relocations had started in the eight major Soviet cities on January 5, and Yagoda carried the deportation rule to "all urban and semi-urban areas".
- The drama film Zoo in Budapest starring Loretta Young and Gene Raymond was released.
- Born: Horst Faas, German photojournalist and twice Pulitzer Prize winner; in Berlin (d. 2012)

== April 29, 1933 (Saturday) ==
- The Anglo-Persian Oil Company (later British Petroleum or BP), a British company with a monopoly on the oil fields of Iran, signed a 60-year agreement with the Iranian government. The agreement contained a provision that Iran would not attempt to nationalize the company or unilaterally change the terms. In 1951 an Iranian attempt to nationalize the company led to the CIA-sponsored overthrow of the Iranian government, and a revised agreement favourable to the West. In 1979 the Islamic Republic of Iran canceled the deal entirely, well before its April 29, 1993, expiration date.
- Article 83 of the Constitution of Mexico was amended, changing the President's term from 4 years to 6 years, to serve no more than once.
- Everton defeated Manchester City F.C. 3–0 in the FA Cup Final at Wembley Stadium.
- Born:
  - Willie Nelson, American country-music singer and songwriter; in Abbott, Texas.
  - Mark Eyskens, Prime Minister of Belgium in 1981; in Leuven.
- Died: Constantine P. Cavafy, 70, Greek poet

== April 30, 1933 (Sunday) ==
- Luis M. Sanchez Cerro, the President of Peru, was assassinated by Abelardo Mendoza Leywa at the Santa Beatriz horseracing track, after completing a review of 30,000 troops who were preparing to fight a war against Colombia. Sancho Cerro was struck by two bullets while getting into a car to leave, and died ten minutes later. Reportedly, he had survived so many previous attempts on his life that he had 14 bullets in his body besides the two which killed him. Former President Óscar R. Benavides, who would conclude a peace treaty with Colombia, was selected to succeed Sanchez Cerro.
- Fritz Haber, Director of the Kaiser Wilhelm Institute of Physical Chemistry, resigned in protest over the order to dismiss Jewish members of the faculty from the institute. Although he was Jewish, he was exempt from the order because he was a veteran of World War I.
- The Parliament of Austria held its last session until after World War II. The legislators assembled at 10:35 a.m. in Vienna, voted to enact a new constitution allowing rule by decree, and adjourned at 10:50.
