= Agrolândia =

- Municipality
- Municipality of Agrolândia
- Flag Coat of arms

- Location of Agrolândia

- Location within Brazil
- Coordinates: 27°24′43″S 49°49′33″W
- Country: Brazil
- Region: South
- State: (Santa Catarina (state)) Santa Catarina
- Founded: July 25, 1962

Government
  - Mayor: Gianfranco Mohr (PL)

Area
  - Total: 207.119 km^{2} (79.969 sq mi)
- Elevation: 364 m (1,194 ft)

Population (2020)
  - Total: 11,013
  - Density: 40/km^{2} (100/sq mi)
- Time zone: UTC−3 (BRT)
- CEP: 88420-000
- HDI (2000): 0.775
- Website: www.agrolandia.sc.gov.br

Agrolândia is a Brazilian municipality in the state of Santa Catarina. It is located in the micro-region of Rio do Sul, with agriculture as its main economic activity. It was colonized by the Germans, who are the main ethnic group. The main access to the municipality is through the SC-426 highway, starting from BR-470. There are secondary accesses through Otacílio Costa, going down the mountain on a gravel road. There are also secondary accesses from the municipality of Braço do Trombudo and through Ituporanga via Atalanta.

== Etymology ==
The name Agrolândia was received by the municipality because its economy is based on agriculture, an economic activity in which the inhabitants of the municipal territory are dedicated to this source of income.

== Origins and settlement ==
In 1880, at the time when the Germans began to colonize the region of Rio do Sul, in an expressionless manner, they also began to populate the municipal territory of Agrolândia. It is possible to mention as the first immigrants to live in the region, the pioneers Leopoldo and Oswaldo Zwicker, Atwig Will and the Prochnow family. Initially, Agrolândia was called Trombudo Alto, because its lands are crossed by the Trombudo river. The book "Agrolândia from Trombudo Alto to our times" mentions Agrolândia pioneers Eduard and Johann Will, Otto Zwicker, Wilhelm Kanitz and Otto, Leopold and Bruno Prochnow. And eight years before they arrived in Agrolândia, they had already arrived in Serra dos Alves José Alves da Silveira, Domingos Alves and Ricardo Alves, in 1908. Administrative training and recent history It was elevated to the category of District in 1957. Some years after its elevation to the district, on June 12, 1962, Agrolândia was elevated to the category of municipality, by means of State Law nº 831, with territory that was separated from Central Trombudo. The new municipality was installed on July 25 of the same year. The first mayor who won the first municipal elections was Mr. Adolfo Hedel. The name Agrolândia is the toponym translator of the economic activity that predominated in the municipality, whose inhabitants are dedicated, above all, to farming. Its area is 207,119 km^{2} and is a municipality belonging to the Vale do itajaí region. Currently its economy is based on the metal-mechanic and textile industry.

== The municipality ==
Agrolândia is located in the Alto Vale do Itajaí region. Its main access is BR 470, followed by SC 426. Geographically divided into Centro, Bairro São João, Bairro Três Barras, Bairro Siegel, Bairro Ipiranga and rural communities of Serra dos Alves, Carrapatos, Serra Velha, Ribeirão Garganta, Rio Novo, Ribeirão das Pedras, Rio Bonito, São João Novo, Alto São João, Ribeirão Xaxim, Ribeirão do Tigre, Valada do Tigre, Barra do Tigre and Pitangueira.
