= Malicious Practices Act 1933 =

Law in Nazi Germany

The Malicious Practices Act (Verordnung zur Abwehr heimtückischer Diskreditierung der nationalen Regierung) was passed on March 21, 1933 in Nazi Germany. It was part of a series of events that occurred within 1933, which marked the brutality and resilience of the Nazi party. From here on life for thousands of Germans would be controlled and monitored for those dubbed as ‘social outcasts’. Not only were many killed; others were forced into Nazi concentration camps in order to eradicate opposition to the Nazi Party. The Act in particular portrayed some of the Nazis' key political and philosophical policies.

== Overview ==
The Malicious Practices Act was a measure introduced to rid the German state of its ‘oppressors’ and ‘enemies’.

In particular, the Nazi state imposed new legislation that made it illegal to speak wrongly of, or criticise the regime and its leaders. The two key guidelines were that of Protective Custody and Preventative Custody. Preventative Custody was aimed at the undesirables within society, for example paupers, homosexuals and Jews. Those who were unfortunate enough to fall into this category could be arrested even if an offence had not been committed. Homosexuality was a criminal offense in Weimar and Nazi Germany.

Protective custody, however, was aimed at the regime's political opponents, in particular those from the left, such as the communists and the social democrats. The state made it apparent that those who failed to comply with Nazi ideology and politics could be arrested for the ‘protection of the state’. In particular this was in an attempt to eliminate other political parties from German politics and eradicate their presence permanently. A circular of the Reich and Prussian Minister of Interior, produced on 14 December 1937, stated:

"...those to be considered A-Social are persons who demonstrate through behaviour towards the community, when may not in itself be criminal, that they will not adopt themselves to the community.

"The following are examples of asocial:

"Persons who through minor, but repeated, infractions of the law demonstrate that they will not adapt socialist state, e.g. beggars, tramps, whores, alcoholics with contagious diseases, particularly transmitted diseases, who evade the measures taken by the public health authorities."

== Background ==
After being appointed Chancellor on 30 January 1933, Hitler still faced huge problems. The Nazi party at this time only held a third of all seats in the Reichstag, thus lacking an overall elected majority. As such the Nazis looked at ways to gain support and elections were called for 5 March 1933.

At this point Hermann Göring became one of Hitler's key allies during the period. He was appointed Minister of Interior and sought ways to improve Nazi support. His initial success through bargaining came in the form of donated support from industrialists, who supported the Nazis by providing them with 3 million Reichsmark. Göring was ruthless in his attack on the German state police. He quickly began sacking senior police officers in order to replace them with key Nazi supporters. Alongside this, he infiltrated the police force by recruiting 50,000 members of the SA to work as Auxiliary Police (later to be known as The Gestapo). Their uniformed presence alone gained the support of ordinary Germans who sought change. Nevertheless, their existence brought fear and intimidation amongst the others, something which came to a head on 27 February 1933.

The Reichstag fire, which took place on 27 February 1933, was the perfect pretext for the Nazis to launch an attack on their fiercest rivals, the Communists and other left wing parties. Nonetheless, the Decree that followed, “Decree of the President of the Reich for the Protection of People and State” (otherwise known as The Emergency Decree) prevented the communists and socialists from taking part in the Election campaign. This was pursued through the mass arrests of political party leaders and the closure of party newspapers.

== Specific measures ==
Although there had been a surge of violence and intimidation exerted by the Nazis prior to the passing of the Act, it was by no means as violent and resilient.

Mass arrests were introduced in order to round up members of the socialists and communist parties.

"Around 10,000 Communists and Socialists were arrested in March and April. By June, the numbers in ‘protective custody’-most of the workers- had doubled. A good number of those arrested were the victims of denunciations by neighbours of workmates. So great was the wave of denunciations following the Malicious Practices Act of 21 March 1933 that even the police criticised it."

Homosexuals in particular were hard done by through the act, as they were subject to the implications of both guidelines. Above all, they did not fit into the Nazis ideal for the German race and as such were seen as a direct threat to the Nazi's policy of Gleichschaltung.

== Consequences ==
On 22 March 1933; Dachau concentration camp was officially opened.

Yet time has shown that conditions within concentration camps were harsh, dangerous and eventually, murderous.

The Nuremberg laws were also introduced to stamp out any Jewish presence. Passed in 1935 at the annual party rally, the laws had two basic aims. Firstly the law for the protection of German blood and German honour was passed, which prohibited marriage and extra-marital intercourse between Jews and Germans. Secondly, the Reich Citizenship Law was also passed, which stripped Jews of their citizenship. However, anti-Jewish prejudice and violence did not end here, with events radicalising during Kristallnacht on 10 November 1938.

Finally, the passing of the Enabling Law would have been fairly impossible without the Malicious Practices Act. As the SA and SS had surrounded the representative buildings no elected officials were able to vote other than the Nazis and their supporters. As such the Act was passed with ease and consequently this gave Hitler complete dictatorial powers, hence beginning the radicalisation and implementation of total Nazi rule.

== See also ==
- Espionage Act of 1917, Subversive Activities Control Act 1950 (US)
- Inciting subversion of state power (China)
- Article 58 (RSFSR Penal Code) (Soviet Russia)
