= Women in early radio =

Although they often faced obstacles and policy limitations, beginning in the early 1900s a few women were able to participate in the pioneering development of radio communication.

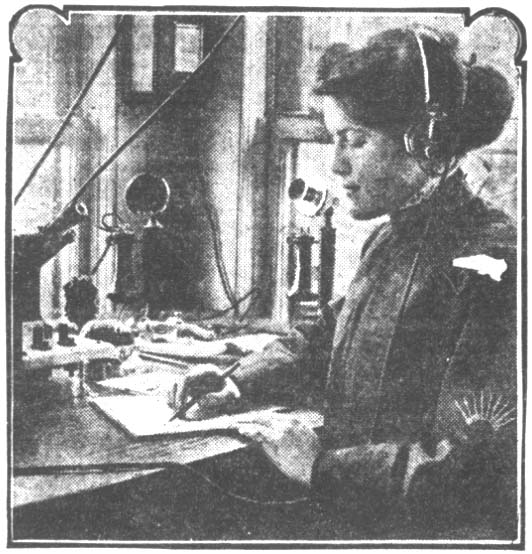
Anna Nevins began working for United Wireless in 1906, and is shown here at the station atop the Waldorf-Astoria Hotel in New York City in 1909.

== Women as wireless operators ==
Beginning in the late 1840s, women were employed as landline telegraph operators, sending and receiving Morse code messages. Early radio communication, then called "wireless telegraphy", was developed in the late 1800s, and also initially communicated using Morse code. Women were employed as some of the earliest wireless operators, and in early 1901 the announcement of the inauguration of a Hawaiian inter-island overland system noted that four of the fourteen operators were women. In 1906, Anna Nevins, who had been a landline telegrapher for Western Union, began work as a wireless operator for Lee de Forest's station "NY", located at 42 Broadway in New York City. She was later employed at the United Wireless Waldorf-Astoria Hotel station in New York City. Nevis left the profession after she married "NY" station manager H. J. Hughes in July 1910.

== Early female shipboard operators ==
Early Female Maritime Radio Operators

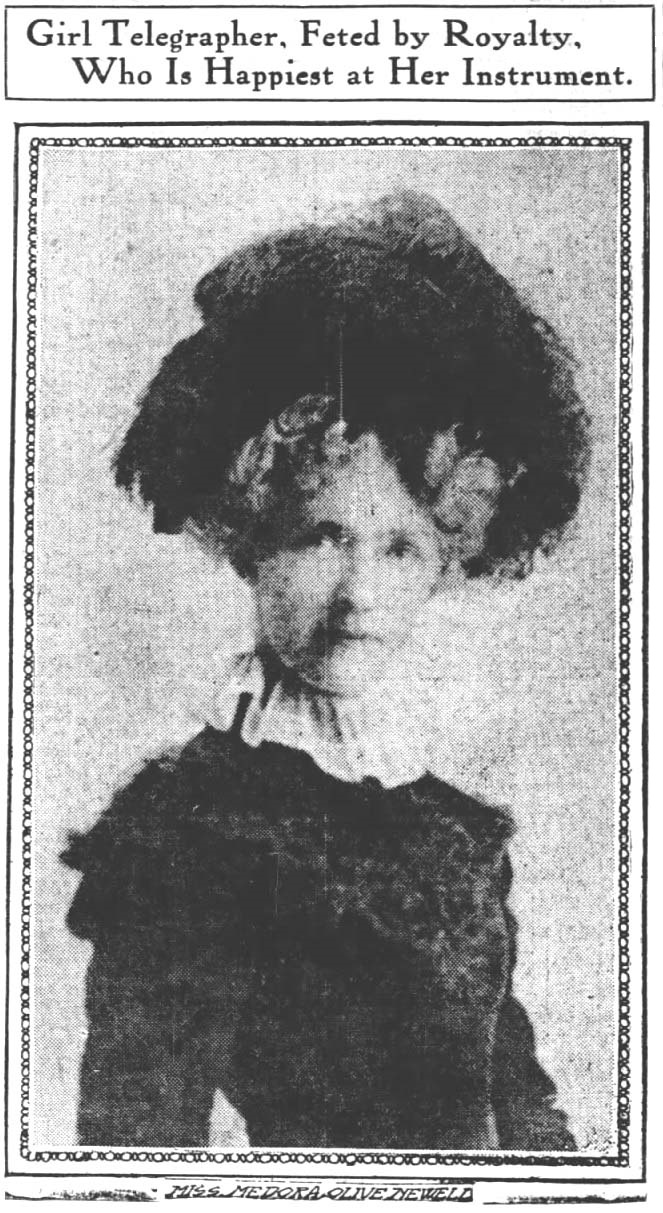
Medora Olive Newell, filled in as an operator on a trans-Atlantic voyage in 1904.

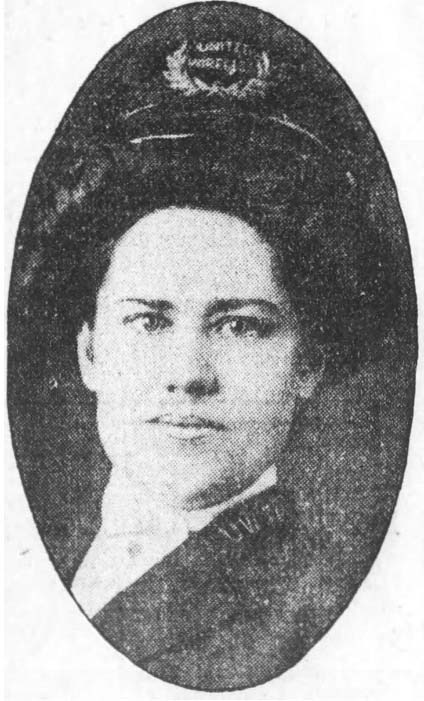
Annie Tucker was a United Wireless operator on daily Tacoma-Seattle, Washington Puget Sound runs in 1908-1909.

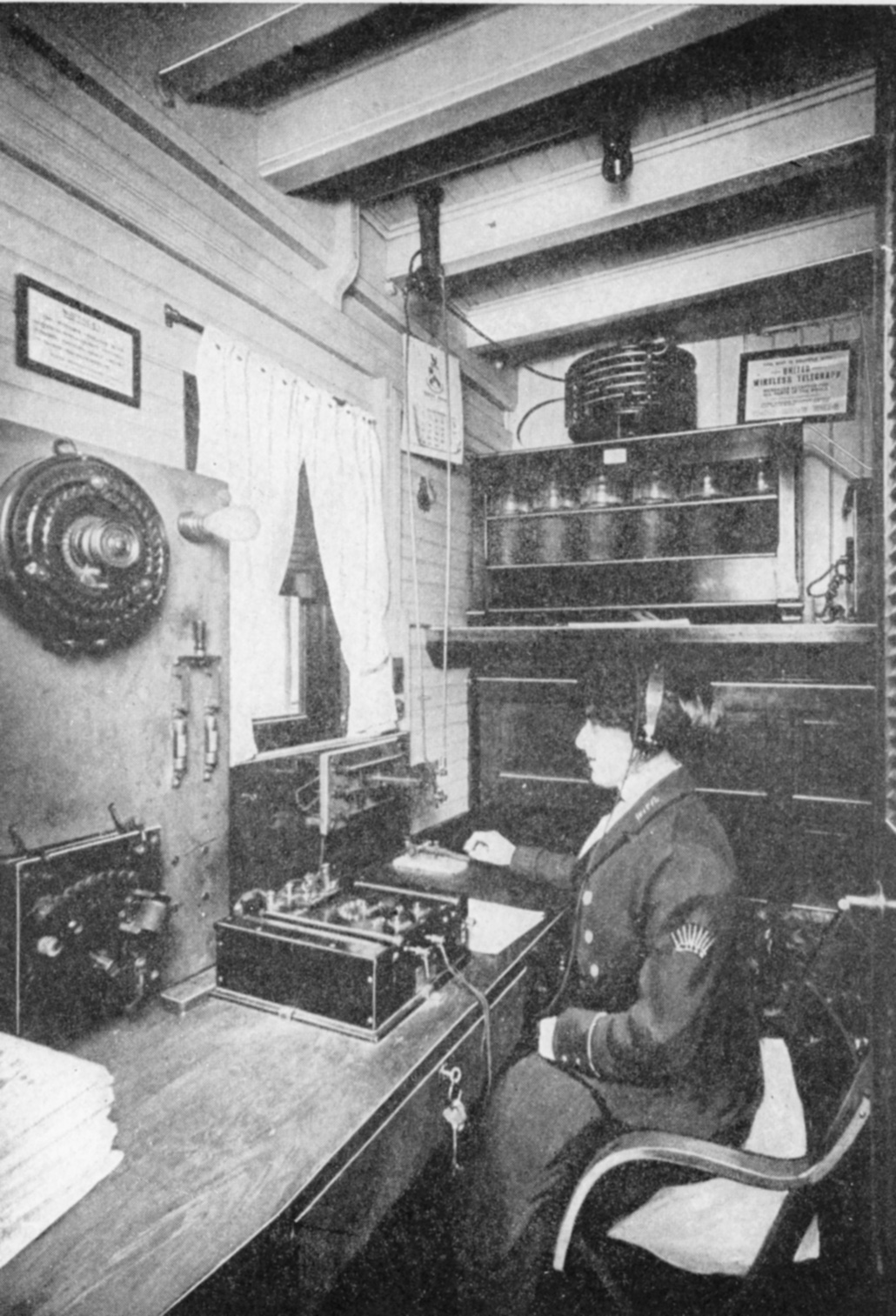
Graynella Packer, United Wireless operator, aboard the Mohawk along the U.S. Atlantic seaboard in 1910.

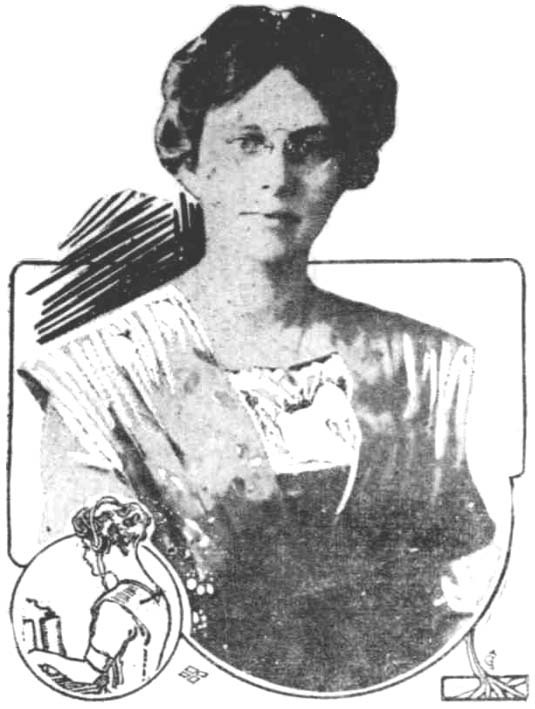
Mabelle Kelso served as a United Wireless operator in the northeastern Pacific for a few months in 1912.

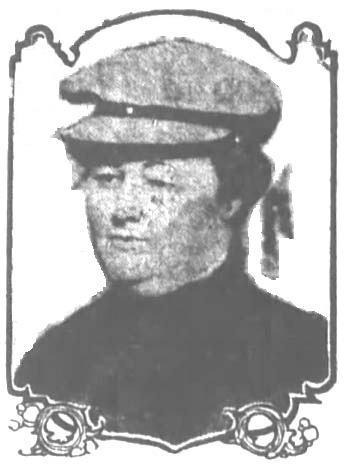
In 1912-1913, the wife of Captain Horace E. Soule of the Windber became the first female operator to work in both the Atlantic and Pacific oceans.

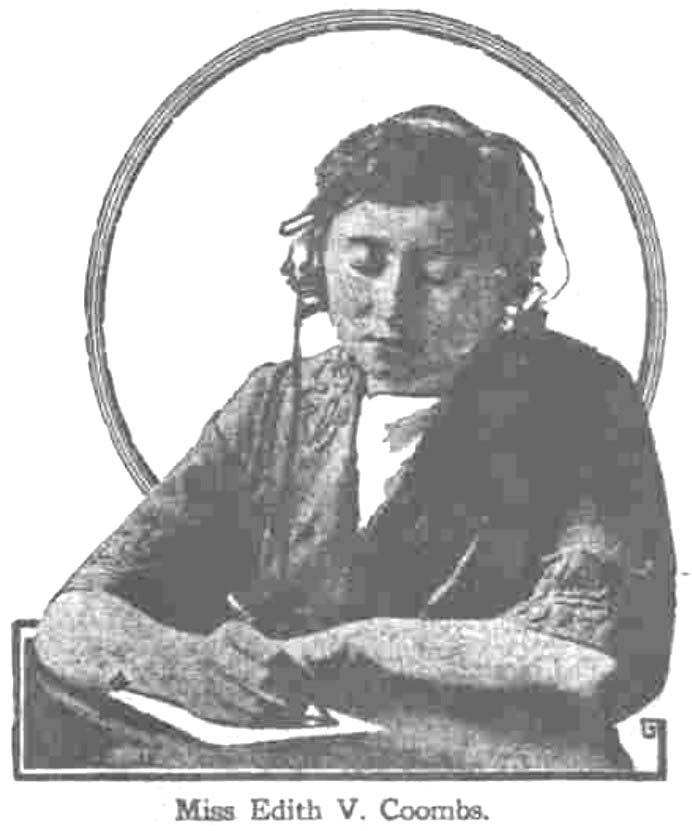
Edith Coombs served in the eastern Pacific for a few months beginning in the fall of 1912.

One of the earliest applications of wireless telegraphy was communication between ships and land stations. While early ship operators were almost exclusively male, a few women entered the field as well. The primary requirements were a knowledge of telegraphic code, which many female landline telegraph operators already possessed, and equipment operation and repair, which generally required additional training.

In the United States, prior to 1910 there was no government regulation of radio communication. The passage of the Wireless Ship Act of 1910 required many U.S. ships to be equipped with radio equipment for the first time. It also required certified operators on board, capable of sending and receiving messages. With the passage of the Radio Act of 1912, the certification program was replaced by operator licenses.

=== Medora Olive Newell ===
Perhaps the earliest woman to operate on shipboard was Medora Olive Newell, an experienced landline telegrapher who began working as an operator in Durango, Iowa in 1886 at the age of fourteen, and in 1897 moved to Chicago and became a commercial operator for the Postal Telegraph Company. Newell's pay as a first-class landline operator enabled her to live a fairly affluent lifestyle; as Telegraph Age reported in 1909, "Miss Newell has been in the habit of spending her vacations abroad, and has always made these trips the occasion for investigating telegraph and railway management and operation in European countries."

In 1904, she was a passenger aboard the Cunard liner Slavonia on a return voyage from Europe, together with members of The Hague Peace Commission, who were on their way to the United States to persuade President Theodore Roosevelt to call another international conference to continue the work begun at The Hague in 1899. The Hungarian members of the delegation wished to send a birthday greeting back to Emperor Franz Josef of Austria-Hungary, but the ship's operator was unable to send the message. Newell, who, according to Telegraph Age, "had a good working knowledge of wireless", took her place at the key and soon had successfully transmitted the message. The grateful delegates thanked her for her assistance, and the secretary of the Hungarian parliament invited her to visit Hungary as the guest of the nation.

=== Annie Tucker ===
The first woman known to have worked professionally as a maritime radio operator was Annie Tucker, beginning in October 1908 aboard the Indianapolis, which made four trips daily on Puget Sound between Tacoma and Seattle, Washington. Tucker originally worked at Western Union offices in Portland, Oregon and Seattle, Washington, initially as a bookkeeper, where she learned to send and receive Morse code. Eventually she and her husband, Robert H. Tucker, trained themselves in radiotelegraphy. The couple relocated to Tacoma, Washington, where Robert Tucker became the manager of the local United Wireless Telegraph Company station. Annie Tucker was given the Indianapolis assignment after working at a series of land stations along the Pacific coast. In early 1909, she was quoted as saying that, as the ship's sole operator, her workday was from 6 a.m. to 11 p.m., and instead of returning to her Tacoma home she often bunked overnight on the Indianapolis. However, her maritime work ended in April 1909, when she was reassigned to the United Wireless land station at Council Crest, Oregon.

=== Graynella Packer ===
The first woman known to have worked on a vessel on the open ocean, and on overnight voyages, was Graynella Packer (also known as "A. Graynella Packer"). She was born around 1888 in Philadelphia, Pennsylvania, and in her teens her family moved to Jacksonville, Florida. While attending Sutherland College there, she took technical courses and learned Morse code as a way to communicate with classmates. After Packer finished college studies, she decided to go into landline telegraphy, and was employed for two years as the manager of the Sanford, Florida office of the Postal Telegraph Company. During voyages to New York City she became interested in the ship's radiotelegraph equipment, and made arrangements with United Wireless to be trained for a shipboard position.

On November 29, 1910, the Mohawk set off from New York City with Packer on board for the first time, on a regular run to Charleston, South Carolina and Jacksonville. Many of the early press accounts stated that she was 22 years old, however she later was quoted as saying "I don't know how the reporters ever came to say I was 22 years of age and I don't think I will tell you exactly how old I am." Although initially accepted by the company's male operators, she eventually met with conflicts, in part out of concern that, as had happened in landline telegraphy, use of female operators would lead to job losses and lower wages. Therefore, she left in April 1911.

In 1918 Packer published an instruction manual titled "Rhythmic Telegraphy". She later received a law degree, and in 1933 was admitted to practice before the U.S. Supreme court.

=== Mabelle Kelso ===
Mabelle (also spelled "Mabel") Kelso, was born on October 10, 1883, in Pennsylvania, and got her start as a stenographer for a Washington lumber company. In 1908, she began studying Morse code at Pittsburgh Technical College, and after graduation was hired by Western Union and the Postal Telegraph Company as a landline telegrapher. In early 1912, she began training, under the supervision of R. H. Armstrong, manager of the Seattle office of the United Wireless Telegraph Company, to become a maritime radio operator. On June 6, 1912, she was the first woman issued a "Certificate of Skill in Radiocommunication" under the provisions of the Wireless Ship Act of 1910, qualifying her to work as a maritime operator.

Kelso was hired by United Wireless, and effective July 1 assigned to the S.S. Mariposa, a steamship which traveled between ports at Seattle and in Alaska. Her appointment generated some opposition from members of Congress who wished to bar women from holding such positions on seagoing ships; however, she received support from the Pacific Coast Wireless Inspector of United Wireless, who stated that "he knew of no law which would bar Miss Kelso from her position".

In 1912 United Wireless went bankrupt, and its assets were taken over by the Marconi Wireless Telegraph Company of America. R. H. Sawler, the new head of the Seattle office, soon discharged Kelso from shipboard duties, stating that "it was against the policy of the company to employ women operators". She was transferred to a shore station where she performed menial clerical duties, including keeping the books and transmitting from the shore station to the downtown office over a "buzzer" telegraph line. She quit to pursue a higher paid stenographers job. Under her married name of Mabelle Kelso Shaw, she became a Doctor of Chiropractic beginning in 1924.

=== Mrs. Horace E. Soule ===
In May 1912, Pacific American Fisheries purchased the Windber, then located in Philadelphia, primarily to be used by the company's Alaska canneries. Because it was planned to also carry passengers, the ship had to be fitted with a radio transmitter in order to meet U.S. government regulations. Captain Horace E. Soule's wife normally traveled aboard the ship, so she completed American Marconi's three month wireless school program and received a first-class operator's license. The Windber left New York City on August 2, 1912, arriving 84 days later in San Francisco. During this journey Mrs. Soule acted as the ship's purser and wireless operator, although the radio equipment, installed in New York, failed while along the Atlantic coast of South America. In San Francisco the ship was put into drydock for refitting, and in late January 1913 arrived at company headquarters in Bellingham, Washington to begin the Bellingham/Alaska runs. Thus, Mrs. Soule became the first woman to act as a maritime radio operator on both the Atlantic and the Pacific oceans.

=== Edith Coombs ===
Edith Coombs began working aboard the North Pacific liner Roanoke, based in San Francisco, on September 17, 1912, just after turning 18 years old. The ship's routes were along the eastern Pacific coast, from San Francisco to Portland and Astoria, Oregon. Coombs had initially worked in the U.S government's Radio Inspection office in San Francisco as a stenographer, and had been personally trained by the local Radio Inspector, R. Y. Cadmus. However, in early 1913 she was removed from maritime duties and reposted to a land station.

(In 1918, a reference in the Marconi Service News identified the pioneer Roanoke operator as "Mrs. Sickles".)

=== Later developments ===
There was a brief period where it appeared that opportunities were expanding for women to work as maritime radio operators, including a 1911 report that "As a result of the daily service of the Clyde line and the need of additional operators it is expected that several other women will be employed in the near future." However, one young woman, inspired by Graynella Packer, found that, despite meeting all the requirements for a similar posting, many obstacles remained, and concluded that "lady radio operators were no longer fashionable".

There had been a long naval tradition that, in cases of emergency, women had priority in evacuating distressed ships, while others suggested that women didn't have the temperament needed to effectively respond to an emergency. When this was brought up, however, the female operators forcefully insisted that they would be fully professional and reliable during any crisis. In July 1912, addressing a proposed federal radio law, the New York branch of the Commercial Telegraphers' Union of America complained that the legislation "failed to bar against the employment of women as wireless telegraphers". In addition, an American Marconi official was quoted as saying that there were conditions under which work as a wireless telegrapher might be undesirable occupation for a woman.

In early 1913, U.S. Radio Inspector R. B. Wolverton declared that "women wireless operators will not be acceptable at sea", despite the fact that more than thirty women had passed the examinations needed to qualify. A 1918 review in the Marconi Service News was not aware of any subsequent female maritime radio operators until December 1917, when Elizabeth Langsdale Du Val was assigned as the junior operator on the Howard, sailing along the Atlantic coast. However, in his 1935 book SOS To The Rescue, Karl Baarslag reported that in 1913 Margaret King had briefly served as an operator on the Eastland on the U.S. Great Lakes.

== Women as radio amateurs ==
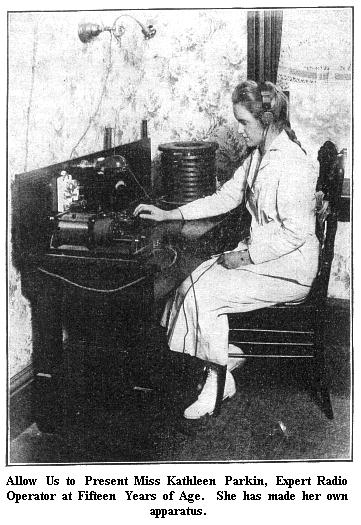
Gladys Kathleen Parkin in 1915, operating her home-built amateur station 6SO.

Amateur radio became a popular hobby in the early years of the twentieth century, and many hobbyists built their own transmitting and receiving equipment. Informally known collectively as "hams", use of the term "YL" ("young lady") to refer to individual female amateur operators, in contrast to "OM" ("old man") for males, was adopted by the American Radio Relay League in 1920. Some of the earliest women radio enthusiasts were Mrs. M. J. Glass of San Jose, California, who participated in the operation of station FNFN in 1910, and Olive Heartberg, who operated amateur station OHK in New York City in the same year. M. S. Colville, of Bowmanville, Ontario, who began to operate as XDD in 1914, was one of the earliest Canadian female operators.

Because all early radio work was done in Morse code, and individual operators were commonly identified by short call signs, it was possible to remain anonymous if desired. Even after the Radio Act of 1912 required United States radio stations to be licensed, in some cases transmitters were registered under a brother's name, in order to disguise the fact that the main operator was female.

Gladys Kathleen Parkin (September 27, 1901 - August 3, 1990) was one of the early women to obtain a government issued license. In 1916, while a fifteen-year-old high school student at the Dominican College in San Rafael, California, she constructed her own amateur station, 6SO. and obtained a first class commercial radio operators' license. Parkin was quoted in 1916 as saying: "With reference to my ideas about the wireless profession as a vocation or worthwhile hobby for women, I think wireless telegraphy is a most fascinating study, and one which could very easily be taken up by girls, as it is a great deal more interesting than the telephone and telegraph work, in which so many girls are now employed. I am only fifteen, and I learned the code several years ago, by practising a few minutes each day on a buzzer. I studied a good deal and I found it quite easy to obtain my first grade commercial government license, last April. It seems to me that every one should at least know the code, as cases might easily arise of a ship in distress, where the operators might be incapacitated, and a knowledge of the code might be the means of saving the ship and the lives of the passengers. But the interest in wireless does not end in the knowledge of the code. You can gradually learn to make all your own instruments, as I have done with my 1/4 kilowatt set. There is always more ahead of you, as wireless telegraphy is still in its infancy."

== World War I and women as radio operators ==
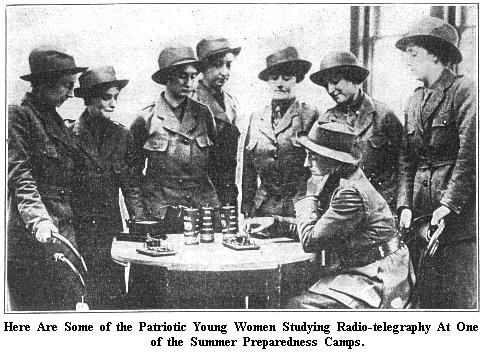
Naval reservists training as wireless operators, 1916

As the U.S. prepared to enter World War I, the Navy Department began a program to train women as radio operators who could be called into action in the event of war. The Girls' Division of the United States Junior Naval Reserve established training camps at the Martha Washington Post, in Edgewater, New Jersey, and the Betsy Ross Post, at Bay Ridge, Brooklyn, where young women were trained to become wireless operators.

In January 1917, in the United States the National League for Women's Service (NLWS) was created from the Woman's Department of the National Civic Federation readiness and relief activities and modelled on similar groups in Britain and elsewhere. The League was divided into thirteen national divisions, one of which was "Wireless and Telegraphy". When the US entered the war in April 1917, the NLWS established training program for female wireless operators at Hunter College in New York. Although they were not strictly government employees, these female wireless operators were allowed to transmit in order to help the war effort.

Abby Putman Morrison, from Hunter College's wireless class, became the first woman to work for the U.S. Navy as an electrician, when she was admitted as an Electrician, 1st Class.

== Women as broadcast radio engineers ==
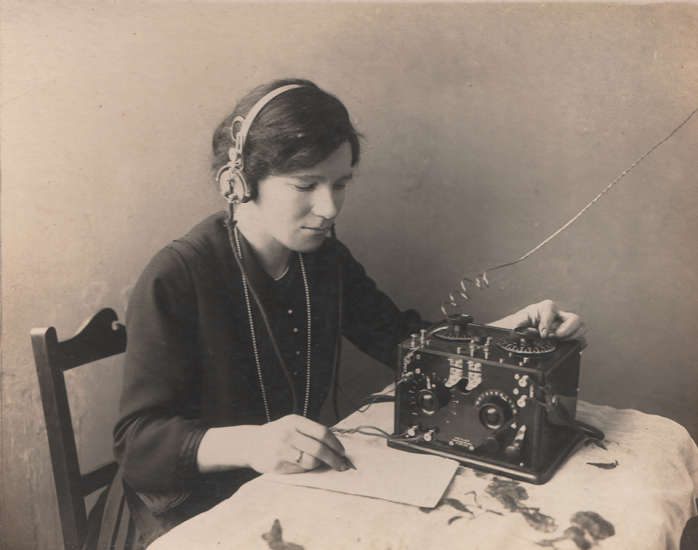
Florence Violet McKenzie Australia's first female electrical engineer, circa 1922

By 1920, the technology had evolved to the point where voice and music could be transmitted as well as Morse telegraphy, and several radio stations began to broadcast regular programs of music and news. In 1920, Eunice Randall (1898-1982), an employee of The American Radio and Research Company, or AMRAD, became an engineer and announcer for the AMRAD radio station, 1XE. Her interest in radio had begun at the age of nineteen, when she built her own amateur radio equipment and operated with the call sign 1CDP. In addition to her technical duties at 1XE, which included repairing equipment and occasionally climbing the transmitting tower, she read stories for children as "The Story Lady," and gave the police report over the air. In 1922, the AMRAD station received a broadcasting station license with the call sign WGI. Randall remained as engineer and assistant chief announcer until 1925, when the company went bankrupt and the station was taken off the air. However, she continued to work as an engineer and drafter, and resumed her amateur radio activities under the call sign of W1MPP.

Florence Violet Mackenzie OBE (1890–1982), Australia's first female electrical engineer, founded the Women's Emergency Signalling Corps (WESC) and trained thousands of service personnel in her Sydney signal instruction school. She later corresponded with Albert Einstein.
