= Mabelle Kelso =

First woman in the United States to hold a government radio operator certificate

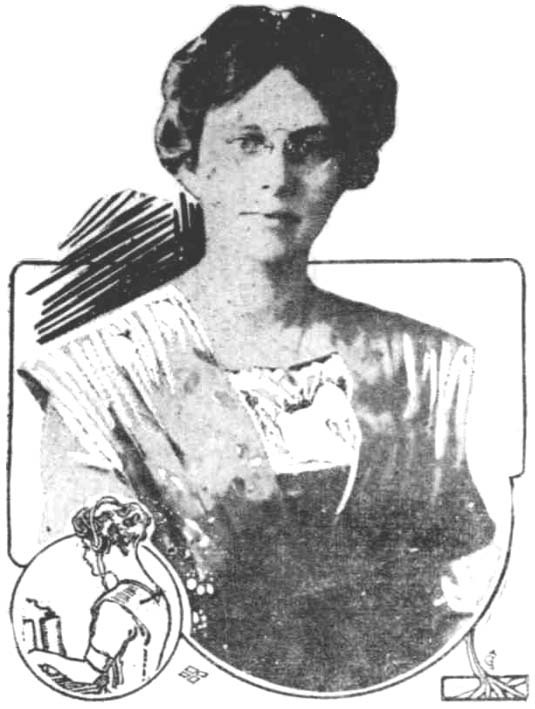
- Kelso in 1912
- Born: October 10, 1883; Pennsylvania, USA
- Died: July 9, 1975 (aged 91); Los Angeles, California, USA
- Spouse: Lt. James Shaw

Mabelle Kelso (October 10, 1883 – July 9, 1975), was an American who in 1912 became one of the earliest female maritime radiotelegraph (wireless) operators. She was also the first woman to be issued a radio operator's certificate by the United States government under the provisions of the Wireless Ship Act of 1910. Under her married name of Mabelle Kelso Shaw, she became a Doctor of Chiropractic beginning in 1924.

== Early life ==
Mabelle (also spelled "Mabel") Kelso was born on October 10, 1883, in Pennsylvania. She got her start as a stenographer for a Washington lumber company. In 1908, she began studying Morse code at Pittsburgh Technical College, and after graduation was hired by Western Union and the Postal Telegraph Company as a landline telegrapher.

== Career as wireless operator ==
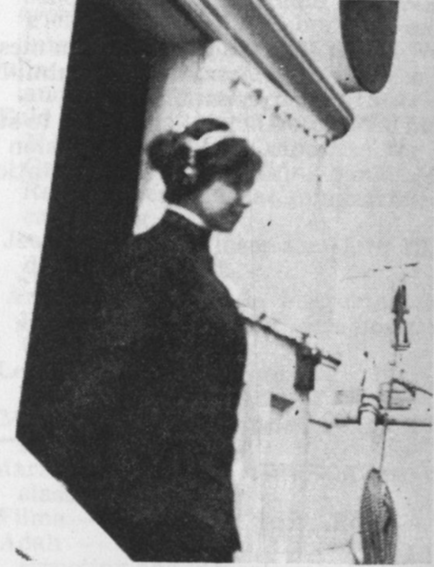
Kelso wearing headphones outside the radio room aboard the S.S. Mariposa, on which she was radio operator during the summer of 1912.

In early 1912, it was announced that R. H. Armstrong, manager of the Seattle office of the United Wireless Telegraph Company, had arranged for training two women, including Kelso, to become maritime radio operators. Studies included learning Continental telegraphic code, used for international shipping, and how to make minor repairs to the equipment. On June 6, 1912, Kelso was the first woman issued a "Certificate of Skill in Radiocommunication" under the provisions of the Wireless Ship Act of 1910, qualifying her to work as a maritime operator. Navy Lieutenant A. C. Call, who administered her examination at Bremerton Navy Yard in Seattle, was quoted as saying that she had passed with the highest mark of any applicant for a certificate who had ever appeared before him.

Kelso was hired by United Wireless, and effective July 1 assigned to the S.S. Mariposa, a steamship which traveled between ports at Seattle and in Alaska. Her appointment generated some opposition from members of Congress who wished to bar women from holding such positions on seagoing ships; however, she received support from the Pacific Coast Wireless Inspector of United Wireless, who stated that "he knew of no law which would bar Miss Kelso from her position".

In 1912 United Wireless went bankrupt, and its assets were taken over by the Marconi Wireless Telegraph Company of America. R. H. Sawler, the new head of the Seattle office, soon discharged Kelso from shipboard duties, stating that "it was against the policy of the company to employ women operators". Other accounts of the dismissal claimed that this action was due to an objection by the federal government's Department of Commerce and Labor. However, the department quickly denied any involvement, stating that there was no prohibition or women serving as marine operators, with government regulations explicitly stating that "Women are eligible as applicants for licenses of any class or grade upon the same conditions as men."

Kelso was transferred to a shore station where she performed menial clerical duties, including keeping the books and transmitting from the shore station to the downtown office over a "buzzer" telegraph line. The passage of the Radio Act of 1912 meant that all previously issued operators certificates were voided, and operators now had to pass a standardized exam and qualify for a 1st, 2nd, or 3rd grade operating license. Kelso returned to the Bremerton Navy Yard and was issued a 1st grade license in February 1913.

== Later career and life ==
Kelso quit to pursue a higher paid stenographers job, and on March 28, 1917, married Lt. James E. Shaw. In May 1924 she was valedictorian of the seven graduates in the first class of the Golden State College of Chiropractic, and later received a naturopathic doctorate. As Dr. Mabelle Kelso Shaw she became a faculty member of the College of Chiropractic Physicians and Surgeons of Los Angeles.

== See also ==
- Women in early radio#Early female shipboard operators
