= SS Mohawk (1908) =

Coordinates: 39°00′08″N 75°12′24″W

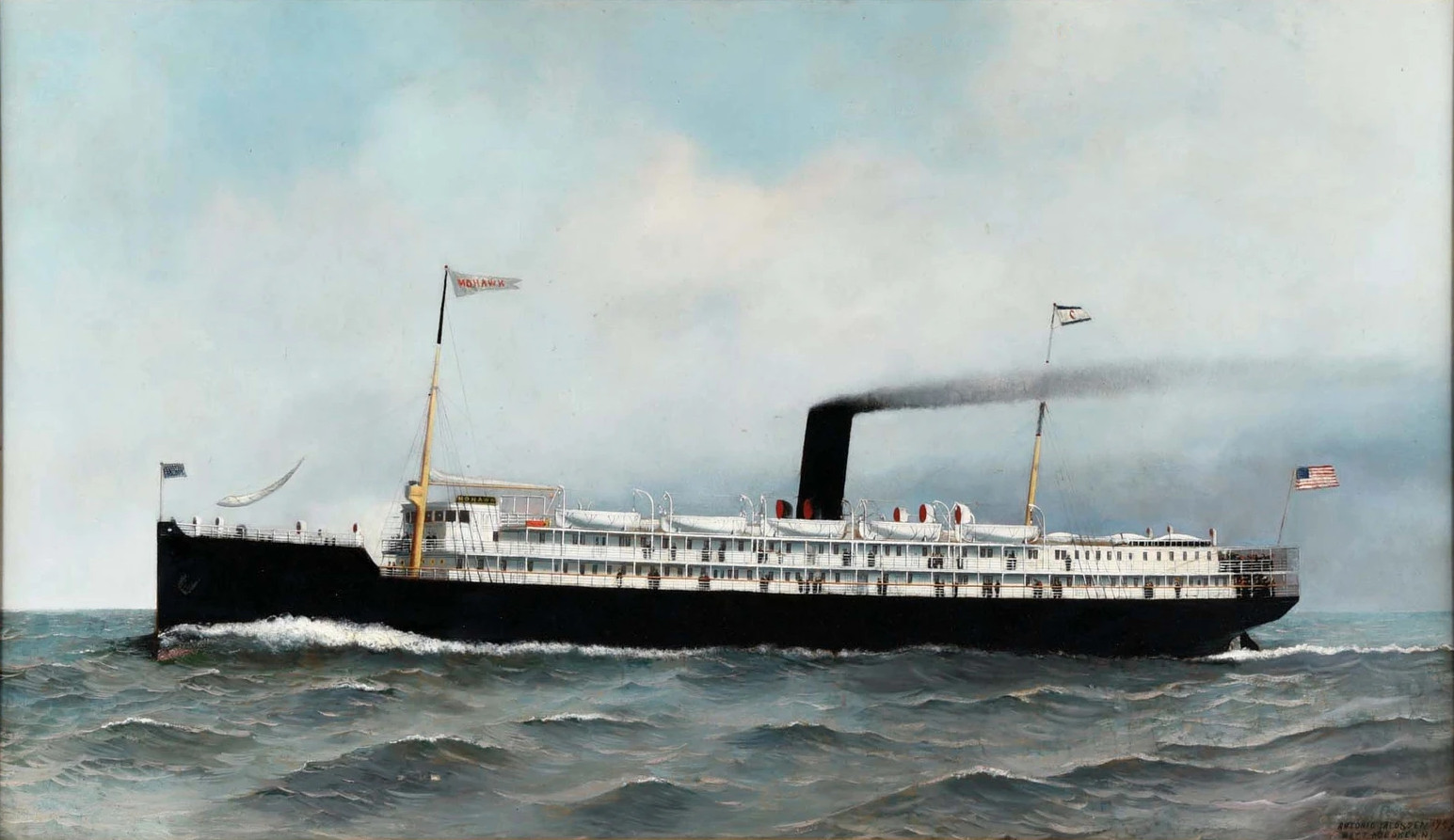
- Painting of Mohawk by Antonio Jacobsen

History

United States
- Name: Mohawk
- Namesake: Mohawk
- Owner: Clyde Steamship Co.
- Builder: William Cramp & Sons, Philadelphia
- Cost: US$650,000
- Yard number: 349
- Launched: 28 July 1908
- Sponsored by: Mrs. J.S. Raymond
- Commissioned: 4 November 1908
- Maiden voyage: 7 November 1908
- Home port: New York
- Identification: US Official Number 205729; Call sign KWRL
- Fate: Fire, 2 January 1925

General characteristics
- Type: Passenger Ship
- Tonnage: 4,623 GRT; 3,475 NRT
- Length: 367.0 ft (111.9 m)
- Beam: 48.3 ft (14.7 m)
- Depth: 20.4 ft (6.2 m)
- Installed power: 336 Nhp
- Propulsion: William Cramp & Sons 3-cylinder triple expansion
- Speed: 14.0 knots (16.1 mph; 25.9 km/h)
- Capacity: 275 cabin passengers; 60 steerage passengers

Mohawk was a steam passenger ship built in 1908 by William Cramp & Sons of Philadelphia for Clyde Steamship Company with intention of operating between New England and southern ports of the United States. In early January 1925 the ship caught fire off New Jersey coast and eventually was abandoned and scuttled by the crew without a loss of life.

== Design and construction ==
In 1907 Clyde Steamship Co. following an expansion of their business decided to increase the number of sailings between New York and southern ports of Charleston and Jacksonville to four per week. The majority of steamers operating on the route were of cargo type, and the company felt the need to order one new steamer to serve mainly as a passenger carrier between the ports. At the time of her construction Mohawk was the largest and finest ship ever built for the Clyde Line and was laid down at the William Cramp & Sons' Kensington Yard in Philadelphia (yard number 349) and launched on 28 July 1908, with Mrs. J.S. Raymond, wife of the treasurer and assistant general manager of Clyde Steamship Company, serving as the sponsor. The ship was primarily designed for passenger transportation and in addition to two decks, also had a hurricane or sun deck constructed on top. The vessel provided accommodations in single cabins or suites for 275 cabin and 60 steerage passengers, and had all the staterooms and saloons located on the upper decks. In addition, a café, and a spacious dining hall with a capacity to seat 110 people simultaneously, and open 24 hours a day, were built. A lounge, a reading room, a musical room, and smoking rooms were also constructed to provide entertainment for the would be passengers. Mohawk had electric lights in cabins and along the decks, and was also equipped with wireless of Marconi type. The vessel had also all the modern machinery fitted for quick loading and unloading of the cargo, including a large number of derricks.

As built, the ship was 367.0 feet (111.9 m) long (between perpendiculars) and 48.3 feet (14.7 m) abeam, and had a depth of 20.4 feet (6.2 m). Originally, Mohawk was assessed at 4,623 GRT and 3,475 NRT. The vessel had a steel hull, and a single 336 nhp triple-expansion steam engine, with cylinders of 27 1/2-inch (70 cm), 46-inch (120 cm) and 72-inch (180 cm) diameter with a 42-inch (110 cm) stroke, that drove a single screw propeller, and moved the ship at up to 14.0 knots (16.1 mph; 25.9 km/h).

Following an inspection and the successful completion of sea trials, the steamer was transferred to her owners and departed for New York on November 4.

== Operational history ==
Upon delivery Mohawk sailed from Philadelphia for New York on November 4, 1908. After taking on board a full complement of passengers, she departed on her maiden voyage on November 7 for Charleston and Jacksonville. The ship departed Jacksonville for her return trip on November 12, and arrived at New York on November 15, thus ending her maiden voyage.

Mohawk continued serving the same route for the rest of her career, connecting Charleston and Jacksonville with Boston and New York, with occasional stops at Brunswick. The steamer carried a variety of general cargo from the southern ports, mostly lumber, cotton, naval stores, vegetables and fruit.

On December 3, 1909 Mohawk ran aground in St. John's River just outside Jacksonville. She was soon refloated with the help of tugs and were able to continue her journey.

The steamer came to the rescue of other vessels in distress on more than one occasion. In December 1909 Mohawk and Mallory Line steamer San Marcos rushed to the aid of another Clyde Line steamship Iroquois who lost her rudder in a gale off the Frying Pan Shoals. Mohawk stood by until two sea going tugs arrived and took the disabled steamer in tow. On January 15, 1910 while anchored at the entrance to St. John's River, the steamer's crew witnessed steamship Chatham striking a jetty and opening a hole in her bow. Mohawk sent a C.Q.D. distress signal informing the city of the accident and then went by the sinking ship to take aboard all of her crew, passengers and their baggage and then safely landing them at Jacksonville. On August 30, 1911 the steamer rescued the ten men crew of the schooner Malcolm B. Seavey which ran aground on a sandbar off Cape Romain and eventually sank in 6 fathoms (36 ft) of water on August 27 during Charleston-Savannah hurricane. The steamer again rushed to help on February 15, 1916 when she stumbled upon a rowboat carrying four crewmen of two lumber carrying barges that got separated from their tug in a gale off Cape Hatteras two days earlier and safely brought them to New York.

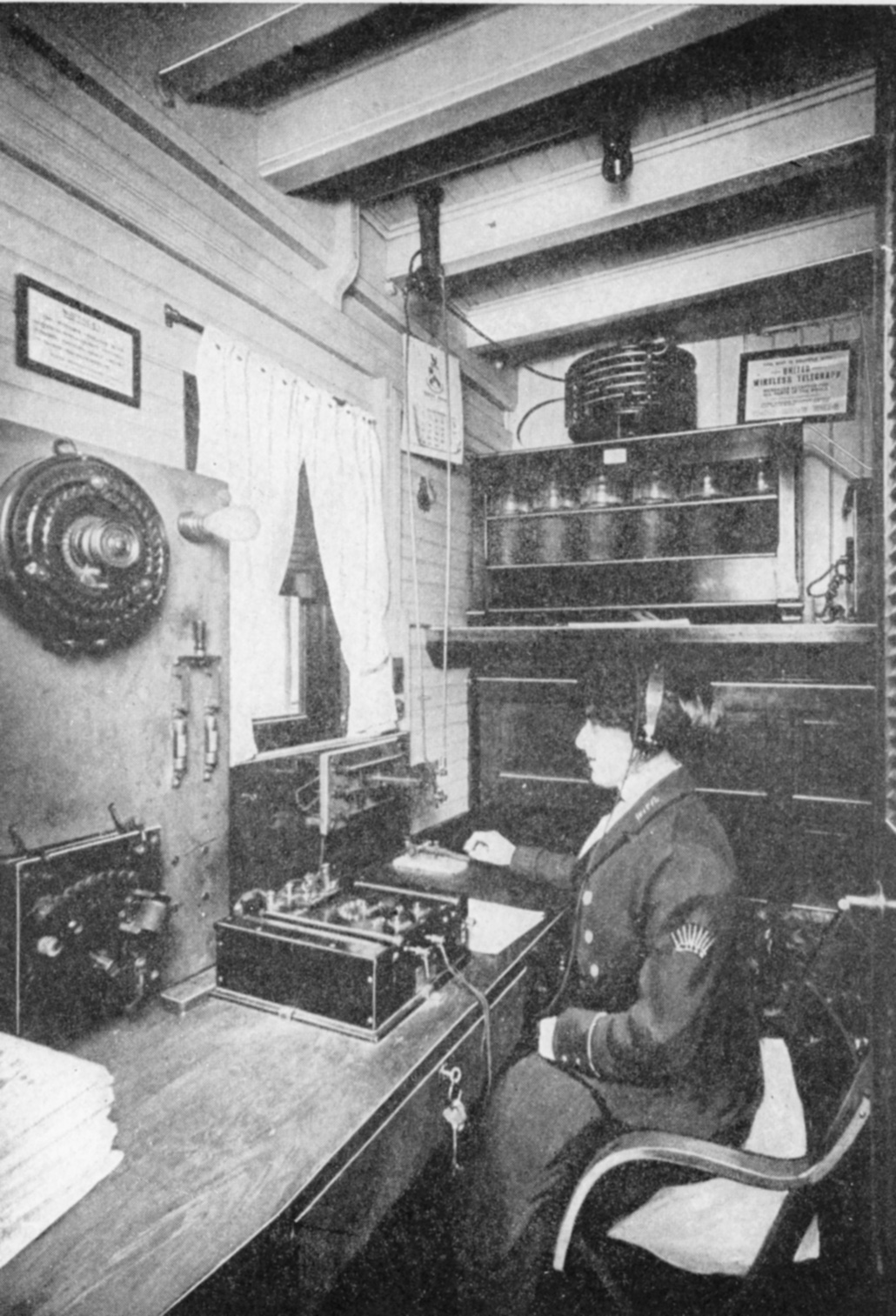
Graynella Packer aboard Mohawk in 1910

In November 1910, Mohawk made history by using the first female shipboard wireless operator to make overnight ocean-going runs, 22-year-old Graynella Packer of Jacksonville. Packer, who was manager of the telegraph station in Sanford prior to her hiring, was employed as a wireless operator for the United Wireless Telegraph Company aboard the steamship from November 1910 to April 1911.

In June 1911 Mohawk was borrowed by Mallory Line to carry a group of 226 Shriners of Texas who chartered the vessel to transport them to New York and from there by rail to Rochester to participate in the Shriner's Supreme Council. The vessel departed Galveston on July 2 and after calling at Havana on July 5 arrived at New York on July 8. Following that trip Mohawk transported a large group of Mallory-Clyde agents and officials from the southern states to New York to participate in the conference being held there.

On November 12, 1914 Mohawk's deck turned into a murder scene as George Batchelor Perkins, a well-known interior decorator and designer from Boston, and M.I.T. graduate, shot and killed F.W.R. Hinman, a business manager for The Florida Times-Union, and wounded captain Andrew D. Ingram of Mohawk and another passenger before being overpowered by stewards and other passengers. Perkins apparently suffered from sleeplessness and appeared to be acting in a dazzled state possibly due to taking several doses of prescribed opiate medication prior to the incident.

In September 1916 it was reported that Mohawk was scheduled to go into drydock in New York to convert her into an oil burning vessel. The conversion work took nearly two months and the steamer returned to service in early November of the same year.

In October 1917 following United States entry into World War I, Mohawk together with many other vessels over 2,500 tons capacity was requisitioned by the US Government. Mohawk would continue sailing on her usual route while under the government control, occasionally transporting military personnel.

On June 1, 1918 Mohawk, after passing by two derelict vessels, encountered abandoned fully rigged schooner Edna. Edna was apparently intercepted by a German submarine U-151, who forced her crew to abandon the ship and fired a few shots at her in hopes the schooner would sink or explode as she was laden with gasoline and oil. As the schooner appeared not to have any issues with buoyancy, Mohawk took the sailing vessel in tow bringing her safely into Delaware Breakwater.

After the end of hostilities Mohawk returned to her normal obligations and continued serving the New York to Florida route for the rest of her career. On March 14, 1920 the steamer while on her way to Jacksonville with 214 passengers and 41 crew, blew her engine while 24 miles southwest of Cape Lookout. Several vessels heard her distress calls and a collier Ulysses and the Coast Guard cutter Manning rushed to her aid. While the steamer was able to temporarily repair her engines, and even slowly proceed under her own power, she was taken in tow by Manning and brought into Hampton Roads for repairs on March 17.

After completion of repairs Mohawk was temporarily assigned to the New York & Porto Rico Steamship Co. to carry passengers and mails from New York to various West Indies ports including San Juan and Mayagüez in Puerto Rico, Santo Domingo and St. Thomas, and sugar on her return trips. In this service she carried the Governor-elect of Massachusetts, Channing H. Cox, his spouse and the state military and civil officials to Puerto Rico on November 6, 1920 to attend unveiling of the commemorative plaque in honor of 6th Massachusetts Regiment. The steamer transported the delegation back to New York after conclusion of the ceremonies and a short vacation.

Shortly before Easter 1921 Mohawk was reassigned back to her usual East Coast route where she remained for the rest of her career.

=== Sinking ===
Mohawk left New York for her usual voyage to Florida at approximately 13:30 on January 1, 1925. She was under command of captain John N. Staples and was carrying 208 passengers (212 according to manifest) and 82 crew members, general cargo and 68 automobiles. The steamer ran into a strong nor'easter of New Jersey coast and was forced to slow down. At around 23:00 fire was discovered in the afterhold and the crew commenced fighting it by closing the hatches and pumping in water. After initial attempts to quickly extinguish fire failed, a distress call was sent at 23:45 and picked by the Henlopen Radio Compass Station. The Coast Guard stations at Cape May and Lewes were immediately informed and cutter Kickapoo was dispatched from Cape May to assist the distressed liner. As the storm continued raging, captain Staples decided to seek refuge in the Delaware Bay where he hoped to disembark passengers in much calmer waters. At approximately midnight passengers were informed of the situation and were told to gather on the upper deck. The distress signal was also picked by Merchants' and Miners' Steamship Co. steamer Persian whose captain being a certified Delaware Bay pilot offered to escort Mohawk. The steamer passed the breakwater at about 03:30 on January 2 and continued further north to the Brandywine Light, about twelve miles north of the breakwater where anchors were dropped. By 04:00 cutter Kickapoo arrived at the scene and continued to stand by waiting for the onset of daybreak. By 06:20 the fire spread out to the after salon and it was decided to evacuate the passengers. In addition to Kickapoo, two tugs, Kaleen and Mars, also arrived to assist the vessel. All passengers were transferred to the cutter and tugs and safely landed in Lewes at 12:40 on January 2 and then boarded a special train arranged for by the Clyde Line to take them to their destinations. In the meantime, the fire continued spreading and the crew fought it until about 09:00 when it became clear it could not be contained and the captain ordered to scuttle the ship.

The fire continued raging and the ship burnt all the way down to water edge, and was subsequently abandoned by her owners to the underwriters. The ship floated for a while in the storm and eventually ran aground on the Lower Middle Shoal, about three miles west-southwest of the Fourteen-Mile lightship and roughly fifteen mile north of the position where the steamer was abandoned. The wreck laid in approximately nine feet of water, and was inspected on January 9 by the Clyde Line representative and it appeared the whole interior of the vessel had burnt down including her machinery. Curiously, of all the cargo aboard the steamer, a lone automobile survived the fire that raged for many hours almost completely unaffected. Some time during the week of January 25, 1925 the wreck of Mohawk broke in two and the stern disappeared under water.
