= Graynella Packer =

American wireless radio operator

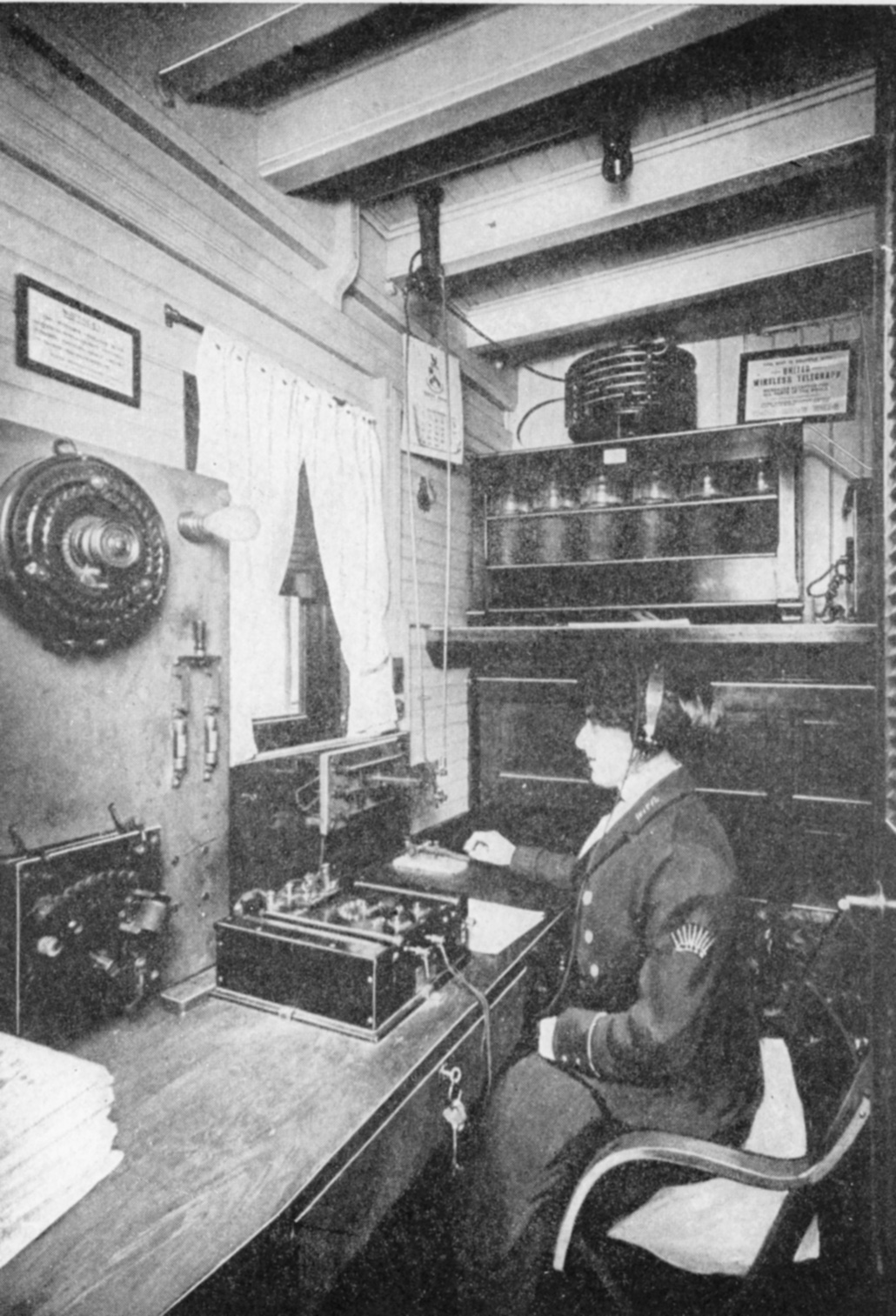
- Packer aboard the U.S.S. Mohawk, 1910.
- Born: Philadelphia, Pennsylvania
- Employer(s): United Telegraph Company, aboard a Clyde Line Steamship Company vessel (at time of photograph)

Graynella Packer was an American author and attorney, best known for being the first female radiotelegraph (wireless) operator to make overnight voyages on an ocean-going vessel, when she served aboard the steamship Mohawk along the Atlantic seaboard from November 1910 to April 1911. She later authored a training manual for Morse code telegraphy, and became a lawyer qualified to practice in four states and before the US Supreme Court.

== Early life ==
Graynella Packer (also known as "A. Graynella Packer") was born around 1888 in Philadelphia, Pennsylvania. In her teens, her family moved to Jacksonville, Florida. While attending Sutherland College there, she took technical courses and learned Morse code as a way to communicate with classmates.

== Career ==
=== Early career ===
After Packer finished college studies, she decided to go into landline telegraphy, in part due to her poor eyesight, because, in her words, "handling a key is no strain on the sight". She was employed for two years as the manager of the Sanford, Florida office of the Postal Telegraph Company. She also took regular trips on the Clyde Line steamship Comanche to New York City for vocal lessons. During these trips she became interested in the ship's radiotelegraph equipment, then commonly known as "wireless", and experimented with sending test transmissions. This interest was increased by the recent celebrated actions of operator Jack Binns aboard the Republic, whom she came to see as a model for how she would respond in a crisis.

=== Time aboard the Mohawk ===
At this time the dominant radio communications firm in the United States was the United Wireless Telegraph Company, headquartered at 42 Broadway in New York City. Because she was already making regular voyages between Jacksonville and New York, Packer approached the company about becoming a maritime operator. Management was interested, because some ship captains had expressed dissatisfaction with current male operators. For training she worked for a few weeks at the 42 Broadway station, gaining experience with communicating with company-equipped vessels along the Atlantic seaboard.

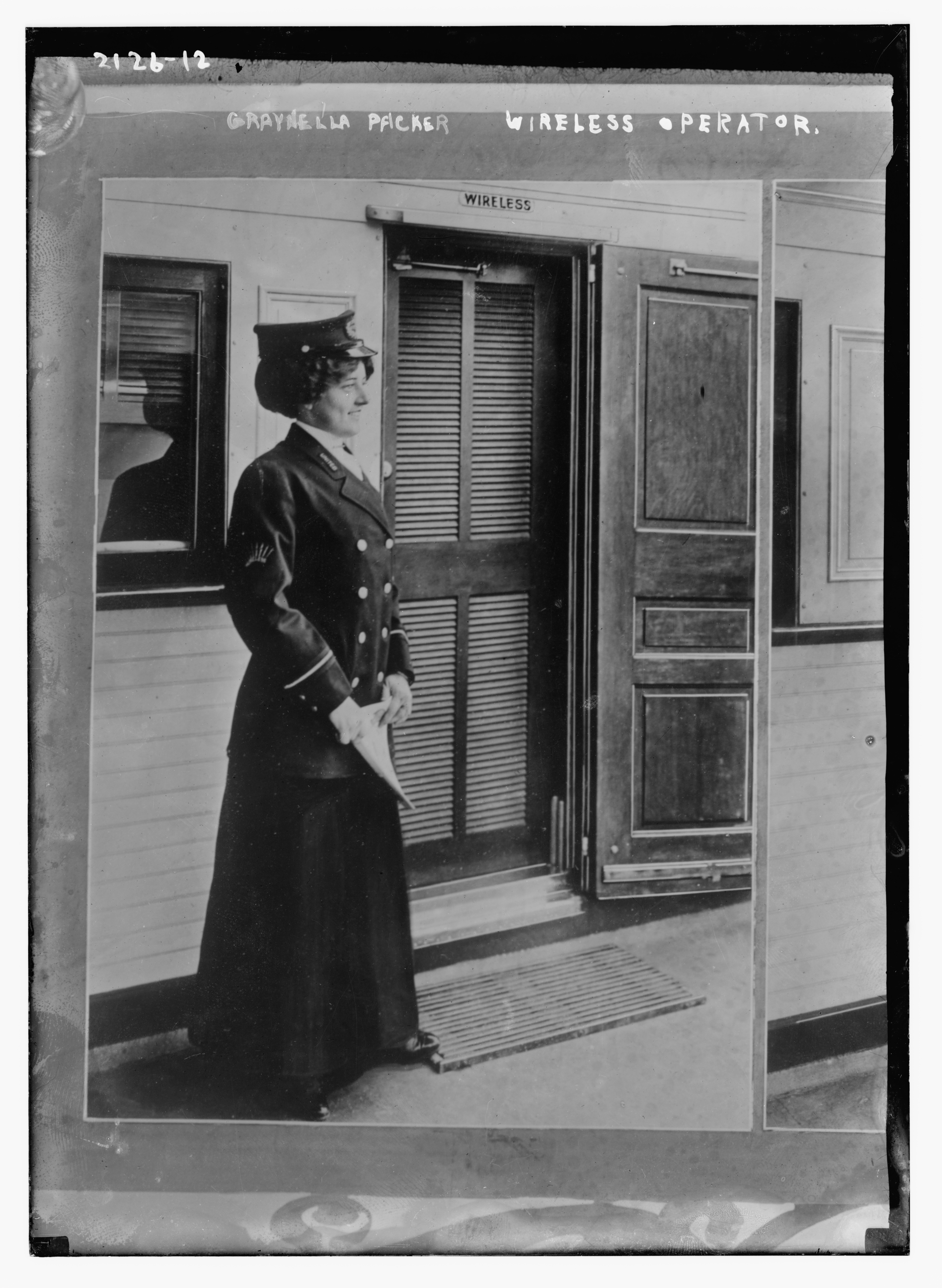
Packer aboard the Mohawk in 1910

It was eventually decided to post Packer on the Clyde Line's flagship vessel, the Mohawk, which operated along the Atlantic coast from New York City to Charleston, South Carolina, and then on to Packer's hometown of Jacksonville, Florida. On November 29, 1910, the Mohawk set off from New York with Packer on board for the first time. There had been at least one female maritime radio operator who preceded Packer—Annie Tucker, who in 1908-1909 served on a vessel making short daily runs in the Puget Sound in the state of Washington. However, Packer appears to have been the first woman on the Atlantic, and also the first to travel on the open ocean and on overnight voyages.

The ship's sole operator, Packer reported that "My berth is right in the wireless room with the little receivers near my bedside, and awake nearly once every hour to listen for messages." Her send off was heavily covered, and after reaching Charleston she noted that "When the Mohawk was ready to leave New York, there must have been twenty-five or thirty reporters there, and there were ten camera men, all requesting me to pose for my picture." Many of the early press accounts stated that Packer was 22 years old when she began to work on the Mohawk, however she later was quoted as saying "I don't know how the reporters ever came to say I was 22 years of age and I don't think I will tell you exactly how old I am."

During her first voyage as a radio operator, Packer reported that "The passengers and employes all treated me with a world of courtesy, and I am wholly delighted". However, she only served aboard the vessel until April 1911. A later review suggested that she eventually met with conflicts from male operators, in part out of concern that, as had happened in landline telegraphy, use of female operators would lead to job losses and lower wages.

=== Later life ===
At the time Packer began working on the Mohawk, she was quoted as saying "I don't always intend to be a wireless operator, but I am just using wireless to help me in my career in life. For I have an ambition to become a concert and church singer, and I have become an operator to help me in my life work." In 1914 she graduated from a year-long Public School Music program at Albany college in Oregon, and the next summer enrolled at the University of Washington in Seattle. In 1918 she published an instruction manual titled "Rhythmic Telegraphy".

In May 1921 she received a Bachelor of Laws degree from Cumberland University. After relocating to Tulsa, she began practicing in Oklahoma that year, and in 1933 was admitted to practice before the U.S. Supreme court. By 1935 she was qualified to practice law in four states, had been elected the first woman secretary of the Bar Association of Oklahoma, and made multiple international trips, including a world tour in 1934.

She was reported to be holding teaching assignments in Pokomoke, Maryland in 1953, and Nogales, Arizona in 1954.

== Legacy ==
One of the most contentious topics in the United States in the early 1910s was women's suffrage, promoting voting rights for women. Packer was reported to be opposed to the idea, and was quoted as saying "Am I a suffragette? Well, not exactly. To be very frank I have been too busy with my work to pay attention to such things as suffrage." and "...I also believe there are certain fields which should be left entirely to men—that of politics, for instance." However, on the subject of expanded opportunities for women, she was more supportive, stating "I believe that self-supporting women should be allowed to hold positions for which their individual temperaments and training may fit them."

Packer's activities as a pioneering shipboard radio operator were widely reported in the newspapers and magazines of the time, with one early article stating that "As a result of the daily service of the Clyde line and the need of additional operators it is expected that several other women will be employed in the near future." This inspired other women to follow her example, but in 1920 an anonymous account reviewed one woman, who, inspired by Packer, unsuccessfully attempted to also become a maritime operator, only to find that many obstacles remained. This individual contacted Packer's employer, United Wireless, to see if she could qualify for a similar assignment, but found the company to be evasive and noncommittal. She went on train herself to send and receive Morse code, and also set up an amateur radio station in order to become acquainted with operating techniques and equipment maintenance. She also obtained the necessary government-issued Certificate of Skill needed to qualify as a commercial operator. However, this proved unsuccessful in obtaining employment as a shipboard operator, and "heart-broken" that she would not be able to emulate Packer's achievement, she ultimately concluded that "lady radio operators were no longer fashionable".

== See also ==
- Women in early radio#Early female shipboard operators
