= Gladys Kathleen Parkin =

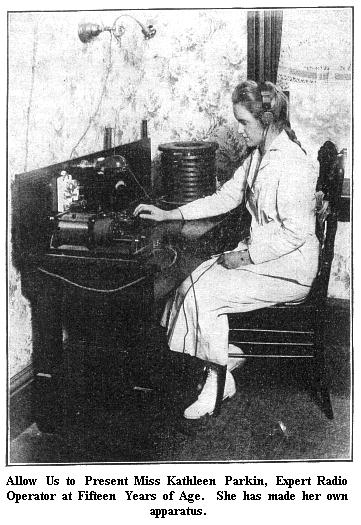
- Born: September 27, 1900; Bolinas, California, US
- Died: August 3, 1990 (aged 89); Marin County, California, US
- Known for: Wireless radio operator

Gladys Kathleen Parkin (September 27, 1900 – August 3, 1990) was one of the earliest and youngest women to obtain a first-class government-issued radio license.

== Career ==
Parkin was born in Bolinas, California, at the Flagstaff Hotel owned by her parents, John Parkin and Hannah Marie Bennett Parkin. The family relocated to San Rafael, California before the 1906 San Francisco earthquake destroyed the property.

Parkin became interested in wireless telegraphy at age 5, and operated an amateur wireless station in her home in San Rafael for six years with her brother, John Parkin. Theirs was one of the first wireless stations in California.

On April 13, 1916, while a fifteen-year-old high school student at the Dominican College in San Rafael, she obtained a first-class commercial radio operator's license from the United States Government with the call sign 6SO. The license entitled her to operate any grade of wireless station and to secure employment on vessels. She was the youngest successful female applicant for a radio license ever examined by the Government at that time.

Prior to receiving her professional license, she held an amateur radio license for six years. She applied for the government license on a whim, just to see whether she could pass or not, and passed the examination with a high score. She was the third woman to successfully pass the examination for a first-class radio license, and the first woman in California.

Parkin designed all her own instruments, including a ¼ kilowatt spark-gap transmitter.

Parkin was featured on the cover of the October 1916 issue of Electrical Experimenter. In an article titled "The Feminine Wireless Amateur," she was quoted as saying:

With reference to my ideas about the wireless profession as a vocation or worthwhile hobby for women, I think wireless telegraphy is a most fascinating study, and one which could very easily be taken up by girls, as it is a great deal more interesting than the telephone and telegraph work, in which so many girls are now employed. I am only fifteen, and I learned the code several years ago, by practicing a few minutes each day on a buzzer. I studied a good deal and I found it quite easy to obtain my first grade commercial government license, last April. It seems to me that every one should at least know the code, as cases might easily arise of a ship in distress, where the operators might be incapacitated, and a knowledge of the code might be the means of saving the ship and the lives of the passengers. But the interest in wireless does not end in the knowledge of the code. You can gradually learn to make all your own instruments, as I have done with my 1/4 kilowatt set. There is always more ahead of you, as wireless telegraphy is still in its infancy.

She continued her career working with her brothers, John and Richard, in the family radio business, Parkin Manufacturing Company, manufacturing and operating wireless instruments in San Rafael, California. By the age of 25, she was known by virtually every amateur radio-fan in her district, as she kept up an active interest in radio development and its future possibilities.
