= Marconi Wireless Telegraph Company of America =

American telegraph company

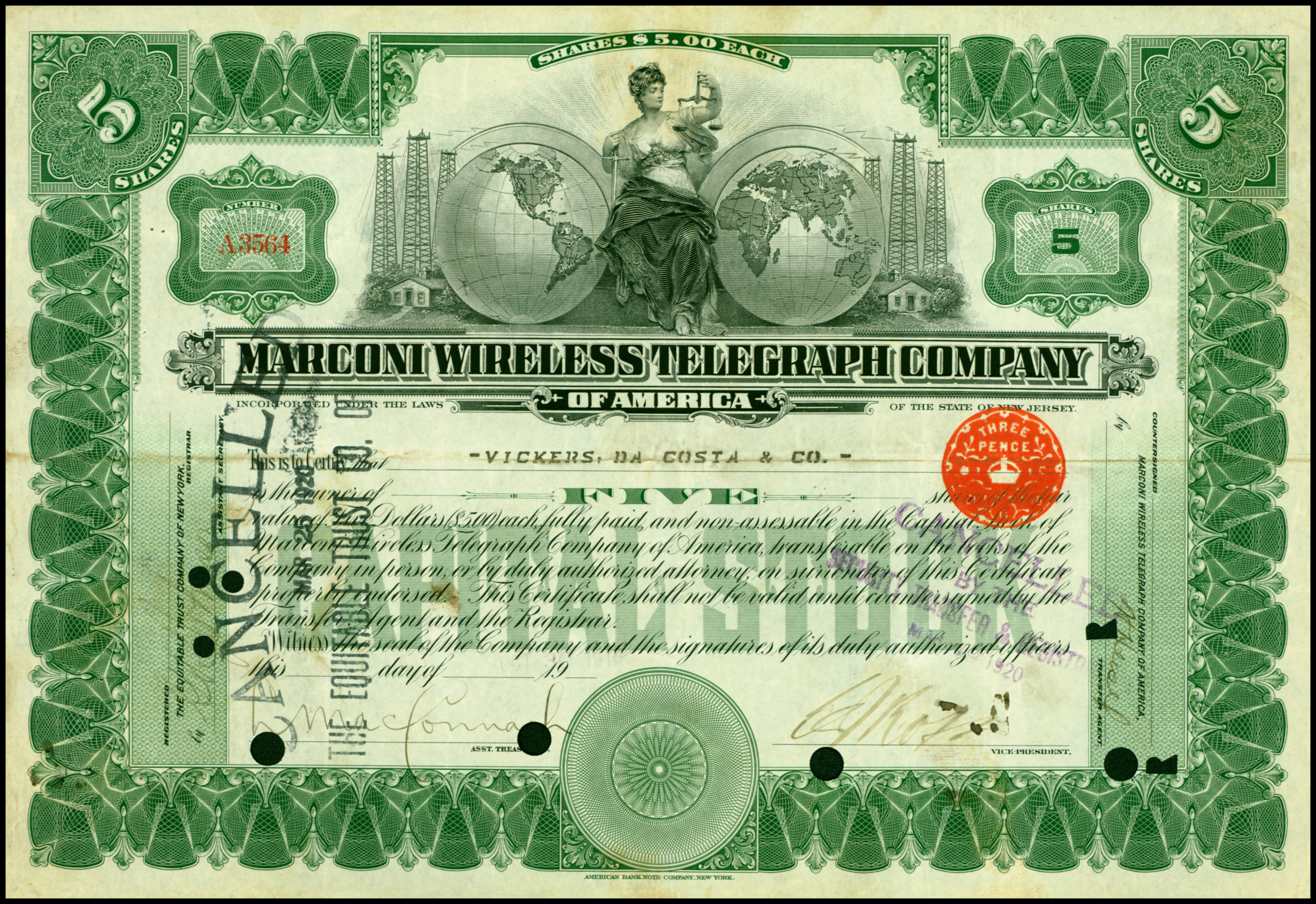
Share of the Marconi Wireless Telegraph Company of America, issued 30. October 1916

The Marconi Wireless Telegraph Company of America (commonly called American Marconi) was incorporated in 1899. It was established as a subsidiary of the British Marconi Company and held the U.S. and Cuban rights to Guglielmo Marconi's radio (then called "wireless telegraphy") patents. American Marconi initially primarily operated high-powered land and transatlantic shipboard stations. In 1912, it acquired the extensive assets of the bankrupt United Wireless Telegraph Company, becoming the dominant radio communications provider in the United States.

During World War One the United States government assumed control of the radio industry. After the war government officials balked at returning the American Marconi stations to the original owners, distrusting British control of radio communication due to national security concerns. Led by the U.S. Navy, the government pressured the Marconi companies to transfer American Marconi to a U.S. owner. The American Marconi assets were purchased by General Electric in 1919, which provided the foundation for creating its new subsidiary, the Radio Corporation of America.

== Formation and corporate activities ==
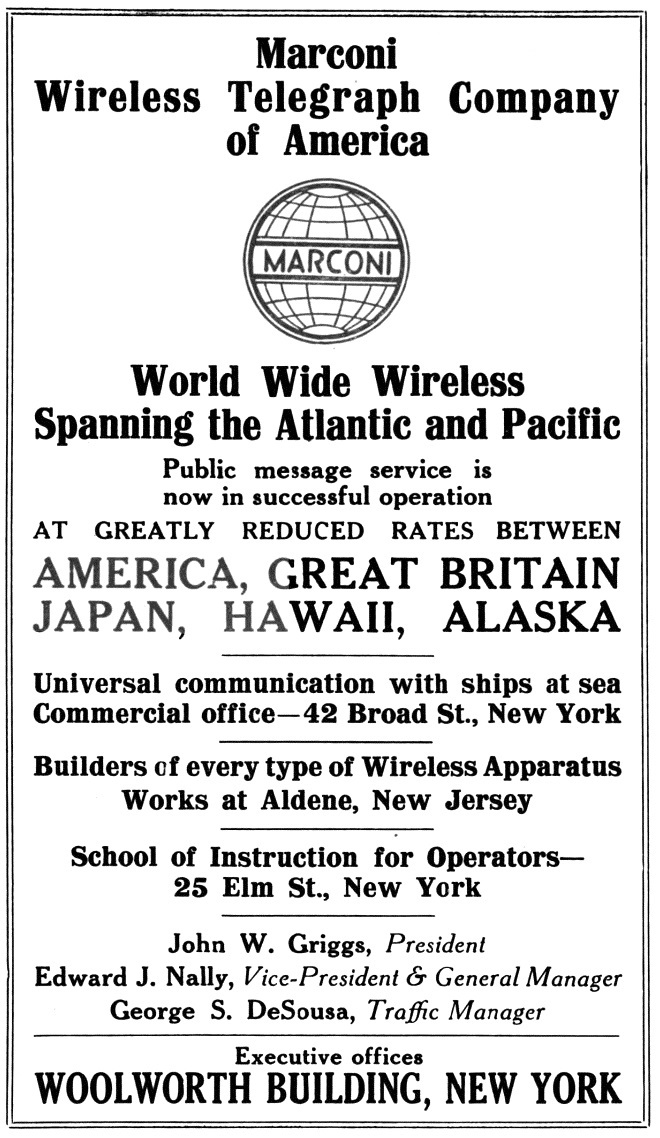
American Marconi advertisement (1917)

On July 20, 1897, the Wireless Telegraph and Signal Company, Limited, was founded in London to promote the radio inventions of Guglielmo Marconi. (The company's name was changed to Marconi's Wireless Telegraph Company, Limited in March 1900, and was commonly referred to as "British Marconi".) Looking to expand their efforts worldwide, a roster of subsidiary companies was established, holding regional rights to the Marconi patents. The Marconi Wireless Telegraph Company of America was incorporated in New Jersey on November 8, 1899 as the first subsidiary company. It was granted the "sole right to use and exploit the Marconi patents in the United States of America, the Hawaiian Islands, Philippine Islands, Cuba, Porto Rico, Alaska and the Aleutian Islands".

In the opinion of the Marconi companies, they were the only legitimate radio communication providers, as they asserted that all their competitors provided inferior offerings that infringed on the Marconi patents. Following standard Marconi policy, prior to 1912 American Marconi would not sell equipment, instead leasing it, while supplying operators who were loyal company employees. The most controversial early company policy was the standing order that, except in the case of emergencies, Marconi shore and ship stations would refuse to communicate with vessels employing radio equipment manufactured by other companies. This unwillingness to communicate with other systems would eventually be prohibited by international treaties, beginning with the Preliminary Conference on Wireless Telegraphy held in Berlin in 1903. In the United States, the Wireless Ship Act of 1910, which required that most passenger vessels plying U.S. ports carry radio equipment, also specified that they had to be willing to communicate "with shore or ship stations using other systems of radio-communication". The Radio Act of 1912 instituted radio station licensing, and further required that shore stations open to general public service "shall be bound to exchange radiograms with any similar shore station and with any ship station without distinction of the radio system adopted by such stations".

American Marconi's growth in the United States was initially limited due to some unusual factors. Its largest potential customer was the U.S. government, and in particular the U.S. Navy, which rapidly developed plans to equip its vessels with radio transmitters. However, the Navy would have a contentious relationship with the company during most of its existence. An early source of friction was a Marconi station installed on the Nantucket Shoals light-ship by the New York Herald in the summer of 1901. American Marconi's refusal to communicate with non-Marconi stations soon led to an international incident when, in early 1902, the Nantucket operators were unwilling to acknowledge a transmission from the German vessel Deutschland. The German government made a formal protest, and Navy attempted to get American Marconi to eliminate the restrictive policy, but company officials refused, so the Lighthouse Board ordered the Marconi equipment removed, and it was replaced by a station designed by the Navy.

Naval officials also wanted to purchase radio equipment outright, instead of leasing it, something American Marconi would not agree to prior to the 1912 policy change. They additionally felt the prices American Marconi wanted to charge were exorbitant. Thus, the Navy instead turned to other manufacturers, in particular, the German firm Telefunken. The Navy also contracted with domestic firms to produce equipment according to designs specified by the Navy, and produced additional equipment in its own shops.

On the commercial side, American Marconi's primary early competitor was the American DeForest Wireless Telegraph Company, which in late 1906 reorganized as the United Wireless Telegraph Company. United concentrated on the domestic market, and built far more land stations and had many more shipboard installations than American Marconi. United's competitive advantage was due to the fact that it provided shipboard equipment and operators at little or no cost. It was able to do this because, instead of trying to make a profit on legitimate operations, both American De Forest and United were organized as stock promotion schemes, designed by management to loot the funds of unwary investors purchasing heavily promoted and vastly overpriced stock.

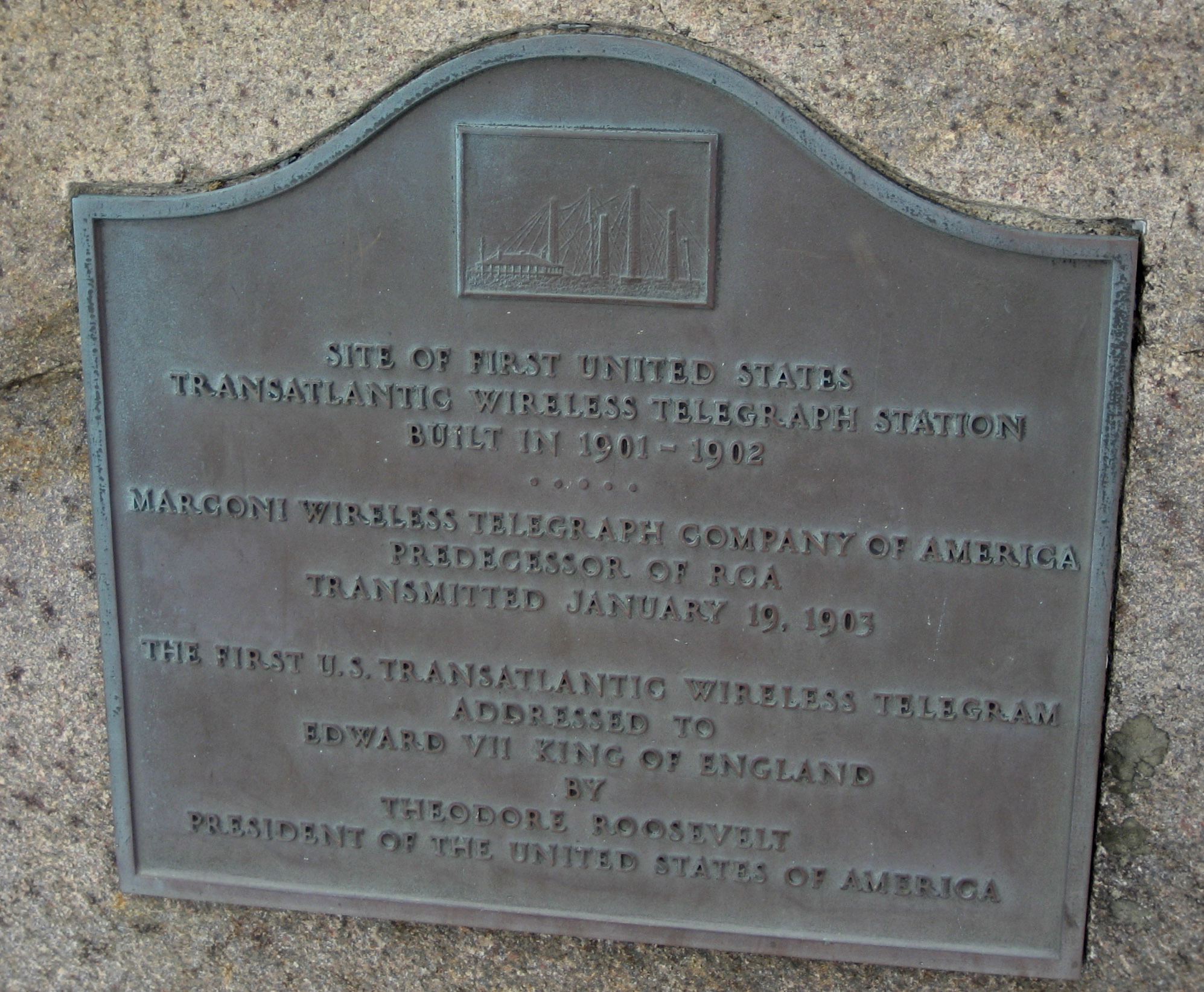
Plaque marking the site of a high-powered station established by American Marconi at South Wellfleet, Cape Cod, Massachusetts in 1901-1902

Faced with these barriers, American Marconi initially concentrated on establishing a small number of high-powered land stations, which provided transatlantic communication in competition with the existing undersea telegraph cables, in addition to serving passenger vessels making the Atlantic crossing. As late as early 1912, the company had only five land stations and forty marine installations.

John Bottomley, a New York attorney, had primary responsibility for setting up American Marconi, and after a 1902 reorganization served as the new company's general manager, secretary and treasurer. In 1913 Edward J. Nally took over the general manager's post. In 1905, the position of company president was established, which was held by former New Jersey governor John W. Griggs from the office's establishment until the company's dissolution. Frederick Stammis became the company's chief engineer in 1908, and was replaced by Roy Weagant in 1915. Perhaps the most famous American Marconi employee was David Sarnoff, who was hired as an office boy in September 1906, and by 1917 had become the company's commercial manager. Sarnoff later became the third president of the Radio Corporation of America (RCA).

American Marconi also branched out into some ancillary activities. In 1911, the Wanamaker department stores contracted to have radiotelegraph stations, providing two-way communication, installed atop their Philadelphia and New York City stores. The next year a manufacturing plant was established in Aldene, New Jersey; previously equipment had been imported from Great Britain. Beginning in 1912 the company published a monthly magazine named The Marconigraph, which a year later was expanded and renamed The Wireless Age, and in 1912 it also took over United Wireless' The Aerogram magazine, relaunching it as Ocean Wireless News. One of the more ambitious projects involved tests installing radio communication equipment aboard Delaware, Lackawanna and Western Railroad trains, conducted in 1913. In late 1915 the company announced the formation of the National Amateur Wireless Association (NAWA), an organization oriented towards amateur radio enthusiasts. NAWA's primary objective at its founding was promoting military preparedness. American Marconi also established a publishing house, Wireless Press, Inc. in 1916, and created the Marconi Institute to provide training for commercial operators.

== Patent disputes ==
Overall American Marconi's patent rights were sufficient to give it a leading role in the U.S., and in his review of radio industry legal disputes, W. Rupert MacLaurin noted that "The position of American Marconi was such that the threat of suit was often sufficient to cause an infringing firm to halt its operations." MacLaurin found a total of ten patent infringement cases involving American Marconi which had entered the court system. In eight instances the company was the plaintiff, winning in four and losing three, with one case discontinued. In the two suits where it was the defendant, American Marconi prevailed in one and lost the other.

The American Marconi cases included some of the most prominent of the time.

In 1904 John Ambrose Fleming invented a two-element vacuum tube, which became known as the Fleming valve. Although it had limited applications, it could be used for receiving radio signals. In 1906 Lee de Forest developed a three-element vacuum tube, that he named the Audion, and which he maintained had been developed separately from the Fleming's work. Over the next few years de Forest's device would be improved until it could be used for high quality reception and amplification, as well as for radio transmitters. American Marconi sued de Forest for infringing the original Fleming patent. The U.S. courts eventually ruled that both Fleming's and de Forest's patents were valid, which led to an impasse, as it meant neither could legally manufacture three-element vacuum tubes. This legal entanglement would eventually be inherited by RCA as American Marconi's successor.

A controversial Navy policy during this time was its practice of disregarding patent rights when awarding equipment contracts. Under the provisions of a June 25, 1910 congressional act, it also provided immunity to the manufacturers by assuming all legal liability, which in turn meant that companies claiming patent infringement had to seek relief from the government through the Court of Claims, a cumbersome and expensive process. American Marconi decided to launch a test case, claiming that the Navy could not legally grant immunity to infringing firms, and in September 1915 the company sought a court injunction against Emil J. Simon. American Marconi lost in the lower courts, but the case eventually reached the Supreme Court, which on March 4, 1918 ruled in favor of the plaintiffs. However, the victory would be short-lived, because on July 1, 1918 legislation passed by the U.S Congress restored the Navy's ability to shield contracting manufacturers by assuming the legal risks.

== Acquisition of United Wireless ==
At the time of the formation of the United Wireless Telegraph Company in late 1906, American DeForest president Abraham White claimed that the new company would be a grand merger between his company and British Marconi plus the Marconi subsidiaries. American Marconi president Griggs quickly and "absolutely and unequivocally" denied White's claim, and further declared that "the scheme of merger announced by Mr. White is antagonistic and repugnant to the interests of both of the Marconi companies". However, United Wireless would continue to be the primary radio communications firm in the United States until its eventual collapse.

United's longstanding stock fraud activities began to unravel in the summer of 1910, when the company's principal officers were arrested by Post Office inspectors and charged with mail fraud. The crippled firm attempted to reorganize, but the Marconi interests saw this as an opportunity to attack the weakened company by launching a patent infringement suit. United's receivers found that their position was hopeless, and in early 1912 entered into negotiations to have their company, which operated 500 ship and 70 land stations, taken over by American Marconi. The resulting transaction consisted of two parts: British Marconi first purchased all of United Wireless' tangible assets, which in turn on March 29, 1912 were sold by the parent company to American Marconi. It would later be alleged that this had unfairly benefited some British investors, in what came to be known as the Marconi scandal.

The acquisition would prove to be a tremendous boost to American Marconi's fortunes, and the company boasted that "There is now nothing in the way of Marconi becoming the only system of commercial importance in the world." Recently passed laws required U.S. passenger ships to carry radio equipment, and American Marconi's near monopoly allowed it to set its own prices for the service. Previously the company had struggled financially, losing money in each of its first eleven years, and had not paid a stock dividend prior to a 2% payout in 1912. However, in his 1912 annual report treasurer John Bottomley exuberantly reported that "The condition of the treasury is satisfactory, if not plethoric. We have, together with cash on hand and investments running 4-12 months, the sum of over five million dollars, all of which is available at any time." In 1915 the company further stated that "The number of ship and shore equipments now operated by your company is approximately twenty times that of three years ago."

== World War One ==
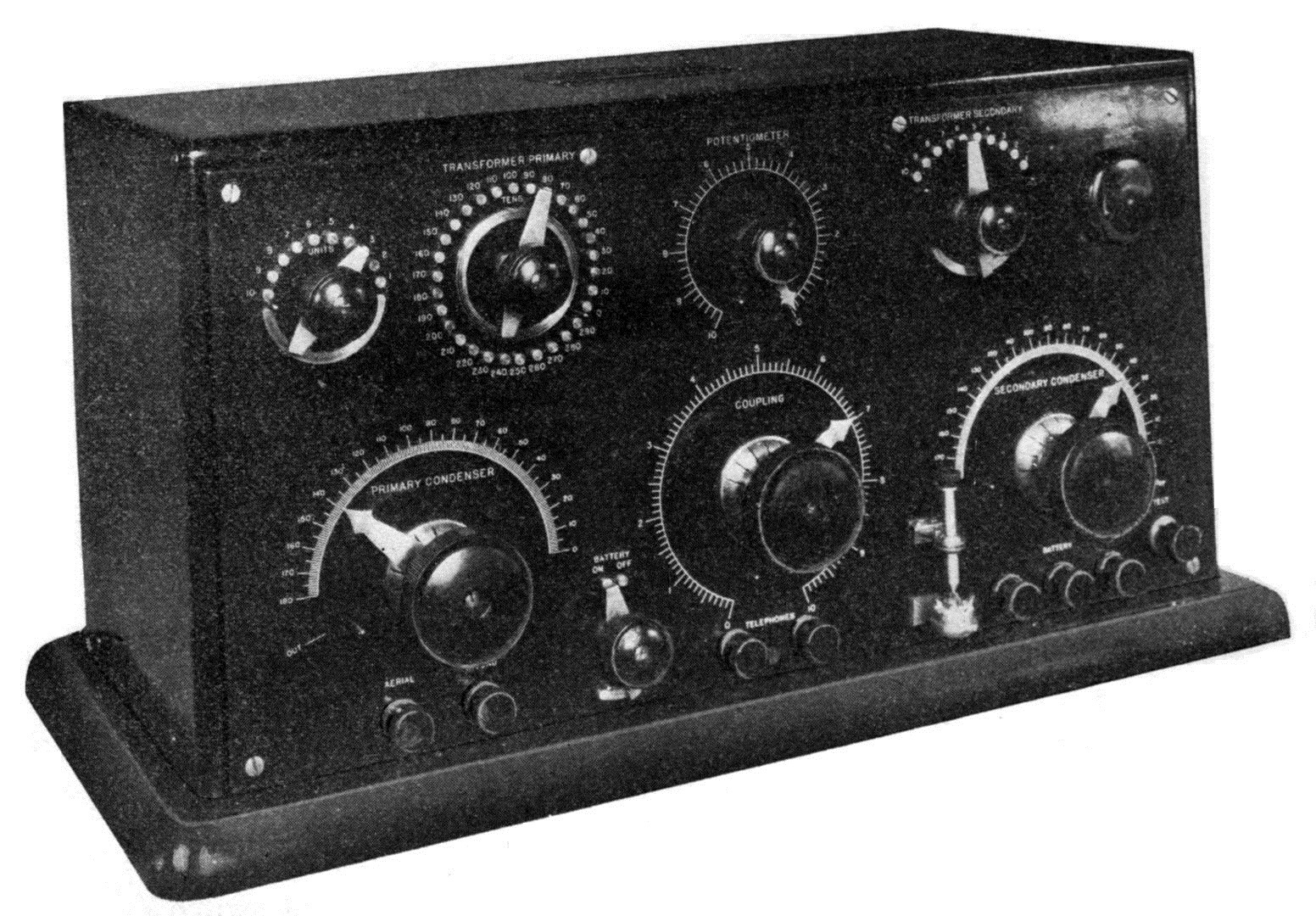
Type 106 crystal receiver (circa 1917), designed by American Marconi Research Engineer Harry Shoemaker

Following the start of World War One in Europe, the United States declared its strict neutrality in the conflict. Due to concerns that radio stations could be covertly used to aid a belligerent, on August 5, 1914 President Woodrow Wilson issued an executive order imposing monitoring and censorship of their transmissions. In contrast to the immediate compliance by the other companies, American Marconi unsuccessfully attempted to challenge the legality of the order in the courts. While this was taking place, the U.S. Navy became concerned that a September 2 message relayed by the American Marconi station at Siasconset, Massachusetts might have violated neutrality, but when asked for an explanation company officials refused to cooperate. The Navy finally ordered the station to cease operations at noon on September 25. After a brief final outburst of insolence — upon receiving the order to close, a company employee queried whether federal officials were "prepared to carry out your order by force" — the station reluctantly obeyed. It remained closed until January 16 of the following year, when, with its legal options exhausted, it began to comply with the Navy's procedures.

After the United States entered World War One, on April 7, 1917 a presidential order instructed most civilian U.S. radio stations to cease operating, and those considered to be of value to the war effort were taken over by the government. The Navy assumed control of fifty-three American Marconi coastal stations, closing twenty-eight of them as unneeded. Also taken over were 370 radio-equipped oceangoing vessels, although an additional 170 smaller vessels and tugs were left under American Marconi control. The war resulted in large orders for radio equipment, and the Aldene plant was expanded, with employment in 1917 rising from 200 to 700.

Although the overall U.S. government plan was to restore civilian ownership of the seized radio stations once the war ended, many Navy officials hoped to retain a monopoly on radio communication after the war. Defying instructions to the contrary, the Navy began purchasing large numbers of stations outright. As part of these efforts it offered to purchase the American Marconi shore stations that it was operating. Company officials noted that their oceangoing stations would be of little value if they no longer had any shore stations, so the Navy expanded the acquisition to include these ship stations.

With the conclusion of the conflict, Congress turned down the Navy's efforts to have peacetime control of the radio industry, and instructed the Navy to make plans to return the commercial stations it controlled, including the ones it had improperly purchased, to the original owners. However, due to national security considerations, the Navy was particularly concerned about returning the high-powered international stations to American Marconi, since a majority of its stock was in foreign hands, and the British already largely controlled the international undersea cables. This concern was increased by the announcement in late 1918 of the formation of the Pan-American Wireless Telegraph and Telephone Company, a joint venture between American Marconi and the Federal Telegraph Company, with plans to set up service between the United States and South America.

== Sale to General Electric and formation of the Radio Corporation of America ==
At the American Marconi site in New Brunswick, New Jersey, the Navy had installed a high-powered Alexanderson alternator transmitter built by General Electric (GE). It proved to be superior for transatlantic transmissions to the spark transmitters that had been traditionally used by the Marconi companies. Marconi officials were so impressed by the capabilities of the Alexanderson alternators that they began making preparations to adopt them as their standard transmitters for international communication. A tentative plan made with General Electric proposed that over a two-year period the Marconi companies would purchase most of GE's alternator production. However, this proposal was met with dismay on national security grounds by the U.S. Navy, which was concerned that this would guarantee British domination of international radio communication.

The Navy, claiming the support of President Wilson, began to develop an alternative that would result in an "all-American" company taking over the American Marconi assets. In April 1919 two naval officers, Admiral H. G. Bullard and Commander S. C. Hooper, met with GE's president, Owen D. Young, asking that he suspend the pending alternator sales to the Marconi companies. This would leave General Electric without a buyer for its alternators, so the officers proposed that GE purchase American Marconi, and use the assets to form its own radio communications subsidiary. Young consented to this proposal, which, effective November 20, 1919, transformed American Marconi into the Radio Corporation of America. RCA retained most of the American Marconi staff, with former vice president and general manager E. J. Nally becoming RCA's first president. The new company also inherited American Marconi's status as the dominant radio communications firm in the United States.

== Final patent case settlement ==
During World War One, the U.S. government promised that after the conflict's conclusion it would compensate patent holders for the use of their patents, and even after the formation of RCA the original American Marconi shareholders stood to benefit from this settlement. Following the end of hostilities a special Interdepartmental Radio Board was formed to review the claims. On May 31, 1921, the board issued a report to the U.S. Congress recommending award amounts for the affected parties, including $1,253,389.02 for four patents controlled by American Marconi. However, Congress decided not to follow the board's recommendation to immediately pay the suggested compensation amounts, and instead informed the patent holders that they would have to follow the normal procedure of suing for compensation through the Court of Claims.

Settling the American Marconi claims would take another 22 years, before finally concluding in 1943 after a review by the Supreme Court. It also resulted in a payment far smaller than that proposed by the Interdepartmental Radio Board, with the plaintiffs receiving only about $34,000, plus interest. One of the patents for which the Marconi interests had wanted compensation covered Fleming's two-element vacuum tube. However, the Supreme Court ruled that this patent had been improperly issued, and thus was invalid. An even more dramatic setback concerned (among U.S. patent RE11913 and U.S. patent 676,332 in 1901) the tuning patent U.S. patent 763,772 from 1904 which had previously been fundamental to many American Marconi legal victories. This "four sevens" patent — so named because Marconi's U.S. patent No. 763,772 was a counterpart to the original filing, British patent No. 7,777 — was also found to be invalid, with the court ruling that it had been anticipated by John Stone Stone's U.S. patent 714,756 as well as those by Lodge and Tesla. The verdict stated that “Marconi's reputation as the man who first achieved successful radio transmission ... is not here in question”, and that the adoption of adjustable transformers in the transmitting and receiving circuits, which was an improvement of the initial invention, was anticipated by patents issued to Oliver Lodge and John Stone. Marconi's patent was also rendered irrelevant by the court preferring U.S. patent 645,576, resulting in no compensation from the US Navy.

== See also ==
- Canadian Marconi Company
- Marconi scandal
