= United Wireless Telegraph Company =

American radio communications company

- Type: Public
- Industry: Telecommunications
- Founded: 1906
- Founder: Abraham White
- Defunct: 1912
- Area served: North America

The United Wireless Telegraph Company was the largest radio communications firm in the United States, from its late-1906 formation until its bankruptcy and takeover by Marconi interests in mid-1912. At the time of its demise, the company was operating around 70 land and 400 shipboard radiotelegraph installations — by far the most in the U.S. However, the firm's management had been substantially more interested in fraudulent stock promotion schemes than in ongoing operations or technical development. United Wireless' shutdown, following federal mail fraud prosecution, was hailed for eliminating one of the largest financial frauds of the period. However, its disappearance also left the U.S. radio industry largely under foreign influence, dominated by the British-controlled Marconi Wireless Telegraph Company of America (American Marconi).

== Formation ==
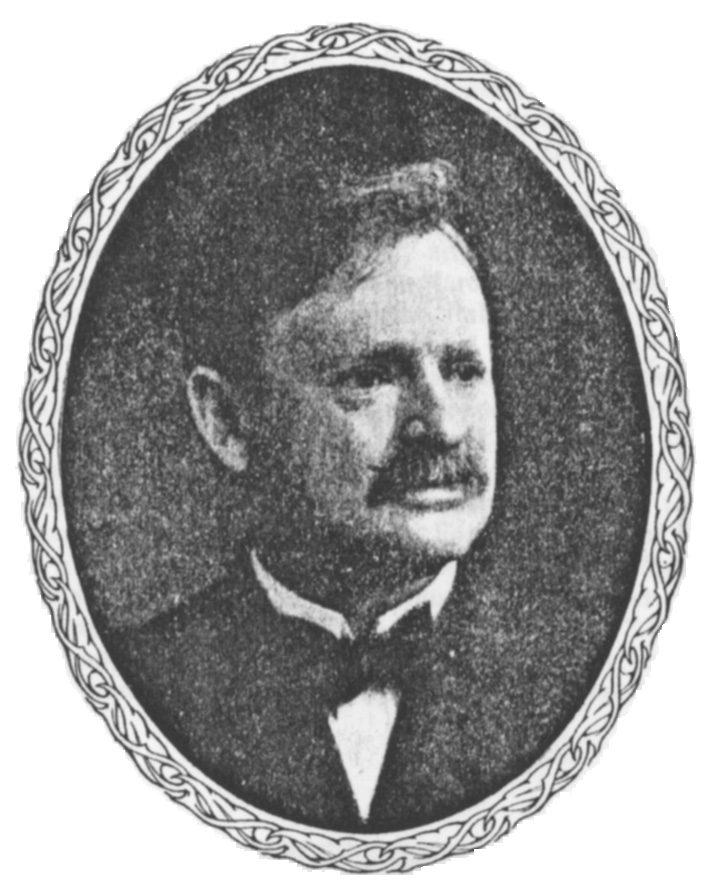
Abraham White, founder and first president of United Wireless (1906)

United Wireless' establishment was announced with great fanfare in November 1906 by its founder and first president, stock promoter Abraham White. Legally, the company was a reorganization of the Amalgamated Wireless Securities Company, which had been organized under the laws of Maine on December 6, 1904. (There had been considerable skepticism about Amalgamated at the time of its formation, with a United States Investor reviewer labeling it "the latest move in the De Forest Wireless comedy".) United was initially capitalized by 1,000,000 shares of stock at $10 a share, par value. In February 1907 the capitalization was increased to 2,000,000 shares at the par value, divided between 1,000,000 preferred and 1,000,000 common shares.

Beginning in 1902, White, promoting the work of inventor Lee de Forest, had headed a series of radio companies with dubious reputations, culminating in the American DeForest Wireless Telegraph Company. As part of the reorganization, United leased American DeForest's assets for $1, a maneuver that, not coincidentally, blocked American DeForest's creditors, most prominently Reginald Fessenden, from collecting on their legal judgments. United's head office was located at the old American DeForest headquarters at 42 Broadway, in New York City, and the company continued publication of the house organ The Aerogram.

American DeForest stockholders were offered the chance to exchange their now essentially worthless holdings for United stock, in a series of complicated and confusing financial transactions that were generally to the advantage of company insiders at the expense of regular shareholders. One unusual feature of the stock transfer offers was that the number of shares to be received was based on the amount of money originally paid for the stock, and not on the number of shares held. This was designed to penalize persons who purchased their stock on the open market at pennies-on-the-dollar, instead of paying the full price charged for purchases made through the regular sales staff.

The newly formed United was initially, and falsely, promoted as being a consolidation of the most prominent U.S. and British radio firms, combining American DeForest with the worldwide holding of London-based Marconi's Wireless Telegraph Company, Limited. However, the grand claims about gaining control of the Marconi companies were immediately and vigorously denounced by Marconi officials as "repugnant", and Abraham White's overture to form an international company under his control was quickly and effectively repulsed.

Absent from the new company was Lee de Forest, who had been American DeForest's Scientific Director, but was forced out in the summer of 1906. De Forest later stated he had resigned in protest over the improper actions of company management. However, an alternate explanation is that he was no longer welcome, due to his inability to develop an effective and non-infringing radio receiver — American DeForest's employment of electrolytic detectors had led to the Fessenden lawsuits, resulting in adverse and expensive legal judgments over the company's use. Moreover, General H. H. C. Dunwoody, an American DeForest vice president, had recently invented a non-infringing carborundum detector, which made the services of de Forest appear to be unneeded.

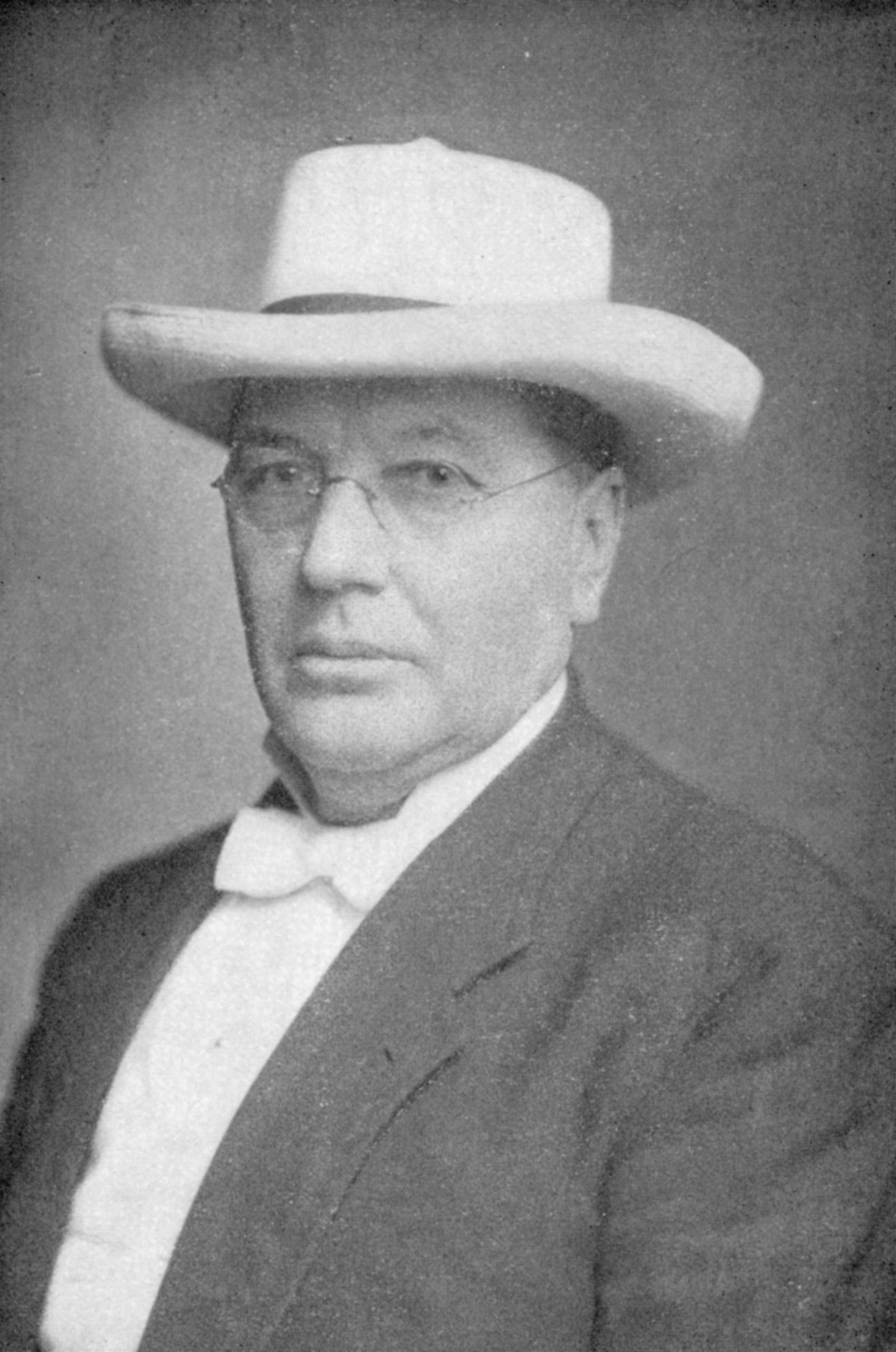
Christopher Columbus Wilson, who in 1907 gained control of United Wireless (1908)

== Wilson takeover ==
The new company had a tumultuous start. In addition to the Marconi rebuff, in February 1907, just two months after its founding, control of the company was quietly obtained by a group of self-proclaimed "reformers." The effort was led by stock promoter Colonel Christopher Columbus Wilson, the president of the International Loan & Banking Company of Denver, Colorado. Wilson, who had previously promoted American DeForest stock, forced White out to become the new company president, with Wilson's nephew, W. A. Diboll installed as company treasurer. Wilson would prove to be no more honest than White.

== Business practices ==
In 1907, the radio industry had been developing for ten years, however, it had consistently lost money, as there had been greater than expected difficulties in perfecting the technology needed to become commercially profitable. On land, radiotelegraph stations were unable to compete with existing telegraph lines. The main revenue source for the new communications technology was point-to-point radiotelegraphic communication at sea, plus transoceanic links, however, revenues from these sources were still very limited.

Because of the lack of legitimate opportunities, United was instead primarily used by company insiders to prey upon the hopes (or greed) of persons who remembered the large profits made by some early investors in telegraph and, to an even greater extent, telephone companies. United Wireless promotional materials painted a glowing picture of the company's future, including claims that their engineers would soon perfect audio transmissions, bringing income from subscribers using radiotelephones for personal communication or for listening to entertainment broadcasts.

United management continued to offer new shares to the unwary at inflated prices, while enforcing restrictions designed to artificially boost the apparent stock value. A common practice was to include a clause that blocked resale of stock on the open market, by refusing to register transferred shares. These restrictions meant that United's management could declare arbitrary stock valuations that increased at regular intervals, eventually reaching $50, allowing the company to claim fictitious appreciation that was never tested on the open market.

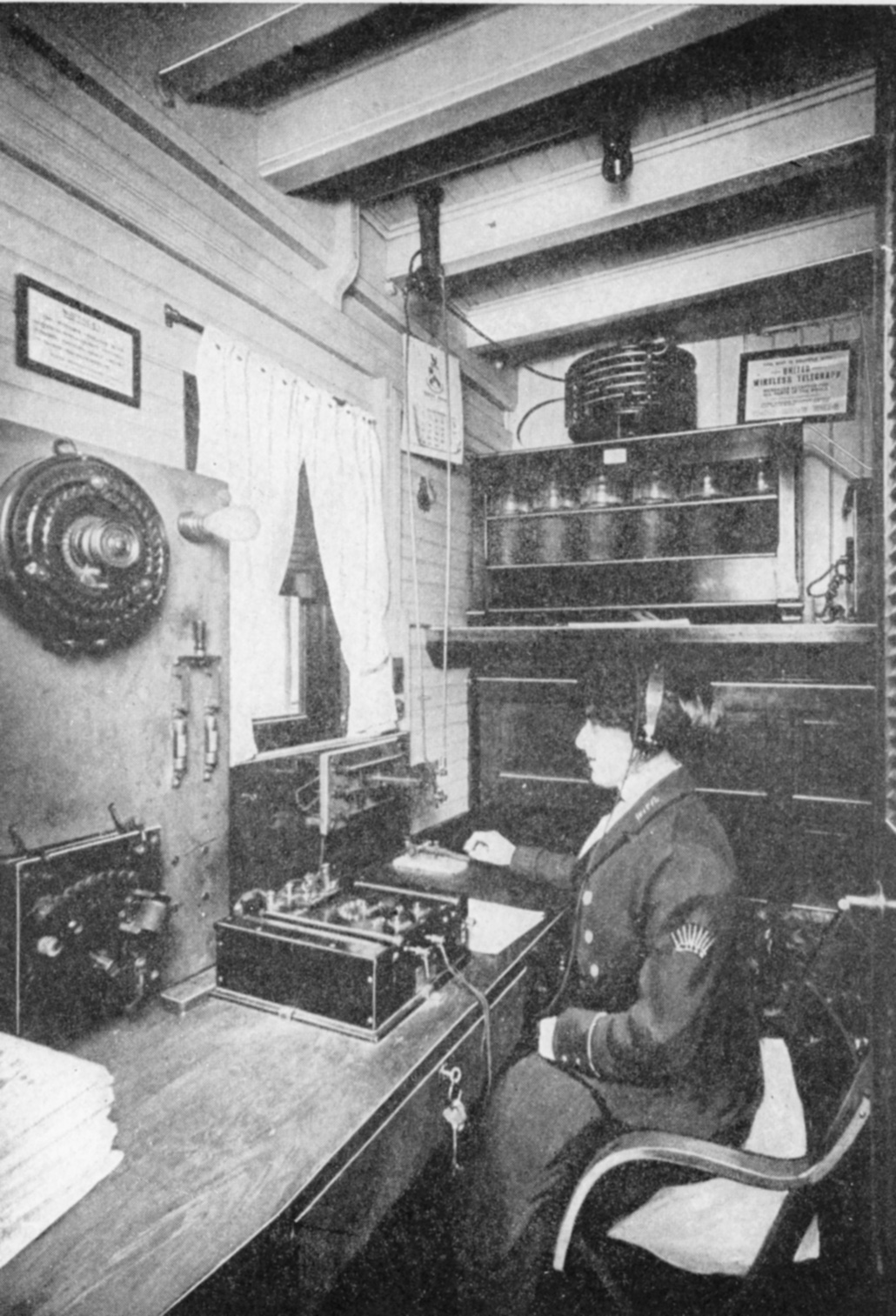
United Wireless commercial radio operator Graynella Packer aboard the S.S. Mohawk in 1910 — the first female shipboard radio operator on an ocean-going vessel.

Because the primary objective of United Wireless was the sale of nearly worthless stock at inflated prices, day-to-day operations could be used as a "loss leader" for gaining publicity, and also for driving legitimate competitors out of business by starving them of revenue. Shipboard installations and operators were provided by United at nominal rental cost or even for free. While somewhat crude by industry standards, the United equipment was efficient enough to provide adequate service for its main clientele of coastwise shipping along the United States, as United, starting with its base along the Gulf and Atlantic Coasts, expanded to dominate the Pacific coast and Great Lakes, absorbing a series of smaller firms in the process.

== Legal troubles ==
Following years of complaints, in June 1910 inspectors from the United States Postal Department moved to shut down what was described as "one of the most gigantic schemes to defraud investors that has ever been unearthed in this country", beginning with the arrest of Christopher Columbus Wilson and one of his top associates. In August, seven United officials were formally indicted in Federal court — in response, the 64-year-old Wilson, a widower, blithely married his 18-year-old secretary. A trial followed the next year, and that May five United officials, including Wilson, were convicted of mail fraud, receiving sentences ranging from one to three years. (Wilson would die in prison, at the Atlanta, Georgia penitentiary, in August 1912.)

Crippled by the prosecution of its upper management, United declared bankruptcy and went into receivership in July 1911. It faced a second crisis when it was sued by the Marconi company for patent infringement. The case came to court in March 1912 and was quickly won by Marconi when United admitted that it had no defense, resulting in a judgment in favor of the plaintiffs. After a short period of negotiation, United's assets were exchanged for 140,000 shares of British Marconi stock, worth about $1.1 million, meaning that the United stockholders received about $2 per share for their holdings. United's physical assets were then transferred from the parent Marconi company to American Marconi.

Abraham White's original dream of consolidating the largest U.S. radio company with Marconi operations had now taken place, although under very different circumstances than White had envisioned. American Marconi, previously a minor factor in the U.S. market, was now in a position to dominate its few remaining competitors. However, despite its American charter, the company was seen as controlled by its British counterpart, so in 1919, pressured by the United States Navy, American Marconi would sell its assets to General Electric, which used them to form the Radio Corporation of America, creating a new dominant American radio company.

== Legacy ==
Overall, United Wireless' six-year dominance of U.S. radio communications had a strong negative impact, in part due to the skepticism and disrepute it and other fraudulent U.S. companies brought to the fledgling industry. (Two other major fraudulent firms prosecuted in 1912 were de Forest's Radio Telephone Company, and the Continental Wireless Telephone and Telegraph Company, led by A. Frederick Collins).

Reviews of the United era were not completely negative. By providing radio equipment and operators below cost to freighters and small passenger vessels, which normally would not have been able to afford the service, United helped save the lives of endangered seafarers now able to summon assistance during emergencies. Lee de Forest, while decrying the excesses of the company's senior management, had good things to say about some of the technical staff, writing: "Charles Galbraith and his corps of honest, capable, hard-working men, engineers, and operators who had been instrumental in building up the American De Forest Wireless Telegraph Company, had gone determinedly ahead developing 'United' along sane and businesslike lines..." In particular, equipment designed by Harry Shoemaker had a good enough reputation so that he was employed by American Marconi when that company took over United Wireless.

However, a more common opinion about the company appeared in the December 1907 issue of World's Work magazine: "The very word 'wireless' brings a smile to the lips of the Wall Street man... The time may come when the wireless will become suitable for consideration by investors. It will not come until some strong, clean, honest financial interests take charge and utterly eliminate the miserable, fraudulent, unwholesome methods that have marked the whole market history of these issues." John Bottomly, General Manager of American Marconi, assigned the job of incorporating United's assets into the Marconi operations, found the job challenging, reporting that: "A spirit of carelessness seems to have run through the whole conduct of [United] which is almost unparalleled in business history."

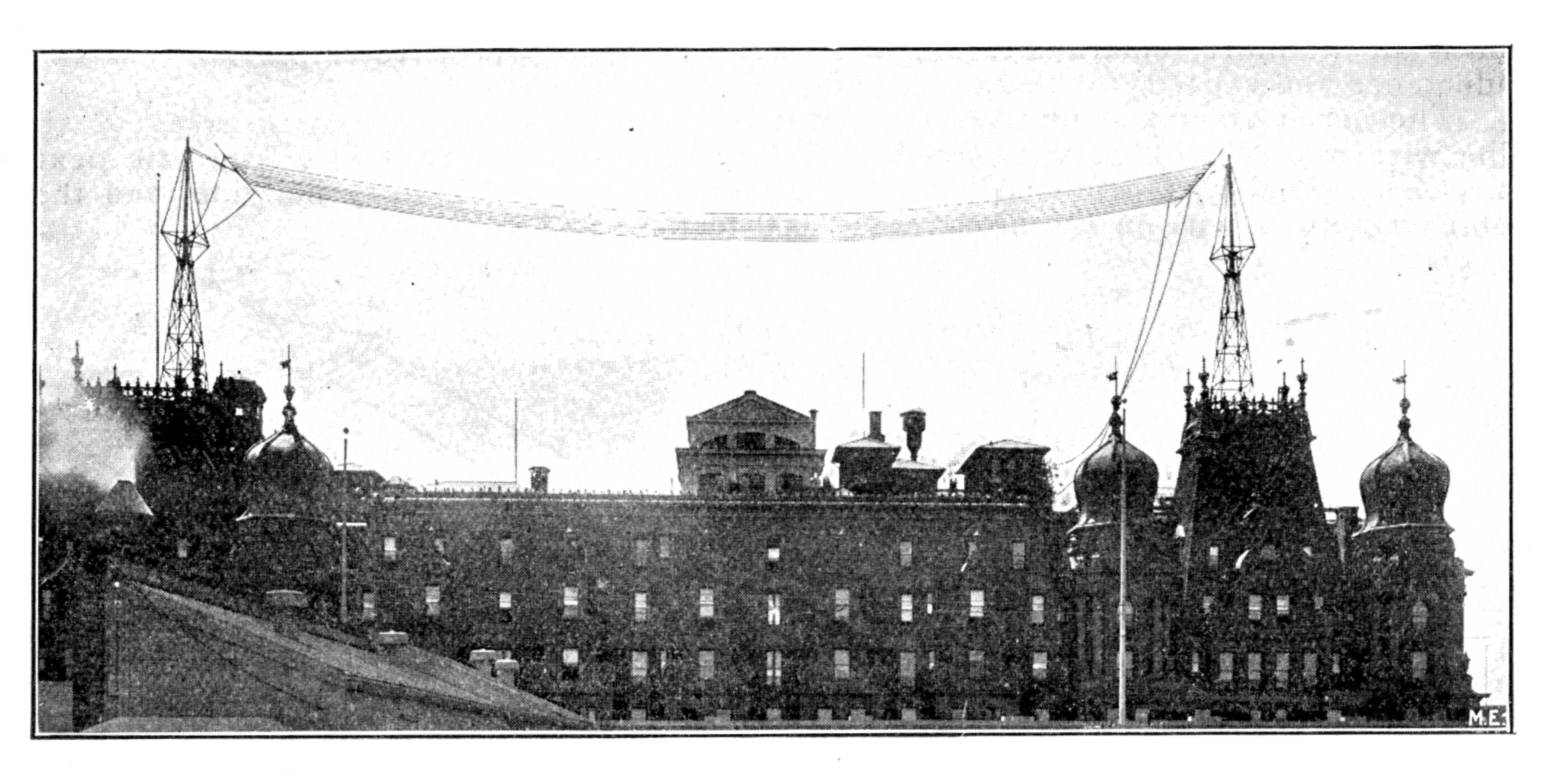
Station "WA", the United Wireless radiotelegraph station atop the Waldorf-Astoria building in New York City (1909)
