= Wireless Ship Act of 1910 =

American statute

- Other short titles: Radio Ship Act of 1910, Radio Act of 1910
- Long title: An Act to require apparatus and operators for radio-communication on certain ocean steamers
- Enacted by: the 61st United States Congress
- Effective: July 1, 1911

Citations
- Public law: Public Law 61-262
- Statutes at Large: 36 Stat. 629

Legislative history
- Introduced in the Senate as S. 7021 by William P. Frye; Committee consideration by Senate Committee on Commerce; Signed into law by President William Howard Taft on June 24, 1910

Major amendments
- Wireless Ship Act of 1912 (37 Stat. 199)

The Wireless Ship Act of 1910, formally titled "An Act to require apparatus and operators for radio-communication on certain ocean steamers" (36 Public Law 262) and also known as the "Radio Ship Act of 1910" and the "Radio Act of 1910", was the first federal legislation regulating radio communication in the United States. It required certain ocean-going vessels exiting U.S. ports to carry radio equipment, and although it did not require stations or operators to be licensed, it did require certification that operators and radio equipment met minimum standards.

The Act was approved on June 24, 1910, and became effective July 1, 1911. It was amended on July 23, 1912, to now cover all ships licensed for carrying 50 passengers and crew, including ones operating on the Great Lakes. This amendment also required the ships to have at least two operators who maintained a continuous watch.

== Background ==
In the years immediately after its development in the late 1890s, radio communication remained completely unregulated in the United States. On November 3, 1906, U.S. representatives meeting in Berlin signed the first International Radiotelegraph Convention, which called for national licensing of radio transmitters. This proposed treaty was brought before the U.S. Senate for ratification in early 1908, but in the face of strong opposition by the largest radio companies it was unable to gain approval.

Radio at this time was most commonly used for point-to-point communication, especially at sea. Despite the failure of the ratification effort for the 1906 Berlin Convention, it was recognized that there were strong public safety concerns that needed to be addressed, especially after the 1909 RMS Republic incident, where an onboard radio installation contributed to saving the lives of 1,200 people. Thus, a number of additional bills were brought before Congress.

== Adoption ==
The legislation that was ultimately passed was submitted by Senator William P. Frye of Maine, chairman of the Commerce Committee. It was approved on June 24, 1910 as Public Law No. 262, to become effective on July 1, 1911, and commonly known as the Wireless Ship Act of 1910. The new law required that all passenger-carrying ocean vessels of any nationality leaving a U.S. port had to be fitted with efficient radio apparatus when carrying 50 or more passengers and crew. This equipment had to be capable of transmitting messages to other systems over a distance of at least 100 miles (160 km), and under the supervision of a skilled operator. One exemption was that the law did not apply to "steamers plying only between ports less than 200 miles (320 km) apart". Under the law violators could be fined up to $5,000.

== Implementation ==
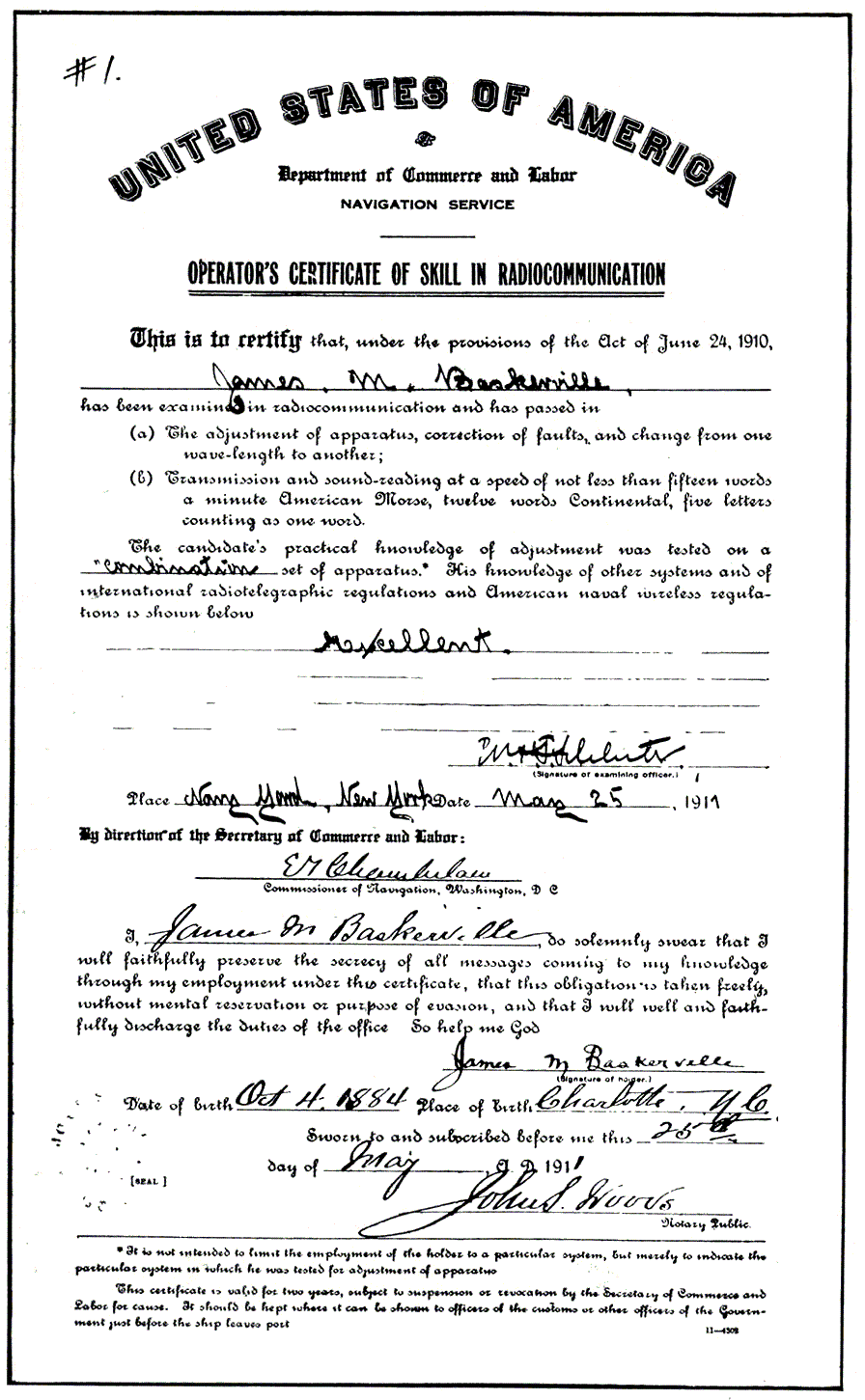
As part of the implementation of the Act, the U.S. government began certifying operators.

Congress assigned the job of administrating the Act to the Department of Commerce and Labor (Department of Commerce after March 1913), and approved an appropriation to finance its implementation. Some of the Act's provisions reflected similar portions of the 1906 Berlin Convention, including an "interconnectivity" provision that required the companies providing installations to allow contact with stations installed by other companies, which was intended to override a Marconi Company policy of only communicating with other Marconi installations, except in emergencies. Also included was the Berlin requirement that the shipboard radio equipment had to be "in charge of a person skilled in the use of such apparatus". The Commerce Department implemented examinations and began issuing two year "Certificates of Skill in Radiocommunication", with the tests taking place at navy yards. (Similar certificates granted by other countries were also recognized as valid). In July 1911 three radio inspectors began working from the ports of New York City, San Francisco, and Baltimore.

== 1912 Amendment ==
In response to the sinking of the RMS Titanic in April 1912, some of the provisions of the original act were strengthened by an amendment passed on July 23, 1912. Changes included adding vessels on the Great Lakes, requiring auxiliary electrical power supplies independent of a vessel's main power plant that were capable of enabling radio apparatus to be operated continuously for at least four hours at a minimum range of 100 miles (160 km), and a requirement that ships carry two or more operators and maintain a continuous watch.

== Impact and limitations ==
Although a substantial aid to "Safety at Sea" concerns, the Act, even after amendment, did little to improve numerous interference issues, and may have exacerbated the problem by increasing the number of transmitters without adopting any regulations to specify operating standards and control malicious behavior. A key issue was conflicts between amateur radio operators and the U.S. Navy and commercial companies. A few Amateur radio enthusiasts were alleged to have sent fake distress calls and obscene messages to naval radio stations, and to have forged naval commands, sending navy boats on spurious missions.

In addition, although most of the world's nations had ratified the 1906 Berlin Convention, the United States had not, and it was informed that because of this the U.S. would not be invited to the second International Radiotelegraph Convention scheduled to be held in London in June 1912. In response, on April 3, 1912, the U.S. Senate ratified the 1906 Convention. This followed by legislation implementing the convention's provisions by the passage of the Radio Act of 1912, which was signed by President Taft on August 13, 1912, and went into effect December 13, 1912. This new law greatly expanded government control over radio station licensing and operation.

== See also ==
- History of radio
